= List of 2019 UCI Women's Teams and riders =

List of cyclists

The following is a list of 2019 UCI Women's Teams and riders for the 2019 women's road cycling season.

== Riders ==
=== Alé–Cipollini ===
As of 2 February 2019.

Rider	Date of birth
Giorgia Bariani (ITA)	19 November 2000 (age 25)
Jelena Erić (SRB)	15 January 1996 (age 30)
Chloe Hosking (AUS)	1 October 1990 (age 35)
Romy Kasper (GER)	5 May 1988 (age 38)
Na Ah-reum (KOR)	24 March 1990 (age 36)
Soraya Paladin (ITA)	4 May 1993 (age 33)
Diana Peñuela (COL)	8 September 1986 (age 39)

Rider	Date of birth
Nadia Quagliotto (ITA)	22 March 1997 (age 29)
Jessica Raimondi (ITA)	21 February 1999 (age 27)
Karlijn Swinkels (NED)	28 October 1998 (age 27)
Anna Trevisi (ITA)	8 May 1992 (age 34)
Marjolein van't Geloof (NED)	27 March 1996 (age 30)
Eri Yonamine (JPN)	25 April 1991 (age 35)

=== Aromitalia–Basso Bikes–Vaiano ===
As of 2 February 2019.

Rider	Date of birth
Michela Balducci (ITA)	30 March 1995 (age 31)
Sofia Beggin (ITA)	12 October 1997 (age 28)
Letizia Borghesi (ITA)	16 October 1998 (age 27)
Angelica Brogi (ITA)	20 October 1998 (age 27)
Carmela Cipriani (ITA)	11 November 1996 (age 29)

Rider	Date of birth
Rasa Leleivytė (LTU)	22 July 1988 (age 37)
Giulia Marchesini (ITA)	14 May 1998 (age 28)
Emilia Matteoli (ITA)	12 November 1999 (age 26)
Nicole Nesti (ITA)	20 September 1997 (age 28)
Gemma Sernissi (ITA)	6 March 2000 (age 26)

=== Astana Women's Team ===
As of 3 February 2019.

Rider	Date of birth
Marie-Soleil Blais (CAN)	21 November 1988 (age 37)
Amiliya Iskakova (KAZ)	29 March 1995 (age 31)
Marina Kurnossova (KAZ)	24 August 2000 (age 25)
Liliana Moreno (COL)	8 July 1992 (age 33)
Svetlana Pachshenko (KAZ)	26 July 2000 (age 25)
Elena Pirrone (ITA)	21 February 1999 (age 27)
Faina Potapova (KAZ)	12 September 1996 (age 29)

Rider	Date of birth
Jeidi Pradera (CUB)	17 February 1998 (age 28)
Carolina Rodríguez (MEX)	30 September 1993 (age 32)
Natalya Saifutdinova (KAZ)	11 February 1989 (age 37)
Lizbeth Salazar (MEX)	8 December 1996 (age 29)
Olga Shekel (UKR)	28 May 1994 (age 31)
Arlenis Sierra (CUB)	7 December 1992 (age 33)
Makhabbat Umutzhanova (KAZ)	11 August 1994 (age 31)

=== Bepink ===
As of 3 February 2019.

Rider	Date of birth
Rachele Barbieri (ITA)	21 February 1997 (age 29)
Vania Canvelli (ITA)	21 October 1997 (age 28)
Tatiana Guderzo (ITA)	22 August 1984 (age 41)
Silvia Magri (ITA)	17 October 2000 (age 25)
Tereza Medveďová (SVK)	27 March 1996 (age 30)
Francesca Pattaro (ITA)	12 March 1995 (age 31)

Rider	Date of birth
Chiara Perini (ITA)	9 December 1997 (age 28)
Katia Ragusa (ITA)	19 May 1997 (age 28)
Gloria Scarsi (ITA)	30 September 2000 (age 25)
Nicole Steigenga (NED)	27 January 1998 (age 28)
Silvia Valsecchi (ITA)	19 July 1982 (age 43)
Silvia Zanardi (ITA)	3 March 2000 (age 26)

=== Biehler Pro Cycling ===
As of 3 February 2019.

Rider	Date of birth
Marissa Baks (NED)	5 December 1998 (age 27)
Teuntje Beekhuis (NED)	18 August 1995 (age 30)
Henrietta Colborne (GBR)	19 September 1989 (age 36)
Merel Hofman (NED)	4 January 1998 (age 28)
Roos Hoogeboom (NED)	16 August 1982 (age 43)

Rider	Date of birth
Melanie Klement (NED)	3 May 1994 (age 32)
Quinty Ton (NED)	4 August 1998 (age 27)
Natalie van Gogh (NED)	14 September 1974 (age 51)
Nienke Wasmus (NED)	23 October 1999 (age 26)

=== Bigla Pro Cycling ===
As of 3 February 2019.

Rider	Date of birth
Martina Alzini (ITA)	10 February 1997 (age 29)
Lizzy Banks (GBR)	7 November 1990 (age 35)
Elise Chabbey (SUI)	24 April 1993 (age 33)
Nicole Hanselmann (SUI)	6 May 1991 (age 35)
Mikayla Harvey (NZL)	7 September 1998 (age 27)
Julie Leth (DNK)	13 July 1992 (age 33)

Rider	Date of birth
Emma Cecilie Norsgaard (DNK)	26 July 1999 (age 26)
Nikola Nosková (CZE)	1 July 1997 (age 28)
Maria Vittoria Sperotto (ITA)	20 November 1996 (age 29)
Leah Thomas (USA)	30 May 1989 (age 36)
Cecilie Uttrup Ludwig (DNK)	23 August 1995 (age 30)
Sophie Wright (GBR)	15 March 1999 (age 27)

=== Bizkaia–Durango ===
As of 5 February 2019.

Rider	Date of birth
Sandra Alonso (ESP)	19 August 1998 (age 27)
Nicole D'Agostin (ITA)	1 February 1999 (age 27)
Ainara Elbusto (ESP)	10 September 1992 (age 33)
Ariana Gilabert (ESP)	12 April 2000 (age 26)
Lucía González Blanco (ESP)	9 July 1990 (age 35)
Aroa Gorostiza (ESP)	7 May 1999 (age 27)
Natalie Grinczer (GBR)	15 November 1993 (age 32)

Rider	Date of birth
Luisa Ibarrola (ESP)	13 March 2000 (age 26)
Irene Loizate (ESP)	17 May 1995 (age 30)
Enara López (ESP)	3 July 1997 (age 28)
Isabel Martín (ESP)	1 May 1999 (age 27)
Cristina Martínez (ESP)	2 January 1996 (age 30)
Doris Schweizer (SUI)	28 August 1989 (age 36)
Miho Yoshikawa (JPN)	15 January 1993 (age 33)

=== Boels–Dolmans ===
As of 5 February 2019.

Rider	Date of birth
Chantal Blaak (NED)	22 October 1989 (age 36)
Eva Buurman (NED)	7 September 1994 (age 31)
Karol-Ann Canuel (CAN)	18 April 1988 (age 38)
Jolien D'Hoore (BEL)	14 March 1990 (age 36)
Amalie Dideriksen (DNK)	24 May 1996 (age 29)
Katie Hall (USA)	6 January 1987 (age 39)

Rider	Date of birth
Annika Langvad (DNK)	22 March 1984 (age 42)
Christine Majerus (LUX)	25 February 1987 (age 39)
Amy Pieters (NED)	1 June 1991 (age 34)
Skylar Schneider (USA)	3 September 1998 (age 27)
Jip van den Bos (NED)	12 April 1996 (age 30)
Anna van der Breggen (NED)	18 April 1990 (age 36)

=== BTC City Ljubljana ===
As of 7 February 2019.

Rider	Date of birth
Maaike Boogaard (NED)	24 August 1998 (age 27)
Urška Bravec (SLO)	14 December 1996 (age 29)
Eugenia Bujak (POL)	25 June 1989 (age 36)
Anastasiia Chursina (RUS)	7 April 1995 (age 31)
Anja Longyka (SLO)	21 June 1993 (age 32)
Hanna Nilsson (SWE)	16 February 1992 (age 34)
Urša Pintar (SLO)	3 October 1985 (age 40)

Rider	Date of birth
Mia Radotić (CRO)	2 December 1984 (age 41)
Rossella Ratto (ITA)	20 October 1993 (age 32)
Maja Savić (SRB)	27 July 1994 (age 31)
Hayley Simmonds (GBR)	22 July 1988 (age 37)
Monique van de Ree (NED)	2 March 1988 (age 38)
Urška Žigart (SLO)	4 December 1996 (age 29)

=== Canyon–SRAM ===
As of 8 February 2019.

Rider	Date of birth
Alena Amialiusik (BLR)	6 February 1989 (age 37)
Alice Barnes (GBR)	17 July 1995 (age 30)
Hannah Barnes (GBR)	4 May 1993 (age 33)
Elena Cecchini (ITA)	25 May 1992 (age 33)
Tiffany Cromwell (AUS)	6 July 1988 (age 37)
Tanja Erath (GER)	7 October 1989 (age 36)
Pauline Ferrand-Prévot (FRA)	10 February 1992 (age 34)
Rotem Gafinovitz (ISR)	9 June 1992 (age 33)

Rider	Date of birth
Ella Harris (NZL)	18 July 1998 (age 27)
Lisa Klein (GER)	15 July 1996 (age 29)
Hannah Ludwig (GER)	15 February 2000 (age 26)
Katarzyna Niewiadoma (POL)	29 September 1994 (age 31)
Christa Riffel (GER)	30 July 1998 (age 27)
Alexis Ryan (USA)	18 August 1994 (age 31)
Omer Shapira (ISR)	9 September 1994 (age 31)

=== CCC Liv ===
As of 9 February 2019.

Rider	Date of birth
Valerie Demey (BEL)	17 January 1994 (age 32)
Jeanne Korevaar (NED)	24 September 1996 (age 29)
Evy Kuijpers (NED)	15 February 1995 (age 31)
Marta Lach (POL)	26 May 1997 (age 28)
Riejanne Markus (NED)	1 September 1994 (age 31)
Ashleigh Moolman (RSA)	9 December 1985 (age 40)

Rider	Date of birth
Pauliena Rooijakkers (NED)	12 May 1993 (age 33)
Agnieszka Skalniak (POL)	22 April 1997 (age 29)
Sabrina Stultiens (NED)	8 July 1993 (age 32)
Inge van der Heijden (NED)	12 August 1999 (age 26)
Marianne Vos (NED)	13 May 1987 (age 39)

=== Charente–Maritime Women Cycling ===
As of 10 February 2019.

Rider	Date of birth
Noémie Abgrall (FRA)	1 December 1999 (age 26)
Pauline Allin (FRA)	2 May 1995 (age 31)
India Grangier (FRA)	5 January 2000 (age 26)
Lucie Lahaye (FRA)	21 November 1997 (age 28)
Manon Minaud (FRA)	21 October 1998 (age 27)

Rider	Date of birth
Anaïs Morichon (FRA)	6 October 1999 (age 26)
Marine Quiniou (FRA)	26 August 1993 (age 32)
Iris Sachet (FRA)	29 May 1994 (age 31)
Gladys Verhulst (FRA)	2 January 1997 (age 29)

=== China Liv Pro Cycling ===
As of 10 February 2019.

Rider	Date of birth
Bai Yue (CHN)	13 December 1992 (age 33)
Chen Qiaolin (CHN)	2 September 1996 (age 29)
Li Jiaqi (CHN)	27 July 1995 (age 30)
Liang Hongyu (CHN)	23 October 1990 (age 35)
Liu Dexiang (CHN)	20 January 1993 (age 33)
Liu Jiali (CHN)	6 April 1994 (age 32)

Rider	Date of birth
Lu Mei (CHN)	16 April 1997 (age 29)
Lu Siying (CHN)	4 November 1996 (age 29)
Meng Zhaojuan (HKG)	14 December 1989 (age 36)
Peixiao Wu (CHN)	27 August 1996 (age 29)
Pu Yixian (CHN)	23 December 1992 (age 33)
Zhao Xisha (CHN)	28 September 1992 (age 33)

=== Cogeas–Mettler–Look ===
As of 10 February 2019.

Rider	Date of birth
Evgeniya Augustinas (RUS)	22 January 1988 (age 38)
Gulnaz Badykova (RUS)	21 April 1994 (age 32)
Renata Baymetova (UZB)	9 August 1998 (age 27)
Antri Christoforou (CYP)	2 April 1992 (age 34)
Olga Deyko (RUS)	23 December 1995 (age 30)
Karina Kasenova (RUS)	5 June 1998 (age 27)
Alina Khakimova (UZB)	25 September 1997 (age 28)
Ekaterina Knebeleva (UZB)	13 December 1996 (age 29)

Rider	Date of birth
Amber Neben (USA)	18 February 1975 (age 51)
Maria Novolodskaya (RUS)	28 July 1999 (age 26)
Yelyzaveta Oshurkova (RUS)	19 June 1991 (age 34)
Edwige Pitel (FRA)	4 June 1967 (age 58)
Anastasiia Pliaskina (RUS)	21 February 1996 (age 30)
Sari Saarelainen (FIN)	1 March 1981 (age 45)
Olga Zabelinskaya (UZB)	10 May 1980 (age 46)

=== Conceria Zabri–Fanini ===
As of 10 February 2019.

Rider	Date of birth
Lisa Allkokondi (ALB)	17 May 1995 (age 30)
Francesca Balducci (ITA)	1 May 1996 (age 30)
Simona Bortolotti (ITA)	6 December 1994 (age 31)
Sofia Cilenti (ITA)	20 January 1995 (age 31)
Lisa De Ranieri (ITA)	30 July 1997 (age 28)
Keti Fetishi (ALB)	15 April 1997 (age 29)
Leonora Geppi (ITA)	9 December 1999 (age 26)
Joli Karafili (ALB)	6 October 1995 (age 30)

Rider	Date of birth
Xhorxhia Kristollari (ALB)	2 May 1995 (age 31)
Xhejna Metalja (ALB)	6 February 1997 (age 29)
Claudia Meucci (ITA)	22 January 1999 (age 27)
Loreta Pirro (ALB)	15 November 1997 (age 28)
Jona Rizvanolli (ALB)	2 May 1992 (age 34)
Elona Rusta (ALB)	3 September 1996 (age 29)
Basei Marzia Salton (ITA)	7 July 1997 (age 28)

=== Doltcini–Van Eyck Sport UCI Women Cycling ===
As of 10 February 2019.

Rider	Date of birth
Victoire Berteau (FRA)	16 August 2000 (age 25)
Kim de Baat (BEL)	29 May 1991 (age 34)
Mieke Docx (BEL)	8 June 1996 (age 29)
Demmy Druyts (BEL)	4 October 1995 (age 30)
Kelly Druyts (BEL)	21 October 1989 (age 36)
Lenny Druyts (BEL)	18 May 1997 (age 28)
Séverine Eraud (FRA)	24 February 1995 (age 31)
Pascale Jeuland (FRA)	2 June 1987 (age 38)

Rider	Date of birth
Kelly Markus (NED)	7 February 1993 (age 33)
Daniela Reis (POR)	6 April 1993 (age 33)
Tetyana Ryabchenko (UKR)	28 August 1989 (age 36)
Marion Sicot (FRA)	24 June 1992 (age 33)
Bryony van Velzen (NED)	14 May 1996 (age 30)
Saartje Vandenbroucke (BEL)	13 February 1996 (age 30)
Jesse Vandenbulcke (BEL)	17 January 1996 (age 30)
Anisha Vekemans (BEL)	17 August 1991 (age 34)

=== Drops Cycling Team ===
As of 12 February 2019.

Rider	Date of birth
Grace Anderson (NZL)	9 July 1997 (age 28)
Elinor Barker (GBR)	7 September 1994 (age 31)
Megan Barker (GBR)	15 August 1997 (age 28)
Anna Christian (GBR)	6 August 1995 (age 30)
Ellie Dickinson (GBR)	4 June 1998 (age 27)

Rider	Date of birth
Lizzie Holden (GBR)	12 September 1997 (age 28)
Manon Lloyd (GBR)	5 November 1996 (age 29)
Abby-Mae Parkinson (GBR)	30 July 1997 (age 28)
Hannah Payton (GBR)	23 March 1994 (age 32)
Lucy Shaw (GBR)	17 July 1997 (age 28)

=== Eneicat Cycling Team ===
As of 13 February 2019.

Rider	Date of birth
Alessia Bulleri (ITA)	19 July 1993 (age 32)
Varvara Fasoi (GRE)	2 February 1991 (age 35)
Andrea Fraile (ESP)	2 January 1993 (age 33)
Saioa Gil (ESP)	18 February 2000 (age 26)
Mayuko Hagiwara (JPN)	16 October 1986 (age 39)
Ziortza Isasi (ESP)	5 August 1995 (age 30)

Rider	Date of birth
Lija Laizāne (LAT)	6 July 1993 (age 32)
Fie Østerby (DNK)	10 May 1992 (age 34)
Cristina Pujol (ESP)	29 October 1990 (age 35)
Paula Sanmartín (ESP)	16 May 1997 (age 29)
Sandra Santos (POR)	2 June 1992 (age 33)

=== Eurotarget–Bianchi–Vittoria ===
As of 14 February 2019.

Rider	Date of birth
Ana Maria Covrig (ROM)	8 December 1994 (age 31)
Clemilda Fernandes (BRA)	25 June 1979 (age 46)
Arianna Fidanza (ITA)	6 January 1995 (age 31)
Martina Fidanza (ITA)	5 November 1999 (age 26)
Elena Franchi (ITA)	26 August 1996 (age 29)
Alice Gasparini (ITA)	14 December 1997 (age 28)

Rider	Date of birth
Gloria Manzoni (ITA)	25 April 1998 (age 28)
Lisa Morzenti (ITA)	23 January 1998 (age 28)
Gloria Nardi (ITA)	14 July 2000 (age 25)
Beatrice Rossato (ITA)	6 November 1996 (age 29)
Debora Silvestri (ITA)	8 May 1998 (age 28)

=== FDJ Nouvelle-Aquitaine Futuroscope ===
As of 14 February 2019.

Rider	Date of birth
Charlotte Becker (GER)	19 May 1983 (age 42)
Charlotte Bravard (FRA)	12 January 1992 (age 34)
Coralie Demay (FRA)	10 October 1992 (age 33)
Eugénie Duval (FRA)	3 May 1993 (age 33)
Emilia Fahlin (SWE)	24 October 1988 (age 37)
Shara Gillow (AUS)	23 December 1987 (age 38)
Maëlle Grossetête (FRA)	10 April 1998 (age 28)

Rider	Date of birth
Victorie Guilman (FRA)	25 March 1996 (age 30)
Lauren Kitchen (AUS)	21 November 1990 (age 35)
Marie Le Net (FRA)	25 January 2000 (age 26)
Évita Muzic (FRA)	26 May 1999 (age 26)
Greta Richioud (FRA)	11 October 1996 (age 29)
Jade Wiel (FRA)	2 April 2000 (age 26)

=== Hagens Berman–Supermint ===
As of 16 February 2019.

Rider	Date of birth
Whitney Allison (USA)	1 March 1988 (age 38)
Jessica Cerra (USA)	1 May 1982 (age 44)
Leigh Ann Ganzar (USA)	8 September 1989 (age 36)
Lindsay Goldman (USA)	31 October 1984 (age 41)
Julie Kuliecza (USA)	4 November 1980 (age 45)

Rider	Date of birth
Harriet Owen (GBR)	16 December 1993 (age 32)
Liza Rachetto (USA)	30 January 1974 (age 52)
Starla Teddergreen (USA)	11 December 1979 (age 46)
Aimee Vasse (USA)	22 July 1978 (age 47)
Lily Williams (USA)	24 June 1994 (age 31)

=== Health Mate–Cyclelive Team ===
As of 16 February 2019.

Rider	Date of birth
Lara Defour (BEL)	12 November 1997 (age 28)
Fien Delbaere (BEL)	21 April 1996 (age 30)
Veronika Kormos (HUN)	17 August 1992 (age 33)
Marga López (ESP)	3 December 1997 (age 28)
Laura Camila Lozano Ramírez (COL)	25 October 1986 (age 39)
Esther Meisles (ISR)	10 June 1995 (age 30)
Sara Mustonen (SWE)	8 February 1981 (age 45)
Christina Perchtold (AUT)	11 May 1993 (age 33)
Lotte Rotman (BEL)	19 June 1999 (age 26)

Rider	Date of birth
Christina Schweinberger (AUT)	29 October 1996 (age 29)
Kathrin Schweinberger (AUT)	29 October 1996 (age 29)
Laura Süßemilch (GER)	23 February 1997 (age 29)
Zsófia Szabó (HUN)	3 January 1997 (age 29)
Chloë Turblin (FRA)	19 September 1995 (age 30)
Kirstie van Haaften (NED)	21 January 1999 (age 27)
Suzanne Verhoeven (BEL)	8 May 1996 (age 30)
Kylie Waterreus (NED)	22 March 1998 (age 28)

=== Hitec Products–Birk Sport ===
As of 17 February 2019.

Rider	Date of birth
Pernille Feldmann (NOR)	1 February 2000 (age 26)
Grace Garner (GBR)	19 June 1997 (age 28)
Lucy Garner (GBR)	20 September 1994 (age 31)
Ingvild Gåskjenn (NOR)	1 July 1998 (age 27)
Vita Heine (NOR)	21 November 1984 (age 41)
Ingrid Lorvik (NOR)	21 February 1986 (age 40)

Rider	Date of birth
Amalie Lutro (NOR)	15 March 2000 (age 26)
Julie Meyer Solvang (NOR)	3 September 1989 (age 36)
Chanella Stougje (NED)	23 October 1996 (age 29)
Marta Tagliaferro (ITA)	4 November 1989 (age 36)
Lonneke Uneken (NED)	2 March 2000 (age 26)

=== Lotto–Soudal Ladies ===
As of 21 February 2019.

Rider	Date of birth
Danique Braam (NED)	5 September 1995 (age 30)
Alana Castrique (BEL)	8 May 1999 (age 27)
Dani Christmas (GBR)	21 December 1987 (age 38)
Demi de Jong (NED)	11 February 1995 (age 31)
Marie Dessart (BEL)	13 December 1980 (age 45)
Annelies Dom (BEL)	8 April 1986 (age 40)
Chantal Hoffmann (LUX)	30 October 1987 (age 38)

Rider	Date of birth
Lotte Kopecky (BEL)	10 November 1995 (age 30)
Puck Moonen (NED)	20 March 1996 (age 30)
Nguyễn Thị Thật (VIE)	6 March 1993 (age 33)
Julie Van de Velde (BEL)	2 June 1993 (age 32)
Kelly Van den Steen (BEL)	1 September 1995 (age 30)
Fenna Vanhoutte (BEL)	6 July 1997 (age 28)

=== Massi–Tactic Women Team ===
As of 23 February 2019.

Rider	Date of birth
Cristina Aznar (ESP)	3 August 1990 (age 35)
Sofía Barriguete (ESP)	5 July 2000 (age 25)
Mireia Benito (ESP)	30 December 1996 (age 29)
Elisabet Escursell Valero (ESP)	30 October 1996 (age 29)
Noemi Ferré (ESP)	24 November 1991 (age 34)
Nekane Gómez (ESP)	2 September 1999 (age 26)

Rider	Date of birth
Marina Isan Berga (ESP)	12 April 1994 (age 32)
Elisabet Llabrés (ESP)	11 September 1997 (age 28)
Belén López (ESP)	18 April 1984 (age 42)
Sandra Moral (ESP)	28 November 1991 (age 34)
Teresa Ripoll Sabate (ESP)	3 February 1997 (age 29)

=== Minsk Cycling Club ===
As of 23 February 2019.

Rider	Date of birth
Anastasiya Dzedzikava (BLR)	2 January 1997 (age 29)
Nastassia Kiptsikava (BLR)	10 August 1999 (age 26)
Taisa Naskovich (BLR)	19 September 1995 (age 30)
Palina Pivavarava (BLR)	12 October 1994 (age 31)

Rider	Date of birth
Ina Savenka (BLR)	5 August 1994 (age 31)
Karalina Savenka (BLR)	21 April 1998 (age 28)
Tatsiana Sharakova (BLR)	31 July 1984 (age 41)
Hanna Tserakh (BLR)	7 September 1998 (age 27)

=== Mitchelton–Scott ===
As of 24 February 2019.

Rider	Date of birth
Jessica Allen (AUS)	17 April 1993 (age 33)
Grace Brown (AUS)	7 July 1992 (age 33)
Gracie Elvin (AUS)	31 October 1988 (age 37)
Lucy Kennedy (AUS)	11 July 1988 (age 37)
Alexandra Manly (AUS)	28 February 1996 (age 30)

Rider	Date of birth
Sarah Roy (AUS)	27 February 1986 (age 40)
Amanda Spratt (AUS)	17 September 1987 (age 38)
Moniek Tenniglo (NED)	2 May 1988 (age 38)
Annemiek van Vleuten (NED)	8 October 1982 (age 43)
Georgia Williams (NZL)	25 August 1993 (age 32)

=== Movistar Team ===
As of 24 February 2019.

Rider	Date of birth
Aude Biannic (FRA)	27 March 1991 (age 35)
Roxane Fournier (FRA)	7 November 1991 (age 34)
Margarita Victoria García (ESP)	2 January 1984 (age 42)
Alicia González Blanco (ESP)	27 May 1995 (age 30)
Sheyla Gutiérrez (ESP)	1 January 1994 (age 32)
Małgorzata Jasińska (POL)	18 January 1984 (age 42)

Rider	Date of birth
Lorena Llamas (ESP)	25 October 1987 (age 38)
Eider Merino Cortazar (ESP)	2 August 1994 (age 31)
Lourdes Oyarbide (ESP)	8 April 1994 (age 32)
Paula Patiño (COL)	29 March 1997 (age 29)
Gloria Rodríguez (ESP)	6 March 1992 (age 34)
Alba Teruel Ribes (ESP)	17 August 1996 (age 29)

=== Parkhotel Valkenburg Cycling Team ===
As of 24 February 2019.

Rider	Date of birth
Loes Adegeest (NED)	7 August 1996 (age 29)
Nina Buysman (NED)	16 November 1997 (age 28)
Sophie de Boer (NED)	12 December 1990 (age 35)
Belle de Gast (NED)	4 February 1991 (age 35)
Anne de Ruiter (NED)	30 November 1999 (age 26)
Sofie De Vuyst (BEL)	2 April 1987 (age 39)
Ann-Sophie Duyck (BEL)	23 July 1987 (age 38)
Roxane Knetemann (NED)	1 April 1987 (age 39)
Femke Markus (NED)	17 November 1996 (age 29)

Rider	Date of birth
Fleur Nagengast (NED)	28 January 1998 (age 28)
Marit Raaijmakers (NED)	2 June 1999 (age 26)
Sylvie Swinkels (NED)	31 July 2000 (age 25)
Meike Uiterwijk Winkel (NED)	4 December 1999 (age 26)
Janine van der Meer (NED)	17 February 1994 (age 32)
Esther van Veen (NED)	27 September 1990 (age 35)
Demi Vollering (NED)	15 November 1996 (age 29)
Lorena Wiebes (NED)	17 March 1999 (age 27)

=== Rally UHC Cycling ===
As of 24 February 2019.

Rider	Date of birth
Erica Allar (USA)	5 November 1985 (age 40)
Sara Bergen (CAN)	6 December 1988 (age 37)
Allison Beveridge (CAN)	1 June 1993 (age 32)
Kelly Catlin (USA)	3 November 1995 (age 30)
Kristabel Doebel-Hickok (USA)	28 April 1989 (age 37)
Gillian Ellsay (CAN)	26 March 1997 (age 29)
Heidi Franz (USA)	14 January 1995 (age 31)

Rider	Date of birth
Megan Jastrab (USA)	29 January 2002 (age 24)
Kirsti Lay (CAN)	7 April 1988 (age 38)
Katherine Maine (CAN)	22 November 1997 (age 28)
Abigail Mickey (USA)	3 July 1990 (age 35)
Summer Moak (USA)	3 June 1999 (age 26)
Sara Poidevin (CAN)	7 May 1996 (age 30)
Emma White (USA)	23 August 1997 (age 28)

=== Servetto–Piumate–Beltrami TSA ===
As of 26 February 2019.

Rider	Date of birth
Sara Casasola (ITA)	29 November 1999 (age 26)
Morgane Coston (FRA)	28 December 1990 (age 35)
Mossana Debesai (ERI)	25 November 1993 (age 32)
Kseniya Dobrynina (RUS)	11 January 1994 (age 32)
Aurora Gaio (ITA)	18 February 1999 (age 27)
Aleksandra Goncharova (RUS)	26 October 1992 (age 33)
Markéta Hájková (CZE)	14 March 2000 (age 26)

Rider	Date of birth
Mónika Király (HUN)	10 November 1983 (age 42)
Elena Novikova (UKR)	14 January 1984 (age 42)
Irena Ossola (USA)	19 April 1988 (age 38)
Valentina Picca (ITA)	24 June 1988 (age 37)
Anna Potokina (RUS)	18 June 1987 (age 38)
Yevheniya Vysotska (UKR)	11 December 1975 (age 50)

=== Sho-Air TWENTY20 ===
As of 9 March 2019.

Rider	Date of birth
Sofía Arreola (MEX)	22 April 1991 (age 35)
Simone Boilard (CAN)	21 July 2000 (age 25)
Erica Clevenger (USA)	1 May 1994 (age 32)
Margot Clyne (USA)	27 February 1995 (age 31)
Jasmin Duehring (CAN)	8 July 1992 (age 33)
Chloé Dygert Owen (USA)	1 January 1997 (age 29)

Rider	Date of birth
Allie Legg (USA)	17 December 1989 (age 36)
Jennifer Luebke (USA)	1 April 1986 (age 40)
Shayna Powless (USA)	8 January 1994 (age 32)
Stephanie Roorda (CAN)	3 December 1986 (age 39)
Jennifer Valente (USA)	24 December 1994 (age 31)
Melanie Wong (USA)	30 October 1986 (age 39)

=== Sopela Women's Team ===
As of 27 February 2019.

Rider	Date of birth
Andere Basterra (ESP)	5 October 2000 (age 25)
Yurani Blanco (ESP)	3 February 1998 (age 28)
Julia Casas (ESP)	1 October 1980 (age 45)
Isabel Ferreres (ESP)	8 October 1998 (age 27)
Amaia Malatsetxebarria (ESP)	9 December 2000 (age 25)
Sara Martín (ESP)	22 March 1999 (age 27)
Maria Martins (POR)	9 July 1999 (age 26)

Rider	Date of birth
Alexandra Moreno (ESP)	25 January 2000 (age 26)
Mireia Muñoz (ESP)	24 December 1998 (age 27)
Ariadna Nevado (ESP)	26 September 2000 (age 25)
Elné Owen (RSA)	25 July 1999 (age 26)
Sofia Rodríguez (ESP)	21 October 1999 (age 26)
Ariadna Trias (ESP)	27 April 1995 (age 31)
Mireia Trias (ESP)	22 March 2000 (age 26)

=== Swapit–Agolico ===
As of 27 February 2019.

Rider	Date of birth
Anet Barrera (MEX)	9 September 1998 (age 27)
Ariadna Gutiérrez (MEX)	22 August 1991 (age 34)
Paola Muñoz (CHI)	13 April 1986 (age 40)
Flávia Oliveira (BRA)	27 October 1981 (age 44)
Marcela Prieto (MEX)	11 March 1992 (age 34)
Andrea Ramírez (MEX)	25 September 1999 (age 26)

Rider	Date of birth
Milena Salcedo (COL)	14 May 1988 (age 38)
Ana Sanabria (COL)	2 May 1990 (age 36)
Brenda Santoyo (MEX)	17 August 1996 (age 29)
Jasmin Soto (GUA)	11 January 1993 (age 33)
María José Vargas (CRC)	15 February 1996 (age 30)

=== Team Illuminate ===
As of 28 February 2019.

Rider	Date of birth
Rebecca Beaumont (CAN)	12 September 1990 (age 35)
Kulacha Chairin (THA)	16 November 1988 (age 37)
Tatiana Dueñas (COL)	31 March 1998 (age 28)
Amity Gregg (USA)	28 May 1993 (age 32)
Daphne Karagianis (USA)	31 August 1985 (age 40)

Rider	Date of birth
Shoko Kashiki (JPN)	9 November 1993 (age 32)
Jessenia Meneses (COL)	18 June 1995 (age 30)
Lexie Millard (USA)	20 May 1993 (age 32)
Stephanie Subercaseaux (CHI)	23 March 1984 (age 42)

=== Team Sunweb ===
As of 28 February 2019.

Rider	Date of birth
Susanne Andersen (NOR)	23 July 1998 (age 27)
Lucinda Brand (NED)	2 July 1989 (age 36)
Janneke Ensing (NED)	21 September 1986 (age 39)
Pfeiffer Georgi (GBR)	27 September 2000 (age 25)
Leah Kirchmann (CAN)	30 June 1990 (age 35)
Juliette Labous (FRA)	4 November 1998 (age 27)

Rider	Date of birth
Liane Lippert (GER)	13 January 1998 (age 28)
Floortje Mackaij (NED)	18 October 1995 (age 30)
Pernille Mathiesen (DEN)	5 October 1997 (age 28)
Coryn Rivera (USA)	26 August 1992 (age 33)
Julia Soek (NED)	12 December 1990 (age 35)

=== Tibco–Silicon Valley Bank ===
As of 1 March 2019.

Rider	Date of birth
Lex Albrecht (CAN)	6 April 1987 (age 39)
Nicolle Bruderer (GUA)	15 August 1993 (age 32)
Brodie Chapman (AUS)	9 April 1991 (age 35)
Alice Cobb (GBR)	31 July 1995 (age 30)
Íngrid Drexel (MEX)	28 July 1993 (age 32)
Megan Guarnier (USA)	4 May 1985 (age 41)
Alison Jackson (CAN)	14 December 1988 (age 37)

Rider	Date of birth
Nina Kessler (NED)	4 July 1988 (age 37)
Sharlotte Lucas (NZL)	25 July 1991 (age 34)
Shannon Malseed (AUS)	27 December 1994 (age 31)
Emily Newsom (USA)	4 September 1983 (age 42)
Kendall Ryan (USA)	10 August 1992 (age 33)
Rozanne Slik (NED)	12 April 1991 (age 35)
Lauren Stephens (USA)	28 December 1986 (age 39)

=== Team Virtu Cycling Women ===
As of 3 March 2019.

Rider	Date of birth
Katrine Aalerud (NOR)	4 December 1994 (age 31)
Marta Bastianelli (ITA)	30 April 1987 (age 39)
Sofia Bertizzolo (ITA)	21 August 1997 (age 28)
Barbara Guarischi (ITA)	2 October 1990 (age 35)
Anouska Koster (NED)	20 August 1993 (age 32)
Mieke Kröger (GER)	18 July 1993 (age 32)
Birgitte Krogsgaard (DNK)	27 October 1991 (age 34)

Rider	Date of birth
Emilie Moberg (NOR)	12 July 1991 (age 34)
Rachel Neylan (AUS)	9 March 1982 (age 44)
Louise Norman Hansen (DNK)	12 February 1995 (age 31)
Katarzyna Pawłowska (POL)	16 August 1989 (age 36)
Sara Penton (SWE)	15 November 1988 (age 37)
Trine Schmidt (DNK)	3 June 1988 (age 37)
Christina Siggaard (DNK)	24 March 1994 (age 32)

=== Thailand Women's Cycling Team ===
As of 5 March 2019.

Rider	Date of birth
Chaniporn Batriya (THA)	12 August 1999 (age 26)
Kanyarat Gatethonglang (THA)	6 October 1999 (age 26)
Sarocha Kamonkhon (THA)	15 August 1997 (age 28)
Wilaiwan Kunlapha (THA)	25 December 1987 (age 38)

Rider	Date of birth
Jutatip Maneephan (THA)	8 July 1988 (age 37)
Chanpeng Nontasin (THA)	9 October 1984 (age 41)
Supaksorn Nuntana (THA)	8 December 1989 (age 36)
Phetdarin Somrat (THA)	6 June 1995 (age 30)

=== Top Girls Fassa Bortolo ===
As of 5 March 2019.

Rider	Date of birth
Elisa Dalla Valle (ITA)	16 January 1998 (age 28)
Elena Leonardi (ITA)	7 December 1995 (age 30)
Greta Marturano (ITA)	14 June 1998 (age 27)
Iris Monticolo (ITA)	15 July 2000 (age 25)

Rider	Date of birth
Maja Perinović (CRO)	24 September 1999 (age 26)
Martina Stefani (ITA)	6 November 1998 (age 27)
Martina Toffanin (ITA)	23 June 2000 (age 25)
Laura Tomasi (ITA)	1 July 1999 (age 26)

=== Trek–Segafredo ===
As of 6 March 2019.

Rider	Date of birth
Audrey Cordon-Ragot (FRA)	22 September 1989 (age 36)
Lizzie Deignan (GBR)	18 December 1988 (age 37)
Lauretta Hanson (AUS)	29 October 1994 (age 31)
Lotta Lepistö (FIN)	28 June 1989 (age 36)
Elisa Longo Borghini (ITA)	10 December 1991 (age 34)
Jolanda Neff (SUI)	5 January 1993 (age 33)
Ellen Noble (USA)	3 December 1995 (age 30)

Rider	Date of birth
Letizia Paternoster (ITA)	22 July 1999 (age 26)
Anna Plichta (POL)	10 February 1992 (age 34)
Ellen van Dijk (NED)	11 February 1987 (age 39)
Abi Van Twisk (GBR)	1 March 1997 (age 29)
Tayler Wiles (USA)	20 July 1989 (age 36)
Ruth Winder (USA)	9 July 1993 (age 32)
Trixi Worrack (GER)	28 September 1981 (age 44)

=== Valcar–Cylance ===
As of 10 March 2019.

Rider	Date of birth
Alice Maria Arzuffi (ITA)	19 November 1994 (age 31)
Elisa Balsamo (ITA)	27 February 1998 (age 28)
Marta Cavalli (ITA)	18 March 1998 (age 28)
Maria Giulia Confalonieri (ITA)	30 March 1993 (age 33)
Chiara Consonni (ITA)	24 June 1999 (age 26)
Vittoria Guazzini (ITA)	26 December 2000 (age 25)
Barbara Malcotti (ITA)	19 February 2000 (age 26)

Rider	Date of birth
Dalia Muccioli (ITA)	22 May 1993 (age 32)
Asja Paladin (ITA)	27 September 1994 (age 31)
Silvia Persico (ITA)	25 July 1997 (age 28)
Silvia Pollicini (ITA)	31 December 1998 (age 27)
Ilaria Sanguineti (ITA)	15 April 1994 (age 32)
Miriam Vece (ITA)	16 March 1997 (age 29)
Alessia Vigilia (ITA)	1 September 1999 (age 26)

=== WNT–Rotor Pro Cycling ===
As of 11 March 2019.

Rider	Date of birth
Laura Asencio (FRA)	14 May 1998 (age 28)
Anna Badegruber (AUT)	14 January 1997 (age 29)
Lisa Brennauer (GER)	8 June 1988 (age 37)
Kathrin Hammes (GER)	9 January 1989 (age 37)
Clara Koppenburg (GER)	3 August 1995 (age 30)
Claudia Koster (NED)	22 March 1992 (age 34)
Erica Magnaldi (ITA)	24 August 1992 (age 33)

Rider	Date of birth
Gabrielle Pilote Fortin (CAN)	26 April 1993 (age 33)
Sarah Rijkes (AUT)	2 April 1991 (age 35)
Ane Santesteban (ESP)	12 December 1990 (age 35)
Aafke Soet (NED)	23 November 1997 (age 28)
Lea Lin Teutenberg (GER)	2 July 1999 (age 26)
Lara Vieceli (ITA)	16 July 1993 (age 32)
Kirsten Wild (NED)	15 October 1982 (age 43)
