= List of 2020 UCI Women's Teams and riders =

List of cyclists

The following is a list of 2020 UCI Women's Teams and riders for the 2020 women's road cycling season.

== World Teams ==
=== Alé BTC Ljubljana ===
As of 13 January 2020.

Rider	Date of birth
Marta Bastianelli (ITA)	30 April 1987 (age 39)
Maaike Boogaard (NED)	24 August 1998 (age 27)
Urška Bravec (SLO)	14 December 1996 (age 29)
Eugenia Bujak (POL)	25 June 1989 (age 37)
Anastasia Chursina (RUS)	7 April 1995 (age 31)
Margarita Victoria García (ESP)	2 January 1984 (age 42)

Rider	Date of birth
Tatiana Guderzo (ITA)	22 August 1984 (age 41)
Jutatip Maneephan (THA)	8 July 1988 (age 38)
Urša Pintar (SLO)	3 October 1985 (age 40)
Anna Trevisi (ITA)	8 May 1992 (age 34)
Eri Yonamine (JPN)	25 April 1991 (age 35)
Urška Žigart (SLO)	4 December 1996 (age 29)

=== Canyon–SRAM ===
As of 13 January 2020.

Rider	Date of birth
Alena Amialiusik (BLR)	6 February 1989 (age 37)
Alice Barnes (GBR)	17 July 1995 (age 30)
Hannah Barnes (GBR)	4 May 1993 (age 33)
Elena Cecchini (ITA)	25 May 1992 (age 34)
Tiffany Cromwell (AUS)	6 July 1988 (age 38)
Tanja Erath (GER)	7 October 1989 (age 36)
Pauline Ferrand-Prévot (FRA)	10 February 1992 (age 34)
Rotem Gafinovitz (ISR)	9 June 1992 (age 34)

Rider	Date of birth
Ella Harris (NZL)	18 July 1998 (age 27)
Lisa Klein (GER)	15 July 1996 (age 29)
Hannah Ludwig (GER)	15 February 2000 (age 26)
Katarzyna Niewiadoma (POL)	29 September 1994 (age 31)
Jess Pratt (AUS)	9 October 1997 (age 28)
Christa Riffel (GER)	30 July 1998 (age 27)
Alexis Ryan (USA)	18 August 1994 (age 31)
Omer Shapira (ISR)	9 September 1994 (age 31)

=== CCC Liv ===
As of 14 January 2020.

Rider	Date of birth
Sofia Bertizzolo (ITA)	21 August 1997 (age 28)
Valerie Demey (BEL)	17 January 1994 (age 32)
Marta Jaskulska (POL)	25 March 2000 (age 26)
Jeanne Korevaar (NED)	24 September 1996 (age 29)
Evy Kuijpers (NED)	15 February 1995 (age 31)
Marta Lach (POL)	26 May 1997 (age 29)
Riejanne Markus (NED)	1 September 1994 (age 31)
Ashleigh Moolman (RSA)	9 December 1985 (age 40)

Rider	Date of birth
Aurela Nerlo (POL)	11 February 1998 (age 28)
Soraya Paladin (ITA)	4 May 1993 (age 33)
Pauliena Rooijakkers (NED)	12 May 1993 (age 33)
Agnieszka Skalniak (POL)	22 April 1997 (age 29)
Sabrina Stultiens (NED)	8 July 1993 (age 33)
Inge van der Heijden (NED)	12 August 1999 (age 26)
Marianne Vos (NED)	13 May 1987 (age 39)

=== FDJ Nouvelle-Aquitaine Futuroscope ===
As of 15 January 2020.

Rider	Date of birth
Stine Borgli (NOR)	4 July 1990 (age 36)
Brodie Chapman (AUS)	9 April 1991 (age 35)
Clara Copponi (FRA)	12 January 1999 (age 27)
Eugénie Duval (FRA)	3 May 1993 (age 33)
Emilia Fahlin (SWE)	24 October 1988 (age 37)
Shara Gillow (AUS)	23 December 1987 (age 38)
Maëlle Grossetête (FRA)	10 April 1998 (age 28)

Rider	Date of birth
Victorie Guilman (FRA)	25 March 1996 (age 30)
Lauren Kitchen (AUS)	21 November 1990 (age 35)
Marie Le Net (FRA)	25 January 2000 (age 26)
Évita Muzic (FRA)	26 May 1999 (age 27)
Cecilie Uttrup Ludwig (DNK)	23 August 1995 (age 30)
Jade Wiel (FRA)	2 April 2000 (age 26)

=== Mitchelton–Scott ===
As of 15 January 2020.

Rider	Date of birth
Jessica Allen (AUS)	17 April 1993 (age 33)
Grace Brown (AUS)	7 July 1992 (age 34)
Gracie Elvin (AUS)	31 October 1988 (age 37)
Janneke Ensing (NED)	21 September 1986 (age 39)
Lucy Kennedy (AUS)	11 July 1988 (age 37)
Jessica Roberts (GBR)	11 April 1999 (age 27)

Rider	Date of birth
Sarah Roy (AUS)	27 February 1986 (age 40)
Amanda Spratt (AUS)	17 September 1987 (age 38)
Moniek Tenniglo (NED)	2 May 1988 (age 38)
Annemiek van Vleuten (NED)	8 October 1982 (age 43)
Georgia Williams (NZL)	25 August 1993 (age 32)

=== Movistar Team ===
As of 15 January 2020.

Rider	Date of birth
Katrine Aalerud (NOR)	4 December 1994 (age 31)
Aude Biannic (FRA)	27 March 1991 (age 35)
Jelena Erić (SRB)	15 January 1996 (age 30)
Alicia González Blanco (ESP)	27 May 1995 (age 31)
Barbara Guarischi (ITA)	2 October 1990 (age 35)
Sheyla Gutiérrez (ESP)	1 January 1994 (age 32)

Rider	Date of birth
Eider Merino Cortazar (ESP)	2 August 1994 (age 31)
Lourdes Oyarbide (ESP)	8 April 1994 (age 32)
Paula Patiño (COL)	29 March 1997 (age 29)
Gloria Rodríguez (ESP)	6 March 1992 (age 34)
Alba Teruel Ribes (ESP)	17 August 1996 (age 29)

=== Team Sunweb ===
As of 15 January 2020.

Rider	Date of birth
Susanne Andersen (NOR)	23 July 1998 (age 27)
Pfeiffer Georgi (GBR)	27 September 2000 (age 25)
Anna Henderson (GBR)	14 November 1998 (age 27)
Alison Jackson (CAN)	14 December 1988 (age 37)
Leah Kirchmann (CAN)	30 June 1990 (age 36)
Franziska Koch (GER)	13 July 2000 (age 25)
Juliette Labous (FRA)	4 November 1998 (age 27)

Rider	Date of birth
Liane Lippert (GER)	13 January 1998 (age 28)
Floortje Mackaij (NED)	18 October 1995 (age 30)
Pernille Mathiesen (DEN)	5 October 1997 (age 28)
Wilma Olausson (SWE)	9 April 2001 (age 25)
Coryn Rivera (USA)	26 August 1992 (age 33)
Julia Soek (NED)	12 December 1990 (age 35)

=== Trek–Segafredo ===
As of 15 January 2020.

Rider	Date of birth
Elynor Bäckstedt (GBR)	6 December 2001 (age 24)
Lucinda Brand (NED)	2 July 1989 (age 37)
Audrey Cordon-Ragot (FRA)	22 September 1989 (age 36)
Lizzie Deignan (GBR)	18 December 1988 (age 37)
Lauretta Hanson (AUS)	29 October 1994 (age 31)
Lotta Henttala (FIN)	28 June 1989 (age 37)
Elisa Longo Borghini (ITA)	10 December 1991 (age 34)

Rider	Date of birth
Letizia Paternoster (ITA)	22 July 1999 (age 26)
Anna Plichta (POL)	10 February 1992 (age 34)
Ellen van Dijk (NED)	11 February 1987 (age 39)
Abi Van Twisk (GBR)	1 March 1997 (age 29)
Tayler Wiles (USA)	20 July 1989 (age 36)
Ruth Winder (USA)	9 July 1993 (age 33)
Trixi Worrack (GER)	28 September 1981 (age 44)

== Continental Teams ==
=== Agolico ===
As of 18 January 2020.

Rider	Date of birth
Yareli Acevedo (MEX)	29 July 2001 (age 24)
Denisse Ahumada (CHI)	8 April 1993 (age 33)
Anet Barrera (MEX)	9 September 1998 (age 27)
Maria Gaxiola (MEX)	20 May 1997 (age 29)
Ariadna Gutiérrez (MEX)	22 August 1991 (age 34)

Rider	Date of birth
Jennifer Morales (CRC)	26 August 1997 (age 28)
Marcela Prieto (MEX)	11 March 1992 (age 34)
Andrea Ramírez (MEX)	25 September 1999 (age 26)
María José Vargas (CRC)	15 February 1996 (age 30)

=== Aromitalia–Basso Bikes–Vaiano ===
As of 18 January 2020.

Rider	Date of birth
Michela Balducci (ITA)	30 March 1995 (age 31)
Letizia Borghesi (ITA)	16 October 1998 (age 27)
Angelica Brogi (ITA)	20 October 1998 (age 27)
Anastasia Carbonari (ITA)	11 September 1999 (age 26)
Carmela Cipriani (ITA)	11 November 1996 (age 29)
Sofia Collinelli (ITA)	24 August 2001 (age 24)
Nicole D'Agostin (ITA)	1 February 1999 (age 27)

Rider	Date of birth
Rasa Leleivytė (LTU)	22 July 1988 (age 37)
Elena Lucchinelli (ITA)	24 October 2001 (age 24)
Giulia Marchesini (ITA)	14 May 1998 (age 28)
Emilia Matteoli (ITA)	12 November 1999 (age 26)
Silvija Pacevičienė (LTU)	20 November 1993 (age 32)
Gemma Sernissi (ITA)	6 March 2000 (age 26)

=== Astana ===
As of 18 January 2020.

Rider	Date of birth
Olivija Baleišytė (LTU)	3 September 1998 (age 27)
Maryna Ivaniuk (UKR)	19 September 1990 (age 35)
Liliana Moreno (COL)	8 July 1992 (age 34)
Svetlana Pachshenko (KAZ)	26 July 2000 (age 25)
Francesca Pattaro (ITA)	12 March 1995 (age 31)
Katia Ragusa (ITA)	19 May 1997 (age 29)

Rider	Date of birth
Natalya Saifutdinova (KAZ)	11 February 1989 (age 37)
Lizbeth Salazar (MEX)	8 December 1996 (age 29)
Arlenis Sierra (CUB)	7 December 1992 (age 33)
Yeima Torres (CUB)	31 July 1987 (age 38)
Makhabbat Umutzhanova (KAZ)	11 August 1994 (age 31)

=== Bepink ===
As of 19 January 2020.

Rider	Date of birth
Camilla Alessio (ITA)	23 July 2001 (age 24)
Grace Anderson (NZL)	9 July 1997 (age 29)
Vania Canvelli (ITA)	21 October 1997 (age 28)
Giorgia Catarzi (ITA)	15 June 2001 (age 25)
Simona Frapporti (ITA)	14 July 1988 (age 37)

Rider	Date of birth
Markéta Hájková (CZE)	14 March 2000 (age 26)
Chiara Perini (ITA)	9 December 1997 (age 28)
Silvia Valsecchi (ITA)	19 July 1982 (age 43)
Melissa van Neck (CZE)	13 October 1991 (age 34)
Silvia Zanardi (ITA)	3 March 2000 (age 26)

=== Biehler Krush Pro Cycling ===
As of 19 January 2020.

Rider	Date of birth
Marissa Baks (NED)	5 December 1998 (age 27)
Inez Beijer (NED)	22 November 1995 (age 30)
Henrietta Colborne (GBR)	20 April 1998 (age 28)
Senna Feron (NED)	26 October 1995 (age 30)
Merel Hofman (NED)	4 January 1998 (age 28)
Roos Hoogeboom (NED)	16 August 1982 (age 43)

Rider	Date of birth
Melanie Klement (NED)	3 May 1994 (age 32)
Quinty Ton (NED)	4 August 1998 (age 27)
Maike van der Duin (NED)	12 September 2001 (age 24)
Laura van Regenmortel (NED)	26 June 1992 (age 34)
Nienke Wasmus (NED)	23 October 1999 (age 26)

=== Bigla–Katusha ===
As of 19 January 2020.

Rider	Date of birth
Martina Alzini (ITA)	10 February 1997 (age 29)
Lizzy Banks (GBR)	7 November 1990 (age 35)
Elise Chabbey (SUI)	24 April 1993 (age 33)
Niamh Fisher-Black (NZL)	12 August 2000 (age 25)
Mikayla Harvey (NZL)	7 September 1998 (age 27)
Clara Koppenburg (GER)	3 August 1995 (age 30)
Emma Cecilie Norsgaard (DNK)	26 July 1999 (age 26)

Rider	Date of birth
Nikola Nosková (CZE)	1 July 1997 (age 29)
Marlen Reusser (SUI)	20 September 1991 (age 34)
Maria Vittoria Sperotto (ITA)	20 November 1996 (age 29)
Kathrin Stirnemann (SUI)	22 October 1989 (age 36)
Leah Thomas (USA)	30 May 1989 (age 37)
Sophie Wright (GBR)	15 March 1999 (age 27)

=== Bizkaia–Durango ===
As of 19 January 2020.

Rider	Date of birth
Alice Maria Arzuffi (ITA)	19 November 1994 (age 31)
Yurani Blanco (ESP)	3 February 1998 (age 28)
Lauren Dolan (GBR)	19 September 1999 (age 26)
Ariana Gilabert (ESP)	12 April 2000 (age 26)
Lucía González Blanco (ESP)	9 July 1990 (age 36)
Aroa Gorostiza (ESP)	7 May 1999 (age 27)
Lizzie Holden (GBR)	12 September 1997 (age 28)

Rider	Date of birth
Amaia Lartitegi (ESP)	12 March 2001 (age 25)
Irene Loizate (ESP)	17 May 1995 (age 31)
Amy Monkhouse (GBR)	6 May 2001 (age 25)
Carla Oberholzer (RSA)	14 January 1987 (age 39)
Irati Puigdefábregas (ESP)	24 September 2001 (age 24)
Paula Sanmartín (ESP)	16 May 1997 (age 29)

=== Boels–Dolmans ===
As of 20 January 2020.

Rider	Date of birth
Eva Buurman (NED)	7 September 1994 (age 31)
Karol-Ann Canuel (CAN)	18 April 1988 (age 38)
Jolien D'Hoore (BEL)	14 March 1990 (age 36)
Amalie Dideriksen (DNK)	24 May 1996 (age 30)
Katie Hall (USA)	6 January 1987 (age 39)
Christine Majerus (LUX)	25 February 1987 (age 39)

Rider	Date of birth
Amy Pieters (NED)	1 June 1991 (age 35)
Skylar Schneider (USA)	3 September 1998 (age 27)
Lonneke Uneken (NED)	2 March 2000 (age 26)
Jip van den Bos (NED)	12 April 1996 (age 30)
Chantal van den Broek-Blaak (NED)	22 October 1989 (age 36)
Anna van der Breggen (NED)	18 April 1990 (age 36)

=== CAMS–Tifosi ===
As of 20 January 2020.

Rider	Date of birth
Megan Barker (GBR)	15 August 1997 (age 28)
Rebecca Durrell (GBR)	25 August 1988 (age 37)
Jessica Finney (GBR)	7 December 1995 (age 30)
Illi Gardner (GBR)	14 October 1999 (age 26)
Grace Garner (GBR)	19 June 1997 (age 29)
Natalie Grinczer (GBR)	15 November 1993 (age 32)

Rider	Date of birth
Charmaine Porter (GBR)	26 June 1995 (age 31)
Jennifer Powell (GBR)	29 September 1987 (age 38)
Katie Scott (GBR)	20 April 2001 (age 25)
Gabriella Shaw (GBR)	22 June 1992 (age 34)
Jo Tindley (GBR)	1 May 1987 (age 39)

=== Ceratizit–WNT Pro Cycling ===
As of 21 January 2020.

Rider	Date of birth
Laura Asencio (FRA)	14 May 1998 (age 28)
Franziska Brauße (GER)	20 November 1998 (age 27)
Lisa Brennauer (GER)	8 June 1988 (age 38)
Maria Giulia Confalonieri (ITA)	30 March 1993 (age 33)
Kathrin Hammes (GER)	9 January 1989 (age 37)
Claudia Koster (NED)	22 March 1992 (age 34)
Julie Leth (DNK)	13 July 1992 (age 33)

Rider	Date of birth
Erica Magnaldi (ITA)	24 August 1992 (age 33)
Sarah Rijkes (AUT)	2 April 1991 (age 35)
Ane Santesteban (ESP)	12 December 1990 (age 35)
Aafke Soet (NED)	23 November 1997 (age 28)
Lea Lin Teutenberg (GER)	2 July 1999 (age 27)
Lara Vieceli (ITA)	16 July 1993 (age 32)
Kirsten Wild (NED)	15 October 1982 (age 43)

=== Charente–Maritime Women Cycling ===
As of 21 January 2020.

Rider	Date of birth
Noémie Abgrall (FRA)	1 December 1999 (age 26)
Alice Cobb (GBR)	31 July 1995 (age 30)
Alice Coutinho (FRA)	13 September 2000 (age 25)
Coralie Demay (FRA)	10 October 1992 (age 33)
Séverine Eraud (FRA)	24 February 1995 (age 31)
India Grangier (FRA)	5 January 2000 (age 26)

Rider	Date of birth
Sarah Inghelbrecht (BEL)	1 October 1992 (age 33)
Lucie Lahaye (FRA)	21 November 1997 (age 28)
Célia Le Mouel (FRA)	20 July 2000 (age 25)
Manon Minaud (FRA)	21 October 1998 (age 27)
Marine Quiniou (FRA)	26 August 1993 (age 32)
Balladyne Tritsch (FRA)	6 May 1995 (age 31)

=== Chevalmeire Cycling Team ===
As of 21 January 2020.

Rider	Date of birth
Nathalie Bex (BEL)	12 April 1998 (age 28)
Demi de Jong (NED)	11 February 1995 (age 31)
Thalita de Jong (NED)	6 November 1993 (age 32)
Demmy Druyts (BEL)	4 October 1995 (age 30)
Kelly Druyts (BEL)	21 October 1989 (age 36)
Lenny Druyts (BEL)	18 May 1997 (age 29)
Puck Moonen (NED)	20 March 1996 (age 30)

Rider	Date of birth
Sara Mustonen (SWE)	8 February 1981 (age 45)
Rossella Ratto (ITA)	20 October 1993 (age 32)
Febe Schokkaert (BEL)	5 December 1999 (age 26)
Rozanne Slik (NED)	12 April 1991 (age 35)
Kelly Van den Steen (BEL)	1 September 1995 (age 30)
Natalie van Gogh (NED)	14 September 1974 (age 51)

=== Ciclotel ===
As of 22 January 2020.

Rider	Date of birth
Kim de Baat (BEL)	29 May 1991 (age 35)
Stéphanie Duprez (BEL)	25 August 1987 (age 38)
Valeriya Kononenko (UKR)	14 May 1990 (age 36)
Olha Kulynych (UKR)	1 January 2000 (age 26)
Maroesjka Matthee (RSA)	10 January 1989 (age 37)
Daniela Reis (POR)	6 April 1993 (age 33)

Rider	Date of birth
Alice Sharpe (IRL)	3 May 1994 (age 32)
Hayley Simmonds (GBR)	22 July 1988 (age 37)
Sara Van de Vel (BEL)	6 August 1994 (age 31)
Kirstie van Haaften (NED)	21 January 1999 (age 27)
Bryony van Velzen (NED)	14 May 1996 (age 30)

=== Cogeas–Mettler–Look ===
As of 23 January 2020.

Rider	Date of birth
Gulnaz Badykova (RUS)	21 April 1994 (age 32)
Victoire Barbe (FRA)	26 April 1999 (age 27)
Marie-Soleil Blais (CAN)	21 November 1988 (age 37)
Annabel Fisher (GBR)	19 September 1989 (age 36)
Iuliia Galimullina (RUS)	20 September 2001 (age 24)
Aigul Gareeva (RUS)	22 August 2001 (age 24)
Katharina Hechler (GER)	10 March 2000 (age 26)
Diana Klimova (RUS)	8 October 1996 (age 29)
Lara Krähemann (SUI)	12 October 1999 (age 26)
Daria Malkova (RUS)	16 November 2000 (age 25)
Mariia Miliaeva (RUS)	16 July 2001 (age 24)

Rider	Date of birth
Amber Neben (USA)	18 February 1975 (age 51)
Maria Novolodskaya (RUS)	28 July 1999 (age 26)
Edwige Pitel (FRA)	4 June 1967 (age 59)
Mia Radotić (CRO)	2 December 1984 (age 41)
Noemi Rüegg (SUI)	19 April 2001 (age 25)
Alena Rytseva (RUS)	6 June 2000 (age 26)
Sari Saarelainen (FIN)	1 March 1981 (age 45)
Eléa Schneeberger (SUI)	31 August 1998 (age 27)
Marina Uvarova (RUS)	9 November 2000 (age 25)
Olga Zabelinskaya (UZB)	10 May 1980 (age 46)

=== DNA Pro Cycling ===
As of 23 January 2020.

Rider	Date of birth
Katie Clouse (USA)	4 August 2001 (age 24)
Margot Clyne (USA)	27 February 1995 (age 31)
Maggie Coles-Lyster (CAN)	12 February 1999 (age 27)
Michaela Drummond (NZL)	5 April 1998 (age 28)
Heather Fischer (USA)	28 November 1988 (age 37)
Sarah Kaufmann (USA)	16 May 1981 (age 45)

Rider	Date of birth
Mia Kilburg (USA)	27 October 1989 (age 36)
Kimberly Lucie (USA)	21 April 1986 (age 40)
Hanna Muegge (GER)	28 May 1989 (age 37)
Liza Rachetto (USA)	30 January 1974 (age 52)
Nicole Shields (NZL)	9 September 1999 (age 26)
Brenna Wrye-Simpson (USA)	14 November 1987 (age 38)

=== Doltcini–Van Eyck ===
As of 25 January 2020.

Rider	Date of birth
Minke Bakker (NED)	11 March 1997 (age 29)
Victoire Berteau (FRA)	16 August 2000 (age 25)
Antri Christoforou (CYP)	2 April 1992 (age 34)
Mieke Docx (BEL)	8 June 1996 (age 30)
Kaat Hannes (BEL)	21 November 1991 (age 34)
Nicole Hanselmann (SUI)	6 May 1991 (age 35)
Jade Lenaers (BEL)	30 November 2001 (age 24)
Kelly Markus (NED)	7 February 1993 (age 33)
Jenna Merrick (NZL)	25 February 2000 (age 26)

Rider	Date of birth
Dina Scavone (BEL)	10 August 2001 (age 24)
Christina Schweinberger (AUT)	29 October 1996 (age 29)
Kathrin Schweinberger (AUT)	29 October 1996 (age 29)
Nicole Steigenga (NED)	27 January 1998 (age 28)
Zsófia Szabó (HUN)	3 January 1997 (age 29)
Marieke van Witzenburg-de Groot (NED)	29 October 1985 (age 40)
Kata Blanka Vas (HUN)	3 September 2001 (age 24)
Justine Vromanne (BEL)	19 July 2001 (age 24)

=== Drops ===
As of 26 January 2020.

Rider	Date of birth
Lizzy Bennett (GBR)	18 August 1999 (age 26)
Anna Christian (GBR)	6 August 1995 (age 30)
Joscelin Lowden (GBR)	3 October 1987 (age 38)
Maria Martins (POR)	9 July 1999 (age 27)
Emily Meakin (GBR)	18 December 1988 (age 37)
Emilie Moberg (NOR)	12 July 1991 (age 34)

Rider	Date of birth
Elise Marie Olsen (NOR)	13 February 2001 (age 25)
Sara Penton (SWE)	15 November 1988 (age 37)
Finja Smekal (GER)	28 February 2001 (age 25)
April Tacey (GBR)	12 October 2000 (age 25)
Marjolein van't Geloof (NED)	27 March 1996 (age 30)

=== Eneicat–RBH Global ===
As of 27 January 2020.

Rider	Date of birth
Anna Baidak (RUS)	13 November 2000 (age 25)
Maria Brizuela (ESP)	28 October 2001 (age 24)
Alessia Bulleri (ITA)	19 July 1993 (age 32)
Varvara Fasoi (GRE)	2 February 1991 (age 35)
Mayuko Hagiwara (JPN)	16 October 1986 (age 39)
Ziortza Isasi (ESP)	5 August 1995 (age 30)

Rider	Date of birth
Lija Laizāne (LAT)	6 July 1993 (age 33)
Eukene Larrarte (ESP)	13 September 1998 (age 27)
Sofia Martínez (ESP)	14 February 2001 (age 25)
Anastasiia Pliaskina (RUS)	21 February 1996 (age 30)
Paula Soler (ESP)	2 June 2001 (age 25)
María Paula Tobías (MEX)	25 February 2000 (age 26)

=== Eurotarget–Bianchi–Vittoria ===
As of 27 January 2020.

Rider	Date of birth
Martina Bassi (ITA)	12 December 2001 (age 24)
Martina Fidanza (ITA)	5 November 1999 (age 26)
Elena Franchi (ITA)	26 August 1996 (age 29)
Alice Gasparini (ITA)	14 December 1997 (age 28)
Patrizia Parravan (ITA)	20 October 2003 (age 22)
Francesca Pisciali (ITA)	19 May 1998 (age 28)

Rider	Date of birth
Beatrice Rossato (ITA)	6 November 1996 (age 29)
Maria Rostovtseva (RUS)	14 May 1999 (age 27)
Arianna Sessi (ITA)	8 October 1999 (age 26)
Lina Svarinska (LAT)	15 March 2001 (age 25)
Greta Tebaldi (ITA)	5 January 2002 (age 24)
Emanuela Zanetti (ITA)	13 March 2000 (age 26)

=== Hitec Products–Birk Sport ===
As of 28 January 2020.

Rider	Date of birth
Thale Bjerk (NOR)	19 August 2000 (age 25)
Pernille Feldmann (NOR)	1 February 2000 (age 26)
Ingvild Gåskjenn (NOR)	1 July 1998 (age 28)
Vita Heine (NOR)	21 November 1984 (age 41)
Mieke Kröger (GER)	18 July 1993 (age 32)
Ingrid Lorvik (NOR)	21 February 1986 (age 40)
Amalie Lutro (NOR)	15 March 2000 (age 26)

Rider	Date of birth
Silje Mathisen (NOR)	15 February 2001 (age 25)
Natalie Midtsveen (NOR)	25 June 2001 (age 25)
Greta Richioud (FRA)	11 October 1996 (age 29)
Julie Meyer Solvang (NOR)	3 September 1989 (age 36)
Marta Tagliaferro (ITA)	4 November 1989 (age 36)
Lucy van der Haar (GBR)	20 September 1994 (age 31)

=== InstaFund La Prima ===
As of 28 January 2020.

Rider	Date of birth
Ngaire Barraclough (CAN)	20 July 2002 (age 23)
Isabella Bertold (CAN)	4 February 1991 (age 35)
Esta Bovill (CAN)	23 September 1975 (age 50)
Claire Cameron (CAN)	8 March 1981 (age 45)
Gillian Ellsay (CAN)	26 March 1997 (age 29)
Elizabeth Gin (CAN)	2 February 2001 (age 25)

Rider	Date of birth
Kristen Kit (CAN)	18 August 1988 (age 37)
Rachel Langdon (GBR)	25 September 1988 (age 37)
Beth Ann Orton (USA)	15 August 1981 (age 44)
Anna Talman (CAN)	11 September 1997 (age 28)
Sonia Taylor (CAN)	2 June 1989 (age 37)
Gabby Traxler (CAN)	10 May 1998 (age 28)

=== Lotto–Soudal Ladies ===
As of 28 January 2020.

Rider	Date of birth
Teuntje Beekhuis (NED)	18 August 1995 (age 30)
Danique Braam (NED)	5 September 1995 (age 30)
Alana Castrique (BEL)	8 May 1999 (age 27)
Dani Christmas (GBR)	21 December 1987 (age 38)
Annelies Dom (BEL)	8 April 1986 (age 40)
Arianna Fidanza (ITA)	6 January 1995 (age 31)
Lotte Kopecky (BEL)	10 November 1995 (age 30)

Rider	Date of birth
Lone Meertens (BEL)	16 April 1998 (age 28)
Nguyễn Thị Thật (VIE)	6 March 1993 (age 33)
Abby-Mae Parkinson (GBR)	30 July 1997 (age 28)
Christina Siggaard (DNK)	24 March 1994 (age 32)
Julie Van de Velde (BEL)	2 June 1993 (age 33)
Cameron Vandenbroucke (BEL)	10 February 1999 (age 27)
Jesse Vandenbulcke (BEL)	17 January 1996 (age 30)

=== Lviv Cycling Team ===
As of 30 January 2020.

Rider	Date of birth
Julia Biryukova (UKR)	24 January 1998 (age 28)
Viktoriya Bondar (UKR)	25 September 1995 (age 30)
Megan Chard (GBR)	6 January 1998 (age 28)
Naomi de Roeck (BEL)	23 October 1990 (age 35)
Ellen Feytens (BEL)	20 September 2000 (age 25)
Špela Kern (SLO)	24 February 1990 (age 36)
Tetyana Klimchenko (UKR)	8 May 1994 (age 32)
Oksana Klyachina (UKR)	11 September 1997 (age 28)

Rider	Date of birth
Solomiia Lukachuk (UKR)	30 April 2001 (age 25)
Anna Nahirna (UKR)	30 September 1988 (age 37)
Estefania Pilz (ARG)	7 August 1985 (age 40)
Iryna Semionova (UKR)	19 April 1990 (age 36)
Olena Sharha (UKR)	24 December 1986 (age 39)
Femke Verstichelen (BEL)	22 March 1984 (age 42)
Viktoriia Yaroshenko (UKR)	12 July 1999 (age 26)

=== Macogep Tornatech Girondins de Bordeaux ===
As of 1 February 2020.

Rider	Date of birth
Olivia Baril (CAN)	10 October 1997 (age 28)
Marion Bessone (FRA)	8 November 1988 (age 37)
Luce Bourbeau (CAN)	6 March 1991 (age 35)
Lyse-Ann Coffin (CAN)	12 October 2001 (age 24)
Basma El Ghouate (FRA)	21 March 2002 (age 24)
Émilie Fortin (CAN)	21 May 1999 (age 27)

Rider	Date of birth
Frédérique Larose-Gingras (CAN)	12 January 1994 (age 32)
Juliette Larose-Gingras (CAN)	26 November 2002 (age 23)
Mireille Larose-Gingras (CAN)	18 February 2000 (age 26)
Ann-Pascale Ouellet (CAN)	10 November 1999 (age 26)
Callie Swan (CAN)	9 March 1998 (age 28)

=== Massi–Tactic ===
As of 2 February 2020.

Rider	Date of birth
Mireia Benito (ESP)	30 December 1996 (age 29)
Lauren Creamer (IRL)	20 January 1992 (age 34)
Agua Marina Espínola (PAR)	31 March 1996 (age 30)
Noemí Ferré (ESP)	24 November 1991 (age 34)
Marina Isan Berga (ESP)	12 April 1994 (age 32)
Belén López (ESP)	18 April 1984 (age 42)
Isabel Martín (ESP)	1 May 1999 (age 27)
Nerea Nuño (ESP)	12 July 1994 (age 31)

Rider	Date of birth
Patricia Ortega (ESP)	15 September 1988 (age 37)
Karolina Perekitko (POL)	1 October 1998 (age 27)
Gabrielle Pilote Fortin (CAN)	26 April 1993 (age 33)
Teresa Ripoll Sabate (ESP)	3 February 1997 (age 29)
Ariadna Trias (ESP)	27 April 1995 (age 31)
Mireia Trias (ESP)	22 March 2000 (age 26)
Chloë Turblin (FRA)	19 September 1995 (age 30)

=== Minsk Cycling Club ===
As of 2 February 2020.

Rider	Date of birth
Alina Abramenka (BLR)	26 October 2000 (age 25)
Darya Dziakola (BLR)	29 December 2000 (age 25)
Nastassia Kiptsikava (BLR)	10 August 1999 (age 26)
Taisa Naskovich (BLR)	19 September 1995 (age 30)

Rider	Date of birth
Karalina Savenka (BLR)	21 April 1998 (age 28)
Tatsiana Sharakova (BLR)	31 July 1984 (age 41)
Alesia Shaurka (BLR)	12 October 2001 (age 24)
Hanna Tserakh (BLR)	7 September 1998 (age 27)

=== Multum Accountants–LSK Ladies Cycling Team ===
As of 2 February 2020.

Rider	Date of birth
Amber Aernouts (BEL)	25 October 2000 (age 25)
Anna Badegruber (AUT)	14 January 1997 (age 29)
Lara Defour (BEL)	12 November 1997 (age 28)
Fien Delbaere (BEL)	21 April 1996 (age 30)
Jessy Druyts (BEL)	22 January 1994 (age 32)
Désirée Ehrler (SUI)	20 August 1991 (age 34)
Alicia Evans (NZL)	2 July 1987 (age 39)
Hanna Johansson (SWE)	7 February 1985 (age 41)
Bronwyn Macgregor (NZL)	12 November 1982 (age 43)

Rider	Date of birth
Eeva Sarlin (FIN)	31 July 1991 (age 34)
Josie Shepherd (GBR)	10 July 2000 (age 26)
Julie Stockman (BEL)	17 August 1999 (age 26)
Laura Süßemilch (GER)	23 February 1997 (age 29)
Kim Van den Steen (BEL)	26 May 1994 (age 32)
Céline van Houtum (NED)	12 March 1997 (age 29)
Aurore Verhoeven (FRA)	15 January 1990 (age 36)
Kylie Waterreus (NED)	22 March 1998 (age 28)

=== NXTG Racing ===
As of 2 February 2020.

Rider	Date of birth
Rozemarijn Ammerlaan (NED)	4 January 2000 (age 26)
Julia Borgström (SWE)	9 June 2001 (age 25)
Shari Bossuyt (BEL)	5 September 2000 (age 25)
Cathalijne Hoolwerf (NED)	26 February 2000 (age 26)

Rider	Date of birth
Eva Jonkers (NED)	7 October 2000 (age 25)
Britt Knaven (BEL)	29 July 2000 (age 25)
Charlotte Kool (NED)	6 May 1999 (age 27)
Emily Wadsworth (GBR)	8 August 1999 (age 26)

=== Parkhotel Valkenburg ===
As of 2 February 2020.

Rider	Date of birth
Nina Buysman (NED)	16 November 1997 (age 28)
Sophie de Boer (NED)	12 December 1990 (age 35)
Belle de Gast (NED)	4 February 1991 (age 35)
Ann-Sophie Duyck (BEL)	23 July 1987 (age 38)
Romy Kasper (GER)	5 May 1988 (age 38)
Anouska Koster (NED)	20 August 1993 (age 32)
Femke Markus (NED)	17 November 1996 (age 29)
Fleur Nagengast (NED)	28 January 1998 (age 28)
Hanna Nilsson (SWE)	16 February 1992 (age 34)

Rider	Date of birth
Marit Raaijmakers (NED)	2 June 1999 (age 27)
Karlijn Swinkels (NED)	28 October 1998 (age 27)
Sylvie Swinkels (NED)	31 July 2000 (age 25)
Nancy van der Burg (NED)	18 May 1992 (age 34)
Amber van der Hulst (NED)	21 September 1999 (age 26)
Esther van Veen (NED)	27 September 1990 (age 35)
Demi Vollering (NED)	15 November 1996 (age 29)
Lorena Wiebes (NED)	17 March 1999 (age 27)

=== Pro Cycling Team Fanini ===
As of 8 July 2019.

Rider	Date of birth
Lisa Allkokondi (ALB)	17 May 1995 (age 31)
Simona Bortolotti (ITA)	6 December 1994 (age 31)
Sofia Cilenti (ITA)	20 January 1995 (age 31)
Lisa De Ranieri (ITA)	30 July 1997 (age 28)
Keti Fetishi (ALB)	15 April 1997 (age 29)
Silvia Folloni (ITA)	21 June 1995 (age 31)
Leonora Geppi (ITA)	9 December 1999 (age 26)
Joli Karafili (ALB)	6 October 1995 (age 30)

Rider	Date of birth
Xhorxhia Kristollari (ALB)	2 May 1995 (age 31)
Xhejna Metalja (ALB)	6 February 1997 (age 29)
Claudia Meucci (ITA)	22 January 1999 (age 27)
Loreta Pirro (ALB)	15 November 1997 (age 28)
Jona Rizvanolli (ALB)	2 May 1992 (age 34)
Elona Rusta (ALB)	3 September 1996 (age 29)
Basei Marzia Salton (ITA)	7 July 1997 (age 29)

=== Rally Cycling ===
As of 3 February 2020.

Rider	Date of birth
Sara Bergen (CAN)	6 December 1988 (age 37)
Allison Beveridge (CAN)	1 June 1993 (age 33)
Kristabel Doebel-Hickok (USA)	28 April 1989 (age 37)
Heidi Franz (USA)	14 January 1995 (age 31)
Leigh Ann Ganzar (USA)	8 September 1989 (age 36)

Rider	Date of birth
Chloe Hosking (AUS)	1 October 1990 (age 35)
Megan Jastrab (USA)	29 January 2002 (age 24)
Sara Poidevin (CAN)	7 May 1996 (age 30)
Emma White (USA)	23 August 1997 (age 28)
Lily Williams (USA)	24 June 1994 (age 32)

=== Río Miera–Cantabria Deporte ===
As of 5 February 2020.

Rider	Date of birth
Sofía Barriguete (ESP)	5 July 2000 (age 26)
Lorena de la Fuente (ESP)	11 June 2001 (age 25)
Paula Díaz (ESP)	3 January 1997 (age 29)
Elisabet Escursell Valero (ESP)	30 October 1996 (age 29)
Carolina Esteban (ESP)	15 February 2001 (age 25)
Carla Fernández (ESP)	25 March 2001 (age 25)

Rider	Date of birth
María Medina (ESP)	1 January 1990 (age 36)
Irene Méndez (ESP)	14 May 1992 (age 34)
Aida Nuño Palacio (ESP)	24 November 1983 (age 42)
Elena Pérez (ESP)	6 August 1993 (age 32)
Susana Pérez (ESP)	15 November 2001 (age 24)
Sandra Trevilla (ESP)	7 April 1992 (age 34)

=== Roxsolt Attaquer ===
As of 5 February 2020.

Rider	Date of birth
Justine Barrow (AUS)	7 March 1979 (age 47)
Neve Bradbury (AUS)	11 April 2002 (age 24)
Emma Chilton (AUS)	10 June 1998 (age 28)
Emily Herfoss (AUS)	24 July 1994 (age 31)
Veronica Lebedev (AUS)	9 March 1996 (age 30)
Nicola Macdonald (AUS)	2 June 1998 (age 28)

Rider	Date of birth
Josephine Meldgaard (NZL)	24 January 1982 (age 44)
Peta Mullens (AUS)	8 March 1988 (age 38)
Franky Sewell (AUS)	18 December 2002 (age 23)
Bree Wilson (AUS)	21 June 1987 (age 39)
Madeline Wright (AUS)	21 August 1985 (age 40)

=== Servetto–Piumate–Beltrami TSA ===
As of 6 February 2020.

Rider	Date of birth
Francesca Baroni (ITA)	4 November 1999 (age 26)
Sara Casasola (ITA)	29 November 1999 (age 26)
Kseniya Dobrynina (RUS)	11 January 1994 (age 32)
Nicole Fede (ITA)	19 September 2000 (age 25)
Sonia Gai (ITA)	18 April 2000 (age 26)

Rider	Date of birth
Mónika Király (HUN)	10 November 1983 (age 42)
Milagro Mena (CRC)	30 April 1993 (age 33)
Rosalia Ortíz (ESP)	20 March 1999 (age 27)
Anna Potokina (RUS)	18 June 1987 (age 39)

=== Sopela Women's Team ===
As of 8 February 2020.

Rider	Date of birth
Naia Amondarain (ESP)	13 February 2001 (age 25)
María Banlles (ESP)	15 September 2000 (age 25)
Andere Basterra (ESP)	5 October 2000 (age 25)
Garazi Erostarbe (ESP)	7 November 2000 (age 25)
Isabel Ferreres (ESP)	8 October 1998 (age 27)
Amaia Malatsetxebarria (ESP)	9 December 2000 (age 25)

Rider	Date of birth
Sara Martín (ESP)	22 March 1999 (age 27)
Alexandra Moreno (ESP)	25 January 2000 (age 26)
Mireia Muñoz (ESP)	24 December 1998 (age 27)
Emma Ortíz (ESP)	28 November 1998 (age 27)
Sofia Rodríguez (ESP)	21 October 1999 (age 26)
Claire Steels (GBR)	9 November 1986 (age 39)

=== Team Arkéa ===
As of 9 February 2020.

Rider	Date of birth
Pauline Allin (FRA)	2 May 1995 (age 31)
Charlotte Becker (GER)	19 May 1983 (age 43)
Léa Curinier (FRA)	21 April 2001 (age 25)
Fatima Zahra El Hayani (MAR)	23 July 1996 (age 29)
Amandine Fouquenet (FRA)	19 February 2001 (age 25)
Coralie Houdin (FRA)	9 July 1995 (age 31)

Rider	Date of birth
Lucie Jounier (FRA)	16 July 1998 (age 27)
Typhaine Laurance (FRA)	28 August 1998 (age 27)
Sandra Lévénez (FRA)	5 July 1979 (age 47)
Anaïs Morichon (FRA)	6 October 1999 (age 26)
Gladys Verhulst (FRA)	2 January 1997 (age 29)

=== Team Illuminate ===
As of 9 February 2020.

Rider	Date of birth
Kulacha Chairin (THA)	16 November 1988 (age 37)
Tatiana Dueñas (COL)	31 March 1998 (age 28)
Shoko Kashiki (JPN)	9 November 1993 (age 32)
Kemille King (USA)	2 January 1977 (age 49)

Rider	Date of birth
Emma Langley (USA)	23 November 1995 (age 30)
Jessica Parra (COL)	10 August 1995 (age 30)
Doris Schweizer (SUI)	28 August 1989 (age 36)
Starla Teddergreen (USA)	11 December 1979 (age 46)

=== Thailand Women's Cycling Team ===
As of 10 February 2020.

Rider	Date of birth
Chaniporn Batriya (THA)	12 August 1999 (age 26)
Kanyarat Gatethonglang (THA)	6 October 1999 (age 26)
Sarocha Kamonkhon (THA)	15 August 1997 (age 28)
Wilaiwan Kunlapha (THA)	25 December 1987 (age 38)

Rider	Date of birth
Chanpeng Nontasin (THA)	9 October 1984 (age 41)
Supaksorn Nuntana (THA)	8 December 1989 (age 36)
Ayustina Priatna (INA)	12 December 1997 (age 28)
Phetdarin Somrat (THA)	6 June 1995 (age 31)

=== Tibco–Silicon Valley Bank ===
As of 9 February 2020.

Rider	Date of birth
Nicolle Bruderer (GUA)	15 August 1993 (age 32)
Erica Clevenger (USA)	1 May 1994 (age 32)
Jenelle Crooks (AUS)	2 July 1994 (age 32)
Leah Dixon (GBR)	26 August 1991 (age 34)
Kristen Faulkner (USA)	18 December 1992 (age 33)
Sarah Gigante (AUS)	6 October 2000 (age 25)
Nina Kessler (NED)	4 July 1988 (age 38)

Rider	Date of birth
Sharlotte Lucas (NZL)	25 July 1991 (age 34)
Shannon Malseed (AUS)	27 December 1994 (age 31)
Emily Newsom (USA)	4 September 1983 (age 42)
Diana Peñuela (COL)	8 September 1986 (age 39)
Kendall Ryan (USA)	10 August 1992 (age 33)
Lauren Stephens (USA)	28 December 1986 (age 39)

=== Top Girls Fassa Bortolo ===
As of 11 February 2020.

Rider	Date of birth
Giorgia Bariani (ITA)	19 November 2000 (age 25)
Elisa Dalla Valle (ITA)	16 January 1998 (age 28)
Elena Leonardi (ITA)	7 December 1995 (age 30)
Greta Marturano (ITA)	14 June 1998 (age 28)
Gaia Masetti (ITA)	26 October 2001 (age 24)

Rider	Date of birth
Iris Monticolo (ITA)	15 July 2000 (age 25)
Maja Perinović (CRO)	24 September 1999 (age 26)
Debora Silvestri (ITA)	8 May 1998 (age 28)
Laura Tomasi (ITA)	1 July 1999 (age 27)
Giorgia Vettorello (ITA)	6 July 2000 (age 26)

=== Valcar–Travel & Service ===
As of 11 February 2020.

Rider	Date of birth
Elisa Balsamo (ITA)	27 February 1998 (age 28)
Teniel Campbell (TRI)	23 September 1997 (age 28)
Marta Cavalli (ITA)	18 March 1998 (age 28)
Chiara Consonni (ITA)	24 June 1999 (age 27)
Vittoria Guazzini (ITA)	26 December 2000 (age 25)
Silvia Magri (ITA)	17 October 2000 (age 25)
Barbara Malcotti (ITA)	19 February 2000 (age 26)

Rider	Date of birth
Silvia Persico (ITA)	25 July 1997 (age 28)
Federica Piergiovanni (ITA)	30 July 2001 (age 24)
Elena Pirrone (ITA)	21 February 1999 (age 27)
Silvia Pollicini (ITA)	31 December 1998 (age 27)
Ilaria Sanguineti (ITA)	15 April 1994 (age 32)
Miriam Vece (ITA)	16 March 1997 (age 29)

=== VIB–Natural Greatness ===
As of 12 February 2020.

Rider	Date of birth
Maha Abdulbaqi (BHR)	20 December 1989 (age 36)
Hadeer Ahmed (IRQ)	7 July 1989 (age 37)
Amna Alaamer (BHR)	26 June 1982 (age 44)
May Alhaji (BHR)	16 July 1981 (age 44)
Kübra Bektas (TUR)	19 October 1994 (age 31)
Sara Bonillo (ESP)	2 February 2001 (age 25)
Jennifer Ducuara (COL)	31 January 1996 (age 30)
Raquel Gisbert (ESP)	28 May 1991 (age 35)

Rider	Date of birth
Melisa Gómiz (ESP)	8 December 2000 (age 25)
Maha Habib (BHR)	16 June 1984 (age 42)
Pilar Jiménez (ESP)	24 September 2001 (age 24)
Ana Isabel López (ESP)	9 March 2000 (age 26)
Zahrra Mousad (IRQ)	19 September 1991 (age 34)
Jennifer Neenan (IRL)	6 August 1998 (age 27)
Marta Romeu (ESP)	21 May 1992 (age 34)
Somayeh Yazdani (IRN)	6 October 1990 (age 35)

=== WCC Team ===
As of 15 February 2020.

Rider	Date of birth
Roni Fishman (ISR)	15 July 1999 (age 26)
Eyeru Tesfoam Gebru (ETH)	10 December 1996 (age 29)
Akvilė Gedraitytė (LTU)	14 February 2001 (age 25)
Veronika Jandová (CZE)	1 August 2001 (age 24)
Amber Joseph (BAR)	15 December 1999 (age 26)

Rider	Date of birth
Anastasiya Kolesava (BLR)	2 June 2000 (age 26)
Tereza Medveďová (SVK)	27 March 1996 (age 30)
Catalina Soto (CHI)	8 April 2001 (age 25)
Magdeleine Vallieres Mill (CAN)	10 August 2001 (age 24)
