= Toffanin =

Toffanin is a surname. Notable people with the surname include:

- Mario Toffanin (1912–1999), Italian Communist partisan
- Martina Toffanin (born 2000), Italian racing cyclist
- Silvia Toffanin (born 1979), Italian television host, model, and journalist
