= Andrea Fraile =

Spanish cyclist

Personal information
- Full name: Andrea Fraile Mas
- Born: 2 January 1993 (age 33)

Cycling career
- Sport: Cycling
- Discipline: Road
- Role: Rider

Professional teams
- 2012: Bizkaia–Durango
- 2019: Eneicat

Andrea Fraile Mas (born 2 January 1993) is a Spanish professional racing cyclist, who last rode for the UCI Women's Team Eneicat–CMTeam during the 2019 women's road cycling season.
