= Elné Owen =

South African cyclist

Personal information
- Full name: Elné Owen
- Born: 25 July 1999 (age 27)

Cycling career
- Sport: Cycling
- Discipline: Road
- Role: Rider

Professional team
- 2019: Sopela Women's Team

Elné Owen (born 25 July 1999) is a South African professional racing cyclist, who last rode for the UCI Women's Team Sopela Women's Team during the 2019 women's road cycling season.
