= Saioa Gil =

Spanish cyclist (born 2000)

Personal information
- Full name: Saioa Gil Ranero
- Born: 18 February 2000 (age 26)

Cycling career
- Sport: Cycling
- Discipline: Road
- Role: Rider

Amateur team
- 2017–2018: Bioracer–Elmet Benidorm

Professional team
- 2019: Eneicat

Saioa Gil Ranero (born 18 February 2000) is a Spanish professional racing cyclist, who last rode for the UCI Women's Team Eneicat during the 2019 women's road cycling season.
