= Marie Dessart =

Belgian cyclist

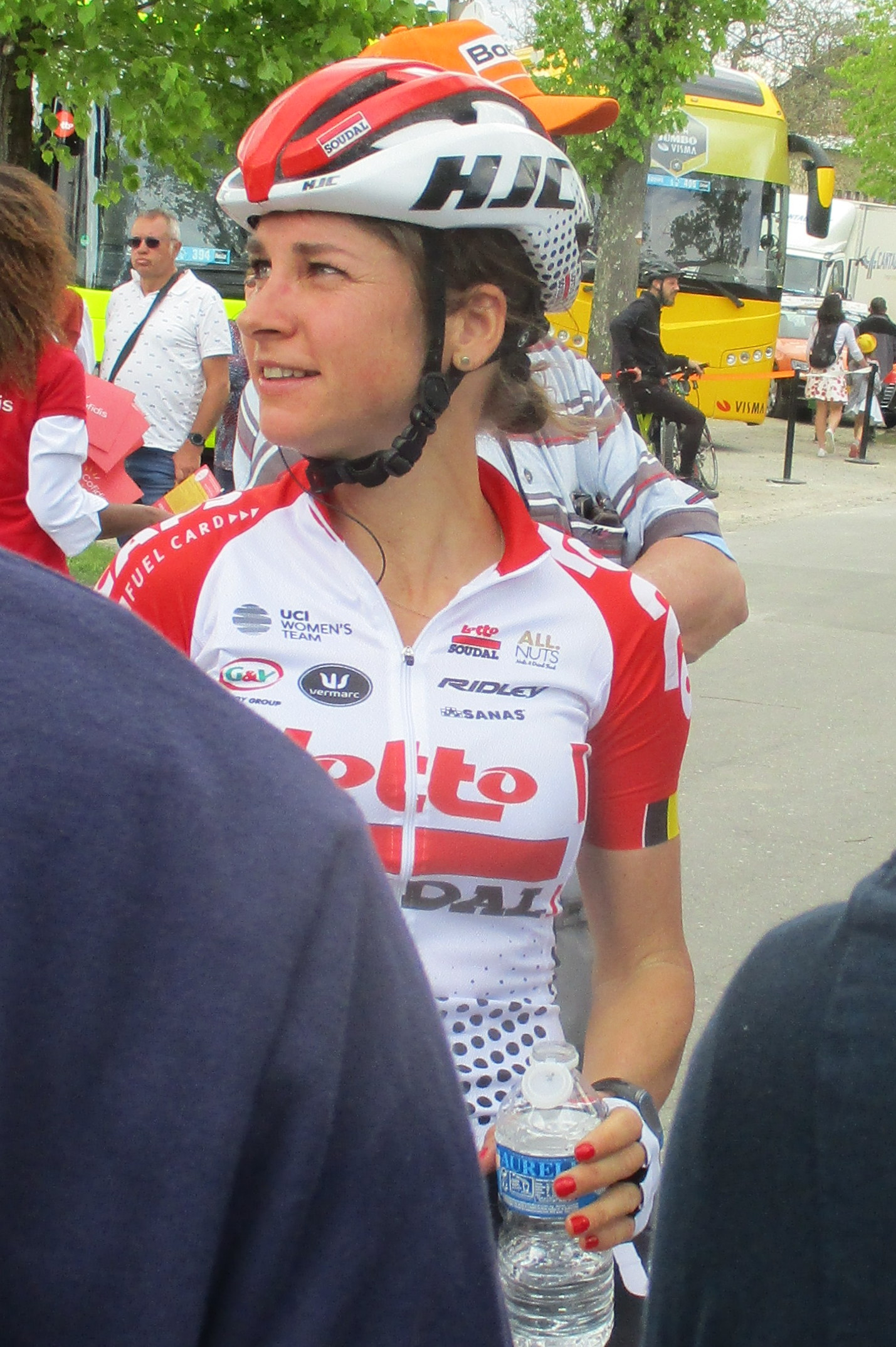
- Dessart in 2019

Personal information
- Full name: Marie Dessart
- Born: 13 December 1980 (age 45)

Cycling career
- Sport: Cycling
- Current team: Retired
- Discipline: Road
- Role: Rider

Professional team
- 2019: Lotto–Soudal Ladies

Marie Dessart (born 13 December 1980) is a Belgian former professional racing cyclist, who rode professionally for UCI Women's Team Lotto–Soudal Ladies during the 2019 women's road cycling season.
