= Cristina Aznar =

Spanish cyclist

Personal information
- Full name: Cristina Aznar Torrés
- Born: 3 August 1990 (age 36)

Cycling career
- Sport: Cycling
- Discipline: Road
- Role: Rider

Amateur team
- 2018: Team Stuttgart

Professional teams
- 2010: Lointek
- 2019: Massi–Tactic

Cristina Aznar Torrés (born 3 August 1990) is a Spanish professional racing cyclist, who last rode for the UCI Women's Team Massi–Tactic during the 2019 women's road cycling season.
