= Sandra Santos =

Portuguese cyclist

Personal information
- Full name: Sandra dos Santos
- Born: 2 June 1992 (age 34)

Cycling career
- Sport: Cycling
- Discipline: Road
- Role: Rider

Professional team
- 2019: Eneicat

Sandra dos Santos (born 2 June 1992) is a Portuguese professional racing cyclist, who last rode for the UCI Women's Team Eneicat during the 2019 women's road cycling season.
