= Gloria Nardi =

Italian cyclist

Personal information
- Full name: Gloria Nardi
- Born: 14 July 2000 (age 26)

Cycling career
- Sport: Cycling
- Discipline: Road
- Role: Rider

Professional team
- 2019: Eurotarget–Bianchi–Vittoria

Gloria Nardi (born 14 July 2000) is an Italian professional racing cyclist, who last rode for the UCI Women's Team Eurotarget–Bianchi–Vittoria during the 2019 women's road cycling season.
