= Sandra Moral =

Spanish cyclist

Personal information
- Full name: Sandra Moral Ventosinos
- Born: 28 November 1991 (age 34)

Cycling career
- Sport: Cycling
- Current team: Team Farto–BTC Women's Cycling Team
- Discipline: Road
- Role: Rider

Amateur teams
- 2018: DC Ride–Vektor
- 2020: Farto–Aguas do Paraño

Professional teams
- 2019: Massi–Tactic
- 2021–: Team Farto–BTC

Sandra Moral Ventosinos (born 28 November 1991) is a Spanish racing cyclist, who currently rides for Spanish UCI Women's Continental Team Team Farto–BTC Women's Cycling Team.
