= Jessica Raimondi =

Italian cyclist

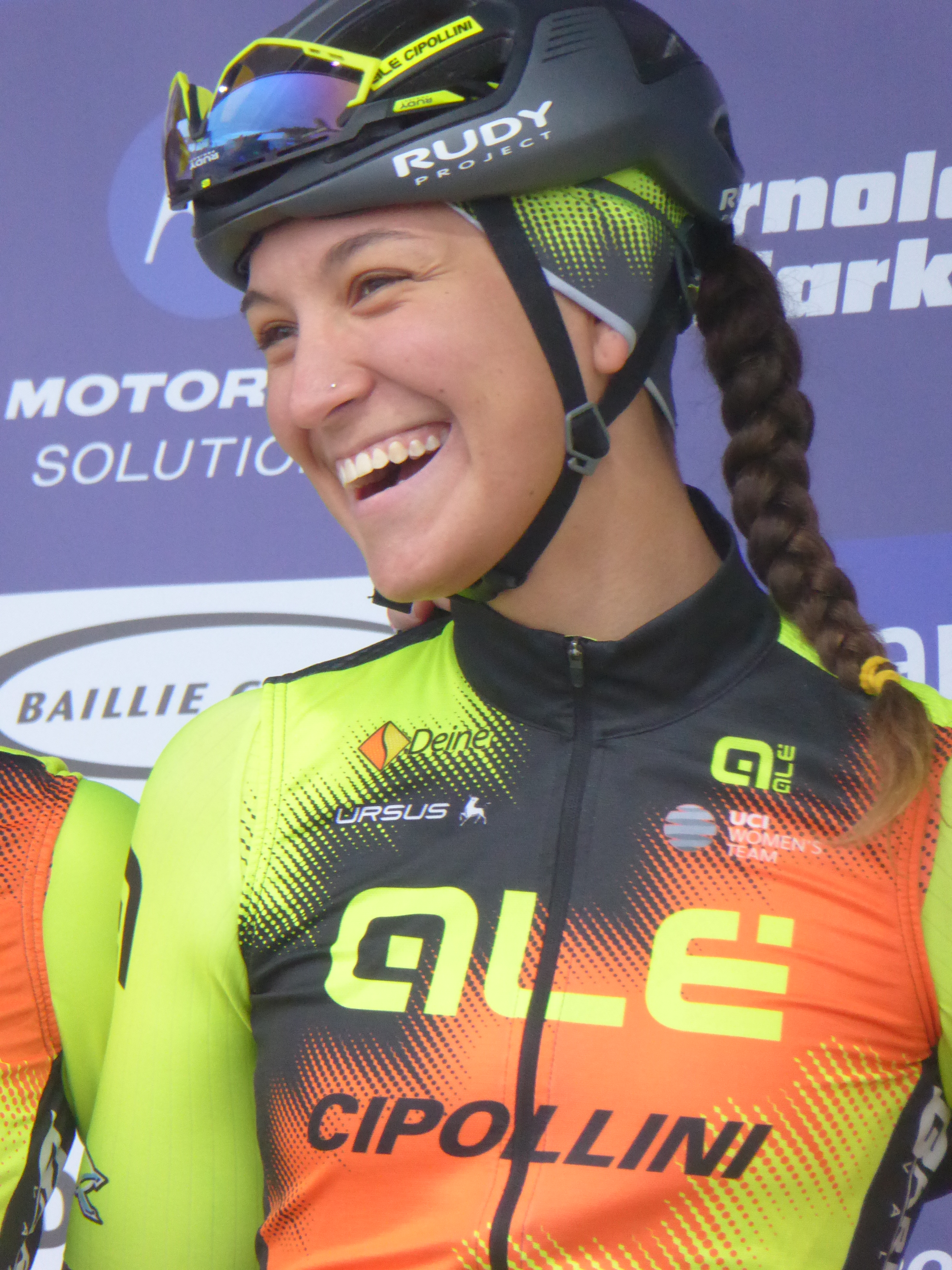
- Raimondi at the 2019 Women's Tour of Scotland

Personal information
- Born: 21 February 1999 (age 27)

Cycling career
- Sport: Cycling
- Current team: Retired
- Discipline: Road
- Role: Rider

Professional team
- 2019: Alé–Cipollini

Jessica Raimondi (born 21 February 1999) is an Italian former professional racing cyclist, who rode professionally for UCI Women's Team Alé–Cipollini in the 2019 women's road cycling season.
