= Julia Casas =

Spanish cyclist

Personal information
- Full name: Julia Casas Codina
- Born: 1 October 1980 (age 46)

Cycling career
- Sport: Cycling
- Discipline: Road
- Role: Rider

Amateur team
- 2018: Probike Club

Professional team
- 2018–2019: Sopela Women's Team

Julia Casas Codina (born 1 October 1980) is a Spanish professional racing cyclist, who last rode for the UCI Women's Team Sopela Women's Team during the 2019 women's road cycling season.
