= Olga Deyko =

Russian cyclist

Personal information
- Full name: Olga Deyko
- Born: 23 December 1995 (age 30)

Cycling career
- Sport: Cycling
- Discipline: Road
- Role: Rider

Professional team
- 2018–2019: Cogeas–Mettler Pro Cycling Team

Olga Deyko (born 23 December 1995) is a Russian professional racing cyclist, who last rode for the UCI Women's Team Cogeas–Mettler–Look during the 2019 women's road cycling season.
