= Enara López =

Spanish cyclist

Personal information
- Full name: Enara López Gallastegui
- Born: 3 July 1997 (age 29)

Cycling career
- Sport: Cycling
- Current team: Team Farto–BTC Women's Cycling Team
- Discipline: Road
- Role: Rider

Amateur teams
- 2016–2017: Bioracer–Elkar Kirolak
- 2020: Casa Dorada Women Cycling

Professional teams
- 2018: Sopela Women's Team
- 2018–2019: Bizkaia Durango–Euskadi Murias
- 2020: Cronos–Casa Dorada
- 2021–: Team Farto–BTC

Enara López Gallastegui (born 3 July 1997) is a Spanish racing cyclist, who currently rides for UCI Women's Continental Team Team Farto–BTC Women's Cycling Team.
