= Anna Pujol =

Spanish cyclist (born 1990)

Personal information
- Full name: Anna Pujol Muñoz
- Born: 29 October 1990 (age 35)

Cycling career
- Sport: Cycling
- Current team: Team Farto–BTC Women's Cycling Team
- Discipline: Road
- Role: Rider

Amateur teams
- 2018: DC Ride–Vektor
- 2020: Farto–Aguas do Paraño

Professional teams
- 2017: Bizkaia–Durango
- 2019: Eneicat
- 2021–: Team Farto–BTC

Anna Cristina Pujol Muñoz (born 29 October 1990) is a Spanish professional racing cyclist, who currently rides for Spanish UCI Women's Continental Team Team Farto–BTC Women's Cycling Team.
