= Lu Mei =

Chinese professional racing cyclist

Personal information
- Full name: Lu Mei
- Born: 16 April 1997 (age 29)

Cycling career
- Sport: Cycling
- Discipline: Road
- Role: Rider

Professional team
- 2018–2019: China Chongming–Liv

Lu Mei (born 16 April 1997) is a Chinese professional racing cyclist. She last rode for the UCI Women's Team China Liv Pro Cycling during the 2019 women's road cycling season.
