= Esther Meisels =

Israeli cyclist (born 1995)

Esther Meisels אסתר מייזלס
Personal information
- Full name: Esther Meisels
- Born: 10 June 1995 (age 31)

Cycling career
- Sport: Cycling
- Discipline: Road
- Role: Rider

Professional team
- 2019: Health Mate–Cyclelive Team

Esther Meisels (Hebrew: אסתר מייזלס; born 10 June 1995) is an Israeli professional racing cyclist, who most recently rode for UCI Women's Team Health Mate–Cyclelive Team. Meisels had signed for the team for the 2019 women's road cycling season, but left the team during the season due to "abusive treatment and inappropriate behaviour".
