= Ariadna Nevado =

Spanish cyclist (born 2000)

Personal information
- Full name: Ariadna Nevado Gimeno
- Born: 26 September 2000 (age 26)

Cycling career
- Sport: Cycling
- Discipline: Road
- Role: Rider

Professional team
- 2019: Sopela Women's Team

Ariadna Nevado Gimeno (born 26 September 2000) is a Spanish professional racing cyclist, who last rode for the UCI Women's Team Sopela Women's Team, during the 2019 women's road cycling season.
