= Basma El Ghouate =

French agent, stylist, and former cyclist

Personal information
- Born: 21 March 2002 (age 24) France

Cycling career
- Sport: Cycling
- Discipline: Road cycling

Professional team
- 2020: Macogep Tornatech Girondins de Bordeaux

Basma El Ghouate (born 21 March 2002) is a French former professional racing cyclist, who most recently rode for Macogep Tornatech Girondins de Bordeaux. She has also worked as a fashion photographer and stylist.
