= Lucie Lahaye =

French cyclist

Personal information
- Full name: Lucie Lahaye
- Born: 21 November 1997 (age 28)

Cycling career
- Sport: Cycling
- Discipline: Road
- Role: Rider
- Rider type: Climber

Amateur team
- 2017–2018: DN 17 Nouvelle Aquitaine

Professional team
- 2019–2020: Charente-Maritime Women Cycling

Lucie Lahaye (born 21 November 1997) is a French professional racing cyclist who most recently rode for UCI Women's Continental Team Charente-Maritime Women Cycling. Lahaye had been a member of the team from 2017, including its first UCI season in 2019.
