= Martina Toffanin =

Italian cyclist

Personal information
- Full name: Martina Toffanin
- Born: 23 June 2000 (age 26)

Cycling career
- Sport: Cycling
- Discipline: Road
- Role: Rider

Professional team
- 2019: Top Girls Fassa Bortolo

Martina Toffanin (born 23 June 2000) is an Italian professional racing cyclist, who last rode for the UCI Women's Team Top Girls Fassa Bortolo during the 2019 women's road cycling season.
