= Cathalijne Hoolwerf =

Dutch cyclist

Personal information
- Born: 26 February 2000 (age 26)

Cycling career
- Sport: Cycling
- Current team: AG Insurance–Soudal
- Discipline: Road
- Role: Rider

Amateur teams
- 2017: NWV Groningen
- 2018–2019: CC Pavé 76–APB Women Development Team
- 2022: WV Schijndel

Professional team
- 2020–2021: NXTG Racing

Cathalijne Hoolwerf (born 26 February 2000) is a former Dutch professional racing cyclist, who last rode for amateur team WV Schijndel. In October 2020, she rode in the 2020 Three Days of Bruges–De Panne race in Belgium.
