= Manon Minaud =

French cyclist

Personal information
- Full name: Manon Minaud
- Born: 21 October 1998 (age 27)

Cycling career
- Sport: Cycling
- Current team: Team Groupama Elles Pays de la Loire
- Discipline: Road
- Role: Rider
- Rider type: Puncheur

Amateur teams
- 2017–2018: Team Elles Pays de la Loire
- 2021–: Team Groupama Elles Pays de la Loire

Professional team
- 2019–2020: Charente-Maritime Women Cycling

Manon Minaud (born 21 October 1998) is a French racing cyclist who rides for the French amateur team Groupama Elles Pays de la Loire. She previously competed with the team in 2017 and 2018 and also rode professionally for Charente-Maritime Women Cycling in 2019, and 2020.
