= Silje Mathisen =

Norwegian cyclist (born 2001)

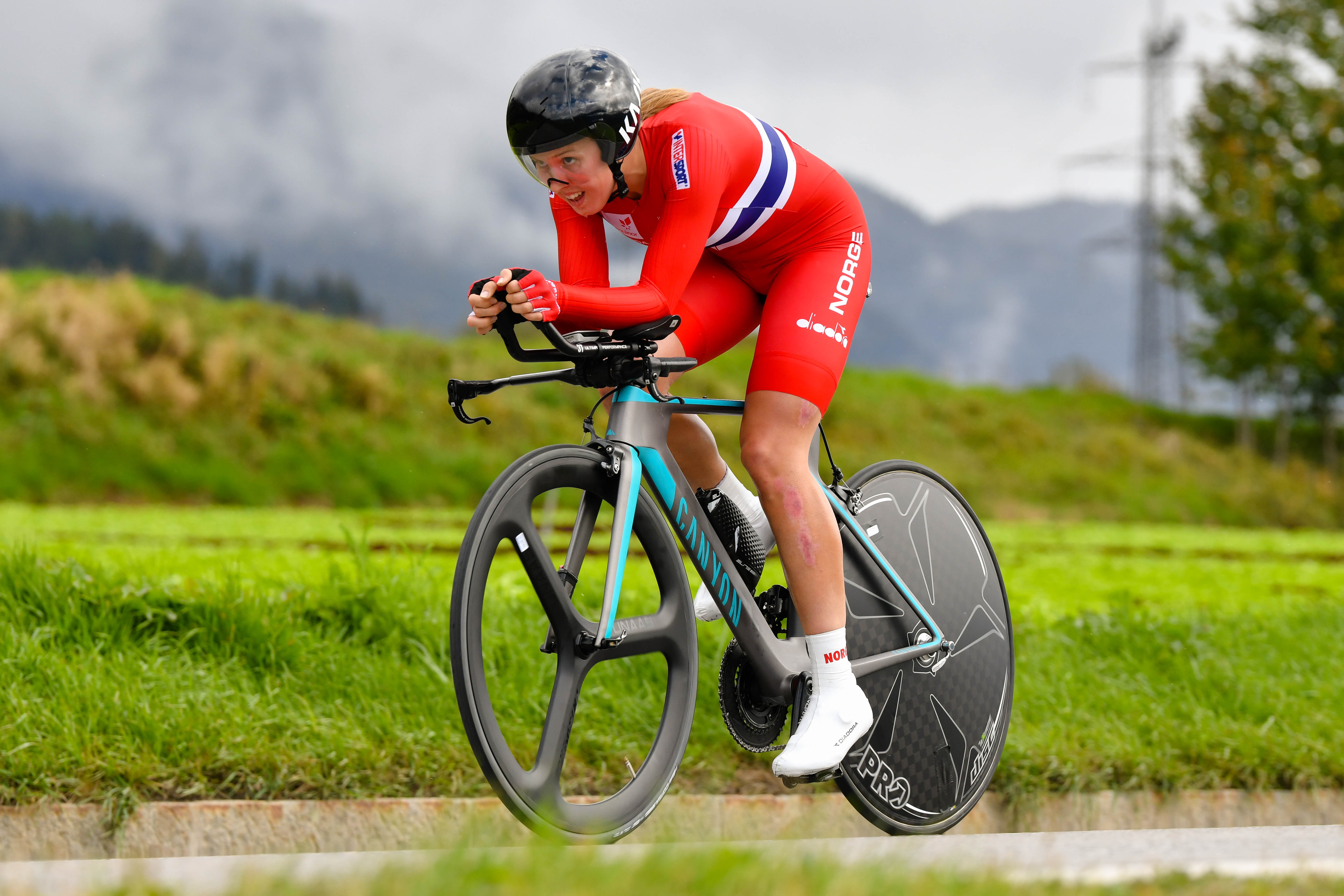

Personal information
- Born: 15 February 2001 (age 25)

Cycling career
- Sport: Cycling
- Current team: Retired
- Discipline: Road
- Role: Rider

Amateur team
- 2018–2019: Halden CK

Professional team
- 2020–2021: Hitec Products–Birk Sport

Silje Mathisen (born 15 February 2001) is a Norwegian former professional racing cyclist, who rode professionally for UCI Women's Continental Team Team Coop–Hitec Products in 2020 and 2021. In October 2020, she rode in the 2020 Tour of Flanders for Women's race in Belgium.

== Major results ==
2018
1st Road Race, National Junior Road Championships
1st Time trial, National Junior Road Championships
2019
1st Stage 6 Rás na mBan
2nd Time trial, National Junior Road Championships
