= Marine Quiniou =

French cyclist (born 1993)

Personal information
- Full name: Marine Quiniou
- Born: 26 August 1993 (age 33)

Cycling career
- Sport: Cycling
- Discipline: Road
- Role: Rider

Amateur team
- 2017–2018: Breizh Ladies

Professional team
- 2019–2020: Charente-Maritime Women Cycling

Marine Quiniou (born 26 August 1993) is a French professional racing cyclist, who most recently rode for UCI Women's Continental Team Charente-Maritime Women Cycling. Quiniou signed with Charente-Maritime Women Cycling for the 2019 women's road cycling season, after two years with the amateur Breizh Ladies team.
