= China Scenic Avenue =

Road bicycle race in China

Race details
- Date: September
- Region: China
- Discipline: Road

History
- First edition: 2019
- Editions: 1 (as of 2019)
- First winner: Race 1: Jiajun Sun (CHN); Race 2: Jiajun Sun (CHN)
- Most recent: Race 1: Jiajun Sun (CHN); Race 2: Jiajun Sun (CHN)

China Scenic Avenue is an elite series of women's professional one-day road bicycle race held in China and each are currently rated by the UCI as a 1.2 race.

== Past winners ==
=== China Scenic Avenue I ===
Year	Country	Rider	Team
2019	China	Jiajun Sun	
2020			

=== China Scenic Avenue II ===
Year	Country	Rider	Team
2019	China	Jiajun Sun	
2020			
