= Teresa Ripoll Sabate =

Spanish cyclist

Teresa Ripoll
Personal information
- Full name: Teresa Ripoll Sabate
- Born: 3 February 1997 (age 29) Ontinyent, Spain

Cycling career
- Sport: Cycling
- Current team: Team Farto–BTC Women's Cycling Team
- Discipline: Road
- Role: Rider

Amateur team
- 2017–2018: Hyundai Koryo Car

Professional teams
- 2016: Lointek
- 2019–2020: Massi–Tactic
- 2021–: Team Farto–BTC

Teresa Ripoll Sabate (born 3 February 1997) is a Spanish professional racing cyclist, who currently rides for UCI Women's Continental Team Team Farto–BTC Women's Cycling Team.

== See also ==
- List of 2016 UCI Women's Teams and riders
