= Jennifer Luebke =

American cyclist (born 1986)

Personal information
- Born: April 1, 1986 (age 40)

Cycling career
- Sport: Cycling
- Role: Rider

Jennifer Luebke (born April 1, 1986) is an American professional racing cyclist. She signed to ride for the UCI Women's Team Virginia's Blue Ridge–Twenty28 for the 2019 women's road cycling season.
