= Charmaine Porter =

British cyclist (born 1995)

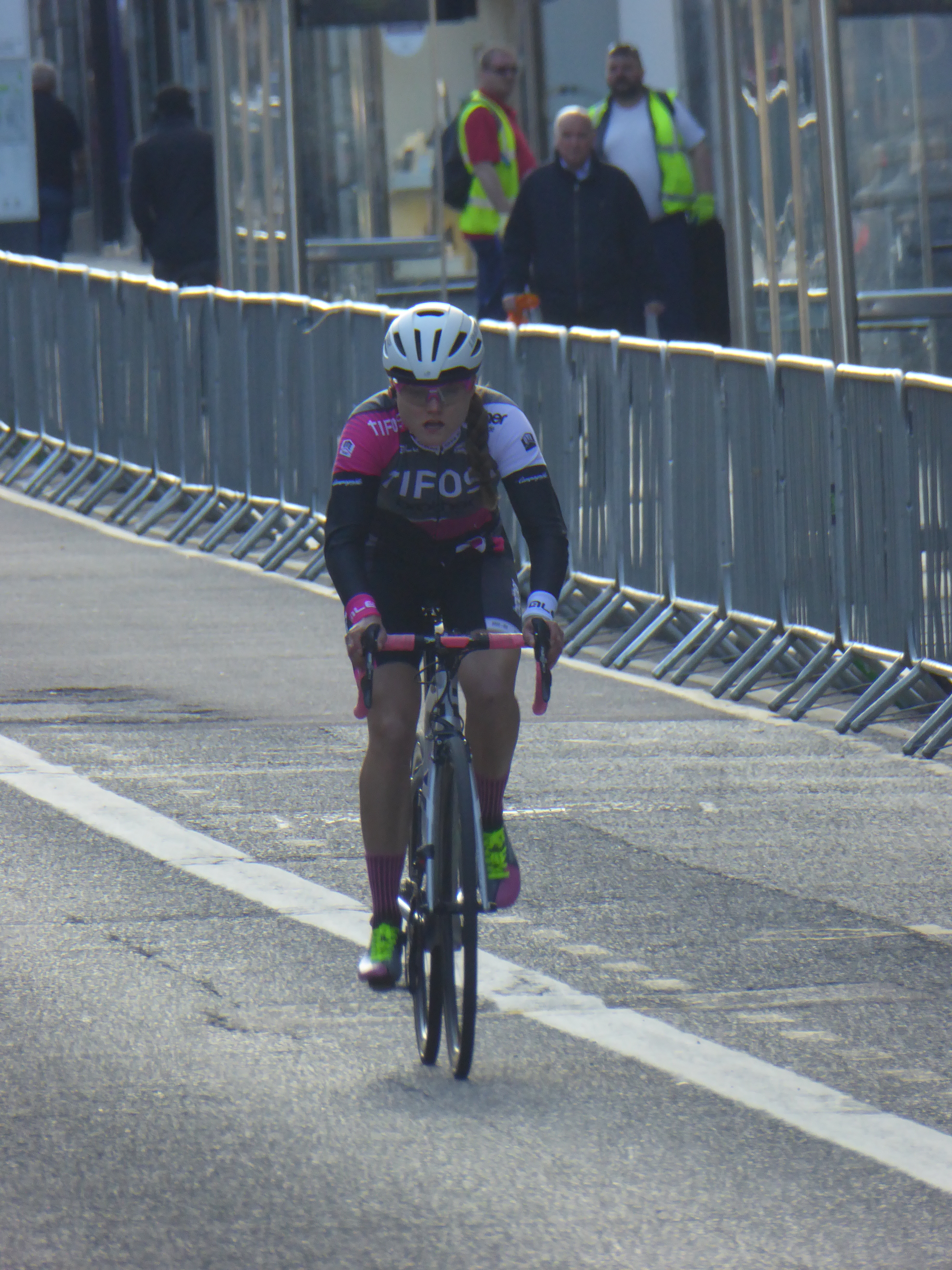
- Porter in 2019

Personal information
- Full name: Charmaine Porter
- Born: 26 June 1995 (age 31)

Cycling career
- Sport: Cycling
- Current team: Retired
- Discipline: Road
- Role: Rider

Amateur teams
- 2015–2016: Army Cycling Union
- 2017: Team Ford EcoBoost
- 2017–2019: Team OnForm

Professional team
- 2020: CAMS–Tifosi

Charmaine Porter (born 26 June 1995) is a British former professional racing cyclist, who was part of UCI Women's Continental Team CAMS–Tifosi, during the COVID-19 pandemic-disrupted 2020 season. Throughout the majority of her cycling career, Porter combined cycling with a career in the British Army, reaching a rank of lance corporal.

Porter retired from cycling at the end of the 2020 season.
