= Amy Monkhouse (cyclist) =

British cyclist

Personal information
- Full name: Amy Victoria Monkhouse
- Born: 6 May 2001 (age 25)

Cycling career
- Sport: Cycling
- Current team: Watersley Race & Development Team
- Discipline: Road
- Role: Rider

Amateur teams
- 2017–2018: Jadan–Weldtite p/b Vive Le Velo
- 2019: Storey Racing
- 2021–: Watersley Race & Development Team

Professional team
- 2020: Bizkaia–Durango

Amy Victoria Monkhouse (born 6 May 2001) is a British racing cyclist, who currently rides for Dutch amateur team Watersley Race & Development Team.
