= Basei Marzia Salton =

Italian cyclist

Personal information
- Born: 7 July 1997 (age 29)

Cycling career
- Sport: Cycling
- Role: Rider

Basei Marzia Salton (born 7 July 1997) is an Italian professional racing cyclist. She signed to ride for the UCI Women's Team Pro Cycling Team Fanini for the 2019 women's road cycling season.
