= Irene Loizate =

Spanish cyclist

Personal information
- Full name: Irene Loizate Sarrionandia
- Born: 17 May 1995 (age 31)

Cycling career
- Sport: Cycling
- Discipline: Road
- Role: Rider

Professional team
- 2019–2023: Bizkaia–Durango

Irene Loizate Sarrionandia (born 17 May 1995) is a Spanish professional racing cyclist and duathlete, who rode for UCI Women's Continental Team Bizkaia–Durango.
