= Paula Sanmartín =

Spanish cyclist

Personal information
- Full name: Paula Sanmartín Rodríguez
- Born: 16 May 1997 (age 29)

Cycling career
- Sport: Cycling
- Current team: Retired
- Discipline: Road
- Role: Rider

Professional teams
- 2018: Servetto–Stradalli Cycle–Alurecycling
- 2019: Eneicat
- 2020: Bizkaia–Durango

Paula Sanmartín Rodríguez (born 16 May 1997) is a Spanish former professional racing cyclist, who rode professionally between 2018 and 2020, for the Servetto–Stradalli Cycle–Alurecycling, Eneicat and Bizkaia–Durango teams.
