= Noemí Ferré =

Spanish cyclist

Personal information
- Full name: Noemí Ferré Fernández
- Born: 24 November 1991 (age 34)

Cycling career
- Sport: Cycling
- Discipline: Road
- Role: Rider

Professional team
- 2019–2020: Massi–Tactic

Noemí Ferré Fernández (born 24 November 1991) is a Spanish professional racing cyclist, who most recently rode for UCI Women's Continental Team Massi–Tactic.

She is married to fellow professional cyclist Sepp Kuss.
