= Chloë Turblin =

French cyclist

Personal information
- Full name: Chloë Turblin
- Born: 19 September 1995 (age 31)

Cycling career
- Sport: Cycling
- Current team: Velcan Racing Team
- Disciplines: Road; Mountain biking
- Role: Rider

Amateur teams
- 2019: Multum Accountants Ladies
- 2021–: Velcan Racing Team

Professional teams
- 2018–2019: Health Mate–Cyclelive Team
- 2020: Massi–Tactic

Chloë Turblin (born 19 September 1995) is a French professional racing cyclist, who currently rides for French amateur team Velcan Racing Team.
