= Alexandra Moreno =

Spanish cyclist (born 2000)

Personal information
- Full name: Alexandra Moreno Roca
- Born: 25 January 2000 (age 26)

Cycling career
- Sport: Cycling
- Discipline: Road
- Role: Rider

Amateur team
- 2018: CAF Turnkey Engineering

Professional team
- 2019–2020: Sopela Women's Team

Alexandra Moreno Roca (born 25 January 2000) is a Spanish professional racing cyclist, who last rode for UCI Women's Continental Team Sopela Women's Team.
