= Andere Basterra =

Spanish cyclist (born 2000)

Personal information
- Full name: Andere Basterra Aspe
- Born: 5 October 2000 (age 26)

Cycling career
- Sport: Cycling
- Discipline: Road
- Role: Rider

Amateur team
- 2018: CAF Turnkey Engineering

Professional team
- 2019–2020: Sopela Women's Team

Andere Basterra Aspe (born 5 October 2000) is a Spanish professional racing cyclist, who most recently rode for UCI Women's Continental Team Sopela Women's Team.
