= Kanyarat Gatethonglang =

Thai cyclist

Personal information
- Full name: Kanyarat Gatethonglang
- Born: 6 October 1999 (age 27)

Cycling career
- Sport: Cycling
- Discipline: Road
- Role: Rider

Professional team
- 2019–2020: Thailand Women's Cycling Team

Kanyarat Gatethonglang (born 6 October 1999) is a Thai professional racing cyclist, who most recently rode for UCI Women's Continental Team Thailand Women's Cycling Team.
