= Sofía Barriguete =

Spanish cyclist (born 2000)

Personal information
- Full name: Sofía Barriguete Rodríguez
- Born: 5 July 2000 (age 26)

Cycling career
- Sport: Cycling
- Discipline: Road
- Role: Rider

Professional teams
- 2019: Massi–Tactic
- 2020: Río Miera–Cantabria Deporte

Sofía Barriguete Rodríguez (born 5 July 2000) is a Spanish professional racing cyclist, who most recently rode for UCI Women's Continental Team Río Miera–Cantabria Deporte.
