= Emilia Matteoli =

Italian racing cyclist

Personal information
- Born: 12 November 1999 (age 26)

Cycling career
- Sport: Cycling
- Discipline: Road
- Role: Rider

Amateur teams
- 2017: MX Vaiano DSK Sietynas
- 2017: Aromitalia Vaiano (stagiaire)

Professional team
- 2018–2020: Aromitalia Vaiano

Emilia Matteoli (born 12 November 1999) is an Italian professional racing cyclist, who most recently rode for UCI Women's Continental Team Aromitalia–Basso Bikes–Vaiano.
