= Marina Isan Berga =

Spanish cyclist

Personal information
- Full name: Marina Isan Berga
- Born: 12 April 1994 (age 32)

Cycling career
- Sport: Cycling
- Discipline: Road
- Role: Rider

Amateur team
- 2018: Catema.cat

Professional team
- 2019–2020: Massi–Tactic

Marina Isan Berga (born 12 April 1994) is a Spanish professional racing cyclist, who most recently rode for UCI Women's Continental Team Massi–Tactic.
