= Mireia Muñoz =

Spanish cyclist

Personal information
- Full name: Mireia Muñoz Pérez
- Born: 24 December 1998 (age 27)

Cycling career
- Sport: Cycling
- Discipline: Road
- Role: Rider

Professional team
- 2018–2020: Sopela Women's Team

Mireia Muñoz Pérez (born 24 December 1998) is a Spanish professional racing cyclist, who most recently rode for UCI Women's Continental Team Sopela Women's Team.
