= Margot Clyne =

American cyclist

Personal information
- Full name: Margot Clyne
- Born: February 27, 1995 (age 31)

Cycling career
- Sport: Cycling
- Current team: DNA Pro Cycling
- Discipline: Road
- Role: Rider

Professional teams
- 2018–2019: Twenty20 p/b Sho-Air
- 2020–: DNA Pro Cycling

Margot Clyne (born February 27, 1995) is an American professional racing cyclist, who is the record holder for Pikes Peak HC. She currently rides for UCI Women's Continental Team DNA Pro Cycling.
