= Marissa Baks =

Dutch cyclist

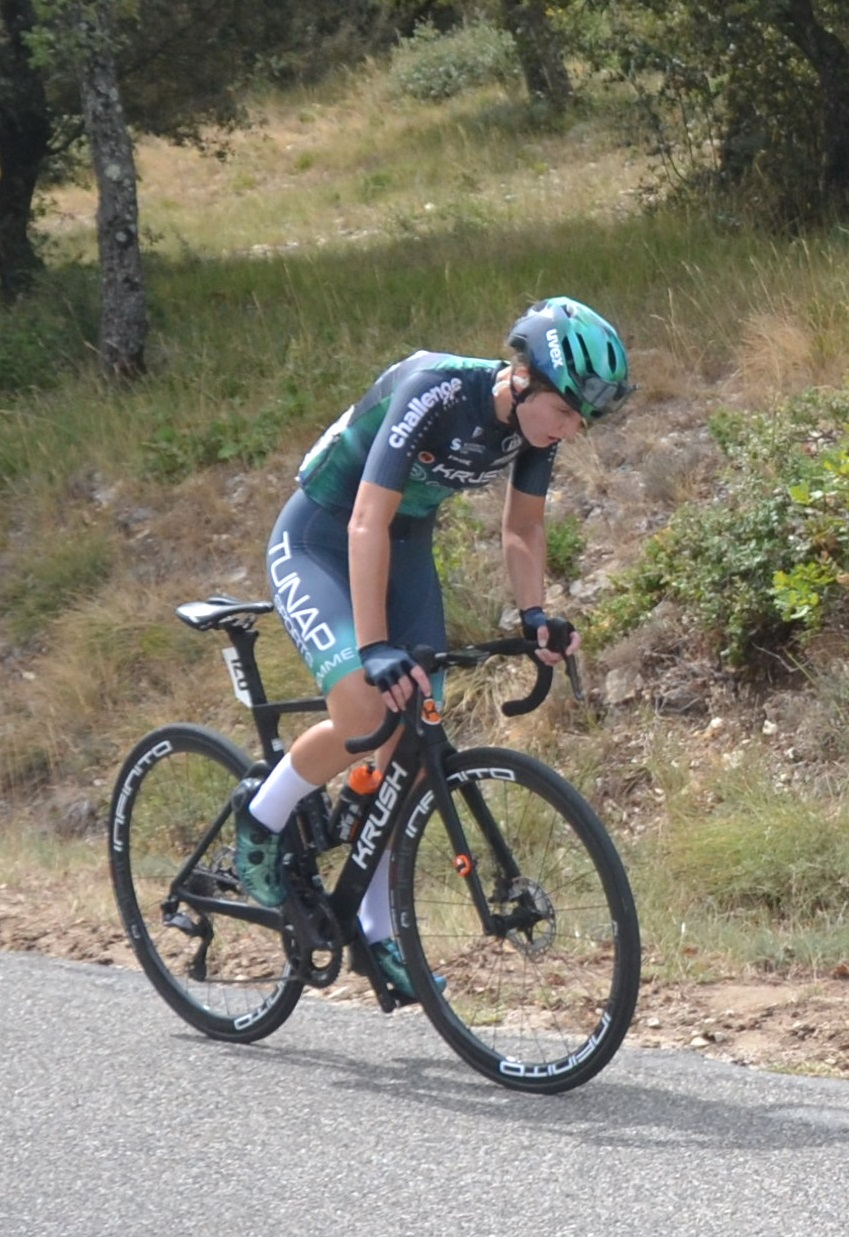
- Marissa Baks

Personal information
- Full name: Marissa Baks
- Born: 5 December 1998 (age 27)

Cycling career
- Sport: Cycling
- Discipline: Road
- Role: Rider

Professional team
- 2019–2024: Biehler Pro Cycling

Marissa Baks (born 5 December 1998) is a Dutch professional racing cyclist, who rode for UCI Women's Continental Team GT Krush Rebellease.
