= Elisa Dalla Valle =

Italian cyclist

Personal information
- Full name: Elisa Dalla Valle
- Born: 16 January 1998 (age 28)

Cycling career
- Sport: Cycling
- Current team: Top Girls Fassa Bortolo
- Discipline: Road
- Role: Rider

Professional teams
- 2017–2018: S.C. Michela Fanini Rox
- 2019–: Top Girls Fassa Bortolo

Elisa Dalla Valle (born 16 January 1998) is an Italian professional racing cyclist, who currently rides for UCI Women's Continental Team Top Girls Fassa Bortolo.
