= Chiara Perini =

Italian racing cyclist

Personal information
- Full name: Chiara Perini
- Born: 9 December 1997 (age 28)

Cycling career
- Sport: Cycling
- Current team: Vini Fantini–BePink
- Discipline: Road
- Role: Rider

Professional teams
- 2017: Giusfredi–Bianchi
- 2018: Top Girls Fassa Bortolo
- 2019–: Bepink

Chiara Perini (born 9 December 1997) is an Italian professional racing cyclist, who currently rides for UCI Women's Continental Team Vini Fantini–BePink.
