= Melanie Klement =

Dutch cyclist (born 1994)

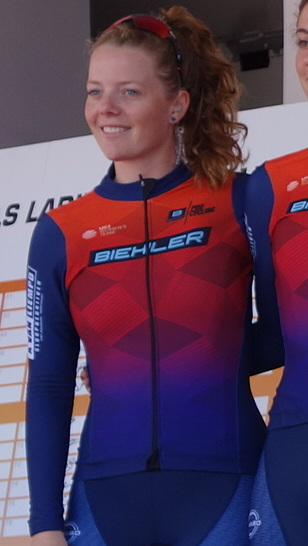
- Klement at the 2019 Holland Ladies Tour

Personal information
- Full name: Melanie Klement
- Born: 3 May 1994 (age 32)

Cycling career
- Sport: Cycling
- Discipline: Road
- Role: Rider

Professional team
- 2019–2022: Biehler Pro Cycling

Melanie Klement (born 3 May 1994) is a Dutch professional racing cyclist, who rode for UCI Women's Continental Team GT Krush Tunap.

== Major results ==
2017
8th Omloop van Borsele
