= Merel Hofman =

Dutch cyclist (born 1998)

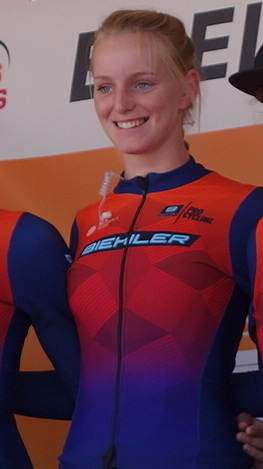
- Hofman at the 2019 Holland Ladies Tour

Personal information
- Full name: Merel Hofman
- Born: 4 January 1998 (age 28)

Cycling career
- Sport: Cycling
- Discipline: Road
- Role: Rider

Amateur teams
- 2017: Restore Cycling Team
- 2018: Swaboladies.nl

Professional team
- 2019–2020: Biehler Pro Cycling

Merel Hofman (born 4 January 1998) is a Dutch professional racing cyclist, who most recently rode for UCI Women's Continental Team Biehler Krush Pro Cycling.
