= Sarocha Kamonkhon =

Thai cyclist

Personal information
- Full name: Sarocha Kamonkhon
- Born: 15 August 1997 (age 29)

Cycling career
- Sport: Cycling
- Current team: Thailand Women's Cycling Team
- Discipline: Road
- Role: Rider

Professional team
- 2017–: Thailand Women's Cycling Team

Sarocha Kamonkhon (born 15 August 1997) is a Thai professional racing cyclist, who currently rides for UCI Women's Continental Team Thailand Women's Cycling Team.
