= Amaia Malatsetxebarria =

Spanish cyclist (born 2000)

Personal information
- Full name: Amaia Malatsetxebarria Ibaibarriaga
- Born: 9 December 2000 (age 25)

Cycling career
- Sport: Cycling
- Discipline: Road
- Role: Rider

Professional team
- 2019–2020: Sopela Women's Team

Amaia Malatsetxebarria Ibaibarriaga (born 9 December 2000) is a Spanish professional racing cyclist, who most recently rode for UCI Women's Continental Team Sopela Women's Team.
