= Aroa Gorostiza =

Spanish cyclist

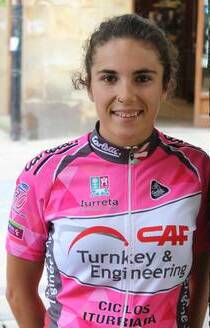

Personal information
- Full name: Aroa Nicole Gorostiza Ulloa
- Born: 7 May 1999 (age 27)

Cycling career
- Sport: Cycling
- Discipline: Road
- Role: Rider

Professional team
- 2018–2020: Bizkaia Durango–Euskadi Murias

Aroa Nicole Gorostiza Ulloa (born 7 May 1999) is a Spanish professional racing cyclist, who most recently rode for UCI Women's Continental Team Bizkaia–Durango.
