= Team Farto–BTC =

Spanish cycling team

Team information
- UCI code: FRT (2018–2020); FAR (2021–)
- Registered: Spain
- Founded: 2018
- Discipline: Road
- Status: National team (2018–2020); UCI Women's Continental Team (2021–)

Team name history
- 2018 2019 2020 2021–: Farto; Farto–Aleata; Farto–Aguas do Paraño; Team Farto–BTC

Team Farto–BTC is a Spanish women's road bicycle racing team, established in 2018, which participates in elite women's races.

== Major results ==
2022
La Classique Morbihan, Antri Christoforou
Overall GP Charlevoix, Marie-Soleil Blais

Stages 3 & 4, Marie-Soleil Blais

2023
Stage 2 Tour Cycliste Féminin International de l'Ardèche, Michaela Drummond

== National Champions ==
2018
Venezuela Time Trial, Katiuska Garcia
Venezuela Road Race, Katiuska Garcia

2019
Venezuela Road Race, Maria Andreina Daza

2020
Portugal Road Race, Melissa Maia
Portugal Hill Climb, Melissa Maia

2021
Portugal Hill Climb, Melissa Maia
