= 2019 in women's road cycling =

2019 in women's road cycling is about the 2019 women's bicycle races ruled by the UCI and the 2019 UCI Women's Teams.

== Single day races (1.1 and 1.2) ==
Race	Date	Cat. †	Winner	Second	Third
(New Zealand) Gravel and Tar La Femme	January 19	1.2	Brodie Chapman (AUS)	Jenna Merrick (NZL)	Rylee Mcmullen (NZL)
(Australia) Cadel Evans Great Ocean Road Race	January 26	1.1	Arlenis Sierra (CUB)	Lucy Kennedy (AUS)	Amanda Spratt (AUS)
(Turkey) Grand Prix Gazipasa	February 9	1.2	Ina Savenka (BLR)	Mariia Novolodskaia (RUS)	Mariia Miliaeva (RUS)
(Turkey) Grand Prix Alanya	February 10	1.2	Tatsiana Sharakova (BLR)	Olga Shekel (UKR)	Mariia Novolodskaia (RUS)
(Spain) Vuelta a la Comunitat Valenciana Feminas	February 10	1.2	Lotte Kopecky (BEL)	Alice Barnes (GBR)	Thị Thật Nguyễn (VIE)
(Israel) Scorpions' Pass Time Trial	March 1	1.2	Antri Christoforou (CYP)	Omer Shapira (ISR)	Rotem Gafinovitz (ISR)
(Belgium) Omloop Het Nieuwsblad	March 2	1.1	Chantal Blaak (NED)	Marta Bastianelli (ITA)	Jip Van Den Bos (NED)
(Israel) Tour of Arava	March 2	1.2	Rotem Gafinovitz (ISR)	Naima Madlen Diesner (GER)	Antri Christoforou (CYP)
(Belgium) Omloop van het Hageland	March 3	1.1	Marta Bastianelli (ITA)	Lotta Lepistö (FIN)	Leah Kirchmann (CAN)
(Belgium) Le Samyn des Dames	March 5	1.2	Jip Van Den Bos (NED)	Daniela Gass (GER)	Demi de Jong (NED)
(Turkey) Grand Prix Velo Alanya	March 9	1.2	Olena Sharga (UKR)	Christina Perchtold (AUT)	Taisa Naskovich (BLR)
(Belgium) Omloop van de Westhoek	March 10	1.2	Cancelled due to severe weather conditions		
(Turkey) Grand Prix Justiniano Hotels	March 10	1.2	Tatsiana Sharakova (BLR)	Mariia Miliaeva (RUS)	Maryna Ivanyuk (UKR)
(Netherlands) Acht van Westerveld	March 15	1.2	Audrey Cordon-Ragot (FRA)	Amy Pieters (NED)	Marta Bastianelli (ITA)
(Belgium) Nokere Koerse voor Dames	March 20	1.2	Lorena Wiebes (NED)	Lisa Klein (GER)	Lotte Kopecky (BEL)
(Cyprus) Aphrodite Cycling Race Individual Time Trial	March 29	1.2	Olga Zabelinskaya (UZB)	Antri Christoforou (CYP)	Omer Shapira (ISR)
(Cyprus) Aphrodite's Sanctuary Cycling Race	March 30	1.2	Olga Zabelinskaya (UZB)	Antri Christoforou (CYP)	Yelyzaveta Oshurkova (RUS)
(Belgium) Dwars door Vlaanderen	April 3	1.1	Ellen van Dijk (NED)	Marta Bastianelli (ITA)	Lucinda Brand (NED)
(Belgium) Grand Prix de Dottignies	April 8	1.2	Cancelled because of safety conditions		
(Belgium) Brabantse Pijl	April 17	1.1	Sofie De Vuyst (BEL)	Marta Cavalli (ITA)	Coryn Rivera (USA)
(Netherlands) EPZ Omloop van Borsele	April 27	1.1	Lorena Wiebes (NED)	Elisa Balsamo (ITA)	Natalie van Gogh (NED)
(Belgium) Trofee Maarten Wynants	May 12	1.1	Elisa Balsamo (ITA)	Laura Tomasi (ITA)	Marjolein van 't Geloof (NED)
(Hungary) V4 Ladies Series – Pannonhalma	May 12	1.2	Polina Kirillova (RUS)	Jarmila Machačová (CZ)	Monika Brzeźna (POL)
(China) Tour of Zhoushan Island I	May 21	1.2	Thị Thật Nguyễn (VIE)	Arianna Fidanza (ITA)	Lisa Morzenti (ITA)
(Ukraine) Chabany Race	May 23	1.2	Olga Shekel (UKR)	Olena Sharga (UKR)	Ana Paula Polegatch (BRA)
(Ukraine) Kyiv Olympic Ring Women Race	May 24	1.2	Hanna Tserah (BLR)	Maryna Ivanyuk (UKR)	Oxana Kliachina (UKR)
(Ukraine) Kyivska Sotka Women Challenge	May 25	1.2	Katarzyna Wilkos (POL)	Ina Savenka (BLR)	Hanna Tserah (BLR)
(Switzerland) SwissEver GP Cham-Hagendorn	May 26	1.2	Julie Leth (DEN)	Lizzy Banks (UK)	Kathrin Schweinberger (AUS)
(Thailand) The 60th Anniversary "Thai Cycling Association" – The Golden Era Celebration	May 26	1.1	Jutatip Maneephan (THA)	Yumi Kajihara (JPN)	Seon Ha Yu (KOR)
(China) Tour of Taiyuan International Women's Road Cycling Race	May 26	1.2	Arianna Fidanza (ITA)	Lisa Morzenti (ITA)	Wing Lee Yeung (HKG)
(France) La Classique Morbihan	May 31	1.1	Christine Majerus (LUX)	Sofie De Vuyst (BEL)	Tatiana Guderzo (ITA)
(France) Grand Prix de Plumelec-Morbihan Dames	June 1	1.1	Cecilie Uttrup Ludwig (DEN)	Mavi García (ESP)	Sheyla Gutiérrez (ESP)
(Canada) Grand Prix Cycliste de Gatineau	June 6	1.1	Leah Kirchmann (CAN)	Allison Beveridge (CAN)	Krista Doebel-Hickock (USA)
(Canada) Chrono Gatineau	June 7	1.1	Amber Neben (USA)	Leah Kirchmann (CAN)	Tayler Wiles (USA)
(Slovenia) Ljubljana–Domžale–Ljubljana TT	June 7	1.2	Marlen Reusser (SWI)	Olga Zabelinskaya (UZB)	Vittoria Bussi (ITA)
(Netherlands) Salverda Omloop van de IJsseldelta	June 8	1.2	Marta Tagliaferro (ITA)	Pernille Mathiesen (DEN)	Loes Adegeest (NED)
(Belgium) Dwars door de Westhoek	June 9	1.1	Elisa Balsamo (ITA)	Lorena Wiebes (NED)	Lotte Kopecky (BEL)
(Belgium) Diamond Tour	June 16	1.1	Lorena Wiebes (NED)	Elisa Balsamo (ITA)	Lotte Kopecky (BEL)
(Hungary) V4 Ladies Series – Restart Zalaegerszeg	July 6	1.2	Olga Shekel (UKR)	Monika Brzeźna (POL)	Kathrin Schweinberger (AUT)
(Canada) White Spot / Delta Road Race	July 7	1.2	Alison Jackson (CAN)	Marie-Soleil Blais (CAN)	Starla Teddergreen (USA)
(United States) Chrono Kristin Armstrong	July 12	1.2	Chloé Dygert (USA)	Olga Zabelinskaya (UZB)	Jennifer Luebke (USA)
(Spain) Emakumeen Nafarroako Klasikoa	July 30	1.2	Ashleigh Moolman-Pasio (RSA)	Lucy Kennedy (AUS)	Ane Santesteban (ESP)
(Spain) Clasica Femenina Navarra	August 1	1.2	Sarah Roy (AUS)	Maria Martins (POR)	Marta Lach (POL)
(Spain) Donostia San Sebastian Klasikoa	August 3	1.1	Lucy Kennedy (AUS)	Janneke Ensing (NED)	Pauliena Rooijakkers (NED)
(Belgium) Erondegemse Pijl	August 3	1.2	Monique van de Ree (NED)	Thị Thật Nguyễn (VIE)	Sofie De Vuyst (BEL)
(Belgium) MerXem Classic	August 11	1.2	Lotte Kopecky (BEL)	Charlotte Kool (NED)	Coryn Rivera (USA)
(Belgium) Flanders Ladies Classic	August 17	1.2	Julie van de Velde (BEL)	Sofie De Vuyst (BEL)	Lonneke Uneken (NED)
(France) La Périgord Ladies	August 18	1.2	Coralie Demay (FRA)	Kathrin Hammes (GER)	Evita Muzic (FRA)
(France) La Picto–Charentaise	August 30	1.2	Gladys Verhulst (FRA)	Lauren Kitchen (AUS)	Flávia Oliveira (BRA)
China Scenic Avenue I	September 7	1.2	Jiajun Sun (CHN)	Qianyu Yang (HKG)	Jiujin Li (CHN)
China Scenic Avenue II	September 8	1.2	Jiajun Sun (CHN)	Ju Pha Somnet (MYS)	Xisha Zhao (CHN)
(France) Chrono Champenois	September 8	1.1	Vita Heine (NOR)	Mieke Kröger (GER)	Marlen Reusser (SWI)
(France) GP de Fourmies	September 8	1.2	Thị Thật Nguyễn (VIE)	Kaat Hannes (BEL)	Pascale Jeuland (FRA)
(France) Grand Prix International d'Isbergues	September 22	1.2	Christine Majerus (LUX)	Clara Copponi (FRA)	Pascale Jeuland (FRA)
(Italy) Giro dell'Emilia Internazionale Donne Elite	October 5	1.1	Demi Vollering (NED)	Elisa Longo Borghini (ITA)	Nikola Nosková (CZE)
(Italy) Gran Premio Bruno Beghelli Internazionale Donne Elite	October 6	1.1	Marta Bastianelli (ITA)	Lorena Wiebes (NED)	Chiara Consonni (ITA)
(France) Chrono des Nations	October 22	1.1	Leah Thomas (USA)	Vita Heine (NOR)	Emma Cecilie Norsgaard (DEN)

† The clock symbol denotes a race which takes the form of a one-day time trial.

=== Events not returning from 2018 ===
- 100 Cycle Challenge
- Durango-Durango Emakumeen Saria
- Horizon Park Women Challenge
- VR Women ITT
- Winston-Salem Cycling Classic
- GP della Liberazione
- Veenendaal–Veenendaal Classic

== Stage races (2.1 and 2.2) ==
Race	Date	Cat.	Winner	Second	Third
(Australia) Santos Women's Tour	January 10–13	2.1	Amanda Spratt (AUS)	Lucy Kennedy (AUS)	Rachel Neylan (AUS)
(Australia) Womens Herald Sun Tour	January 30–31	2.2	Lucy Kennedy (AUS)	Amanda Spratt (AUS)	Brodie Chapman (AUS)
(Spain) Setmana Ciclista Valenciana	February 21–24	2.2	Clara Koppenburg (GER)	Soraya Paladin (ITA)	Ashleigh Moolman (RSA)
(United States) Joe Martin Stage Race	April 4–8	2.2	Chloé Dygert (USA)	Shannon Malseed (AUS)	Sara Bergen (CAN)
(Thailand) The Princess Maha Chackri Sirindhon's Cup	April 8–10	2.1	Jutatip Maneephan (THA)	Teniel Campbell (TRI)	Yumi Kajihara (JPN)
(Netherlands) Healthy Ageing Tour	April 10–14	2.1	Lisa Klein (GER)	Ellen van Dijk (NED)	Kirsten Wild (NED)
(United States) Tour of the Gila	May 1–5	2.2	Brodie Chapman (AUS)	Chloé Dygert (USA)	Jasmin Duehring (CAN)
(Czech Republic) Gracia–Orlová	May 2–5	2.2	Marta Bastianelli (ITA)	Julie van de Velde (BEL)	Mariia Novolodskaia (RUS)
(United Kingdom) Women's Tour de Yorkshire	May 3–4	2.1	Marianne Vos (NED)	Mavi García (ESP)	Soraya Paladin (ITA)
(Sweden) Tour of Uppsala	May 8–10	2.2	Sara Mustonen (SWE)	Vita Heine (NOR)	Lauren Dolan (UK)
(Luxembourg) Festival Luxembourgeois du cyclisme féminin Elsy Jacobs	May 10–12	2.1	Lisa Brennauer (GER)	Demi Vollering (NED)	Lizzy Banks (UK)
(Spain) Vuelta a Burgos Feminas	May 16–19	2.1	Stine Borgli (NOR)	Soraya Paladin (ITA)	Mavi García (ESP)
Tour Femenino de Venezuela	May 18–19	2.2	Lilibeth Chacón (VEN)	Clemilda Fernandes (BRA)	Maria Briceno (VEN)
(China) Tour of Zhoushan Island II	May 22–23	2.2	Thi Thu Mai Nguyen (VIE)	Annamarie Lipp (NZL)	Jiajun Sun (CHN)
(Thailand) The 60th Anniversary "Thai Cycling Association"	May 24–25	2.1	Yumi Kajihara (JPN)	Jutatip Maneephan (THA)	Hyunji Kim (KOR)
(Germany) Internationale Thüringen Rundfahrt der Frauen	May 28–June 2	2.1	Kathrin Hammes (GER)	Pernille Mathiesen (DEN)	Lourdes Oyarbide (ESP)
(France) Tour de Bretagne Féminin	June 5–9	2.2	Audrey Cordon-Ragot (FRA)	Kirsten Wild (NED)	Juliette Labous (FRA)
Vuelta Femenina a Guatemala	June 5–9	2.2	Liliana Moreno (COL)	Andrea Ramirez Fregoso (MEX)	Estefania Herrera Marin (COL)
(Czech Republic) Tour de Feminin-O cenu Českého Švýcarska	July 11–14	2.2	Vita Heine (NOR)	Aurela Nerlo (POL)	Yelyzaveta Oshurkova (RUS)
(Netherlands) BeNe Ladies Tour	July 18–21	2.1	Lisa Klein (GER)	Amy Pieters (NED)	Marlen Reusser (SWI)
(France) Tour de Belle Isle en Terre–Kreiz Breizh Elites Dames	August 1–2	2.2	Teniel Campbell (TRI)	Anna Henderson (UK)	Ingvild Gaskjenn (NOR)
(United Kingdom) Women's Tour of Scotland	August 9–11	2.1	Leah Thomas (USA)	Alison Jackson (CAN)	Stine Borgli (NOR)
(United States) Colorado Classic	August 22–25	2.1	Chloé Dygert Owen (USA)	Brodie Chapman (CAN)	Omer Shapira (ISR)
(Italy) Giro della Toscana	September 6–8	2.2	Arlenis Sierra (CUB)	Soraya Paladin (ITA)	Anastasia Chursina (RUS)
Lotto Belisol Belgium Tour	September 10–13	2.1	Mieke Kröger (GER)	Lotte Kopecky (BEL)	Audrey Cordon-Ragot (FRA)
(France) Tour Cycliste Féminin International de l'Ardèche	September 13–19	2.1	Marianne Vos (NED)	Clara Koppenburg (GER)	Eider Merino Cortazar (ESP)
(Italy) Giro delle Marche in Rosa	September 19–21	2.2	Soraya Paladin (ITA)	Marta Cavalli (ITA)	Rasa Leleivytė (LTU)
Vuelta a Colombia Femenina Oro y Paz	October 24–27	2.2	Aranza Villalón (CHI)	Camila Valbuena (COL)	Liliana Moreno (COL)
Vuelta a Colombia Femenina	December 3–7	2.2	Aranza Villalón (CHI)	Camila Valbuena (COL)	Leidy Natalia Muñoz Ruiz (COL)

=== Events not returning from 2018 ===
- Gran Premio Comite Olimpico Nacional Femenino
- Panorama Guizhou International Women's Road Cycling Race
- Tour of Dongting Lake International Women's Road Cycling Race
- Tour of Eftalia Hotels & Velo Alanya
- Tour of Zhoushan Island
- Vuelta Internacional Femenina a Costa Rica
- Le Tour de Femina Malaysia

=== Continental Championships ===
Championships	Race	Winner	Second	Third
African Continental Championships; Ethiopia	Road race	Mossana Debesai (ERI)	Eyeru Tesfoam Gebru (ETH)	Joanna Van de Winkel (RSA)
African Continental Championships; Ethiopia	Individual time trial	Selam Amha Gerefiel (ETH)	Eyeru Tesfoam Gebru (ETH)	Desiet Kidane Tekeste (ERI)
African Continental Championships; Ethiopia	Team time trial	Ethiopia	Eritrea	South Africa
Oceania Cycling Championships; Australia	Road race	Sharlotte Lucas (NZL)	Sarah Gigante (AUS)	Jemma Eastwood (AUS)
Oceania Cycling Championships; Australia	Individual time trial	Kate Perry (AUS)	Nicole Frain (AUS)	Jenny Pettenon (AUS)
Pan American Championships; Mexico	Road race	Ariadna Gutiérrez (MEX)	Denisse Ahumada (CHI)	Teniel Campbell (TRI)
Pan American Championships; Mexico	Individual time trial	Leah Thomas (USA)	Amber Neben (USA)	Constanza Victoria Paredes (CHI)
Pan American Championships; Mexico	Individual time trial (U23)	Teniel Campbell (TRI)	Jennifer Morales (CRI)	Jeidi Pradera (CUB)
Asian Cycling Championships; Uzbekistan (2019 summary)	Road race	Olga Zabelinskaya (UZB)	Ju Mi Lee (KOR)	Somayeh Yazdani (IRI)
Asian Cycling Championships; Uzbekistan (2019 summary)	Individual time trial	Olga Zabelinskaya (UZB)	Ah Reum Na (KOR)	Ting Ying Huang (TAI)
Asian Cycling Championships; Uzbekistan (2019 summary)	Team time trial	South Korea	Kazakhstan	Hong Kong
European Road Championships (2019 summary)	Road race	Amy Pieters (NED)	Elena Cecchini (ITA)	Lisa Klein (GER)
European Road Championships (2019 summary)	Individual time trial	Ellen van Dijk (NED)	Lisa Klein (GER)	Lucinda Brand (NED)
European Road Championships (2019 summary)	Road race (U23)	Letizia Paternoster (ITA)	Marta Lach (POL)	Lonneke Uneken (NED)
European Road Championships (2019 summary)	Individual time trial (U23)	Hannah Ludwig (GER)	Mariia Novolodskaia (RUS)	Elena Pirrone (ITA)
Elite Road Caribbean Championships; Cuba	Road race	Jeidi Pradera (CUB)	Iraida García (CUB)	Idarys Cervantes (CUB)
Elite Road Caribbean Championships; Cuba	Individual time trial	Caitlin Conyers (BER)	Jeidi Pradera (CUB)	Alexi Costa (TTO)
2019 Southeast Asian Games; Philippines	Road race	Nguyễn Thị Thật (VIE)	Jermyn Prado (PHI)	Ayustina Priatna (INA)
2019 Southeast Asian Games; Philippines	Individual time trial	Jermyn Prado (PHI)	Yi Wei Luo (SIN)	Phetdarin Somrat (THA)
2019 South Asian Games; Nepal	Road race	Sonali Chanu (IND)	Swasti Singh (IND)	Solochana Nawanage (SRI)
2019 South Asian Games; Nepal	Individual time trial	Elangbam Devi (IND)	Dinesha Mudiyanselage (SRI)	Udeshani Kumarasinghe (SRI)
