= List of teams and cyclists in the 2022 Giro Donne =

List of cyclists

The following is a list of teams and cyclists that took part in the 2022 Giro Donne.

== Teams ==
UCI Women's WorldTeams

- Canyon//SRAM
- EF Education–Tibco–SVB
- FDJ Suez Futuroscope
- Liv Racing Xstra
- Movistar Team
- Roland Cogeas Edelweiss Squad
- SD Worx
- Team BikeExchange–Jayco
- Team DSM
- Team Jumbo–Visma
- Trek–Segafredo
- UAE Team ADQ
- Uno-X Pro Cycling Team

UCI Women's Continental Teams

- Aromitalia–Basso Bikes–Vaiano
- Bepink
- Bizkaia–Durango
- Ceratizit–WNT Pro Cycling
- Cofidis
- Colombia Tierra de Atletas–GW–Shimano
- Isolmant–Premac–Vittoria
- Servetto–Makhymo–Beltrami TSA
- Team Mendelspeck
- Top Girls Fassa Bortolo
- Valcar–Travel & Service

== Cyclists ==
Legend
No.	Starting number worn by the rider during the Giro
Pos.	Position in the general classification
Time	Deficit to the winner of the general classification
†	Denotes riders born on or after 1 January 2000 eligible for the young rider classification
General classification	Denotes the winner of the general classification
Points classification	Denotes the winner of the points classification
Mountains classification	Denotes the winner of the mountains classification
Young rider classification	Denotes the winner of the young rider classification (eligibility indicated by †)
Italian rider classification	Denotes the winner of the Italian rider classification
Team classification	Denotes the winner of the team classification
DNS	Denotes a rider who did not start a stage, followed by the stage before which she withdrew
DNF	Denotes a rider who did not finish a stage, followed by the stage in which she withdrew
DSQ	Denotes a rider who was disqualified from the race, followed by the stage in which this occurred
OTL	Denotes a rider finished outside the time limit, followed by the stage in which they did so
Ages correct as of Thursday 30 June 2022, the date on which the Giro began

=== By starting number ===
No.	Name	Nationality	Team	Age	Pos.	Time	Ref.
1	Elena Cecchini	Italy	SD Worx	30	41	+ 1h 17' 36"	
2	Lonneke Uneken †	Netherlands	SD Worx	22	DNS-2	–	
3	Niamh Fisher-Black †	New Zealand	SD Worx	21	5	+ 11' 12"	
4	Christine Majerus	Luxembourg	SD Worx	35	DNS-6	–	
5	Blanka Vas †	Hungary	SD Worx	20	51	+ 1h 27' 07"	
6	Lotte Kopecky	Belgium	SD Worx	26	42	+ 1h 17' 40"	
11	Rasa Leleivytė	Lithuania	Aromitalia–Basso Bikes–Vaiano	33	25	+ 50' 37"	
12	Francesca Baroni	Italy	Aromitalia–Basso Bikes–Vaiano	22	100	+ 1h 58' 10"	
13	Inga Češulienė	Lithuania	Aromitalia–Basso Bikes–Vaiano	36	72	+ 1h 38' 20"	
14	Giulia Marchesini	Italy	Aromitalia–Basso Bikes–Vaiano	24	62	+ 1h 34' 10"	
15	Sofia Collinelli †	Italy	Aromitalia–Basso Bikes–Vaiano	20	DNF-7	–	
16	Gemma Sernissi †	Italy	Aromitalia–Basso Bikes–Vaiano	22	80	+ 1h 40' 54"	
21	Silvia Zanardi †	Italy	Bepink	22	DNS-6	–	
22	Giorgia Vettorello †	Italy	Bepink	21	75	+ 1h 38' 46"	
23	Nadia Quagliotto	Italy	Bepink	25	56	+ 1h 30' 28"	
24	Letizia Brufani †	Italy	Bepink	20	89	+ 1h 49' 28"	
25	Markéta Hájková †	Czechia	Bepink	22	65	+ 1h 36' 21"	
26	Matilde Vitillo †	Italy	Bepink	21	DNS-6	–	
31	Alba Teruel	Spain	Bizkaia–Durango	25	111	+ 2h 22' 45"	
32	Lucía González	Spain	Bizkaia–Durango	31	55	+ 1h 30' 03"	
33	Eukene Larrarte	Spain	Bizkaia–Durango	23	97	+ 1h 57' 24"	
34	Catalina Anais Soto †	Chile	Bizkaia–Durango	21	76	+ 1h 38' 52"	
35	Aileen Schweikart	Germany	Bizkaia–Durango	26	18	+ 32' 40"	
36	Sofia Rodríguez	Spain	Bizkaia–Durango	22	103	+ 2h 00' 52"	
41	Sarah Roy	Australia	Canyon//SRAM	36	71	+ 1h 37' 48"	
42	Neve Bradbury †	Australia	Canyon//SRAM	20	10	+ 17' 29"	
43	Soraya Paladin	Italy	Canyon//SRAM	29	36	+ 1h 09' 51"	
44	Elise Chabbey	Switzerland	Canyon//SRAM	29	12	+ 20' 50"	
45	Mikayla Harvey	New Zealand	Canyon//SRAM	23	20	+ 36' 10"	
46	Alena Amialiusik	(Note: As of 1 March 2022, the UCI announced that cyclists from Russia and Belarus would no longer compete under the name or flag of those respective countries due to the Russian invasion of Ukraine.)	Canyon//SRAM	33	21	+ 37' 03"	
51	Martina Fidanza	Italy	Ceratizit–WNT Pro Cycling	22	93	+ 1h 54' 37"	
52	Lara Vieceli	Italy	Ceratizit–WNT Pro Cycling	28	95	+ 1h 55' 27"	
53	Franziska Brauße	Germany	Ceratizit–WNT Pro Cycling	23	DNF-5	–	
54	Marta Lach	Poland	Ceratizit–WNT Pro Cycling	25	34	+ 1h 07' 06"	
55	Hanna Nilsson	Sweden	Ceratizit–WNT Pro Cycling	30	19	+ 34' 41"	
56	Lea Lin Teutenberg	Germany	Ceratizit–WNT Pro Cycling	22	73	+ 1h 38' 22"	
61	Clara Koppenburg	Germany	Cofidis	26	DNF-7	–	
62	Victoire Berteau †	France	Cofidis	21	68	+ 1h 36' 48"	
63	Martina Alzini	Italy	Cofidis	25	48	+ 1h 23' 06"	
64	Olivia Onesti †	France	Cofidis	18	57	+ 1h 30' 47"	
65	Rachel Neylan	Australia	Cofidis	40	DNS-P	–	
66	Sandra Lévénez	France	Cofidis	42	58	+ 1h 32' 06"	
71	Elizabeth Castaño †	Colombia	Colombia Tierra de Atletas–GW–Shimano	20	DNF-5	–	
72	Yeny Lorena Colmenares	Colombia	Colombia Tierra de Atletas–GW–Shimano	31	DNS-4	–	
73	Jennifer Ducuara	Colombia	Colombia Tierra de Atletas–GW–Shimano	26	52	+ 1h 27' 37"	
74	Lina Hernández	Colombia	Colombia Tierra de Atletas–GW–Shimano	23	DNF-9	–	
75	Estefanía Herrera	Colombia	Colombia Tierra de Atletas–GW–Shimano	28	107	+ 2h 06' 06"	
76	Jessenia Meneses	Colombia	Colombia Tierra de Atletas–GW–Shimano	27	92	+ 1h 52' 48"	
81	Krista Doebel-Hickok	United States	EF Education–Tibco–SVB	33	15	+ 28' 02"	
82	Letizia Borghesi	Italy	EF Education–Tibco–SVB	23	81	+ 1h 42' 18"	
83	Magdeleine Vallieres †	Canada	EF Education–Tibco–SVB	20	38	+ 1h 16' 14"	
84	Kathrin Hammes	Germany	EF Education–Tibco–SVB	33	29	+ 53' 18"	
85	Abi Smith †	Great Britain	EF Education–Tibco–SVB	20	91	+ 1h 51' 32"	
86	Sara Poidevin	Canada	EF Education–Tibco–SVB	26	85	+ 1h 47' 47"	
91	Marta Cavalli	Italy	FDJ Suez Futuroscope	24	2	+ 1' 52"	
92	Brodie Chapman	Australia	FDJ Suez Futuroscope	31	28	+ 52' 41"	
93	Clara Copponi	France	FDJ Suez Futuroscope	23	105	+ 2h 04' 36"	
94	Emilia Fahlin	Sweden	FDJ Suez Futuroscope	33	88	+ 1h 49' 12"	
95	Cecilie Uttrup Ludwig	Denmark	FDJ Suez Futuroscope	26	6	+ 12' 14"	
96	Évita Muzic	France	FDJ Suez Futuroscope	23	14	+ 23' 40"	
101	Gaia Realini †	Italy	Isolmant–Premac–Vittoria	21	13	+ 23' 38"	
102	Alice Gasparini	Italy	Isolmant–Premac–Vittoria	24	84	+ 1h 46' 06"	
103	Noemi Lucrezia Eremita †	Italy	Isolmant–Premac–Vittoria	19	112	+ 2h 24' 04"	
104	Asia Zontone †	Italy	Isolmant–Premac–Vittoria	20	DNF-3	–	
105	Emanuela Zanetti †	Italy	Isolmant–Premac–Vittoria	22	113	+ 2h 24' 33"	
106	Beatrice Rossato	Italy	Isolmant–Premac–Vittoria	25	35	+ 1h 07' 58"	
111	Rachele Barbieri	Italy	Liv Racing Xstra	25	39	+ 1h 16' 17"	
112	Marta Jaskulska †	Poland	Liv Racing Xstra	22	77	+ 1h 39' 46"	
113	Thalita de Jong	Netherlands	Liv Racing Xstra	28	32	+ 1h 05' 04"	
114	Katia Ragusa	Italy	Liv Racing Xstra	25	50	+ 1h 23' 44"	
115	Quinty Ton	Netherlands	Liv Racing Xstra	23	DNF-7	–	
116	Tereza Neumanová	Czechia	Liv Racing Xstra	23	DNS-7	–	
121	Emma Norsgaard	Denmark	Movistar Team	22	99	+ 1h 57' 35"	
122	Aude Biannic	France	Movistar Team	31	106	+ 2h 05' 36"	
123	Jelena Erić	Serbia	Movistar Team	26	43	+ 1h 17' 58"	
124	Paula Andrea Patiño	Colombia	Movistar Team	25	26	+ 51' 26"	
125	Arlenis Sierra	Cuba	Movistar Team	29	DNS-6	–	
126	Annemiek van Vleuten	Netherlands	Movistar Team	39	1	27h 07' 26"	
131	Caroline Baur	Switzerland	Roland Cogeas Edelweiss Squad	28	66	+ 1h 36' 43"	
132	Rotem Gafinovitz	Israel	Roland Cogeas Edelweiss Squad	30	74	+ 1h 38' 44"	
133	Aline Seitz	Switzerland	Roland Cogeas Edelweiss Squad	25	101	+ 1h 58' 53"	
134	Petra Stiasny †	Switzerland	Roland Cogeas Edelweiss Squad	20	22	+ 44' 17"	
135	Anna Gabrielle Traxler	Canada	Roland Cogeas Edelweiss Squad	24	45	+ 1h 19' 06"	
136	Olga Zabelinskaya	Uzbekistan	Roland Cogeas Edelweiss Squad	42	DNF-5	–	
141	Milagro Mena	Costa Rica	Servetto–Makhymo–Beltrami TSA	29	87	+ 1h 49' 09"	
142	Anna Potokina		Servetto–Makhymo–Beltrami TSA	35	DNS-1	–	
143	Isotta Barbieri	Italy	Servetto–Makhymo–Beltrami TSA	27	DNF-1	–	
144	Sofia Barbieri	Italy	Servetto–Makhymo–Beltrami TSA	24	110	+ 2h 22' 18"	
145	Maryna Ivaniuk	Ukraine	Servetto–Makhymo–Beltrami TSA	31	DNF-5	–	
146	Viktoriia Melnychuk	Ukraine	Servetto–Makhymo–Beltrami TSA	24	DNF-2	–	
151	Amanda Spratt	Australia	Team BikeExchange–Jayco	34	DNS-7	–	
152	Georgia Williams	New Zealand	Team BikeExchange–Jayco	28	33	+ 1h 06' 32"	
153	Kristen Faulkner	United States	Team BikeExchange–Jayco	29	11	+ 18' 31"	
154	Georgia Baker	Australia	Team BikeExchange–Jayco	27	DNS-7	–	
155	Nina Kessler	Netherlands	Team BikeExchange–Jayco	33	69	+ 1h 37' 04"	
156	Teniel Campbell	Trinidad and Tobago	Team BikeExchange–Jayco	24	83	+ 1h 44' 00"	
161	Megan Jastrab †	United States	Team DSM	20	86	+ 1h 48' 53"	
162	Leah Kirchmann	Canada	Team DSM	32	90	+ 1h 50' 45"	
163	Franziska Koch †	Germany	Team DSM	21	82	+ 1h 42' 54"	
164	Charlotte Kool	Netherlands	Team DSM	23	104	+ 2h 01' 41"	
165	Juliette Labous	France	Team DSM	23	9	+ 15' 49"	
166	Floortje Mackaij	Netherlands	Team DSM	26	DNS-P	–	
171	Amber Kraak	Netherlands	Team Jumbo–Visma	27	53	+ 1h 29' 41"	
172	Marianne Vos	Netherlands	Team Jumbo–Visma	35	DNS-6	–	
173	Anouska Koster	Netherlands	Team Jumbo–Visma	28	16	+ 29' 03"	
174	Riejanne Markus	Netherlands	Team Jumbo–Visma	27	DNS-5	–	
175	Karlijn Swinkels	Netherlands	Team Jumbo–Visma	23	79	+ 1h 40' 35"	
176	Romy Kasper	Germany	Team Jumbo–Visma	34	37	+ 1h 14' 59"	
181	Eva Maria Gatscher	Italy	Team Mendelspeck	25	31	+ 1h 01' 46"	
182	Vania Canvelli	Italy	Team Mendelspeck	24	64	+ 1h 34' 45"	
183	Francesca Pisciali	Italy	Team Mendelspeck	24	102	+ 1h 59' 33"	
184	Angela Oro †	Italy	Team Mendelspeck	20	46	+ 1h 21' 44"	
185	Alessia Missiaggia	Italy	Team Mendelspeck	23	109	+ 2h 20' 48"	
186	Beatrice Pozzobon †	Italy	Team Mendelspeck	21	108	+ 2h 15' 18"	
191	Giorgia Bariani †	Italy	Top Girls Fassa Bortolo	21	60	+ 1h 32' 59"	
192	Greta Marturano	Italy	Top Girls Fassa Bortolo	24	23	+ 44' 22"	
193	Iris Monticolo †	Italy	Top Girls Fassa Bortolo	21	78	+ 1h 40' 22"	
194	Alice Palazzi †	Italy	Top Girls Fassa Bortolo	20	44	+ 1h 18' 24"	
195	Cristina Tonetti †	Italy	Top Girls Fassa Bortolo	19	47	+ 1h 21' 46"	
196	Alessia Vigilia	Italy	Top Girls Fassa Bortolo	31	27	+ 52' 05"	
201	Elisa Balsamo	Italy	Trek–Segafredo	24	49	+ 1h 23' 29"	
202	Lucinda Brand	Netherlands	Trek–Segafredo	32	17	+ 32' 31"	
203	Amalie Dideriksen	Denmark	Trek–Segafredo	26	94	+ 1h 55' 14"	
204	Lauretta Hanson	Australia	Trek–Segafredo	27	98	+ 1h 57' 25"	
205	Elisa Longo Borghini	Italy	Trek–Segafredo	30	4	+ 6' 45"	
206	Leah Thomas	United States	Trek–Segafredo	33	24	+ 45' 20"	
211	Mavi García	Spain	UAE Team ADQ	38	3	+ 5' 56"	
212	Erica Magnaldi	Italy	UAE Team ADQ	29	8	+ 15' 13"	
213	Laura Tomasi	Italy	UAE Team ADQ	22	DNS-P	–	
214	Marta Bastianelli	Italy	UAE Team ADQ	35	40	+ 1h 17' 12"	
215	Sofia Bertizzolo	Italy	UAE Team ADQ	24	61	+ 1h 32' 59"	
216	Anna Trevisi	Italy	UAE Team ADQ	30	63	+ 1h 34' 11"	
221	Wilma Olausson †	Sweden	Uno-X Pro Cycling Team	21	DNF-3	–	
222	Hannah Barnes	Great Britain	Uno-X Pro Cycling Team	29	96	+ 1h 56' 45"	
223	Marte Berg Edseth	Norway	Uno-X Pro Cycling Team	23	DNF-7	–	
224	Hannah Ludwig †	Germany	Uno-X Pro Cycling Team	22	DNS-1	–	
225	Amalie Lutro †	Norway	Uno-X Pro Cycling Team	22	67	+ 1h 36' 44"	
226	Julie Leth	Denmark	Uno-X Pro Cycling Team	29	DNF-8	–	
231	Olivia Baril	Canada	Valcar–Travel & Service	24	DNF-2	–	
232	Alice Maria Arzuffi	Italy	Valcar–Travel & Service	27	30	+ 58' 55"	
233	Silvia Persico	Italy	Valcar–Travel & Service	24	7	+ 13' 08"	
234	Chiara Consonni	Italy	Valcar–Travel & Service	23	59	+ 1h 32' 49"	
235	Karolina Kumięga	Poland	Valcar–Travel & Service	23	54	+ 1h 29' 55"	
236	Anastasia Carbonari	Latvia	Valcar–Travel & Service	22	70	+ 1h 37' 23"	

=== By team ===
(Netherlands) SD Worx (SDW)
No.	Rider	Pos.
1	Elena Cecchini (ITA)	41
2	Lonneke Uneken (NED)	DNS-2
3	Niamh Fisher-Black (NZL)	5
4	Christine Majerus (LUX)	DNS-6
5	Blanka Vas (HUN)	51
6	Lotte Kopecky (BEL)	42

(Italy) Aromitalia–Basso Bikes–Vaiano (VAI)
No.	Rider	Pos.
11	Rasa Leleivytė (LTU)	25
12	Francesca Baroni (ITA)	100
13	Inga Češulienė (LTU)	72
14	Giulia Marchesini (ITA)	62
15	Sofia Collinelli (ITA)	DNF-7
16	Gemma Sernissi (ITA)	80

(Italy) Bepink (BPK)
No.	Rider	Pos.
21	Silvia Zanardi (ITA)	DNS-6
22	Giorgia Vettorello (ITA)	75
23	Nadia Quagliotto (ITA)	56
24	Letizia Brufani (ITA)	89
25	Markéta Hájková (CZE)	65
26	Matilde Vitillo (ITA)	DNS-6

(Spain) Bizkaia–Durango (BDU)
No.	Rider	Pos.
31	Alba Teruel (ESP)	111
32	Lucía González (ESP)	55
33	Eukene Larrarte (ESP)	97
34	Catalina Anais Soto (CHI)	76
35	Aileen Schweikart (GER)	18
36	Sofia Rodríguez (ESP)	103

(Germany) Canyon//SRAM (CSR)
No.	Rider	Pos.
41	Sarah Roy (AUS)	71
42	Neve Bradbury (AUS)	10
43	Soraya Paladin (ITA)	36
44	Elise Chabbey (SUI)	12
45	Mikayla Harvey (NZL)	20
46	Alena Amialiusik	21

(Germany) Ceratizit–WNT Pro Cycling (WNT)
No.	Rider	Pos.
51	Martina Fidanza (ITA)	93
52	Lara Vieceli (ITA)	95
53	Franziska Brauße (GER)	DNF-5
54	Marta Lach (POL)	34
55	Hanna Nilsson (SWE)	19
56	Lea Lin Teutenberg (GER)	73

(France) Cofidis (COD)
No.	Rider	Pos.
61	Clara Koppenburg (GER)	DNF-7
62	Victoire Berteau (FRA)	68
63	Martina Alzini (ITA)	48
64	Olivia Onesti (FRA)	57
65	Rachel Neylan (AUS)	DNS-P
66	Sandra Lévénez (FRA)	58

Colombia Tierra de Atletas–GW–Shimano (CTF)
No.	Rider	Pos.
71	Elizabeth Castaño (COL)	DNF-5
72	Yeny Lorena Colmenares (COL)	DNS-4
73	Jennifer Ducuara (COL)	52
74	Lina Hernández (COL)	DNF-9
75	Estefanía Herrera (COL)	107
76	Jessenia Meneses (COL)	92

(United States) EF Education–Tibco–SVB (EFE)
No.	Rider	Pos.
81	Krista Doebel-Hickok (USA)	15
82	Letizia Borghesi (ITA)	81
83	Magdeleine Vallieres (CAN)	38
84	Kathrin Hammes (GER)	29
85	Abi Smith (GBR)	91
86	Sara Poidevin (CAN)	85

(France) FDJ Suez Futuroscope (FDJ)
No.	Rider	Pos.
91	Marta Cavalli (ITA)	2
92	Brodie Chapman (AUS)	28
93	Clara Copponi (FRA)	105
94	Emilia Fahlin (SWE)	88
95	Cecilie Uttrup Ludwig (DEN)	6
96	Évita Muzic (FRA)	14

(Italy) Isolmant–Premac–Vittoria (SBT)
No.	Rider	Pos.
101	Gaia Realini (ITA)	13
102	Alice Gasparini (ITA)	84
103	Noemi Lucrezia Eremita (ITA)	112
104	Asia Zontone (ITA)	DNF-3
105	Emanuela Zanetti (ITA)	113
106	Beatrice Rossato (ITA)	35

(Netherlands) Liv Racing Xstra (DSB)
No.	Rider	Pos.
111	Rachele Barbieri (ITA)	39
112	Marta Jaskulska (POL)	77
113	Thalita de Jong (NED)	32
114	Katia Ragusa (ITA)	50
115	Quinty Ton (ITA)	DNF-7
116	Tereza Neumanová (CZE)	DNS-7

(Spain) Movistar Team (MOV)
No.	Rider	Pos.
121	Emma Norsgaard (DEN)	99
122	Aude Biannic (FRA)	106
123	Jelena Erić (SRB)	43
124	Paula Andrea Patiño (COL)	26
125	Arlenis Sierra (CUB)	DNS-6
126	Annemiek van Vleuten (NED)	1

(Switzerland) Roland Cogeas Edelweiss Squad (CGS)
No.	Rider	Pos.
131	Caroline Baur (SUI)	66
132	Rotem Gafinovitz (ISR)	74
133	Aline Seitz (SUI)	101
134	Petra Stiasny (SUI)	22
135	Anna Gabrielle Traxler (CAN)	45
136	Olga Zabelinskaya (UZB)	DNF-5

(Italy) Servetto–Makhymo–Beltrami TSA (SER)
No.	Rider	Pos.
141	Milagro Mena (CRC)	87
142	Anna Potokina	DNS-1
143	Isotta Barbieri (ITA)	DNF-1
144	Sofia Barbieri (ITA)	110
145	Maryna Ivaniuk (UKR)	DNF-5
146	Viktoriia Melnychuk (UKR)	DNF-2

(Australia) Team BikeExchange–Jayco (BEX)
No.	Rider	Pos.
151	Amanda Spratt (AUS)	DNS-7
152	Georgia Williams (NZL)	33
153	Kristen Faulkner (USA)	11
154	Georgia Baker (AUS)	DNS-7
155	Nina Kessler (NED)	69
156	Teniel Campbell (TRI)	83

(Netherlands) Team DSM (DSM)
No.	Rider	Pos.
161	Megan Jastrab (USA)	86
162	Leah Kirchmann (CAN)	90
163	Franziska Koch (GER)	82
164	Charlotte Kool (NED)	104
165	Juliette Labous (FRA)	9
166	Floortje Mackaij (NED)	DNS-P

(Netherlands) Team Jumbo–Visma (JVW)
No.	Rider	Pos.
171	Amber Kraak (NED)	53
172	Marianne Vos (NED)	DNS-6
173	Anouska Koster (NED)	16
174	Riejanne Markus (NED)	DNS-5
175	Karlijn Swinkels (NED)	79
176	Romy Kasper (GER)	37

(Italy) Team Mendelspeck (MDS)
No.	Rider	Pos.
181	Eva Maria Gatscher (ITA)	31
182	Vania Canvelli (ITA)	64
183	Francesca Pisciali (ITA)	102
184	Angela Oro (ITA)	46
185	Alessia Missiaggia (ITA)	109
186	Beatrice Pozzobon (ITA)	108

(Italy) Top Girls Fassa Bortolo (TOP)
No.	Rider	Pos.
191	Giorgia Bariani (ITA)	60
192	Greta Marturano (ITA)	23
193	Iris Monticolo (ITA)	78
194	Alice Palazzi (ITA)	44
195	Cristina Tonetti (ITA)	47
196	Alessia Vigilia (ITA)	27

(United States) Trek–Segafredo (TFS)
No.	Rider	Pos.
201	Elisa Balsamo (ITA)	49
202	Lucinda Brand (NED)	17
203	Amalie Dideriksen (DEN)	94
204	Lauretta Hanson (AUS)	98
205	Elisa Longo Borghini (ITA)	4
206	Leah Thomas (USA)	24

(Italy) UAE Team ADQ (UAD)
No.	Rider	Pos.
211	Mavi García (ESP)	3
212	Erica Magnaldi (ITA)	8
213	Laura Tomasi (ITA)	DNS-P
214	Marta Bastianelli (ITA)	40
215	Sofia Bertizzolo (ITA)	61
216	Anna Trevisi (ITA)	63

(Norway) Uno-X Pro Cycling Team (UXT)
No.	Rider	Pos.
221	Wilma Olausson (SWE)	DNF-3
222	Hannah Barnes (GBR)	96
223	Marte Berg Edseth (NOR)	DNF-7
224	Hannah Ludwig (GER)	DNS-1
225	Amalie Lutro (NOR)	67
226	Julie Leth (DEN)	DNF-8

(Italy) Valcar–Travel & Service (VAL)
No.	Rider	Pos.
231	Olivia Baril (CAN)	DNF-2
232	Alice Maria Arzuffi (ITA)	30
233	Silvia Persico (ITA)	7
234	Chiara Consonni (ITA)	59
235	Karolina Kumięga (POL)	54
236	Anastasia Carbonari (LVA)	70

=== By nationality ===
Country	No. of riders	Finished	Stage wins
Australia	7	4	
Belgium	1	1	
Canada	5	4	
Chile	1	1	
Colombia	7	4	
Costa Rica	1	1	
Cuba	1	0	
Czechia	2	1	
Denmark	4	3	
France	7	7	1 (Juliette Labous)
Germany	8	5	
Great Britain	2	2	
Hungary	1	1	
Israel	1	1	
Italy	48	42	3 (Elisa Balsamo x2, Chiara Consonni)
Latvia	1	1	
Lithuania	2	2	
Luxembourg	1	0	
Netherlands	13	8	4 (Annemiek van Vleuten x2, Marianne Vos x2)
New Zealand	3	3	
Norway	2	1	
Poland	3	3	
Serbia	1	1	
Spain	5	5	
Sweden	3	2	
Switzerland	4	4	
Trinidad and Tobago	1	1	
Ukraine	2	0	
United States	4	4	2 (Kristen Faulkner x2)
Uzbekistan	1	0	
	2	1	
Total	144	113	10
