= List of teams and cyclists in the 2023 Giro Donne =

List of cyclists

The following is a list of teams and cyclists that competed in the 2023 Giro Donne.

== Teams ==
24 teams are participating in the race. Each team has seven riders, one more than the 2022 edition. All 15 UCI Women's WorldTeams were automatically invited. They were joined by 9 UCI Women's Continental Teams selected by organisers PMG Sport/Starlight. The teams were announced on 25 May 2023.

UCI Women's WorldTeams

- Canyon//SRAM
- EF Education–Tibco–SVB
- FDJ–Suez
- Fenix–Deceuninck
- Human Powered Health
- Israel Premier Tech Roland
- Lidl–Trek
- Liv Racing TeqFind
- Movistar Team
- Team dsm–firmenich
- Team Jayco–AlUla
- Team Jumbo–Visma
- SD Worx
- UAE Team ADQ
- Uno-X Pro Cycling Team

UCI Women's Continental Teams

- AG Insurance–Soudal–Quick-Step
- Aromitalia–Basso Bikes–Vaiano
- Bepink
- Bizkaia–Durango
- Born To Win-Zhiraf-G20
- GB Junior Team Piemonte
- Isolmant–Premac–Vittoria
- Team Mendelspeck
- Top Girls Fassa Bortolo

== Cyclists ==
Legend
No.	Starting number worn by the rider during the Giro
Pos.	Position in the general classification
Time	Deficit to the winner of the general classification
‡	Denotes riders born on or after 1 January 2001 eligible for the young rider classification
General classification	Denotes the winner of the general classification
Points classification	Denotes the winner of the points classification
Mountains classification	Denotes the winner of the mountains classification
Young rider classification	Denotes the winner of the young rider classification (eligibility indicated by ‡)
Italian rider classification	Denotes the winner of the Italian rider classification
DNS	Denotes a rider who did not start a stage, followed by the stage before which she withdrew
DNF	Denotes a rider who did not finish a stage, followed by the stage in which she withdrew
DSQ	Denotes a rider who was disqualified from the race, followed by the stage in which this occurred
OTL	Denotes a rider finished outside the time limit, followed by the stage in which they did so
Ages correct as of Friday 30 June 2023, the date on which the Giro began

=== By starting number ===
No.	Name	Nationality	Team	Age	Pos.	Time	Ref.
1	Annemiek van Vleuten	Netherlands	Movistar Team	40	1	24h 26' 25"	
2	Aude Biannic	France	Movistar Team	32	104	+ 1h 46' 14"	
3	Sheyla Gutiérrez	Spain	Movistar Team	29	118	+ 2h 00' 18"	
4	Liane Lippert	Germany	Movistar Team	25	16	+ 18' 56"	
5	Floortje Mackaij	Netherlands	Movistar Team	27	41	+ 49' 00"	
6	Sara Martín	Spain	Movistar Team	24	83	+ 1h 29' 09"	
7	Paula Andrea Patiño	Colombia	Movistar Team	26	18	+ 20' 01"	
11	Justine Ghekiere	Belgium	AG Insurance–Soudal–Quick-Step	27	24	+ 31' 29"	
12	Marthe Goossens ‡	Belgium	AG Insurance–Soudal–Quick-Step	21	61	+ 1h 11' 18"	
13	Britt Knaven	Belgium	AG Insurance–Soudal–Quick-Step	22	DNS-5	–	
14	Gaia Masetti ‡	Italy	AG Insurance–Soudal–Quick-Step	21	45	+ 54' 08"	
15	Ilse Pluimers ‡	Netherlands	AG Insurance–Soudal–Quick-Step	21	70	+ 1h 18' 53"	
16	Ally Wollaston ‡	New Zealand	AG Insurance–Soudal–Quick-Step	22	46	+ 54' 53"	
17	Maud Rijnbeek ‡	Netherlands	AG Insurance–Soudal–Quick-Step	20	64	+ 1h 14' 15"	
21	Irene Affolati ‡	Italy	Aromitalia–Basso Bikes–Vaiano	21	120	+ 2h 02' 53"	
22	Lara Scarselli ‡	Italy	Aromitalia–Basso Bikes–Vaiano	20	DNF-6	–	
23	Francesca Baroni	Italy	Aromitalia–Basso Bikes–Vaiano	23	98	+ 1h 40' 26"	
24	Fanny Bonini ‡	Italy	Aromitalia–Basso Bikes–Vaiano	20	128	+ 2h 25' 46"	
25	Milena del Sarto ‡	Italy	Aromitalia–Basso Bikes–Vaiano	20	DNF-9	–	
26	Rasa Leleivytė	Lithuania	Aromitalia–Basso Bikes–Vaiano	34	75	+ 1h 21' 00"	
27	Ainhoa Moreno ‡	Spain	Aromitalia–Basso Bikes–Vaiano	18	DNF-4	–	
31	Andrea Casagranda ‡	Italy	Bepink	18	123	+ 2h 08' 37"	
32	Valentina Basilico ‡	Italy	Bepink	20	96	+ 1h 40' 00"	
33	Karolina Karasiewicz	Poland	Bepink	30	OTL-5	–	
34	Prisca Savi ‡	Italy	Bepink	21	127	+ 2h 22' 23"	
35	Giorgia Vettorello	Italy	Bepink	22	66	+ 1h 17' 37"	
36	Matilde Vitillo ‡	Italy	Bepink	22	78	+ 1h 24' 29"	
37	Silvia Zanardi	Italy	Bepink	23	54	+ 1h 03' 38"	
41	Lucía González	Spain	Bizkaia–Durango	32	71	+ 1h 19' 29"	
42	Ana Vitória Magalhães	Brazil	Bizkaia–Durango	22	DNS-4	–	
43	Sandra Gutierrez ‡	Spain	Bizkaia–Durango	20	132	+ 2h 48' 32"	
44	Irene Mendez	Spain	Bizkaia–Durango	31	119	+ 2h 02' 49"	
45	Beatriz Pereira ‡	Portugal	Bizkaia–Durango	19	133	+ 2h 51' 38"	
46	Sofia Rodríguez	Spain	Bizkaia–Durango	23	DNF-9	–	
47	Catalina Anais Soto ‡	Chile	Bizkaia–Durango	22	DNF-9	–	
51	Sofia Barbieri	Italy	Born To Win-Zhiraf-G20	25	DNF-3	–	
52	Sara Casasola	Italy	Born To Win-Zhiraf-G20	23	DNF-8	–	
53	Lea Fuchs	Switzerland	Born To Win-Zhiraf-G20	32	106	+ 1h 47' 45"	
54	Nika Myalitsina ‡		Born To Win-Zhiraf-G20	20	DNF-5	–	
55	Yana Myalitsina ‡		Born To Win-Zhiraf-G20	20	100	+ 1h 41' 11"	
56	Vanessa Santeliz	Venezuela	Born To Win-Zhiraf-G20	32	OTL-5	–	
57	Ella Simpson ‡	Australia	Born To Win-Zhiraf-G20	20	DNF-3	–	
61	Neve Bradbury ‡	Australia	Canyon//SRAM	21	DNF-9	–	
62	Tiffany Cromwell	Australia	Canyon//SRAM	34	63	+ 1h 13' 20"	
63	Chloé Dygert	United States	Canyon//SRAM	26	32	+ 38' 40"	
64	Antonia Niedermaier ‡	Germany	Canyon//SRAM	20	DNF-6	–	
65	Soraya Paladin	Italy	Canyon//SRAM	30	27	+ 33' 01"	
66	Pauliena Rooijakkers	Netherlands	Canyon//SRAM	30	12	+ 12' 11"	
67	Sarah Roy	Australia	Canyon//SRAM	37	39	+ 47' 43"	
71	Elizabeth Banks	Great Britain	EF Education–Tibco–SVB	32	99	+ 1h 40' 35"	
72	Letizia Borghesi	Italy	EF Education–Tibco–SVB	24	40	+ 48' 48"	
73	Veronica Ewers	United States	EF Education–Tibco–SVB	28	4	+ 5' 34"	
74	Kathrin Hammes	Germany	EF Education–Tibco–SVB	34	DNS-4	–	
75	Lauren Stephens	United States	EF Education–Tibco–SVB	36	47	+ 55' 59"	
76	Magdeleine Vallieres ‡	Canada	EF Education–Tibco–SVB	21	DNF-9	–	
77	Georgia Williams	New Zealand	EF Education–Tibco–SVB	29	42	+ 49' 13"	
81	Marta Cavalli	Italy	FDJ–Suez	25	14	+ 17' 26"	
82	Eugénie Duval	France	FDJ–Suez	30	74	+ 1h 19' 56"	
83	Victorie Guilman	France	FDJ–Suez	27	21	+ 25' 15"	
84	Marie Le Net	France	FDJ–Suez	23	44	+ 52' 40"	
85	Cecilie Uttrup Ludwig	Denmark	FDJ–Suez	27	6	+ 6' 16"	
86	Évita Muzic	France	FDJ–Suez	24	17	+ 19' 31"	
87	Gladys Verhulst	France	FDJ–Suez	26	60	+ 1h 09' 56"	
91	Maria Martins	Portugal	Fenix–Deceuninck	23	DNF-4	–	
92	Greta Marturano	Italy	Fenix–Deceuninck	25	20	+ 24' 22"	
93	Carina Schrempf	Austria	Fenix–Deceuninck	28	69	+ 1h 18' 17"	
94	Petra Stiasny ‡	Switzerland	Fenix–Deceuninck	21	23	+ 30' 11"	
95	Inge van der Heijden	Netherlands	Fenix–Deceuninck	23	35	+ 42' 30"	
96	Annemarie Worst	Netherlands	Fenix–Deceuninck	27	92	+ 1h 36' 00"	
97	Sophie Wright	Great Britain	Fenix–Deceuninck	24	84	+ 1h 29' 40"	
101	Noemi Lucrezia Eremita ‡	Italy	GB Junior Team Piemonte	20	97	+ 1h 40' 12"	
102	Monia Garavaglia ‡	Italy	GB Junior Team Piemonte	20	131	+ 2h 40' 43"	
103	Giulia Giuliani ‡	Italy	GB Junior Team Piemonte	20	126	+ 2h 19' 05"	
104	Vittoria Ruffilli ‡	Italy	GB Junior Team Piemonte	21	OTL-5	–	
105	Gemma Sernissi	Italy	GB Junior Team Piemonte	23	117	+ 1h 59' 45"	
106	Sylvie Truc ‡	Italy	GB Junior Team Piemonte	21	OTL-5	–	
107	Elisa Valtulini ‡	Italy	GB Junior Team Piemonte	18	DNS-4	–	
111	Nina Buijsman	Netherlands	Human Powered Health	25	26	+ 31' 48"	
112	Audrey Cordon-Ragot	France	Human Powered Health	33	52	+ 1h 02' 15"	
113	Barbara Malcotti	Italy	Human Powered Health	23	19	+ 24' 08"	
114	Daria Pikulik	Poland	Human Powered Health	26	DNF-6	–	
115	Marit Raaijmakers	Netherlands	Human Powered Health	24	94	+ 1h 37' 52"	
116	Lily Williams	United States	Human Powered Health	29	80	+ 1h 25' 12"	
117	Eri Yonamine	Japan	Human Powered Health	32	82	+ 1h 26' 49"	
121	Carlotta Borello ‡	Italy	Isolmant–Premac–Vittoria	21	130	+ 2h 38' 45"	
122	Carmela Cipriani	Italy	Isolmant–Premac–Vittoria	26	76	+ 1h 21' 09"	
123	Valeria Curnis	Italy	Isolmant–Premac–Vittoria	28	DNF-3	–	
124	Beatrice Rossato	Italy	Isolmant–Premac–Vittoria	26	65	+ 1h 15' 38"	
125	Emanuela Zanetti	Italy	Isolmant–Premac–Vittoria	23	OTL-5	–	
126	Asia Zontone ‡	Italy	Isolmant–Premac–Vittoria	21	122	+ 2h 07' 46"	
131	Maggie Coles-Lyster	Canada	Israel Premier Tech Roland	24	DNS-5	–	
132	Sofia Collinelli ‡	Italy	Israel Premier Tech Roland	21	DNS-8	–	
133	Anna Kiesenhofer	Austria	Israel Premier Tech Roland	32	53	+ 1h 02' 39"	
134	Silvia Magri	Italy	Israel Premier Tech Roland	22	115	+ 1h 58' 16"	
135	Thị Thật Nguyễn	Vietnam	Israel Premier Tech Roland	30	DNF-8	–	
136	Elena Pirrone	Italy	Israel Premier Tech Roland	24	36	+ 43' 23"	
137	Elizabeth Stannard	Australia	Israel Premier Tech Roland	26	28	+ 33' 07"	
141	Rachele Barbieri	Italy	Liv Racing TeqFind	26	95	+ 1h 39' 38"	
142	Valerie Demey	Belgium	Liv Racing TeqFind	29	108	+ 1h 49' 30"	
143	Mavi García	Spain	Liv Racing TeqFind	39	7	+ 6' 25"	
144	Marta Jaskulska	Poland	Liv Racing TeqFind	23	77	+ 1h 22' 55"	
145	Tereza Neumanová	Czechia	Liv Racing TeqFind	24	72	+ 1h 19' 39"	
146	Katia Ragusa	Italy	Liv Racing TeqFind	26	107	+ 1h 49' 05"	
147	Quinty Ton	Netherlands	Liv Racing TeqFind	24	50	+ 1h 00' 05"	
151	Francesca Barale ‡	Italy	Team dsm–firmenich	20	30	+ 36' 00"	
152	Eleonora Ciabocco ‡	Italy	Team dsm–firmenich	19	79	+ 1h 24' 49"	
153	Megan Jastrab ‡	United States	Team dsm–firmenich	21	88	+ 1h 33' 02"	
154	Franziska Koch	Germany	Team dsm–firmenich	22	105	+ 1h 47' 31"	
155	Juliette Labous	France	Team dsm–firmenich	24	2	+ 3' 56"	
156	Esmée Peperkamp	Netherlands	Team dsm–firmenich	25	15	+ 17' 32"	
157	Becky Storrie	Great Britain	Team dsm–firmenich	24	51	+ 1h 00' 19"	
161	Georgia Baker	Australia	Team Jayco–AlUla	28	111	+ 1h 55' 03"	
162	Ingvild Gåskjenn	Norway	Team Jayco–AlUla	24	55	+ 1h 05' 56"	
163	Nina Kessler	Netherlands	Team Jayco–AlUla	34	89	+ 1h 33' 32"	
164	Letizia Paternoster	Italy	Team Jayco–AlUla	23	56	+ 1h 07' 15"	
165	Ruby Roseman-Gannon	Australia	Team Jayco–AlUla	24	25	+ 31' 34"	
166	Ane Santesteban	Spain	Team Jayco–AlUla	32	10	+ 9' 12"	
167	Urška Žigart	Slovenia	Team Jayco–AlUla	26	DNF-6	–	
171	Teuntje Beekhuis	Netherlands	Team Jumbo–Visma	27	87	+ 1h 32' 02"	
172	Maud Oudeman ‡	Netherlands	Team Jumbo–Visma	19	93	+ 1h 36' 12"	
173	Linda Riedmann ‡	Germany	Team Jumbo–Visma	20	86	+ 1h 31' 18"	
174	Noemi Rüegg ‡	Switzerland	Team Jumbo–Visma	22	34	+ 41' 50"	
175	Karlijn Swinkels	Netherlands	Team Jumbo–Visma	24	85	+ 1h 30' 57"	
176	Fem van Empel ‡	Netherlands	Team Jumbo–Visma	20	11	+ 10' 44"	
177	Marianne Vos	Netherlands	Team Jumbo–Visma	36	48	+ 57' 56"	
181	Emma Bernardi ‡	Italy	Team Mendelspeck	19	DNF-8	–	
182	Alice Capasso ‡	Italy	Team Mendelspeck	20	110	+ 1h 54' 49"	
183	Monica Castagna ‡	Italy	Team Mendelspeck	20	102	+ 1h 44' 51"	
184	Angela Oro ‡	Italy	Team Mendelspeck	21	90	+ 1h 35' 02"	
185	Francesca Pisciali	Italy	Team Mendelspeck	25	DNF-9	–	
186	Beatrice Pozzobon ‡	Italy	Team Mendelspeck	22	125	+ 2h 13' 11"	
187	Francesca Tommasi	Italy	Team Mendelspeck	24	37	+ 44' 53"	
191	Niamh Fisher-Black	New Zealand	SD Worx	22	9	+ 7' 28"	
192	Barbara Guarischi	Italy	SD Worx	32	101	+ 1h 41' 40"	
193	Femke Markus	Netherlands	SD Worx	26	129	+ 2h 32' 55"	
194	Anna Shackley ‡	Great Britain	SD Worx	22	13	+ 12' 38"	
195	Elena Cecchini	Italy	SD Worx	31	DNS-7	–	
196	Blanka Vas ‡	Hungary	SD Worx	21	43	+ 49' 55"	
197	Lorena Wiebes	Netherlands	SD Worx	24	DNS-7	–	
201	Giorgia Bariani	Italy	Top Girls Fassa Bortolo	22	113	+ 1h 56' 01"	
202	Alessia Missiaggia	Italy	Top Girls Fassa Bortolo	23	100	+ 1h 53' 05"	
203	Iris Monticolo	Italy	Top Girls Fassa Bortolo	22	114	+ 1h 56' 57"	
204	Alice Palazzi ‡	Italy	Top Girls Fassa Bortolo	21	67	+ 1h 17' 44"	
205	Chiara Reghini ‡	Italy	Top Girls Fassa Bortolo	20	112	+ 1h 55' 31"	
206	Cristina Tonetti ‡	Italy	Top Girls Fassa Bortolo	20	103	+ 1h 44' 59"	
207	Alessia Vigilia	Italy	Top Girls Fassa Bortolo	23	33	+ 40' 30"	
211	Elynor Bäckstedt	Great Britain	Lidl–Trek	21	116	+ 1h 58' 45"	
212	Elizabeth Deignan	Great Britain	Lidl–Trek	34	38	+ 45' 34"	
213	Lauretta Hanson	Australia	Lidl–Trek	28	31	+ 38' 21"	
214	Lisa Klein	Germany	Lidl–Trek	26	DNF-7	–	
215	Elisa Longo Borghini	Italy	Lidl–Trek	31	DNS-6	–	
216	Gaia Realini ‡	Italy	Lidl–Trek	22	3	+ 4' 23"	
217	Shirin van Anrooij ‡	Netherlands	Lidl–Trek	21	29	+ 33' 36"	
221	Marta Bastianelli	Italy	UAE Team ADQ	36	59	+ 1h 09' 15"	
222	Sofia Bertizzolo	Italy	UAE Team ADQ	25	57	+ 1h 08' 43"	
223	Chiara Consonni	Italy	UAE Team ADQ	24	91	+ 1h 35' 33"	
224	Karolina Kumięga	Poland	UAE Team ADQ	24	62	+ 1h 12' 08"	
225	Mikayla Harvey	New Zealand	UAE Team ADQ	24	68	+ 1h 18' 00"	
226	Erica Magnaldi	Italy	UAE Team ADQ	30	5	+ 5' 34"	
227	Silvia Persico	Italy	UAE Team ADQ	25	8	+ 6' 59"	
231	Anniina Ahtosalo ‡	Finland	Uno-X Pro Cycling Team	19	124	+ 2h 10' 57"	
232	Susanne Andersen	Norway	Uno-X Pro Cycling Team	24	73	+ 1h 19' 48"	
233	Elinor Barker	Great Britain	Uno-X Pro Cycling Team	28	58	+ 1h 09' 07"	
234	Maria Giulia Confalonieri	Italy	Uno-X Pro Cycling Team	30	81	+ 1h 26' 14"	
235	Amalie Dideriksen	Denmark	Uno-X Pro Cycling Team	27	121	+ 2h 03' 30"	
236	Anouska Koster	Netherlands	Uno-X Pro Cycling Team	29	22	+ 28' 57"	
237	Hannah Ludwig	Germany	Uno-X Pro Cycling Team	23	49	+ 1h 00' 03"	

=== By team ===
(Spain) Movistar Team (MOV)
No.	Rider	Pos.
1	Annemiek van Vleuten (NED)	1
2	Aude Biannic (FRA)	104
3	Sheyla Gutiérrez (ESP)	118
4	Liane Lippert (GER)	16
5	Floortje Mackaij (NED)	41
6	Sara Martín (ESP)	83
7	Paula Andrea Patiño (COL)	18

(Belgium) AG Insurance–Soudal–Quick-Step (AGS)
No.	Rider	Pos.
11	Justine Ghekiere (BEL)	24
12	Marthe Goossens (BEL)	61
13	Britt Knaven (BEL)	DNS-5
14	Gaia Masetti (ITA)	45
15	Ilse Pluimers (NED)	70
16	Ally Wollaston (NZL)	46
17	Maud Rijnbeek (NED)	64

(Italy) Aromitalia–Basso Bikes–Vaiano (VAI)
No.	Rider	Pos.
21	Irene Affolati (ITA)	120
22	Lara Scarselli (ITA)	DNF-6
23	Francesca Baroni (ITA)	98
24	Fanny Bonini (ITA)	128
25	Milena del Sarto (ITA)	DNF-9
26	Rasa Leleivytė (LTU)	75
27	Ainhoa Moreno (ESP)	DNF-4

(Italy) Bepink (BPK)
No.	Rider	Pos.
31	Andrea Casagranda (ITA)	123
32	Valentina Basilico (ITA)	96
33	Karolina Karasiewicz (POL)	OTL-5
34	Prisca Savi (ITA)	127
35	Giorgia Vettorello (ITA)	66
36	Matilde Vitillo (ITA)	78
37	Silvia Zanardi (ITA)	54

(Spain) Bizkaia–Durango (BDU)
No.	Rider	Pos.
41	Lucía González (ESP)	71
42	Ana Vitória Magalhães (BRA)	DNS-4
43	Sandra Gutierrez (ESP)	132
44	Irene Mendez (ESP)	119
45	Beatriz Pereira (POR)	133
46	Sofia Rodríguez (ESP)	DNF-9
47	Catalina Anais Soto (CHI)	DNF-9

(Italy) Born To Win-Zhiraf-G20 (BTW)
No.	Rider	Pos.
51	Sofia Barbieri (ITA)	DNF-3
52	Sara Casasola (ITA)	DNF-8
53	Lea Fuchs (SUI)	106
54	Nika Myalitsina	DNF-5
55	Yana Myalitsina	100
56	Vanessa Santeliz (VEN)	OTL-5
57	Ella Simpson (AUS)	DNF-3

(Germany) Canyon//SRAM (CSR)
No.	Rider	Pos.
61	Neve Bradbury (AUS)	DNF-9
62	Tiffany Cromwell (AUS)	63
63	Chloé Dygert (USA)	32
64	Antonia Niedermaier (GER)	DNF-6
65	Soraya Paladin (ITA)	27
66	Pauliena Rooijakkers (NED)	12
67	Sarah Roy (AUS)	39

(United States) EF Education–Tibco–SVB (TIB)
No.	Rider	Pos.
71	Elizabeth Banks (GBR)	99
72	Letizia Borghesi (ITA)	40
73	Veronica Ewers (USA)	4
74	Kathrin Hammes (GER)	DNS-4
75	Lauren Stephens (USA)	47
76	Magdeleine Vallieres (CAN)	DNF-9
77	Georgia Williams (NZL)	42

(France) FDJ–Suez (FST)
No.	Rider	Pos.
81	Marta Cavalli (ITA)	14
82	Eugénie Duval (FRA)	74
83	Victorie Guilman (FRA)	21
84	Marie Le Net (FRA)	44
85	Cecilie Uttrup Ludwig (DEN)	6
86	Évita Muzic (FRA)	17
87	Gladys Verhulst (FRA)	60

(Belgium) Fenix–Deceuninck (FED)
No.	Rider	Pos.
91	Maria Martins (POR)	DNF-4
92	Greta Marturano (ITA)	20
93	Carina Schrempf (AUT)	69
94	Petra Stiasny (SUI)	23
95	Inge van der Heijden (NED)	35
96	Annemarie Worst (NED)	92
97	Sophie Wright (GBR)	84

(Italy) GB Junior Team Piemonte (GBJ)
No.	Rider	Pos.
101	Noemi Lucrezia Eremita (ITA)	97
102	Monia Garavaglia (ITA)	131
103	Giulia Giuliani (ITA)	126
104	Vittoria Ruffilli (ITA)	OTL-5
105	Gemma Sernissi (ITA)	117
106	Sylvie Truc (ITA)	OTL-5
107	Elisa Valtulini (ITA)	DNS-4

(United States) Human Powered Health (HPW)
No.	Rider	Pos.
111	Nina Buijsman (NED)	26
112	Audrey Cordon-Ragot (FRA)	52
113	Barbara Malcotti (ITA)	19
114	Daria Pikulik (POL)	DNF-6
115	Marit Raaijmakers (NED)	94
116	Lily Williams (USA)	80
117	Eri Yonamine (JPN)	82

(Italy) Isolmant–Premac–Vittoria (SBT)
No.	Rider	Pos.
121	Carlotta Borello (ITA)	130
122	Carmela Cipriani (ITA)	76
123	Valeria Curnis (ITA)	DNF-3
124	Beatrice Rossato (ITA)	65
125	Emanuela Zanetti (ITA)	OTL-5
126	Asia Zontone (ITA)	122

(Switzerland) Israel Premier Tech Roland (CGS)
No.	Rider	Pos.
131	Maggie Coles-Lyster (CAN)	DNS-5
132	Sofia Collinelli (ITA)	DNS-8
133	Anna Kiesenhofer (AUT)	53
134	Silvia Magri (ITA)	115
135	Thị Thật Nguyễn (VIE)	DNF-8
136	Elena Pirrone (ITA)	36
137	Elizabeth Stannard (AUS)	28

(Netherlands) Liv Racing TeqFind (DSB)
No.	Rider	Pos.
141	Rachele Barbieri (ITA)	95
142	Valerie Demey (BEL)	108
143	Mavi García (ESP)	7
144	Marta Jaskulska (POL)	77
145	Tereza Neumanová (CZE)	72
146	Katia Ragusa (ITA)	107
147	Quinty Ton (NED)	50

(Netherlands) Team dsm–firmenich (DSM)
No.	Rider	Pos.
151	Francesca Barale (ITA)	30
152	Eleonora Ciabocco (ITA)	79
153	Megan Jastrab (USA)	88
154	Franziska Koch (GER)	105
155	Juliette Labous (FRA)	2
156	Esmée Peperkamp (NED)	15
157	Becky Storrie (GBR)	51

(Australia) Team Jayco–AlUla (JAY)
No.	Rider	Pos.
161	Georgia Baker (AUS)	111
162	Ingvild Gåskjenn (NOR)	55
163	Nina Kessler (NED)	89
164	Letizia Paternoster (ITA)	56
165	Ruby Roseman-Gannon (AUS)	25
166	Ane Santesteban (ESP)	10
167	Urška Žigart (SLO)	DNF-6

(Netherlands) Team Jumbo–Visma (JVW)
No.	Rider	Pos.
171	Teuntje Beekhuis (NED)	87
172	Maud Oudeman (NED)	93
173	Linda Riedmann (GER)	86
174	Noemi Rüegg (SUI)	34
175	Karlijn Swinkels (NED)	85
176	Fem van Empel (NED)	11
177	Marianne Vos (NED)	48

(Italy) Team Mendelspeck (MDS)
No.	Rider	Pos.
181	Emma Bernardi (ITA)	DNF-8
182	Alice Capasso (ITA)	110
183	Monica Castagna (ITA)	102
184	Angela Oro (ITA)	90
185	Francesca Pisciali (ITA)	DNF-9
186	Beatrice Pozzobon (ITA)	125
187	Francesca Tommasi (ITA)	37

(Netherlands) SD Worx (SDW)
No.	Rider	Pos.
191	Niamh Fisher-Black (NZL)	9
192	Barbara Guarischi (ITA)	101
193	Femke Markus (NED)	129
194	Anna Shackley (GBR)	13
195	Elena Cecchini (ITA)	DNS-7
196	Blanka Vas (HUN)	43
197	Lorena Wiebes (NED)	DNS-7

(Italy) Top Girls Fassa Bortolo (TOP)
No.	Rider	Pos.
201	Giorgia Bariani (ITA)	113
202	Alessia Missiaggia (ITA)	109
203	Iris Monticolo (ITA)	114
204	Alice Palazzi (ITA)	67
205	Chiara Reghini (ITA)	112
206	Cristina Tonetti (ITA)	103
207	Alessia Vigilia (ITA)	33

(United States) Lidl–Trek (TFS)
No.	Rider	Pos.
211	Elynor Bäckstedt (GBR)	116
212	Elizabeth Deignan (GBR)	38
213	Lauretta Hanson (AUS)	31
214	Lisa Klein (GER)	DNF-7
215	Elisa Longo Borghini (ITA)	DNS-6
216	Gaia Realini (ITA)	3
217	Shirin van Anrooij (NED)	29

(United Arab Emirates) UAE Team ADQ (UAD)
No.	Rider	Pos.
221	Marta Bastianelli (ITA)	59
222	Sofia Bertizzolo (ITA)	57
223	Chiara Consonni (ITA)	91
224	Karolina Kumięga (POL)	62
225	Mikayla Harvey (NZL)	68
226	Erica Magnaldi (ITA)	5
227	Silvia Persico (ITA)	8

(Norway) Uno-X Pro Cycling Team (UXT)
No.	Rider	Pos.
231	Anniina Ahtosalo (FIN)	124
232	Susanne Andersen (NOR)	73
233	Elinor Barker (GBR)	58
234	Maria Giulia Confalonieri (ITA)	81
235	Amalie Dideriksen (DEN)	121
236	Anouska Koster (NED)	22
237	Hannah Ludwig (GER)	49

=== By nationality ===
Country	No. of riders	Finished	Stage wins
Australia	8	6	
Austria	2	2	
Belgium	4	3	
Brazil	1	0	
Canada	2	0	
Chile	1	0	
Colombia	1	1	
Czechia	1	1	
Denmark	2	2	
Finland	1	1	
France	8	8	
Germany	7	4	1 (Antonia Niedermaier)
Great Britain	7	7	
Hungary	1	1	1 (Blanka Vas)
Italy	64	50	2 (Chiara Consonni, Elisa Longo Borghini)
Japan	1	1	
Lithuania	1	1	
Netherlands	21	20	4 (Annemiek van Vleuten x3, Lorena Wiebes)
New Zealand	4	4	
Norway	2	2	
Poland	4	2	
Portugal	2	1	
Slovenia	1	0	
Spain	9	7	
Switzerland	3	3	
United States	5	5	
Venezuela	1	0	
Vietnam	1	0	
	2	1	
Total	167	133	8
