= Debora Silvestri =

Italian cyclist

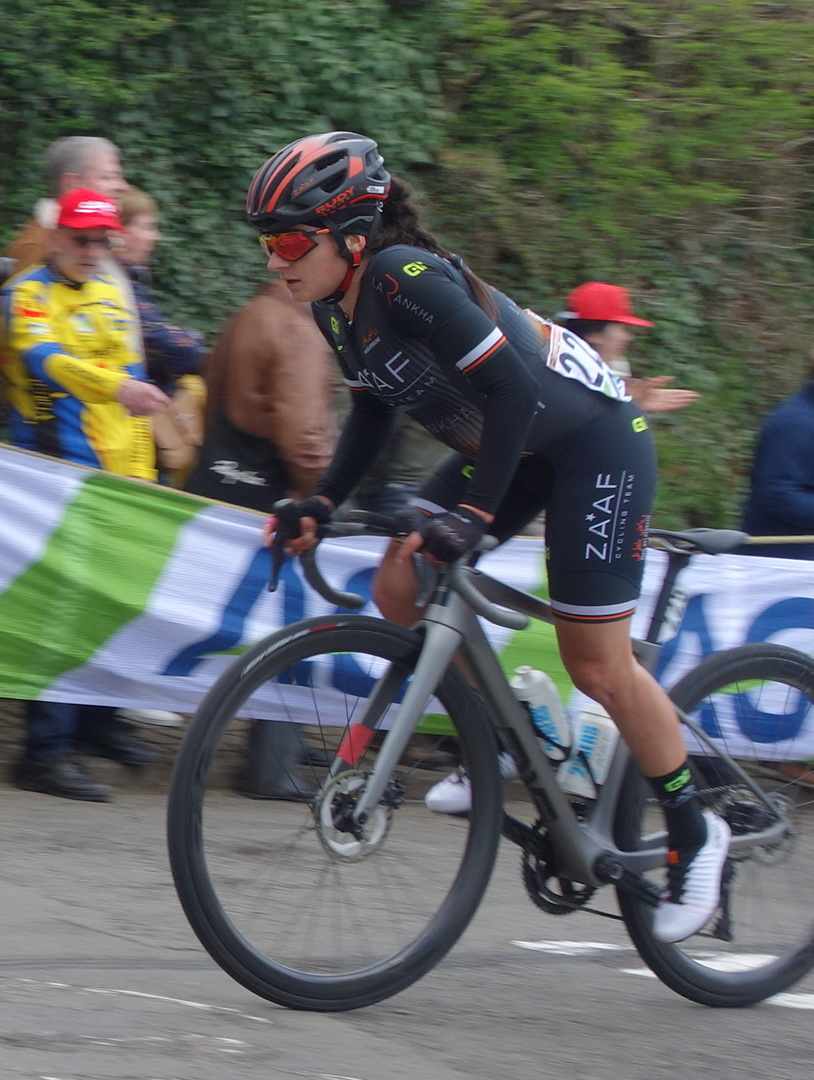
- Silvestri at the 2023 La Flèche Wallonne

Personal information
- Full name: Debora Silvestri
- Born: 8 May 1998 (age 28)

Cycling career
- Sport: Cycling
- Current team: Laboral Kutxa–Fundación Euskadi
- Discipline: Road
- Role: Rider

Professional teams
- 2018–2019: Eurotarget–Bianchi–Vitasana
- 2020–2022: Top Girls Fassa Bortolo
- 2023: Zaaf Cycling Team
- 2023–2024: Laboral Kutxa–Fundación Euskadi

Debora Silvestri (born 8 May 1998) is an Italian professional racing cyclist, who currently rides for UCI Women's Continental Team Laboral Kutxa–Fundación Euskadi.

== Major results ==
2018
7th Road race, National Road Championships
10th GP Liberazione
2020
9th Giro dell'Emilia Internazionale Donne Elite
2021
3rd Grand Prix Féminin de Chambéry
3rd Overall Giro della Toscana Femminile
4th Overall Setmana Ciclista Valenciana
2022
1st Mountains classification Festival Elsy Jacobs
6th GP Liberazione
2023
5th Overall Vuelta Ciclista Andalucia Ruta Del Sol
7th Overall Gran Premio Ciudad de Eibar
