= 2013 Grand Prix GSB =

Race details
- Dates: 7 March 2013
- Distance: 97 km (60.27 mi)

Results
	Winner	Clemilda Fernandes Silva (BRA)	
	Second	Alena Amialiusik (BLR)	(Bepink)
	Third	Noemi Cantele (ITA)	(Bepink)

The 2013 Grand Prix GSB was a one-day women's cycle race in the Grand Prix GSB series held in El Salvador on March 7, 2013. It ran from Plaza El Salvador del Mundo (The Savior of the World Plaza) in San Salvador City to Juayúa over 97 km (60 mi) and has an UCI rating of 1.1. The race was won by the Brazilian Clemilda Fernandes Silva, beating the Be Pink pairing of Alena Amialiusik and Noemi Cantele.

Result

	Rider	Team	Time
1	Clemilda Fernandes Silva (BRA)		3h 18' 55"
2	Alena Amialiusik (BLR)	Bepink	s.t.
3	Noemi Cantele (ITA)	Bepink	+ 15"
4	Inga Čilvinaitė (LTU)	Pasta Zara–Cogeas	+ 15"
5	Ana Sanabria (COL)		+ 18"
6	Lorena María Vargas (COL)	Pasta Zara–Cogeas	+ 42"
7	Evelyn García (ESA)	Pasta Zara–Cogeas	+ 1' 57"
8	Ruth Winder (USA)		+ 2' 34"
9	Ana Fagua (COL)		+ 2' 35"
10	Sérika Mitchell Gulumá (COL)	Vaiano–Fondriest	+ 2' 35"
