= Cycling at the 2023 Pan American Games – Women's madison =

Women's madison at the 2023 Pan American Games
- Venue: Velodrome
- Dates: October 27
- Competitors: 16 from 8 nations

Medalists
Gold medal	Lina Hernández; Lina Rojas	Colombia
Silver medal	Lizbeth Salazar; Antonieta Gaxiola	Mexico
Bronze medal	Chloe Patrick; Colleen Gulick	United States

The women's madison competition of the cycling events at the 2023 Pan American Games was held from October 27 at the Velodrome in Santiago, Chile.

== Schedule ==
Date	Time	Round
October 27, 2023	10:42	Final

== Results ==
The final classification is determined in the medal finals.

Rank	Name	Nation	Laps points	Sprint points	Total points
1st place, gold medalist(s)	Lina Hernández; Lina Rojas	Colombia	0	46	46
2nd place, silver medalist(s)	Lizbeth Salazar; Antonieta Gaxiola	Mexico	0	0	42
3rd place, bronze medalist(s)	Chloe Patrick; Colleen Gulick	United States	0	0	30
4	Alice Leite de Melo; Wellyda Dos Santos	Brazil	0	0	13
5	Irma Greve; Maribel Aguirre	Argentina	0	0	5
6	Scarlet Cortés; Paola Muñoz	Chile	-20	4	-16
	Devaney Collier; Ngaire Barraclough	Canada	-20	3	DNF
	Angie González; Verónica Abreu	Venezuela	0	0	DNF
