= Jessenia Meneses =

Colombian cyclist (born 1995)

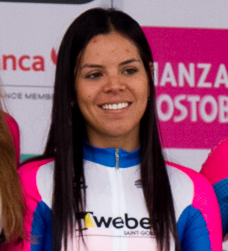
- Meneses in 2017

Personal information
- Full name: Jessenia Alejandra Meneses González
- Born: 18 June 1995 (age 31) Medellín, Colombia
- Height: 1.56 m (5 ft 1 in)

Cycling career
- Sport: Cycling
- Current team: Laboral Kutxa–Fundación Euskadi
- Discipline: Road
- Role: Rider

Amateur teams
- 2012–2013: Nueva Generación
- 2021: Colombia Tierra de Atletas–GW Bicicletas

Professional teams
- 2014: 4-72 Colombia
- 2015: Forno D'Asolo–Astute
- 2016–2018: Weber Shimano Ladies Power
- 2019: Team Illuminate
- 2022–2023: Colombia Tierra de Atletas–GW–Shimano
- 2024–: Laboral Kutxa–Fundación Euskadi

Jessenia Alejandra Meneses González (born 18 June 1995) is a Colombian racing cyclist, who currently rides for UCI Women's Continental Team Laboral Kutxa–Fundación Euskadi. She rode at the 2014 UCI Road World Championships.
