= Lina Svarinska =

Latvian cyclist

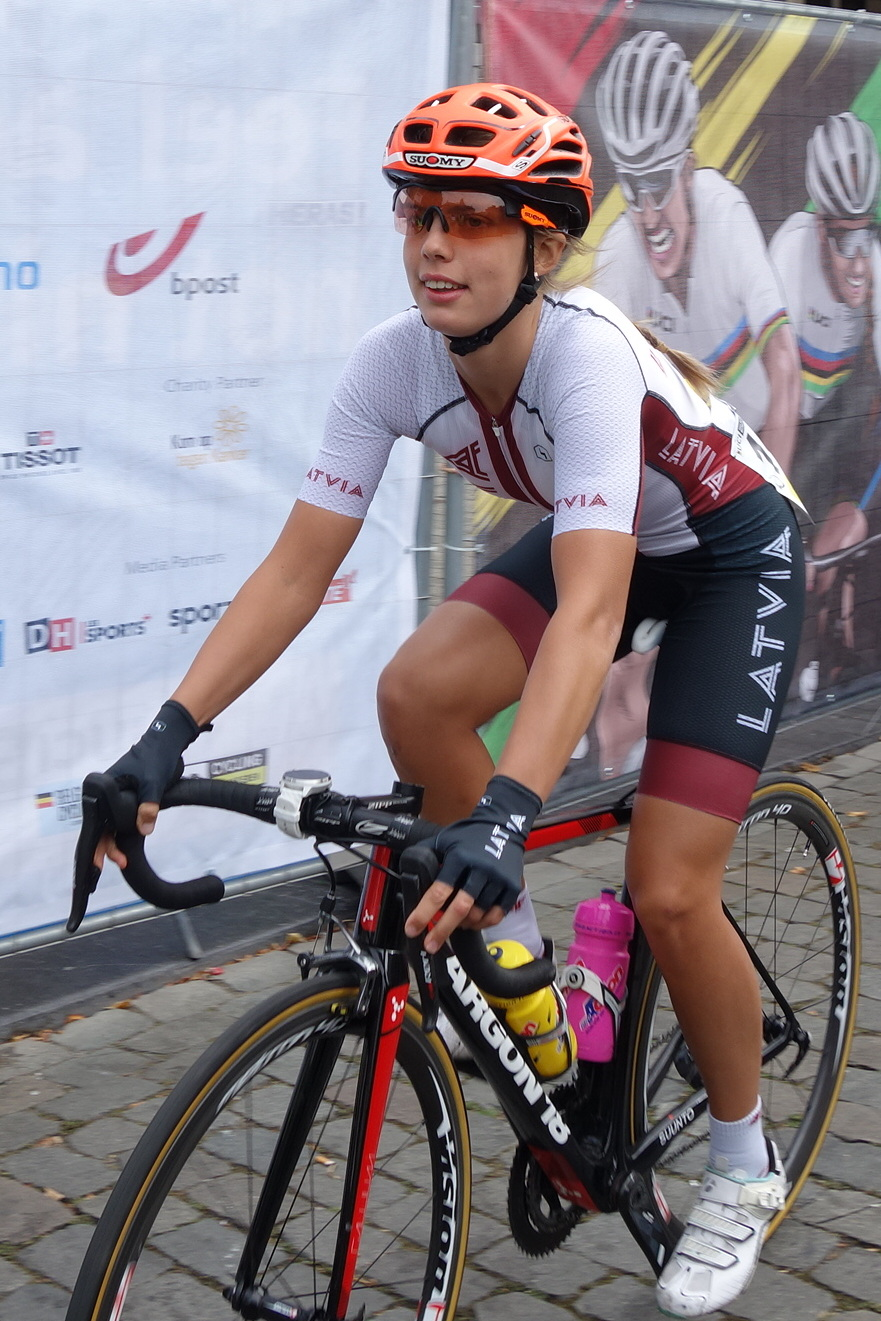
- Svarinska at the 2021 World Championships

Personal information
- Full name: Lina Svarinska
- Born: 15 March 2001 (age 25)

Cycling career
- Sport: Cycling
- Discipline: Road
- Role: Rider

Amateur team
- 2018–2019: Belo Cycling Project

Professional teams
- 2020: Eurotarget–Bianchi–Vittoria
- 2021: Servetto–Makhymo–Beltrami TSA
- 2022-2023: Team Farto BTC

Lina Svarinska (born 15 March 2001) is a former Latvian professional racing cyclist In August 2020, she rode in the 2020 Strade Bianche Women's race in Italy.

Her first coach was ex-professional Latvian cyclist Raivis Belohvoščiks
