= Ana Sanabria =

Colombian cyclist (born 1990)

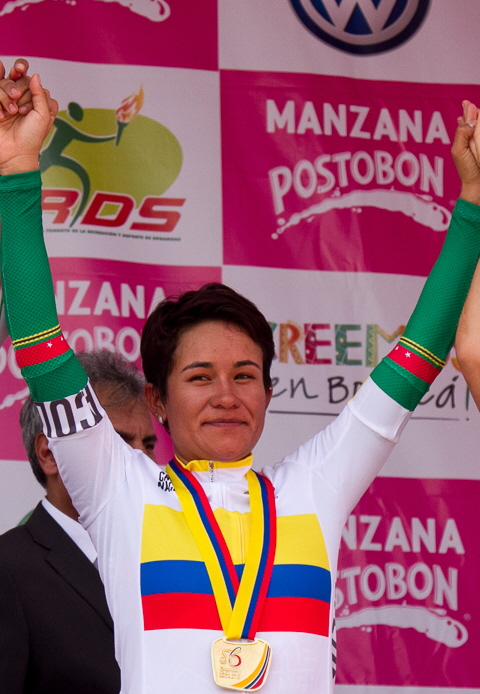
- Sanabria in 2016.

Personal information
- Full name: Ana Cristina Sanabria Sánchez
- Born: 2 May 1990 (age 36) Zapatoca, Colombia

Cycling career
- Sport: Cycling
- Current team: Colombia Tierra de Atletas–GW–Shimano
- Discipline: Road
- Role: Rider

Amateur teams
- 2010–2013: Formesan–Panachi–InderSantander
- 2014–2016: Bogotá Humana–Solgar Vitaminas
- 2020–2021: Colombia Tierra de Atletas

Professional teams
- 2014: Bizkaia–Durango
- 2017–2018: Servetto Giusta
- 2019: Swapit–Agolíco
- 2022–: Colombia Tierra de Atletas–GW–Shimano

Major wins
- One day races & Classics National Time Trial Championships (2015–2017, 2020)
Medal record
Women's road cycling
Representing Colombia
Pan American Championships
Silver medal – second place	2016 San Cristóbal	Time trial
Bronze medal – third place	2018 San Juan	Time trial

Ana Cristina Sanabria Sánchez (born 2 May 1990) is a Colombian professional racing cyclist, who rides for UCI Women's Continental Team Colombia Tierra de Atletas–GW–Shimano. She won the Colombian National Time Trial Championships four times (from 2015 to 2017 and 2020), and the Vuelta a Colombia Femenina Oro y Paz in 2016 and 2017.

== Major results ==
2009
10th Time trial, National Road Championships
2010
National Road Championships

2nd Road race
5th Time trial

8th Overall Vuelta Femenino del Porvenir
2011
1st Overall Clasica Alcaldia de Anapoima

1st Stage 2

3rd Overall Vuelta a Cundinamarca
4th Overall Vuelta Femenino del Porvenir
7th Time trial, National Road Championships
2012
1st Overall Vuelta a Cundinamarca

1st Stages 2 & 4

2nd Overall Vuelta Femenino del Porvenir
National Road Championships

3rd Road race
6th Time trial

2013
4th Overall Clasica Ciudad de Bogota
4th Overall Vuelta Femenino del Porvenir
5th Overall Vuelta a El Salvador
5th Grand Prix GSB
10th Road race, National Road Championships
10th Grand Prix de Oriente
2014
1st Overall Vuelta Femenino del Porvenir

1st Stages 4 (ITT) & 5

4th Overall Clasica Ciudad de Soacha
5th Time trial, National Road Championships
2015
National Road Championships

1st Time trial
3rd Road race

1st Overall Vuelta al Oriente Antioqueño

1st Stage 3 (ITT)

1st Overall Vuelta Al Tolima

1st Stages 1 & 2

1st Overall Clasica Ciudad de Soacha

1st Stage 2

1st Overall Vuelta Femenino del Porvenir

1st Stages 2 (ITT) & 4

2nd Overall Vuelta a Boyacá
3rd Overall Vuelta al Valle del Cauca
3rd Overall Vuelta a Cundinamarca
2016
National Road Championships

1st Time trial
4th Road race

1st Overall Vuelta a Colombia Femenina

1st Stages 1 (ITT) & 4

1st Overall Clasica Alcaldia de Anapoima
1st Overall Vuelta a Boyacá

1st Stage 2 (ITT)

1st Overall Clasica Ciudad de Soacha

1st Stages 1 & 3

1st Overall Vuelta Femenino del Porvenir

1st Stage 2

Pan American Road Championships

2nd Time trial
7th Road race

2nd Overall Vuelta a Cundinamarca
5th Overall Vuelta Al Tolima
6th Overall Tour Femenino de San Luis
2017
1st Time trial, National Road Championships
1st Overall Vuelta a Colombia Femenina

1st Prologue, Stages 3 & 5

1st Overall Clasica Alcaldia de Anapoima

1st Stage 3

1st Overall Vuelta Al Tolima

1st Stages 1 & 2

1st Overall Clásica de El Carmen de Viboral

1st Stage 3

1st Overall Vuelta Femenino del Porvenir

1st Stages 1 & 4

1st Stage 1 Vuelta a Cundinamarca
2nd Time trial, Bolivarian Games
4th Time trial, Pan American Road Championships
8th La Course by Le Tour de France
2018
South American Games

1st Road race
1st Time trial

1st Overall Vuelta a Colombia Femenina

1st Stage 3 (ITT)

1st Overall Vuelta a Boyacá

1st Stage 3 (ITT)

2nd Time trial, Central American and Caribbean Games
3rd Time trial, Pan American Road Championships
3rd Overall Clasica Esteban Chaves

1st Stage 3

2019
2nd Time trial, National Road Championships
7th Overall Vuelta a Colombia Femenina
2020
1st Time trial, National Road Championships
2021
2nd Time trial, National Road Championships
2022
3rd Road race, Bolivarian Games
