= Paula Patiño =

Colombian cyclist (born 1997)

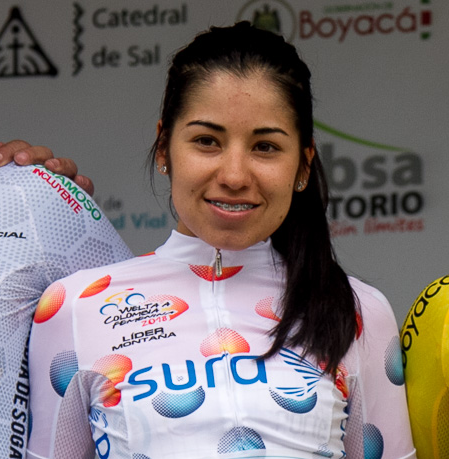
- Patiño in 2018

Personal information
- Full name: Paula Andrea Patiño Bedoya
- Born: 29 March 1997 (age 29) La Ceja, Antioquia, Colombia

Cycling career
- Sport: Cycling
- Current team: Movistar Team
- Disciplines: Road; Track
- Role: Rider

Amateur team
- 2018: World Cycling Centre

Professional team
- 2019–: Movistar Team
Medal record
Women's road cycling
Representing Colombia
Pan American Championships
Silver medal – second place	2019 Pachuca	Under-23 road race

Paula Andrea Patiño Bedoya (born 29 March 1997) is a Colombian racing cyclist, who currently rides for UCI Women's WorldTeam Movistar Team. She rode in the women's road race event at the 2018 UCI Road World Championships.

Patiño won Stage 2 of the Vuelta a Colombia Femenina in 2018.

She competed at the 2020 Summer Olympics.

== Major results ==
2017
1st Stage 4 Vuelta a Colombia Femenina
2018
4th Grand Prix de Plumelec-Morbihan Dames
5th Kreiz Breizh Elites Dames
6th Overall Vuelta a Colombia Femenina

1st Stage 2

2019
5th Road Race Pan American Road Championships
2020
8th Overall Giro d'Italia Internazionale Femminile
2021
National Road Championships

2nd Road race
7th Time trial

2022
3rd Tour Cycliste Féminin International de l'Ardèche
4th Overall Vuelta Ciclista Andalucia
6th Gran Premio Ciudad de Eibar
9th Overall Itzulia Women
2023
2nd Road race, National Road Championships
2024
1st Road race, National Road Championships
