= Grote Prijs Yvonne Reynders =

Belgian one-day road cycling race

Race details
- Date: August
- Region: Herentals, Belgium
- Discipline: Road
- Web site: www.gpyvonnereynders.be

History
- First edition: 2022
- Editions: 4 (as of 2025)
- First winner: Eline van Rooijen (NED)
- Most recent: Cristina Tonetti (ITA)

The Grote Prijs Yvonne Reynders is an elite women's professional one-day road bicycle race held annually in Herentals, Belgium. The event was first held in 2022, but was cut short that year due to poor weather. It is currently rated by the UCI as a 1.1 category race, upgrading from 1.2 status in 2024.

The race is named for former professional cyclist Yvonne Reynders.

== Past winners ==
Year	Country	Rider	Team
2022	No race due to Cut short after 2 laps of the course due to flooding and heavy rain.		
2023	Netherlands	Eline van Rooijen	AG Insurance–NXTG U23 Team
2024	Netherlands	Scarlett Souren	VolkerWessels Women Cyclingteam
2025	Italy	Cristina Tonetti	Laboral Kutxa–Fundación Euskadi
