= Silvia Magri =

Italian cyclist

Personal information
- Full name: Silvia Magri
- Born: 17 October 2000 (age 25)

Cycling career
- Sport: Cycling
- Discipline: Road
- Role: Rider

Professional teams
- 2019: Bepink
- 2020–2021: Valcar–Travel & Service
- 2022: Born to Win G20 Ambedo
- 2023: Israel Premier Tech Roland
- 2024: Team Komugi–Grand Est

Silvia Magri (born 17 October 2000) is an Italian professional racing cyclist, who most recently rode for UCI Women's Continental Team Team Komugi–Grand Est.

== Major results ==
2022
5th Trofeo Oro in Euro–Women's Bike Race
