= Colombia Potencia de la Vida–Strongman Femenino =

Colombian cycling team

Team information
- UCI code: CTA (2020–)
- Registered: Colombia
- Founded: 2020
- Discipline: Road
- Status: National (2020–2021); UCI Women's Continental Team (2021–)

Team name history
- 2020 2021 2022 2023 2024–: Colombia Tierra De Atletas; Colombia Tierra De Atletas–GW; Colombia Tierra de Atletas–GW–Shimano; Colombia Pacto Por El Deporte–GW–Shimano; Colombia Potencia de la Vida–Strongman Femenino

Colombia Potencia de la Vida–Strongman Femenino is a Colombian-based women's road cycling team that was founded in 2020.

== Major results ==
2021
Overall Vuelta Femenina a Guatemala, Lorena Colmenares

Stages 1 & 3, Lorena Colmenares
Stages 2 & 5, Jannie Salcedo

2022
Overall Clasica Ciudad de Huaca, Lorena Colmenares

Stages 1 (ITT) & 3, Lorena Colmenares

Stage 1 Vuelta Costa Rica, Mariana Herrera
Stage 5 Vuelta a Colombia Femenina, Estefania Herrera

2023
Grand Tour de Ciclismo de SC Femenina, Paula Andrea Carrasco
GP Urubici de Ciclismo Femenina, Vanesa Martinez
GP de Santa Catarina, Elizabeth Castaño

== National champions ==
2020
Colombia Time Trial, Ana Sanabria

2021
Pan American Road Race, Lina Hernández
Colombia Road Race, Lorena Colmenares

2022
Colombia Time Trial, Lina Hernández
Colombia U23 Time Trial, Mariana Herrera
