= Lina Hernández =

Colombian cyclist (born 1999)

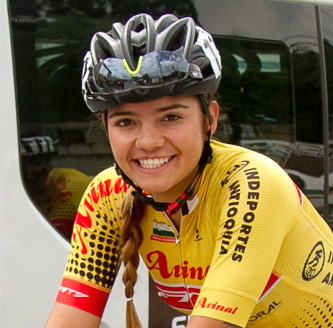
- Hernández in 2018

Personal information
- Full name: Lina Marcela Hernández Gómez
- Born: 4 January 1999 (age 27) El Carmen de Viboral, Colombia

Cycling career
- Sport: Cycling
- Current team: Colombia Potencia de la Vida–Strongman Femenino
- Disciplines: Road; Track
- Role: Rider

Amateur teams
- 2018–2019: Avinal–GW–Carmen de Viboral
- 2020: Colnago CM Team
- 2021: Colombia Tierra de Atletas

Professional team
- 2022–: Colombia Tierra de Atletas–GW–Shimano

Major wins
- One-day races and Classics Pan American Road Race Championships (2021) National Time Trial Championships (2022, 2023)
Medal record
Representing Colombia
Women's track cycling
Event	1st	2nd	3rd
Nations Cup stage	0	0	3
Pan American Games	1	1	2
Pan American Championships	5	3	3
CAC Games	2	0	1
South American Games	6	0	0
Bolivarian Games	2	1	0
Junior Pan American Games	2	1	0
Total	18	6	9
Pan American Games
Gold medal – first place	2023 Santiago	Madison
Silver medal – second place	2023 Santiago	Omnium
Bronze medal – third place	2019 Lima	Team pursuit
Bronze medal – third place	2023 Santiago	Team pursuit
Pan American Championships
Gold medal – first place	2021 Lima	Elimination
Gold medal – first place	2021 Lima	Individual pursuit
Gold medal – first place	2021 Lima	Omnium
Gold medal – first place	2021 Lima	Team pursuit
Gold medal – first place	2025 Asunción	Madison
Silver medal – second place	2024 Carson	Omnium
Silver medal – second place	2024 Carson	Madison
Silver medal – second place	2025 Asunción	Omnium
Bronze medal – third place	2018 Aguascalientes	Omnium
Bronze medal – third place	2019 Cochabamba	Points race
Bronze medal – third place	2025 Asunción	Team pursuit
Central American and Caribbean Games
Gold medal – first place	2026 Santo Domingo	Madison
Gold medal – first place	2026 Santo Domingo	Team pursuit
Bronze medal – third place	2026 Santo Domingo	Omnium
South American Games
Gold medal – first place	2022 Asunción	Omnium
Gold medal – first place	2022 Asunción	Madison
Gold medal – first place	2022 Asunción	Team pursuit
Gold medal – first place	2026 Santa Fe	Omnium
Gold medal – first place	2026 Santa Fe	Madison
Gold medal – first place	2026 Santa Fe	Team pursuit
Bolivarian Games
Gold medal – first place	2025 Lima-Ayacucho	Omnium
Gold medal – first place	2025 Lima-Ayacucho	Madison
Silver medal – second place	2025 Lima-Ayacucho	Team pursuit
Junior Pan American Games
Gold medal – first place	2021 Cali-Valle	Omnium
Gold medal – first place	2021 Cali-Valle	Team pursuit
Silver medal – second place	2021 Cali-Valle	Madison
Women's road cycling
Event	1st	2nd	3rd
Pan American Championships	1	2	0
South American Games	0	3	0
Bolivarian Games	0	2	0
Junior Pan American Games	1	0	0
Total	2	7	0
Pan American Championships
Gold medal – first place	2021 Santo Domingo	Road race
Silver medal – second place	2021 Santo Domingo	Time&nbps;trial
Silver medal – second place	2022 San Juan	Time trial
South American Games
Silver medal – second place	2022 Asunción	Road race
Silver medal – second place	2022 Asunción	Time trial
Silver medal – second place	2026 Santa Fe	Road race
Bolivarian Games
Silver medal – second place	2025 Lima-Ayacucho	Road race
Silver medal – second place	2025 Lima-Ayacucho	Time trial
Junior Pan American Games
Gold medal – first place	2021 Cali-Valle	Time trial

Lina Marcela Hernández Gómez (born 4 January 1999) is a Colombian track and road racing cyclist, who currently rides for UCI Women's Continental Team Colombia Potencia de la Vida–Strongman Femenino.

She competed at the 2021 and 2022 UCI Road World Championships, in the time trial and road race both years. She won the road race at the 2021 Pan American Road Championships.

== Major results ==
=== Road ===
2017
Pan American Junior Championships

4th Time trial
9th Road race

2019
1st Time trial, National Under-23 Championships
5th Road race, Pan American Games
2020
National Under-23 Championships

1st Road race
1st Time trial

3rd Overall Vuelta a Colombia Femenina

1st Stage 5

2021
Pan American Championships

1st Road race
2nd Time trial

1st Time trial, National Under-23 Championships
Junior Pan American Games

1st Time trial
6th Road race

4th Road race, National Championships
2022
1st Time trial, National Championships
Pan American Championships

2nd Time trial
4th Road race

South American Games

2nd Time trial
2nd Road race

2nd Overall Vuelta a Colombia Femenina
5th Overall Vuelta a Formosa Femenina
2023
1st Time trial, National Championships
7th Time trial, Pan American Games
9th Time trial, Pan American Championships
2024
1st Stage 4 Clásica de Rionegro
8th Road race, Pan American Championships
2025
Bolivarian Games

2nd Time trial
2nd Road race

2026
5th Time trial Central American and Caribbean Games
South American Games

2nd Road race
7th Time trial

=== Track ===
2018
3rd Omnium, Pan American Championships
2019
3rd Team pursuit, Pan American Games
3rd Points race, Pan American Championships
2021
Pan American Championships

1st Elimination race
1st Omnium
1st Individual pursuit
1st Team pursuit

Junior Pan American Games

1st Omnium
1st Team pursuit
2nd Madison

UCI Nations Cup

3rd Madison, Cali (with Lina Rojas)
3rd Omnium, Cali
3rd Team pursuit, Cali

2022
South American Games

1st Omnium
1st Madison (with Mariana Herrera)
1st Team pursuit

2023
Pan American Games

1st Madison (with Lina Rojas)
2nd Omnium
3rd Team pursuit

2024
Pan American Championships

2nd Omnium
2nd Madison (with Juliana Londoño)

2025
Pan American Championships

1st Madison (with Elizabeth Castaño)
2nd Omnium
3st Team pursuit

Bolivarian Games

1st Omnium
1st Madison (with Elizabeth Castaño)
2nd Team pursuit

2026
Central American and Caribbean Games

1st Madison (with Elizabeth Castaño)
1st Team pursuit
3rd Omnium

South American Games

1st Omnium
1st Madison (with Elizabeth Castaño)
1st Team pursuit
