= Maryna Ivaniuk =

Ukrainian cyclist

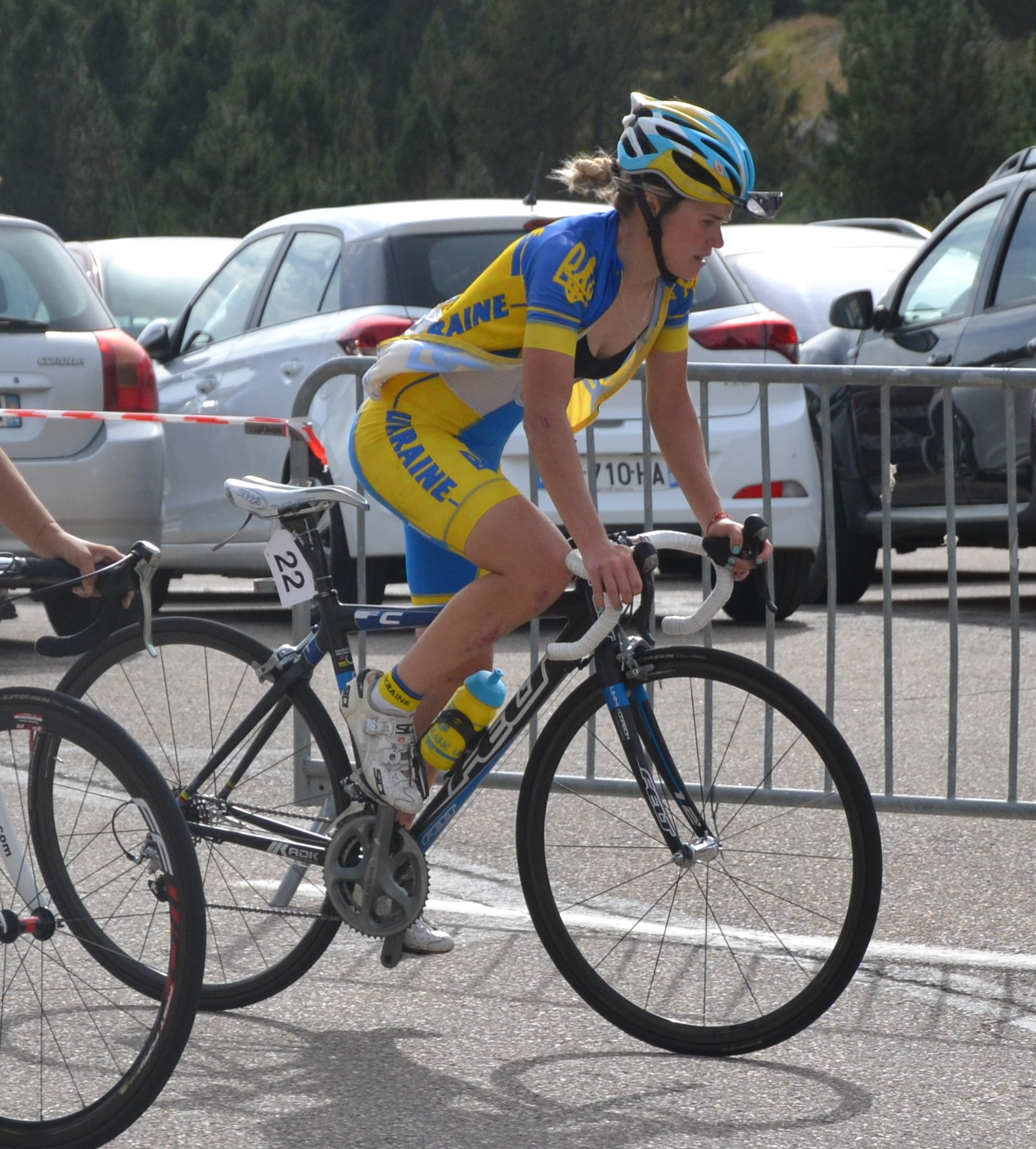
- Ivaniuk in 2016

Personal information
- Full name: Maryna Ivaniuk
- Born: 19 September 1990 (age 36)

Cycling career
- Sport: Cycling
- Discipline: Road
- Role: Rider

Professional team
- 2020: Astana

Maryna Ivaniuk (born 19 September 1990) is a Ukrainian professional racing cyclist, who most recently rode for the UCI Women's Continental Team Astana.
