= Beatrice Rossato =

Italian cyclist

Personal information
- Full name: Beatrice Rossato
- Born: 6 November 1996 (age 29)

Cycling career
- Sport: Cycling
- Current team: Isolmant–Premac–Vittoria
- Discipline: Road
- Role: Rider

Professional teams
- 2015–2016: Alé–Cipollini
- 2017–2018: Top Girls Fassa Bortolo
- 2019–: Eurotarget–Bianchi–Vittoria

Beatrice Rossato (born 6 November 1996) is an Italian professional racing cyclist, who currently rides for UCI Women's Continental Team Isolmant–Premac–Vittoria.

== See also ==
- List of 2015 UCI Women's Teams and riders
