= Cristina Tonetti =

Italian cyclist (born 1997)

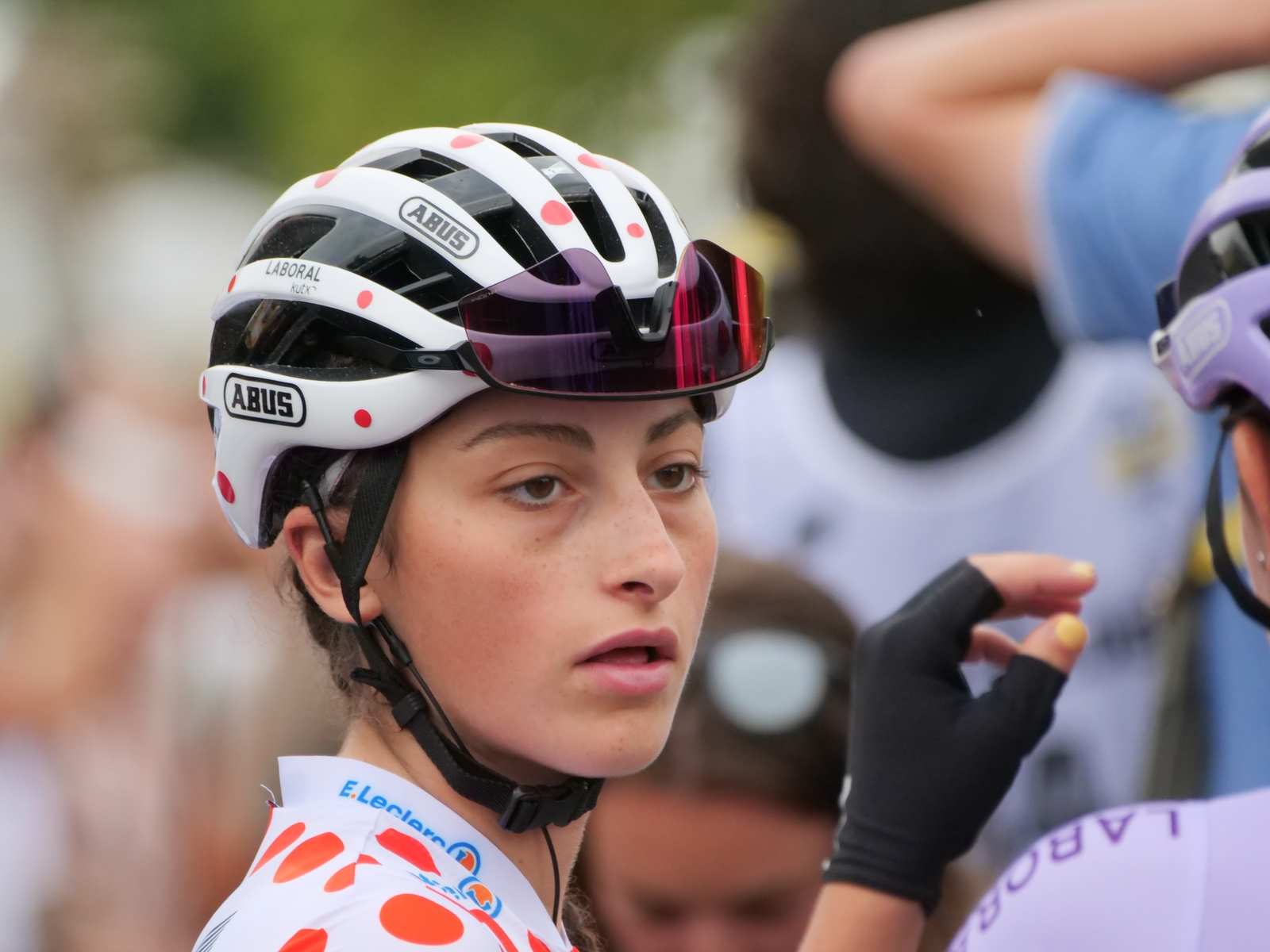
- Tonetti at the 2024 Tour de France Femmes

Personal information
- Born: 6 July 2002 (age 24) Besana in Brianza, Italy

Cycling career
- Sport: Cycling
- Current team: Laboral Kutxa–Fundación Euskadi
- Discipline: Road
- Role: Rider

Amateur team
- 2021: A.S.D. VO2 Team Pink

Professional teams
- 2022–2023: Top Girls Fassa Bortolo
- 2024–: Laboral Kutxa–Fundación Euskadi

Cristina Tonetti (born 6 July 2002) is an Italian racing cyclist, who rides for UCI Women's ProTeam Laboral Kutxa–Fundación Euskadi.

== Major results ==
2022
3rd Overall Vuelta a Formosa Femenina

1st Young rider classification

3rd Grand Prix Féminin de Chambéry
6th La Choralis Fourmies Féminine
8th Gran Premio della Liberazione
2023
2nd Gran Premio della Liberazione
4th La Classique Morbihan
5th Trofeo Oro in Euro
2025
1st Grote Prijs Yvonne Reynders
