= Francesca Pisciali =

Italian cyclist

Personal information
- Born: 19 May 1998 (age 28)

Cycling career
- Sport: Cycling
- Current team: Isolmant–Premac–Vittoria
- Discipline: Road
- Role: Rider

Amateur teams
- 2017: Servetto Giusta (stagiaire)
- 2019: Born to Win

Professional teams
- 2018: Top Girls Fassa Bortolo
- 2020–: Eurotarget–Bianchi–Vittoria

Francesca Pisciali (born 19 May 1998) is an Italian professional racing cyclist, who currently rides for UCI Women's Continental Team Isolmant–Premac–Vittoria. In August 2020, she rode in the 2020 Strade Bianche Women's race in Italy.

== Major results ==
2021
5th Grand Prix Féminin de Chambéry
2023
8th Umag Trophy LADIES
