= Gaia Masetti =

Italian cyclist (born 2001)

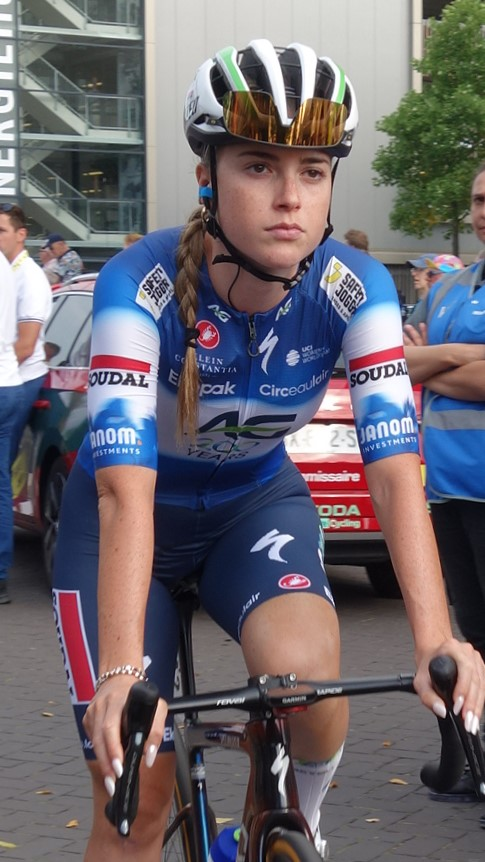
- Masetti in 2024

Personal information
- Born: 26 October 2001 (age 24) Sassuolo, Italy

Cycling career
- Sport: Cycling
- Current team: AG Insurance–Soudal
- Discipline: Road
- Role: Rider

Professional teams
- 2020–2022: Top Girls Fassa Bortolo
- 2022–: AG Insurance–NXTG
Medal record
Women's track cycling
Women's road bicycle racing
European Championships
| Gold medal – first place | 2024 Limburg | Mixed team relay |

Gaia Masetti (born 26 October 2001) is an Italian professional racing cyclist, who currently rides for UCI Women's WorldTeam AG Insurance–Soudal.

Masetti finished on the podium at the 2022 Dwars door de Westhoek. She rode in the 2022 Tour de France Femmes. In 2023, she took her first professional win at the La Classique Morbihan.

== Major results ==
2019
2nd Piccolo Trofeo Alfredo Binda
2022
3rd Dwars door de Westhoek
10th Dwars door het Hageland
2023
1st La Classique Morbihan
UEC European Under-23 Road Championships

4th Road race
10th Time trial

5th Overall Watersley Women's Challenge
7th Grand Prix du Morbihan Féminin
2024
1st Team relay, UEC European Road Championships
4th Time trial, National Road Championships
