= Carmela Cipriani =

Italian racing cyclist (born 1996)

Personal information
- Born: 11 November 1996 (age 29)

Cycling career
- Sport: Cycling
- Discipline: Road
- Role: Rider

Professional teams
- 2016: Hagens Berman–Supermint
- 2017–2018: Conceria Zabri–Fanini–Guerciotti
- 2019–2020: Aromitalia–Basso Bikes–Vaiano

Carmela Cipriani (born 11 November 1996) is an Italian professional racing cyclist, who most recently rode for UCI Women's Continental Team Aromitalia–Basso Bikes–Vaiano.

== See also ==
- List of 2016 UCI Women's Teams and riders
