= Gran Premio Ciudad de Eibar =

Spanish one-day road cycling race

Race details
- Date: May
- Region: Eibar, Spain
- English name: Grand Prix of the City of Eibar
- Discipline: Road
- Competition: UCI Women's ProSeries
- Type: One-day race
- Web site: clubciclistaeibarres.org/gran-premio-ciudad-de-eibar-2021/

History
- First edition: 2021
- Editions: 5 (as of 2025)
- First winner: Anna van der Breggen (NED)
- Most wins: Olivia Baril (CAN) (2 wins)
- Most recent: Debora Silvestri (ITA)

The Gran Premio Ciudad de Eibar is an elite women's professional one-day road bicycle race held annually in Eibar, Spain. The event was initially planned to take place in 2020, but was cancelled due to the COVID-19 pandemic. Therefore, it first held in 2021 as a category 1.1 race, before upgrading to the UCI Women's ProSeries in 2024.

== Past winners ==
Year	Country	Rider	Team
2021	Netherlands	Anna van der Breggen	SD Worx
2022	Canada	Olivia Baril	Valcar–Travel & Service
2023	Canada	Olivia Baril	UAE Team ADQ
2024	Spain	Yurani Blanco	Laboral Kutxa–Fundación Euskadi
2025	Italy	Debora Silvestri	Laboral Kutxa–Fundación Euskadi
