= Giulia Marchesini =

Italian racing cyclist

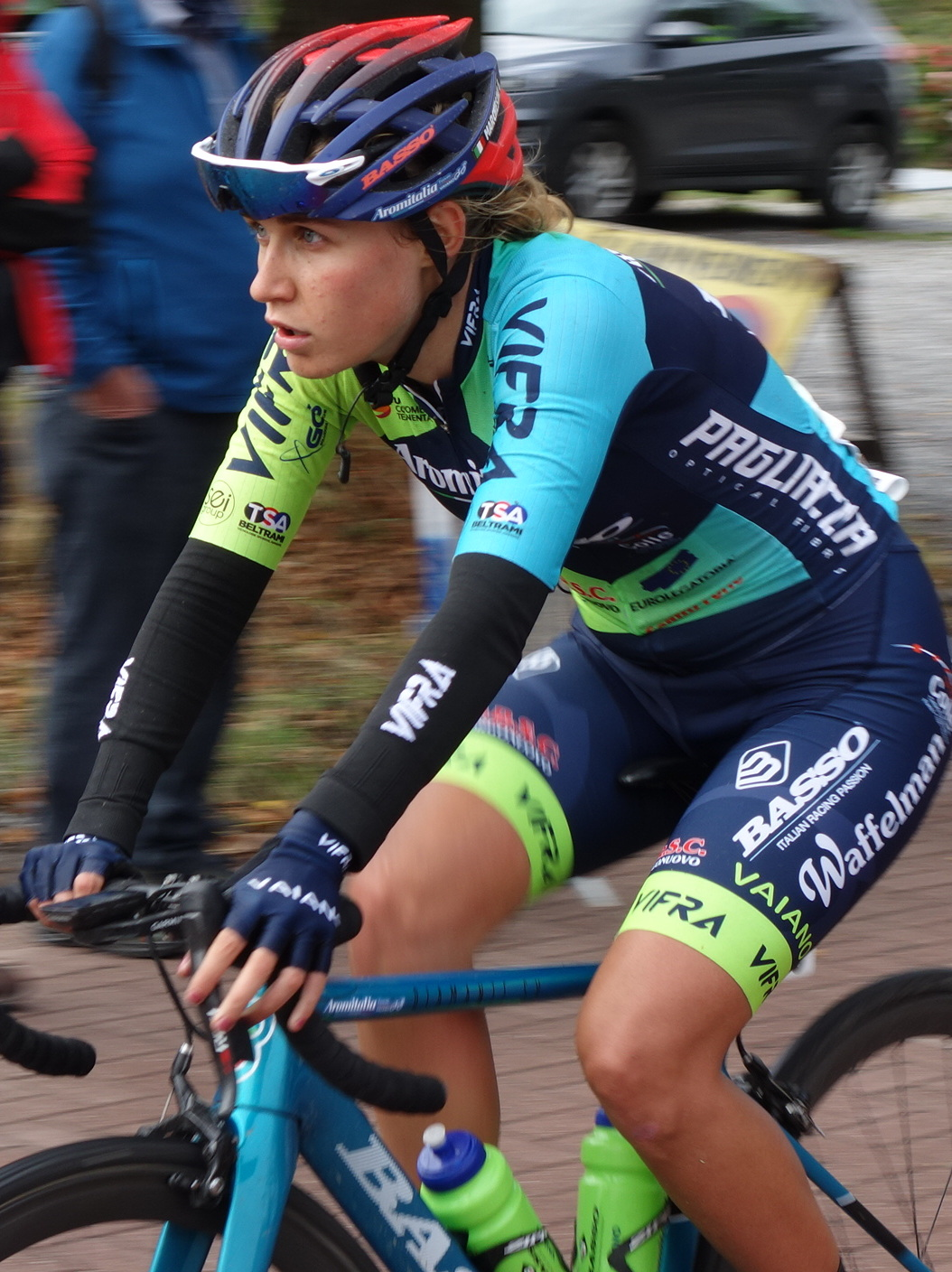
- Marchesini at the 2020 Flèche Wallonne

Personal information
- Born: 14 May 1998 (age 28)

Cycling career
- Sport: Cycling
- Current team: Aromitalia Vaiano
- Discipline: Road
- Role: Rider

Professional team
- 2017–: Aromitalia Vaiano

Giulia Marchesini (born 14 May 1998) is an Italian professional racing cyclist, who currently rides for UCI Women's Continental Team Aromitalia Vaiano.
