= Matilde Vitillo =

Italian Cyclist

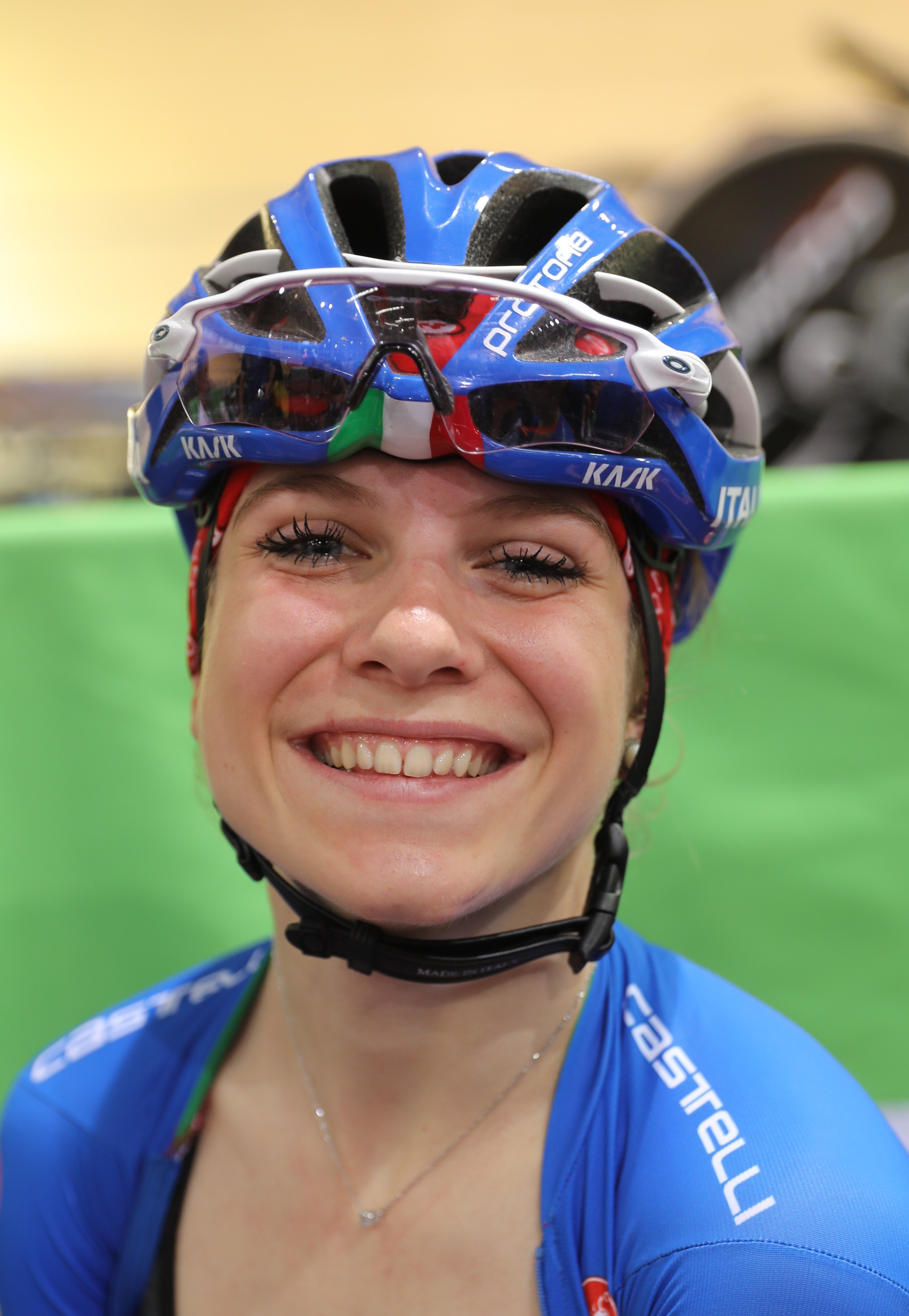

Personal information
- Born: 8 March 2001 (age 25) Turin, Italy
- Height: 1.62 m (5 ft 4 in)
- Weight: 51 kg (112 lb)

Cycling career
- Sport: Cycling
- Current team: Liv AlUla Jayco
- Discipline: Road
- Role: Rider

Professional teams
- 2021–2023: Bepink
- 2024–: Liv AlUla Jayco

Matilde Vitillo (8 March 2001) is an Italian female cyclist currently riding for UCI Women's Team Liv AlUla Jayco.

== Career ==
In 2019 as part of the Italian nation team she won the Team pursuit at the UCI Junior Track Cycling World Championships with Giorgia Catarzi, Camilla Alessio, Eleonora Gasparrini and Sofia Collinelli. In 2022 she won the second stage of the Vuelta a Burgos Feminas in a photo-finish.

== Major results ==
2019
1st Team pursuit, UCI Junior Track World Championships
2022
1st Stage 2 Vuelta a Burgos Feminas
