= Alice Gasparini =

Italian cyclist

Personal information
- Full name: Alice Gasparini
- Born: 14 December 1997 (age 28)

Cycling career
- Sport: Cycling
- Current team: Isolmant–Premac–Vittoria
- Discipline: Road
- Role: Rider

Professional teams
- 2016–2017: Servetto Footon
- 2018–: Eurotarget–Bianchi–Vitasana

Alice Gasparini (born 14 December 1997) is an Italian professional racing cyclist, who currently rides for UCI Women's Continental Team Isolmant–Premac–Vittoria.

== See also ==
- List of 2016 UCI Women's Teams and riders
