= Giorgia Bariani =

Italian cyclist

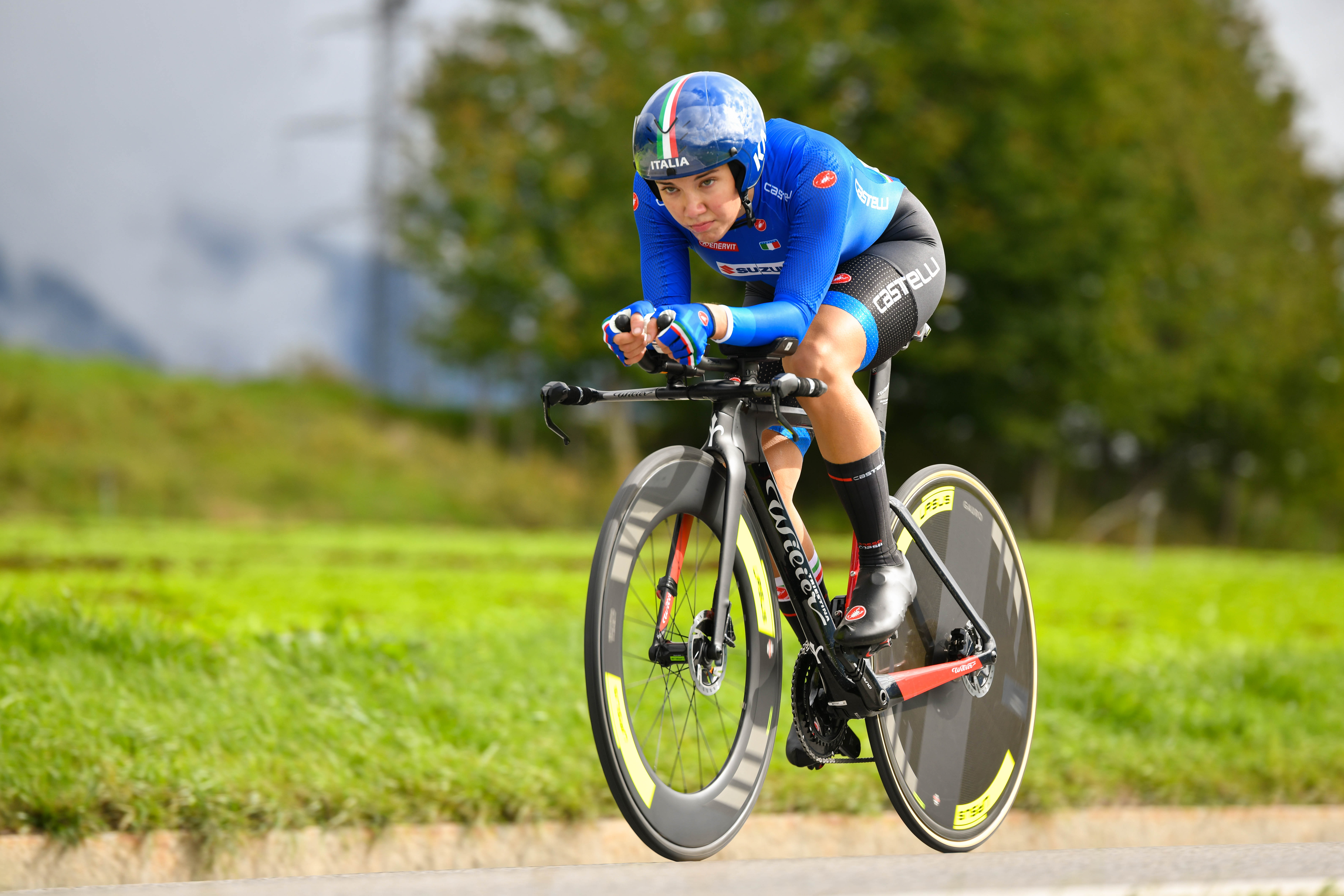
- Bariani in 2018

Personal information
- Full name: Giorgia Bariani
- Born: 19 November 2000 (age 25)

Cycling career
- Sport: Cycling
- Current team: Top Girls Fassa Bortolo
- Discipline: Road
- Role: Rider

Professional teams
- 2019: Alé–Cipollini
- 2020–: Top Girls Fassa Bortolo

Giorgia Bariani (born 19 November 2000) is an Italian professional racing cyclist, who currently rides for UCI Women's Continental Team Top Girls Fassa Bortolo.
