= Karolina Kumięga =

Polish cyclist (born 1999)

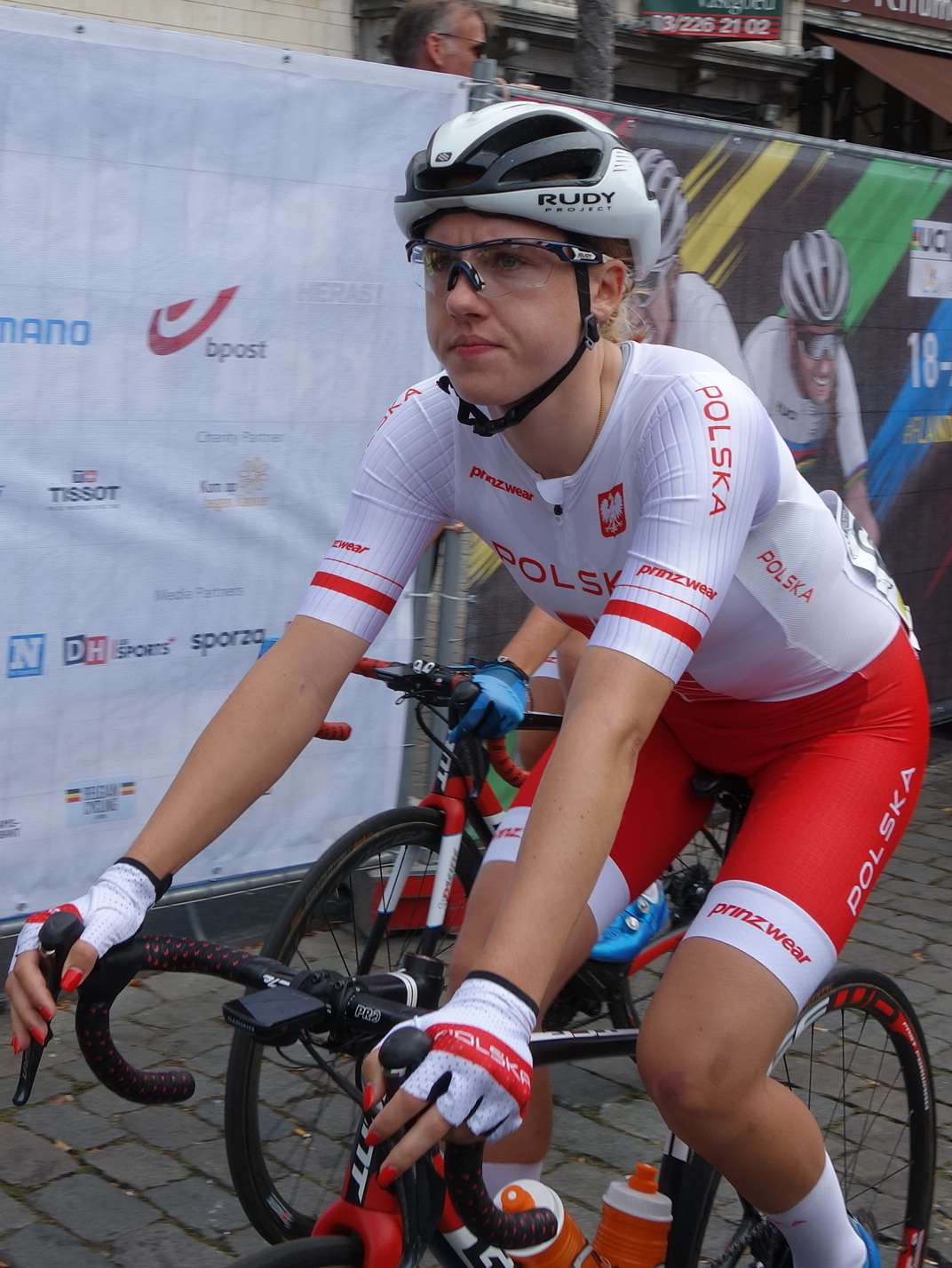
- Kumięga at the 2021 World Championships

Personal information
- Born: 16 April 1999 (age 27)

Cycling career
- Sport: Cycling
- Current team: UAE Team L'Imad
- Discipline: Road
- Role: Rider

Professional teams
- 2022: Valcar–Travel & Service
- 2023–: UAE Team ADQ

Karolina Kumięga (born 16 April 1999) is a Polish professional racing cyclist, who currently rides for UCI Women's WorldTeam UAE Team L'Imad. She rode in the women's road race event at the 2020 UCI Road World Championships.

== Major results ==
2020
National Road Championships

3rd Time trial
4th Road race

2021
4th Overall Giro della Toscana Int. Femminile – Memorial Michela Fanini

1st Young rider classification

2022
National Road Championships

4th Time trial
4th Road race

5th Overall Giro della Toscana Int. Femminile – Memorial Michela Fanini

1st Stage 2

7th La Classique Morbihan
2023
4th Time trial, National Road Championships
