= Vuelta a Colombia Femenina =

Women's cycling stage race

Race details
- Date: Varies
- Region: Colombia
- English name: Women's Tour of Colombia
- Local name: Vuelta a Colombia Femenina
- Discipline: Road race
- Competition: UCI
- Type: Stage race
- Web site: www.federacioncolombianadeciclismo.com/ciclismo-femenino/

History
- First edition: 2016
- Editions: 11 (as of 2026)
- First winner: Ana Sanabria (COL)
- Most wins: Lilibeth Chacón (VEN) (4 wins)
- Most recent: Lilibeth Chacón (VEN)

The Vuelta a Colombia Femenina is an annual women's cycling road race, run over many stages in Colombia. The first event in 2016 was classed as an amateur category event, whereas the 2017 event was given a UCI 2.2 category. Venezuelan Lilibeth Chacón has won the race on four occasions, the most of any rider.

== History ==
The idea for a Vuelta a Colombia Femenina had been considered for many years by the Colombian Cycling Federation, who organised the men's Vuelta a Colombia event. The Vuelta a Colombia Femenina is supported by Coldeportes, a Colombian Government Organisation for the promotion of sport and private enterprise. After the 2016 Vuelta a Colombia Femenina, the Colombian Cycling Federation announced that the 2017 Vuelta a Colombia Femenina Oro y Paz would be upgraded to a UCI 2.2 event.

The 2017 event ran between 24 and 29 October. The race began with a 6.6 kilometres (4.1 mi) prologue time trial around Zarzal, before stages in the traditional municipalities of Valle del Cauca, including the cities of Buga and Cartago, Risaralda and Caldas. The last stage finished at the Plaza de Toros de Manizales. Ana Sanabria won the race for the second year in a row.

The 2018 event ran between 10 and 14 October, with one time trail, two medium mountain stages, and two flat stages. The route passed through Cundinamarca, Boyacá, and Santander. The race was won for a third time by Ana Sanabria.

The 2019 event passed through Caldas, Risaralda and Valle del Cauca, and the final stage was a 74 kilometres (46 mi) circuit of Pereira. The race was won by Chilean Aranza Villalón, the first non-Colombian to do so.

The 2020 event ran from 7 to 11 November, started in Cómbita, and ended in Boyacá. It passed through Vélez. Due to the COVID-19 pandemic, all competitors and team staff had to undertake multiple coronavirus tests. The race was won by Ecuadorian Miryam Nuñez, who took the leader's jersey on stage two, and held it for the rest of the race.

The 2021 event ran from 28 September to 3 October. Five of the six stages were in Meta Department. The race started in Villavicencio, and the final stage involved seven circuits of a course in Bogotá National Park. The race was won by Venezuelan Lilibeth Chacón, by a margin of one minute and 54 seconds. Chacón won the third stage, an individual time trial from Castilla la Nueva to Acacías, and won the stage to Alto de Buenavista the next day, taking the leader's jersey in the general classification in the process. Chacón also won the points and mountains classifications.

The 2022 event ran from 9 to 14 August. The race started in Sopó, and travelled through the departments of Cundinamarca, Boyacá and Santander, finishing in Bucaramanga. The race was won by Colombian Diana Peñuela, who won four of the six stages, and held the leader's jersey throughout. Lina Hernández and Anet Barrera finished second and third respectively, whilst Ana Sanabria won the mountains classification.

== Past winners ==
Year	Country	Rider	Team
2016	Colombia	Ana Sanabria	
2017	Colombia	Ana Sanabria	Servetto Giusta
2018	Colombia	Ana Sanabria	Servetto–Stradalli Cycle–Alurecycling
2019	Chile	Aranza Villalón	Weber Shimano Ladies Power
2020	Ecuador	Miryan Nuñez	Liro Sport–Alcaldía La Vega
2021	Venezuela	Lilibeth Chacón	Merquimia Proyecta Team
2022	Colombia	Diana Peñuela	DNA Pro Cycling
2023	Venezuela	Lilibeth Chacón	
2024	Venezuela	Lilibeth Chacón	
2025	Colombia	Diana Peñuela	
2026	Venezuela	Lilibeth Chacón	

== Leaders jerseys ==
Classification	2016	2017	2018	2019	2020	2021	2022
General							
Mountains							
Points							
Sprints							
Youth	N/A	No jersey		N/A			
Teams	N/A						
