= Iris Monticolo =

Italian cyclist

Personal information
- Full name: Iris Monticolo
- Born: 15 July 2000 (age 26)

Cycling career
- Sport: Cycling
- Current team: Top Girls Fassa Bortolo
- Discipline: Road
- Role: Rider

Professional team
- 2019–: Top Girls Fassa Bortolo

Iris Monticolo (born 15 July 2000) is an Italian professional racing cyclist, who currently rides for UCI Women's Continental Team Top Girls Fassa Bortolo.
