= Sofia Rodríguez =

Spanish cyclist

Personal information
- Full name: Sofia Rodríguez Revert
- Born: 21 October 1999 (age 26)

Cycling career
- Sport: Cycling
- Discipline: Road
- Role: Rider

Professional teams
- 2018–2021: Sopela Women's Team
- 2022–2023: Bizkaia–Durango

Sofia Rodríguez Revert (born 21 October 1999) is a Spanish professional racing cyclist, who rode for UCI Women's Continental Team Sopela Women's Team.
