= Francesca Baroni =

Italian cyclist

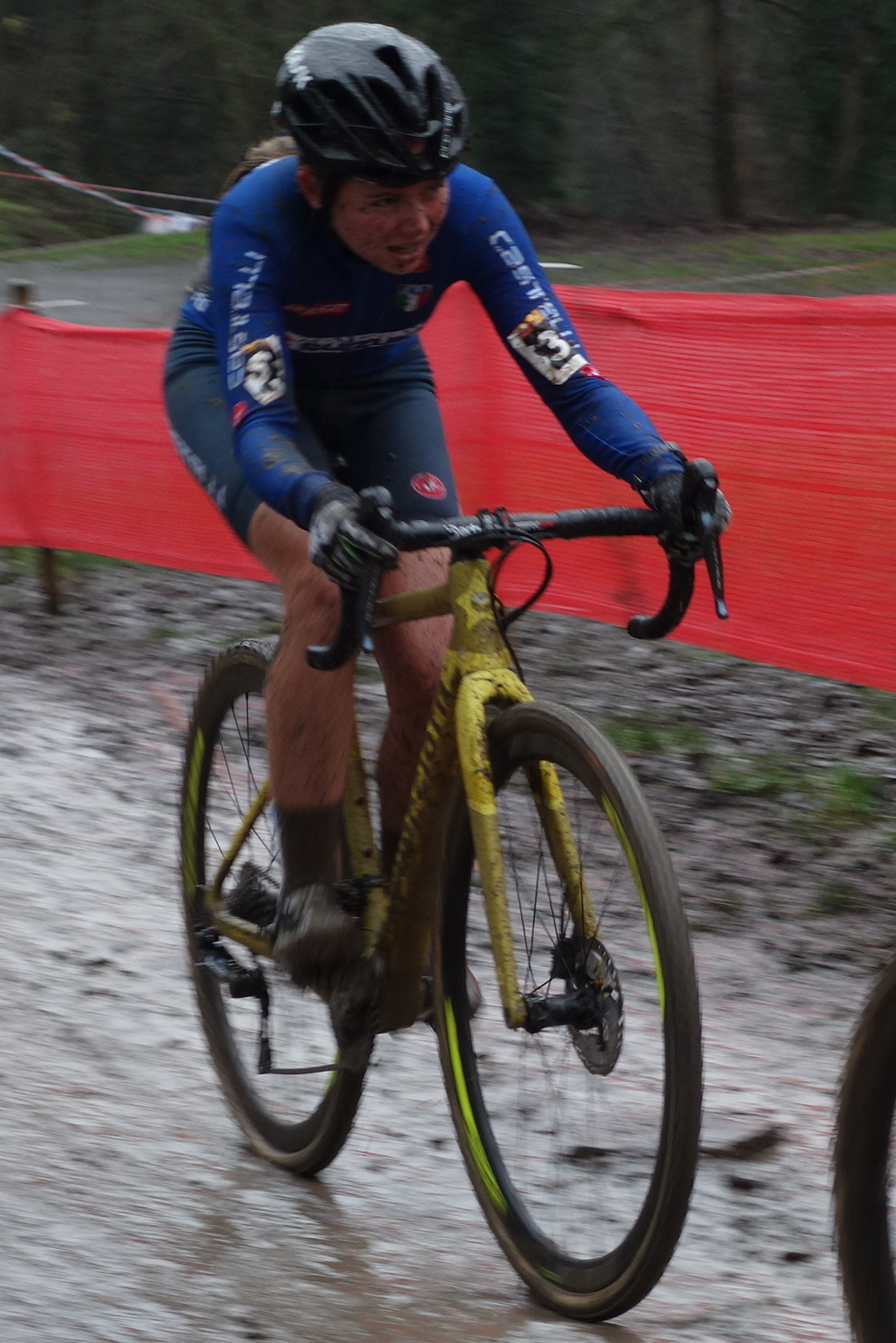
- Baroni at the Citadelcross Namur in 2019

Personal information
- Born: 4 November 1999 (age 26)

Cycling career
- Sport: Cycling
- Current team: Isolmant–Premac–Vittoria (road); Selle Italia–Guerciotti–Elite (cyclo-cross)
- Disciplines: Road; Cyclo-cross
- Role: Rider

Amateur teams
- 2011: U.C. Piano di Mommio A.S.D.
- 2012: A.S.D. Special Team Livorno
- 2013: A.S.D. Elba Bike
- 2014–2016: Melavi Focus Bike
- 2017–2018: A.S.D. Selle Italia Guerciotti Elite

Professional teams
- 2018–: Selle Italia–Guerciotti–Elite
- 2020: Servetto–Piumate–Beltrami TSA (road)
- 2021–: Isolmant–Premac–Vittoria (road)

Francesca Baroni (born 4 November 1999) is an Italian professional racing cyclist, who currently rides for UCI Women's Continental Team Isolmant–Premac–Vittoria in road racing, and UCI Cyclo-cross Team Selle Italia–Guerciotti–Elite in cyclo-cross. In August 2020, she rode in the 2020 Strade Bianche Women's race in Italy. She has been deaf since birth.

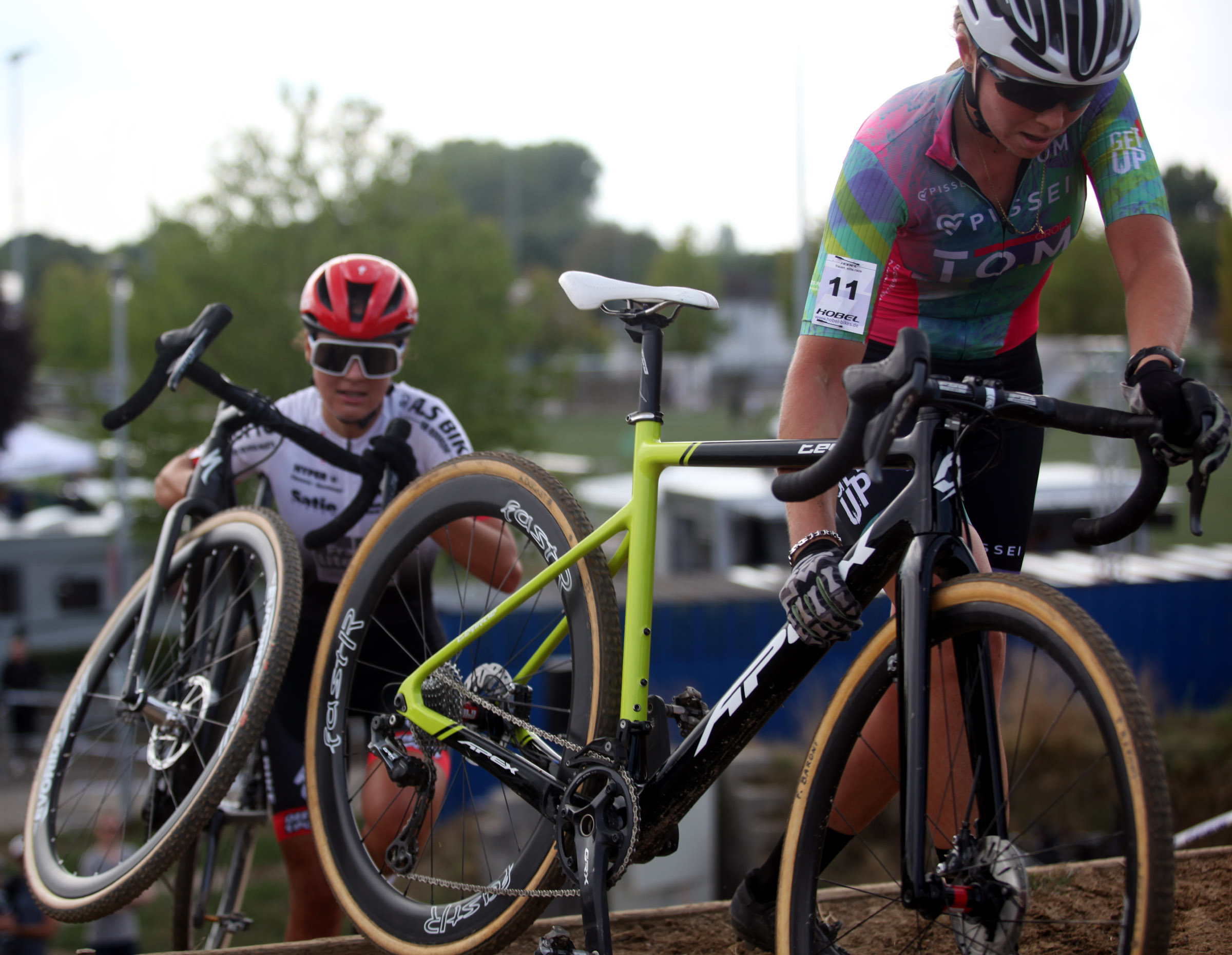
Francesca Baroni (r) in 2022
