= Gemma Sernissi =

Italian racing cyclist

Personal information
- Full name: Gemma Sernissi
- Born: 6 March 2000 (age 26)

Cycling career
- Sport: Cycling
- Current team: Aromitalia Vaiano
- Discipline: Road
- Role: Rider

Professional team
- 2019–: Aromitalia–Basso Bikes–Vaiano

Gemma Sernissi (born 6 March 2000) is an Italian professional racing cyclist, who currently rides for UCI Women's Continental Team Aromitalia Vaiano.
