= Team Mendelspeck =

Italian cycling team

Team information
- UCI code: MDS (2019–)
- Registered: Italy
- Founded: 2019
- Discipline: Road
- Status: National (2019–2021); UCI Women's Continental Team (2022–)

Team name history
- 2019–2021 2022–: GS Mendelspeck; Team Mendelspeck

Team Mendelspeck is an Italian women's road cycling team that was founded in 2019, before registering with the UCI for the 2022 season.

== Major results ==
Stage 3 Giro delle Marche in Rosa, Angela Oro
