= Greta Marturano =

Italian cyclist (born 1998)

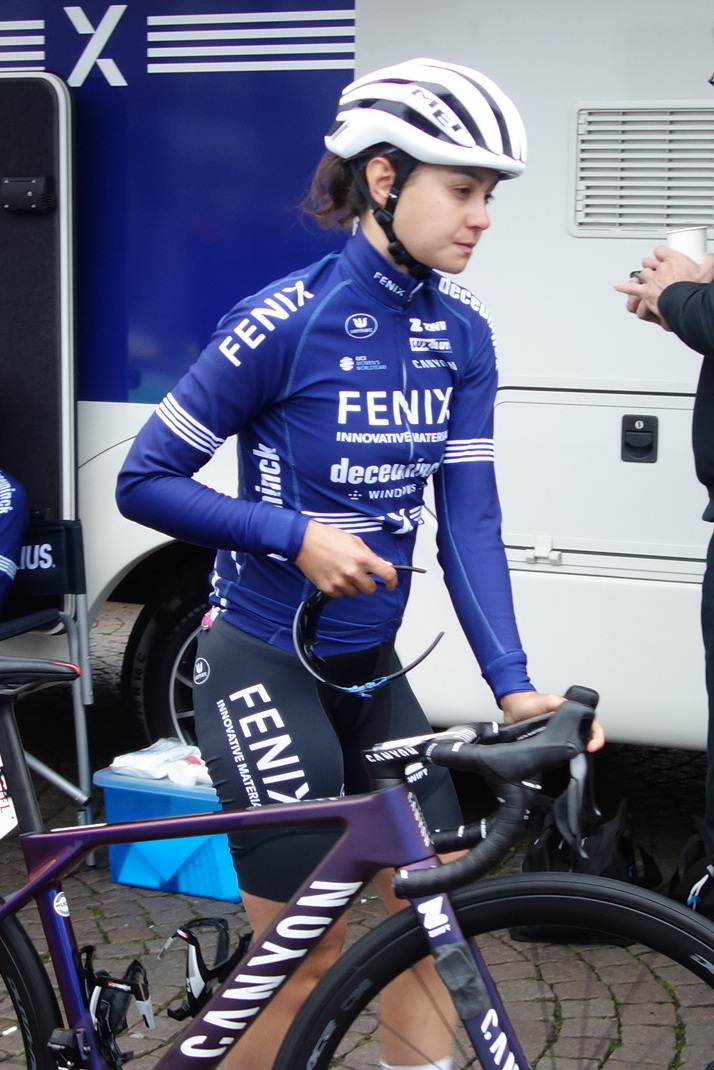

Personal information
- Full name: Greta Marturano
- Born: 14 June 1998 (age 28) Cantù, Italy

Cycling career
- Sport: Cycling
- Current team: UAE Team L'Imad
- Discipline: Road
- Role: Rider

Professional teams
- 2018: S.C. Michela Fanini Rox
- 2019–2022: Top Girls Fassa Bortolo
- 2023–2024: Fenix–Deceuninck
- 2025–: UAE Team ADQ

Greta Marturano (born 14 June 1998) is an Italian professional racing cyclist who currently rides for UCI Women's WorldTeam UAE Team L'Imad.

== Major results ==
2018
8th Time trial, National Road Championships
9th SwissEver GP Cham-Hagendorn
2019
9th Overall Giro delle Marche in Rosa
2020
1st Young rider classification, Setmana Ciclista Valenciana
7th Time trial, National Road Championships
2021
4th Grand Prix Féminin de Chambéry
8th Overall Setmana Ciclista Valenciana
2022
4th Memorial Monica Bandini
4th Overall Tour Féminin International des Pyrénées
6th Grand Prix Féminin de Chambéry
7th Gran Premio della Liberazione
8th Overall Thüringen Ladies Tour
9th Trofeo Oro in Euro
2024
9th Road race, National Championships
2025
3rd Overall Vuelta a Extremadura Femenina

1st Stage 1b
