= Isolmant–Premac–Vittoria =

Italian cycling team

Team information
- UCI code: SBT
- Registered: Italy
- Founded: 2006
- Status: National (2006–2017); UCI Women's Team (2018–2019); UCI Women's Continental Team (2020–present)

Team name history
- 2006–2017 2018 2019–2020 2021–: Still Bike Team A.S. Dilettantistica; Eurotarget–Bianchi–Vitasana; Eurotarget–Bianchi–Vittoria; Isolmant–Premac–Vittoria

Isolmant–Premac–Vittoria is a professional road bicycle racing women's team which participates in elite women's races.

The team was originally set up in 2006 as an amateur, national-level, team before becoming a professional team in 2018.

== Team roster ==
As of 23 January 2021.

Rider	Date of birth
Francesca Baroni (ITA)	4 November 1999 (age 26)
Noemi Lucrezia Eremita (ITA)	30 August 2002 (age 24)
Martina Fidanza (ITA)	5 November 1999 (age 26)
Giorgia Fraiegari (ITA)	18 July 1995 (age 31)
Alice Gasparini (ITA)	14 December 1997 (age 28)

Rider	Date of birth
Francesca Pisciali (ITA)	19 May 1998 (age 28)
Gaia Realini (ITA)	19 June 2001 (age 25)
Beatrice Rossato (ITA)	6 November 1996 (age 29)
Greta Tebaldi (ITA)	5 January 2002 (age 24)
Emanuela Zanetti (ITA)	13 March 2000 (age 26)

== Major results ==
2021
Brugherio Cyclo-cross, Gaia Realini

== National Champions ==
2018
Romania Time Trial, Ana Covrig
Romania Road Race, Ana Covrig
Italy Track (Keirin), Martina Fidanza

2019
Romania Time Trial, Ana Covrig
Romania Road Race, Ana Covrig
Italy Track (Keirin), Martina Fidanza

2020
Latvia Track (Omnium), Lina Svarinska
Latvia Track (Points race), Lina Svarinska
European U23 Track (Team Pursuit), Martina Fidanza
European U23 Track (Scratch race), Martina Fidanza

2021
Italy U23 Cyclo-cross, Francesca Baroni
European U23 Track (Team Pursuit), Martina Fidanza
European U23 Track (Madison), Martina Fidanza
Italy Track (Madison), Martina Fidanza
World Track (Scratch race), Martina Fidanza

2022
Italy U23 Cyclo-cross, Gaia Realini
