= Sofia Collinelli =

Italian cyclist (born 2001)

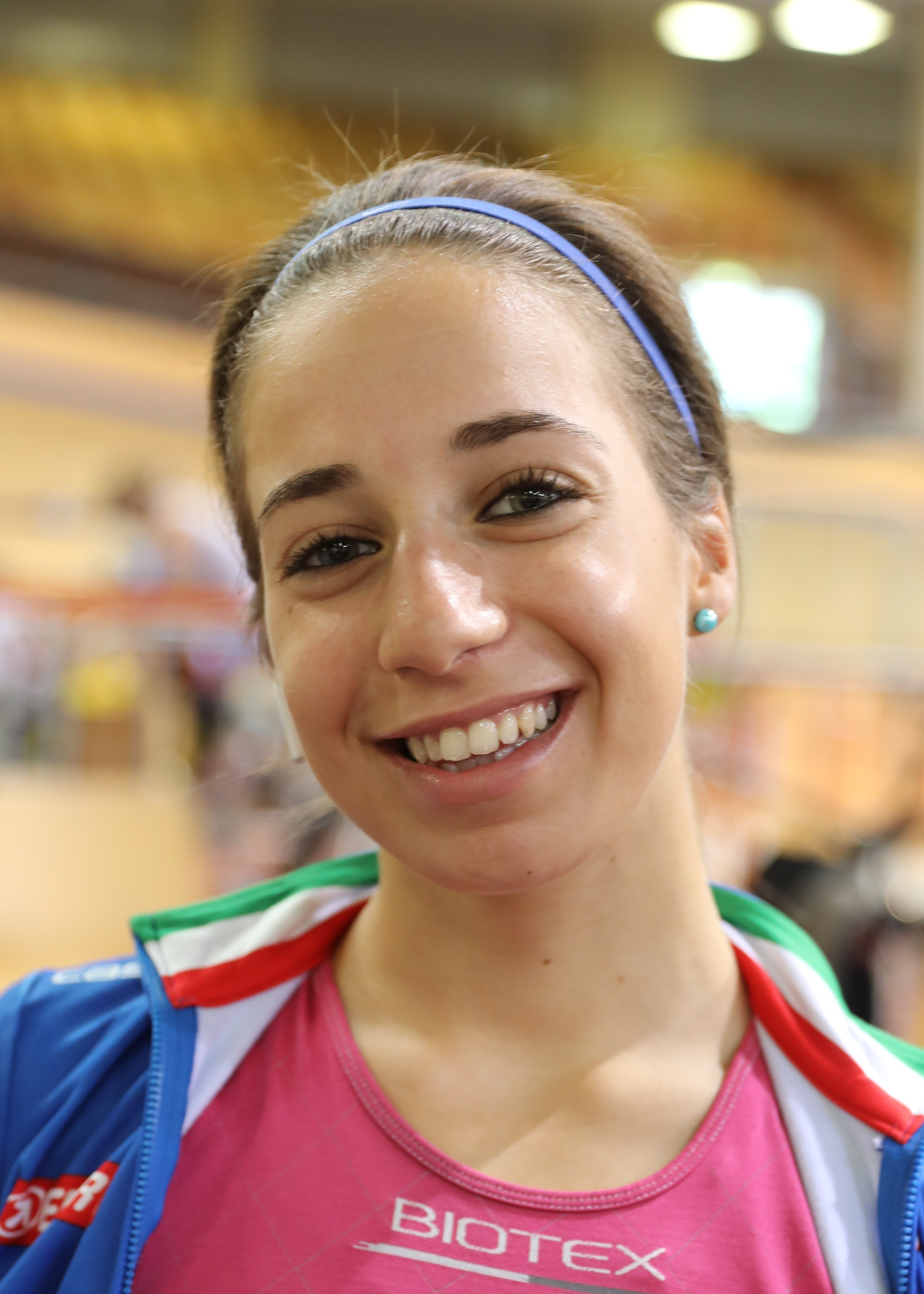
- Collinelli at the 2019 UCI Junior Track Cycling World Championships

Personal information
- Born: 24 August 2001 (age 25) Ravenna, Italy

Cycling career
- Sport: Cycling
- Current team: Roland Le Dévoluy
- Disciplines: Road; Track
- Role: Rider

Professional teams
- 2020–2022: Aromitalia–Basso Bikes–Vaiano
- 2023–: Israel Premier Tech Roland
Medal record
| Event | 1st | 2nd | 3rd |
|---|---|---|---|
| World Junior Championships | 2 | 0 | 0 |
| European Junior Championships | 2 | 0 | 1 |
| Total | 4 | 0 | 1 |
World Junior Championships
| Gold medal – first place | 2018 Aigle | Team pursuit |
| Gold medal – first place | 2019 Frankfurt | Team pursuit |
European Junior Championships
| Gold medal – first place | 2018 Aigle | Team pursuit |
| Gold medal – first place | 2019 Ghent | Team pursuit |
| Bronze medal – third place | 2019 Ghent | Madison |

Sofia Collinelli (born 24 August 2001) is an Italian professional racing cyclist, who currently rides for UCI Women's WorldTeam Roland Le Dévoluy. She is the daughter of Andrea Collinelli, who won a gold medal in the individual pursuit at the 1996 Atlanta Olympics.

== Career ==
Collinelli has won gold medals in the team pursuit at the World Junior Championships and European Junior Championships in 2018 and 2019. In 2019 at the European Junior Championships was also bronze medal in the madison.
