= Top Girls Fassa Bortolo =

Italian cycling team

Team information
- UCI code: TOP
- Registered: Italy
- Founded: 2005
- Discipline: Road
- Status: UCI Women's Team (2005–2019); UCI Women's Continental Team (2020–present)
- Website: Team home page

Team name history
- 2005 2006–2008 2009 2010–2011 2012 2013–: Top Girls Fassa Bortolo Hausbrandt Caffé (TOG); Top Girls Fassa Bortolo Raxy Line (TOG); Gruppo Sportivo Top Girls–Fassa Bortolo–Raxy Line (TOG); Top Girls–Fassa Bortolo (TOG); Fassa Bortolo–Servetto (TOG); Top Girls Fassa Bortolo

Top Girls Fassa Bortolo (UCI team code: TOP) is a professional cycling team based in Italy, which competes in elite road bicycle racing events such as the UCI Women's World Tour.

== Team history ==
On 5 November 2014, Francesca Cauz left the team to join Alé–Cipollini. On 19 November 2014, the team signed Elena Leonardi, Nicole dal Santo and Rossella Callovi, as well as signing contract extensions with; Asja Paladin, Soraya Paladin, Chiara Pierobon, Jennifer Fiori, Irene Bitto and Sara Grifi. Natasha Grillo left the team and Silvia Cecchini retired.

== Team roster ==
As of 28 January 2021.

Rider	Date of birth
Michela Balducci (ITA)	30 March 1995 (age 31)
Giorgia Bariani (ITA)	19 November 2000 (age 25)
Elisa Dalla Valle (ITA)	16 January 1998 (age 28)
Erika Jesenko (SLO)	14 April 1996 (age 30)
Greta Marturano (ITA)	14 June 1998 (age 28)

Rider	Date of birth
Gaia Masetti (ITA)	26 October 2001 (age 24)
Vanessa Michieletto (ITA)	5 March 2002 (age 24)
Iris Monticolo (ITA)	15 July 2000 (age 26)
Debora Silvestri (ITA)	8 May 1998 (age 28)
Giorgia Vettorello (ITA)	6 July 2000 (age 26)

== Major results ==
2005
Stage 1b Tour de l'Ardèche, Tania Belvederesi
2006
Brissago, Fabiana Luperini
Giro del Lago Maggiore — GP Knorr, Fabiana Luperini
GP Costa Etrusca, Fabiana Luperini
Giro del Friuli Donne, Fabiana Luperini
Overall Emakumeen Euskal Bira, Fabiana Luperini

Stage 2, Tatiana Guderzo
Stage 3a, Fabiana Luperini

2008
Lancy, Alessandra D'Ettore
Stage 1 Tour de Pologne Feminin, Alessandra D'Ettore
2009
Cham, Alessandra D'Ettore
2013
Young rider classification Giro d'Italia Femminile, Francesca Cauz
2016
Gran Premio Hotel Fiera Bolzano, Nadia Quagliotto
2017
Gran Premio Hotel Fiera Bolzano, Nadia Quagliotto
Trofeo Prealpi in Rosa, Nadia Quagliotto
2018
Memorial Valeria Cappellotto, Laura Tomasi
Giro Dei Due Comuni – Memorial Chiara Pierobon, Laura Tomasi
Grand Prix Industry and Commerce of Bottanuco, Laura Tomasi
Stage 3 Giro delle Marche, Laura Tomasi
2021
Stage 2 Giro della Toscana Int. Femminile, Giorgia Bariani
Mountains classification Festival Elsy Jacobs, Debora Silvestri

== National champions ==
2005
Italy Time Trial, Tatiana Guderzo
2006
Italy Road Race, Fabiana Luperini
Spain Time Trial, Eneritz Iturriaga
2011
Italy Track (Individual Pursuit), Silvia Valsecchi
Italy Track (Team Pursuit), Silvia Valsecchi
Italy Track (Team Pursuit), Gloria Presti
Italy Track (Team Pursuit), Simona Frapporti
2017
Romania Road Race, Ana Covrig
Romania Time Trial, Ana Covrig
2019
Croatia Road Race, Maja Perinović
Croatia U23 Time Trial, Maja Perinović
2020
Croatia Road Race, Maja Perinović
Croatia U23 Time Trial, Maja Perinović
