= List of teams and cyclists in the 2023 La Vuelta Femenina =

List of cyclists

161 riders across 23 seven-member teams took part in the 2023 La Vuelta Femenina. Thirty-six nationalities took part, with the largest percentage being Spain (18% of the peloton). 127 riders finished the event.

== Teams ==
12 UCI Women's WorldTeams were automatically invited, joined by 12 UCI Women's Continental Teams (9 of them from Spain). The teams were announced on 3 March 2023.

On 26 April, Zaaf Cycling Team withdrew their entry following allegations of unpaid wages. Two days later, the Union Cycliste Internationale (UCI) revoked Zaaf's licence as they lacked the required number of riders. 23 teams therefore took part in the race.

UCI Women's WorldTeams

- Canyon//SRAM
- EF Education–Tibco–SVB
- FDJ–Suez
- Israel Premier Tech Roland
- Liv Racing TeqFind
- Movistar Team
- Team DSM
- Team Jayco–AlUla
- Team Jumbo–Visma
- SD Worx
- Trek–Segafredo
- UAE Team ADQ

UCI Women's Continental Teams

- Bepink
- Bizkaia–Durango
- Eneicat–CMTeam–Seguros Deportivos
- Laboral Kutxa–Fundación Euskadi
- Massi–Tactic
- Cantabria Deporte–Río Miera
- Soltec Team
- Sopela Women's Team
- St. Michel–Mavic–Auber93
- Team Coop–Hitec Products
- Team Farto–BTC
- ~~Zaaf Cycling Team~~

== Cyclists ==
Legend
| No. | Starting number worn by the rider during the race |
| Pos. | Position in the general classification |
| Time | Deficit to the winner of the general classification |
| | Denotes the winner of the general classification |
| | Denotes the winner of the points classification |
| | Denotes the winner of the mountains classification |
| | Denotes riders that represent the winner of the team classification |
| DNS | Denotes a rider who did not start a stage, followed by the stage before which she withdrew |
| DNF | Denotes a rider who did not finish a stage, followed by the stage in which she withdrew |
| DSQ | Denotes a rider who was disqualified from the race, followed by the stage in which this occurred |
| OTL | Denotes a rider finished outside the time limit, followed by the stage in which they did so |
| COV | Denotes a rider who withdrawn because of COVID-19 either because she tested positive or two members of team tested positive, followed by the stage before which she withdrew |
Ages correct as of Monday 1 May 2023, the date on which the race begins

=== By starting number ===
| No. | Name | Nationality | Team | Age | Pos. | Time | Ref. |
|---|---|---|---|---|---|---|---|
| 1 | Aude Biannic | France | Movistar Team | 32 | 84 | + 1h 08' 52" | |
| 2 | Emma Norsgaard | Denmark | Movistar Team | 23 | 73 | + 57' 37" | |
| 3 | Liane Lippert | Germany | Movistar Team | 25 | 21 | + 15' 15" | |
| 4 | Floortje Mackaij | Netherlands | Movistar Team | 27 | 62 | + 50' 04" | |
| 5 | Lourdes Oyarbide | Spain | Movistar Team | 29 | 102 | + 1h 25' 38" | |
| 6 | Paula Andrea Patiño | Colombia | Movistar Team | 26 | 34 | + 30' 25" | |
| 7 | Annemiek van Vleuten | Netherlands | Movistar Team | 40 | 1 | 19h 00' 11" | |
| 11 | Niamh Fisher-Black | New Zealand | SD Worx | 22 | 20 | + 15' 04" | |
| 12 | Femke Markus | Netherlands | SD Worx | 26 | 91 | + 1h 16' 00" | |
| 13 | Marlen Reusser | Switzerland | SD Worx | 31 | 23 | + 17' 37" | |
| 14 | Marie Schreiber | Luxembourg | SD Worx | 20 | 94 | + 1h 17' 29" | |
| 15 | Elena Cecchini | Italy | SD Worx | 30 | 78 | + 1h 05' 27" | |
| 16 | Blanka Vas | Hungary | SD Worx | 21 | 75 | + 1h 00' 46" | |
| 17 | Demi Vollering | Netherlands | SD Worx | 26 | 2 | + 9" | |
| 21 | Elynor Bäckstedt | Great Britain | Trek–Segafredo | 21 | 115 | + 1h 42' 28" | |
| 22 | Lisa Klein | Germany | Trek–Segafredo | 26 | 106 | + 1h 33' 59" | |
| 23 | Elizabeth Deignan | Great Britain | Trek–Segafredo | 34 | 47 | + 41' 26" | |
| 24 | Ilaria Sanguineti | Italy | Trek–Segafredo | 29 | 118 | + 1h 47' 33" | |
| 25 | Gaia Realini | Italy | Trek–Segafredo | 21 | 3 | + 2' 41" | |
| 26 | Amanda Spratt | Australia | Trek–Segafredo | 35 | 11 | + 8' 21" | |
| 27 | Tayler Wiles | United States | Trek–Segafredo | 33 | 104 | + 1h 29' 24" | |
| 31 | Ricarda Bauernfeind | Germany | Canyon//SRAM | 23 | 5 | + 3' 53" | |
| 32 | Elise Chabbey | Switzerland | Canyon//SRAM | 30 | 24 | + 21' 57" | |
| 33 | Chloé Dygert | United States | Canyon//SRAM | 26 | DNS-6 | – | |
| 34 | Katarzyna Niewiadoma | Poland | Canyon//SRAM | 28 | 10 | + 7' 22" | |
| 35 | Pauliena Rooijakkers | Netherlands | Canyon//SRAM | 29 | 51 | + 46' 06" | |
| 36 | Agnieszka Skalniak-Sójka | Poland | Canyon//SRAM | 23 | 55 | + 48' 20" | |
| 37 | Alice Towers | Great Britain | Canyon//SRAM | 20 | 35 | + 31' 41" | |
| 41 | Loes Adegeest | Netherlands | FDJ–Suez | 26 | 14 | + 11' 35" | |
| 42 | Marta Cavalli | Italy | FDJ–Suez | 25 | 13 | + 10' 40" | |
| 43 | Clara Copponi | France | FDJ–Suez | 24 | 88 | + 1h 10' 41" | |
| 44 | Marie Le Net | France | FDJ–Suez | 23 | 71 | + 55' 42" | |
| 45 | Évita Muzic | France | FDJ–Suez | 23 | 6 | + 4' 24" | |
| 46 | Gladys Verhulst | France | FDJ–Suez | 26 | 69 | + 54' 44" | |
| 47 | Jade Wiel | France | FDJ–Suez | 23 | 32 | + 29' 25" | |
| 51 | Karolina Kumięga | Poland | UAE Team ADQ | 24 | 100 | + 1h 25' 15" | |
| 52 | Olivia Baril | Canada | UAE Team ADQ | 25 | 19 | + 14' 03" | |
| 53 | Eugenia Bujak | Slovenia | UAE Team ADQ | 33 | 76 | + 1h 03' 00" | |
| 54 | Mikayla Harvey | New Zealand | UAE Team ADQ | 24 | 48 | + 41' 27" | |
| 55 | Alena Ivanchenko | | UAE Team ADQ | 19 | 25 | + 22' 43" | |
| 56 | Erica Magnaldi | Italy | UAE Team ADQ | 30 | 8 | + 4' 46" | |
| 57 | Silvia Persico | Italy | UAE Team ADQ | 25 | 12 | + 9' 56" | |
| 61 | Francesca Barale | Italy | Team DSM | 20 | 41 | + 35' 53" | |
| 62 | Léa Curinier | France | Team DSM | 22 | 45 | + 41' 15" | |
| 63 | Charlotte Kool | Netherlands | Team DSM | 23 | DNF-4 | – | |
| 64 | Juliette Labous | France | Team DSM | 24 | 7 | + 4' 27" | |
| 65 | Esmée Peperkamp | Netherlands | Team DSM | 25 | 16 | + 12' 32" | |
| 66 | Maeve Plouffe | Australia | Team DSM | 23 | 123 | + 1h 59' 29" | |
| 67 | Elise Uijen | Netherlands | Team DSM | 19 | 44 | + 38' 41" | |
| 71 | Femke Beuling | Netherlands | EF Education–Tibco–SVB | 23 | 127 | + 2h 07' 03" | |
| 73 | Veronica Ewers | United States | EF Education–Tibco–SVB | 28 | 17 | + 12' 47" | |
| 74 | Kathrin Hammes | Germany | EF Education–Tibco–SVB | 34 | 52 | + 46' 53" | |
| 75 | Sara Poidevin | Canada | EF Education–Tibco–SVB | 26 | 103 | + 1h 28' 27" | |
| 76 | Magdeleine Vallieres | Canada | EF Education–Tibco–SVB | 21 | 60 | + 49' 00" | |
| 77 | Georgia Williams | New Zealand | EF Education–Tibco–SVB | 29 | 39 | + 33' 42" | |
| 81 | Anna Henderson | Great Britain | Team Jumbo–Visma | 24 | 27 | + 25' 52" | |
| 82 | Amber Kraak | Netherlands | Team Jumbo–Visma | 28 | 22 | + 17' 30" | |
| 83 | Coryn Labecki | United States | Team Jumbo–Visma | 30 | 112 | + 1h 40' 43" | |
| 84 | Riejanne Markus | Netherlands | Team Jumbo–Visma | 28 | 4 | + 3' 36" | |
| 85 | Noemi Rüegg | Switzerland | Team Jumbo–Visma | 22 | 68 | + 53' 09" | |
| 86 | Eva van Agt | Netherlands | Team Jumbo–Visma | 26 | 42 | + 37' 40" | |
| 87 | Marianne Vos | Netherlands | Team Jumbo–Visma | 35 | 26 | + 22' 54" | |
| 91 | Kristen Faulkner | United States | Team Jayco–AlUla | 30 | 28 | + 27' 22" | |
| 92 | Teniel Campbell | Trinidad and Tobago | Team Jayco–AlUla | 25 | 107 | + 1h 35' 13" | |
| 93 | Georgie Howe | Australia | Team Jayco–AlUla | 29 | 101 | + 1h 25' 29" | |
| 94 | Nina Kessler | Netherlands | Team Jayco–AlUla | 34 | DNS-5 | – | |
| 95 | Amber Pate | Australia | Team Jayco–AlUla | 28 | 49 | + 42' 51" | |
| 96 | Ane Santesteban | Spain | Team Jayco–AlUla | 32 | 18 | + 13' 07" | |
| 97 | Urška Žigart | Slovenia | Team Jayco–AlUla | 26 | 40 | + 34' 10" | |
| 101 | Caroline Andersson | Sweden | Liv Racing TeqFind | 21 | 33 | + 30' 03" | |
| 102 | Rachele Barbieri | Italy | Liv Racing TeqFind | 26 | DNS-4 | – | |
| 103 | Mavi García | Spain | Liv Racing TeqFind | 39 | 9 | + 6' 31" | |
| 104 | Tereza Neumanová | Czechia | Liv Racing TeqFind | 24 | 90 | + 1h 15' 56" | |
| 105 | Katia Ragusa | Italy | Liv Racing TeqFind | 25 | 79 | + 1h 06' 01" | |
| 106 | Silke Smulders | Netherlands | Liv Racing TeqFind | 22 | 63 | + 50' 10" | |
| 107 | Quinty Ton | Netherlands | Liv Racing TeqFind | 24 | 57 | + 48' 43" | |
| 111 | Simone Boilard | Canada | St. Michel–Mavic–Auber93 | 22 | 66 | + 51' 51" | |
| 112 | Coralie Demay | France | St. Michel–Mavic–Auber93 | 30 | 31 | + 29' 00" | |
| 113 | Camille Fahy | France | St. Michel–Mavic–Auber93 | 19 | DNF-5 | – | |
| 114 | Roxane Fournier | France | St. Michel–Mavic–Auber93 | 31 | DNS-5 | – | |
| 115 | Dilyxine Miermont | France | St. Michel–Mavic–Auber93 | 22 | 36 | + 32' 11" | |
| 116 | Olivia Onesti | France | St. Michel–Mavic–Auber93 | 19 | 95 | + 1h 18' 18" | |
| 117 | Margot Pompanon | France | St. Michel–Mavic–Auber93 | 26 | 83 | + 1h 08' 49" | |
| 121 | Claire Steels | Great Britain | Israel Premier Tech Roland | 36 | 15 | + 11' 44" | |
| 122 | Tamara Dronova | | Israel Premier Tech Roland | 29 | 29 | + 28' 11" | |
| 123 | Sofia Collinelli | Italy | Israel Premier Tech Roland | 21 | DNS-5 | – | |
| 124 | Elizabeth Stannard | Australia | Israel Premier Tech Roland | 25 | 43 | + 38' 20" | |
| 125 | Anna Kiesenhofer | Austria | Israel Premier Tech Roland | 32 | 59 | + 48' 54" | |
| 126 | Elena Pirrone | Italy | Israel Premier Tech Roland | 24 | 93 | + 1h 17' 01" | |
| 127 | Hannah Buch | Germany | Israel Premier Tech Roland | 20 | 114 | + 1h 40' 59" | |
| 131 | Stine Dale | Norway | Team Coop–Hitec Products | 24 | 77 | + 1h 03' 20" | |
| 132 | Georgia Danford | New Zealand | Team Coop–Hitec Products | 24 | 120 | + 1h 51' 15" | |
| 133 | Sigrid Ytterhus Haugset | Norway | Team Coop–Hitec Products | 24 | 53 | + 47' 22" | |
| 134 | Kerry Jonker | South Africa | Team Coop–Hitec Products | 26 | DNF-5 | – | |
| 135 | Tiril Jørgensen | Norway | Team Coop–Hitec Products | 22 | DNF-5 | – | |
| 136 | Mari Hole Mohr | Norway | Team Coop–Hitec Products | 22 | DNF-4 | – | |
| 137 | Josie Nelson | Great Britain | Team Coop–Hitec Products | 21 | DNS-7 | – | |
| 141 | Andrea Alzate | Colombia | Eneicat–CMTeam–Seguros Deportivos | 26 | 54 | + 47' 24" | |
| 142 | Isabel Martin | Spain | Eneicat–CMTeam–Seguros Deportivos | 24 | 108 | + 1h 37' 06" | |
| 143 | Laura Ruiz Pérez | Spain | Eneicat–CMTeam–Seguros Deportivos | 18 | 85 | + 1h 09' 07" | |
| 144 | Lucia Ruiz Pérez | Spain | Eneicat–CMTeam–Seguros Deportivos | 18 | 38 | + 33' 18" | |
| 145 | Maryna Varenyk | Ukraine | Eneicat–CMTeam–Seguros Deportivos | 22 | 109 | + 1h 39' 00" | |
| 146 | Carolina Vargas | Colombia | Eneicat–CMTeam–Seguros Deportivos | 20 | 37 | + 32' 30" | |
| 147 | Aranza Valentina Villalón | Chile | Eneicat–CMTeam–Seguros Deportivos | 27 | 64 | + 50' 28" | |
| 151 | Daniela Campos | Portugal | Bizkaia–Durango | 21 | DNS-4 | – | |
| 152 | Lucía González | Spain | Bizkaia–Durango | 32 | 50 | + 43' 30" | |
| 153 | Ana Vitória Magalhães | Brazil | Bizkaia–Durango | 22 | 81 | + 1h 07' 07" | |
| 154 | Eukene Larrarte | Spain | Bizkaia–Durango | 24 | 111 | + 1h 40' 36" | |
| 155 | Irene Mendez | Spain | Bizkaia–Durango | 30 | 61 | + 49' 58" | |
| 156 | Sofia Rodríguez | Spain | Bizkaia–Durango | 23 | 117 | + 1h 45' 28" | |
| 157 | Catalina Anais Soto | Chile | Bizkaia–Durango | 22 | 80 | + 1h 06' 21" | |
| 161 | Iurani Blanco | Spain | Laboral Kutxa–Fundación Euskadi | 25 | 56 | + 48' 41" | |
| 162 | Idoia Eraso | Spain | Laboral Kutxa–Fundación Euskadi | 21 | 67 | + 52' 17" | |
| 163 | Ariana Gilabert | Spain | Laboral Kutxa–Fundación Euskadi | 23 | 65 | + 51' 37" | |
| 164 | Usoa Ostolaza | Spain | Laboral Kutxa–Fundación Euskadi | 25 | DNS-5 | – | |
| 165 | Nadia Quagliotto | Italy | Laboral Kutxa–Fundación Euskadi | 26 | 30 | + 28' 30" | |
| 166 | Laura Rodriguez | Spain | Laboral Kutxa–Fundación Euskadi | 23 | DNF-6 | – | |
| 167 | Alba Teruel | Spain | Laboral Kutxa–Fundación Euskadi | 26 | 58 | + 48' 45" | |
| 171 | Letizia Brufani | Italy | Bepink | 21 | 113 | + 1h 40' 50" | |
| 172 | Andrea Casagranda | Italy | Bepink | 18 | 92 | + 1h 16' 32" | |
| 173 | Nora Jenčušová | Slovakia | Bepink | 21 | 98 | + 1h 23' 04" | |
| 174 | Prisca Savi | Italy | Bepink | 21 | DNF-3 | – | |
| 175 | Giorgia Vettorello | Italy | Bepink | 22 | 70 | + 55' 12" | |
| 176 | Matilde Vitillo | Italy | Bepink | 22 | 89 | + 1h 13' 44" | |
| 177 | Silvia Zanardi | Italy | Bepink | 23 | 82 | + 1h 07' 49" | |
| 181 | Valeria Valgonen | | Massi–Tactic | 20 | 46 | + 41' 22" | |
| 182 | Cécile Lejeune | France | Massi–Tactic | 25 | DNF-2 | – | |
| 183 | Aurela Nerlo | Poland | Massi–Tactic | 25 | DNF-6 | – | |
| 184 | Adèle Normand | Canada | Massi–Tactic | 21 | 72 | + 56' 52" | |
| 185 | Miryam Maritza Nuñez | Ecuador | Massi–Tactic | 28 | 110 | + 1h 39' 46" | |
| 186 | Patricia Ortega | Spain | Massi–Tactic | 34 | 105 | + 1h 31' 28" | |
| 187 | Vera Villaça | Portugal | Massi–Tactic | 25 | 97 | + 1h 21' 29" | |
| 191 | Isabella Maria Escalera | Spain | Soltec Team | 19 | DNF-5 | – | |
| 192 | Manuela Mureșan | Romania | Soltec Team | 39 | 125 | + 2h 03' 09" | |
| 193 | Andrea Soldevilla | Spain | Soltec Team | 26 | DNF-3 | – | |
| 194 | Fiona Mangan | Ireland | Soltec Team | 26 | 99 | + 1h 23' 42" | |
| 195 | Mariana Libano | Portugal | Soltec Team | 19 | DNF-3 | – | |
| 196 | Romana Slavinec | Austria | Soltec Team | 32 | DNF-5 | – | |
| 197 | Liubov Malervein | | Soltec Team | 20 | 121 | + 1h 51' 53" | |
| 201 | Mercedes Carmona | Spain | Cantabria Deporte–Río Miera | 40 | 87 | + 1h 10' 06" | |
| 202 | Marina Garau | Spain | Cantabria Deporte–Río Miera | 20 | 122 | + 1h 58' 18" | |
| 203 | Belen Gonzalez | Spain | Cantabria Deporte–Río Miera | 40 | DNF-5 | – | |
| 204 | Susana Perez | Spain | Cantabria Deporte–Río Miera | 21 | 86 | + 1h 10' 00" | |
| 205 | Andrea Perez | Spain | Cantabria Deporte–Río Miera | 19 | DNF-6 | – | |
| 206 | Beatriz Roxo | Portugal | Cantabria Deporte–Río Miera | 19 | DNF-5 | – | |
| 207 | Andrea Velasco | Spain | Cantabria Deporte–Río Miera | 19 | DNF-5 | – | |
| 211 | Ariadna Gutiérrez | Mexico | Team Farto–BTC | 31 | 74 | + 59' 09" | |
| 212 | Mandana Dehghan | Iran | Team Farto–BTC | 32 | 116 | + 1h 42' 30" | |
| 213 | Agata Flis | Poland | Team Farto–BTC | 27 | 126 | + 2h 04' 23" | |
| 214 | Lina Svarinska | Latvia | Team Farto–BTC | 22 | DNF-5 | – | |
| 215 | Maria del Pilar Jimenez Martinez | Spain | Team Farto–BTC | 21 | DNF-5 | – | |
| 216 | Daria Fomina | | Team Farto–BTC | 21 | 96 | + 1h 20' 58" | |
| 217 | Azulde Britz | South Africa | Team Farto–BTC | 22 | DNF-5 | – | |
| 221 | Maria Banlles | Spain | Sopela Women's Team | 22 | DNF-6 | – | |
| 222 | Nahia Imaz | Spain | Sopela Women's Team | 18 | DNF-3 | – | |
| 223 | Sarah Kastenhuber | Germany | Sopela Women's Team | 20 | 124 | + 2h 02' 40" | |
| 224 | Allison Mrugal | United States | Sopela Women's Team | 26 | 119 | + 1h 49' 03" | |
| 225 | Muskilda Oloriz | Spain | Sopela Women's Team | 41 | OTL-1 | – | |
| 226 | Laia Puigdefabregas | Spain | Sopela Women's Team | 18 | DNF-6 | – | |
| 227 | Augustina Reyes | Uruguay | Sopela Women's Team | 24 | DNF-6 | – | |

=== By team ===
(Spain) Movistar Team (MOV)
| No. | Rider | Pos. |
|---|---|---|
| 1 | Aude Biannic (FRA) | 84 |
| 2 | Emma Norsgaard (DEN) | 73 |
| 3 | Liane Lippert (GER) | 21 |
| 4 | Floortje Mackaij (NED) | 62 |
| 5 | Lourdes Oyarbide (ESP) | 102 |
| 6 | Paula Andrea Patiño (COL) | 34 |
| 7 | Annemiek van Vleuten (NED) | 1 |

(Netherlands) SD Worx (SDW)
| No. | Rider | Pos. |
|---|---|---|
| 11 | Niamh Fisher-Black (NZL) | 20 |
| 12 | Femke Markus (NED) | 91 |
| 13 | Marlen Reusser (SUI) | 23 |
| 14 | Marie Schreiber (LUX) | 94 |
| 15 | Elena Cecchini (ITA) | 78 |
| 16 | Blanka Vas (HUN) | 75 |
| 17 | Demi Vollering (NED) | 2 |

(United States) Trek–Segafredo (TFS)
| No. | Rider | Pos. |
|---|---|---|
| 21 | Elynor Bäckstedt (GBR) | 115 |
| 22 | Lisa Klein (GER) | 106 |
| 23 | Elizabeth Deignan (GBR) | 47 |
| 24 | Ilaria Sanguineti (ITA) | 118 |
| 25 | Gaia Realini (ITA) | 3 |
| 26 | Amanda Spratt (AUS) | 11 |
| 27 | Tayler Wiles (USA) | 104 |

(Germany) Canyon//SRAM (CSR)
| No. | Rider | Pos. |
|---|---|---|
| 31 | Ricarda Bauernfeind (GER) | 5 |
| 32 | Elise Chabbey (SUI) | 24 |
| 33 | Chloé Dygert (USA) | DNS-6 |
| 34 | Katarzyna Niewiadoma (POL) | 10 |
| 35 | Pauliena Rooijakkers (NED) | 51 |
| 36 | Agnieszka Skalniak-Sójka (POL) | 55 |
| 37 | Alice Towers (GBR) | 35 |

(France) FDJ–Suez (FST)
| No. | Rider | Pos. |
|---|---|---|
| 41 | Loes Adegeest (NED) | 14 |
| 42 | Marta Cavalli (ITA) | 13 |
| 43 | Clara Copponi (FRA) | 88 |
| 44 | Marie Le Net (FRA) | 71 |
| 45 | Évita Muzic (FRA) | 6 |
| 46 | Gladys Verhulst (FRA) | 69 |
| 47 | Jade Wiel (FRA) | 32 |

(United Arab Emirates) UAE Team ADQ (UAD)
| No. | Rider | Pos. |
|---|---|---|
| 51 | Karolina Kumięga (POL) | 100 |
| 52 | Olivia Baril (CAN) | 19 |
| 53 | Eugenia Bujak (SLO) | 76 |
| 54 | Mikayla Harvey (NZL) | 48 |
| 55 | Alena Ivanchenko | 25 |
| 56 | Erica Magnaldi (ITA) | 8 |
| 57 | Silvia Persico (ITA) | 12 |

(Netherlands) Team DSM (DSM)
| No. | Rider | Pos. |
|---|---|---|
| 61 | Francesca Barale (ITA) | 41 |
| 62 | Léa Curinier (FRA) | 45 |
| 63 | Charlotte Kool (NED) | DNF-4 |
| 64 | Juliette Labous (FRA) | 7 |
| 65 | Esmée Peperkamp (NED) | 16 |
| 66 | Maeve Plouffe (AUS) | 123 |
| 67 | Elise Uijen (NED) | 44 |

(United States) EF Education–Tibco–SVB (TIB)
| No. | Rider | Pos. |
|---|---|---|
| 71 | Femke Beuling (NED) | 127 |
| 73 | Veronica Ewers (USA) | 17 |
| 74 | Kathrin Hammes (GER) | 52 |
| 75 | Sara Poidevin (ITA) | 103 |
| 76 | Magdeleine Vallieres (CAN) | 60 |
| 77 | Georgia Williams (NZL) | 39 |

(Netherlands) Team Jumbo–Visma (JVW)
| No. | Rider | Pos. |
|---|---|---|
| 81 | Anna Henderson (GBR) | 27 |
| 82 | Amber Kraak (NED) | 22 |
| 83 | Coryn Labecki (USA) | 112 |
| 84 | Riejanne Markus (NED) | 4 |
| 85 | Noemi Rüegg (SUI) | 68 |
| 86 | Eva van Agt (NED) | 42 |
| 87 | Marianne Vos (NED) | 26 |

(Australia) Team Jayco–AlUla (JAY)
| No. | Rider | Pos. |
|---|---|---|
| 91 | Kristen Faulkner (USA) | 28 |
| 92 | Teniel Campbell (TRI) | 107 |
| 93 | Georgie Howe (AUS) | 101 |
| 94 | Nina Kessler (NED) | DNS-5 |
| 95 | Amber Pate (AUS) | 49 |
| 96 | Ane Santesteban (ESP) | 18 |
| 97 | Urška Žigart (SLO) | 40 |

(Netherlands) Liv Racing TeqFind (DSB)
| No. | Rider | Pos. |
|---|---|---|
| 101 | Caroline Andersson (SWE) | 33 |
| 102 | Rachele Barbieri (ITA) | DNS-4 |
| 103 | Mavi García (ESP) | 9 |
| 104 | Tereza Neumanová (CZE) | 90 |
| 105 | Katia Ragusa (ITA) | 79 |
| 106 | Silke Smulders (NED) | 63 |
| 107 | Quinty Ton (NED) | 57 |

(France) St. Michel–Mavic–Auber93 (AUB)
| No. | Rider | Pos. |
|---|---|---|
| 111 | Simone Boilard (CAN) | 66 |
| 112 | Coralie Demay (FRA) | 31 |
| 113 | Camille Fahy (FRA) | DNF-5 |
| 114 | Roxane Fournier (FRA) | DNS-5 |
| 115 | Dilyxine Miermont (FRA) | 36 |
| 116 | Olivia Onesti (FRA) | 95 |
| 117 | Margot Pompanon (FRA) | 83 |

(Switzerland) Israel Premier Tech Roland (CGS)
| No. | Rider | Pos. |
|---|---|---|
| 121 | Claire Steels (GBR) | 15 |
| 122 | Tamara Dronova | 29 |
| 123 | Sofia Collinelli (ITA) | DNS-5 |
| 124 | Elizabeth Stannard (AUS) | 43 |
| 125 | Anna Kiesenhofer (AUT) | 59 |
| 126 | Elena Pirrone (ITA) | 93 |
| 127 | Hannah Buch (GER) | 114 |

(Norway) Team Coop–Hitec Products (HPU)
| No. | Rider | Pos. |
|---|---|---|
| 131 | Stine Dale (NOR) | 77 |
| 132 | Georgia Danford (NZL) | 120 |
| 133 | Sigrid Ytterhus Haugset (NOR) | 53 |
| 134 | Kerry Jonker (RSA) | DNF-5 |
| 135 | Tiril Jørgensen (NOR) | DNF-5 |
| 136 | Mari Hole Mohr (NOR) | DNF-4 |
| 137 | Josie Nelson (GBR) | DNS-7 |

(Spain) Eneicat–CMTeam–Seguros Deportivos (EIC)
| No. | Rider | Pos. |
|---|---|---|
| 141 | Andrea Alzate (COL) | 54 |
| 142 | Isabel Martin (ESP) | 108 |
| 143 | Laura Ruiz Pérez (ESP) | 85 |
| 144 | Lucia Ruiz Pérez (ESP) | 38 |
| 145 | Maryna Varenyk (UKR) | 109 |
| 146 | Carolina Vargas (COL) | 37 |
| 147 | Aranza Valentina Villalón (CHI) | 64 |

(Spain) Bizkaia–Durango (BDU)
| No. | Rider | Pos. |
|---|---|---|
| 151 | Daniela Campos (POR) | DNS-4 |
| 152 | Lucía González (ESP) | 50 |
| 153 | Ana Vitória Magalhães (BRA) | 81 |
| 154 | Eukene Larrarte (ESP) | 111 |
| 155 | Irene Mendez (ESP) | 61 |
| 156 | Sofia Rodríguez (ESP) | 117 |
| 157 | Catalina Anais Soto (CHI) | 80 |

(Spain) Laboral Kutxa–Fundación Euskadi (LKF)
| No. | Rider | Pos. |
|---|---|---|
| 161 | Iurani Blanco (ESP) | 56 |
| 162 | Idoia Eraso (ESP) | 67 |
| 163 | Ariana Gilabert (ESP) | 65 |
| 164 | Usoa Ostolaza (ESP) | DNS-5 |
| 165 | Nadia Quagliotto (ITA) | 30 |
| 166 | Laura Rodriguez (ESP) | DNF-6 |
| 167 | Alba Teruel (ESP) | 58 |

(Italy) Bepink (BPK)
| No. | Rider | Pos. |
|---|---|---|
| 171 | Letizia Brufani (ITA) | 113 |
| 172 | Andrea Casagranda (ITA) | 92 |
| 173 | Nora Jenčušová (SVK) | 98 |
| 174 | Prisca Savi (ITA) | DNF-3 |
| 175 | Giorgia Vettorello (ITA) | 70 |
| 176 | Matilde Vitillo (ITA) | 89 |
| 177 | Silvia Zanardi (ITA) | 82 |

(Spain) Massi–Tactic (MAT)
| No. | Rider | Pos. |
|---|---|---|
| 181 | Valeria Valgonen | 46 |
| 182 | Cécile Lejeune (FRA) | DNF-2 |
| 183 | Aurela Nerlo (POL) | DNF-6 |
| 184 | Adèle Normand (CAN) | 72 |
| 185 | Miryam Maritza Nuñez (ECU) | 110 |
| 186 | Patricia Ortega (ESP) | 105 |
| 187 | Vera Villaça (POR) | 97 |

(Spain) Soltec Team (STC)
| No. | Rider | Pos. |
|---|---|---|
| 191 | Isabella Maria Escalera (ESP) | DNF-5 |
| 192 | Manuela Mureșan (ROU) | 125 |
| 193 | Andrea Soldevilla (ESP) | DNF-3 |
| 194 | Fiona Mangan (IRL) | 99 |
| 195 | Mariana Libano (POR) | DNF-3 |
| 196 | Romana Slavinec (AUT) | DNF-5 |
| 197 | Liubov Malervein | 121 |

(Spain) Cantabria Deporte–Río Miera (CDR)
| No. | Rider | Pos. |
|---|---|---|
| 201 | Mercedes Carmona (ESP) | 87 |
| 202 | Marina Garau (ESP) | 122 |
| 203 | Belen Gonzalez (ESP) | DNF-5 |
| 204 | Susana Perez (ESP) | 86 |
| 205 | Andrea Perez (ESP) | DNF-6 |
| 206 | Beatriz Roxo (POR) | DNF-5 |
| 207 | Andrea Velasco (ESP) | DNF-5 |

(Spain) Team Farto–BTC (FBW)
| No. | Rider | Pos. |
|---|---|---|
| 211 | Ariadna Gutiérrez (MEX) | 74 |
| 212 | Mandana Dehghan (IRN) | 116 |
| 213 | Agata Flis (POL) | 126 |
| 214 | Lina Svarinska (LVA) | DNF-5 |
| 215 | Maria del Pilar Jimenez Martinez (ESP) | DNF-5 |
| 216 | Daria Fomina | 96 |
| 217 | Azulde Britz (RSA) | DNF-5 |

(Spain) Sopela Women's Team (SWT)
| No. | Rider | Pos. |
|---|---|---|
| 221 | Maria Banlles (ESP) | DNF-6 |
| 222 | Nahia Imaz (ESP) | DNF-3 |
| 223 | Sarah Kastenhuber (GER) | 124 |
| 224 | Allison Mrugal (USA) | 119 |
| 225 | Muskilda Oloriz (ESP) | OTL-1 |
| 226 | Laia Puigdefabregas (ESP) | DNF-6 |
| 227 | Augustina Reyes (URU) | DNF-6 |

=== By nationality ===
| Country | No. of riders | Finished | Stage wins |
|---|---|---|---|
| Australia | 5 | 5 | |
| Austria | 2 | 1 | |
| Brazil | 1 | 1 | |
| Canada | 5 | 5 | |
| Chile | 2 | 2 | |
| Colombia | 3 | 3 | |
| Czechia | 1 | 1 | |
| Denmark | 1 | 1 | |
| Ecuador | 1 | 1 | |
| France | 15 | 12 | |
| Germany | 6 | 6 | |
| Great Britain | 6 | 5 | |
| Hungary | 1 | 1 | |
| Iran | 1 | 1 | |
| Ireland | 1 | 1 | |
| Italy | 18 | 15 | 1 (Gaia Realini) |
| Latvia | 1 | 0 | |
| Luxembourg | 1 | 1 | |
| Mexico | 1 | 1 | |
| Netherlands | 17 | 15 | 5 (Charlotte Kool, Demi Vollering x2, Marianne Vos x2) |
| New Zealand | 4 | 4 | |
| Norway | 4 | 2 | |
| Poland | 5 | 4 | |
| Portugal | 4 | 1 | |
| Romania | 1 | 1 | |
| Slovakia | 1 | 1 | |
| Slovenia | 2 | 2 | |
| South Africa | 2 | 0 | |
| Spain | 30 | 18 | |
| Sweden | 1 | 1 | |
| Switzerland | 3 | 3 | |
| Trinidad and Tobago | 1 | 1 | |
| Ukraine | 1 | 1 | |
| United States | 6 | 5 | |
| Uruguay | 1 | 0 | |
| | 5 | 5 | |
| Total | 160 | 127 | 6 |
