= 2024 national road cycling championships =

The 2024 national road cycling championships are being held throughout the year and are organised by the UCI member federations. They began in Australia with the Australian National Time Trial Championships events on 3 January.

== Jerseys ==
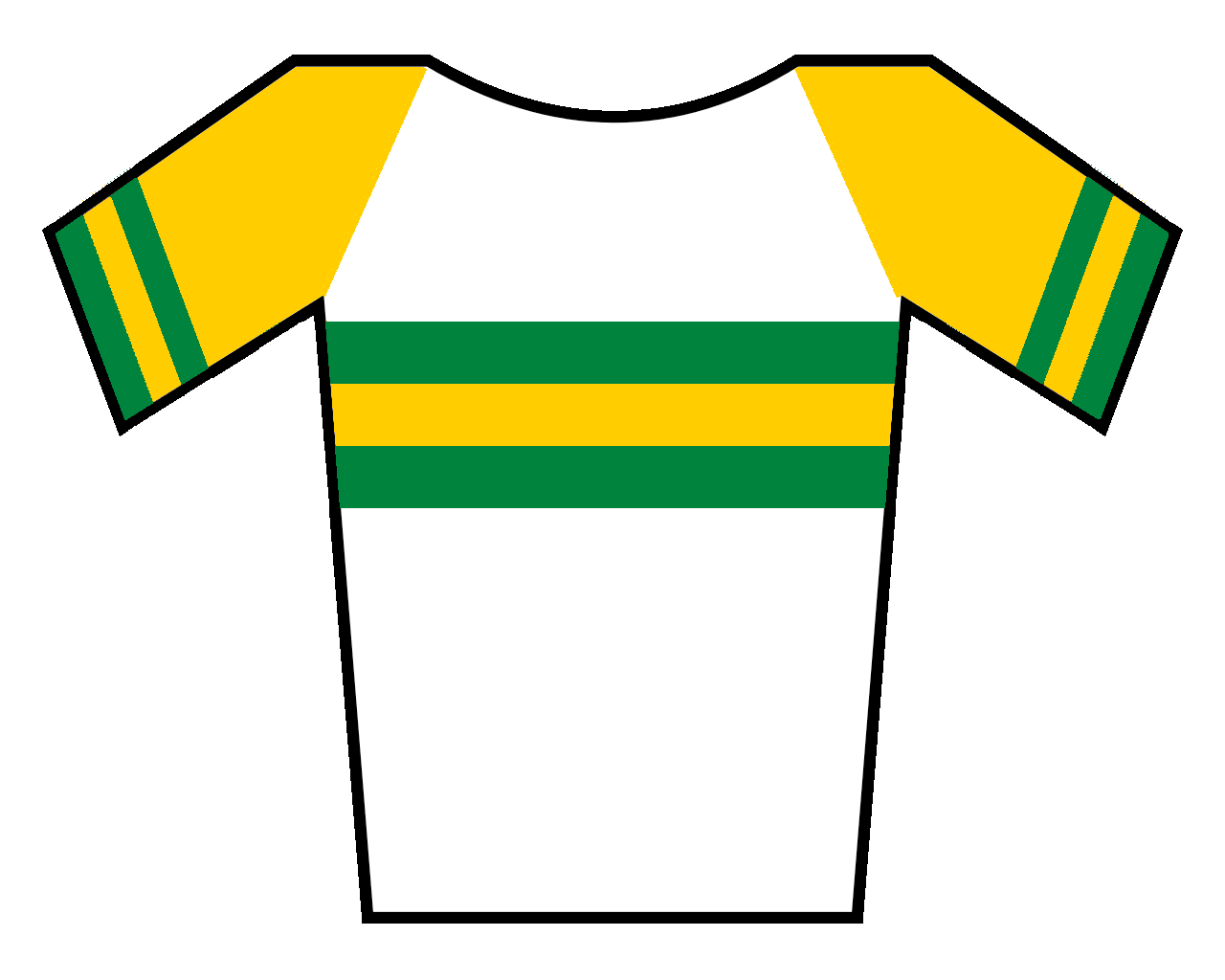
Australian Champion

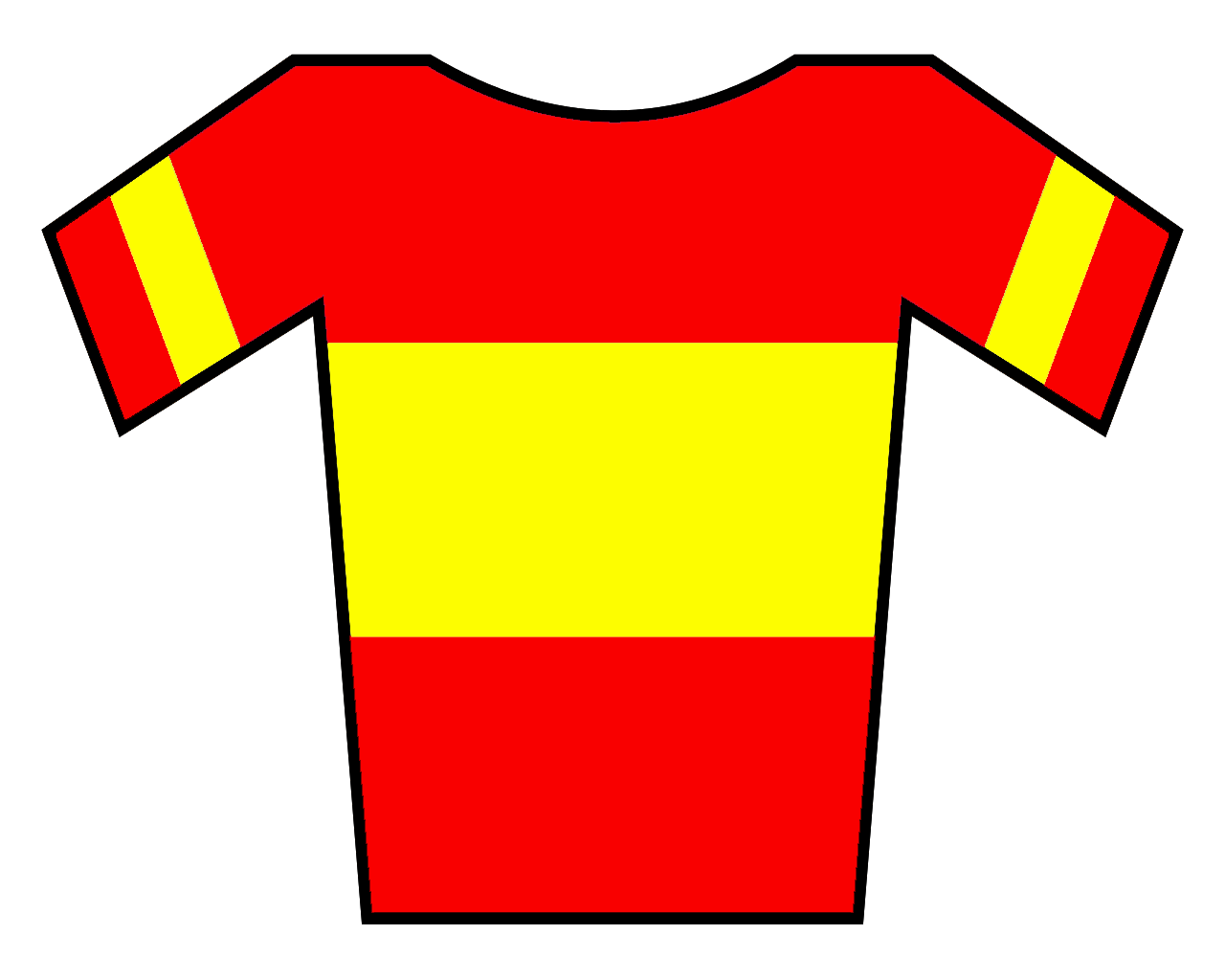
Spanish Champion

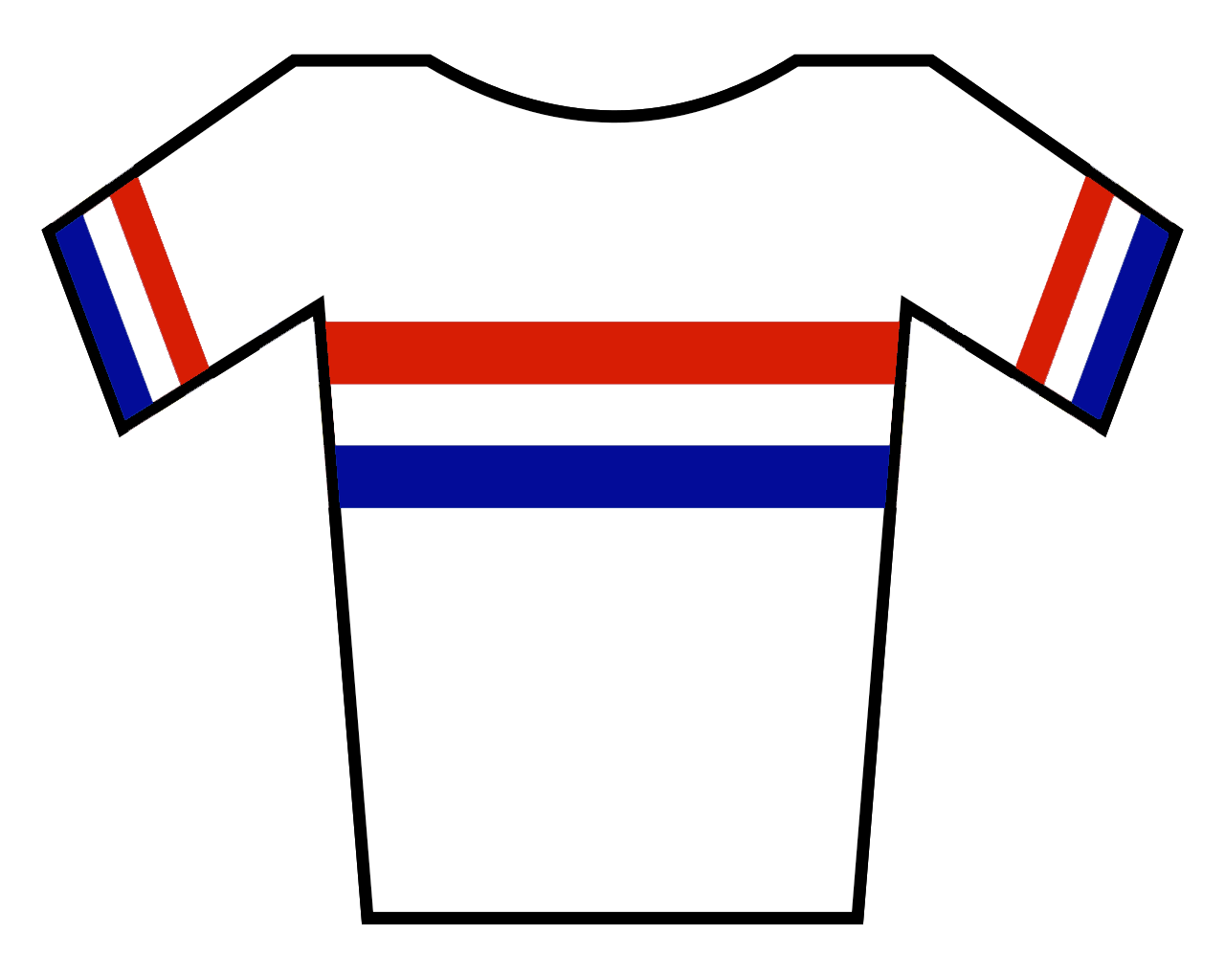
British
Champion

The winner of each national championship wears the national jersey in all their races for the next year in the respective discipline, apart from the World Championships and the Olympics, or unless they are wearing a classification leader's jersey in a stage race. Most national champion jerseys tend to represent a country's flag or use the colours from it, like the Spanish and British jerseys, respectively. Jerseys may also feature traditional sporting colours of a country that are not derived from a national flag, such as the green and gold jerseys of Australian national champions.

== 2024 champions ==
=== Men's Elite ===
Country	Men's Elite Road Race Champion	Road Race Champion's Team	Men's Elite Time Trial Champion	Time Trial Champion's Team
Albania	Olsian Velia	Tirana Team	Olsian Velia	Tirana Team
Algeria	Azzedine Lagab	Madar Pro Cycling Team	Azzedine Lagab	Madar Pro Cycling Team
Angola	Igor Silva	JT300	Dário António	Equipa de Ciclismo Inter Clube
Antigua and Barbuda	Jyme Bridges	Albiono Pro Cycling	Robert Marsh	
Argentina	Daniel Juárez	Chimbas te Quiero	Sergio Fredes	
Australia	Luke Plapp	Team Jayco–AlUla	Luke Plapp	Team Jayco–AlUla
Austria	Alexander Hajek	Bora–Hansgrohe	Felix Großschartner	UAE Team Emirates
Azerbaijan	Musa Mikayilzade	Sakarya BB Pro Team	Musa Mikayilzade	Sakarya BB Pro Team
Bahrain	Ahmed Naser	CTF Victorious	Ahmed Naser	CTF Victorious
Barbados	Joshua Kelly	City Bikes Team	Jacob Kelly	
Belarus	Yauhen Sobal	Chengdu Cycling Team		
Belgium	Arnaud De Lie	Lotto–Dstny	Tim Wellens	UAE Team Emirates
Belize	Cory Williams	Miami Blazers	Cory Williams	Miami Blazers
Benin	Ricardo Sodjede			
Bermuda	Kaden Hopkins	Vendée U Pays de la Loire	Kaden Hopkins	Vendée U Pays de la Loire
Bolivia	Alexandre Junior Donaire	Pío Rico–Alcaldía La Vega	Eduardo Moyata	Pío Rico–Alcaldía La Vega
Bosnia and Herzegovina	Vedad Karić	Kamen Pazin	Husein Selimovic	BK Tuzla
Brazil	Roberto Pinheiro	UniFunvic–Pindamonhangaba	Diego Mendes	
British Virgin Islands	Calvin Smith	Albiono Pro Cycling	Philippe Leroy	
Bulgaria	Georgi Lumparov	Hemus Troyan	Emil Stoynev	
Burkina Faso	Paul Daumont	Guidon Sprinter Canalien Cycling Team		
Canada	Michael Woods	Israel–Premier Tech	Pier-André Côté	Israel Premier Tech Academy
Cameroon	Clovis Kamzong	SNH Vélo Club		
Cape Verde	Gilberto Monteiro Dias		Eliezer Soares	
Cayman Islands	Christopher Bodden		Peter De Wit	
Chile	Francisco Kotsakis	Stamina Racing	José Luis Rodríguez Aguilar	Plus Performance–Solutos
China	Hao Ran	Hainan Wuzhishan Cycling Team	Miao Chengshuo	
Colombia	Alejandro Osorio	GW Erco Shimano	Daniel Martínez	Bora–Hansgrohe
Costa Rica	Daniel Bonilla	Team Colono Bikestation Kölbi	Jason Huertas	Lasal Cocinas–Craega
Croatia	Viktor Potočki	Ljubljana Gusto Santic	Nicolas Gojković	Adria Mobil
Cuba	Jose Alberto Dominguez	La Habana	Yariel De León	
Cyprus	Andreas Miltiadis	Terengganu Cycling Team	Andreas Miltiadis	Terengganu Cycling Team
Czech Republic	Tomáš Přidal	Elkov–Kasper	Mathias Vacek	Lidl–Trek
Denmark	Rasmus Søjberg Pedersen	Decathlon–AG2R La Mondiale Development Team	Mattias Skjelmose	Lidl–Trek
Dominican Republic	Rudy Germoso	Verrazano–San Cristobal	Junior Marte	Verrazano–San Cristobal
Ecuador	Jhonatan Narváez	INEOS Grenadiers	Richard Carapaz	EF Education–EasyPost
Egypt	Hassan Elseify			
El Salvador	Josué Hurtado	Aldosa Jalapa	Brandon Rodríguez	Copeba–Muni Toto
Eritrea	Natnael Tesfatsion	Lidl–Trek	Amanuel Ghebreigzabhier	Lidl–Trek
Estonia	Norman Vahtra	Van Rysel–Roubaix	Rein Taaramäe	Intermarché–Wanty
Ethiopia	Negasi Haylu Abreha	Q36.5 Pro Cycling Team	Mulu Hailemichael	Caja Rural–Seguros RGA
Finland	Jaakko Hänninen	Decathlon–AG2R La Mondiale	Trond Larsen	IK-32
France	Paul Lapeira	Decathlon–AG2R La Mondiale	Bruno Armirail	Decathlon–AG2R La Mondiale
Georgia	Avtandil Piranishvili		Avtandil Piranishvili	
Germany	Marco Brenner	Tudor Pro Cycling Team	Nils Politt	UAE Team Emirates
Grenada	Red Walters	X-Speed United	Red Walters	X-Speed United
Guam			Dan Aponik	EuroCyclingTrips–Yoeleo
Guatemala	Sergio Chumil	Burgos BH	Manuel Rodas	Decorabaños–AC Quetzaltenango
Honduras	Diler Martinez	Team Probikes Cemplus	Fredd Matute	Miami Falcons
Hong Kong	Mow Ching Yin	HKSI Pro Cycling Team	Vincent Lau Wan-yau	Roojai Insurance
Hungary	Attila Valter	Visma–Lease a Bike	Barnabás Peák	Adria Mobil
Iceland	Kristinn Jónsson	HFR	Ingvar Ómarsson	Umf.Breiðablik
India	Manjeet Kumar	Railway Sports	Naveen John	Karnataka Cycling Team
Indonesia	Terry Kusuma	Kelapa Gading Bikers	Aiman Cahyadi	Terengganu Cycling Team
Iran	Hasan Seyfollahifard		Saeid Safarzadeh	Tianyoude Hotel Cycling Team
Ireland	Darren Rafferty	EF Education–EasyPost	Eddie Dunbar	Team Jayco–AlUla
Israel	Oded Kogut	Israel–Premier Tech	Oded Kogut	Israel–Premier Tech
Italy	Alberto Bettiol	EF Education–EasyPost	Filippo Ganna	INEOS Grenadiers
Jamaica	Andrew Ramsay	Elevation Cycling Club	Oshane Williams	Cornwall Cycling Club
Japan	Marino Kobayashi	Matrix Powertag	Sohei Kaneko	Gunma–Grifin Racing Team
Kazakhstan	Dmitriy Gruzdev	Astana Qazaqstan Team	Dmitriy Gruzdev	Astana Qazaqstan Team
Kosovo	Blerton Nuha	KC Kastrioti Ferizaj	Albion Ymeri	K.C.Prishtina
Laos	Ariya Phounsavath	Roojai Insurance	Ariya Phounsavath	Roojai Insurance
Latvia	Emīls Liepiņš	Team dsm–firmenich PostNL	Alekss Krasts	Voltas–Tartu 2024 by CCN
Lebanon	Georges Iskandar			
Lithuania	Venantas Lašinis	Energus Cycling Team	Venantas Lašinis	Energus Cycling Team
Luxembourg	Kevin Geniets	Groupama–FDJ	Arthur Kluckers	Tudor Pro Cycling Team
Malaysia	Nur Amirul Fakhruddin Mazuki	Terengganu Cycling Team	Nur Aiman Rosli	Terengganu Cycling Team
Malta	Aidan Buttigieg	St George Continental Cycling Team		
Mexico	Edgar Cadena	Petrolike	Edgar Cadena	Petrolike
Montenegro	Aleksandar Radunović	BK Dinamo Zagreb	Aleksandar Radunović	BK Dinamo Zagreb
Mauritius	Christopher Lagane	Team MCB	Christopher Lagane	Team MCB
Moldova	Andrei Sobennicov		Daniel Babanschi	
Mongolia	Bilguunjargal Erdenebat	Ferei Quick-Panda Podium Mongolia Team	Jambaljamts Sainbayar	Burgos BH
Morocco	El Houcaine Sabbahi	Qatar Pro Team	Adil El Arbaoui	AVC Khourigba
Namibia	Alex Miller	Team Cathy	Drikus Coetzee	Hollard Insurance
Netherlands	Dylan Groenewegen	Team Jayco–AlUla	Daan Hoole	Lidl–Trek
New Zealand	Aaron Gate	Burgos BH	Logan Currie	Lotto–Dstny
Nicaragua	Argenis Vanegas	Team Kilos	Argenis Vanegas	Team Kilos
North Macedonia	Dimitar Jovanoski	Novapor Speedbike Team	Darko Simonovski	Novapor Speedbike Team
Norway	Markus Hoelgaard	Uno-X Mobility	Søren Wærenskjold	Uno-X Mobility
Oman	Mohammed Al-Wahibi	Cycle KOM	Abdulrahman Alyaqoobi	Salalah Club
Panama	Franklin Archibold	Panamá es Cultura y Valores	Franklin Archibold	Panamá es Cultura y Valores
Paraguay	Fernando Andres Ferreira	Vivo–Conecta	Francisco Daniel Riveros	CC Armonia De Rocha
Peru	Bill Toscano	Sevenbikers Peru	Bill Toscano	Sevenbikers Peru
Philippines	Jonel Carcueva	Go for Gold Philippines	Nichol Pareja	Victoria Sports Pro Cycling Team
Poland	Norbert Banaszek	Mazowsze Serce Polski	Filip Maciejuk	Bora–Hansgrohe
Portugal	Rui Costa	EF Education–EasyPost	António Morgado	UAE Team Emirates
Puerto Rico	Elvys Reyes	SoCalCycling.com	Elvys Reyes	SoCalCycling.com
Romania	Cristian Raileanu	Li-Ning Star	Emil Dima	
Russia	Petr Rikunov	Chengdu Cycling Team	Petr Rikunov	Chengdu Cycling Team
Rwanda	Vaincaire Masengesho		Moise Mugisha	Java–Inovotec Pro Team
Saint Lucia	Eltus Joseph	ASC Karak	Stanislas Williams	
Saint Vincent and the Grenadines	Zefal Bailey		Zefal Bailey	
Serbia	Ognjen Ilić	Borac Cacak	Dušan Rajović	Team Bahrain Victorious
Singapore	Boon Kiak Yeo	RS Factor Race Team	Boon Kiak Yeo	RS Factor Race Team
Slovakia	Lukáš Kubiš	Elkov–Kasper	Lukáš Kubiš	Elkov–Kasper
Slovenia	Domen Novak	UAE Team Emirates	Matej Mohorič	Team Bahrain Victorious
South Africa	Ryan Gibbons	Lidl–Trek	Ryan Gibbons	Lidl–Trek
Spain	Alex Aranburu	Movistar Team	David de la Cruz	Q36.5 Pro Cycling Team
Suriname	Moses Rickets		Jair Nortan	
Sweden	Jacob Eriksson	Tudor Pro Cycling Team	Jakob Söderqvist	Lidl–Trek Future Racing
Switzerland	Mauro Schmid	Team Jayco–AlUla	Stefan Küng	Groupama–FDJ
Thailand	Thanakhan Chaiyasombat	Thailand Continental Cycling Team	Thanakhan Chaiyasombat	Thailand Continental Cycling Team
Trinidad and Tobago	Akil Campbell		Liam Trepte	
Turkey	Doğukan Arikan	Spor Toto Cycling Team	Ahmet Örken	Spor Toto Cycling Team
Uganda	Lawrence Lorot	Ride United		
Ukraine	Serhii Sydor	Ukraine Cycling Academy	Vitaliy Gryniv	
United Arab Emirates	Khalid Mayouf		Abdulla Al Hammadi	UAE Team Emirates Gen Z
United Kingdom	Ethan Hayter	INEOS Grenadiers	Joshua Tarling	INEOS Grenadiers
United States	Sean Quinn	EF Education–EasyPost	Brandon McNulty	UAE Team Emirates
Uruguay	Leonel Rodríguez	CC Cerro Largo	Agustín Alonso	CNP Bocas del Cufré
Uzbekistan	Dmitriy Bocharov	Tashkent City Professional Cycling Team	Nikita Tsvetkov	Tashkent City Professional Cycling Team
Venezuela	Anderson Timoteo Paredes		Orluis Aular	Caja Rural–Seguros RGA
Zimbabwe	Andrew Chikwaka		Andrew Chikwaka	

==== Champions in UCI Men's teams ====
UCI WorldTeams
Team	Road Race Champions	Time Trial Champions
Alpecin–Deceuninck		
Arkéa–B&B Hotels		
Astana Qazaqstan Team	Dmitriy Gruzdev (KAZ)	Dmitriy Gruzdev (KAZ)
Bora–Hansgrohe	Alexander Hajek (AUT)	Daniel Martínez (COL); Filip Maciejuk (POL)
Cofidis		
Decathlon–AG2R La Mondiale	Jaakko Hänninen (FIN); Paul Lapeira (FRA)	Bruno Armirail (FRA)
EF Education–EasyPost	Sean Quinn (USA); Darren Rafferty (IRL); Alberto Bettiol (ITA); Rui Costa (POR)	Richard Carapaz (ECU)
Groupama–FDJ	Kevin Geniets (LUX)	Stefan Küng (SUI)
INEOS Grenadiers	Jhonatan Narváez (ECU); Ethan Hayter (GBR)	Filippo Ganna (ITA); Joshua Tarling (GBR)
Intermarché–Wanty		Rein Taaramäe (EST)
Lidl–Trek	Natnael Tesfatsion (ERI); Ryan Gibbons (RSA)	Mathias Vacek (CZE); Mattias Skjelmose (DEN); Amanuel Ghebreigzabhier (ERI); Daan Hoole (NED); Ryan Gibbons (RSA)
Movistar Team	Alex Aranburu (ESP)	
Soudal–Quick-Step		
Team Bahrain Victorious		Dušan Rajović (SRB); Matej Mohorič (SLO)
Team dsm–firmenich PostNL	Emīls Liepiņš (LAT)	
Team Jayco–AlUla	Luke Plapp (AUS); Dylan Groenewegen (NED); Mauro Schmid (SUI)	Luke Plapp (AUS); Eddie Dunbar (IRL)
UAE Team Emirates	Domen Novak (SLO)	Felix Großschartner (AUT); Tim Wellens (BEL); Nils Politt (GER); António Morgado (POR); Brandon McNulty (USA)
Visma–Lease a Bike	Attila Valter (HUN)	

UCI ProTeams
Team	Road Race Champions	Time Trial Champions
Bingoal WB		
Burgos BH	Sergio Chumil (GUA); Aaron Gate (NZL)	Jambaljamts Sainbayar (MNG)
Caja Rural–Seguros RGA		Orluis Aular (VEN); Mulu Hailemichael (ETH)
Equipo Kern Pharma		
Euskaltel–Euskadi		
Israel–Premier Tech	Michael Woods (CAN); Oded Kogut (ISR)	Oded Kogut (ISR)
Lotto–Dstny	Arnaud De Lie (BEL)	Logan Currie (NZL)
Polti–Kometa		
Q36.5 Pro Cycling Team	Negasi Haylu Abreha (ETH)	David de la Cruz (ESP)
TDT–Unibet Cycling Team		
Team Corratec–Vini Fantini		
Team Flanders–Baloise		
Team Novo Nordisk		
Team TotalEnergies		
Tudor Pro Cycling Team	Marco Brenner (GER); Jacob Eriksson (SWE)	Arthur Kluckers (LUX)
Uno-X Mobility	Markus Hoelgaard (NOR)	Søren Wærenskjold (NOR)
VF Group–Bardiani–CSF–Faizanè		

=== Women's Elite ===
Country	Women's Elite Road Race Champion	Road Race Champion's Team	Women's Elite Time Trial Champion	Time Trial Champion's Team
Algeria	Yasmine El Meddah		Imene Maldji	
Argentina	Maria Fadiga		Carolina Vanesa Maldonado	
Australia	Ruby Roseman-Gannon	Liv AlUla Jayco	Grace Brown	FDJ–Suez
Austria	Anna Kiesenhofer	Roland	Anna Kiesenhofer	Roland
Bahrain	Fatema Murad		Fatema Murad	
Barbados	Amber Joseph		Amber Joseph	
Belgium	Lotte Kopecky	Team SD Worx–Protime	Lotte Kopecky	Team SD Worx–Protime
Belize	Kaya Cattouse	LA Sweat	Kaya Cattouse	LA Sweat
Benin	Hermione Ahouissou		Yetonde Kpovihouede	
Bermuda	Gabriella Arnold	LA Sweat Racing	Liana De Medeiros	
Bosnia and Herzegovina	Karla Kustura		Karla Kustura	
Brazil	Tamires Fanny Radatz		Ana Vitória Magalhães	Bepink–Bongioanni
Canada	Olivia Baril	Movistar Team	Paula Findlay	
Chile	Catalina Vidaurre Kossmann		Aranza Villalón	Soltec Iberoamérica
China	Zhang Hao	China Liv Pro Cycling	Sun Jia	
Colombia	Paula Patiño	Movistar Team	Diana Peñuela	DNA Pro Cycling
Croatia	Majda Horvat		Majda Horvat	
Cuba	Arlenis Sierra	Movistar Team	Arlenis Sierra	Movistar Team
Cyprus	Antri Christoforou	Roland	Antri Christoforou	Roland
Czech Republic	Barbora Němcová	Team Dukla Praha	Julia Kopecký	AG Insurance–NXTG U23 Team
Denmark	Rebecca Koerner	Uno-X Mobility	Emma Norsgaard	Movistar Team
Ecuador	Miryam Núñez	Primeau Vélo - Groupe Abadie	Miryam Núñez	Primeau Vélo - Groupe Abadie
Egypt	Ebtissam Zayed Ahmed		Ebtissam Zayed Ahmed	
El Salvador	Sauking Shi	Maca-Electrolit	Sauking Shi	Maca-Electrolit
Eritrea	Ksanet Weldemikael		Adiam Dawit	
Estonia	Laura Sander	AG Insurance–NXTG U23 Team	Laura Sander	AG Insurance–NXTG U23 Team
Finland	Anniina Ahtosalo	Uno-X Mobility	Anniina Ahtosalo	Uno-X Mobility
France	Juliette Labous	Team dsm–firmenich PostNL	Audrey Cordon-Ragot	Human Powered Health
Germany	Franziska Koch	Team dsm–firmenich PostNL	Mieke Kröger	
Greece	Argyro Milaki	St Kilda Cycling Club	Varvara Fasoi	
Guatemala	Gabriela Soto Lopez	Macizo Cordelsa	Gabriela Soto Lopez	Macizo Cordelsa
Hong Kong	Lee Sze Wing	HKSI Pro Cycling Team Women	Leung Wing Yee	HKSI Pro Cycling Team Women
Iceland	Hafdis Sigurðardóttir		Hafdis Sigurðardóttir	
India	Swasti Singh		Monika Jat	
Indonesia	Agustina Delia Priatna	Astana Dewi Women Team	Dewika Mulya Sova	
Iran	Somayeh Yazdani		Mandana Dehghan	
Ireland	Fiona Mangan	Cynisca Cycling	Fiona Mangan	Cynisca Cycling
Israel	Rotem Gafinovitz	Hess Cycling Team	Rotem Gafinovitz	Hess Cycling Team
Italy	Elisa Longo Borghini	Lidl–Trek	Vittoria Guazzini	FDJ–Suez
Hungary	Blanka Vas	Team SD Worx–Protime	Petra Zsanko	
Jamaica	Llori Sharpe		Llori Sharpe	
Japan	Eri Yonamine	Laboral Kutxa–Fundación Euskadi	Yui Ishida	
Kosovo	Nita Latifi		Dafina Zylfiu	
Latvia	Anastasia Carbonari	UAE Team ADQ	Kitija Siltumēna	Keukens Redant Cycling Team
Lithuania	Olivija Baleišytė		Olivija Baleišytė	
Luxembourg	Marie Schreiber	Team SD Worx–Protime	Christine Majerus	Team SD Worx–Protime
Malaysia	Nur Fitrah Shaari		Phi Kun Pan	
Mauritius	Kimberley Le Court	AG Insurance–Soudal	Kimberley Le Court	AG Insurance–Soudal
Montenegro	Ana Petrovic			
Morocco	Mallika Benallal		Mallika Benallal	
Namibia	Vera Looser		Vera Looser	
Netherlands	Chantal van den Broek-Blaak	Team SD Worx–Protime	Riejanne Markus	Visma–Lease a Bike
New Zealand	Ella Wyllie	Liv AlUla Jayco	Kim Cadzow	EF Education–Cannondale
Macau	Elena Petrova		Elena Petrova	
Norway	Mie Bjørndal Ottestad	Uno-X Mobility	Katrine Aalerud	Uno-X Mobility
Panama	Wendy Decreux	Maca–Electrolit	Wendy Decreux	Maca–Electrolit
Paraguay	Sonia Olmedo Ocampos		Araceli Galeano	
Philippines	Mathilda Krog		Jermyn Prado	
Poland	Dominika Włodarczyk	UAE Team ADQ	Marta Jaskulska	Ceratizit–WNT Pro Cycling
Portugal	Daniela Campos	Eneicat–CMTeam	Daniela Campos	Eneicat–CMTeam
Puerto Rico	Erialis Otero	Cantabria Deporte–Río Miera	Erialis Otero	Cantabria Deporte–Río Miera
Romania	Manuela Mureșan	Soltec Iberoamérica	Manuela Mureșan	Soltec Iberoamérica
Serbia	Jelena Erić	Movistar Team	Irina Stevanović	
Slovakia	Nora Jenčušová	Bepink–Bongioanni	Nora Jenčušová	Bepink–Bongioanni
Slovenia	Urška Žigart	Liv AlUla Jayco	Urška Žigart	Liv AlUla Jayco
South Africa	Carla Oberholzer		Hayley Preen	
Spain	Usoa Ostolaza	Laboral Kutxa–Fundación Euskadi	Mireia Benito	AG Insurance–Soudal
Sweden	Mika Söderström		Lisa Nordén	
Switzerland	Noemi Rüegg	EF Education–Cannondale	Elena Hartmann	Roland
Thailand	Phetdarin Somrat	Thailand Women's Cycling Team	Phetdarin Somrat	Thailand Women's Cycling Team
Trinidad and Tobago	Teniel Campbell	Liv AlUla Jayco	Teniel Campbell	Liv AlUla Jayco
Turkey	Sevim Gercek		Neriman Elden Kosker	
Ukraine	Olga Shekel		Yuliia Biriukova	Human Powered Health
United Arab Emirates	Safia Al Sayegh	UAE Team ADQ	Safia Al Sayegh	UAE Team ADQ
United Kingdom	Pfeiffer Georgi	Team dsm–firmenich PostNL	Anna Henderson	Visma–Lease a Bike
United States	Kristen Faulkner	EF Education–Cannondale	Taylor Knibb	
Uzbekistan	Yanina Kuskova	Tashkent City Women Professional Cycling Team	Margarita Misyurina	Tashkent City Women Professional Cycling Team
Zimbabwe	Skye Davidson		Skye Davidson	

==== Champions in UCI Women's teams ====
UCI Women's WorldTeams
Team	Road Race Champions	Time Trial Champions
AG Insurance–Soudal	Kimberley Le Court (MRI)	Kimberley Le Court (MRI); Mireia Benito (ESP)
Canyon//SRAM		
Ceratizit–WNT Pro Cycling		Marta Jaskulska (POL)
FDJ–Suez		Grace Brown (AUS)
Fenix–Deceuninck		
Human Powered Health		Audrey Cordon-Ragot (FRA); Yuliia Biriukova (UKR)
Lidl–Trek	Elisa Longo Borghini (ITA)	Vittoria Guazzini (ITA)
Liv AlUla Jayco	Ruby Roseman-Gannon (AUS); Ella Wyllie (NZL); Urška Žigart (SLO); Teniel Campbell (TTO)	Urška Žigart (SLO); Teniel Campbell (TTO)
Movistar Team	Olivia Baril (CAN); Paula Patiño (COL); Arlenis Sierra (CUB); Jelena Erić (SRB)	Arlenis Sierra (CUB); Emma Norsgaard (DEN)
Roland	Anna Kiesenhofer (AUT); Antri Christoforou (CYP)	Anna Kiesenhofer (AUT); Elena Hartmann (SUI); Antri Christoforou (CYP)
Team dsm–firmenich PostNL	Juliette Labous (FRA); Franziska Koch (GER); Pfeiffer Georgi (GBR)	
Team SD Worx–Protime	Lotte Kopecky (BEL); Marie Schreiber (LUX); Chantal van den Broek-Blaak (NED); Blanka Vas (HUN)	Lotte Kopecky (BEL); Christine Majerus (LUX)
Visma–Lease a Bike		Riejanne Markus (NED); Anna Henderson (GBR)
UAE Team ADQ	Anastasia Carbonari (LAT); Dominika Włodarczyk (POL); Safia Al Sayegh (UAE)	Safia Al Sayegh (UAE)
Uno-X Mobility	Rebecca Koerner (DEN); Anniina Ahtosalo (FIN); Mie Bjørndal Ottestad (NOR)	Anniina Ahtosalo (FIN); Katrine Aalerud (NOR)

UCI Women's Continental Teams
Team	Road Race Champions	Time Trial Champions
A.S.D. K2 Women Team		
AG Insurance–NXTG U23 Team	Laura Sander (EST)	Julia Kopecký (CZE); Laura Sander (EST)
Alba Development Road Team		
ARA Skip Capital		
Arkéa–B&B Hotels Women		
Aromitalia 3T Vaiano		
Astana Dewi Women Team	Agustina Delia Priatna (IDN)	
Bepink–Bongioanni	Nora Jenčušová (SVK)	Nora Jenčušová (SVK); Ana Vitória Magalhães (BRA)
Bodywrap LTwoo Women's Cycling Team		
Boneshaker Project presented by ROXO		
BTC City Ljubljana Zhiraf Ambedo		
Canyon–SRAM Generation		
Chevalmeire		
China Liv Pro Cycling	Zhang Hao (CHN)	
Cofidis		
Colombia Potencia de la Vida–Strongman Femenino		
Cycleversum Women Team		
Cynisca Cycling	Fiona Mangan (IRL)	Fiona Mangan (IRL)
DAS–Hutchinson–Brother–UK		
DNA Pro Cycling		Diana Peñuela (COL)
Doltcini O'Shea		
EF Education–Cannondale	Noemi Rüegg (SUI); Kristen Faulkner (USA)	Kim Cadzow (NZL)
Eneicat–CMTeam	Daniela Campos (POR)	Daniela Campos (POR)
Fenix–Deceuninck Development Team		
GT Krush Rebellease		
Hess Cycling Team	Rotem Gafinovitz (ISR)	Rotem Gafinovitz (ISR)
HKSI Pro Cycling Team	Lee Sze Wing (HKG)	Leung Wing Yee (HKG)
Isolmant–Premac–Vittoria		
Laboral Kutxa–Fundación Euskadi	Eri Yonamine (JPN); Usoa Ostolaza (ESP)	
Li Ning Star Ladies		
Lifeplus Wahoo		
Liv AlUla Jayco Women's Continental Team		
LKT Team		
Lotto–Dstny Ladies		
MAT Atom Deweloper Wrocław		
Maxx-Solar Rose Women Racing		
Primeau Vélo - Groupe Abadie	Miryam Núñez (ECU)	Miryam Núñez (ECU)
Pro-Noctis–200° Coffee–Hargreaves Contracting		
Proximus-Cyclis CT		
Soltec Iberoamérica	Manuela Mureșan (ROM)	Aranza Villalón (CHI); Manuela Mureșan (ROM)
St. Michel–Mavic–Auber93		
Standard Insurance PHI		
Tashkent City Women Professional Cycling Team	Yanina Kuskova (UZB)	Margarita Misyurina (UZB)
Team Bridgelane WE		
Team Coop–Repsol		
Team Dukla Praha	Barbora Němcová (CZE)	
Team Komugi–Grand Est		
Thailand Women's Cycling Team	Phetdarin Somrat (THA)	Phetdarin Somrat (THA)
Top Girls Fassa Bortolo		
Torelli		
UAE Development Team		
Virginia's Blue Ridge–Twenty24		
VolkerWessels Women Cyclingteam		
WCC Team		
Winspace		
