= 2025 women's road cycling championships =

The following is a list of championships in women's road cycling that occurred in 2025

== World Championships ==
Race	Date	Cat. †	Winner	Second	Third	Ref
(Rwanda) UCI Road World Championships ITT	21 September 2024	WC	(Switzerland) Marlen Reusser	(Netherlands) Anna van der Breggen	(Netherlands) Demi Vollering	
(Rwanda) UCI Road World Championships ITT U23	22 September 2024	WC	(United Kingdom) Zoe Bäckstedt	(Slovakia) Viktória Chladoňová	(Italy) Federica Venturelli	
(Rwanda) UCI Road World Championships ITT Junior	23 September 2023	WC	(Netherlands) Megan Arens	(Spain) Paula Ostiz	(Norway) Oda Aune Gissinger	
(Rwanda) UCI Road World Championships RR	27 September 2024	WC	(Canada) Magdeleine Vallieres	(New Zealand) Niamh Fisher-Black	(Spain) Mavi García	
(Rwanda) UCI Road World Championships RR U23	25 September 2024	WC	(France) Célia Gery	(Slovakia) Viktória Chladoňová	(Spain) Paula Blasi	
(Rwanda) UCI Road World Championships RR Junior	27 September 2024	WC	(Spain) Paula Ostiz	(Italy) Chantal Pegolo	(Switzerland) Anja Grossmann	
(Rwanda) UCI Road World Championships TTT	24 September 2024	WC	Australia (AUS); Michael Matthews; Luke Plapp; Jay Vine; Brodie Chapman; Amanda Spratt; Felicity Wilson-Haffenden	France (FRA); Bruno Armirail; Paul Seixas; Pavel Sivakov; Cédrine Kerbaol; Juliette Labous; Maëva Squiban	Switzerland (SUI); Jan Christen; Stefan Küng; Mauro Schmid; Jasmin Liechti; Marlen Reusser; Noemi Rüegg	

== National champions ==
=== Women's Elite ===
Country	Women's Elite Road Race Champion	Road Race Champion's Team	Women's Elite Time Trial Champion	Time Trial Champion's Team
Afghanistan	Fariba Hashimi	Ceratizit Pro Cycling	Fariba Hashimi	Ceratizit Pro Cycling
Algeria	Nesrine Houili		Nesrine Houili	
Argentina	Jennifer Francone		Fiorella Malaspina	
Australia	Lucinda Stewart	Liv AlUla Jayco	Brodie Chapman	UAE Team ADQ
Austria	Kathrin Schweinberger	Human Powered Health	Christina Schweinberger	Fenix–Deceuninck
Barbados	Danielle Hinds			
Belarus	Hanna Tserakh	Aromitalia 3T Vaiano	Hanna Tserakh	Aromitalia 3T Vaiano
Belgium	Justine Ghekiere	AG Insurance–Soudal	Lotte Kopecky	Team SD Worx–Protime
Belize	Nathalie Lovell		Patricia Chavarria	
Benin	Charlotte Metoevi		Hermionne Ahouissou	
Bermuda	Karen Bordage		Hanah Cannon	
Bolivia			Wanda Florencia Villanueva	Cantabria Deporte - Rio Miera
Burkina Faso	Awa Bamogo			
Brazil	Talita Oliveira		Tamires Radatz	
Canada			Olivia Baril	Movistar Team
Cayman Islands	Sarah Dick		Sarah Dick	
Chile	Catalina Soto	Laboral Kutxa–Fundación Euskadi	Catalina Soto	Laboral Kutxa–Fundación Euskadi
Colombia	Juliana Londoño	Team Picnic–PostNL	Diana Peñuela	Siscrédito-GW
Cuba	Marlies Mejías	Virginia's Blue Ridge–TWENTY24	Marlies Mejías	Virginia's Blue Ridge–TWENTY24
Czech Republic	Kristýna Burlová	Ceratizit Pro Cycling	Julia Kopecký	Team SD Worx–Protime
Denmark	Alberte Greve	Uno-X Mobility	Rebecca Koerner	Uno-X Mobility
Dominica	Rachel Semper			
Dominican Republic			Flor Espiritusanto	
Ecuador	Natalia Vasquez	Movistar - Best PC	Miryam Núñez	
Egypt	Ebtissam Mohamed	Dubai Police Cycling Team	Ebtissam Mohamed	Dubai Police Cycling Team
El Salvador			Sauking Shi	Team Santa Ana
Eritrea	Monalisa Araya			
Estonia	Elisabeth Ebras	BePink–Imatra–Bongioanni	Laura Lizette Sander	Team Coop–Repsol
Eswatini	Mandiswa Fakudze			
Ethiopia			Flor Espiritusanto	
Finland	Anniina Ahtosalo	Uno-X Mobility	Anniina Ahtosalo	Uno-X Mobility
France	Marie Le Net	FDJ–Suez	Cédrine Kerbaol	EF Education–Oatly
Germany	Franziska Koch	Team Picnic–PostNL	Antonia Niedermaier	Canyon//SRAM zondacrypto
Greece	Argiro Milaki	Aromitalia Vaiano		
Guatemala			Jasmin Soto	Liro Sport - Arraz Casanare
Guam	Allyssa Bernhardt		Audrey Manglona	
Guyana	Suzanne Taylor		Suzanne Taylor	
Hong Kong			Lee Sze Wing	HKSI Pro Cycling Team
Hungary	Blanka Vas	Team SD Worx–Protime	Petra Zsankó	Ceratizit Pro Cycling
India	Kaveri Muranal		Kaur Jasmmek Sekhon	
Indonesia			Ayustina Delia Priatna	
Ireland	Mia Griffin	Roland Le Dévoluy	Kelly Murphy	
Iceland			Hafdís Sigurðardóttir	
Italy	Elisa Longo Borghini	UAE Team ADQ	Vittoria Guazzini	FDJ–Suez
Jamaica		M	Llori Sharpe	
Japan	Akari Kobayashi	MtD - Women's Elite Cycling Team		
Kazakhstan	Yelizaveta Sklyarova	Born to Win BTC City Ljubljana Zhiraf	Akpeiil Ossim	Sahand Pump Crown Tabriz
Latvia	Dana Rožlapa	Keukens Redant Cycling Team	Dana Rožlapa	Keukens Redant Cycling Team
Lesotho			Tsepiso Lerata	
Lithuania	Daiva Ragažinskienė		Skaistė Mikašauskaitė	
Luxembourg	Marie Schreiber	Team SD Worx–Protime	Marie Schreiber	Team SD Worx–Protime
Malta	Diana Muscat	Team Greens	Michelle Vella Wood	Team Greens
Malaysia	Nurul Nabilah Mohd Asri	Nex Kedah Cycling Team	Ci Hui Nyo	
Mauritius	Kimberley Le Court	AG Insurance–Soudal	Kimberley Le Court	AG Insurance–Soudal
Namibia	Anri Krugel	Hollard Insurance	Anri Krugel	Hollard Insurance
Netherlands	Lorena Wiebes	Team SD Worx–Protime	Mischa Bredewold	Team SD Worx–Protime
New Zealand	Kim Cadzow	EF Education–Oatly	Kim Cadzow	EF Education–Oatly
Norway	Katrine Aalerud	Uno-X Mobility	Mie Bjørndal Ottestad	Uno-X Mobility
Pakistan	Rabia Garib		Rabia Garib	
Panama	Wendy Ducreux		Wendy Ducreux	
Paraguay	Araceli Jazmin Galeano		Araceli Jazmin Galeano	
Peru	Mariana Rojas		Romina Maribel Medrano	
Philippines	Kim Syrel Bonilla		Jermyn Prado	
Poland	Katarzyna Niewiadoma	Canyon//SRAM zondacrypto	Agnieszka Skalniak-Sójka	Canyon//SRAM zondacrypto
Portugal	Daniela Campos	Eneicat–CMTeam	Beatriz Roxo	Cantabria Deporte-Rio Miera
Puerto Rico	Erialis Otero			
Romania	Manuela Mureșan	E.C. Mataró Skoda-Mogadealer Women's Team	Manuela Mureșan	E.C. Mataró Skoda-Mogadealer Women's Team
Rwanda	Djazilla Umwamikazi		Xaverine Nirere	
Serbia	Jelena Erić	Movistar Team	Iva Pavlović	
Singapore			Faye Foo	
Sint Maarten	Susan Piscione		Susan Piscione	
Slovakia	Viktória Chladoňová	Visma–Lease a Bike	Visma–Lease a Bike	
Slovenia	Eugenia Bujak	Cofidis	Eugenia Bujak	Cofidis
South Africa	S'Annara Grove	CJ O'Shea Racing	Lucy Young	
South Korea	Jang Suji		Shin Jieung	
Spain	Sara Martín	Movistar Team	Mireia Benito	AG Insurance–Soudal
Sweden	Mika Söderström			
Switzerland	Steffi Häberlin	Team SD Worx–Protime	Marlen Reusser	Movistar Team
Taiwan	Huang Ting-ying		Huang Ting-ying	
Thailand	Phetdarin Somrat	Thailand Women's Cycling Team	Phetdarin Somrat	Thailand Women's Cycling Team
Trinidad and Tobago	Alexi Ramirez		Alexi Ramirez	
Turkey	Gamze Ceyhan		Reyhan Yakişir	
Uganda			Gamze Ceyhan	Black Mamba Development Squad
Ukraine	Yuliia Biriukova	Laboral Kutxa–Fundación Euskadi	Yuliia Biriukova	Laboral Kutxa–Fundación Euskadi
United Arab Emirates	Safia Al-Sayegh	UAE Team ADQ	Safia Al-Sayegh	UAE Team ADQ
United Kingdom	Millie Couzens	Fenix–Deceuninck	Zoe Bäckstedt	Canyon//SRAM zondacrypto
United States	Kristen Faulkner	EF Education–Oatly	Emily Ehrlich	Virginia's Blue Ridge–TWENTY24
Uruguay	Malvina Prieto		Anabel Posse	
Uzbekistan	Shakhnoza Abdullaeva	OU7 Women Cycling Team	Yanina Kuskova	Laboral Kutxa–Fundación Euskadi
Venezuela			Lilibeth Chacón	
Zimbabwe	Helen Mitchell		Helen Mitchell	

==== Champions in UCI women's teams ====
UCI Women's Teams
Team	Road Race Champions	Time Trial Champions
AG Insurance–Soudal	Justine Ghekiere (BEL); Kimberley Le Court (MRI)	Mireia Benito (ESP); Kimberley Le Court (MRI)
Canyon//SRAM zondacrypto	Katarzyna Niewiadoma (POL)	Zoe Bäckstedt (GBR); Antonia Niedermaier (GER); Agnieszka Skalniak-Sójka (POL)
Ceratizit Pro Cycling	Fariba Hashimi (AFG); Kristýna Burlová (CZE)	Fariba Hashimi (AFG); Petra Zsankó (HUN)
FDJ–Suez	Marie Le Net (FRA)	Vittoria Guazzini (ITA)
Fenix–Deceuninck	Millie Couzens (GBR)	Christina Schweinberger (AUT)
Human Powered Health	Kathrin Schweinberger (AUT)	
Lidl–Trek		
Liv AlUla Jayco	Lucinda Stewart (AUS)	
Movistar Team	Sara Martín (ESP); Jelena Erić (SRB)	Olivia Baril (CAN); Marlen Reusser (SUI)
Roland Le Dévoluy	Mia Griffin (IRL)	
Team Picnic–PostNL	Juliana Londoño (COL); Franziska Koch (GER)	
Team SD Worx–Protime	Blanka Vas (HUN); Marie Schreiber (LUX); Lorena Wiebes (NED); Steffi Häberlin (SUI)	Lotte Kopecky (BEL); Julia Kopecký (CZE); Marie Schreiber (LUX); Mischa Bredewold (NED)
Visma–Lease a Bike	Viktória Chladoňová (SVK)	Viktória Chladoňová (SVK)
UAE Team ADQ	Elisa Longo Borghini (ITA); Safia Al-Sayegh (UAE)	Brodie Chapman (AUS); Safia Al-Sayegh (UAE)
Uno-X Mobility	Alberte Greve (DEN); Anniina Ahtosalo (FIN); Mie Bjørndal Ottestad (NOR)	Rebecca Koerner (DEN); Anniina Ahtosalo (FIN); Katrine Aalerud (NOR)

UCI Women's ProTeams
Team	Road Race Champions	Time Trial Champions
Arkéa–B&B Hotels Women		
Cofidis	Eugenia Bujak (SLO)	Eugenia Bujak (SLO)
EF Education–Oatly	Kim Cadzow (NZL); Kristen Faulkner (USA)	Cédrine Kerbaol (FRA); Kim Cadzow (NZL)
Laboral Kutxa–Fundación Euskadi	Catalina Soto (CHI); Yuliia Biriukova (UKR)	Catalina Soto (CHI); Yuliia Biriukova (UKR); Yanina Kuskova (UZB)
St. Michel–Preference Home–Auber93		
VolkerWessels Women Cyclingteam		
Winspace Orange Seal		

UCI Women's Continental Teams
Team	Road Race Champions	Time Trial Champions
Aromitalia Vaiano	(Belarus) Hanna Tserakh (Greece) Argiro Milaki	(Belarus) Hanna Tserakh
BePink–Imatra–Bongioanni	(Estonia) Elisabeth Ebras	
Born to Win BTC City Ljubljana Zhiraf	(Kazakhstan) Yelizaveta Sklyarova	
Isolmant–Premac–Vittoria		
Team Mendelspeck E-Work		
Top Girls Fassa Bortolo		
AG Insurance–NXTG U23 Team		
Citymesh–Customm Pro Cycling Team		
Fenix–Premier Tech Development		
Lotto–Intermarché Ladies		
VELOPRO-Alphamotorhomes		
O'Shea Redchilli Bikes	(South Africa) S'Annara Grove	
DAS–Hutchinson		
Handsling Alba Development Road Team		
Hess Cycling Team		
Smurfit Westrock Cycling Team		
Bodywrap LTwoo Cycling Team		
China Liv Pro Cycling		
Li-Ning Star Ladies		
Cynisca Cycling		
Virginia's Blue Ridge–Twenty28	(Cuba) Marlies Mejías	(Cuba) Marlies Mejías
Canyon–SRAM Zondacrypto Generation		
LKT Team		
NEXETIS		
Standard Insurance PHI		
OU7 Cycling Team	(Uzbekistan) Shakhnoza Abdullaeva	
WCC Team		
HKSI Pro Cycling Team	(Hong Kong) Lee Sze Wing	(Hong Kong) Lee Sze Wing
Thailand Women's Cycling Team	(Thailand) Phetdarin Somrat	(Thailand) Phetdarin Somrat
Sidi Ali–Unlock Sports Team		
MAT Atom Deweloper Wrocław		
Dukla Women Cycling		
Team Drali–Repsol		Laura Lizette Sander
UAE Team ADQ Development		
Liv AlUla Jayco Continental		
Eneicat–CMTeam	(Portugal) Daniela Campos	

=== Women's U23 ===
Country	Women's U23 Road Race Champion	Road Race Champion's Team	Women's U23 Time Trial Champion	Time Trial Champion's Team
Argentina	Valentina Nahir Tapia		Delfina Dibella	
Australia	Lucinda Stewart	Liv AlUla Jayco	Alli Anderson	
Austria	Franziska Ehrenreich	Union Raiffeisen Radteam Tirol	Tabea Huys	Liv AlUla Jayco Continental
Belarus	Kseniya Shynkarenka	TOPVELO - ART Cycling Team	Polina Konrad	Minsk Cycling Club
Belgium			Luca Vierstraete	AG Insurance–NXTG U23 Team
Belize	Mya Bennett		Celina Baldera	
Benin			Charlotte Metoevi	
Brazil			Ana Catarina Furtado	
Chile			Martina Torres Salinas	
Colombia	Natalia Garzón	Siscrédito-GW	Natalia Garzón	Siscrédito-GW
Costa Rica	Dixiana Quesada		Sofia Quirós	
Cuba	Eyseli Rodríguez	Sancti Spiritus	Eyseli Urquiza	Sancti Spiritus
Cyprus			Eleni Koukouma	
Ecuador	Natalia Vásquez	Movistar - Best PC	Natalia Vásquez	Movistar - Best PC
Egypt				
Estonia				
Finland			Viivi Turpeinen	
France	Marion Bunel	Visma–Lease a Bike	Amandine Muller	AG Insurance–NXTG U23 Team
Germany	Linda Riedmann	Visma–Lease a Bike	Justyna Czapla	Canyon//SRAM zondacrypto
Greece	Eleftheria Giachou		Eleftheria Giachou	
Guatemala			Jessica Nicho	
Hong Kong				
India				
Japan	Homare Yamashita			
Kyrgyzstan	Alla Voronaia		Alla Voronaia	
Lesotho				
Lithuania			Gabija Jonaitytė	
Luxembourg	Marie Schreiber	Team SD Worx–Protime	Liv Wenzel	
Malaysia				
Mauritius				
Namibia			Monique du Plessis	
New Zealand			Kirsty Watts	
Pakistan				
Panama			Maraya López	
Paraguay				
Peru				
Philippines			Kim Syrel Bonilla	
Romania				
Serbia	Marija Pavlović		Marija Pavlović	
Singapore				
South Africa			Sonica Klopper	
Switzerland	Anina Hutter	NEXETIS	Lorena Leu	Carbonbike Giordana by Gen Z
Taiwan				
Thailand	Natcha Songkhen		Pittayapron Seatun	
Trinidad and Tobago			Ashleigh Thomas	
United Arab Emirates				
United States	Ella Sabo	Virginia's Blue Ridge–Twenty28	Chloe Patrick	Cynisca Cycling
Uruguay			Florencia Revetria	
Uzbekistan	Mohinabonu Elmurodova	OU7 Cycling Team	Asal Rizaeva	OU7 Cycling Team
Zimbabwe				

==== Champions in UCI women's teams ====
UCI Women's Teams
Team	Road Race Champions	Time Trial Champions
AG Insurance–Soudal		
Canyon//SRAM zondacrypto		(Germany) Justyna Czapla
Ceratizit Pro Cycling		
FDJ–Suez		
Fenix–Deceuninck		
Human Powered Health		
Lidl–Trek		
Liv AlUla Jayco	Lucinda Stewart (AUS)	
Movistar Team		
Roland Le Dévoluy		
Team Picnic–PostNL		
Team SD Worx–Protime	(Luxembourg) Marie Schreiber	
Visma–Lease a Bike	(France) Marion Bunel (Germany) Linda Riedmann	
UAE Team ADQ		
Uno-X Mobility		

UCI Women's ProTeams
Team	Road Race Champions	Time Trial Champions
Arkéa–B&B Hotels Women		
Cofidis		
EF Education–Oatly		
Laboral Kutxa–Fundación Euskadi		
St. Michel–Preference Home–Auber93		
VolkerWessels Women Cyclingteam		
Winspace Orange Seal		

UCI Women's Continental Teams
Team	Road Race Champions	Time Trial Champions
Aromitalia Vaiano		
Vini Fantini–BePink		
Born to Win BTC City Ljubljana Zhiraf		
Isolmant–Premac–Vittoria		
Team Mendelspeck E-Work		
Top Girls Fassa Bortolo		
AG Insurance–NXTG U23 Team	(France) Amandine Muller	(Belgium) Luca Vierstraete
Citymesh–Customm Pro Cycling Team		
Fenix–Premier Tech Development		
Lotto–Intermarché Ladies		
VELOPRO-Alphamotorhomes		
O'Shea Redchilli Bikes		
DAS–Hutchinson		
Handsling Alba Development Road Team		
Hess Cycling Team		(Luxembourg) Liv Wenzel
Smurfit Westrock Cycling Team		
Bodywrap LTwoo Cycling Team		
China Liv Pro Cycling		
Li-Ning Star Ladies		
Cynisca Cycling		(United States) Chloe Patrick
Virginia's Blue Ridge–Twenty28	(United States) Ella Sabo	
Canyon–SRAM Zondacrypto Generation		
LKT Team		
NEXETIS	(Switzerland) Anina Hutter	
Standard Insurance PHI		
OU7 Cycling Team	(Uzbekistan) Mohinabonu Elmurodova	(Uzbekistan) Asal Rizaeva
WCC Team		
HKSI Pro Cycling Team		
Thailand Women's Cycling Team		
Sidi Ali–Unlock Sports Team		
MAT Atom Deweloper Wrocław		
Dukla Women Cycling		
Team Drali–Repsol		
UAE Team ADQ Development		
Liv AlUla Jayco Continental		(Austria) Tabea Huys
Eneicat–CMTeam		

=== Women's Juniors ===
Country	Women's Junior Road Race Champion	Road Race Champion's Team	Women's Junior Time Trial Champion	Time Trial Champion's Team
Albania	Nikol Dollaku		Nikol Dollaku	
Argentina				
Australia	Anna Dubier	ARA Skip Capital	Amelie Sanders	ARA Skip Capital
Belarus	Krystsina Yahlinskaya		Krystsina Yahlinskaya	
Belgium	Auke De Buysser		Laura Fivé	
Belize	Chelsy Gillett		Irene Baki	
Benin	Georgette Vignonfodo		Georgette Vignonfodo	
Bermuda	Charlotte Millington		Charlotte Millington	
Bolivia	Anahí Stephany Diaz		Brania Orquera	
Brazil				
Bulgaria	Ivet Dimitrova Ivanova		Jessika Chan	
Burkina Faso	Elvine Marie Rose Yameogo			
Chile	Marlen Rojas		Florencia Monsálvez	
Colombia				
Costa Rica	Yailin Gómez		Miah Vargas	
Cuba				
Czech Republic	Karolina Špicarová	VIF Cycling Development Team	Karolina Špicarová	VIF Cycling Development Team
Denmark			Ida Dam Fialla	
Ecuador	Alison Adriana Fuertes		Dámaris Torres	
Egypt				
Estonia			Lauren Pohl	
Finland	Anni Teronen		Lotte Borremans	
France	Thaïs Poirier		Thaïs Poirier	
Greece	Eirini Papadimitriou		Eirini Papadimitriou	
Guatemala			Hannia Jazmín Puac	
Hong Kong				
Hungary			Málna Mudra	
India				
Iran				
Italy			Matilde Rossignoli	
Japan	Yuka Nishihara			
Kosovo				
Kyrgyzstan	Angelina Blindul		Angelina Blindul	
Lesotho	Pontso Makatile		Pontso Makatile	
Lithuania			Augustė Audinytė	
Malaysia	Nur Aierin Wadhiah Mohd Adni		Davia Evriel Eriana Azif	
Mauritius				
Namibia	Rosemarie Thiel		Delsia Janse van Vuuren	
Netherlands	Britt Jeucken		Megan Arens	
New Zealand	Neve McKenzie		Neve McKenzie	
Pakistan	Carol Patras		Suhaira Durrani	
Panama	Noemí Atencio		Noemí Atencio	
Paraguay	Cecilia Fernández		Cecilia Fernández	
Peru				
Philippines	Jazmine Kaye Vinoya		Mary Gwennielle Francisco	
Puerto Rico	Daliana Colón			
Romania	Iana Alesia Balteș		Iana Alesia Balteș	
Serbia	Marija Bajeva		Marija Bajeva	
Singapore				
Slovakia	Nina Andacká	SanaClis SLAVKO	Nina Andacká	SanaClis SLAVKO
South Africa	Errin Mackridge		Carli Bouwer	
Taiwan				
Thailand	Pummarat Chaloemkij		Suphannika Chantorn	
Trinidad and Tobago			Cassidy Samaroo	
Tunisia				
United Arab Emirates				
United States	Alyssa Sarkisov		Liliana Edwards	
Uruguay	Xiomara Belén Morales		Xiomara Belén Morales	
Uzbekistan	Samira Ismailova		Nozima Engamberdieva	
Zimbabwe	Michelle Pious		Michelle Pious	

==== Champions in UCI women's teams ====
UCI Women's Teams
Team	Road Race Champions	Time Trial Champions
AG Insurance–Soudal		
Canyon//SRAM zondacrypto		
Ceratizit Pro Cycling		
FDJ–Suez		
Fenix–Deceuninck		
Human Powered Health		
Lidl–Trek		
Liv AlUla Jayco		
Movistar Team		
Roland Le Dévoluy		
Team Picnic–PostNL		
Team SD Worx–Protime		
Visma–Lease a Bike		
UAE Team ADQ		
Uno-X Mobility		

UCI Women's ProTeams
Team	Road Race Champions	Time Trial Champions
Arkéa–B&B Hotels Women		
Cofidis		
EF Education–Oatly		
Laboral Kutxa–Fundación Euskadi		
St. Michel–Preference Home–Auber93		
VolkerWessels Women Cyclingteam		
Winspace Orange Seal		

UCI Women's Continental Teams
Team	Road Race Champions	Time Trial Champions
Aromitalia Vaiano		
Vini Fantini–BePink		
Born to Win BTC City Ljubljana Zhiraf		
Isolmant–Premac–Vittoria		
Team Mendelspeck E-Work		
Top Girls Fassa Bortolo		
AG Insurance–NXTG U23 Team		
Citymesh–Customm Pro Cycling Team		
Fenix–Premier Tech Development		
Lotto–Intermarché Ladies		
VELOPRO-Alphamotorhomes		
O'Shea Redchilli Bikes		
DAS–Hutchinson		
Handsling Alba Development Road Team		
Hess Cycling Team		
Smurfit Westrock Cycling Team		
Bodywrap LTwoo Cycling Team		
China Liv Pro Cycling		
Li-Ning Star Ladies		
Cynisca Cycling		
Virginia's Blue Ridge–Twenty28		
Canyon–SRAM Zondacrypto Generation		
LKT Team		
NEXETIS		
Standard Insurance PHI		
OU7 Cycling Team		
WCC Team		
HKSI Pro Cycling Team		
Thailand Women's Cycling Team		
Sidi Ali–Unlock Sports Team		
MAT Atom Deweloper Wrocław		
Dukla Women Cycling		
Team Drali–Repsol		
UAE Team ADQ Development		
Liv AlUla Jayco Continental		
Eneicat–CMTeam		

== Continental championships ==
Championships	Race	Winner	Second	Third
Asian Cycling Championships; Thailand 7–16 February 2025 (2025 summary)	Road race	Jutatip Maneephan (THA)	Nguyễn Thị Thật (VIE)	Lee Sze Wing (HKG)
Asian Cycling Championships; Thailand 7–16 February 2025 (2025 summary)	Individual time trial	Yanina Kuskova (UZB)	Safia Al-Sayegh (UAE)	Tsuyaka Uchino (JPN)
Asian Cycling Championships; Thailand 7–16 February 2025 (2025 summary)	Individual time trial (U23)	Qing Zhao (CHN)	Maho Kakita (JPN)	Asal Rizaeva (UZB)
Asian Cycling Championships; Thailand 7–16 February 2025 (2025 summary)	Road race (Junior)	Angelina Burenkova (KAZ)	Chih Yi Chu (TPE)	Syahla Syafiah (INA)
Asian Cycling Championships; Thailand 7–16 February 2025 (2025 summary)	Individual time trial (Junior)	Samira Ismailova (UZB)	Mariya Yelkina (KAZ)	Harshita Jakhar (IND)
Asian Cycling Championships; Thailand 7–16 February 2025 (2025 summary)	Team Mixed Relay	Kazakhstan (KAZ); Dmitriy Gruzdev; Anton Kuzmin; Anzhela Solovyeva; Rinata Sultanova; Makhabbat Umutzhanova; Yevgeniy Fedorov	Japan (JPN); Yukiya Arashiro; Yūma Koishi; Koki Kamada; Tsuyaka Uchino; Mizuki Ikeda; Maho Kakita	Hong Kong (HKG); Leung Wing-yee; Yang Qianyu; Lee Sze Wing; Ng Pak-hang; Mow Ching Yin; Vincent Lau Wan Yau
Asian Cycling Championships; Thailand 7–16 February 2025 (2025 summary)	Team Mixed Relay	Uzbekistan (UZB); Mukhriddin Safarov; Artur Streltsov; Samira Ismailova; Yana Mishinova; Roksana Xikmatova; Vitaliy Burlakov	Kazakhstan (KAZ); Anna Proskurina; Mariya Yelkina; Angelina Burenkova; Almir Valiev; Murat Kuitenov; Kirill Chzhan	Thailand (THA); Thanapat Sakuntae; Watcharaphong Sangkong; Peerawat Withidpanitphan; Suphannika Chantorn; Taniyaporn Singtong; Kawisara Umkamnerd
Elite Road Central American Championships; Guatemala 11–13 April 2025 (2025 summary)	Road race (U23)	Dixiana Quesada (CRC)	Diandra Ramírez (CRC)	Marisol Garcia (CRC)
Elite Road Central American Championships; Guatemala 11–13 April 2025 (2025 summary)	Individual time trial (U23)	Sofía Quirós (CRC)	Diandra Ramírez (CRC)	Hannea Puac (GUA)
Elite Road Central American Championships; Guatemala 11–13 April 2025 (2025 summary)	Road race (Junior)	Yailin Gómez (CRC)	Ana Sofía Robles (GUA)	Noemí Atencio (PAN)
Elite Road Central American Championships; Guatemala 11–13 April 2025 (2025 summary)	Individual time trial (Junior)	Yailin Gómez (CRC)	Ana Sofía Robles (GUA)	Alison Rodas (GUA)
Pan American Road Championships; Uruguay 23–27 April 2025 (2025 summary)	Road race	Juliana Londoño (COL)	Skylar Schneider (USA)	Teniel Campbell (TTO)
Pan American Road Championships; Uruguay 23–27 April 2025 (2025 summary)	Individual time trial	Ruth Winder (USA)	Emily Ehrlich (USA)	Teniel Campbell (TTO)
Pan American Road Championships; Uruguay 23–27 April 2025 (2025 summary)	Road race (Junior)	Luciana Osorio (COL)	Valentina Marín (COL)	Guadalupe Díaz (ARG)
Pan American Road Championships; Uruguay 23–27 April 2025 (2025 summary)	Individual time trial (Junior)	Luciana Osorio (COL)	Estefanía Castillo (COL)	Marlén Rojas (CHI)
European Road Cycling Championships; France 1–5 October 2025 (2025 summary)	Road race	Demi Vollering (NED)	Katarzyna Niewiadoma (POL)	Anna van der Breggen (NED)
European Road Cycling Championships; France 1–5 October 2025 (2025 summary)	Individual time trial	Marlen Reusser (SUI)	Mie Bjørndal Ottestad (NOR)	Mischa Bredewold (NED)
European Road Cycling Championships; France 1–5 October 2025 (2025 summary)	Road race (U23)	Paula Blasi (ESP)	Eleonora Ciabocco (ITA)	Julie Bego (FRA)
European Road Cycling Championships; France 1–5 October 2025 (2025 summary)	Individual time trial (U23)	Federica Venturelli (ITA)	Anniina Ahtosalo (FIN)	Luca Vierstraete (BEL)
European Road Cycling Championships; France 1–5 October 2025 (2025 summary)	Road race (Junior)	Paula Ostiz (ESP)	Anja Grossmann (SUI)	Chantal Pegolo (ITA)
European Road Cycling Championships; France 1–5 October 2025 (2025 summary)	Individual time trial (Junior)	Paula Ostiz (ESP)	Magdalena Leis (GER)	Oda Aune Gissinger (NOR)
European Road Cycling Championships; France 1–5 October 2025 (2025 summary)	Team Mixed Relay	France (FRA); Rémi Cavagna; Thibault Guernalec; Marion Borras; Cédrine Kerbaol; Bruno Armirail; Juliette Labous	Italy (ITA); Lorenzo Milesi; Filippo Ganna; Marco Frigo; Elena Cecchini; Vittoria Guazzini; Federica Venturelli	Switzerland (SUI); Noemi Rüegg; Jasmin Liechti; Mauro Schmid; Jan Christen; Stefan Küng; Marlen Reusser
European Road Cycling Championships; France 1–5 October 2025 (2025 summary)	Junior Team Mixed Relay	Norway (NOR); Sindre Orholm-Lønseth; Kristian Haugetun; Håkon Eiksund Øksnes; Oda Aune Gissinger; Marte Dolven; Ida Østbye Støvern	France (FRA); Zoé Bihan; Luc Royer; Gabin Gicquel; Lancelot Gayant; Ninon Humbert; Charlotte Bouhier	Poland (POL); Nadia Hartman; Kinga Słomka; Anna Gaborska; Ksawery Gancarz; Marcin Włodarski; Mikołaj Legieć

== Others ==
Championships	Race	Winner	Second	Third
Games of the Small States of Europe; Andorra 27–31 May 2025 (2025 summary)	Road race	Marie Schreiber; Luxembourg; Nina Berton; Luxembourg	shared gold	Valentina Venerucci; San Marino
Games of the Small States of Europe; Andorra 27–31 May 2025 (2025 summary)	Individual time trial	Marie Schreiber; Luxembourg	Nina Berton; Luxembourg	Hafdís Sigurðardóttir; Iceland
Games of the Small States of Europe; Andorra 27–31 May 2025 (2025 summary)	Team Relay	Luxembourg; Liv Wenzel; Layla Barthels; Maïté Barthels; Nina Berton; Marie Schreiber	Cyprus; Styliana Camelari; Constantina Georgiou; Ekaterina Kovalchuk; Demetra Koukouma; Eleni Koukouma; Alexandra Safiri	Andorra; Anna Albalat; Raquel Balboa; Laia Sebastià
Junior Pan American Games; Paraguay 10–22 August 2025 (2025 summary)	Road race	Julieta Benedetti; Argentina	Natalie Revelo; Ecuador	Natalia Garzón; Colombia
Junior Pan American Games; Paraguay 10–22 August 2025 (2025 summary)	Individual time trial	Natalia Garzón; Colombia	Julieta Benedetti; Argentina	Delfina Debilla; Argentina
