= Fiona Mangan =

Irish professional cyclist (born 1996)

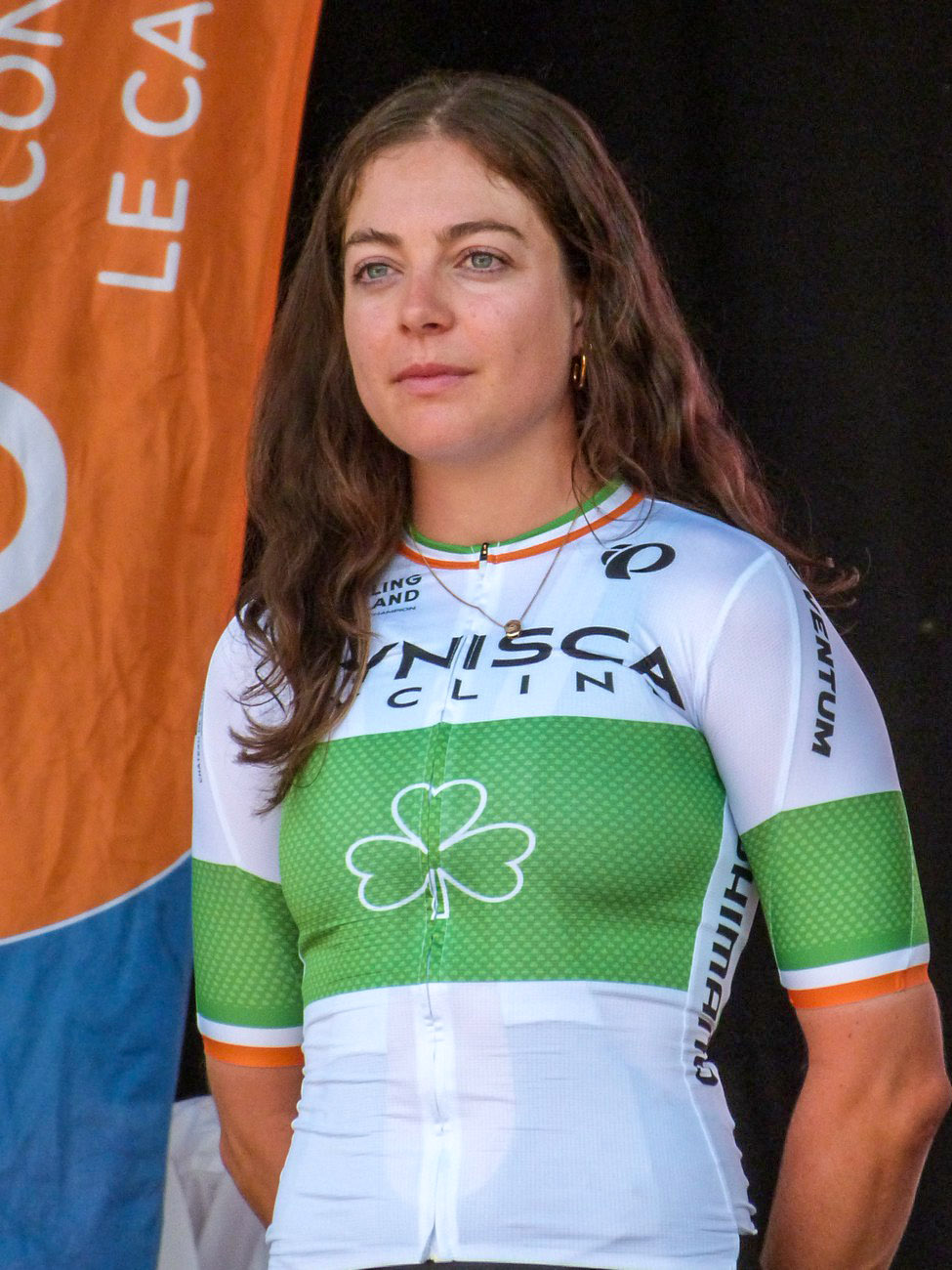
- Mangan during the presentation of the TCFIA 2024 teams, in Saint-Alban-Auriolles, France.

Personal information
- Born: 16 May 1996 (age 30) County Limerick, Ireland

Cycling career
- Sport: Cycling
- Current team: Mayenne Monbana My Pie
- Discipline: Road
- Role: Rider

Amateur team
- 2021: Costa Brava Mediterranean Foods–Top Conserge

Professional teams
- 2022: IBCT
- 2023: Soltec Team
- 2023–2024: Cynisca Cycling
- 2025–: Winspace Orange Seal

Major wins
- One-day races National Road Race Championships (2024) National Time Trial Championships (2024)

Fiona Mangan (born 16 May 1996) is an Irish professional road cyclist, from County Limerick. She has held multiple national titles. She has competed for teams such as Soltec Team, Cynisca Cycling and Winspace Orange Seal.

== Background ==
Mangan is a qualified biomedical engineer, having been published for the University of Galway. She played gaelic football before specialising in cycling.

== Cycling career ==
In 2021, Mangan won the Irish National Road Series representing Costa Brava Mediterranean Foods-Top Conserge. In 2023, became the first Irish woman to finish a Grand Tour, finishing in 99th position in the La Vuelta for Soltec Team. Racing for Cynisca Cycling, she claimed both the time trial and road race national titles in 2024, having won bronze in the road race in 2022.

Mangan finished in 70th position at the 2023 European Road Championships road race, and 65th at the 2024 UCI Road World Championships road race.

She joined Winspace Orange Seal in 2025. She needed a double-surgery after a crash in early 2025.

In July 2025, Mangan achieved her first international stage win at the Volta a Portugal.

== Major results ==
2022
3rd Road race, National Road Championships
2023
10th Egmont Cycling Race
2024
National Road Championships

1st Road race
1st Time trial

8th Clásica de Almería
10th GP Lucien Van Impe
