= Georgie Howe =

Australian rower & cyclist

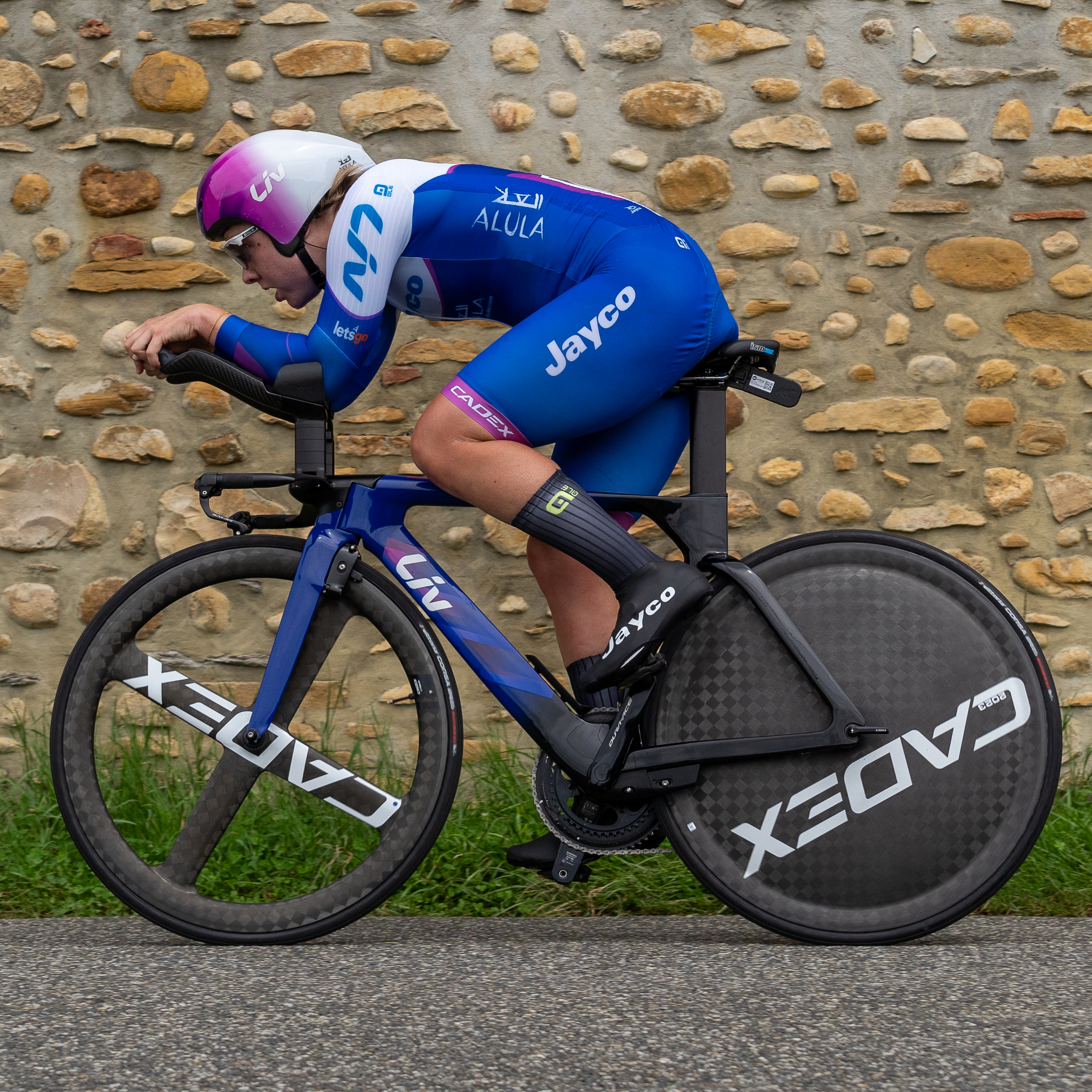
- Howe in 2023

Personal information
- Full name: Georgina Howe
- Born: 3 March 1994 (age 32) Melbourne, Australia
- Education: Melbourne Girls Grammar School; Princeton University
- Height: 1.76 m (5 ft 9 in)
- Cycling career
- Sport: Cycling
- Discipline: Road
- Role: Rider
- Rider type: Time trialist

Professional team
- 2023–2024: Liv AlUla Jayco

Sport
- Sport: Rowing, road cycling
- Club: Melbourne University Boat Club

Achievements and titles
- National finals: Queen's Cup 2019
Medal record
Women's rowing
Representing Australia

Georgina "Georgie" Howe (born 3 March 1994) is an Australian former national representative rower and professional cyclist who last rode for UCI Women's WorldTeam Liv AlUla Jayco.

== School, varsity and state rowing ==
Howe was educated at Melbourne Girls' Grammar School where she took up rowing. In the Melbourne Girl's Grammar senior eight she won the national schoolgirls eight titles at Australian Rowing Championships in 2011 and 2012.

Her senior club rowing in Australia was from the Melbourne University Boat Club. In MUBC colours she achieved three podium finishes in U21 sweep oared boats at the 2013 Australian Championships including a national title win in the women's coxless four. After graduation from Princeton she was back at the Australian championships in MUBC boats in 2018 and 2019. She achieved podium finishes in the coxless four in 2018 and in the coxless four and eight in 2019.

She attended Princeton University on a rowing scholarship and participated in their elite program. She rowed in the senior varsity VIII in all four of her Princeton years 2014 to 2017, won three Ivy-League titles in that time and in her senior year was the rowing team co-captain and a first team All-Ivy League honoree.

Howe was first selected to represent Victoria in the women's youth eight which contested the Bicentennial Cup in the Interstate Regatta at the 2013 Australian Rowing Championships. In 2019 Howe was selected in the Victorian the senior women's eight which contested and won the Queen's Cup at the Australian Interstate Regatta.

== International representative rowing ==
Howe made her Australian representative debut in 2014 into the U23 Australian eight which placed fourth at the U23 World Championships in Varese that year. In 2015 she rowed with in the coxless four to another fourth place at the U23 World Rowing Championships in Plovdiv. In that same year 2015 she was selected in the Australian women's senior eight to contest the 2015 World Rowing Championships in Aiguebelette. This was an Olympic qualification regatta and the Australian eight were disappointed with an overall 8th-placed finish. Although Australia did manage to qualify the women's eight at the final Olympic qualification event only the coxswain and four of the crew who'd raced at the 2015 World Championships, made that Olympic boat. By that stage Georgie Howe was out of the Australian senior squad.

== Professional cycling career ==
Howe describes herself as becoming "burnt out" by rowing. During the rigid Covid lockdowns in Melbourne of 2020 and 2021 her training regime moved to a Kickr bike, indoors and she approached it with vigour. She describes herself as "one of the COVID cyclists". In 2022 she competed at the Australian National Road Cycling Championships, the Tour Down Under and then won the 2022 Oceania Time Trial Championships.

In Europe Howe initially joined a Belgian UCI team. In 2023, racing for Liv AlUla Jayco, she participated in the 2023 La Vuelta Femenina and the 2023 Tour de France Femmes in which she finished 96th.

== Major cycling results ==
2022
Oceania Road Championships

1st Time trial
5th Road race

4th Time trial, National Road Championships
4th Overall Baloise Ladies Tour
2023
2nd Time trial, National Road Championships
8th Schwalbe Classic
10th UCI Road World Championships – Women's time trial
