= Émilie Fortin =

Canadian cyclist

Personal information
- Born: 21 May 1999 (age 27)

Cycling career
- Sport: Cycling
- Current team: Cynisca Cycling
- Discipline: Road
- Role: Rider

Amateur team
- 2018–2019: Espoirs Elite–Primeau Vélo

Professional teams
- 2020: Macogep Tornatech Girondins de Bordeaux
- 2020–2021: Bizkaia–Durango
- 2023–: Cynisca Cycling

Émilie Fortin (born 21 May 1999) is a Canadian professional racing cyclist, who currently rides for UCI Women's Continental Team Cynisca Cycling.

== Major results ==
2019
10th Clásica CRC 506
2023
1st Clásica de Almería
3rd Overall Joe Martin Stage Race
6th Gran Premio Ciudad de Eibar
