= Ariana Gilabert =

Spanish cyclist (born 2000)

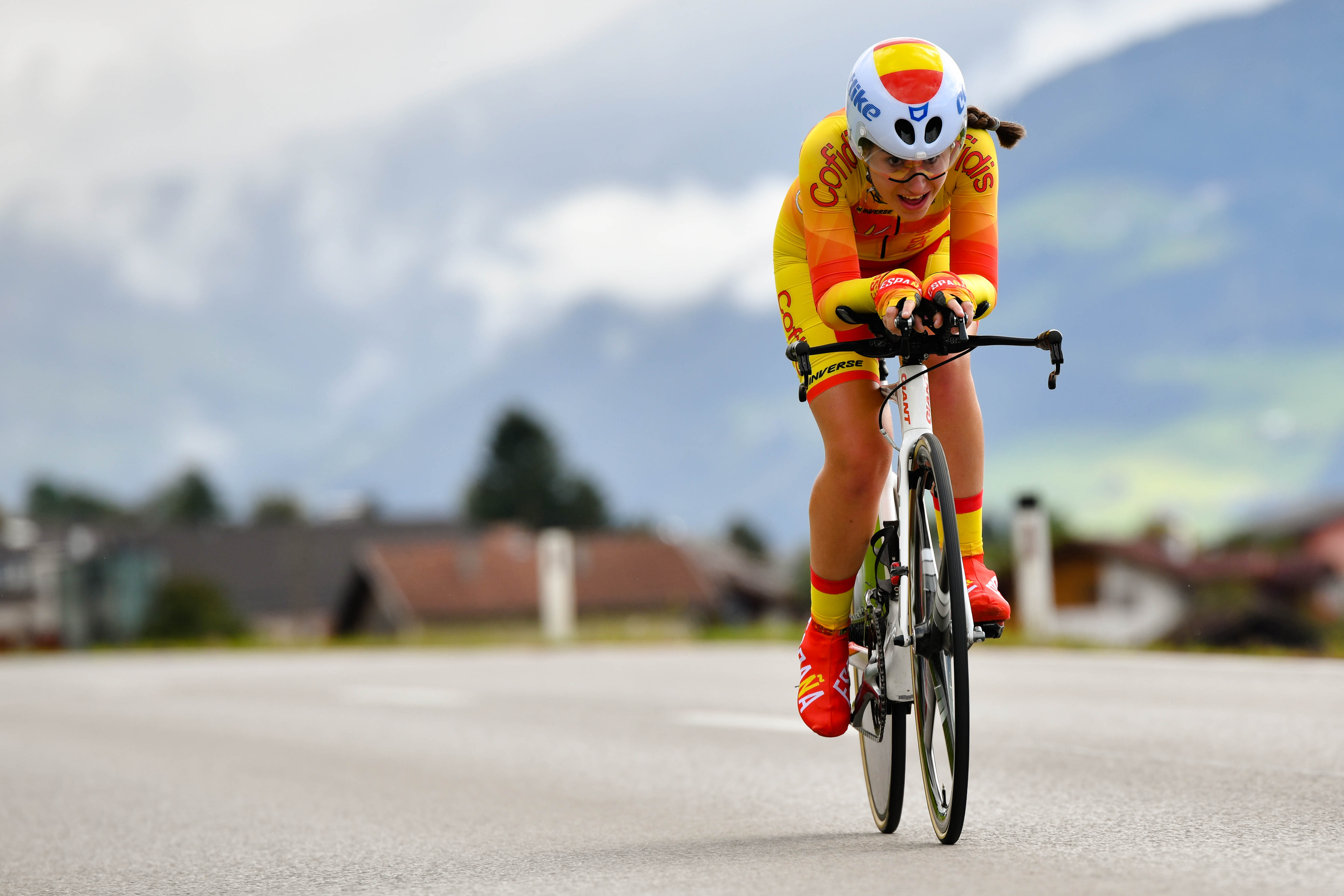

Personal information
- Full name: Ariana Gilabert Vilaplana
- Born: 12 April 2000 (age 26)

Cycling career
- Sport: Cycling
- Current team: Eneicat–CMTeam
- Discipline: Road
- Role: Rider

Professional teams
- 2019–2021: Bizkaia–Durango
- 2022–2023: Laboral Kutxa–Fundación Euskadi
- 2024–: Eneicat–CMTeam

Ariana Gilabert Vilaplana (born 12 April 2000) is a Spanish professional racing cyclist, who currently rides for UCI Women's Continental Team Bizkaia–Durango.
