= Mari Hole Mohr =

Norwegian cyclist

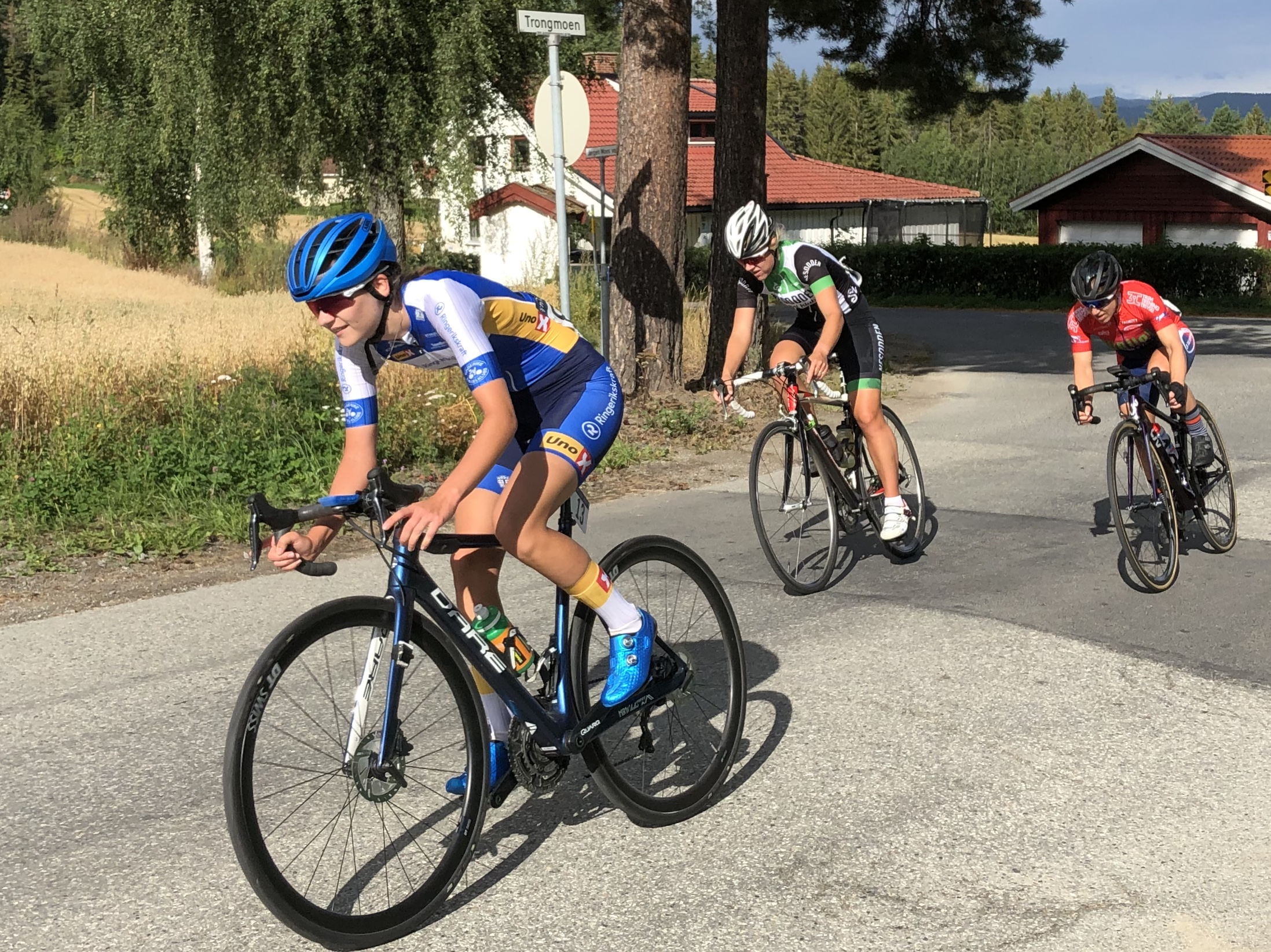

Personal information
- Born: 1 March 2001 (age 24); Sandnes, Norway

Mari Hole Mohr (born 1 March 2001) is a Norwegian professional racing cyclist from Sandnes, who currently rides for Stavanger SK and Team Coop–Repsol.

Mohr won the Norwegian Cup in junior women's road cycling in 2019.

Mohr's best placement in the NM senior was third place at the NM i landeveissykling 2022. In the NM i landeveissykling 2024 she placed 10th in the street race.

During the NM i landeveissykling 2020, she came in 22nd place in the mass start.
