= Soltec Team =

Spanish cycling team

Team information
- UCI code: STC (2022–)
- Registered: Spain
- Founded: 2022
- Discipline: Road
- Status: UCI Women's Continental Team (2022–)

Team name history
- 2022–: Soltec Team

Soltec Team is a Spanish women's road cycling team that was founded in 2022.

== Major results ==
2022
Trofeo Entre Viñas–Tomelloso, Almudena Montalvo

== National Champions ==
2023
Ethiopia Time Trial, Teklehaimanot Tsesfay
Romania Time Trial, Manuela Muresan
Ethiopia Road Race, Teklehaimanot Tsesfay
