= Daniela Campos =

Portugal road cyclist (born 2002)

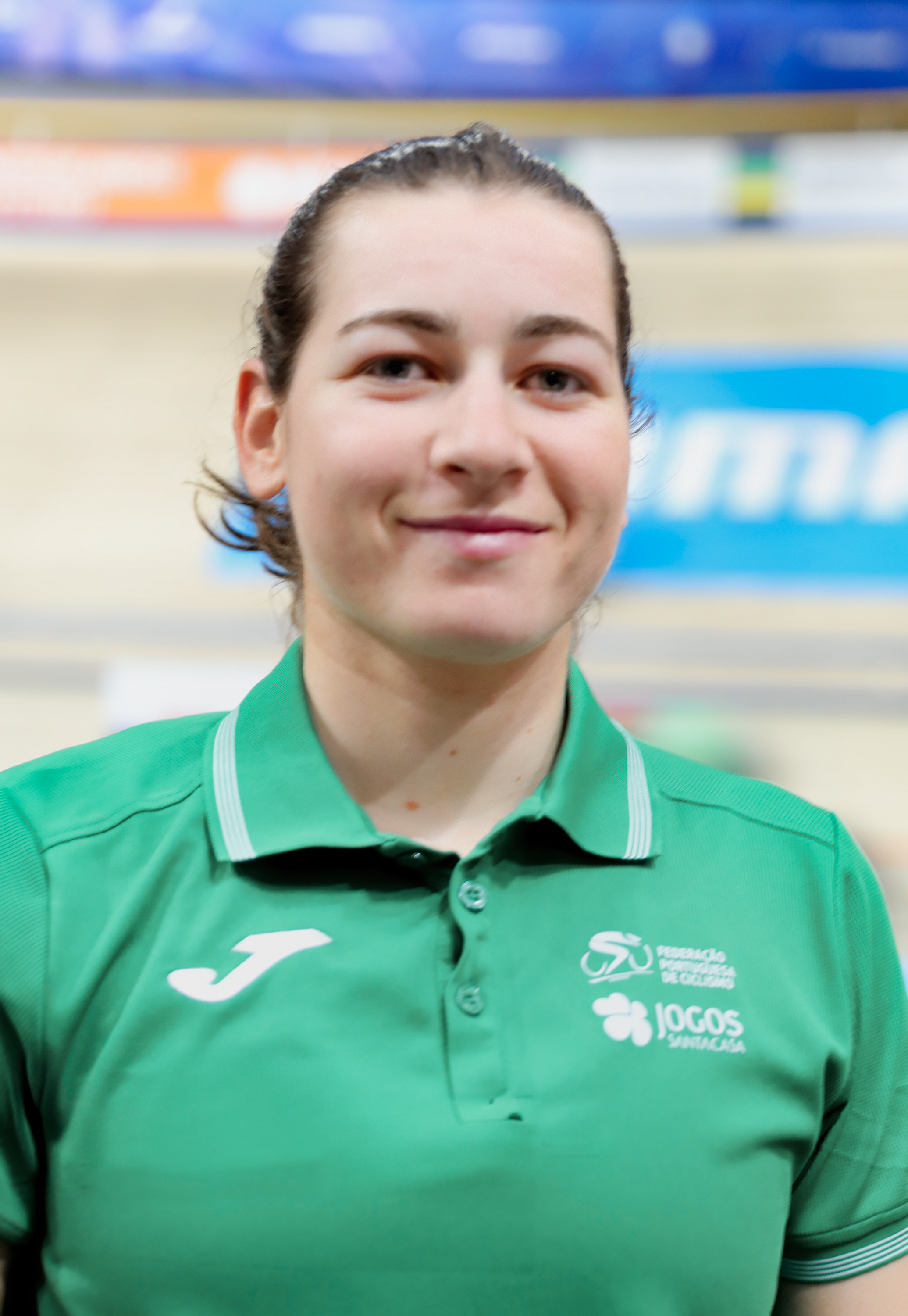
- Campos in 2024

Personal information
- Full name: Daniela Campos
- Born: 31 March 2002 (age 24) Portugal

Cycling career
- Sport: Cycling
- Current team: Eneicat–CMTeam
- Discipline: Road
- Role: Rider

Professional teams
- 2021–2023: Bizkaia–Durango
- 2024–: Eneicat–CMTeam

Major wins
- One-day races and Classics National Time Trial Championships (2021, 2022, 2024) National Road Race Championships (2022, 2024)
Medal record
Women's road cycling
Representing Portugal
Mediterranean Games
Silver medal – second place	2022 Oran	Road race

Daniela Maria Voets de Sousa Campos (born 31 March 2002) is a Portuguese professional racing cyclist, who currently rides for UCI Women's Continental Team Eneicat–CMTeam.

== Career ==
At the European Junior Track championships in 2020 she won a bronze medal in the Omnium. She rode in the 2021 World championships and was the only Portuguese women to finish. In 2022 she won the Portuguese National Time Trial Championships for a second time.

== Major results ==
2019
1st Road race, National Junior Road Championships
2020
European Junior Road Championships

5th Road race
9th Time trial

2021
National Road Championships

1st Time trial
2nd Road race

2022
National Road Championships

1st Road race
1st Time trial

Mediterranean Games

2nd Road race
10th Time trial

2024
National Road Championships

1st Road race
1st Time trial

Vuelta a Colombia Femenina

1st Young rider classification
1st Stage 6 (ITT)

1st Stage 4 Vuelta Femenina a Guatemala
3rd Overall Volta a Portugal Feminina
