= Eneicat–CMTeam =

Spanish cycling team

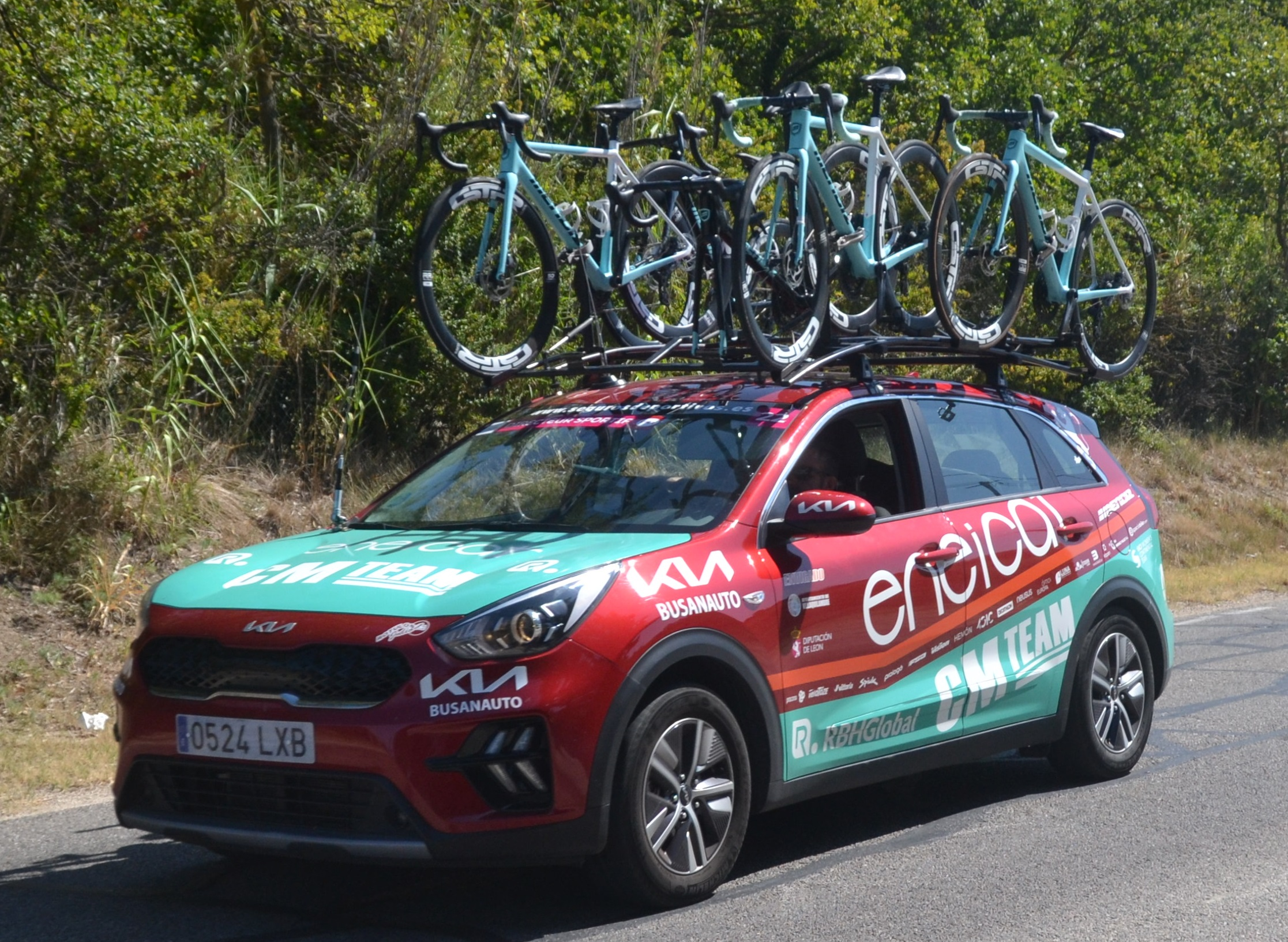
- A team car in 2023

Team information
- UCI code: EIC
- Founded: 2018
- Discipline: Road
- Status: UCI Women's Team (2019); UCI Women's Continental Team (2020–present)

Team name history
- 2018; 2019; 2020; 2021–2022; 2023; 2024–: Eneicue Cycling Team; Eneicat Cycling Team; Eneicat–RBH Global; Eneicat–RBH Global–Martín Villa; Eneicat–CMTeam–Seguros Deportivos; Eneicat–CMTeam

Eneicat–CMTeam is a professional cycling team which competes in elite road bicycle racing events such as the UCI Women's World Tour. The team was established in 2018, registering with the UCI for the 2019 season.

== Team roster ==
As of 25 September 2024.

Rider	Date of birth
Andrea Alzate (COL)	9 October 1996 (age 29)
Valentina Basilico (ITA)	17 April 2003 (age 23)
Alessia Bulleri (ITA)	19 July 1993 (age 33)
Daniela Campos (POR)	31 March 2002 (age 24)
Ariana Gilabert (ESP)	12 April 2000 (age 26)

Rider	Date of birth
Isabel Martin (ESP)	1 May 1999 (age 27)
Adèle Normand (CAN)	5 January 2002 (age 24)
Claudia San Justo (ESP)	3 October 2003 (age 22)
Carolina Vargas (COL)	28 August 2002 (age 24)

== Major results ==
2021
Abadiño Cyclo-cross, Alessia Bulleri

2022
Women Cycling Pro Costa De Almería, Aranza Villalón
GP Villaquilambre, Lija Laizane
Juegos Bolivarianos Road Race, Aranza Villalón
Overall Vuelta a Formosa, Aranza Villalón

Stage 3, Aranza Villalón

2023
GP Cantabria Deporte–Trofeo Villa de Noja, Lucía Perez
Gran Premio Igartza, Lucía Perez
Trofeo del Bajo Andarax, Andrea Alzate
Prologue Vuelta Femenina a Guatemala, Andrea Alzate
Stages 2 & 4 Vuelta Femenina a Guatemala, Serika Guluma

== National Champions ==
2019
Latvia Road Race, Lija Laizāne

2020
Spain Track (Madison), Eukene Larrarte
Greece Time Trial, Varvara Fasoi

2021
Estonia Road Race, Aidi Tuisk
Greece Road Race, Varvara Fasoi

2022
Greece Road Race, Varvara Fasoi
Estonia Road Race, Aidi Tuisk

2023
Chile Time Trial, Aranza Villalón
