= Cynisca Cycling =

Women's road cycling team

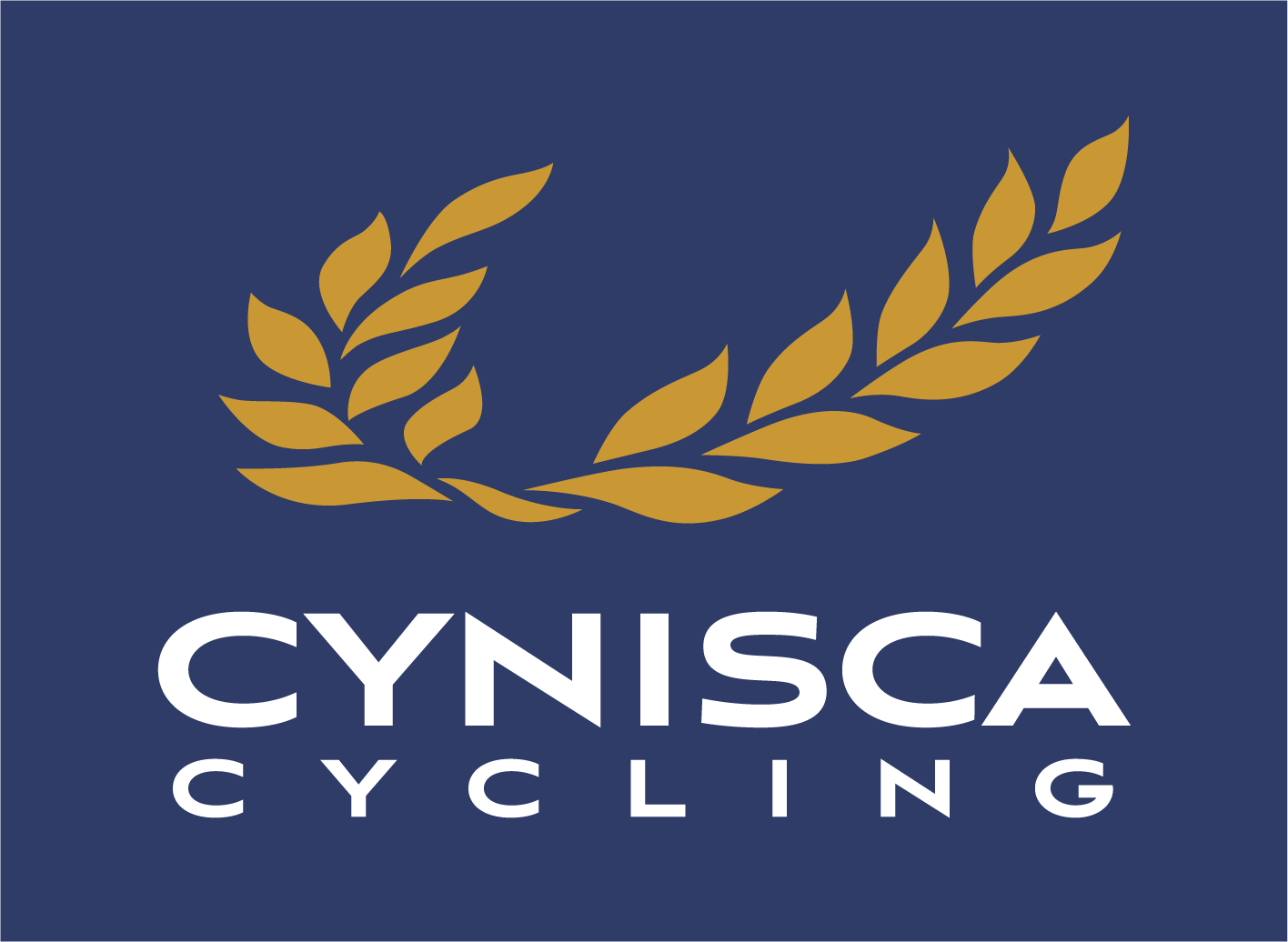

Team information
- UCI code: CYN
- Registered: USA
- Founded: 2023
- Disciplines: Road, Gravel
- Status: UCI Women's Continental Team (2023–)
- Bicycles: Ventum
- Components: Shimano, Enduro Bearings, Vittoria; Kits- PEARL iZUMi

Team name history
- 2023–: Cynisca Cycling

Team and Staff
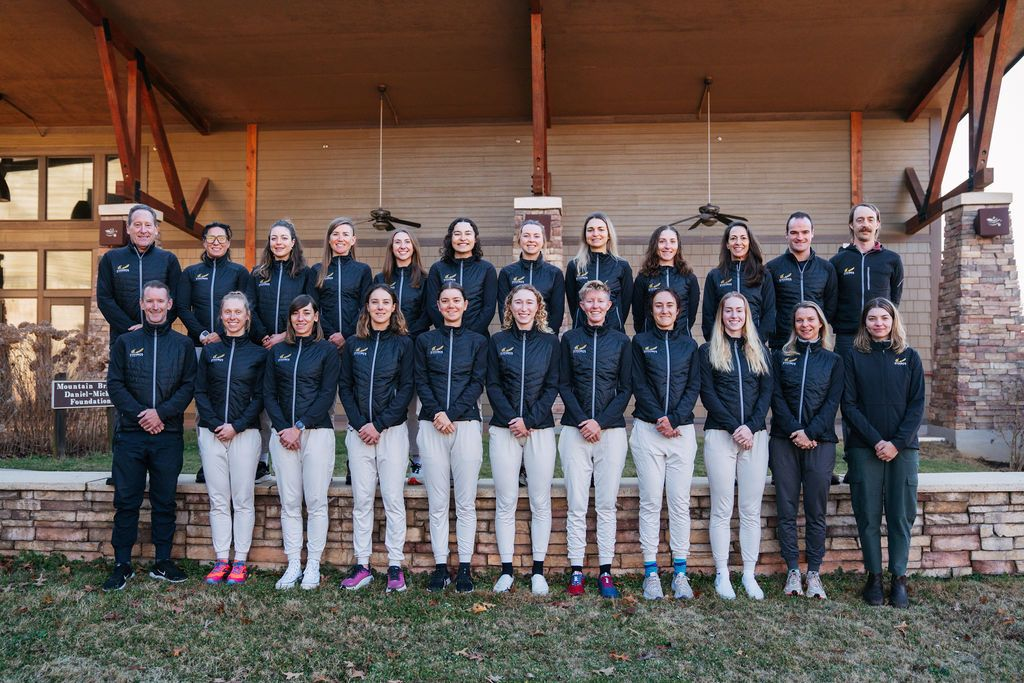
- February 2024

Cynisca Cycling is a USA-based UCI Continental women’s cycling team that began racing in 2023. The team has more North American riders than any other UCI Continental or World Tour team. Their mission is to empower women through cycling.

== Major results ==
2024
Unbound 100, Lauren Stephens, First Place
Pan American Road Race Championships, Lauren Stephens, First Place
Pan American Time Trial, Lauren Stephens, Second Place
U23 Road Race National Championships, Nicole Steinmetz, First Place
U23 Criterium National Championships, Chloe Patrick, First Place
USA Cycling National Pro Road Championships, Lauren Stephens, Fourth Place
Tour of the Gila Overall, Lauren Stephens, First Place
Tour of the Gila Stage 4, Chloe Patrick, First Place
Tour of the Gila Stage 3, Lauren Stephens, First Place
Tour of the Gila Stage 1, Lauren Stephens, First Place
Sea Otter Classic, Nicole Steinmetz, First Place
Levi's Gran Fondo, Lauren Stephens, Second Place
Redlands Bicycle Classic Overall, Mara Roldan, Third Place
Redlands Bicycle Classic, Stage 5, Mara Roldan, First Place
Redlands Bicycle Classic, Stage 1, Mara Roldan, First Place
Tour de Normandie, Stage 3, Lauren Stephens, First Place
Clasica De Almeria, Lauren Stephens, First Place
2023
Sea Otter Classic Road Race, Ashley Frye, Second Place
Joe Martin Classic Stage Race, Emilie Fortin, Third Place
Clasica de Almeria, Emilie Fortin, First Place

== Team roster ==
As of 23 May 2024

Rider	Date of birth
Claire Windsor (USA)	February 20, 2000 (age 26)
Allison Mrugal (USA)	July 21, 1996 (age 30)
Lauren Stephens (USA)	December 28, 1986 (age 39)
Nicole Steinmetz (USA)	May 21, 2003 (age 23)
Katherine Sarkisov (USA)	February 28, 2004 (age 22)
Mara Roldan (Canada)	April 7, 2004 (age 22)
Greta Richioud (France)	October 11, 1996 (age 29)
Chloe Patrick (USA)	October 31, 2004 (age 21)

Rider	Date of birth
Cara O'Neill (USA)	March 24, 1999 (age 27)
Fiona Mangan (Ireland)	May 16, 1996 (age 30)
Gabrielle Lehnert (USA)	January 19, 2001 (age 25)
Ashley Frye (USA)	July 31, 2000 (age 26)
Chloé Fourmigué-Villacampa (France)	March 18, 1998 (age 28)
Émilie Fortin (Canada)	May 21, 1999 (age 27)
Tess Edwards (USA)	August 17, 2001 (age 25)
Pauline Allin (France)	May 2, 1995 (age 31)
