= 2021 Tour Cycliste Féminin International de l'Ardèche =

Race details
- Dates: 8–14 September 2021
- Stages: 7
- Distance: 821.56 km (510.49 mi)
- Winning time: 23h 18' 12"

Results
Jersey awarded to the overall winner	Winner	Leah Thomas (USA)	(Movistar Team)
	Second	Mavi García (ESP)	(Alé BTC Ljubljana)
	Third	Ane Santesteban (ESP)	(Team BikeExchange)
Jersey awarded to the mountains classification winner	Mountains	Pauliena Rooijakkers (NED)	(Liv Racing)
Jersey awarded to the young rider classification winner	Young rider	Henrietta Christie (NZL)	(Bepink)
Jersey awarded to the combination classification winner	Combination	Pauliena Rooijakkers (NED)	(Liv Racing)
Jersey awarded to the sprints classification winner	Sprints	Leah Thomas (USA)	(Movistar Team)
	Team	Team BikeExchange	

The 2021 Tour Cycliste Féminin International de l'Ardèche was the 19th edition of the Tour Cycliste Féminin International de l'Ardèche road cycling stage race, which was held from 8 to 14 September 2021 in southeastern France. The race was categorised as a 2.1 event.

== Teams ==
Five of the nine UCI Women's WorldTeams, 14 UCI Women's Continental Teams, and one Elite Domestic team made up the 20 teams that participated in the race. Ten teams entered a full squad of six riders, while eight teams entered only five riders. Furthermore, two teams, Bingoal Casino–Chevalmeire and Team Farto–BTC entered only four riders. Of the 108 riders to start the race, 79 finished.

UCI Women's WorldTeams

- Alé BTC Ljubljana
- Liv Racing
- Movistar Team
- Team BikeExchange
- Trek–Segafredo

UCI Women's Continental Teams

- A.R. Monex
- Arkéa Pro Cycling Team
- Bepink
- Bingoal Casino–Chevalmeire
- Doltcini–Van Eyck–Proximus
- GT Krush Tunap
- Lviv Cycling Team
- Massi–Tactic
- NXTG Racing
- Sopela Women's Team
- Stade Rochelais Charente-Maritime
- Team Farto–BTC
- Tibco–Silicon Valley Bank
- Top Girls Fassa Bortolo

Elite Domestic Teams

- MAT ATOM Deweloper Wrocław

== Route ==
Stage characteristics and winners
Stage	Date	Course	Distance	Type	Winner
1	8 September	Aubenas to Barjac	111.95 km (69.56 mi)	Hilly stage	Arlenis Sierra (CUB)
2	9 September	Anneyron to Beauchastel	122.64 km (76.20 mi)	Medium-mountain stage	Leah Thomas (USA)
3	10 September	Avignon to Avignon	133.86 km (83.18 mi)	Flat stage	Chloe Hosking (AUS)
4	11 September	Aumont-Aubrac to Mont Lozère	119.56 km (74.29 mi)	Mountain stage	Ruth Winder (USA)
5	12 September	Saint-Jean-en-Royans to Saint-Jean-en-Royans	113.5 km (70.5 mi)	Mountain stage	Marta Bastianelli (ITA)
6	13 September	Anduze to Goudargues	138.52 km (86.07 mi)	Flat stage	Teniel Campbell (TRI)
7	14 September	Le Pouzin to Privas	81.53 km (50.66 mi)	Mountain stage	Lucinda Brand (NED)
Total			821.56 km (510.49 mi)		

== Stages ==
=== Stage 1 ===
8 September 2021 — Aubenas to Barjac, 111.95 km (69.56 mi)

Stage 1 Result
Rank	Rider	Team	Time
1	Arlenis Sierra (CUB)	A.R. Monex	3h 10' 02"
2	Marta Bastianelli (ITA)	Alé BTC Ljubljana	+ 0"
3	Sheyla Gutiérrez (ESP)	Movistar Team	+ 0"
4	Lizzie Deignan (GBR)	Trek–Segafredo	+ 0"
5	Lauren Stephens (USA)	Tibco–Silicon Valley Bank	+ 0"
6	Mieke Docx (BEL)	Doltcini–Van Eyck–Proximus	+ 0"
7	Ruth Winder (USA)	Trek–Segafredo	+ 0"
8	Jeanne Korevaar (NED)	Liv Racing	+ 0"
9	Lucie Jounier (FRA)	Arkéa Pro Cycling Team	+ 0"
10	Agnieszka Skalniak-Sójka (POL)	MAT ATOM Deweloper Wrocław	+ 0"

General classification after Stage 1
Rank	Rider	Team	Time
1	Arlenis Sierra (CUB)	A.R. Monex	3h 10' 02"
2	Marta Bastianelli (ITA)	Alé BTC Ljubljana	+ 0"
3	Sheyla Gutiérrez (ESP)	Movistar Team	+ 0"
4	Lizzie Deignan (GBR)	Trek–Segafredo	+ 0"
5	Lauren Stephens (USA)	Tibco–Silicon Valley Bank	+ 0"
6	Mieke Docx (BEL)	Doltcini–Van Eyck–Proximus	+ 0"
7	Ruth Winder (USA)	Trek–Segafredo	+ 0"
8	Jeanne Korevaar (NED)	Liv Racing	+ 0"
9	Lucie Jounier (FRA)	Arkéa Pro Cycling Team	+ 0"
10	Agnieszka Skalniak-Sójka (POL)	MAT ATOM Deweloper Wrocław	+ 0"

=== Stage 2 ===
9 September 2021 — Anneyron to Beauchastel, 122.64 km (76.20 mi)

Stage 2 Result
Rank	Rider	Team	Time
1	Leah Thomas (USA)	Movistar Team	3h 24' 44"
2	Lizzie Deignan (GBR)	Trek–Segafredo	+ 9"
3	Thalita de Jong (NED)	Bingoal Casino–Chevalmeire	+ 9"
4	Arlenis Sierra (CUB)	A.R. Monex	+ 9"
5	Ane Santesteban (ESP)	Team BikeExchange	+ 9"
6	Mavi García (ESP)	Alé BTC Ljubljana	+ 9"
7	Jeanne Korevaar (NED)	Liv Racing	+ 9"
8	Veronica Ewers (USA)	Tibco–Silicon Valley Bank	+ 9"
9	Špela Kern (SLO)	Massi–Tactic	+ 9"
10	Pauliena Rooijakkers (NED)	Liv Racing	+ 9"

General classification after Stage 2
Rank	Rider	Team	Time
1	Leah Thomas (USA)	Movistar Team	6h 34' 46"
2	Arlenis Sierra (CUB)	A.R. Monex	+ 9"
3	Lizzie Deignan (GBR)	Trek–Segafredo	+ 9"
4	Jeanne Korevaar (NED)	Liv Racing	+ 9"
5	Thalita de Jong (NED)	Bingoal Casino–Chevalmeire	+ 9"
6	Mavi García (ESP)	Alé BTC Ljubljana	+ 9"
7	Ane Santesteban (ESP)	Team BikeExchange	+ 9"
8	Špela Kern (SLO)	Massi–Tactic	+ 9"
9	Pauliena Rooijakkers (NED)	Liv Racing	+ 9"
10	Veronica Ewers (USA)	Tibco–Silicon Valley Bank	+ 9"

=== Stage 3 ===
10 September 2021 — Avignon to Avignon, 133.86 km (83.18 mi)

Stage 3 Result
Rank	Rider	Team	Time
1	Chloe Hosking (AUS)	Trek–Segafredo	3h 39' 11"
2	Barbara Guarischi (ITA)	Movistar Team	+ 0"
3	Arlenis Sierra (CUB)	A.R. Monex	+ 0"
4	Charlotte Kool (NED)	NXTG Racing	+ 0"
5	Marta Bastianelli (ITA)	Alé BTC Ljubljana	+ 1"
6	Jeanne Korevaar (NED)	Liv Racing	+ 1"
7	Katarzyna Wilkos (POL)	MAT ATOM Deweloper Wrocław	+ 1"
8	Lizzie Deignan (GBR)	Trek–Segafredo	+ 1"
9	Nina Kessler (NED)	Tibco–Silicon Valley Bank	+ 1"
10	Thalita de Jong (NED)	Bingoal Casino–Chevalmeire	+ 1"

General classification after Stage 3
Rank	Rider	Team	Time
1	Leah Thomas (USA)	Movistar Team	10h 13' 58"
2	Arlenis Sierra (CUB)	A.R. Monex	+ 8"
3	Lizzie Deignan (GBR)	Trek–Segafredo	+ 9"
4	Jeanne Korevaar (NED)	Liv Racing	+ 9"
5	Thalita de Jong (NED)	Bingoal Casino–Chevalmeire	+ 9"
6	Ane Santesteban (ESP)	Team BikeExchange	+ 9"
7	Mavi García (ESP)	Alé BTC Ljubljana	+ 9"
8	Špela Kern (SLO)	Massi–Tactic	+ 9"
9	Pauliena Rooijakkers (NED)	Liv Racing	+ 9"
10	Veronica Ewers (USA)	Tibco–Silicon Valley Bank	+ 9"

=== Stage 4 ===
11 September 2021 — Aumont-Aubrac to Mont Lozère, 119.56 km (74.29 mi)

Stage 4 Result
Rank	Rider	Team	Time
1	Ruth Winder (USA)	Trek–Segafredo	3h 28' 23"
2	Leah Thomas (USA)	Movistar Team	+ 2' 18"
3	Mavi García (ESP)	Alé BTC Ljubljana	+ 2' 18"
4	Ane Santesteban (ESP)	Team BikeExchange	+ 2' 18"
5	Veronica Ewers (USA)	Tibco–Silicon Valley Bank	+ 2' 24"
6	Thalita de Jong (NED)	Bingoal Casino–Chevalmeire	+ 2' 24"
7	Pauliena Rooijakkers (NED)	Liv Racing	+ 2' 24"
8	Justine Ghekiere (BEL)	Bingoal Casino–Chevalmeire	+ 2' 24"
9	Lizzie Deignan (GBR)	Trek–Segafredo	+ 2' 27"
10	Nadia Quagliotto (ITA)	Bepink	+ 2' 36"

General classification after Stage 4
Rank	Rider	Team	Time
1	Leah Thomas (USA)	Movistar Team	13h 44' 39"
2	Ane Santesteban (ESP)	Team BikeExchange	+ 9"
3	Mavi García (ESP)	Alé BTC Ljubljana	+ 9"
4	Thalita de Jong (NED)	Bingoal Casino–Chevalmeire	+ 15"
5	Pauliena Rooijakkers (NED)	Liv Racing	+ 15"
6	Veronica Ewers (USA)	Tibco–Silicon Valley Bank	+ 15"
7	Lizzie Deignan (GBR)	Trek–Segafredo	+ 18"
8	Arlenis Sierra (CUB)	A.R. Monex	+ 34"
9	Jeanne Korevaar (NED)	Liv Racing	+ 35"
10	Špela Kern (SLO)	Massi–Tactic	+ 42"

=== Stage 5 ===
12 September 2021 — Saint-Jean-en-Royans to Saint-Jean-en-Royans, 113.5 km (70.5 mi)

Stage 5 Result
Rank	Rider	Team	Time
1	Marta Bastianelli (ITA)	Alé BTC Ljubljana	3h 30' 59"
2	Emma Langley (USA)	Tibco–Silicon Valley Bank	+ 22"
3	Lucinda Brand (NED)	Trek–Segafredo	+ 41"
4	Mavi García (ESP)	Alé BTC Ljubljana	+ 2' 05"
5	Leah Thomas (USA)	Movistar Team	+ 2' 05"
6	Ane Santesteban (ESP)	Team BikeExchange	+ 2' 05"
7	Nadia Quagliotto (ITA)	Bepink	+ 2' 09"
8	Veronica Ewers (USA)	Tibco–Silicon Valley Bank	+ 2' 10"
9	Pauliena Rooijakkers (NED)	Liv Racing	+ 2' 10"
10	Ruth Winder (USA)	Trek–Segafredo	+ 2' 13"

General classification after Stage 5
Rank	Rider	Team	Time
1	Leah Thomas (USA)	Movistar Team	17h 17' 43"
2	Ane Santesteban (ESP)	Team BikeExchange	+ 9"
3	Mavi García (ESP)	Alé BTC Ljubljana	+ 9"
4	Pauliena Rooijakkers (NED)	Liv Racing	+ 20"
5	Veronica Ewers (USA)	Tibco–Silicon Valley Bank	+ 20"
6	Thalita de Jong (NED)	Bingoal Casino–Chevalmeire	+ 1' 43"
7	Arlenis Sierra (CUB)	A.R. Monex	+ 2' 02"
8	Jeanne Korevaar (NED)	Liv Racing	+ 2' 03"
9	Špela Kern (SLO)	Massi–Tactic	+ 2' 10"
10	Ruth Winder (USA)	Trek–Segafredo	+ 4' 35"

=== Stage 6 ===
13 September 2021 — Anduze to Goudargues, 138.52 km (86.07 mi)

Stage 6 Result
Rank	Rider	Team	Time
1	Teniel Campbell (TRI)	Team BikeExchange	3h 33' 57"
2	Nina Kessler (NED)	Tibco–Silicon Valley Bank	+ 0"
3	Lauretta Hanson (AUS)	Trek–Segafredo	+ 0"
4	Mireia Benito (ESP)	Massi–Tactic	+ 0"
5	Rossella Ratto (ITA)	Bingoal Casino–Chevalmeire	+ 0"
6	Alba Teruel (ESP)	Movistar Team	+ 0"
7	Ayesha McGowan (USA)	Liv Racing	+ 0"
8	Katia Ragusa (ITA)	A.R. Monex	+ 0"
9	Amandine Fouquenet (FRA)	Arkéa Pro Cycling Team	+ 0"
10	Silvia Valsecchi (ITA)	Bepink	+ 0"

General classification after Stage 6
Rank	Rider	Team	Time
1	Leah Thomas (USA)	Movistar Team	20h 55' 08"
2	Mavi García (ESP)	Alé BTC Ljubljana	+ 9"
3	Ane Santesteban (ESP)	Team BikeExchange	+ 9"
4	Veronica Ewers (USA)	Tibco–Silicon Valley Bank	+ 20"
5	Pauliena Rooijakkers (NED)	Liv Racing	+ 20"
6	Thalita de Jong (NED)	Bingoal Casino–Chevalmeire	+ 1' 43"
7	Arlenis Sierra (CUB)	A.R. Monex	+ 2' 02"
8	Jeanne Korevaar (NED)	Liv Racing	+ 2' 03"
9	Špela Kern (SLO)	Massi–Tactic	+ 2' 10"
10	Marta Bastianelli (ITA)	Alé BTC Ljubljana	+ 6' 53"

=== Stage 7 ===
14 September 2021 — Le Pouzin to Privas, 81.53 km (50.66 mi)

Stage 7 Result
Rank	Rider	Team	Time
1	Lucinda Brand (NED)	Trek–Segafredo	2h 21' 44"
2	Jeanne Korevaar (NED)	Liv Racing	+ 47"
3	Lucy Kennedy (AUS)	Team BikeExchange	+ 1' 03"
4	Leah Thomas (USA)	Movistar Team	+ 1' 20"
5	Ane Santesteban (ESP)	Team BikeExchange	+ 1' 20"
6	Mavi García (ESP)	Alé BTC Ljubljana	+ 1' 20"
7	Pauliena Rooijakkers (NED)	Liv Racing	+ 1' 26"
8	Justine Ghekiere (BEL)	Bingoal Casino–Chevalmeire	+ 1' 35"
9	Veronica Ewers (USA)	Tibco–Silicon Valley Bank	+ 1' 52"
10	Amandine Fouquenet (FRA)	Arkéa Pro Cycling Team	+ 2' 22"

General classification after Stage 7
Rank	Rider	Team	Time
1	Leah Thomas (USA)	Movistar Team	23h 18' 12"
2	Mavi García (ESP)	Alé BTC Ljubljana	+ 9"
3	Ane Santesteban (ESP)	Team BikeExchange	+ 9"
4	Pauliena Rooijakkers (NED)	Liv Racing	+ 26"
5	Veronica Ewers (USA)	Tibco–Silicon Valley Bank	+ 52"
6	Jeanne Korevaar (NED)	Liv Racing	+ 1' 30"
7	Thalita de Jong (NED)	Bingoal Casino–Chevalmeire	+ 2' 47"
8	Arlenis Sierra (CUB)	A.R. Monex	+ 3' 10"
9	Špela Kern (SLO)	Massi–Tactic	+ 3' 24"
10	Lucinda Brand (NED)	Trek–Segafredo	+ 5' 39"

== Classification leadership table ==
Classification leadership by stage
Stage	Winner	General classification	Sprints classification	Mountains classification	Rushes classification	Combination classification	Young rider classification	Team classification	Combativity award
1	Arlenis Sierra	Arlenis Sierra	Arlenis Sierra	Katia Ragusa	Katia Ragusa	Katia Ragusa	Ally Wollaston	Movistar Team	Marissa Baks
2	Leah Thomas	Leah Thomas	Arlenis Sierra	Pauliena Rooijakkers	Katia Ragusa	Lizzie Deignan	Marine Allione	Liv Racing	Leah Thomas
3	Chloe Hosking	Leah Thomas	Arlenis Sierra	Pauliena Rooijakkers	Katia Ragusa	Pauliena Rooijakkers	Marine Allione	Liv Racing	Sabrina Stultiens
4	Ruth Winder	Leah Thomas	Arlenis Sierra	Pauliena Rooijakkers	Katia Ragusa	Pauliena Rooijakkers	Henrietta Christie	Trek–Segafredo	Lucie Jounier
5	Marta Bastianelli	Leah Thomas	Leah Thomas	Pauliena Rooijakkers	Katia Ragusa	Pauliena Rooijakkers	Henrietta Christie	Trek–Segafredo	Emma Langley
6	Teniel Campbell	Leah Thomas	Leah Thomas	Pauliena Rooijakkers	Katia Ragusa	Pauliena Rooijakkers	Henrietta Christie	Trek–Segafredo	Teniel Campbell
7	Lucinda Brand	Leah Thomas	Leah Thomas	Pauliena Rooijakkers	Nicole Steigenga	Pauliena Rooijakkers	Henrietta Christie	Team BikeExchange	Lucinda Brand
Final		Leah Thomas	Leah Thomas	Pauliena Rooijakkers	Nicole Steigenga	Pauliena Rooijakkers	Henrietta Christie	Team BikeExchange	Not awarded

- On stage 2, Marta Bastianelli, who was second in the sprints classification, wore the green jersey, because first-placed Arlenis Sierra wore the pink jersey as the leader of the general classification. Bastianelli wore the green jersey again on stages 6 and 7, but with Leah Thomas as the leader of the general classification.
- On stage 2, Nicole Steigenga, who was second in the rushes classification, wore the violet jersey, because first-placed Katia Ragusa wore the polka-dot jersey as the leader of the mountains classification. For the same reason, Marissa Baks, who was second in the combination classification, wore the blue jersey.
- On stage 4, Lizzie Deignan, who was second in the combination classification, wore the blue jersey, because first-placed Pauliena Rooijakkers wore the polka-dot jersey as the leader of the mountains classification. For the same reason, Thalita de Jong wore the blue jersey on stage 5, Ruth Winder on stage 6, and Emma Langley on stage 7.

== Final classification standings ==
Legend
Denotes the winner of the general classification	Denotes the winner of the rushes classification
Denotes the winner of the sprints classification	Denotes the winner of the combination classification
Denotes the winner of the mountains classification	Denotes the winner of the young rider classification
Denotes the winner of the combativity award	

=== General classification ===
Final general classification (1–10)
Rank	Rider	Team	Time
1	Leah Thomas (USA)	Movistar Team	23h 18' 12"
2	Mavi García (ESP)	Alé BTC Ljubljana	+ 9"
3	Ane Santesteban (ESP)	Team BikeExchange	+ 9"
4	Pauliena Rooijakkers (NED)	Liv Racing	+ 26"
5	Veronica Ewers (USA)	Tibco–Silicon Valley Bank	+ 52"
6	Jeanne Korevaar (NED)	Liv Racing	+ 1' 30"
7	Thalita de Jong (NED)	Bingoal Casino–Chevalmeire	+ 2' 47"
8	Arlenis Sierra (CUB)	A.R. Monex	+ 3' 10"
9	Špela Kern (SLO)	Massi–Tactic	+ 3' 24"
10	Lucinda Brand (NED)	Trek–Segafredo	+ 5' 39"

=== Sprints classification ===
Final sprints classification (1–10)
Rank	Rider	Team	Points
1	Leah Thomas (USA)	Movistar Team	38
2	Marta Bastianelli (ITA)	Alé BTC Ljubljana	31
3	Arlenis Sierra (CUB)	A.R. Monex	30
4	Mavi García (ESP)	Alé BTC Ljubljana	25
5	Ane Santesteban (ESP)	Team BikeExchange	24
6	Lucinda Brand (NED)	Trek–Segafredo	23
7	Jeanne Korevaar (NED)	Liv Racing	22
8	Lizzie Deignan (GBR)	Trek–Segafredo	22
9	Teniel Campbell (TRI)	Team BikeExchange	15
10	Veronica Ewers (USA)	Tibco–Silicon Valley Bank	14

=== Mountains classification ===
Final mountains classification (1–10)
Rank	Rider	Team	Points
1	Pauliena Rooijakkers (NED)	Liv Racing	45
2	Mavi García (ESP)	Alé BTC Ljubljana	30
3	Lucinda Brand (NED)	Trek–Segafredo	24
4	Katia Ragusa (ITA)	A.R. Monex	23
5	Lucy Kennedy (AUS)	Team BikeExchange	22
6	Leah Thomas (USA)	Movistar Team	20
7	Jeanne Korevaar (NED)	Liv Racing	16
8	Emma Langley (USA)	Tibco–Silicon Valley Bank	15
9	Ane Santesteban (ESP)	Team BikeExchange	13
10	Lucie Jounier (FRA)	Arkéa Pro Cycling Team	12

=== Rushes classification ===
Final rushes classification (1–10)
Rank	Rider	Team	Points
1	Nicole Steigenga (NED)	Doltcini–Van Eyck–Proximus	29
2	Katia Ragusa (ITA)	A.R. Monex	26
3	Thalita de Jong (NED)	Bingoal Casino–Chevalmeire	23
4	Amanda Spratt (AUS)	Team BikeExchange	13
5	Lucie Jounier (FRA)	Arkéa Pro Cycling Team	13
6	Marta Bastianelli (ITA)	Alé BTC Ljubljana	9
7	Emma Langley (USA)	Tibco–Silicon Valley Bank	8
8	Agnieszka Skalniak-Sójka (POL)	MAT ATOM Deweloper Wrocław	7
9	Nina Kessler (NED)	Tibco–Silicon Valley Bank	7
10	Agua Marina Espínola (PAR)	Massi–Tactic	7

=== Combination classification ===
Final combination classification (1–10)
Rank	Rider	Team	Points
1	Pauliena Rooijakkers (NED)	Liv Racing	18
2	Jeanne Korevaar (NED)	Liv Racing	27
3	Lucinda Brand (NED)	Trek–Segafredo	31
4	Thalita de Jong (NED)	Bingoal Casino–Chevalmeire	32
5	Marta Bastianelli (ITA)	Alé BTC Ljubljana	32
6	Emma Langley (USA)	Tibco–Silicon Valley Bank	34
7	Lucy Kennedy (AUS)	Team BikeExchange	37
8	Amanda Spratt (AUS)	Team BikeExchange	41
9	Katia Ragusa (ITA)	A.R. Monex	43
10	Lizzie Deignan (GBR)	Trek–Segafredo	44

=== Young rider classification ===
Final young rider classification (1–10)
Rank	Rider	Team	Time
1	Henrietta Christie (NZL)	Bepink	23h 29' 05"
2	Amandine Fouquenet (FRA)	Arkéa Pro Cycling Team	+ 8' 48"
3	Mireia Trias (ESP)	Massi–Tactic	+ 10' 41"
4	Ally Wollaston (NZL)	NXTG Racing	+ 32' 00"
5	Amelia Sharpe (GBR)	NXTG Racing	+ 35' 56"
6	Gaia Masetti (ITA)	Top Girls Fassa Bortolo	+ 37' 41"
7	Ilse Pluimers (NED)	NXTG Racing	+ 37' 43"
8	Maëva Squiban (FRA)	Stade Rochelais Charente-Maritime	+ 49' 13"
9	Alice Coutinho (FRA)	Sopela Women's Team	+ 51' 04"
10	Giorgia Vettorello (ITA)	Top Girls Fassa Bortolo	+ 54' 27"

=== Team classification ===
Final team classification (1–10)
Rank	Team	Time
1	Team BikeExchange	70h 20' 41"
2	Alé BTC Ljubljana	+ 1' 04"
3	Liv Racing	+ 5' 52"
4	Massi–Tactic	+ 17' 27"
5	Bingoal Casino–Chevalmeire	+ 17' 33"
6	Arkéa Pro Cycling Team	+ 23' 17"
7	Tibco–Silicon Valley Bank	+ 25' 06"
8	Movistar Team	+ 38' 07"
9	Bepink	+ 48' 06"
10	A.R. Monex	+ 57' 54"
