= 2022 Tour of Scandinavia =

Cycling race

2022 UCI Women's World Tour, race 19 of 23

Race details
- Dates: 9–14 August 2022
- Stages: 6
- Distance: 819 km (509 mi)
- Winning time: 20h 49' 55"

Results
Jersey awarded to the overall winner	Winner	Cecilie Uttrup Ludwig (DEN)
	Second	Liane Lippert (GER)
	Third	Alexandra Manly (AUS)
Jersey awarded to the points classification winner	Points	Alison Jackson (CAN)
Jersey awarded to the mountains classification winner	Mountains	Amber Kraak (NED)
Jersey awarded to the youth classification winner	Youth	Neve Bradbury (AUS)

The 2022 Tour of Scandinavia was the first edition of the expanded Ladies Tour of Norway, eighth edition overall. The race took place from 9 to 14 August 2022 and was the 19th event in the 2022 UCI Women's World Tour.

== Route and stages ==
Stage characteristics
Stage	Date	Course	Distance	Type	Winner
1	9 August	(Denmark) Copenhagen to Helsingør	145.6 km (90.5 mi)	Hilly stage	Marianne Vos (NED)
2	10 August	(Sweden) Orust to Strömstad	153.8 km (95.6 mi)	Hilly stage	Marianne Vos (NED)
3	11 August	(Norway) Moss to Sarpsborg	118.9 km (73.9 mi)	Hilly stage	Marianne Vos (NED)
4	12 August	Askim to Mysen	119.2 km (74.1 mi)	Hilly stage	Alexandra Manly (AUS)
5	13 August	Vikersund to Norefjell	127.4 km (79.2 mi)	Medium-mountain stage	Cecilie Uttrup Ludwig (DEN)
6	14 August	Lillestrøm to Halden	129.2 km (80.3 mi)	Hilly stage	Marianne Vos (NED)
Total			819 km (509 mi)		

== Stages ==
=== Stage 1 ===
9 August 2022 — Copenhagen to Helsingør, 145.6 km (90.5 mi)

Stage 1 Result
Rank	Rider	Team	Time
1	Marianne Vos (NED)	Team Jumbo–Visma	3h 37' 16"
2	Megan Jastrab (USA)	Team DSM	+ 0"
3	Shari Bossuyt (BEL)	Canyon//SRAM	+ 0"
4	Linda Riedmann (GER)	Team Jumbo–Visma	+ 0"
5	Karolina Kumiega (POL)	Valcar–Travel & Service	+ 0"
6	Amalie Dideriksen (DEN)	Trek–Segafredo	+ 0"
7	Tamara Dronova	Roland Cogeas Edelweiss Squad	+ 0"
8	Gladys Verhulst (FRA)	Le Col–Wahoo	+ 0"
9	Emilia Fahlin (SWE)	FDJ Suez Futuroscope	+ 0"
10	Sofia Bertizzolo (ITA)	UAE Team ADQ	+ 0"

General classification after Stage 1
Rank	Rider	Team	Time
1	Marianne Vos (NED)	Team Jumbo–Visma	3h 37' 06"
2	Megan Jastrab (USA)	Team DSM	+ 4"
3	Shari Bossuyt (BEL)	Canyon//SRAM	+ 6"
4	Linda Riedmann (GER)	Team Jumbo–Visma	+ 10"
5	Karolina Kumiega (POL)	Valcar–Travel & Service	+ 10"
6	Amalie Dideriksen (DEN)	Trek–Segafredo	+ 10"
7	Tamara Dronova	Roland Cogeas Edelweiss Squad	+ 10"
8	Gladys Verhulst (FRA)	Le Col–Wahoo	+ 10"
9	Emilia Fahlin (SWE)	FDJ Suez Futuroscope	+ 10"
10	Sofia Bertizzolo (ITA)	UAE Team ADQ	+ 10"

=== Stage 2 ===
10 August 2022 — Orust to Strömstad, 153.8 km (95.6 mi)

Stage 2 Result
Rank	Rider	Team	Time
1	Marianne Vos (NED)	Team Jumbo–Visma	3h 46' 42"
2	Emilia Fahlin (SWE)	FDJ Suez Futuroscope	+ 0"
3	Barbara Guarischi (ITA)	Movistar Team	+ 0"
4	Megan Jastrab (USA)	Team DSM	+ 0"
5	Alexandra Manly (AUS)	Team BikeExchange–Jayco	+ 0"
6	Tamara Dronova	Roland Cogeas Edelweiss Squad	+ 0"
7	Floortje Mackaij (NED)	Team DSM	+ 0"
8	Shari Bossuyt (BEL)	Canyon//SRAM	+ 0"
9	Amalie Dideriksen (DEN)	Trek–Segafredo	+ 0"
10	Demi Vollering (NED)	SD Worx	+ 0"

General classification after Stage 2
Rank	Rider	Team	Time
1	Marianne Vos (NED)	Team Jumbo–Visma	7h 23' 38"
2	Megan Jastrab (USA)	Team DSM	+ 14"
3	Emilia Fahlin (SWE)	FDJ Suez Futuroscope	+ 14"
4	Shari Bossuyt (BEL)	Canyon//SRAM	+ 16"
5	Barbara Guarischi (ITA)	Movistar Team	+ 16"
6	Tamara Dronova	Roland Cogeas Edelweiss Squad	+ 20"
7	Amalie Dideriksen (DEN)	Trek–Segafredo	+ 20"
8	Floortje Mackaij (NED)	Team DSM	+ 20"
9	Alexandra Manly (AUS)	Team BikeExchange–Jayco	+ 20"
10	Margaux Vigie (FRA)	Valcar–Travel & Service	+ 20"

=== Stage 3 ===
11 August 2022 — Moss to Sarpsborg, 118.9 km (73.9 mi)

Stage 3 Result
Rank	Rider	Team	Time
1	Marianne Vos (NED)	Team Jumbo–Visma	3h 46' 42"
2	Cecilie Uttrup Ludwig (DEN)	FDJ Suez Futuroscope	+ 0"
3	Shari Bossuyt (BEL)	Canyon//SRAM	+ 0"
4	Alexandra Manly (AUS)	Team BikeExchange–Jayco	+ 0"
5	Gladys Verhulst (FRA)	Le Col–Wahoo	+ 0"
6	Lucinda Brand (NED)	Trek–Segafredo	+ 0"
7	Sofia Bertizzolo (ITA)	UAE Team ADQ	+ 0"
8	Yara Kastelijn (NED)	Plantur–Pura	+ 0"
9	Floortje Mackaij (NED)	Team DSM	+ 0"
10	Marthe Truyen (BEL)	Plantur–Pura	+ 0"

General classification after Stage 3
Rank	Rider	Team	Time
1	Marianne Vos (NED)	Team Jumbo–Visma	10h 28' 08"
2	Shari Bossuyt (BEL)	Canyon//SRAM	+ 22"
3	Cecilie Uttrup Ludwig (DEN)	FDJ Suez Futuroscope	+ 24"
4	Alexandra Manly (AUS)	Team BikeExchange–Jayco	+ 30"
5	Floortje Mackaij (NED)	Team DSM	+ 30"
6	Sofia Bertizzolo (ITA)	UAE Team ADQ	+ 30"
7	Megan Jastrab (USA)	Team DSM	+ 30"
8	Gladys Verhulst (FRA)	Le Col–Wahoo	+ 30"
9	Margaux Vigie (FRA)	Valcar–Travel & Service	+ 30"
10	Marthe Truyen (BEL)	Plantur–Pura	+ 30"

=== Stage 4 ===
12 August 2022 — Askim to Mysen, 119.2 km (74.1 mi)

Stage 4 Result
Rank	Rider	Team	Time
1	Alexandra Manly (AUS)	Team BikeExchange–Jayco	2h 53' 44"
2	Chloe Hosking (AUS)	Trek–Segafredo	+ 0"
3	Laura Tomasi (ITA)	UAE Team ADQ	+ 0"
4	Alice Barnes (GBR)	Canyon//SRAM	+ 0"
5	Anouska Koster (NED)	Le Col–Wahoo	+ 0"
6	Marianne Vos (NED)	Team Jumbo–Visma	+ 0"
7	Sofia Bertizzolo (ITA)	UAE Team ADQ	+ 0"
8	Lucinda Brand (NED)	Trek–Segafredo	+ 0"
9	Emilia Fahlin (SWE)	FDJ Suez Futuroscope	+ 0"
10	Shari Bossuyt (BEL)	Canyon//SRAM	+ 0"

General classification after Stage 4
Rank	Rider	Team	Time
1	Marianne Vos (NED)	Team Jumbo–Visma	13h 21' 52"
2	Alexandra Manly (AUS)	Team BikeExchange–Jayco	+ 20"
3	Shari Bossuyt (BEL)	Canyon//SRAM	+ 22"
4	Cecilie Uttrup Ludwig (DEN)	FDJ Suez Futuroscope	+ 24"
5	Sofia Bertizzolo (ITA)	UAE Team ADQ	+ 30"
6	Floortje Mackaij (NED)	Team DSM	+ 30"
7	Megan Jastrab (USA)	Team DSM	+ 30"
8	Gladys Verhulst (FRA)	Le Col–Wahoo	+ 30"
9	Marthe Truyen (BEL)	Plantur–Pura	+ 30"
10	Susanne Andersen (NOR)	Uno-X Pro Cycling Team	+ 30"

=== Stage 5 ===
13 August 2022 — Vikersund to Norefjell, 127.4 km (79.2 mi)

Stage 5 Result
Rank	Rider	Team	Time
1	Cecilie Uttrup Ludwig (DEN)	FDJ Suez Futuroscope	3h 26' 24"
2	Liane Lippert (GER)	Team DSM	+ 1"
3	Julie Van de Velde (BEL)	Plantur–Pura	+ 31"
4	Josie Nelson (GBR)	Team Coop–Hitec Products	+ 38"
5	Alexandra Manly (AUS)	Team BikeExchange–Jayco	+ 38"
6	Tamara Dronova	Roland Cogeas Edelweiss Squad	+ 38"
7	Anouska Koster (NED)	Team Jumbo–Visma	+ 38"
8	Esmée Peperkamp (NED)	Team DSM	+ 38"
9	Lucinda Brand (NED)	Trek–Segafredo	+ 38"
10	Neve Bradbury (AUS)	Canyon//SRAM	+ 38"

General classification after Stage 5
Rank	Rider	Team	Time
1	Cecilie Uttrup Ludwig (DEN)	FDJ Suez Futuroscope	16h 48' 30"
2	Liane Lippert (GER)	Team DSM	+ 17"
3	Alexandra Manly (AUS)	Team BikeExchange–Jayco	+ 44"
4	Julie Van de Velde (BEL)	Plantur–Pura	+ 55"
5	Tamara Dronova	Roland Cogeas Edelweiss Squad	+ 1' 00"
6	Neve Bradbury (AUS)	Canyon//SRAM	+ 1' 00"
7	Katrine Aalerud (NOR)	Movistar Team	+ 1' 00"
8	Anouska Koster (NED)	Team Jumbo–Visma	+ 1' 06"
9	Esmée Peperkamp (NED)	Team DSM	+ 1' 06"
10	Lucinda Brand (NED)	Trek–Segafredo	+ 1' 08"

=== Stage 6 ===
14 August 2022 — Lillestrøm to Halden, 129.2 km (80.3 mi)

Stage 6 Result
Rank	Rider	Team	Time
1	Marianne Vos (NED)	Team Jumbo–Visma	4h 01' 25"
2	Shari Bossuyt (BEL)	Canyon//SRAM	+ 0"
3	Barbara Guarischi (ITA)	Movistar Team	+ 0"
4	Sofia Bertizzolo (ITA)	UAE Team ADQ	+ 0"
5	Lucinda Brand (NED)	Trek–Segafredo	+ 0"
6	Nina Kessler (NED)	Team BikeExchange–Jayco	+ 0"
7	Tamara Dronova	Roland Cogeas Edelweiss Squad	+ 0"
8	Alexandra Manly (AUS)	Team BikeExchange–Jayco	+ 0"
9	Anouska Koster (NED)	Team Jumbo–Visma	+ 0"
10	Gladys Verhulst (FRA)	Le Col–Wahoo	+ 0"

Final general classification
Rank	Rider	Team	Time
1	Cecilie Uttrup Ludwig (DEN)	FDJ Suez Futuroscope	20h 49' 55"
2	Liane Lippert (GER)	Team DSM	+ 17"
3	Alexandra Manly (AUS)	Team BikeExchange–Jayco	+ 44"
4	Tamara Dronova	Roland Cogeas Edelweiss Squad	+ 1' 00"
5	Neve Bradbury (AUS)	Canyon//SRAM	+ 1' 00"
6	Julie Van de Velde (BEL)	Plantur–Pura	+ 1' 03"
7	Anouska Koster (NED)	Team Jumbo–Visma	+ 1' 06"
8	Lucinda Brand (NED)	Trek–Segafredo	+ 1' 08"
9	Katrine Aalerud (NOR)	Movistar Team	+ 1' 08"
10	Erica Magnaldi (ITA)	UAE Team ADQ	+ 1' 09"

== Classification leadership ==
Classification leadership by stage
Stage	Winner	General classification	Points classification	Mountains classification	Young rider classification	Team classification
1	Marianne Vos	Marianne Vos	Alison Jackson	Amber Kraak	Megan Jastrab	Valcar–Travel & Service
2	Marianne Vos	Marianne Vos	Alison Jackson	Amber Kraak	Megan Jastrab	Team DSM
3	Marianne Vos	Marianne Vos	Alison Jackson	Amber Kraak	Shari Bossuyt	UAE Team ADQ
4	Alexandra Manly	Marianne Vos	Alison Jackson	Amber Kraak	Shari Bossuyt	UAE Team ADQ
5	Cecilie Uttrup Ludwig	Cecilie Uttrup Ludwig	Alison Jackson	Amber Kraak	Neve Bradbury	Team DSM
6	Marianne Vos	Cecilie Uttrup Ludwig	Alison Jackson	Amber Kraak	Neve Bradbury	Team DSM
Final		Cecilie Uttrup Ludwig	Alison Jackson	Amber Kraak	Neve Bradbury	Team DSM

== Classification standings ==
Legend
Denotes the winner of the general classification	Denotes the winner of the points classification
Denotes the winner of the mountains classification	Denotes the winner of the young rider classification
Denotes the winner of the team classification	

=== General classification ===
Final general classification (1–10)
Rank	Rider	Team	Time
1	Cecilie Uttrup Ludwig (DEN)	FDJ Suez Futuroscope	20h 49' 55"
2	Liane Lippert (GER)	Team DSM	+ 17"
3	Alexandra Manly (AUS)	Team BikeExchange–Jayco	+ 44"
4	Tamara Dronova	Roland Cogeas Edelweiss Squad	+ 1' 00"
5	Neve Bradbury (AUS)	Canyon//SRAM	+ 1' 00"
6	Julie Van de Velde (BEL)	Plantur–Pura	+ 1' 03"
7	Anouska Koster (NED)	Team Jumbo–Visma	+ 1' 06"
8	Lucinda Brand (NED)	Trek–Segafredo	+ 1' 08"
9	Katrine Aalerud (NOR)	Trek–Segafredo	+ 1' 08"
10	Erica Magnaldi (ITA)	UAE Team ADQ	+ 1' 09"

=== Points classification ===
Final points classification (1–10)
Rank	Rider	Team	Points
1	Alison Jackson (CAN)	Liv Racing Xstra	36
2	Marianne Vos (NED)	Team Jumbo–Visma	29
3	Eline van Rooijen (NED)	AG Insurance–NXTG	17
4	Shari Bossuyt (BEL)	Canyon//SRAM	15
5	Alexandra Manly (AUS)	Team BikeExchange–Jayco	12
6	Megan Jastrab (USA)	Team DSM	9
7	Katia Ragusa (ITA)	Liv Racing Xstra	8
8	Femke Markus (NED)	Parkhotel Valkenburg	8
9	Barbara Guarischi (ITA)	Movistar Team	8
10	Tamara Dronova	Roland Cogeas Edelweiss Squad	7

=== Mountains classification ===
Final mountains classification (1–10)
Rank	Rider	Team	Points
1	Amber Kraak (NED)	Team Jumbo–Visma	33
2	Josie Nelson (GBR)	Team Coop–Hitec Products	13
3	Anouska Koster (NED)	Team Jumbo–Visma	12
4	Cecilie Uttrup Ludwig (DEN)	FDJ Nouvelle-Aquitaine Futuroscope	10
5	Marianne Vos (NED)	Team Jumbo–Visma	10
6	Liane Lippert (GER)	Team DSM	9
7	Lourdes Oyarbide (ESP)	Movistar Team	8
8	Femke Gerritse (NED)	Parkhotel Valkenburg	8
9	Julie Van de Velde (BEL)	Plantur–Pura	8
10	Esmée Peperkamp (NED)	Team DSM	6

=== Young rider classification ===
Final young rider classification (1–10)
Rank	Rider	Team	Points
1	Neve Bradbury (AUS)	Canyon//SRAM	20h 50' 55"
2	Shari Bossuyt (BEL)	Canyon//SRAM	+ 2' 00"
3	Femke Gerritse (NED)	Parkhotel Valkenburg	+ 2' 08"
4	Blanka Vas (HUN)	SD Worx	+ 2' 14"
5	Mischa Bredewold (NED)	Parkhotel Valkenburg	+ 2' 26"
6	Federica Damiana Piergiovanni (ITA)	Valcar–Travel & Service	+ 2' 37"
7	Julia Borgström (SWE)	AG Insurance–NXTG	+ 3' 00"
8	Sarah Gigante (AUS)	Movistar Team	+ 3' 35"
9	Mari Hole Mohr (NOR)	Team Coop–Hitec Products	+ 4' 02"
10	Marta Jaskulska (POL)	Liv Racing Xstra	+ 4' 07"

=== Team classification ===
Final team classification (1–10)
Rank	Team	Time
1	Team DSM	62h 33' 32"
2	Team BikeExchange–Jayco	+ 3' 41"
3	Plantur–Pura	+ 4' 09"
4	UAE Team ADQ	+ 4' 57"
5	FDJ Nouvelle-Aquitaine Futuroscope	+ 5' 37"
6	Team Coop–Hitec Products	+ 6' 09"
7	Liv Racing Xstra	+ 7' 05"
8	Valcar–Travel & Service	+ 8' 18"
9	Le Col–Wahoo	+ 11' 05"
10	Valcar–Travel & Service	+ 11' 06"
