= 2024 Women's Tour Down Under =

2024 UCI Women's World Tour, race 1 of 27
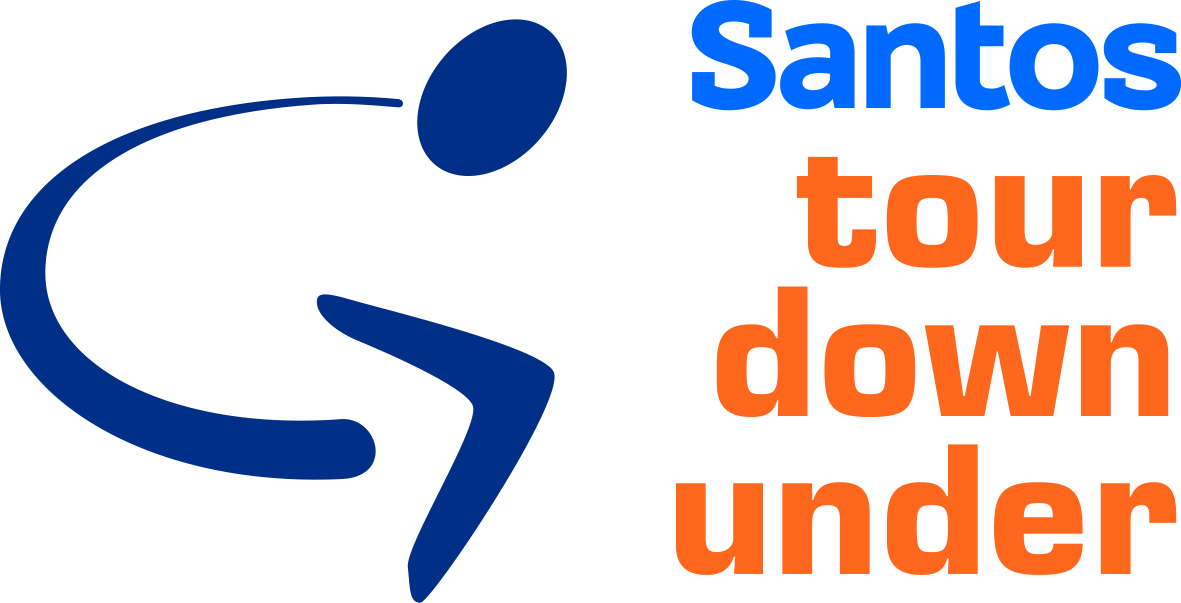

Race details
- Dates: 12–14 January 2024
- Stages: 3
- Distance: 291.5 km (181.1 mi)
- Winning time: 7h 57' 33"

Results
Jersey awarded to the overall winner	Winner	Sarah Gigante (AUS)	(AG Insurance–Soudal)
	Second	Nienke Vinke (NED)	(Team dsm–firmenich PostNL)
	Third	Neve Bradbury (AUS)	(Canyon//SRAM)
Jersey awarded to the mountains classification winner	Mountains	Katia Ragusa (ITA)	(Human Powered Health)
Jersey awarded to the young rider classification winner	Young rider	Nienke Vinke (NED)	(AG Insurance–Soudal)
Jersey awarded to the sprints classification winner	Sprints	Sofia Bertizzolo (ITA)	(UAE Team ADQ)
	Team	(Netherlands) Team dsm–firmenich PostNL	

The 2024 Santos Women's Tour Down Under was a women's cycle stage race held in and around Adelaide, South Australia from 12 to 14 January. It was the seventh edition of Women's Tour Down Under. The race was the first event of the 2024 UCI Women's World Tour, the second year it was a part of the World Tour.

The race was won by Australian rider Sarah Gigante of AG Insurance–Soudal.

== Teams ==
Sixteen teams took part in the event, including nine UCI Women's WorldTeams, six Women's continental teams and one national team.

UCI Women's WorldTeams

- AG Insurance–Soudal
- Canyon//SRAM
- FDJ–Suez
- Human Powered Health
- Lidl–Trek
- Liv AlUla Jayco
- Team dsm–firmenich PostNL
- Visma–Lease a Bike
- UAE Team ADQ

UCI Women's Continental Teams

- ARA Skip Capital
- Lifeplus Wahoo
- St. Michel–Mavic–Auber93
- Team Bridgelane WE
- Team Coop–Repsol
- Tashkent City Women Professional Cycling Team

National Teams

- Australia

== Route ==
List of stages
Stage	Date	Course	Distance	Type	Winner
1	12 January	Hahndorf to Campbelltown	93.9 km (58.3 mi)	Hilly stage	Ally Wollaston (NZL)
2	13 January	Glenelg to Stirling	104.2 km (64.7 mi)	Hilly stage	Cecilie Uttrup Ludwig (DEN)
3	14 January	Adelaide to Willunga Hill	93.4 km (58.0 mi)	Hilly stage	Sarah Gigante (AUS)
Total			291.5 km (181.1 mi)		

== Stages ==
=== Stage 1 ===
12 January 2024 — Hahndorf to Campbelltown, 93.9 km (58.3 mi)

The stage featured two intermediate sprint points and two Queen of the Mountains (QOM) points also.

Ahead of the first stage, a minute's silence was held to honour Melissa Hoskins who had recently passed away. The first intermediate sprint was 12 km into the race. Ruby Roseman-Gannon (Liv AlUla Jayco) out-sprinted teammate Georgia Baker to take the points and bonus seconds. Then a breakaway of four riders went up the road: Matilda Raynolds (Team Bridgelane), Katia Ragusa (Human Powered Health), India Grangier (Team Coop–Repsol) and Kate Richardson (Lifeplus Wahoo). The four worked together with Ragusa winning both QOM sprints to win the jersey for next stage. The peloton caught the break with 9 km to go and set up for the sprint. The Liv AlUla Jayco team led the bunch through the final kilometres trying to set Baker up to win. Roseman-Gannon led Baker into the final 300 metres when Ally Wollaston jumped out from behind Baker to win the stage.

Result of Stage 1
Rank	Rider	Team	Time
1	Ally Wollaston (NZL)	AG Insurance–Soudal	2h 32' 37"
2	Georgia Baker (AUS)	Liv AlUla Jayco	+ 0"
3	Sofia Bertizzolo (ITA)	UAE Team ADQ	+ 0"
4	Kristýna Burlová (CZE)	Lifeplus Wahoo	+ 0"
5	Gladys Verhulst (FRA)	FDJ–Suez	+ 0"
6	Francesca Barale (ITA)	Team dsm–firmenich PostNL	+ 0"
7	Roxane Fournier (FRA)	St. Michel–Mavic–Auber93	+ 0"
8	Cecilie Uttrup Ludwig (DEN)	FDJ–Suez	+ 0"
9	Soraya Paladin (ITA)	Canyon//SRAM	+ 0"
10	Amanda Spratt (AUS)	Lidl–Trek	+ 0"

General classification after Stage 1
Rank	Rider	Team	Time
1	Ally Wollaston (NZL)	AG Insurance–Soudal	2h 32' 27"
2	Georgia Baker (AUS)	Liv AlUla Jayco	+ 2"
3	Sofia Bertizzolo (ITA)	UAE Team ADQ	+ 6"
4	Ruby Roseman-Gannon (AUS)	Liv AlUla Jayco	+ 7"
5	Katia Ragusa (ITA)	Human Powered Health	+ 7"
6	India Grangier (FRA)	Team Coop–Repsol	+ 8"
7	Dominika Włodarczyk (POL)	UAE Team ADQ	+ 9"
8	Matilda Raynolds (AUS)	Bridgelane WE	+ 9"
9	Kristýna Burlová (CZE)	Lifeplus Wahoo	+ 10"
10	Gladys Verhulst (FRA)	FDJ–Suez	+ 10"

=== Stage 2 ===
13 January 2024 — Glenelg to Stirling, 104.2 km (64.7 mi)

The stage featured two intermediate sprint points and two QOM points also.

Result of Stage 2
Rank	Rider	Team	Time
1	Cecilie Uttrup Ludwig (DEN)	FDJ–Suez	2h 54' 28"
2	Soraya Paladin (ITA)	Canyon//SRAM	+ 0"
3	Sofia Bertizzolo (ITA)	UAE Team ADQ	+ 0"
4	Francesca Barale (ITA)	Team dsm–firmenich PostNL	+ 0"
5	Heidi Franz (USA)	Lifeplus Wahoo	+ 0"
6	Alexandra Manly (AUS)	Liv AlUla Jayco	+ 0"
7	Amanda Spratt (AUS)	Lidl–Trek	+ 0"
8	Ruth Edwards (USA)	Human Powered Health	+ 0"
9	Sarah Gigante (AUS)	AG Insurance–Soudal	+ 0"
10	Ruby Roseman-Gannon (AUS)	Liv AlUla Jayco	+ 0"

General classification after Stage 2
Rank	Rider	Team	Time
1	Cecilie Uttrup Ludwig (DEN)	FDJ–Suez	5h 26' 55"
2	Sofia Bertizzolo (ITA)	UAE Team ADQ	+ 2"
3	Ruby Roseman-Gannon (AUS)	Liv AlUla Jayco	+ 3"
4	Dominika Włodarczyk (POL)	UAE Team ADQ	+ 3"
5	Soraya Paladin (ITA)	Canyon//SRAM	+ 4"
6	India Grangier (FRA)	Team Coop–Repsol	+ 8"
7	Francesca Barale (ITA)	Team dsm–firmenich PostNL	+ 10"
8	Amanda Spratt (AUS)	Lidl–Trek	+ 10"
9	Lieke Nooijnen (NED)	Visma–Lease a Bike	+ 10"
10	Nienke Vinke (NED)	Team dsm–firmenich PostNL	+ 10"

=== Stage 3 ===
14 January 2024 — Adelaide to Willunga Hill, 93.4 km (58.0 mi)

The stage featured two intermediate sprint points and two category 1 climbs where QOM points were on offer.

Result of Stage 3
Rank	Rider	Team	Time
1	Sarah Gigante (AUS)	AG Insurance–Soudal	2h 30' 38"
2	Nienke Vinke (NED)	Team dsm–firmenich PostNL	+ 16"
3	Neve Bradbury (AUS)	Canyon//SRAM	+ 27"
4	Amanda Spratt (AUS)	Lidl–Trek	+ 27"
5	Dominika Włodarczyk (POL)	UAE Team ADQ	+ 46"
6	Victorie Guilman (FRA)	St. Michel–Mavic–Auber93	+ 47"
7	Ella Wyllie (AUS)	Liv AlUla Jayco	+ 47"
8	Maud Oudeman (NED)	Visma–Lease a Bike	+ 47"
9	Rosita Reijnhout (NED)	Visma–Lease a Bike	+ 47"
10	Julie Van de Velde (BEL)	AG Insurance–Soudal	+ 47"

General classification after Stage 3
Rank	Rider	Team	Time
1	Sarah Gigante (AUS)	AG Insurance–Soudal	7h 57' 33"
2	Nienke Vinke (NED)	Team dsm–firmenich PostNL	+ 20"
3	Neve Bradbury (AUS)	Canyon//SRAM	+ 33"
4	Amanda Spratt (AUS)	Lidl–Trek	+ 37"
5	Dominika Włodarczyk (POL)	UAE Team ADQ	+ 44"
6	Victorie Guilman (FRA)	St. Michel–Mavic–Auber93	+ 57"
7	Ella Wyllie (AUS)	Liv AlUla Jayco	+ 57"
8	Julie Van de Velde (BEL)	AG Insurance–Soudal	+ 57"
9	Cecilie Uttrup Ludwig (DEN)	FDJ–Suez	+ 1' 02"
10	Nicole Frain (AUS)	Australia	+ 1' 02"

== Classification leadership table ==
Stage	Winner	General classification	Mountains classification	Sprint classification	Young rider classification	Team classification
1	Ally Wollaston	Ally Wollaston	Katia Ragusa	Ally Wollaston	Kristýna Burlová	Lifeplus Wahoo
2	Cecilie Uttrup Ludwig	Cecilie Uttrup Ludwig	Katia Ragusa	Sofia Bertizzolo	Francesca Barale	UAE Team ADQ
3	Sarah Gigante	Sarah Gigante	Katia Ragusa	Sofia Bertizzolo	Nienke Vinke	Team dsm–firmenich PostNL
Final		Sarah Gigante	Katia Ragusa	Sofia Bertizzolo	Nienke Vinke	Team dsm–firmenich PostNL

== Classification standings ==
Legend
Denotes the winner of the general classification	Denotes the winner of the mountains classification
Denotes the winner of the sprints classification	Denotes the winner of the young rider classification

=== General classification ===
Final general classification (1–10)
Rank	Rider	Team	Time
1	Sarah Gigante (AUS)	AG Insurance–Soudal	7h 57' 33"
2	Nienke Vinke (NED)	Team dsm–firmenich PostNL	+ 20"
3	Neve Bradbury (AUS)	Canyon//SRAM	+ 33"
4	Amanda Spratt (AUS)	Lidl–Trek	+ 37"
5	Dominika Włodarczyk (POL)	UAE Team ADQ	+ 45"
6	Victorie Guilman (FRA)	St. Michel–Mavic–Auber93	+ 57"
7	Ella Wyllie (NZL)	Liv AlUla Jayco	+ 57"
8	Julie Van de Velde (BEL)	AG Insurance–Soudal	+ 57"
9	Cecilie Uttrup Ludwig (DEN)	FDJ–Suez	+ 1' 02"
10	Nicole Frain (AUS)	Australia	+ 1' 02"

=== Sprints classification ===
Final sprints classification (1–10)
Rank	Rider	Team	Points
1	Sofia Bertizzolo (ITA)	UAE Team ADQ	44
2	Cecilie Uttrup Ludwig (DEN)	FDJ–Suez	43
3	Francesca Barale (ITA)	Team dsm–firmenich PostNL	37
4	Soraya Paladin (ITA)	Canyon//SRAM	34
5	Amanda Spratt (AUS)	Lidl–Trek	33
6	Ally Wollaston (NZL)	AG Insurance–Soudal	30
7	Sarah Gigante (AUS)	AG Insurance–Soudal	29
8	Georgia Baker (AUS)	Liv AlUla Jayco	29
9	Dominika Włodarczyk (POL)	UAE Team ADQ	26
10	Ruby Roseman-Gannon (AUS)	Liv AlUla Jayco	22

=== Mountains classification ===
Final mountains classification (1–10)
Rank	Rider	Team	Points
1	Katia Ragusa (ITA)	Human Powered Health	37
2	Cecilie Uttrup Ludwig (DEN)	FDJ–Suez	12
3	Sarah Gigante (AUS)	AG Insurance–Soudal	10
4	Nienke Vinke (NED)	Team dsm–firmenich PostNL	6
5	India Grangier (FRA)	Team Coop–Repsol	6
6	Sophie Edwards (AUS)	ARA Skip Capital	6
7	Lily Williams (USA)	Human Powered Health	6
8	Amanda Spratt (AUS)	Lidl–Trek	4
9	Ruth Edwards (USA)	Human Powered Health	4
10	Matilda Raynolds (AUS)	Team Bridgelane WE	4

=== Young rider classification ===
Final young rider classification (1–10)
Rank	Rider	Team	Time
1	Nienke Vinke (NED)	Team dsm–firmenich PostNL	7h 57' 53"
2	Neve Bradbury (AUS)	Canyon//SRAM	+ 13"
3	Ella Wyllie (NZL)	Liv AlUla Jayco	+ 37"
4	Francesca Barale (ITA)	Team dsm–firmenich PostNL	+ 45"
5	Maud Oudeman (NED)	Visma–Lease a Bike	+ 47"
6	Rosita Reijnhout (NED)	Visma–Lease a Bike	+ 47"
7	Marion Bunel (FRA)	St. Michel–Mavic–Auber93	+ 55"
8	Ella Simpson (AUS)	ARA Skip Capital	+ 1' 04"
9	Alice Towers (GBR)	Canyon//SRAM	+ 1' 08"
10	Abi Smith (GBR)	Team dsm–firmenich PostNL	+ 1' 38"

=== Teams classification ===
Final team classification (1–10)
Rank	Team	Time
1	(Netherlands) Team dsm–firmenich PostNL	23h 56' 08"
2	(Germany) Canyon//SRAM	+ 4"
3	(Belgium) AG Insurance–Soudal	+ 36"
4	(Australia) Liv AlUla Jayco	+ 1' 08"
5	(United Arab Emirates) UAE Team ADQ	+ 1' 10"
6	Australia	+ 1' 28"
7	(Netherlands) Visma–Lease a Bike	+ 1' 31"
8	(United States) Lidl–Trek	+ 1' 52"
9	(France) FDJ–Suez	+ 3' 43"
10	(United States) Human Powered Health	+ 4' 05"
