= Stine Borgli =

Norwegian cyclist (born 1990)

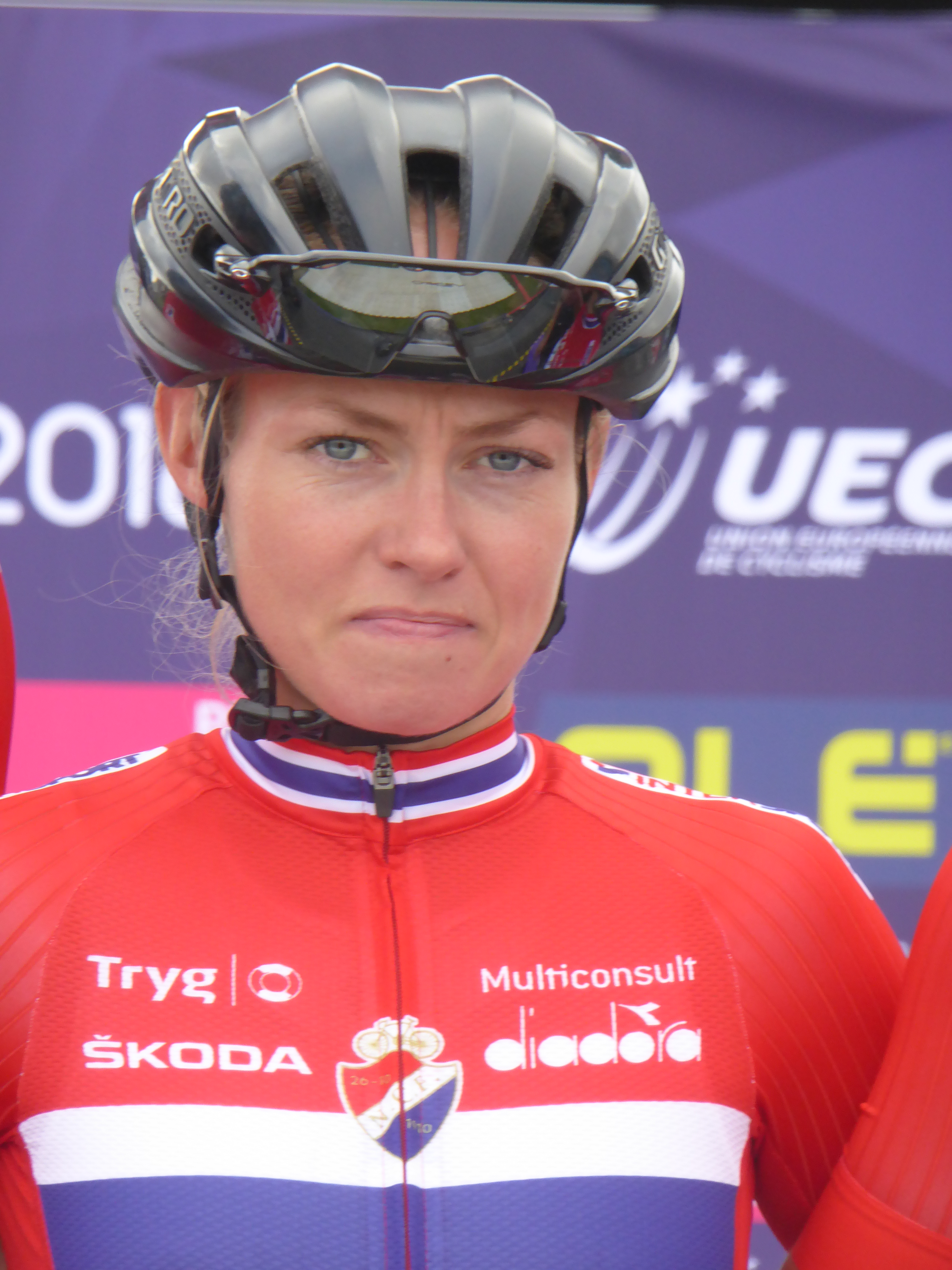
- Borgli at the 2018 European Road Cycling Championships.

Personal information
- Full name: Stine Andersen Borgli
- Born: 4 July 1990 (age 36) Sandnes, Norway

Cycling career
- Sport: Cycling
- Discipline: Road
- Role: Rider

Amateur teams
- 2016: Bryne CK
- 2018: Autoglas Wetteren
- 2019: Keukens Redant

Professional team
- 2019–2023: FDJ Nouvelle-Aquitaine Futuroscope

Stine Andersen Borgli (born 4 July 1990) is a Norwegian racing cyclist, who last rode for UCI Women's WorldTeam FDJ–Suez. She rode in the women's road race event at the 2018 UCI Road World Championships.

== Major results ==
2011
3rd Road race, National Road Championships
2015
5th Road race, National Road Championships
2018
3rd Road race, National Road Championships
2019
1st Overall Vuelta a Burgos Feminas
1st Mountains classification, Tour de Bretagne Féminin
1st Mountains classification, Tour de Belle Isle en Terre-Kreiz Breizh Elites Dames
3rd Overall Women's Tour of Scotland
4th Time trial, National Road Championships
5th Grand Prix de Plumelec-Morbihan Dames
6th GP de Plouay – Bretagne
10th Overall Grand Prix Elsy Jacobs
10th Overall Belgium Tour
2020
10th Overall Setmana Ciclista Valenciana
2021
10th Dwars door Vlaanderen
2022
3rd Overall Tour of Uppsala

1st Points classification

5th Road race, National Road Championships
