= Julie Van de Velde =

Belgian cyclist

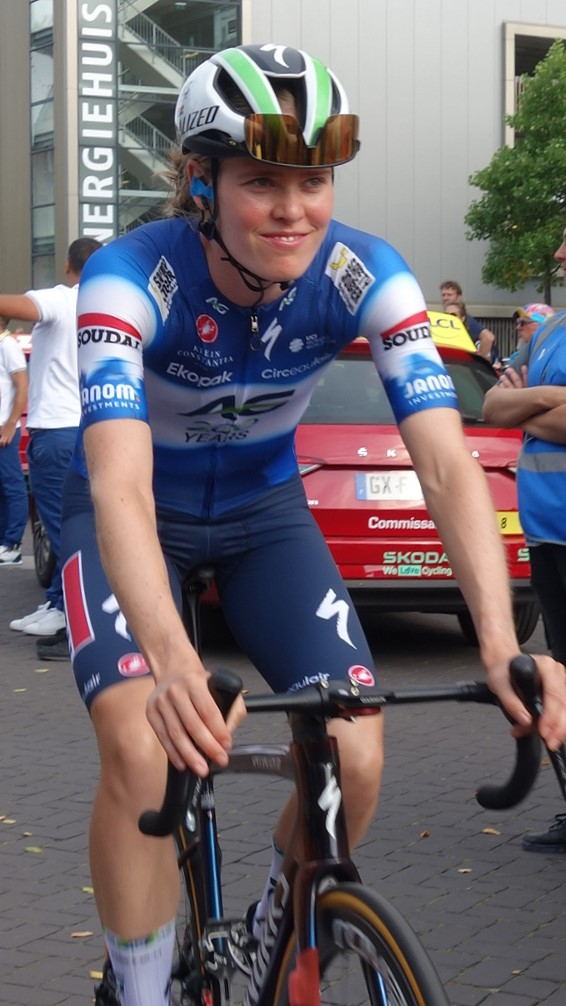
- Van de Velde in 2024

Personal information
- Full name: Julie Van de Velde
- Born: 2 June 1993 (age 33) Bruges, Belgium

Cycling career
- Sport: Cycling
- Current team: AG Insurance–Soudal
- Discipline: Road
- Role: Rider

Professional teams
- 2017–2020: Lotto–Soudal Ladies
- 2021: Team Jumbo–Visma
- 2022–2023: Plantur–Pura
- 2024–: AG Insurance–Soudal

Julie Van de Velde (born 2 June 1993) is a Belgian racing cyclist, who currently rides for UCI Women's WorldTeam AG Insurance–Soudal. From 2018 onwards, she was a regular member of the Belgium team at the UCI Road World Championships, participating in both the road race (5x) and the road time trial (3x). In 2019 she won the Flanders Ladies Classic and came second in the general classification at Gracia–Orlová. She participated in both the 2020 and 2024 Summer Olympics in Tokyo, Japan resp. Paris, France. She was on the Belgium teams that supported Lotte Kopecky to her two wins in the 2023 and 2024 UCI Road World Championships in Glasgow, Scotland resp. Zurich, Switzerland and to her bronze medal at the 2024 Summer Olympics in Paris, France.

== Major results ==
2017
3rd Time trial, National Road Championships
8th Chrono des Nations
2018
5th Time trial, National Road Championships
2019
1st Flanders Ladies Classic
2nd Overall Gracia–Orlová
National Road Championships

3rd Road race
5th Time trial

7th Overall Setmana Ciclista Valenciana
7th Grand Prix de Plumelec-Morbihan Dames
8th Overall Women's Tour of Scotland
2020
3rd Time trial, National Road Championships
2021
National Road Championships

2nd Road race
2nd Time trial

2022
5th Time trial, National Road Championships
6th Overall Tour of Scandinavia
8th Binche Chimay Binche pour Dames
9th Chrono des Nations
2023
Tour de France

Held after Stage 3
Combativity award Stage 3

2024
8th Overall Tour Down Under
Combativity award Stage 7 Tour de France
