= Ariadna Trias =

Spanish cyclist

Personal information
- Full name: Ariadna Trias Jordán
- Born: 27 April 1995 (age 31)

Cycling career
- Sport: Cycling
- Discipline: Road
- Role: Rider

Professional teams
- 2017–2019: Lointek
- 2020: Massi–Tactic

Ariadna Trias Jordán (born 27 April 1995) is a Spanish professional racing cyclist, who most recently rode for UCI Women's Continental Team Massi–Tactic. Her younger sister Mireia Trias is also a professional cyclist, riding with Massi–Tactic.
