= Henrietta Christie =

New Zealand cyclist (born 2002)

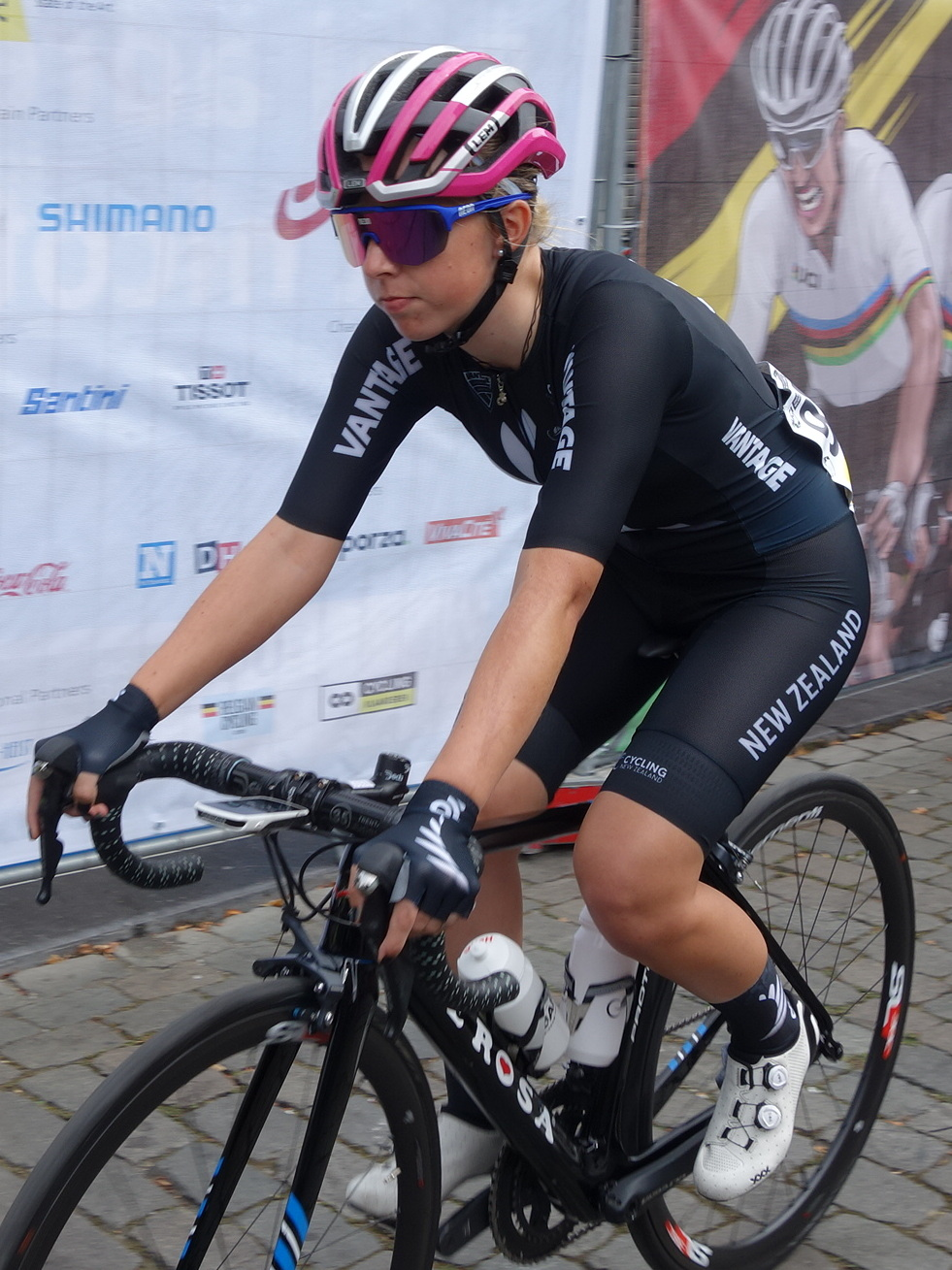
- Christie at the 2021 World Championships

Personal information
- Born: 23 January 2002 (age 24) Wellington, New Zealand

Cycling career
- Sport: Cycling
- Current team: EF Education–Oatly
- Discipline: Road
- Role: Rider

Professional teams
- 2021: Bepink
- 2022–2024: Human Powered Health
- 2025–: EF Education–Oatly

Henrietta Christie (born 23 January 2002) is a New Zealand professional racing cyclist, who currently rides for UCI Women's ProTeam EF Education–Oatly. In September 2021, Christie won the young rider classification at the 2021 Tour Cycliste Féminin International de l'Ardèche in France.

== Major results ==
2019
Oceania Junior Road Championships

3rd Time trial
6th Road race

3rd National Junior Road Championships Time trial
2020
National Junior Road Championships

1st Time trial
2nd Road race

2021
National Under-23 Road Championships

1st Time trial
2nd Road race

1st Young rider classification Tour Cycliste Féminin International de l'Ardèche
7th Gravel and Tar La Femme
2022
National Under-23 Road Championships

2nd Road race
3rd Time trial
