= Clara Koppenburg =

German cyclist (born 1995)

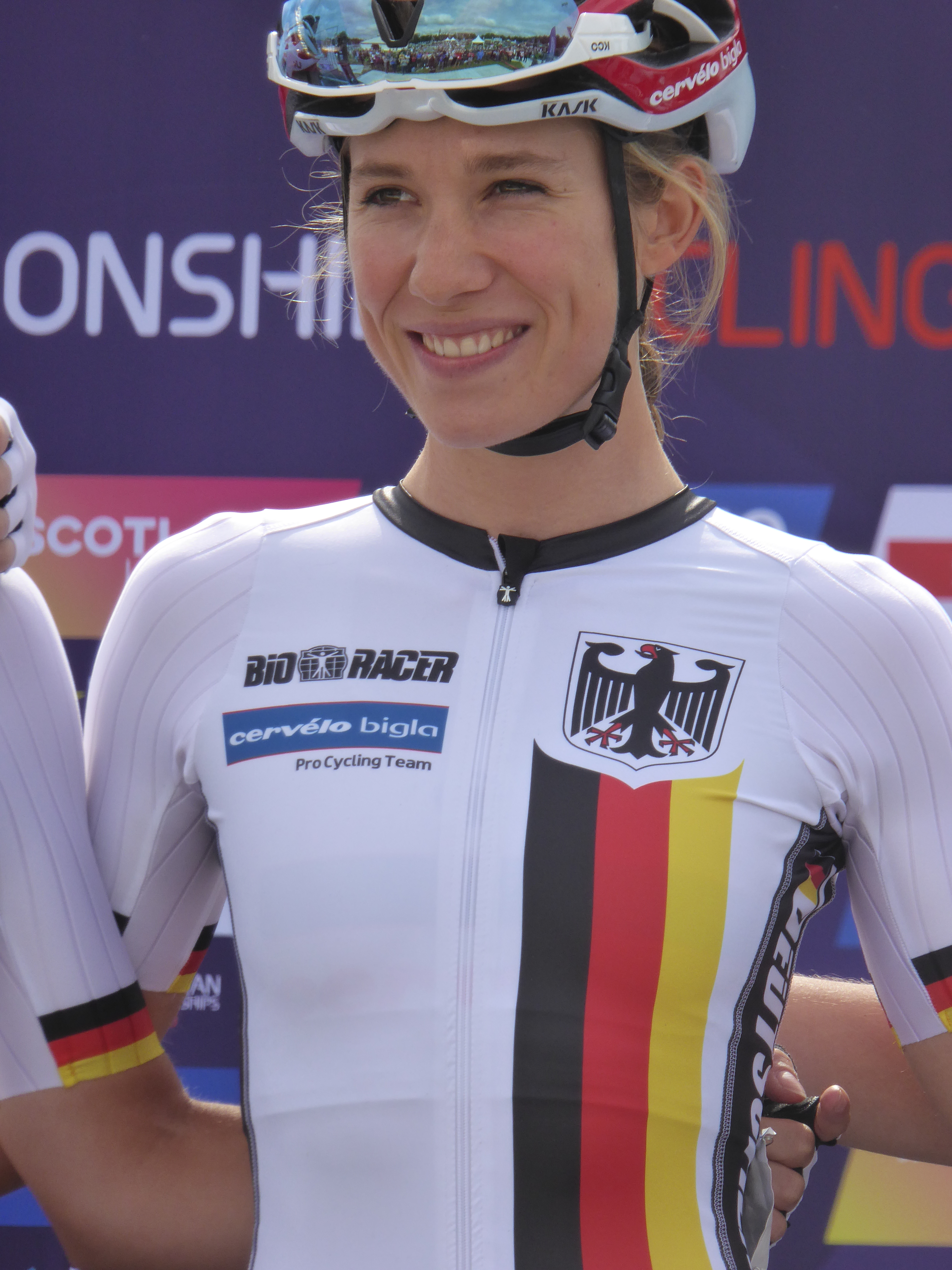
- Koppenburg at the 2018 European Road Cycling Championships.

Personal information
- Full name: Clara Koppenburg
- Born: 3 August 1995 (age 31) Lörrach, Germany

Cycling career
- Sport: Cycling
- Current team: EF Education–Oatly
- Discipline: Road
- Role: Rider
- Rider type: All-rounder

Amateur team
- 2014: RSV Seerose Friedrichshafen

Professional teams
- 2015–2018: Bigla Pro Cycling Team
- 2019: WNT–Rotor Pro Cycling
- 2020: Bigla–Katusha
- 2021: Rally Cycling
- 2022–2023: Cofidis
- 2024–: EF Education–Cannondale

Clara Koppenburg (born 3 August 1995) is a German professional racing cyclist, who rides for UCI Women's Continental Team EF Education–Oatly.

== Major results ==
2017
2nd Crescent Vårgårda TTT
3rd Team time trial, UCI Road World Championships
4th Time trial, UEC European Under-23 Road Championships
8th Overall Gracia–Orlová

1st Young rider classification

2018
3rd Crescent Vårgårda TTT
3rd Team time trial, Ladies Tour of Norway
4th Ljubljana–Domžale–Ljubljana TT
9th Overall Emakumeen Euskal Bira
2019
1st Overall Setmana Ciclista Valenciana

1st Stage 3

2nd Overall Tour Cycliste Féminin International de l'Ardèche
4th Overall Tour of California
5th Overall Giro della Toscana Int. Femminile – Memorial Michela Fanini
7th Overall Tour de Bretagne Féminin
8th Time trial, European Games
2020
2nd Overall Setmana Ciclista Valenciana
4th Durango-Durango Emakumeen Saria
6th Emakumeen Nafarroako Klasikoa
2021
4th Overall Vuelta a Burgos Feminas
2022
2nd Mont Ventoux Dénivelé Challenge

== See also ==
- List of 2015 UCI Women's Teams and riders
