= 2020 Setmana Ciclista Valenciana =

Race details
- Dates: 20–23 February 2020
- Stages: 4

Results
Jersey awarded to the overall winner	Winner	Anna van der Breggen (NED)	(Boels–Dolmans)
	Second	Clara Koppenburg (GER)	(Bigla–Katusha)
	Third	Demi Vollering (NED)	(Parkhotel Valkenburg)
Jersey awarded to the mountains classification winner	Mountains	Ane Santesteban (ESP)	(Ceratizit–WNT Pro Cycling)
Jersey awarded to the youth classification winner	Youth	Greta Marturano (ITA)	(Top Girls Fassa Bortolo)

The 2020 Setmana Ciclista Valenciana was a women's cycle stage race held in Spain from 20 to 23 February, 2020. The Setmana Ciclista Valenciana, being held for the fourth time, was held as a UCI rating of 2.2 race.

== Route ==
List of stages
Stage	Date	Course	Distance	Type	Winner	Team
1	20 February	Gandia to Cullera	103 km (64.0 mi)	Flat stage	Emma Cecilie Norsgaard (DEN)	Bigla–Katusha
2	21 February	Agost to Finestrat	126 km (78.3 mi)	Hilly stage	Anna van der Breggen (NED)	Boels–Dolmans
3	22 February	Valencia to Port de Sagunt	94 km (58.4 mi)	Hilly stage	Lizbeth Yareli Salazar (MEX)	Astana
4	23 February	Betxí to Vila-real	140 km (87.0 mi)	Hilly stage	Leah Thomas (USA)	Bigla–Katusha

== Classification leadership table ==
Stage	Winner	General classification	Mountains classification	Young rider classification	Valencian classification
1	Emma Cecilie Norsgaard	Emma Cecilie Norsgaard	Katia Ragusa	Laura Tomasi	Cristina Martínez
2	Anna van der Breggen	Anna van der Breggen	Ane Santesteban	Greta Marturano	Cristina Martínez
3	Lizbeth Yareli Salazar	Anna van der Breggen	Ane Santesteban	Greta Marturano	Cristina Martínez
4	Leah Thomas	Anna van der Breggen	Ane Santesteban	Greta Marturano	Cristina Martínez
Final		Anna van der Breggen	Ane Santesteban	Greta Marturano	Cristina Martínez
