= Ayesha McGowan =

American cyclist (born 1987)

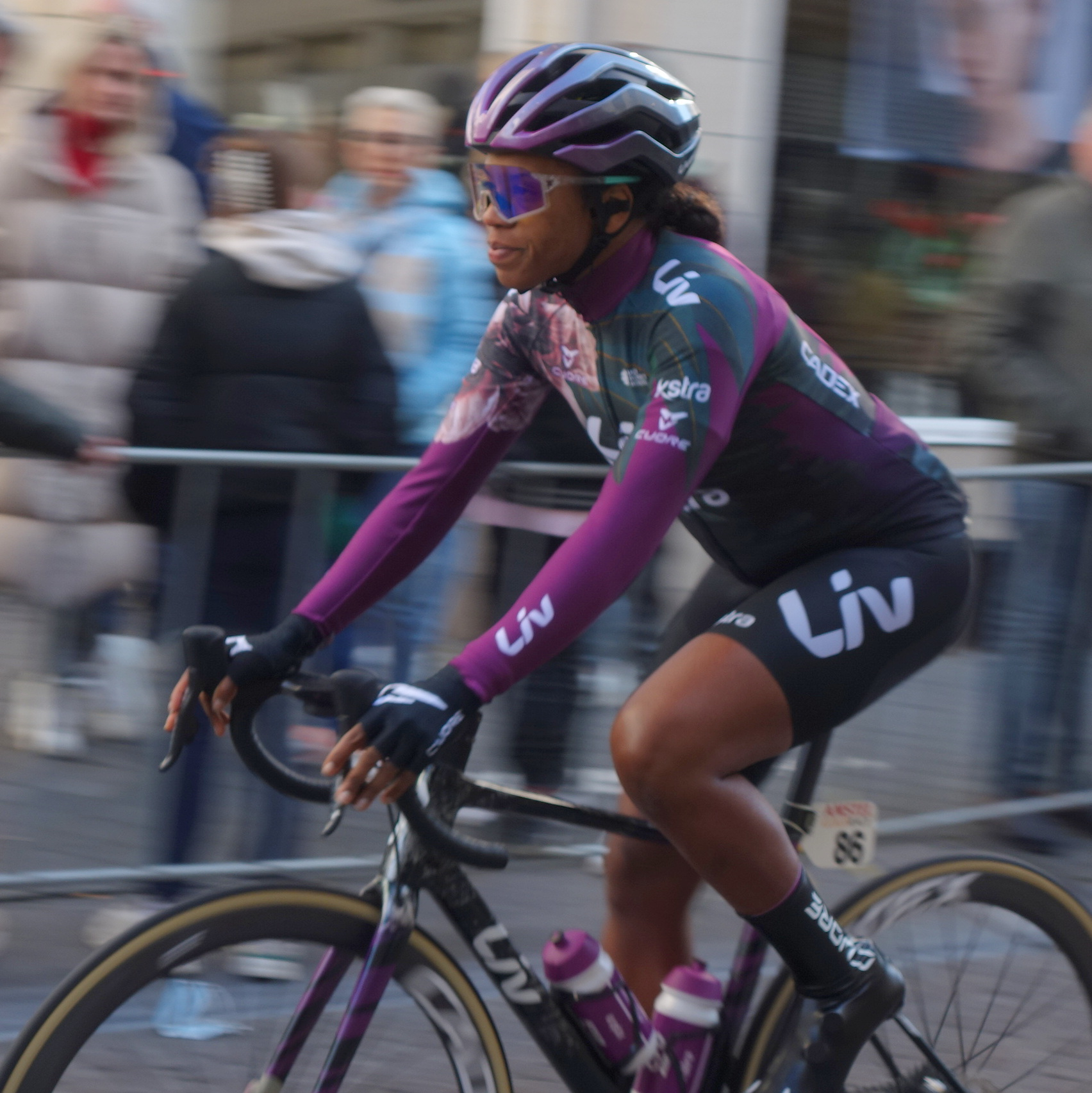

Personal information
- Full name: Ayesha Rosena Anna McGowan
- Born: April 2, 1987 (age 39) Atlanta, Georgia

Cycling career
- Sport: Cycling
- Discipline: Road
- Role: Rider
- Rider type: Puncheur

Amateur teams
- Apr 2019: Amy D Foundation
- Aug 2019: Alp Cycles
- 2020: Liv Racing

Professional teams
- 2021: Liv Racing (trainee)
- 2022–2023: Liv Racing Xstra

Ayesha Rosena Anna McGowan (born April 2, 1987) is an American professional racing cyclist who rode for UCI Women's World Team Liv Racing TeqFind. She is also an activist and advocate aiming to improve diversity and inclusivity in cycling, especially for women and ethnic minorities. She is the first African American woman on a professional road cycling team.

== Early life and amateur career ==
Unlike many professional cyclists who begin racing competitively at a young age, McGowan only started cycling as a commuter student at the Berklee College of Music in Boston. After graduation in 2010, she moved to Brooklyn, where she worked as a daycare teacher and taught private music lessons for five years.

After seven years of commuting, McGowan made her racing debut at the 2014 Red Hook Crit in Brooklyn, the first edition to feature separate men's and women's races. Later that same year, she took her maiden victory in the Category 4 race at the New York State Criterium Championships in White Plains.

== Professional career ==
In 2019, McGowan made her UCI professional-level racing debut when she competed in the Joe Martin Stage Race and in the Colorado Classic. On the third stage of the Colorado Classic, her attacking efforts garnered her significant attention and won her the Most Inspirational jersey for that stage.

Though McGowan had been a member of CCC - Liv for the 2020 season while racing domestically, she made the step up to the professional UCI Women's Team in 2021 as a satellite/trainee rider. This allowed her to make her racing debut with the team after August 1, as per UCI regulations. This debut came in early September, when McGowan was selected for the Tour Cycliste Féminin International de l'Ardèche. McGowan featured in the winning breakaway on stage 6, placing seventh, before eventually finishing 50th overall.

For the 2022 season, the renamed Liv Racing Xstra retained McGowan, who signed as a full-fledged professional.
