= 2019 Women's Tour of Scotland =

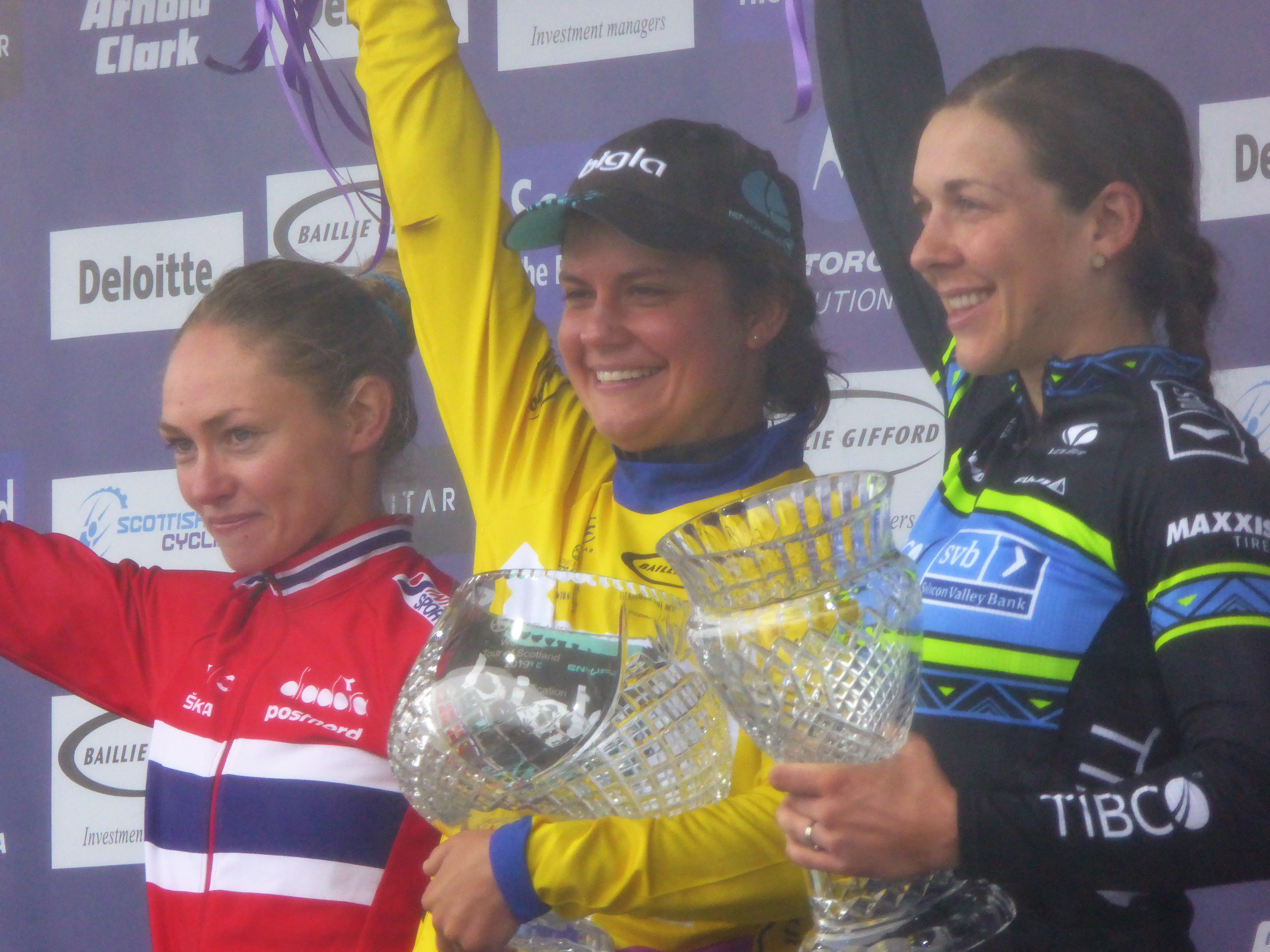
- The final podium (from left to right): Stine Borgli (third), Leah Thomas (first) and Alison Jackson (second)

Race details
- Dates: 9–11 August 2019
- Stages: 2 (Note: Race shortened from 3 stages and 359.2 kilometres (223.2 miles) due to the abandonment of stage 1 after 62 kilometres (39 miles) had been covered.)
- Distance: 256.1 km (159.1 mi)
- Winning time: 6h 34' 24"

Results
Jersey awarded to the overall winner	Winner	Leah Thomas (USA)	(Bigla Pro Cycling)
	Second	Alison Jackson (CAN)	(Tibco–Silicon Valley Bank)
	Third	Stine Borgli (NOR)	(Norway (national team))
Jersey awarded to the points classification winner	Points	Leah Thomas (USA)	(Bigla Pro Cycling)
Jersey awarded to the mountains classification winner	Mountains	Cecilie Uttrup Ludwig (DEN)	(Bigla Pro Cycling)
Jersey awarded to the youth classification winner	Youth	Nikola Nosková (CZE)	(Bigla Pro Cycling)

The 2019 Women's Tour of Scotland was the inaugural and only edition of the Women's Tour of Scotland, a women's cycling stage race held in Scotland, UK. It was run from 9 to 11 August 2019. The race was scheduled for 3 stages, covering a total of 359.2 kilometres (223.2 miles), but the race's opening stage was abandoned due to adverse weather conditions. It was classified as a class 2.1 event by the Union Cycliste Internationale (UCI).

The race was won by American rider Leah Thomas, riding for the Bigla Pro Cycling team. Having finished fourth in the second stage in Perth – won by Canada's Alison Jackson (Tibco–Silicon Valley Bank) – Thomas won the final stage in an eight-rider sprint at Holyrood Park in Edinburgh, and with bonus seconds accumulated at intermediate sprints during the day, Thomas assumed the leader's jersey from Jackson by five seconds. The podium was completed by Norwegian rider Stine Borgli, riding for a Norwegian national team, a further two seconds back, after two third-place stage finishes.

The Bigla Pro Cycling team won the other three jerseys that were on offer during the race. Thomas was the winner of the points classification alongside her general classification victory, while the team's leader Cecilie Uttrup Ludwig led the mountains classification from start-to-finish, and Nikola Nosková was the winner of the young rider classification, after a ninth-place finish on the final stage allowed her to take the jersey from Rally UHC Cycling's Emma White. The best Scottish rider during the race was Scottish junior national road race champion Anna Shackley, who finished in thirteenth place overall.

== History ==
The first and only edition was held in 2019 as a 2.1 category race on the UCI women's road cycling calendar. The event folded when the organizers, Zeus Sports, ceased trading having failed to pay debts following the 2019 event.

== Jerseys ==
Classification	2019
General classification	
Sprints classification	
Mountains classification	
Young rider classification	
Best Scottish rider	(Scotland)

== Teams ==
Sixteen teams participated in the race.

Professional women's teams

- Alé–Cipollini
- Bigla Pro Cycling
- BTC City Ljubljana
- Drops
- Lotto–Soudal Ladies
- Parkhotel Valkenburg
- Rally UHC Cycling
- Tibco–Silicon Valley Bank
- Valcar–Cylance

National teams

- Great Britain
- Norway
- Scotland
- South Korea

Non-UCI teams

- Brother UK–Tifosi p/b OnForm
- Team Jadan Weldtite–Vive Le Velo
- Torelli–Assure–Madison

== Route ==
Stage characteristics and winners
Stage	Date	Course	Distance	Type	Winner
1	9 August	Dundee to Dunfermline	103.1 km (64 mi)	Hilly stage	No winner
2	10 August	Glasgow to Perth	138.7 km (86 mi)	Flat stage	Alison Jackson (CAN)
3	11 August	Edinburgh to Edinburgh	117.4 km (73 mi)	Hilly stage	Leah Thomas (USA)

== Stages ==
=== Stage 1 ===
9 August 2019 — Dundee to Dunfermline, 103.1 km (64 mi)

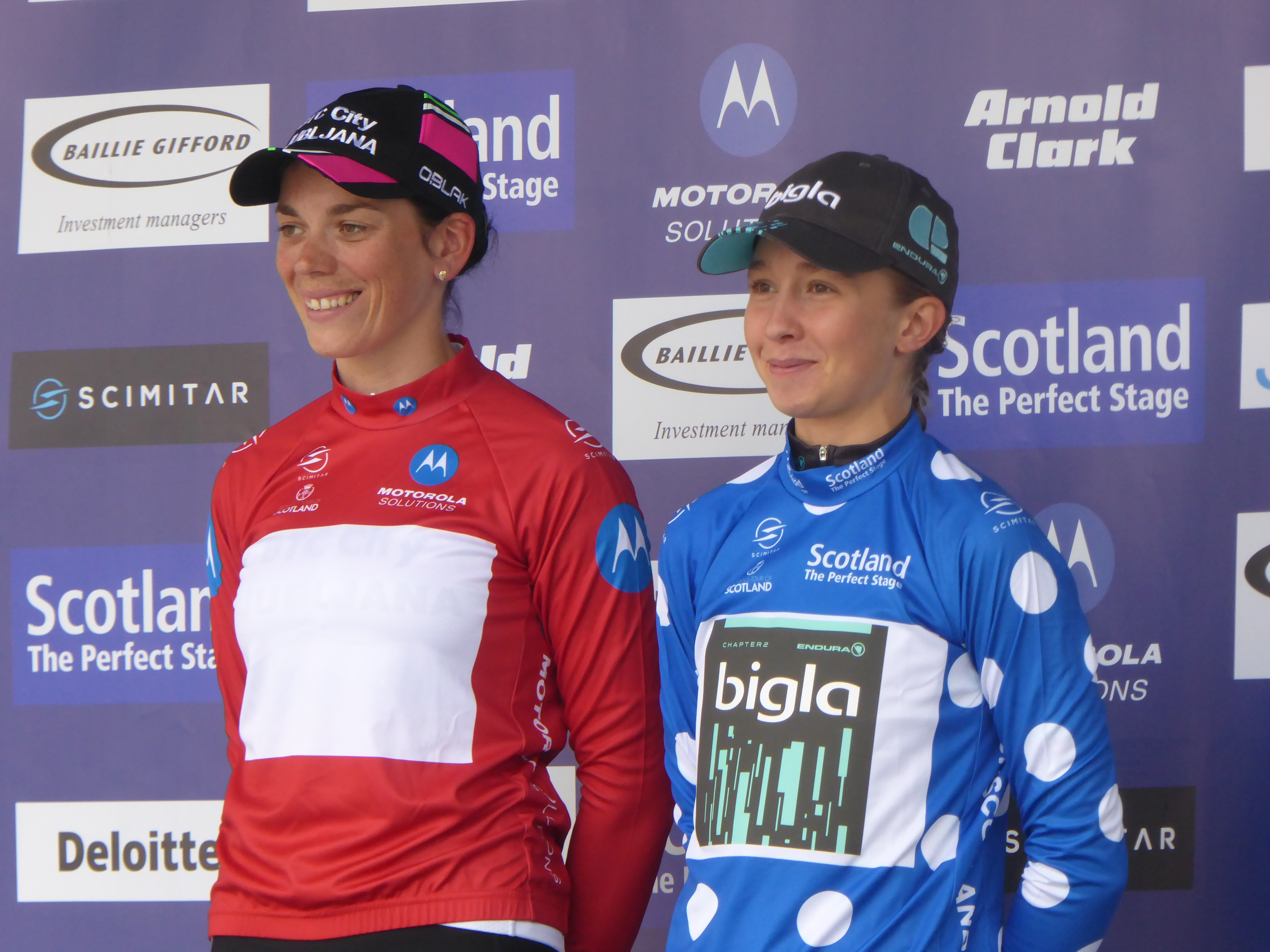
Eugenia Bujak (left; sprints) and Cecilie Uttrup Ludwig (right; mountains) were awarded their respective jerseys despite the abandonment of the stage

The opening stage of the race was abandoned after 62 kilometres (39 miles), due to adverse weather conditions. Prior to the abandonment, two intermediate sprints and one categorised climb were held and these points counted towards the respective classifications. The red sprinters' jersey went to BTC City Ljubljana's Eugenia Bujak on countback from Alé–Cipollini's Marjolein van't Geloof, while Bigla Pro Cycling rider Cecilie Uttrup Ludwig was first on the ascent at the Grange of Lindores to take the blue and white polka-dot jersey for the mountains classification.

=== Stage 2 ===
10 August 2019 — Glasgow to Perth, 138.7 km (86 mi)

Stage 2 result
Rank	Rider	Team	Time
1	Alison Jackson (CAN)	Tibco–Silicon Valley Bank	3h 24' 37"
2	Emma White (USA)	Rally UHC Cycling	+ 0"
3	Stine Borgli (NOR)	Norway (national team)	+ 0"
4	Leah Thomas (USA)	Bigla Pro Cycling	+ 0"
5	Belle de Gast (NED)	Parkhotel Valkenburg	+ 0"
6	Ilaria Sanguineti (ITA)	Valcar–Cylance	+ 0"
7	Jessica Roberts (GBR)	Great Britain (national team)	+ 0"
8	Abby-Mae Parkinson (GBR)	Drops	+ 0"
9	Niamh Fisher-Black (NZL)	Torelli–Assure–Madison	+ 0"
10	Eugenia Bujak (SLO)	BTC City Ljubljana	+ 0"

General classification after Stage 2
Rank	Rider	Team	Time
1	Alison Jackson (CAN)	Tibco–Silicon Valley Bank	3h 24' 27"
2	Emma White (USA)	Rally UHC Cycling	+ 4"
3	Stine Borgli (NOR)	Norway (national team)	+ 4"
4	Leah Thomas (USA)	Bigla Pro Cycling	+ 7"
5	Eugenia Bujak (SLO)	BTC City Ljubljana	+ 8"
6	Na Ah-reum (KOR)	Alé–Cipollini	+ 9"
7	Belle de Gast (NED)	Parkhotel Valkenburg	+ 10"
8	Ilaria Sanguineti (ITA)	Valcar–Cylance	+ 10"
9	Jessica Roberts (GBR)	Great Britain (national team)	+ 10"
10	Abby-Mae Parkinson (GBR)	Drops	+ 10"

=== Stage 3 ===
11 August 2019 — Edinburgh to Edinburgh, 117.4 km (73 mi)

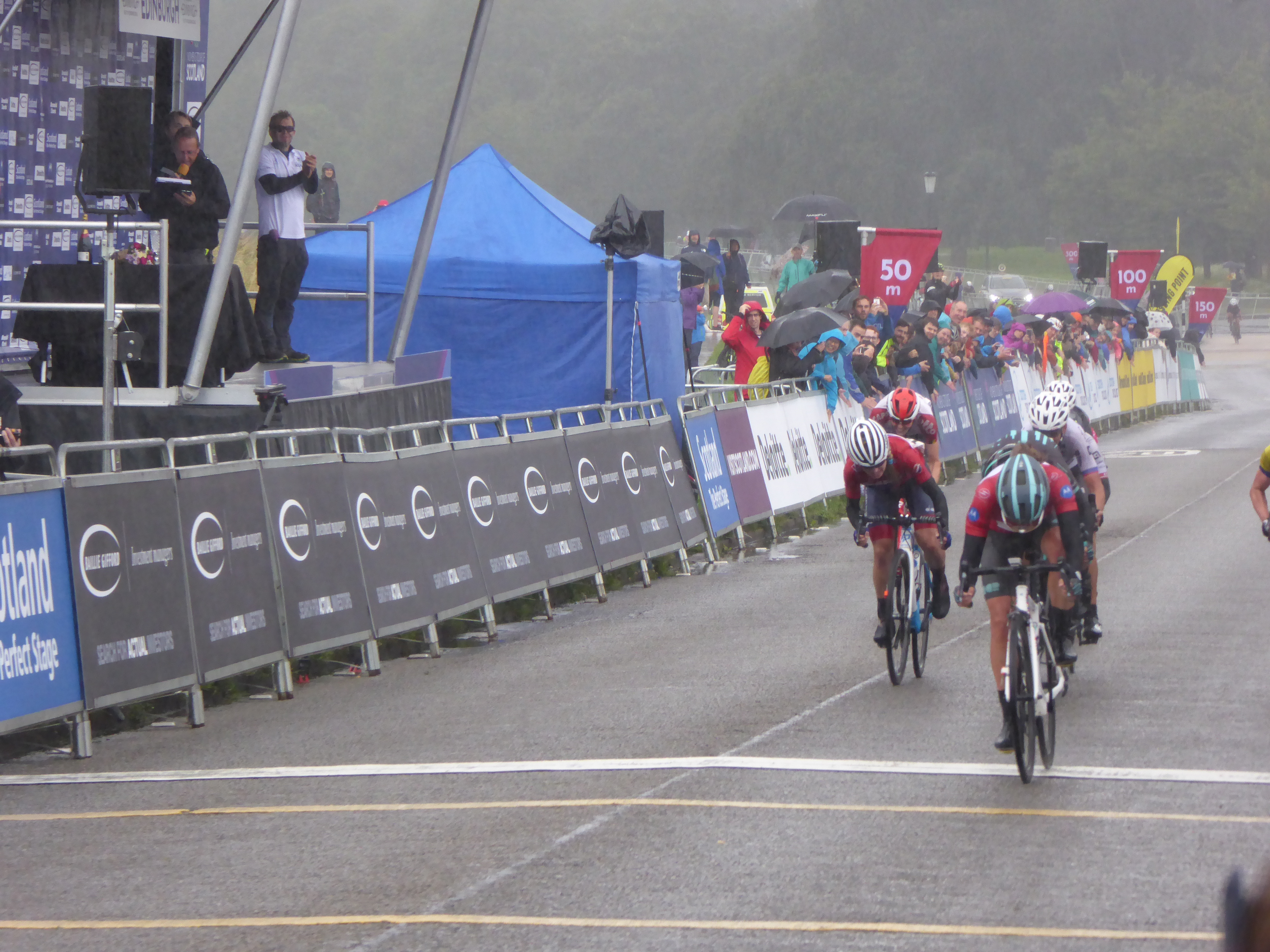
Leah Thomas won the sprint at the end of stage three, taking the general classification victory in the process

Stage 3 result
Rank	Rider	Team	Time
1	Leah Thomas (USA)	Bigla Pro Cycling	3h 10' 04"
2	Elise Chabbey (SUI)	Bigla Pro Cycling	+ 0"
3	Stine Borgli (NOR)	Norway (national team)	+ 0"
4	Alison Jackson (CAN)	Tibco–Silicon Valley Bank	+ 0"
5	Eugenia Bujak (SLO)	BTC City Ljubljana	+ 0"
6	Eri Yonamine (JPN)	Alé–Cipollini	+ 0"
7	Julie Van de Velde (BEL)	Lotto–Soudal Ladies	+ 0"
8	Hanna Nilsson (SWE)	BTC City Ljubljana	+ 0"
9	Nikola Nosková (CZE)	Bigla Pro Cycling	+ 3"
10	Nadia Quagliotto (ITA)	Alé–Cipollini	+ 6"

Final general classification
Rank	Rider	Team	Time
1	Leah Thomas (USA)	Bigla Pro Cycling	6h 34' 24"
2	Alison Jackson (CAN)	Tibco–Silicon Valley Bank	+ 5"
3	Stine Borgli (NOR)	Norway (national team)	+ 7"
4	Eugenia Bujak (SLO)	BTC City Ljubljana	+ 13"
5	Elise Chabbey (SUI)	Bigla Pro Cycling	+ 14"
6	Eri Yonamine (JPN)	Alé–Cipollini	+ 20"
7	Hanna Nilsson (SWE)	BTC City Ljubljana	+ 20"
8	Julie Van de Velde (BEL)	Lotto–Soudal Ladies	+ 20"
9	Nikola Nosková (CZE)	Bigla Pro Cycling	+ 23"
10	Emma White (USA)	Rally UHC Cycling	+ 26"

== Classification leadership table ==
Classification leadership by stage
Stage	Winner	General classification	Points classification	Mountains classification	Young rider classification	Best Scottish rider classification	Combativity award
1	No winner	Not awarded	Eugenia Bujak	Cecilie Uttrup Ludwig	Not awarded	Not awarded	Not awarded
2	Alison Jackson	Alison Jackson	Leah Thomas	Cecilie Uttrup Ludwig	Emma White	Jennifer George	Brodie Chapman
3	Leah Thomas	Leah Thomas	Leah Thomas	Cecilie Uttrup Ludwig	Nikola Nosková	Anna Shackley	Ann-Sophie Duyck
Final		Leah Thomas	Leah Thomas	Cecilie Uttrup Ludwig	Nikola Nosková	Anna Shackley	No final award
