= Leah Thomas (cyclist) =

American cyclist (born 1989)

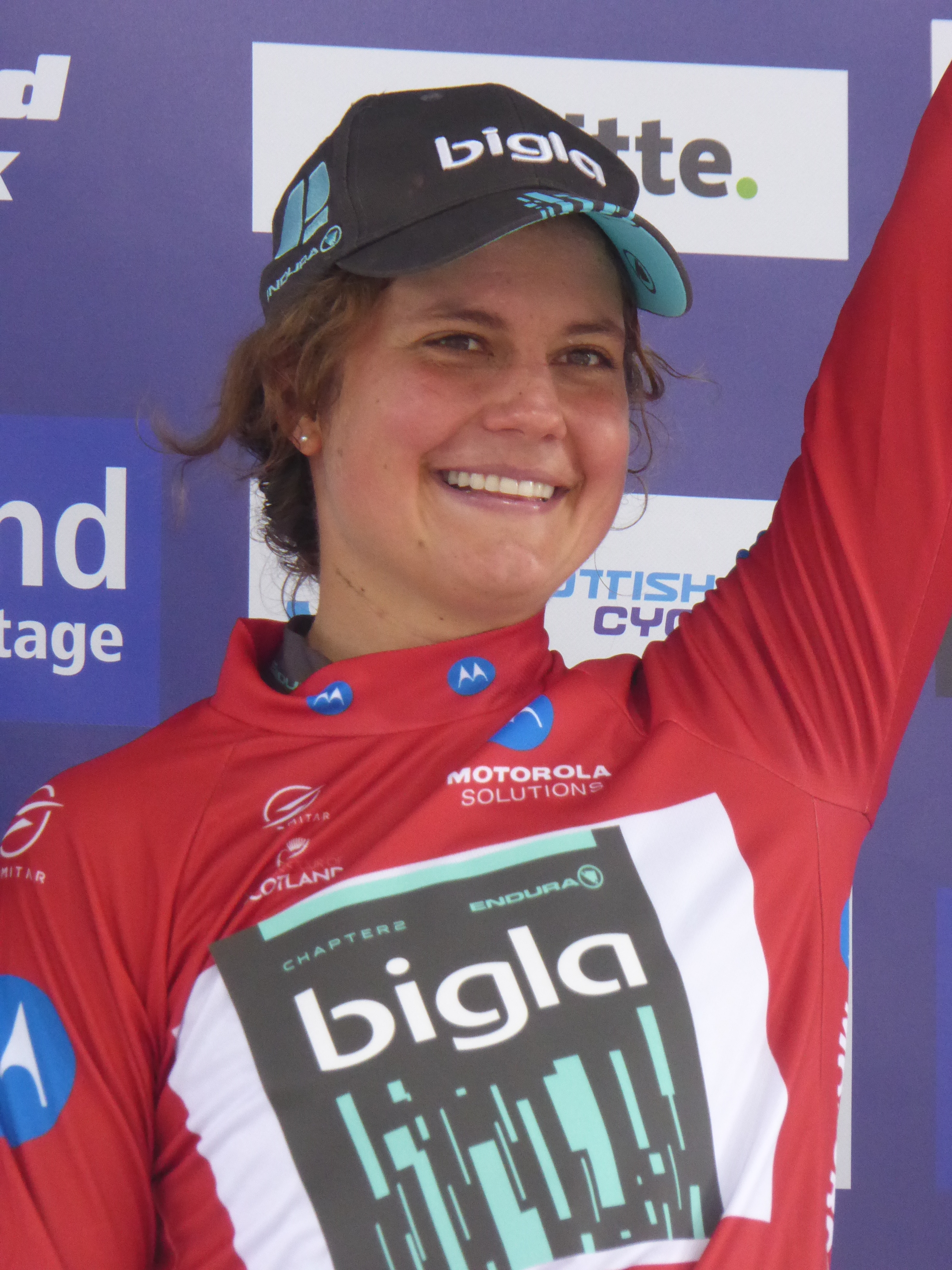
- Thomas at the 2019 Women's Tour of Scotland

Personal information
- Full name: Leah Thomas
- Born: May 30, 1989 (age 37) Cupertino, California, United States

Cycling career
- Sport: Cycling
- Discipline: Road
- Role: Rider
- Rider type: All-rounder

Amateur team
- 2014–2015: Metromint Cycling

Professional teams
- 2015–2017: Twenty16 p/b Sho-Air
- 2018: UnitedHealthcare
- 2019–2020: Bigla Pro Cycling
- 2021: Movistar Team
- 2022: Trek–Segafredo
Medal record
Women's road bicycle racing
Representing United States
Pan American Championships
Gold medal – first place	2019 Ixmiquilpan	Time trial

Leah Thomas (born May 30, 1989) is an American professional racing cyclist, who most recently rode for UCI Women's WorldTeam Trek–Segafredo. During her professional career, Thomas has won eleven races – including the time trial at the 2019 Pan American Road Championships, the 2022 United States National Time Trial Championships, as well as the 2019 Women's Tour of Scotland and 2021 Tour Cycliste Féminin International de l'Ardèche stage races.

== Career ==
=== Early life ===
Born in Cupertino, California, Thomas grew up as a competitive gymnast in the Bay Area, competing in the Central Coast section for Monta Vista High School. Thomas graduated from Monta Vista High School in 2007 and from Northwestern University in 2011. She began running during her time at Northwestern, but due to injury, she was forced to stop and she began cycling shortly thereafter. In 2013 she moved to northeastern Arizona to teach, and she began to delve deeper into cycling there. She moved back to the Bay Area in 2014 to ride and live with her parents.

=== Professional career ===
Thomas turned professional with Twenty16 p/b Sho-Air in 2015, and was part of the team that competed in the women's team time trial at the UCI Road World Championships that year. She took her only win for the team at the 2017 Tour of the Gila, winning the stage three individual time trial in Tyrone, New Mexico, on her way to finishing third overall. She joined UnitedHealthcare for the 2018 season, taking her first successes outside of the United States, winning the general classification at the Tour de Feminin – O cenu Českého Švýcarska in July, and the Chrono Champenois time trial event in September. She later placed fifth in the time trial at the UCI Road World Championships in Austria, missing the podium by seven seconds.

Thomas joined the European-based Bigla Pro Cycling for the 2019 season, and that May, she won the time trial at the Pan American Road Championships in Mexico. A third-place finish followed at the United States National Time Trial Championships, before she won the Women's Tour of Scotland in August. Having finished fourth on stage two, Thomas won an eight-rider sprint in Holyrood Park on the final day and having gained a further two bonus seconds at intermediate sprints during the day, she won the race by five seconds ahead of her former teammate Alison Jackson. She later concluded her season with a fourth victory, coming in the Chrono des Nations time trial in France. Thomas only contested five races in 2020 as a result of the COVID-19 pandemic and her Équipe Paule Ka team encountering financial issues, but won a stage at the Setmana Ciclista Valenciana and she finished third at Strade Bianche.

Having signed a contract extension with Équipe Paule Ka before the team folded, Thomas ultimately signed a contract with the Movistar Team for the 2021 season, and took her best result in one of the classic cycle races, when she finished fourth in Brabantse Pijl. After another third-place finish in the United States National Time Trial Championships, Thomas won the second stage of the Tour Cycliste Féminin International de l'Ardèche, finishing nine seconds clear of a nine-rider group in Beauchastel. She maintained this nine-second gap at the top of the general classification for the remainder of the race, also winning the points classification. Moving to Trek–Segafredo for the 2022 season, Thomas won her first United States National Time Trial Championships in Knoxville, Tennessee, before placing fifth in the time trial at the UCI Road World Championships in Australia. Although holding a contract for the 2023 season, Thomas departed the team at the end of 2022, due to issues resulting from surgery earlier in the year.

== Major results ==
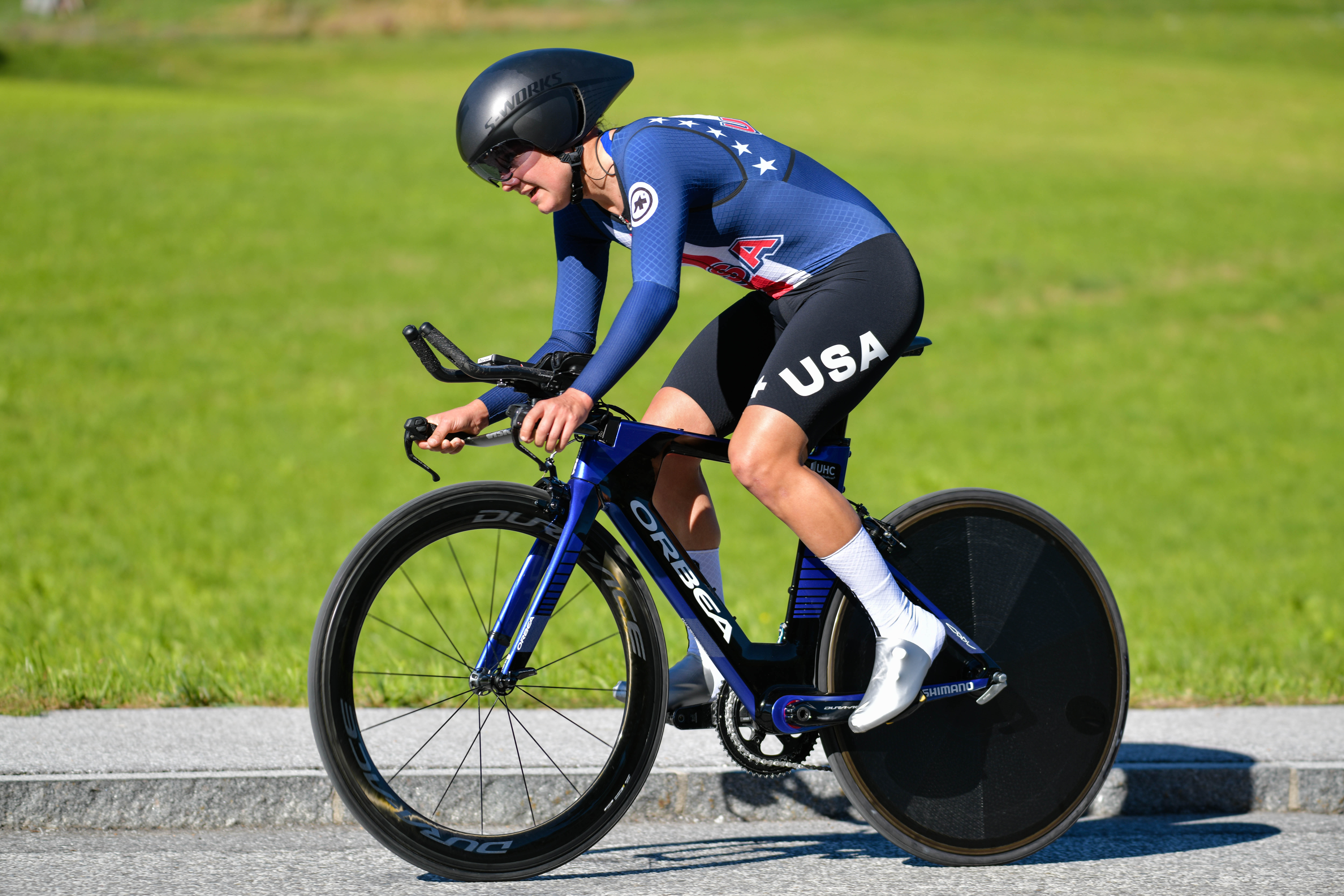
Thomas during the time trial at the 2018 UCI Road World Championships, where she finished fifth

2016
4th Overall Cascade Cycling Classic
5th Overall Tour of California

1st Stage 2 (TTT)

2017
2nd Winston-Salem Cycling Classic
3rd Time trial, National Road Championships
3rd Overall Tour Cycliste Féminin International de l'Ardèche

1st Combination classification

3rd Overall Tour of the Gila

1st Stage 3 (ITT)

4th Overall Tour de Feminin – O cenu Českého Švýcarska
5th Chrono Gatineau
10th Overall Tour of California
2018
1st Overall Tour de Feminin – O cenu Českého Švýcarska
1st Chrono Champenois
1st Stage 1 (ITT) Valley of the Sun
3rd Overall Tour of the Gila
3rd Overall Joe Martin Stage Race
4th Chrono Gatineau
5th UCI Road World Championships – Women's time trial
7th Overall BeNe Ladies Tour
8th Overall Tour of California
9th Overall Holland Ladies Tour
2019
1st Time trial, Pan American Road Championships
1st Overall Women's Tour of Scotland

1st Points classification
1st Stage 3

1st Chrono des Nations
3rd Time trial, National Road Championships
7th UCI Road World Championships – Women's time trial
8th Overall The Women's Tour
10th Overall Holland Ladies Tour
2020
3rd Strade Bianche
4th Overall Setmana Ciclista Valenciana

1st Stage 4

2021
1st Overall Tour Cycliste Féminin International de l'Ardèche

1st Points classification
1st Stage 2

3rd Time trial, National Road Championships
4th Brabantse Pijl
2022
1st Time trial, National Road Championships
5th UCI Road World Championships – Women's time trial

== See also ==
- List of 2018 UCI Women's Teams and riders
