= Flanders Ladies Classic =

Race details
- Date: August
- Region: Belgium
- Discipline: Road

History
- First edition: 2018
- Editions: 2 (as of 2018)
- First winner: Séverine Eraud (FRA)
- Most recent: Julie Van De Velde (BEL)

Flanders Ladies Classic (also known as Flanders Ladies Classic–Sofie De Vuyst) is an elite women's professional one-day road bicycle race held in Belgium and is currently rated by the UCI as a 1.2 race.

== Past winners ==
Year	Country	Rider	Team
2018	France	Séverine Eraud	Experza–Footlogix Ladies Cycling Team
2019	Belgium	Julie Van de Velde	Lotto–Soudal Ladies
2020			
