= 2023 Paris–Roubaix Femmes =

Cycling race

2023 Paris–Roubaix Femmes avec Zwift
2023 UCI Women's World Tour, race 11 of 27
- Event poster, featuring 2022 winners Elisa Longo Borghini and Dylan van Baarle

Race details
- Dates: 8 April 2023
- Stages: 1
- Distance: 145.5 km (90.4 mi)
- Winning time: 3h 42' 56"

Results
	Winner	Alison Jackson (CAN)	(EF Education–Tibco–SVB)
	Second	Katia Ragusa (ITA)	(Liv Racing TeqFind)
	Third	Marthe Truyen (BEL)	(Fenix–Deceuninck)

The 2023 Paris–Roubaix Femmes (officially Paris–Roubaix Femmes avec Zwift) was a French road cycling one-day race that took place on 8 April 2023. It was the 3rd edition of Paris–Roubaix Femmes and the 11th event of the 2023 UCI Women's World Tour.

The race was won by Canadian rider Alison Jackson of EF Education–Tibco–SVB in a sprint finish, after the break stayed away from the chasing peloton behind.

== Route ==
Starting in Denain, the race finished on the velodrome in Roubaix after covering 145.5 kilometres (90.4 mi), with 29.2 kilometres (18.1 mi) of cobblestones, spread out over 17 sectors – including the famed Carrefour de l'Arbre and the Mons-en-Pévèle – both ranked at "five stars" in difficulty. The women covered the same final 17 sectors as the men's race. The route was around 20 kilometres (12 mi) longer that than the last edition, using additional roads south of the start in Denain prior to the cobblestone sectors, which are similar to previous editions.

Organisers noted they consider it "too dangerous" to include the five star cobbled sector Trouée d'Arenberg due to its proximity to the start in Denain, but they also noted that they "do not rule out that we will pass through ... in the future".

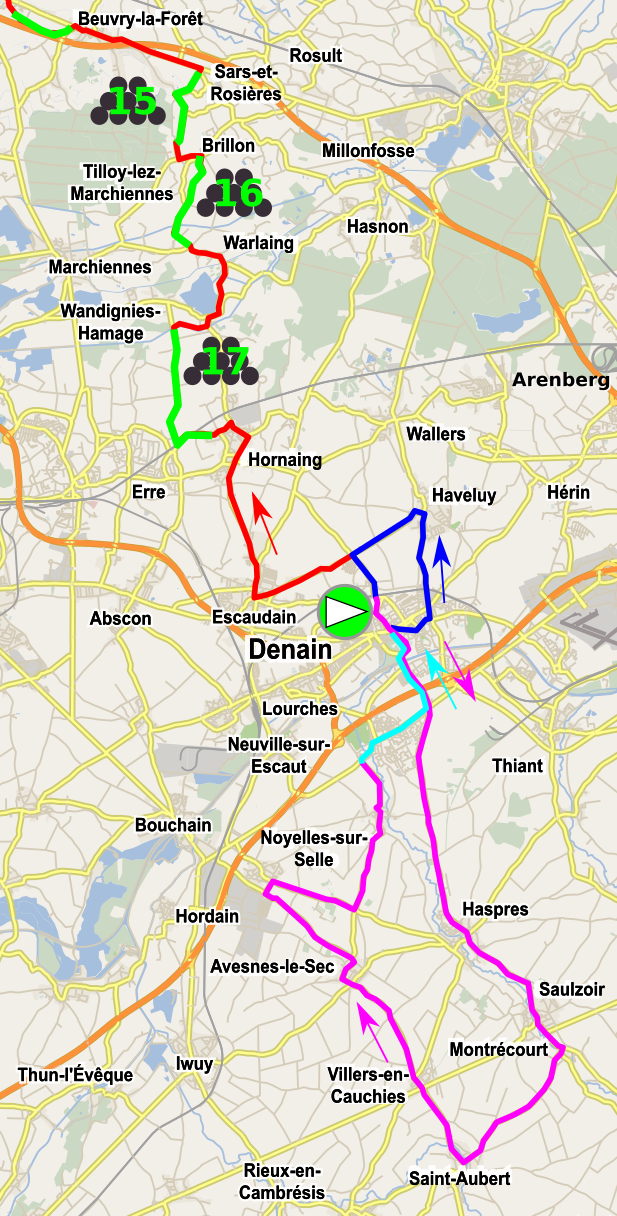
A loop south of the start in Denain before heading north

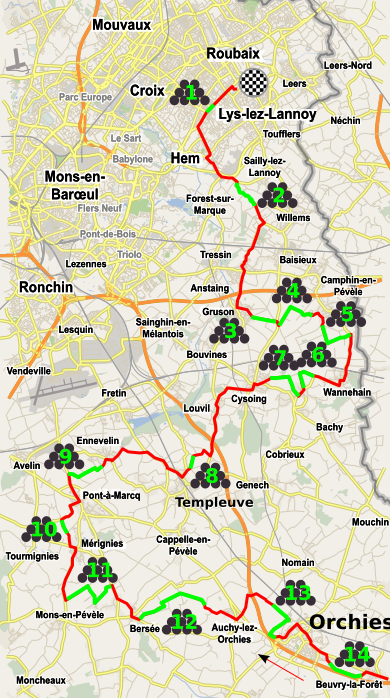
Route from Orchies to finish in Roubaix, similar to previous editions

== Teams ==
23 teams took part in the race. All 15 UCI Women's WorldTeams were automatically invited, and were joined by 8 UCI Women's Continental Teams. The two best 2022 UCI Women's Continental Teams (Ceratizit–WNT Pro Cycling and Lifeplus Wahoo) received an automatic invitation, and the other six teams were selected by Amaury Sport Organisation (ASO), the organisers of the race.

UCI Women's WorldTeams

- Canyon//SRAM
- EF Education–Tibco–SVB
- FDJ–Suez
- Human Powered Health
- Liv Racing TeqFind
- Movistar Team
- Israel Premier Tech Roland
- Team Jayco–AlUla
- Team DSM
- Team Jumbo–Visma
- SD Worx
- Trek–Segafredo
- UAE Team ADQ
- Uno-X Pro Cycling Team
- Fenix–Deceuninck

UCI Women's Continental Teams

- Ceratizit–WNT Pro Cycling
- Parkhotel Valkenburg
- Lifeplus Wahoo
- AG Insurance–Soudal–Quick-Step
- Arkéa Pro Cycling Team
- Zaaf Cycling Team
- Cofidis
- St. Michel–Mavic–Auber93

== Race summary ==
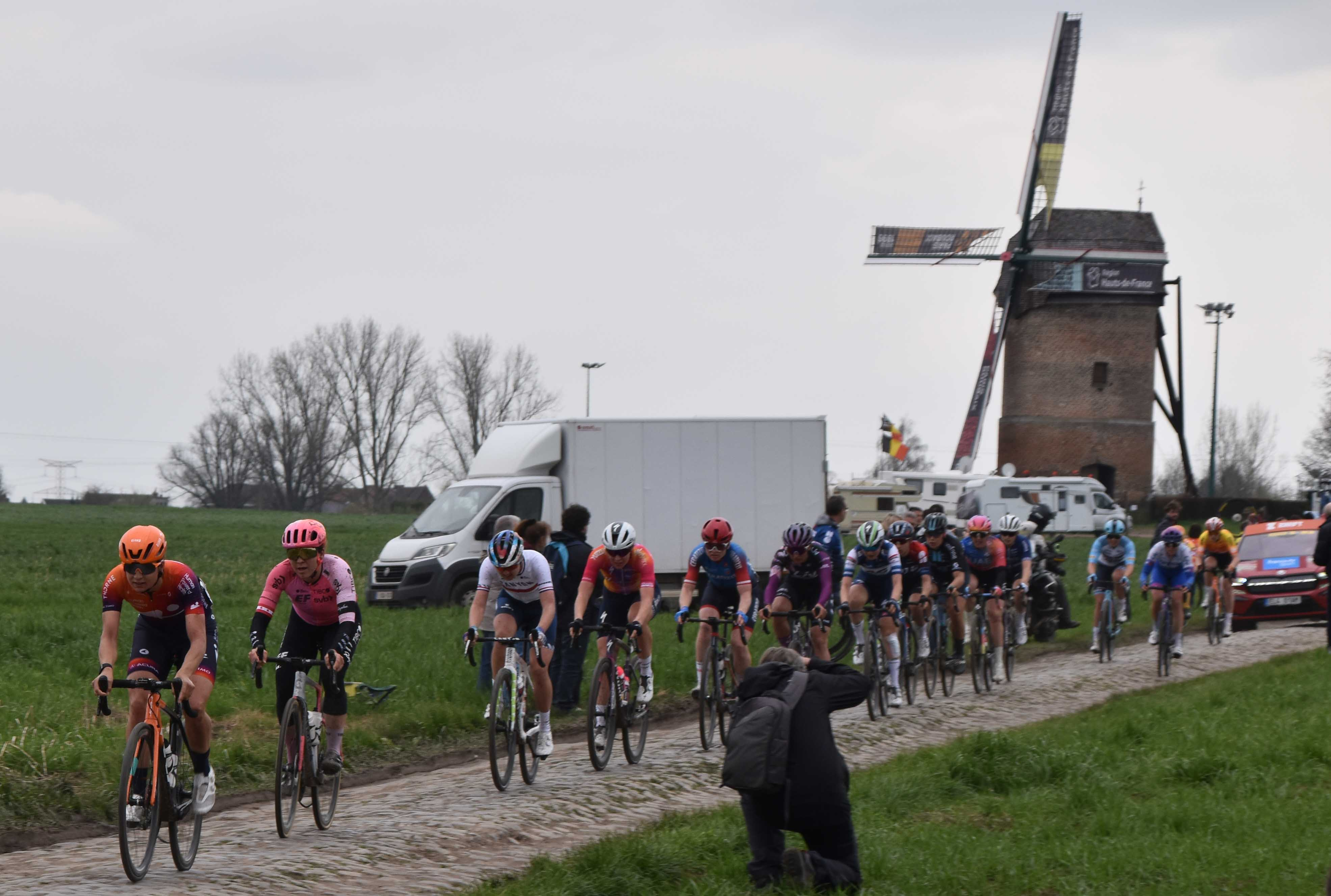
Riders chasing the breakaway with 33 kilometres remaining

Prior to the race, media tipped Lotte Kopecky (SD Worx) for the win, following her victory at Tour of Flanders the previous week. Other contenders included defending champion Elisa Longo Borghini (Trek–Segafredo), Marianne Vos (Team Jumbo–Visma), Pfeiffer Georgi (Team DSM) and Elise Chabbey (Canyon//SRAM).

The race was held in dry conditions, however some roads were wet after previous days of heavy rain. Starting from Denain, a 18 woman breakaway formed within the first 15 kilometres (9.3 mi) of the race, prior to live television coverage being available – which was subsequently criticised. By the time the first pavé sector was reached, the break was around 6 minutes ahead of the peloton. The time between the peloton and breakaway gradually fell. Vos suffered a mechanical, and fell behind the peloton. On the Mons-en-Pévèle sector of pavé with 50 kilometres (31 mi) remaining, Kopecky attacked from the peloton, with key riders such as Longo Borghini, Pfeiffer Georgi and Chabbey joining Kopecky to form a chase group of key contenders.

However, with around 40 kilometres (25 mi) remaining, Longo Borghini crashed on the Pont-Thibault à Ennevelin sector of pavé, taking out Kopecky and others in the chasing group. Sanne Cant (Fenix–Deceuninck) suffered severe wounds to her head in the crash, later requiring stitches to her face at a hospital in Lille. The crash delayed the group – allowing Vos to catch them – but the gap to the breakaway gradually fell over time over the remaining kilometres. By the time the Carrefour de l'Arbre pavé sector was reached, the gap to the break had fallen to under a minute. As the now six-rider breakaway group entered the Roubaix Velodrome with a kilometre to go, the gap to the chasing group was around 10 seconds. Alison Jackson (EF Education–Tibco–SVB) won a sprint finish of the breakaway riders, holding off the chasing group who finished 12 seconds back. Kopecky took the leaders jersey of the UCI Women's World Tour, after winning the sprint of the chasing group.

Jackson later explained that "we were being chased down pretty hard in that last 5km" and that "it's the biggest win of my career and a dream come true". EF Education–Tibco–SVB described the win as the biggest in their history. Second and third place riders Katia Ragusa (Liv Racing TeqFind) and Marthe Truyen (Fenix–Deceuninck) both expressed surprise at their results – with Truyen saying "it feels like a victory".

== Result ==
Final general classification
Rank	Rider	Team	Time
1	Alison Jackson (CAN)	EF Education–Tibco–SVB	3h 42' 56"
2	Katia Ragusa (ITA)	Liv Racing TeqFind	+ 0"
3	Marthe Truyen (BEL)	Fenix–Deceuninck	+ 0"
4	Eugénie Duval (FRA)	FDJ–Suez	+ 0"
5	Marion Borras (FRA)	St. Michel–Mavic–Auber93	+ 0"
6	Marta Lach (POL)	Ceratizit–WNT Pro Cycling	+ 3"
7	Lotte Kopecky (BEL)	SD Worx	+ 12"
8	Pfeiffer Georgi (GBR)	Team DSM	+ 12"
9	Chiara Consonni (ITA)	UAE Team ADQ	+ 12"
10	Marianne Vos (NED)	Team Jumbo–Visma	+ 12"
