= Lucie Jounier =

French cyclist

Personal information
- Born: 16 July 1998 (age 28) Redon, Ille-et-Vilaine, France
- Height: 1.73 m (5 ft 8 in)
- Weight: 58 kg (128 lb; 9 st 2 lb)

Cycling career
- Sport: Cycling
- Discipline: Road
- Role: Rider

Amateur teams
- 2017: Breizh Ladies
- 2018–2019: US Vern

Professional teams
- 2020–2022: Arkéa Pro Cycling Team
- 2023: Team Coop–Hitec Products

Lucie Jounier (born 16 July 1998) is a French professional racing cyclist, who most recently rode for UCI Women's Continental Team Team Coop–Hitec Products. In October 2020, she rode in the women's edition of the 2020 Liège–Bastogne–Liège race in Belgium.

== Major results ==
2015
National Junior Road Championships

4th Time trial
7th Road race

4th Chrono des Nations Women Espoirs
2016
6th Time trial, National Junior Road Championships
2018
7th Road race, National Road Championships
8th Grand Prix International d'Isbergues
2019
3rd Road race, National Under–23 Road Championships
2021
4th Ronde de Mouscron
4th GP Eco-Struct
8th Omloop van de Westhoek - Memorial Stive Vermaut
8th Dwars door de Westhoek
2022
4th GP Oetingen
