= Marthe Truyen =

Belgian cyclist

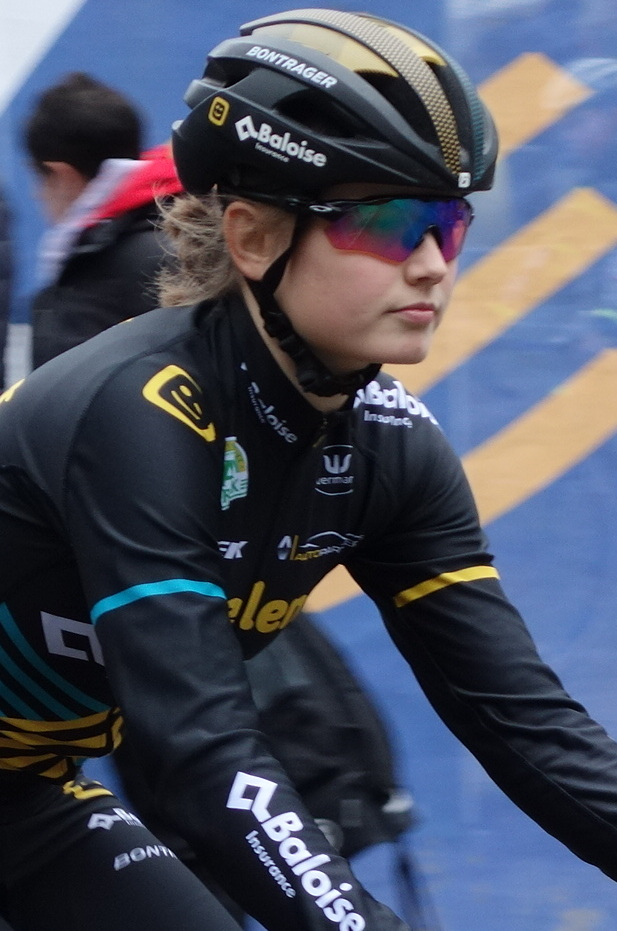
- Truyen in 2020

Personal information
- Born: 30 September 1999 (age 27) Bevel, Nijlen, Belgium
- Height: 1.66 m (5 ft 5 in)
- Weight: 55 kg (121 lb)

Cycling career
- Sport: Cycling
- Current team: Fenix–Premier Tech
- Disciplines: Road; Cyclo-cross
- Role: Rider

Professional teams
- 2019–2021: Telenet–Fidea Lions (cyclo-cross)
- 2021–2022: Ciclismo Mundial
- 2022–2023: IKO–Crelan (cyclo-cross)
- 2023-: Fenix–Premier Tech

Marthe Truyen (born 30 September 1999) is a Belgian cyclist, who currently rides for UCI Women's World Team Fenix–Premier Tech.

== Major results ==
=== Road ===
2022
2nd Diamond Tour
2nd Districtenpijl - Ekeren-Deurne
3rd Veenendaal–Veenendaal
3rd GP Mazda Schelkens
6th Leiedal Koerse
7th Grote Prijs Beerens
8th Dwars door de Westhoek
9th Overall Baloise Ladies Tour
2023
1st Antwerp Port Epic Ladies
2nd GP Mazda Schelkens
3rd Paris–Roubaix Femmes
3rd La Choralis Fourmies Féminine
3rd À travers les Hauts-de-France
4th Grote Prijs Beerens
5th Konvert Koerse
8th Le Samyn des Dames
2024
3rd Veenendaal–Veenendaal
4th Ronde de Mouscron
5th GP Mazda Schelkens
5th GP Lucien Van Impe
5th Grote Prijs Beerens
5th Binche–Chimay–Binche
6th Scheldeprijs
7th Konvert Koerse
9th Drentse Acht van Westerveld
9th Nokere Koerse
2025
2nd Ronde de Mouscron
5th Omloop van het Hageland
2026
3rd Le Samyn

=== Cyclo-cross ===
2021-2022
2nd Podbrezová
2nd Dohnany
2022–2023
3rd Dohnany Day 1
3rd Dohnany Day 2
