= Mireia Trias =

Spanish cyclist (born 2000)

Personal information
- Full name: Mireia Trias Jordán
- Born: 22 March 2000 (age 26)

Cycling career
- Sport: Cycling
- Discipline: Road
- Role: Rider

Professional teams
- 2019: Sopela Women's Team
- 2020–2022: Massi–Tactic
- 2023: Laboral Kutxa–Fundación Euskadi
- 2024: Eneicat–CMTeam

Mireia Trias Jordán (born 22 March 2000) is a Spanish professional racing cyclist, who rode for UCI Women's Continental Team Massi–Tactic. Her elder sister Ariadna Trias is also a professional cyclist, and was a member of the Massi–Tactic team in 2020.

== Major results ==
2020
6th Spanish National Road Race Championships

2021
7th Spanish National Time Trial Championships
