= Katia Ragusa =

Italian cyclist

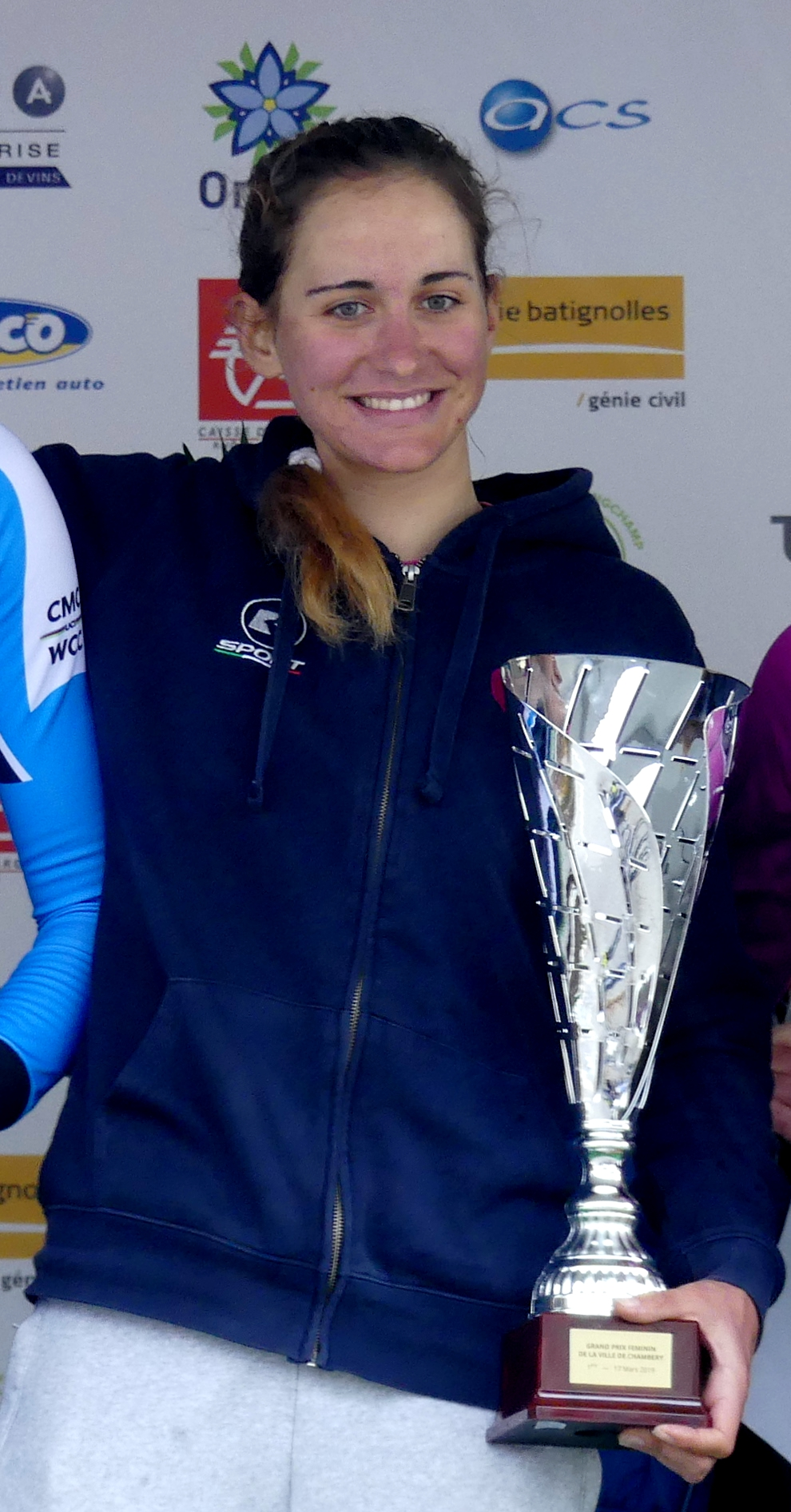
- Ragusa in 2019

Personal information
- Full name: Katia Ragusa
- Born: 19 May 1997 (age 29) Schio, Italy

Cycling career
- Sport: Cycling
- Current team: Human Powered Health
- Discipline: Road
- Role: Rider

Professional teams
- 2016: Servetto Footon
- 2017–2019: Bepink
- 2020–2021: A.R. Monex
- 2022–2023: Liv Racing TeqFind
- 2024-: Human Powered Health

Katia Ragusa (born 19 May 1997) is an Italian professional racing cyclist, who currently rides for UCI Women's World Team Human Powered Health.

In 2020, Ragusa came 2nd in the Italian National Road Race Championships. Ragusa finished 2nd at the 2023 Paris–Roubaix Femmes, the biggest result of her career to date.

== See also ==
- List of 2016 UCI Women's Teams and riders

== Major results ==
2014
1st Time trial, National Junior Road Championships
5th Road race UEC European Junior Road Championships
2015
2nd Time trial, National Junior Road Championships
2017
1st Stage 1 Setmana Ciclista Valenciana (TTT)
2019
1st Mountains classification Vuelta a Burgos Feminas
10th GP de Fourmies
2020
2nd Road race, National Road Championships
8th Brabantse Pijl
8th Overall Women's Tour Down Under
2021
9th Giro dell'Emilia Internazionale Donne Elite
10th Tre Valli Varesine Women's Race
2023
2nd Paris–Roubaix
8th ZLM Omloop der Kempen Ladies
