= Bjerk =

Bjerk is a surname. Notable people with the surname include:

- Thale Bjerk (born 2000), Norwegian racing cyclist
