= Thale Bjerk =

Norwegian cyclist

Personal information
- Full name: Thale Sofie Kielland Bjerk
- Born: 19 August 2000 (age 26)

Cycling career
- Sport: Cycling
- Discipline: Road
- Role: Rider

Amateur team
- 2017–2018: Baerum OCK

Professional team
- 2019–2020: Hitec Products–Birk Sport

Thale Sofie Kielland Bjerk (born 19 August 2000) is a Norwegian professional racing cyclist, who most recently rode for UCI Women's Continental Team Hitec Products–Birk Sport.
