= 2015 Philadelphia Cycling Classic =

2015 UCI Women's Road World Cup, race 6 of 10

Race details
- Dates: June 7, 2015
- Distance: 118.26 km (73.48 mi)
- Winning time: 2h 58' 01"

Results
	Winner	Lizzie Armitstead (GBR)	(Boels–Dolmans)
	Second	Elisa Longo Borghini (ITA)	(Wiggle–Honda)
	Third	Alena Amialiusik (BLR)	(Velocio–SRAM)

The 2015 Philadelphia Cycling Classic, known as The Parx Casino Philly Cycling Classic for sponsorship purposes, was the sixth round of the 2015 UCI Women's Road World Cup. It was held on June 7, 2015, in Philadelphia, Pennsylvania, United States. The event had last appeared in the Women's Road World Cup in 2001, as the Liberty Classic.

On a six-lap course which climbed the Manayunk Wall – an 800-metre (2,600 ft) long climb with an average gradient of 8 percent – at the end of each lap, Jasmin Glaesser (Optum–KBS) established an early breakaway, leading for two laps before being caught by the peloton. Her breakaway earned her sufficient "Queen of the Mountain" points for her to win that title. Further attacks were made, but none were successful. On the final ascent of Manayunk Wall, Lizzie Armitstead (Boels–Dolmans) won in a sprint, beating Elisa Longo Borghini (Wiggle–Honda) and Alena Amialiusik (Velocio–SRAM).

== Entry ==
The organizers of the Philadelphia Cycling Classic indicated that they would invite the top twenty ranked UCI teams at the end of 2014, and then any further allocations would be assigned to highly-ranked national teams and other UCI teams. A list of seventeen participating teams was published in March, just over ten weeks prior to the race. Of those teams, Astana–Acca Due O, BePink–La Classica and the Canadian national team did not feature in the race, while further teams were added to feature 96 riders across 19 teams.

UCI Teams

- Alé–Cipollini
- Bigla Pro Cycling Team
- BMW p/b Happy Tooth Dental
- BTC City Ljubljana
- Boels–Dolmans
- Team Hitec Products
- Optum–KBS
- Pepper Palace p/b The Happy Tooth
- Itau Shimano Ladies Power Team
- Twenty16 p/b Sho-Air
- Team TIBCO–SVB
- UnitedHealthcare
- Velocio–SRAM
- Wiggle–Honda
- Xirayas de San Luis
Elite teams
- Colavita–Fine Cooking
- Fearless Femme p/b Haute Wheels Racing
National teams
- Colombia
- Mexico

== Course ==
The Philadelphia Cycling Classic followed a six-lap course near the Schuylkill River in northwest Philadelphia. It started and finished at the top of the Manayunk Wall, an 800-metre (2,600 ft) long climb which peaked at a gradient of 17 percent, though it only averaged around 8 percent. The course also included climbs up Lemon Hill and Strawberry Mansion Drive. Each of the six laps was 19.71 kilometres (12.25 miles) in length, giving a total race length of 118.26 kilometres (73.48 miles). "Queen of the Mountain" points were awarded for the first rider to the top of Manayunk Wall and Lemon Hill each lap, while an intermediate sprint was located roughly halfway along the outward section of the lap, where Kelly Drive intersected with Midvale Avenue.

== Preview ==
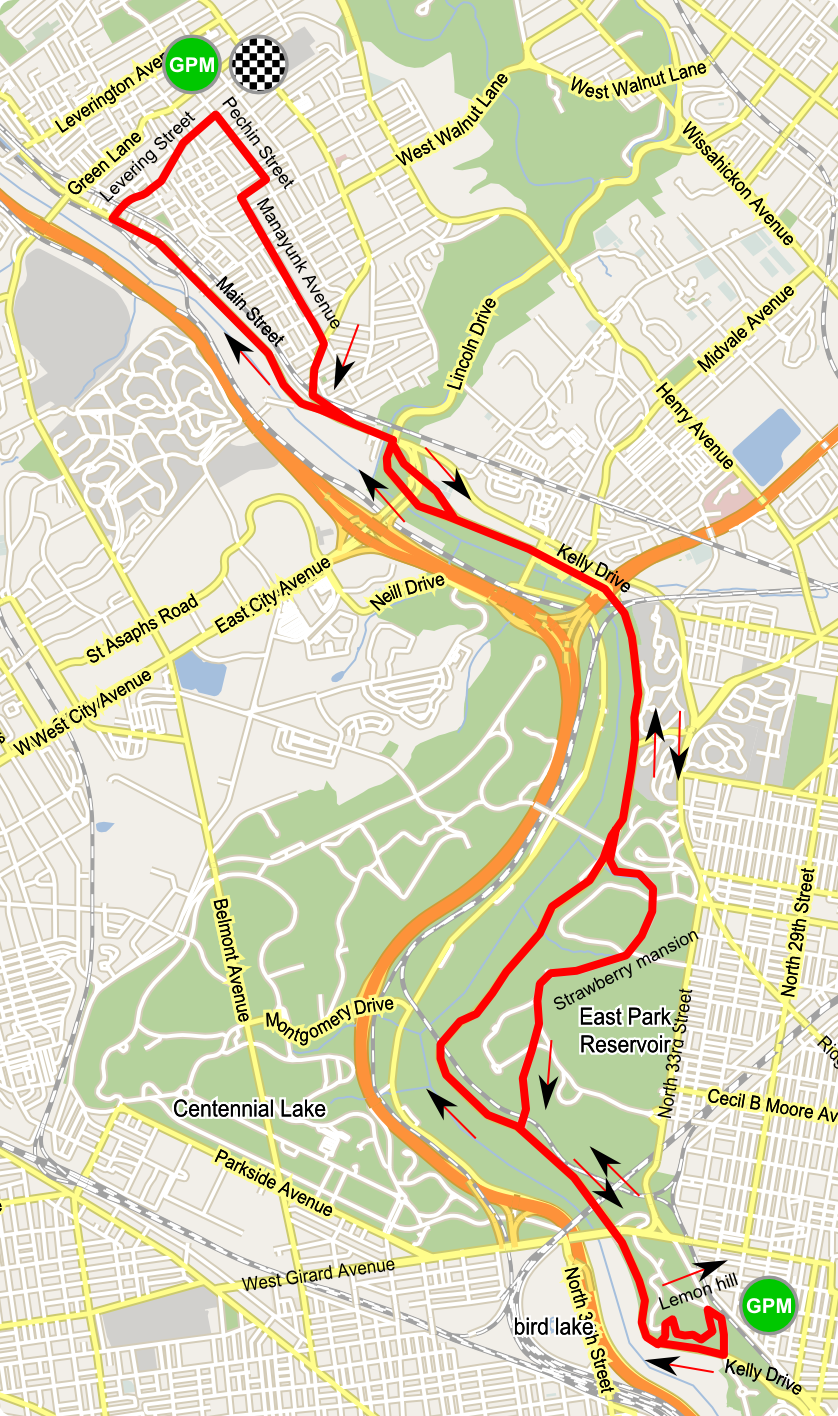
Circuit of the Philadelphia Cycling Classic 2015

After five rounds of the 2015 UCI Women's Road World Cup, there had been five different winners; Jolien D'Hoore at the Ronde van Drenthe, Lizzie Armitstead at the Trofeo Alfredo Binda-Comune di Cittiglio, Elisa Longo Borghini at the Tour of Flanders, Anna van der Breggen at the La Flèche Wallonne Féminine, and Giorgia Bronzini at the Tour of Chongming Island. Anna van der Breggen led the World Cup standings as the racing moved to Philadelphia, with 290 points, but her Rabobank-Liv Woman Cycling Team team had opted not to take part in the event. Annemiek van Vleuten and Jolien D'Hoore, who were second and third in the standings, had not travelled with their teams to the event. Elisa Longo Borghini (Wiggle–Honda) and Lizzie Armitstead (Boels–Dolmans), who entered the race placed fourth and fifth, were highlighted as possible favorites for the race, though Armitstead's teammate, Evelyn Stevens had won the race in both 2013 and 2014.

== Race ==
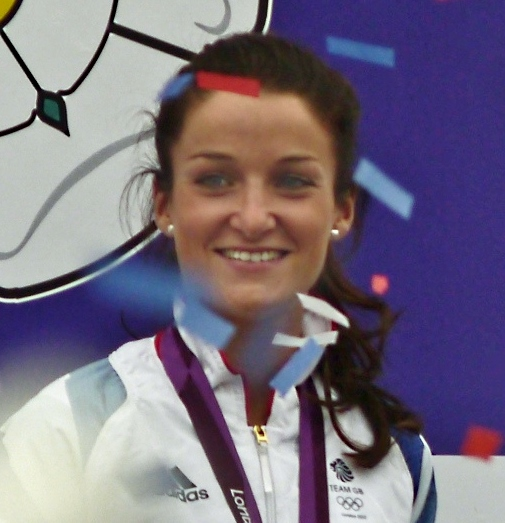
Lizzie Armitstead won the race in a sprint finish up Manayunk Wall.

There was no significant breakaways during the first lap, but as the riders climbed Lemon Hill on the second of six laps, Jasmin Glaesser (Optum–KBS) established a gap, and maintained the lead of the race for two laps, earning her the Queen of the Mountain award. She was caught during an attack by Alison Jackson (Twenty16 p/b Sho-Air), but the pair could not maintain their advantage, and were caught by the peloton on the climb up Manayunk Wall at the end of the third lap. Team Hitec Products attacked each of the intermediate sprints, with Kirsten Wild providing a lead-out each lap for her teammate Emilie Moberg. They also attempted to make breakaways of their own, and Moberg managed to lead off the front of the peloton for around half a lap before being caught once more by the peloton. The Velocio–SRAM team attacked through the fourth lap, with each of their riders riding off the front in turn, but they failed to establish a breakaway.

Entering the final lap, the peloton remained close, although a number of riders had fallen behind or dropped out, particularly through the cobbled bends at the base of the Manayunk Wall. A series of attacks were made on the final lap; Charlotte Becker (Team Hitec Products) gained an advantage, but it was closed again due to work from the Boels–Dolmans team. Once Becker had been caught, Dalia Muccioli (Alé–Cipollini) made a move, but the Twenty16 p/b Sho-Air team worked to eliminate her lead. A sprint to the bottom of the Manayunk Wall was led by Loren Rowney (Velocio–SRAM), but more riders struggled over the cobblestones and dropped back. Alexis Ryan (UnitedHealthcare) took over the lead of the peloton at the bottom of the hill, and established a fast pace up the lower slopes, leading Joëlle Numainville (Bigla Pro Cycling Team) and her teammate Coryn Rivera. Optum–KBS also had a number of riders near the front, while Elisa Longo Borghini (Wiggle–Honda) and Lizzie Armitstead (Boels–Dolmans) were just behind. Longo Borghini attacked first, but Armitstead went with her and passed her just before the line to claim victory. Alena Amialiusik (Velocio–SRAM) and Shelley Olds (Bigla Pro Cycling Team) finished in third and fourth; the top four were all classified with the same time.

== Results ==
=== Race results ===
Results
Rank	Rider	Team	Time
1	Lizzie Armitstead (GBR)	Boels–Dolmans	2h 58' 01"
2	Elisa Longo Borghini (ITA)	Wiggle–Honda	+ 0"
3	Alena Amialiusik (BLR)	Velocio–SRAM	+ 0"
4	Shelley Olds (USA)	Bigla Pro Cycling Team	+ 0"
5	Coryn Rivera (USA)	UnitedHealthcare	+ 3"
6	Evelyn Stevens (USA)	Boels–Dolmans	+ 5"
7	Leah Kirchmann (CAN)	Optum–KBS	+ 5"
8	Lex Albrecht (CAN)	Optum–KBS	+ 5"
9	Maria Giulia Confalonieri (ITA)	Alé–Cipollini	+ 5"
10	Brianna Walle (USA)	Optum–KBS	+ 12"

=== World Cup standings ===
Individual ranking after 6 of 10 World Cup races
Rank	Rider	Team	Points
1	Lizzie Armitstead (GBR)	Boels–Dolmans	315
2	Elisa Longo Borghini (ITA)	Wiggle–Honda	296
3	Anna van der Breggen (NED)	Rabobank-Liv Woman Cycling Team	290
4	Annemiek van Vleuten (NED)	Bigla Pro Cycling Team	226
5	Alena Amialiusik (BLR)	Velocio–SRAM	225
6	Jolien D'Hoore (BEL)	Wiggle–Honda	220
7	Pauline Ferrand-Prévot (FRA)	Rabobank-Liv Woman Cycling Team	175
8	Shelley Olds (USA)	Bigla Pro Cycling Team	140
9	Giorgia Bronzini (ITA)	Wiggle–Honda	130
10	Elena Cecchini (ITA)	Lotto–Soudal Ladies	122
