= 2015 Tour of Chongming Island World Cup =

2015 UCI Women's Road World Cup, race 5 of 10

Race details
- Dates: 17 May 2015
- Distance: 125 km (78 mi)
- Winning time: 3h 09' 45"

Results
	Winner	Giorgia Bronzini (ITA)	(Wiggle–Honda)
	Second	Kirsten Wild (NED)	(Team Hitec Products)
	Third	Fanny Riberot (FRA)	(France (national team))

The 2015 Tour of Chongming Island World Cup was a one-day road cycling race, run as part of the ninth Tour of Chongming Island, which included both a multi-stage event and a single-stage event. The single-stage race, which was part of the 2015 UCI Women's Road World Cup, was held on 17 May 2015, in Shanghai, China.

On wide, mostly flat highways, there were no significant breakaways in the first half of the race, until the duo of Liang Hongyu (China Chongming–Liv–Champion System) and Anastasia Chulkova (BePink–La Classica) established a one-minute lead over the peloton. Their advantage was slowly broken down, predominately due to the work of the Team Hitec Products riders, and they were reabsorbed into the peloton with 7 kilometres (4.3 miles) to go. In a bunch sprint, the Italian rider, Giorgia Bronzini (Wiggle–Honda) won, beating 2014 winners Kirsten Wild (Team Hitec Products) and Fanny Riberot (France national team).

== Entry ==
Ten of the UCI women's teams entered the race, each featuring five or six riders. They were joined by eight national teams containing either four or five riders, bringing the total entry up to 93 riders.

UCI Teams

- Alé–Cipollini
- Astana–Acca Due O
- Bigla Pro Cycling Team
- BePink–La Classica
- Poitou-Charentes.Futuroscope.86
- China Chongming–Liv–Champion System
- Team Hitec Products
- Lensworld.eu–Zannata
- Servetto Footon
- Wiggle–Honda
Nations
- France
- Russia
- Hong Kong China
- Taiwan
- Thailand
- South Korea
- China
- Indonesia

== Course ==
The route changed from previous years. The race started at the Shanghai Oriental Sports Center and took place almost entirely on wide, straight highways, with corners predominantly being expansive ninety-degree bends. The course initially followed the Middle Ring Road, the Huaxia Elevated Road and the G1501 Shanghai Ring Expressway, before entering the 10-kilometre-long (6.2 mi) tunnel under the Yangtze river to reach Changxing Island, shortly followed by a 8-kilometre-long (5.0 mi) bridge to Chongming Island, from where the route followed the course of previous years, along slightly smaller roads to the finish.

== Preview ==
After four rounds of the 2015 UCI Women's Road World Cup, there had been four different winners; Jolien D'Hoore at the Ronde van Drenthe, Lizzie Armitstead at the Trofeo Alfredo Binda-Comune di Cittiglio, Elisa Longo Borghini at the Tour of Flanders, and Anna van der Breggen at the La Flèche Wallonne Féminine. Van der Breggen led the World Cup standings as the racing moved to China for the Tour of Chongming Island, with 290 points, but her Rabobank-Liv Woman Cycling Team were not invited to take part in the event. Kirsten Wild won both the stage race and the World Cup event in 2014, and repeated her success in the 2015 stage race. She was the pre-race favourite to win the 2015 World Cup race on a course that favoured sprinters.

== Race ==
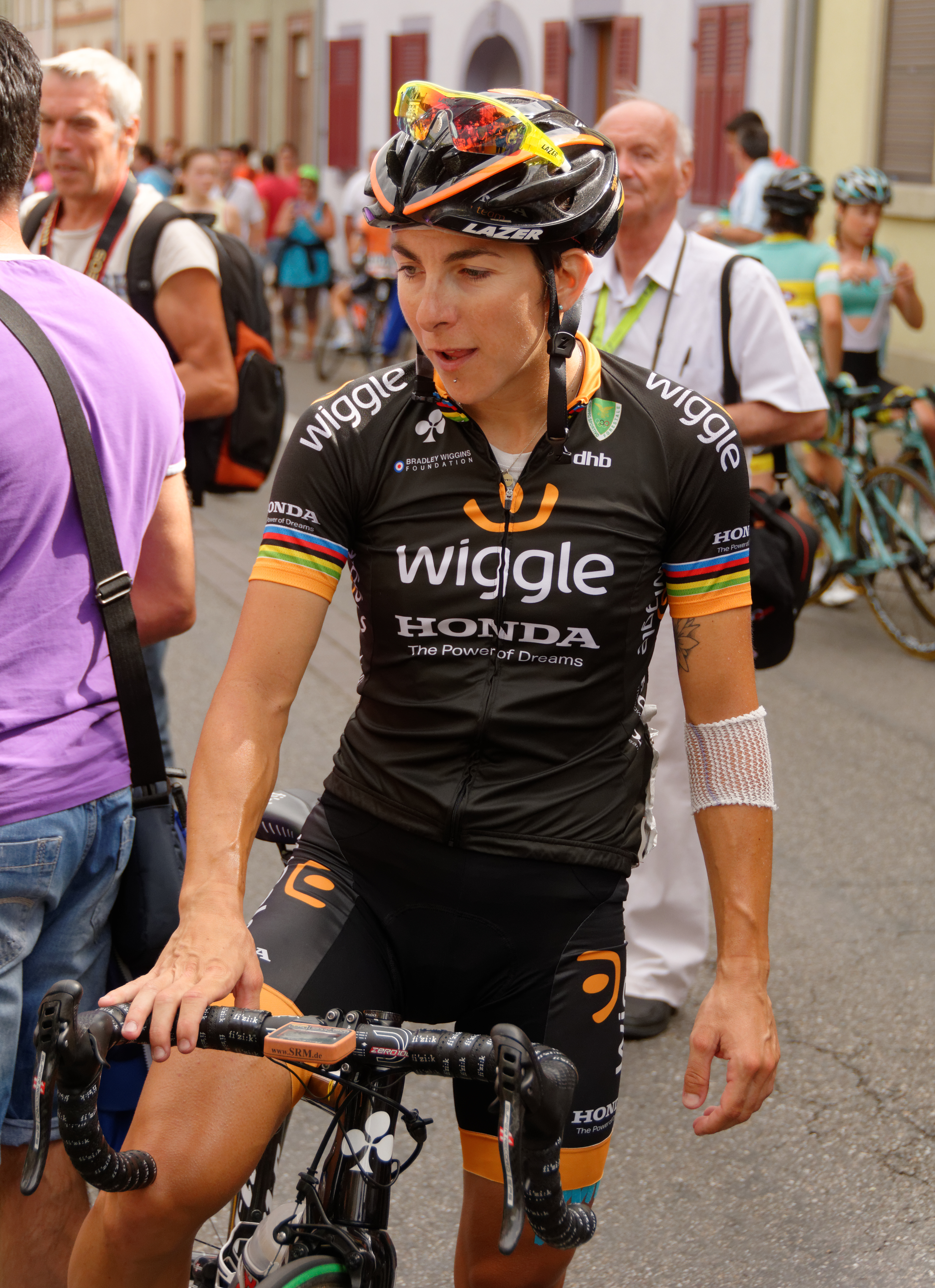
Giorgia Bronzini won the race in a bunch sprint.

There were early attacks by two of the Asian teams, China Chongming–Liv–Champion System and the Korean national team, but on each occasion they were caught back up by the peloton reasonably quickly. The first intermediate sprint was won by Simona Frapporti (Alé–Cipollini), while a subsequent Queen of the Mountain climb was won by Lauren Kitchen (Team Hitec Products). Crossing the Shanghai Yangtze River Bridge, some riders fell off the back of the peloton in the strong crosswinds. Shortly after, two riders, Liang Hongyu (China Chongming–Liv–Champion System) and Anastasia Chulkova (BePink–La Classica), broke away and established a lead of roughly one minute, during which Chulkova claimed the second intermediate sprint. Team Hitec Products riders were at the front of the peloton to close the gap, though another group threatened to split around 15 kilometres (9.3 miles) from the finish. The peloton caught up with the leading duo with 7 kilometres (4.3 miles) of the race remaining.

Closing towards the finish in a bunch sprint, Wiggle–Honda had intended Chloe Hosking to be the sprinter to try and win, but she got caught up behind a crash in the final kilometre, and so Giorgia Bronzini acted as a lead-out for Annette Edmondson. She had initially intended to move out from behind Kirsten Wild (Team Hitec Products) for a sprint with around 700 metres (2,300 ft) to go, but there was no room, so she stayed in Wild's draft. She then found that Edmondson had not been able to follow her, and opted to defend her position and launch a late sprint to pass Wild. Bronzini won, followed by Wild and Fanny Riberot, riding for the France national team. The first 74 riders were all designated the same time.

== Results ==
=== Race results ===
Result
Rank	Rider	Team	Time
1	Giorgia Bronzini (ITA)	Wiggle–Honda	3h 09' 45"
2	Kirsten Wild (NED)	Team Hitec Products	+ 0"
3	Fanny Riberot (FRA)	France (national team)	+ 0"
4	Shelley Olds (USA)	Bigla Pro Cycling Team	+ 0"
5	Lotta Lepistö (FIN)	Bigla Pro Cycling Team	+ 0"
6	Kim de Baat (NED)	Lensworld.eu–Zannata	+ 0"
7	Pascale Jeuland (FRA)	Poitou-Charentes.Futuroscope.86	+ 0"
8	Annalisa Cucinotta (ITA)	Alé–Cipollini	+ 0"
9	Roxane Fournier (FRA)	Bigla Pro Cycling Team	+ 0"
10	Jutatip Maneephan (THA)	Thailand (national team)	+ 0"

=== World Cup standings ===
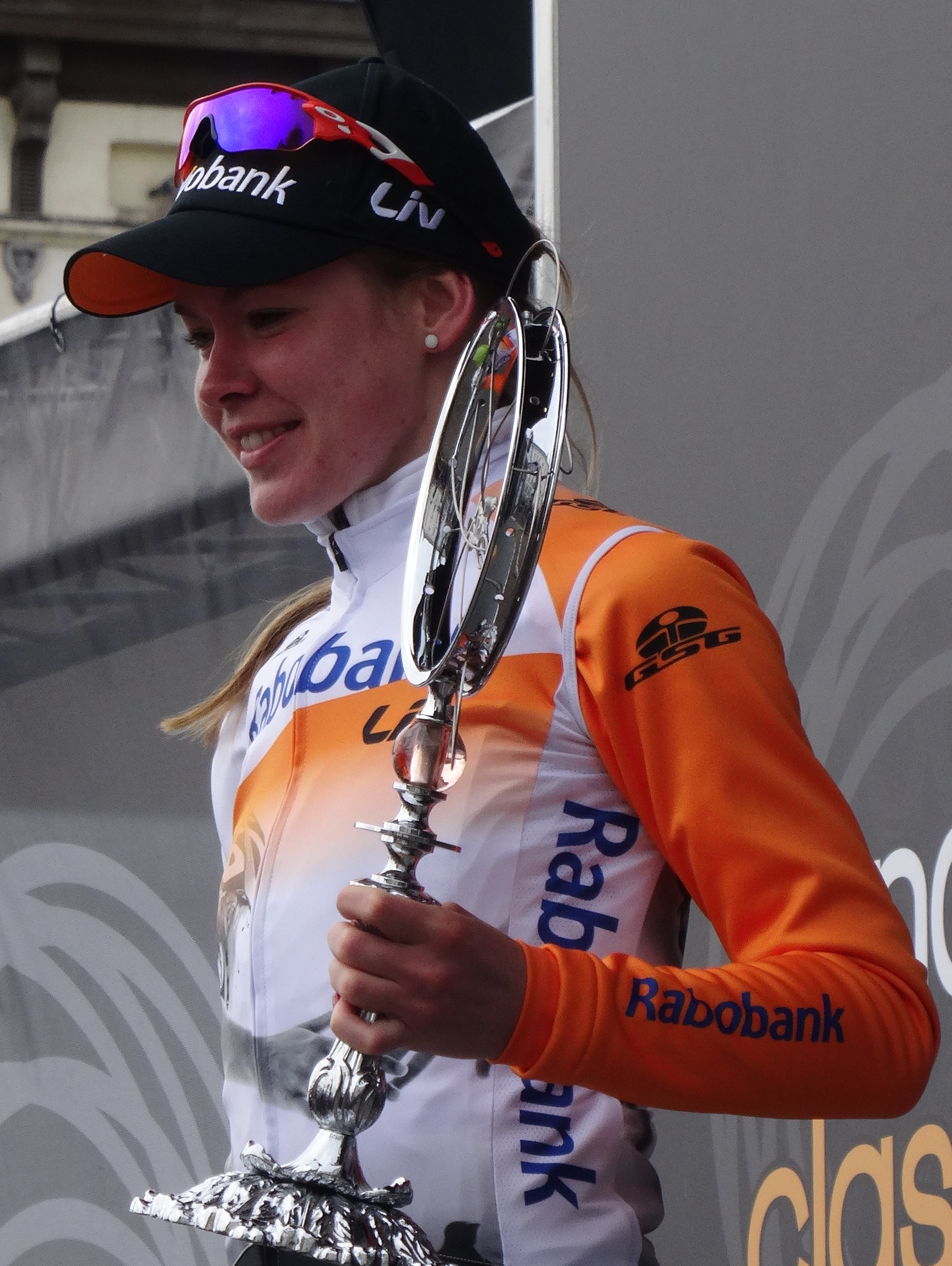
Despite not competing at Chongming Island, Anna van der Breggen remained top of the World Cup standings.

Individual ranking after 5 of 10 World Cup races
Rank	Rider	Team	Points
1	Anna van der Breggen (NED)	Rabobank-Liv Woman Cycling Team	290
2	Annemiek van Vleuten (NED)	Bigla Pro Cycling Team	226
3	Jolien D'Hoore (BEL)	Wiggle–Honda	220
4	Elisa Longo Borghini (ITA)	Wiggle–Honda	196
5	Lizzie Armitstead (GBR)	Boels–Dolmans	195
6	Pauline Ferrand-Prévot (FRA)	Rabobank-Liv Woman Cycling Team	175
7	Alena Amialiusik (BLR)	Velocio–SRAM	140
8	Giorgia Bronzini (ITA)	Wiggle–Honda	126
9	Elena Cecchini (ITA)	Lotto–Soudal Ladies	122
10	Kirsten Wild (NED)	Team Hitec Products	120
