= 2015 Le Samyn des Dames =

- Poster of the event

Race details
- Dates: 4 March 2015
- Stages: 1
- Distance: 112.0 km (69.6 mi)

Results
	Winner	Chantal Blaak (NED)	(Boels–Dolmans)
	Second	Anna van der Breggen (NED)	(Rabobank-Liv Woman Cycling Team)
	Third	Emma Johansson (SWE)	(Orica–AIS)

The 2015 Le Samyn des Dames was the fourth running of the women's Le Samyn, a women's bicycle race in Hainaut, Belgium. It was held on 4 March 2015 over a distance of 112.0 kilometres (69.6 miles) starting in Quaregnon and finishing in Dour. It was rated by the UCI as a 1.2 category race.

== Race ==
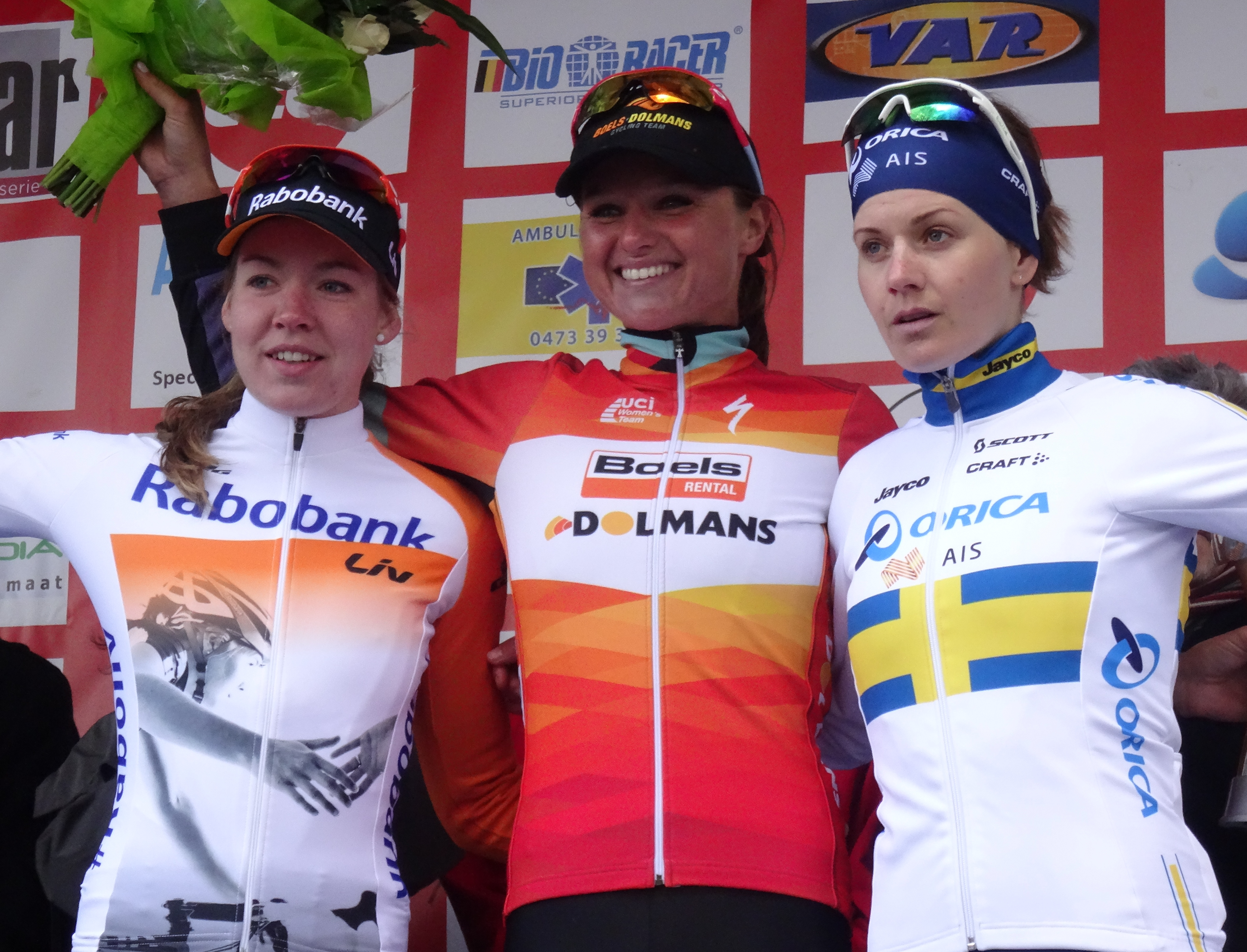
The podium

Due to the high speed in the beginning of the race, the bunch broke into several groups. The first group got an advantage of 25 seconds, but later it all came together. Within the last two laps of a 24.7-kilometre (15.3-mile) circuit there were the first mountain sprints. The first sprint was won by Anna van der Breggen ahead of Chloe Hosking and Ellen van Dijk, of which Van der Breggen and Van Dijk were the two riders who broke away on a mountain in Omloop Het Nieuwsblad a few days earlier and won the race. Due to the mountain sprint the peloton broke in several groups. After the second mountain sprint won by Sofie De Vuyst ahead of Elena Cecchini and Emma Johansson, Gracie Elvin tried to escape but was pulled back a bit later. In the last lap six riders (Johansson, Ashleigh Moolman, Van der Breggen, Hosking, Megan Guarnier and Amy Pieters) from the front group escaped with 20 kilometres (12 miles) to go and got a maximum advantage of 1 minutes and 10 seconds with 15 kilometres (9.3 miles) to go. Johansson reached the third mountain first, ahead of Guarnier and Moolman. In the final 4 kilometres (2.5 miles) after the last cobbled section, van Dijk started chasing at the head of the peloton and was able to close the gap with the front group. She also was a good lead-out for her Boels–Dolmans team mate Chantal Blaak who won the peloton sprint. Van der Breggen finished second and Johansson third.

== Result ==
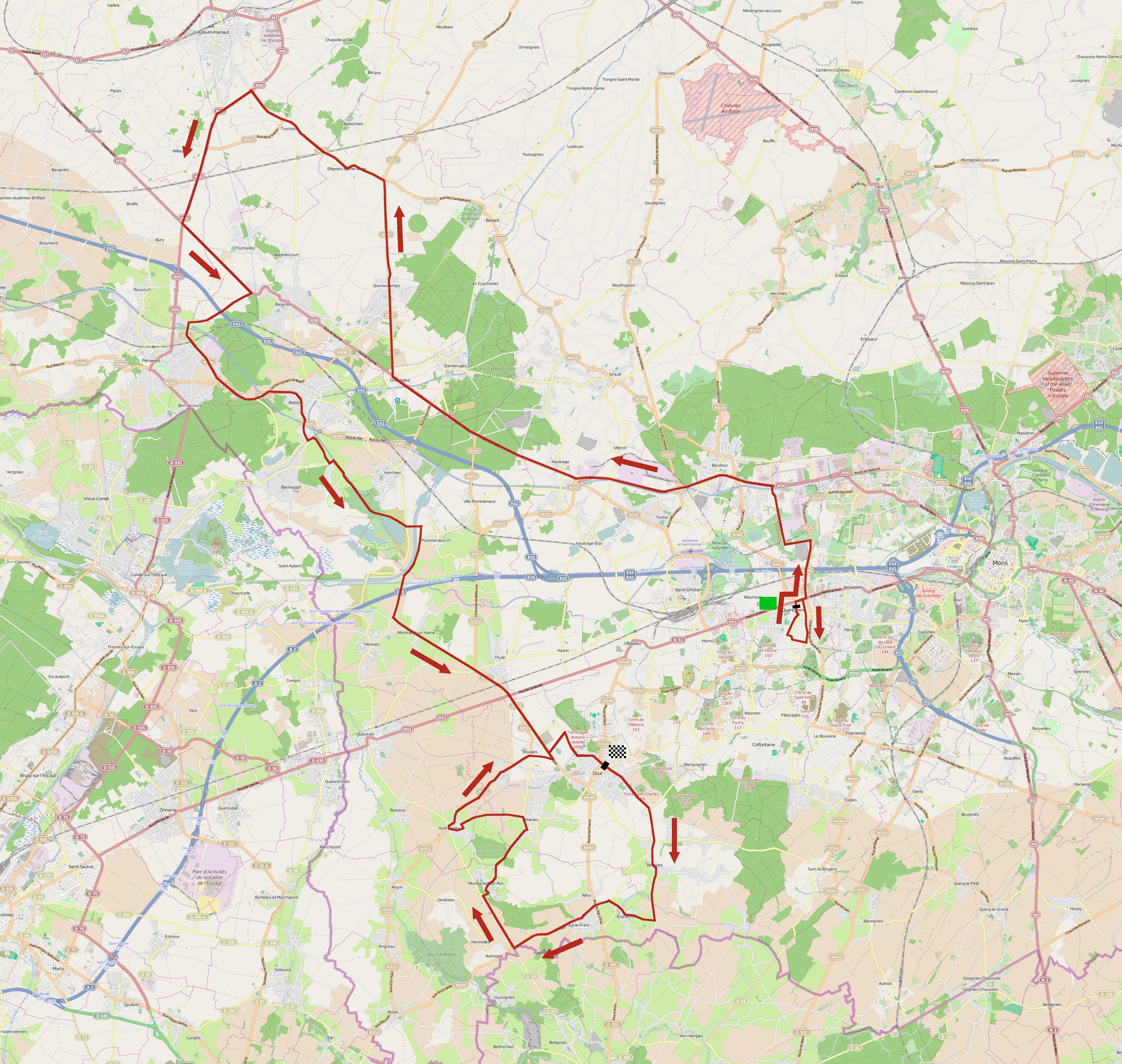
The profile of the race

Result
Rank	Rider	Team	Time
1	Chantal Blaak (NED)	Boels–Dolmans	2h 56' 03"
2	Anna van der Breggen (NED)	Rabobank-Liv Woman Cycling Team	+ 0"
3	Emma Johansson (SWE)	Orica–AIS	+ 0"
4	Chloe Hosking (AUS)	Wiggle–Honda	+ 0"
5	Jolien D'Hoore (BEL)	Wiggle–Honda	+ 0"
6	Ashleigh Moolman (RSA)	Bigla Pro Cycling Team	+ 0"
7	Amy Pieters (NED)	Team Liv–Plantur	+ 0"
8	Roxane Knetemann (NED)	Rabobank-Liv Woman Cycling Team	+ 0"
9	Megan Guarnier (USA)	Boels–Dolmans	+ 0"
10	Elena Cecchini (ITA)	Lotto–Soudal Ladies	+ 0"

== See also ==
- 2015 in women's road cycling
