= 2015 Holland Hills Classic =

Race details
- Dates: 29 May 2015
- Distance: 131.4 km (81.6 mi)
- Winning time: 3h 44' 37"

Results
	Winner	Lizzie Armitstead (GBR)	(Boels–Dolmans)
	Second	Emma Johansson (SWE)	(Orica–AIS)
	Third	Katarzyna Niewiadoma (POL)	(Rabobank-Liv Woman Cycling Team)

The 2015 Holland Hills Classic (known as the 2015 Boels Rental Hills Classic for sponsorship purposes) was a one-day women's cycle race held between Sittard and Berg en Terblijt in the Netherlands. It was held over a distance of 131.4 kilometres (81.6 miles) on 29 May 2015, and was held as a UCI category 1.1 race.

== Results ==
Result
Rank	Rider	Team	Time
1	Lizzie Armitstead (GBR)	Boels–Dolmans	3h 44' 37"
2	Emma Johansson (SWE)	Orica–AIS	+ 0"
3	Katarzyna Niewiadoma (POL)	Rabobank-Liv Woman Cycling Team	+ 0"
4	Sabrina Stultiens (NED)	Team Liv–Plantur	+ 0"
5	Elisa Longo Borghini (ITA)	Wiggle–Honda	+ 0"
6	Chantal Blaak (NED)	Boels–Dolmans	+ 4"
7	Katrin Garfoot (AUS)	Orica–AIS	+ 4"
8	Ellen van Dijk (NED)	Boels–Dolmans	+ 4"
9	Amy Pieters (NED)	Team Liv–Plantur	+ 4"
10	Thalita de Jong (NED)	Rabobank-Liv Woman Cycling Team	+ 4"

== See also ==
- 2015 in women's road cycling
