= Josu Etxeberria =

Spanish cyclist (born 2000)

Personal information
- Full name: Josu Etxeberria Azpiricueta
- Born: 9 September 2000 (age 26) Iturmendi, Spain
- Height: 1.78 m (5 ft 10 in)
- Weight: 65 kg (143 lb)

Cycling career
- Sport: Cycling
- Discipline: Road
- Role: Rider

Amateur teams
- 2017–2018: Irabia Intersport
- 2019–2020: Caja Rural–Seguros RGA amateur

Professional teams
- 2020: Caja Rural–Seguros RGA (stagiaire)
- 2021–2024: Caja Rural–Seguros RGA

Josu Etxeberria Azpiricueta (born 9 September 2000) is a Spanish cyclist, who last rode for UCI ProTeam Caja Rural–Seguros RGA.

== Major results ==
2019
1st Stage 4 Vuelta a Palencia
2nd Overall Vuelta a Cantabria
2020
1st Overall Vuelta a Zamora

1st Stage 3
