= 2015 The Women's Tour =

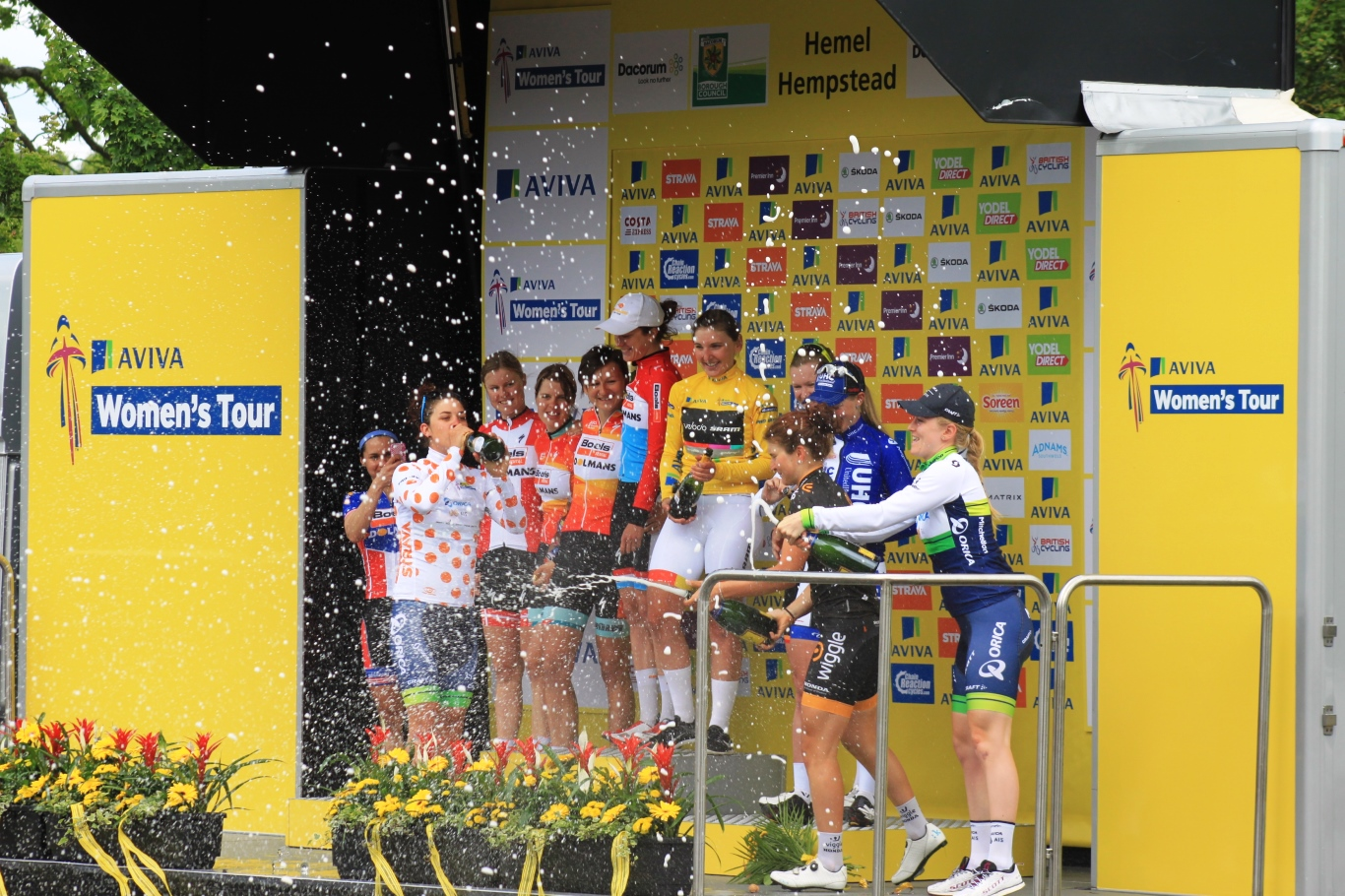
- Winners of The Women's Tour in 2015

Race details
- Dates: 17–21 June 2015
- Stages: 5
- Distance: 596.2 km (370.5 mi)
- Winning time: 15h 03' 24"

Results
Jersey awarded to the overall winner	Winner	Lisa Brennauer (GER)	(Velocio–SRAM)
	Second	Jolien D'Hoore (BEL)	(Wiggle–Honda)
	Third	Christine Majerus (LUX)	(Boels–Dolmans)
Jersey awarded to the points classification winner	Points	Lisa Brennauer (GER)	(Velocio–SRAM)
Jersey awarded to the mountains classification winner	Mountains	Melissa Hoskins (AUS)	(Orica–AIS)
Jersey awarded to the youth classification winner	Youth	Hannah Barnes (GBR)	(UnitedHealthcare)
	Team	Boels–Dolmans	

The 2015 Aviva Women's Tour was the second staging of The Women's Tour, a women's stage race held in the United Kingdom. It ran from 17 to 21 June 2015 and had a UCI rating of 2.1. As in 2014, the race consisted of 5 stages and ran through southern and eastern England. The race was won by German rider Lisa Brennauer of Velocio–SRAM.

== Teams ==
UCI Women's teams

Alé–Cipollini
Bigla Pro Cycling Team
Boels–Dolmans
Team Liv–Plantur
Lotto–Soudal Ladies
Matrix Fitness Pro Cycling
Orica–AIS
Optum–KBS
Poitou-Charentes.Futuroscope.86
Rabobank-Liv Woman Cycling Team
UnitedHealthcare
Velocio–SRAM
Wiggle–Honda

Non-UCI women's teams

Pearl Izumi Sports Tours International

National teams

Germany
United States

== Route ==
Stage	Date	Course	Distance	Type	Winner
1	17 June	Bury St Edmunds to Aldeburgh	112.6 km (70.0 mi)	Flat stage	Lizzie Armitstead (GBR)
2	18 June	Braintree to Clacton-on-Sea	138 km (85.7 mi)	Flat stage	Jolien D'Hoore (BEL)
3	19 June	Oundle to Kettering	139.2 km (86.5 mi)	Hilly stage	Christine Majerus (LUX)
4	20 June	Waltham Cross to Stevenage	103.8 km (64.5 mi)	Hilly stage	Lisa Brennauer (GER)
5	21 June	Marlow to Hemel Hempstead	102.6 km (63.8 mi)	Hilly stage	Hannah Barnes (GBR)
Total		596.2 km (370.5 mi)			

== Race summary ==
The defending champion, Marianne Vos, was unable to participate due to injury. The winner of the first stage, Lizzie Armitstead (Boels–Dolmans), was unable to participate further in the race after she crashed crossing the finishing line, sustaining a sprained wrist and heavy bruising. Lisa Brennauer (Velocio–SRAM) assumed the race lead after Armitstead's withdrawal, and after briefly losing the lead to Christine Majerus (Boels–Dolmans) on stage three, her stage win on stage 4 to allowed her to reassume the race lead which she held to the end of the race. As well as winning the overall classification, Brennauer also won the points classification. Jolien D'Hoore (Wiggle–Honda) finished second overall, with Majerus third.

== Jerseys ==
denotes the leader of the General classification, the rider with the overall lowest cumulative time
denotes the leader of the Mountains classification
denotes the leader of the Points classification
denotes the leader of the Young rider classification, the rider with the lowest cumulative time who is also under 23 years.
denotes the leader of the Best British rider classification, which is the British rider with the lowest cumulative time

== Stages ==
=== Stage 1 ===
17 June 2015 — Bury St Edmunds to Aldeburgh, 112.6 km (70.0 mi)

Stage 1 result

	Rider	Team	Time
1	Lizzie Armitstead (GBR)	Boels–Dolmans	2h 39' 53"
2	Lisa Brennauer (GER)	Velocio–SRAM	+ 0"
3	Emma Johansson (SWE)	Orica–AIS	+ 0"
4	Simona Frapporti (ITA)	Alé–Cipollini	+ 0"
5	Jolien D'Hoore (BEL)	Wiggle–Honda	+ 0"
6	Roxane Knetemann (NED)	Rabobank-Liv Woman Cycling Team	+ 0"
7	Pascale Jeuland (FRA)	Poitou-Charentes.Futuroscope.86	+ 0"
8	Alexis Ryan (USA)	UnitedHealthcare	+ 0"
9	Lotta Lepistö (FIN)	Bigla Pro Cycling Team	+ 0"
10	Aude Biannic (FRA)	Poitou-Charentes.Futuroscope.86	+ 0"

General classification after Stage 1

	Rider	Team	Time
1	Lizzie Armitstead (GBR)	Boels–Dolmans	2h 39' 43"
2	Lisa Brennauer (GER)	Velocio–SRAM	+ 4"
3	Marta Tagliaferro (ITA)	Alé–Cipollini	+ 5"
4	Emma Johansson (SWE)	Orica–AIS	+ 6"
5	Coryn Rivera (USA)	UnitedHealthcare	+ 6"
6	Elinor Barker (GBR)	Matrix Fitness Pro Cycling	+ 7"
7	Simona Frapporti (ITA)	Alé–Cipollini	+ 10"
8	Jolien D'Hoore (BEL)	Wiggle–Honda	+ 10"
9	Roxane Knetemann (NED)	Rabobank-Liv Woman Cycling Team	+ 10"
10	Pascale Jeuland (FRA)	Poitou-Charentes.Futuroscope.86	+ 10"

=== Stage 2 ===
18 June 2015 — Braintree to Clacton-on-Sea, 138 km (85.7 mi)

Stage 2 result

	Rider	Team	Time
1	Jolien D'Hoore (BEL)	Wiggle–Honda	3h 23' 25"
2	Lisa Brennauer (GER)	Velocio–SRAM	+ 0"
3	Christine Majerus (LUX)	Boels–Dolmans	+ 0"
4	Emma Johansson (SWE)	Orica–AIS	+ 0"
5	Anouska Koster (NED)	Rabobank-Liv Woman Cycling Team	+ 0"
6	Marta Tagliaferro (ITA)	Alé–Cipollini	+ 0"
7	Giorgia Bronzini (ITA)	Wiggle–Honda	+ 0"
8	Simona Frapporti (ITA)	Alé–Cipollini	+ 0"
9	Alexis Ryan (USA)	UnitedHealthcare	+ 0"
10	Lucy Garner (GBR)	Team Liv–Plantur	+ 0"

General classification after Stage 2

	Rider	Team	Time
1	Lisa Brennauer (GER)	Velocio–SRAM	6h 03' 06"
2	Jolien D'Hoore (BEL)	Wiggle–Honda	+ 1"
3	Vera Koedooder (NED)	Bigla Pro Cycling Team	+ 6"
4	Marta Tagliaferro (ITA)	Alé–Cipollini	+ 7"
5	Emma Johansson (SWE)	Orica–AIS	+ 8"
6	Christine Majerus (LUX)	Boels–Dolmans	+ 8"
7	Coryn Rivera (USA)	UnitedHealthcare	+ 8"
8	Corinna Lechner (GER)	Germany (national team)	+ 8"
9	Elinor Barker (GBR)	Matrix Fitness Pro Cycling	+ 9"
10	Hannah Barnes (GBR)	UnitedHealthcare	+ 11"

=== Stage 3 ===
19 June 2015 — Oundle to Kettering, 139.2 km (86.5 mi)

Stage 3 result

	Rider	Team	Time
1	Christine Majerus (LUX)	Boels–Dolmans	3h 43' 05"
2	Barbara Guarischi (ITA)	Velocio–SRAM	+ 2"
3	Lucy Garner (GBR)	Team Liv–Plantur	+ 2"
4	Hannah Barnes (GBR)	UnitedHealthcare	+ 2"
5	Emma Johansson (SWE)	Orica–AIS	+ 2"
6	Lisa Brennauer (GER)	Velocio–SRAM	+ 2"
7	Jolien D'Hoore (BEL)	Wiggle–Honda	+ 2"
8	Trixi Worrack (GER)	Velocio–SRAM	+ 5"
9	Amalie Dideriksen (DEN)	Boels–Dolmans	+ 5"
10	Simona Frapporti (ITA)	Alé–Cipollini	+ 5"

General classification after Stage 3

	Rider	Team	Time
1	Christine Majerus (LUX)	Boels–Dolmans	9h 46' 09"
2	Jolien D'Hoore (BEL)	Wiggle–Honda	+ 3"
3	Lisa Brennauer (GER)	Velocio–SRAM	+ 4"
4	Emma Johansson (SWE)	Orica–AIS	+ 9"
5	Barbara Guarischi (ITA)	Velocio–SRAM	+ 10"
6	Lucy Garner (GBR)	Team Liv–Plantur	+ 12"
7	Hannah Barnes (GBR)	UnitedHealthcare	+ 13"
8	Simona Frapporti (ITA)	Alé–Cipollini	+ 19"
9	Alexis Ryan (USA)	UnitedHealthcare	+ 19"
10	Pascale Jeuland (FRA)	Poitou-Charentes.Futuroscope.86	+ 19"

=== Stage 4 ===
20 June 2015 — Waltham Cross to Stevenage, 103.8 km (64.5 mi)

Stage 4 result

	Rider	Team	Time
1	Lisa Brennauer (GER)	Velocio–SRAM	2h 36' 35"
2	Emma Johansson (SWE)	Orica–AIS	+ 0"
3	Lotta Lepistö (FIN)	Bigla Pro Cycling Team	+ 0"
4	Christine Majerus (LUX)	Boels–Dolmans	+ 0"
5	Hannah Barnes (GBR)	UnitedHealthcare	+ 0"
6	Amalie Dideriksen (DEN)	Boels–Dolmans	+ 0"
7	Alexis Ryan (USA)	UnitedHealthcare	+ 0"
8	Sara Mustonen (SWE)	Team Liv–Plantur	+ 0"
9	Elisa Longo Borghini (ITA)	Wiggle–Honda	+ 0"
10	Sabrina Stultiens (NED)	Team Liv–Plantur	+ 0"

General classification after Stage 4

	Rider	Team	Time
1	Lisa Brennauer (GER)	Velocio–SRAM	12h 22' 35"
2	Christine Majerus (LUX)	Boels–Dolmans	+ 9"
3	Jolien D'Hoore (BEL)	Wiggle–Honda	+ 10"
4	Emma Johansson (SWE)	Orica–AIS	+ 11"
5	Hannah Barnes (GBR)	UnitedHealthcare	+ 22"
6	Alexis Ryan (USA)	UnitedHealthcare	+ 28"
7	Pascale Jeuland (FRA)	Poitou-Charentes.Futuroscope.86	+ 28"
8	Maria Giulia Confalonieri (ITA)	Alé–Cipollini	+ 28"
9	Susanna Zorzi (ITA)	Lotto–Soudal Ladies	+ 28"
10	Simona Frapporti (ITA)	Alé–Cipollini	+ 28"

=== Stage 5 ===
21 June 2015 — Marlow to Hemel Hempstead, 102.6 km (63.8 mi)

Stage 5 result

	Rider	Team	Time
1	Hannah Barnes (GBR)	UnitedHealthcare	2h 40' 51"
2	Jolien D'Hoore (BEL)	Wiggle–Honda	+ 0"
3	Simona Frapporti (ITA)	Alé–Cipollini	+ 0"
4	Lisa Brennauer (GER)	Velocio–SRAM	+ 0"
5	Christine Majerus (LUX)	Boels–Dolmans	+ 0"
6	Sara Mustonen (SWE)	Team Liv–Plantur	+ 0"
7	Emma Johansson (SWE)	Orica–AIS	+ 0"
8	Katie Archibald (GBR)	Pearl Izumi Sports Tours International	+ 0"
9	Maria Giulia Confalonieri (ITA)	Alé–Cipollini	+ 0"
10	Roxane Knetemann (NED)	Rabobank-Liv Woman Cycling Team	+ 0"

Final general classification

	Rider	Team	Time
1	Lisa Brennauer (GER)	Velocio–SRAM	15h 03' 24"
2	Jolien D'Hoore (BEL)	Wiggle–Honda	+ 6"
3	Christine Majerus (LUX)	Boels–Dolmans	+ 7"
4	Emma Johansson (SWE)	Orica–AIS	+ 13"
5	Hannah Barnes (GBR)	UnitedHealthcare	+ 14"
6	Simona Frapporti (ITA)	Alé–Cipollini	+ 26"
7	Leah Kirchmann (CAN)	Optum–KBS	+ 29"
8	Alexis Ryan (USA)	UnitedHealthcare	+ 30"
9	Pascale Jeuland (FRA)	Poitou-Charentes.Futuroscope.86	+ 30"
10	Maria Giulia Confalonieri (ITA)	Alé–Cipollini	+ 30"

== See also ==
- 2015 in women's road cycling
