= 2015 Omloop Het Nieuwsblad (women's race) =

Cycling race

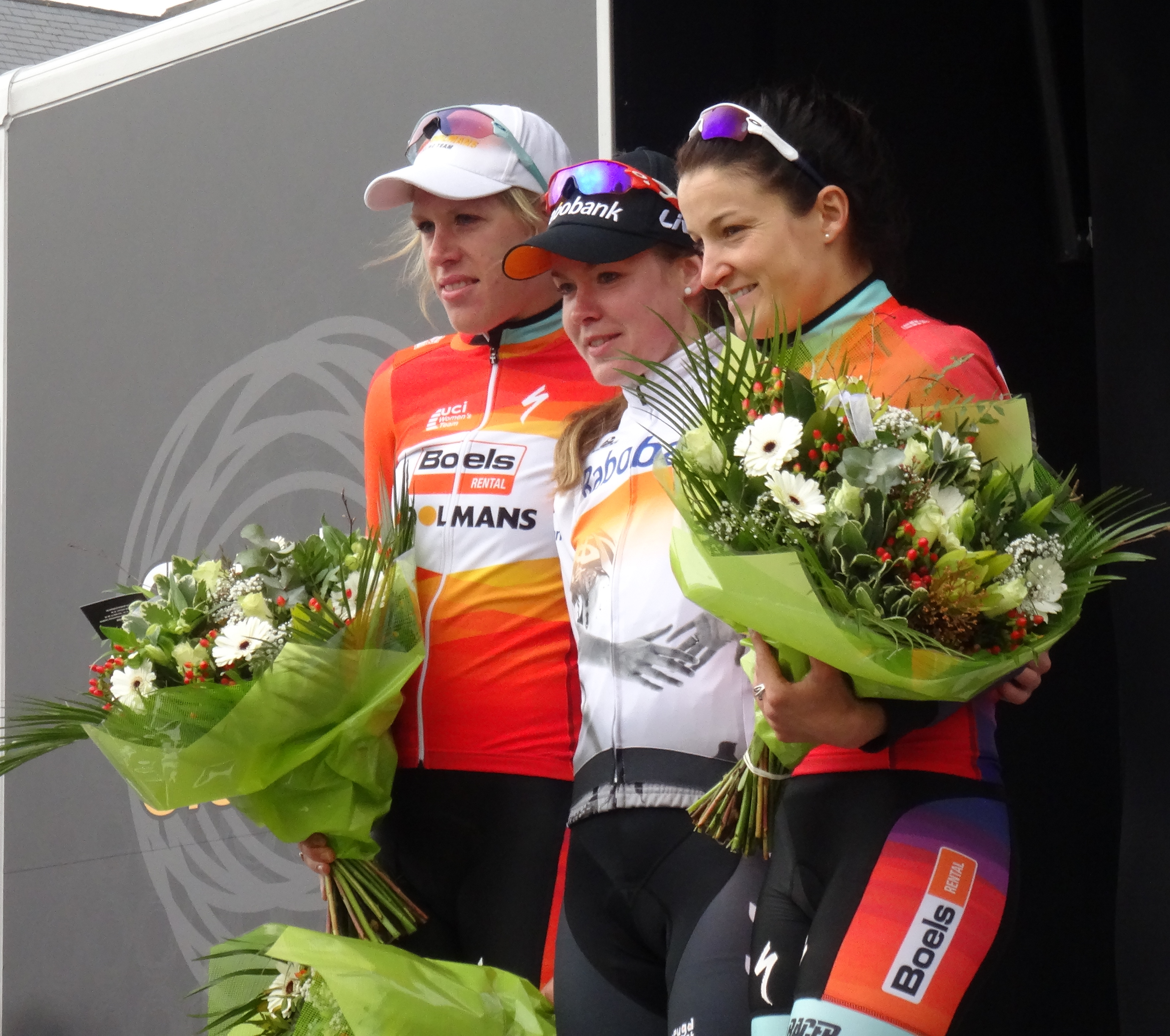
- Podium (left to right: Ellen van Dijk, Anna van der Breggen, Lizzie Armitstead)

Race details
- Dates: 28 February 2015
- Stages: 1
- Distance: 120.5 km (74.9 mi)

Results
	Winner	Anna van der Breggen (NED)	(Rabobank-Liv Woman Cycling Team)
	Second	Ellen van Dijk (NED)	(Boels–Dolmans)
	Third	Lizzie Armitstead (GBR)	(Boels–Dolmans)

The 2015 Omloop Het Nieuwsblad was the 10th edition of the women's Omloop Het Nieuwsblad road cycling one-day race which took place on 28 February. The race started and finished in Ghent, covering 120.5 kilometres (74.9 miles) in the province of East Flanders.

Dutch rider Anna van der Breggen won in a sprint from Ellen van Dijk.

== Teams ==
25 teams were confirmed for the race giving 200 riders in total.

=== UCI Women's Teams ===
- Alé–Cipollini
- BePink–La Classica
- Bigla Pro Cycling Team
- Boels–Dolmans
- Team Hitec Products
- Inpa Sottoli Giusfredi
- Lensworld.eu–Zannata
- Team Liv–Plantur
- Lointek
- Lotto–Soudal Ladies
- Matrix Fitness Pro Cycling
- Orica–AIS
- Parkhotel Valkenburg Continental Team
- Poitou-Charentes.Futuroscope.86
- Rabobank-Liv Woman Cycling Team
- Team Rytger
- Topsport Vlaanderen–Pro-Duo
- Velocio–SRAM
- Wiggle–Honda

=== National teams ===
- United States

=== Domestic teams ===
- Autoglas Wetteren
- Isorex
- Keukens Redant
- Napoleon Ladies
- Sprinters Malderen

== Race ==
After the first hour where the bunch remained together, there were several attacks with Boels–Dolmans dominating the race. With 30 kilometres (19 miles) to go Ellen van Dijk escaped from a front group of 15 riders on the Molenberg with Anna van der Breggen the only one who could follow her. The duo extended their advantage through the cobbled sections that followed, holding off the chase group to the line, where van Dijk lost the two-up sprint. Behind them Lizzie Armitstead sprinted to third place.

== Results ==
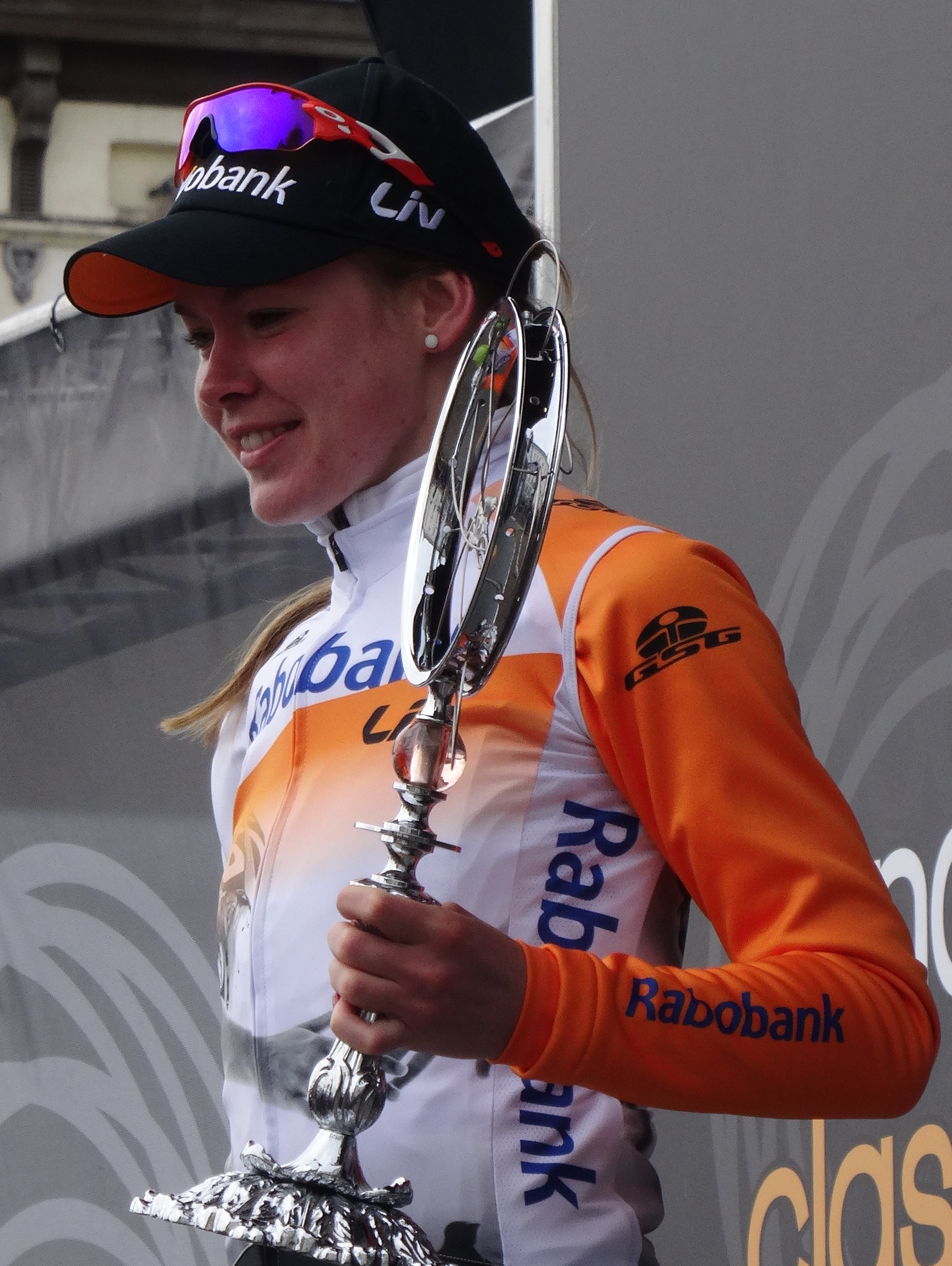
Race winner van der Breggen being honoured on the podium after the race

Final general classification
Rank	Rider	Team	Time
1	Anna van der Breggen (NED)	Rabobank-Liv Woman Cycling Team	3h 32' 16"
2	Ellen van Dijk (NED)	Boels–Dolmans	+ 0"
3	Lizzie Armitstead (GBR)	Boels–Dolmans	+ 14"
4	Chantal Blaak (NED)	Rabobank-Liv Woman Cycling Team	+ 14"
5	Tiffany Cromwell (AUS)	Velocio–SRAM	+ 14"
6	Elena Cecchini (ITA)	Lotto–Soudal Ladies	+ 14"
7	Amy Pieters (NED)	Team Liv–Plantur	+ 14"
8	Christine Majerus (LUX)	Boels–Dolmans	+ 14"
9	Trixi Worrack (GER)	Velocio–SRAM	+ 14"
10	Roxane Knetemann (NED)	Rabobank-Liv Woman Cycling Team	+ 14"
