= 2015 Ladies Tour of Qatar =

Race details
- Dates: 3–6 February
- Stages: 4
- Distance: 406 km (252 mi)
- Winning time: 9h 59' 25"

Results
Jersey awarded to the overall winner	Winner	Lizzie Armitstead (GBR)	(Boels–Dolmans)
	Second	Chloe Hosking (AUS)	(Wiggle–Honda)
	Third	Ellen van Dijk (NED)	(Boels–Dolmans)
Jersey awarded to the points classification winner	Points	Lizzie Armitstead (GBR)	(Boels–Dolmans)
Jersey awarded to the young rider classification winner	Young rider	Beatrice Bartelloni (ITA)	(Alé–Cipollini)
	Team	Wiggle–Honda	

The 2015 Ladies Tour of Qatar was the 7th edition of the Ladies Tour of Qatar. It was organised by the Qatar Cycling Federation with technical and sports-related assistance from Amaury Sport Organisation (A.S.O.) under the regulations of the Union Cycliste Internationale (category 2.1). It took place from Tuesday 3 February until Friday 6 February 2015 and consisted of 4 stages. 15 teams of 6 riders took part. The event was broadcast live by beIN Sports.

== Teams ==
15 teams were announced for the race on 27 January 2015.

- Orica–AIS
- Topsport Vlaanderen–Pro-Duo
- Velocio–SRAM
- Wiggle–Honda
- China Chongming–Liv–Champion System
- Alé–Cipollini
- Boels–Dolmans
- Rabobank-Liv Woman Cycling Team
- Team Liv–Plantur
- Team Hitec Products
- Bigla Pro Cycling Team
- Optum–KBS
- Australia
- France
- Italy

== Preview ==
The defending champion and winner of four of the six editions of the race, Kirsten Wild, did not start in the Ladies Tour of Qatar to prepare for the UCI Track Cycling World Championships. 2014 runner-up Amy Pieters took her place as leader of the Team Liv–Plantur squad. Former Tour of Qatar winner Ellen van Dijk and Lizzie Armitstead, who won the 2014 UCI World Cup and a gold medal at the Commonwealth Games led the reinforced Boels–Dolmans in the race. The Wiggle–Honda team sent Giorgia Bronzini, the former world champion and Chloe Hosking who had finished twice on the podium. Swedish Emma Johansson and Valentina Scandolara from Italy, winner of the Santos Women's Tour earlier in 2015, were part of the Orica–AIS squad. Shelley Olds led the Bigla Pro Cycling Team. Other important riders were Lucinda Brand and Shara Gillow heading up the Rabobank-Liv Woman Cycling Team and Tiffany Cromwell, Lisa Brennauer and Trixi Worrack with Velocio–SRAM.

== Stages ==
=== Stage 1 ===
3 February 2015 – Museum of Islamic Art to Dukhan Beach, 98.5 km (61.2 mi)

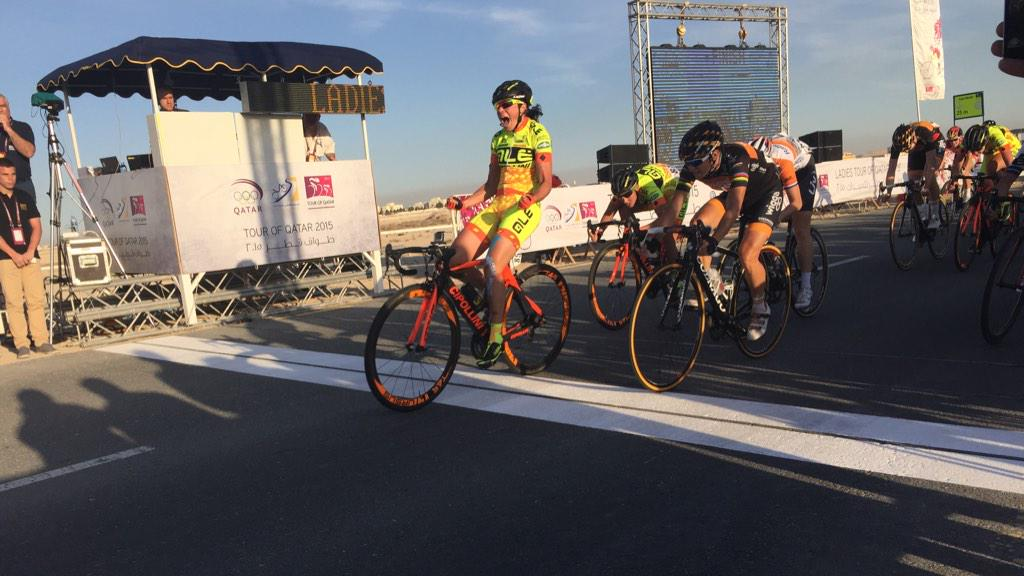
Cucinotta winning stage 1

With almost no wind, 87 riders started besides the Museum of Islamic Art in the centre of Doha. Without a breakaway, the pack remained bunched all the way to the first intermediate sprint at 28 kilometres (17 miles). After 37.5 kilometres (23.3 miles), Xiu Jie Jiang escaped. Her advantage went from 45 seconds at 42 kilometres (26 miles) to a maximum of 1' 20" at 61 kilometres (38 miles) and made it to the second bonus sprint after 68.5 kilometres (42.6 miles). Later she was caught by the bunch. On the last straight by the beach in Dukhan, Annalisa Cucinotta was led out by her teammates and won the stage ahead of two other Italian riders Giorgia Bronzini and Marta Tagliaferro. As well as wearing the golden leader's jersey, Cucinotta also led the points classification (silver Jersey). Another Italian rider Arianna Fidanza wore the white pearl jersey for the best young rider.

Stage 1 Result

	Rider	Team	Time
1	Annalisa Cucinotta (ITA)	Alé–Cipollini	2h 28' 36"
2	Giorgia Bronzini (ITA)	Wiggle–Honda	+ 0"
3	Marta Tagliaferro (ITA)	Alé–Cipollini	+ 0"
4	Lucinda Brand (NED)	Rabobank-Liv Woman Cycling Team	+ 0"
5	Shelley Olds (USA)	Bigla Pro Cycling Team	+ 0"
6	Trixi Worrack (GER)	Velocio–SRAM	+ 0"
7	Arianna Fidanza (ITA)	Alé–Cipollini	+ 0"
8	Jolien D'Hoore (BEL)	Wiggle–Honda	+ 0"
9	Kelly Druyts (BEL)	Topsport Vlaanderen–Pro-Duo	+ 0"
10	Tiffany Cromwell (AUS)	Velocio–SRAM	+ 0"

General Classification after Stage 1

	Rider	Team	Time
1	Annalisa Cucinotta (ITA)	Alé–Cipollini	2h 28' 26"
2	Giorgia Bronzini (ITA)	Wiggle–Honda	+ 4"
3	Shelley Olds (USA)	Bigla Pro Cycling Team	+ 5"
4	Marta Tagliaferro (ITA)	Alé–Cipollini	+ 6"
5	Lizzie Armitstead (GBR)	Boels–Dolmans	+ 8"
6	Chloe Hosking (AUS)	Wiggle–Honda	+ 8"
7	Lucinda Brand (NED)	Rabobank-Liv Woman Cycling Team	+ 10"
8	Trixi Worrack (GER)	Velocio–SRAM	+ 10"
9	Arianna Fidanza (ITA)	Alé–Cipollini	+ 10"
10	Jolien D'Hoore (BEL)	Wiggle–Honda	+ 10"

=== Stage 2 ===
4 February 2015 – Al Zubarah Fort to Madinat ash Shamal, 112.5 km (69.9 mi)

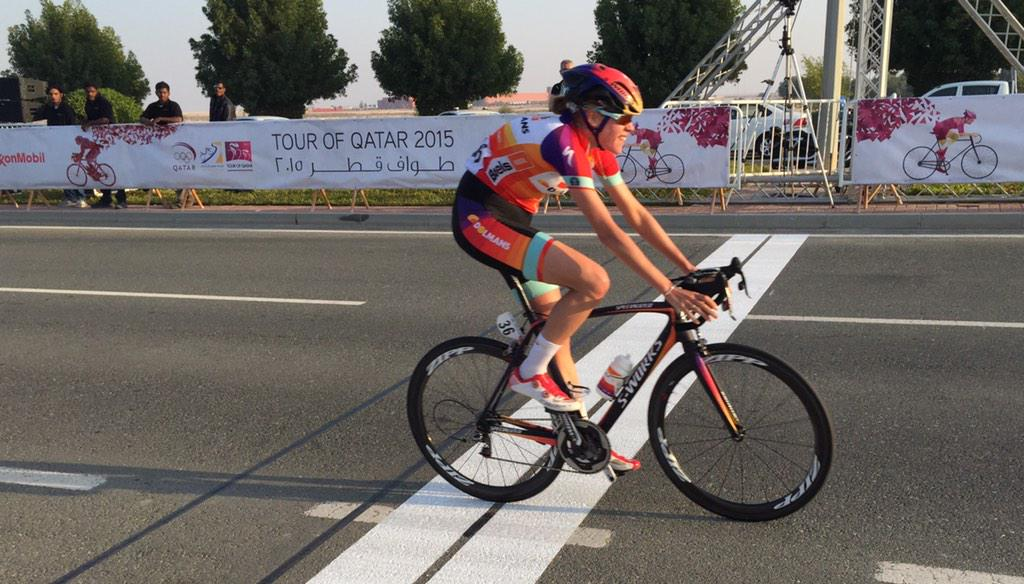
Ellen van Dijk winning stage 2

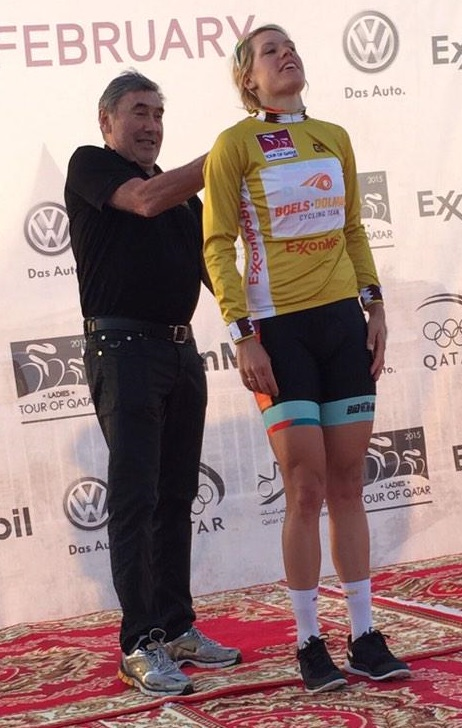
Ellen van Dijk in the leaders jersey

The 85 remaining riders took off for the longest stage of the event, 112.5 kilometres (69.9 miles) in length, heading north to Madinat ash Shamal. After 7 kilometres (4.3 miles) the bunch broke up into several groups under the due to cross winds. There was a front group of 16 cyclists and build up an advantage of 3 minutes. Six ladies pushed harder and pulled away: Chloe Hosking, Elisa Longo Borghini (both Wiggle–Honda), Emma Johansson (Orica–AIS), Lizzie Armitstead, Ellen van Dijk (both Boels–Dolmans) and Trixi Worrack (Velocio–SRAM). In the final 13.4-kilometre (8.3-mile) lap, despite an early solo attempt from van Dijk, the leaders stayed together. Counting on the presence of her teammate Armitstead, van Dijk gave it another go just after the final kilometre mark. Making the best of her power, she would not be caught and made it victoriously to the line for a second stage success in Qatar, by three seconds ahead of Worrack and Armitstead. Winner of the 2011 Ladies Tour of Qatar, van Dijk captured the overall leader's golden jersey by four seconds over Armitstead. The silver jersey also switched shoulders and went to Worrack while Beatrice Bartelloni claimed the Pearl White jersey for the best young rider.

Stage 2 Result

	Rider	Team	Time
1	Ellen van Dijk (NED)	Boels–Dolmans	2h 39' 21"
2	Trixi Worrack (GER)	Velocio–SRAM	+ 3"
3	Lizzie Armitstead (GBR)	Boels–Dolmans	+ 3"
4	Chloe Hosking (AUS)	Wiggle–Honda	+ 3"
5	Emma Johansson (SWE)	Orica–AIS	+ 3"
6	Elisa Longo Borghini (ITA)	Wiggle–Honda	+ 9"
7	Jolien D'Hoore (BEL)	Wiggle–Honda	+ 1' 57"
8	Valentina Scandolara (ITA)	Orica–AIS	+ 1' 57"
9	Amy Pieters (NED)	Team Liv–Plantur	+ 1' 57"
10	Tiffany Cromwell (AUS)	Velocio–SRAM	+ 1' 57"

General Classification after Stage 2

	Rider	Team	Time
1	Ellen van Dijk (NED)	Boels–Dolmans	5h 07' 47"
2	Lizzie Armitstead (GBR)	Boels–Dolmans	+ 4"
3	Trixi Worrack (GER)	Velocio–SRAM	+ 7"
4	Chloe Hosking (AUS)	Wiggle–Honda	+ 7"
5	Emma Johansson (SWE)	Orica–AIS	+ 10"
6	Elisa Longo Borghini (ITA)	Wiggle–Honda	+ 27"
7	Marta Tagliaferro (ITA)	Alé–Cipollini	+ 2' 01"
8	Jolien D'Hoore (BEL)	Wiggle–Honda	+ 2' 07"
9	Tiffany Cromwell (AUS)	Velocio–SRAM	+ 2' 07"
10	Gracie Elvin (AUS)	Orica–AIS	+ 2' 07"

=== Stage 3 ===
5 February 205 – Souq Waqif to Al Khor Corniche, 93.5 km (58.1 mi)

The 85 remaining riders took off for the 93.5-kilometre (58.1-mile) stage heading north. Alison Tetrick and Liu Yanan both tried to ride away from the pack in the opening kilometres but their solo efforts only lasted for a few kilometres. With 25 kilometres (16 miles) to go the main favourites rode away. Fourteen ladies gathered together at the front including seven of the top ten riders in the general classification. In the closing moments of the stage, despite the attempts of several riders, around thirty girls bunched up again with just under three kilometres to go. Helped out by her Boels Dolmans teammates, Lizzie Armitstead won the sprint of the group. With the time bonuses won at intermediate sprints and the finish, Armitstead took over the golden leader's jersey from her teammate Ellen van Dijk by eight seconds, with Chloe Hosking (Wiggle–Honda) a further second back.

Stage 3 Result

	Rider	Team	Time
1	Lizzie Armitstead (GBR)	Boels–Dolmans	2h 27' 45"
2	Shelley Olds (USA)	Bigla Pro Cycling Team	+ 0"
3	Lucinda Brand (NED)	Rabobank-Liv Woman Cycling Team	+ 0"
4	Chloe Hosking (AUS)	Wiggle–Honda	+ 0"
5	Pascale Jeuland (FRA)	France (national team)	+ 0"
6	Lauren Kitchen (AUS)	Team Hitec Products	+ 0"
7	Jolien D'Hoore (BEL)	Wiggle–Honda	+ 0"
8	Maria Giulia Confalonieri (ITA)	Alé–Cipollini	+ 0"
9	Emma Johansson (SWE)	Orica–AIS	+ 0"
10	Barbara Guarischi (ITA)	Velocio–SRAM	+ 0"

General Classification after Stage 3

	Rider	Team	Time
1	Lizzie Armitstead (GBR)	Boels–Dolmans	7h 35' 24"
2	Ellen van Dijk (NED)	Boels–Dolmans	+ 8"
3	Chloe Hosking (AUS)	Wiggle–Honda	+ 9"
4	Trixi Worrack (GER)	Velocio–SRAM	+ 15"
5	Emma Johansson (SWE)	Orica–AIS	+ 17"
6	Jolien D'Hoore (BEL)	Wiggle–Honda	+ 2' 14"
7	Tiffany Cromwell (AUS)	Velocio–SRAM	+ 2' 15"
8	Pascale Jeuland (FRA)	France (national team)	+ 2' 15"
9	Amy Pieters (NED)	Team Liv–Plantur	+ 2' 15"
10	Gracie Elvin (AUS)	Orica–AIS	+ 2' 23"

=== Stage 4 ===
6 February 2015 – Sealine Beach Resort to Doha Corniche, 101.5 km (63.1 mi)

Stage 4 Result

	Rider	Team	Time
1	Lizzie Armitstead (GBR)	Boels–Dolmans	2h 24' 15"
2	Chloe Hosking (AUS)	Wiggle–Honda	+ 0"
3	Barbara Guarischi (ITA)	Velocio–SRAM	+ 0"
4	Roxane Fournier (FRA)	France (national team)	+ 0"
5	Emma Johansson (SWE)	Orica–AIS	+ 0"
6	Lucinda Brand (NED)	Rabobank-Liv Woman Cycling Team	+ 0"
7	Kelly Druyts (BEL)	Topsport Vlaanderen–Pro-Duo	+ 0"
8	Elena Cecchini (ITA)	Italy (national team)	+ 0"
9	Pascale Jeuland (FRA)	France (national team)	+ 0"
10	Tiffany Cromwell (AUS)	Velocio–SRAM	+ 0"

Final General Classification

	Rider	Team	Time
1	Lizzie Armitstead (GBR)	Boels–Dolmans	9h 59' 25"
2	Chloe Hosking (AUS)	Wiggle–Honda	+ 12"
3	Ellen van Dijk (NED)	Boels–Dolmans	+ 22"
4	Trixi Worrack (GER)	Velocio–SRAM	+ 29"
5	Emma Johansson (SWE)	Orica–AIS	+ 30"
6	Jolien D'Hoore (BEL)	Wiggle–Honda	+ 2' 26"
7	Tiffany Cromwell (AUS)	Velocio–SRAM	+ 2' 29"
8	Pascale Jeuland (FRA)	France (national team)	+ 2' 29"
9	Amy Pieters (NED)	Team Liv–Plantur	+ 2' 29"
10	Gracie Elvin (AUS)	Orica–AIS	+ 2' 37"

== Classification leadership table ==
Stage	Winner	General classification	Points classification	Young rider classification	Teams classification
1	Annalisa Cucinotta	Annalisa Cucinotta	Annalisa Cucinotta	Arianna Fidanza	Alé–Cipollini
2	Ellen van Dijk	Ellen van Dijk	Trixi Worrack	Beatrice Bartelloni	Wiggle–Honda
3	Lizzie Armitstead	Lizzie Armitstead	Lizzie Armitstead	Beatrice Bartelloni	Wiggle–Honda
4	Lizzie Armitstead	Lizzie Armitstead	Lizzie Armitstead	Beatrice Bartelloni	Wiggle–Honda
Final		Lizzie Armitstead	Lizzie Armitstead	Beatrice Bartelloni	Wiggle–Honda

== Final classifications ==
=== General classification ===
General classification
	Rider	Team	Time
1	Lizzie Armitstead (GBR)	Boels–Dolmans	9h 59' 25"
2	Chloe Hosking (AUS)	Wiggle–Honda	+ 12"
3	Ellen van Dijk (NED)	Boels–Dolmans	+ 22"
4	Trixi Worrack (GER)	Velocio–SRAM	+ 29"
5	Emma Johansson (SWE)	Orica–AIS	+ 30"
6	Jolien D'Hoore (BEL)	Wiggle–Honda	+ 2' 26"
7	Tiffany Cromwell (AUS)	Velocio–SRAM	+ 2' 29"
8	Pascale Jeuland (FRA)	France (national team)	+ 2' 29"
9	Amy Pieters (NED)	Team Liv–Plantur	+ 2' 29"
10	Gracie Elvin (AUS)	Orica–AIS	+ 2' 37"

=== Points classification ===
Points classification
	Rider	Team	Points
1	Lizzie Armitstead (GBR)	Boels–Dolmans	50
2	Chloe Hosking (AUS)	Wiggle–Honda	43
3	Shelley Olds (USA)	Bigla Pro Cycling Team	23
4	Lucinda Brand (NED)	Rabobank-Liv Woman Cycling Team	21
5	Emma Johansson (SWE)	Orica–AIS	19
6	Trixi Worrack (GER)	Velocio–SRAM	17
7	Ellen van Dijk (NED)	Boels–Dolmans	15
8	Annalisa Cucinotta (ITA)	Alé–Cipollini	15
9	Jolien D'Hoore (BEL)	Wiggle–Honda	14
10	Giorgia Bronzini (ITA)	Wiggle–Honda	14

=== Teams classification ===
Team classification
	Team	Time
1	Wiggle–Honda	30h 02' 00"
2	Orica–AIS	+ 2' 04"
3	Boels–Dolmans	+ 9' 03"
4	Velocio–SRAM	+ 11' 00"
5	Alé–Cipollini	+ 15' 21"

== See also ==
- 2015 in women's road cycling
