= 2015 Energiewacht Tour =

Race details
- Dates: 8–12 April
- Stages: 6 (including prologue + 2 split stages)
- Distance: 458.6 km (285.0 mi)
- Winning time: 11h 30' 39"

Results
Jersey awarded to the overall winner	Winner	Lisa Brennauer (GER)	(Velocio–SRAM)
	Second	Trixi Worrack (GER)	(Velocio–SRAM)
	Third	Christine Majerus (LUX)	(Boels–Dolmans)
Jersey awarded to the points classification winner	Points	Kirsten Wild (NED)	(Team Hitec Products)
Jersey awarded to the young rider classification winner	Young rider	Anouska Koster (NED)	(Rabobank-Liv Woman Cycling Team)
Jersey awarded to the sprints classification winner	Sprints	Julia Soek (NED)	(Team Liv–Plantur)
	Team	Boels–Dolmans	

The 2015 Energiewacht Tour was the 5th edition of the Energiewacht Tour, a stage race primarily held in the Netherlands, with a UCI rating of 2.2, from 8 to 12 April. The last stage took place on the island of Borkum in Germany.

== Teams ==
A total of 22 teams participated in the race. Bigla Pro Cycling Team withdrew from the race in protest against the cost of the race entry fee.

UCI Women's Teams

- Boels–Dolmans
- Orica–AIS
- Team Hitec Products
- Team Liv–Plantur
- Parkhotel Valkenburg Continental Team
- Rabobank-Liv Woman Cycling Team
- Velocio–SRAM
- Wiggle–Honda
- Feminine Cycling Team

National teams

- Belgium
- Great Britain
- Germany
- Lithuania
- Switzerland
- United States

Club teams

- Jan van Arckel
- LST Euregio
- Team Maxx Solar
- Meteoor Assen–Roden Breda
- NWVG–Bathoorn Autoschade
- Swift–Avanti–Bollenstreek
- WV de Kannibaal–Ronald McDonald

== Stages ==
=== Prologue ===
8 April 2015 – Winsum to Winsum, 2.5 km (1.6 mi), individual time trial (ITT)

The main favourite for the prologue, the World Time Trial Champion Lisa Brennauer was beaten by 5 seconds by Anna van der Breggen. Brennauer said after her race, before Van der Breggen started, that she was pleased with her performance. Another favourite to win the prologue, the former World Time Trial Champion Ellen van Dijk had been ill for the last few days before the prologue and finished ninth, 10 seconds behind Van der Breggen.

Prologue result and general classification

Rank	Rider	Team	Time
1	Anna van der Breggen (NED)	Rabobank-Liv Woman Cycling Team	3' 15"
2	Lisa Brennauer (GER)	Velocio–SRAM	+ 5"
3	Trixi Worrack (GER)	Velocio–SRAM	+ 6"
4	Roxane Knetemann (NED)	Rabobank-Liv Woman Cycling Team	+ 6"
5	Christine Majerus (LUX)	Team SD Worx–Protime	+ 8"
6	Kirsten Wild (NED)	Team Hitec Products	+ 9"
7	Lucinda Brand (NED)	Rabobank-Liv Woman Cycling Team	+ 10"
8	Alena Amialiusik (BLR)	Velocio–SRAM	+ 10"
9	Ellen van Dijk (NED)	Boels–Dolmans	+ 10"
10	Jolien D'Hoore (BEL)	Wiggle–Honda	+ 10"

=== Stage 1 ===
9 April 2015 – Wedde to Ter Apel, 109.2 km (67.9 mi)

Stage 1 result

Rank	Rider	Team	Time
1	Jolien D'Hoore (BEL)	Wiggle–Honda	2h 46' 59"
2	Barbara Guarischi (ITA)	Velocio–SRAM	+ 0"
3	Trixi Worrack (GER)	Velocio–SRAM	+ 0"
4	Lucinda Brand (NED)	Rabobank-Liv Woman Cycling Team	+ 0"
5	Anna van der Breggen (NED)	Rabobank-Liv Woman Cycling Team	+ 0"
6	Kirsten Wild (NED)	Team Hitec Products	+ 0"
7	Christine Majerus (LUX)	Boels–Dolmans	+ 0"
8	Chloe Hosking (AUS)	Wiggle–Honda	+ 0"
9	Lucy Garner (GBR)	Team Liv–Plantur	+ 0"
10	Melissa Hoskins (AUS)	Orica–AIS	+ 0"

General classification after stage 1

Rank	Rider	Team	Time
1	Anna van der Breggen (NED)	Rabobank-Liv Woman Cycling Team	2h 50' 14"
2	Jolien D'Hoore (BEL)	Wiggle–Honda	+ 0"
3	Trixi Worrack (GER)	Velocio–SRAM	+ 2"
4	Barbara Guarischi (ITA)	Velocio–SRAM	+ 4"
5	Lisa Brennauer (GER)	Velocio–SRAM	+ 5"
6	Roxane Knetemann (NED)	Rabobank-Liv Woman Cycling Team	+ 6"
7	Christine Majerus (LUX)	Boels–Dolmans	+ 7"
8	Kirsten Wild (NED)	Team Hitec Products	+ 9"
9	Lucinda Brand (NED)	Rabobank-Liv Woman Cycling Team	+ 10"
10	Alena Amialiusik (BLR)	Velocio–SRAM	+ 10"

=== Stage 2a ===
10 April 2015 – Peize to Peize, 14.4 km (8.9 mi), team time trial (TTT)

Stage 2a result

Rank	Team	Time
1	Velocio–SRAM	17' 59"
2	Boels–Dolmans	+ 14"
3	Rabobank-Liv Woman Cycling Team	+ 30"
4	Orica–AIS	+ 34"
5	Team Hitec Products	+ 1' 00"
6	Team Liv–Plantur	+ 1' 09"
7	Parkhotel Valkenburg Continental Team	+ 1' 20"
8	United States (national team)	+ 1' 23"
9	Wiggle–Honda	+ 1' 41"
10	Feminine Cycling Team	+ 1' 55"

General classification after stage 2a

Rank	Rider	Team	Time
1	Trixi Worrack (GER)	Velocio–SRAM	3h 08' 15"
2	Barbara Guarischi (ITA)	Velocio–SRAM	+ 2"
3	Lisa Brennauer (GER)	Velocio–SRAM	+ 3"
4	Alena Amialiusik (BLR)	Velocio–SRAM	+ 8"
5	Tiffany Cromwell (AUS)	Velocio–SRAM	+ 12"
6	Christine Majerus (LUX)	Boels–Dolmans	+ 19"
7	Ellen van Dijk (NED)	Boels–Dolmans	+ 22"
8	Chantal Blaak (NED)	Boels–Dolmans	+ 23"
9	Lizzie Armitstead (GBR)	Boels–Dolmans	+ 24"
10	Anna van der Breggen (NED)	Rabobank-Liv Woman Cycling Team	+ 28"

=== Stage 2b ===
10 April 2015 – Leek to Zuidhorn, 110.2 km (68.5 mi)

Stage 2b result

Rank	Rider	Team	Time
1	Lucinda Brand (NED)	Rabobank-Liv Woman Cycling Team	2h 43' 58"
2	Kirsten Wild (NED)	Team Hitec Products	+ 0"
3	Christine Majerus (LUX)	Boels–Dolmans	+ 0"
4	Jolien D'Hoore (BEL)	Wiggle–Honda	+ 0"
5	Barbara Guarischi (ITA)	Velocio–SRAM	+ 0"
6	Lotte Kopecky (BEL)	Belgium (national team)	+ 3"
7	Ellen van Dijk (NED)	Boels–Dolmans	+ 3"
8	Trixi Worrack (GER)	Velocio–SRAM	+ 3"
9	Sara Mustonen (SWE)	Team Liv–Plantur	+ 3"
10	Chloe Hosking (AUS)	Wiggle–Honda	+ 3"

General classification after stage 2b

Rank	Rider	Team	Time
1	Barbara Guarischi (ITA)	Velocio–SRAM	5h 52' 15"
2	Trixi Worrack (GER)	Velocio–SRAM	+ 1"
3	Lisa Brennauer (GER)	Velocio–SRAM	+ 4"
4	Alena Amialiusik (BLR)	Velocio–SRAM	+ 9"
5	Tiffany Cromwell (AUS)	Velocio–SRAM	+ 13"
6	Christine Majerus (LUX)	Boels–Dolmans	+ 15"
7	Ellen van Dijk (NED)	Boels–Dolmans	+ 23"
8	Chantal Blaak (NED)	Boels–Dolmans	+ 24"
9	Lizzie Armitstead (GBR)	Boels–Dolmans	+ 25"
10	Anna van der Breggen (NED)	Rabobank-Liv Woman Cycling Team	+ 29"

=== Stage 3 ===
11 April 2015 – Stadskanaal to Stadskanaal, 116.9 km (72.6 mi)

Stage 3 result

Rank	Rider	Team	Time
1	Kirsten Wild (NED)	Team Hitec Products	2h 57' 31"
2	Lucinda Brand (NED)	Rabobank-Liv Woman Cycling Team	+ 0"
3	Lisa Brennauer (GER)	Velocio–SRAM	+ 0"
4	Lizzie Armitstead (GBR)	Boels–Dolmans	+ 0"
5	Jolien D'Hoore (BEL)	Wiggle–Honda	+ 0"
6	Trixi Worrack (GER)	Velocio–SRAM	+ 0"
7	Christine Majerus (LUX)	Boels–Dolmans	+ 0"
8	Ellen van Dijk (NED)	Boels–Dolmans	+ 0"
9	Anouska Koster (NED)	Rabobank-Liv Woman Cycling Team	+ 2' 16"
10	Gracie Elvin (AUS)	Orica–AIS	+ 2' 16"

General classification after stage 3

Rank	Rider	Team	Time
1	Lisa Brennauer (GER)	Velocio–SRAM	8h 49' 45"
2	Trixi Worrack (GER)	Velocio–SRAM	+ 1"
3	Christine Majerus (LUX)	Boels–Dolmans	+ 10"
4	Lucinda Brand (NED)	Rabobank-Liv Woman Cycling Team	+ 23"
5	Ellen van Dijk (NED)	Boels–Dolmans	+ 24"
6	Lizzie Armitstead (GBR)	Boels–Dolmans	+ 24"
7	Kirsten Wild (NED)	Team Hitec Products	+ 52"
8	Jolien D'Hoore (BEL)	Wiggle–Honda	+ 1' 38"
9	Barbara Guarischi (ITA)	Velocio–SRAM	+ 2' 17"
10	Alena Amialiusik (BLR)	Velocio–SRAM	+ 2' 26"

=== Stage 4 ===
12 April 2015 – Borkum to Borkum, 105.4 km (65.5 mi)

Stage 4 result

Rank	Rider	Team	Time
1	Anna van der Breggen (NED)	Rabobank-Liv Woman Cycling Team	2h 39' 42"
2	Jolien D'Hoore (BEL)	Wiggle–Honda	+ 1' 07"
3	Kirsten Wild (NED)	Team Hitec Products	+ 1' 07"
4	Lisa Brennauer (GER)	Velocio–SRAM	+ 1' 07"
5	Christine Majerus (LUX)	Boels–Dolmans	+ 1' 07"
6	Trixi Worrack (GER)	Velocio–SRAM	+ 1' 10"
7	Lucinda Brand (NED)	Rabobank-Liv Woman Cycling Team	+ 1' 12"
8	Roxane Knetemann (NED)	Rabobank-Liv Woman Cycling Team	+ 1' 14"
9	Chantal Blaak (NED)	Boels–Dolmans	+ 1' 40"
10	Janneke Ensing (NED)	Parkhotel Valkenburg Continental Team	+ 1' 40"

Final general classification

Rank	Rider	Team	Time
1	Lisa Brennauer (GER)	Velocio–SRAM	11h 30' 29"
2	Trixi Worrack (GER)	Velocio–SRAM	+ 9"
3	Christine Majerus (LUX)	Boels–Dolmans	+ 9"
4	Lucinda Brand (NED)	Rabobank-Liv Woman Cycling Team	+ 29"
5	Kirsten Wild (NED)	Team Hitec Products	+ 53"
6	Ellen van Dijk (NED)	Boels–Dolmans	+ 1' 02"
7	Anna van der Breggen (NED)	Rabobank-Liv Woman Cycling Team	+ 1' 31"
8	Jolien D'Hoore (BEL)	Wiggle–Honda	+ 1' 37"
9	Roxane Knetemann (NED)	Rabobank-Liv Woman Cycling Team	+ 3' 04"
10	Tiffany Cromwell (AUS)	Velocio–SRAM	+ 3' 08"

== Classification leadership table ==
denotes the rider with the lowest accumulated time and is the overall race leader
denotes the leader of the Points classification
denotes the leader of the Sprint classification
denotes the leader of the Combativity classification
denotes rider with the lowest accumulated time, who is under a specified age and leader of the Youth classification
denotes the leader of the Club rider classification, which consists of the rider with the best overall time from a non-UCI Women's team

Classification leadership by stage
Stage	Winner	General classification	Points classification	Sprint classification	Young rider classification	Combativity classification	Best Club rider classification	Team classification
P	Anna van der Breggen	Anna van der Breggen	Anna van der Breggen	Roxane Knetemann	Anouska Koster	no award	Trieneke Fokkens	Rabobank-Liv Woman Cycling Team
1	Jolien D'Hoore	Anna van der Breggen	Anna van der Breggen	Marijn de Vries	Anouska Koster	Winanda Spoor	Winanda Spoor	Rabobank-Liv Woman Cycling Team
2a	Velocio–SRAM	Trixi Worrack	Anna van der Breggen	Marijn de Vries	Anouska Koster	no award	Leonie Lubbinge	Velocio–SRAM
2b	Lucinda Brand	Barbara Guarischi	Lucinda Brand	Marijn de Vries	Anouska Koster	Lauren Hall	Leonie Lubbinge	Velocio–SRAM
3	Kirsten Wild	Lisa Brennauer	Lucinda Brand	Julia Soek	Anouska Koster	Lizzie Armitstead	Leonie Lubbinge	Boels–Dolmans
4	Anna van der Breggen	Lisa Brennauer	Kirsten Wild	Julia Soek	Anouska Koster	Anna van der Breggen	Winanda Spoor	Boels–Dolmans
Final		Lisa Brennauer	Kirsten Wild	Julia Soek	Anouska Koster	Anna van der Breggen	Winanda Spoor	Boels–Dolmans

== See also ==
- 2015 in women's road cycling
