= 2015 Ronde van Drenthe World Cup =

2015 UCI Women's Road World Cup, race 1

Race details
- Dates: 14 March 2015
- Stages: 1
- Distance: 138.3 km (85.9 mi)
- Winning time: 3h 33' 34"

Results
	Winner	Jolien D'Hoore (BEL)	(Wiggle–Honda)
	Second	Amy Pieters (NED)	(Team Liv–Plantur)
	Third	Ellen van Dijk (NED)	(Boels–Dolmans)

The 2015 Ronde van Drenthe World Cup was the 9th running of the Ronde van Drenthe World Cup, a women's bicycle race in the Netherlands. It was the first race of the 2015 UCI Women's Road World Cup and was held on 14 March 2015 over a distance of 138.3 kilometres (85.9 miles), starting and finishing in Hoogeveen. The race was won by Jolien D'Hoore (Wiggle–Honda) in a sprint finish, ahead of Amy Pieters (Team Liv–Plantur) and Ellen van Dijk (Boels–Dolmans).

== Results ==
=== Race result ===
Result
Rank	Rider	Team	Time
1	Jolien D'Hoore (BEL)	Wiggle–Honda	3h 33' 34"
2	Amy Pieters (NED)	Team Liv–Plantur	+ 0"
3	Ellen van Dijk (NED)	Boels–Dolmans	+ 0"
4	Lucinda Brand (NED)	Rabobank-Liv Woman Cycling Team	+ 0"
5	Chloe Hosking (AUS)	Wiggle–Honda	+ 0"
6	Tiffany Cromwell (AUS)	Velocio–SRAM	+ 0"
7	Lizzie Armitstead (GBR)	Boels–Dolmans	+ 3"
8	Emma Johansson (SWE)	Orica–AIS	+ 3"
9	Marta Tagliaferro (ITA)	Alé–Cipollini	+ 3"
10	Barbara Guarischi (ITA)	Velocio–SRAM	+ 3"

=== World Cup standings ===
World Cup standings after 1 of 10 races
Rank	Rider	Team	Points
1	Jolien D'Hoore (BEL)	Wiggle–Honda	120
2	Amy Pieters (NED)	Team Liv–Plantur	100
3	Ellen van Dijk (NED)	Boels–Dolmans	85
4	Lucinda Brand (NED)	Rabobank-Liv Woman Cycling Team	70
5	Chloe Hosking (AUS)	Wiggle–Honda	60
6	Tiffany Cromwell (AUS)	Velocio–SRAM	50
7	Lizzie Armitstead (GBR)	Boels–Dolmans	40
8	Emma Johansson (SWE)	Orica–AIS	35
9	Marta Tagliaferro (ITA)	Alé–Cipollini	30
10	Barbara Guarischi (ITA)	Velocio–SRAM	25

== See also ==
- 2015 in women's road cycling
