= 2015 Ladies Tour of Norway =

Race details
- Dates: 14–16 August 2015
- Stages: 3
- Winning time: 5h 56' 11"

Results
| | Winner | Megan Guarnier (USA) |
| | Second | Shelley Olds (USA) |
| | Third | Amanda Spratt (AUS) |
| | Points | Shelley Olds (USA) |
| | Mountains | Evelyn Stevens (USA) |
| | Youth | Amalie Dideriksen (DEN) |
| | Team | Boels–Dolmans |

The 2015 Ladies Tour of Norway was the second edition of the Ladies Tour of Norway, a women's cycling stage race in Norway. It was rated by the UCI as a category 2.2 race. It was won by Megan Guarnier of Boels–Dolmans.

== Route ==
Stage characteristics and winners
| Stage | Date | Course | Distance | Type | Stage winner |
|---|---|---|---|---|---|
| Criterium | 14 August | Halden | 28 km (17 mi) | Flat stage | Shelley Olds (USA) |
| 1 | 15 August | Strömstad to Halden | 114.6 km (71.2 mi) | Flat stage | Megan Guarnier (USA) |
| 2 | 16 August | Svinesund to Halden | 115.6 km (71.8 mi) | Flat stage | Shelley Olds (USA) |

== Stages ==
=== Criterium 350 (not part of the Tour) ===
14 August 2015 – Halden to Halden, 28 km (17.4 mi)

Criterium 350 result

| Rank | Rider | Team | Time |
|---|---|---|---|
| 1 | Shelley Olds (USA) | Alé–Cipollini | 39' 21" |
| 2 | Emma Johansson (SWE) | Orica–AIS | s.t. |
| 3 | Katarzyna Pawłowska (POL) | Boels–Dolmans | s.t. |
| 4 | Jeanne Korevaar (NED) | Rabobank-Liv Woman Cycling Team | s.t. |
| 5 | Valentina Scandolara (ITA) | Orica–AIS | + 1' 00" |
| 6 | Amalie Dideriksen (DEN) | Boels–Dolmans | s.t. |
| 7 | Camilla Møllebro (DEN) | Team BMS BIRN | s.t. |
| 8 | Emilia Fahlin (SWE) | Sweden | s.t. |
| 9 | Sara Mustonen (SWE) | Sweden | s.t. |
| 10 | Maria Giulia Confalonieri (ITA) | Alé–Cipollini | s.t. |

=== Stage 1 ===
15 August 2015 – Strömstad to Halden, 112 km (69.6 mi)

Stage 1 result

| Rank | Rider | Team | Time |
|---|---|---|---|
| 1 | Megan Guarnier (USA) | Boels–Dolmans | 3h 02' 08" |
| 2 | Amanda Spratt (AUS) | Orica–AIS | + 1" |
| 3 | Valentina Scandolara (ITA) | Orica–AIS | + 8" |
| 4 | Shelley Olds (USA) | Alé–Cipollini | s.t. |
| 5 | Emilia Fahlin (SWE) | Sweden | s.t. |
| 6 | Emma Johansson (SWE) | Orica–AIS | s.t. |
| 7 | Charlotte Becker (GER) | Team Hitec Products | s.t. |
| 8 | Christine Majerus (LUX) | Boels–Dolmans | s.t. |
| 9 | Tatiana Guderzo (ITA) | Team Hitec Products | s.t. |
| 10 | Amalie Dideriksen (DEN) | Boels–Dolmans | s.t. |

General classification after Stage 1

| Rank | Rider | Team | Time |
|---|---|---|---|
| 1 | Megan Guarnier (USA) | Boels–Dolmans | 3h 01' 55" |
| 2 | Amanda Spratt (AUS) | Orica–AIS | + 6" |
| 3 | Valentina Scandolara (ITA) | Orica–AIS | + 14" |
| 4 | Christine Majerus (LUX) | Boels–Dolmans | + 19" |
| 5 | Shelley Olds (USA) | Alé–Cipollini | + 21" |
| 6 | Emilia Fahlin (SWE) | Sweden | s.t. |
| 7 | Emma Johansson (SWE) | Orica–AIS | s.t. |
| 8 | Charlotte Becker (GER) | Team Hitec Products | s.t. |
| 9 | Tatiana Guderzo (ITA) | Team Hitec Products | s.t. |
| 10 | Amalie Dideriksen (DEN) | Boels–Dolmans | s.t. |

=== Stage 2 ===
16 August 2015 – Halden to Halden, 109.6 km (68.1 mi)

Stage 2 result

| Rank | Rider | Team | Time |
|---|---|---|---|
| 1 | Shelley Olds (USA) | Alé–Cipollini | 2h 54' 16" |
| 2 | Anna van der Breggen (NED) | Rabobank-Liv Woman Cycling Team | s.t. |
| 3 | Emilie Moberg (NOR) | Team Hitec Products | s.t. |
| 4 | Emma Johansson (SWE) | Orica–AIS | s.t. |
| 5 | Lizzie Williams (AUS) | Orica–AIS | s.t. |
| 6 | Tatiana Guderzo (ITA) | Team Hitec Products | s.t. |
| 7 | Sara Mustonen (SWE) | Sweden | s.t. |
| 8 | Megan Guarnier (USA) | Boels–Dolmans | s.t. |
| 9 | Joëlle Numainville (CAN) | Bigla Pro Cycling Team | s.t. |
| 10 | Christine Majerus (LUX) | Boels–Dolmans | s.t. |

General classification after Stage 2

| Rank | Rider | Team | Time |
|---|---|---|---|
| 1 | Megan Guarnier (USA) | Boels–Dolmans | 5h 56' 11" |
| 2 | Shelley Olds (USA) | Alé–Cipollini | + 5" |
| 3 | Amanda Spratt (AUS) | Orica–AIS | + 6" |
| 4 | Valentina Scandolara (ITA) | Orica–AIS | + 11" |
| 5 | Anna van der Breggen (NED) | Rabobank-Liv Woman Cycling Team | + 15" |
| 6 | Christine Majerus (LUX) | Boels–Dolmans | + 16" |
| 7 | Emma Johansson (SWE) | Orica–AIS | + 21" |
| 8 | Tatiana Guderzo (ITA) | Team Hitec Products | s.t. |
| 9 | Lizzie Williams (AUS) | Orica–AIS | s.t. |
| 10 | Charlotte Becker (GER) | Team Hitec Products | s.t. |

== Classification leadership ==
| Stage | Winner | General classification | Points classification | Mountains classification | Young rider classification | Team classification |
|---|---|---|---|---|---|---|
| 1 | Megan Guarnier | Megan Guarnier | Megan Guarnier | Megan Guarnier | Amalie Dideriksen | Boels–Dolmans |
| 2 | Shelley Olds | Megan Guarnier | Shelley Olds | Evelyn Stevens | Amalie Dideriksen | Boels–Dolmans |
| Final | | Megan Guarnier | Shelley Olds | Evelyn Stevens | Amalie Dideriksen | Boels–Dolmans |

== See also ==
- 2015 in women's road cycling
