= 2015 Boels–Dolmans season =

2015 Boels–Dolmans Cycling Team
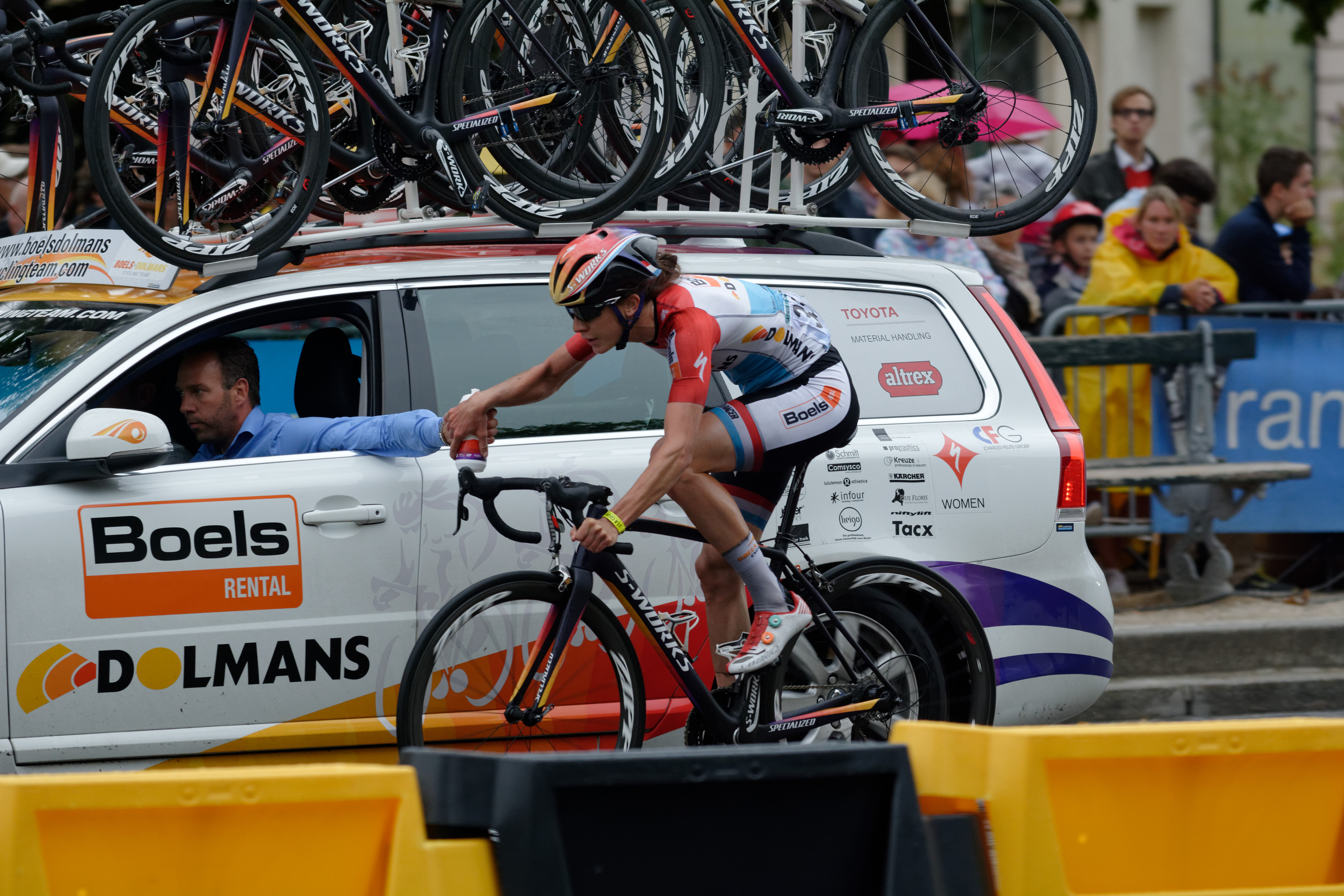
- UCI code: DLT
- Manager: Erwin Janssen
- Main sponsor(s): Boels Rental and Dolmans Landscaping
- Based: Netherlands
- Bicycles: Specialized

Season victories
- One-day races: 4
- Stage race overall: 2
- Stage race stages: 10
- World Championships: 1
- National Championships: 5

The 2015 women's road cycling season was the sixth for the Boels–Dolmans team, which began as the Dolmans Landscaping Team in 2010.

== Sponsoring ==
For the 2015 season, both Specialized Bicycle Components and lululemon Athletica announced that they were ending their sponsorship of the already existing Specialized–lululemon team and switching their support to Boels–Dolmans for 2015.

== Roster ==
In September 2014 it was announced that Chantal Blaak and Evelyn Stevens, both of Specialized–lululemon, would be joining the team with Romy Kasper signing a contract extension. On 27 October 2014 the team signed Amalie Dideriksen.

As of 1 January 2015. Ages as of 1 January 2015.

Rider	Date of birth
Lizzie Deignan (GBR)	December 18, 1988 (aged 26)
Chantal Blaak (NED)	October 22, 1989 (aged 25)
Amalie Dideriksen (DEN)	May 24, 1996 (aged 18)
Ellen van Dijk (NED)	February 11, 1987 (aged 27)
Megan Guarnier (USA)	May 4, 1985 (aged 29)
Demi de Jong (NED)	February 11, 1995 (aged 19)

Rider	Date of birth
Sanne van Paassen (NED)	October 27, 1988 (aged 26)
Romy Kasper (GER)	May 5, 1988 (aged 26)
Christine Majerus (LUX)	February 25, 1987 (aged 27)
Katarzyna Pawłowska (POL)	August 16, 1989 (aged 25)
Evelyn Stevens (USA)	May 9, 1983 (aged 31)

Riders who joined the team for the 2015 season

Rider	2014 team
Chantal Blaak (NED)	Specialized–lululemon
Evelyn Stevens (USA)	Specialized–lululemon
Amalie Dideriksen (DEN)	Former junior rider

Riders who left the team during or after the 2014 season

Rider	2015 team
Marieke van Wanroij (NED)	Retired
Nicky Zijlaard (NED)	Swaboladies.nl
Janneke Ensing (NED)	Parkhotel Valkenburg Continental Team
Jessie Daams (BEL)	Lotto Soudal Ladies
Nina Kessler (NED)	Lensworld–Zannata
Emma Trott (GBR)	Retired

== Season ==
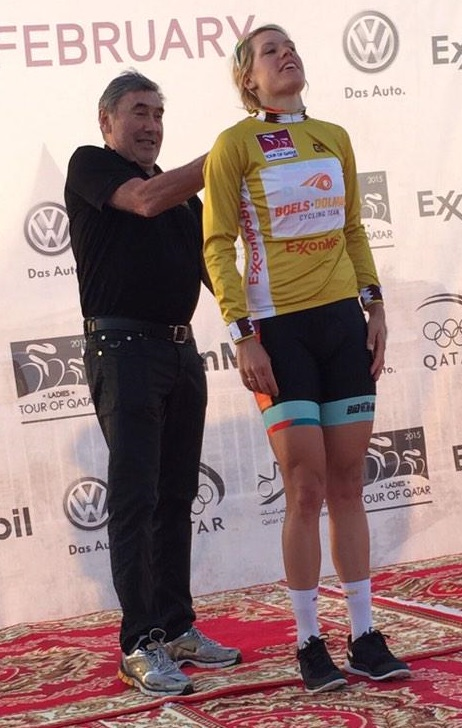
Ellen van Dijk in the leading jersey of the 2015 Ladies Tour of Qatar

The team started the road cycling season with the Ladies Tour of Qatar. Ellen van Dijk won the second stage by sprinting away in the last kilometre from a group of six. With her victory she also took the lead in the general classification. The day afterwards Lizzie Armitstead won the stage and took over the leading jersey from Van Dijk. In the first European race of the season, the Omloop het Nieuwsblad, the team was again very strong and dominated the race. With 30 km to go van Dijk escaped together with Anna van der Breggen from a front group of 15 riders on the Molenberg. The duo extended their advantage over the cobbled sections that followed, holding off the chase group to the line, where Van Dijk lost the two-up sprint. Behind them Armitstead sprinted to the third place. At the 2015 Le Samyn des Dames Megan Guarnier was in a front group of six riders, but she expected not to win. In the final 4 kilometers after the last cobbled section Ellen van Dijk started chasing the front group at the head of the peloton and was able to close the gap. She also was a good lead-out for Chantal Blaak who won the peloton sprint. In the first World Cup of the season, the Ronde van Drenthe the team was eager to win. Van Dijk was in the final the lead-out for Armitstead. However, Armitstead lost Van Dijk in the last kilometre. Van Dijk continued sprinting and rode to the third place. Van Dijk said afterwards that she was happy with her result, but found it a shame that the team did not win. In the second World Cup, the Trofeo Alfredo Binda was in the final Armitstead was part of the front group of six riders. Armitstead won the sprint, winning the first World Cup race for the team of the season.

Ellen van Dijk was selected to represent the Netherlands at the first 2015 European Games in the time trial and the road race in Baku, Azerbaijan in June. The time trial was her big goal and she was the favorite to win it. With a good race over the straight circuit she was 36 seconds faster than the Ukrainian Hanna Solovey and won the first gold medal for the Netherlands. In the road race she was part of front group of four riders, together with countrywomen Anna van der Breggen. During the last lap it appeared that Van der Breggen rode for her Polish Rabobank-Liv Woman Cycling Team teammate Katarzyna Niewiadoma and not for the Netherlands. Van Dijk was the brunt of these tactics and finished fourth.

== Season victories ==
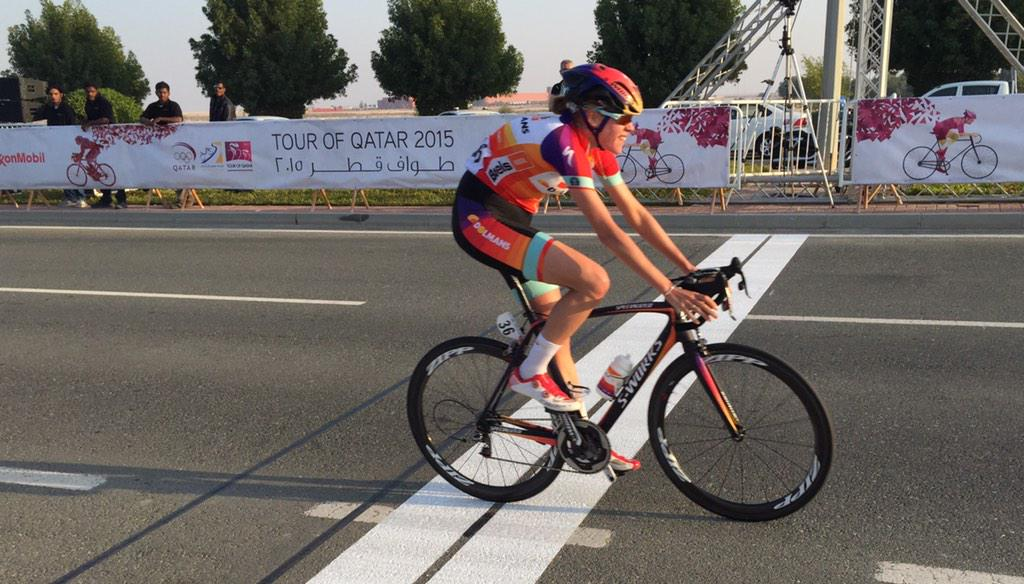
Ellen van Dijk winning stage 2 of the Ladies Tour of Qatar

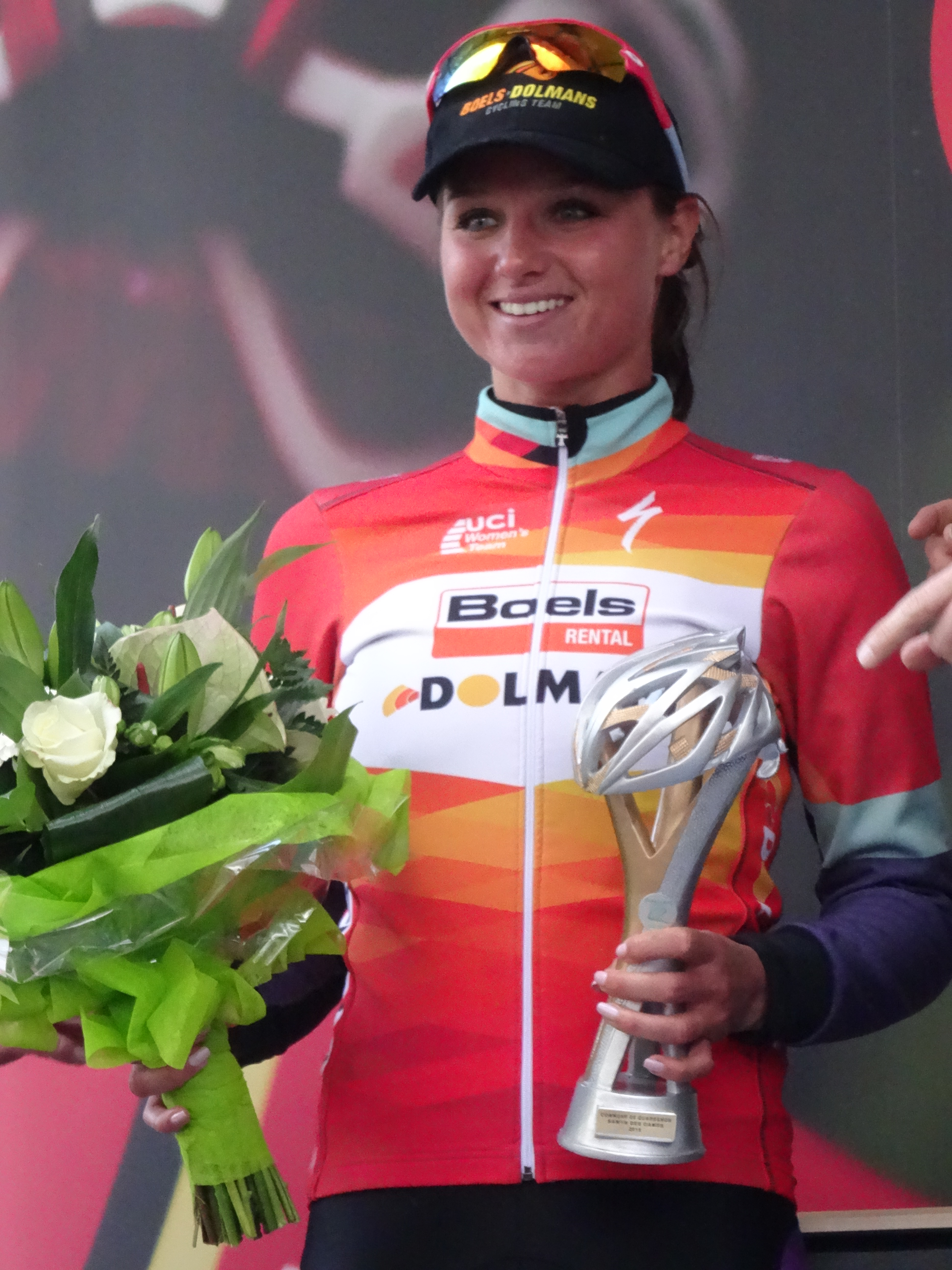
Chantal Blaak after winning Le Samyn des Dames

Single day and stage races 2015
Date	Race	Cat.	Rider	Country	Location
4 February	Ladies Tour of Qatar, Stage 2	2.1	Ellen van Dijk (NED)	Qatar	Madinat ash Shamal
5 February	Ladies Tour of Qatar, Stage 3	2.1	Lizzie Armitstead (GBR)	Qatar	Al Khor Corniche
6 February	Ladies Tour of Qatar, Stage 4	2.1	Lizzie Armitstead (GBR)	Qatar	Doha Corniche
6 February	Ladies Tour of Qatar, Overall	2.1	Lizzie Armitstead (GBR)	Qatar	
6 February	Ladies Tour of Qatar, Points classification	2.1	Lizzie Armitstead (GBR)	Qatar	
4 March	Le Samyn des Dames	1.2	Chantal Blaak (NED)	Belgium	Dour
7 March	Strade Bianche	1.1	Megan Guarnier (USA)	Italy	Siena
29 March	Trofeo Alfredo Binda	UCI Women's Road World Cup	Lizzie Armitstead (GBR)	Italy	Cittiglio
12 April	Energiewacht Tour, Teams classification	2.2	(Note: The riders on the squad were Lizzie Armitstead, Ellen van Dijk, Chantal Blaak, Megan Guarnier, Romy Kasper and Christine Majerus.)	(Note: The race was held in the Netherlands and Germany.)	
15 May	Tour of California Time Trial	1.1	Evelyn Stevens (USA)	United States	Santa Clarita
29 May	Holland Hills Classic	1.1	Lizzie Armitstead (GBR)	Netherlands	Berg en Terblijt
7 June	Philadelphia Cycling Classic	UCI Women's Road World Cup	Lizzie Armitstead (GBR)	United States	Philadelphia
11 June	Emakumeen Euskal Bira, Stage 1	2.1	Megan Guarnier (USA)	Spain	Arrasate
13 June	Emakumeen Euskal Bira, Stage 3	2.1	Chantal Blaak (NED)	Spain	Iturmendi
17 June	The Women's Tour, Stage 1	2.1	Lizzie Armitstead (GBR)	Great Britain	Aldeburgh
19 June	The Women's Tour, Stage 3	2.1	Christine Majerus (LUX)	Great Britain	Kettering
21 June	The Women's Tour, Teams classification	2.1	(Note: The riders on the squad were Lizzie Armitstead, Amalie Dideriksen, Megan Guarnier, Romy Kasper, Christine Majerus and Katarzyna Pawłowska.)	Great Britain	
5 July	Giro d'Italia Femminile, Stage 2	2.1	Megan Guarnier (USA)	Italy	San Fior
14 August	Ladies Tour of Norway, Stage 1	2.2	Megan Guarnier (USA)	Norway	Halden
15 August	Ladies Tour of Norway, Overall	2.2	Megan Guarnier (USA)	Norway	
29 August	GP de Plouay	UCI Women's Road World Cup	Lizzie Armitstead (GBR)	France	Plouay
9 September	Belgium Tour, Stage 2	2.2	Amalie Dideriksen (DNK)	Belgium	Moorslede

== UCI World Ranking ==
The 2015 UCI Women's Road Rankings are rankings based upon the results in all UCI-sanctioned races of the 2015 women's road cycling season.

Boels–Dolmans Cycling Team finished second in the 2015 ranking for UCI teams.

Individual world ranking
Rank	Rider	Points
2	(United Kingdom) Elizabeth Armitstead	1024.5
8	(United States) Megan Guarnier	719.67
13	(Netherlands) Ellen van Dijk	542.25
16	(Luxembourg) Christine Majerus	473.5
23	(United States) Evelyn Stevens	358.92
37	(Netherlands) Chantal Blaak	225.5
102	(Denmark) Amalie Dideriksen	71
158	(Netherlands) Demi de Jong	37
226	(Germany) Romy Kasper	19.25
227	(Poland) Katarzyna Pawłowska	19
