= 2015 Trofeo Alfredo Binda-Comune di Cittiglio =

2015 UCI Women's Road World Cup, race 2 of 10

Race details
- Dates: 29 March 2015
- Distance: 121.4 km (75.4 mi)
- Winning time: 3h 08' 13"

Results
	Winner	Lizzie Armitstead (GBR)	(Boels–Dolmans)
	Second	Pauline Ferrand-Prévot (FRA)	(Rabobank-Liv Woman Cycling Team)
	Third	Anna van der Breggen (NED)	(Rabobank-Liv Woman Cycling Team)

The 2015 Trofeo Alfredo Binda-Comune di Cittiglio was the 40th running of the Trofeo Alfredo Binda-Comune di Cittiglio, a women's bicycle race in Italy. It was the second race of the 2015 UCI Women's Road World Cup season and was held on 29 March 2015, starting and finishing in Cittiglio. The race was won by British cyclist Lizzie Armitstead in a sprint finish of 6 riders, ahead of Pauline Ferrand-Prévot and Anna van der Breggen, winning the first World Cup race of the season for Boels–Dolmans.

== Results ==
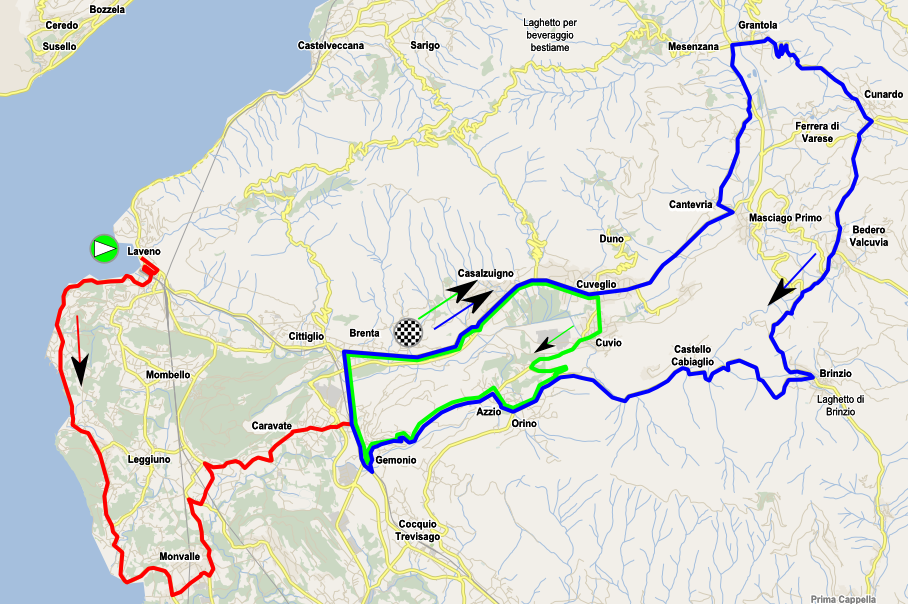
Map of the Trofeo Alfredo Binda-Comune di Cittiglio 2015. Start (red), long circuit made once (blue), short circuit made four times (green)

=== Race result ===
Result
Rank	Rider	Team	Time
1	Lizzie Armitstead (GBR)	Boels–Dolmans	3h 08' 13"
2	Pauline Ferrand-Prévot (FRA)	Rabobank-Liv Woman Cycling Team	+ 0"
3	Anna van der Breggen (NED)	Rabobank-Liv Woman Cycling Team	+ 0"
4	Elisa Longo Borghini (ITA)	Wiggle–Honda	+ 0"
5	Alena Amialiusik (BLR)	Velocio–SRAM	+ 0"
6	Jolanda Neff (SUI)	Switzerland (national team)	+ 3"
7	Annemiek van Vleuten (NED)	Bigla Pro Cycling Team	+ 1' 31"
8	Ellen van Dijk (NED)	Boels–Dolmans	+ 1' 31"
9	Elena Cecchini (ITA)	Lotto–Soudal Ladies	+ 1' 31"
10	Ashleigh Moolman (RSA)	Bigla Pro Cycling Team	+ 1' 31"

=== World Cup standings ===
Individual ranking after 2 of 10 World Cup races
Rank	Rider	Team	Points
1	Lizzie Armitstead (GBR)	Boels–Dolmans	160
2	Jolien D'Hoore (BEL)	Wiggle–Honda	120
3	Ellen van Dijk (NED)	Boels–Dolmans	120
4	Pauline Ferrand-Prévot (FRA)	Rabobank-Liv Woman Cycling Team	100
5	Amy Pieters (NED)	Team Liv–Plantur	100
6	Anna van der Breggen (NED)	Rabobank-Liv Woman Cycling Team	85
7	Lucinda Brand (NED)	Rabobank-Liv Woman Cycling Team	82
8	Elisa Longo Borghini (ITA)	Wiggle–Honda	70
9	Tiffany Cromwell (AUS)	Velocio–SRAM	70
10	Alena Amialiusik (BLR)	Velocio–SRAM	60

== See also ==
- 2015 in women's road cycling
