= Fanny Riberot =

French cyclist (born 1983)

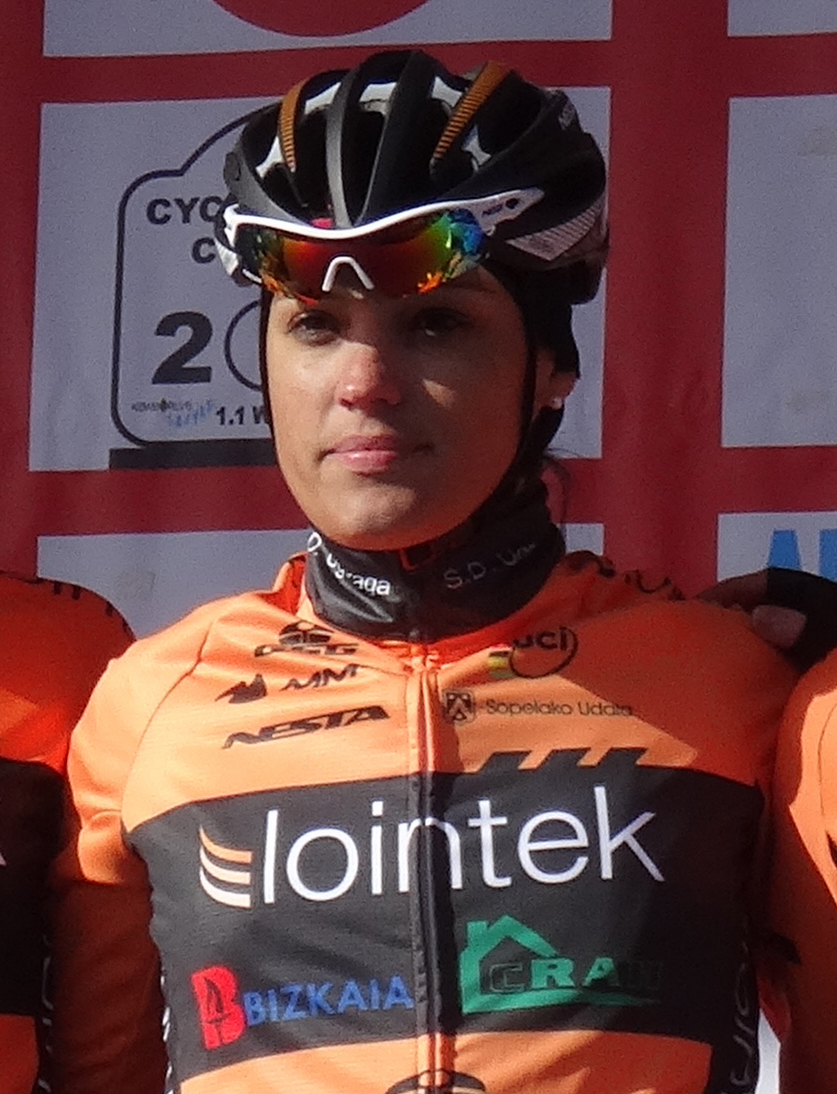
- Riberot in 2015

Personal information
- Born: 17 March 1983 (age 43) Agen, France

Cycling career
- Sport: Cycling
- Current team: Retired
- Discipline: Road
- Role: Rider

Amateur teams
- 1988–2001: Union cycliste Lavardac-Barbaste
- 2002–2005: Vélo-Club Saint-Julien-en-Genevois

Professional teams
- 2006–2007: Pro Feminin Du Genevois
- 2008: Pro Feminin Les Carroz
- 2009–2015: Lointek
- 2016: Astana

Fanny Riberot (born 17 March 1983) is a French former racing cyclist. She finished in third place at the French National Road Race Championships in 2012 and 2014.

== Major results ==
2003
2nd Overall Tour de Charente-Maritime
2005
3rd Time trial, National Under-23 Road Championships
2006
1st Cholet Pays de Loire Dames
2012
3rd Road race, National Road Championships
8th Cholet Pays de Loire Dames
2013
4th Cholet Pays de Loire Dames
2014
3rd Road race, National Road Championships
2015
3rd Tour of Chongming Island World Cup
