= Iturmendi =

- Municipality
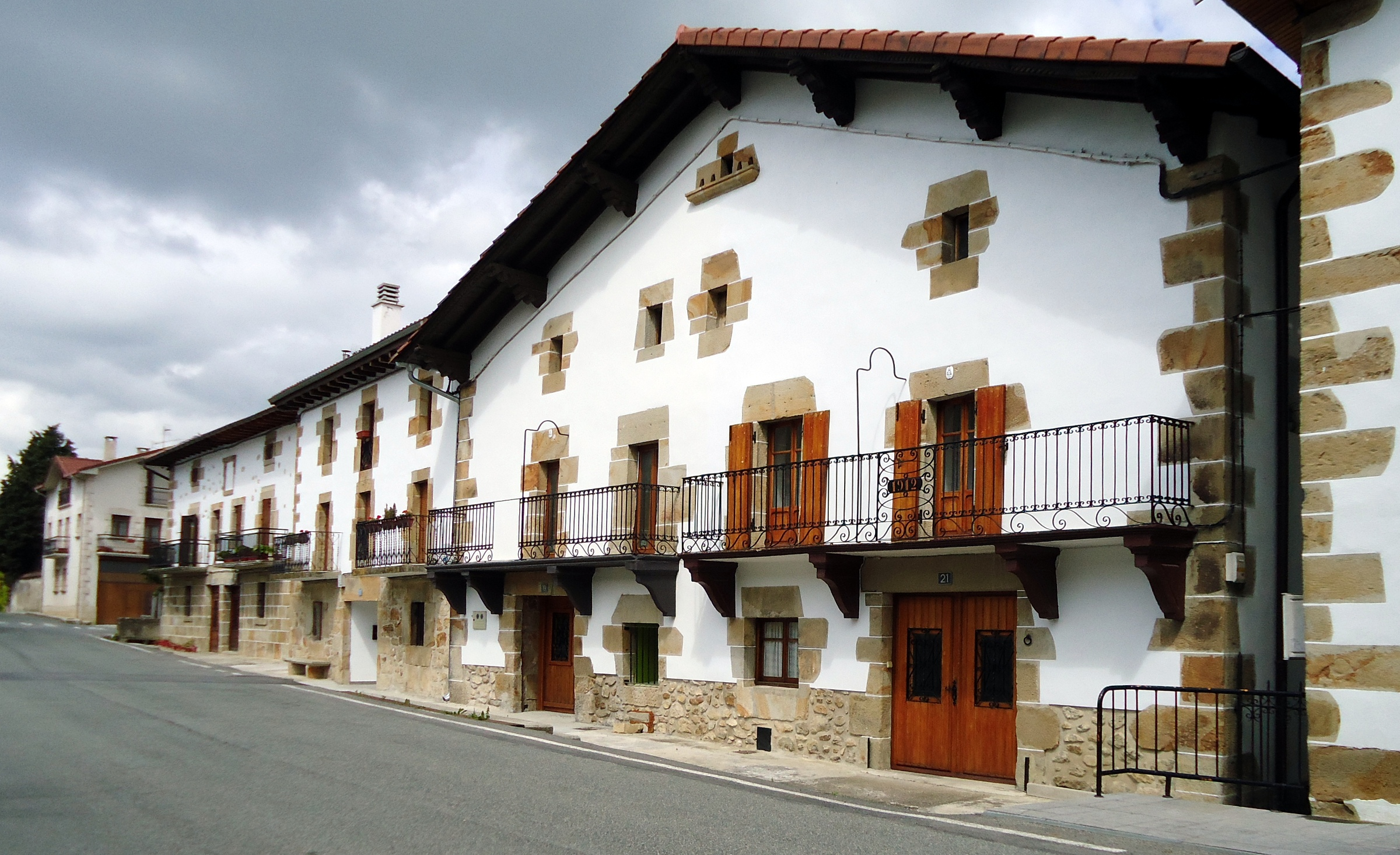
- Houses and Roads in Iturmendi.

- Coat of arms

- Location of Iturmendi. Iturmendi (Navarre)
- Coordinates: 42°53′N 2°07′W
- Country: Spain
- Autonomous community: Navarre
- Merindad: Merindad de Pamplona
- Comarca: Sakana

Government
  - Mayor: Kai Galartza

Area
  - Total: 9.91 km^{2} (3.83 sq mi)
- Elevation: 528 m (1,732 ft)

Population (2023)
  - Total: 303
  - Density: 30.6/km^{2} (79.2/sq mi)
- Time zone: UTC+1 (CET)
  - Summer (DST): UTC+2 (CEST)

Iturmendi is a town and municipality located in the province and autonomous community of Navarre, northern Spain.
