= 2015 UCI Women's Road World Cup =

Series of bicycle races

- Eighteenth edition of the UCI Women's Road World Cup

Details
- Dates: 14 March – 29 August
- Location: Europe, North America and China
- Races: 10

The 2015 UCI Women's Road World Cup is the 18th and last edition of the UCI Women's Road World Cup and part of the 2015 UCI women's calendar.

One race was added compared to the 2014 edition: The Philadelphia Cycling Classic. This race was already on the women's calendar since 2013. The addition of this race caused the World Cup to be held on three continents.

== Races ==
Race calendar
Race	Date	Winner	Second	Third	Ref
(Netherlands) Ronde van Drenthe	14 March	Jolien D'Hoore (BEL)	Amy Pieters (NED)	Ellen van Dijk (NED)	
(Italy) Trofeo Alfredo Binda-Comune di Cittiglio	29 March	Lizzie Armitstead (GBR)	Pauline Ferrand-Prévot (FRA)	Anna van der Breggen (NED)	
(Belgium) Tour of Flanders	5 April	Elisa Longo Borghini (ITA)	Jolien D'Hoore (BEL)	Anna van der Breggen (NED)	
(Belgium) La Flèche Wallonne Féminine	22 April	Anna van der Breggen (NED)	Annemiek van Vleuten (NED)	Megan Guarnier (USA)	
(China) Tour of Chongming Island World Cup	17 May	Giorgia Bronzini (ITA)	Kirsten Wild (NED)	Fanny Riberot (FRA)	
(United States) The Philadelphia Cycling Classic	7 June	Lizzie Armitstead (GBR)	Elisa Longo Borghini (ITA)	Alena Amialiusik (BLR)	
(Germany) Sparkassen Giro	2 August	Barbara Guarischi (ITA)	Lucinda Brand (NED)	Emilie Moberg (NOR)	
(Sweden) Open de Suède Vårgårda TTT	21 August	Rabobank-Liv Woman Cycling Team Lucinda Brand (NED); Anna van der Breggen (NED); Shara Gillow (AUS); Thalita de Jong (NED)	Velocio–SRAM Lisa Brennauer (GER); Trixi Worrack (GER); Karol-Ann Canuel (CAN); Alena Amialiusik (BLR)	Boels–Dolmans Lizzie Armitstead (GBR); Chantal Blaak (NED); Evelyn Stevens (USA); Christine Majerus (LUX)	
(Sweden) Open de Suède Vårgårda	23 August	Jolien D'Hoore (BEL)	Giorgia Bronzini (ITA)	Tiffany Cromwell (AUS)	
(France) GP de Plouay	29 August	Lizzie Armitstead (GBR)	Emma Johansson (SWE)	Pauline Ferrand-Prévot (FRA)	
Final standings		Lizzie Armitstead (GBR)	Anna van der Breggen (NED)	Jolien D'Hoore (BEL)	

== Final World Cup Standings ==
Individual
Rank	Rider	Team	Points
1	Lizzie Armitstead (GBR)	Boels–Dolmans	484
2	Anna van der Breggen (NED)	Rabobank-Liv Woman Cycling Team	435
3	Jolien D'Hoore (BEL)	Wiggle–Honda	391
4	Elisa Longo Borghini (ITA)	Wiggle–Honda	350
5	Lucinda Brand (NED)	Rabobank-Liv Woman Cycling Team	315
6	Pauline Ferrand-Prévot (FRA)	Rabobank-Liv Woman Cycling Team	260
7	Alena Amialiusik (BLR)	Velocio–SRAM	255
8	Giorgia Bronzini (ITA)	Wiggle–Honda	232
9	Ashleigh Moolman Pasio (RSA)	Bigla Pro Cycling Team	230
10	Annemiek van Vleuten (NED)	Bigla Pro Cycling Team	226
Source: Union Cycliste Internationale

Team
Rank	Team	Points
1	Rabobank-Liv Woman Cycling Team	1204
2	Wiggle–Honda	1071
3	Boels–Dolmans	1057
4	Bigla Pro Cycling Team	856
5	Velocio–SRAM	747
6	Orica–AIS	343
7	Team Liv–Plantur	296
8	Team Hitec Products	278
9	Lotto–Soudal	262
10	Alé–Cipollini	207
Source: Union Cycliste Internationale

== See also ==
- 2015 in women's road cycling
