= 2015 Team Liv–Plantur season =

2015 Team Liv-Plantur
- Manager: Hans Timmermans

Season victories
- One-day races: 2
- Stage race overall
- Stage race stages: 1

The 2015 women's road cycling season was the fifth for Team Liv–Plantur (UCI code: TLP), which began as Team Skil-Argos in late 2010. On 24 September 2014 the team announced that they had secured a four-year sponsorship deal with a German hair care company. For the 2015 season the team was known as Team Liv-Plantur, with the men's team becoming Team Giant-Alpecin.

== Roster ==
On 1 September 2014 it was announced that Kirsten Wild would leave the team for Team Hitec Products. Sabrina Stultiens joined the team for the 2015 season, and Molly Weaver joined the team mid season.

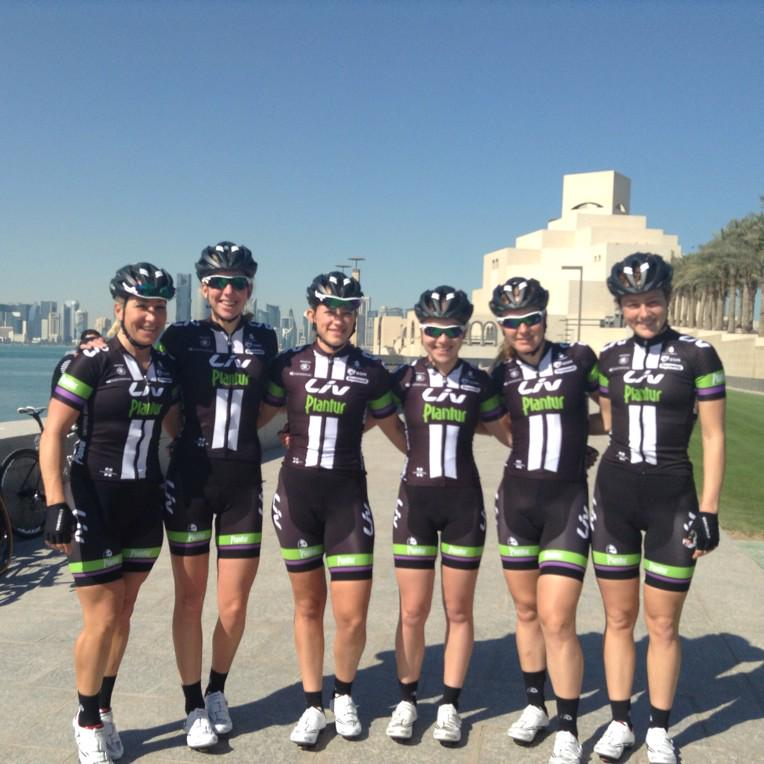
Squad during the 2015 Ladies Tour of Qatar

As of 1 January 2015. Ages as of 1 January 2015.

Rider	Date of birth
Lucy Garner (GBR)	20 September 1994 (aged 20)
Willeke Knol (NED)	10 April 1991 (aged 23)
Claudia Lichtenberg (GER)	17 November 1985 (aged 29)
Floortje Mackaij (NED)	18 October 1995 (aged 19)
Sara Mustonen (SWE)	8 February 1981 (aged 33)

Rider	Date of birth
Amy Pieters (NED)	June 1, 1991 (aged 23)
Maaike Polspoel (BEL)	28 March 1989 (aged 25)
Julia Soek (NED)	December 12, 1990 (aged 24)
Kyara Stijns (NED)	9 October 1995 (aged 19)
Sabrina Stultiens (NED)	8 July 1993 (aged 21)

Riders who joined the team for or during the 2015 season

Rider	2014 team
Sabrina Stultiens (NED)	Rabobank-Liv Woman Cycling Team
Molly Weaver (GBR)	Matrix Fitness Pro Cycling

Riders who left the team during or after the 2014 season

Rider	2015 team
Julia Soek (NED)	
Marijn de Vries (NED)	Parkhotel Valkenburg Continental Team
Kirsten Wild (NED)	Team Hitec Products

== Season victories ==
Single day and stage races 2015
Date	Race	Rider	Country	Location
25 March	Dwars door Vlaanderen	Amy Pieters (NED)	Belgium	Waregem
29 March	Gent–Wevelgem	Floortje Mackaij (NED)	Belgium	Wevelgem
12 April	Energiewacht Tour, Sprints classification	Julia Soek (NED)	(Note: The race was held in the Netherlands and Germany.)	
3 May	Festival Luxembourgeois du cyclisme féminin Elsy Jacobs, Stage 2	Floortje Mackaij (NED)	Luxembourg	Mamer
3 May	Festival Luxembourgeois du cyclisme féminin Elsy Jacobs, Points classification	Floortje Mackaij (NED)	Luxembourg	
3 May	Festival Luxembourgeois du cyclisme féminin Elsy Jacobs, Mountains classification	Floortje Mackaij (NED)	Luxembourg	
3 May	Festival Luxembourgeois du cyclisme féminin Elsy Jacobs, Young rider classification	Floortje Mackaij (NED)	Luxembourg	
7 June	Auensteiner–Radsporttage, Young rider classification	Sabrina Stultiens (NED)	Germany	

== UCI World Ranking ==
The 2015 UCI Women's Road Rankings are rankings based upon the results in all UCI-sanctioned races of the 2015 women's road cycling season.

Team Liv-Plantur finished 8th in the 2015 ranking for UCI teams.

Individual world ranking
Rank	Rider	Points
14	(Netherlands) Amy Pieters	506.5
44	(Netherlands) Floortje Mackaij	190.5
51	(Netherlands) Sabrina Stultiens	161
52	(Germany) Claudia Häusler	152.5
58	(United Kingdom) Lucy Garner	142
91	(Sweden) Sara Mustonen	91.5
270	(United Kingdom) Molly Weaver	13
275	(Netherlands) Julia Soek	12.5
368	(Netherlands) Willeke Knol	8
