= 2015 in women's road cycling =

2015 in women's road cycling is about the 2015 women's bicycle races ruled by the UCI and the 2015 UCI Women's Teams.

== UCI Road World Rankings ==
Final ranking 2015.

Top-ranked individual	Second-ranked individual	Third-ranked individual	Top-ranked team	Top-ranked nation
Anna van der Breggen (NED); Rabobank-Liv Woman Cycling Team	Lizzie Armitstead (GBR); Boels–Dolmans	Jolien D'Hoore (BEL); Wiggle–Honda	Rabobank-Liv Woman Cycling Team	Netherlands

== World Championships ==
The World Road Championships is set to be held in Richmond, Virginia, United States.

Race	Date	Winner	Second	Third
World Championship Team Time Trial	20 September	(Germany) Velocio–SRAM	(Netherlands) Boels–Dolmans	(Netherlands) Rabobank-Liv Woman Cycling Team
World Championship Team Time Trial	20 September	Alena Amialiusik (BLR); Lisa Brennauer (DEU); Karol-Ann Canuel (CAN); Barbara Guarischi (ITA); Mieke Kröger (DEU); Trixi Worrack (DEU)	Lizzie Armitstead (GBR); Chantal Blaak (NED); Christine Majerus (LUX); Katarzyna Pawłowska (POL); Evelyn Stevens (USA); Ellen van Dijk (NED)	Lucinda Brand (NED); Thalita de Jong (NED); Shara Gillow (AUS); Roxane Knetemann (NED); Katarzyna Niewiadoma (POL); Anna van der Breggen (NED)
World Championship Time Trial	22 September	Linda Villumsen (NZL)	Anna van der Breggen (NED)	Lisa Brennauer (GER)
World Championship Road Race	26 September	Elizabeth Armitstead (GBR)	Anna van der Breggen (NED)	Megan Guarnier (USA)

== UCI World Cup ==
Race	Date	Winner	Second	Third
(Netherlands) Ronde van Drenthe	14 March	Jolien D'Hoore (BEL)	Amy Pieters (NED)	Ellen van Dijk (NED)
(Italy) Trofeo Alfredo Binda-Comune di Cittiglio	29 March	Lizzie Armitstead (GBR)	Pauline Ferrand-Prévot (FRA)	Anna van der Breggen (NED)
(Belgium) Tour of Flanders	5 April	Elisa Longo Borghini (ITA)	Jolien D'Hoore (BEL)	Anna van der Breggen (NED)
(Belgium) La Flèche Wallonne Féminine	22 April	Anna van der Breggen (NED)	Annemiek van Vleuten (NED)	Megan Guarnier (USA)
(China) Tour of Chongming Island World Cup	17 May	Giorgia Bronzini (ITA)	Kirsten Wild (NED)	Fanny Riberot (FRA)
(United States) The Philadelphia Cycling Classic	7 June	Lizzie Armitstead (GBR)	Elisa Longo Borghini (ITA)	Alena Amialiusik (BLR)
(Germany) Sparkassen Giro	2 August	Barbara Guarischi (ITA)	Lucinda Brand (NED)	Emilie Moberg (NOR)
(Sweden) Open de Suède Vårgårda TTT	21 August	Rabobank-Liv Woman Cycling Team	Velocio–SRAM	Boels–Dolmans
(Sweden) Open de Suède Vårgårda	23 August	Jolien D'Hoore (BEL)	Giorgia Bronzini (ITA)	Lisa Brennauer (GER)
(France) GP de Plouay	29 August	Lizzie Armitstead (GBR)	Emma Johansson (SWE)	Pauline Ferrand-Prévot (FRA)
Final standings				

== Single day races (1.1 and 1.2) ==
Race	Date	Cat. †	Winner	Second	Third
(Argentina) Gran Prix San Luis Femenino	January 10	1.2	Hannah Barnes (GBR)	Luciene Ferreira (BRA)	Clemilda Fernandes Silva (BRA)
(Belgium) Omloop Het Nieuwsblad	February 28	1.2	Anna van der Breggen (NED)	Ellen van Dijk (NED)	Lizzie Armitstead (GBR)
(Belgium) Le Samyn des Dames	March 4	1.2	Chantal Blaak (NED)	Anna van der Breggen (NED)	Emma Johansson (SWE)
(Italy) Strade Bianche	March 7	1.1	Megan Guarnier (USA)	Lizzie Armitstead (GBR)	Elisa Longo Borghini (ITA)
(Belgium) Omloop van het Hageland	March 8	1.2	Jolien D'Hoore (BEL)	Chantal Blaak (NED)	Sara Mustonen-Lichan (SWE)
(Netherlands) Acht van Westerveld	March 12	1.1	Giorgia Bronzini (ITA)	Valentina Scandolara (ITA)	Annemiek van Vleuten (NED)
(Netherlands) Novilon EDR Cup	March 15	1.2	Kirsten Wild (NED)	Chloe Hosking (AUS)	Christine Majerus (LUX)
(France) Cholet Pays de Loire Dames	March 22	1.2	Audrey Cordon (FRA)	Amélie Rivat (FRA)	Miriam Bjørnsrud (NOR)
(Belgium) Gent–Wevelgem	March 29	1.2	Floortje Mackaij (NED)	Janneke Ensing (NED)	Chloe Hosking (AUS)
(Belgium) Grand Prix de Dottignies	April 6	1.2	Roxane Fournier (FRA)	Chloe Hosking (AUS)	Pascale Jeuland (FRA)
(Netherlands) Ronde van Gelderland	April 19	1.2	Kirsten Wild (NED)	Lucy Garner (GBR)	Barbara Guarischi (ITA)
(Netherlands) EPZ Omloop van Borsele	April 25	1.2	Kirsten Wild (NED)	Shelley Olds (USA)	Anna Knauer (GER)
(Belgium) Dwars door de Westhoek	April 26	1.1	Élise Delzenne (FRA)	Jolien D'Hoore (BEL)	Tiffany Cromwell (AUS)
(South Africa) PMB Road Classic	April 27	1.2	Cherise Taylor (RSA)	An-Li Pretorius (RSA)	Lise Olivier (RSA)
(Netherlands) Ronde van Overijssel	May 1	1.1	Lauren Kitchen (AUS)	Natalie van Gogh (NED)	Anouska Koster (NED)
(South Africa) Hibiscus Cycle Classic	May 3	1.2	Cherise Taylor (RSA)	Lise Olivier (RSA)	An-Li Pretorius (RSA)
(Netherlands) Rabobank Marianne Vos Classic	May 9	1.1	Chloe Hosking (AUS)	Marianne Vos (NED)	Amy Pieters (NED)
(United States) Amgen Tour of California	May 16	1.1	Evelyn Stevens (USA)	Lauren Stephens (USA)	Kristin Armstrong (USA)
(Belgium) Trofee Maarten Wynants	May 16	1.2	Natalie van Gogh (NED)	Lotte Kopecky (BEL)	Sara Mustonen-Lichan (SWE)
(Venezuela) Copa Federación Venezolana de Ciclismo	May 16	1.2	Gleydimar Tapia (VEN)	Jennifer Cesar (VEN)	Daniela Guajardo (CHI)
(Venezuela) Clasico FVCiclismo Corre Por la VIDA	May 17	1.2	Paola Muñoz (CHI)	Yngrid Porras (VEN)	María Tapia (VEN)
(Netherlands) Boels Rental Hills Classic	May 29	1.1	Lizzie Armitstead (GBR)	Emma Johansson (SWE)	Katarzyna Niewiadoma (POL)
(France) Grand Prix de Plumelec-Morbihan Dames	May 30	1.2	Chloe Hosking (AUS)	Pascale Jeuland (FRA)	Eider Merino Cortazar (ESP)
(Belgium) Gooik–Geraardsbergen–Gooik	May 31	1.1	Gracie Elvin (AUS)	Ellen van Dijk (NED)	Mayuko Hagiwara (JPN)
(Switzerland) SwissEver GP Cham-Hagendorn	May 31	1.2	Lizzie Williams (AUS)	Valentina Scandolara (ITA)	Rasa Leleivytė (LTU)
(United States) Winston-Salem Cycling Classic	May 31	1.2	Alena Amialiusik (BLR)	Amber Neben (USA)	Lauren Komanski (USA)
(Russia) Grand Prix of Maykop	June 2	1.2	Anastasia Iakovenko (RUS)	Svetlana Vasilieva (RUS)	Galina Chernyshova (RUS)
(Canada) Grand Prix Cycliste de Gatineau	June 4	1.1	Kirsten Wild (NED)	Joëlle Numainville (CAN)	Christine Majerus (LUX)
(Canada) Chrono Gatineau	June 5	1.1	Carmen Small (USA)	Karol-Ann Canuel (CAN)	Tayler Wiles (USA)
(Spain) Durango-Durango Emakumeen Saria	June 9	1.2	Emma Johansson (SWE)	Katarzyna Niewiadoma (POL)	Elena Cecchini (ITA)
(Slovenia) Ljubljana–Domžale–Ljubljana TT	June 12	1.2	Tatiana Antoshina (RUS)	Ann-Sophie Duyck (BEL)	Jaime Nielsen (NZL)
(Switzerland) GP du Canton d'Argovie	June 14	1.2	Anouska Koster (NED)	Edwige Pitel (FRA)	Thalita de Jong (NED)
(Belgium) Diamond Tour	June 14	1.2	Jolien D'Hoore (BEL)	Kelly Druyts (BEL)	Lisa Brennauer (GER)
(Netherlands) Salverda Omloop van de IJsseldelta	June 20	1.2	Kirsten Wild (NED)	Monique van de Ree (NED)	Kelly Markus (NED)
(Canada) White Spot / Delta Road Race	July 12	1.2	Shelley Olds (USA)	Leah Kirchmann (CAN)	Joanne Kiesanowski (NZL)
La Course by Le Tour de France	July 26	1.1	Anna van der Breggen (NED)	Jolien D'Hoore (BEL)	Amy Pieters (NED)
(Belgium) Erondegemse Pijl (Erpe-Mere)	August 1	1.2	Thalita de Jong (NED)	Élise Delzenne (FRA)	Nina Kessler (NED)
(Spain) La Madrid Challenge by La Vuelta	September 13	1.1	Shelley Olds (USA)	Giorgia Bronzini (ITA)	Kirsten Wild (NED)
(France) Chrono Champenois-Trophée Européen	September 13	1.1	Ann-Sophie Duyck (BEL)	Tiffany Cromwell (AUS)	Hayley Simmonds (GBR)
(Italy) Giro dell'Emilia Internazionale Donne Elite	October 10	1.2	Elisa Longo Borghini (ITA)	Ashleigh Moolman (ZAF)	Amber Neben (USA)
(France) Chrono des Nations	October 18	1.1	Tatiana Antoshina (RUS)	Hanna Solovey (UKR)	Ann-Sophie Duyck (BEL)
(South Africa) 94.7 Cycle Challenge	November 15	1.1	Ashleigh Moolman (RSA)	Sabrina Stultiens (NED)	Floortje Mackaij (NED)

† The clock symbol denotes a race which takes the form of a one-day time trial.

== Stage races (2.1 and 2.2) ==
Race	Date	Cat.	Winner	Second	Third
(Argentina) Tour Femenino de San Luis	January 11–16	2.2	Janildes Fernandes (BRA)	Lauren Stephens (USA)	Ana Paula Polegatch (BRA)
Ladies Tour of Qatar	February 3–6	2.1	Lizzie Armitstead (GBR)	Chloe Hosking (AUS)	Ellen van Dijk (NED)
Women's Tour of New Zealand	February 18–22	2.2	Tayler Wiles (USA)	Megan Guarnier (USA)	Evelyn Stevens (USA)
(Thailand) The Princess Maha Chackri Sirindhon's Cup	April 8–10	2.2	Zhao Juan Meng (HKG)	Lauren Kitchen (AUS)	Thi That Nguyen (VIE)
(Netherlands) Energiewacht Tour	April 8–12	2.2	Lisa Brennauer (GER)	Trixi Worrack (GER)	Christine Majerus (LUX)
(United States) Joe Martin Stage Race	April 23–26	2.2	Lauren Stephens (USA)	Scotti Wilborne (USA)	Amber Neben (USA)
(United States) Tour of the Gila	April 29– May 3	2.2	Mara Abbott (USA)	Katie Hall (USA)	Lauren Stephens (USA)
(Czech Republic) Gracia–Orlová	April 30– May 3	2.2	Alena Amialiusik (BLR)	Trixi Worrack (GER)	Eugenia Bujak (POL)
(Luxembourg) Festival Luxembourgeois du cyclisme féminin Elsy Jacobs	May 1–3	2.1	Anna van der Breggen (NED)	Annemiek van Vleuten (NED)	Lucinda Brand (NED)
(United States) Tour of California	May 8–10	2.1	Trixi Worrack (GER)	Leah Kirchmann (CAN)	Lauren Komanski (USA)
(China) Tour of Chongming Island	May 13–15	2.1	Kirsten Wild (NED)	Roxane Fournier (FRA)	Annalisa Cucinotta (ITA)
(China) Tour of Zhoushan Island	May 20–22	2.1	Lauren Kitchen (AUS)	Elena Kuchinskaya (RUS)	Charlotte Becker (GER)
(Russia) Tour of Adygeya	June 3–06	2.2	Svetlana Vasilieva (RUS)	Anastasia Iakovenko (RUS)	Natalia Boyarskaya (RUS)
(Germany) Auensteiner-Radsporttage	June 6–07	2.2	Ashleigh Moolman (RSA)	Sabrina Stultiens (NED)	Polona Batagelj (SVN)
(Spain) Emakumeen Euskal Bira	June 10–14	2.1	Katarzyna Niewiadoma (POL)	Ashleigh Moolman (RSA)	Emma Johansson (SWE)
(United Kingdom) The Women's Tour	June 17–21	2.1	Lisa Brennauer (GER)	Jolien D'Hoore (BEL)	Christine Majerus (LUX)
(Italy) Giro del Trentino Alto Adige-Südtirol	June 19–21	2.1	Amanda Spratt (AUS)	Anna Zita Maria Stricker (ITA)	Lara Vieceli (ITA)
(Italy) Giro d'Italia Femminile	July 3–12	2.1	Anna van der Breggen (NED)	Mara Abbott (USA)	Megan Guarnier (USA)
(Czech Republic) Tour de Feminin-O cenu Českého Švýcarska	July 9–12	2.2	Tatiana Antoshina (RUS)	Lauren Stephens (USA)	Anna Plichta (POL)
(France) Tour de Bretagne Féminin	July 16–19	2.2	Ilaria Sanguineti (ITA)	Christine Majerus (LUX)	Tatiana Antoshina (RUS)
(Netherlands) BeNe Ladies Tour	July 17–19	2.2	Jolien D'Hoore (BEL)	Floortje Mackaij (NED)	Elena Cecchini (ITA)
(Germany) Internationale Thüringen Rundfahrt der Frauen	July 17–23	2.1	Emma Johansson (SWE)	Karol-Ann Canuel (CAN)	Lauren Stephens (USA)
La Route de France	August 8–16	2.1	Elisa Longo Borghini (ITA)	Amber Neben (USA)	Claudia Lichtenberg (GER)
Ladies Tour of Norway	August 14–16	2.2	Megan Guarnier (USA)	Shelley Olds (USA)	Amanda Spratt (AUS)
(France) Trophée d'Or Féminin	August 22–26	2.2	Rachel Neylan (AUS)	Edwige Pitel (FRA)	Carlee Taylor (AUS)
(Netherlands) Boels Rental Ladies Tour	September 1–6	2.1	Lisa Brennauer (GER)	Lucinda Brand (NED)	Ellen van Dijk (NED)
(France) Tour Cycliste Féminin International de l'Ardèche	September 2–7	2.2	Tayler Wiles (USA)	Lauren Stephens (USA)	Rossella Ratto (ITA)
Lotto Belisol Belgium Tour	September 10–14	2.2	Emma Johansson (SWE)	Amalie Dideriksen (DEN)	Anna van der Breggen (NED)

== Cancelled Events ==
Race	Date	Cat.
(Syria) Golan I	August 19	1.2
(Syria) Golan II	August 21	1.2
(Syria) Golan III	August 23	1.2
(France) Les 4 jours féminins	July 21–24	2.2

== Championships ==
=== International Games ===
Championships	Race	Date	Winner	Second	Third
All-Africa Games	Team time trial	10 September	Nigeria; Rosemary Marcus; Gladys Grikpa Tombrapa; Happy Okafor; Glory Odiase	South Africa; Lise Olivier; Catherine Colyn; Heidi Dalton; Zanele Tshoko	Ethiopia; Gebre Tsega Beyene; Hadnet Asmelash; Tesfoam Eyeru Gebru; Sendel Hafte Tewele
All-Africa Games	Individual time trial	11 September	Mossana Debesay (ERI)	Wehazit Kidane (ERI)	Lise Olivier (RSA)
All-Africa Games	Road race	12 September	Kimberley Le Court De Billot (MRI)	Gladys Grikpa Tombrapa (NGR)	Lise Olivier (RSA)
European Games	Individual time trial	18 June	Ellen van Dijk (NED)	Hanna Solovey (UKR)	Annemiek van Vleuten (NED)
European Games	Road race	20 June	Alena Amialiusik (BLR)	Katarzyna Niewiadoma (POL)	Anna van der Breggen (NED)
Pan American Games	Individual time trial	22 July	Kelly Catlin (USA)	Jasmin Glaesser (CAN)	Evelyn García (SLV)
Pan American Games	Road race	25 July	Jasmin Glaesser (CAN)	Marlies Mejías (CUB)	Allison Beveridge (CAN)
Island Games	Individual time trial	28 June	Kim Ashton (Jersey)	Elizabeth Holden (Isle of Man)	Christine McLean (Shetland)

=== Continental Championships ===
Championships	Race	Winner	Second	Third
African Continental Championships; South Africa	Road race	Ashleigh Moolman (RSA)	Lise Olivier (RSA)	Hadnet Kidane (ETH)
African Continental Championships; South Africa	Individual time trial	Ashleigh Moolman (RSA)	Heidi Dalton (RSA)	Aurelie Halbwachs (MRI)
Oceania Cycling Championships; Australia	Road race	Lauren Kitchen (AUS)	Lizzie Williams (AUS)	Katrin Garfoot (AUS)
Oceania Cycling Championships; Australia	Individual time trial	Katrin Garfoot (AUS)	Lauren Kitchen (AUS)	Rebecca Mackey (AUS)
Pan American Championships; Mexico	Road race	Marlies Mejías (CUB)	Coryn Rivera (USA)	Yumari González (CUB)
Pan American Championships; Mexico	Individual time trial	Carmen Small (USA)	Tara Whitten (CAN)	Clemilda Fernandes (BRA)
Asian Cycling Championships; Thailand (2015 summary)	Road race	Ting Ying Huang (TAI)	Mei Yu Hsiao (TAI)	Zhao Juan Meng (HKG)
Asian Cycling Championships; Thailand (2015 summary)	Individual time trial	Reum Ah Na (KOR)	Mayuko Hagiwara (JPN)	Tüvshinjargalyn Enkhjargal (MGL)
European Road Championships; Estonia (2015 summary)	Road race (under-23)	Katarzyna Niewiadoma (POL)	Ilaria Sanguineti (ITA)	Thalita de Jong (NED)
European Road Championships; Estonia (2015 summary)	Individual time trial (under-23)	Mieke Kröger (GER)	Olga Shekel (UKR)	Corinna Lechner (GER)

== UCI teams ==
The country designation of each team is determined by the country of registration of the largest number of its riders, and is not necessarily the country where the team is registered or based.\

List updated 8 January 2015 (

)

The 2015 UCI Women's Teams are:

Code	Official team name	Country	Continent
ALE	Astana–Acca Due O (2015 season)	Italy	Europe
ASA	Alé Cipollini (2015 season)	Kazakhstan	Asia
BPK	BePink-La Classica (2015 season)	Italy	Europe
BCT	Bigla Pro Cycling Team (2015 season)	Switzerland	Europe
BPD	Bizkaia–Durango (2015 season)	Spain	Europe
DLT	Boels Dolmans Cycling Team (2015 season)	Netherlands	Europe
BTC	BTC City Ljubljana (2015 season)	Slovenia	Europe
BZK	BZK Emakumeen Bira (2015 season)	Spain	Europe
GPC	China Chongming–Liv–Champion System Pro Cycling (2015 season)	Hong Kong	Asia
FCT	Feminine Cycling Team (2015 season)	Germany	Europe
HPU	Hitec Products (2015 season)	Norway	Europe
ISG	Inpa Sottoli Giusfredi (2015 season)	Italy	Europe
SLP	Itau Shimano Ladies Power Team (2015 season)	Argentina	America
LWZ	Lensworld.eu–Zannata (2015 season)	Belgium	Europe
LTK	Lointek Team (2015 season)	Spain	Europe
LBL	Lotto–Soudal Ladies (2015 season)	Belgium	Europe
MAT	Matrix Fitness (2015 season)	United Kingdom	Europe
NOE	NÖ RadUnion Vitalogic (2015 season)	Austria	Europe
OPW	Optum-Kelly Benefit Strategies (2015 season)	United States	America
GEW	Orica–AIS (2015 season)	Australia	Oceania
PHV	Parkhotel Valkenburg Continental Team (2015 season)	Netherlands	Europe
PPC	Pepper Palace p/b The Happy Tooth (2015 season)	United States	America
FUT	Poitou–Charentes.Futuroscope.86 (2015 season)	France	Europe
RBW	Rabo–Liv Women Cycling Team (2015 season)	Netherlands	Europe
MIC	S.C. Michela Fanini Rox (2015 season)	Italy	Europe
SEF	Servetto Footon (2015 season)	Italy	Europe
TLP	Team Liv–Plantur (2015 season)	Netherlands	Europe
TRY	Team Rytger (2015 season)	Denmark	Europe
TIB	Team TIBCO-SVB (2015 season)	United States	America
TOG	Top Girls Fassa Bortolo (2015 season)	Italy	Europe
VLL	Topsport Vlaanderen–Pro-Duo (2015 season)	Belgium	Europe
TI6	Twenty16 p/b Sho-Air (2015 season)	United States	America
UHC	UnitedHealthcare Professional Cycling Team (2015 season)	United States	America
VAI	Vaiano Fondriest (2015 season)	Italy	Europe
VEL	Velocio–SRAM (2015 season)	Germany	Europe
WHT	Wiggle–Honda (2015 season)	United Kingdom	Europe
