= 2015 BePink LaClassica season =

2015 BePink-La Classica
- UCI code: BPK
- Manager: Walter Zini
- Main sponsor(s): LaClassica
- Based: Italy
- Bicycles: Kemo

Season victories
- Stage race overall: 1
- Stage race stages: 2
- National Championships: 5

The 2015 women's road cycling season was the fourth for the BePink–La Classica cycling team, which began as Be Pink in 2012.

== Team roster ==
=== 2015 ===
As of 29 March 2016. Ages as of 1 January 2016.

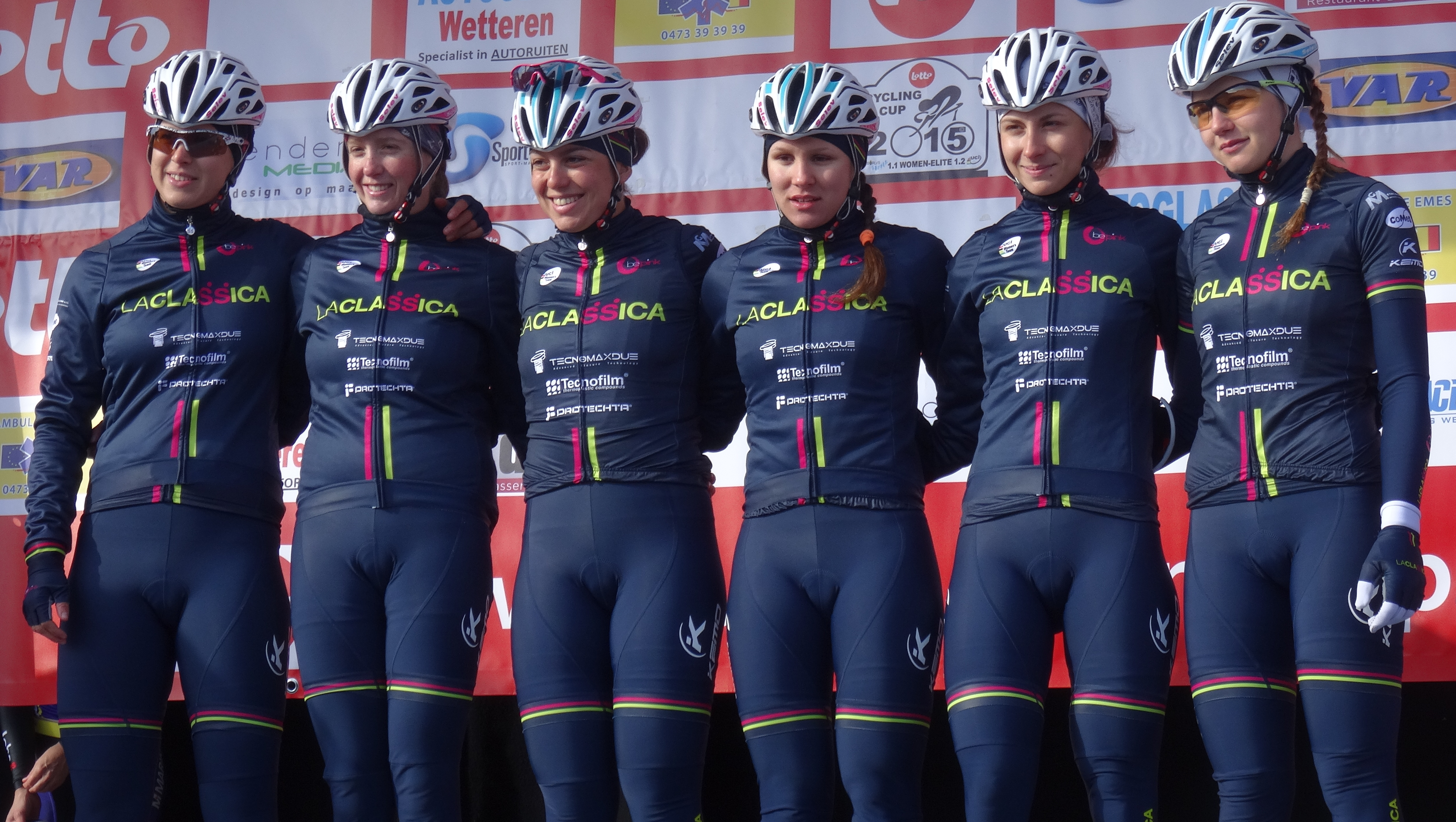
The squad during the 2015 Le Samyn des Dames

Rider	Date of birth
Ilaria Bonomi (ITA)	May 13, 1995 (aged 20)
Simona Bortolotti (ITA)	December 6, 1994 (aged 21)
Anastasia Chulkova (RUS)	March 7, 1985 (aged 30)
Ana Maria Covrig (ROU)	December 8, 1994 (aged 21)
Giorgia Fraiegari (ITA)	July 18, 1995 (aged 20)
Ruby Livingstone (NZL)	March 12, 1993 (aged 22)
Michela Maltese (ITA)	April 20, 1995 (aged 20)

Rider	Date of birth
Tereza Medveďová (SVK)	March 27, 1996 (aged 19)
Jaime Nielsen (NZL)	September 3, 1985 (aged 30)
Ilaria Sanguineti (ITA)	April 15, 1994 (aged 21)
Ksenyia Tuhai (BLR)	July 1, 1995 (aged 20)
Silvia Valsecchi (ITA)	July 19, 1982 (aged 33)
Georgia Williams (NZL)	August 25, 1993 (aged 22)
Lex Albrecht (CAN)	April 6, 1987 (aged 28)
Olga Zabelinskaya (RUS)	May 10, 1980 (aged 35)

Riders who joined the team for the 2015 season

Rider	2014 team
Ilaria Bonomi (ITA)	Alé–Cipollini
Simona Bortolotti (ITA)	Servetto Footon
Anastasia Chulkova (RUS)	RusVelo
Giorgia Fraiegari (ITA)	
Ruby Livingstone (NZL)	
Tereza Medveďová (SVK)	
Jaime Nielsen (NZL)	

Riders who left the team during or after the 2014 season

Rider	2015 team
Alice Algisi (ITA)	Alé–Cipollini
Alena Amialiusik (BLR)	Velocio–SRAM
Alice Maria Arzuffi (ITA)	Inpa Sottoli Giusfredi
Marzahan Baitleuova (KAZ)	Astana-Acca Due O
Noemi Cantele (ITA)	
Kseniia Dobrynina (RUS)	Astana-Acca Due O
Simona Frapporti (ITA)	Alé–Cipollini
Dalia Muccioli (ITA)	Alé–Cipollini
Faina Potapova (KAZ)	Astana-Acca Due O
Doris Schweizer (SUI)	Bigla Pro Cycling Team
Anna Zita Maria Stricker (ITA)	Inpa Sottoli Giusfredi
Makhabbat Umutzhanova (KAZ)	Astana-Acca Due O
Yekaterina Yuraitis (KAZ)	Astana-Acca Due O
Susanna Zorzi (ITA)	Lotto–Soudal Ladies

== Season victories ==
Date	Race	Rider	Country	Location
22 May	Tour of Zhoushan Island, Stage 3	Anastasia Chulkova (RUS)	China	Shanghai
22 May	Tour of Zhoushan Island, Mountains classification	Anastasia Chulkova (RUS)	China	
16 July	Tour de Bretagne Féminin, Stage 1	Ilaria Sanguineti (ITA)	France	Grand-Champ
19 July	Tour de Bretagne Féminin, Overall	Ilaria Sanguineti (ITA)	France	

== UCI world ranking ==
The 2015 UCI Women's Road Rankings are rankings based upon the results in all UCI-sanctioned races of the 2015 women's road cycling season.

BePink LaClassica finished 16th in the 2015 ranking for UCI teams.

Individual world ranking
Rank	Rider	Points
28	(United States) Amber Neben	301
59	(Italy) Ilaria Sanguineti	139.25
129	(New Zealand) Jaime Nielsen	52
162	(Russia) Anastasia Chulkova	35.25
176	(Guam) Lenore Pipes	31
185	(Italy) Silvia Valsecchi	26.25
225	(Romania) Ana Maria Covrig	19.25
414	(New Zealand) Georgia Williams	6.25
556	(Belarus) Ksenyia Tuhai	3
