= 2015 Astana–Acca Due O season =

Astana–Acca Due O
- UCI code: ASA
- Manager: Zulfia Zabirova; Maurizio Fabretto
- Main sponsor(s): Acca Due O
- Based: Kazakhstan
- Bicycles: Kuota

The 2015 women's road cycling season was the first for the Astana–Acca Due O cycling team, which began in 2015.

== Team roster ==
As of 10 March 2015. Ages as of 1 January 2015.

Rider	Date of birth
Aizhan Zhaparova (RUS)	May 1, 1989 (aged 25)
Kseniya Dobrynina (RUS)	January 11, 1994 (aged 20)
Larisa Pankova (RUS)	May 12, 1991 (aged 23)
Marika Campagnaro (ITA)	March 27, 1996 (aged 18)
Yekaterina Yuraitis (KAZ)	August 8, 1996 (aged 18)
Natalya Saifutdinova (KAZ)	February 11, 1989 (aged 25)
Makhabbat Umutzhanova (KAZ)	August 11, 1994 (aged 20)
Marzhan Baitleuova (KAZ)	March 12, 1994 (aged 20)

Rider	Date of birth
Faina Potapova (KAZ)	September 12, 1996 (aged 18)
Natalya Sokovnina (KAZ)	January 18, 1990 (aged 24)
Aliya Kargaliyeva (KAZ)	March 22, 1993 (aged 21)
Milda Jankauskaitė (LTU)	October 1, 1995 (aged 19)
Íngrid Drexel (MEX)	July 28, 1993 (aged 21)
Carolina Rodriguez Gutierrez (MEX)	September 30, 1993 (aged 21)
Olena Demydova (UKR)	September 11, 1995 (aged 19)

Riders who left the team during or after the 2015 season

Rider	2015 team
Hanna Solovey (UKR)	

== UCI World Ranking ==
The 2015 UCI Women's Road Rankings are rankings based upon the results in all UCI-sanctioned races of the 2015 women's road cycling season.

Astana-Acca Due O finished 28th in the 2015 ranking for UCI teams.

Individual world ranking
Rank	Rider	Points
205	(Mexico) Íngrid Drexel	22
224	(Russia) Larisa Pankova	20
272	(Mexico) Carolina Rodriguez Gutierrez	13
280	(Kazakhstan) Natalya Saifutdinova	12
400	(Ukraine) Olena Demydova	7
405	(Kazakhstan) Makhabbat Umutzhanova	7
456	(Kazakhstan) Faina Potapova	5
480	(Kazakhstan) Yekaterina Yuraitis	4
485	(Kazakhstan) Natalya Sokovnina	4
595	(Russia) Kseniia Dobrynina	2
606	(Belarus) Alena Sitsko	1
