= 2015 Alé–Cipollini season =

2015 Alé–Cipollini
- UCI code: ALE
- Manager: Alessia Piccolo
- Main sponsor(s): Alé, Cipollini and Galassia
- Based: Italy
- Bicycles: Cipollini

Season victories
- One-day races: 1
- Stage race overall: 1
- Stage race stages: 4
- National Championships: 1

The 2015 women's road cycling season was the fifth for the Alé–Cipollini cycling team, which began as Mcipollini–Giordana in 2011.

== Roster ==
Rider	Date of birth
Alice Algisi (ITA)	10 March 1993 (age 33)
Beatrice Bartelloni (ITA)	5 February 1993 (age 33)
Elena Berlato (ITA)	2 August 1988 (age 38)
Francesca Cauz (ITA)	24 September 1992 (age 33)
Maria Giulia Confalonieri (ITA)	30 March 1993 (age 33)
Annalisa Cucinotta (ITA)	3 April 1986 (age 40)
Fleur Faure (FRA)	13 August 1993 (age 32)
Uênia Fernandes de Souza (BRA)	12 August 1984 (age 41)

Rider	Date of birth
Arianna Fidanza (ITA)	6 January 1995 (age 31)
Simona Frapporti (ITA)	14 July 1988 (age 38)
Małgorzata Jasińska (POL)	18 January 1984 (age 42)
Dalia Muccioli (ITA)	22 May 1993 (age 33)
Shelley Olds (Note: Ryan joined the team on 26 June) (USA)	30 September 1980 (age 45)
Flávia Oliveira (BRA)	27 October 1981 (age 44)
Beatrice Rossato (ITA)	6 November 1996 (age 29)
Marta Tagliaferro (ITA)	4 November 1989 (age 36)

Riders who joined the team for the 2015 season
Rider	2014 team
Alice Algisi (ITA)	Astana BePink Women Team
Beatrice Bartelloni (ITA)	Wiggle–Honda
Francesca Cauz (ITA)	Top Girls Fassa Bortolo
Maria Giulia Confalonieri (ITA)	Estado de México–Faren Kuota
Annalisa Cucinotta (ITA)	Servetto Footon
Fleur Faure (FRA)	
Uênia Fernandes de Souza (BRA)	Estado de México–Faren Kuota
Arianna Fidanza (ITA)	Estado de México–Faren Kuota
Simona Frapporti (ITA)	Astana BePink Women Team
Dalia Muccioli (ITA)	Astana BePink Women Team
Flávia Oliveira (BRA)	Firefighters Upsala CK
Beatrice Rossato (ITA)	

Riders who left the team during or after the 2014 season
Rider	2015 team
Monia Baccaille (ITA)	
Ilaria Bonomi (ITA)	BePink–La Classica
Valentina Carretta (ITA)	
Barbara Guarischi (ITA)	Velocio–SRAM
Tatiana Guderzo (ITA)	Team Hitec Products
Shelley Olds (USA)	Bigla Pro Cycling Team
Michela Pavin (ITA)	Servetto Footon
Carla Ryan (AUS)	
Ane Santesteban (ESP)	Inpa Sottoli Giusfredi

== Season victories ==
Date	Race	Cat.	Rider	Country	Location
3 February	Ladies Tour of Qatar, Stage 1	2.1	Annalisa Cucinotta (ITA)	Qatar	Dukhan Beach
6 February	Ladies Tour of Qatar, Young rider classification	2.1	Beatrice Bartelloni (ITA)	Qatar	
15 May	Tour of Chongming Island, Teams classification	2.1	(Note: The riders on the squad were Beatrice Bartelloni, Maria Giulia Confalonieri, Annalisa Cucinotta, Arianna Fidanza, Simona Frapporti and Marta Tagliaferro.)	China	
27 June	Polish National Road Race Championships	NC	Małgorzata Jasińska (POL)	Poland	Sobótka
7 July	Giro d'Italia Femminile, Stage 4	2.1	Annalisa Cucinotta (ITA)	Italy	Pozzo d'Adda
15 August	Ladies Tour of Norway, Stage 2	2.1	Shelley Olds (USA)	Norway	Halden
13 September	Giro della Toscana Int. Femminile – Memorial Michela Fanini, Stage 2	2.2	Małgorzata Jasińska (POL)	Italy	Capannori
13 September	Giro della Toscana Int. Femminile – Memorial Michela Fanini, Overall	2.2	Małgorzata Jasińska (POL)	Italy	
13 September	Giro della Toscana Int. Femminile – Memorial Michela Fanini, Mountains classification	2.2	Małgorzata Jasińska (POL)	Italy	
13 September	Giro della Toscana Int. Femminile – Memorial Michela Fanini, Young rider classification	2.2	Maria Giulia Confalonieri (ITA)	Italy	
13 September	La Madrid Challenge by La Vuelta	1.1	Shelley Olds (USA)	Spain	Madrid

== UCI World Ranking ==
The 2015 UCI Women's Road Rankings are rankings based upon the results in all UCI-sanctioned races of the 2015 women's road cycling season.

Alé Cipollini finished 9th in the 2015 ranking for UCI teams.

Individual world ranking
Rank	Rider	Points
15	(United States) Shelley Olds	481
56	(Italy) Annalisa Cucinotta	147
60	(Brazil) Flávia Oliveira	139
72	(Poland) Małgorzata Jasińska	112.5
73	(Italy) Maria Giulia Confalonieri	109.5
89	(Italy) Marta Tagliaferro	93.5
114	(Italy) Arianna Fidanza	60
237	(Italy) Elena Berlato	16.5
276	(Italy) Beatrice Bartelloni	12.5
412	(Italy) Francesca Cauz	7
446	(Italy) Dalia Muccioli	5
493	(Brazil) Uênia Fernandes de Souza	4
552	(Italy) Beatrice Rossato	3
