= Brabantse Pijl (women's race) =

Cycling race in Belgium

Race details
- Date: March / April
- Region: Belgium
- English name: Pajot Hills Classic (2016–2017)
- Discipline: Road
- Competition: 1.2 (2016–2017); 1.1 (2018–2021); UCI Women's ProSeries (2022–)
- Organiser: Flanders Classics

History
- First edition: 2016
- Editions: 11 (as of 2026)
- First winner: Marianne Vos (NED)
- Most wins: Elisa Longo Borghini (ITA) (2 wins)
- Most recent: Célia Gery (FRA)

The Brabantse Pijl is an elite women's professional one-day road bicycle race held in Belgium, part of the UCI Women's ProSeries. The race takes place alongside Brabantse Pijl – an elite men's race that was first held in 1961.

The race was first held in 2016 as the Pajot Hills Classic. In 2018, the name changed to Brabantse Pijl Dames Gooik, aligning the event with that of the men's, albeit with a finish in Gooik. In 2022, the race shifted to use the same parcours as the men's race, with a finish in Overijse.

The race is considered transitionary, positioned between the flatter cobbled classics and the steeper Ardennes classics races. The course features the cobbled Moskesstraat climb (550 metres in length, average gradient of 7.98% with a maximum gradient of 18%), previously used at the 2021 UCI Road World Championships.

== Winners ==
Year	Country	Rider	Team
2016	Netherlands	Marianne Vos	Rabobank-Liv Woman Cycling Team
2017	Australia	Annette Edmondson	Wiggle High5
2018	Italy	Marta Bastianelli	Alé–Cipollini
2019	Belgium	Sofie De Vuyst	Parkhotel Valkenburg
2020	Australia	Grace Brown	Mitchelton–Scott
2021	United States	Ruth Winder	Trek–Segafredo
2022	Netherlands	Demi Vollering	SD Worx
2023	Italy	Silvia Persico	UAE Team Emirates
2024	Italy	Elisa Longo Borghini	Lidl–Trek
2025	Italy	Elisa Longo Borghini	UAE Team ADQ
2026	France	Célia Gery	FDJ United–Suez

=== Multiple winners ===
Wins	Rider	Nationality	Editions
2	Elisa Longo Borghini	Italy	2024, 2025

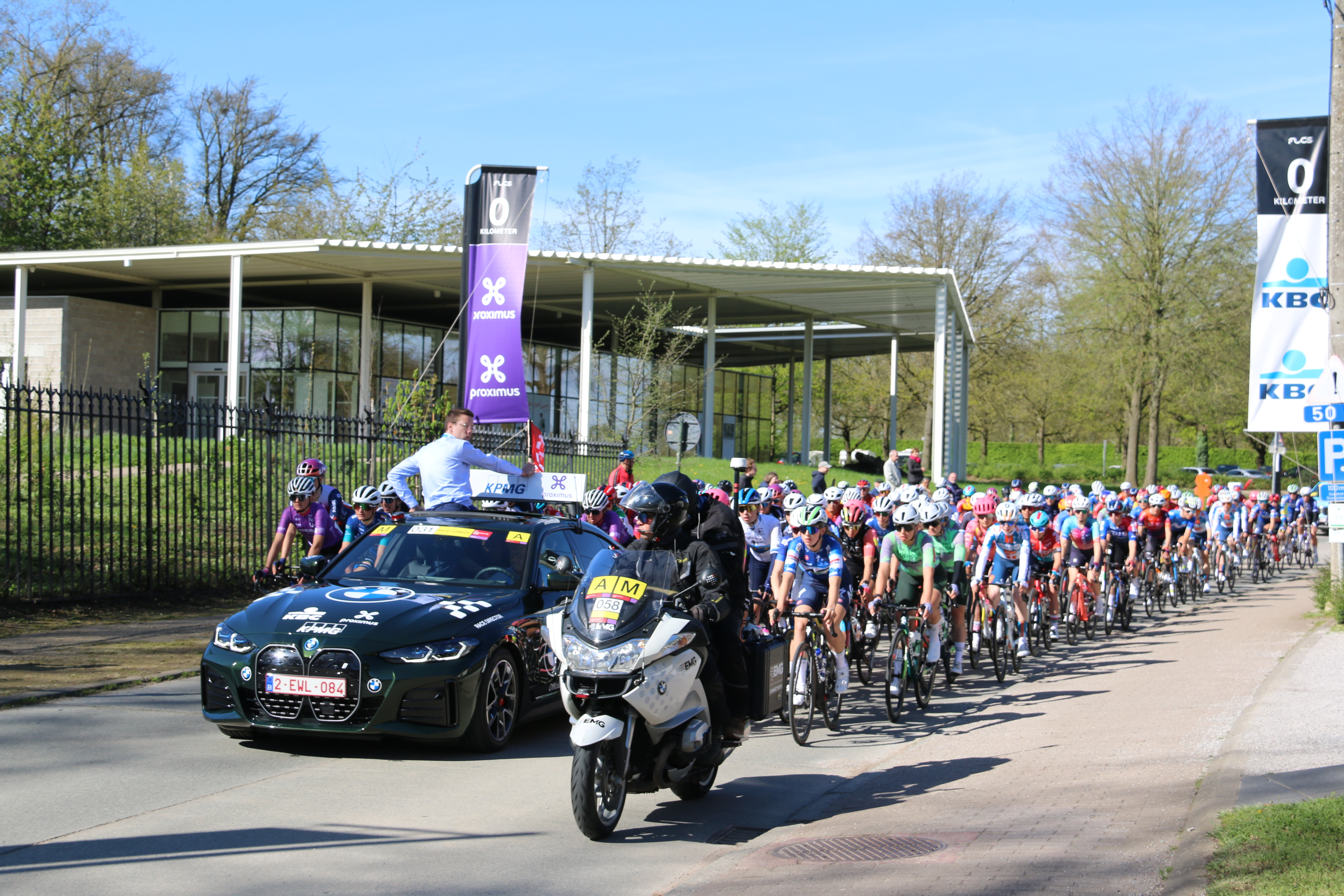
The peloton at the 2024 edition of the race

=== Wins per country ===
Wins	Country
4	Italy
2	Australia; Netherlands
1	Belgium; France; United States
