= 2017 Pajot Hills Classic =

Race details
- Dates: 29 March 2017
- Distance: 122.4 km (76.1 mi)
- Winning time: 3h 16' 31"

Results
	Winner	Annette Edmondson (AUS)	(Wiggle High5)
	Second	Barbara Guarischi (ITA)	(Canyon//SRAM)
	Third	Ilaria Sanguineti (ITA)	(Bepink–Cogeas)

The 2017 Pajot Hills Classic was the second edition of the Pajot Hills Classic, a women's bicycle race in Belgium. It was held on 29 March 2017 over a distance of 122.4 kilometres (76.1 miles) starting and finishing in Gooik. It was rated by the UCI as a 1.2 category race.

== Race ==
The race was characterized by a number of attacks, especially during the final few laps. This was not enough to stop the race from ending in an uphill bunch sprint where Annette Edmondson (Wiggle High5 ) prevailed over Barbara Guarischi (Canyon–SRAM) and Ilaria Sanguineti (Bepink) at the line.

== Result ==
Result
Rank	Rider	Team	Time
1	Annette Edmondson (AUS)	Wiggle High5	3:16:31
2	Barbara Guarischi (ITA)	Canyon//SRAM	+ 0"
3	Ilaria Sanguineti (ITA)	Bepink–Cogeas	+ 0"
4	Roxane Fournier (FRA)	FDJ Nouvelle-Aquitaine Futuroscope	+ 0"
5	Christina Siggaard (DEN)	Team Virtu Cycling	+ 0"
6	Tiffany Cromwell (AUS)	Canyon//SRAM	+ 0"
7	Amy Pieters (NED)	Boels–Dolmans	+ 0"
8	Mia Radotić (CRO)	BTC City Ljubljana	+ 0"
9	Amalie Dideriksen (DEN)	Boels–Dolmans	+ 0"
10	Sheyla Gutiérrez (SPA)	Cylance Pro Cycling	+ 0"

== See also ==
- 2017 in women's road cycling
