= 2015 UCI Women's Road World Rankings =

The 2015 UCI Women's Road Rankings is an overview of the UCI Women's Road Rankings, based upon the results in all UCI-sanctioned races of the 2015 women's road cycling season.

== Summary ==
Top-ranked individual	Second-ranked individual	Third-ranked individual	Top-ranked team	Top-ranked nation
Anna van der Breggen (NED); Rabobank-Liv Woman Cycling Team	Lizzie Armitstead (GBR); Boels–Dolmans	Jolien D'Hoore (BEL); Wiggle–Honda	Rabobank-Liv Woman Cycling Team	Netherlands

Final ranking.

== Individual World Ranking (top 100) ==
Final ranking 2015

#	Cyclists	Nation	Team	Age	Points
1	Anna Van Der Breggen	Netherlands	Rabobank-Liv Woman Cycling Team	25	1257.75
2	Elizabeth Armitstead	Great Britain	Boels–Dolmans	27	1024.5
3	Jolien D'Hoore	Belgium	Wiggle–Honda	25	962
4	Emma Johansson	Sweden	Orica–GreenEDGE	32	928
5	Elisa Longo Borghini	Italy	Wiggle–Honda	24	864
6	Ashleigh Moolman-Pasio	South Africa	Bigla Pro Cycling Team	30	764.17
7	Lisa Brennauer	Germany	Velocio–SRAM	27	725
8	Megan Guarnier	United States	Boels–Dolmans	30	719.67
9	Kirsten Wild	Netherlands	Team Hitec Products	33	690.25
10	Lucinda Brand	Netherlands	Rabobank-Liv Woman Cycling Team	26	648.75
11	Alena Amialiusik	Belarus	Velocio–SRAM	26	644
12	Katarzyna Niewiadoma	Poland	Rabobank-Liv Woman Cycling Team	21	607
13	Ellen van Dijk	Netherlands	Boels–Dolmans	28	542.25
14	Amy Pieters	Netherlands	Team Liv–Plantur	24	506.5
15	Shelley Olds	United States	Alé–Cipollini	35	481
16	Christine Majerus	Luxembourg	Boels–Dolmans	28	473.5
17	Annemiek van Vleuten	Netherlands	Bigla Pro Cycling Team	33	473
18	Pauline Ferrand-Prévot	France	Rabobank-Liv Woman Cycling Team	23	467
19	Elena Cecchini	Italy	Lotto–Soudal Ladies	23	465
20	Lauren Stephens	United States	Team TIBCO–SVB	29	452
21	Giorgia Bronzini	Italy	Wiggle–Honda	32	446
22	Trixi Worrack	Germany	Velocio–SRAM	34	399
23	Evelyn Stevens	United States	Boels–Dolmans	32	358.92
24	Tiffany Cromwell	Australia	Velocio–SRAM	27	353
25	Chloe Hosking	Australia	Wiggle–Honda	25	333
26	Lauren Kitchen	Australia	Team Hitec Products	25	322.67
27	Katrin Garfoot	Australia	Orica–GreenEDGE	34	317.92
28	Amber Neben	United States	BePink–La Classica	40	301
29	Lotta Lepistö	Finland	Bigla Pro Cycling Team	26	293
30	Karol-Ann Canuel	Canada	Velocio–SRAM	27	288
31	Leah Kirchmann	Canada	Optum–KBS	25	287
32	Roxane Fournier	France	Poitou-Charentes.Futuroscope.86	24	262
33	Barbara Guarischi	Italy	Velocio–SRAM	25	259
34	Joëlle Numainville	Canada	Bigla Pro Cycling Team	28	244.5
35	Ann-Sophie Duyck	Belgium	Topsport Vlaanderen–Pro-Duo	28	229
36	Amanda Spratt	Australia	Orica–GreenEDGE	28	228.75
37	Chantal Blaak	Netherlands	Boels–Dolmans	26	225.5
38	Tatiana Antoshina	Russia		33	225
39	Tayler Wiles	United States	Velocio–SRAM	26	210.67
40	Eugenia Bujak	Poland	BTC City Ljubljana	26	207
41	Coryn Rivera	United States	UnitedHealthcare	23	202
42	Valentina Scandolara	Italy	Orica–GreenEDGE	25	194
43	Thalita de Jong	Netherlands	Rabobank-Liv Woman Cycling Team	22	191
44	Floortje Mackaij	Netherlands	Team Liv–Plantur	20	190.5
45	Carmen Small	United States	Bigla Pro Cycling Team	35	180.5
46	Jolanda Neff	Switzerland	Servetto Footon	22	175
47	Pascale Jeuland	France	Poitou-Charentes.Futuroscope.86	28	174
48	Linda Melanie Villumsen	New Zealand	UnitedHealthcare	30	173.33
49	Mayuko Hagiwara	Japan	Wiggle–Honda	29	166
50	Lizzie Williams	Australia	Orica–GreenEDGE	32	163.25
51	Sabrina Stultiens	Netherlands	Team Liv–Plantur	22	161
52	Claudia Häusler	Germany	Team Liv–Plantur	30	152.5
53	Mara Abbott	United States	Wiggle–Honda	30	149
54	Hannah Barnes	Great Britain	UnitedHealthcare	22	148
55	Anouska Koster	Netherlands	Rabobank-Liv Woman Cycling Team	22	147.75
56	Annalisa Cucinotta	Italy	Alé–Cipollini	29	147
57	Élise Delzenne	France	Velocio–SRAM	26	146
58	Lucy Garner	Great Britain	Team Liv–Plantur	21	142
59	Ilaria Sanguineti	Italy	BePink–La Classica	21	139.25
60	Flávia Oliveira	Brazil	Alé–Cipollini	34	139
61	Natalie Van Gogh	Netherlands	Parkhotel Valkenburg Continental Team	41	137
62	Katie Hall	United States	UnitedHealthcare	28	137
63	Emilie Moberg	Norway	Team Hitec Products	24	133.75
64	Hanna Solovey	Ukraine		23	132
65	Roxane Knetemann	Netherlands	Rabobank-Liv Woman Cycling Team	28	129.75
66	Gracie Elvin	Australia	Orica–GreenEDGE	27	127.25
67	Lauren Komanski	United States	Twenty16 p/b Sho-Air	30	125.67
68	Sheyla Gutiérrez Ruiz	Spain	Lointek	21	125
69	Tetyana Ryabchenko	Ukraine	Inpa Sottoli Giusfredi	26	124
70	Marlies Mejías Garcia	Cuba		23	120
71	Janneke Ensing	Netherlands	Parkhotel Valkenburg Continental Team	29	113
72	Małgorzata Jasińska	Poland	Alé–Cipollini	31	112.5
73	Maria Giulia Confalonieri	Italy	Alé–Cipollini	22	109.5
74	Kristin Armstrong	United States	Twenty16 p/b Sho-Air	42	108
75	Edwige Pitel	France	S.C. Michela Fanini Rox	48	104
76	Marta Bastianelli	Italy	Aromitalia Vaiano	28	104
77	Ting Ying Huang	Chinese Taipei		25	103
78	Zhao Juan Meng	Hong Kong, China	China Chongming–Liv–Champion System	26	102
79	Martina Ritter	Austria	BTC City Ljubljana	33	102
80	Lise Olivier	South Africa		32	100.67
81	Kim De Baat	Netherlands	Lensworld.eu–Zannata	24	99
82	Rachel Neylan	Australia	Orica–GreenEDGE	33	98.67
83	Polona Batagelj	Slovenia	BTC City Ljubljana	26	97
84	An-Li Kachelhoffer	South Africa		28	96.67
85	Brianna Walle	United States	Optum–KBS	31	96
86	Audrey Cordon	France	Wiggle–Honda	26	95
87	Jasmin Glaesser	Canada	Optum–KBS	23	94
88	Svetlana Vasilieva	Russia		20	94
89	Marta Tagliaferro	Italy	Alé–Cipollini	26	93.5
90	Monique Van De Ree	Netherlands		27	93
91	Sara Mustonen	Sweden	Team Liv–Plantur	34	91.5
92	Emily Collins	New Zealand	Team TIBCO–SVB	25	89
93	Anastasiia Iakovenko	Russia		20	88
94	Cherise Stander	South Africa		26	85
95	Kelly Druyts	Belgium	Topsport Vlaanderen–Pro-Duo	26	85
96	Fanny Riberot	France	Lointek	32	85
97	Gleydimar Tapia	Venezuela		23	82
98	Carlee Taylor	Australia	Lotto–Soudal Ladies	26	79
99	Elena Kuchinskaya	Russia	Servetto Footon	31	75
100	Yennifer Cesar	Venezuela		26	72

== UCI Teams Ranking ==
Final ranking of the 2015 UCI women's teams.

#	Team	Code	Nation	Points
1	Rabobank-Liv Woman Cycling Team	DSB	Netherlands	3120.5
2	Boels–Dolmans	DLT	Netherlands	2929.92
3	Wiggle–Honda	WHT	Great Britain	2735
4	Velocio–SRAM	VEL	Germany	2321
5	Bigla Pro Cycling Team	BCT	Switzerland	1774.67
6	Orica–GreenEDGE	OGE	Australia	1768.67
7	Team Hitec Products	HPU	Norway	1275.17
8	Team Liv–Plantur	TLP	Netherlands	1010.5
9	Alé–Cipollini	ALE	Italy	879.5
10	UnitedHealthcare	UHC	United States	770.33
11	Team TIBCO–SVB	TIB	United States	618
12	Lotto–Soudal Ladies	LBL	Belgium	615
13	Optum–KBS	OPW	United States	612
14	Poitou-Charentes.Futuroscope.86	FUT	France	578
15	BTC City Ljubljana	BTC	Slovenia	549
16	BePink–La Classica	BPK	Italy	527.5
17	Twenty 16 p/b Sho-Air	T16	United States	465.34
18	Topsport Vlaanderen–Pro-Duo	VLL	Belgium	407
19	Servetto Footon	SEF	Italy	350
20	Parkhotel Valkenburg Continental Team	PHV	Netherlands	309
21	Inpa Sottoli Giusfredi	ISG	Italy	302
22	Lointek	LTK	Spain	264
23	Lensworld.eu–Zannata	LWZ	Belgium	214
24	Aromitalia Vaiano	VAI	Italy	196
25	S.C. Michela Fanini Rox	MIC	Italy	185
26	China Chongming–Liv–Champion System	GPC	Hong Kong, China	131
27	Matrix Fitness Pro Cycling	MAT	Great Britain	82
28	Astana-Acca Due O	ASA	Kazakhstan	67
29	Itau Shimano Ladies Power Team	SLP	Argentina	32
30	Top Girls Fassa Bortolo	TOG	Italy	31
31	Team Rytger	TRY	Denmark	27
32	BMW p/b Happy Tooth Dental	BMW	United States	25.67
33	Bizkaia–Durango	BPD	Spain	24
34	Feminine Cycling Team	FCT	Germany	16
35	Xirayas de San Luis	XSL	Argentina	15
36	No Radunion Vitalogic	NOE	Austria	8

== Nations Ranking ==
Final ranking 2015

	Nation	Code	Points
1	Netherlands	NED	3645.5
2	United States	USA	2312.59
3	Italy	ITA	2228
4	Australia	AUS	1555.34
5	Great Britain	GBR	1413.5
6	Belgium	BEL	1390.5
7	Germany	GER	1374
8	France	FRA	1153
9	South Africa	RSA	1076.51
10	Sweden	SWE	1035.5
11	Poland	POL	1012.5
12	Canada	CAN	980.5
13	Belarus	BLR	665
14	Russia	RUS	540
15	Luxembourg	LUX	488.5
16	New Zealand	NZL	340
17	Finland	FIN	324
18	Brazil	BRA	320
19	Ukraine	UKR	292
20	Norway	NOR	270.25
21	Spain	ESP	250
22	Venezuela	VEN	237
23	Switzerland	SUI	234.5
24	Cuba	CUB	228
25	Japan	JPN	206
26	Chinese Taipei	TPE	155
27	Slovenia	SLO	139
28	Hong Kong, China	HKG	130
29	Lithuania	LTU	121
30	Austria	AUT	119
31	Chile	CHI	114
31	Mexico	MEX	114
33	Ethiopia	ETH	98
34	Thailand	THA	96
35	Denmark	DEN	91
36	Costa Rica	CRC	82
37	Azerbaijan	AZE	72
38	Korea	KOR	64
39	Colombia	COL	54
40	Czech Republic	CZE	51
41	Eritrea	ERI	50.01
42	Argentina	ARG	45
43	Vietnam	VIE	43
43	Croatia	CRO	43
45	Namibia	NAM	42.01
46	Mauritius	MRI	42
47	El Salvador	ESA	41
48	Romania	ROU	38.25
49	Nigeria	NGR	38
49	Portugal	POR	38
51	Ireland	IRL	36
51	Mongolia	MGL	36
51	Latvia	LAT	36
54	Serbia	SRB	32
54	Hungary	HUN	32
54	Morocco	MAR	32
54	China	CHN	32
54	Iran	IRI	32
54	Turkey	TUR	32
54	Syria	SYR	32
54	Kuwait	KUW	32
54	Bolivia	BOL	32
54	Kazakhstan	KAZ	32
64	Cyprus	CYP	31
64	Guam	GUM	31
64	Israel	ISR	31
64	Greece	GRE	31
68	Guatemala	GUA	29
69	Puerto Rico	PUR	28
69	Bermuda	BER	28
69	Antigua and Barbuda	ANT	28
72	Belize	BIZ	27
72	Tunisia	TUN	27
74	Bosnia and Herzegovina	BIH	26
75	Panama	PAN	25
75	Malaysia	MAS	25
77	Estonia	EST	24
78	Zimbabwe	ZIM	22
78	Ecuador	ECU	22
80	Macedonia	MKD	20
81	Central African Republic	CAF	15
82	Rwanda	RWA	14
83	Aruba	ARU	13
83	Philippines	PHI	13
83	Algeria	ALG	13
86	Egypt	EGY	6

Preceded by 2014	UCI Women's Road Rankings; 2015	Succeeded by
