= 2016 Ladies Tour of Qatar =

Race details
- Dates: 2–5 February
- Stages: 4
- Distance: 402 km (250 mi)
- Winning time: 9h 59' 25"

Results
Jersey awarded to the overall winner	Winner	Trixi Worrack (GER)	(Canyon SRAM)
	Second	Romy Kasper (GER)	(Boels–Dolmans)
	Third	Ellen van Dijk (NED)	(Boels–Dolmans)

The 2016 Ladies Tour of Qatar was the 8th edition of the Ladies Tour of Qatar. It was organised by the Qatar Cycling Federation with technical and sports-related assistance from Amaury Sport Organisation (A.S.O.) under the regulations of the Union Cycliste Internationale (category 2.1). It took place from 2 February until 5 February 2016 and consisted of 4 stages. 15 teams of 6 riders took part.

== Teams ==
=== UCI Women's Teams ===
- Team Hitec Products
- Wiggle High5
- Boels–Dolmans
- Canyon–SRAM
- Alé–Cipollini
- Orica–AIS
- Rabobank-Liv Woman Cycling Team
- Cylance Pro Cycling
- Team Liv-Plantur
- UnitedHealthcare
- Lares–Waowdeals
- China Chongming–Liv–Champion System

=== National Teams ===
- Australia
- France
- Italy

== Route ==
Stage characteristics and winners
Stage	Date	Course	Distance	Type	Stage winner
1	2 February	Katara Cultural Village to Qatar University	97 km (60 mi)	Flat stage	Kirsten Wild (NED)
2	3 February	Sheikh Faisal Bin Qassim Al Thani Museum to Al Khor Corniche	120 km (75 mi)	Flat stage	Katrin Garfoot (AUS)
3	4 February	Al Zubara Fort to Al Shamal	112 km (70 mi)	Medium mountain stage	Ellen van Dijk (NED)
4	5 February	Aspire Zone to Doha Corniche	73 km (45 mi)	Flat stage	Chloe Hosking (AUS)

== Stages ==
=== Stage 1 ===
2 February 2016 – Qatar University to Qatar University, 97 km (60.3 mi)

Stage 1 Result

	Rider	Team	Time
1	Kirsten Wild (NED)	Team Hitec Products	2h 19' 04"
2	Annalisa Cucinotta (ITA)	Alé–Cipollini	s.t.
3	Lizzie Williams (AUS)	Liv AlUla Jayco	s.t.
4	Chantal Blaak (NED)	Boels–Dolmans	s.t.
5	Shelley Olds (USA)	Cylance Pro Cycling	s.t.
6	Susanna Zorzi (ITA)	Italy (national)	s.t.
7	Monique van de Ree (NED)	Lares–Waowdeals	s.t.
8	Barbara Guarischi (ITA)	Canyon SRAM	s.t.
9	Katrin Garfoot (AUS)	Liv AlUla Jayco	s.t.
10	Sara Mustonen (SWE)	Team Liv-Plantur	s.t.

General Classification after Stage 1

	Rider	Team	Time
1	Kirsten Wild (NED)	Team Hitec Products	2h 18' 51"
2	Annalisa Cucinotta (ITA)	Alé–Cipollini	+7"
3	Lizzie Williams (AUS)	Orica–AIS	+9"
4	Chloe Hosking (AUS)	Wiggle High5	+9"
5	Chantal Blaak (NED)	Boels–Dolmans	+10"
6	Marta Tagliaferro (ITA)	Alé–Cipollini	+11"
7	Shelley Olds (USA)	Cylance Pro Cycling	+13"
8	Susanna Zorzi (ITA)	Italy (national)	+13"
9	Monique van de Ree (NED)	Lares–Waowdeals	+13"
10	Barbara Guarischi (ITA)	Canyon SRAM	+13"

=== Stage 2 ===
3 February 2016 – Sheikh Faisal Museum to Al Khor Corniche, 120 km (74.6 mi)

Stage 2 Result

	Rider	Team	Time
1	Katrin Garfoot (NED)	Orica–AIS	3h 07' 13"
2	Trixi Worrack (GER)	Canyon SRAM	+13"
3	Amy Pieters (NED)	Wiggle High5	+13"
4	Romy Kasper (GER)	Boels–Dolmans	+13"
5	Chloe Hosking (AUS)	Wiggle High5	+58"
6	Ellen van Dijk (NED)	Boels–Dolmans	+58"
7	Barbara Guarischi (ITA)	Canyon SRAM	+58"
8	Elisa Longo Borghini (ITA)	Wiggle High5	+58"
9	Gracie Elvin (AUS)	Orica–AIS	+58"
10	Tiffany Cromwell (AUS)	Canyon SRAM	+58"

General Classification after Stage 2

	Rider	Team	Time
1	Katrin Garfoot (NED)	Orica–AIS	5h 26' 07"
2	Trixi Worrack (GER)	Canyon SRAM	+17"
3	Amy Pieters (NED)	Wiggle High5	+19"
4	Romy Kasper (GER)	Boels–Dolmans	+23"
5	Chloe Hosking (AUS)	Wiggle High5	+1' 02"
6	Gracie Elvin (AUS)	Orica–AIS	+1' 07"
7	Tiffany Cromwell (AUS)	Canyon SRAM	+58"
7	Barbara Guarischi (ITA)	Canyon SRAM	+1' 08"
8	Ellen van Dijk (NED)	Boels–Dolmans	+1' 08"
9	Tiffany Cromwell (AUS)	Canyon SRAM	+1' 08"
10	Elisa Longo Borghini (ITA)	Wiggle High5	+1' 08"

=== Stage 3 ===
4 February 2016 – Al Zubarah Fort to Al Shamal, 112 km (69.6 mi)

A year after her last stage win, also at Al Shamal, Ellen van Dijk made the best of her time-trialling skills to conquer her third success in Qatar. The Dutch rider from Boels-Dolmans, part of a breakaway group that took off as soon as the first few kilometres of a windswept day, powered away in the last two kilometres of the race. She was never to be caught and triumphantly crossed the line on her own, clear of Kirsten Wild and Lauretta Hanson. The golden jersey changes shoulders and goes to Germany's Trixi Worrack.

Stage 3 Result

	Rider	Team	Time
1	Ellen van Dijk (NED)	Boels–Dolmans	2h 48' 56"
2	Kirsten Wild (NED)	Hitec Products	+7"
3	Lauretta Hanson (AUS)	Australia national team	+7"
4	Anouska Koster (NED)	Rabobank-Liv Woman Cycling Team	+7"
5	Trixi Worrack (GER)	Canyon SRAM	+8"
6	Gracie Elvin (AUS)	Liv AlUla Jayco	+11"
7	Tiffany Cromwell (AUS)	Canyon SRAM	+13"
8	Romy Kasper (GER)	Boels–Dolmans	+19"
9	Shelley Olds (USA)	Cylance Pro Cycling	+24"
10	Christine Majerus (LUX)	Boels–Dolmans	+45"

General Classification after Stage 3

	Rider	Team	Time
1	Trixi Worrack (GER)	Canyon SRAM	8h 15' 28"
2	Romy Kasper (GER)	Boels–Dolmans	+17"
3	Ellen van Dijk (NED)	Boels–Dolmans	+31"
4	Katrin Garfoot (NED)	Orica–AIS	+34"
5	Gracie Elvin (AUS)	Orica–AIS	+50"
6	Amy Pieters (NED)	Wiggle High5	+53"
7	Tiffany Cromwell (AUS)	Canyon SRAM	+56"
8	Lauretta Hanson (AUS)	Australia national team	+1' 32"
9	Anouska Koster (NED)	Rabobank-Liv Woman Cycling Team	+1' 34"
10	Chloe Hosking (AUS)	Wiggle High5	+1' 42"

=== Stage 4 ===
5 February 2016 – Aspire Zone to Doha Corniche, 73 km (45.4 mi)

Stage 4 Result

	Rider	Team	Time
1	Chloe Hosking (AUS)	Wiggle High5	1h 46' 09"
2	Kirsten Wild (NED)	Hitec Products	s.t.
3	Monique van de Ree (NED)	Lares–Waowdeals	s.t.
4	Anouska Koster (NED)	Rabobank-Liv Woman Cycling Team	s.t.
5	Shelley Olds (USA)	Cylance Pro Cycling	s.t.
6	Marta Tagliaferro (ITA)	Alé–Cipollini	s.t.
7	Kimberley Wells (AUS)	Australia national team	s.t.
8	Arianna Fidanza (ITA)	Italy national team	s.t.
9	Lizzie Williams (AUS)	Orica–AIS	s.t.
10	Chantal Blaak (NED)	Boels–Dolmans	s.t.

General Classification after Stage 4

	Rider	Team	Time
1	Trixi Worrack (GER)	Canyon SRAM	10h 01' 37"
2	Romy Kasper (GER)	Boels–Dolmans	+17"
3	Ellen van Dijk (NED)	Boels–Dolmans	+28"
4	Katrin Garfoot (NED)	Orica–AIS	+43"
5	Gracie Elvin (AUS)	Orica–AIS	+50"
6	Amy Pieters (NED)	Wiggle High5	+53"
7	Tiffany Cromwell (AUS)	Canyon SRAM	+56"
8	Anouska Koster (NED)	Rabobank-Liv Woman Cycling Team	+1' 32"
9	Chloe Hosking (AUS)	Wiggle High5	+1' 32"
10	Lauretta Hanson (AUS)	Australia national team	+1' 32"

== Classification leadership table ==
Stage	Winner	General classification	Points classification	Young rider classification	Teams classification
1	Kirsten Wild	Kirsten Wild	Kirsten Wild	Arianna Fidanza	Orica–AIS
2	Katrin Garfoot	Katrin Garfoot	Kirsten Wild	Anouska Koster	Wiggle High5
3	Ellen van Dijk	Trixi Worrack	Kirsten Wild	Lauretta Hanson	Canyon–SRAM
4	Chloe Hosking	Trixi Worrack	Kirsten Wild	Anouska Koster	Canyon–SRAM
Final		Trixi Worrack	Kirsten Wild	Anouska Koster	Canyon–SRAM

== Broadcasting ==
- beIN Sports (live)

== See also ==
- 2016 in women's road cycling
