= 2015 Gooik–Geraardsbergen–Gooik =

Race details
- Dates: 31 May
- Distance: 136 km (85 mi)
- Winning time: 3h 45' 02"

Results
| | Winner | Gracie Elvin (AUS) | (Orica–AIS) |
| | Second | Ellen van Dijk (NED) | (Boels–Dolmans) |
| | Third | Mayuko Hagiwara (JPN) | (Wiggle–Honda) |

The 2015 Gooik–Geraardsbergen–Gooik was a one-day women's cycle race held in Belgium, starting and finishing in Gooik, on 31 May 2015. The race had a UCI rating of 1.1. The race was won by Australia's Gracie Elvin.

== Results ==
Result
| Rank | Rider | Team | Time |
|---|---|---|---|
| 1 | Gracie Elvin (AUS) | Orica–AIS | 3h 45' 02" |
| 2 | Ellen van Dijk (NED) | Boels–Dolmans | + 0" |
| 3 | Mayuko Hagiwara (JPN) | Wiggle–Honda | + 1" |
| 4 | Amy Pieters (NED) | Team Liv–Plantur | + 29" |
| 5 | Chantal Blaak (NED) | Boels–Dolmans | + 29" |
| 6 | Anouska Koster (NED) | Rabobank-Liv Woman Cycling Team | + 29" |
| 7 | Emma Johansson (SWE) | Orica–AIS | + 29" |
| 8 | Demi de Jong (NED) | Boels–Dolmans | + 29" |
| 9 | Sofie De Vuyst (BEL) | Lensworld.eu–Zannata | + 29" |
| 10 | Dani King (GBR) | Wiggle–Honda | + 29" |

== See also ==
- 2015 in women's road cycling
