= Demi de Jong =

Dutch cyclist (born 1995)

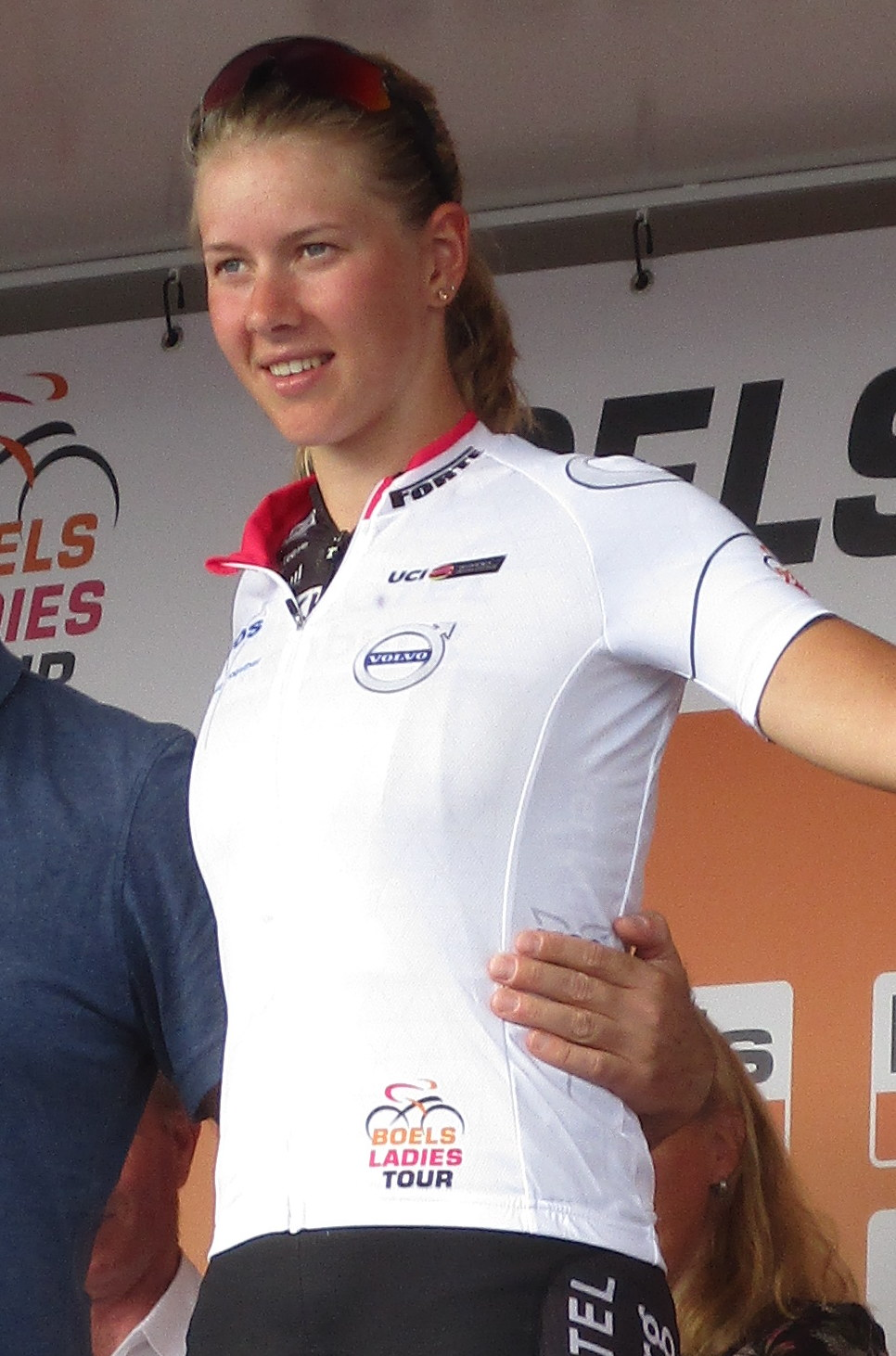
- De Jong at the 2017 Holland Ladies Tour

Personal information
- Full name: Demi de Jong
- Born: 11 February 1995 (age 31) Ossendrecht, Netherlands

Cycling career
- Sport: Cycling
- Current team: VolkerWessels Women Cyclingteam
- Discipline: Road
- Role: Rider

Professional teams
- 2014–2016: Boels–Dolmans
- 2017: Parkhotel Valkenburg–Destil
- 2018–2019: Lotto–Soudal Ladies
- 2020–2021: Chevalmeire Cycling Team
- 2022: Parkhotel Valkenburg

Demi de Jong (born 11 February 1995) is a Dutch former road cyclist. As a junior, de Jong won the bronze medal in the women's junior time trial at the 2012 UCI Road World Championships. She started her professional career in 2014 at Boels–Dolmans. In her last season she rode for UCI Women's Continental Team VolkerWessels Women Cyclingteam, but ended her career in July 2022 due to a knee injury. She is the younger sister of the 2016 Cyclo-cross World Champion, Thalita de Jong.

== Major results ==
2012
2nd Time trial, National Junior Road Championships
3rd Time trial, UCI Junior Road World Championships
2013
2nd Time trial, National Junior Road Championships
4th Overall Junior Energiewacht Tour

1st Stage 2

6th Time trial, UCI Junior Road World Championships
2015
National Road Championships

1st Under-23 road race
5th Road race

6th Road race, UEC European Under-23 Road Championships
8th Gooik–Geraardsbergen–Gooik
2016
5th Le Samyn des Dames
5th Trofee Maarten Wynants
6th Erondegemse Pijl
2017
1st Young rider classification Holland Ladies Tour
3rd 7-Dorpenomloop Aalburg
10th Gooik–Geraardsbergen–Gooik
2018
5th Gooik–Geraardsbergen–Gooik
2019
3rd Le Samyn des Dames

== See also ==
- 2014 Boels–Dolmans season
- 2015 Boels–Dolmans season
