= 2019 Brabantse Pijl Dames =

Race details
- Dates: 17 April 2019
- Distance: 136.7 km (84.9 mi)
- Winning time: 3h 28' 56"

Results
	Winner	Sofie De Vuyst (BEL)	(Parkhotel Valkenburg)
	Second	Marta Cavalli (ITA)	(Valcar–Cylance)
	Third	Coryn Labecki (USA)	(Team Sunweb)

The 2019 Brabantse Pijl was the second edition of the race under this name. It was held on 17 April 2019 over a distance of 136.7 kilometers (84.9 miles) starting and finishing in Gooik. It was rated by the UCI as a 1.1 category race.

== Result ==
Result
Rank	Rider	Team	Time
1	Sofie De Vuyst (BEL)	Parkhotel Valkenburg	3:28:56
2	Marta Cavalli (ITA)	Valcar–Cylance	+ 0"
3	Coryn Labecki (USA)	Team Sunweb	+ 0"
4	Elena Pirrone (ITA)	Astana	+ 0"
5	Floortje Mackaij (NED)	Team Sunweb	+ 0"
6	Julie Norman Leth (DEN)	Bigla Pro Cycling	+ 0"
7	Letizia Borghesi (ITA)	Aromitalia–Basso Bikes–Vaiano	+ 7"
8	Leah Kirchmann (CAN)	Team Sunweb	+ 23"
9	Vittoria Guazzini (ITA)	Valcar–Cylance	+ 23"
10	Marta Lach (POL)	CCC - Liv	+ 1' 11"

== See also ==
- 2019 in women's road cycling
