= Nadezhda Geneleva =

Kazakhstani cyclist

Personal information
- Born: 14 April 1997 (age 29)

Cycling career
- Sport: Cycling
- Role: Rider

Nadezhda Geneleva (born 14 April 1997) is a Kazakhstani professional racing cyclist who rides for Astana Women's Team.

== Major results ==
2014
1st Asian Cycling Championships, Junior Road race
2015
2nd Asian Cycling Championships, Junior Time trial
3rd Points Race, Track Clubs ACC Cup
2016
Track Clubs ACC Cup

2nd Omnium
2nd Team Pursuit (with Faina Potapova, Tatyana Geneleva and Yekaterina Yuraitis)
3rd Points Race

2nd Team Pursuit, Track Asia Cup (with Rinata Akhmetcha, Zhanerke Sanakbayeva and Yekaterina Yuraitis)
National Road Championships

5th Road race
5th Time trial

2017
8th Asian Cycling Championships, Under-23 Road race

== See also ==
- List of 2016 UCI Women's Teams and riders
