= Happiness Okafor =

Nigerian cyclist

Personal information
- Born: Delta State, Nigeria

Cycling career
- Sport: Cycling
- Disciplines: Road and Track
- Role: Rider
- Rider type: All rounder
Medal record
Women's cycling
Representing Nigeria
All-Africa Games
Gold medal – first place	2015 Congo Brazzaville	Time trial

Happiness Okafor is a Nigerian professional cyclist. She won a gold medal while representing Nigeria in the women's time trial cycling event alongside Rosemary Marcus, Glory Odiase, and Gripa Tombrapa at the 2015 All-Africa Games in Congo Brazzaville.
