= Tour of Taiyuan International Women's Road Cycling Race =

Race details
- Date: May
- Region: China
- Discipline: Road
- Competition: UCI 1.2 (2019–)
- Type: Stage race

History
- First edition: 2019
- Editions: 1 (as of 2019–)
- First winner: Arianna Fidanza (ITA)
- Most wins: No repeat winners
- Most recent: Arianna Fidanza (ITA)

The Tour of Taiyuan International Women's Road Cycling Race is an annual professional road bicycle race for women in China.

== Winners ==
Year	Country	Rider	Team
2018	Italy	Arianna Fidanza	High Ambition 2020 Japan
