= Gooik–Geraardsbergen–Gooik =

Belgian one-day road cycling race

Race details
- Date: End May / begin June
- Region: Belgium
- Discipline: Road
- Type: One-day
- Organiser: Wielerclub Sprinters Gooik
- Race director: Eddy Van Snick

History
- First edition: 2011
- Editions: 8
- Final edition: 2018
- First winner: Marianne Vos (NED)
- Most wins: Marianne Vos (NED) (3 wins)
- Final winner: Sarah Roy (AUS)

Gooik–Geraardsbergen–Gooik was an elite women's professional one-day road bicycle race held between Gooik and Geraardsbergen in Belgium and was rated by the UCI as a 1.1 race.

== Past winners ==
Year	First	Second	Third
2011	Marianne Vos (NED)	Marieke van Wanroij (NED)	Amy Pieters (NED)
2012	Liesbet De Vocht (BEL)	Sharon Laws (GBR)	Elisa Longo Borghini (ITA)
2013	Emma Johansson (SWE)	Maaike Polspoel (BEL)	Iris Slappendel (NED)
2014	Marianne Vos (NED)	Emma Johansson (SWE)	Elisa Longo Borghini (ITA)
2015	Gracie Elvin (AUS)	Ellen van Dijk (NED)	Mayuko Hagiwara (JPN)
2016	Gracie Elvin (AUS)	Lotte Kopecky (BEL)	Élise Delzenne (FRA)
2017	Marianne Vos (NED)	Ellen van Dijk (NED)	Maria Giulia Confalonieri (ITA)
2018	Sarah Roy (AUS)	Gracie Elvin (AUS)	Elisa Balsamo (ITA)
2019	Race cancelled		
