= 2018 Brabantse Pijl Dames Gooik =

Race details
- Dates: 11 April 2018
- Distance: 136.8 km (85.0 mi)
- Winning time: 3h 37' 56"

Results
	Winner	Marta Bastianelli (ITA)	(Alé–Cipollini)
	Second	Leah Kirchmann (CAN)	(Team Sunweb)
	Third	Marianne Vos (NED)	(WaowDeals Pro Cycling)

The 2018 Brabantse Pijl was the first edition of the race under its new name. The name was changed in order to match with the men's event. It was held on 11 April 2018 over a distance of 136.8 kilometres (85.0 miles). The route was largely unchanged from editions held under the old name so continued to start and finish in Gooik, rather than finishing in Overijse like the men. It was rated by the UCI as a 1.1 category race.

== Race ==
The bunch had been reduced to a small group at the end off the race where Marta Bastianelli pipped Leah Kirchmann and Marianne Vos in the sprint for the line.

== Result ==
Result
Rank	Rider	Team	Time
1	Marta Bastianelli (ITA)	Alé–Cipollini	3:37:56
2	Leah Kirchmann (CAN)	Team Sunweb	+ 0"
3	Marianne Vos (NED)	WaowDeals Pro Cycling	+ 0"
4	Jolien D'hoore (BEL)	Mitchelton–Scott	+ 0"
5	Maria Giulia Confalonieri (ITA)	Valcar–PBM	+ 0"
6	Rasa Leleivytė (LIT)	Aromitalia Vaiano	+ 0"
7	Kelly Druyts (BEL)	Doltcini–Van Eyck Sport	+ 0"
8	Chiara Consonni (ITA)	Valcar–PBM	+ 0"
9	Monique van de Ree (NED)	WaowDeals Pro Cycling	+ 0"
10	Sofie De Vuyst (BEL)	Doltcini–Van Eyck Sport	+ 0"

== See also ==
- 2018 in women's road cycling
