= 2017 Belgium Tour =

2017 Lotto-Belisol Belgium Tour
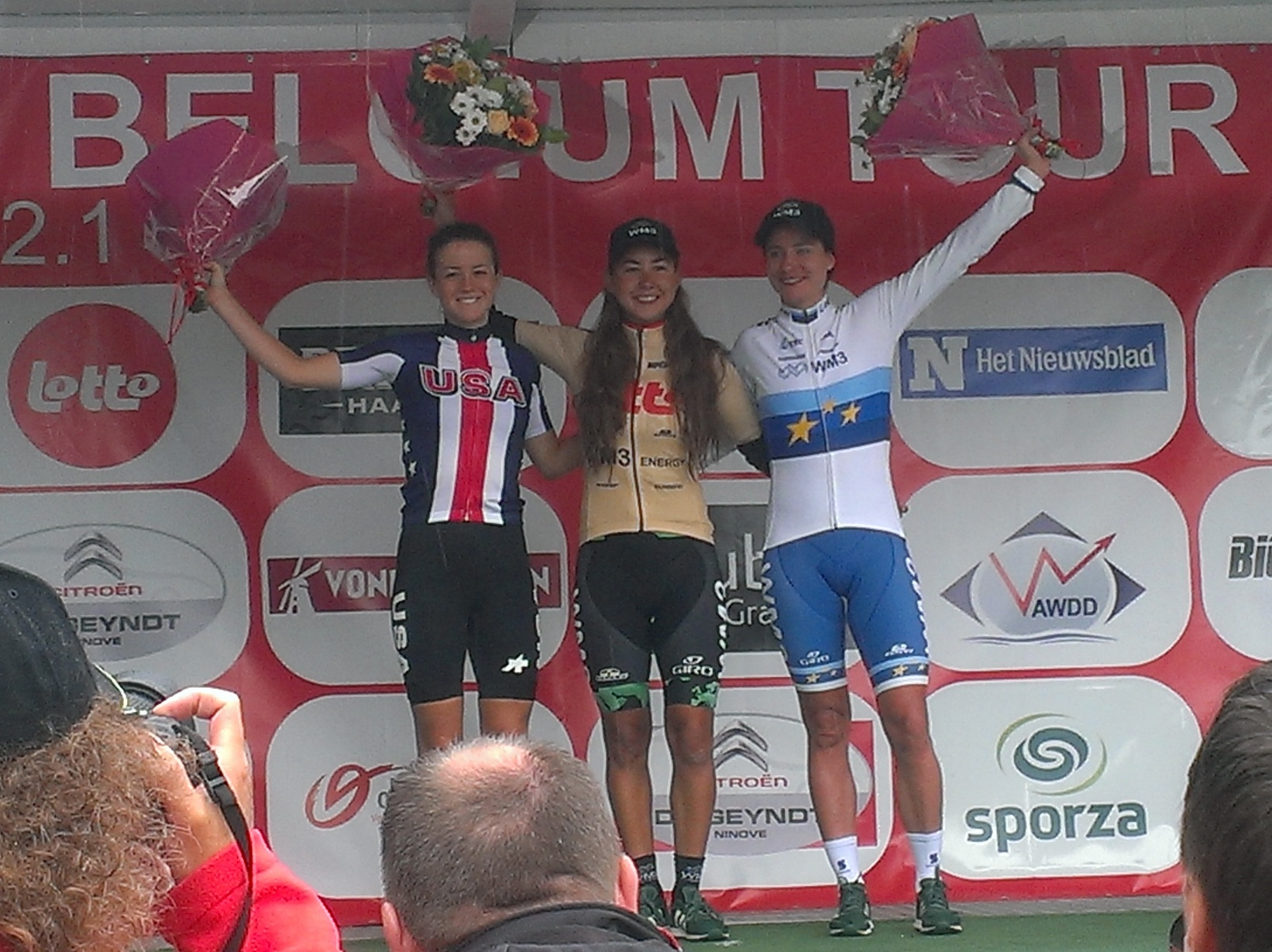
- Final podium: 2. Winder 1. Koster 3. Vos

Race details
- Dates: 5–8 September 2017
- Stages: 4

Results
Jersey awarded to the overall winner	Winner	Anouska Koster (NED)	(WM3 Energie)
	Second	Ruth Winder (USA)	(UnitedHealthcare)
	Third	Marianne Vos (NED)	(WM3 Energie)
Jersey awarded to the points classification winner	Points	Marianne Vos (NED)	(WM3 Energie)
Jersey awarded to the mountains classification winner	Mountains	Vita Heine (NOR)	(Norway (National team))
Jersey awarded to the sprints classification winner	Sprints	Anouska Koster (NED)	(WM3 Energie)
	Team	WM3 Energie	

The 2017 Lotto-Belisol Belgium Tour is the fifth edition of the Lotto-Belisol Belgium Tour, previous called Lotto-Decca Tour, a women's cycle stage race in Belgium. The tour has an UCI rating of 2.1.

== Stages ==
List of stages
Stage	Date	Course	Distance	Type	Winner
P	5 September	Nieuwpoort to Nieuwpoort	4 km (2.5 mi)	Prologue	Jolien D'Hoore (BEL)
1	6 September	Meerbeke to Ninove	114 km (70.8 mi)	Flat stage	Marianne Vos (NED)
2	7 September	Herselt to Herselt	106.8 km (66.4 mi)	Flat stage	Jolien D'Hoore (BEL)
3	8 September	Geraardsbergen to Geraardsbergen	114 km (70.8 mi)	Flat stage	Anouska Koster (NED)
Total			338.8 km (210.5 mi)		

== Classification leadership ==
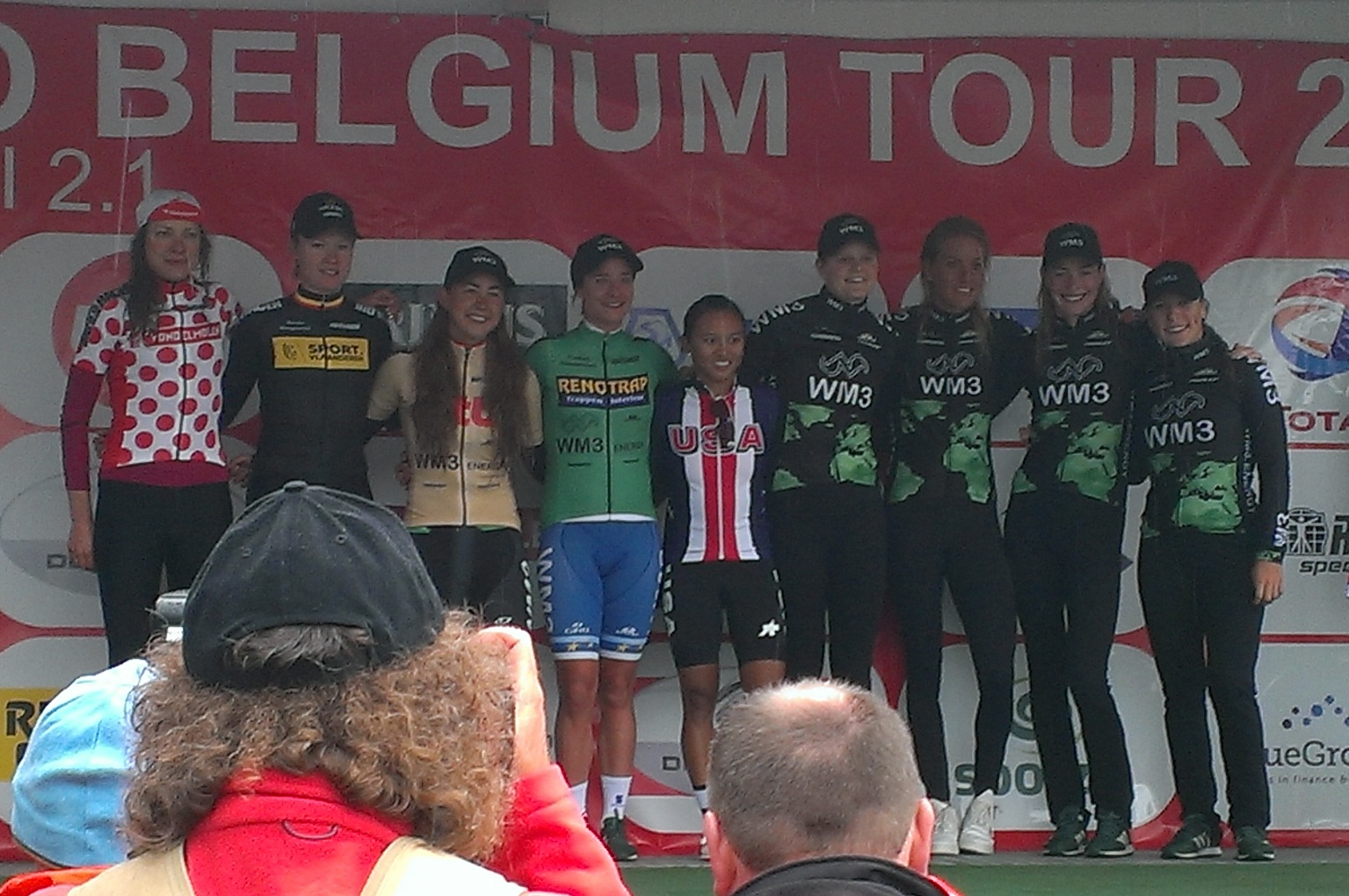
The final winners of the jerseys.

Stage	Winner	General classification	Points classification	Mountains classification	Young rider classification	Belgian Riders	Team classification
P	Jolien D'Hoore	Jolien D'Hoore	Jolien D'Hoore	Not awarded	Coryn Rivera	Jolien D'Hoore	Canyon//SRAM
1	Marianne Vos	Marianne Vos	Marianne Vos	Megan Guarnier	Coryn Rivera	Jolien D'Hoore	USA (National Team)
2	Jolien D'Hoore	Jolien D'Hoore	Jolien D'Hoore	Vita Heine	Coryn Rivera	Jolien D'Hoore	USA (National Team)
3	Anouska Koster	Anouska Koster	Marianne Vos	Vita Heine	Anouska Koster	Jolien D'Hoore	WM3 Energie
Final Classification		Anouska Koster	Marianne Vos	Vita Heine	Anouska Koster	Jolien D'Hoore	WM3 Energie

== See also ==
- 2017 in women's road cycling
