= Tatyana Geneleva =

Kazakhstani cyclist

Personal information
- Born: 14 April 1997 (age 29)

Cycling career
- Sport: Cycling
- Role: Rider

Tatyana Geneleva (born 14 April 1997) is a Kazakhstani professional racing cyclist who rides for Astana Women's Team.

== Major results ==
2015
3rd Individual Pursuit, Track Clubs ACC Cup
2016
2nd Team Pursuit, Track Clubs ACC Cup (with Nadezhda Geneleva, Faina Potapova and Yekaterina Yuraitis)
4th Time trial, National Road Championships
2017
National Road Championships

1st Road race
4th Road race

2018
3rd Time trial, National Road Championships

== See also ==
- List of 2016 UCI Women's Teams and riders
