= Matthew Keenan (commentator) =

Cycling commentator

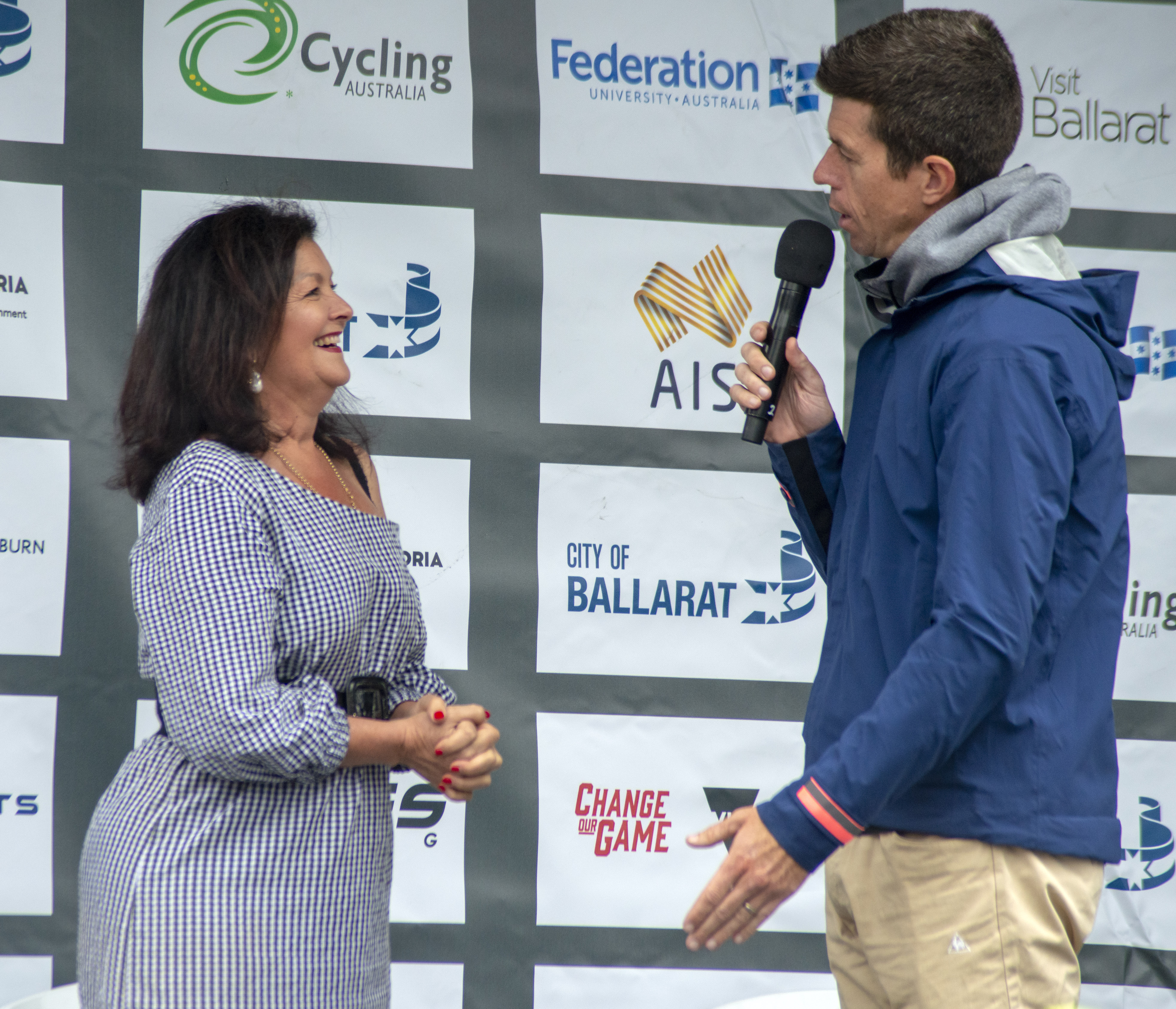
- Keenan conducting an interview at the Australia national road cycling championships in 2019
- Born: Australia
- Occupations: Cycling commentator and journalist
- Years active: 2003-present
- Employer(s): Seven Network (Australia) (—2023); SBS (Australia)
- Spouse: yes

Matthew Keenan is an Australian commentator and journalist who covers professional cycling.

Keenan commentates on major races Paris-Nice, Paris-Roubaix, Giro d'Italia, Tour de France, Tour Down Under, and Vuelta a España from location for ITV, and Australia's SBS. The rest he covers remotely at the SBS Sydney office.

Keenan and Gracie Elvin co-hosted the Seven Network broadcast of the 2023 Santos Women's Tour Down Under used by Peacock in the US. He provided commentary again for the 2024 edition.
