= Rosemary Marcus =

Nigerian cyclist

Personal information
- Born: Rivers State, Nigeria

Cycling career
- Sport: Cycling
- Disciplines: Road and Track
- Role: Rider
- Rider type: All rounder
Medal record
Representing Nigeria
Women's Cycling
All-Africa Games
Gold medal – first place	2015 Congo Brazzaville	Time trial

Rosemary Marcus is a female Nigerian professional cyclist. She won a gold medal while representing Nigeria in the women's time trial cycling event alongside Happiness Okafor, Glory Odiase, and Gripa Tombrapa at the 2015 All-Africa Games in Congo Brazzaville.
