= 2015 European Road Championships – Women's under-23 road race =

Women's under-23 road race
2015 European Road Championships
- UEC European Champion jersey

Race details
- Dates: 8 August 2015 in (Estonia) Tartu (EST)
- Stages: 1
- Distance: 124 km (77.05 mi)
- Winning time: 3h 16' 15"

Results
| | Winner | Katarzyna Niewiadoma (POL) |
| | Second | Ilaria Sanguineti (ITA) |
| | Third | Thalita de Jong (NED) |

The Women's under-23 road race at the 2015 European Road Championships took place on 8 August. The Championships were hosted by the Estonian city Tartu. The course was 124 km long. 76 cyclists competed in the time trial, of which 18 did not finish.

== Top 10 final classification ==
| Rank | Rider | Time |
|---|---|---|
| 1st place, gold medalist(s) | Katarzyna Niewiadoma (POL) | 3h 16' 15" |
| 2nd place, silver medalist(s) | Ilaria Sanguineti (ITA) | s.t. |
| 3rd place, bronze medalist(s) | Thalita de Jong (NED) | s.t. |
| 4 | Anouska Koster (NED) | s.t. |
| 5 | Riejanne Markus (NED) | + 10" |
| 6 | Demi de Jong (NED) | + 10" |
| 7 | Mieke Kröger (GER) | + 10" |
| 8 | Kelly Markus (NED) | + 10" |
| 9 | Iris Sachet (FRA) | + 10" |
| 10 | Floortje Mackaij (NED) | + 10" |

== See also ==
- 2015 European Road Championships – Women's under-23 time trial
