= Ruby Livingstone =

New Zealand cyclist

Personal information
- Born: 12 March 1993 (age 33)

Cycling career
- Sport: Cycling
- Role: Rider

Ruby Livingstone (born 12 March 1993) is a former New Zealand professional racing cyclist. She raced for Bepink Laclassica.

== See also ==
- List of 2015 UCI Women's Teams and riders
