= Glory Odiase =

Nigerian cyclist

Personal information
- Born: September 15, 1993 (age 33) Rivers State, Nigeria

Cycling career
- Sport: Cycling
- Disciplines: Road and Track
- Role: Rider
- Rider type: All rounder
Medal record
Women's cycling
Representing Nigeria
All-Africa Games
Gold medal – first place	2015 Congo Brazzaville	Time trial

Glory Odiase (born 15 September 1993) is a Nigerian professional cyclist. She won a gold medal while representing Nigeria in the women's time trial cycling event alongside Happiness Okafor, Rosemary Marcus, and Gripa Tombrapa at the 2015 All-Africa Games in Congo Brazzaville.
