= Faina Potapova =

Kazakhstani cyclist

Personal information
- Full name: Faina Potapova
- Born: 12 September 1996 (age 30)

Cycling career
- Sport: Cycling
- Disciplines: Road; Track
- Role: Rider

Amateur teams
- 2018: UCI WCC Women's Team
- 2021: InEx Siberian Team

Professional teams
- 2014: Astana BePink Women Team
- 2015–2016: Astana–Acca Due O
- 2019: Astana
Medal record
Women's track cycling
Representing Kazakhstan
Asian Championships
Silver medal – second place	2022 New Delhi	Team pursuit

Faina Potapova (born 12 September 1996) is a Kazakhstani racing cyclist, who last rode for Russian amateur team InEx Siberian Team.

== Major results ==
2014
2nd Scratch, Track Clubs ACC Cup
2015
3rd Road race, National Road Championships
2016
2nd Team pursuit, Track Clubs ACC Cup (with Nadezhda Geneleva, Tatyana Geneleva and Yekaterina Yuraitis)
3rd Road race, National Road Championships
2017
2nd Road race, National Road Championships
2018
2nd Time trial, National Road Championships
2019
2nd Team time trial, Asian Road Championships
2021
2nd Road race, National Road Championships
2022
2nd Team time trial, Asian Road Championships
2nd Team pursuit, Asian Track Championships

== See also ==
- List of 2016 UCI Women's Teams and riders
