= Anouska Koster =

Dutch cyclist (born 1993)

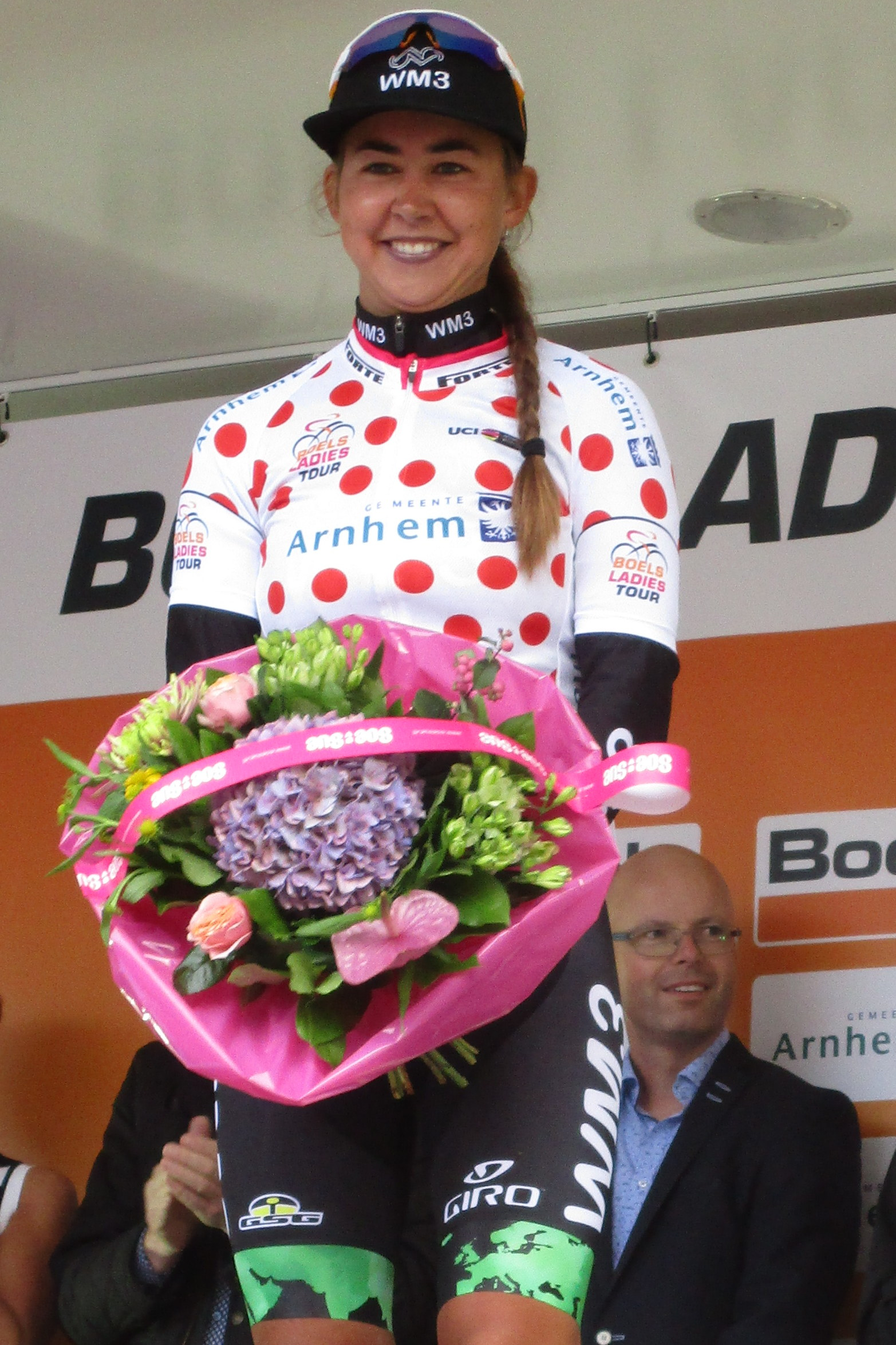
- Koster in the 2017 Holland Ladies Tour

Personal information
- Full name: Anouska Helena Koster
- Born: 20 August 1993 (age 33) Zwaagwesteinde, Netherlands
- Height: 1.65 m (5 ft 5 in)
- Weight: 56 kg (123 lb)

Cycling career
- Sport: Cycling
- Current team: Uno-X Mobility
- Discipline: Road
- Role: Rider

Professional teams
- 2012: Dolmans–Boels
- 2013–2014: Team Futurumshop.nl–Polaris
- 2015–2018: Rabobank-Liv Woman Cycling Team
- 2019: Team Virtu Cycling
- 2020: Parkhotel Valkenburg
- 2021–2022: Team Jumbo–Visma
- 2023–: Uno-X Pro Cycling Team

Anouska Helena Koster (born 20 August 1993) is a Dutch professional racing cyclist, who currently rides for UCI Women's WorldTeam Uno-X Mobility.

== Major results ==
2011
3rd Time trial, National Junior Road Championships
2014
5th Road race, UEC European Under-23 Road Championships
6th Overall Gracia-Orlová
6th Gent–Wevelgem
2015
1st Grand Prix Gippingen
1st Young rider classification Energiewacht Tour
3rd Ronde van Overijssel
4th Road race, UEC European Under-23 Road Championships
6th Gooik–Geraardsbergen–Gooik
2016
1st Road race, National Road Championships
3rd Overall Ladies Tour of Norway

1st Points classification
1st Stage 3

3rd Crescent Vårgårda Women World Cup TTT
3rd Drentse Acht van Westerveld
7th Prudential RideLondon Grand Prix
8th Overall Ladies Tour of Qatar

1st Young rider classification

9th Omloop van de IJsseldelta
2017
1st Overall Belgium Tour

1st Young rider classification
1st Stage 3

2nd Road race, National Road Championships
2nd Overall Gracia–Orlová

1st Points classification
1st Stage 2

7th Trofee Maarten Wynants
10th Cadel Evans Great Ocean Road Race
2018
5th Overall Belgium Tour
6th Overall Women's Herald Sun Tour
2019
1st Stage 4 Tour Cycliste Féminin International de l'Ardèche
7th Erondegemse Pijl
9th MerXem Classic
10th Overall Healthy Ageing Tour
2020
3rd Road race, National Road Championships
2021
1st Mountains classification Holland Ladies Tour
3rd Overall Kreiz Breizh Elites Dames

1st Points classification

6th Overall Festival Elsy Jacobs
6th Overall Trophée des Grimpeuses
2022
3rd Time trial, National Road Championships
7th Overall Tour of Scandinavia
2023
Tour de France

Held after Stage 4
Combativity award Stage 2

3rd Overall Festival Elsy Jacobs
4th Time trial, National Road Championships
6th Omloop Het Nieuwsblad
8th Vuelta a la Comunitat Valenciana Feminas
2024
1st Kreiz Breizh Elites
3rd Festival Elsy Jacobs Luxembourg
3rd Grand Prix de Wallonie
7th Festival Elsy Jacobs Garnich
2025
10th Clásica de Almería
