= Gracie Elvin =

Australian cyclist

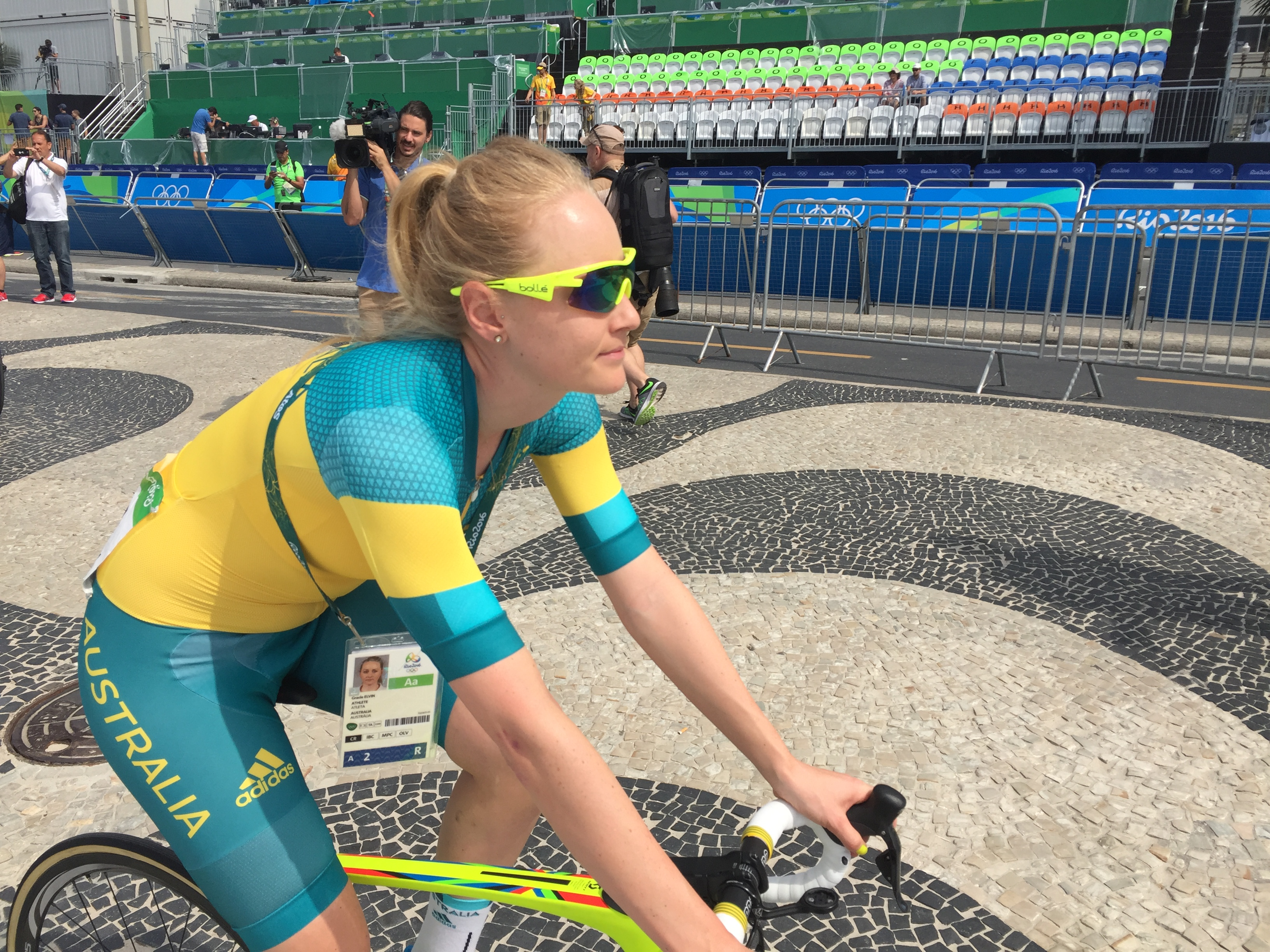
- Elvin at the 2016 Rio Olympics Road Race

Personal information
- Full name: Gracie Elvin
- Nickname: G
- Born: 31 October 1988 (age 37) Canberra, Australia

Cycling career
- Sport: Cycling
- Current team: Retired
- Disciplines: Road; Mountain bike racing
- Role: Rider
- Rider type: All-rounder; Cross-country cycling

Amateur teams
- 2009: Discovertasmania.com
- 2012: Jayco–AIS

Professional teams
- 2012: Faren–Honda Team
- 2013–2020: Orica–AIS

Gracie Elvin (born 31 October 1988) is an Australian former racing cyclist, who rode professionally between 2012 and 2020, for the Faren–Honda Team and Mitchelton–Scott. Elvin is a two-time winner of the Australian National Road Race Championships, with victories in 2013 and 2014, and the first Australian rider to record a podium finish at the Tour of Flanders for Women, with second in 2017.

== Career ==
She competed in the 2013 UCI women's road race in Florence. After missing the 2014 UCI Road World Championships, Elvin competed in the women's road race in 2015, 2016 and 2017. Elvin has also represented Australia at the 2014 Commonwealth Games in Glasgow, and the 2018 Commonwealth Games on home soil in the Gold Coast; she also competed in the road race at the 2016 Summer Olympics for Australia.

In October 2020, Elvin announced that she would retire at the end of the 2020 season.

Elvin is also the Communications Director of The Cyclists' Alliance.

Gracie Elvin, and Matthew Keenan co-hosted the Seven Network broadcast of the 2023 Santos Women's Tour Down Under used by Peacock in the US.

== Major results ==
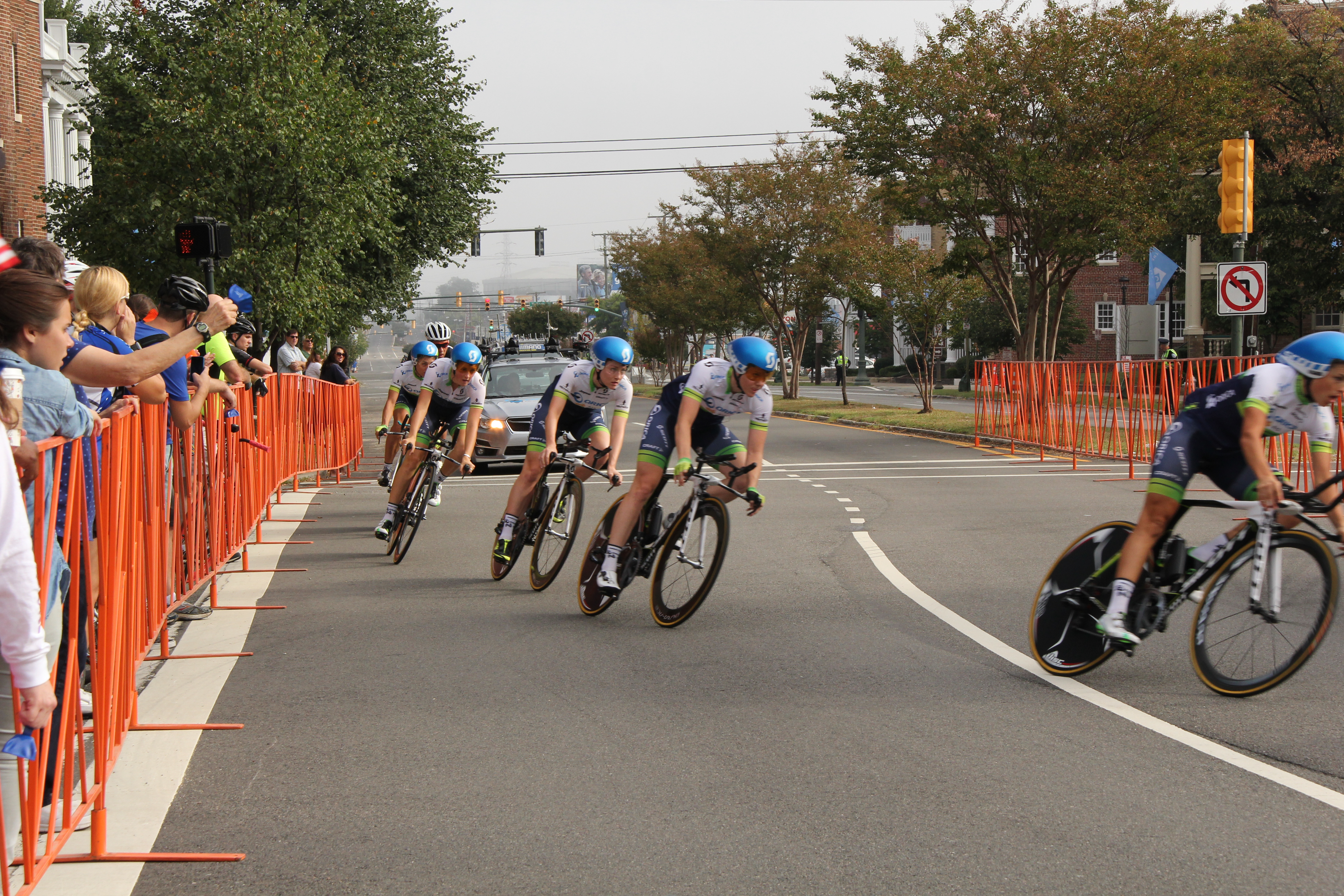
Elvin riding with Orica-AIS at the 2015 UCI Road World Championships

2006
2nd Cross-country, National Junior Mountain Bike Championships
2007
3rd Cross-country, National Under-23 Mountain Bike Championships
2008
2nd Cross-country, National Under-23 Mountain Bike Championships
2009
1st Cross-country, National Under-23 Mountain Bike Championships
2012
Oceania Road Cycling Championships

1st Road race
2nd Time trial

2nd EPZ Omloop van Borsele
6th Gooik–Geraardsbergen–Gooik
8th 7-Dorpenomloop Aalburg
2013
National Road Championships

1st Road race
3rd Criterium

4th Overall Ladies Tour of Qatar
6th Overall Energiewacht Tour
2014
1st Road race, National Road Championships
6th Road race, Commonwealth Games
7th EPZ Omloop van Borsele
9th Overall Energiewacht Tour
2015
1st Gooik–Geraardsbergen–Gooik
1st Stage 3b Thüringen Rundfahrt der Frauen
5th Overall Bay Classic Series

1st Stage 2

6th Cadel Evans Great Ocean Road Race
10th Overall Ladies Tour of Qatar
2016
1st Gooik–Geraardsbergen–Gooik
2nd Ronde van Drenthe
5th Overall Ladies Tour of Qatar
7th Overall Energiewacht Tour
7th Acht van Westerveld
9th Overall The Women's Tour
2017
2nd Dwars door Vlaanderen
2nd Tour of Flanders for Women
8th Drentse Acht van Westerveld
9th Gooik–Geraardsbergen–Gooik
10th Cadel Evans Great Ocean Road Race
10th Omloop Het Nieuwsblad
2018
2nd Cadel Evans Great Ocean Road Race
2nd Gooik–Geraardsbergen–Gooik
2nd Team time trial, Ladies Tour of Norway
2019
2nd Time trial, National Road Championships
4th La Classique Morbihan
5th Omloop van het Hageland
5th Drentse Acht van Westerveld
2020
3rd Criterium, National Road Championships

== See also ==
- 2014 Orica-AIS season
