= Yekaterina Yuraitis =

Kazakhstani cyclist

Personal information
- Born: 8 August 1996 (age 30)

Cycling career
- Sport: Cycling
- Discipline: Road
- Role: Rider

Professional teams
- 2014: Astana BePink Women Team
- 2015–2016: Astana–Acca Due O

Yekaterina Yuraitis (born 8 August 1996) is a Kazakhstani racing cyclist, who most recently rode for UCI Women's Team Astana.

== Major results ==
2013
Asian Junior Cycling Championships

2nd Time trial
8th Road race

2014
Asian Junior Cycling Championships

1st Time trial
8th Road race

Track Clubs ACC Cup

1st Individual pursuit
1st Points race

2015
1st Time trial, National Road Championships
2016
1st Time trial, National Road Championships
Track Clubs ACC Cup

1st Individual pursuit
2nd Team pursuit (with Nadezhda Geneleva, Faina Potapova and Tatyana Geneleva)

Track Asia Cup

2nd Individual pursuit
2nd Team pursuit (with Nadezhda Geneleva, Zhanerke Sanakbayeva and Rinata Akhmetcha)

2017
1st Time trial, Asian Under-23 Road Championships
2nd Time trial, National Road Championships

== See also ==
- List of 2016 UCI Women's Teams and riders
