= Arianna Fidanza =

Italian cyclist (born 1995)

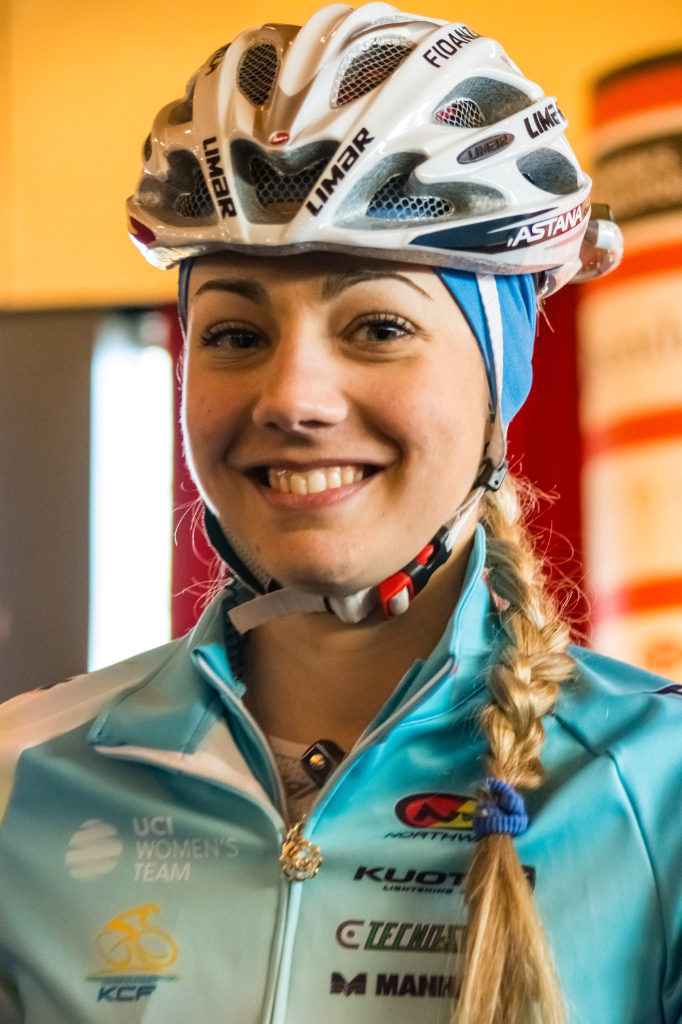
- Fidanza at the start of the 2016 Ronde van Drenthe

Personal information
- Full name: Arianna Fidanza
- Born: 6 January 1995 (age 31) Bergamo, Lombardy, Italy

Cycling career
- Sport: Cycling
- Current team: Laboral Kutxa–Fundación Euskadi
- Disciplines: Road; Track
- Role: Rider

Professional teams
- 2014: Estado de México–Faren Kuota
- 2015: Alé–Cipollini
- 2016–2017: Astana
- 2018–2019: Eurotarget–Bianchi–Vitasana
- 2020: Lotto–Soudal Ladies
- 2021–2022: Team BikeExchange
- 2023–2024: Ceratizit–WNT Pro Cycling
- 2025–: Laboral Kutxa–Fundación Euskadi

Arianna Fidanza (born 6 January 1995) is an Italian professional racing cyclist, who currently rides for UCI Women's ProTeam Laboral Kutxa–Fundación Euskadi. Arianna Fidanza is the daughter of former racing cyclist Giovanni Fidanza, and the sister of Martina Fidanza.

== Major results ==
2012
UEC European Junior Track Championships

1st Points race
3rd Team pursuit

2013
1st Points race, UCI Juniors Track World Championships
1st Team pursuit, UEC European Junior Track Championships
National Junior Road Championships

1st Time trial
2nd Road race

2014
3rd Points race, International Track Women & Men (Under-23)
2015
5th SwissEver GP Cham-Hagendorn
9th La Madrid Challenge by La Vuelta
2016
1st Stage 1 Tour of Zhoushan Island
3rd Gran Premio della Liberazione
3rd Points race, 6 giorni delle rose – Fiorenzuola
4th Gran Premio Bruno Beghelli Internazionale Donne Elite
2017
3rd SwissEver GP Cham-Hagendorn
2018
2nd SwissEver GP Cham-Hagendorn
6th Gran Premio Bruno Beghelli Internazionale Donne Elite
2019
1st Tour of Taiyuan International Women's Road Cycling Race
2nd Tour of Zhoushan Island I
5th Overall Tour of Zhoushan Island II
6th La Périgord Ladies
10th Gran Premio Bruno Beghelli Internazionale Donne Elite
2020
4th Vuelta a la Comunitat Valenciana Feminas
6th GP de Plouay
8th Omloop van het Hageland
2021
4th Dwars door de Westhoek
2022
5th GP Oetingen
5th Time trial, National Road Championships
6th Road race, Mediterranean Games
2023
1st Women Cycling Pro Costa De Almería
4th Omloop van het Hageland
4th Ronde de Mouscron
5th Overall Festival Elsy Jacobs
6th Trofeo Oro in Euro
7th Vuelta a la Comunitat Valenciana Feminas
2024
4th Clásica de Almería
4th Tour de Gatineau
5th Vuelta a la Comunitat Valenciana Feminas
7th Women Cycling Pro Costa De Almería
10th Festival Elsy Jacobs Garnich
2025
6th Clásica de Almería
9th Vuelta CV Feminas
10th Trofeo Palma Femina
