= Ilaria Sanguineti =

Italian cyclist

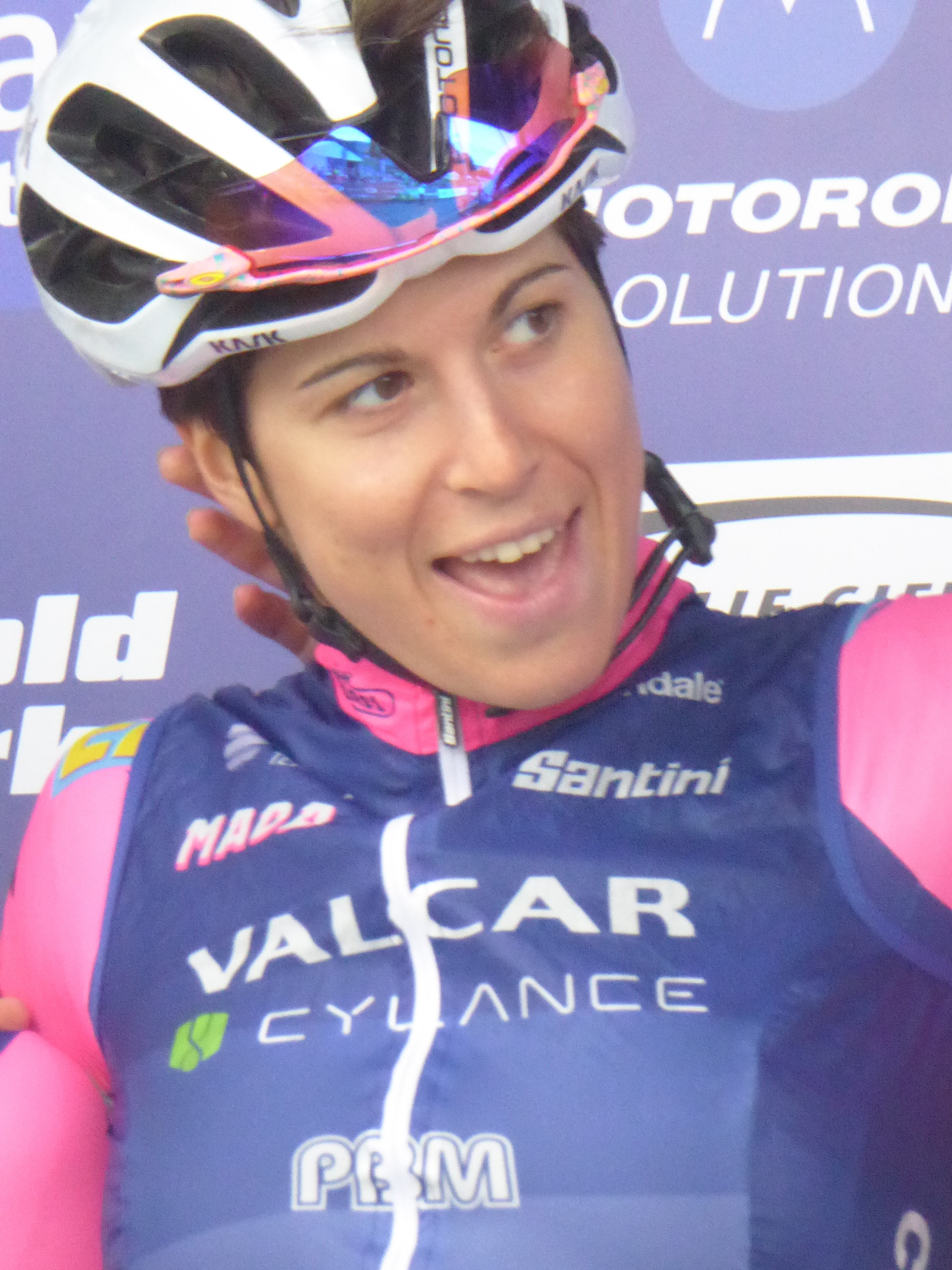
- Sanguineti at the 2019 Women's Tour of Scotland

Personal information
- Full name: Ilaria Sanguineti
- Born: 15 April 1994 (age 32) Sanremo, Italy

Cycling career
- Sport: Cycling
- Current team: Lidl–Trek
- Discipline: Road
- Role: Rider
- Rider type: Sprinter; Domestique

Professional teams
- 2013: Be Pink
- 2015–2017: BePink–La Classica
- 2018–2022: Valcar–PBM
- 2023–: Trek–Segafredo

Ilaria Sanguineti (born 15 April 1994) is an Italian professional racing cyclist, who rides for UCI Women's WorldTeam Lidl–Trek. During her career, Sanguineti has taken four victories – three of which have come at the Tour de Bretagne Féminin, including the general classification in 2015.

== Major results ==
2012
2nd Time trial, National Junior Road Championships
2015
1st Overall Tour de Bretagne Féminin

1st Young rider classification
1st Stage 1

2nd Road race, UEC European Under-23 Road Championships
7th Overall Tour of Zhoushan Island
2016
1st Stage 4 Tour de Bretagne Féminin
7th Gran Premio della Liberazione
8th Grand Prix de Dottignies
2017
1st Stage 1 (TTT) Setmana Ciclista Valenciana
3rd Pajot Hills Classic
4th Grand Prix de Dottignies
5th Overall Tour of Zhoushan Island
10th Gran Premio della Liberazione
2018
1st Points classification, Madrid Challenge by La Vuelta
4th Diamond Tour
4th Erondegemse Pijl
8th Tour of Guangxi Women's Elite World Challenge
2019
3rd Road race, National Road Championships
4th Trofee Maarten Wynants
6th Gran Premio Bruno Beghelli Internazionale Donne Elite
8th Tour of Guangxi Women's Elite World Challenge
2020
9th Omloop van het Hageland
2021
3rd Road race, National Road Championships
8th Dwars door het Hageland
2022
1st Dwars door het Hageland
2nd Vuelta a la Comunitat Valenciana Feminas
4th Trofeo Oro in Euro–Women's Bike Race
4th GP Eco-Struct
4th Classic Lorient Agglomération
5th Road race, Mediterranean Games
9th Gran Premio della Liberazione
9th Veenendaal–Veenendaal Classic
2023
10th Classic Brugge–De Panne
2024
5th Flanders Diamond Tour
