= A.R. Monex Women's Pro Cycling Team =

Italian cycling team

Team information
- UCI code: ASA (2015–2020); MNX (2021–)
- Registered: Kazakhstan (2015–2017, 2019–2020); Italy (2018, 2021–)
- Founded: 2015
- Discipline: Road
- Status: UCI Women's Team (2015–2019); UCI Women's Continental Team (2020–present)
- Bicycles: Kuota

Key personnel
- General manager: Zulfia Zabirova; Maurizio Fabretto

Team name history
- 2015 2016–2020 2021–: Astana–Acca Due O Astana Women's Team; A.R. Monex Women's Pro Cycling Team

A.R. Monex Women's Pro Cycling Team is a professional women's cycling team registered in Italy, which first competed in elite road bicycle racing events such as the UCI Women's Road World Cup in 2015.

== Team history ==
On 28 November 2014, Marzhan Baitlevova, Yekaterina Yuraitis, Makhabbat Umutzhanova, Natalya Sokovnina, and Aliya Kargaliyena signed with the team. On 30 November, Natalya Saitfutdinova and Faina Potapova signed with the team. On 2 December, the team signed Jessenia Meneses and Íngrid Drexel. On 6 December, the team signed Aizhan Zhaparova, Larisa Pankova, and Kseniya Dobrynina. On 12 December, Marika Campagnaro joined the team. On 18 December, Milda Jankauskaitė, Olena Demidova, and Carolina Rodriguez joined the team. On 24 December, Hanna Solovey signed for the team.

In June 2015, Astana-Acca Due O fired Hanna Solovey citing "unprofessional behaviour". This was disputed, with the Ukrainian Cycling Federation, claiming she was fired for refusing to take up Kazakhstani citizenship ahead of the Rio 2016 Olympics.

For the 2021 season, the team merged with the A.R. Efideporte mountain bike team.

== Team roster ==
As of 10 March 2021.

| Rider | Date of birth |
|---|---|
| Gaia Benzi (ITA) | 20 December 1999 (age 26) |
| Maria Pia Chiatto (ITA) | 13 May 2002 (age 24) |
| Emma Faoro (ITA) | 21 March 2002 (age 24) |
| Ariadna Gutiérrez (MEX) | 22 August 1991 (age 35) |
| Julieta Lledias (MEX) | 16 April 2001 (age 25) |
| Eider Merino Cortazar (ESP) | 2 August 1994 (age 32) |
| Mariia Miliaeva (RUS) | 16 July 2001 (age 25) |
| Maria Novolodskaya (RUS) | 28 July 1999 (age 27) |

| Rider | Date of birth |
|---|---|
| Katia Ragusa (ITA) | 19 May 1997 (age 29) |
| Andrea Ramírez (MEX) | 25 September 1999 (age 26) |
| Lizbeth Salazar (MEX) | 8 December 1996 (age 29) |
| Arlenis Sierra (CUB) | 7 December 1992 (age 33) |
| Maria Vittoria Sperotto (ITA) | 20 November 1996 (age 29) |
| Jade Teolis (FRA) | 12 January 2002 (age 24) |
| María José Vargas (CRC) | 15 February 1996 (age 30) |

== Major wins ==
2015
Copa Cuba de Pista – Points race, Íngrid Drexel
2016
Stage 1 Tour of Zhoushan Island I, Arianna Fidanza
2017
Points classification Setmana Ciclista Valenciana, Arlenis Sierra

Stage 3, Arlenis Sierra

Mishmar Ha'Emeq Mountainbike (XCO), Tatyana Geneleva
Trofeo Alfredo Binda-Comune di Cittiglio, Arlenis Sierra
Rosh Ha'Ayin Mountainbike (XCO), Tatyana Geneleva
Orsago Chrono, Olena Pavlukhina
Points classification Tour of California, Arlenis Sierra

Youth classification, Arlenis Sierra

Overall Vuelta Internacional Femenina a Costa Rica, Arlenis Sierra

Points classification, Arlenis Sierra
Mountains classification, Arlenis Sierra
Teams classification
Prologue, Stages 1 & 3, Arlenis Sierra

2018
Overall Giro della Campania in Rosa, Elena Pirrone

Stage 2, Elena Pirrone
Stage 3, Martina Alzini

GP della Liberazione PINK, Letizia Paternoster
Overall Festival Elsy Jacobs, Letizia Paternoster

Points classification, Letizia Paternoster
Mountains classification, Sofia Bertizzolo
Youth classification, Letizia Paternoster
Stage 2, Letizia Paternoster

Road Race, Pan American Cycling Championships, Arlenis Sierra
Stage 3 Tour of California, Arlenis Sierra
Youth classification Giro Rosa, Sofia Bertizzolo
Mountains classification Giro Toscana Int. Femminile – Memorial Michela Fanini, Sofia Bertizzolo
Central American and Caribbean Sports Games

Time Trial, Arlenis Sierra
Team Pursuit, Arlenis Sierra
Madison, Arlenis Sierra

Stage 2 Tour Cycliste Féminin International de l'Ardèche, Arlenis Sierra
Overall Giro delle Marche, Sofia Bertizzolo
Mountains classification Vuelta a Colombia Femenina, Blanca Liliana Moreno
Overall Vuelta Internacional Femenina a Costa Rica, Blanca Liliana Moreno

Stage 2 (ITT), Blanca Liliana Moreno

2019
Cadel Evans Great Ocean Road Race, Arlenis Sierra
Mountains classification Tour of California, Blanca Liliana Moreno
Chabany Race, Olga Shekel
Overall Vuelta Femenina a Guatemala, Liliana Moreno

Stages 1, 2, 4 & 5, Arlenis Sierra
Stage 3, Carolina Rodriguez

Overall Giro Toscana Int. Femminile – Memorial Michela Fanini, Arlenis Sierra

Points classification, Arlenis Sierra
Prologue, Arlenis Sierra

2020
Stage 1 Women's Herald Sun Tour, Arlenis Sierra
2021
Clasica Femenina Navarra, Arlenis Sierra
Overall Giro della Toscana Int. Femminile – Memorial Michela Fanini, Arlenis Sierra

Points classification, Arlenis Sierra
Stages 1 & 2, Arlenis Sierra

Tre Valli Varesine Women's Race, Arlenis Sierra

== National champions ==
2015
Kazakhstan Road Race, Natalya Saifutdinova
Kazakhstan Time Trial, Yekaterina Yuraitis
Mexico Time Trial, Íngrid Drexel
2016
Kazakhstan Road Race, Natalya Saifutdinova
Kazakhstan Time Trial, Yekaterina Yuraitis
Russia Time Trial, Tatiana Antoshina
Kazakhstan Track (Scratch Race), Nadezhda Geneleva
Kazakhstan Track (Points Race), Makhabbat Umutzhanova
2017
Cuba Road Race, Arlenis Sierra
Cuba Time Trial, Arlenis Sierra
Kazakhstan Road Race, Tatyana Geneleva
Azerbaijan Road Race, Olena Pavlukhina
Azerbaijan Time Trial, Olena Pavlukhina
Kazakhstan Track (Points race), Zhanerke Sanakbayeva
Kazakhstan Track (Scratch race), Zhanerke Sanakbayeva
Kazakhstan Track (Individual pursuit), Amiliya Iskakova
2018
Pan American Road Race, Arlenis Sierra
Kazakhstan Road Race, Natalya Saifutdinova
Kazakhstan Time Trial, Natalya Saifutdinova
European Track (Elimination race), Letizia Paternoster
European U23 Track (Team pursuit), Martina Alzini
European U23 Track (Team pursuit), Letizia Paternoster
European U23 Track (Omnium), Letizia Paternoster
2019
Kazakhstan Time Trial, Makhabbat Umutzhanova
Kazakhstan Road Race, Svetlana Pachshenko
Cuba Road Race, Arlenis Sierra
Cuba Time Trial, Arlenis Sierra
2020
Ukraine Time Trial, Olga Shekel
Mexico Track (Elimination race), Lizbeth Salazar
Mexico Track (Omnium), Lizbeth Salazar
Mexico Track (Points race), Lizbeth Salazar
2021
Mexico Road Race, Lizbeth Salazar
Russia Track (Team Pursuit), Mariia Miliaeva
Russia Track (Team Pursuit), Maria Novolodskaya
Russia Track (Madison), Maria Novolodskaya
