= Gooik =

- Municipality
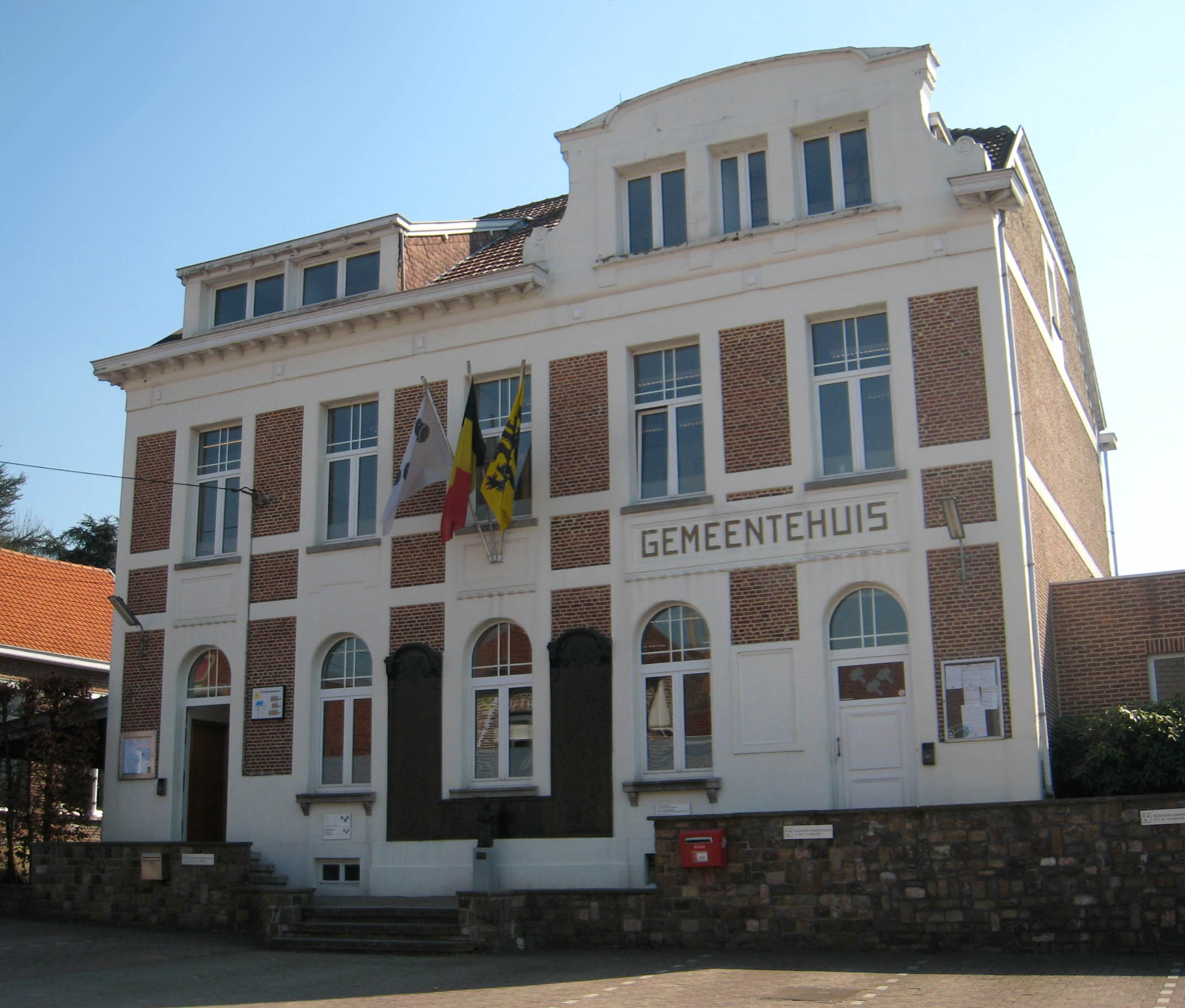
- Gooik town hall

- Flag Coat of arms

- Location of Gooik in Flemish Brabant
- Interactive map of Gooik
- Location in Belgium
- Coordinates: 50°48′N 04°07′E
- Country: Belgium
- Community: Flemish Community
- Region: Flemish Region
- Province: Flemish Brabant
- Arrondissement: Halle-Vilvoorde

Government
  - Mayor: Simon De Boeck (CD&V)
  - Governing party: CD&V

Population (2018-01-01)
  - Total: 9,236
- Postal codes: 1755
- NIS code: 23024
- Area codes: 054, 02
- Website: www.gooik.be

Gooik (Dutch pronunciation: [ɣoːik]) is a former municipality located in the Belgian province of Flemish Brabant. The municipality comprises the towns of Gooik proper, Kester, Leerbeek, Strijland and Oetingen. It is now part of the municipality of Pajottegem, following the 2025 fusion of the Belgian municipalities. On January 1, 2018 Gooik had a total population of 9,236. The total area is 39.70 km^{2} (15.33 sq mi), which gives a population density of 232 inhabitants per square kilometre (600/sq mi).

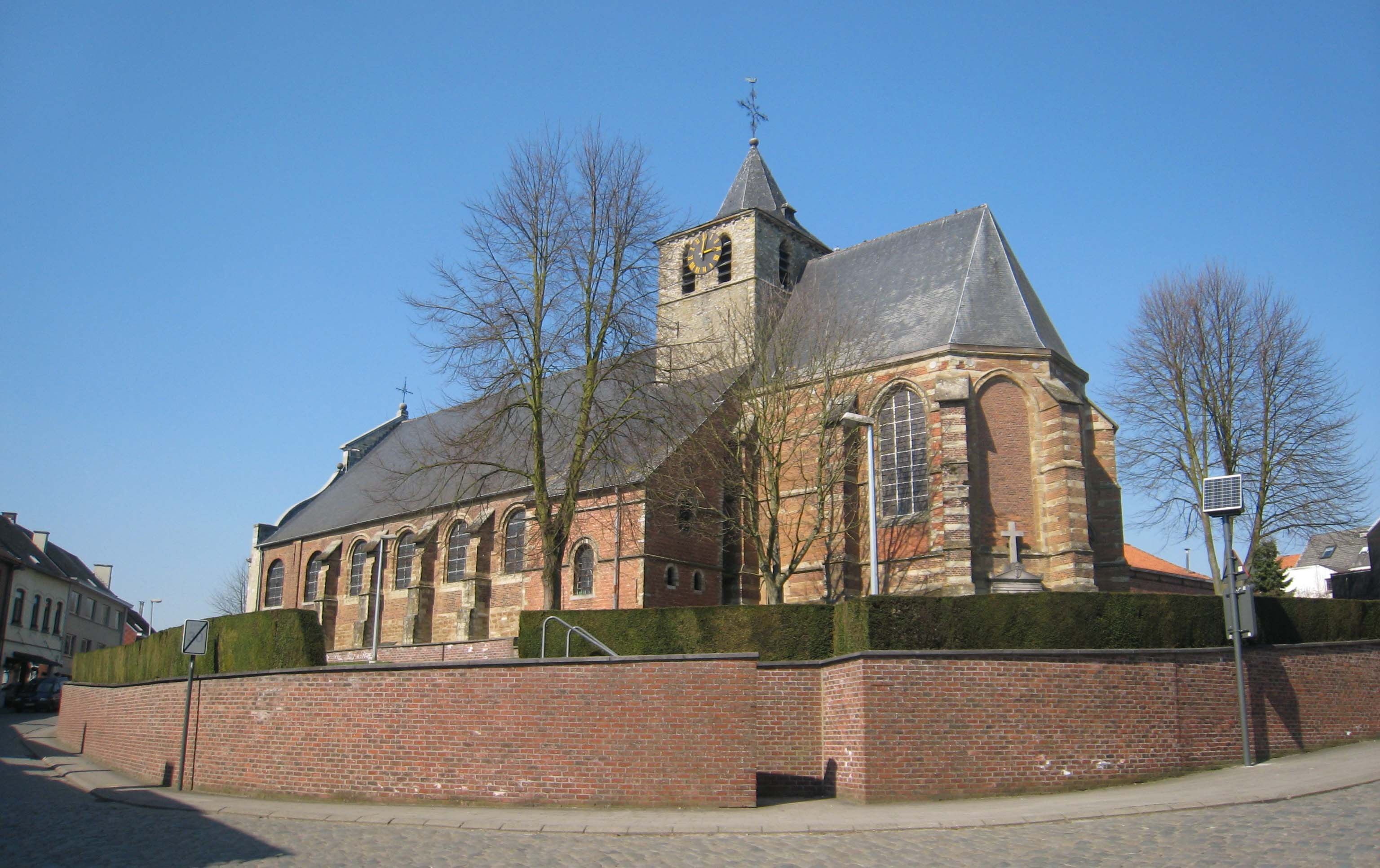
Church in the centre of Gooik
