= 2018 UCI Women's World Tour =

Women's cycling competition season

- Third edition of the UCI Women's World Tour

Details
- Dates: 3 March – 21 October 2018
- Location: Europe; USA; China
- Races: 24

Champions
- Individual champion: Annemiek van Vleuten (Netherlands) (Mitchelton–Scott)
- Teams' champion: Boels–Dolmans

The 2018 UCI Women's World Tour was a competition that included twenty-four road cycling events throughout the 2018 women's cycling season. It was the third edition of the ranking system launched by the Union Cycliste Internationale (UCI) in 2016. The competition began with Strade Bianche on 3 March and concluded with the Tour of Guangxi on 21 October. Anna van der Breggen of the Netherlands was the defending champion.

Van der Breggen, riding for the Boels–Dolmans team, was unable to defend her title, as she finished third in the standings behind compatriots Annemiek van Vleuten (Mitchelton–Scott) and Marianne Vos, who was riding for the WaowDeals Pro Cycling squad. Having taken three podium finishes, van Vleuten took the top spot after a strong second half of the season commencing at the women's Grand Tour, the Giro Rosa. Van Vleuten won three of the last four stages, taking the overall victory by over four minutes from her closest competitor, as well as winning the race's points classification. Two days later, at La Course by Le Tour de France, van Vleuten took victory on the finish line, surpassing van der Breggen, who had faded over the closing stages. Van Vleuten then took the World Tour jersey for the season, winning the overall at the Holland Ladies Tour, again with three stage victories, ultimately finishing on 1411.86 points.

Vos finished 16.98 points behind in second place, with a tally of 1394.88 points. After podium finishes at the Trofeo Alfredo Binda, and the Women's Tour, Vos took her first victory of the season with a stage win at the Giro Rosa, before a second-place finish in RideLondon's Classique race. In the August Scandinavian races, Vos won the Postnord UCI WWT Vårgårda WestSweden road race, before taking a clean sweep of the Ladies Tour of Norway, winning all three stages and the general classification, taking the World Tour lead in the process. Vos ended her road season after another second-place finish at the GP de Plouay – Lorient Agglomération, shifting her focus to the cyclo-cross season starting in the following month, losing the lead to van Vleuten in the process. Van der Breggen, with 1323.33 points, led the classification for most of the season, taking four victories by the end of the April, including the season-opening Strade Bianche, and two of the three Ardennes classics, with only the Amstel Gold Race – won by teammate Chantal Blaak – not going to van der Breggen. Van der Breggen skipped the Giro Rosa, and failed to win another individual race on the World Tour, with her only remaining success of the season coming during the Postnord UCI WWT Vårgårda WestSweden team time trial.

In the World Tour's other classifications, Astana rider Sofia Bertizzolo from Italy was the winner of the youth classification for riders under the age of 23. Bertizzolo took four victories in the classification, and finished with 42 points, 12 points ahead of the next closest rider, Liane Lippert of Team Sunweb, a three-time winner during 2018. Boels–Dolmans were the winners of the teams classification, with 4329.99 points, taking eight wins during the season, just as they did in 2017. Mitchelton–Scott finished in second place with 4119.02 points, primarily through the performances of van Vleuten and Amanda Spratt, who finished fourth overall in the individual classification, with five victories. Third place went to Team Sunweb on 3321.99 points, taking three victories during the season.

== Teams ==
For the 2018 season the following teams were not listed by the UCI at UCI Women's team level: Colavita/Bianchi, Giusfredi–Bianchi, Lensworld–Kuota, SAS–Macogep, Visit Dallas DNA Pro Cycling and Weber Shimano Ladies Power.

2018 UCI Women's World Teams
Code	Official Team Name	Country
ACT	Alasayl Cycling Team	United Arab Emirates
ALE	Alé–Cipollini	Italy
VAI	Aromitalia Vaiano	Italy
ASA	Astana	Italy
BPK	Bepink	Italy
BDM	Bizkaia Durango–Euskadi Murias	Spain
DLT	Boels–Dolmans	Netherlands
BTC	BTC City Ljubljana	Slovenia
LPR	Canyon//SRAM	Germany
CBT	Cervélo–Bigla Pro Cycling	Germany
GPC	China Chongming–Liv	Hong Kong
CGS	Cogeas–Mettler Pro Cycling Team	Russia
CZF	Conceria Zabri–Fanini	Albania
CPC	Cylance Pro Cycling	United States
DVE	Doltcini–Van Eyck Sport	Belgium
SBT	Eurotarget–Bianchi–Vitasana	Italy
EXP	Experza–Footlogix	Belgium
FDJ	FDJ Nouvelle-Aquitaine Futuroscope	France
HBS	Hagens Berman–Supermint	United States
HCT	Health Mate–Cyclelive Team	Belgium
HPU	Hitec Products–Birk Sport	Norway
LSL	Lotto–Soudal Ladies	Belgium
MCC	Minsk Cycling Club	Belarus
MTS	Mitchelton–Scott	Australia
MOV	Movistar Team	Spain
PHV	Parkhotel Valkenburg	Netherlands
RLW	Rally Cycling	United States
MIC	S.C. Michela Fanini Rox	Italy
SER	Servetto–Stradalli Cycle–Alurecycling	Italy
SWT	Sopela Women's Team	Spain
STR	Storey Racing	United Kingdom
SWA	Swapit–Agolíco	Mexico
TDP	Team Dukla Praha	Czech Republic
ILU	Team Illuminate	United States
SUN	Team Sunweb	Netherlands
TVC	Team Virtu Cycling	Denmark
TWC	Thailand Women's Cycling Team	Thailand
TIB	Tibco–Silicon Valley Bank	United States
TOG	Top Girls Fassa Bortolo	Italy
DRP	Trek–Drops	Great Britain
T20	Twenty20 p/b Sho-Air	United States
UHC	UnitedHealthcare	United States
VAL	Valcar–PBM	Italy
WHT	Wiggle High5	Great Britain
WAD	WaowDeals Pro Cycling	Netherlands
WNT	WNT–Rotor Pro Cycling	Great Britain

== Events ==
For the 2018 season, the calendar consisted of 24 races, up from 20 in 2017. All 2017 races returned for the 2018 calendar, with the additions of the Three Days of Bruges–De Panne, the Emakumeen Euskal Bira and the Tour of Guangxi to the calendar. The Ladies Tour of Norway also added a stand-alone team time trial that awarded full points to the rankings, held the day before the main stage race.

2018 UCI Women's World Tour
Race	Date	First	Second	Third	Leader
(Italy) Strade Bianche	3 March	Anna van der Breggen (NED); Boels–Dolmans	Katarzyna Niewiadoma (POL); Canyon//SRAM	Elisa Longo Borghini (ITA); Wiggle High5	Anna van der Breggen (NED); Boels–Dolmans
(Netherlands) Ronde van Drenthe	11 March	Amy Pieters (NED); Boels–Dolmans	Alexis Ryan (USA); Canyon//SRAM	Chloe Hosking (AUS); Alé–Cipollini	Anna van der Breggen (NED); Boels–Dolmans
(Italy) Trofeo Alfredo Binda-Comune di Cittiglio	18 March	Katarzyna Niewiadoma (POL); Canyon//SRAM	Chantal Blaak (NED); Boels–Dolmans	Marianne Vos (NED); WaowDeals Pro Cycling	Katarzyna Niewiadoma (POL); Canyon//SRAM
(Belgium) Three Days of De Panne	22 March	Jolien D'Hoore (BEL); Mitchelton–Scott	Chloe Hosking (AUS); Alé–Cipollini	Christine Majerus (LUX); Boels–Dolmans	Katarzyna Niewiadoma (POL); Canyon//SRAM
(Belgium) Gent–Wevelgem	25 March	Marta Bastianelli (ITA); Alé–Cipollini	Jolien D'Hoore (BEL); Mitchelton–Scott	Lisa Klein (GER); Canyon//SRAM	Jolien D'Hoore (BEL); Mitchelton–Scott
(Belgium) Tour of Flanders	1 April	Anna van der Breggen (NED); Boels–Dolmans	Amy Pieters (NED); Boels–Dolmans	Annemiek van Vleuten (NED); Mitchelton–Scott	Amy Pieters (NED); Boels–Dolmans
(Netherlands) Amstel Gold Race	15 April	Chantal Blaak (NED); Boels–Dolmans	Lucinda Brand (NED); Team Sunweb	Amanda Spratt (AUS); Mitchelton–Scott	Chantal Blaak (NED); Boels–Dolmans
(Belgium) La Flèche Wallonne	18 April	Anna van der Breggen (NED); Boels–Dolmans	Ashleigh Moolman (RSA); Cervélo–Bigla Pro Cycling	Megan Guarnier (USA); Boels–Dolmans	Anna van der Breggen (NED); Boels–Dolmans
(Belgium) Liège–Bastogne–Liège	22 April	Anna van der Breggen (NED); Boels–Dolmans	Amanda Spratt (AUS); Mitchelton–Scott	Annemiek van Vleuten (NED); Mitchelton–Scott	Anna van der Breggen (NED); Boels–Dolmans
(China) Tour of Chongming Island	26–28 April	Charlotte Becker (GER); Hitec Products–Birk Sport	Shannon Malseed (AUS); Tibco–Silicon Valley Bank	Anastasiia Iakovenko (RUS); BTC City Ljubljana	Anna van der Breggen (NED); Boels–Dolmans
(United States) Tour of California	17–19 May	Katie Hall (USA); UnitedHealthcare	Tayler Wiles (USA); Trek–Drops	Katarzyna Niewiadoma (POL); Canyon//SRAM	Anna van der Breggen (NED); Boels–Dolmans
(Spain) Emakumeen Euskal Bira	19–22 May	Amanda Spratt (AUS); Mitchelton–Scott	Annemiek van Vleuten (NED); Mitchelton–Scott	Anna van der Breggen (NED); Boels–Dolmans	Anna van der Breggen (NED); Boels–Dolmans
(United Kingdom) The Women's Tour	13–17 June	Coryn Rivera (USA); Team Sunweb	Marianne Vos (NED); WaowDeals Pro Cycling	Dani Rowe (GBR); WaowDeals Pro Cycling	Anna van der Breggen (NED); Boels–Dolmans
(Italy) Giro Rosa	6–15 July	Annemiek van Vleuten (NED); Mitchelton–Scott	Ashleigh Moolman (RSA); Cervélo–Bigla Pro Cycling	Amanda Spratt (AUS); Mitchelton–Scott	Anna van der Breggen (NED); Boels–Dolmans
La Course by Le Tour de France	17 July	Annemiek van Vleuten (NED); Mitchelton–Scott	Anna van der Breggen (NED); Boels–Dolmans	Ashleigh Moolman (RSA); Cervélo–Bigla Pro Cycling	Anna van der Breggen (NED); Boels–Dolmans
(United Kingdom) Prudential RideLondon Classique	28 July	Kirsten Wild (NED); Wiggle High5	Marianne Vos (NED); WaowDeals Pro Cycling	Elisa Balsamo (ITA); Valcar–PBM	Anna van der Breggen (NED); Boels–Dolmans
Postnord UCI WWT Vårgårda WestSweden TTT	11 August	Boels–Dolmans	Team Sunweb	Cervélo–Bigla Pro Cycling	Anna van der Breggen (NED); Boels–Dolmans
Postnord UCI WWT Vårgårda WestSweden RR	13 August	Marianne Vos (NED); WaowDeals Pro Cycling	Kirsten Wild (NED); Wiggle High5	Lotta Lepistö (FIN); Cervélo–Bigla Pro Cycling	Anna van der Breggen (NED); Boels–Dolmans
Ladies Tour of Norway – TTT	16 August	Team Sunweb	Mitchelton–Scott	Cervélo–Bigla Pro Cycling	Anna van der Breggen (NED); Boels–Dolmans
Ladies Tour of Norway	17–19 August	Marianne Vos (NED); WaowDeals Pro Cycling	Emilia Fahlin (SWE); Wiggle High5	Coryn Rivera (USA); Team Sunweb	Marianne Vos (NED); WaowDeals Pro Cycling
(France) GP de Plouay – Lorient Agglomération	25 August	Amy Pieters (NED); Boels–Dolmans	Marianne Vos (NED); WaowDeals Pro Cycling	Coryn Rivera (USA); Team Sunweb	Marianne Vos (NED); WaowDeals Pro Cycling
(Netherlands) Holland Ladies Tour	28 August – 2 September	Annemiek van Vleuten (NED); Mitchelton–Scott	Ellen van Dijk (NED); Team Sunweb	Anna van der Breggen (NED); Boels–Dolmans	Annemiek van Vleuten (NED); Mitchelton–Scott
(Spain) La Madrid Challenge by La Vuelta	15–16 September	Ellen van Dijk (NED); Team Sunweb	Coryn Rivera (USA); Team Sunweb	Audrey Cordon-Ragot (FRA); Wiggle High5	Annemiek van Vleuten (NED); Mitchelton–Scott
(China) Tour of Guangxi Women's WorldTour race	21 October	Arlenis Sierra (CUB); Astana	Hannah Barnes (GBR); Canyon//SRAM	Sara Mustonen (SWE); Experza–Footlogix	Annemiek van Vleuten (NED); Mitchelton–Scott

== Points standings ==
For the 2018 season, a new point-scoring system was introduced by the Union Cycliste Internationale (UCI), rewarding the top 40 riders rather than the top 20 as in 2017. Further changes were made to the teams classification, where all point-scoring riders were counted in the rankings.

=== Individual ===
Riders tied with the same number of points were classified by number of victories, then number of second places, third places, and so on, in World Tour events and stages.

Individual rankings
Rank	Name	Team(s)	Points
1	Annemiek van Vleuten (NED)	Mitchelton–Scott	1411.86
2	Marianne Vos (NED)	WaowDeals Pro Cycling	1394.88
3	Anna van der Breggen (NED)	Boels–Dolmans	1323.33
4	Amanda Spratt (AUS)	Mitchelton–Scott	1218.86
5	Coryn Rivera (USA)	Team Sunweb	1040.50
6	Ashleigh Moolman (RSA)	Cervélo–Bigla Pro Cycling	1012.95
7	Amy Pieters (NED)	Boels–Dolmans	922.90
8	Katarzyna Niewiadoma (POL)	Canyon//SRAM	887.67
9	Jolien D'Hoore (BEL)	Mitchelton–Scott	688.86
10	Ellen van Dijk (NED)	Team Sunweb	687.74
11	Elisa Longo Borghini (ITA)	Wiggle High5	652.76
12	Chantal Blaak (NED)	Boels–Dolmans	613.90
13	Kirsten Wild (NED)	Wiggle High5	571.93
14	Megan Guarnier (USA)	Boels–Dolmans; United States (national team)	564.24
15	Lucinda Brand (NED)	Team Sunweb	558.07
16	Christine Majerus (LUX)	Boels–Dolmans	526.57
17	Chloe Hosking (AUS)	Alé–Cipollini	504.33
18	Marta Bastianelli (ITA)	Alé–Cipollini	473
19	Arlenis Sierra (CUB)	Astana	460
20	Giorgia Bronzini (ITA)	Cylance Pro Cycling	447
287 riders scored points

=== Youth ===
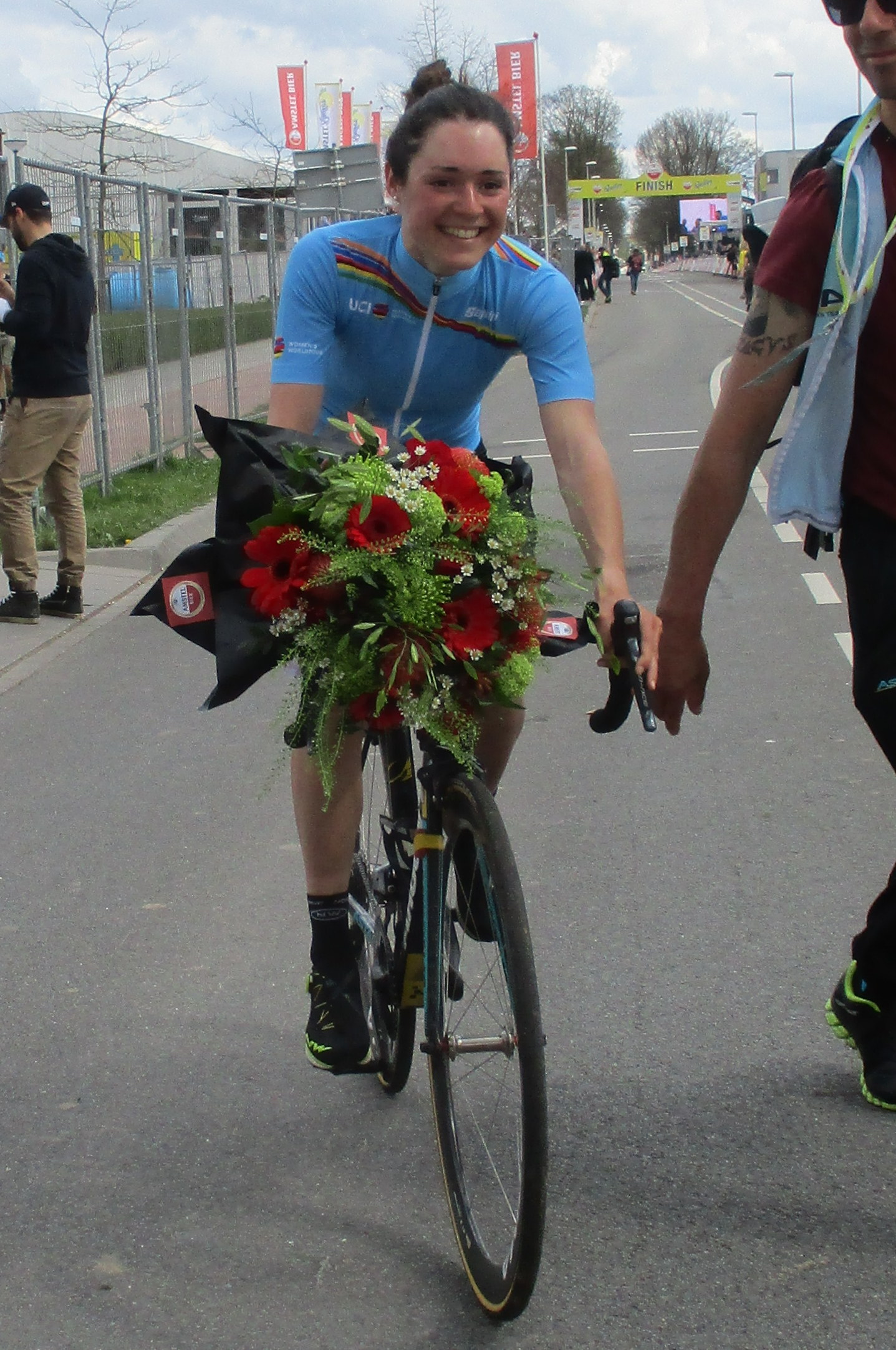
Sofia Bertizzolo (pictured at the Amstel Gold Race), the winner of the youth classification.

The top three riders in the final results of each World Tour event's young rider classification received points towards the standings. Six points were awarded to first place, four points to second place and two points to third place.

Youth rankings
Rank	Name	Team	Points
1	Sofia Bertizzolo (ITA)	Astana	42
2	Liane Lippert (GER)	Team Sunweb	30
3	Jeanne Korevaar (NED)	WaowDeals Pro Cycling	22
4	Elisa Balsamo (ITA)	Valcar–PBM	18
5	Amalie Dideriksen (DEN)	Boels–Dolmans	14
6	Letizia Paternoster (ITA)	Astana	10
7	Lisa Klein (GER)	Canyon//SRAM	10
8	Maria Novolodskaya (RUS)	Cogeas–Mettler Pro Cycling Team	10
9	Karalina Savenka (BLR)	Minsk Cycling Club	6
10	Chiara Consonni (ITA)	Valcar–PBM	6
11	Nikola Nosková (CZE)	Bepink	6
12	Aafke Soet (NED)	WNT–Rotor Pro Cycling	6
13	Sara Poidevin (CAN)	Rally Cycling	6
14	Silvia Persico (ITA)	Valcar–PBM	6
15	Susanne Andersen (NOR)	Hitec Products–Birk Sport	6
16	Lorena Wiebes (NED)	Parkhotel Valkenburg	6
17	Angelica Brogi (ITA)	Aromitalia Vaiano	6
18	Juliette Labous (FRA)	Team Sunweb	6
19	Abby-Mae Parkinson (GBR)	Trek–Drops	6
20	Elena Pirrone (ITA)	Astana	4
33 riders scored points

=== Team ===
Team rankings were calculated by adding the ranking points of all the riders of a team in the table.

Rank	Team	Points	Scoring riders
1	Boels–Dolmans	4329.99	10 riders Van der Breggen (1323.33), Pieters (922.90), Blaak (613.90), Guarnier (564.24), (Note: Guarnier's tally includes 5 points earned at the Tour of California, where Boels–Dolmans were not competing.) Majerus (526.57), Dideriksen (195), Canuel (129.57), Sk. Schneider (30.24), (Note: Schneider's tally includes 16 points earned at the Tour of California, where Boels–Dolmans were not competing.) Plichta (14.24), Van den Bos (10)
2	Mitchelton–Scott	4119.02	10 riders Van Vleuten (1411.86), Spratt (1218.86), D'Hoore (688.86), G. Williams (231), Roy (199.86), Kennedy (142.86), Elvin (123.86), Allen (50.86), Manly (48), Crooks (3)
3	Team Sunweb	3321.99	10 riders Rivera (1040.50), Van Dijk (687.74), Brand (558.07), Kirchmann (358.07), Mackaij (266.33), Lippert (174.07), Winder (111.90), Labous (89.57), Mathiesen (29.17), Soek (6.57)
4	Canyon//SRAM	2545.02	10 riders Niewiadoma (887.67), Cecchini (341.67), A. Ryan (332.67), H. Barnes (228), Klein (203.67), Ferrand-Prévot (193), Amialiusik (160), A. Barnes (83.67), Cromwell (67), Worrack (47.67)
5	Wiggle High5	2384.01 (Note: Listed by UCI on 2376.01 points, missing Grace Brown's points from the Tour of California and the La Course by Le Tour de France.)	15 riders Longo Borghini (652.76), Wild (571.93), Fahlin (347.93), Cordon-Ragot (331.93), Brennauer (318.50), Edmondson (74.50), Yonamine (15.43), Leth (15), Archibald (14.17), G. Garner (10), Ritter (9.43), Brown (8), (Note: Points not listed with any team.) Stewart (8), Barbieri (5), Cure (1.43)
6	WaowDeals Pro Cycling	2380.99	Vos (1394.88), Stultiens (264.71), Rowe (233.88), R. Markus (168.88), Korevaar (130.88), A. Koster (95.88), Rooijakkers (83.88), Kastelijn (8)
7	Cervélo–Bigla Pro Cycling	1986.99	Moolman (1012.95), Lepistö (373.95), Uttrup Ludwig (364.95), Koppenburg (117.95), Duyck (57.95), Norsgaard Jørgensen (56.95), Hanselmann (2.29)
8	Alé–Cipollini	1471.98	10 riders Hosking (504.33), Bastianelli (473), Santesteban (194), Ensing (150), S. Paladin (85.33), Knetemann (31.33), Trevisi (15.33), Swinkels (11.33), Ragažinskienė (4.33), Kasper (3)
9	Astana	922	Sierra (460), Bertizzolo (184.25), C. Rodríguez (82), Paternoster (76.25), Pirrone (46.25), Vieceli (33.25), Moreno (30), Beggin (10)
10	Valcar–PBM	912.02	Confalonieri (277.67), Balsamo (208), Muccioli (122.67), Sanguineti (107.67), Consonni (63.67), Persico (59.67), A. Paladin (36.67), Cavalli (29), Vigilia (7)
11	BTC City Ljubljana	811	Bujak (362.20), Iakovenko (269.20), Batagelj (91.20), Boogaard (25.20), Nilsson (25), Pintar (18), Lechner (15.20), Žigart (5)
12	Movistar Team	803	10 riders Jasińska (279.81), Biannic (171.81), García (159.14), Merino (82.14), González (41.67), Neylan (27.14), Oyarbide (24.67), Llamas (12.14), G. Rodríguez (2.81), Teruel (1.67)
13	Cylance Pro Cycling	638 (Note: Listed by UCI on 191 points, missing Giorgia Bronzini's points from the 2018 season.)	Bronzini (447), Gutiérrez (87), Ratto (65), Shapira (11), Tagliaferro (10), Stephens (8), Doebel-Hickok (5), Erić (5)
14	Tibco–Silicon Valley Bank	627.02	11 riders Jackson (189.17), Malseed (184.17), Chapman (136.17), K. Ryan (49), Drexel (29.17), Cobb (13), Bruderer (9.17), Newsom (5), Albrecht (5), Scandolara (4.17), Buss (3)
15	Trek–Drops	590.99	Wiles (334.57), (Note: Wiles' tally includes 114 points earned at the Holland Ladies Tour, where Trek–Drops were not competing.) Buurman (206.57), Parkinson (16.57), Hammes (15.57), Christian (8.57), Shaw (5), Holden (3.57), Payton (0.57)
16	FDJ Nouvelle-Aquitaine Futuroscope	590.02	11 riders Gillow (145.86), Fournier (139.46), Demay (105.60), Slik (63.46), Duval (60.86), Kitchen (42.46), Tenniglo (21.46), Bravard (3.86), Grossetête (3), Guilman (3), Richioud (1)
17	Team Virtu Cycling	512 (Note: Listed by UCI on 499.5 points, missing Louise Norman Hansen's points from the Postnord UCI WWT Vårgårda WestSweden TTT.)	10 riders Guarischi (250.50), Siggaard (97.50), Kröger (51.50), C. Koster (24), Aalerud (19), Pawłowska (19), Penton (18), Moberg (15), Norman Hansen (12.50), Schmidt (5)
18	UnitedHealthcare	419	K. Hall (290), Thomas (109), (Note: Thomas' tally includes 46 points earned at the Holland Ladies Tour, where UnitedHealthcare were not competing.) Hanson (10), Peñuela (5), L. Hall (5)
19	Hitec Products–Birk Sport	338.98	10 riders Becker (254), Andersen (37.83), Frapporti (16), Lorvik (8.83), Kessler (7), Solvang (4.83), Heine (4.83), Møllebro (3), Thorsen (1.83), Gulliksen (0.83)
20	Bepink	307	Magnaldi (208), Guderzo (48.50), (Note: Guderzo scored 33 points with Hitec Products–Birk Sport prior to leaving the team in June 2018. Guderzo joined Bepink in July 2018, and all points were transferred.) Nosková (25), Sperotto (12.50), Pattaro (5.50), Valsecchi (2.50), Steigenga (2.50), Ragusa (2.50)
42 teams scored points
