= 2018 Liège–Bastogne–Liège Femmes =

2018 UCI Women's World Tour, race 9 of 24
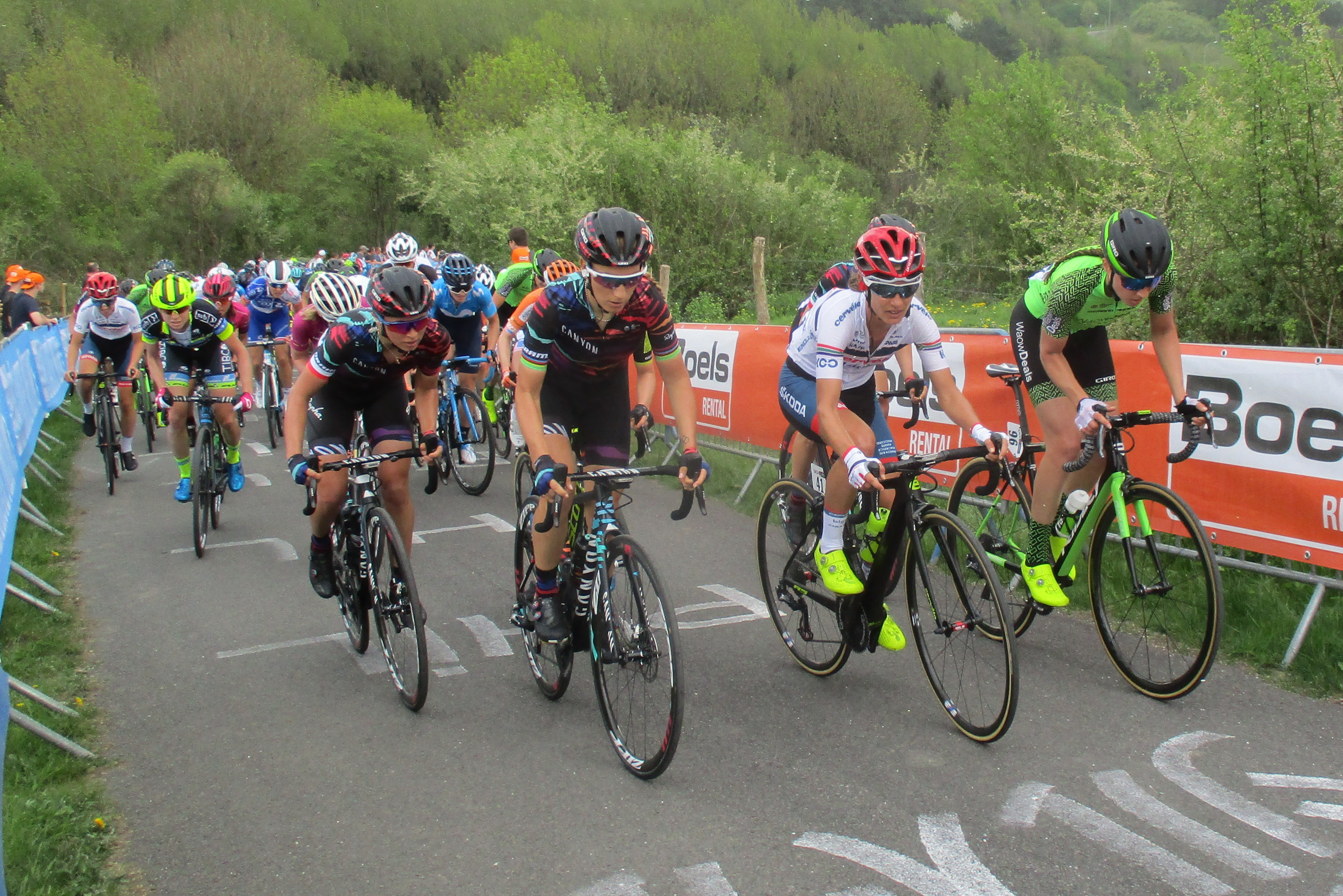
- From left to right: Kasia Niewiadoma, Pauline Ferrand-Prévot, Ashleigh Moolman and Sabrina Stultiens leading the peloton on the Côte de La Redoute, at 36 km from the finish.

Race details
- Dates: 22 April 2018
- Distance: 135.5 km (84.2 mi)
- Winning time: 3h 14' 23"

Results
	Winner	Anna van der Breggen (NED)	(Boels–Dolmans)
	Second	Amanda Spratt (AUS)	(Mitchelton–Scott)
	Third	Annemiek van Vleuten (NED)	(Mitchelton–Scott)

The second edition of Liège–Bastogne–Liège Femmes, a road cycling one-day race in Belgium, was held on 22 April 2018. It was the ninth event of the 2018 UCI Women's World Tour. The race started in Bastogne and finished in Ans, containing four categorized climbs, covering a total distance of 135.5 km.

Anna van der Breggen won the race after she broke clear from Amanda Spratt on the uphill run-up towards the finish. Annemiek van Vleuten was third. It was van der Breggen's second Ardennes classics win of the week after she won Flèche Wallonne, and her fourth World Tour one-day victory of 2018.

== Route ==
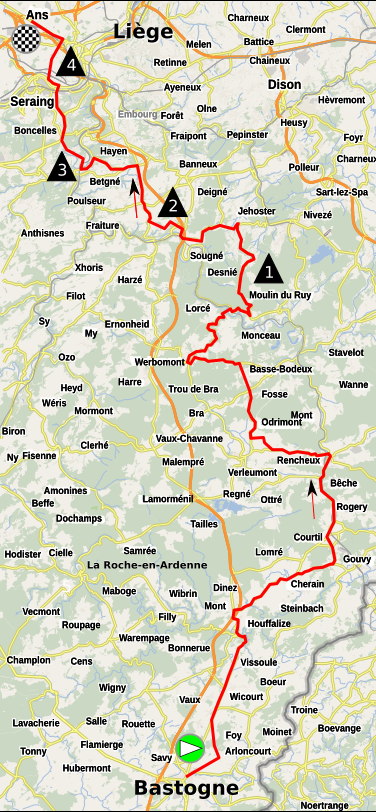
Route of the 2018 women's event

The route was identical to that of the 2017 event. At 135.5 km, the race was approximately half the distance of the men's event. It started in Bastogne, from where it headed north past Liège to finish in the industrial suburb of Ans on the same location as the men's race. The route featured four categorized climbs: the Côte de la Vecquée, Côte de La Redoute, Côte de la Roche aux faucons and Côte de Saint-Nicolas. The top of the last climb of Saint-Nicolas comes at 5.5 km from the finish.

== Teams ==
Twenty-three teams, each with a maximum of six riders, started the race:

Professional women's teams

- Boels–Dolmans
- Canyon//SRAM
- Mitchelton–Scott
- FDJ Nouvelle-Aquitaine Futuroscope
- Cervélo–Bigla Pro Cycling
- Team Sunweb
- Alé–Cipollini
- Wiggle High5
- BTC City Ljubljana
- WaowDeals Pro Cycling
- Cylance Pro Cycling
- Team Virtu Cycling
- Hitec Products–Birk Sport
- Astana
- Bepink
- Trek–Drops
- Valcar–PBM
- Lotto–Soudal Ladies
- Movistar Team
- Tibco–Silicon Valley Bank
- Doltcini–Van Eyck Sport
- Experza–Footlogix
- Health Mate–Cyclelive Team

== Race summary ==
UCI Report

20 riders remained at the front by the top of the climb of La Redoute, with 36 km to go. Pauline Ferrand-Prévot broke away after the top and soon had a 55-second lead, but was caught back by the chasers on the Côte de la Roche-aux-Faucons, at 20 km from the finish. Anna van der Breggen, Annemiek van Vleuten, Ashleigh Moolman and Megan Guarnier had a 25-second lead on the top, but were joined by six others 2 km later. Australian Amanda Spratt immediately accelerated and had a gap of 55 seconds with 10 km to go.

On the Côte de Saint-Nicolas, Anna van der Breggen, Moolman and van Vleuten attacked from the chase group, and at the top van der Breggen had dropped the two others to chase Spratt on her own. The Dutch olympic champion caught Spratt with 5 km to go and powered away on the uphill run-in to the finish to win her second consecutive Liège–Bastogne–Liège. Spratt finished second at 6 seconds, van Vleuten outsprinted Moolman for third place.

== Results ==
Final general classification

Rank	Rider	Team	Time
1	Anna van der Breggen (NED)	Boels–Dolmans	3h 34' 23"
2	Amanda Spratt (AUS)	Mitchelton–Scott	+ 6"
3	Annemiek van Vleuten (NED)	Mitchelton–Scott	+ 58"
4	Ashleigh Moolman (RSA)	Cervélo–Bigla Pro Cycling	+ 1' 00"
5	Ellen van Dijk (NED)	Team Sunweb	+ 1' 13"
6	Sabrina Stultiens (NED)	WaowDeals Pro Cycling	s.t.
7	Pauline Ferrand-Prévot (FRA)	Canyon//SRAM	s.t.
8	Megan Guarnier (USA)	Boels–Dolmans	s.t.
9	Shara Gillow (AUS)	FDJ Nouvelle-Aquitaine Futuroscope	s.t.
10	Rossella Ratto (ITA)	Cylance Pro Cycling	s.t.

== UCI World Tour ==
=== Attributed points ===
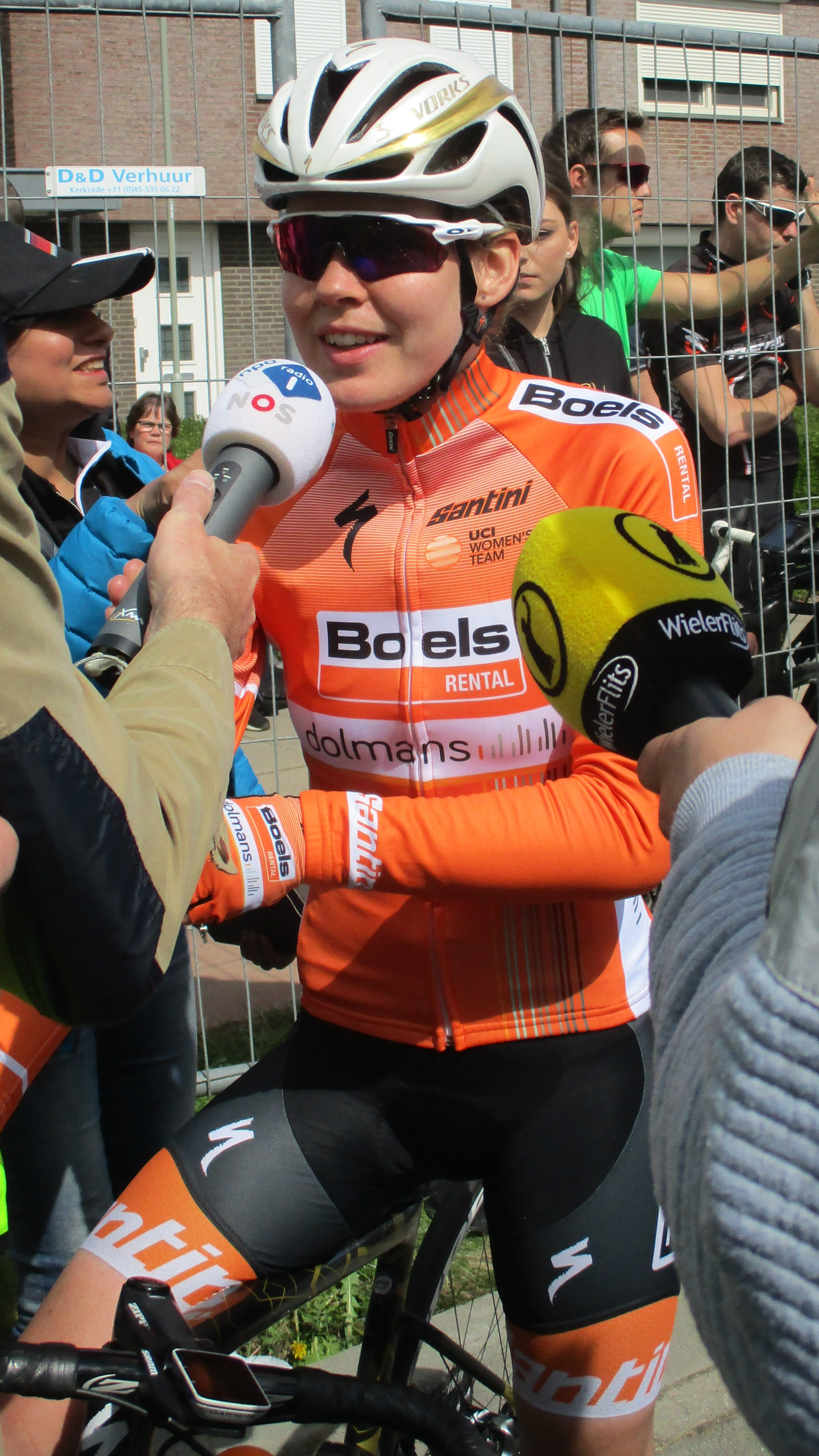
Race winner Anna van der Breggen (pictured at the 2018 Amstel Gold Race) increased her lead in the 2018 UCI Women's World Tour.

Position	1st	2nd	3rd	4th	5th	6th	7th	8th	9th	10th	11th	12th	13th	14th	15th	16-30th	31-40th
World Tour points	200	150	125	100	85	70	60	50	40	35	30	25	20	15	10	5	3

=== Individual ranking after Liège–Bastogne–Liège ===
World Tour points classification

Rank	Rider	Team	Points
1	Anna van der Breggen (NED)	Boels–Dolmans	808
2	Chantal Blaak (NED)	Boels–Dolmans	538
3	Amanda Spratt (AUS)	Mitchelton–Scott	520
4	Ashleigh Moolman (RSA)	Cervélo–Bigla Pro Cycling	465
5	Amy Pieters (NED)	Boels–Dolmans	455
6	Katarzyna Niewiadoma (POL)	Canyon//SRAM	415
7	Jolien D'Hoore (BEL)	Mitchelton–Scott	405
8	Marta Bastianelli (ITA)	Alé–Cipollini	370
9	Annemiek van Vleuten (NED)	Mitchelton–Scott	360
10	Chloe Hosking (AUS)	Alé–Cipollini	280
