= 2018 Three Days of Bruges–De Panne (women's race) =

2018 Women's Three Days of Bruges–De Panne
2018 UCI Women's World Tour, race 4 of 24
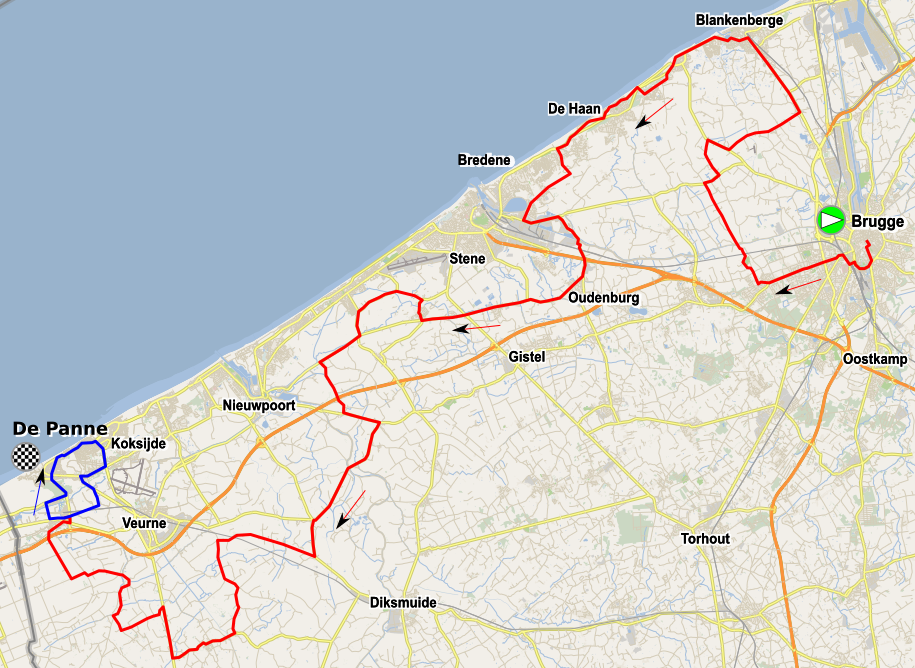

Race details
- Dates: 22 March 2018
- Stages: 1
- Distance: 151.7 km (94.3 mi)
- Winning time: 3h 52' 23"

Results
| | Winner | Jolien D'Hoore (BEL) |
| | Second | Chloe Hosking (AUS) |
| | Third | Christine Majerus (LUX) |

The first running of the women's event of the Three Days of Bruges–De Panne was held on 22 March 2018. It started in Bruges and finished in De Panne with two 15 km (9.3 mi) loops between De Panne and Koksijde, totaling 151.7 km (94.3 mi). It was the fourth leg of the 2018 UCI Women's World Tour. Belgian Jolien D'Hoore, who was unaware she was sprinting for victory, won the race in a sprint.

== Teams ==
Twenty-four teams entered the race. Each team had a maximum of six riders:

Professional women's teams

- Boels–Dolmans
- Alé–Cipollini
- BTC City Ljubljana
- Canyon//SRAM
- Cervélo–Bigla Pro Cycling
- Cylance Pro Cycling
- FDJ Nouvelle-Aquitaine Futuroscope
- Hitec Products–Birk Sport
- Mitchelton–Scott
- Team Sunweb
- Valcar–PBM
- WaowDeals Pro Cycling
- Wiggle High5
- Aromitalia Vaiano
- Doltcini–Van Eyck Sport
- Experza–Footlogix
- Health Mate–Cyclelive Team
- Lotto–Soudal Ladies
- Movistar Team
- Parkhotel Valkenburg
- Tibco–Silicon Valley Bank
- Trek–Drops
- WNT–Rotor Pro Cycling
- Team Virtu Cycling

== Result ==
Final general classification

| Rank | Rider | Team | Time |
|---|---|---|---|
| 1 | Jolien D'Hoore (BEL) | Mitchelton–Scott | 3h 52' 23" |
| 2 | Chloe Hosking (AUS) | Alé–Cipollini | s.t. |
| 3 | Christine Majerus (LUX) | Boels–Dolmans | s.t. |
| 4 | Lorena Wiebes (NED) | Parkhotel Valkenburg | s.t. |
| 5 | Lisa Brennauer (GER) | Wiggle High5 | s.t. |
| 6 | Maria Giulia Confalonieri (ITA) | Valcar–PBM | s.t. |
| 7 | Sheyla Gutiérrez (ESP) | Cylance Pro Cycling | s.t. |
| 8 | Jeanne Korevaar (NED) | WaowDeals Pro Cycling | s.t. |
| 9 | Tiffany Cromwell (AUS) | Canyon//SRAM | s.t. |
| 10 | Christina Siggaard (DEN) | Team Virtu Cycling | s.t. |
