= 2018 La Course by Le Tour de France =

2018 UCI Women's World Tour, race 15 of 24
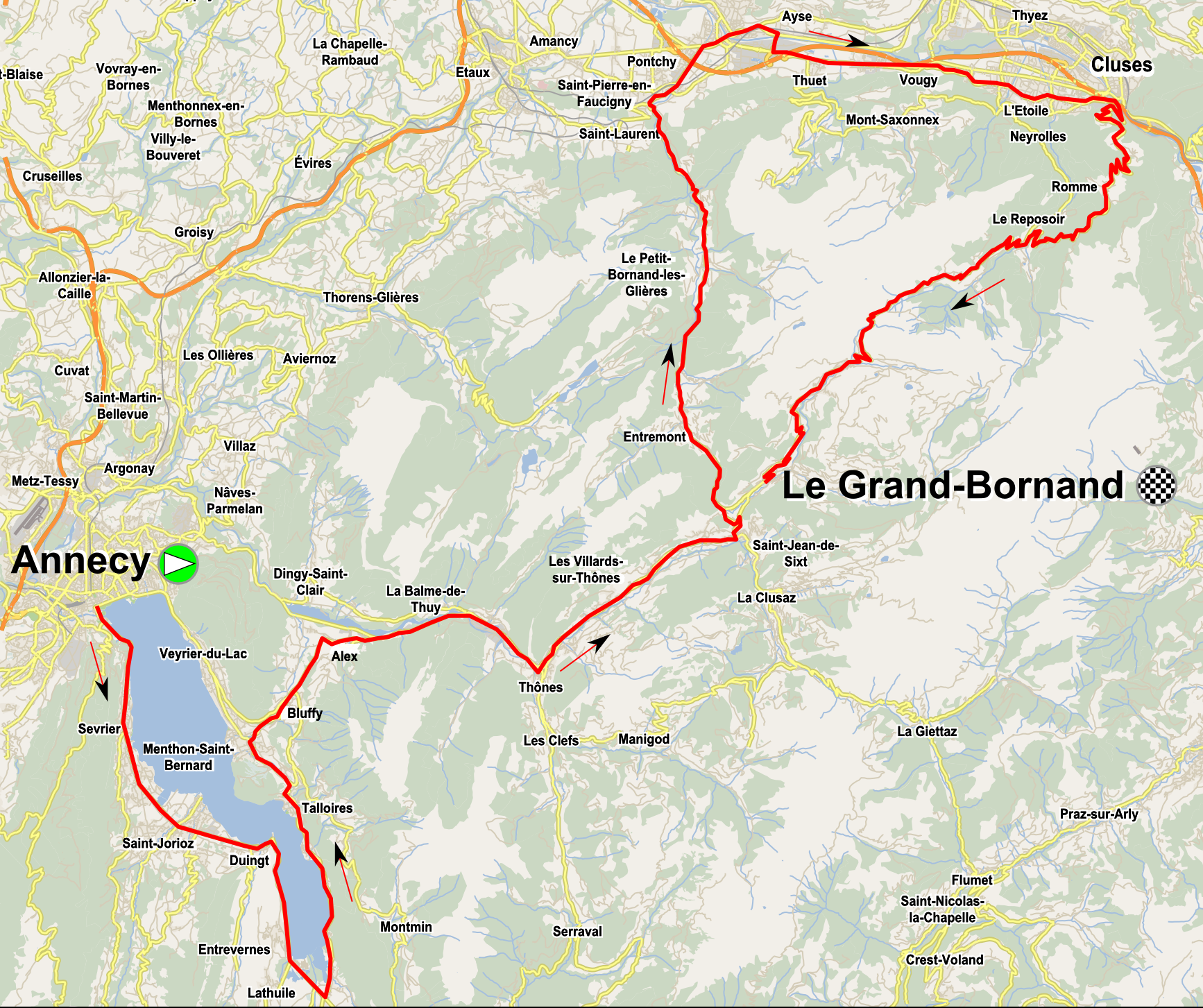
- Course

Race details
- Dates: 17 July 2018
- Stages: 1
- Distance: 118 km (73 mi)

Results
	Winner	Annemiek van Vleuten (NED)	(Mitchelton–Scott)
	Second	Anna van der Breggen (NED)	(Boels–Dolmans)
	Third	Ashleigh Moolman-Pasio (RSA)	(Cervélo–Bigla Pro Cycling)
Jersey awarded to the mountains classification winner	Mountains	Cecilie Uttrup Ludwig (DEN)	(Cervélo–Bigla Pro Cycling)
Jersey awarded to the combativity classification winner	Combativity	Leah Thomas (USA)	(UnitedHealthcare Pro Cycling)

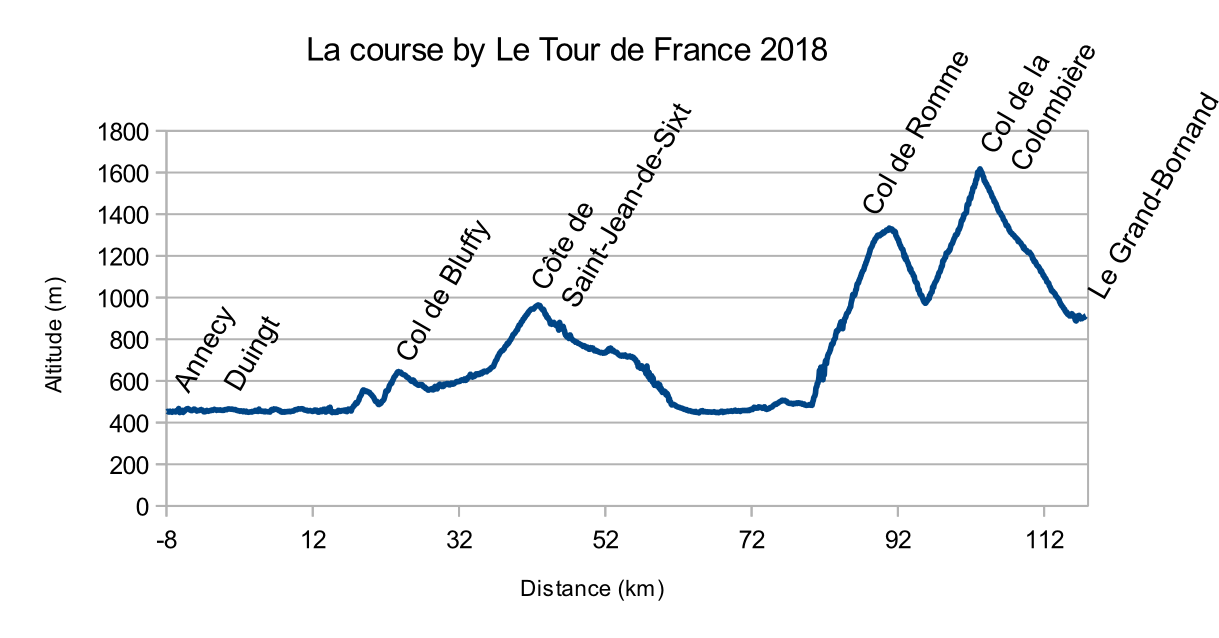
Course profile

The 2018 La Course by Le Tour de France was the fifth edition of La Course by Le Tour de France, a women's cycling race held in France. It took place on 17 July 2018 and was the fifteenth event on the 2018 UCI Women's World Tour. The event was organised by ASO, which also organises the Tour de France. The race was won by Dutch rider Annemiek van Vleuten of Mitchelton-Scott.

== Route and format ==
The race returned to a single stage format in 2018, following the criticism of the 2017 edition's pursuit stage. This was welcomed by the peloton and media.

The race ran from Duingt, at the shores of Lake Annecy, to Le Grand Bornand, covering 118 km, and took in the Col de la Colombière. It was held before stage 10 of the men's 2018 Tour de France, which also finished in Le Grand Bornand. The finale was identical to the men's stage. After the top of the 16.3 km long Col de la Colombière, 15 km was left to the finish.

== Teams ==
UCI Women's Teams

- Boels–Dolmans
- Mitchelton–Scott
- Cervélo-Bigla Pro Cycling
- Canyon-SRAM
- Team Sunweb
- WaowDeals Pro Cycling
- BTC City Ljubljana
- FDJ Nouvelle-Aquitaine Futuroscope
- Cylance Pro Cycling
- UnitedHealthcare Pro Cycling
- Trek-Drops
- Bepink
- Movistar Team
- Team TIBCO - SVB
- Wiggle High5
- Astana Women's Team
- Lotto Soudal Ladies
- Alé Cipollini
- Valcar–PBM
- Cogeas - Mettler Pro Cycling Team

== Results ==
The race finished in a finish of two Dutch cyclists with Annemiek van Vleuten beating 2015 race champion Anna van der Breggen to retain the trophy.

Result
Rank	Rider	Team	Time
1	Annemiek van Vleuten (NED)	Mitchelton–Scott	3h 20' 43"
2	Anna van der Breggen (NED)	Boels–Dolmans	+ 1"
3	Ashleigh Moolman-Pasio (RSA)	Cervélo–Bigla Pro Cycling	+ 1' 22"
4	Cecilie Uttrup Ludwig (DEN)	Cervélo–Bigla Pro Cycling	+ 1' 58"
5	Megan Guarnier (USA)	Boels–Dolmans	+ 2' 19"
6	Katarzyna Niewiadoma (POL)	Canyon//SRAM	+ 2' 19"
7	Katharine Hall (USA)	UnitedHealthcare	+ 2' 22"
8	Amanda Spratt (AUS)	Mitchelton–Scott	+ 2' 22"
9	Ane Santesteban (ESP)	Alé–Cipollini	+ 2' 24"
10	Erica Magnaldi (ITA)	Bepink	+ 2' 24"

== See also ==
- 2018 in women's road cycling
