= 2017 Omloop Het Nieuwsblad (women's race) =

Race details
- Dates: 25 February 2017
- Stages: 1
- Distance: 122 km (76 mi)
- Winning time: 3h 19' 58"

Results
	Winner	Lucinda Brand (NED)	(Team Sunweb)
	Second	Chantal van den Broek-Blaak (NED)	(Boels–Dolmans)
	Third	Annemiek van Vleuten (NED)	(Orica–Scott)

The 2017 Omloop Het Nieuwsblad was the 12th edition of the women's Omloop Het Nieuwsblad road cycling one-day race, which was held on 25 February. The race started and finished in Ghent, covering 122 km (76 mi) in the province of East Flanders.

== Teams ==
Twenty-eight teams participated in the race.

- Boels–Dolmans
- Lotto–Soudal Ladies
- Sport Vlaanderen–Guill D'or
- Lensworld–Kuota
- Lares–Waowdeals
- Wiggle High5
- Alé–Cipollini
- Astana
- Bepink–Cogeas
- Bizkaia–Durango
- Canyon//SRAM
- Cervélo–Bigla Pro Cycling
- Colavita/Bianchi
- Cylance Pro Cycling
- Drops
- FDJ Nouvelle-Aquitaine Futuroscope
- Team Hitec Products
- Lointek
- WM3 Energie
- Orica–Scott
- Parkhotel Valkenburg–Destil
- Team Virtu Cycling
- Team Sunweb
- Germany national cycling team
- Keukens Redant Cycling Team
- De Sprinters Malderen
- Isorex Cycling Team
- Autoglas Wetteren

== Results ==
Final general classification
Rank	Rider	Team	Time
1	Lucinda Brand (NED)	Team Sunweb	3h 19' 58"
2	Chantal van den Broek-Blaak (NED)	Boels–Dolmans	+ 15"
3	Annemiek van Vleuten (NED)	Orica–Scott	+ 15"
4	Ellen van Dijk (NED)	Team Sunweb	+ 15"
5	Elisa Longo Borghini (ITA)	Wiggle High5	+ 15"
6	Amanda Spratt (AUS)	Orica–Scott	+ 28"
7	Jolien D'Hoore (BEL)	Wiggle High5	+ 1' 47"
8	Sheyla Gutiérrez (ESP)	Cylance Pro Cycling	+ 1' 47"
9	Danielle Rowe (GBR)	Cylance Pro Cycling	+ 1' 47"
10	Gracie Elvin (AUS)	Orica–Scott	+ 1' 47"

== See also ==
- 2017 in women's road cycling
