= 2018 Strade Bianche Women =

2018 UCI Women's World Tour, race 1 of 24
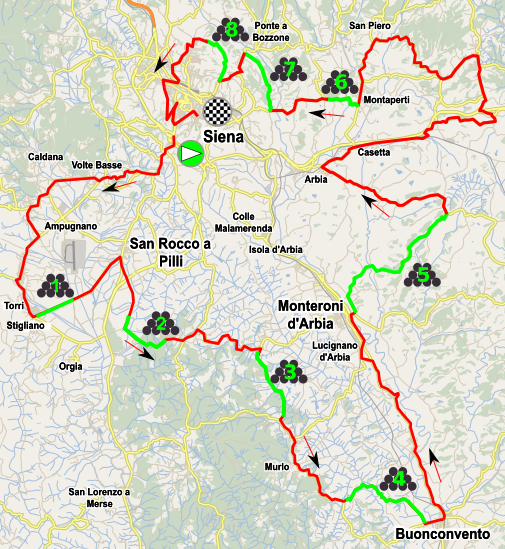

Race details
- Dates: 3 March 2018
- Stages: 1
- Distance: 136 km (85 mi)
- Winning time: 4h 10' 48"

Results
	Winner	Anna van der Breggen (NED)
	Second	Katarzyna Niewiadoma (POL)
	Third	Elisa Longo Borghini (ITA)

The fourth edition of the Women's Strade Bianche was held on 3 March 2018. It was the first leg of the 2018 UCI Women's World Tour. The race was run in abysmal weather and was won by Dutch rider Anna van der Breggen of the Boels–Dolmans team, after an attack on the penultimate gravel sector of Colle Pinzuto at 17 km from the finish.

== Teams ==
Twenty-four teams entered the race. Each team had a maximum of six riders:

Professional women's teams

- Wiggle High5
- Alé–Cipollini
- Aromitalia Vaiano
- Astana
- Bepink
- Boels–Dolmans
- BTC City Ljubljana
- Canyon//SRAM
- Cervélo–Bigla Pro Cycling
- Cylance Pro Cycling
- Eurotarget–Bianchi–Vitasana
- FDJ Nouvelle-Aquitaine Futuroscope
- Hitec Products–Birk Sport
- Lotto–Soudal Ladies
- Mitchelton–Scott
- Movistar Team
- S.C. Michela Fanini Rox
- Servetto–Stradalli Cycle–Alurecycling
- Team Sunweb
- Team Virtu Cycling
- Top Girls Fassa Bortolo
- Trek–Drops
- Valcar–PBM
- WaowDeals Pro Cycling

== Results ==
Final general classification

Rank	Rider	Team	Time
1	Anna van der Breggen (NED)	Boels–Dolmans	4h 10' 48"
2	Katarzyna Niewiadoma (POL)	Canyon//SRAM	+ 49"
3	Elisa Longo Borghini (ITA)	Wiggle High5	+ 59"
4	Chantal Blaak (NED)	Boels–Dolmans	+ 1' 32"
5	Lucy Kennedy (AUS)	Mitchelton–Scott	s.t.
6	Janneke Ensing (NED)	Alé–Cipollini	+ 1' 37"
7	Amanda Spratt (AUS)	Mitchelton–Scott	+ 1' 41"
8	Ashleigh Moolman (RSA)	Cervélo–Bigla Pro Cycling	+ 2' 25"
9	Ellen van Dijk (NED)	Team Sunweb	+ 2' 36"
10	Cecilie Uttrup Ludwig (DEN)	Cervélo–Bigla Pro Cycling	+ 2' 50"

== See also ==
- 2018 in women's road cycling
- 2018 UCI Women's World Tour
