= 2018 Trofeo Alfredo Binda-Comune di Cittiglio =

2018 UCI Women's World Tour, race 3 of 24
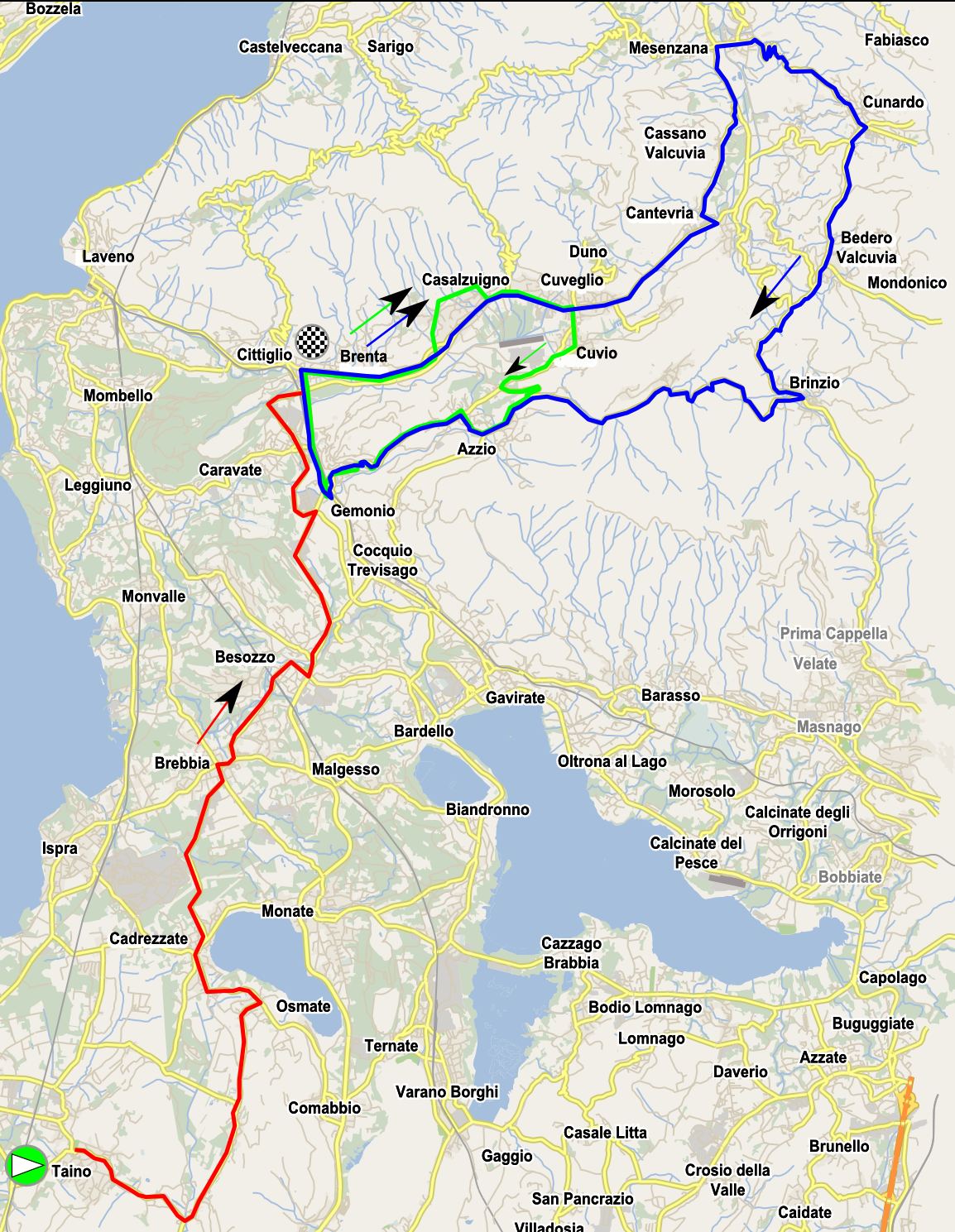
- Route of the event

Race details
- Dates: 18 March 2018
- Distance: 131.3 km (81.6 mi)
- Winning time: 3h 32' 53"

Results
	Winner	Kasia Niewiadoma (POL)	(Canyon//SRAM)
	Second	Chantal Blaak (NED)	(Boels–Dolmans)
	Third	Marianne Vos (NED)	(WaowDeals Pro Cycling)

UCI Report

The 2018 Trofeo Alfredo Binda-Comune di Cittiglio was the 43rd running of the Trofeo Alfredo Binda, a women's cycling race in Italy. It was the third event of the 2018 UCI Women's World Tour season and was held on 18 March 2017. The race started in Gavirate and finished in Cittiglio, on the outskirts of Lago Maggiore in Northwest Italy.

Polish rider Kasia Niewiadoma won the race after a solo attack. A group of 20 riders was formed during the final lap, on the Colle del Casale, from which Niewiadoma broke clear at 8 km from the finish. She held her lead to claim her third World Tour win. Chantal Blaak won the sprint for second place at 23 seconds ahead of Marianne Vos.

== Teams ==
Twenty-four teams participated in the race. Each team had a maximum of six riders:

Professional women's teams

- Team Sunweb
- Boels–Dolmans
- Mitchelton–Scott
- Cervélo–Bigla Pro Cycling
- Canyon//SRAM
- Wiggle High5
- WaowDeals Pro Cycling
- Alé–Cipollini
- Cylance Pro Cycling
- FDJ Nouvelle-Aquitaine Futuroscope
- BTC City Ljubljana
- Hitec Products–Birk Sport
- Astana
- Valcar–PBM
- Lotto–Soudal Ladies
- Bepink
- Tibco–Silicon Valley Bank
- Trek–Drops
- Aromitalia Vaiano
- Movistar Team
- Doltcini–Van Eyck Sport
- S.C. Michela Fanini Rox
- Eurotarget–Bianchi–Vitasana
- Top Girls Fassa Bortolo

== Results ==
Final general classification

Rank	Rider	Team	Time
1	Katarzyna Niewiadoma (POL)	Canyon//SRAM	3h 32' 53"
2	Chantal Blaak (NED)	Boels–Dolmans	+ 23"
3	Marianne Vos (NED)	WaowDeals Pro Cycling	s.t.
4	Amanda Spratt (AUS)	Mitchelton–Scott	s.t.
5	Alena Amialiusik (BLR)	Canyon//SRAM	s.t.
6	Pauline Ferrand-Prévot (FRA)	Canyon//SRAM	s.t.
7	Cecilie Uttrup Ludwig (DEN)	Cervélo–Bigla Pro Cycling	s.t.
8	Karol-Ann Canuel (CAN)	Boels–Dolmans	s.t.
9	Lucy Kennedy (AUS)	Mitchelton–Scott	s.t.
10	Elisa Longo Borghini (ITA)	Wiggle High5	s.t.

== See also ==
- 2018 in women's road cycling
