= 2018 Amstel Gold Race (women's race) =

2018 UCI Women's World Tour, race 7 of 24
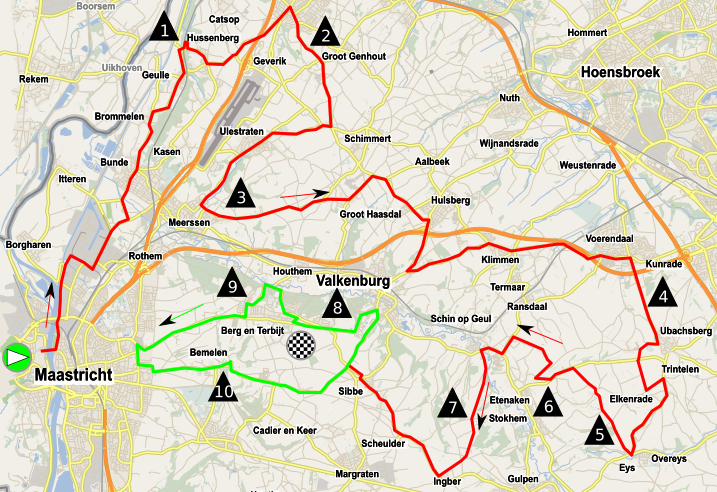

Race details
- Dates: 15 April 2018
- Stages: 1
- Distance: 116.9 km (72.6 mi)

Results
	Winner	Chantal Blaak (NED)	(Boels–Dolmans)
	Second	Lucinda Brand (NED)	(Team Sunweb)
	Third	Amanda Spratt (AUS)	(Mitchelton–Scott)

The fifth edition of the Amstel Gold Race for Women was a road cycling one-day race held on 15 April 2018 in the Netherlands. It was the seventh event of the 2018 UCI Women's World Tour. The race started in Maastricht and finished in Berg en Terblijt, containing 17 categorized climbs and covering a total distance of 116.9 km.

Dutch rider Chantal Blaak, wearing the rainbow jersey, won the race in a three-up sprint with Lucinda Brand and Amanda Spratt.

== Route ==
The race started on Maastricht's Markt, the city's central market square, and finished in Berg en Terblijt, covering 116.9 km. The route was made up of one bigger loop in the south of Limburg, followed by three 18 km loops centering around Valkenburg which featured the Geulhemmerberg, Bemelerberg and Cauberg climbs. In total, the route contained 17 categorized hills, usually short but with a varying gradient and coming in quick succession throughout the race. The Cauberg, the most difficult and iconic passage, was addressed four times; once more than during the men's race. The fourth crossing of the Cauberg was also the last climb of the day. From the top, there was a 1.7 km run-in to the finish line in Berg en Terblijt.

== Teams ==
Twenty-two teams participated in the race. Each team had a maximum of six riders:

Professional women's teams

- Boels–Dolmans
- Mitchelton–Scott
- Team Sunweb
- Canyon//SRAM
- Cervélo–Bigla Pro Cycling
- Alé–Cipollini
- Wiggle High5
- WaowDeals Pro Cycling
- Cylance Pro Cycling
- Experza–Footlogix
- FDJ Nouvelle-Aquitaine Futuroscope
- BTC City Ljubljana
- Hitec Products–Birk Sport
- Team Virtu Cycling
- Valcar–PBM
- Astana
- Lotto–Soudal Ladies
- Trek–Drops
- Movistar Team
- Parkhotel Valkenburg
- Aromitalia Vaiano
- Doltcini–Van Eyck Sport

== Result ==
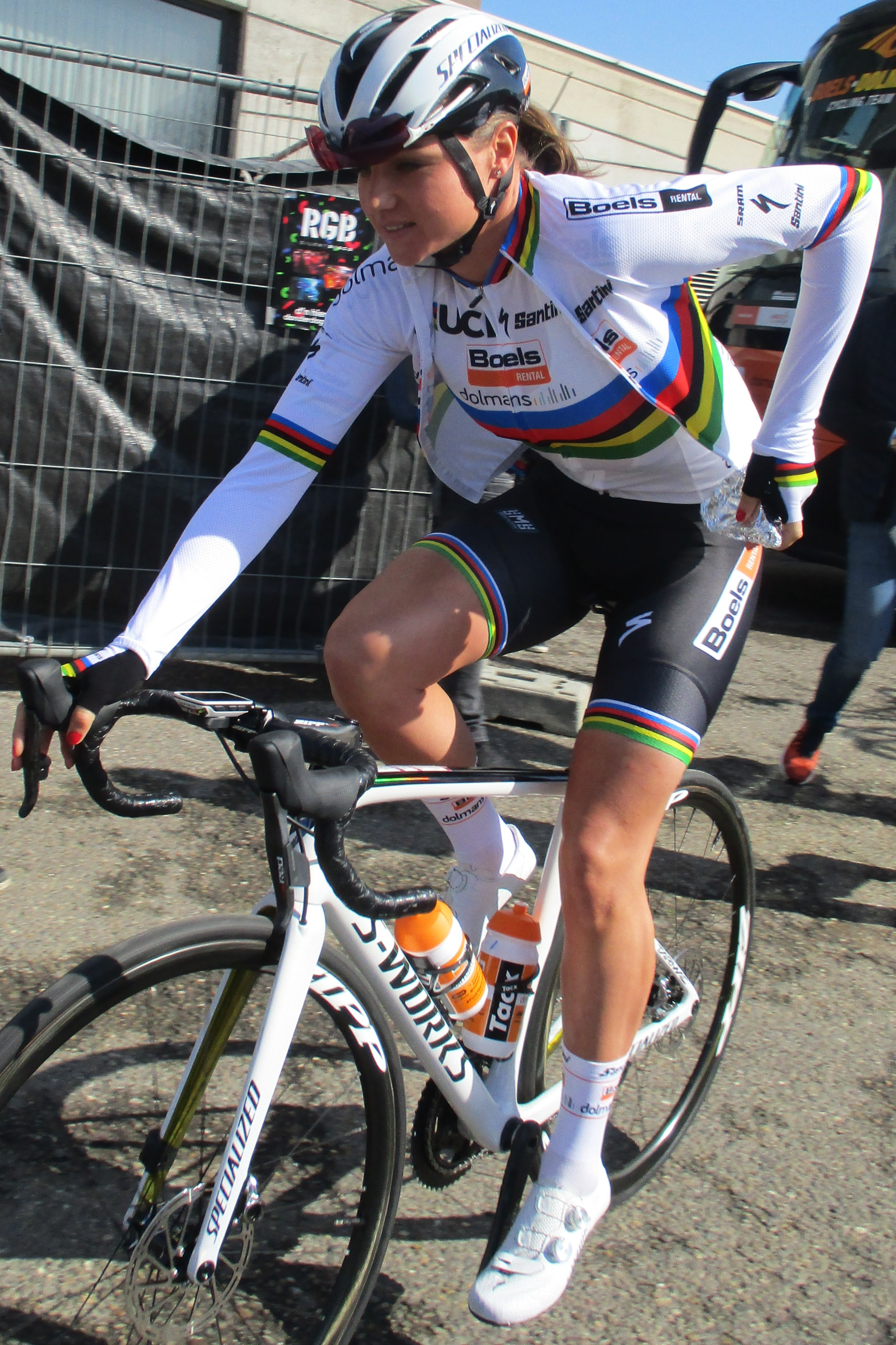
Chantal Blaak before the start of the race in Maastricht.

Final general classification

Rank	Rider	Team	Time
1	Chantal Blaak (NED)	Boels–Dolmans	3h 24' 17"
2	Lucinda Brand (NED)	Team Sunweb	s.t.
3	Amanda Spratt (AUS)	Mitchelton–Scott	+ 3"
4	Riejanne Markus (NED)	WaowDeals Pro Cycling	+ 4"
5	Alexis Ryan (USA)	Canyon//SRAM	+ 6"
6	Audrey Cordon-Ragot (FRA)	Wiggle High5	+ 14"
7	Giorgia Bronzini (ITA)	Cylance Pro Cycling	+ 41"
8	Lotta Lepistö (FIN)	Cervélo–Bigla Pro Cycling	+ 56"
9	Eugenia Bujak (SLO)	BTC City Ljubljana	+ 1' 30"
10	Marianne Vos (NED)	WaowDeals Pro Cycling	s.t.
