= Amanda Spratt =

Australian cyclist (born 1987)

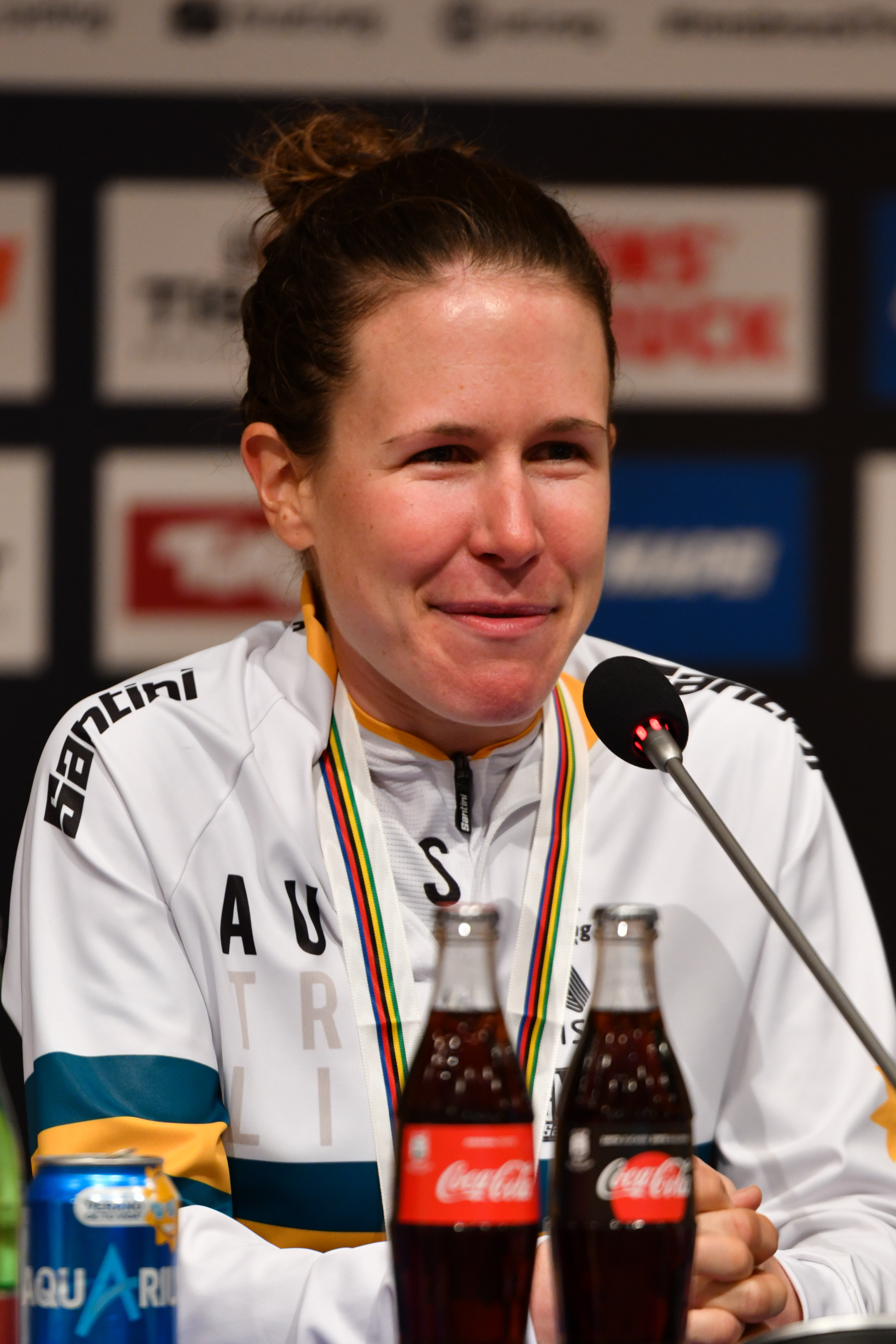
- Amanda Spratt in 2018

Personal information
- Full name: Amanda Spratt
- Nickname: Spratty
- Born: 17 September 1987 (age 39) Penrith, New South Wales, Australia
- Height: 161 cm (5 ft 3 in)
- Weight: 55 kg (121 lb)

Cycling career
- Sport: Cycling
- Current team: Trek–Segafredo
- Disciplines: Road; Track (former)
- Role: Rider
- Rider type: All-rounder

Amateur team
- –: Penrith Cycling Club

Professional teams
- 2012–2022: Orica–AIS
- 2023–: Trek–Segafredo

Major wins
- One day races & Classics National Road Race Championships (2012, 2016, 2020) Cadel Evans Great Ocean Road Race (2016) Stage races Emakumeen Euskal Bira (2018) Women's Tour Down Under (2017, 2018, 2019) Tour de Feminin-O cenu Českého Švýcarska (2011)
Medal record
Representing Australia
Women's road cycling
World Championships
Gold medal – first place	2025 Kigali	Mixed team relay
Silver medal – second place	2018 Innsbruck	Road race
Bronze medal – third place	2019 Yorkshire	Road race
Bronze medal – third place	2004 Verona	Junior time trial

Amanda Spratt (born 17 September 1987) is an Australian road cyclist, who currently rides for UCI Women's WorldTeam Lidl–Trek. She has announced her retirement, with 2026 being her final season in the pro peloton.

Spratt was selected to represent Australia at the 2012 London and 2016 Rio Olympics. In 2012, 2016 and 2020 she won the Australian National Road Race Championships in Buninyong, Victoria. In 2018, she secured the silver medal in the UCI Road World Championships in Innsbruck, Austria.

== Personal ==
Spratt, nicknamed "Spratty", was born on 17 September 1987 in Penrith, New South Wales, which is a suburb of Sydney. She went to Springwood Public School before going to Blue Mountains Grammar School for high school. From 2007 to 2008, she attended Charles Sturt University where she earned a University Certificate in Business. As of 2012, she lived in Springwood, New South Wales.

As of 2026, she lived in Switzerland with her wife, who is German.

Spratt is a former member of the Riders Council of The Cyclists' Alliance.

== Cycling ==
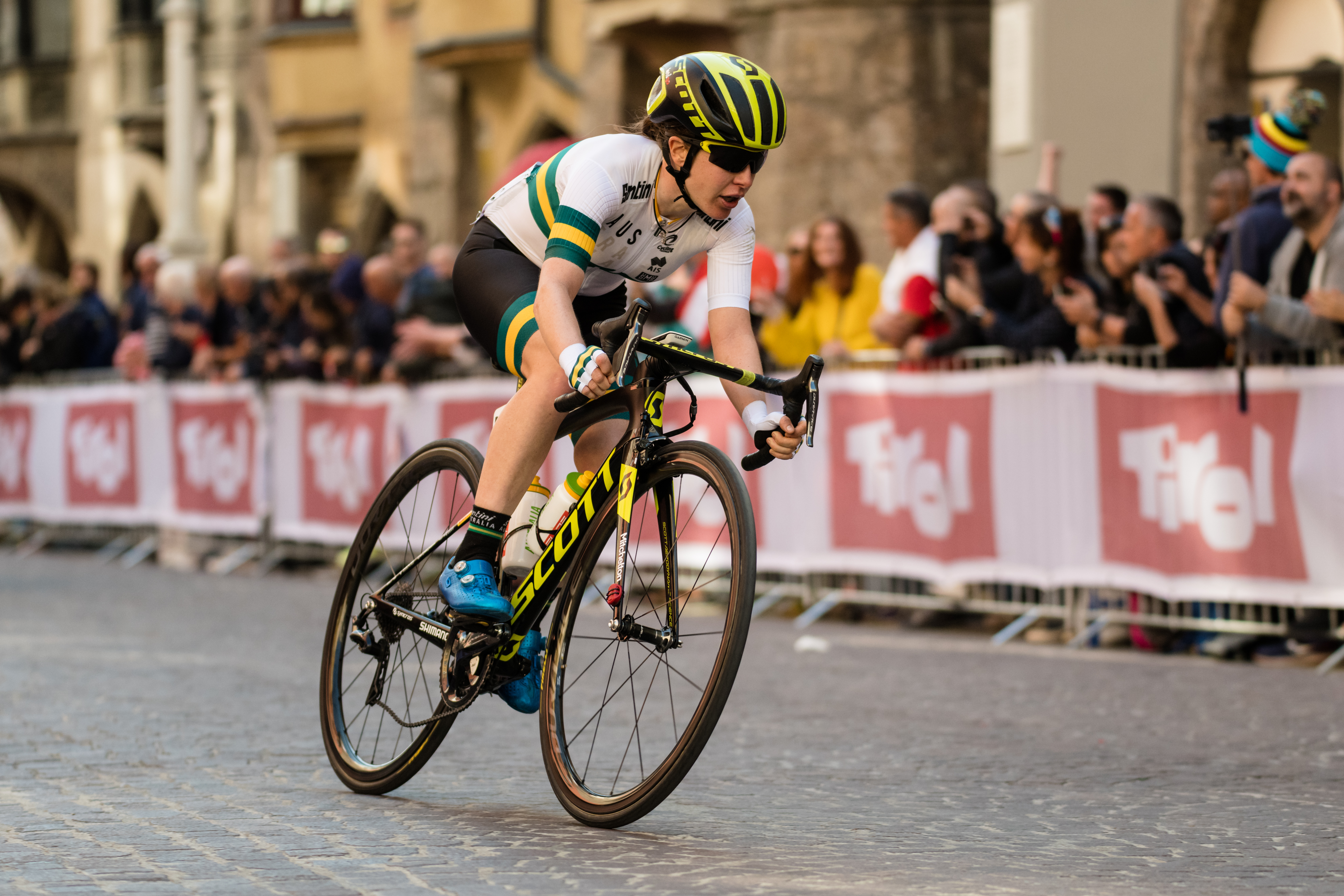
Amanda Spratt racing in the 2018 UCI Road World Championships at Innsbruck

Spratt raced in BMX events as a junior and competed in the BMX World Championships in Melbourne when she was 11. She began road and track racing when she was twelve years old. She has been coached by Martin Barras since 2009 and is also coached by Gary Sutton. Her primary training base is in Australia's Blue Mountains region, with a secondary training base in Varase, Italy where she lives eight months a year. She is a member of the Penrith Cycling Club. She has held a cycling scholarship with the Australian Institute of Sport and the NSW Institute of Sport.

Spratt competed at the 2004 World Junior Track Championships in the United States. She competed at the 2004 Commonwealth Youth Games. She competed at the 2004 Junior Road World Championships in Italy. She missed most of the 2009 cycling season because of a back injury. She competed at the 2010 UCI Road World Championships. She finished eleventh at the 2011 Giro di Toscana Femminile in Italy. She finished fourth at the 2011 Sweden World Cup teams time trial in Vårgårda, Sweden. She finished first at the 2011 Tour de Feminine Krasna Lipa in the Czech Republic. She finished eighth at the 2011 Women's Tour of New Zealand. She finished first in the road race and fourth in the individual time trial at the 2012 Australia Road National Championships in Buninyong, Australia. She finished second at the 2012 Jayco Bay Classic in Victoria, Australia. She finished fourth at the 2012 Ronde van Gelderland in the Netherlands. She was selected to represent Australia at the 2012 Summer Olympics in the women's road race, her first Olympics. She finished outside the time limit.

In 2018, Spratt elected to forgo a debut senior Commonwealth Games representation for Australia on the Gold Coast, to focus on an Ardennes campaign in Europe. She achieved her first ever one-day podium at World Tour or World Cup level, with a third placing at the Amstel Gold Race in April. Then in May, she won her first Women's World Tour race with a large enough leading margin to move up ten places on the final stage to also win the general classification at Emakumeen Euskal Bira.

In 2021, Spratt was selected in the Australian team to compete in the road race at the Tokyo Olympics. Unfortunately, she was unable to finish in her event, the Women's Road Race, in very trying conditions.

== Major results ==
2004
Commonwealth Youth Games

1st Road race
1st Time trial
1st Points race

2nd Individual pursuit, National Junior Track Championships
UCI Junior Road World Championships

3rd Time trial
9th Road race

2005
2nd Individual pursuit, National Junior Track Championships
2006
2nd Points race, National Junior Track Championships
3rd Individual pursuit, Oceania Games
2007
National Track Championships

1st Team pursuit
2nd Individual pursuit
3rd Points race

2nd Time trial, National Under-23 Road Championships
2008
1st Time trial, National Under-23 Road Championships
2010
8th Overall Tour of New Zealand
2011
1st Overall Tour de Feminin-O cenu Českého Švýcarska

1st Stage 1

4th Open de Suède Vårgårda TTT
2012
National Road Championships

1st Road race
4th Time trial

3rd 7-Dorpenomloop Aalburg
4th Ronde van Gelderland
7th GP Comune di Cornaredo
9th Omloop Het Nieuwsblad
2013
3rd Team time trial, UCI Road World Championships
3rd Open de Suède Vårgårda TTT
4th Trofeo Alfredo Binda
6th Overall Thüringen Rundfahrt
7th EPZ Omloop van Borsele
8th Overall Grand Prix Elsy Jacobs
2014
2nd Team time trial, UCI Road World Championships
4th Open de Suède Vårgårda TTT
5th Road race, National Road Championships
8th Omloop van het Hageland
2015
1st Giro del Trentino Alto Adige-Südtirol
3rd Overall Tour of Norway
4th Overall Thüringen Rundfahrt
4th Cadel Evans Great Ocean Road Race
5th Overall Tour Down Under
6th SwissEver GP Cham-Hagendorn
8th Crescent Vårgårda TTT
9th Overall Emakumeen Euskal Bira
2016
1st Road race, National Road Championships
1st Cadel Evans Great Ocean Road Race
2nd Overall Thüringen Rundfahrt

1st Stage 6

5th Overall The Women's Tour
6th Durango-Durango Emakumeen Saria
7th Overall Tour Down Under
7th Crescent Vårgårda
2017
1st Overall Tour Down Under

1st Stage 1

2nd Road race, National Road Championships
5th Overall Giro d'Italia
5th Overall Emakumeen Euskal Bira

1st Stage 2

5th Durango-Durango Emakumeen Saria
6th La Course by Le Tour de France
6th Omloop Het Nieuwsblad
8th Strade Bianche
2018
1st Overall Emakumeen Euskal Bira

1st Stage 4

1st Overall Tour Down Under

1st Mountains classification
1st Stage 3

1st SwissEver GP Cham-Hagendorn
2nd Road race, UCI Road World Championships
2nd Liège–Bastogne–Liège
2nd Team time trial, Tour of Norway
3rd Overall Giro Rosa

1st Mountains classification
1st Stage 6

3rd Amstel Gold Race
4th Road race, National Road Championships
4th Trofeo Alfredo Binda
5th La Flèche Wallonne
5th GP de Plouay
6th Overall Holland Ladies Tour
7th Strade Bianche
8th La Course by Le Tour de France
2019
1st Overall Tour Down Under

1st Stage 2

2nd Road race, National Road Championships
2nd Overall Emakumeen Euskal Bira

1st Stage 2

2nd Overall Herald Sun Tour
2nd Trofeo Alfredo Binda
2nd Durango-Durango Emakumeen Saria
3rd Road race, UCI Road World Championships
3rd Overall Giro Rosa
3rd Cadel Evans Great Ocean Road Race
4th Overall Bay Classic Series

1st Stage 1

5th Overall Tour de Yorkshire
2020
1st Road race, National Road Championships
1st Stage 1 Bay Classic Series
3rd Overall Tour Down Under

1st Stage 2

3rd Cadel Evans Great Ocean Road Race
8th Durango-Durango Emakumeen Saria
10th Emakumeen Nafarroako Klasikoa
2021
4th Amstel Gold Race
9th La Flèche Wallonne
10th Liège–Bastogne–Liège
2022
8th Overall Tour de Romandie
10th Liège–Bastogne–Liège
2023
2nd Overall Tour Down Under

1st Mountains classification

2nd Cadel Evans Great Ocean Road Race
2nd Trofeo Oro
3rd Road race, National Road Championships
3rd Overall Setmana Ciclista-Volta Comunitat Valenciana Fèmines
2024
1st Stage 1 (TTT) La Vuelta Femenina
4th Overall Tour Down Under
2025
1st Team relay, UCI Road World Championships
7th Overall Tour Down Under
2026
7th Tour Down Under
7th Overall Vuelta a Burgos Feminas

== See also ==
- 2014 Orica-AIS season
