= 2018 La Flèche Wallonne Femmes =

2018 UCI Women's World Tour, race 8 of 24
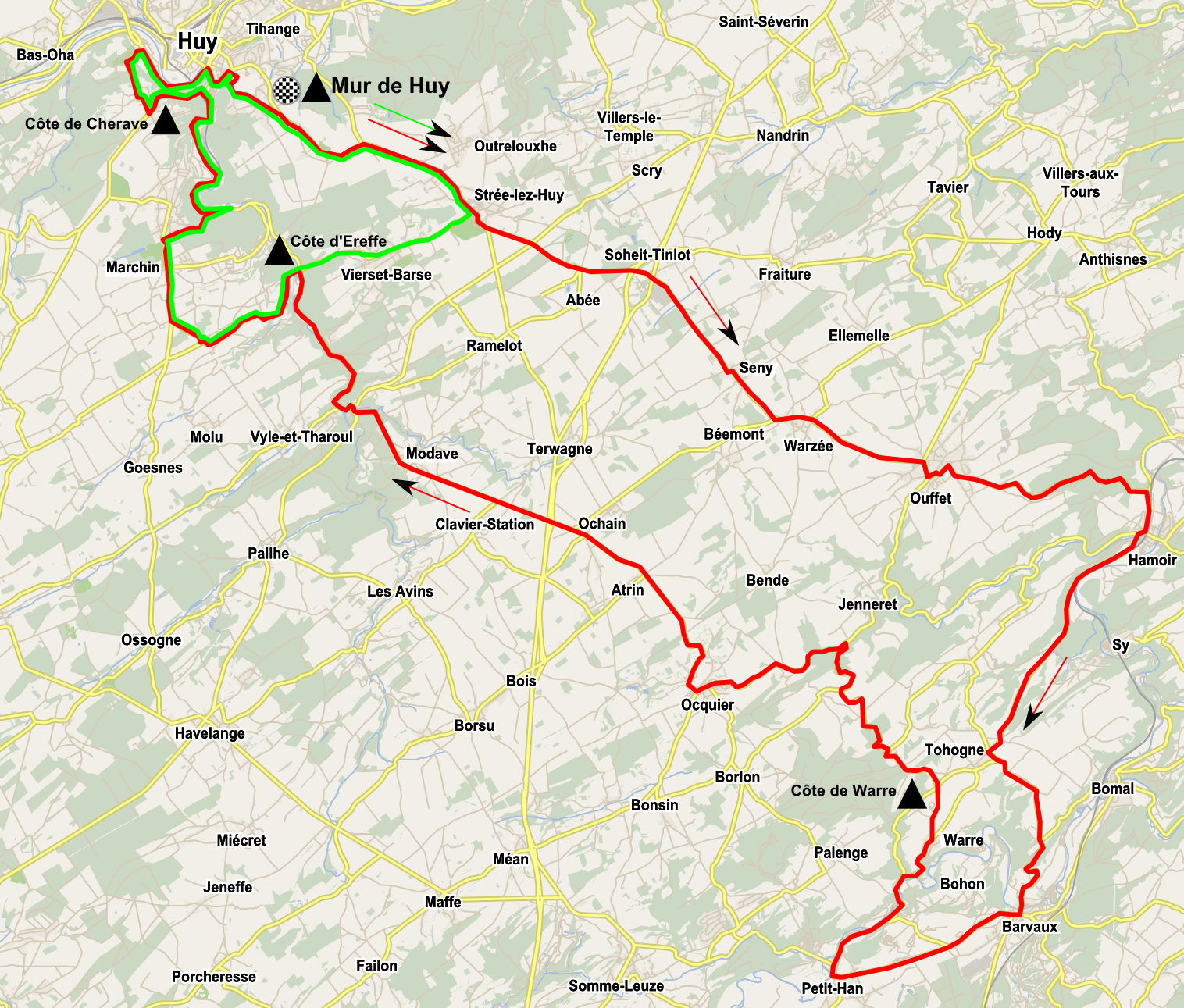

Race details
- Dates: 18 April 2018
- Stages: 1
- Distance: 118.5 km (73.6 mi)
- Winning time: 3h 10' 14"

Results
	Winner	Anna van der Breggen (NED)	(Boels–Dolmans)
	Second	Ashleigh Moolman (RSA)	(Cervélo–Bigla Pro Cycling)
	Third	Megan Guarnier (USA)	(Boels–Dolmans)

The 21st running of the women's Flèche wallonne was held on 18 April 2018. The race started and finished in Huy. The route featured seven categorized climbs, including two ascents of the Mur de Huy. The finish line was on the top of the final ascent of the Mur. Anna van der Breggen claimed her fourth Flèche Wallonne victory in a row.

== Route ==
The race started and finished in Huy. The final 30 km loop was covered twice, totaling 118.5 km.

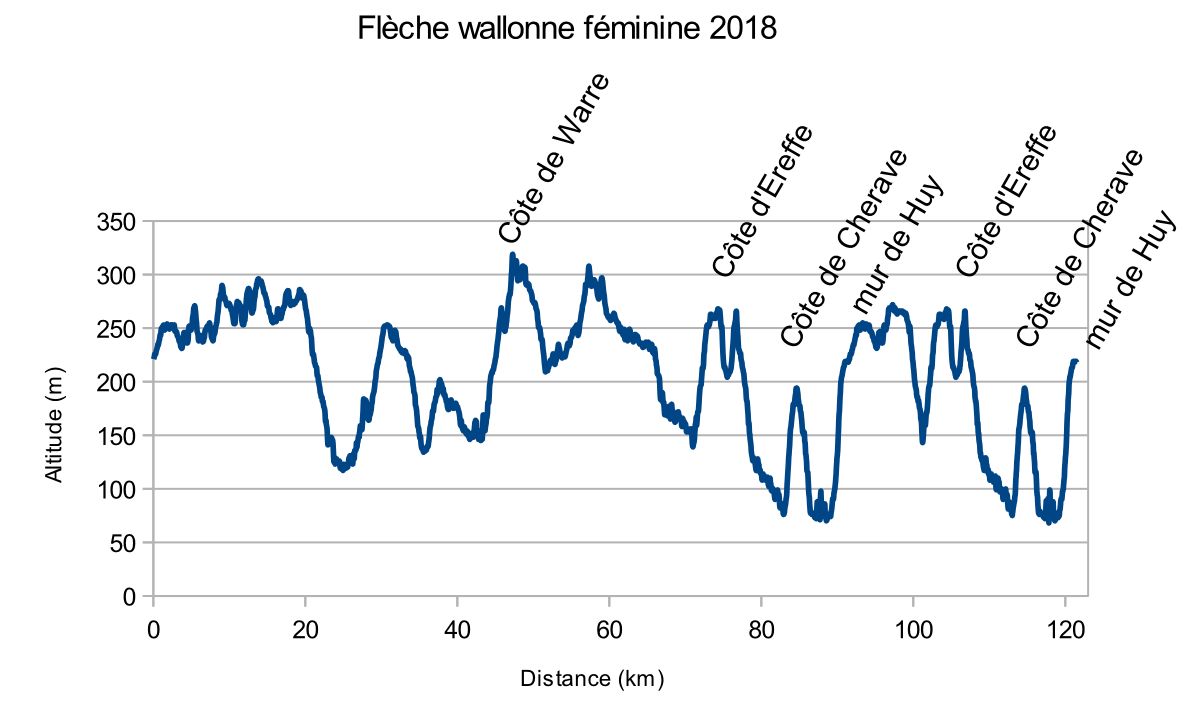
Race profile

There were 7 categorized climbs:

- 45.5 km: Côte de Warre – 2.2 km climb at 4.9%
- 73 km: Côte d'Ereffe – 2.1 km climb at 5%
- 83.5 km: Côte de Cherave – 1.3 km climb at 8.1%
- 89.5 km: Mur de Huy – 1.3 km climb at 9.6%
- 102 km: Côte d'Ereffe – 2.1 km climb at 5%
- 112.5 km: Côte de Cherave – 1.3 km climb at 8.1%
- 118.5 km: Mur de Huy – 1.3 km climb at 9.6%

== Teams ==
Twenty-three teams participated in the race. Each team had a maximum of six riders:

Professional women's teams

- Boels–Dolmans
- Canyon//SRAM
- Mitchelton–Scott
- FDJ Nouvelle-Aquitaine Futuroscope
- Cervélo–Bigla Pro Cycling
- Team Sunweb
- Alé–Cipollini
- Wiggle High5
- BTC City Ljubljana
- WaowDeals Pro Cycling
- Cylance Pro Cycling
- Team Virtu Cycling
- Hitec Products–Birk Sport
- Astana
- Bepink
- Trek–Drops
- Valcar–PBM
- Lotto–Soudal Ladies
- Movistar Team
- Tibco–Silicon Valley Bank
- Doltcini–Van Eyck Sport
- Experza–Footlogix
- Health Mate–Cyclelive Team

== Race summary ==
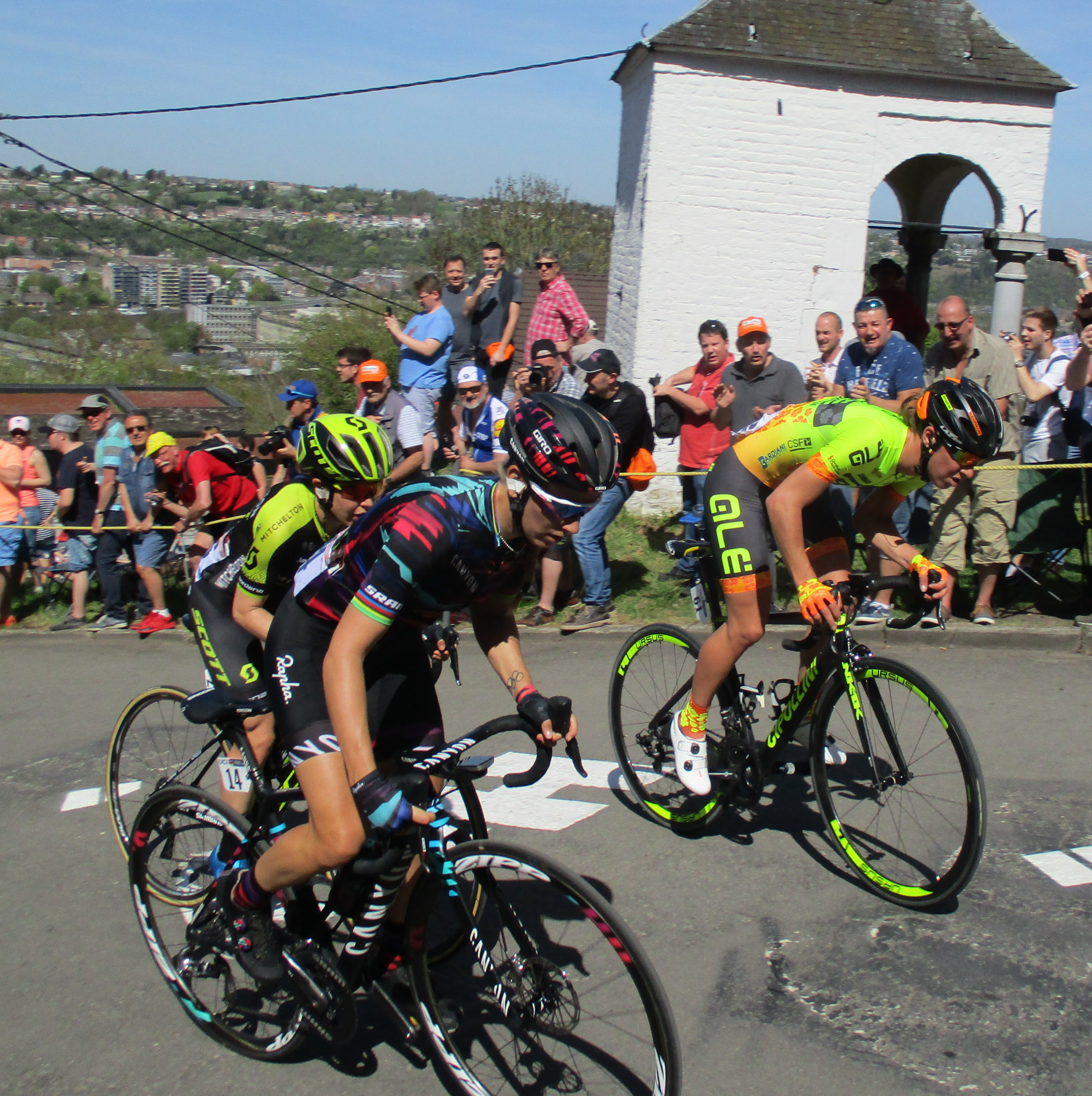
Ferrand-Pévot, Spratt and Ensing on the first ascent of the Mur de Huy

UCI Report

The race was run in exceptionally warm and sunny weather, with temperatures exceeding 20°C. On the first ascent of the Côte de Cherave, at 35 km from the finish, Pauline Ferrand-Prévot broke clear, immediately followed by Megan Guarnier, Amanda Spratt and Janneke Ensing. They crested the first ascent of the Mur de Huy in the lead. Spanish rider Mavi García tried to bridge the gap, but was caught again before the Côte de Cherave. The leading quartet's lead rose to 40 seconds at 20 km from the end, but the unrepresented teams led the chase in the peloton and narrowed the gap to ten seconds by the foot of the final Mur de Huy.

South African Ashleigh Moolman was the first to accelerate from the main group, under the one-kilometre banner, and bridged the gap to the four leaders. Guarnier managed to hang on, followed by Anna van der Breggen and Annemiek van Vleuten. Van der Breggen powered ahead in the last 200 m to take her fourth consecutive Flèche victory. Ashleigh Moolman finished second, Megan Guarnier third. It was van der Breggen's third World Tour win of 2018, which moved her into the overall lead of the World Tour classification.

== Results ==
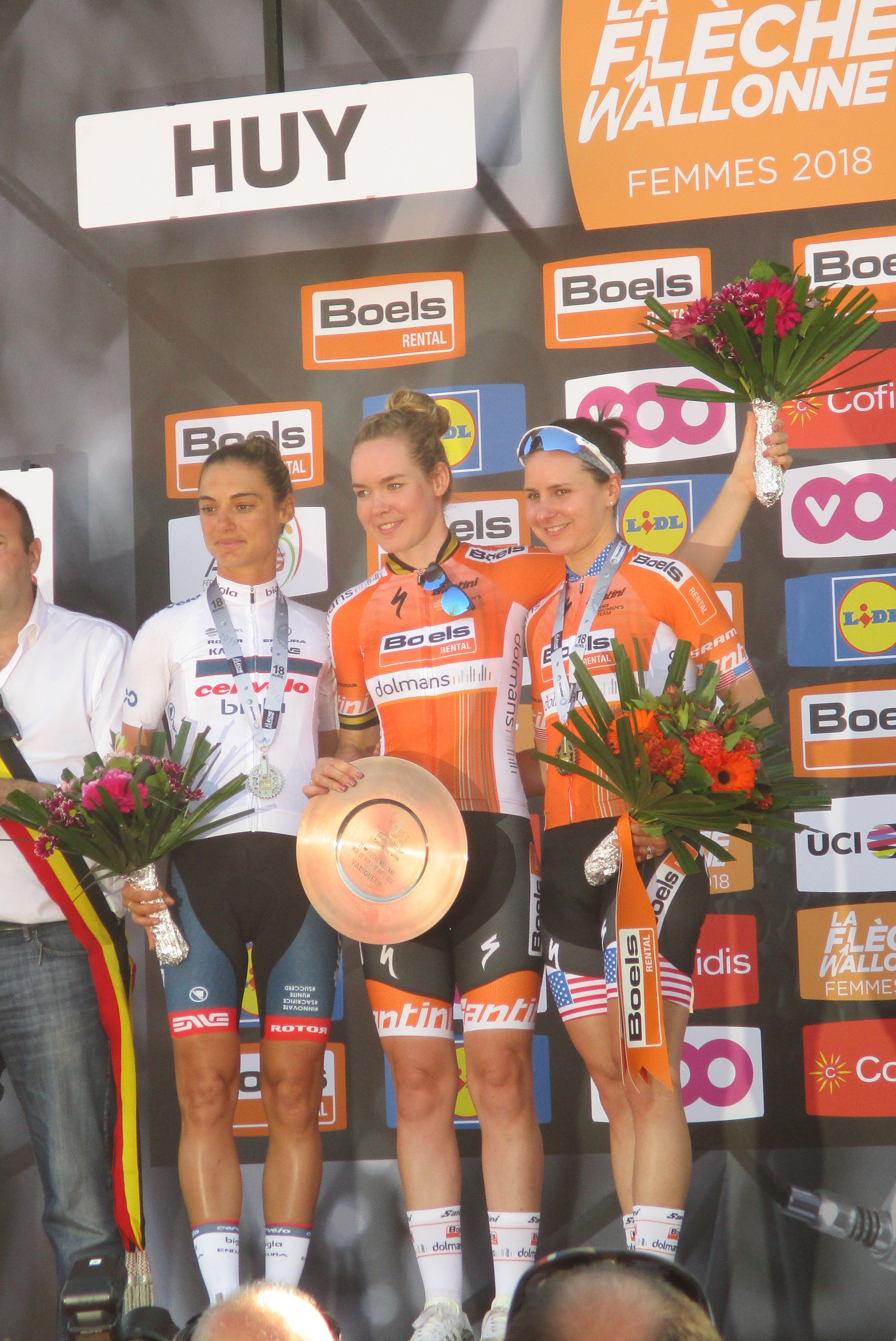
Podium of the 2018 edition.

Result
Rank	Rider	Team	Time
1	Anna van der Breggen (NED)	Boels–Dolmans	3h 10' 14"
2	Ashleigh Moolman (RSA)	Cervélo–Bigla Pro Cycling	+ 2"
3	Megan Guarnier (USA)	Boels–Dolmans	s.t.
4	Annemiek van Vleuten (NED)	Mitchelton–Scott	+ 6"
5	Amanda Spratt (AUS)	Mitchelton–Scott	+ 17"
6	Shara Gillow (AUS)	FDJ Nouvelle-Aquitaine Futuroscope	+ 19"
7	Sabrina Stultiens (NED)	WaowDeals Pro Cycling	+ 22"
8	Sofia Bertizzolo (ITA)	Astana	s.t.
9	Anastasiia Iakovenko (RUS)	BTC City Ljubljana	+ 25"
10	Margarita Victoria García (ESP)	Movistar Team	+ 28"

== UCI World Tour ==
=== Attributed points ===
Position	1st	2nd	3rd	4th	5th	6th	7th	8th	9th	10th	11th	12th	13th	14th	15th	16-30th	31-40th
World Tour points	200	150	125	100	85	70	60	50	40	35	30	25	20	15	10	5	3

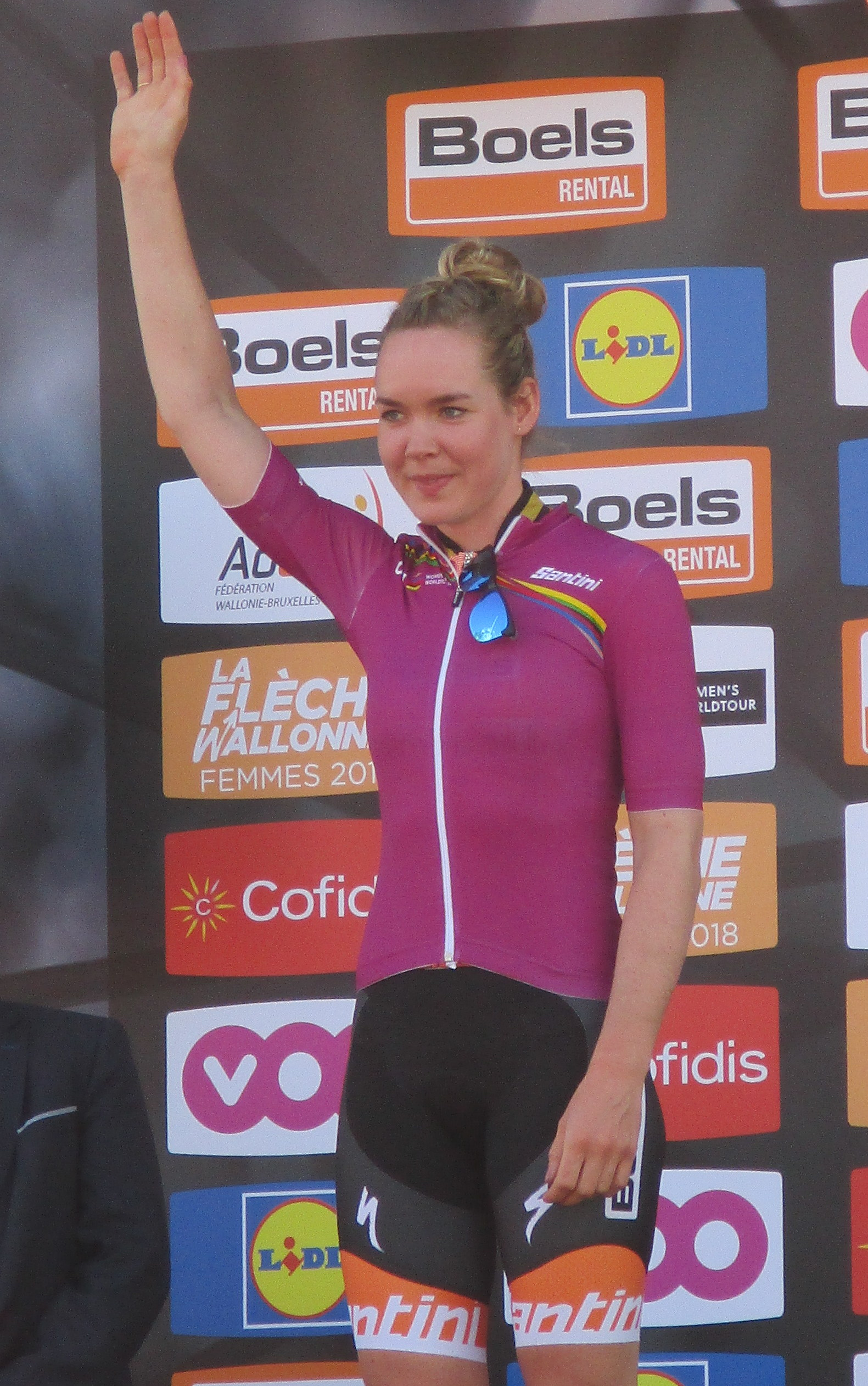
Anna van der Breggen became the new leader of the Women's World Tour.

=== Individual ranking after Flèche Wallonne ===
WorldTour points classification

Rank	Rider	Team	Points
1	Anna van der Breggen (NED)	Boels–Dolmans	608
2	Chantal Blaak (NED)	Boels–Dolmans	538
3	Amy Pieters (NED)	Boels–Dolmans	455
4	Jolien D'Hoore (BEL)	Mitchelton–Scott	405
5	Katarzyna Niewiadoma (POL)	Canyon//SRAM	400
6	Marta Bastianelli (ITA)	Alé–Cipollini	370
7	Amanda Spratt (AUS)	Mitchelton–Scott	370
8	Ashleigh Moolman (RSA)	Cervélo–Bigla Pro Cycling	365
9	Chloe Hosking (AUS)	Alé–Cipollini	280
10	Marianne Vos (NED)	WaowDeals Pro Cycling	273
