= Panorama Guizhou International Women's Road Cycling Race =

Race details
- Date: May
- Region: China
- Discipline: Road
- Competition: UCI 2.2 (2018)
- Type: Stage race

History
- First edition: 2018
- Editions: 1 (as of 2018)
- First winner: Sheyla Gutierrez (ESP)
- Most wins: No repeat winners
- Most recent: Sheyla Gutierrez (ESP)

The Panorama Guizhou International Women's Road Cycling Race was a professional road bicycle race for women in China held once in 2018.

== Winners ==
| Year | Country | Rider | Team |
|---|---|---|---|
| 2018 | Spain | Sheyla Gutierrez | Cylance Pro Cycling |
