= 2018 Ronde van Drenthe (women's race) =

2018 UCI Women's World Tour, race 2 of 24
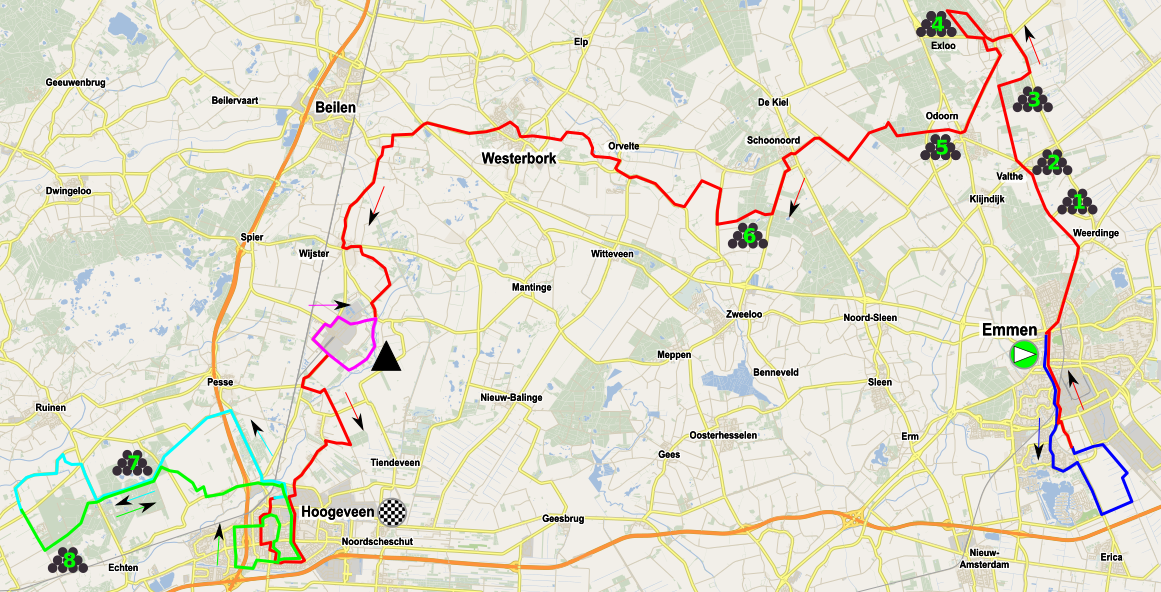

Race details
- Dates: 11 March 2018
- Stages: 1
- Distance: 157.2 km (97.7 mi)
- Winning time: 4h 06' 44"

Results
	Winner	Amy Pieters (NED)	(Boels–Dolmans)
	Second	Alexis Ryan (ITA)	(Canyon//SRAM)
	Third	Chloe Hosking (AUS)	(Alé–Cipollini)

UCI Report

The 12th running of the Ronde van Drenthe, a women's cycling race in the Netherlands, was held on 11 March 2018. Held over a distance of 157.2 kilometres (97.7 miles), starting and finishing in Hoogeveen. It was the second race of the 2018 UCI Women's World Tour. The race was won by Dutch rider Amy Pieters.

== Results ==
Final general classification

Rank	Rider	Team	Time
1	Amy Pieters (NED)	Boels–Dolmans	4h 06' 44"
2	Alexis Ryan (USA)	Canyon//SRAM	s.t.
3	Chloe Hosking (AUS)	Alé–Cipollini	+ 1"
4	Marta Bastianelli (ITA)	Alé–Cipollini	s.t.
5	Marianne Vos (NED)	WaowDeals Pro Cycling	s.t.
6	Coryn Rivera (USA)	Team Sunweb	s.t.
7	Arlenis Sierra (CUB)	Astana	s.t.
8	Roxane Fournier (FRA)	FDJ Nouvelle-Aquitaine Futuroscope	s.t.
9	Floortje Mackaij (NED)	Team Sunweb	s.t.
10	Ellen van Dijk (NED)	Team Sunweb	s.t.
