= 2018 Holland Ladies Tour =

2018 Boels Rental Ladies Tour
2018 UCI Women's World Tour, race 22 of 24
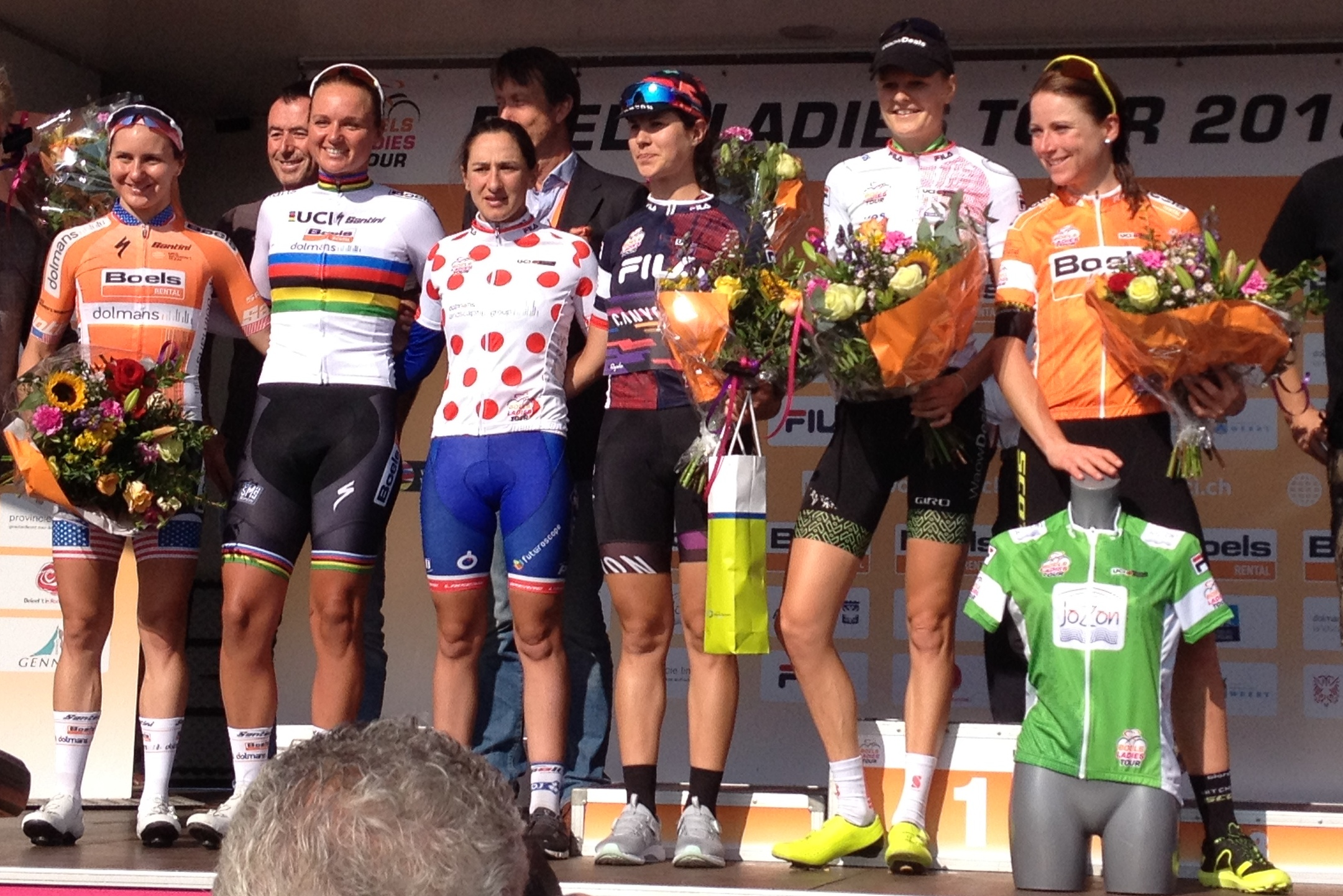
- Jersey winners in 2018

Race details
- Stages: 5 + Prologue

The 2018 Boels Rental Ladies Tour also known as the 2018 Holland Ladies Tour is the 21st edition of the Holland Ladies Tour, a women's cycle stage race held in the Netherlands. The tour is part of the 2018 women's road cycling calendar and is part of the UCI Women's World Tour.

== Stages ==
List of stages
Stage	Date	Course	Distance	Type	Winner
P	28 August	Arnhem to Arnhem	3.3 km (2.1 mi)	Prologue	Annemiek van Vleuten (NED)
1	29 August	Nijmegen to Nijmegen	132.2 km (82.1 mi)	Flat stage	Annemiek van Vleuten (NED)
2	30 August	Gennep to Gennep	129 km (80.2 mi)	Flat stage	Amalie Dideriksen (DEN)
3	31 August	Stramproy to Weert	124.3 km (77.2 mi)	Flat stage	Amalie Dideriksen (DEN)
4	1 September	Sittard to Sittard	158.4 km (98.4 mi)	Flat stage	Chantal Blaak (NED)
5	2 September	Roosendaal to Roosendaal	18.6 km (11.6 mi)	Time Trial	Annemiek van Vleuten (NED)
Total			570 km (354.2 mi)		

== Classification leadership ==
Stage	Winner	General classification	Points classification	Mountain classification	Sprint classification	Young rider classification	Combativity classification	Team classification
P	Annemiek van Vleuten	Annemiek van Vleuten	Annemiek van Vleuten	Annemiek van Vleuten	Annemiek van Vleuten	Lisa Klein	Lisa Brennauer	Team Sunweb
1	Annemiek van Vleuten	Annemiek van Vleuten	Annemiek van Vleuten	Annemiek van Vleuten	Amy Pieters	Jeanne Korevaar	Rosella Ratto	Team Sunweb
2	Amalie Dideriksen	Annemiek van Vleuten	Annemiek van Vleuten	Annemiek van Vleuten	Lucinda Brand	Jeanne Korevaar	Hannah Barnes	Team Sunweb
3	Amalie Dideriksen	Annemiek van Vleuten	Annemiek van Vleuten	Annemiek van Vleuten	Elena Cecchini	Jeanne Korevaar	Omer Shapira	Team Sunweb
4	Chantal Blaak	Annemiek van Vleuten	Annemiek van Vleuten	Eugénie Duval	Elena Cecchini	Jeanne Korevaar	Chantal Blaak	Boels–Dolmans
5	Annemiek van Vleuten	Annemiek van Vleuten	Annemiek van Vleuten	Eugénie Duval	Elena Cecchini	Jeanne Korevaar	Chantal Blaak	Boels–Dolmans
Final Classification		Annemiek van Vleuten	Annemiek van Vleuten	Eugénie Duval	Elena Cecchini	Jeanne Korevaar	Chantal Blaak	Boels–Dolmans

== See also ==
- 2018 in women's road cycling
