= Julie Meyer Solvang =

Norwegian cyclist

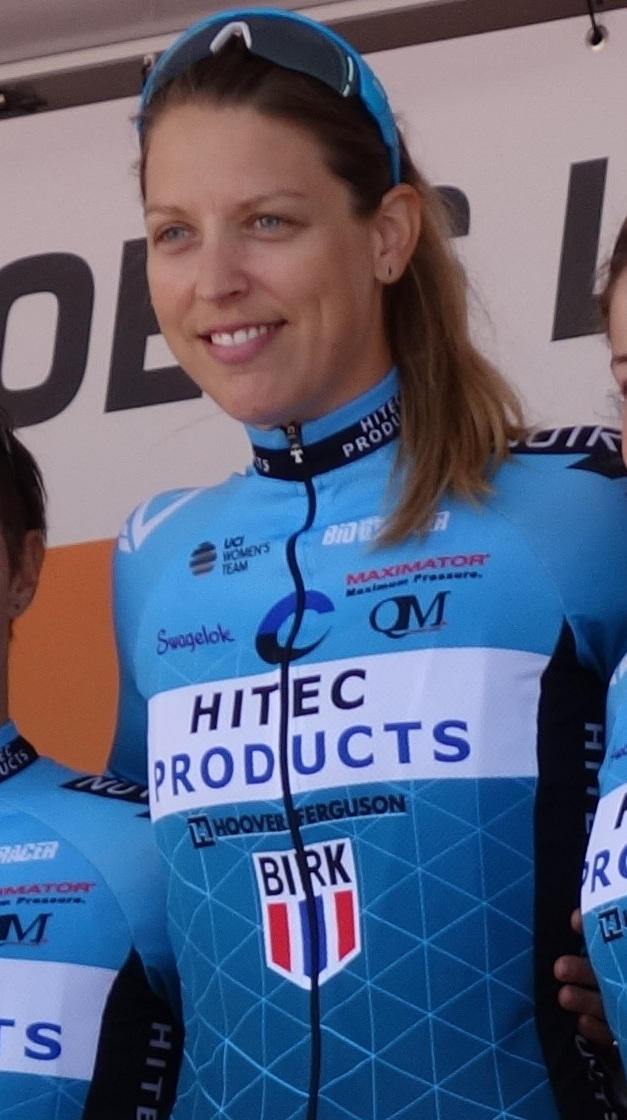
- Solvang at the 2019 Holland Ladies Tour

Personal information
- Full name: Julie Meyer Solvang
- Born: 3 September 1989 (age 37)

Cycling career
- Sport: Cycling
- Current team: Retired
- Discipline: Road
- Role: Rider

Amateur team
- 2017: Grimstad SK

Professional team
- 2018–2020: Hitec Products–Birk Sport

Julie Meyer Solvang (born 3 September 1989) is a Norwegian former professional racing cyclist, who rode professionally for Hitec Products–Birk Sport between 2018 and 2020.
