= Sheyla Gutiérrez =

Spanish cyclist

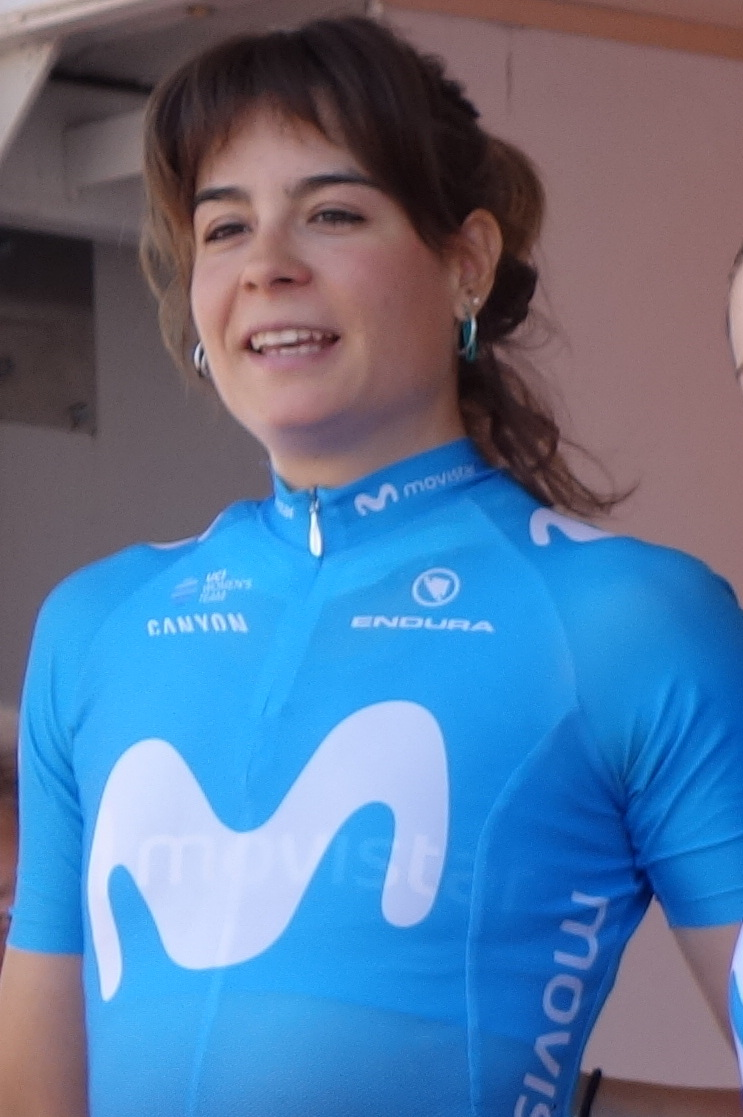
- Gutiérrez at the 2019 Holland Ladies Tour

Personal information
- Full name: Sheyla Gutíerrez Ruiz
- Born: 1 January 1994 (age 32) Varea, Spain

Cycling career
- Sport: Cycling
- Current team: Movistar Team
- Discipline: Road
- Role: Rider

Professional teams
- 2013–2015: Lointek
- 2016–2018: Cylance Pro Cycling
- 2019–: Movistar Team

Sheyla Gutiérrez Ruiz (born 1 January 1994) is a Spanish racing cyclist, who rides for UCI Women's WorldTeam Movistar Team. She rode at the 2014 UCI Road World Championships. In November 2015 she was announced as part of the inaugural squad for the Cylance Pro Cycling team for the 2016 season.

== Major results ==
2011
6th Road race, UCI Junior Road World Championships
2012
5th Iurreta
7th Road race, UCI Junior Road World Championships
7th Trofeo Roldan
2013
1st Zalla
2nd Sopelana
2nd Clasica de la Montaña Palentina
2nd Iurreta
2nd Balmaseda
3rd Tolosa
4th Villabona-Zizurkil
4th Ozaeta
National Road Championships

5th Road race
9th Time trial

5th Tafalla (Campeonato de Navarra)
6th Trofeo Gobierno de La Rioja
9th Gran Premio Txori-Erri
2014
1st Villarcayo
2nd Trofeu Fira d'Agost Xativa
2nd Trofeo Zamora
2nd Zalla
3rd Road race, National Road Championships
3rd Trofeo Gobierno de La Rioja
6th Tafalla
6th Sopelana
7th Grand Prix de Plumelec-Morbihan Dames
7th Balmaseda
2015
1st Grand Prix de Plumelec-Morbihan Dames
2nd Time trial, National Road Championships
2nd Iurreta
3rd Sopelana
3rd Trofeo Zamora
6th Omloop van het Hageland
6th La Classique Morbihan
6th Zalla
7th Acht van Chaam
7th Cholet Pays de Loire Dames
9th Time trial, UEC European Under-23 Road Championships
10th Overall Tour de Feminin-O cenu Českého Švýcarska
10th La Madrid Challenge by La Vuelta
2016
National Road Championships

3rd Road race
4th Time trial

4th Grand Prix de Dottignies
8th Road race, UCI Road World Championships
2017
National Road Championships

1st Road race
3rd Time trial

1st Le Samyn des Dames
1st Stage 7 Giro d'Italia Femminile
3rd Trofeo Gobierno de La Rioja
5th Madrid Challenge by La Vuelta
6th Gran Premio Bruno Beghelli Internazionale Donne Elite
6th GP de Plouay – Bretagne
7th Women's Tour de Yorkshire
7th Grand Prix de Dottignies
8th Omloop Het Nieuwsblad
9th Giro dell'Emilia Internazionale Donne Elite
9th Drentse Acht van Westerveld
10th Pajot Hills Classic
10th Gent–Wevelgem
2018
1st Overall Tour of Zhoushan Island

1st Points classification

1st Overall Panorama Guizhou International Women's Road Cycling Race

1st Stage 1

6th Le Samyn des Dames
7th Driedaagse Brugge–De Panne
2019
1st Time trial, National Road Championships
3rd Grand Prix de Plumelec-Morbihan Dames
5th Dwars door Vlaanderen for Women
7th Gran Premio Bruno Beghelli Internazionale Donne Elite
2020
1st La Périgord Ladies
3rd Time trial, National Road Championships
6th Clasica Femenina Navarra
2022
Tour Cycliste Féminin International de l'Ardèche

1st Stages 1 & 2

2nd Time trial, National Road Championships
7th Kreiz Breizh Elites Dames
