= Jeanne Korevaar =

Dutch bicycle racer

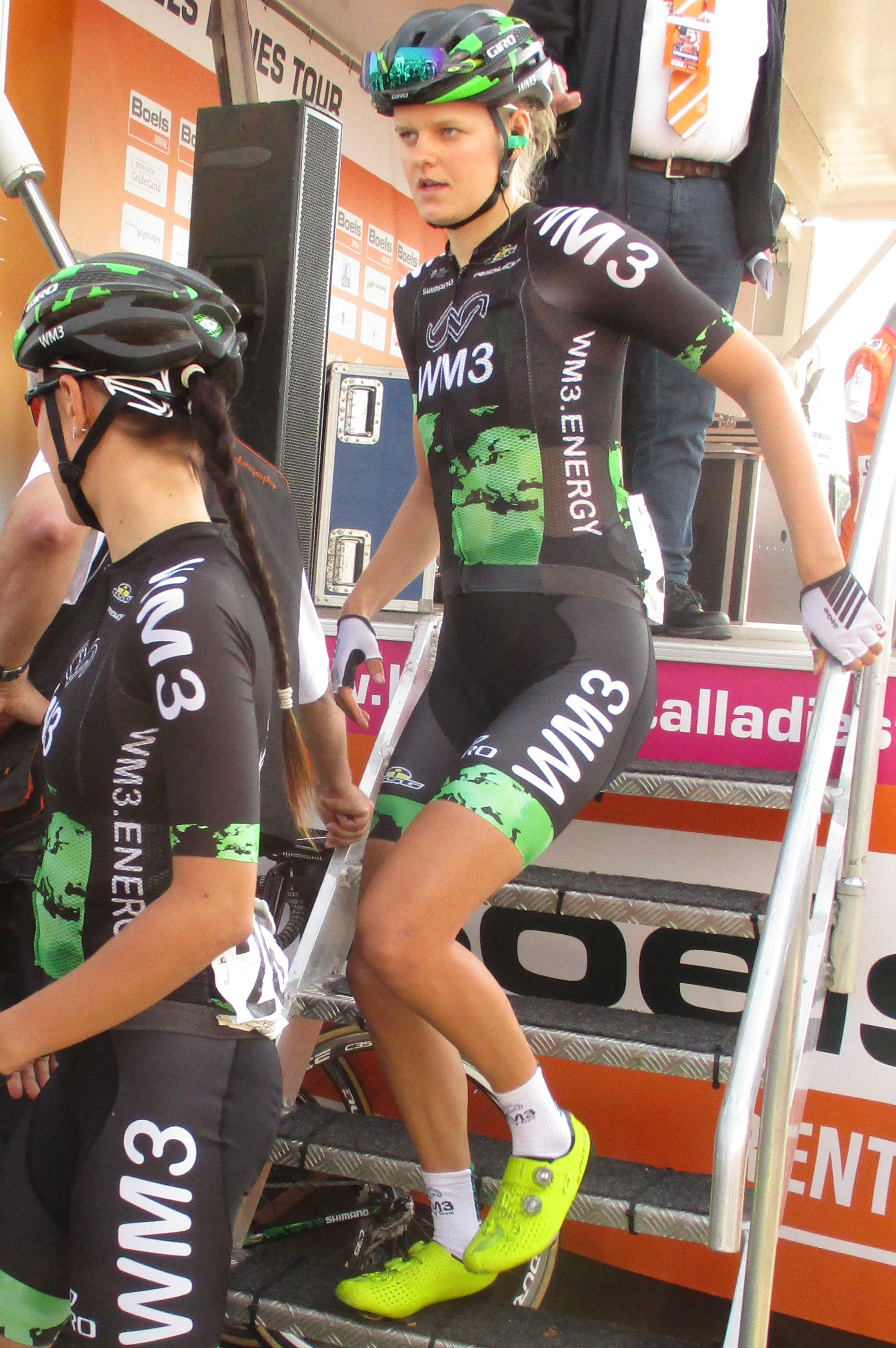
- Korevaar in 2017

Personal information
- Full name: Jeanne Korevaar
- Born: 24 September 1996 (age 30) Groot-Ammers, Netherlands
- Height: 1.78 m (5 ft 10 in)
- Weight: 59 kg (130 lb)

Cycling career
- Sport: Cycling
- Current team: Liv AlUla Jayco
- Discipline: Road
- Role: Rider

Professional teams
- 2015–2023: Liv Racing TeqFind
- 2024–: Liv AlUla Jayco

Jeanne Korevaar (born 24 September 1996) is a Dutch professional racing cyclist, who currently rides for UCI Women's WorldTeam Liv AlUla Jayco. She is the younger sister of the cyclist Merijn Korevaar.

== Major results ==
2013
5th Time trial, National Junior Road Championships
5th Overall Energiewacht Tour
10th Road race, UCI Junior Road World Championships
2014
National Junior Road Championships

3rd Time trial
4th Road race

7th Road race, UCI Junior Road World Championships
2016
1st Stage 2a (TTT) Giro del Trentino Alto Adige-Südtirol
2017
9th Dwars door de Westhoek
10th Drentse Acht van Westerveld
2018
1st Stage 2 Belgium Tour
1st Young rider classification, Women's Herald Sun Tour
1st Young rider classification, Boels Ladies Tour
6th Overall Tour Cycliste Féminin International de l'Ardèche
7th Omloop Het Nieuwsblad
8th Drentse Acht van Westerveld
8th Three Days of Bruges–De Panne
9th Overall Festival Elsy Jacobs
2019
6th Omloop Het Nieuwsblad
2021
6th Overall Tour Cycliste Féminin International de l'Ardèche
10th Overall Simac Ladies Tour
2022
7th Binche Chimay Binche pour Dames
