= Cylance Pro Cycling (women's team) =

United States women's cycling team

Team information
- UCI code: CPC
- Registered: United States
- Founded: 2016
- Disbanded: 2018
- Discipline: Road
- Status: UCI Women's Team

Key personnel
- General manager: Manel Lacambra

Team name history
- 2016–2018: Cylance Pro Cycling
Cylance Pro Cycling jersey
Jersey

Cylance Pro Cycling was a professional women's cycling team based in the United States of America that started competing in elite women's road bicycle racing events, such as the UCI Women's World Tour, in 2016. The team's major sponsor, Cylance, was a high-tech computer security firm, and the team was owned by Inspire Sports whose founder, Omer Kem, previously managed BMW p/b Happy Tooth Dental and Bissell Pro Cycling. The team disbanded at the end of the 2018 season.

== Team history ==
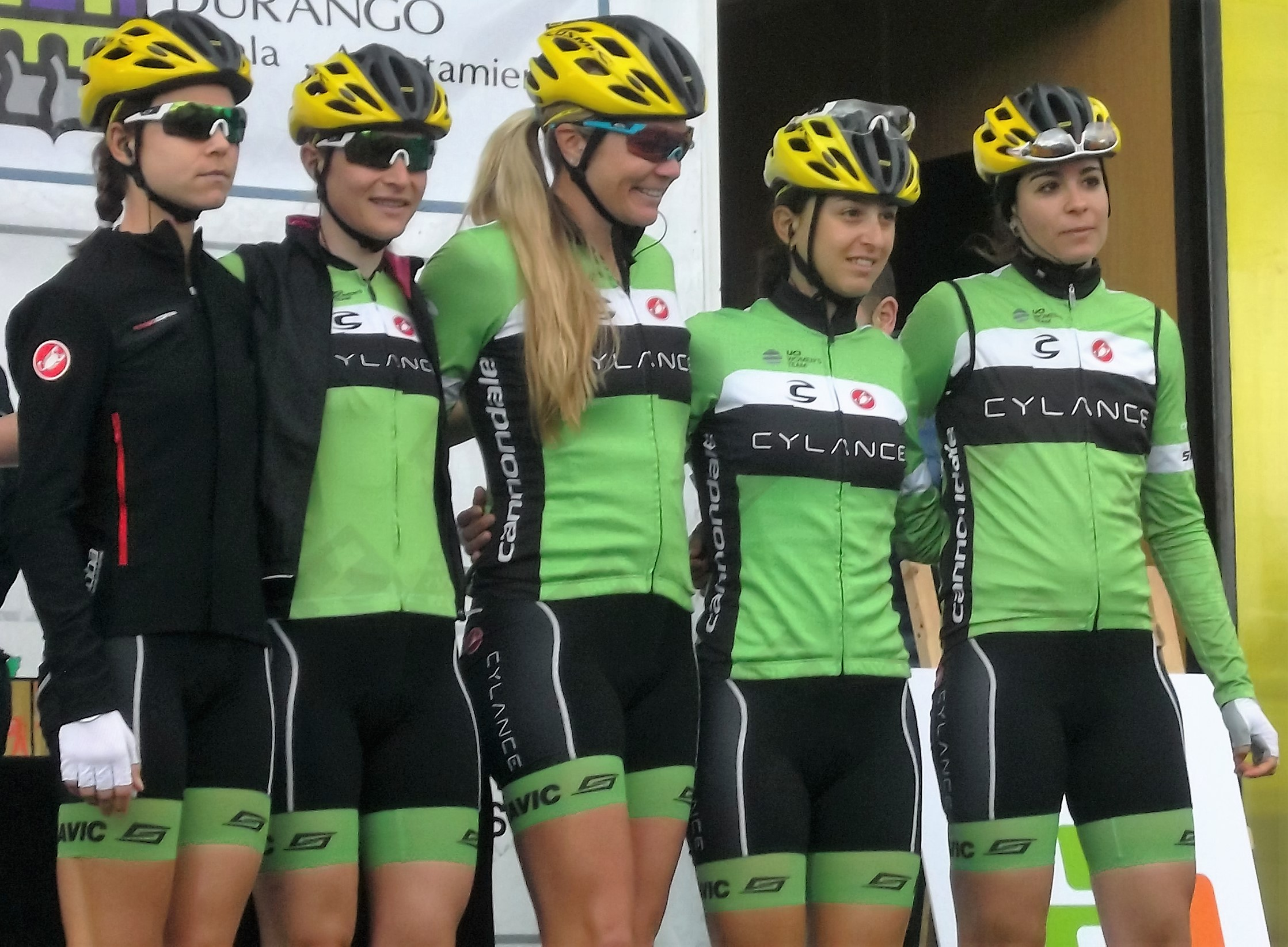
The Cylance team at the 2016 Emakumeen Euskal Bira

In preparation for their first season, the team signed Shelley Olds, Rossella Ratto, and Valentina Scandolara as headline riders. The team also signed Krista Doebel-Hickok, Alison Tetrick, Erica Zaveta, Sheyla Gutiérrez, Doris Schweizer, and Kathryn Bertine.

== Team roster ==
Rider	Date of birth
Holly Breck (USA)	May 27, 1992 (age 34)
Giorgia Bronzini (ITA)	August 3, 1983 (age 43)
Kristabel Doebel-Hickok (USA)	April 28, 1989 (age 37)
Jelena Erić (SER)	15 January 1996 (age 30)
Sheyla Gutiérrez (ESP)	January 1, 1994 (age 32)
Kaitie Keough (USA)	January 1, 1992 (age 34)

Rider	Date of birth
Rossella Ratto (ITA)	October 20, 1993 (age 32)
Omer Shapira (ISR)	September 9, 1994 (age 31)
Lauren Stephens (USA)	28 December 1986 (age 39)
Marta Tagliaferro (ITA)	November 4, 1989 (age 36)
Marcella Toldi (BRA)	May 3, 1984 (age 42)

== Major wins ==
2016
Winston Salem Cycling Classic, Rossella Ratto

2017
Stages 2 & 4 Santos Women's Tour, Kirsten Wild
Stage 7 Giro d'Italia Femminile, Sheyla Gutiérrez
Stage 2 Holland Ladies Tour Kirsten Wild
Rochester Cyclo-cross, Kaitlin Antonneau
Iowa City Cyclo-cross, Kaitlin Antonneau
Thompson Cyclo-cross, Kaitlin Antonneau
Baltimore I Cyclo-cross, Kaitlin Antonneau
Baltimore II Cyclo-cross, Kaitlin Antonneau
Covington Cyclo-cross, Kaitlin Antonneau

2018
Points classification Tour of Chongming Island, Giorgia Bronzini

Stage 1, Giorgia Bronzini

Overall Tour of Zhoushan Island, Sheyla Gutiérrez

Points classification, Sheyla Gutiérrez

Overall Panorama Guizhou International Women's Road Cycling Race, Sheyla Gutiérrez

Stage 1, Sheyla Gutiérrez

Stage 2 Madrid Challenge by la Vuelta, Giorgia Bronzini

== National, continental and world champions ==
2016
Switzerland Time Trial, Doris Schweizer
Switzerland Road Race, Doris Schweizer
European U23 Track (Scratch race), Rachele Barbieri
2017
World Track Championships (Scratch race), Rachele Barbieri
Spain Road Race, Sheyla Gutiérrez
European Track (Elimination race), Kirsten Wild
Netherlands Track Championships (Madison), Kirsten Wild
Netherlands Track Championships (Omnium), Kirsten Wild
Netherlands Track Championships (Scratch race), Kirsten Wild
2018
Serbia Time Trial, Jelena Erić
Serbia Road Race, Jelena Erić
Israel Road Race, Omer Shapira
