= 2017 Ladies Tour of Norway =

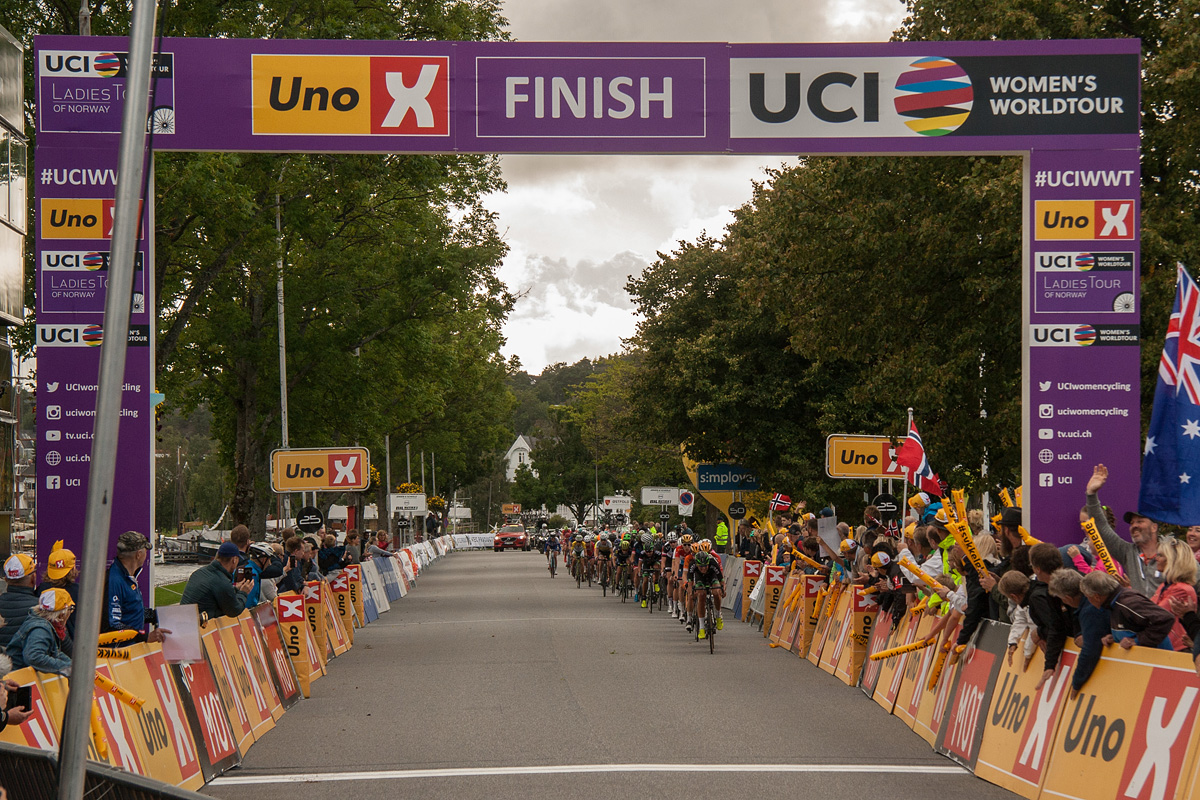
- Ladies Tour of Norway 2017 – stage 2 – last passing of finish line

Race details
- Dates: 17–20 August 2017
- Stages: Prologue & 3 stages

The 2017 Ladies Tour of Norway is the fifth edition of the Ladies Tour of Norway, a women's cycling stage race in Norway and part of the 2017 UCI Women's World Tour.

== Stages ==
=== Prologue ===
17 August 2017 – Halden to Halden, 3.1 km (1.9 mi)

Prologue result & General classification

	Rider	Team	Time
1	Ellen van Dijk (NED)	Team Sunweb	3' 44"
2	Marianne Vos (NED)	WM3 Energie	+ 1"
3	Katrin Garfoot (AUS)	Orica–Scott	+ 1"
4	Lisa Klein (GER)	Cervélo–Bigla Pro Cycling	+ 1"
5	Megan Guarnier (USA)	Boels–Dolmans	+ 4"
6	Juliette Labous (FRA)	Team Sunweb	+ 4"
7	Mieke Kröger (GER)	Canyon//SRAM	+ 4"
8	Jolien D'Hoore (BEL)	Wiggle High5	+ 5"
9	Lotta Lepistö (FIN)	Cervélo–Bigla Pro Cycling	+ 5"
10	Katie Archibald (GBR)	Team WNT	+ 6"

=== Stage 1 ===
18 August 2017 – Halden to Mysen, 101.5 km (63.1 mi)

Stage 1 result

	Rider	Team	Time
1	Jolien D'Hoore (BEL)	Wiggle High5	2h 26' 39"
2	Gracie Elvin (AUS)	Orica–Scott	+ 0"
3	Christine Majerus (LUX)	Boels–Dolmans	+ 0"
4	Elisa Balsamo (ITA)	Valcar–PBM	+ 0"
5	Marianne Vos (NED)	WM3 Energie	+ 0"
6	Chloe Hosking (AUS)	Alé–Cipollini	+ 0"
7	Kirsten Wild (NED)	Cylance Pro Cycling	+ 0"
8	Katarzyna Niewiadoma (POL)	WM3 Energie	+ 0"
9	Emilie Moberg (NOR)	Team Hitec Products	+ 0"
10	Giorgia Bronzini (ITA)	Wiggle High5	+ 0"

General classification after stage 1

	Rider	Team	Time
1	Jolien D'Hoore (BEL)	Wiggle High5	2h 30' 17"
2	Marianne Vos (NED)	WM3 Energie	+ 2"
3	Ellen Van Dijk (NED)	Team Sunweb	+ 6"
4	Katrin Garfoot (AUS)	Orica–Scott	+ 7"
5	Lisa Klein (GER)	Cervélo–Bigla Pro Cycling	+ 7"
6	Megan Guarnier (USA)	Boels–Dolmans	+ 8"
7	Mieke Kröger (GER)	Canyon//SRAM	+ 9"
8	Christine Majerus (LUX)	Boels–Dolmans	+ 10"
9	Juliette Labous (FRA)	Team Sunweb	+ 10"
10	Lotta Lepistö (FIN)	Cervélo–Bigla Pro Cycling	+ 11"

=== Stage 2 ===
19 August 2017 – Sarpsborg to Fredrikstad, 140.4 km (87.2 mi)

Stage 2 result

	Rider	Team	Time
1	Chloe Hosking (AUS)	Alé–Cipollini	3h 34' 26"
2	Marianne Vos (NED)	WM3 Energie	+ 0"
3	Ellen Van Dijk (NED)	Team Sunweb	+ 0"
4	Jolien D'Hoore (BEL)	Wiggle High5	+ 0"
5	Lotta Lepistö (FIN)	Cervélo–Bigla Pro Cycling	+ 0"
6	Roxane Fournier (FRA)	FDJ Nouvelle-Aquitaine Futuroscope	+ 0"
7	Floortje Mackaij (NED)	Team Sunweb	+ 0"
8	Tiffany Cromwell (AUS)	Canyon//SRAM	+ 0"
9	Claudia Koster (NED)	Team VéloCONCEPT	+ 0"
10	Alexis Ryan (USA)	Canyon//SRAM	+ 0"

General classification after stage 2

	Rider	Team	Time
1	Marianne Vos (NED)	WM3 Energie	6h 04' 31"
2	Jolien D'Hoore (BEL)	Wiggle High5	+ 12"
3	Ellen Van Dijk (NED)	Team Sunweb	+ 12"
4	Megan Guarnier (USA)	Boels–Dolmans	+ 17"
5	Katrin Garfoot (AUS)	Orica–Scott	+ 19"
6	Lisa Klein (GER)	Cervélo–Bigla Pro Cycling	+ 19"
7	Chloe Hosking (AUS)	Alé–Cipollini	+ 20"
8	Christine Majerus (LUX)	Boels–Dolmans	+ 21"
9	Lotta Lepistö (FIN)	Cervélo–Bigla Pro Cycling	+ 21"
10	Juliette Labous (FRA)	Team Sunweb	+ 22"

=== Stage 3 ===
20 August 2017 – Svinesund to Halden, 156.6 km (97.3 mi)

Stage 3 result

	Rider	Team	Time
1	Megan Guarnier (USA)	Boels–Dolmans	4h 05' 55"
2	Ellen Van Dijk (NED)	Team Sunweb	+ 0"
3	Marianne Vos (NED)	WM3 Energie	+ 0"
4	Lotta Lepistö (FIN)	Cervélo–Bigla Pro Cycling	+ 0"
5	Floortje Mackaij (NED)	Team Sunweb	+ 0"
6	Gracie Elvin (AUS)	Orica–Scott	+ 0"
7	Giorgia Bronzini (ITA)	Wiggle High5	+ 0"
8	Christine Majerus (LUX)	Boels–Dolmans	+ 0"
9	Tiffany Cromwell (AUS)	Canyon//SRAM	+ 0"
10	Demi de Jong (NED)	Parkhotel Valkenburg–Destil	+ 0"

General classification after stage 3

	Rider	Team	Time
1	Marianne Vos (NED)	WM3 Energie	10h 10' 19"
2	Megan Guarnier (USA)	Boels–Dolmans	+ 13"
3	Ellen Van Dijk (NED)	Team Sunweb	+ 13"
4	Katrin Garfoot (AUS)	Orica–Scott	+ 26"
5	Lisa Klein (GER)	Cervélo–Bigla Pro Cycling	+ 26"
6	Chloe Hosking (AUS)	Alé–Cipollini	+ 27"
7	Christine Majerus (LUX)	Boels–Dolmans	+ 28"
8	Lotta Lepistö (FIN)	Cervélo–Bigla Pro Cycling	+ 28"
9	Juliette Labous (FRA)	Team Sunweb	+ 29"
10	Alexis Ryan (USA)	Canyon//SRAM	+ 30"

== Classification progress ==
Stage	Winner	General classification	Points classification	Mountains classification	Sprints classification	Youth classification	Norwegian rider classification	Team classification
P	Ellen van Dijk	Ellen van Dijk	Marianne Vos	Katrin Garfoot	Daiva Tušlaitė	Lisa Klein	Vita Heine	Team Sunweb
1	Jolien D'Hoore	Jolien D'Hoore	Marianne Vos	Rosella Ratto	Daiva Tušlaitė	Lisa Klein	Susanne Andersen	Team Sunweb
2	Chloe Hosking	Marianne Vos	Marianne Vos	Janneke Ensing	Daiva Tušlaitė	Lisa Klein	Susanne Andersen	Team Sunweb
3	Megan Guarnier	Marianne Vos	Marianne Vos	Janneke Ensing	Daiva Tušlaitė	Lisa Klein	Susanne Andersen	Team Sunweb
Final		Marianne Vos	Marianne Vos	Janneke Ensing	Daiva Tušlaitė	Lisa Klein	Susanne Andersen	Team Sunweb
