= 2018 Women's Tour de Yorkshire =

4th women's Tour de Yorkshire

Race details
- Dates: 3–4 May 2018
- Stages: 2
- Distance: 260.5 km (161.9 mi)

Results
Jersey awarded to the overall winner	Winner	Megan Guarnier (USA)	(Boels–Dolmans)
	Second	Danielle Rowe (GBR)	(WaowDeals Pro Cycling)
	Third	Alena Amialiusik (BLR)	(Boels–Dolmans)
Jersey awarded to the points classification winner	Points	Kirsten Wild (NED)	(Boels–Dolmans)
Jersey awarded to the mountains classification winner	Mountains	Megan Guarnier (USA)	(Boels–Dolmans)

The 2018 Women's Tour de Yorkshire was a two-day cycling stage race staged in Yorkshire over 3 and 4 May 2018. It is the third edition of the Women's Tour de Yorkshire, organised by Welcome to Yorkshire and the Amaury Sport Organisation - but the first multi-day stage race.

== Route ==
Stage characteristics and winners
Stage	Date	Start	Finish	Length	Type	Winner
1	3 May	Beverley	Doncaster	132.5 km (82.3 miles)	Flat stage	Kirsten Wild (NED)
2	4 May	Barnsley	Ilkley	128 km (79.5 miles)	Hilly stage	Megan Guarnier (USA)

== Classification leadership table ==
Stage	Winner	General classification	Points classification	Mountains classification	Combativity prize	Teams classification
1	Kirsten Wild	Kirsten Wild	Kirsten Wild	Pfeiffer Georgi	Anna Christian	Parkhotel Valkenburg
2	Megan Guarnier	Megan Guarnier	Kirsten Wild	Megan Guarnier	Danielle King	Team Sunweb
Final		Megan Guarnier	Kirsten Wild	Megan Guarnier	Not Awarded	Team Sunweb
