= Tiffany Cromwell =

Australian cyclist

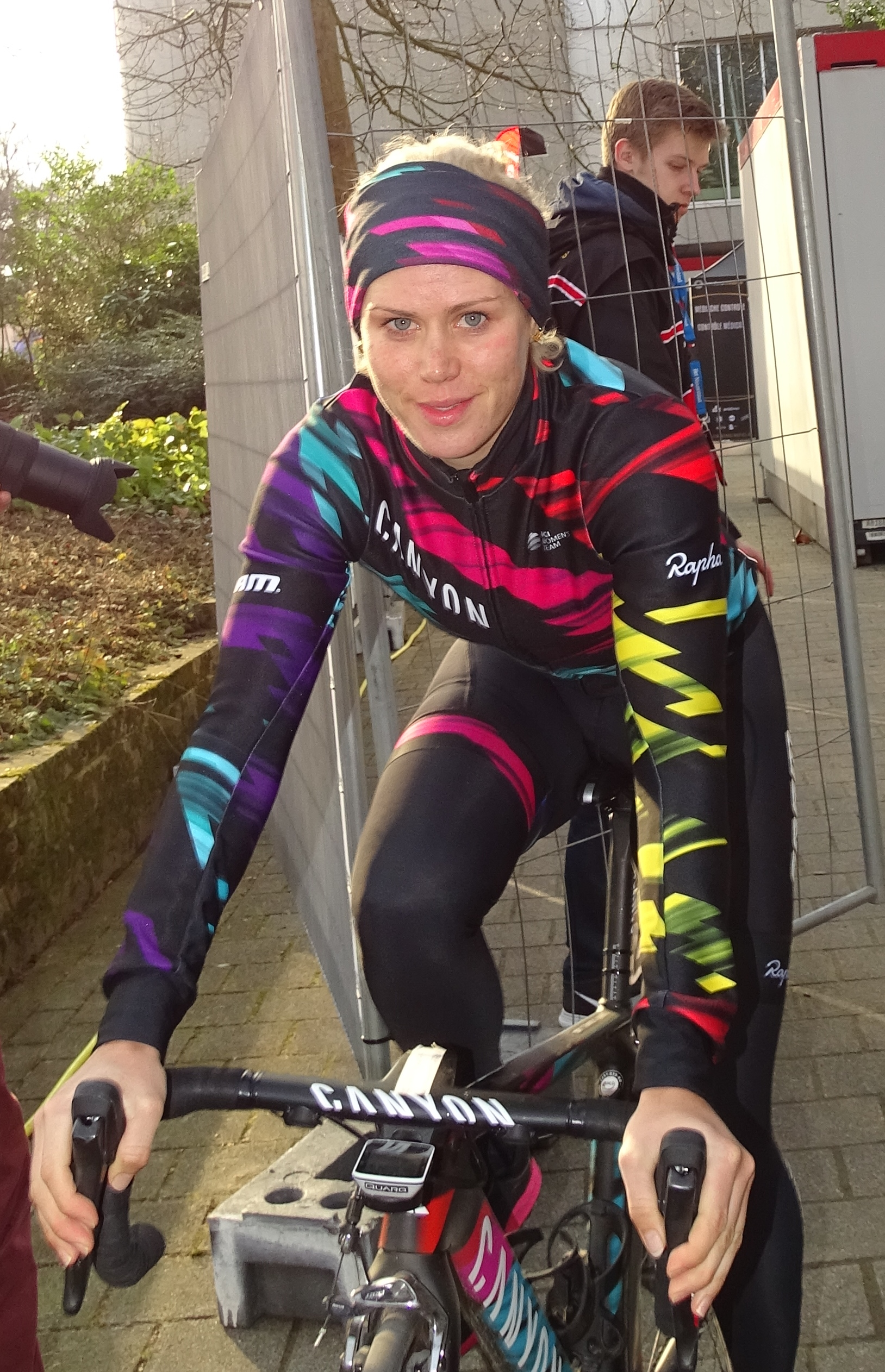
- Cromwell at the 2016 Omloop Het Nieuwsblad

Personal information
- Full name: Tiffany Jane Cromwell
- Born: 6 July 1988 (age 38) Stirling, South Australia
- Height: 166 cm (5 ft 5 in)
- Weight: 50 kg (110 lb)

Cycling career
- Sport: Cycling
- Current team: Canyon//SRAM
- Disciplines: Road; Gravel
- Role: Rider

Amateur team
- 2007–2009: Colavita–Sutter Home

Professional teams
- 2010–2011: Lotto Ladies Team
- 2011: Hitec Products UCK
- 2012–2013: Orica–AIS
- 2014–2015: Specialized–lululemon
- 2016–: Canyon//SRAM

Tiffany Jane Cromwell (born 6 July 1988) is an Australian road and gravel cyclist, who currently rides for UCI Women's WorldTeam Canyon//SRAM.

== Career ==
=== Road ===
==== Junior career ====
Starting in 2002, after being identified by the South Australian sports institute talent identification program, Cromwell began her cycling career. Cycling was not the first sport Cromwell picked up, having done ballet, running, triathlons and basketball beforehand, the last of which she had family ties to. Despite an interest in pursuing basketball as a career before cycling, Cromwell admits her height 'always let [her] down'. Initially, Cromwell disliked cycling, citing that she was 'Tiny and one of the worst in [her] group' on the track, but soon discovered her love for the sport when she placed third in her first road race in the state championships.

After several podiums in junior Oceania games, one of Cromwell's first international wins came in 2008 at the Sea Otter Classic in California, having made a solo attack in the last few laps despite a 30 miles per hour (48 km/h) wind. She then went on to win the race the following year by winning solo again.

==== Senior career ====
Cromwell joined her first European based team in 2010 with the Lotto Ladies Team after a contract with another team fell through. Due to communication issues, both team and rider decided to part ways in the middle of 2011. Cromwell then rode for the Hitec Products UCK team until the end of the season.

In 2012 Cromwell joined the Australian team Orica–AIS. Here, she picked up some of her major wins. One of which was a win in stage 5 of the Giro d'Italia Femminile. In the stage, Cromwell attacked with over 100 kilometres (62 miles) to go and ended the stage with an eight-and-a-half minute advantage over the competition and at one point was virtually in the race leader's jersey. With Orica–AIS, Cromwell also picked up her first major one day event win at the 2013 Omloop Het Nieuwsblad, with Cromwell winning in a sprint against Megan Guarnier to claim her first spring classics victory.

For 2014, Cromwell joined Specialized–lululemon. She recorded several stage podiums in the 2014 Tour Cycliste Féminin International de l'Ardèche and finished second in the mountains classification. Cromwell represented Australia at the Commonwealth Games, losing out on a bronze medal in the road race in a two-up sprint with South Africa's Ashleigh Moolman. The following year, she finished third in stage 1 of the Giro d'Italia Femminile.

After Velocio–SRAM folded at the end of the 2015 season, Cromwell joined Canyon//SRAM for the 2016 season; Cromwell finished third at Omloop Het Nieuwsblad, and won stage four of the Giro d'Italia Femminile. The following year, she won stage one of the Thüringen Rundfahrt der Frauen. In 2018, Cromwell was again selected to represent Australia at the Commonwealth Games, where, as road captain, she was part of the team that supported Chloe Hosking to the gold medal.

On 19 May 2021, it was announced that Cromwell was included within the Australian road cycling team for the delayed Tokyo Olympics, marking her Olympic debut. In a tough and humid road course, Cromwell finished as the best placed Australian in 26th place, almost three minutes behind race winner Anna Kiesenhofer of Austria. On 27 October 2021, it was announced Cromwell would remain as part of the Canyon-SRAM team for a further two years, continuing her mixed program of road and gravel racing through until the end of 2023.

=== Gravel ===
Cromwell's first participation in a gravel event was in August 2019 where she, along with Canyon//SRAM teammate Ella Harris, lined up in the Steamboat Springs gravel event (SBT GRVL) in Colorado, four days before the Colorado classic road cycling tour. Cromwell completed the blue course in second behind Harris with a time of five hours and six minutes.

In 2020, when Cromwell renewed her contract with Canyon//SRAM, it was announced she would be competing in a mixed program which would include gravel racing. This program was due to start in June 2021 but due to her selection for the delayed 2020 Summer Olympics this was postponed to August. To commence her four-race-long gravel calendar, Cromwell participated in her second SBT GRVL on 15 August. For her return, Cromwell competed in the longer 144-mile (232-kilometre) black course and finished 8th in her group, in a time of 7 hours, 32 minutes and 45 seconds. Six days later, she competed in the North Carolina Belgian Waffle Ride (BWR) hosted in Asheville. Cromwell completed the 102-mile (164-kilometre) "waffle" course in 5 hours, 30 minutes and 42 seconds, recording a third-place finish. Cromwell's third gravel race of the year was due to be the three-day event hosted by Gravel Epic in Marrakesh on 7–9 October, but this was postponed due to the COVID-19 pandemic in Morocco. Cromwell's final gravel race of 2021 was held on 31 October and was the 111.11-mile (178.81-kilometre) Belgian waffle ride hosted in Lawrence, Kansas. In the race, Cromwell, along with Flávia Oliveira and Hannah Shell, made an early breakaway within the first 10 miles. With around a fifth of the race completed, Shell was dropped by the leading pair and Oliveira made a solo attack at mile 22, leaving Cromwell solo and second on the road. Despite this, not long after, Cromwell caught up to Oliveira and passed her for the lead of the race and competed solo for the remaining miles to secure her first win in gravel racing by almost ten minutes.

In April 2025 Cromwell won the Australian National Gravel Championship held at Mt Crawford Forest, South Australia.

== Personal life ==
Since February 2020, Cromwell has been in a relationship with Finnish racing driver Valtteri Bottas.

== Major results ==
2004
Junior Oceania Games

2nd Individual pursuit
3rd Points race
3rd Scratch

2005
Junior Oceania Games

2nd Road race
2nd Scratch
3rd Individual pursuit

Oceania Junior Road Championships

2nd Road race
4th Time trial

2008
1st Garrett Lemire Memorial Grand Prix
1st Sea Otter Classic Circuit Race
2nd Road race, National Under-23 Road Championships
4th Holland Hills Classic
6th Overall Redlands Bicycle Classic
7th Australia World Cup
2009
1st Sea Otter Classic Road Race
1st Stage 3 Tour Féminin en Limousin
1st Stage 2 (ITT) La Route de France
3rd Road race, National Under-23 Road Championships
7th Coupe du Monde Cycliste Féminine de Montréal
9th Overall Tour of the Gila
10th Overall Women's Tour of New Zealand
2010
National Under-23 Road Championships

2nd Road race
2nd Time trial

2nd Sparkassen Giro
3rd Overall Women's Tour of New Zealand
8th Overall Tour Cycliste Féminin International de l'Ardèche
2011
1st Stage 2 Jayco Bay Cycling Classic
8th Omloop Het Nieuwsblad
2012
1st Stage 5 Giro d'Italia Femminile
2nd Road race, National Road Championships
2nd GP de Plouay – Bretagne
7th Open de Suède Vårgårda
8th Overall Giro della Toscana Int. Femminile – Memorial Michela Fanini
8th Omloop Het Nieuwsblad
8th Gooik–Geraardsbergen–Gooik
9th Overall Grand Prix Elsy Jacobs
2013
1st Omloop Het Nieuwsblad
4th Gooik–Geraardsbergen–Gooik
5th Le Samyn des Dames
7th Overall Ladies Tour of Qatar
9th Road race, UCI Road World Championships
9th Ronde van Drenthe World Cup
9th La Flèche Wallonne Féminine
10th Overall La Route de France
10th Durango-Durango Emakumeen Saria
2014
2nd GP Comune di Cornaredo
4th Road race, Commonwealth Games
5th Road race, UCI Road World Championships
5th Overall Ladies Tour of Norway
6th Overall Energiewacht Tour
6th Overall Auensteiner–Radsporttage
7th Omloop Het Nieuwsblad
7th Novilon EDR Cup
9th Overall Ladies Tour of Qatar
9th Tour of Flanders for Women
10th GP de Plouay
2015
2nd Chrono Champenois
3rd Dwars door de Westhoek
4th Grand Prix Cycliste de Gatineau
5th Omloop Het Nieuwsblad
6th Ronde van Drenthe World Cup
7th Overall Ladies Tour of Qatar
7th Crescent Women World Cup Vårgårda
9th Overall Tour Cycliste Féminin International de l'Ardèche
9th Cadel Evans Great Ocean Road Race
9th EPZ Omloop van Borsele
10th Overall Energiewacht Tour

1st Stage 2a (TTT)

10th Winston-Salem Cycling Classic
2016
1st Stage 4 Giro d'Italia Femminile
3rd Time trial, National Road Championships
3rd Omloop Het Nieuwsblad
4th Acht van Westerveld
5th Overall Women's Tour Down Under
6th Cadel Evans Great Ocean Road Race
7th Overall Ladies Tour of Qatar
7th La Course by Le Tour de France
8th Chrono Champenois
10th Omloop van het Hageland
2017
1st Stage 1 Thüringen Rundfahrt der Frauen
3rd Le Samyn des Dames
6th Pajot Hills Classic
2018
6th Road race, Commonwealth Games
7th Overall Women's Herald Sun Tour
9th Three Days of Bruges–De Panne
2019
1st Stage 1 (TTT) Giro Rosa
2021
7th Overall Thüringen Ladies Tour
2025
1st National Gravel Championships
