= 2017 Women's Tour de Yorkshire =

3rd women's Tour de Yorkshire

Race details
- Dates: 29 April
- Stages: 1
- Distance: 122.5 km (76.12 mi)
- Winning time: 3h 09' 36"

Results
| | Winner | Lizzie Deignan (GBR) | (Boels Dolmans) |
| | Second | Coryn Rivera (USA) | (Team Sunweb) |
| | Third | Georgia Bronzini (ITA) | (Wiggle–High5) |

The 2017 Women's Tour de Yorkshire was a cycling one-day race that took place in Yorkshire in April 2017. It was the second edition of the Women's Tour de Yorkshire and was organised by Welcome to Yorkshire and the Amaury Sport Organisation. The race started in Tadcaster, ended in Harrogate and covered a distance of 122.5 kilometres (76.1 mi).

The race was won by Lizzie Deignan.

== Route ==
The women's stage started at Tadcaster and followed the same route as the men's race; leaving Tadcaster over the newly re-opened Tadcaster Bridge, the route took the riders through Knaresborough, through Lofthouse, Ripon, skirting Fountains Abbey and then into Harrogate where the race culminated on Parliament Street. The race started at 9:20 am and finished around 12:30 pm.

== Teams ==
Eighteen teams were entered in the race. Listed alphabetically, these were;

- Ale Cipollini
- BePink–Cogeas
- Boels Dolmans
- Canyon-SRAM
- Cyclane Pro Cycling
- Drops
- FDJ Nouvelle-Aquitaine Futuroscope
- Fusion RT Fierlan
- Hitec Products
- Lares Waowdeals
- NCC Group-Kuoata Torelli
- Storey Racing
- Sunsport Velo
- Team Ford EcoBoost
- Team Jadan Weldtite
- Team Sunweb
- Team WNT Pro Cycling
- Wiggle-High5

== Final classification ==
Final classification
| Rank | Rider | Team | Time |
|---|---|---|---|
| 1 | Lizzie Deignan (GBR) | Boels Dolmans | 3h 09' 36" |
| 2 | Coryn Rivera (USA) | Team Sunweb | 3h 10' 31" |
| 3 | Georgia Bronzini (ITA) | Wiggle-High5 | s.t. |
| 4 | Amy Pieters (NED) | Boels Dolmans | s.t. |
| 5 | Hannah Barnes (GBR) | Canyon-SRAM | s.t. |
| 6 | Katrine Aalerud (NOR) | Hitec Products | 3h 11' 30" |
| 7 | Sheyla Guiterrez Ruiz (ESP) | Cyclane Pro Cycling | s.t. |
| 8 | Shara Gillow (AUS) | FDJ Nouvelle-Aquitaine Futuroscope | s.t. |
| 9 | Roxanne Kneteman (NED) | FDJ Nouvelle-Aquitaine Futuroscope | s.t. |
| 10 | Danielle King (GBR) | Cyclane Pro Cycling | s.t. |
Source: Tour de Yorkshire website
