= 2016 Giro d'Italia Femminile =

2016 Giro d'Italia Internazionale Femminile
2016 UCI Women's World Tour, race 11 of 17
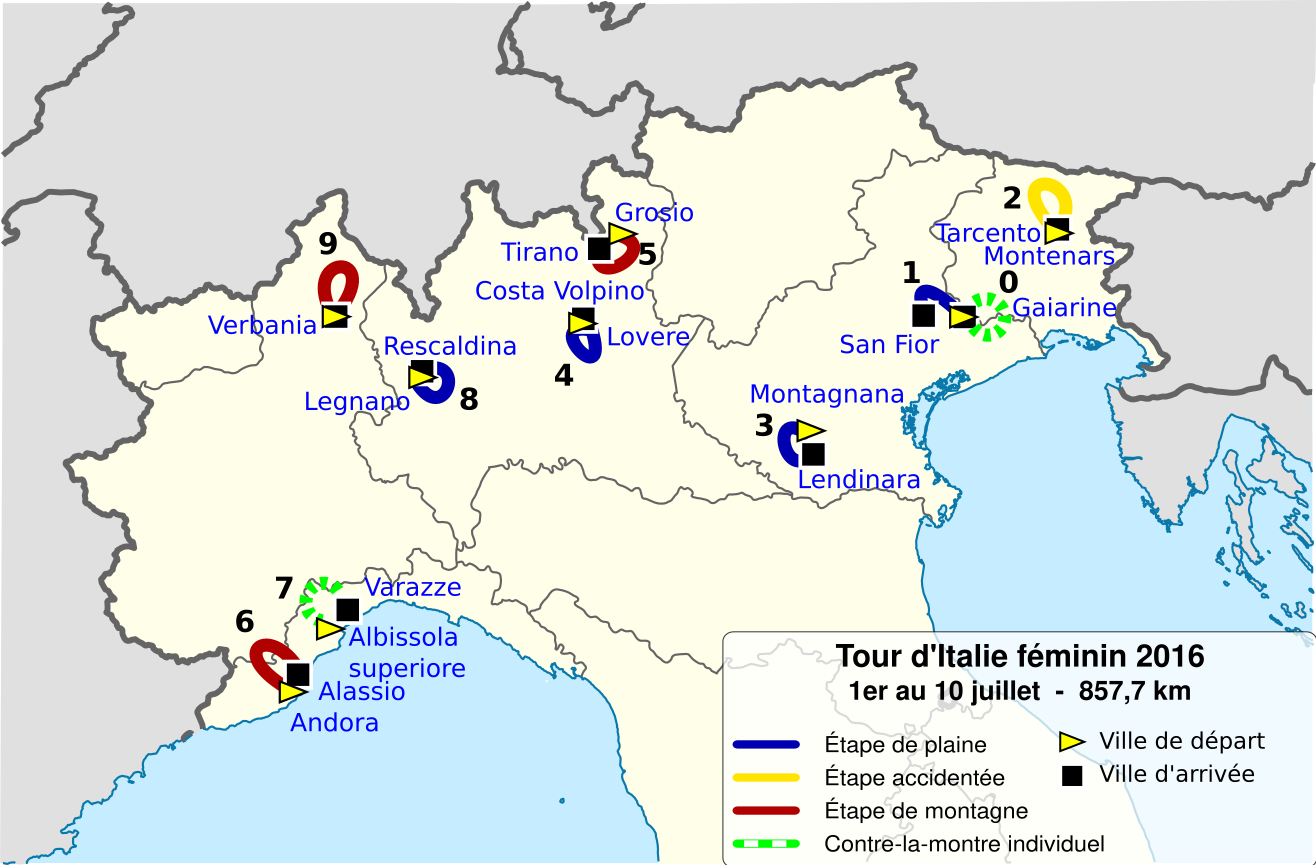

Race details
- Dates: 1–10 July 2016
- Stages: 9 + Prologue
- Distance: 857.7 km (533.0 mi)
- Winning time: 22h 42' 20"

Results
Jersey awarded to the overall winner	Winner	Megan Guarnier (USA)	(Boels–Dolmans)
	Second	Evelyn Stevens (USA)	(Boels–Dolmans)
	Third	Anna van der Breggen (NED)	(Rabobank-Liv Woman Cycling Team)
Jersey awarded to the points classification winner	Points	Megan Guarnier (USA)	(Boels–Dolmans)
Jersey awarded to the mountains classification winner	Mountains	Elisa Longo Borghini (ITA)	(Wiggle High5)
Jersey awarded to the young rider classification winner	Young rider	Katarzyna Niewiadoma (POL)	(Rabobank-Liv Woman Cycling Team)

The 2016 Giro d'Italia Femminile or Giro Rosa was the 27th running of the Giro d'Italia Femminile, the only remaining women's Grand Tour and the most prestigious stage race on the 2016 UCI Women's World Tour and on the women's calendar.

== Competing teams ==
The following teams participated in the Giro:

- Alé–Cipollini
- Aromitalia Vaiano
- Astana
- Bepink
- Bizkaia–Durango
- Boels–Dolmans
- BTC City Ljubljana
- Canyon//SRAM
- Cylance Pro Cycling
- Hagens Berman–Supermint
- Team Hitec Products
- Inpa–Bianchi
- Lensworld–Zannata
- Lointek
- Lotto–Soudal Ladies
- Poitou-Charentes.Futuroscope.86
- Rabobank-Liv Woman Cycling Team
- S.C. Michela Fanini Rox
- Servetto Footon
- Team Liv–Plantur
- Top Girls Fassa Bortolo
- Wiggle High5
- Xirayas de San Luis–OPW

=== Pre race favourites ===
The race has a number of favourites; 2015 Giro Rosa champion Anna van der Breggen and Katarzyna Niewiadoma (Rabobank-Liv Woman Cycling Team), reigning World Champion Lizzie Armitstead, Megan Guarnier and World Hour record holder Evelyn Stevens (Boels–Dolmans), Emma Pooley (Lotto–Soudal Ladies), Elisa Longo Borghini and two-time champion Mara Abbott (Wiggle High5).

== Route ==
Stages
Stage	Date	Course	Distance	Type	Winner
P	1 July	Gaiarine	2 km (1.2 mi)	Individual time trial	Leah Kirchmann (CAN)
1	2 July	Gaiarine – San Fior	104 km (64.6 mi)	Flat stage	Giorgia Bronzini (ITA)
2	3 July	Tarcento – Montenars	111.1 km (69.0 mi)	Hilly stage	Evelyn Stevens (USA)
3	4 July	Montagnana – Lendinara	120 km (74.6 mi)	Flat stage	Chloe Hosking (AUS)
4	5 July	Costa Volpino – Lovere	98.5 km (61.2 mi)	Flat stage	Tiffany Cromwell (AUS)
5	6 July	Grosio – Tirano	77.5 km (48.2 mi)	Mountain stage	Mara Abbott (USA)
6	7 July	Andora – Alassio/Madonna della Guardia	118.6 km (73.7 mi)	Mountain stage	Evelyn Stevens (USA)
7	8 July	Albisola Superiore – Varazze	21.9 km (13.6 mi)	Individual time trial	Evelyn Stevens (USA)
8	9 July	Rescaldina – Legnano	99.3 km (61.7 mi)	Flat stage	Giorgia Bronzini (ITA)
9	10 July	Verbania – Verbania	104.8 km (65.1 mi)	Hilly stage	Thalita de Jong (NED)

== Stages ==
=== Prologue ===
1 July 2016 – Gaiarine – Gaiarine, 2.0 km (1.2 mi)

Prologue Result
Rank	Rider	Team	Time
1	Leah Kirchmann (CAN)	Team Liv–Plantur	2' 23"
2	Thalita de Jong (NED)	Rabobank-Liv Woman Cycling Team	+ 1"
3	Anna van der Breggen (NED)	Rabobank-Liv Woman Cycling Team	+ 1"
4	Megan Guarnier (USA)	Boels–Dolmans	+ 3"
5	Roxane Knetemann (NED)	Rabobank-Liv Woman Cycling Team	+ 3"
6	Tiffany Cromwell (AUS)	Canyon//SRAM	+ 4"
7	Katarzyna Niewiadoma (POL)	Rabobank-Liv Woman Cycling Team	+ 5"
8	Amalie Dideriksen (DEN)	Boels–Dolmans	+ 5"
9	Barbara Guarischi (ITA)	Canyon//SRAM	+ 5"
10	Evelyn Stevens (USA)	Boels–Dolmans	+ 6"

General classification after Prologue
Rank	Rider	Team	Time
1	Leah Kirchmann (CAN)	Team Liv–Plantur	2" 23"
2	Thalita de Jong (NED)	Rabobank-Liv Woman Cycling Team	+ 1"
3	Anna van der Breggen (NED)	Rabobank-Liv Woman Cycling Team	+ 1"
4	Megan Guarnier (USA)	Boels–Dolmans	+ 3"
5	Roxane Knetemann (NED)	Rabobank-Liv Woman Cycling Team	+ 3"
6	Tiffany Cromwell (AUS)	Canyon//SRAM	+ 4"
7	Katarzyna Niewiadoma (POL)	Rabobank-Liv Woman Cycling Team	+ 5"
8	Amalie Dideriksen (DEN)	Boels–Dolmans	+ 5"
9	Barbara Guarischi (ITA)	Canyon//SRAM	+ 5"
10	Evelyn Stevens (USA)	Boels–Dolmans	+ 6"

=== Stage 1 ===
2 July 2016 – Gaiarine – San Fior, 104.0 km (64.6 mi)

Stage 1 result
Rank	Rider	Team	Time
1	Giorgia Bronzini (ITA)	Wiggle High5	2h 38' 22"
2	Megan Guarnier (USA)	Boels–Dolmans	s.t.
3	Rasa Leleivytė (LTU)	Aromitalia Vaiano	s.t.
4	Katarzyna Niewiadoma (POL)	Rabobank-Liv Woman Cycling Team	s.t.
5	Claudia Lichtenberg (GER)	Lotto–Soudal Ladies	s.t.
6	Tatiana Guderzo (ITA)	Team Hitec Products	s.t.
7	Evelyn Stevens (USA)	Boels–Dolmans	+ 5"
8	Lizzie Armitstead (GBR)	Boels–Dolmans	+ 5"
9	Mara Abbott (USA)	Wiggle High5	+ 9"
10	Elisa Longo Borghini (ITA)	Wiggle High5	+ 24"

General classification after Stage 1
Rank	Rider	Team	Time
1	Megan Guarnier (USA)	Boels–Dolmans	2h 40' 42"
2	Katarzyna Niewiadoma (POL)	Rabobank-Liv Woman Cycling Team	+ 8"
3	Giorgia Bronzini (ITA)	Wiggle High5	+ 8"
4	Rasa Leleivytė (LTU)	Aromitalia Vaiano	+ 13"
5	Evelyn Stevens (USA)	Boels–Dolmans	+ 14"
6	Lizzie Armitstead (GBR)	Boels–Dolmans	+ 14"
7	Claudia Lichtenberg (GER)	Lotto–Soudal Ladies	+ 15"
8	Tatiana Guderzo (ITA)	Team Hitec Products	+ 15"
9	Elisa Longo Borghini (ITA)	Wiggle High5	+ 33"
10	Mara Abbott (USA)	Wiggle High5	+ 37"

=== Stage 2 ===
3 July 2016 – Tarcento – Montenars, 111.1 km (69.0 mi)

Stage 2 result
Rank	Rider	Team	Time
1	Evelyn Stevens (USA)	Boels–Dolmans	2h 48' 26"
2	Elisa Longo Borghini (ITA)	Wiggle High5	s.t.
3	Katarzyna Niewiadoma (POL)	Rabobank-Liv Woman Cycling Team	+ 2"
4	Mara Abbott (USA)	Wiggle High5	+ 3"
5	Megan Guarnier (USA)	Boels–Dolmans	+ 24"
6	Claudia Lichtenberg (GER)	Lotto–Soudal Ladies	+ 24"
7	Rasa Leleivytė (LTU)	Aromitalia Vaiano	+ 33"
8	Leah Kirchmann (CAN)	Team Liv–Plantur	+ 33"
9	Anna van der Breggen (NED)	Rabobank-Liv Woman Cycling Team	+ 33"
10	Tatiana Guderzo (ITA)	Team Hitec Products	+ 33"

General classification after Stage 2
Rank	Rider	Team	Time
1	Evelyn Stevens (USA)	Boels–Dolmans	5h 29' 12"
2	Katarzyna Niewiadoma (POL)	Rabobank-Liv Woman Cycling Team	+ 2"
3	Megan Guarnier (USA)	Boels–Dolmans	+ 18"
4	Elisa Longo Borghini (ITA)	Wiggle High5	+ 23"
5	Claudia Lichtenberg (GER)	Lotto–Soudal Ladies	+ 35"
6	Mara Abbott (USA)	Wiggle High5	+ 36"
7	Rasa Leleivytė (LTU)	Aromitalia Vaiano	+ 42"
8	Tatiana Guderzo (ITA)	Team Hitec Products	+ 44"
9	Leah Kirchmann (CAN)	Team Liv–Plantur	+1' 12"
10	Anna van der Breggen (NED)	Rabobank-Liv Woman Cycling Team	+1' 13"

=== Stage 3 ===
4 July 2016 – Montagnana – Lendinara, 120.0 km (74.6 mi)

Stage 3 result
Rank	Rider	Team	Time
1	Chloe Hosking (AUS)	Wiggle High5	2h 50' 14"
2	Marta Tagliaferro (ITA)	Alé–Cipollini	s.t.
3	Giorgia Bronzini (ITA)	Wiggle High5	s.t.
4	Roxane Fournier (FRA)	Poitou-Charentes.Futuroscope.86	s.t.
5	Barbara Guarischi (ITA)	Canyon//SRAM	s.t.
6	Lucinda Brand (NED)	Rabobank-Liv Woman Cycling Team	s.t.
7	Megan Guarnier (USA)	Boels–Dolmans	s.t.
8	Leah Kirchmann (CAN)	Team Liv–Plantur	s.t.
9	Thalita de Jong (NED)	Rabobank-Liv Woman Cycling Team	s.t.
10	Michela Pavin (ITA)	Inpa–Bianchi	s.t.

General classification after Stage 3
Rank	Rider	Team	Time
1	Evelyn Stevens (USA)	Boels–Dolmans	8h 19' 25"
2	Katarzyna Niewiadoma (POL)	Rabobank-Liv Woman Cycling Team	+ 3"
3	Megan Guarnier (USA)	Boels–Dolmans	+ 16"
4	Elisa Longo Borghini (ITA)	Wiggle High5	+ 24"
5	Claudia Lichtenberg (GER)	Lotto–Soudal Ladies	+ 36"
6	Mara Abbott (USA)	Wiggle High5	+ 37"
7	Rasa Leleivytė (LTU)	Aromitalia Vaiano	+ 43"
8	Tatiana Guderzo (ITA)	Team Hitec Products	+ 45"
9	Leah Kirchmann (CAN)	Team Liv–Plantur	+ 1' 13"
10	Anna van der Breggen (NED)	Rabobank-Liv Woman Cycling Team	+ 1' 14"

=== Stage 4 ===
5 July 2016 – Costa Volpino – Lovere, 98.5 km (61.2 mi)

Stage 4 result
Rank	Rider	Team	Time
1	Tiffany Cromwell (AUS)	Canyon//SRAM	2h 02' 24"
2	Maria Giulia Confalonieri (ITA)	Lensworld–Zannata	s.t.
3	Aude Biannic (FRA)	Poitou-Charentes.Futuroscope.86	s.t.
4	Marta Bastianelli (ITA)	Alé–Cipollini	s.t.
5	Michela Pavin (ITA)	Inpa–Bianchi	s.t.
6	Arianna Fidanza (ITA)	Astana	s.t.
7	Soraya Paladin (ITA)	Top Girls Fassa Bortolo	s.t.
8	Leah Kirchmann (CAN)	Team Liv–Plantur	s.t.
9	Sheyla Gutiérrez (ESP)	Cylance Pro Cycling	s.t.
10	Ilaria Sanguineti (ITA)	Bepink	s.t.

General classification after Stage 4
Rank	Rider	Team	Time
1	Evelyn Stevens (USA)	Boels–Dolmans	10h 21' 49"
2	Katarzyna Niewiadoma (POL)	Rabobank-Liv Woman Cycling Team	+ 3"
3	Megan Guarnier (USA)	Boels–Dolmans	+ 13"
4	Elisa Longo Borghini (ITA)	Wiggle High5	+ 24"
5	Claudia Lichtenberg (GER)	Lotto–Soudal Ladies	+ 36"
6	Rasa Leleivytė (LTU)	Aromitalia Vaiano	+ 43"
7	Tatiana Guderzo (ITA)	Team Hitec Products	+ 45"
8	Mara Abbott (USA)	Wiggle High5	+ 50"
9	Leah Kirchmann (CAN)	Team Liv–Plantur	+ 1' 13"
10	Anna van der Breggen (NED)	Rabobank-Liv Woman Cycling Team	+ 1' 14"

=== Stage 5 ===
6 July 2016 – Grosio – Tirano, 77.5 km (48.2 mi)

Stage 5 result
Rank	Rider	Team	Time
1	Mara Abbott (USA)	Wiggle High5	2h 40' 23"
2	Elisa Longo Borghini (ITA)	Wiggle High5	+ 37"
3	Tatiana Guderzo (ITA)	Team Hitec Products	+ 37"
4	Megan Guarnier (USA)	Boels–Dolmans	+ 37"
5	Claudia Lichtenberg (GER)	Lotto–Soudal Ladies	+ 37"
6	Anna van der Breggen (NED)	Rabobank-Liv Woman Cycling Team	+ 1' 36"
7	Ksenyia Tuhai (BLR)	Bepink	+ 1' 51"
8	Yevgenia Vysotska (UKR)	Hagens Berman–Supermint	+ 1' 52"
9	Evelyn Stevens (USA)	Boels–Dolmans	+ 2' 02"
10	Doris Schweizer (SUI)	Cylance Pro Cycling	+ 2' 48"

General classification after Stage 5
Rank	Rider	Team	Time
1	Mara Abbott (USA)	Wiggle High5	13h 02' 52"
2	Megan Guarnier (USA)	Boels–Dolmans	+ 10"
3	Elisa Longo Borghini (ITA)	Wiggle High5	+ 15"
4	Claudia Lichtenberg (GER)	Lotto–Soudal Ladies	+ 33"
5	Tatiana Guderzo (ITA)	Team Hitec Products	+ 38"
6	Evelyn Stevens (USA)	Boels–Dolmans	+ 1' 22"
7	Anna van der Breggen (NED)	Rabobank-Liv Woman Cycling Team	+ 2' 10"
8	Yevgenia Vysotska (UKR)	Hagens Berman–Supermint	+ 3' 04"
9	Katarzyna Niewiadoma (POL)	Rabobank-Liv Woman Cycling Team	+ 3' 49"
10	Doris Schweizer (SUI)	Cylance Pro Cycling	+ 4' 42"

=== Stage 6 ===
7 July 2016 – Andora – Alassio/Madonna della Guardia, 118.6 km (73.7 mi)

Stage 6 result
Rank	Rider	Team	Time
1	Evelyn Stevens (USA)	Boels–Dolmans	3h 47' 42"
2	Megan Guarnier (USA)	Boels–Dolmans	+ 6"
3	Anna van der Breggen (NED)	Rabobank-Liv Woman Cycling Team	+ 19"
4	Claudia Lichtenberg (GER)	Lotto–Soudal Ladies	+ 40"
5	Mara Abbott (USA)	Wiggle High5	+ 53"
6	Tatiana Guderzo (ITA)	Team Hitec Products	+ 1' 18"
7	Katarzyna Niewiadoma (POL)	Rabobank-Liv Woman Cycling Team	+ 2' 28"
8	Elena Cecchini (ITA)	Canyon//SRAM	+ 3' 55"
9	Ksenyia Tuhai (BLR)	Bepink	+ 4' 22"
10	Alena Amialiusik (BLR)	Canyon//SRAM	+ 6' 00"

General classification after Stage 6
Rank	Rider	Team	Time
1	Megan Guarnier (USA)	Boels–Dolmans	16h 50' 41"
2	Mara Abbott (USA)	Wiggle High5	+ 46"
3	Evelyn Stevens (USA)	Boels–Dolmans	+ 1' 03"
4	Claudia Lichtenberg (GER)	Lotto–Soudal Ladies	+ 1' 06"
5	Tatiana Guderzo (ITA)	Team Hitec Products	+ 1' 49"
6	Anna van der Breggen (NED)	Rabobank-Liv Woman Cycling Team	+ 2' 18"
7	Katarzyna Niewiadoma (POL)	Rabobank-Liv Woman Cycling Team	+ 6' 40"
8	Ksenyia Tuhai (BLR)	Bepink	+ 12' 11"
9	Alena Amialiusik (BLR)	Canyon//SRAM	+ 12' 33"
10	Leah Kirchmann (CAN)	Team Liv–Plantur	+ 12' 37"

=== Stage 7 ===
8 July 2016 – Albisola Superiore – Varazze
ITT, 21.9 km (13.6 mi)

Stage 7 result
Rank	Rider	Team	Time
1	Evelyn Stevens (USA)	Boels–Dolmans	36' 22"
2	Anna van der Breggen (NED)	Rabobank-Liv Woman Cycling Team	+ 4"
3	Elisa Longo Borghini (ITA)	Wiggle High5	+ 4"
4	Megan Guarnier (USA)	Boels–Dolmans	+ 29"
5	Katarzyna Niewiadoma (POL)	Rabobank-Liv Woman Cycling Team	+ 37"
6	Karol-Ann Canuel (CAN)	Boels–Dolmans	+ 1' 04"
7	Doris Schweizer (SUI)	Cylance Pro Cycling	+ 1' 32"
8	Leah Kirchmann (CAN)	Team Liv–Plantur	+ 1' 34"
9	Thalita de Jong (NED)	Rabobank-Liv Woman Cycling Team	+ 1' 39"
10	Tatiana Guderzo (ITA)	Team Hitec Products	+ 1' 45"

General classification after Stage 7
Rank	Rider	Team	Time
1	Megan Guarnier (USA)	Boels–Dolmans	17h 21' 31"
2	Evelyn Stevens (United States)	Boels–Dolmans	+ 34"
3	Anna van der Breggen (NED)	Rabobank-Liv Woman Cycling Team	+ 1' 53"
4	Mara Abbott (USA)	Wiggle High5	+ 2' 07"
5	Claudia Lichtenberg (GER)	Lotto–Soudal Ladies	+ 2' 33"
6	Tatiana Guderzo (ITA)	Team Hitec Products	+ 3' 05"
7	Katarzyna Niewiadoma (POL)	Rabobank-Liv Woman Cycling Team	+ 6' 48"
8	Leah Kirchmann (CAN)	Team Liv–Plantur	+ 13' 42"
9	Alena Amialiusik (BLR)	Canyon//SRAM	+ 13' 53"
10	Ksenyia Tuhai (BLR)	Bepink	+ 14' 45"

=== Stage 8 ===
9 July 2016 – Rescaldina – Legnano, 99.3 km (61.7 mi)

Stage 8 result
Rank	Rider	Team	Time
1	Giorgia Bronzini (ITA)	Wiggle High5	2h 28' 48"
2	Marta Bastianelli (ITA)	Alé–Cipollini	s.t.
3	Maria Giulia Confalonieri (ITA)	Lensworld–Zannata	s.t.
4	Michela Pavin (ITA)	Inpa–Bianchi	s.t.
5	Lucinda Brand (NED)	Rabobank-Liv Woman Cycling Team	s.t.
6	Roxane Fournier (ITA)	Poitou-Charentes.Futuroscope.86	s.t.
7	Ilaria Sanguineti (ITA)	Bepink	s.t.
8	Tiffany Cromwell (AUS)	Canyon//SRAM	s.t.
9	Sheyla Gutiérrez (ESP)	Cylance Pro Cycling	s.t.
10	Lauren Kitchen (AUS)	Team Hitec Products	s.t.

General classification after Stage 8
Rank	Rider	Team	Time
1	Megan Guarnier (USA)	Boels–Dolmans	19h 56' 19"
2	Evelyn Stevens (USA)	Boels–Dolmans	+ 34"
3	Anna van der Breggen (NED)	Rabobank-Liv Woman Cycling Team	+ 1' 53"
4	Mara Abbott (USA)	Wiggle High5	+ 2' 07"
5	Claudia Lichtenberg (GER)	Lotto–Soudal Ladies	+ 2' 33"
6	Tatiana Guderzo (ITA)	Team Hitec Products	+ 3' 05"
7	Katarzyna Niewiadoma (POL)	Rabobank-Liv Woman Cycling Team	+ 6' 48"
8	Leah Kirchmann (CAN)	Team Liv–Plantur	+ 13' 42"
9	Alena Amialiusik (BLR)	Canyon//SRAM	+ 13' 53"
10	Ksenyia Tuhai (BLR)	Bepink	+ 14' 45"

=== Stage 9 ===
10 July 2016 – Verbania – Verbania, 104.8 km (65.1 mi)

Stage 9 result
Rank	Rider	Team	Time
1	Thalita de Jong (NED)	Rabobank-Liv Woman Cycling Team	2h 44' 24"
2	Riejanne Markus (NED)	Team Liv–Plantur	+ 1' 05"
3	Maria Giulia Confalonieri (ITA)	Lensworld–Zannata	+ 1' 05"
4	Íngrid Drexel (MEX)	Astana	+ 1' 05"
5	Ane Santesteban (ESP)	Alé–Cipollini	+ 1' 05"
6	Mayuko Hagiwara (JPN)	Wiggle High5	+ 1' 05"
7	Sheyla Gutiérrez (ESP)	Cylance Pro Cycling	+ 1' 54"
8	Katarzyna Niewiadoma (POL)	Rabobank-Liv Woman Cycling Team	+ 1' 57"
9	Megan Guarnier (USA)	Boels–Dolmans	+ 1' 57"
10	Anna van der Breggen (NED)	Rabobank-Liv Woman Cycling Team	+ 1' 57"

General classification after Stage 9
Rank	Rider	Team	Time
1	Megan Guarnier (USA)	Boels–Dolmans	22h 42' 20"
2	Evelyn Stevens (USA)	Boels–Dolmans	+ 34"
3	Anna van der Breggen (NED)	Rabobank-Liv Woman Cycling Team	+ 1' 53"
4	Claudia Lichtenberg (GER)	Lotto–Soudal Ladies	+ 2' 33"
5	Mara Abbott (USA)	Wiggle High5	+ 2' 38"
6	Tatiana Guderzo (ITA)	Team Hitec Products	+ 3' 05"
7	Katarzyna Niewiadoma (POL)	Rabobank-Liv Woman Cycling Team	+ 6' 48"
8	Leah Kirchmann (CAN)	Team Liv–Plantur	+ 15' 17"
9	Alena Amialiusik (BLR)	Canyon//SRAM	+ 16' 18"
10	Ksenyia Tuhai (BLR)	Bepink	+ 16' 20"

== Classification leadership ==
Stage	Winner	General classification	Points classification	Mountains classification	Young rider classification	Italian rider classification
P	Leah Kirchmann	Leah Kirchmann	Leah Kirchmann	Not Awarded	Katarzyna Niewiadoma	Barbara Guarischi
1	Giorgia Bronzini	Megan Guarnier	Megan Guarnier	Elisa Longo Borghini	Katarzyna Niewiadoma	Giorgia Bronzini
2	Evelyn Stevens	Evelyn Stevens	Megan Guarnier	Evelyn Stevens	Katarzyna Niewiadoma	Elisa Longo Borghini
3	Chloe Hosking	Evelyn Stevens	Megan Guarnier	Elisa Longo Borghini	Katarzyna Niewiadoma	Elisa Longo Borghini
4	Tiffany Cromwell	Evelyn Stevens	Megan Guarnier	Elisa Longo Borghini	Katarzyna Niewiadoma	Elisa Longo Borghini
5	Mara Abbott	Mara Abbott	Megan Guarnier	Elisa Longo Borghini	Katarzyna Niewiadoma	Elisa Longo Borghini
6	Evelyn Stevens	Megan Guarnier	Megan Guarnier	Elisa Longo Borghini	Katarzyna Niewiadoma	Tatiana Guderzo
7 (ITT)	Evelyn Stevens	Megan Guarnier	Megan Guarnier	Elisa Longo Borghini	Katarzyna Niewiadoma	Tatiana Guderzo
8	Giorgia Bronzini	Megan Guarnier	Megan Guarnier	Elisa Longo Borghini	Katarzyna Niewiadoma	Tatiana Guderzo
9	Thalita de Jong	Megan Guarnier	Megan Guarnier	Elisa Longo Borghini	Katarzyna Niewiadoma	Tatiana Guderzo
Final		Megan Guarnier	Megan Guarnier	Elisa Longo Borghini	Katarzyna Niewiadoma	Tatiana Guderzo

== See also ==
- 2016 in women's road cycling
