= Strade Bianche Donne =

Italian one-day road cycling race

Race details
- Date: Early March
- Region: Tuscany, Italy
- English name: Strade Bianche Women
- Local name: Strade Bianche Donne (in Italian)
- Discipline: Road
- Competition: UCI Women's World Tour
- Type: One-day race
- Organiser: RCS Sport
- Web site: www.strade-bianche.it

History
- First edition: 2015
- Editions: 12 (as of 2026)
- First winner: Megan Guarnier (USA)
- Most wins: Annemiek van Vleuten (NED); Lotte Kopecky (BEL); Demi Vollering (NED) (2)
- Most recent: Elise Chabbey (SUI)

The Strade Bianche Donne (Strade Bianche Women), also named Strade Bianche Rosa by Italian media, is an annual professional women's road bicycle racing event in Tuscany, Italy. Roughly a quarter of the route is raced on white gravel roads – unpaved country lanes winding through the countryside of the Chianti region – from which the event gets its name. The race finishes in the Piazza del Campo in Siena.

First held in 2015, the race is part of the UCI Women's World Tour, cycling's top-tier female elite competition. It is organized on the same day as the men's race, on the first or second Saturday of March, on much of the same roads but at a shorter distance. Dutch riders Annemiek van Vleuten and Demi Vollering and Belgian rider Lotte Kopecky have each won two editions of the race.

== History ==
The first women's Strade Bianche was organized in 2015, following the success of the men's event, which was created in 2007. The inaugural edition was won by American Megan Guarnier after distancing her teammate Lizzie Armitstead and Italian Elisa Longo Borghini during the final stretches of the race.

In 2016, the event was upgraded to UCI World Tour level, the highest level of international women's cycling. Britain's Lizzie Armitstead won the race in the rainbow jersey as ruling world road champion. Elisa Longo Borghini won the third edition in 2017, becoming the first Italian winner of the Strade Bianche.

The 2018 race was run in abysmal weather, with cold temperatures and heavy rainfall making the gravel roads exceptionally muddy. Ruling Olympic road race champion Anna van der Breggen won the edition after a 17 km solo attack. Van der Breggen held a one-minute lead on Poland's Kasia Niewiadoma, who finished second for the third consecutive year. Only 59 of 136 starters finished the race and 17 women arrived outside of the time limit.

The 2020 edition of the race was postponed to August due to the COVID-19 pandemic. In 2023, Dutch rider Demi Vollering outsprinted her SD Worx teammate Lotte Kopecky at the finish to win the race.

By the mid 2020s, media discussed the possibility of the race being elevated to a "cycling monument" in future.

== Route ==
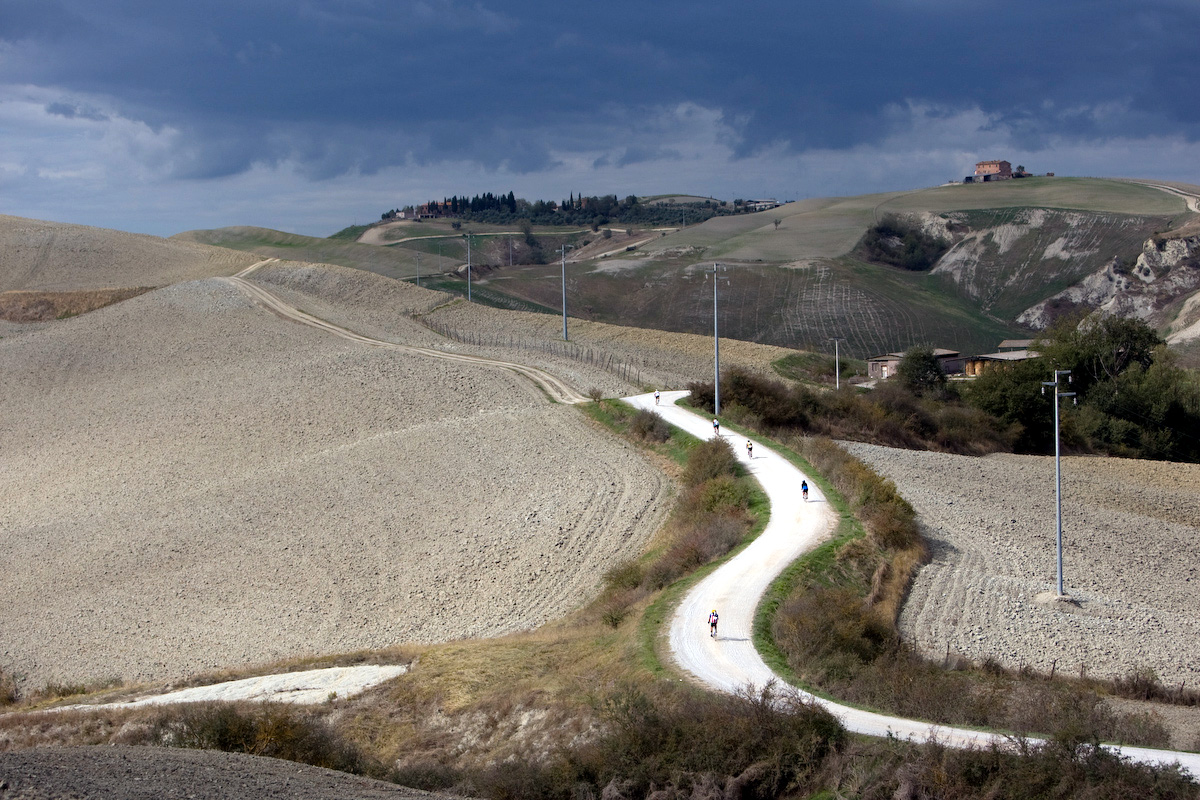
One of the gravel roads in the province of Siena

The Strade Bianche starts and finishes in Siena, crossing the southern half of the province of Siena in Tuscany. The race is run over 136 kilometres (85 mi) on undulating terrain and is characterized by the presence of white gravel roads; unpaved country lanes winding through the hills and vineyards of the Chianti region. There are sectors of gravel in varying lengths and difficulty, with the 2025 edition of the race featuring 50 kilometres (31 mi) of dirt roads.

The first edition started in San Gimignano and finished in Siena, both UNESCO World Heritage Sites. The inaugural race was run over a distance of 103 km and featured five gravel sectors, totalling 17 km of strade bianche. In 2016, the start of the race moved to Siena. The total distance was increased to 121 km, including 22.4 km of dirt roads spread over seven sectors. Six sectors were in common with the men's route.

Additional gravel sectors have been added to the route over time, with the race distance remaining around 136 kilometres (85 mi) in length. In 2018, an extra gravel sector was added, bringing the total to 30 km of dirt roads on eight sectors. In 2024, four additional gravel sectors were added to the route. In 2025, an additional gravel sector was added, with the total length of gravel sectors exceeding 50 kilometres (31 mi).

The longest strada bianca is the 9.5 km sector of San Martino in Grania. The most notorious is the four-starred sector of Colle Pinzuto, at 20 km from the finish. The final gravel sector is in Le Tolfe, just northeast of Siena, after which 12 km remain to the finish. The final kilometre is on the roughly-paved Via Santa Caterina in the heart of the medieval city. The narrow ascent contains steep sections of 16% followed by a short descent and a flat finish on Siena's illustrious Piazza del Campo.

== Winners ==
Riders who win the race three times will have a gravel sector named after them. As of 2025, no women have won the race three times.

Year	Country	Rider	Team
2015	United States	Megan Guarnier	Boels–Dolmans
2016	Great Britain	Lizzie Armitstead	Boels–Dolmans
2017	Italy	Elisa Longo Borghini	Wiggle High5
2018	Netherlands	Anna van der Breggen	Boels–Dolmans
2019	Netherlands	Annemiek van Vleuten	Mitchelton–Scott
2020	Netherlands	Annemiek van Vleuten	Mitchelton–Scott
2021	Netherlands	Chantal van den Broek-Blaak	SD Worx
2022	Belgium	Lotte Kopecky	SD Worx
2023	Netherlands	Demi Vollering	SD Worx
2024	Belgium	Lotte Kopecky	Team SD Worx–Protime
2025	Netherlands	Demi Vollering	FDJ–Suez
2026	Switzerland	Elise Chabbey	FDJ United–Suez

=== Wins per country ===
Wins	Country
6	Netherlands
2	Belgium
1	Great Britain, Italy, Switzerland, United States
