= 2013 Omloop Het Nieuwsblad (women's race) =

Race details
- Dates: 23 February 2013
- Stages: 1
- Distance: 125 km (78 mi)
- Winning time: 3h 34' 00"

Results
| | Winner | Tiffany Cromwell (Australia) | (Orica–AIS) |
| | Second | Megan Guarnier (United States) | (Rabobank-Liv Giant) |
| | Third | Emma Johansson (Sweden) | (Orica–AIS) |

The 2013 Omloop Het Nieuwsblad was the 8th edition of the women's Omloop Het Nieuwsblad road cycling one-day race, which took place on 23 February. The race started and ended in Ghent and covered 125 km (77.7 mi) in the province of East Flanders.

The race was won by Australian rider Tiffany Cromwell in a sprint from Megan Guarnier. Emma Johansson won the sprint of the group behind the two and finished third.

== Results ==
Final general classification
| Rank | Rider | Team | Time |
|---|---|---|---|
| 1 | Tiffany Cromwell (AUS) | Orica–AIS | 3h 34' 00" |
| 2 | Megan Guarnier (USA) | Rabobank-Liv Giant | + 3" |
| 3 | Emma Johansson (SWE) | Orica–AIS | + 12" |
| 4 | Annemiek van Vleuten (NED) | Rabobank-Liv Giant | + 12" |
| 5 | Shelley Olds (USA) | Team TIBCO | + 12" |
| 6 | Ellen van Dijk (NED) | Specialized–lululemon | + 12" |
| 7 | Chantal Blaak (NED) | Team TIBCO | + 12" |
| 8 | Anna van der Breggen (NED) | Sengers Ladies Cycling Team | + 12" |
| 9 | Roxane Knetemann (NED) | Rabobank-Liv Giant | + 12" |
| 10 | Loes Gunnewijk (NED) | Orica–AIS | + 12" |
