= 2015 Strade Bianche Women =

2015 Strade Bianche
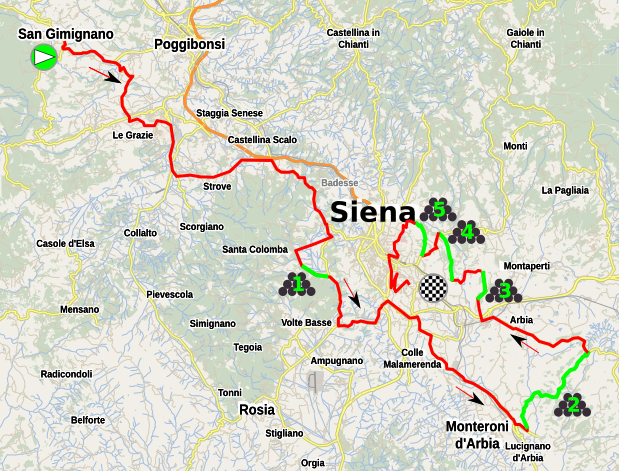
- Route of the inaugural event

Race details
- Dates: 7 March 2015
- Distance: 103 km (64 mi)
- Winning time: 2h 59' 17"

Results
	Winner	Megan Guarnier (USA)	(Boels–Dolmans)
	Second	Lizzie Armitstead (GBR)	(Boels–Dolmans)
	Third	Elisa Longo Borghini (ITA)	(Wiggle–Honda)

The 2015 Strade Bianche was the first running of the Strade Bianche Donne, a one-day women's cycling race in Italy that was held on 7 March 2015. The race started in San Gimignano and finished on Siena's Piazza del Campo and was run entirely in the province of Siena, in the Chianti region of Tuscany. The inaugural edition was spun off the men's event, which started in 2007, and had a UCI rating of 1.1.

The event was won by American Megan Guarnier after distancing her teammate Lizzie Armitstead and Italian Elisa Longo Borghini during the final stretches of the race. Like the men's race, the women's race featured five gravel sectors, totalling 17 kilometres (11 miles).

== Teams ==
16 teams competed in the race.

- Rabobank-Liv Woman Cycling Team
- Boels–Dolmans
- Wiggle–Honda
- Velocio–SRAM
- Orica–AIS
- Bigla Pro Cycling Team
- Lotto–Soudal Ladies
- Alé–Cipollini
- Inpa Sottoli Giusfredi
- Astana–Acca Due O
- BTC City Ljubljana
- Servetto Footon
- S.C. Michela Fanini Rox
- BePink–La Classica
- Aromitalia Vaiano
- Top Girls Fassa Bortolo

== Results ==
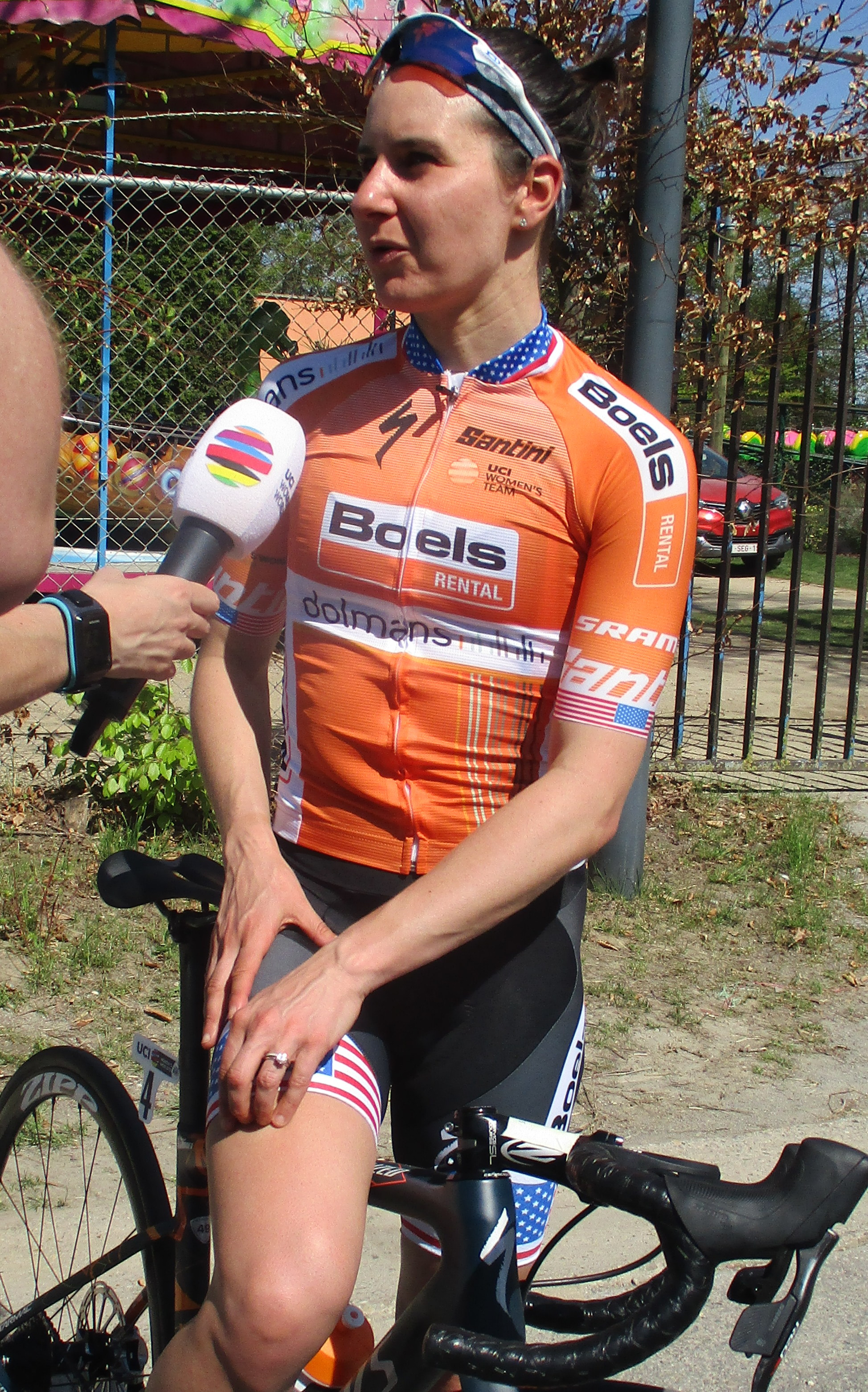
American Megan Guarnier, pictured in 2018, won the inaugural edition of the race.

Result
Rank	Rider	Team	Time
1	Megan Guarnier (USA)	Boels–Dolmans	2h 59' 17"
2	Lizzie Armitstead (GBR)	Boels–Dolmans	+ 37"
3	Elisa Longo Borghini (ITA)	Wiggle–Honda	+ 37"
4	Ashleigh Moolman (RSA)	Bigla Pro Cycling Team	+ 39"
5	Anna van der Breggen (NED)	Rabobank-Liv Woman Cycling Team	+ 46"
6	Katarzyna Niewiadoma (POL)	Rabobank-Liv Woman Cycling Team	+ 52"
7	Alena Amialiusik (BLR)	Velocio–SRAM	+ 54"
8	Hanna Solovey (UKR)	Astana–Acca Due O	+ 1' 04"
9	Annemiek van Vleuten (NED)	Bigla Pro Cycling Team	+ 1' 10"
10	Elena Cecchini (ITA)	Lotto–Soudal Ladies	+ 4' 01"

== See also ==
- 2015 in women's road cycling
