= 2015 Giro d'Italia Femminile =

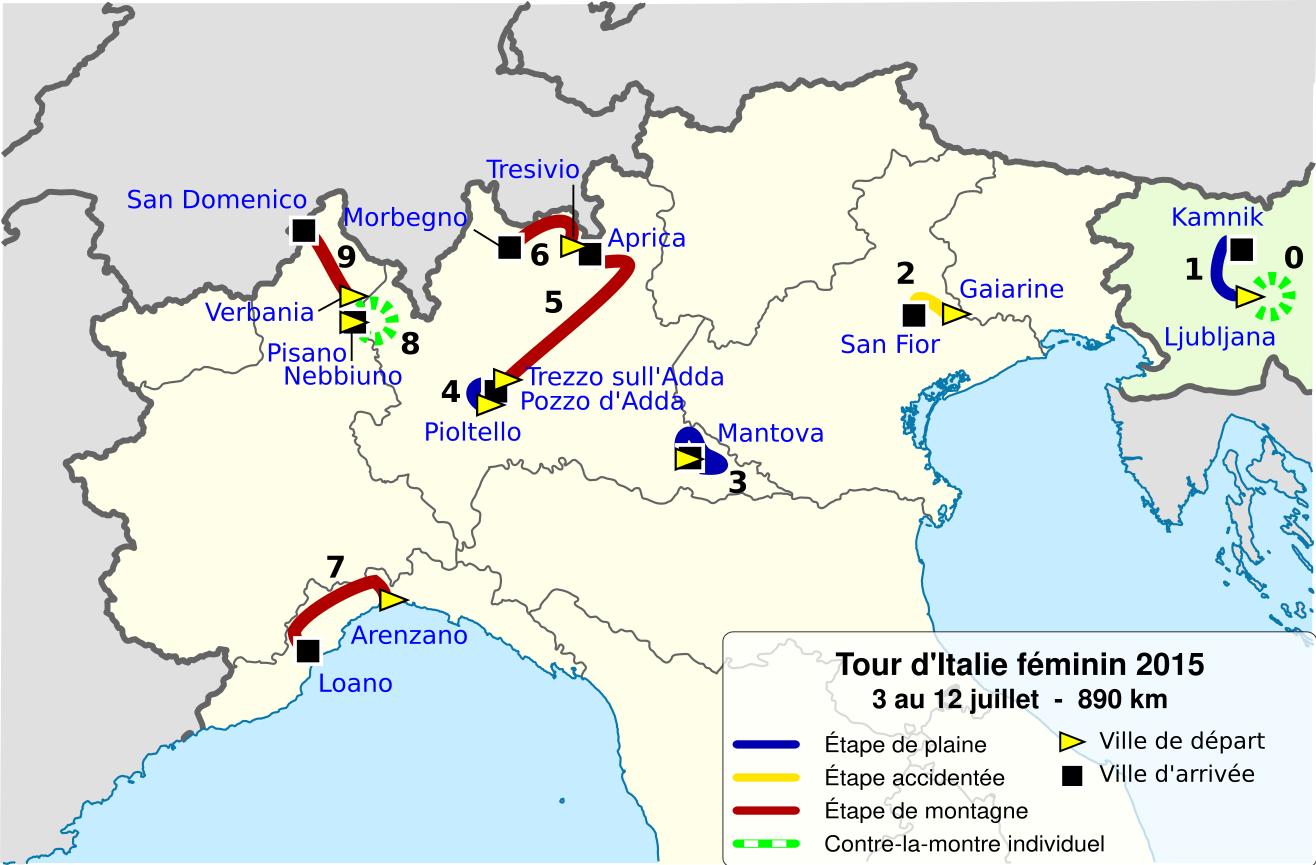

Race details
- Dates: 3–12 July
- Stages: 10 (including prologue)
- Distance: 913.68 km (567.73 mi)
- Winning time: 24h 15' 08"

Results
| Jersey awarded to the overall winner | Winner | Anna van der Breggen (NED) | (Rabobank-Liv Woman Cycling Team) |
| | Second | Mara Abbott (USA) | (Wiggle–Honda) |
| | Third | Megan Guarnier (USA) | (Boels–Dolmans) |
| Jersey awarded to the points classification winner | Points | Megan Guarnier (USA) | (Boels–Dolmans) |
| Jersey awarded to the mountains classification winner | Mountains | Flávia Oliveira (BRA) | (Alé–Cipollini) |
| Jersey awarded to the youth classification winner | Youth | Katarzyna Niewiadoma (POL) | (Rabobank-Liv Woman Cycling Team) |

The 2015 Giro d'Italia Femminile, or 2015 Giro Rosa, was the 26th running of the Giro d'Italia Femminile, the only remaining women's Grand Tour and the most prestigious stage race on the 2015 women's road cycling calendar. It was held between 3 and 12 July 2015 over ten stages, which contained the customary high mountain stages, a prologue held in Slovenia, as well as an individual time trial during the final week.

== Stages ==
=== Prologue ===
3 July 2015 – Ljubljana (Slovenia) to Ljubljana (Slovenia), 2.28 km (1.4 mi), individual time trial (ITT)

Prologue result and general classification after Prologue
| Rank | Rider | Team | Time |
|---|---|---|---|
| 1 | Annemiek van Vleuten (NED) | Bigla Pro Cycling Team | 2' 48" |
| 2 | Lucinda Brand (NED) | Rabobank-Liv Woman Cycling Team | + 1" |
| 3 | Roxane Knetemann (NED) | Rabobank-Liv Woman Cycling Team | + 1" |
| 4 | Anna van der Breggen (NED) | Rabobank-Liv Woman Cycling Team | + 2" |
| 5 | Ellen van Dijk (NED) | Boels–Dolmans | + 3" |
| 6 | Ashleigh Moolman (RSA) | Bigla Pro Cycling Team | + 3" |
| 7 | Valentina Scandolara (ITA) | Orica–AIS | + 3" |
| 8 | Megan Guarnier (USA) | Boels–Dolmans | + 4" |
| 9 | Tiffany Cromwell (AUS) | Velocio–SRAM | + 6" |
| 10 | Chantal Blaak (NED) | Boels–Dolmans | + 6" |

=== Stage 1 ===
4 July 2015 – Kamnik (Slovenia) to Ljubljana (Slovenia), 100.9 km (62.7 mi)

Stage 1 result
| Rank | Rider | Team | Time |
|---|---|---|---|
| 1 | Barbara Guarischi (ITA) | Velocio–SRAM | 2h 32' 23" |
| 2 | Lucinda Brand (NED) | Rabobank-Liv Woman Cycling Team | + 0" |
| 3 | Tiffany Cromwell (AUS) | Velocio–SRAM | + 0" |
| 4 | Elena Cecchini (ITA) | Lotto–Soudal Ladies | + 0" |
| 5 | Floortje Mackaij (NED) | Team Liv–Plantur | + 0" |
| 6 | Giorgia Bronzini (ITA) | Wiggle–Honda | + 0" |
| 7 | Annalisa Cucinotta (ITA) | Alé–Cipollini | + 0" |
| 8 | Anna Zita Maria Stricker (ITA) | Inpa Sottoli Giusfredi | + 0" |
| 9 | Mia Radotić (CRO) | BTC City Ljubljana | + 0" |
| 10 | Anna Trevisi (ITA) | Inpa Sottoli Giusfredi | + 0" |

General classification after stage 1
| Rank | Rider | Team | Time |
|---|---|---|---|
| 1 | Lucinda Brand (NED) | Rabobank-Liv Woman Cycling Team | 2h 35' 06" |
| 2 | Barbara Guarischi (ITA) | Velocio–SRAM | + 4" |
| 3 | Annemiek van Vleuten (NED) | Bigla Pro Cycling Team | + 5" |
| 4 | Roxane Knetemann (NED) | Rabobank-Liv Woman Cycling Team | + 6" |
| 5 | Tiffany Cromwell (AUS) | Velocio–SRAM | + 7" |
| 6 | Anna van der Breggen (NED) | Rabobank-Liv Woman Cycling Team | + 7" |
| 7 | Ellen van Dijk (NED) | Boels–Dolmans | + 8" |
| 8 | Ashleigh Moolman (RSA) | Bigla Pro Cycling Team | + 8" |
| 9 | Valentina Scandolara (ITA) | Orica–AIS | + 8" |
| 10 | Megan Guarnier (USA) | Boels–Dolmans | + 9" |

=== Stage 2 ===
5 July 2015 – Gaiarine to San Fior, 123 km (76.4 mi)

Stage 2 result
| Rank | Rider | Team | Time |
|---|---|---|---|
| 1 | Megan Guarnier (USA) | Boels–Dolmans | 3h 12' 44" |
| 2 | Anna van der Breggen (NED) | Rabobank-Liv Woman Cycling Team | + 0" |
| 3 | Ashleigh Moolman (RSA) | Bigla Pro Cycling Team | + 0" |
| 4 | Elisa Longo Borghini (ITA) | Wiggle–Honda | + 0" |
| 5 | Karol-Ann Canuel (CAN) | Velocio–SRAM | + 2" |
| 6 | Evelyn Stevens (USA) | Boels–Dolmans | + 2" |
| 7 | Katarzyna Niewiadoma (POL) | Rabobank-Liv Woman Cycling Team | + 2" |
| 8 | Mara Abbott (USA) | Wiggle–Honda | + 6" |
| 9 | Eugenia Bujak (POL) | BTC City Ljubljana | + 1' 44" |
| 10 | Rachel Neylan (AUS) | Orica–AIS | + 1' 47" |

General classification after stage 2
| Rank | Rider | Team | Time |
|---|---|---|---|
| 1 | Megan Guarnier (USA) | Boels–Dolmans | 5h 47' 49" |
| 2 | Anna van der Breggen (NED) | Rabobank-Liv Woman Cycling Team | + 2" |
| 3 | Ashleigh Moolman (RSA) | Bigla Pro Cycling Team | + 5" |
| 4 | Elisa Longo Borghini (ITA) | Wiggle–Honda | + 13" |
| 5 | Evelyn Stevens (USA) | Boels–Dolmans | + 15" |
| 6 | Katarzyna Niewiadoma (POL) | Rabobank-Liv Woman Cycling Team | + 17" |
| 7 | Karol-Ann Canuel (CAN) | Velocio–SRAM | + 24" |
| 8 | Mara Abbott (USA) | Wiggle–Honda | + 37" |
| 9 | Lucinda Brand (NED) | Rabobank-Liv Woman Cycling Team | + 1' 40" |
| 10 | Annemiek van Vleuten (NED) | Bigla Pro Cycling Team | + 1' 53" |

=== Stage 3 ===
6 July 2015 – Curtatone to Mantua, 136 km (84.5 mi)

Stage 3 result
| Rank | Rider | Team | Time |
|---|---|---|---|
| 1 | Lucinda Brand (NED) | Rabobank-Liv Woman Cycling Team | 3h 17' 57" |
| 2 | Valentina Scandolara (ITA) | Orica–AIS | + 0" |
| 3 | Elena Cecchini (ITA) | Lotto–Soudal Ladies | + 0" |
| 4 | Loren Rowney (AUS) | Velocio–SRAM | + 0" |
| 5 | Mayuko Hagiwara (JPN) | Wiggle–Honda | + 0" |
| 6 | Daiva Tušlaitė (LTU) | Inpa Sottoli Giusfredi | + 0" |
| 7 | Małgorzata Jasińska (POL) | Alé–Cipollini | + 0" |
| 8 | Claudia Lichtenberg (GER) | Team Liv–Plantur | + 0" |
| 9 | Chiara Pierobon (ITA) | Top Girls Fassa Bortolo | + 10" |
| 10 | Annalisa Cucinotta (ITA) | Alé–Cipollini | + 1' 15" |

General classification after stage 3
| Rank | Rider | Team | Time |
|---|---|---|---|
| 1 | Megan Guarnier (USA) | Boels–Dolmans | 9h 07' 01" |
| 2 | Anna van der Breggen (NED) | Rabobank-Liv Woman Cycling Team | + 2" |
| 3 | Ashleigh Moolman (RSA) | Bigla Pro Cycling Team | + 5" |
| 4 | Lucinda Brand (NED) | Rabobank-Liv Woman Cycling Team | + 12" |
| 5 | Elisa Longo Borghini (ITA) | Wiggle–Honda | + 13" |
| 6 | Evelyn Stevens (USA) | Boels–Dolmans | + 15" |
| 7 | Katarzyna Niewiadoma (POL) | Rabobank-Liv Woman Cycling Team | + 17" |
| 8 | Karol-Ann Canuel (CAN) | Velocio–SRAM | + 24" |
| 9 | Mara Abbott (USA) | Wiggle–Honda | + 37" |
| 10 | Elena Cecchini (ITA) | Lotto–Soudal Ladies | + 43" |

=== Stage 4 ===
7 July 2015 – Pioltello to Pozzo d'Adda, 113 km (70.2 mi)

Stage 4 result
| Rank | Rider | Team | Time |
|---|---|---|---|
| 1 | Annalisa Cucinotta (ITA) | Alé–Cipollini | 2h 46' 44" |
| 2 | Marta Bastianelli (ITA) | Aromitalia Vaiano | + 0" |
| 3 | Elena Cecchini (ITA) | Lotto–Soudal Ladies | + 0" |
| 4 | Tiffany Cromwell (AUS) | Velocio–SRAM | + 0" |
| 5 | Ilaria Sanguineti (ITA) | BePink–La Classica | + 0" |
| 6 | Barbara Guarischi (ITA) | Velocio–SRAM | + 0" |
| 7 | Megan Guarnier (USA) | Boels–Dolmans | + 0" |
| 8 | Lucinda Brand (NED) | Rabobank-Liv Woman Cycling Team | + 0" |
| 9 | Anna Zita Maria Stricker (ITA) | Inpa Sottoli Giusfredi | + 0" |
| 10 | Lizzie Williams (AUS) | Orica–AIS | + 0" |

General classification after stage 4
| Rank | Rider | Team | Time |
|---|---|---|---|
| 1 | Megan Guarnier (USA) | Boels–Dolmans | 11h 53' 45" |
| 2 | Anna van der Breggen (NED) | Rabobank-Liv Woman Cycling Team | + 2" |
| 3 | Ashleigh Moolman (RSA) | Bigla Pro Cycling Team | + 5" |
| 4 | Lucinda Brand (NED) | Rabobank-Liv Woman Cycling Team | + 12" |
| 5 | Elisa Longo Borghini (ITA) | Wiggle–Honda | + 13" |
| 6 | Evelyn Stevens (USA) | Boels–Dolmans | + 15" |
| 7 | Katarzyna Niewiadoma (POL) | Rabobank-Liv Woman Cycling Team | + 17" |
| 8 | Karol-Ann Canuel (CAN) | Velocio–SRAM | + 24" |
| 9 | Mara Abbott (USA) | Wiggle–Honda | + 37" |
| 10 | Elena Cecchini (ITA) | Lotto–Soudal Ladies | + 39" |

=== Stage 5 ===
8 July 2015 – Trezzo sull'Adda to Aprica, 131.4 km (81.6 mi)

Stage 5 marked the first summit finish of the race, with a 15-kilometre (9.3-mile) climb up to the ski resort at Aprica. The average gradient of the climb was 3% with some sections over 10%.

Stage 5 result
| Rank | Rider | Team | Time |
|---|---|---|---|
| 1 | Pauline Ferrand-Prévot (FRA) | Rabobank-Liv Woman Cycling Team | 3h 16' 28" |
| 2 | Megan Guarnier (USA) | Boels–Dolmans | + 1" |
| 3 | Anna van der Breggen (NED) | Rabobank-Liv Woman Cycling Team | + 1" |
| 4 | Katarzyna Niewiadoma (POL) | Rabobank-Liv Woman Cycling Team | + 1" |
| 5 | Ashleigh Moolman (RSA) | Bigla Pro Cycling Team | + 1" |
| 6 | Alena Amialiusik (BLR) | Velocio–SRAM | + 1" |
| 7 | Lucinda Brand (NED) | Rabobank-Liv Woman Cycling Team | + 1" |
| 8 | Sabrina Stultiens (NED) | Team Liv–Plantur | + 1" |
| 9 | Thalita de Jong (NED) | Rabobank-Liv Woman Cycling Team | + 1" |
| 10 | Flávia Oliveira (BRA) | Alé–Cipollini | + 1" |

General classification after stage 5
| Rank | Rider | Team | Time |
|---|---|---|---|
| 1 | Megan Guarnier (USA) | Boels–Dolmans | 15h 10' 07" |
| 2 | Anna van der Breggen (NED) | Rabobank-Liv Woman Cycling Team | + 5" |
| 3 | Ashleigh Moolman (RSA) | Bigla Pro Cycling Team | + 12" |
| 4 | Lucinda Brand (NED) | Rabobank-Liv Woman Cycling Team | + 19" |
| 5 | Elisa Longo Borghini (ITA) | Wiggle–Honda | + 20" |
| 6 | Evelyn Stevens (USA) | Boels–Dolmans | + 22" |
| 7 | Katarzyna Niewiadoma (POL) | Rabobank-Liv Woman Cycling Team | + 24" |
| 8 | Karol-Ann Canuel (CAN) | Velocio–SRAM | + 31" |
| 9 | Mara Abbott (USA) | Wiggle–Honda | + 44" |
| 10 | Elena Cecchini (ITA) | Lotto–Soudal Ladies | + 46" |

=== Stage 6 ===
9 July 2015 – Tresivio to Morbegno, 103.8 km (64.5 mi)

Stage 6 result
| Rank | Rider | Team | Time |
|---|---|---|---|
| 1 | Mayuko Hagiwara (JPN) | Wiggle–Honda | 3h 12' 26" |
| 2 | Megan Guarnier (USA) | Boels–Dolmans | + 24" |
| 3 | Ashleigh Moolman (RSA) | Bigla Pro Cycling Team | + 24" |
| 4 | Anna van der Breggen (NED) | Rabobank-Liv Woman Cycling Team | + 24" |
| 5 | Katarzyna Niewiadoma (POL) | Rabobank-Liv Woman Cycling Team | + 24" |
| 6 | Evelyn Stevens (USA) | Boels–Dolmans | + 24" |
| 7 | Elisa Longo Borghini (ITA) | Wiggle–Honda | + 24" |
| 8 | Flávia Oliveira (BRA) | Alé–Cipollini | + 24" |
| 9 | Pauline Ferrand-Prévot (FRA) | Rabobank-Liv Woman Cycling Team | + 24" |
| 10 | Shara Gillow (AUS) | Rabobank-Liv Woman Cycling Team | + 27" |

General classification after stage 6
| Rank | Rider | Team | Time |
|---|---|---|---|
| 1 | Megan Guarnier (USA) | Boels–Dolmans | 18h 22' 51" |
| 2 | Anna van der Breggen (NED) | Rabobank-Liv Woman Cycling Team | + 11" |
| 3 | Ashleigh Moolman (RSA) | Bigla Pro Cycling Team | + 14" |
| 4 | Elisa Longo Borghini (ITA) | Wiggle–Honda | + 25" |
| 5 | Evelyn Stevens (USA) | Boels–Dolmans | + 28" |
| 6 | Katarzyna Niewiadoma (POL) | Rabobank-Liv Woman Cycling Team | + 30" |
| 7 | Mayuko Hagiwara (JPN) | Wiggle–Honda | + 33" |
| 8 | Mara Abbott (USA) | Wiggle–Honda | + 53" |
| 9 | Pauline Ferrand-Prévot (FRA) | Rabobank-Liv Woman Cycling Team | + 2' 01" |
| 10 | Roxane Knetemann (NED) | Rabobank-Liv Woman Cycling Team | + 2' 14" |

=== Stage 7 ===
10 July 2015 – Arenzano to Loano, 90.4 km (56.2 mi)

The seventh stage of the race was the queen stage, as it took the riders up through the climbs of Naso di Gatto and the Colle del Melogno.

Stage 7 result
| Rank | Rider | Team | Time |
|---|---|---|---|
| 1 | Lucinda Brand (NED) | Rabobank-Liv Woman Cycling Team | 2h 38' 15" |
| 2 | Megan Guarnier (USA) | Boels–Dolmans | + 2' 41" |
| 3 | Ashleigh Moolman (RSA) | Bigla Pro Cycling Team | + 2' 41" |
| 4 | Katarzyna Niewiadoma (POL) | Rabobank-Liv Woman Cycling Team | + 2' 41" |
| 5 | Elisa Longo Borghini (ITA) | Wiggle–Honda | + 2' 41" |
| 6 | Anna van der Breggen (NED) | Rabobank-Liv Woman Cycling Team | + 2' 41" |
| 7 | Mara Abbott (USA) | Wiggle–Honda | + 2' 43" |
| 8 | Pauline Ferrand-Prévot (FRA) | Rabobank-Liv Woman Cycling Team | + 4' 30" |
| 9 | Roxane Knetemann (NED) | Rabobank-Liv Woman Cycling Team | + 4' 30" |
| 10 | Claudia Lichtenberg (GER) | Team Liv–Plantur | + 4' 30" |

General classification after stage 7
| Rank | Rider | Team | Time |
|---|---|---|---|
| 1 | Megan Guarnier (USA) | Boels–Dolmans | 21h 03' 41" |
| 2 | Ashleigh Moolman (RSA) | Bigla Pro Cycling Team | + 16" |
| 3 | Anna van der Breggen (NED) | Rabobank-Liv Woman Cycling Team | + 17" |
| 4 | Elisa Longo Borghini (ITA) | Wiggle–Honda | + 31" |
| 5 | Katarzyna Niewiadoma (POL) | Rabobank-Liv Woman Cycling Team | + 36" |
| 6 | Mara Abbott (USA) | Wiggle–Honda | + 1' 01" |
| 7 | Evelyn Stevens (USA) | Boels–Dolmans | + 2' 23" |
| 8 | Pauline Ferrand-Prévot (FRA) | Rabobank-Liv Woman Cycling Team | + 3' 56" |
| 9 | Roxane Knetemann (NED) | Rabobank-Liv Woman Cycling Team | + 4' 09" |
| 10 | Shara Gillow (AUS) | Rabobank-Liv Woman Cycling Team | + 4' 12" |

=== Stage 8 ===
11 July 2015 – Pisano to Nebbiuno, 21.7 km (13.5 mi), individual time trial (ITT)

The riders tackled the 21.7-kilometre (13.5-mile) stage, starting in the region of Vergante, Piedmont. The route was described as containing technical and rolling terrain, concluding in a 4-kilometre (2.5-mile) climb to Comnago.

Stage 8 result
| Rank | Rider | Team | Time |
|---|---|---|---|
| 1 | Anna van der Breggen (NED) | Rabobank-Liv Woman Cycling Team | 36' 05" |
| 2 | Megan Guarnier (USA) | Boels–Dolmans | + 1' 03" |
| 3 | Ashleigh Moolman (RSA) | Bigla Pro Cycling Team | + 1' 16" |
| 4 | Katrin Garfoot (AUS) | Orica–AIS | + 1' 17" |
| 5 | Katarzyna Niewiadoma (POL) | Rabobank-Liv Woman Cycling Team | + 1' 27" |
| 6 | Karol-Ann Canuel (CAN) | Velocio–SRAM | + 1' 31" |
| 7 | Mara Abbott (USA) | Wiggle–Honda | + 1' 45" |
| 8 | Evelyn Stevens (USA) | Boels–Dolmans | + 1' 46" |
| 9 | Pauline Ferrand-Prévot (FRA) | Rabobank-Liv Woman Cycling Team | + 1' 53" |
| 10 | Lucinda Brand (NED) | Rabobank-Liv Woman Cycling Team | + 2' 01" |

General classification after stage 8
| Rank | Rider | Team | Time |
|---|---|---|---|
| 1 | Anna van der Breggen (NED) | Rabobank-Liv Woman Cycling Team | 21h 40' 03" |
| 2 | Megan Guarnier (USA) | Boels–Dolmans | + 46" |
| 3 | Ashleigh Moolman (RSA) | Bigla Pro Cycling Team | + 1' 15" |
| 4 | Katarzyna Niewiadoma (POL) | Rabobank-Liv Woman Cycling Team | + 1' 46" |
| 5 | Mara Abbott (USA) | Wiggle–Honda | + 2' 29" |
| 6 | Elisa Longo Borghini (ITA) | Wiggle–Honda | + 3' 01" |
| 7 | Evelyn Stevens (USA) | Boels–Dolmans | + 3' 52" |
| 8 | Pauline Ferrand-Prévot (FRA) | Rabobank-Liv Woman Cycling Team | + 5' 32" |
| 9 | Shara Gillow (AUS) | Rabobank-Liv Woman Cycling Team | + 6' 08" |
| 10 | Roxane Knetemann (NED) | Rabobank-Liv Woman Cycling Team | + 6' 23" |

=== Stage 9 ===
12 July 2015 – Verbania to San Domenico di Varzo, 91.2 km (56.7 mi)

Stage 9 result
| Rank | Rider | Team | Time |
|---|---|---|---|
| 1 | Mara Abbott (USA) | Wiggle–Honda | 2h 34' 16" |
| 2 | Anna van der Breggen (NED) | Rabobank-Liv Woman Cycling Team | + 55" |
| 3 | Flávia Oliveira (BRA) | Alé–Cipollini | + 1' 13" |
| 4 | Megan Guarnier (USA) | Boels–Dolmans | + 1' 46" |
| 5 | Ashleigh Moolman (RSA) | Bigla Pro Cycling Team | + 1' 46" |
| 6 | Francesca Cauz (ITA) | Alé–Cipollini | + 1' 55" |
| 7 | Katarzyna Niewiadoma (POL) | Rabobank-Liv Woman Cycling Team | + 2' 14" |
| 8 | Pauline Ferrand-Prévot (FRA) | Rabobank-Liv Woman Cycling Team | + 2' 14" |
| 9 | Tetyana Ryabchenko (UKR) | Inpa Sottoli Giusfredi | + 3' 12" |
| 10 | Claudia Lichtenberg (GER) | Team Liv–Plantur | + 4' 35" |

Final general classification
| Rank | Rider | Team | Time |
|---|---|---|---|
| 1 | Anna van der Breggen (NED) | Rabobank-Liv Woman Cycling Team | 24h 15' 08" |
| 2 | Mara Abbott (USA) | Wiggle–Honda | + 1' 30" |
| 3 | Megan Guarnier (USA) | Boels–Dolmans | + 1' 43" |
| 4 | Ashleigh Moolman (RSA) | Bigla Pro Cycling Team | + 2' 12" |
| 5 | Katarzyna Niewiadoma (POL) | Rabobank-Liv Woman Cycling Team | + 3' 11" |
| 6 | Pauline Ferrand-Prévot (FRA) | Rabobank-Liv Woman Cycling Team | + 6' 57" |
| 7 | Flávia Oliveira (BRA) | Alé–Cipollini | + 7' 35" |
| 8 | Elisa Longo Borghini (ITA) | Wiggle–Honda | + 8' 17" |
| 9 | Evelyn Stevens (USA) | Boels–Dolmans | + 9' 08" |
| 10 | Shara Gillow (AUS) | Rabobank-Liv Woman Cycling Team | + 10' 07" |

== Classification leadership ==
| Stage | Winner | General classification | Points classification | Mountains classification | Young rider classification | Italian rider classification |
|---|---|---|---|---|---|---|
| P | Annemiek van Vleuten | Annemiek van Vleuten | Annemiek van Vleuten | Not awarded | Pauline Ferrand-Prévot | Valentina Scandolara |
| 1 | Barbara Guarischi | Lucinda Brand | Lucinda Brand | Małgorzata Jasińska | Pauline Ferrand-Prévot | Barbara Guarischi |
| 2 | Megan Guarnier | Megan Guarnier | Lucinda Brand | Carlee Taylor | Katarzyna Niewiadoma | Elisa Longo Borghini |
| 3 | Lucinda Brand | Megan Guarnier | Lucinda Brand | Carlee Taylor | Katarzyna Niewiadoma | Elisa Longo Borghini |
| 4 | Annalisa Cucinotta | Megan Guarnier | Lucinda Brand | Carlee Taylor | Katarzyna Niewiadoma | Elisa Longo Borghini |
| 5 | Pauline Ferrand-Prévot | Megan Guarnier | Lucinda Brand | Carlee Taylor | Katarzyna Niewiadoma | Elisa Longo Borghini |
| 6 | Mayuko Hagiwara | Megan Guarnier | Megan Guarnier | Flávia Oliveira | Katarzyna Niewiadoma | Elisa Longo Borghini |
| 7 | Lucinda Brand | Megan Guarnier | Lucinda Brand | Flávia Oliveira | Katarzyna Niewiadoma | Elisa Longo Borghini |
| 8 | Anna van der Breggen | Anna van der Breggen | Megan Guarnier | Flávia Oliveira | Katarzyna Niewiadoma | Elisa Longo Borghini |
| 9 | Mara Abbott | Anna van der Breggen | Megan Guarnier | Flávia Oliveira | Katarzyna Niewiadoma | Elisa Longo Borghini |
| Final | | Anna van der Breggen | Megan Guarnier | Flávia Oliveira | Katarzyna Niewiadoma | Elisa Longo Borghini |

== See also ==
- 2015 in women's road cycling
