= 2018 Giro Rosa =

2018 UCI Women's World Tour, race 14 of 24
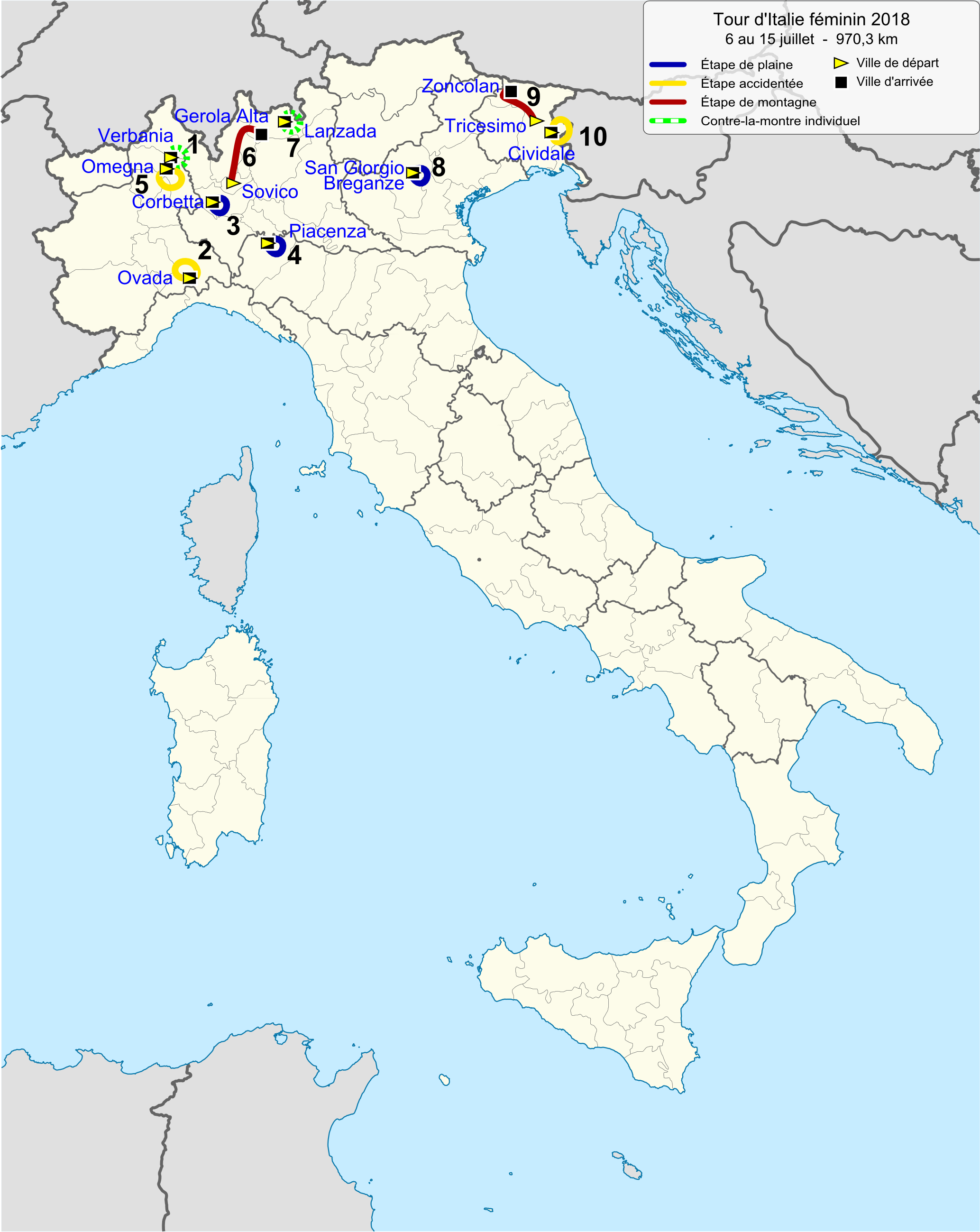
- Route of the 2018 Giro Rosa

Race details
- Dates: 6–15 July 2018
- Stages: 10
- Distance: 975.2 km (606.0 mi)
- Winning time: 25h 50' 22"

Results
Jersey awarded to the overall winner	Winner	Annemiek van Vleuten (Netherlands)	(Mitchelton–Scott)
	Second	Ashleigh Moolman (South Africa)	(Cervélo–Bigla Pro Cycling)
	Third	Amanda Spratt (Australia)	(Mitchelton–Scott)
Jersey awarded to the points classification winner	Points	Annemiek van Vleuten (Netherlands)	(Mitchelton–Scott)
Jersey awarded to the mountains classification winner	Mountains	Amanda Spratt (Australia)	(Mitchelton–Scott)
Jersey awarded to the youth classification winner	Youth	Sofia Bertizzolo (Italy)	(Astana Women's Team)
Jersey awarded to the team classification winner	Team	Team Sunweb	

The 29th running of the women's Giro d'Italia, or Giro Rosa, was held from 6 to 15 July 2018. Raced over ten stages, it is considered the most prestigious stage race of the women's calendar. It was the 14th event of the 2018 UCI Women's World Tour. Two-time winner Anna van der Breggen was the defending champion. However she elected not to defend her title, choosing instead to focus on preparing for a bid to win her first title at the Road World Championships.

== Teams ==
The 24 UCI Women's Team competing and associated dossard numbers.

N.	Wiki Code	Squadra
1-7	DLT	(Netherlands) Boels–Dolmans Cycling Team
11-17	ALE	(Italy) Alé–Cipollini
21-27	VAI	(Italy) Aromitalia Vaiano
31-37	ASA2	(Kazakhstan) Astana Women's Team
41-47	BPK	(Italy) BePink Cogeas
51-57	BDM	(Spain) Bizkaia Durango–Euskadi Murias
61-67	BTC	(Slovenia) BTC City Ljubljana
71-77	LPR2	(Germany) Canyon–SRAM
81-87	CBT	(Denmark) Cervélo–Bigla
91-97	CZG	(Albania) Conceria Zabri-Fanini-Guerciotti
101-107	CPC	(United States) Cylance
111-117	SBT	(Italy) Eurotarget–Bianchi–Vitasana

N.	Wiki Code	Squadra
121-127	FUT	(France) FDJ Nouvelle-Aquitaine Futuroscope
131-137	MOV2	(Spain) Movistar Women
141-147	MTS	(Australia) Mitchelton–Scott
151-157	MIC	(Italy) S.C. Michela Fanini Rox
161-167	SER	(Italy) Servetto–Stradalli Cycle–Alurecycling
171-177	GIW	(Netherlands) Team Sunweb
181-187	TVW	(Denmark) Virtu Cycling Women
191-197	TOG	(Italy) Top Girls Fassa Bortolo
201-207	DRP	(United Kingdom) Trek-Drops
211-217	VAL	(Italy) Valcar-PBM
221-227	WM3	(Netherlands) WaowDeals
231-237	WHT	(United Kingdom) Wiggle High5

== Route ==
Stage schedule
Stage	Date	Course	Distance	Type	Winner
1	6 July	Verbania to Verbania	15.5 km (9.6 mi)	Team time trial	Team Sunweb
2	7 July	Ovada to Ovada	120.4 km (74.8 mi)	Hilly stage	Kirsten Wild (NED)
3	8 July	Corbetta to Corbetta	132 km (82.0 mi)	Flat stage	Jolien D'Hoore (BEL)
4	9 July	Piacenza to Piacenza	109 km (67.7 mi)	Flat stage	Jolien D'Hoore (BEL)
5	10 July	Omegna to Omegna	122.6 km (76.2 mi)	Hilly stage	Ruth Winder (USA)
6	11 July	Sovico to Gerola Alta	114.1 km (70.9 mi)	Mountain stage	Amanda Spratt (AUS)
7	12 July	Lanzada to Lanzada	15 km (9.3 mi)	Individual time trial	Annemiek van Vleuten (NED)
8	13 July	San Giorgio to Breganze	121.6 km (75.6 mi)	Plain stage	Marianne Vos (NED)
9	14 July	Tricesimo to Monte Zoncolan	104.7 km (65.1 mi)	Mountain stage	Annemiek van Vleuten (NED)
10	15 July	Cividale del Friuli to Cividale del Friuli	120.3 km (74.8 mi)	Hilly stage	Annemiek van Vleuten (NED)

== UCI World Tour ==
=== Attributed points ===
Position	1st	2nd	3rd	4th	5th	6th	7th	8th	9th	10th	11th	12th	13th	14th	15th	16-30th	31-40th
General classification	200	150	125	100	85	70	60	50	40	35	30	25	20	15	10	5	3
Stages	25	20	18	16	14	12	10	8	6	4
Leader's jersey	5

== Stages ==
=== Stage 1 ===
6 July 2018 — Verbania to Verbania, 15.5 km (9.6 mi), team time trial (TTT)

Result of Stage 1
Rank	Team	Time
1	Team Sunweb	18' 24"
2	Mitchelton–Scott	+ 1"
3	Boels–Dolmans	+ 12"
4	Cervélo–Bigla Pro Cycling	+ 22"
5	Canyon//SRAM	+ 26"
6	WaowDeals Pro Cycling	+ 35"
7	Wiggle High5	+ 39"
8	Movistar Team	+ 1' 11"
9	FDJ Nouvelle-Aquitaine Futuroscope	+ 1' 13"
10	Trek–Drops	+ 1' 18"

General classification after Stage 1
Rank	Rider	Team	Time
1	Ellen van Dijk (NED)	Team Sunweb	18' 24"
2	Liane Lippert (GER)	Team Sunweb	+ 0"
3	Juliette Labous (FRA)	Team Sunweb	+ 0"
4	Julia Soek (NED)	Team Sunweb	+ 0"
5	Leah Kirchmann (CAN)	Team Sunweb	+ 0"
6	Lucinda Brand (NED)	Team Sunweb	+ 0"
7	Ruth Winder (USA)	Team Sunweb	+ 0"
8	Sarah Roy (AUS)	Mitchelton–Scott	+ 1"
9	Gracie Elvin (AUS)	Mitchelton–Scott	+ 1"
10	Annemiek van Vleuten (NED)	Mitchelton–Scott	+ 1"

=== Stage 2 ===
7 July 2018 — Ovada to Ovada, 120.4 km (74.8 mi)

Result of Stage 2
Rank	Rider	Team	Time
1	Kirsten Wild (NED)	Wiggle High5	3h 22' 0"
2	Giorgia Bronzini (ITA)	Cylance Pro Cycling	+ 0"
3	Marianne Vos (NED)	WaowDeals Pro Cycling	+ 0"
4	Marta Bastianelli (ITA)	Alé–Cipollini	+ 0"
5	Amy Pieters (NED)	Boels–Dolmans	+ 0"
6	Alexis Ryan (USA)	Canyon//SRAM	+ 0"
7	Ilaria Sanguineti (ITA)	Valcar–PBM	+ 0"
8	Roxane Fournier (FRA)	FDJ Nouvelle-Aquitaine Futuroscope	+ 0"
9	Amanda Spratt (AUS)	Mitchelton–Scott	+ 0"
10	Lucinda Brand (NED)	Team Sunweb	+ 0"

General classification after Stage 2
Rank	Rider	Team	Time
1	Lucinda Brand (NED)	Team Sunweb	3h 40' 22"
2	Leah Kirchmann (CAN)	Team Sunweb	+ 0"
3	Ellen van Dijk (NED)	Team Sunweb	+ 3"
4	Ruth Winder (USA)	Team Sunweb	+ 3"
5	Juliette Labous (FRA)	Team Sunweb	+ 3"
6	Liane Lippert (GER)	Team Sunweb	+ 3"
7	Julia Soek (NED)	Team Sunweb	+ 3"
8	Amanda Spratt (AUS)	Mitchelton–Scott	+ 4"
9	Gracie Elvin (AUS)	Mitchelton–Scott	+ 4"
10	Annemiek van Vleuten (NED)	Mitchelton–Scott	+ 4"

=== Stage 3 ===
8 July 2018 — Corbetta to Corbetta, 132 km (82.0 mi)

Result of Stage 3
Rank	Rider	Team	Time
1	Jolien D'Hoore (BEL)	Mitchelton–Scott	3h 15' 47"
2	Kirsten Wild (NED)	Wiggle High5	+ 0"
3	Alexis Ryan (USA)	Canyon//SRAM	+ 0"
4	Leah Kirchmann (CAN)	Team Sunweb	+ 0"
5	Giorgia Bronzini (ITA)	Cylance Pro Cycling	+ 0"
6	Marianne Vos (NED)	WaowDeals Pro Cycling	+ 0"
7	Barbara Guarischi (ITA)	Team Virtu Cycling	+ 0"
8	Amy Pieters (NED)	Boels–Dolmans	+ 0"
9	Chiara Consonni (ITA)	Valcar–PBM	+ 0"
10	Lotta Lepisto (FIN)	Cervélo–Bigla Pro Cycling	+ 0"

General classification after Stage 3
Rank	Rider	Team	Time
1	Leah Kirchmann (CAN)	Team Sunweb	6h 56' 07"
2	Lucinda Brand (NED)	Team Sunweb	+ 5"
3	Ellen van Dijk (NED)	Team Sunweb	+ 9"
4	Ruth Winder (USA)	Team Sunweb	+ 9"
5	Amanda Spratt (AUS)	Mitchelton–Scott	+ 10"
6	Annemiek van Vleuten (NED)	Mitchelton–Scott	+ 10"
7	Gracie Elvin (AUS)	Mitchelton–Scott	+ 10"
8	Amy Pieters (NED)	Boels–Dolmans	+ 17"
9	Chantal Blaak (NED)	Boels–Dolmans	+ 21"
10	Kirsten Wild (NED)	Wiggle High5	+ 25"

=== Stage 4 ===
9 July 2018 — Piacenza to Piacenza, 109 km (67.7 mi)

Result of Stage 4
Rank	Rider	Team	Time
1	Jolien D'Hoore (BEL)	Mitchelton–Scott	2h 42' 25"
2	Marta Bastianelli (ITA)	Alé–Cipollini	+ 0"
3	Lotta Lepisto (FIN)	Cervélo–Bigla Pro Cycling	+ 0"
4	Barbara Guarischi (ITA)	Team Virtu Cycling	+ 0"
5	Leah Kirchmann (CAN)	Team Sunweb	+ 0"
6	Roxane Fournier (FRA)	FDJ Nouvelle-Aquitaine Futuroscope	+ 0"
7	Kirsten Wild (NED)	Wiggle High5	+ 0"
8	Amy Pieters (NED)	Boels–Dolmans	+ 0"
9	Emilia Fahlin (SWE)	Wiggle High5	+ 0"
10	Claudia Koster (NED)	Team Virtu Cycling	+ 0"

General classification after Stage 4
Rank	Rider	Team	Time
1	Leah Kirchmann (CAN)	Team Sunweb	9h 38' 31"
2	Lucinda Brand (NED)	Team Sunweb	+ 6"
3	Ruth Winder (USA)	Team Sunweb	+ 10"
4	Amanda Spratt (AUS)	Mitchelton–Scott	+ 11"
5	Annemiek van Vleuten (NED)	Mitchelton–Scott	+ 11"
6	Gracie Elvin (AUS)	Mitchelton–Scott	+ 11"
7	Ellen van Dijk (NED)	Team Sunweb	+ 17"
8	Amy Pieters (NED)	Boels–Dolmans	+ 18"
9	Lotta Lepisto (FIN)	Cervélo–Bigla Pro Cycling	+ 24"
10	Kirsten Wild (NED)	Wiggle High5	+ 26"

=== Stage 5 ===
10 July 2018 — Omegna to Omegna, 122.6 km (76.2 mi)

Result of Stage 5
Rank	Rider	Team	Time
1	Ruth Winder (USA)	Team Sunweb	3h 01' 06"
2	Tayler Wiles (USA)	Trek–Drops	+ 1"
3	Alice Arzuffi (ITA)	Bizkaia Durango–Euskadi Murias	+ 1"
4	Marianne Vos (NED)	WaowDeals Pro Cycling	+ 1' 17"
5	Megan Guarnier (USA)	Boels–Dolmans	+ 1' 17"
6	Elisa Longo Borghini (ITA)	Wiggle High5	+ 1' 17"
7	Maria Giulia Confalonieri (ITA)	Valcar–PBM	+ 1' 17"
8	Amanda Spratt (AUS)	Mitchelton–Scott	+ 1' 17"
9	Soraya Paladin (ITA)	Alé–Cipollini	+ 1' 17"
10	Nadia Quagliotto (ITA)	Top Girls Fassa Bortolo	+ 1' 17"

General classification after Stage 5
Rank	Rider	Team	Time
1	Ruth Winder (USA)	Team Sunweb	12h 39' 36"
2	Leah Kirchmann (CAN)	Team Sunweb	+ 1' 18"
3	Lucinda Brand (NED)	Team Sunweb	+ 1' 24"
4	Amanda Spratt (AUS)	Mitchelton–Scott	+ 1' 29"
5	Annemiek van Vleuten (NED)	Mitchelton–Scott	+ 1' 29"
6	Ellen van Dijk (NED)	Team Sunweb	+ 1' 35"
7	Lotta Lepisto (FIN)	Cervélo–Bigla Pro Cycling	+ 1' 42"
8	Cecilie Uttrup Ludwig (DEN)	Cervélo–Bigla Pro Cycling	+ 1' 50"
9	Ashleigh Moolman (RSA)	Cervélo–Bigla Pro Cycling	+ 1' 50"
10	Kasia Niewiadoma (POL)	Canyon//SRAM	+ 2' 01"

=== Stage 6 ===
11 July 2018 — Sovico to Gerola Alta, 114.1 km (70.9 mi)

Result of Stage 6
Rank	Rider	Team	Time
1	Amanda Spratt (AUS)	Mitchelton–Scott	2h 57' 49"
2	Annemiek van Vleuten (NED)	Mitchelton–Scott	+ 29"
3	Ashleigh Moolman (RSA)	Cervélo–Bigla Pro Cycling	+ 31"
4	Megan Guarnier (USA)	Boels–Dolmans	+ 32"
5	Ane Santesteban (ESP)	Alé–Cipollini	+ 32"
6	Margarita Victoria Garcia (ESP)	Movistar Team	+ 32"
7	Kasia Niewiadoma (POL)	Canyon//SRAM	+ 34"
8	Sabrina Stultiens (NED)	WaowDeals Pro Cycling	+ 35"
9	Lucinda Brand (NED)	Team Sunweb	+ 35"
10	Cecilie Uttrup Ludwig (DEN)	Cervélo–Bigla Pro Cycling	+ 35"

General classification after Stage 6
Rank	Rider	Team	Time
1	Amanda Spratt (AUS)	Mitchelton–Scott	15h 38' 44"
2	Ruth Winder (USA)	Team Sunweb	+ 30"
3	Annemiek van Vleuten (NED)	Mitchelton–Scott	+ 33"
4	Lucinda Brand (NED)	Team Sunweb	+ 40"
5	Ashleigh Moolman (RSA)	Cervélo–Bigla Pro Cycling	+ 58"
6	Cecilie Uttrup Ludwig (DEN)	Cervélo–Bigla Pro Cycling	+ 1' 06"
7	Kasia Niewiadoma (POL)	Canyon//SRAM	+ 1' 16"
8	Megan Guarnier (USA)	Boels–Dolmans	+ 1' 49"
9	Leah Kirchmann (CAN)	Team Sunweb	+ 2' 08"
10	Sabrina Stultiens (NED)	WaowDeals Pro Cycling	+ 2' 31"

=== Stage 7 ===
12 July 2018 — Lanzada to Lanzada, 15 km (9.3 mi), Individual Time Trial

Result of Stage 7
Rank	Rider	Team	Time
1	Annemiek van Vleuten (NED)	Mitchelton–Scott	46' 07"
2	Ashleigh Moolman (RSA)	Cervélo–Bigla Pro Cycling	+ 2' 28"
3	Lucinda Brand (NED)	Team Sunweb	+ 2' 54"
4	Megan Guarnier (USA)	Boels–Dolmans	+ 3' 15"
5	Amanda Spratt (AUS)	Mitchelton–Scott	+ 3' 26"
6	Elisa Longo Borghini (ITA)	Wiggle High5	+ 3' 28"
7	Kasia Niewiadoma (POL)	Canyon//SRAM	+ 3' 38"
8	Cecilie Uttrup Ludwig (DEN)	Cervélo–Bigla Pro Cycling	+ 4' 06"
9	Alice Arzuffi (ITA)	Bizkaia Durango–Euskadi Murias	+ 4' 17"
10	Tayler Wiles (USA)	Trek–Drops	+ 4' 30"

General classification after Stage 7
Rank	Rider	Team	Time
1	Annemiek van Vleuten (NED)	Mitchelton–Scott	16h 25' 23"
2	Amanda Spratt (AUS)	Mitchelton–Scott	+ 2' 53"
3	Ashleigh Moolman (RSA)	Cervélo–Bigla Pro Cycling	+ 2' 54"
4	Lucinda Brand (NED)	Team Sunweb	+ 3' 01"
5	Kasia Niewiadoma (POL)	Canyon//SRAM	+ 4' 21"
6	Megan Guarnier (USA)	Boels–Dolmans	+ 4' 33"
7	Cecilie Uttrup Ludwig (DEN)	Cervélo–Bigla Pro Cycling	+ 4' 39"
8	Ruth Winder (USA)	Team Sunweb	+ 5' 52"
9	Elisa Longo Borghini (ITA)	Wiggle High5	+ 6' 34"
10	Sabrina Stultiens (NED)	WaowDeals Pro Cycling	+ 6' 36"

=== Stage 8 ===
13 July 2018 — San Giorgio to Breganze, 121.6 km (75.6 mi)

Result of Stage 8
Rank	Rider	Team	Time
1	Marianne Vos (NED)	WaowDeals Pro Cycling	3h 06' 38"
2	Elisa Longo Borghini (ITA)	Wiggle High5	+ 0"
3	Lucinda Brand (NED)	Team Sunweb	+ 0"
4	Giorgia Bronzini (ITA)	Cylance Pro Cycling	+ 23"
5	Soraya Paladin (ITA)	Alé–Cipollini	+ 23"
6	Maria Giulia Confalonieri (ITA)	Valcar–PBM	+ 23"
7	Sofia Bertizzolo (ITA)	Astana	+ 23"
8	Elena Cecchini (ITA)	Canyon//SRAM	+ 23"
9	Nadia Quagliotto (ITA)	Top Girls Fassa Bortolo	+ 23"
10	Eugenia Bujak (SLO)	BTC City Ljubljana	+ 23"

General classification after Stage 8
Rank	Rider	Team	Time
1	Annemiek van Vleuten (NED)	Mitchelton–Scott	19h 32' 24"
2	Lucinda Brand (NED)	Team Sunweb	+ 2' 29"
3	Ashleigh Moolman (RSA)	Cervélo–Bigla Pro Cycling	+ 2' 51"
4	Amanda Spratt (AUS)	Mitchelton–Scott	+ 2' 53"
5	Kasia Niewiadoma (POL)	Canyon//SRAM	+ 4' 21"
6	Megan Guarnier (USA)	Boels–Dolmans	+ 4' 33"
7	Cecilie Uttrup Ludwig (DEN)	Cervélo–Bigla Pro Cycling	+ 4' 59"
8	Ruth Winder (USA)	Team Sunweb	+ 5' 52"
9	Elisa Longo Borghini (ITA)	Wiggle High5	+ 6' 05"
10	Sabrina Stultiens (NED)	WaowDeals Pro Cycling	+ 6' 36"

=== Stage 9 ===
14 July 2018 — Tricesimo to Monte Zoncolan, 104.7 km (65.1 mi)

Result of Stage 9
Rank	Rider	Team	Time
1	Annemiek van Vleuten (NED)	Mitchelton–Scott	3h 17' 54"
2	Ashleigh Moolman (RSA)	Cervélo–Bigla Pro Cycling	+ 40"
3	Amanda Spratt (AUS)	Mitchelton–Scott	+ 2' 54"
4	Eider Merino Cortazar (ESP)	Movistar Team	+ 2' 59"
5	Megan Guarnier (USA)	Boels–Dolmans	+ 4' 00"
6	Lucinda Brand (NED)	Team Sunweb	+ 4' 06"
7	Ane Santesteban (ESP)	Alé–Cipollini	+ 4' 39"
8	Cecilie Uttrup Ludwig (DEN)	Cervélo–Bigla Pro Cycling	+ 4' 52"
9	Margarita Victoria García (ESP)	Movistar Team	+ 5' 16"
10	Katrine Aalerud (NOR)	Team Virtu Cycling	+ 5' 28"

General classification after Stage 9
Rank	Rider	Team	Time
1	Annemiek van Vleuten (NED)	Mitchelton–Scott	22h 50' 08"
2	Ashleigh Moolman (RSA)	Cervélo–Bigla Pro Cycling	+ 3' 35"
3	Amanda Spratt (AUS)	Mitchelton–Scott	+ 5' 53"
4	Lucinda Brand (NED)	Team Sunweb	+ 7' 05"
5	Megan Guarnier (USA)	Boels–Dolmans	+ 8' 43"
6	Cecilie Uttrup Ludwig (DEN)	Cervélo–Bigla Pro Cycling	+ 10' 01"
7	Kasia Niewiadoma (POL)	Canyon//SRAM	+ 10' 13"
8	Eider Merino Cortazar (ESP)	Movistar Team	+ 11' 12"
9	Elisa Longo Borghini (ITA)	Wiggle High5	+ 12' 14"
10	Ane Santesteban (ESP)	Alé–Cipollini	+ 12' 35"

=== Stage 10 ===
15 July 2018 — Cividale del Friuli to Cividale del Friuli, 120.3 km (74.8 mi)

Result of Stage 10
Rank	Rider	Team	Time
1	Annemiek van Vleuten (NED)	Mitchelton–Scott	3h 00' 24"
2	Lucinda Brand (NED)	Team Sunweb	+ 27"
3	Kasia Niewiadoma (POL)	Canyon//SRAM	+ 27"
4	Megan Guarnier (USA)	Boels–Dolmans	+ 27"
5	Margarita Victoria García (ESP)	Movistar Team	+ 27"
6	Amanda Spratt (AUS)	Mitchelton–Scott	+ 27"
7	Ashleigh Moolman (RSA)	Cervélo–Bigla Pro Cycling	+ 27"
8	Cecilie Uttrup Ludwig (DEN)	Cervélo–Bigla Pro Cycling	+ 27"
9	Ane Santesteban (ESP)	Alé–Cipollini	+ 27"
10	Juliette Labous (FRA)	Team Sunweb	+ 1' 14"

General classification after Stage 10
Rank	Rider	Team	Time
1	Annemiek van Vleuten (NED)	Mitchelton–Scott	25h 50' 22"
2	Ashleigh Moolman (RSA)	Cervélo–Bigla Pro Cycling	+ 4' 12"
3	Amanda Spratt (AUS)	Mitchelton–Scott	+ 6' 30"
4	Lucinda Brand (NED)	Team Sunweb	+ 7' 36"
5	Megan Guarnier (USA)	Boels–Dolmans	+ 9' 20"
6	Cecilie Uttrup Ludwig (DEN)	Cervélo–Bigla Pro Cycling	+ 10' 38"
7	Kasia Niewiadoma (POL)	Canyon//SRAM	+ 10' 46"
8	Eider Merino Cortazar (ESP)	Movistar Team	+ 12' 37"
9	Ane Santesteban (ESP)	Alé–Cipollini	+ 13' 12"
10	Elisa Longo Borghini (ITA)	Wiggle High5	+ 13' 47"

== Classification leadership table ==
In the 2018 Giro d'Italia Femminile, five different jerseys were awarded. The most important was the general classification, which was calculated by adding each cyclist's finishing times on each stage. Time bonuses were awarded to the first three finishers on all stages with the exception of the time trials: the stage winner won a ten-second bonus, with six and four seconds for the second and third riders respectively. Bonus seconds were also awarded to the first three riders at intermediate sprints; three seconds for the winner of the sprint, two seconds for the rider in second and one second for the rider in third. The rider with the least accumulated time is the race leader, identified by a pink jersey. This classification was considered the most important of the 2017 Giro d'Italia Femminile, and the winner of the classification was considered the winner of the race.

Additionally, there was a points classification, which awarded a cyclamen jersey. In the points classification, cyclists received points for finishing in the top 10 in a stage, and unlike in the points classification in the Tour de France, the winners of all stages – with the exception of the team time trial, which awarded no points towards the classification – were awarded the same number of points. For winning a stage, a rider earned 15 points, with 12 for second, 10 for third, 8 for fourth, 6 for fifth with a point fewer per place down to a single point for 10th place.

Points for the mountains classification
Position	1	2	3	4	5
Points for Category 2	7	5	3	2	1
Points for Category 3	5	4	3	2	1

There was also a mountains classification, the leadership of which was marked by a green jersey. In the mountains classification, points towards the classification were won by reaching the top of a climb before other cyclists. Each climb was categorised as either second, or third-category, with more points available for the higher-categorised climbs; however on both categories, the top five riders were awarded points. The fourth jersey represented the young rider classification, marked by a white jersey. This was decided the same way as the general classification, but only riders born on or after 1 January 1995 were eligible to be ranked in the classification.

The fifth and final jersey represented the classification for Italian riders, marked by a blue jersey. This was decided the same way as the general classification, but only riders born in Italy were eligible to be ranked in the classification. There was also a team classification, in which the times of the best three cyclists per team on each stage were added together; the leading team at the end of the race was the team with the lowest total time. The daily team leaders wore red dossards in the following stage.

Stage	Winner	General classification	Points classification	Mountains classification	Young rider classification	Italian rider classification	Teams classification
1	Team Sunweb	Ellen van Dijk	Not awarded (Note: Jersey awarded post-stage, but no points on offer during the stage.)	Not awarded	Liane Lippert	Elena Cecchini	Team Sunweb
2	Kirsten Wild	Lucinda Brand	Kirsten Wild	Sheyla Gutiérrez	Juliette Labous	Elena Cecchini	Team Sunweb
3	Jolien D'Hoore	Leah Kirchmann	Kirsten Wild	Sheyla Gutiérrez	Juliette Labous	Elena Cecchini	Team Sunweb
4	Jolien D'Hoore	Leah Kirchmann	Kirsten Wild	Elisa Longo Borghini	Juliette Labous	Elisa Longo Borghini	Team Sunweb
5	Ruth Winder	Ruth Winder	Kirsten Wild	Elisa Longo Borghini	Sofia Bertizzolo	Elisa Longo Borghini	Team Sunweb
6	Amanda Spratt	Amanda Spratt	Kirsten Wild	Amanda Spratt	Sofia Bertizzolo	Elisa Longo Borghini	Team Sunweb
7	Annemiek van Vleuten	Annemiek van Vleuten	Kirsten Wild	Amanda Spratt	Nadia Quagliotto	Elisa Longo Borghini	Team Sunweb
8	Marianne Vos	Annemiek van Vleuten	Marianne Vos	Amanda Spratt	Nadia Quagliotto	Elisa Longo Borghini	Team Sunweb
9	Annemiek van Vleuten	Annemiek van Vleuten	Annemiek van Vleuten	Amanda Spratt	Sofia Bertizzolo	Elisa Longo Borghini	Team Sunweb
10	Annemiek van Vleuten	Annemiek van Vleuten	Annemiek van Vleuten	Amanda Spratt	Sofia Bertizzolo	Elisa Longo Borghini	Team Sunweb
Final		Annemiek van Vleuten	Annemiek van Vleuten	Amanda Spratt	Sofia Bertizzolo	Elisa Longo Borghini	Team Sunweb

== See also ==
- 2018 in women's road cycling
