= Women's Tour de Yorkshire =

Cycling stage race

Race details
- Date: April/May
- Region: Yorkshire, England
- Discipline: Road
- Type: One day Race (2015–2017); Stage race (2018–2019)
- Organiser: Amaury Sport Organisation; Welcome to Yorkshire

History
- First edition: 2015
- Editions: 5 (as of 2019)
- First winner: Louise Mahé (GBR)
- Most wins: No repeat winners
- Most recent: Marianne Vos (NED) (2019)

The Women's Tour de Yorkshire is a women's road cycling race in Yorkshire, England. From 2015 to 2017, the event was a one-day race. From 2018 onwards, the event has been a two-day event, with a UCI race classification of 2.1. The event is the female equivalent of the Tour de Yorkshire.

== History ==
The first Women's Tour de Yorkshire was run in 2015. The course consisted of four laps of a 20 kilometres (12 mi) course, and was won by Britain's Louise Mahé.

The 2016 event was run on the same course as a stage of the men's event, from Otley to Doncaster. The event had a prize fund of £15,000, and was broadcast live on ITV. The race was won by Dutch rider Kirsten Wild in a bunch sprint, after the breakaway was caught with 5 kilometres (3.1 mi) to go.

The 2017 event was run on the same course as the second stage of the men's race on 29 April. The event was won by Lizzie Deignan, who defied team orders to wait for the sprint finish, and broke away from the peloton 13 kilometres (8.1 mi) from the end of the race. In September 2017, it was announced that the 2018 Women's Tour de Yorkshire would be increased to two days.

The first stage of the 2018 event was from Beverley to Doncaster, and the second stage was a hilly route from Barnsley to Ilkley. Defending champion Deignan did not compete due to her pregnancy. The event was won by American Megan Guarnier.

The two stages of the 2019 women's race were run on the same course as the second and third days of the four-day men's race. Defending champion Megan Guarnier did not compete as she was only racing in North America during the 2019 season. The general classification was taken by Marianne Vos, who also won the second stage.

The 2020 race was postponed due to the coronavirus pandemic, and was later postponed again to 2022. The 2022 race was cancelled in September 2021 due to financial uncertainties.

== Winners ==
Year	Country	Rider	Team
2015	Great Britain	Louise Mahé	Ikon–Mazda
2016	Netherlands	Kirsten Wild	Team Hitec Products
2017	Great Britain	Lizzie Deignan	Boels–Dolmans
2018	United States	Megan Guarnier	Boels–Dolmans
2019	Netherlands	Marianne Vos	CCC - Liv
2020	No race due to the COVID-19 pandemic.		
2021	No race due to the COVID-19 pandemic.		
2022	No race due to financial problems.		
