= Megan Guarnier =

American cyclist

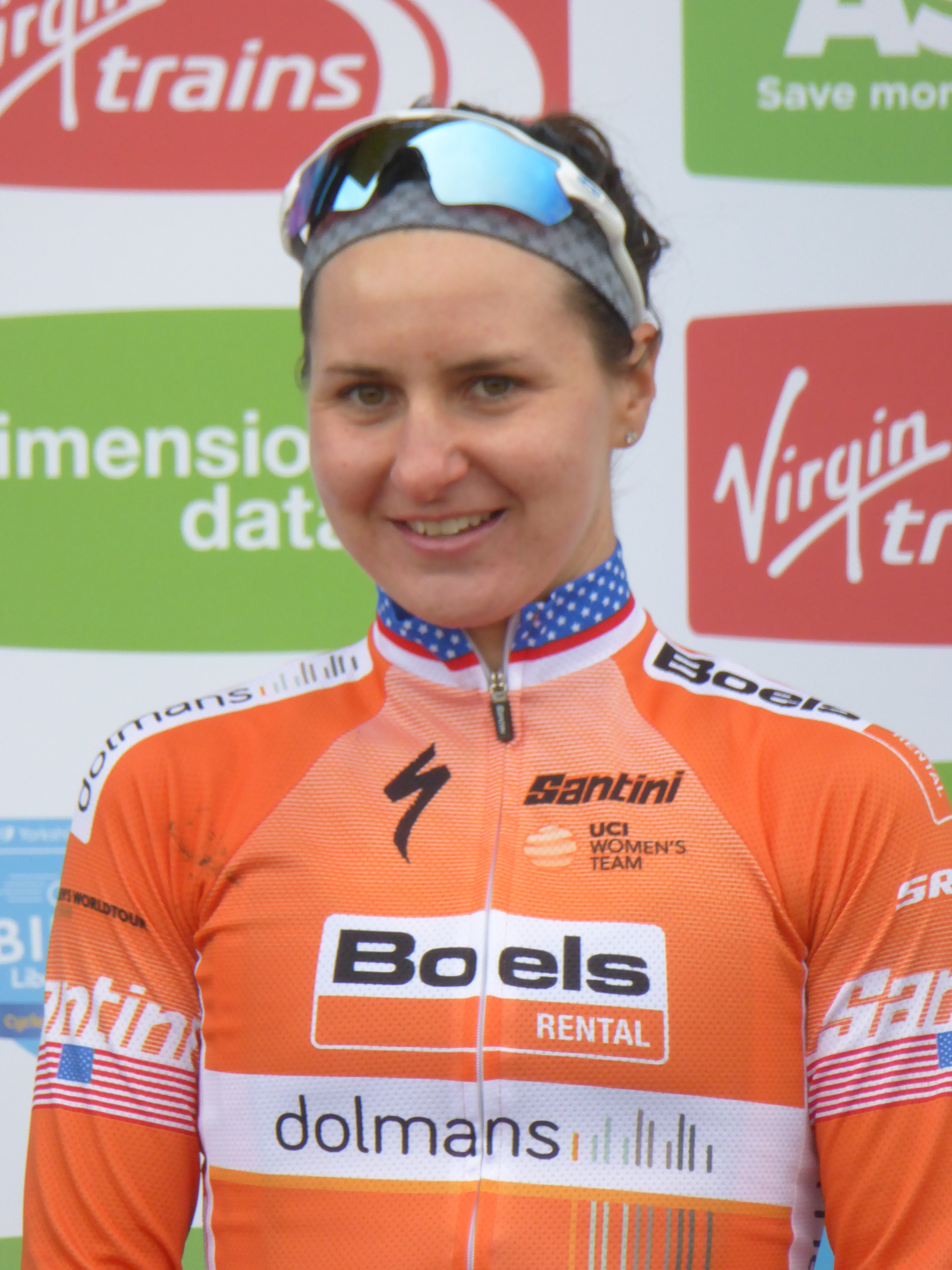
- Guarnier at the 2018 Women's Tour de Yorkshire.

Personal information
- Born: May 4, 1985 (age 41) Glens Falls, New York, U.S.
- Height: 5 ft 4 in (163 cm)

Cycling career
- Sport: Cycling
- Current team: Retired
- Discipline: Road
- Role: Rider
- Rider type: Climber

Professional teams
- 2010–2012: Team TIBCO–To The Top
- 2013: Rabobank-Liv Giant
- 2014–2018: Boels–Dolmans
- 2019: Tibco–Silicon Valley Bank

Major wins
- Stage races Giro d'Italia Femminile (2016) Tour of California (2016) Giro della Toscana Int. Femminile (2011) Ladies Tour of Norway (2015) Women's Tour de Yorkshire (2018) One-day races National Road Race Championships (2012, 2015, 2016) The Philadelphia Cycling Classic (2016) Strade Bianche (2015) Other UCI Women's World Tour Overall (2016)
Medal record
Women's road bicycle racing
Representing United States
Pan American Championships
Silver medal – second place	2014 Puebla	Road race
Bronze medal – third place	2014 Puebla	Time trial

Megan Guarnier (born May 4, 1985) is an American former racing cyclist, who rode professionally between 2010 and 2019 for Rabobank-Liv Giant, Boels–Dolmans and Tibco–Silicon Valley Bank teams. She won the United States National Road Race Championships three times (2012, 2015–16), major races such as Strade Bianche Donne (2015) and Giro d'Italia Femminile (2016), and the overall UCI Women's World Tour title in 2016. She retired at the end of 2018.

She was made a member of Phi Beta Kappa at Middlebury College in 2007.

== Major results ==
2009
2nd Cholet Pays de Loire Dames
2011
1st Overall Giro della Toscana Int. Femminile – Memorial Michela Fanini
9th Grand Prix Cycliste de Gatineau
2012
1st Road race, National Road Championships
3rd Ronde van Gelderland
4th Overall Trophée d'Or Féminin
5th Overall Giro della Toscana Int. Femminile – Memorial Michela Fanini
5th Le Samyn des Dames
7th Overall Grand Prix Elsy Jacobs
7th Omloop van Borsele
7th La Flèche Wallonne Féminine
10th Drentse 8 van Dwingeloo
2013
2nd Omloop Het Nieuwsblad
7th Overall Emakumeen Euskal Bira
7th Omloop van Borsele
9th Overall Holland Ladies Tour
9th Drentse 8 van Dwingeloo
2014
Pan American Road Championships

2nd Road race
3rd Time trial

2nd Road race, National Road Championships
3rd Open de Suède Vårgårda TTT
5th Overall BeNe Ladies Tour
6th Overall Emakumeen Euskal Bira
7th Overall Giro d'Italia Femminile
7th Cholet Pays de Loire Dames
8th Tour of Flanders
9th Overall Festival Luxembourgeois du cyclisme féminin Elsy Jacobs
10th Overall Holland Ladies Tour
2015
1st Road race, National Road Championships
1st Overall Ladies Tour of Norway

1st Stage 1

1st Strade Bianche
2nd Overall Women's Tour of New Zealand

1st Stage 1 (TTT)

3rd Road race, UCI Road World Championships
3rd Overall Giro d'Italia Femminile

1st Points classification
1st Stage 2

3rd La Flèche Wallonne Féminine
4th Overall Emakumeen Euskal Bira

1st Stage 1

6th Overall Holland Ladies Tour
9th Le Samyn des Dames
10th Tour of California Women's Time Trial
2016
1st Overall UCI Women's World Tour
1st Road race, National Road Championships
1st Overall Giro d'Italia Femminile

1st Points classification

1st Overall Tour of California

1st Points classification
1st Stage 1

1st Durango-Durango Emakumeen Saria
1st Philadelphia Cycling Classic
2nd Overall Emakumeen Euskal Bira

1st Stage 4

2nd Trofeo Alfredo Binda-Comune di Cittiglio
2nd Pajot Hills Classic
3rd La Flèche Wallonne Féminine
4th Tour of Flanders
5th GP de Plouay – Bretagne
6th Strade Bianche
2017
1st Stage 1 Tour of California
2nd Team time trial, UCI Road World Championships
2nd Overall Ladies Tour of Norway

1st Stage 3

4th Overall Giro d'Italia Femminile

1st Stages 1 (TTT) & 10

4th La Course by Le Tour de France
5th Overall Belgium Tour
7th Overall Grand Prix Elsy Jacobs
2018
1st Overall Women's Tour de Yorkshire

1st Mountains classification
1st Stage 2

2nd Road race, National Road Championships
3rd La Flèche Wallonne Féminine
5th Overall Giro Rosa
5th La Course by Le Tour de France
8th Liège–Bastogne–Liège
10th Tour of Flanders

=== General classification results timeline ===
Grand Tours
Race	2009	2010	2011	2012	2013	2014	2015	2016	2017	2018
Giro d'Italia Femminile	70	—	—	—	15	7	3	1	4	5
Grande Boucle Féminine Internationale	19	Did not exist								
Stage races
Race	2009	2010	2011	2012	2013	2014	2015	2016	2017	2018
Grand Prix Elsy Jacobs	21	—	—	7	26	9	—	—	7	—
Tour of California	Did not exist						—	1	33	20
Emakumeen Euskal Bira	—	—	—	—	7	6	4	2	—	—
Giro del Trentino Alto Adige-Südtirol	Did not contest during career									
The Women's Tour	Did not exist					32	—	—	—	—
Thüringen Rundfahrt der Frauen	Did not contest during career									
Ladies Tour of Norway	Did not exist					—	1	—	2	18
La Route de France	—	—	—	—	16	—	—	—	Not held	
Giro della Toscana Int. Femminile	54	—	1	5	—	—	—	—	—	—
Belgium Tour	Did not exist			—	—	—	—	—	5	—
Holland Ladies Tour	—	—	17	—	9	10	6	—	—	14

=== One-day race results timeline ===
Classic	2008	2009	2010	2011	2012	2013	2014	2015	2016	2017	2018
Strade Bianche	Did not exist							1	6	DNF	12
Trofeo Alfredo Binda	DNF	—	—	46	—	25	11	26	2	—	37
Gent–Wevelgem	Did not exist				—	—	—	—	11	—	22
Tour of Flanders	DNF	—	DNF	DNF	21	18	8	11	4	—	10

=== Major championship results timeline ===
Event		2008	2009	2010	2011	2012	2013	2014	2015	2016	2017	2018
Olympic Games	Road race	—	Not held			—	Not held			11	Not held	
World Championships	Team time trial	Did not exist				—	—	—	—	—	2	—
World Championships	Road race	—	—	—	—	33	14	47	3	27	DNF	16
National Championships	Time trial	29	—	—	14	13	15	6	7	—	—	—
National Championships	Road race	24	—	40	12	1	14	2	1	1	—	2

Legend
—	Did not compete
DNF	Did not finish
NH	Not held
