= 2014 UCI Road World Championships – Women's junior road race =

Women's junior road race
2014 UCI Road World Championships
- Rainbow jersey

Race details
- Dates: 26 September 2014
- Stages: 1
- Distance: 72.80 km (45.24 mi)
- Winning time: 2h 02' 59"

Medalists
	Gold	Amalie Dideriksen (DEN)
	Silver	Sofia Bertizzolo (ITA)
	Bronze	Agnieszka Skalniak (POL)

The Women's junior road race of the 2014 UCI Road World Championships took place in and around Ponferrada, Spain on 26 September 2014. The course of the race was 72.80 km (45.24 mi) with the start and finish in Ponferrada.

In a sprint finish of some eighteen riders, defending champion Amalie Dideriksen of Denmark was able to retain her title, repeating the feat of Great Britain pair Nicole Cooke in 2000 and 2001, and Lucy Garner in 2011 and 2012. Dideriksen out-sprinted Italy's Sofia Bertizzolo, the European champion, for the gold medal, with Agnieszka Skalniak of Poland taking the bronze medal.

== Qualification ==
All National Federations were allowed to enter eight riders for the race, with a maximum of four riders to start. In addition to this number, the outgoing World Champion and the current continental champions were also able to take part.

Champion	Name
Outgoing World Champion	Amalie Dideriksen (DEN)
African Champion	Monique Gerber (RSA)
Pan American Champion	Karen Flores (MEX)
Asian Champion	Nadezhda Geneleva (KAZ)
European Champion	Sofia Bertizzolo (ITA)
Oceanian	Elizabeth Stannard (NZL)

== Course ==
The race was held on the same circuit as the other road races and consisted of four laps. The circuit was 18.20 km (11.31 mi) long and included two hills. The total climbing was 306 m (1,004 ft) per lap and the maximum incline was 10.7%.

The first 4 km (2.5 mi) were flat, after which the climb to Alto de Montearenas started, with an average gradient of 8%. After a few hundred metres the ascent flattened and the remaining 5.1 km (3.2 mi) were at an average gradient of 3.5%. Next was a descent, with the steepest point after 11 km (6.8 mi) at a 16% negative gradient.

The Alto de Compostilla was a short climb of 1.1 km (0.68 mi), at an average gradient is 6.5% with some of the steepest parts at 11%. The remaining distance of 4.5 km (2.8 mi) was downhill thereafter, prior to the finish in Ponferrada.

== Schedule ==
All times are in Central European Time (UTC+1).

Date	Time	Event
26 September 2014	09:00–11:10	Women's junior road race
26 September 2014	11:30	Victory ceremony

== Participating nations ==
93 cyclists from 35 nations took part in the women's junior road race. The numbers of cyclists per nation are shown in parentheses.

- Australia (3)
- Austria (2)
- Belgium (4)
- Brazil (2)
- Canada (4)
- Colombia (2)
- Czech Republic (2)
- Denmark (2)
- Egypt (2)
- Estonia (1)
- France (4)
- Germany (4)
- (United Kingdom) Great Britain (4)
- (Republic of Ireland) Ireland (1)
- Italy (5)
- Japan (2)
- Kazakhstan (4)
- Latvia (1)
- Lithuania (3)
- Mauritius (1)
- Mexico (3)
- Netherlands (4)
- Poland (4)
- Romania (1)
- Russia (4)
- Serbia (1)
- Slovakia (1)
- Slovenia (1)
- South Africa (3)
- Spain (4) (host)
- Sweden (3)
- Switzerland (3)
- Turkey (3)
- United States (4)
- Uzbekistan (1)

== Prize money ==
The UCI assigned premiums for the top 3 finishers with a total prize money of €3,450.

Position	1st	2nd	3rd	Total
Amount	€1,533	€1,150	€767	€3,450

== Final classification ==
Of the race's 93 entrants, 85 riders completed the full distance of 72.8 km (45.2 mi).

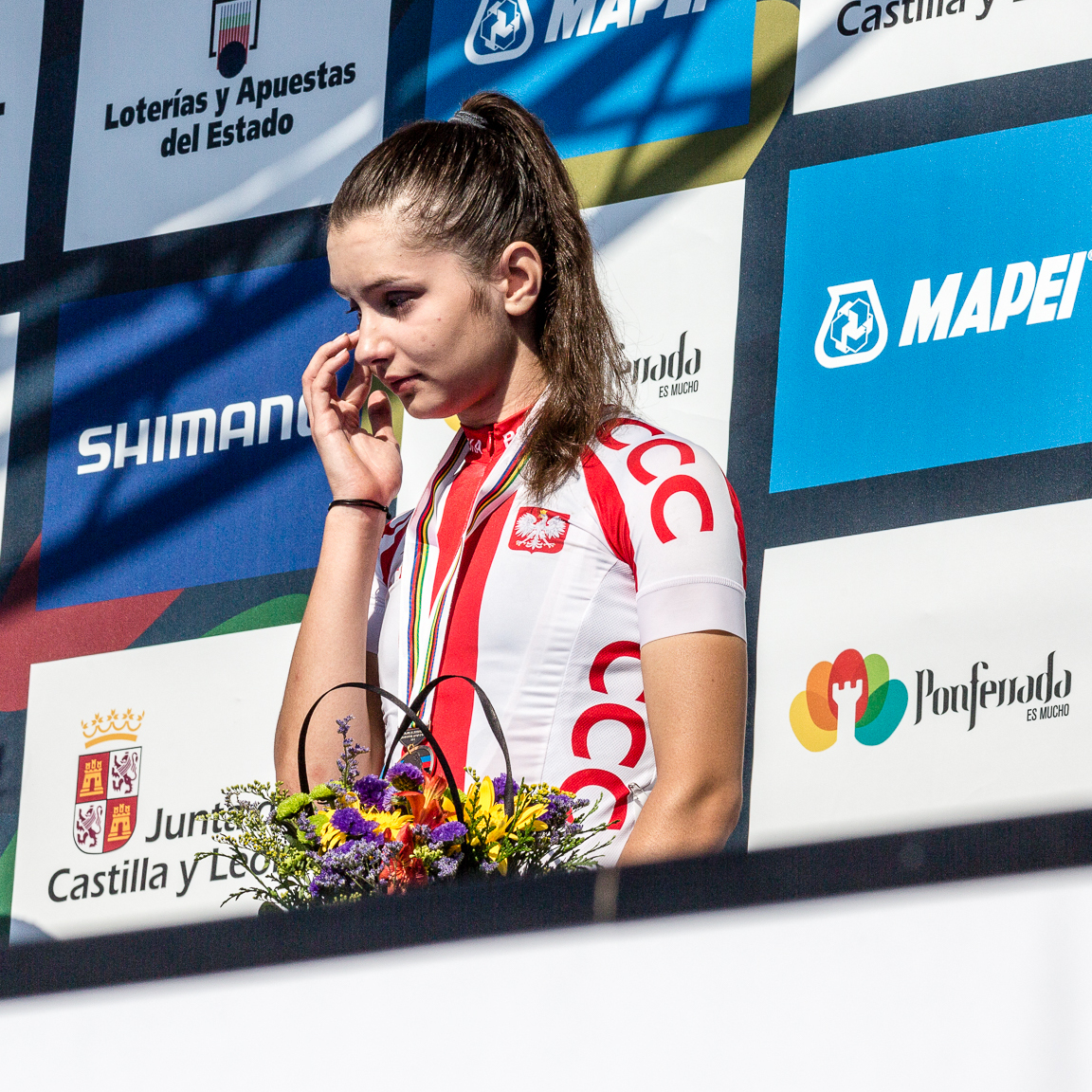
Agnieszka Skalniak finished third in the race.

Rank	Rider	Country	Time
1	Amalie Dideriksen	Denmark	2h 02' 59"
2	Sofia Bertizzolo	Italy	s.t.
3	Agnieszka Skalniak	Poland	s.t.
4	Nikola Nosková	Czech Republic	s.t.
5	Lisa Klein	Germany	s.t.
6	Gréta Richioud	France	s.t.
7	Jeanne Korevaar	Netherlands	s.t.
8	Jelena Erić	Serbia	s.t.
9	Saartje Vandenbroucke	Belgium	s.t.
10	Mathilde Cartal	France	s.t.
11	Alexandra Manly	Australia	s.t.
12	Daria Pikulik	Poland	s.t.
13	Kiyoka Sakaguchi	Japan	s.t.
14	Inga Rodieck	Germany	s.t.
15	Sina Frei	Switzerland	s.t.
16	Lenny Druyts	Belgium	s.t.
17	Janelle Cole	United States	s.t.
18	Yumi Kajihara	Japan	s.t.
19	Liah Harvie	Canada	+ 3"
20	Katia Ragusa	Italy	+ 3"
21	Svetlana Ryabova	Kazakhstan	+ 6"
22	Faina Potapova	Kazakhstan	+ 11"
23	Paula Patiño	Colombia	+ 11"
24	Sofia Beggin	Italy	+ 13"
25	Soline Lamboley	France	+ 15"
26	Maria Calderón	Spain	+ 15"
27	Pernille Mathiesen	Denmark	+ 15"
28	Dafne Theroux-Izquierdo	Canada	+ 15"
29	Angela Adelsberger	Austria	+ 15"
30	Camila Valbuena	Colombia	+ 15"
31	Cristina Martínez	Spain	+ 15"
32	Nikola Zdráhalová	Czech Republic	+ 15"
33	Laurence Dumais	Canada	+ 15"
34	Nikol Płosaj	Poland	+ 15"
35	Macey Stewart	Australia	+ 20"
36	Emma White	United States	+ 28"
37	Mel Lowther	Great Britain	+ 28"
38	Yarely Salazar	Mexico	+ 28"
39	Jip van den Bos	Netherlands	+ 30"
40	Endija Rutule	Latvia	+ 1' 32"
41	Bethany Hayward	Great Britain	+ 1' 42"
42	Sara Wackermann	Italy	+ 2' 18"
43	Maria Kantsyber	Russia	+ 2' 19"
44	Rocío García	Spain	+ 2' 19"
45	Madeleine Boutet	United States	+ 4' 10"
46	Hannah Swan	United States	+ 4' 10"
47	Julia Scheidegger	Switzerland	+ 6' 27"
48	Eva Maria Palm	Belgium	+ 7' 40"
49	Aline Seitz	Switzerland	+ 7' 49"
50	Milda Aužbikavičiūtė	Lithuania	+ 7' 49"
51	Megan Barker	Great Britain	+ 7' 49"
52	Anna-Leeza Hull	Australia	+ 7' 53"
53	Ellinor Huusko	Sweden	+ 9' 43"
54	Chanella Stougje	Netherlands	+ 9' 43"
55	Wiebke Rodieck	Germany	+ 9' 43"
56	Fanny Zambon	France	+ 9' 43"
57	Ema Manikaitė	Lithuania	+ 9' 43"
58	Marta Łach	Poland	+ 9' 43"
59	Katja Jeretina	Slovenia	+ 9' 43"
60	Brenda Santoyo	Mexico	+ 9' 43"
61	Viktoria Popova	Russia	+ 9' 43"
62	Karen Flores	Mexico	+ 9' 43"
63	Ernesta Strainytė	Lithuania	+ 9' 43"
64	Christina Schweinberger	Austria	+ 9' 43"
65	Anastasiia Pliaskina	Russia	+ 9' 43"
66	Sara Poidevin	Canada	+ 9' 43"
67	Coral Casado	Spain	+ 9' 43"
68	Jacqueline Dietrich	Germany	+ 9' 43"
69	Catherine Colyn	South Africa	+ 9' 43"
70	Daria Egorova	Russia	+ 9' 48"
71	Kimberley Le Court	Mauritius	+ 10' 22"
72	Nicole Nesti	Italy	+ 10' 37"
73	Ebtissam Zayed Ahmed	Egypt	+ 11' 18"
74	Aafke Soet	Netherlands	+ 12' 06"
75	Ana Paula Casetta	Brazil	+ 14' 16"
76	Linda Halleröd	Sweden	+ 15' 03"
77	Yekaterina Yuraitis	Kazakhstan	+ 16' 17"
78	Nadezhda Geneleva	Kazakhstan	+ 16' 21"
79	Mari-Liis Mõttus	Estonia	+ 16' 21"
80	Michelle Benson	South Africa	+ 16' 21"
81	Renata da Silva Lopes	Brazil	+ 16' 21"
82	Marike Tache	Romania	+ 16' 21"
83	Ayşe Çakır	Turkey	+ 16' 21"
84	Ekaterina Knebeleva	Uzbekistan	+ 16' 21"
85	Monique Gerber	South Africa	+ 16' 34"
	Grace Garner	Great Britain	DNF
	Menatalla Essam Ragab	Egypt	DNF
	Gamze Kıyas	Turkey	DNF
	Julia Karlsson	Sweden	DNF
	Josie Knight	Ireland	DNF
	Fien Delbaere	Belgium	DNF
	Zeynep Ezgi Tekinoğlu	Turkey	DNF
	Tereza Medveďová	Slovakia	DNF
