= 2013 UCI Road World Championships – Women's junior road race =

Women's junior road race
2013 UCI Road World Championships
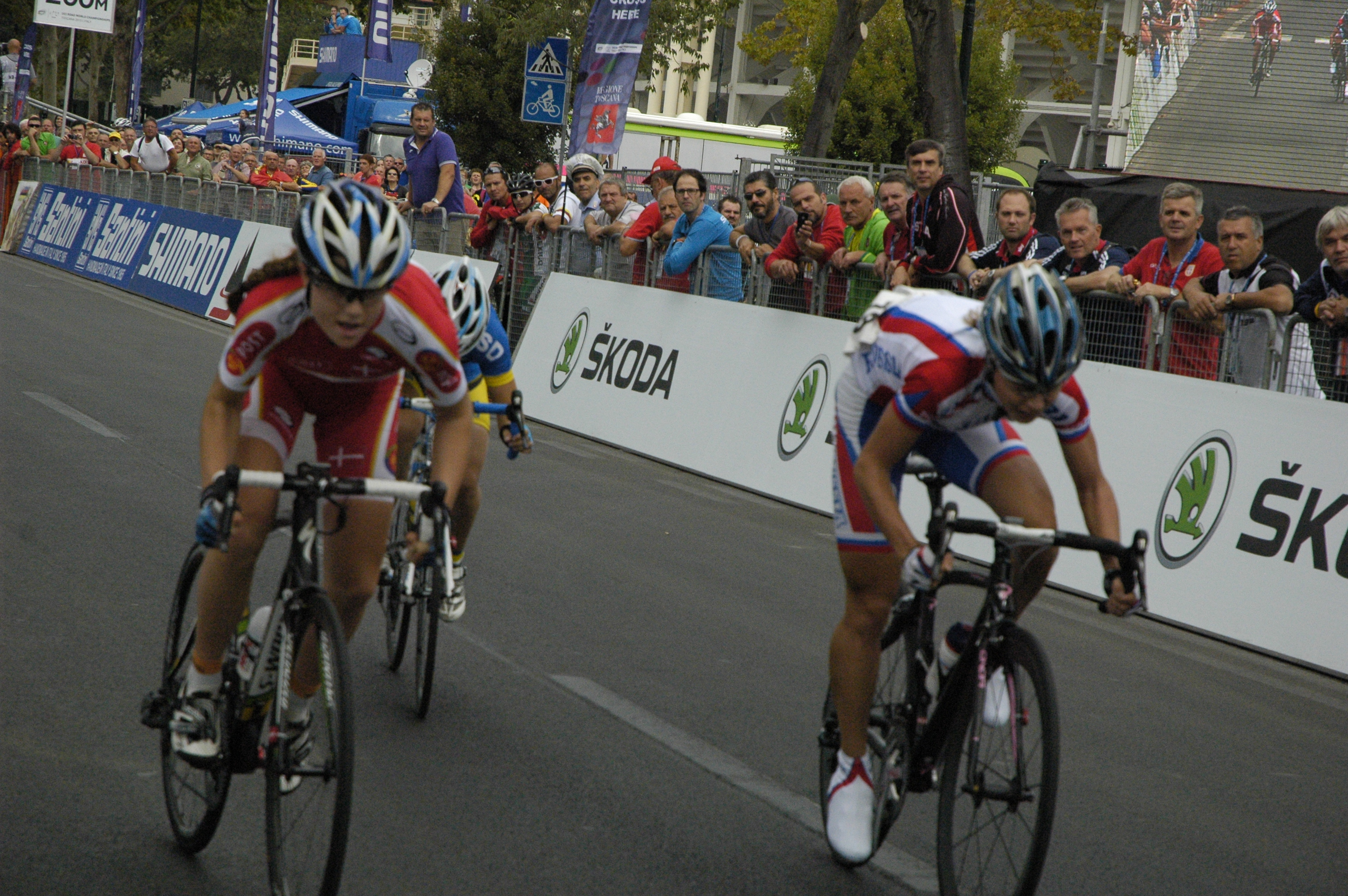
- Final sprint of the front group

Race details
- Dates: 27 September 2013
- Stages: 1
- Distance: 82.85 km (51.48 mi)
- Winning time: 2h 32' 23"

Medalists
	Gold	Amalie Dideriksen (Denmark)
	Silver	Anastasiia Iakovenko (Russia)
	Bronze	Olena Demydova (Ukraine)

The Women's junior road race of the 2013 UCI Road World Championships was a cycling event that took place on 27 September 2013 in the region of Tuscany, Italy.

The race route was 82.85 km long and the start and finish were by the Nelson Mandela Forum in Florence.

== Qualification ==
All National Federations could enter 8 riders of whom 4 could start. Besides of that, the below listed continental champions could be entered in addition to this number.

Champion	Name
American Champion	Brenda Santoyo (MEX)
Asian Champion	Yao Pang (HKG)
European Champion	Greta Richioud (FRA)
Oceanian Champion	Josie Talbot (AUS)

== Participating nations ==
31 nations participated in the women's junior road race.

- Argentina
- Australia
- Austria
- Belgium
- Belarus
- Canada
- Colombia
- Czech Republic
- Denmark
- Spain
- Estonia
- France
- (United Kingdom) Great Britain
- Germany
- Hong Kong
- Italy
- Jordan
- Japan
- Lithuania
- Mexico
- Netherlands
- New Zealand
- Poland
- South Africa
- Russia
- Serbia
- Slovakia
- Sweden
- Thailand
- Ukraine
- United States

== Schedule ==
Date	Time	Event
27 September 2013	08:30-10:50	Women's junior time trial
27 September 2013	11:10	Victory ceremony

== Final classification ==
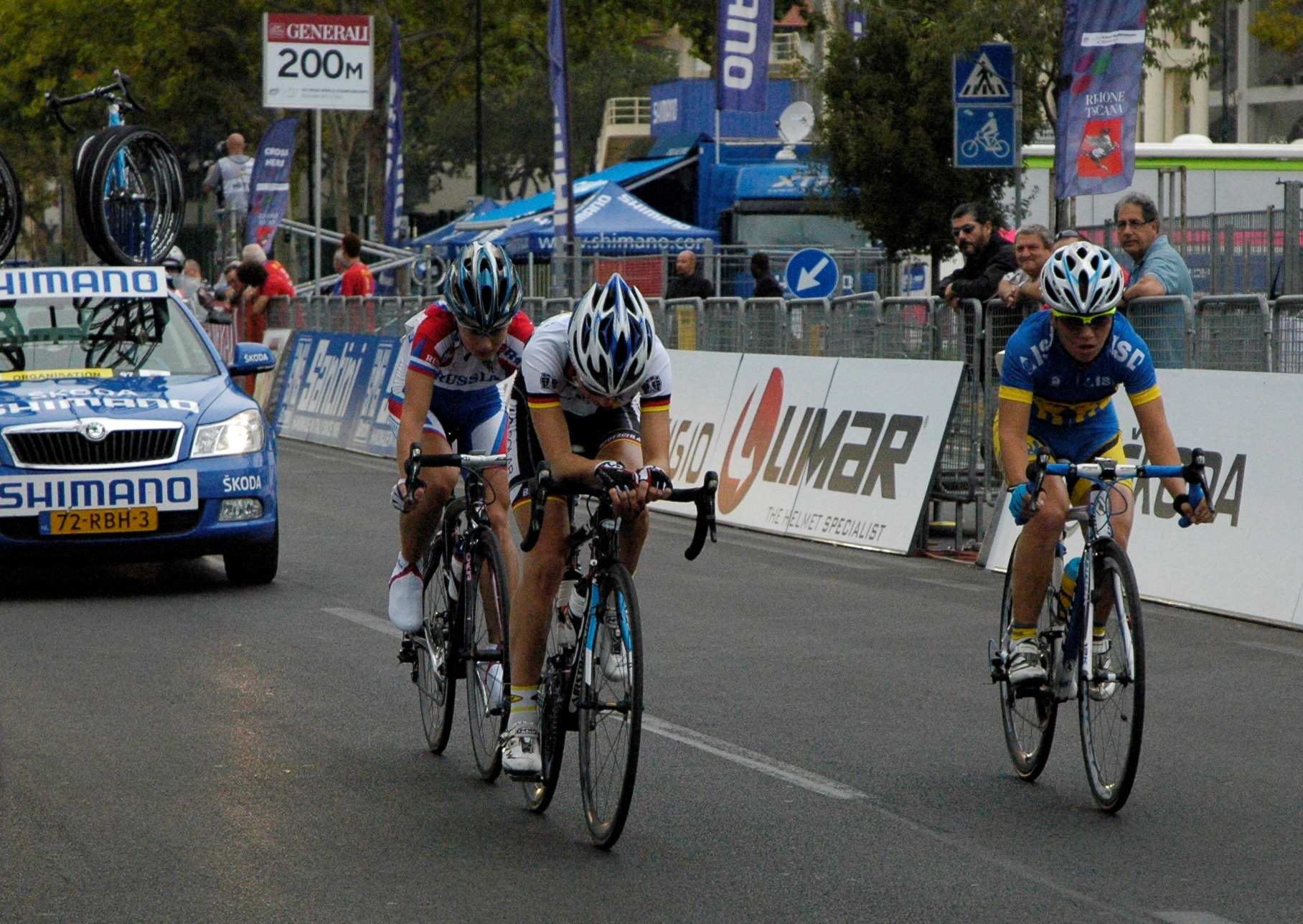
Front group (lap 1)

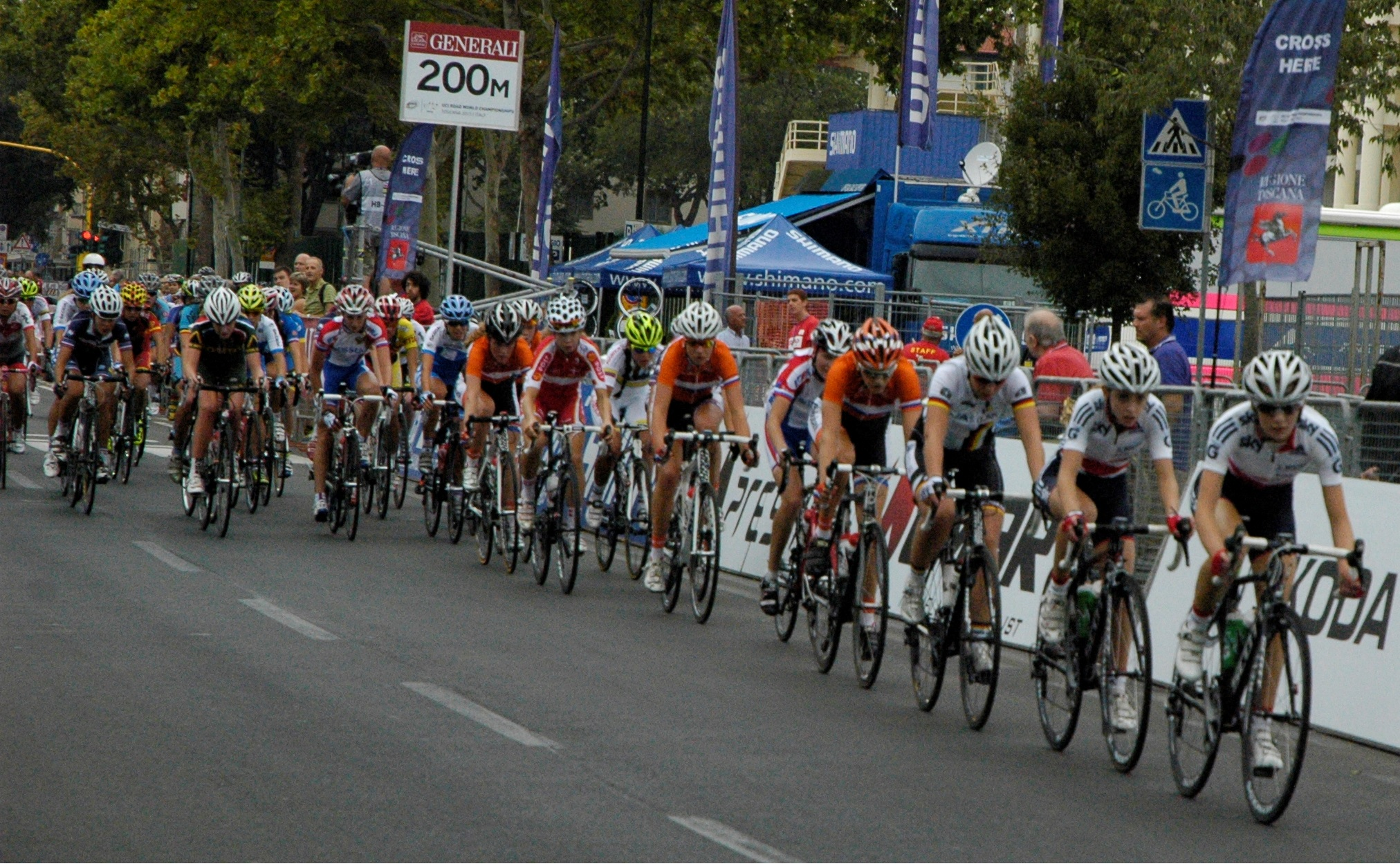
Peloton (lap 3)

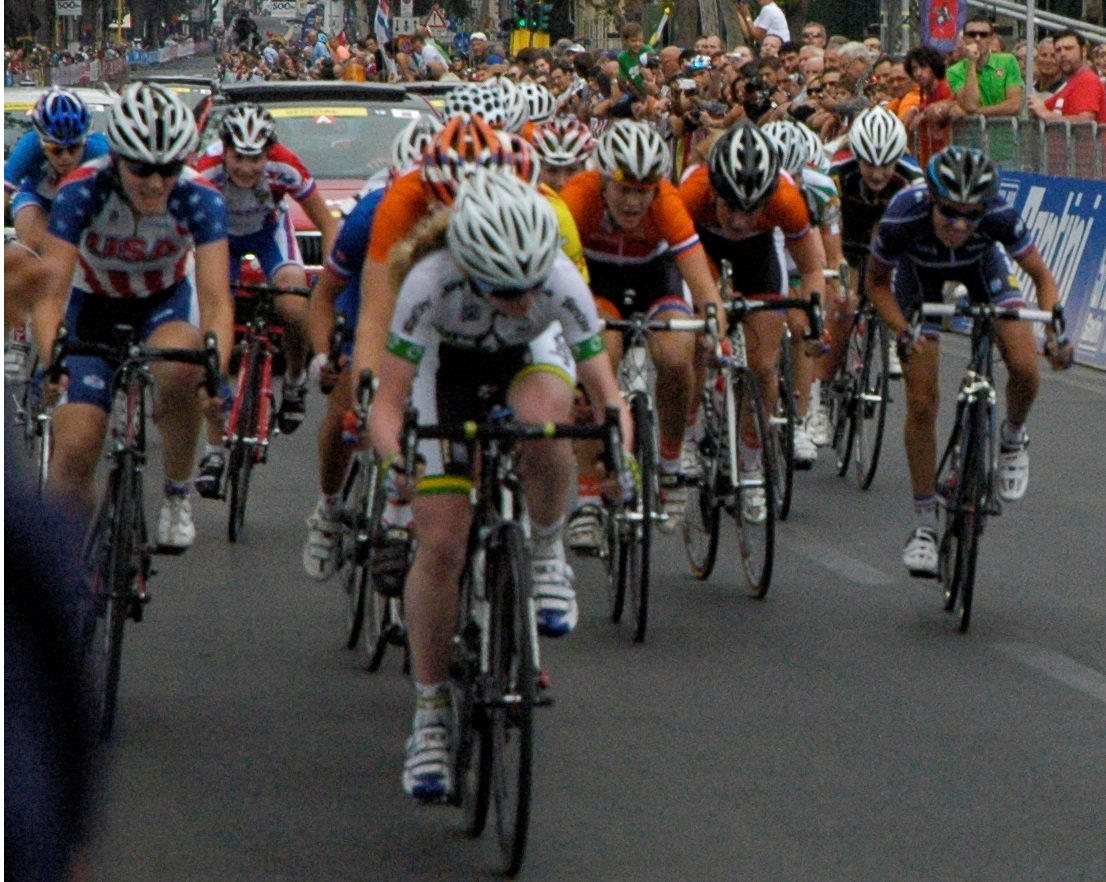
Sprint peloton (lap 5)

Rank	Rider	Country	Time
1st place, gold medalist(s)	Amalie Dideriksen	Denmark	2h 32' 23"
2nd place, silver medalist(s)	Anastasiia Iakovenko	Russia	+ 0"
3rd place, bronze medalist(s)	Olena Demydova	Ukraine	+ 3"
4	Jessenia Meneses	Colombia	+ 18"
5	Milda Jankauskaitė	Lithuania	+ 34"
6	Tereza Medveďová	Slovakia	+ 34"
7	Séverine Eraud	France	+ 34"
8	Alexandra Manly	Australia	+ 34"
9	Kelly Catlin	United States	+ 34"
10	Jeanne Korevaar	Netherlands	+ 34"
11	Lisa Klein	Germany	+ 34"
12	Ksenia Tuhai	Belarus	+ 34"
13	Floortje Mackaij	Netherlands	+ 34"
14	Valentina Nesterova	Russia	+ 34"
15	Corine van der Zijden	Netherlands	+ 34"
16	Cecilie Uttrup Ludwig	Denmark	+ 34"
17	Demi de Jong	Netherlands	+ 34"
18	Svetlana Vasilieva	Russia	+ 34"
19	Anežka Drahotová	Czech Republic	+ 34"
20	Bethany Hayward	Great Britain	+ 34"
21	Heidi Dalton	South Africa	+ 34"
22	Greta Richioud	France	+ 34"
23	Ilaria Bonomi	Italy	+ 39"
24	Angela Maffeis	Italy	+ 1' 44"
25	Anna Christian	Great Britain	+ 1' 59"
26	Tatjana Paller	Germany	+ 2' 50"
27	Bogumila Dziuba	Poland	+ 2' 50"
28	Nicole Dal Santo	Italy	+ 2' 53"
29	Lotte Kopecky	Belgium	+ 3' 01"
30	Alicia González Blanco	Spain	+ 3' 06"
31	Jelena Erić	Serbia	+ 3’ 6"
32	Lierni Lekuona Etxebeste	Spain	+ 3’ 6"
33	Zavinta Titenyte	Lithuania	+ 3’ 6"
34	Kelly Van den Steen	Belgium	+ 3’ 9"
35	Demmy Druiyts	Belgium	+ 3’ 46"
36	Kiyoka Sakaguchi	Japan	+ 3’ 48"
37	Jessica Parra Rojas	Colombia	+ 4’ 3"
38	Marine Lemarie	France	+ 5’ 0"
39	Brenda Santoyo	Mexico	+ 5’ 0"
40	Arianna Fidanza	Italy	+ 5’ 5"
41	Lina Maria Duenas Lopez	Colombia	+ 6’ 40"
42	Julia Karlsson	Sweden	+ 6’ 54"
43	Laura Perry	France	+ 6’ 54"
44	Polina Yurieva	Ukraine	+ 6’ 54"
45	Razan Soboh	Jordan	+ 7’ 2"
46	Anna Knauer	Germany	+ 7’ 30"
47	Hannah Swan	United States	+ 8’ 54"
48	Jurgita Kubiliunaite	Lithuania	+ 10’ 7"
49	Tessa Pinckston	Canada	+ 10’ 39"
50	Katsiaryna Piatrouskaya	Belarus	+ 10’ 39"
51	Kinley Gibson	Canada	+ 10’ 44"
52	Emily McRedmond	Australia	+ 11’ 49"
53	Agata Drozdek	Poland	+ 11’ 54"
54	Rasa Pocytė	Lithuania	+ 12’ 36"
55	Yao Pang	Hong Kong	+ 13’ 30"
56	Luisa Kattinger	Germany	+ 13’ 30"
57	Dafné Théroux-Izquierdo	Canada	+ 13’ 32"
58	Kärolin Varblane	Estonia	+ 13’ 32"
59	Solène Vinsot	France	+ 13’ 32"
60	Frida Mendoza	Mexico	+ 13’ 37"
-	Astrid Gassner	Austria	DNF
-	Elisabeth Riegler	Austria	DNF
-	Nikol Płosaj	Poland	DNF
-	Kristina Savelyeva	Russia	DNF
-	Alexandria Nicholls	Australia	DNF
-	Kaat Van der Meulen	Belgium	DNF
-	Karen Fernanda Sierra Mendez	Mexico	DNF
-	Jaruwan Somrat	Thailand	DNF
-	Maddi Campbell	New Zealand	DNF
-	Devon Hiley	New Zealand	DNF
-	Maria San Jose Tejerina	Spain	DNF
-	Natalia Nowotarska	Poland	DNF
-	Alba Teruel	Spain	DNF
-	Madeline Marshall	Australia	DNF
-	Brenda Villareal Garza	Mexico	DNF
-	Kajsa Persson	Sweden	DNF
-	Marie-Ève Poisson	Canada	DNF
-	Sara Youmans	United States	DNF
-	Linda Jacobsson	Sweden	DNF
-	Kathrin Schweinberger	Austria	DNF
-	Natasha Jaworski	Argentina	DNF
