= Oeschger =

Oeschger is a German surname. Notable people with the surname include:

- Annabell Oeschger (born 1993), German racing cyclist
- Hans Oeschger (1927–1998), Swiss climatologist
- Joe Oeschger (1892–1986), American baseball player
