= Van Den Haute =

Van Den Haute or Vandenhaute is a surname. Notable people with the surname include:

- Ferdi Van Den Haute (born 1952), Belgian cyclist
- Steffy Van Den Haute (born 1993), Belgian cyclist
- Wouter Vandenhaute (born 1962), Belgian businessman and journalist
