= Huusko =

Huusko is a Finnish surname. Notable people with the surname include:

- Ellinor Huusko (born 1996), Swedish racing cyclist
- Keijo Huusko (born 1980), Finnish footballer
