= Šimenc =

Šimenc is a surname. Notable people with the surname include:

- Dubravko Šimenc (born 1966), Croatian water polo player and coach
- Laura Šimenc (born 1990), Slovenian racing cyclist
- Miha Šimenc (born 1995), Slovenian skier
- Zlatko Šimenc (1938–2026), Croatian water polo player and coach
