= List of 2015 UCI Women's Teams and riders =

Listed below are the UCI Women's Teams that compete in 2015 women's road cycling events organized by the International Cycling Union (UCI), including the 2015 UCI Women's Road World Cup.

== Teams overview ==
The country designation of each team is determined by the country of registration of the largest number of its riders, and is not necessarily the country where the team is registered or based.

List updated 8 January 2015 (

)

The 2015 UCI Women's Teams are:

Code	Official team name	Country	Continent
ALE	Astana–Acca Due O (2015 season)	Italy	Europe
ASA	Alé Cipollini (2015 season)	Kazakhstan	Asia
BPK	BePink-La Classica (2015 season)	Italy	Europe
BCT	Bigla Pro Cycling Team (2015 season)	Switzerland	Europe
BPD	Bizkaia–Durango (2015 season)	Spain	Europe
DLT	Boels Dolmans Cycling Team (2015 season)	Netherlands	Europe
BTC	BTC City Ljubljana (2015 season)	Slovenia	Europe
BZK	BZK Emakumeen Bira (2015 season)	Spain	Europe
GPC	China Chongming–Liv–Champion System Pro Cycling (2015 season)	Hong Kong	Asia
FCT	Feminine Cycling Team (2015 season)	Germany	Europe
HPU	Hitec Products (2015 season)	Norway	Europe
ISG	Inpa Sottoli Giusfredi (2015 season)	Italy	Europe
SLP	Itau Shimano Ladies Power Team (2015 season)	Argentina	America
LWZ	Lensworld.eu–Zannata (2015 season)	Belgium	Europe
LTK	Lointek Team (2015 season)	Spain	Europe
LBL	Lotto–Soudal Ladies (2015 season)	Belgium	Europe
MAT	Matrix Fitness (2015 season)	United Kingdom	Europe
NOE	NÖ RadUnion Vitalogic (2015 season)	Austria	Europe
OPW	Optum-Kelly Benefit Strategies (2015 season)	United States	America
GEW	Orica–AIS (2015 season)	Australia	Oceania
PHV	Parkhotel Valkenburg Continental Team (2015 season)	Netherlands	Europe
PPC	Pepper Palace p/b The Happy Tooth (2015 season)	United States	America
FUT	Poitou–Charentes.Futuroscope.86 (2015 season)	France	Europe
RBW	Rabo–Liv Women Cycling Team (2015 season)	Netherlands	Europe
MIC	S.C. Michela Fanini Rox (2015 season)	Italy	Europe
SEF	Servetto Footon (2015 season)	Italy	Europe
TLP	Team Liv–Plantur (2015 season)	Netherlands	Europe
TRY	Team Rytger (2015 season)	Denmark	Europe
TIB	Team TIBCO-SVB (2015 season)	United States	America
TOG	Top Girls Fassa Bortolo (2015 season)	Italy	Europe
VLL	Topsport Vlaanderen–Pro-Duo (2015 season)	Belgium	Europe
TI6	Twenty16 p/b Sho-Air (2015 season)	United States	America
UHC	UnitedHealthcare Professional Cycling Team (2015 season)	United States	America
VAI	Vaiano Fondriest (2015 season)	Italy	Europe
VEL	Velocio–SRAM (2015 season)	Germany	Europe
WHT	Wiggle–Honda (2015 season)	United Kingdom	Europe

== Riders ==
This is a list of riders riding for the UCI Women's Teams in 2015 sorted by team.

=== Alé–Cipollini ===
As of 10 March 2015. Ages as of 1 January 2015.

Rider	Date of birth
Elena Berlato (ITA)	August 2, 1988 (aged 26)
Beatrice Bartelloni (ITA)	February 5, 1993 (aged 21)
Simona Frapporti (ITA)	July 14, 1988 (aged 26)
Francesca Cauz (ITA)	September 24, 1992 (aged 22)
Marta Tagliaferro (ITA)	November 4, 1989 (aged 25)
Annalisa Cucinotta (ITA)	March 4, 1986 (aged 28)
Flávia Oliveira (BRA)	October 27, 1981 (aged 33)
Uênia Fernandes de Souza (BRA)	August 12, 1984 (aged 30)

Rider	Date of birth
Alice Algisi (ITA)	March 10, 1993 (aged 21)
Beatrice Rossato (ITA)	November 6, 1996 (aged 18)
Fleur Faure (FRA)	August 13, 1993 (aged 21)
Arianna Fidanza (ITA)	January 6, 1995 (aged 19)
Dalia Muccioli (ITA)	May 22, 1993 (aged 21)
Maria Giulia Confalonieri (ITA)	March 30, 1993 (aged 21)
Małgorzata Jasińska (POL)	January 18, 1984 (aged 30)

=== Astana–Acca Due O ===
As of 10 March 2015. Ages as of 1 January 2015.

Rider	Date of birth
Aizhan Zhaparova (RUS)	May 1, 1989 (aged 25)
Kseniya Dobrynina (RUS)	January 11, 1994 (aged 20)
Larisa Pankova (RUS)	May 12, 1991 (aged 23)
Marika Campagnaro (ITA)	March 27, 1996 (aged 18)
Yekaterina Yuraitis (KAZ)	August 8, 1996 (aged 18)
Natalya Saifutdinova (KAZ)	February 11, 1989 (aged 25)
Makhabbat Umutzhanova (KAZ)	August 11, 1994 (aged 20)
Marzhan Baitleuova (KAZ)	March 12, 1994 (aged 20)

Rider	Date of birth
Faina Potapova (KAZ)	September 12, 1996 (aged 18)
Natalya Sokovnina (KAZ)	January 18, 1990 (aged 24)
Aliya Kargaliyeva (KAZ)	March 22, 1993 (aged 21)
Milda Jankauskaitė (LTU)	October 1, 1995 (aged 19)
Íngrid Drexel (MEX)	July 28, 1993 (aged 21)
Carolina Rodriguez Gutierrez (MEX)	September 30, 1993 (aged 21)
Olena Demydova (UKR)	September 11, 1995 (aged 19)

=== BePink LaClassica ===
As of 29 March 2016. Ages as of 1 January 2016.

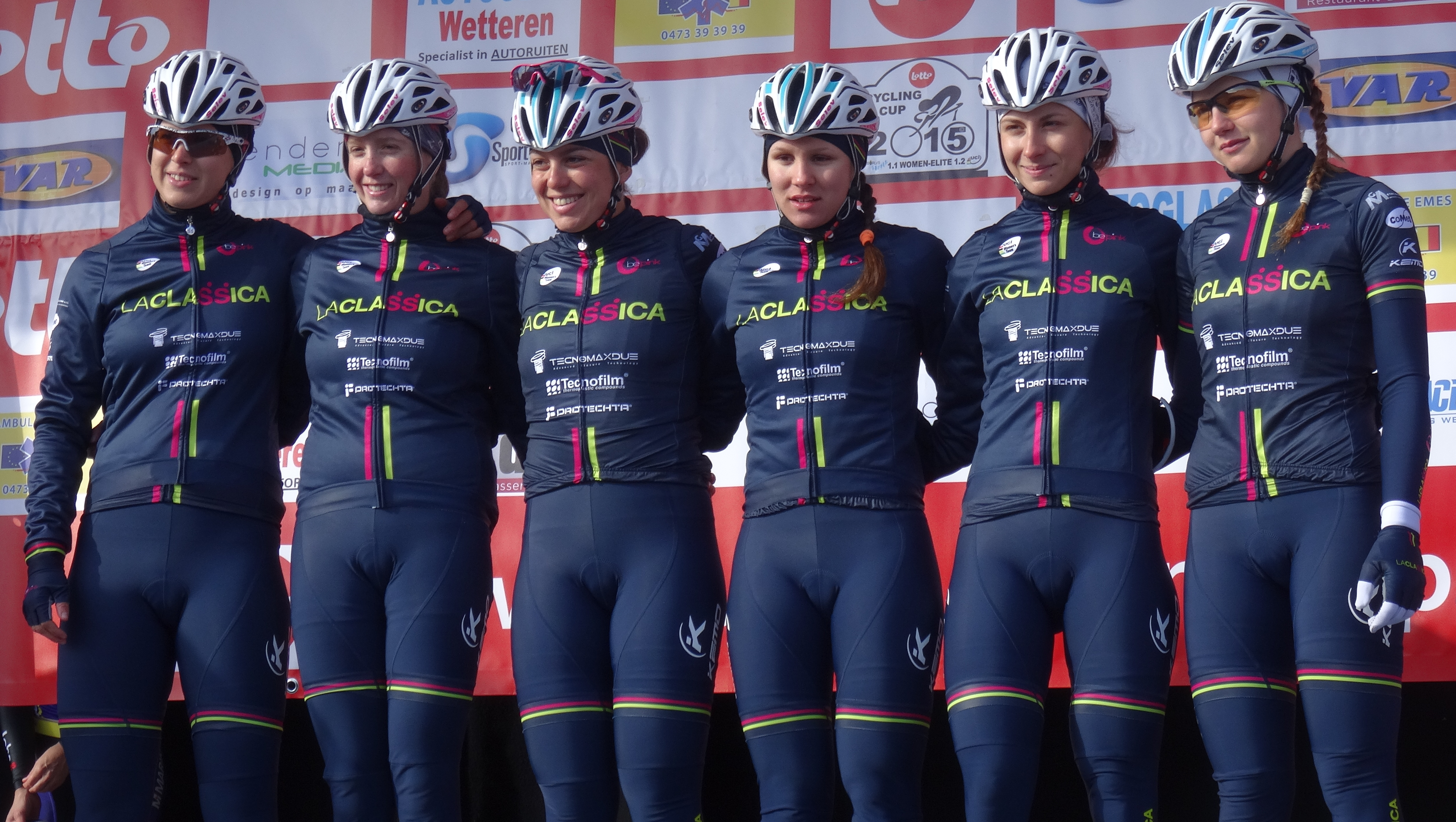
The squad during the 2015 Le Samyn des Dames

Rider	Date of birth
Ilaria Bonomi (ITA)	May 13, 1995 (aged 20)
Simona Bortolotti (ITA)	December 6, 1994 (aged 21)
Anastasia Chulkova (RUS)	March 7, 1985 (aged 30)
Ana Maria Covrig (ROU)	December 8, 1994 (aged 21)
Giorgia Fraiegari (ITA)	July 18, 1995 (aged 20)
Ruby Livingstone (NZL)	March 12, 1993 (aged 22)
Michela Maltese (ITA)	April 20, 1995 (aged 20)

Rider	Date of birth
Tereza Medveďová (SVK)	March 27, 1996 (aged 19)
Jaime Nielsen (NZL)	September 3, 1985 (aged 30)
Ilaria Sanguineti (ITA)	April 15, 1994 (aged 21)
Ksenyia Tuhai (BLR)	July 1, 1995 (aged 20)
Silvia Valsecchi (ITA)	July 19, 1982 (aged 33)
Georgia Williams (NZL)	August 25, 1993 (aged 22)
Lex Albrecht (CAN)	April 6, 1987 (aged 28)
Olga Zabelinskaya (RUS)	May 10, 1980 (aged 35)

=== Bigla Pro Cycling Team ===
As of 10 March 2015. Ages as of 1 January 2015.

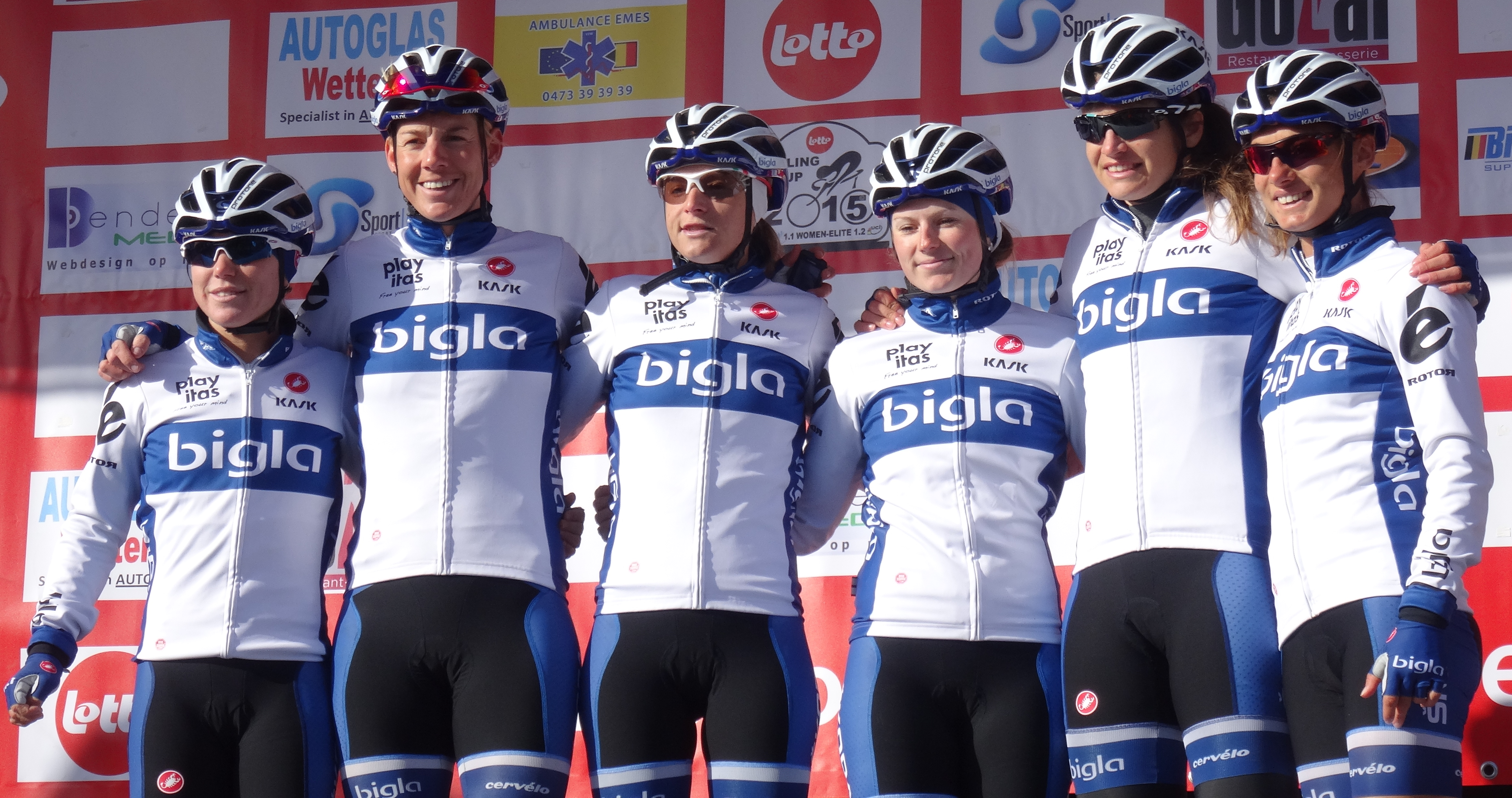
The squad during the 2015 Le Samyn des Dames

Rider	Date of birth
Ashleigh Moolman-Pasio (RSA)	December 9, 1985 (aged 29)
Clara Koppenburg (GER)	August 3, 1995 (aged 19)
Lisa Klein (GER)	July 15, 1996 (aged 18)
Joëlle Numainville (CAN)	November 20, 1987 (aged 27)
Shelley Olds (USA)	September 30, 1980 (aged 34)
Lotta Lepistö (FIN)	June 28, 1989 (aged 25)
Sharon Laws (GBR)	July 7, 1974 (aged 40)

Rider	Date of birth
Annemiek van Vleuten (NED)	October 8, 1982 (aged 32)
Iris Slappendel (NED)	February 18, 1985 (aged 29)
Vera Koedooder (NED)	October 31, 1983 (aged 31)
Nicole Hanselmann (SUI)	May 6, 1991 (aged 23)
Emilie Aubry (SUI)	February 16, 1989 (aged 25)
Caroline Baur (SUI)	April 17, 1994 (aged 20)
Doris Schweizer (SUI)	August 28, 1989 (aged 25)

=== Bizkaia–Durango ===
As of 10 March 2015. Ages as of 1 January 2015.

Rider	Date of birth
Anna Ramírez Bauxel (ESP)	March 14, 1981 (aged 33)
Lierni Lekuona Etxebeste (ESP)	April 8, 1995 (aged 19)
Ainara Sanz (ESP)	January 15, 1995 (aged 19)
Paula Lanz Blazquez (ESP)	October 9, 1996 (aged 18)
Coral Casado Ortiz (ESP)	March 27, 1996 (aged 18)

Rider	Date of birth
Lourdes Oyarbide Jimenez (ESP)	April 8, 1994 (aged 20)
Mayalen Noriega (ESP)	February 19, 1982 (aged 32)
Elisabet Escursell Valero (ESP)	October 30, 1996 (aged 18)
Dorleta Eskamendi Gil (ESP)	January 2, 1992 (aged 22)
Yulia Ilinykh (RUS)	October 6, 1985 (aged 29)

=== BMW p/b Happy Tooth Dental ===
As of 10 March 2015. Ages as of 1 January 2015.

Rider	Date of birth
Miranda Griffiths (AUS)	October 4, 1981 (aged 33)
Shoshauna Routley (CAN)	October 20, 1986 (aged 28)
Rhae-Christie Shaw (CAN)	November 20, 1975 (aged 39)
Megan Rathwell (CAN)	September 28, 1984 (aged 30)
Korina Huizar (USA)	September 16, 1987 (aged 27)

Rider	Date of birth
Elle Anderson (USA)	March 29, 1988 (aged 26)
Liza Rachetto (USA)	January 30, 1974 (aged 40)
Jessica Uebelhart (SUI)	October 16, 1990 (aged 24)
Robin Farina (USA)	September 3, 1977 (aged 37)
Erica Zaveta (USA)	September 6, 1989 (aged 25)

=== Boels–Dolmans Cycling Team ===
As of 1 January 2015. Ages as of 1 January 2015.

Rider	Date of birth
Lizzie Deignan (GBR)	December 18, 1988 (aged 26)
Chantal Blaak (NED)	October 22, 1989 (aged 25)
Amalie Dideriksen (DEN)	May 24, 1996 (aged 18)
Ellen van Dijk (NED)	February 11, 1987 (aged 27)
Megan Guarnier (USA)	May 4, 1985 (aged 29)
Demi de Jong (NED)	February 11, 1995 (aged 19)

Rider	Date of birth
Sanne van Paassen (NED)	October 27, 1988 (aged 26)
Romy Kasper (GER)	May 5, 1988 (aged 26)
Christine Majerus (LUX)	February 25, 1987 (aged 27)
Katarzyna Pawłowska (POL)	August 16, 1989 (aged 25)
Evelyn Stevens (USA)	May 9, 1983 (aged 31)

=== BTC City Ljubljana ===
As of 10 March 2015. Ages as of 1 January 2015.

Rider	Date of birth
Martina Ritter (AUT)	September 23, 1982 (aged 32)
Mia Radotić (CRO)	December 2, 1984 (aged 30)
Elena Valentini (ITA)	March 30, 1992 (aged 22)
Eugenia Bujak (POL)	June 25, 1989 (aged 25)
Jelena Erić (SRB)	January 15, 1996 (aged 18)
Anita Žnidaršic (SLO)	March 1, 1996 (aged 18)
Urša Pintar (SLO)	October 3, 1985 (aged 29)
Polona Batagelj (SLO)	June 7, 1989 (aged 25)

Rider	Date of birth
Alenka Novak (SLO)	August 17, 1977 (aged 37)
Špela Kern (SLO)	February 24, 1990 (aged 24)
Anja Rugelj (SLO)	June 25, 1986 (aged 28)
Olena Pavlukhina (AZE)	March 1, 1989 (aged 25)
Tesa Vilar (SLO)	September 3, 1995 (aged 19)
Urška Žigart (SLO)	December 4, 1996 (aged 18)
Eva Lechner (ITA)	July 1, 1985 (aged 29)

=== China Chongming-Liv-Champion System Pro Cycling ===
As of 10 March 2015. Ages as of 1 January 2015.

Rider	Date of birth
Jamie Wong (HKG)	November 4, 1986 (aged 28)
Meng Zhaojuan (HKG)	December 14, 1989 (aged 25)
Tian Yuanyuan (CHN)	July 3, 1992 (aged 22)
Jiang Xiujie (CHN)	January 5, 1989 (aged 25)
Zhang Nan (CHN)	March 5, 1989 (aged 25)
Li Wenjuan (CHN)	February 6, 1994 (aged 20)
Bai Yue (CHN)	December 13, 1992 (aged 22)
Huang Dongyan (CHN)	December 14, 1993 (aged 21)

Rider	Date of birth
Li Lixin (CHN)	February 15, 1989 (aged 25)
Wang Cui (CHN)	October 15, 1989 (aged 25)
Wang Wantong (CHN)	February 16, 1994 (aged 20)
Luo Xiaoling (CHN)	September 20, 1988 (aged 26)
Liang Hongyu (CHN)	October 23, 1990 (aged 24)
Liu Yanan (CHN)	February 25, 1992 (aged 22)
Jiaqi Li (CHN)	July 27, (1995 or 1996) (aged 18 or 19)
Zhao Xisha (CHN)	September 28, 1992 (aged 22)

=== Feminine Cycling Team ===
As of 10 March 2015. Ages as of 1 January 2015.

Rider	Date of birth
Corine van der Zijden (NED)	November 16, 1995 (aged 19)
Lotte van Hoek (NED)	August 8, 1991 (aged 23)
Annabell Oeschger (GER)	November 1, 1993 (aged 21)
Jacqueline Hahn (AUT)	July 21, 1991 (aged 23)

Rider	Date of birth
Stéphanie Borchers (GER)	May 3, 1989 (aged 25)
Jacqueline Dietrich (GER)	October 10, 1996 (aged 18)
Désirée Ehrler (SUI)	August 20, 1991 (aged 23)
Sophie Lacher (GER)	August 25, 1995 (aged 19)

=== Hitec Products ===
As of 10 March 2015. Ages as of 1 January 2015.

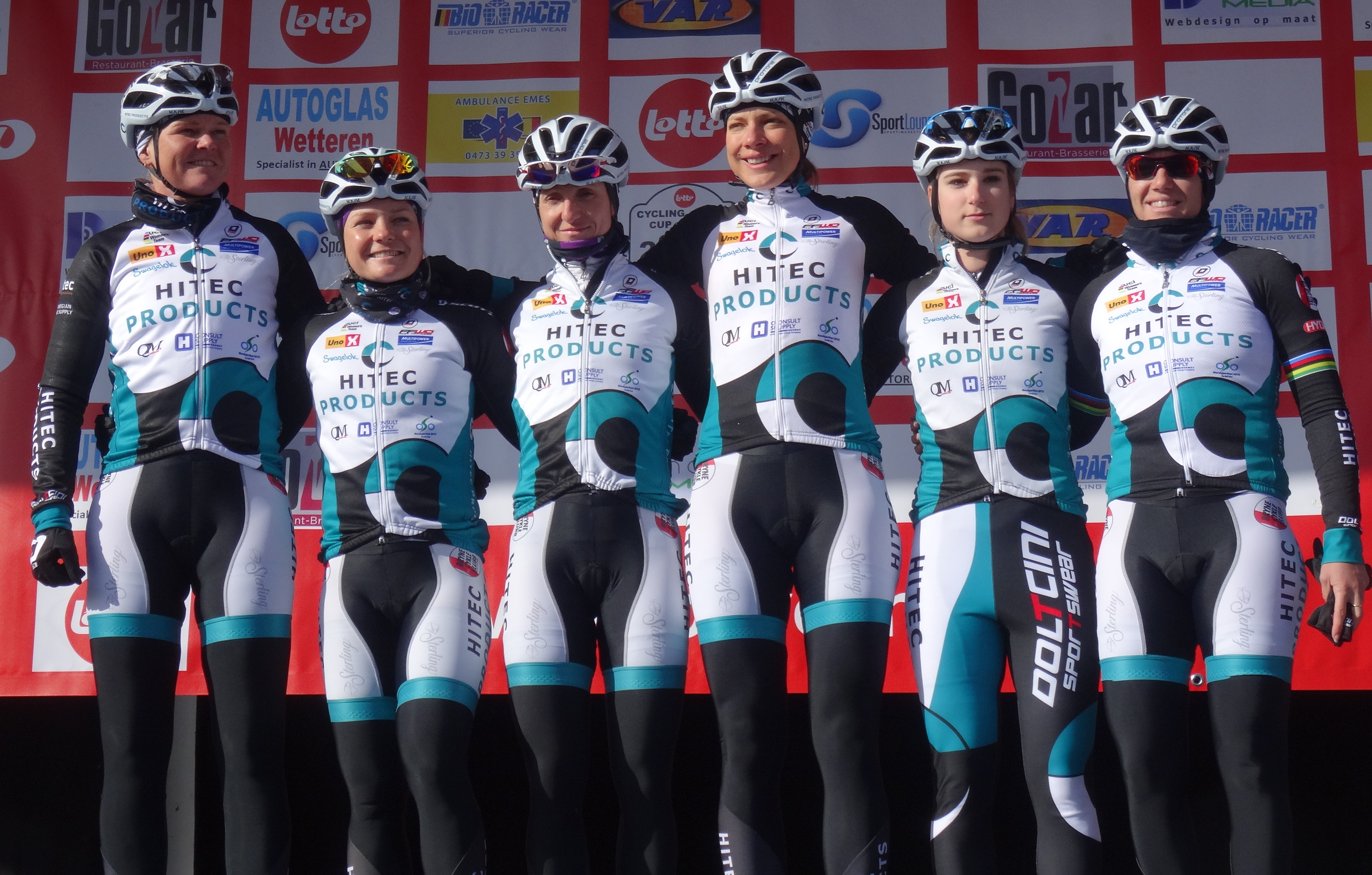
The squad during the 2015 Le Samyn des Dames

Rider	Date of birth
Charlotte Becker (GER)	May 19, 1983 (aged 31)
Lauren Kitchen (AUS)	November 21, 1990 (aged 24)
Shana Van Glabeke (BEL)	September 28, 1993 (aged 21)
Julie Leth (DEN)	July 13, 1992 (aged 22)
Tatiana Guderzo (ITA)	August 22, 1984 (aged 30)
Miriam Bjørnsrud (NOR)	October 9, 1992 (aged 22)

Rider	Date of birth
Emilie Moberg (NOR)	July 12, 1991 (aged 23)
Thea Thorsen (NOR)	March 15, 1992 (aged 22)
Tone Hatteland Lima (NOR)	December 18, 1979 (aged 35)
Cecilie Gotaas Johnsen (NOR)	April 20, 1976 (aged 38)
Vita Heine (NOR)	November 21, 1984 (aged 30)
Kirsten Wild (NED)	October 15, 1982 (aged 32)

=== Inpa Sottoli Giusfredi ===
As of 10 March 2015. Ages as of 1 January 2015.

Rider	Date of birth
Tetyana Ryabchenko (UKR)	August 28, 1989 (aged 25)
Claudia Cretti (ITA)	May 24, 1996 (aged 18)
Valentina Bastianelli (ITA)	December 4, 1987 (aged 27)
Anna Trevisi (ITA)	May 8, 1992 (aged 22)
Liisi Rist (EST)	June 25, 1991 (aged 23)
Daiva Tušlaitė (LTU)	June 18, 1986 (aged 28)

Rider	Date of birth
Ane Santesteban (ESP)	December 12, 1990 (aged 24)
Rossella Ratto (ITA)	October 20, 1993 (aged 21)
Angela Maffeis (ITA)	May 24, 1996 (aged 18)
Anna Zita Maria Stricker (ITA)	July 3, 1994 (aged 20)
Alice Maria Arzuffi (ITA)	November 19, 1994 (aged 20)

=== Itau Shimano Ladies Power Team ===
As of 10 March 2015. Ages as of 1 January 2015.

Rider	Date of birth
Estefania Pilz (ARG)	August 7, 1985 (aged 29)
Julia Sanchez Parma (ARG)	December 14, 1990 (aged 24)
Maria Aldana Cetra (ARG)	July 17, 1980 (aged 34)
Cristina Irma Greve (ARG)	July 20, 1987 (aged 27)

Rider	Date of birth
Aranza Valentina Villalón Sánchez (CHI)	June 18, 1995 (aged 19)
Andreina Rivera (COL)	February 8, 1991 (aged 23)
Jessenia Meneses (COL)	June 18, 1995 (aged 19)
Rocio Parrado Guarnizo (COL)	November 29, 1982 (aged 32)

=== Lensworld.eu–Zannata ===
As of 10 March 2015. Ages as of 1 January 2015.

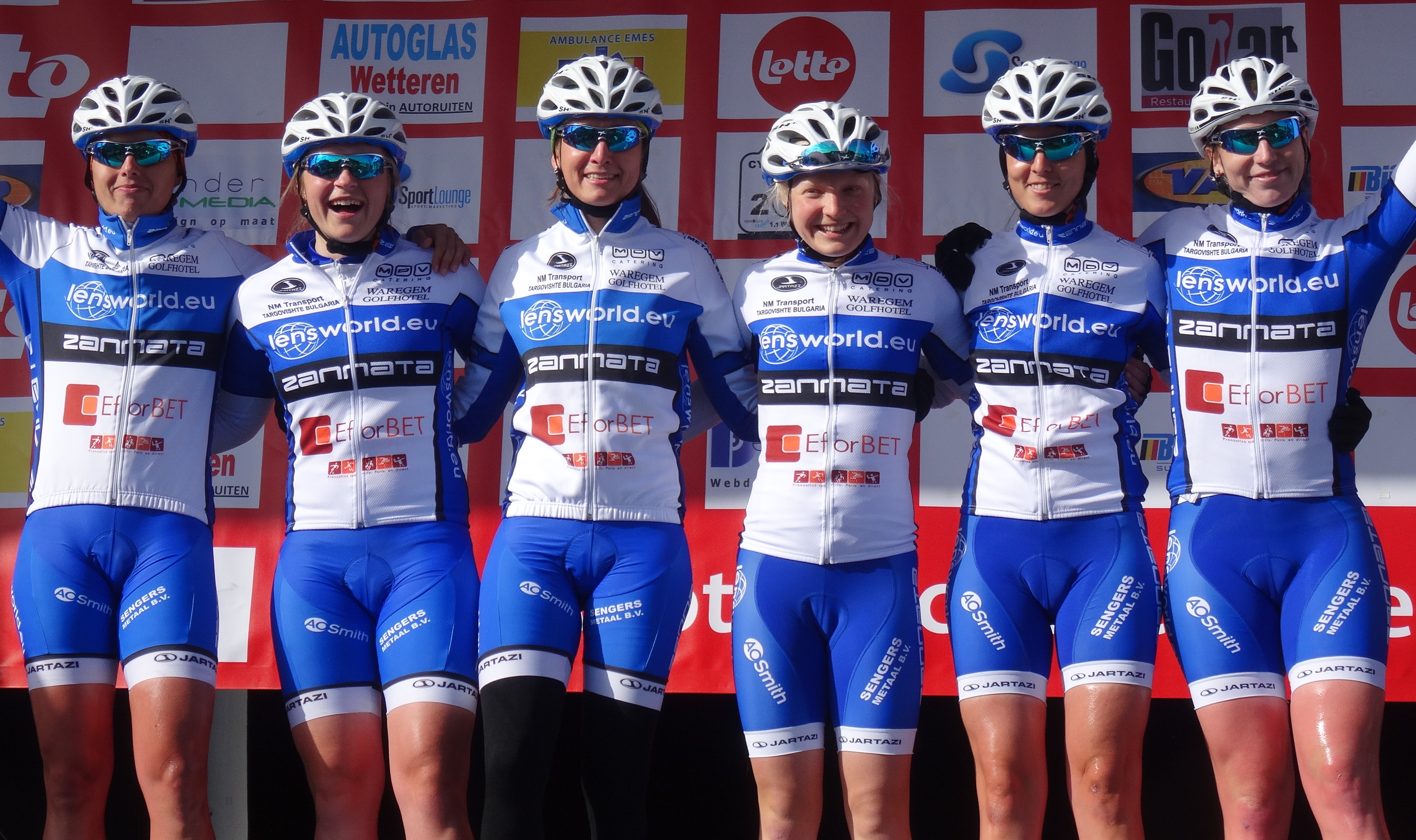
The squad during the 2015 Le Samyn des Dames

Rider	Date of birth
Sofie De Vuyst (BEL)	April 2, 1987 (aged 27)
Annelies Dom (BEL)	April 8, 1986 (aged 28)
Latoya Brulee (BEL)	December 9, 1988 (aged 26)
Annelies Van Doorslaer (BEL)	January 15, 1989 (aged 25)
Céline Van Severen (BEL)	September 17, 1993 (aged 21)
Kaat Van der Meulen (BEL)	June 22, 1995 (aged 19)

Rider	Date of birth
Nina Kessler (NED)	July 4, 1988 (aged 26)
Marissa Otten (NED)	July 11, 1989 (aged 25)
Evy Kuijpers (NED)	February 15, 1995 (aged 19)
Mariël Borgerink (NED)	March 28, 1992 (aged 22)
Kim De Baat (NED)	May 29, 1991 (aged 23)

=== Lointek ===
As of 10 March 2015. Ages as of 1 January 2015.

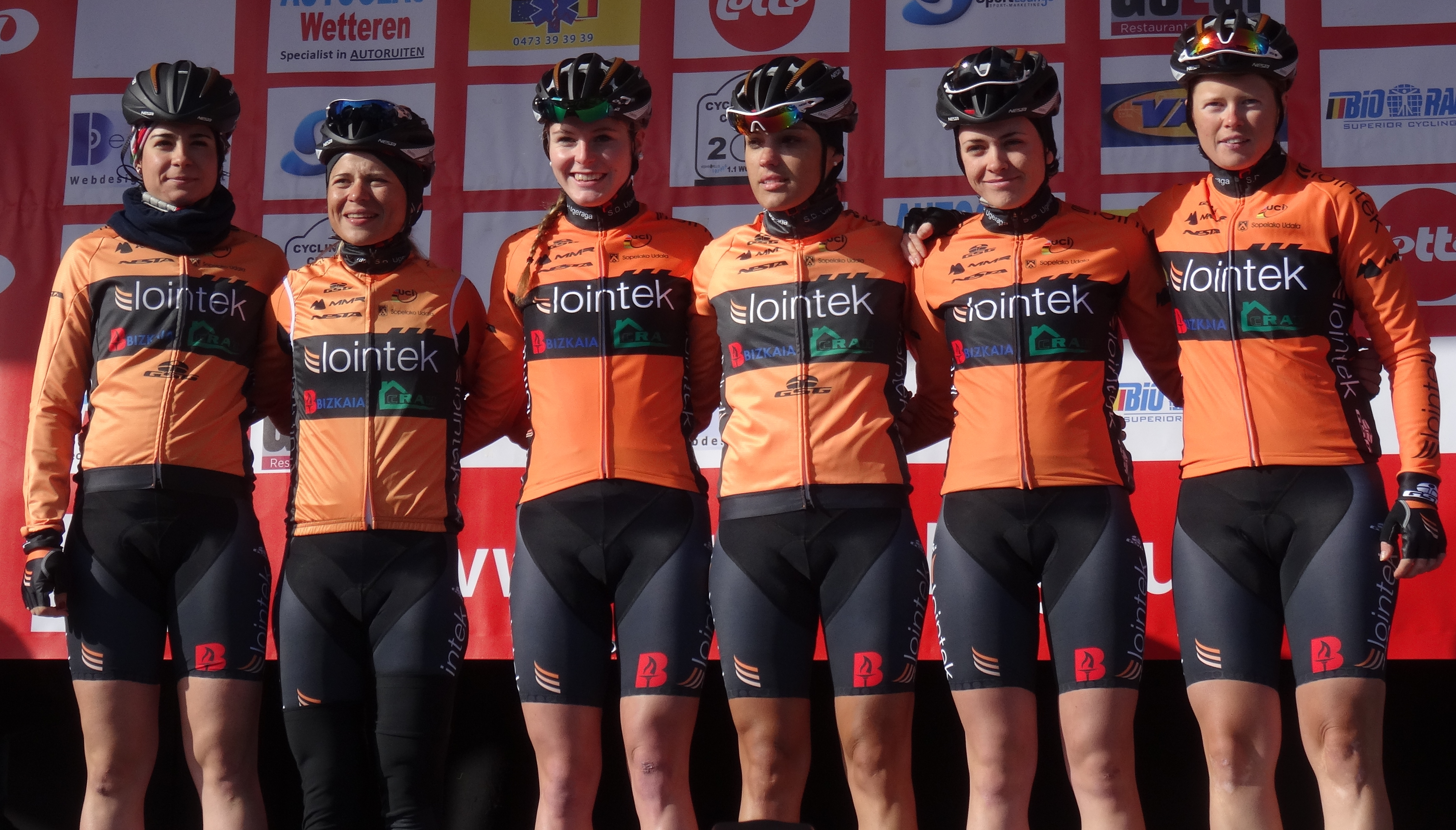
The squad during the 2015 Le Samyn des Dames

Rider	Date of birth
Mélodie Lesueur (FRA)	March 12, 1990 (aged 24)
Lucía González Blanco (ESP)	July 9, 1990 (aged 24)
Fanny Riberot (FRA)	March 17, 1983 (aged 31)
Soline Lamboley (FRA)	October 11, 1996 (aged 18)
Alicia González Blanco (ESP)	May 27, 1995 (aged 19)
Cristina Martínez (ESP)	January 2, 1996 (aged 18)

Rider	Date of birth
Aurore Verhoeven (FRA)	January 15, 1990 (aged 24)
Belén López Morales (ESP)	April 18, 1984 (aged 30)
Sheyla Gutiérrez Ruiz (ESP)	January 1, 1994 (aged 21)
Alba Teruel Ribes (ESP)	August 17, 1996 (aged 18)
Eider Merino Cortazar (ESP)	August 2, 1994 (aged 20)
Evelyn García (ESA)	December 29, 1982 (aged 32)

=== Lotto Soudal Ladies ===
As of 10 March 2015. Ages as of 1 January 2015.

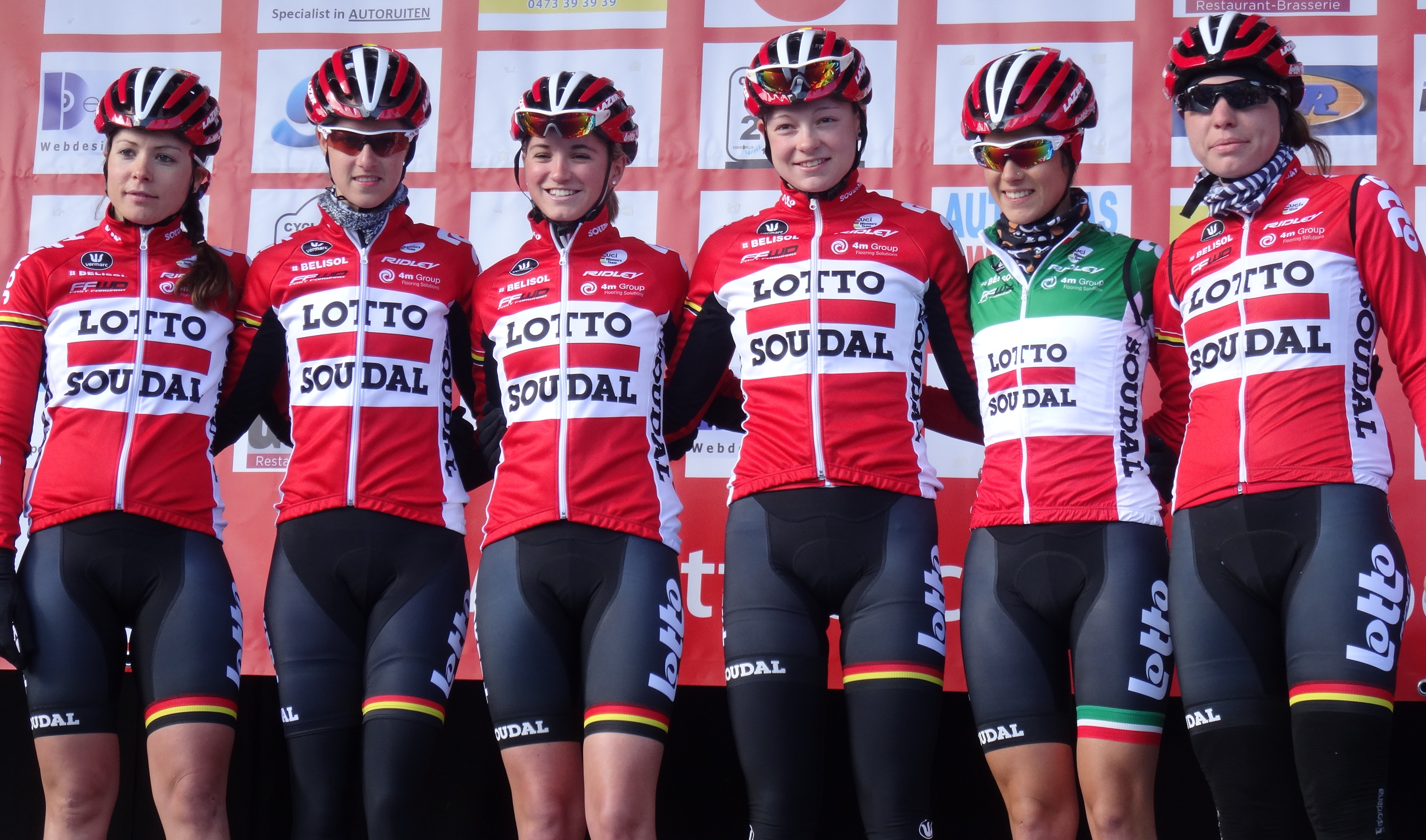
The squad during the 2015 Le Samyn des Dames

Rider	Date of birth
Jacquelina Alvarez (ARG)	August 21, 1989 (aged 25)
Carlee Taylor (AUS)	February 15, 1989 (aged 25)
Amy Cure (AUS)	December 31, 1992 (aged 22)
Sarah Rijkes (AUT)	April 2, 1991 (aged 23)
Isabelle Beckers (BEL)	March 4, 1983 (aged 31)
Liesbet De Vocht (BEL)	January 5, 1979 (aged 35)
Lieselot Decroix (BEL)	May 12, 1987 (aged 27)
Jesse Vandenbulcke (BEL)	January 17, 1996 (aged 18)

Rider	Date of birth
Anisha Vekemans (BEL)	August 17, 1991 (aged 23)
Molly Meyvisch (BEL)	October 27, 1995 (aged 19)
Jessie Daams (BEL)	May 28, 1990 (aged 24)
Marion Rousse (FRA)	August 17, 1991 (aged 23)
Susanna Zorzi (ITA)	March 13, 1992 (aged 22)
Elena Cecchini (ITA)	May 25, 1992 (aged 22)
Chantal Hoffmann (LUX)	October 30, 1987 (aged 27)
Anouk Rijff (NED)	April 6, 1996 (aged 18)

=== Matrix Fitness Pro Cycling ===
As of 10 March 2015. Ages as of 1 January 2015.

Rider	Date of birth
Christina Siggaard (DEN)	March 24, 1994 (aged 20)
Penny Rowson (GBR)	May 3, 1992 (aged 22)
Lucy Martin (GBR)	May 5, 1990 (aged 24)
Elinor Barker (GBR)	September 7, 1994 (aged 20)
Molly Weaver (Note: Weaver left the team on 31 May.) (GBR)	March 15, 1994 (aged 20)

Rider	Date of birth
Melissa Lowther (GBR)	May 15, 1996 (aged 18)
Harriet Owen (GBR)	December 16, 1993 (aged 21)
Jessie Walker (GBR)	September 20, 1994 (aged 20)
Laura Trott (GBR)	April 24, 1992 (aged 22)
Sara Olsson (SWE)	March 6, 1990 (aged 24)

=== No Radunion Vitalogic ===
As of 10 March 2015. Ages as of 1 January 2015.

Rider	Date of birth
Julia Deuerlein (GER)	May 1, 1990 (aged 24)
Alisa Van Oijen (AUT)	October 1, 1992 (aged 22)
Christina Perchtold (AUT)	May 11, 1993 (aged 21)
Christina Kollmann (AUT)	March 14, 1988 (aged 26)

Rider	Date of birth
Elisabeth Riegler (AUT)	February 19, 1995 (aged 19)
Eva Wutti (AUT)	February 26, 1989 (aged 25)
Astrid Gassner (AUT)	October 30, 1995 (aged 19)
Laura Simenc (SLO)	July 25, 1990 (aged 24)

=== Optum p/b Kelly Benefit Strategies ===
As of 10 March 2015. Ages as of 1 January 2015.

Rider	Date of birth
Ariane Horbach (GER)	November 15, 1993 (aged 21)
Lex Albrecht (CAN)	April 6, 1987 (aged 27)
Jasmin Glaesser (CAN)	July 8, 1992 (aged 22)
Annie Ewart (CAN)	September 29, 1993 (aged 21)
Leah Kirchmann (CAN)	June 30, 1990 (aged 24)

Rider	Date of birth
Janel Holcomb (USA)	December 2, 1978 (aged 36)
Alison Tetrick (USA)	April 4, 1985 (aged 29)
Maura Kinsella (USA)	July 8, 1991 (aged 23)
Brianna Walle (USA)	April 25, 1984 (aged 30)
Amy Charity (USA)	November 25, 1976 (aged 38)

=== Orica–AIS ===
As of 10 March 2015. Ages as of 1 January 2015.

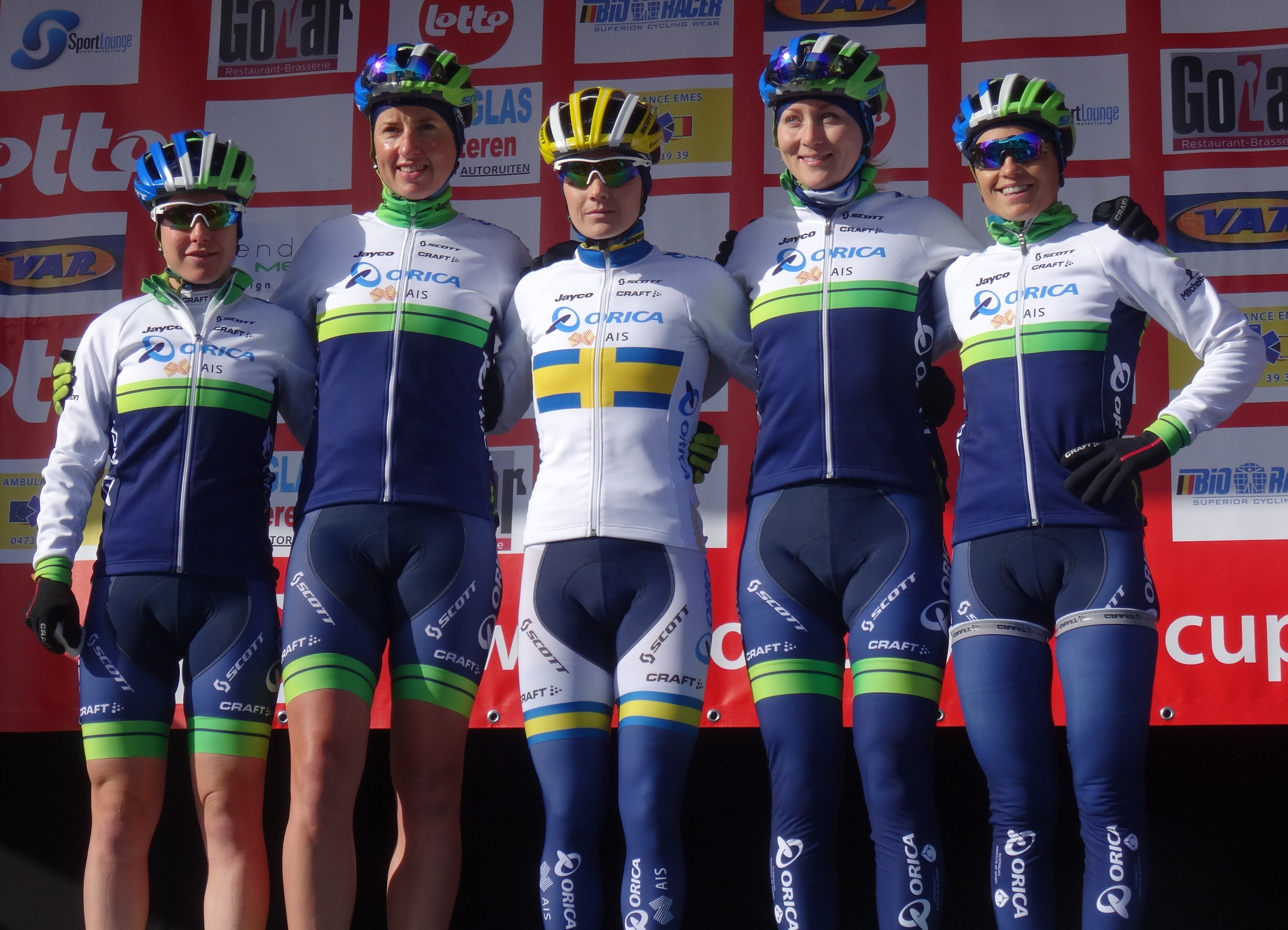
The squad during the 2015 Le Samyn des Dames

Rider	Date of birth
Chloe McConville (AUS)	October 1, 1987 (aged 27)
Katrin Garfoot (AUS)	October 8, 1981 (aged 33)
Lizzie Williams (AUS)	August 15, 1983 (aged 31)
Macey Stewart (AUS)	January 16, 1996 (aged 18)
Amanda Spratt (AUS)	September 17, 1987 (aged 27)
Melissa Hoskins (AUS)	February 24, 1991 (aged 23)

Rider	Date of birth
Sarah Roy (AUS)	February 27, 1986 (aged 28)
Alexandra Manly (AUS)	February 28, 1996 (aged 18)
Gracie Elvin (AUS)	October 31, 1988 (aged 26)
Valentina Scandolara (ITA)	May 1, 1990 (aged 24)
Loes Gunnewijk (NED)	November 27, 1980 (aged 34)
Emma Johansson (SWE)	September 23, 1983 (aged 31)

=== Parkhotel Valkenburg Continental Team ===
As of 1 January 2015. Ages as of 1 January 2015.

Rider	Date of birth
Sophie de Boer (NED)	December 12, 1990 (aged 24)
Janneke Ensing (NED)	September 21, 1986 (aged 28)
Ilona Hoeksma (NED)	May 22, 1991 (aged 23)
Riejanne Markus (NED)	September 1, 1994 (aged 20)
Jermaine Post (NED)	June 10, 1992 (aged 22)
Pauliena Rooijakkers (NED)	May 12, 1993 (aged 21)

Rider	Date of birth
Rozanne Slik (NED)	April 12, 1991 (aged 23)
Chanella Stougje (NED)	October 23, 1996 (aged 18)
Jip van den Bos (NED)	April 12, 1996 (aged 18)
Bianca van den Hoek (NED)	July 28, 1976 (aged 38)
Natalie van Gogh (NED)	September 14, 1974 (aged 40)
Marijn de Vries (NED)	19 November 1978 (aged 36)

=== Pepper Palace p/b The Happy Tooth ===
As of 10 March 2015. Ages as of 1 January 2015.

Rider	Date of birth
Julie Emmerman (USA)	April 9, 1976 (aged 38)
Amy Phillips (USA)	September 30, 1973 (aged 41)
Laura Jorgensen (USA)	August 4, 1986 (aged 28)
Julie Kuliecza (USA)	November 4, 1980 (aged 34)
Tina Mayolo Pic (USA)	May 9, 1966 (aged 48)
Amanda Miller (USA)	December 13, 1986 (aged 28)

Rider	Date of birth
Amber Pierce (USA)	March 25, 1981 (aged 33)
Meredith Miller (USA)	December 26, 1973 (aged 41)
Christina Gokey-Smith (USA)	November 28, 1973 (aged 41)
Lindsay Bayer (USA)	October 31, 1984 (aged 30)
Courteney Lowe (NZL)	March 26, 1991 (aged 23)
Sarah Caravella (USA)	May 31, 1979 (aged 35)

=== Poitou–Charentes.Futuroscope.86 ===
As of 10 March 2015. Ages as of 1 January 2015.

Rider	Date of birth
Pascale Jeuland (FRA)	June 2, 1987 (aged 27)
Eugénie Duval (FRA)	May 3, 1993 (aged 21)
Roxane Fournier (FRA)	November 7, 1991 (aged 23)
Greta Richioud (FRA)	October 11, 1996 (aged 18)
Charlotte Bravard (FRA)	January 12, 1992 (aged 22)

Rider	Date of birth
Amélie Rivat (FRA)	November 14, 1989 (aged 25)
Lucie Pader (FRA)	December 21, 1992 (aged 22)
Séverine Eraud (FRA)	February 24, 1995 (aged 19)
Aude Biannic (FRA)	March 27, 1991 (aged 23)

=== Rabo–Liv Women Cycling Team ===
As of 1 January 2016. Ages as of 1 January 2016.

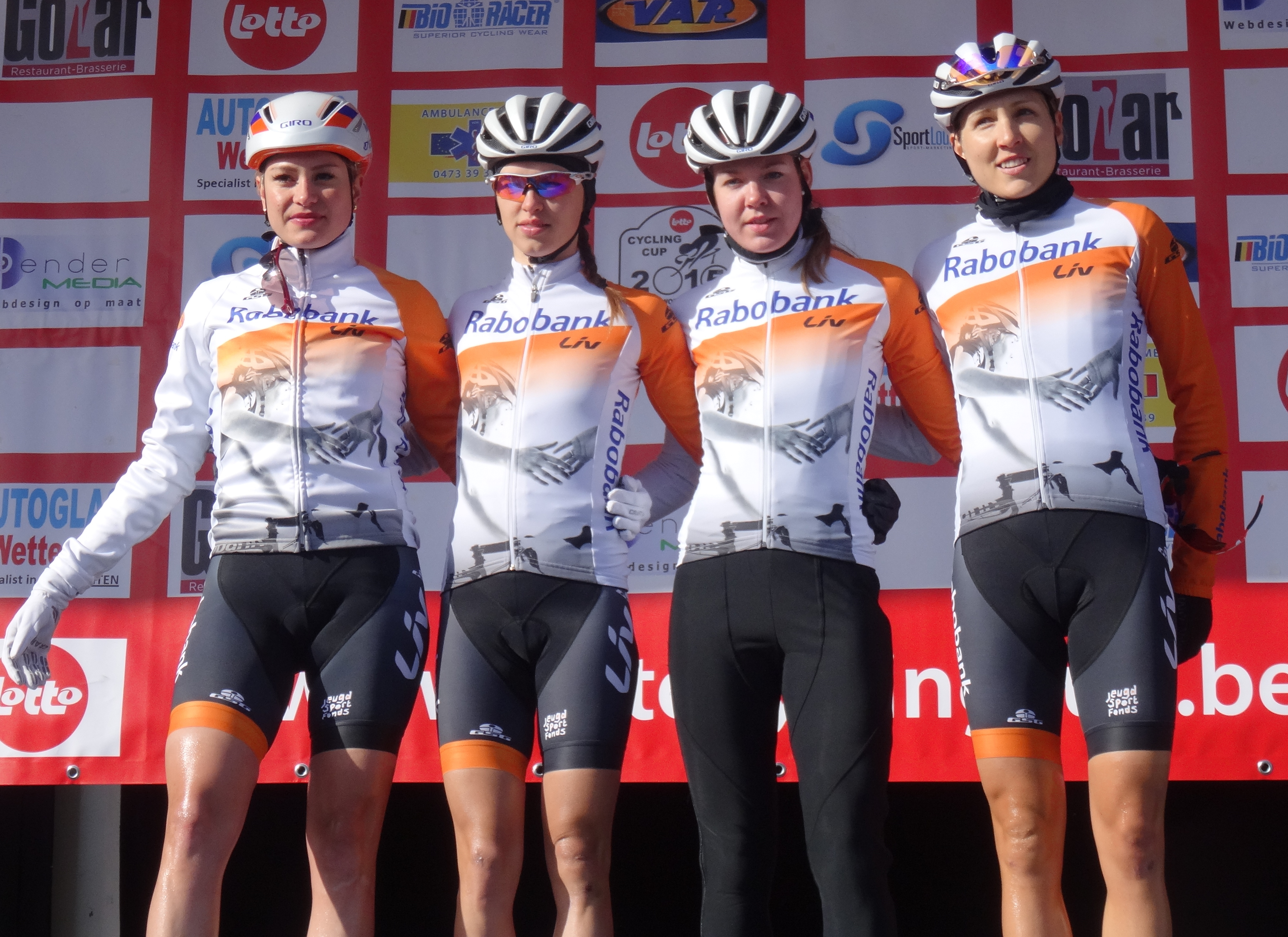
The squad during the 2015 Le Samyn des Dames

Rider	Date of birth
Marianne Vos (NED)	May 13, 1987 (aged 28)
Anna van der Breggen (NED)	April 18, 1990 (aged 25)
Roxane Knetemann (NED)	April 1, 1987 (aged 28)
Lucinda Brand (NED)	July 2, 1989 (aged 26)
Thalita de Jong (NED)	November 6, 1993 (aged 22)
Anouska Koster (NED)	August 20, 1993 (aged 22)

Rider	Date of birth
Moniek Tenniglo (NED)	May 2, 1988 (aged 27)
Jeanne Korevaar (NED)	September 24, 1996 (aged 19)
Pauline Ferrand-Prévot (FRA)	February 10, 1992 (aged 23)
Katarzyna Niewiadoma (POL)	September 29, 1994 (aged 21)
Shara Gillow (AUS)	December 23, 1986 (aged 29)

=== S.C. Michela Fanini Rox ===
As of 10 March 2015. Ages as of 1 January 2015.

Rider	Date of birth
Francesca Balducci (ITA)	May 1, 1996 (aged 18)
Azzurra D'Intino (ITA)	October 25, 1991 (aged 23)
Alessandra Lari (ITA)	April 25, 1985 (aged 29)
Edwige Pitel (FRA)	June 4, 1967 (aged 47)
Michela Balducci (ITA)	July 30, 1995 (aged 19)
Lara Vieceli (ITA)	July 16, 1993 (aged 21)

Rider	Date of birth
Vittoria Reati (ITA)	July 26, 1996 (aged 18)
Eyerusalem Kelil (ETH)	January 21, 1992 (aged 22)
Laura Camila Lozano Ramirez (COL)	October 25, 1986 (aged 28)
Nina Gulino (ITA)	February 18, 1988 (aged 26)
Federica Nicolai (ITA)	March 2, 1995 (aged 19)

=== Servetto Footon ===
As of 10 March 2015. Ages as of 1 January 2015.

Rider	Date of birth
Tatiana Antoshina (RUS)	July 27, 1982 (aged 32)
Elena Kuchinskaya (RUS)	December 11, 1984 (aged 30)
Veronica Cornolti (ITA)	December 30, 1994 (aged 20)
Marina Likhanova (RUS)	October 27, 1990 (aged 24)
Riccarda Mazzotta (SUI)	June 8, 1986 (aged 28)
Michela Pavin (ITA)	July 15, 1994 (aged 20)
Anna Potokina (RUS)	June 18, 1987 (aged 27)

Rider	Date of birth
Silvia Folloni (ITA)	June 21, 1995 (aged 19)
Vittoria Bussi (ITA)	March 19, 1987 (aged 27)
Sari Saarelainen (FIN)	March 1, 1981 (aged 33)
Manuela Sonzogni (ITA)	June 30, 1985 (aged 29)
Elena Franchi (ITA)	August 26, 1996 (aged 18)
Daniela Lionço (BRA)	January 1, 1989 (aged 26)

=== Team Liv-Plantur ===
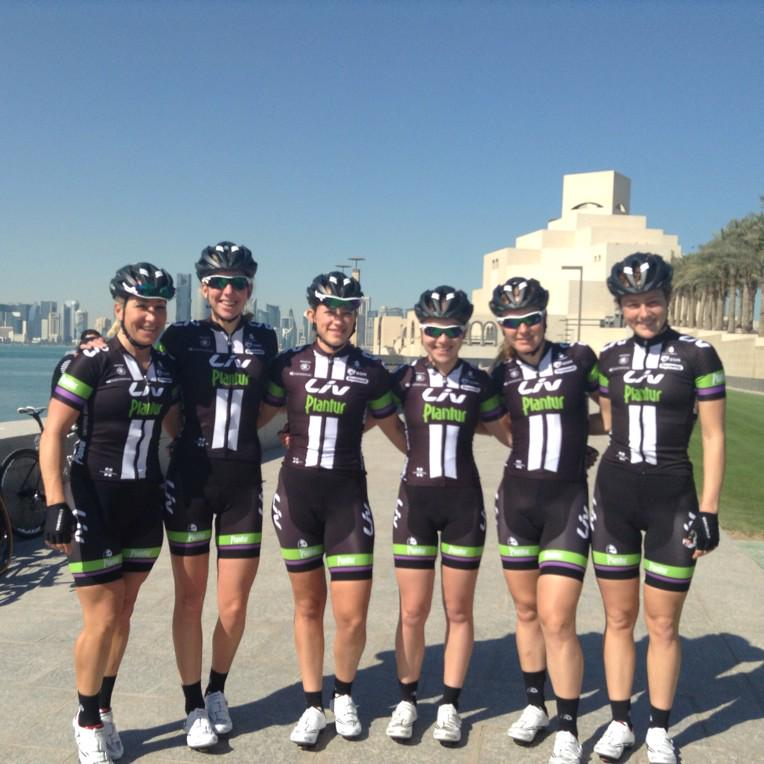
Squad during the 2015 Ladies Tour of Qatar

Ages as of 1 January 2015.

Rider	Date of birth
Lucy Garner (GBR)	20 September 1994 (aged 20)
Willeke Knol (NED)	10 April 1991 (aged 23)
Claudia Lichtenberg (GER)	17 November 1985 (aged 29)
Floortje Mackaij (NED)	18 October 1995 (aged 19)
Sara Mustonen (SWE)	8 February 1981 (aged 33)
Amy Pieters (NED)	June 1, 1991 (aged 23)

Rider	Date of birth
Maaike Polspoel (Note: Polspoel left the team on 15 May.) (BEL)	28 March 1989 (aged 25)
Julia Soek (NED)	December 12, 1990 (aged 24)
Kyara Stijns (NED)	9 October 1995 (aged 19)
Sabrina Stultiens (Note: Stultiens joined the team on 1 March.) (NED)	8 July 1993 (aged 21)
Molly Weaver (Note: Weaver joined the team on 1 June.) (GBR)	15 March 1994 (aged 20)

=== Team Rytger ===
As of 10 March 2015. Ages as of 1 January 2015.

Rider	Date of birth
Kamilla Sofie Vallin (DEN)	18 August 1993 (aged 21)
Nina Krebs Ovesen (DEN)	20 February 1996 (aged 18)
Cecilie Uttrup Ludwig (DEN)	23 August 1995 (aged 19)
Olivia Overskov Jakobsen (DEN)	29 September 1996 (aged 18)
Amy Hill (GBR)	4 July 1995 (aged 19)

Rider	Date of birth
Chloe Fraser (GBR)	20 September 1993 (aged 21)
Kelly Markus (NED)	7 February 1993 (aged 21)
Melanie Woering (NED)	18 January 1992 (aged 22)
Henriette Woering (NED)	18 January 1992 (aged 22)
Ellinor Huusko (SWE)	17 December 1996 (aged 18)

=== Team TIBCO-SVB ===
As of 10 March 2015. Ages as of 1 January 2015.

Rider	Date of birth
Kathrin Hammes (GER)	January 9, 1989 (aged 25)
Anika Todd (CAN)	March 11, 1990 (aged 24)
Alizée Brien (CAN)	September 27, 1993 (aged 21)
Sara Headley (USA)	April 5, 1985 (aged 29)
Kendall Ryan (USA)	August 10, 1992 (aged 22)
Kristabel Doebel-Hickok (USA)	April 28, 1989 (aged 25)

Rider	Date of birth
Lauren Stephens (USA)	December 28, 1986 (aged 28)
Emily Collins (NZL)	September 16, 1990 (aged 24)
Joanne Kiesanowski (NZL)	May 24, 1979 (aged 35)
Patricia Schwager (SUI)	December 6, 1983 (aged 31)
Joanne Hogan (AUS)	June 9, 1982 (aged 32)

=== Top Girls Fassa Bortolo ===
As of 10 March 2015. Ages as of 1 January 2015.

Rider	Date of birth
Elena Leonardi (ITA)	December 7, 1995 (aged 19)
Chiara Pierobon (ITA)	January 21, 1993 (aged 21)
Irene Bitto (ITA)	November 2, 1993 (aged 21)
Sara Grifi (ITA)	September 26, 1988 (aged 26)
Nicole Dal Santo (ITA)	August 25, 1995 (aged 19)

Rider	Date of birth
Jennifer Fiori (ITA)	March 23, 1986 (aged 28)
Asja Paladin (ITA)	September 27, 1994 (aged 20)
Rossella Callovi (ITA)	April 5, 1991 (aged 23)
Soraya Paladin (ITA)	May 4, 1993 (aged 21)

=== Topsport Vlaanderen–Pro-Duo ===
As of 10 March 2015. Ages as of 1 January 2015.

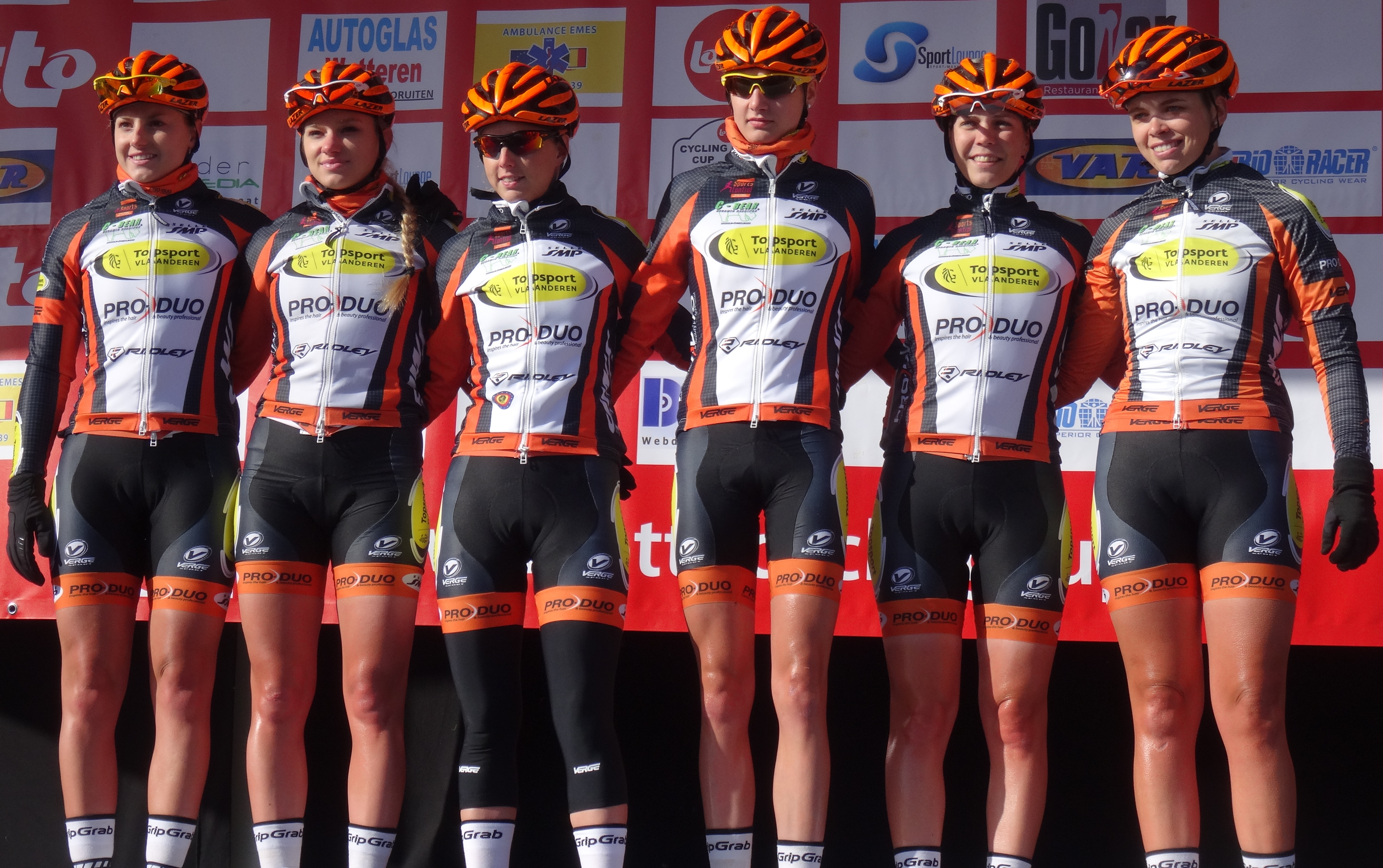
The squad during the 2015 Le Samyn des Dames

Rider	Date of birth
Kelly Van den Steen (BEL)	September 1, 1995 (aged 19)
Gilke Croket (BEL)	November 1, 1992 (aged 22)
Demmy Druyts (BEL)	October 4, 1995 (aged 19)
Nel De Crits (BEL)	April 9, 1991 (aged 23)
Lotte Kopecky (BEL)	November 10, 1995 (aged 19)
Nicky Degrendele (BEL)	October 11, 1996 (aged 18)
Saartje Vandenbroucke (BEL)	February 13, 1996 (aged 18)

Rider	Date of birth
Fien Delbaere (BEL)	April 21, 1996 (aged 18)
Evelyn Arys (BEL)	July 21, 1990 (aged 24)
Kelly Druyts (BEL)	October 21, 1989 (aged 25)
Kaat Hannes (BEL)	November 21, 1991 (aged 23)
Jessy Druyts (BEL)	January 22, 1994 (aged 20)
Ann-Sophie Duyck (BEL)	July 23, 1987 (aged 27)
Steffy Van Den Haute (BEL)	November 29, 1993 (aged 21)

=== Twenty16 presented by Sho-Air ===
As of 10 May 2015. Ages as of 1 January 2015.

Rider	Date of birth
Alison Jackson (CAN)	December 14, 1988 (aged 26)
Kaitlin Antonneau (USA)	January 1, 1992 (aged 23)
Jessica Cerra (USA)	May 1, 1982 (aged 32)
Lauren Hall (USA)	February 2, 1979 (aged 35)
Andrea Dvorak (USA)	October 9, 1980 (aged 34)
Amber Gaffney (USA)	December 27, 1982 (aged 32)

Rider	Date of birth
Lauren Komanski (USA)	June 17, 1985 (aged 29)
Allie Dragoo (USA)	December 17, 1989 (aged 25)
Allison Arensman (USA)	March 19, 1994 (aged 20)
Carmen Small (USA)	April 20, 1980 (aged 34)
Leah Thomas (USA)	May 30, 1989 (aged 25)
Kristin Armstrong (USA)	August 11, 1973 (aged 41)

=== UnitedHealthcare Professional Cycling Team ===
As of 10 March 2015. Ages as of 1 January 2015.

Rider	Date of birth
Hannah Barnes (GBR)	May 4, 1993 (age 33)
Laura Brown (CAN)	November 27, 1986 (age 39)
Rushlee Buchanan (NZL)	January 20, 1988 (age 38)
Katie Hall (USA)	January 6, 1987 (age 39)
Cari Higgins (USA)	October 5, 1976 (age 50)
Abigail Mickey (USA)	July 3, 1994 (age 32)
Coryn Rivera (USA)	August 26, 1992 (age 34)

Rider	Date of birth
Alexis Ryan (USA)	August 18, 1994 (age 32)
Lauren Tamayo (USA)	October 25, 1983 (age 42)
Linda Villumsen (NZL)	April 9, 1985 (age 41)
Scotti Wilborne (USA)	January 7, 1983 (age 43)
Ruth Winder (USA)	July 9, 1993 (age 33)

=== Vaiano Fondriest ===
As of 10 March 2015. Ages as of 1 January 2015.

Rider	Date of birth
Ewelina Szybiak (POL)	September 13, 1989 (aged 25)
Miriam Romei (ITA)	November 22, 1995 (aged 19)
Martina Biolo (ITA)	January 12, 1996 (aged 18)
Jessica Parra (COL)	August 10, 1995 (aged 19)
Alessia Martini (ITA)	January 10, 1992 (aged 22)

Rider	Date of birth
Allison Elizabeth Linnell (USA)	May 2, 1992 (aged 22)
Sérika Gulumá (COL)	July 16, 1990 (aged 24)
Lija Laizāne (LAT)	July 6, 1993 (aged 21)
Marta Bastianelli (ITA)	April 30, 1987 (aged 27)
Rasa Leleivytė (LTU)	July 22, 1988 (aged 26)

=== Velocio-SRAM ===
As of 10 March 2015. Ages as of 1 January 2015.

Rider	Date of birth
Tiffany Cromwell (AUS)	July 6, 1988 (aged 26)
Tayler Wiles (USA)	July 20, 1989 (aged 25)
Barbara Guarischi (ITA)	October 2, 1990 (aged 24)
Trixi Worrack (GER)	September 28, 1981 (aged 33)
Alena Amialiusik (BLR)	February 6, 1989 (aged 25)

Rider	Date of birth
Élise Delzenne (FRA)	January 28, 1989 (aged 25)
Lisa Brennauer (GER)	June 8, 1988 (aged 26)
Loren Rowney (AUS)	October 14, 1988 (aged 26)
Karol-Ann Canuel (CAN)	April 18, 1988 (aged 26)
Mieke Kröger (GER)	July 18, 1993 (aged 21)

=== Wiggle–Honda ===
As of 10 March 2015. Ages as of 1 January 2015.

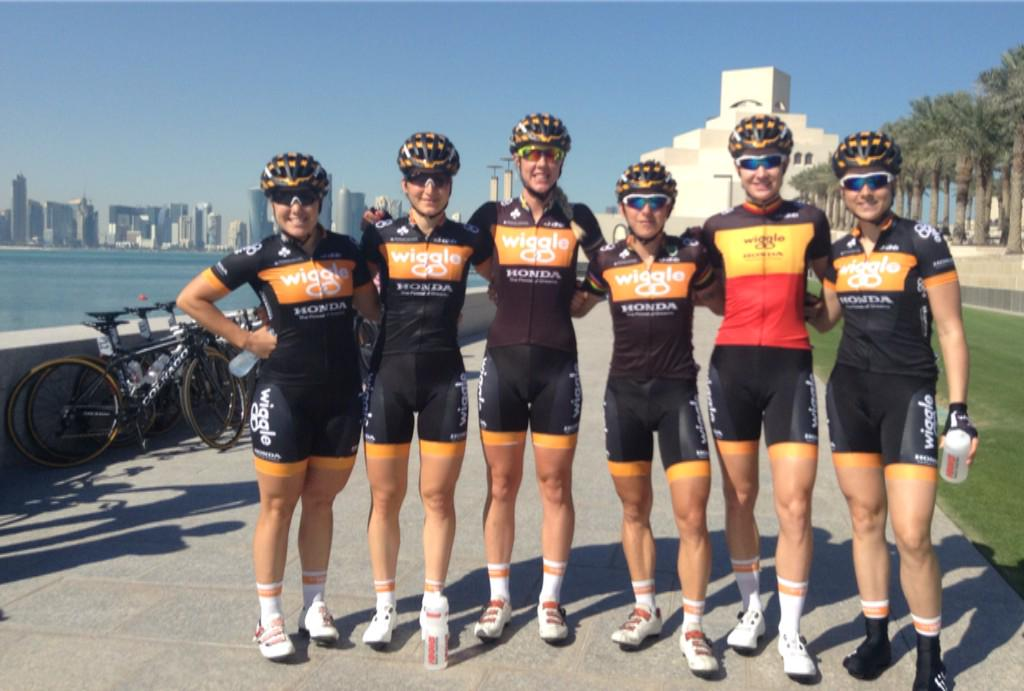
The squad during the 2015 Ladies Tour of Qatar

Rider	Date of birth
Mara Abbott (USA)	14 November 1985 (age 40)
Elisa Longo Borghini (ITA)	10 December 1991 (age 34)
Giorgia Bronzini (ITA)	3 August 1983 (age 43)
Anna Christian (GBR)	6 August 1995 (age 31)
Audrey Cordon (FRA)	22 September 1989 (age 37)
Jolien D'Hoore (BEL)	14 March 1990 (age 36)
Annette Edmondson (AUS)	12 December 1991 (age 34)
Emilia Fahlin (SWE)	24 October 1988 (age 37)
Rochelle Gilmore (AUS)	14 December 1981 (age 44)

Rider	Date of birth
Mayuko Hagiwara (JPN)	16 October 1986 (age 39)
Dani King (GBR)	21 November 1990 (age 35)
Peta Mullens (Note: Mullens joined the team on 11 January.) (AUS)	8 March 1988 (age 38)
Jessica Mundy (AUS)	25 September 1994 (age 32)
Amy Roberts (GBR)	24 December 1994 (age 31)
Eileen Roe (GBR)	24 September 1989 (age 37)
Anna Sanchis (ESP)	18 October 1987 (age 38)
Chloe Hosking (AUS)	1 October 1990 (age 36)
Rebecca Wiasak (AUS)	25 May 1984 (age 42)

Preceded by 2014	List of UCI Women's Teams; 2015	Succeeded by 2016
