= Tesa Vilar =

Slovenian cyclist

Personal information
- Born: 3 September 1995 (age 31)

Cycling career
- Sport: Cycling
- Role: Rider

Tesa Vilar (born 3 September 1995) is a former Slovenian professional racing cyclist. She rode for the BTC City Ljubljana team in the 2015 cycling season.

== See also ==
- List of 2015 UCI Women's Teams and riders
