= Stéphanie Borchers =

German cyclist

Personal information
- Born: 3 May 1989 (age 37)

Cycling career
- Sport: Cycling
- Role: Rider

Stéphanie Borchers (born 3 May 1989) is a German professional racing cyclist. She rides for the Feminine Cycling Team.

== See also ==
- List of 2015 UCI Women's Teams and riders
