= Nina Gulino =

Italian cyclist

Personal information
- Born: 18 February 1988 (age 38)

Cycling career
- Sport: Cycling
- Role: Rider

Nina Gulino (born 18 February 1988) is an Italian professional racing cyclist. She rides for the S.C. Michela Fanini Rox team.

== See also ==
- List of 2015 UCI Women's Teams and riders
