= Julia Deuerlein =

German cyclist (born 1990)

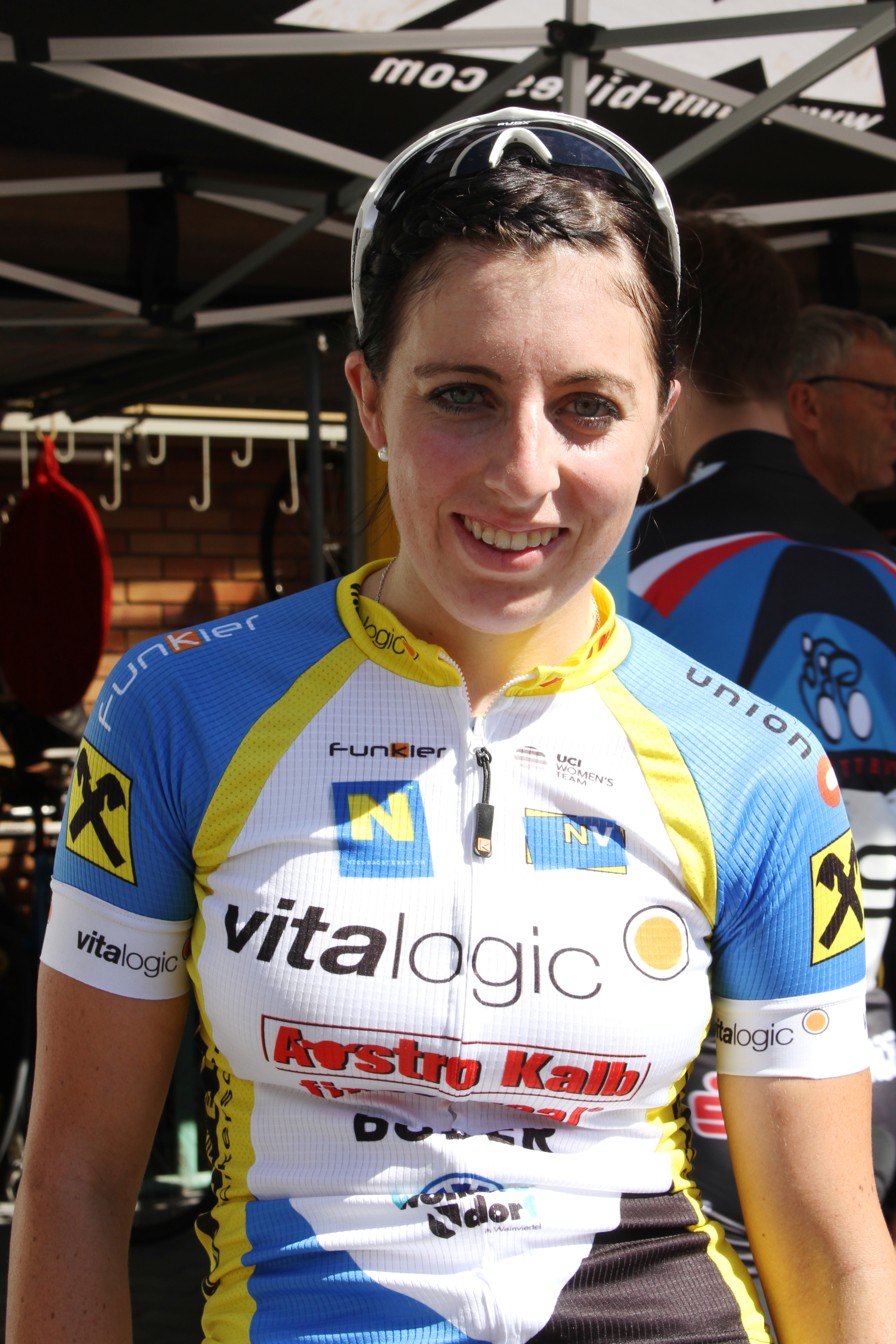
- Julia Deuerlein (2016)

Personal information
- Born: 1 May 1990 (age 36) Rosenheim, Germany

Cycling career
- Sport: Cycling
- Current team: Team ÖAMTC tomSiller RC Tirol
- Disciplines: Road and track cycling
- Role: Rider

Professional teams

Julia Deuerlein (born 1 May 1990) is a former German professional racing cyclist. She rides for the No Radunion Vitalogic team.

== See also ==
- List of 2015 UCI Women's Teams and riders
