= Paula Lanz Blazquez =

Spanish cyclist

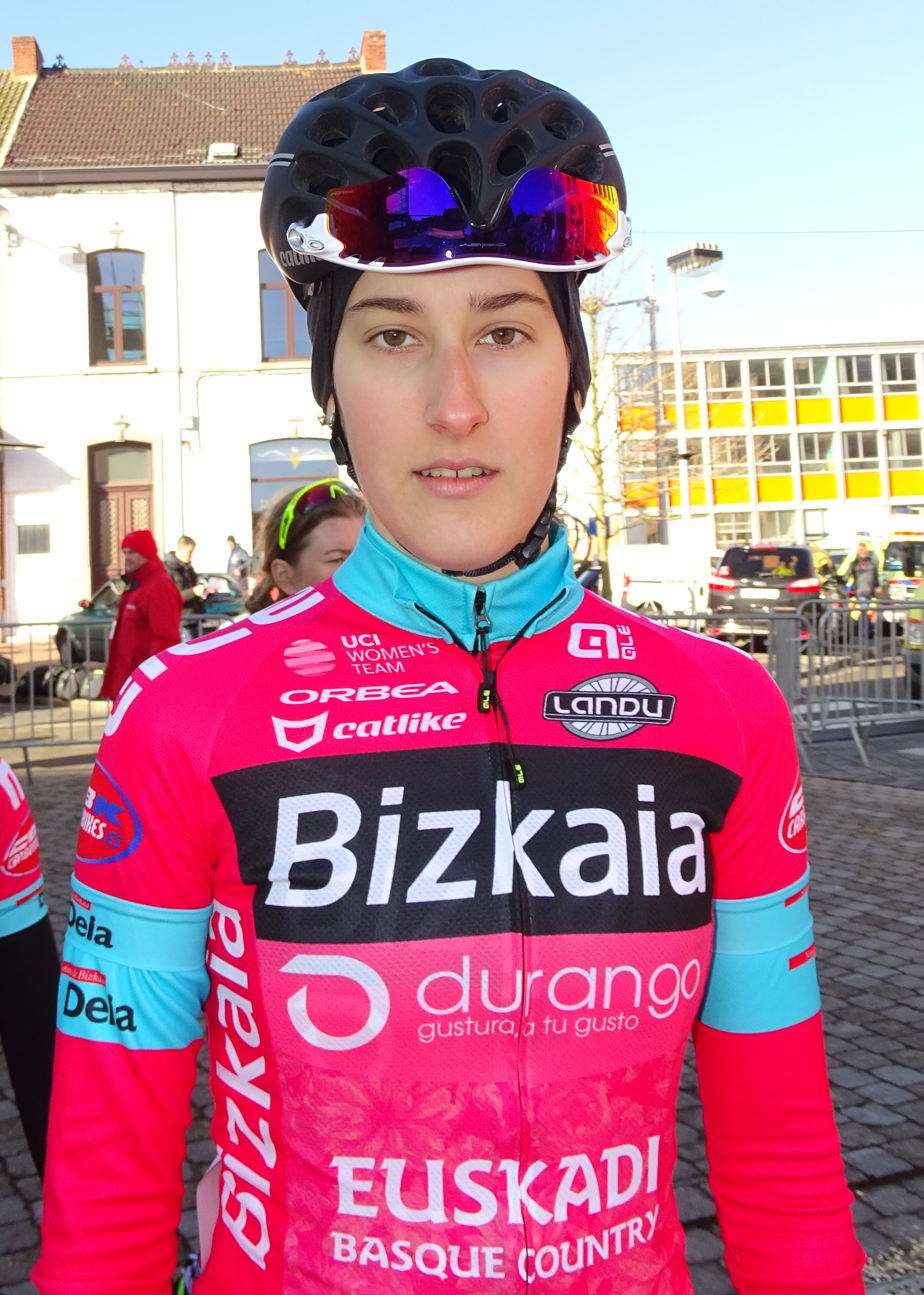

Personal information
- Born: 9 October 1996 (age 30)

Cycling career
- Sport: Cycling
- Role: Rider

Paula Lanz Blazquez (born 9 October 1996) is a Spanish professional racing cyclist. She rides for team Bizkaia–Durango.

== See also ==
- List of 2015 UCI Women's Teams and riders
