= Anja Rugelj =

Slovenian cyclist

Personal information
- Born: 25 June 1986 (age 40)

Cycling career
- Sport: Cycling
- Role: Rider

Anja Rugelj (born 25 June 1986) is a Slovenian professional racing cyclist.

== See also ==
- List of 2015 UCI Women's Teams and riders
