= Riccarda Mazzotta =

Swiss cyclist

Personal information
- Born: 8 June 1986 (age 40)

Cycling career
- Sport: Cycling
- Role: Rider

Riccarda Mazzotta (born 8 June 1986) is a Swiss professional racing cyclist. She rides for the Servetto Footon team.

== See also ==
- List of 2015 UCI Women's Teams and riders
