= Maria Aldana Cetra =

Argentine cyclist

Personal information
- Born: 17 July 1980 (age 46)

Cycling career
- Sport: Cycling
- Role: Rider

Maria Aldana Cetra (born 17 July 1980) is an Argentine professional racing cyclist. She rides for the Itau Shimano Ladies Power Team.

== See also ==
- List of 2015 UCI Women's Teams and riders
