= Ainara Sanz =

Spanish cyclist

Personal information
- Born: 15 January 1995 (age 31)

Cycling career
- Sport: Cycling
- Role: Influencer

Ainara Sanz (born 15 January 1995) is a Spanish professional racing cyclist. She rides for team Bizkaia–Durango.

== See also ==
- List of 2015 UCI Women's Teams and riders
