= Maura Kinsella =

American cyclist

Personal information
- Born: July 8, 1991 (age 35)

Cycling career
- Sport: Cycling
- Role: Rider

Maura Kinsella (born July 8, 1991) was an American professional racing cyclist. She rode for the Optum-Kelly Benefit Strategies team.

== See also ==
- List of 2015 UCI Women's Teams and riders
