= Alessandra Lari =

Italian cyclist

Personal information
- Born: 25 April 1985 (age 41)

Cycling career
- Sport: Cycling
- Role: Rider

Alessandra Lari (born 25 April 1985) is an Italian professional racing cyclist. She rides for the S.C. Michela Fanini Rox team.

== See also ==
- List of 2015 UCI Women's Teams and riders
