= Jacquelina Alvarez =

Argentine cyclist

Personal information
- Born: 21 August 1989 (age 37)

Cycling career
- Sport: Cycling
- Role: Rider

Jacquelina Alvarez (born 21 August 1989) is an Argentine professional racing cyclist. She rides for the Lotto-Soudal Ladies team.

== See also ==
- List of 2015 UCI Women's Teams and riders
