= Anita Žnidaršic =

Slovenian cyclist

Personal information
- Born: 1 March 1996 (age 30) Slovenia

Cycling career
- Sport: Cycling
- Role: Rider

Anita Žnidaršic (born 1 March 1996) is a Slovenian professional racing cyclist.

== See also ==
- List of 2015 UCI Women's Teams and riders
