= Shana Van Glabeke =

Belgian cyclist

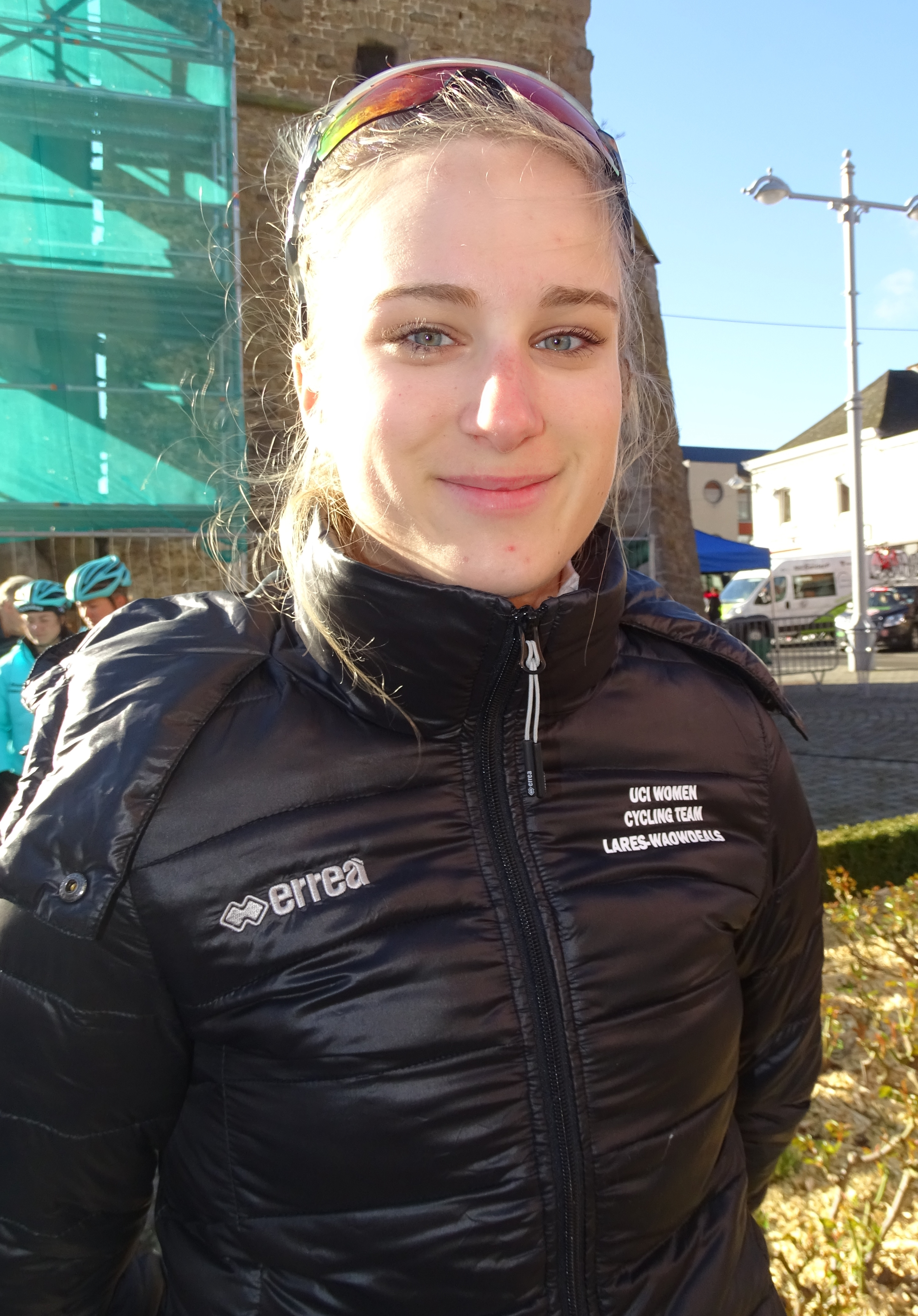

Personal information
- Born: 28 September 1993 (age 33) Ghent, Belgium

Cycling career
- Sport: Cycling
- Role: Rider

Professional teams
- 2015: Team Hitec Products
- 2016–2017: Lares–Waowdeals

Shana Van Glabeke (born 28 September 1993) is a Belgian former professional racing cyclist. In 2015 she rode for Team Hitec Products and in 2016 and 2017 for Lares–Waowdeals.

== See also ==
- List of 2015 UCI Women's Teams and riders
