= Vittoria Reati =

Italian cyclist

Personal information
- Born: 26 July 1996 (age 30)

Cycling career
- Sport: Cycling
- Role: Rider

Vittoria Reati (born 26 July 1996) is an Italian professional racing cyclist. She rides for the S.C. Michela Fanini Rox team.

== See also ==
- List of 2015 UCI Women's Teams and riders
