= Ariane Horbach =

German cyclist

Personal information
- Born: 15 November 1993 (age 32)
- Height: 5 ft 5 in (165 cm)
- Weight: 121 lb (55 kg)

Cycling career
- Sport: Cycling
- Current team: Human Powered Health
- Discipline: Road
- Role: Rider
- Rider type: All-rounder

Professional team
- 2015: Optum–KBS

Ariane Horbach (born 15 November 1993) is a German former professional racing cyclist. She rode for the Optum-Kelly Benefit Strategies team.

== See also ==
- List of 2015 UCI Women's Teams and riders
