= Manuela Sonzogni =

Italian cyclist

Personal information
- Born: 30 June 1985 (age 41)

Cycling career
- Sport: Cycling
- Role: Rider

Manuela Sonzogni (born 30 June 1985) is an Italian professional racing cyclist. She rides for the Servetto Footon team.

== See also ==
- List of 2015 UCI Women's Teams and riders
