= Nina Krebs Ovesen =

Danish cyclist

Personal information
- Born: 20 February 1996 (age 30)

Cycling career
- Sport: Cycling
- Role: Rider

Nina Krebs Ovesen (born 20 February 1996) is a Danish professional racing cyclist. She rides for Team Rytger.

== See also ==
- List of 2015 UCI Women's Teams and riders
