= Nicole Dal Santo =

Italian cyclist

Personal information
- Born: 25 August 1995 (age 31)

Cycling career
- Sport: Cycling
- Role: Rider

Nicole Dal Santo (born 25 August 1995) is an Italian professional racing cyclist. She rides for the Top Girls Fassa Bortolo team. She is also a model, reaching the final of the Miss Ciclismo 2016 competition.

== See also ==
- List of 2015 UCI Women's Teams and riders
