= Jacqueline Dietrich =

German cyclist

Personal information
- Born: 10 October 1996 (age 30)

Cycling career
- Sport: Cycling
- Role: Rider

Jacqueline Dietrich (born 10 October 1996) is a German professional racing cyclist. She rides for the Feminine Cycling Team.

== See also ==
- List of 2015 UCI Women's Teams and riders
