= Annabell Oeschger =

German cyclist

Personal information
- Born: 1 November 1993 (age 32)

Cycling career
- Sport: Cycling
- Role: Rider

Annabell Oeschger (born 1 November 1993) is a German professional racing cyclist. She rides for the Feminine Cycling Team.

== See also ==
- List of 2015 UCI Women's Teams and riders
