= Laura Šimenc =

Slovenian cyclist

Personal information
- Born: 25 July 1990 (age 36)

Cycling career
- Sport: Cycling
- Role: Rider

Laura Šimenc (born 25 July 1990) is a Slovenian professional racing cyclist. She rides for the No Radunion Vitalogic team.

== See also ==
- List of 2015 UCI Women's Teams and riders
