= Coral Casado Ortiz =

Spanish cyclist

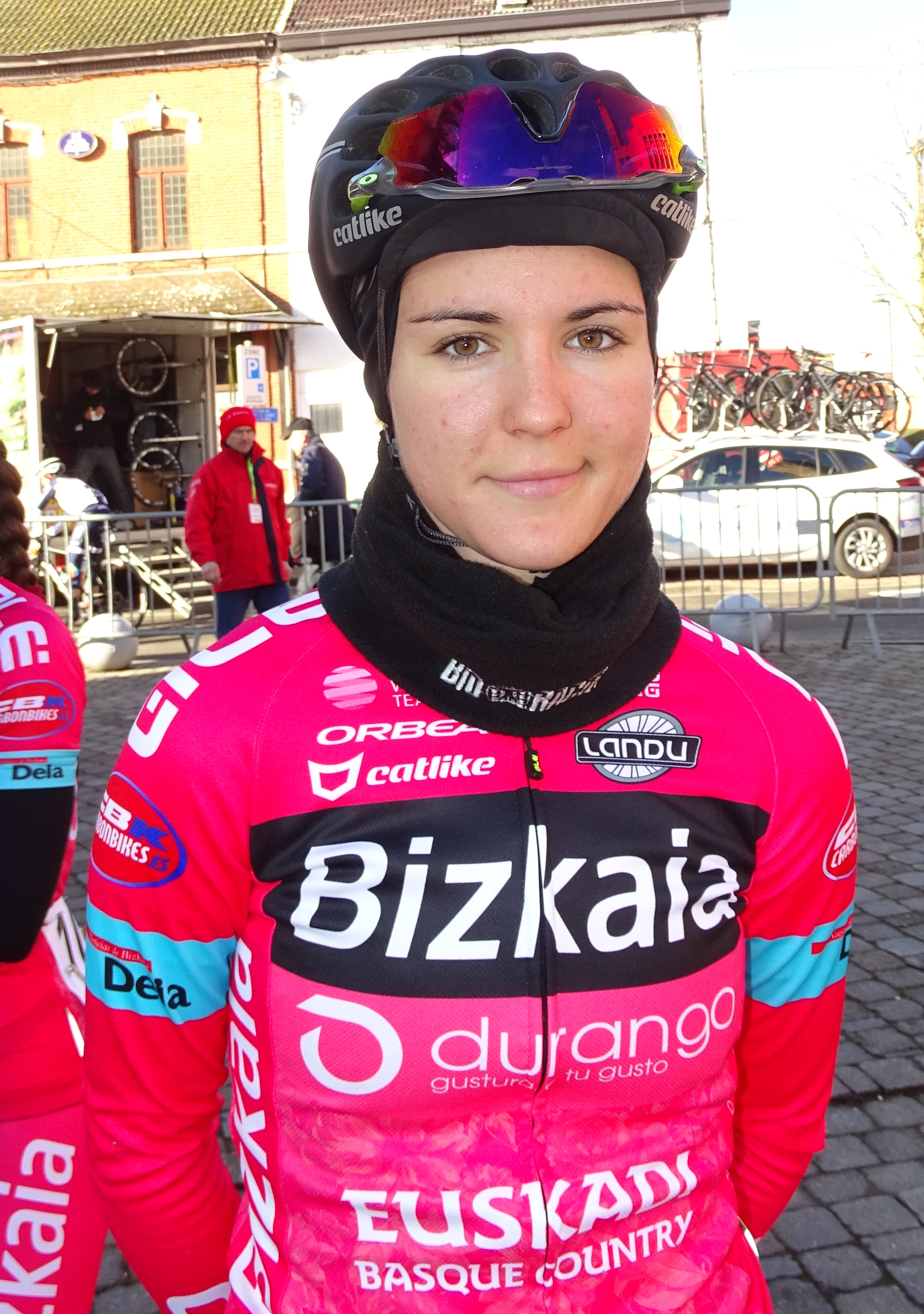

Personal information
- Born: 27 March 1996 (age 30)

Cycling career
- Sport: Cycling
- Role: Rider

Coral Casado Ortiz (born 27 March 1996) is a Spanish professional racing cyclist. She rode for team Bizkaia–Durango in 2015-2016.

== See also ==
- List of 2015 UCI Women's Teams and riders
