= Elisabeth Riegler =

Austrian cyclist

Personal information
- Born: 19 February 1995 (age 31)

Cycling career
- Sport: Cycling
- Role: Rider

Elisabeth Riegler (born 19 February 1995) is an Austrian professional racing cyclist. She rides for the No Radunion Vitalogic team.

== See also ==
- List of 2015 UCI Women's Teams and riders
