= Astrid Gassner =

Austrian cyclist

Personal information
- Born: 30 October 1995 (age 30)

Cycling career
- Sport: Cycling
- Role: Rider

Astrid Gassner (born 30 October 1995) is an Austrian professional racing cyclist. She rides for the No Radunion Vitalogic team.

== See also ==
- List of 2015 UCI Women's Teams and riders
- List of 2016 UCI Women's Teams and riders
