= Steffy Van Den Haute =

Belgian cyclist

Personal information
- Born: 29 November 1993 (age 32)

Cycling career
- Sport: Cycling
- Discipline: Road
- Role: Rider

Amateur team
- 2017–2018: Autoglas Wetteren CT

Professional team
- 2015–2016: Topsport Vlaanderen–Pro-Duo

Steffy Van Den Haute (born 29 November 1993) is a Belgian racing cyclist. In 2015, Van Den Haute finished fourth in Dwars door Vlaanderen.

== See also ==
- List of 2015 UCI Women's Teams and riders
