= Lierni Lekuona Etxebeste =

Spanish cyclist

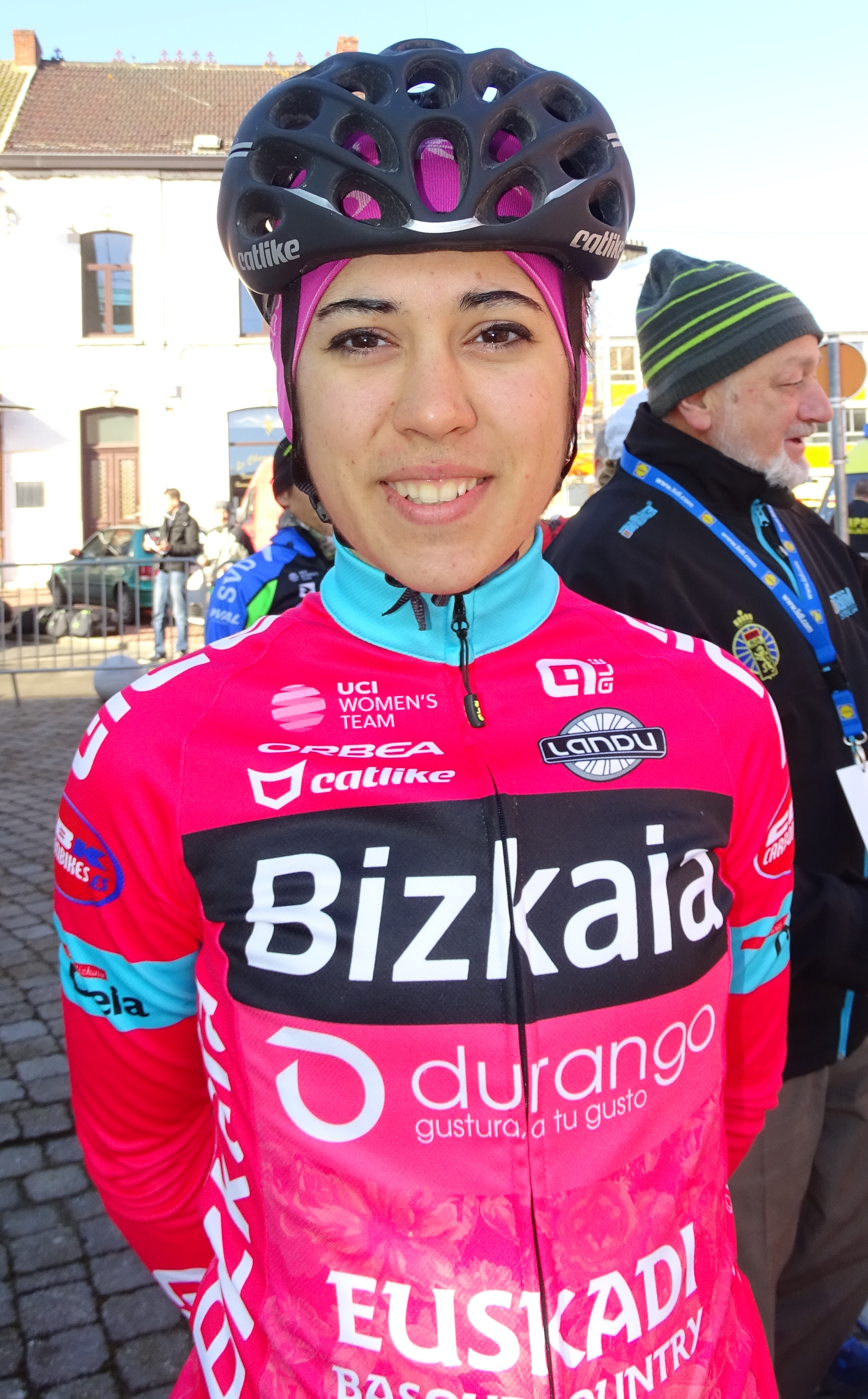
- Lekuona in 2016.

Personal information
- Full name: Lierni Lekuona Etxebeste
- Born: 8 April 1995 (age 31) Lezo, Gipuzkoa, Spain

Cycling career
- Sport: Cycling
- Current team: Lezokuak
- Disciplines: Mountain biking; Cyclo-cross; Road (former)
- Role: Rider

Amateur teams
- 2013: Tolosa Club de Fútbol
- 2018–: Lezokuak

Professional team
- 2014–2018: Bizkaia–Durango

Lierni Lekuona Etxebeste (born 8 April 1995) is a Spanish racing cyclist, who currently rides for Spanish amateur team Lezokuak.

== Major results ==
2013
3rd Road race, National Junior Road Championships

== See also ==
- List of 2015 UCI Women's Teams and riders
