= Amalie Dideriksen =

Danish cyclist (born 1996)

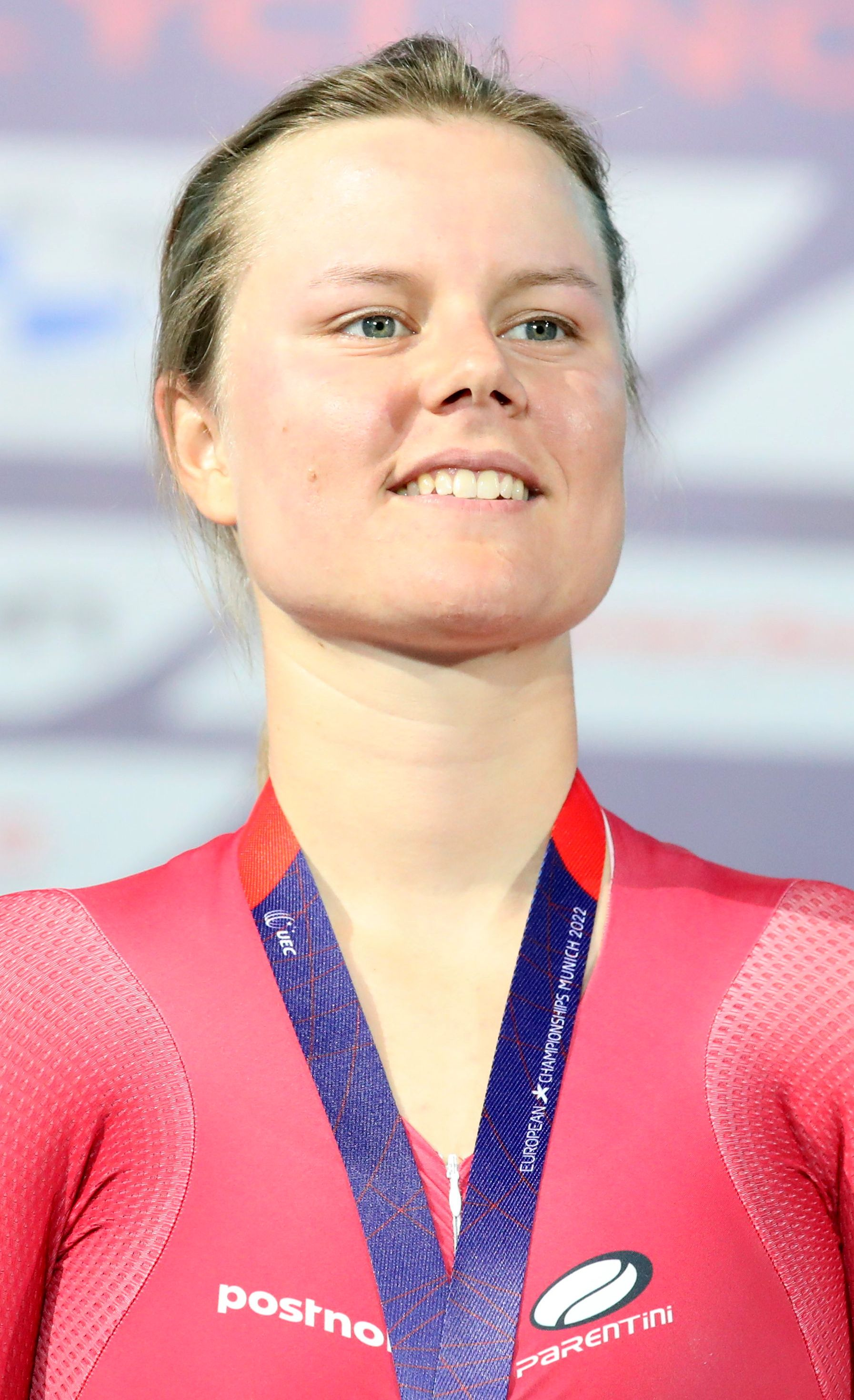
- Dideriksen in 2022

Personal information
- Born: 24 May 1996 (age 30) Kastrup, Denmark
- Height: 1.75 m (5 ft 9 in)
- Weight: 62 kg (137 lb)

Cycling career
- Sport: Cycling
- Current team: Cofidis
- Disciplines: Road; Track
- Role: Rider
- Rider type: Sprinter

Professional teams
- 2015–2020: Boels–Dolmans
- 2021–2022: Trek–Segafredo
- 2023–2024: Uno-X Pro Cycling Team
- 2025–: Cofidis

Major wins
- Road One-day races and Classics World Road Race Championships (2016) National Road Race Championships (2014, 2015, 2018, 2019, 2021) National Time Trial Championships (2020) Ronde van Drenthe (2017) Track World Championships Madison (2024)
Medal record
Representing Denmark
Women's road bicycle racing
World Championships
Gold medal – first place	2016 Doha	Road race
Gold medal – first place	2013 Florence	Junior road race
Gold medal – first place	2014 Ponferrada	Junior road race
Bronze medal – third place	2017 Bergen	Road race
Women's track cycling
Olympic Games
Silver medal – second place	2020 Tokyo	Madison
World Championships
Gold medal – first place	2024 Ballerup	Madison
Silver medal – second place	2018 Apeldoorn	Omnium
Silver medal – second place	2023 Glasgow	Omnium
Silver medal – second place	2025 Santiago	Scratch
Silver medal – second place	2026 Shanghai	Points race
Bronze medal – third place	2018 Apeldoorn	Scratch
Bronze medal – third place	2019 Pruszków	Madison
Bronze medal – third place	2022 Saint-Quentin-en-Yvelines	Madison
Bronze medal – third place	2025 Santiago	Omnium
Bronze medal – third place	2026 Shanghai	Omnium
European Championships
Gold medal – first place	2018 Glasgow	Madison
Gold medal – first place	2019 Apeldoorn	Madison
Silver medal – second place	2015 Grenchen	Omnium
Silver medal – second place	2021 Grenchen	Madison
Bronze medal – third place	2022 Munich	Madison
Bronze medal – third place	2025 Heusden-Zolder	Omnium

Amalie Dideriksen (born 24 May 1996) is a Danish road and track cyclist, who rides for UCI Women's ProTeam Cofidis.

== Career ==
She won the junior women's road race at the World Championships in 2013 and 2014 as well as a bronze medal in the scratch race at the 2013 UCI Juniors Track World Championships. In both 2014 and 2015, she won the Danish national road race championship and in 2015, she also won silver in the women's omnium at the European Track Championships. Dideriksen participated in the women's omnium at the 2016 Summer Olympics. Ranking 9th after the flying lap, she surprised everyone by winning the points race thus elevating her to an overall 5th place.

On 15 October 2016, Dideriksen won the World Championship road race in Doha, Qatar, beating Kirsten Wild and Lotta Lepistö in a bunch sprint. By doing this, she joined select group riders consisting of Marianne Vos, Pauline Ferrand-Prévot, Nicole Cooke and Dideriksen's own national coach, Catherine Marsal, who are all former junior world champions who have since become elite world champions.

In October 2020, Dideriksen signed a two-year contract with the Trek–Segafredo team, from the 2021 season.

At the 2020 Summer Olympics, Dideriksen again represented Denmark in the omnium discipline, finishing 4th. She also participated in the Madison with Julie Leth finishing second, bringing home an Olympic silver medal.

In August 2022, Dideriksen signed a two-year contract with the Uno-X Pro Cycling Team from the 2023 season.

== Major results ==
=== Road ===
2011
National Novice Championships

1st Road race
1st Time trial

2012
1st Mountains classification, Rás na mBan
2013
1st Road race, UCI World Junior Championships
1st Time trial, National Junior Championships
10th Time trial, UEC European Junior Championships
2014
1st Road race, UCI World Junior Championships
1st Road race, National Championships
3rd Time trial, National Junior Championships
2015
National Championships

1st Road race
3rd Time trial

1st Young rider classification, Tour of Norway
2nd Overall Belgium Tour

1st Sprints classification
1st Young rider classification
1st Stage 3

9th Acht van Westerveld
2016
1st Road race, UCI World Championships
Holland Ladies Tour

1st Stages 1 & 2 (TTT)

1st Stage 1 (TTT) Energiewacht Tour
2nd Road race, National Championships
2017
1st Ronde van Drenthe
1st Crescent Vårgårda TTT
1st Stage 1 (TTT) Giro d'Italia Femminile
3rd Road race, UCI World Championships
3rd Acht van Westerveld
5th Road race, UEC European Championships
7th Prudential RideLondon Classique
9th Overall Healthy Ageing Tour

1st Stage 2 (TTT)

9th Omloop van het Hageland
9th Pajot Hills Classic
2018
1st Road race, National Championships
1st Vårgårda WestSweden TTT
Holland Ladies Tour

1st Stages 3 & 4

1st Stage 3b (TTT) Healthy Ageing Tour
1st Stage 4 The Women's Tour
2nd Team time trial, UCI World Championships
10th Dwars door Vlaanderen
10th RideLondon Classique
2019
1st Road race, National Championships
4th Vårgårda WestSweden TTT
6th Ronde van Drenthe
2020
1st Time trial, National Championships
2021
1st Road race, National Championships
9th Scheldeprijs
2022
1st Vårgårda WestSweden TTT
1st Stage 1 (TTT) Challenge by La Vuelta
3rd Road race, National Championships
2023
1st Grand Prix Eco-Struct
2nd Trofee Maarten Wynants
4th Road race, National Championships
6th Classic Brugge–De Panne
2024
2nd Road race, National Championships
6th GP Eco-Struct
7th Trofee Maarten Wynants
2025
1st Stage 1 Volta a Portugal Feminina

1st Points classification

2nd Road race, National Championships
8th Copenhagen Sprint
2026
8th Copenhagen Sprint

=== Track ===
2010
National Championships

1st Omnium
1st Points race
1st Scratch

3rd Individual pursuit, National Junior Championships
2013
3rd Scratch, UCI World Junior Championships
2014
1st Scratch, UCI World Junior Championships
2015
UEC European Under-23 Championships

1st Individual pursuit
1st Omnium

1st Omnium, UIV Talents Cup Final
2nd Omnium, UEC European Championships
Irish International GP

2nd Omnium
2nd Scratch

3rd Scratch, UCI World Cup, Cambridge
6 Giorni Delle Rose – Fiorenzuola

3rd Omnium
3rd Scratch

3rd Omnium, Grand Prix of Poland
2016
National Championships

1st Omnium
1st Points race
1st Individual pursuit
1st Scratch
1st Sprint

Revolution, Manchester

1st Points race
2nd Scratch

3rd Scratch, Revolution Champions League, Manchester
2017
1st Omnium, National Championships
Prilba Moravy

1st Omnium
1st Scratch

1st Omnium, Grand Prix Favorit Brno
UEC European Under-23 Championships

2nd Points race
3rd Omnium
3rd Scratch

Revolution Champions League, London

2nd Points race
2nd Scratch

UCI World Cup

3rd Omnium, Pruszków
3rd Omnium, Manchester

2018
1st Madison, UEC European Championships (with Julie Leth)
UCI World Cup

1st Madison, Saint-Quentin-en-Yvelines (with Julie Leth)
2nd Madison, Milton (with Julie Leth)
2nd Madison, Berlin (with Julie Leth)

UCI World Championships

2nd Omnium
3rd Scratch

2019
1st Madison, UEC European Championships (with Julie Leth)
3rd Madison, UCI World Championships (with Julie Leth)
2020
1st Madison, National Championships (with Trine Schmidt)
2021
National Championships

1st Madison (with Karoline Hemmsen)
1st Omnium
1st Points race

2nd Madison, Olympic Games (with Julie Leth)
2nd Madison, UEC European Championships (with Julie Leth)
2022
3rd Madison, UEC European Championships (with Julie Leth)
3rd Madison, UCI Nations Cup, Glasgow (with Julie Leth)
2024
1st Madison, UCI World Championships (with Julie Leth)
2025
UCI World Championships

2nd Scratch
3rd Omnium

== See also ==
- 2015 Boels Dolmans Cycling Team season
