= Ellinor Huusko =

Swedish cyclist

Personal information
- Born: 17 December 1996 (age 29)

Cycling career
- Sport: Cycling
- Role: Rider

Ellinor Huusko (born 17 December 1996) is a Swedish professional racing cyclist. She rides for Team Rytger.

== See also ==
- List of 2015 UCI Women's Teams and riders
