= List of 2021 UCI Women's Teams and riders =

List of cyclists

The following is a list of 2021 UCI Women's Teams and riders for the 2021 women's road cycling season.

== World Teams ==
=== Alé BTC Ljubljana ===
As of 10 January 2021.

Rider	Date of birth
Marta Bastianelli (ITA)	30 April 1987 (age 39)
Maaike Boogaard (NED)	24 August 1998 (age 27)
Eugenia Bujak (SLO)	25 June 1989 (age 37)
Anastasia Chursina (RUS)	7 April 1995 (age 31)
Margarita Victoria García (ESP)	2 January 1984 (age 42)
Tatiana Guderzo (ITA)	22 August 1984 (age 41)

Rider	Date of birth
Alessia Patuelli (ITA)	22 December 2002 (age 23)
Urša Pintar (SLO)	3 October 1985 (age 40)
Marlen Reusser (SUI)	20 September 1991 (age 34)
Laura Tomasi (ITA)	1 July 1999 (age 27)
Anna Trevisi (ITA)	8 May 1992 (age 34)
Sophie Wright (GBR)	15 March 1999 (age 27)

=== Canyon–SRAM ===
As of 10 January 2021.

Rider	Date of birth
Alena Amialiusik (BLR)	6 February 1989 (age 37)
Alice Barnes (GBR)	17 July 1995 (age 30)
Hannah Barnes (GBR)	4 May 1993 (age 33)
Neve Bradbury (AUS)	11 April 2002 (age 24)
Elise Chabbey (SUI)	24 April 1993 (age 33)
Tiffany Cromwell (AUS)	6 July 1988 (age 38)
Chloé Dygert (USA)	1 January 1997 (age 29)

Rider	Date of birth
Ella Harris (NZL)	18 July 1998 (age 27)
Mikayla Harvey (NZL)	7 September 1998 (age 27)
Lisa Klein (GER)	15 July 1996 (age 29)
Hannah Ludwig (GER)	15 February 2000 (age 26)
Katarzyna Niewiadoma (POL)	29 September 1994 (age 31)
Alexis Ryan (USA)	18 August 1994 (age 31)
Omer Shapira (ISR)	9 September 1994 (age 31)

=== FDJ Nouvelle-Aquitaine Futuroscope ===
As of 11 January 2021.

Rider	Date of birth
Stine Borgli (NOR)	4 July 1990 (age 36)
Marta Cavalli (ITA)	18 March 1998 (age 28)
Brodie Chapman (AUS)	9 April 1991 (age 35)
Clara Copponi (FRA)	12 January 1999 (age 27)
Eugénie Duval (FRA)	3 May 1993 (age 33)
Emilia Fahlin (SWE)	24 October 1988 (age 37)
Maëlle Grossetête (FRA)	10 April 1998 (age 28)

Rider	Date of birth
Victorie Guilman (FRA)	25 March 1996 (age 30)
Lauren Kitchen (AUS)	21 November 1990 (age 35)
Marie Le Net (FRA)	25 January 2000 (age 26)
Évita Muzic (FRA)	26 May 1999 (age 27)
Cecilie Uttrup Ludwig (DNK)	23 August 1995 (age 30)
Jade Wiel (FRA)	2 April 2000 (age 26)

=== Liv Racing ===
As of 11 January 2021.

Rider	Date of birth
Sofia Bertizzolo (ITA)	21 August 1997 (age 28)
Valerie Demey (BEL)	17 January 1994 (age 32)
Alison Jackson (CAN)	14 December 1988 (age 37)
Marta Jaskulska (POL)	25 March 2000 (age 26)
Lotte Kopecky (BEL)	10 November 1995 (age 30)

Rider	Date of birth
Jeanne Korevaar (NED)	24 September 1996 (age 29)
Evy Kuijpers (NED)	15 February 1995 (age 31)
Soraya Paladin (ITA)	4 May 1993 (age 33)
Pauliena Rooijakkers (NED)	12 May 1993 (age 33)
Sabrina Stultiens (NED)	8 July 1993 (age 33)

=== Movistar Team ===
As of 12 January 2021.

Rider	Date of birth
Katrine Aalerud (NOR)	4 December 1994 (age 31)
Aude Biannic (FRA)	27 March 1991 (age 35)
Jelena Erić (SRB)	15 January 1996 (age 30)
Alicia González Blanco (ESP)	27 May 1995 (age 31)
Barbara Guarischi (ITA)	2 October 1990 (age 35)
Sheyla Gutiérrez (ESP)	1 January 1994 (age 32)
Sara Martín (ESP)	22 March 1999 (age 27)

Rider	Date of birth
Emma Norsgaard Jørgensen (DNK)	26 July 1999 (age 26)
Lourdes Oyarbide (ESP)	8 April 1994 (age 32)
Paula Patiño (COL)	29 March 1997 (age 29)
Gloria Rodríguez (ESP)	6 March 1992 (age 34)
Alba Teruel Ribes (ESP)	17 August 1996 (age 29)
Leah Thomas (USA)	30 May 1989 (age 37)
Annemiek van Vleuten (NED)	8 October 1982 (age 43)

=== SD Worx ===
As of 13 January 2021.

Rider	Date of birth
Karol-Ann Canuel (CAN)	18 April 1988 (age 38)
Elena Cecchini (ITA)	25 May 1992 (age 34)
Jolien D'Hoore (BEL)	14 March 1990 (age 36)
Niamh Fisher-Black (NZL)	12 August 2000 (age 25)
Roxane Fournier (FRA)	7 November 1991 (age 34)
Christine Majerus (LUX)	25 February 1987 (age 39)
Ashleigh Moolman (RSA)	9 December 1985 (age 40)

Rider	Date of birth
Nikola Nosková (CZE)	1 July 1997 (age 29)
Amy Pieters (NED)	1 June 1991 (age 35)
Anna Shackley (GBR)	17 May 2001 (age 25)
Lonneke Uneken (NED)	2 March 2000 (age 26)
Chantal van den Broek-Blaak (NED)	22 October 1989 (age 36)
Anna van der Breggen (NED)	18 April 1990 (age 36)
Demi Vollering (NED)	15 November 1996 (age 29)

=== Team BikeExchange ===
As of 13 January 2021.

Rider	Date of birth
Jessica Allen (AUS)	17 April 1993 (age 33)
Grace Brown (AUS)	7 July 1992 (age 34)
Teniel Campbell (TTO)	23 September 1997 (age 28)
Janneke Ensing (NED)	21 September 1986 (age 39)
Arianna Fidanza (ITA)	6 January 1995 (age 31)
Lucy Kennedy (AUS)	11 July 1988 (age 37)
Jessica Roberts (GBR)	11 April 1999 (age 27)

Rider	Date of birth
Sarah Roy (AUS)	27 February 1986 (age 40)
Ane Santesteban (ESP)	12 December 1990 (age 35)
Amanda Spratt (AUS)	17 September 1987 (age 38)
Moniek Tenniglo (NED)	2 May 1988 (age 38)
Georgia Williams (NZL)	25 August 1993 (age 32)
Urška Žigart (SLO)	4 December 1996 (age 29)

=== Team DSM ===
As of 14 January 2021.

Rider	Date of birth
Susanne Andersen (NOR)	23 July 1998 (age 27)
Pfeiffer Georgi (GBR)	27 September 2000 (age 25)
Megan Jastrab (USA)	29 January 2002 (age 24)
Leah Kirchmann (CAN)	30 June 1990 (age 36)
Franziska Koch (GER)	13 July 2000 (age 25)
Juliette Labous (FRA)	4 November 1998 (age 27)
Liane Lippert (GER)	13 January 1998 (age 28)

Rider	Date of birth
Floortje Mackaij (NED)	18 October 1995 (age 30)
Wilma Olausson (SWE)	9 April 2001 (age 25)
Esmée Peperkamp (NED)	23 July 1997 (age 28)
Coryn Rivera (USA)	26 August 1992 (age 33)
Julia Soek (NED)	12 December 1990 (age 35)
Lorena Wiebes (NED)	17 March 1999 (age 27)

=== Trek–Segafredo ===
As of 15 January 2021.

Rider	Date of birth
Elynor Bäckstedt (GBR)	6 December 2001 (age 24)
Lucinda Brand (NED)	2 July 1989 (age 37)
Audrey Cordon-Ragot (FRA)	22 September 1989 (age 36)
Lizzie Deignan (GBR)	18 December 1988 (age 37)
Amalie Dideriksen (DNK)	24 May 1996 (age 30)
Lauretta Hanson (AUS)	29 October 1994 (age 31)
Chloe Hosking (AUS)	1 October 1990 (age 35)

Rider	Date of birth
Elisa Longo Borghini (ITA)	10 December 1991 (age 34)
Letizia Paternoster (ITA)	22 July 1999 (age 26)
Shirin van Anrooij (NED)	5 February 2002 (age 24)
Ellen van Dijk (NED)	11 February 1987 (age 39)
Tayler Wiles (USA)	20 July 1989 (age 36)
Ruth Winder (USA)	9 July 1993 (age 33)
Trixi Worrack (GER)	28 September 1981 (age 44)

== Continental Teams ==
=== A.R. Monex Women's Pro Cycling Team ===
As of 16 January 2021.

Rider	Date of birth
Maria Pia Chiatto (ITA)	13 May 2002 (age 24)
Emma Faoro (ITA)	21 March 2002 (age 24)
Ariadna Gutiérrez (MEX)	22 August 1991 (age 34)
Eider Merino Cortazar (ESP)	2 August 1994 (age 31)
Mariia Miliaeva (RUS)	16 July 2001 (age 24)
Maria Novolodskaya (RUS)	28 July 1999 (age 26)
Katia Ragusa (ITA)	19 May 1997 (age 29)

Rider	Date of birth
Andrea Ramírez (MEX)	25 September 1999 (age 26)
Lizbeth Salazar (MEX)	8 December 1996 (age 29)
Arlenis Sierra (CUB)	7 December 1992 (age 33)
Maria Vittoria Sperotto (ITA)	20 November 1996 (age 29)
Jade Teolis (FRA)	12 January 2002 (age 24)
María José Vargas (CRC)	15 February 1996 (age 30)

=== Arkéa Pro Cycling Team ===
As of 17 January 2021.

Rider	Date of birth
Pauline Allin (FRA)	2 May 1995 (age 31)
Charlotte Becker (GER)	19 May 1983 (age 43)
Léa Curinier (FRA)	21 April 2001 (age 25)
Amandine Fouquenet (FRA)	19 February 2001 (age 25)
Lucie Jounier (FRA)	16 July 1998 (age 27)
Cédrine Kerbaol (FRA)	15 May 2001 (age 25)

Rider	Date of birth
Typhaine Laurance (FRA)	28 August 1998 (age 27)
Marie-Morgane Le Deunff (FRA)	14 May 2002 (age 24)
Sandra Levenez (FRA)	5 July 1979 (age 47)
Greta Richioud (FRA)	11 October 1996 (age 29)
Gladys Verhulst (FRA)	2 January 1997 (age 29)

=== Andy Schleck–CP NVST–Immo Losch ===
As of 17 January 2021.

Rider	Date of birth
Michelle Andres (SUI)	26 May 1997 (age 29)
Maïté Barthels (LUX)	23 November 2001 (age 24)
Mia Berg (LUX)	4 August 1997 (age 28)
Nina Berton (LUX)	3 August 2001 (age 24)
Fabienne Buri (SUI)	17 March 1999 (age 27)
Georgia Danford (NZL)	3 April 1999 (age 27)
Désirée Ehrler (SUI)	20 August 1991 (age 34)
Claire Faber (LUX)	21 June 1998 (age 28)
Line Marie Gulliksen (NOR)	4 July 1990 (age 36)
Mae Lang (EST)	4 February 1996 (age 30)

Rider	Date of birth
Annika Luthje (LUX)	7 July 1989 (age 37)
Rylee McMullen (NZL)	19 July 1995 (age 30)
Léna Mettraux (SUI)	8 September 1998 (age 27)
Lisa Müllenberg (NED)	21 August 1996 (age 29)
Lauren Murphy (GBR)	26 March 1999 (age 27)
Mie Bjørndal Ottestad (NOR)	17 July 1997 (age 28)
Carolin Schiff (GER)	3 January 1986 (age 40)
Zsófia Szabó (HUN)	3 January 1997 (age 29)
Sandra Weiss (SUI)	27 February 1991 (age 35)

=== Aromitalia–Basso Bikes–Vaiano ===
As of 17 January 2021.

Rider	Date of birth
Olivija Baleišytė (LTU)	3 September 1998 (age 27)
Giada Borghesi (ITA)	27 November 2002 (age 23)
Letizia Borghesi (ITA)	16 October 1998 (age 27)
Inga Češulienė (LTU)	14 February 1986 (age 40)
Sofia Collinelli (ITA)	24 August 2001 (age 24)

Rider	Date of birth
Rasa Leleivytė (LTU)	22 July 1988 (age 37)
Giulia Marchesini (ITA)	14 May 1998 (age 28)
Cristina Martínez (ESP)	2 January 1996 (age 30)
Valentina Scandolara (ITA)	1 May 1990 (age 36)
Gemma Sernissi (ITA)	6 March 2000 (age 26)

=== Bepink ===
As of 20 January 2021.

Rider	Date of birth
Camilla Alessio (ITA)	23 July 2001 (age 24)
Vania Canvelli (ITA)	21 October 1997 (age 28)
Giorgia Catarzi (ITA)	15 June 2001 (age 25)
Lara Crestanello (ITA)	21 March 2002 (age 24)
Michaela Drummond (NZL)	5 April 1998 (age 28)
Simona Frapporti (ITA)	14 July 1988 (age 37)
Markéta Hájková (CZE)	14 March 2000 (age 26)

Rider	Date of birth
Nora Jenčušová (SVK)	14 April 2002 (age 24)
Chiara Perini (ITA)	9 December 1997 (age 28)
Nadia Quagliotto (ITA)	22 March 1997 (age 29)
Prisca Savi (ITA)	21 March 2002 (age 24)
Silvia Valsecchi (ITA)	19 July 1982 (age 43)
Matilde Vitillo (ITA)	8 March 2001 (age 25)
Silvia Zanardi (ITA)	3 March 2000 (age 26)

=== Bingoal Casino–Chevalmeire ===
As of 18 January 2021.

Rider	Date of birth
Nathalie Bex (BEL)	12 April 1998 (age 28)
Caren Commissaris (BEL)	22 April 1994 (age 32)
Demi de Jong (NED)	11 February 1995 (age 31)
Thalita de Jong (NED)	6 November 1993 (age 32)
Demmy Druyts (BEL)	4 October 1995 (age 30)
Kelly Druyts (BEL)	21 October 1989 (age 36)
Lenny Druyts (BEL)	18 May 1997 (age 29)

Rider	Date of birth
Justine Ghekiere (BEL)	14 May 1996 (age 30)
Claudia Jongerius (NED)	2 December 1998 (age 27)
Puck Moonen (NED)	20 March 1996 (age 30)
Rossella Ratto (ITA)	20 October 1993 (age 32)
Rozanne Slik (NED)	12 April 1991 (age 35)
Kelly Van den Steen (BEL)	1 September 1995 (age 30)
Natalie van Gogh (NED)	14 September 1974 (age 51)

=== Bizkaia–Durango ===
As of 18 January 2021.

Rider	Date of birth
Sandra Alonso (ESP)	19 August 1998 (age 27)
Yurani Blanco (ESP)	3 February 1998 (age 28)
Daniela Campos (POR)	31 March 2002 (age 24)
Émilie Fortin (CAN)	21 May 1999 (age 27)
Marina Garau (ESP)	15 September 2002 (age 23)
Ariana Gilabert (ESP)	12 April 2000 (age 26)
Nadine Gill (DEU)	19 April 1991 (age 35)
Lucía González Blanco (ESP)	9 July 1990 (age 36)

Rider	Date of birth
June Herrera (ESP)	18 November 2002 (age 23)
Lizzie Holden (GBR)	12 September 1997 (age 28)
Lydia Iglesias (ESP)	14 April 1997 (age 29)
Amaia Lartitegi (ESP)	12 March 2001 (age 25)
Irene Loizate (ESP)	17 May 1995 (age 31)
Irati Puigdefábregas (ESP)	24 September 2001 (age 24)
Julia Sánchez (ESP)	5 April 2002 (age 24)

=== Born to win G20 Ambedo ===
As of 28 February 2021.

Rider	Date of birth
Francesca Balducci (ITA)	1 May 1996 (age 30)
Angelica Brogi (ITA)	20 October 1998 (age 27)
Anastasia Carbonari (ITA)	11 September 1999 (age 26)
Caris Cosentino (ITA)	18 September 1999 (age 26)
Elena Franchi (ITA)	26 August 1996 (age 29)

Rider	Date of birth
Leonora Geppi (ITA)	9 December 1999 (age 26)
Alice Palazzi (ITA)	25 January 2002 (age 24)
Martina Sgrisleri (ITA)	14 November 2001 (age 24)
Giorgia Simoni (ITA)	24 March 2002 (age 24)

=== Burgos Alimenta Women Cycling Sport ===
As of 1 February 2021.

Rider	Date of birth
Antri Christoforou (CYP)	2 April 1992 (age 34)
Sara Cueto (ESP)	16 February 1994 (age 32)
Ainara Elbusto (ESP)	10 September 1992 (age 33)
Nicole Hanselmann (SUI)	6 May 1991 (age 35)
Małgorzata Jasińska (POL)	18 January 1984 (age 42)
Nofar Maoz (ISR)	27 October 2001 (age 24)

Rider	Date of birth
Tereza Neumanová (CZE)	9 August 1998 (age 27)
Rachel Neylan (AUS)	9 March 1982 (age 44)
Luciana Roland (ARG)	8 January 1995 (age 31)
Ana Ruíz (ESP)	9 August 1990 (age 35)
Josie Talbot (AUS)	9 August 1996 (age 29)
Alessia Vigilia (ITA)	1 September 1999 (age 26)

=== CAMS–Tifosi ===
As of 19 January 2021.

Rider	Date of birth
Megan Barker (GBR)	15 August 1997 (age 28)
Rebecca Durrell (GBR)	25 August 1988 (age 37)
Emma Edwards (USA)	24 August 1990 (age 35)
Jessica Finney (GBR)	7 December 1995 (age 30)
Illi Gardner (GBR)	14 October 1999 (age 26)
Natalie Grinczer (GBR)	15 November 1993 (age 32)
Clover Murray (GBR)	6 October 1997 (age 28)

Rider	Date of birth
Jennifer Powell (GBR)	29 September 1987 (age 38)
Katie Scott (GBR)	20 April 2001 (age 25)
Gabriella Shaw (GBR)	22 June 1992 (age 34)
Hayley Simmonds (GBR)	22 July 1988 (age 37)
Jo Tindley (GBR)	1 May 1987 (age 39)
Kate Wootton (GBR)	6 October 2001 (age 24)

=== Ceratizit–WNT Pro Cycling ===
As of 19 January 2021.

Rider	Date of birth
Laura Asencio (FRA)	14 May 1998 (age 28)
Lizzy Banks (GBR)	7 November 1990 (age 35)
Franziska Brauße (GER)	20 November 1998 (age 27)
Lisa Brennauer (GER)	8 June 1988 (age 38)
Maria Giulia Confalonieri (ITA)	30 March 1993 (age 33)
Kathrin Hammes (GER)	9 January 1989 (age 37)
Lotta Henttala (FIN)	28 June 1989 (age 37)

Rider	Date of birth
Marta Lach (POL)	26 May 1997 (age 29)
Julie Leth (DEN)	13 July 1992 (age 33)
Erica Magnaldi (ITA)	24 August 1992 (age 33)
Sarah Rijkes (AUT)	2 April 1991 (age 35)
Lea Lin Teutenberg (GER)	2 July 1999 (age 27)
Lara Vieceli (ITA)	16 July 1993 (age 32)
Kirsten Wild (NED)	15 October 1982 (age 43)

=== China Liv Pro Cycling ===
As of 20 January 2021.

Rider	Date of birth
Cao Yuan (CHN)	2 February 1997 (age 29)
Leung Bo Yee (HKG)	21 November 1993 (age 32)
Leung Hoi Wah (HKG)	23 September 1998 (age 27)
Leung Wing Yee (HKG)	29 October 1996 (age 29)
Liu Jiali (CHN)	6 April 1994 (age 32)

Rider	Date of birth
Lu Siying (CHN)	4 November 1996 (age 29)
Ng Sze Wing (HKG)	21 June 2000 (age 26)
Pang Yao (HKG)	27 May 1995 (age 31)
Yang Qianyu (HKG)	7 March 1993 (age 33)
Zhao Xisha (CHN)	28 September 1992 (age 33)

=== Cogeas–Mettler–Look ===
As of 30 January 2021.

Rider	Date of birth
Victoire Barbe (FRA)	26 April 1999 (age 27)
Hannah Buch (GER)	11 September 2002 (age 23)
Tamara Dronova (RUS)	13 August 1993 (age 32)
Kseniia Duiunova (RUS)	8 January 1997 (age 29)
Iuliia Galimullina (RUS)	20 September 2001 (age 24)
Aigul Gareeva (RUS)	22 August 2001 (age 24)

Rider	Date of birth
Gulnaz Khatuntseva (RUS)	21 April 1994 (age 32)
Diana Klimova (RUS)	8 October 1996 (age 29)
Thalea Mäder (GER)	28 January 2002 (age 24)
Amber Neben (USA)	18 February 1975 (age 51)
Sari Saarelainen (FIN)	1 March 1981 (age 45)
Marina Uvarova (RUS)	9 November 2000 (age 25)

=== DNA Pro Cycling ===
As of 27 January 2021.

Rider	Date of birth
Erica Clevenger (USA)	1 May 1994 (age 32)
Margot Clyne (USA)	27 February 1995 (age 31)
Maggie Coles-Lyster (CAN)	12 February 1999 (age 27)
Heather Fischer (USA)	28 November 1988 (age 37)
Sarah Kaufmann (USA)	16 May 1981 (age 45)
Mia Kilburg (USA)	27 October 1989 (age 36)

Rider	Date of birth
Kimberly Lucie (USA)	21 April 1986 (age 40)
Hanna Muegge (GER)	28 May 1989 (age 37)
Liza Rachetto (USA)	30 January 1974 (age 52)
Nicole Shields (NZL)	9 September 1999 (age 26)
Brenna Wrye-Simpson (USA)	14 November 1987 (age 38)

=== Doltcini–Van Eyck–Proximus ===
As of 5 February 2021.

Rider	Date of birth
Amber Aernouts (BEL)	25 October 2000 (age 25)
Minke Bakker (NED)	11 March 1997 (age 29)
Victoire Berteau (FRA)	16 August 2000 (age 25)
Mieke Docx (BEL)	8 June 1996 (age 30)
Olha Kulynych (UKR)	1 February 2000 (age 26)
Jade Lenaers (BEL)	30 November 2001 (age 24)
Kelly Markus (NED)	7 February 1993 (age 33)
Jenna Merrick (NZL)	25 February 2000 (age 26)
Lotte Popelier (BEL)	21 May 2001 (age 25)

Rider	Date of birth
Dina Scavone (BEL)	10 August 2001 (age 24)
Christina Schweinberger (AUT)	29 October 1996 (age 29)
Kathrin Schweinberger (AUT)	29 October 1996 (age 29)
Nicole Steigenga (NED)	27 January 1998 (age 28)
Fien van Eynde (BEL)	8 September 1998 (age 27)
Bryony van Velzen (NED)	14 May 1996 (age 30)
Marieke van Witzenburg-de Groot (NED)	29 October 1985 (age 40)
Kata Blanka Vas (HUN)	3 September 2001 (age 24)

=== Drops–Le Col ===
As of 21 January 2021.

Rider	Date of birth
Lizzy Bennett (GBR)	18 August 1999 (age 26)
Anna Christian (GBR)	6 August 1995 (age 30)
Dani Christmas (GBR)	21 December 1987 (age 38)
Joscelin Lowden (GBR)	3 October 1987 (age 38)
Maria Martins (POR)	9 July 1999 (age 27)
Emily Meakin (GBR)	18 December 1988 (age 37)
Emilie Moberg (NOR)	12 July 1991 (age 34)

Rider	Date of birth
Elise Marie Olsen (NOR)	13 February 2001 (age 25)
Sara Penton (SWE)	15 November 1988 (age 37)
Finja Smekal (GER)	28 February 2001 (age 25)
April Tacey (GBR)	12 October 2000 (age 25)
Alice Towers (GBR)	12 October 2002 (age 23)
Maike van der Duin (NED)	12 September 2001 (age 24)
Marjolein van't Geloof (NED)	27 March 1996 (age 30)

=== Eneicat–RBH Global–Martín Villa ===
As of 21 January 2021.

Rider	Date of birth
Anna Baidak (RUS)	13 November 2000 (age 25)
Kim Baptista (GBR)	27 December 2000 (age 25)
Julia Biryukova (UKR)	24 January 1998 (age 28)
Alessia Bulleri (ITA)	19 July 1993 (age 32)
Nicole D'Agostin (ITA)	1 February 1999 (age 27)
Varvara Fasoi (GRE)	2 February 1991 (age 35)
Ziortza Isasi (ESP)	5 August 1995 (age 30)
Lija Laizāne (LAT)	6 July 1993 (age 33)

Rider	Date of birth
Anastasiia Pliaskina (RUS)	21 February 1996 (age 30)
Zaloa Ramos (ESP)	20 October 1989 (age 36)
Carmen Rodríguez (ESP)	5 July 2000 (age 26)
Núria Tauler (ESP)	25 June 2002 (age 24)
María Paula Tobías (MEX)	25 February 2000 (age 26)
Aidi Gerde Tuisk (EST)	1 March 2002 (age 24)
Silvia Zúñiga (ESP)	10 August 1985 (age 40)

=== GT Krush Tunap ===
As of 22 January 2021.

Rider	Date of birth
Marissa Baks (NED)	5 December 1998 (age 27)
Inez Beijer (NED)	22 November 1995 (age 30)
Henrietta Colborne (GBR)	20 April 1998 (age 28)
Nathalie Eklund (SWE)	28 May 1991 (age 35)
Daniek Hengeveld (NED)	17 November 2002 (age 23)

Rider	Date of birth
Melanie Klement (NED)	3 May 1994 (age 32)
Clara Lundmark (SWE)	4 April 1999 (age 27)
Quinty Ton (NED)	4 August 1998 (age 27)
Melissa van Neck (CZE)	13 October 1991 (age 34)
Nienke Wasmus (NED)	23 October 1999 (age 26)

=== InstaFund Racing ===
As of 23 January 2021.

Rider	Date of birth
Ngaire Barraclough (CAN)	20 July 2002 (age 23)
Caroline Baur (SUI)	17 April 1994 (age 32)
Isabella Bertold (CAN)	4 February 1991 (age 35)
Gillian Ellsay (CAN)	26 March 1997 (age 29)
Rotem Gafinovitz (ISR)	9 June 1992 (age 34)

Rider	Date of birth
Elizabeth Gin (CAN)	2 February 2001 (age 25)
Rachel Langdon (GBR)	25 September 1988 (age 37)
Harriet Owen (GBR)	16 December 1993 (age 32)
Sonia Taylor (CAN)	2 June 1989 (age 37)
Gabby Traxler (CAN)	10 May 1998 (age 28)

=== Isolmant–Premac–Vittoria ===
As of 23 January 2021.

Rider	Date of birth
Francesca Baroni (ITA)	4 November 1999 (age 26)
Noemi Lucrezia Eremita (ITA)	30 August 2002 (age 23)
Martina Fidanza (ITA)	5 November 1999 (age 26)
Giorgia Fraiegari (ITA)	18 July 1995 (age 30)
Alice Gasparini (ITA)	14 December 1997 (age 28)

Rider	Date of birth
Francesca Pisciali (ITA)	19 May 1998 (age 28)
Gaia Realini (ITA)	19 June 2001 (age 25)
Beatrice Rossato (ITA)	6 November 1996 (age 29)
Greta Tebaldi (ITA)	5 January 2002 (age 24)
Emanuela Zanetti (ITA)	13 March 2000 (age 26)

=== Lotto–Soudal Ladies ===
As of 23 January 2021.

Rider	Date of birth
Danique Braam (NED)	5 September 1995 (age 30)
Alana Castrique (BEL)	8 May 1999 (age 27)
Lone Meertens (BEL)	16 April 1998 (age 28)
Hanna Nilsson (SWE)	16 February 1992 (age 34)
Abby-Mae Parkinson (GBR)	30 July 1997 (age 28)

Rider	Date of birth
Anna Plichta (POL)	10 February 1992 (age 34)
Christina Siggaard (DNK)	24 March 1994 (age 32)
Silke Smulders (NED)	1 April 2001 (age 25)
Jesse Vandenbulcke (BEL)	17 January 1996 (age 30)
Elise Vander Sande (BEL)	1 December 1997 (age 28)

=== Lviv Cycling Team ===
As of 24 January 2021.

Rider	Date of birth
Viktoriia Alieksieieva (UKR)	25 October 1996 (age 29)
Viktoriya Bondar (UKR)	25 September 1995 (age 30)
Sarah Borremans (BEL)	4 August 1988 (age 37)
Lauren Creamer (IRL)	20 January 1992 (age 34)
Naomi de Roeck (BEL)	23 October 1990 (age 35)
Sophie Enever (GBR)	22 November 1999 (age 26)
Tetyana Klimchenko (UKR)	8 May 1994 (age 32)
Veronika Kormos (HUN)	17 August 1992 (age 33)
Marga López (ESP)	3 December 1997 (age 28)

Rider	Date of birth
Solomiia Lukachuk (UKR)	30 April 2001 (age 25)
Bronwyn MacGregor (NZL)	12 November 1982 (age 43)
Anna Nahirna (UKR)	30 September 1988 (age 37)
Mirjana Schaap (NED)	25 April 1980 (age 46)
Olena Sharha (UKR)	24 December 1986 (age 39)
Sofiia Shevchenko (UKR)	29 June 2002 (age 24)
Fiona Turnbull (GBR)	27 June 2000 (age 26)
Gloria Van Mechelen (BEL)	24 December 2002 (age 23)
Alice Zovico (ITA)	21 December 1999 (age 26)

=== Massi–Tactic Women Team ===
As of 24 January 2021.

Rider	Date of birth
Olivia Baril (CAN)	10 October 1997 (age 28)
Mireia Benito (ESP)	30 December 1996 (age 29)
Maaike Coljé (NED)	7 March 1997 (age 29)
Agua Marina Espínola (PAR)	31 March 1996 (age 30)
Emma Grant (GBR)	30 September 1991 (age 34)
Vita Heine (NOR)	21 November 1984 (age 41)

Rider	Date of birth
Špela Kern (SLO)	24 September 1990 (age 35)
Belén López (ESP)	18 April 1984 (age 42)
Martina Moreno (ESP)	14 September 2001 (age 24)
Patricia Ortega (ESP)	15 September 1988 (age 37)
Gabrielle Pilote Fortin (CAN)	26 April 1993 (age 33)
Mireia Trias (ESP)	22 March 2000 (age 26)

=== Minsk Cycling Club ===
As of 24 January 2021.

Rider	Date of birth
Alina Abramenka (BLR)	26 October 2000 (age 25)
Darya Dziakola (BLR)	29 December 2000 (age 25)
Nastassia Kiptsikava (BLR)	10 August 1999 (age 26)
Anhelina Krasko (BLR)	16 December 2000 (age 25)

Rider	Date of birth
Taisa Naskovich (BLR)	19 September 1995 (age 30)
Karalina Savenka (BLR)	21 April 1998 (age 28)
Tatsiana Sharakova (BLR)	31 July 1984 (age 41)
Hanna Tserakh (BLR)	7 September 1998 (age 27)

=== Multum Accountants Ladies Cycling Team ===
As of 2 February 2021.

Rider	Date of birth
Anna Badegruber (AUT)	14 January 1997 (age 29)
Eefje Brandt (BEL)	22 May 2002 (age 24)
Marijke de Smedt (BEL)	17 May 1971 (age 55)
Fien De Wispelaere (BEL)	4 March 2002 (age 24)
Lara Defour (BEL)	12 November 1997 (age 28)
Fien Delbaere (BEL)	21 April 1996 (age 30)
Ann-Sophie Duyck (BEL)	23 July 1987 (age 38)
Leontine Farazijn (BEL)	1 April 2002 (age 24)

Rider	Date of birth
Sara Maes (BEL)	23 January 2002 (age 24)
Megan Panton (GBR)	16 January 2001 (age 25)
Lily Schuitemaker (NED)	14 July 1999 (age 26)
Julie Stockman (BEL)	17 August 1999 (age 26)
Rosalie van der Wolf (NED)	11 March 2001 (age 25)
Céline van Houtum (NED)	12 March 1997 (age 29)
Kylie Waterreus (NED)	22 March 1998 (age 28)

=== NXTG Racing ===
As of 24 January 2021.

Rider	Date of birth
Rozemarijn Ammerlaan (NED)	4 January 2000 (age 26)
Julia Borgström (SWE)	9 June 2001 (age 25)
Shari Bossuyt (BEL)	5 September 2000 (age 25)
Mylène de Zoete (NED)	3 January 1999 (age 27)
Cathalijne Hoolwerf (NED)	26 February 2000 (age 26)
Britt Knaven (BEL)	29 July 2000 (age 25)

Rider	Date of birth
Charlotte Kool (NED)	6 May 1999 (age 27)
Ilse Pluimers (NED)	29 April 2002 (age 24)
Maud Rijnbeek (NED)	3 December 2002 (age 23)
Amelia Sharpe (GBR)	24 July 2001 (age 24)
Catalina Soto (CHI)	8 April 2001 (age 25)
Emily Wadsworth (GBR)	8 August 1999 (age 26)

=== Parkhotel Valkenburg Cycling Team ===
As of 24 January 2021.

Rider	Date of birth
Mischa Bredewold (NED)	20 June 2000 (age 26)
Nina Buysman (NED)	16 November 1997 (age 28)
Belle de Gast (NED)	4 February 1991 (age 35)
Femke Gerritse (NED)	14 May 2001 (age 25)
Pien Limpens (NED)	24 February 2001 (age 25)
Femke Markus (NED)	17 November 1996 (age 29)
Lieke Nooijen (NED)	20 July 2001 (age 24)

Rider	Date of birth
Marit Raaijmakers (NED)	2 June 1999 (age 27)
Sylvie Swinkels (NED)	31 July 2000 (age 25)
Julia van Bokhoven (NED)	1 April 2001 (age 25)
Amber van der Hulst (NED)	21 September 1999 (age 26)
Kirstie van Haaften (NED)	21 January 1999 (age 27)
Esther van Veen (NED)	27 September 1990 (age 35)

=== Rally Cycling ===
As of 24 January 2021.

Rider	Date of birth
Madeline Bemis (USA)	20 October 1998 (age 27)
Holly Breck (USA)	27 May 1992 (age 34)
Katie Clouse (USA)	4 August 2001 (age 24)
Kristabel Doebel-Hickok (USA)	28 April 1989 (age 37)
Heidi Franz (USA)	14 January 1995 (age 31)
Leigh Ann Ganzar (USA)	8 September 1989 (age 36)

Rider	Date of birth
Clara Koppenburg (GER)	3 August 1995 (age 30)
Sara Poidevin (CAN)	7 May 1996 (age 30)
Olivia Ray (NZL)	4 July 1998 (age 28)
Emma White (USA)	23 August 1997 (age 28)
Lily Williams (USA)	24 June 1994 (age 32)

=== Río Miera–Cantabria Deporte ===
As of 26 January 2021.

Rider	Date of birth
Eva Anguela (ESP)	11 June 2002 (age 24)
Paula Díaz (ESP)	3 January 1997 (age 29)
Elisabet Escursell Valero (ESP)	30 October 1996 (age 29)
Carolina Esteban (ESP)	15 February 2001 (age 25)
Ania Horcajada (ESP)	23 February 2002 (age 24)
Alba Leonardo (ESP)	27 March 2002 (age 24)

Rider	Date of birth
Isabel Martín (ESP)	1 May 1999 (age 27)
Aida Nuño (ESP)	24 November 1983 (age 42)
Nerea Nuño (ESP)	12 July 1994 (age 31)
Fie Østerby (DNK)	10 May 1992 (age 34)
Susana Pérez (ESP)	15 November 2001 (age 24)
Laura Tenorio (ESP)	22 April 1998 (age 28)

=== Roxsolt Liv SRAM ===
As of 3 February 2021.

Rider	Date of birth
Justine Barrow (AUS)	7 March 1979 (age 47)
Saffron Button (AUS)	25 June 1996 (age 30)
Emma Chilton (AUS)	10 June 1998 (age 28)
Izzy Flint (AUS)	16 May 2002 (age 24)
Emily Herfoss (AUS)	24 July 1994 (age 31)
Nicola Macdonald (AUS)	2 June 1998 (age 28)

Rider	Date of birth
Peta Mullens (AUS)	8 March 1988 (age 38)
Franky Sewell (AUS)	18 December 2002 (age 23)
Courtney Sherwell (AUS)	6 July 1988 (age 38)
Carlee Taylor (AUS)	15 February 1989 (age 37)
Bree Wilson (AUS)	21 June 1987 (age 39)
Madeline Wright (AUS)	21 August 1985 (age 40)

=== Servetto–Makhymo–Beltrami TSA ===
As of 26 January 2021.

Rider	Date of birth
Carlotta Borello (ITA)	7 January 2002 (age 24)
Sara Casasola (ITA)	29 November 1999 (age 26)
Nadja Heigl (AUT)	15 February 1996 (age 30)
Tereza Korvasová (CZE)	29 June 1996 (age 30)

Rider	Date of birth
Rosalia Ortíz (ESP)	20 March 1999 (age 27)
Anna Potokina (RUS)	18 June 1987 (age 39)
Elis Simeoni (ITA)	24 April 1993 (age 33)
Asia Zontone (ITA)	4 November 2001 (age 24)

=== Sopela Women's Team ===
As of 26 January 2021.

Rider	Date of birth
Naia Amondarain (ESP)	13 February 2001 (age 25)
Ainara Arroyo (ESP)	15 January 1981 (age 45)
María Banlles (ESP)	15 September 2000 (age 25)
Inés Cantera (ESP)	30 July 2002 (age 23)
Anne de Pablo (ESP)	30 August 2002 (age 23)
María Gómez (ESP)	1983 (age 42–43)
Andrea Mediero (ESP)	22 November 1992 (age 33)
Emma Ortíz (ESP)	28 November 1998 (age 27)

Rider	Date of birth
Molly Patch (GBR)	12 July 1995 (age 30)
Carla Pruñonosa (ESP)	14 September 2002 (age 23)
Sofia Rodríguez (ESP)	21 October 1999 (age 26)
Natalia Saiz (ESP)	6 June 2002 (age 24)
Adriana San Román (ESP)	13 March 2002 (age 24)
Paula Soler (ESP)	2 June 2001 (age 25)
Claire Steels (GBR)	9 November 1986 (age 39)

=== Stade Rochelais Charente-Maritime ===
As of 27 January 2021.

Rider	Date of birth
Noémie Abgrall (FRA)	1 December 1999 (age 26)
Coralie Demay (FRA)	10 October 1992 (age 33)
Séverine Eraud (FRA)	24 February 1995 (age 31)
Annabel Fisher (GBR)	19 September 1989 (age 36)
India Grangier (FRA)	5 January 2000 (age 26)
Elodie Le Bail (FRA)	22 May 1990 (age 36)

Rider	Date of birth
Célia Le Mouel (FRA)	20 July 2000 (age 25)
Melanie Maurer (SUI)	17 June 1988 (age 38)
Noemi Rüegg (SUI)	19 April 2001 (age 25)
Manon Souyris (FRA)	30 June 1993 (age 33)
Maëva Squiban (FRA)	19 March 2002 (age 24)

=== Team Hitec Products ===
As of 22 January 2021.

Rider	Date of birth
Caroline Andersson (SWE)	29 July 2001 (age 24)
Pernille Feldmann (NOR)	1 February 2000 (age 26)
Ingvild Gåskjenn (NOR)	1 July 1998 (age 28)
Martine Gjøs (NOR)	19 January 2000 (age 26)
Claudia Koster (NED)	22 March 1992 (age 34)
Mieke Kröger (GER)	18 July 1993 (age 32)

Rider	Date of birth
Amalie Lutro (NOR)	15 March 2000 (age 26)
Silje Mathisen (NOR)	15 February 2001 (age 25)
Mari Mohr (NOR)	1 March 2001 (age 25)
Ann Helen Olsen (NOR)	7 February 1998 (age 28)
Christa Riffel (GER)	30 July 1998 (age 27)
Anne Dorthe Ysland (NOR)	9 April 2002 (age 24)

=== Team Illuminate ===
As of 1 February 2021.

Rider	Date of birth
Shani Berger (ISR)	18 April 2001 (age 25)
Kulacha Chairin (THA)	16 November 1988 (age 37)
Annick Chalier (USA)	11 August 1978 (age 47)
Helena Coney (CAN)	7 February 1983 (age 43)

Rider	Date of birth
Shoko Kashiki (JPN)	9 November 1993 (age 32)
Kemille King (USA)	2 January 1977 (age 49)
Doris Schweizer (SUI)	28 August 1989 (age 36)
Starla Teddergreen (USA)	11 December 1979 (age 46)

=== Team Jumbo–Visma ===
As of 23 January 2021.

Rider	Date of birth
Teuntje Beekhuis (NED)	18 August 1995 (age 30)
Anna Henderson (GBR)	14 November 1998 (age 27)
Romy Kasper (GER)	5 May 1988 (age 38)
Anouska Koster (NED)	20 August 1993 (age 32)
Riejanne Markus (NED)	1 September 1994 (age 31)
Pernille Mathiesen (DEN)	5 October 1997 (age 28)

Rider	Date of birth
Aafke Soet (NED)	23 November 1997 (age 28)
Karlijn Swinkels (NED)	28 October 1998 (age 27)
Julie Van de Velde (BEL)	2 June 1993 (age 33)
Jip van den Bos (NED)	12 April 1996 (age 30)
Nancy van der Burg (NED)	18 May 1992 (age 34)
Marianne Vos (NED)	13 May 1987 (age 39)

=== Team Rupelcleaning–Champion Lubricants ===
As of 30 January 2021.

Rider	Date of birth
Isabelle Beckers (BEL)	4 March 1983 (age 43)
Svenja Betz (GER)	15 September 1995 (age 30)
Verena Eberhardt (AUT)	6 December 1994 (age 31)
Lara Gillespie (IRL)	21 April 2001 (age 25)
Mia Griffin (IRL)	30 December 1998 (age 27)
Antonia Gröndahl (FIN)	25 May 1995 (age 31)
Gabriella Homer (IRL)	10 September 2000 (age 25)
Amber Lacompte (BEL)	1 January 2000 (age 26)

Rider	Date of birth
Ditte Lenseclaes (BEL)	22 June 1999 (age 27)
Lucy Mayrhofer (GER)	20 September 2002 (age 23)
Kelly Murphy (IRL)	3 November 1989 (age 36)
Maja Perinović (CRO)	24 September 1999 (age 26)
Trine Schmidt (DEN)	3 June 1988 (age 38)
Aline Seitz (SUI)	17 February 1997 (age 29)
Alice Sharpe (IRL)	3 May 1994 (age 32)
Sara Van de Vel (BEL)	6 August 1994 (age 31)

=== Tibco–Silicon Valley Bank ===
As of 27 January 2021.

Rider	Date of birth
Eva Buurman (NED)	7 September 1994 (age 31)
Leah Dixon (GBR)	26 August 1991 (age 34)
Tanja Erath (GER)	7 October 1989 (age 36)
Kristen Faulkner (USA)	18 December 1992 (age 33)
Sarah Gigante (AUS)	6 October 2000 (age 25)
Clara Honsinger (USA)	5 June 1997 (age 29)
Nina Kessler (NED)	4 July 1988 (age 38)

Rider	Date of birth
Emma Langley (USA)	23 November 1995 (age 30)
Emily Newsom (USA)	4 September 1983 (age 42)
Diana Peñuela (COL)	8 September 1986 (age 39)
Lauren Stephens (USA)	28 December 1986 (age 39)
Maddy Ward (USA)	25 July 1994 (age 31)
Eri Yonamine (JPN)	25 April 1991 (age 35)

=== Top Girls Fassa Bortolo ===
As of 28 January 2021.

Rider	Date of birth
Michela Balducci (ITA)	30 March 1995 (age 31)
Giorgia Bariani (ITA)	19 November 2000 (age 25)
Elisa Dalla Valle (ITA)	16 January 1998 (age 28)
Erika Jesenko (SLO)	14 April 1996 (age 30)
Greta Marturano (ITA)	14 June 1998 (age 28)

Rider	Date of birth
Gaia Masetti (ITA)	26 October 2001 (age 24)
Vanessa Michieletto (ITA)	5 March 2002 (age 24)
Iris Monticolo (ITA)	15 July 2000 (age 25)
Debora Silvestri (ITA)	8 May 1998 (age 28)
Giorgia Vettorello (ITA)	6 July 2000 (age 26)

=== Valcar–Travel & Service ===
As of 28 January 2021.

Rider	Date of birth
Martina Alzini (ITA)	10 February 1997 (age 29)
Alice Maria Arzuffi (ITA)	19 November 1994 (age 31)
Elisa Balsamo (ITA)	27 February 1998 (age 28)
Matilde Bertolini (ITA)	24 September 2002 (age 23)
Chiara Consonni (ITA)	24 June 1999 (age 27)
Eleonora Gasparrini (ITA)	25 March 2002 (age 24)
Vittoria Guazzini (ITA)	26 December 2000 (age 25)
Silvia Magri (ITA)	17 October 2000 (age 25)

Rider	Date of birth
Barbara Malcotti (ITA)	19 February 2000 (age 26)
Silvia Persico (ITA)	25 July 1997 (age 28)
Federica Piergiovanni (ITA)	30 July 2001 (age 24)
Elena Pirrone (ITA)	21 February 1999 (age 27)
Silvia Pollicini (ITA)	31 December 1998 (age 27)
Ilaria Sanguineti (ITA)	15 April 1994 (age 32)
Miriam Vece (ITA)	16 March 1997 (age 29)
Margaux Vigie (FRA)	21 July 1995 (age 30)

=== WCC Team ===
As of 28 January 2021.

Rider	Date of birth
Selam Amha (ETH)	3 September 1997 (age 28)
Fatima El Hayani (MAR)	23 July 1996 (age 29)
Akvilė Gedraitytė (LTU)	14 February 2001 (age 25)
Veronika Jandová (CZE)	1 August 2001 (age 24)

Rider	Date of birth
Desiet Kidane (ERI)	10 October 2000 (age 25)
Anastasiya Kolesava (BLR)	2 June 2000 (age 26)
Tereza Medveďová (SVK)	27 March 1996 (age 30)
Magdeleine Vallieres (CAN)	10 August 2001 (age 24)
