= 2019 Women's Tour de Yorkshire =

5th women's Tour de Yorkshire

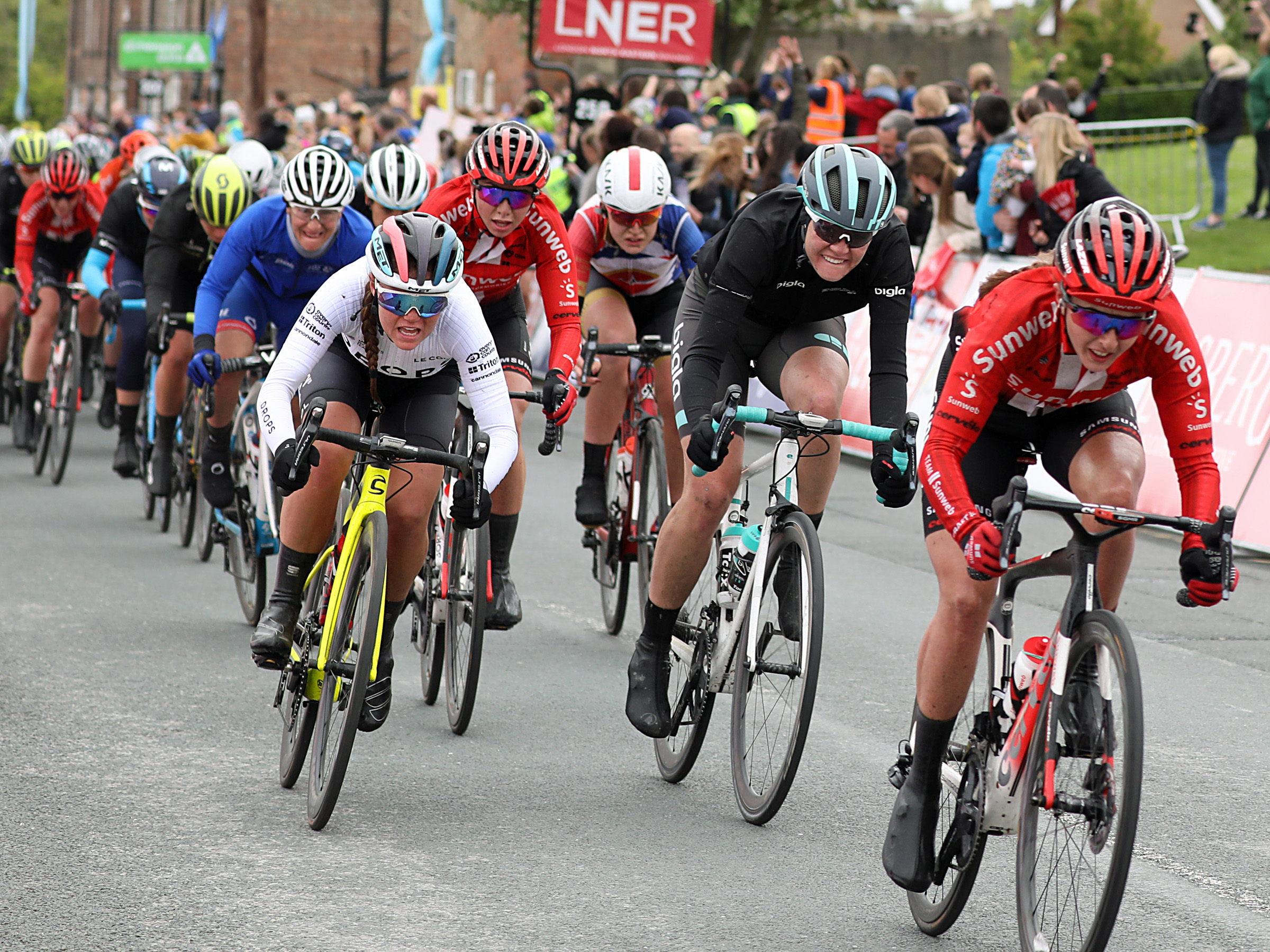
- The sprint on the run up to the finish line at Bedale (Stage two)

Race details
- Dates: 3–4 May 2019
- Stages: 2
- Distance: 264 km (164 mi)

Results
Jersey awarded to the overall winner	Winner	Marianne Vos (NED)	(CCC - Liv)
	Second	Mavi Garcia (SPA)	(Movistar Team)
	Third	Soraya Paladin (ITA)	(Alé–Cipollini)
Jersey awarded to the points classification winner	Points	Christine Majerus (LUX)	(Boels–Dolmans)
Jersey awarded to the mountains classification winner	Mountains	Mavi Garcia (SPA)	(Movistar Team)

The 2019 Women's Tour de Yorkshire was a two-day cycling stage race staged in Yorkshire over 3 and 4 May 2019. It was the fourth edition of the Women's Tour de Yorkshire, organised by Welcome to Yorkshire and the Amaury Sport Organisation. It was the second time the race was organised as a stage race. For the first time, the race was live broadcast in full on ITV4 in 2019.

== Route ==
Stage characteristics and winners
Stage	Date	Start	Finish	Length	Type	Winner
1	3 May	Barnsley	Bedale	132 km (82.0 miles)	Hilly stage	Lorena Wiebes (NED)
2	4 May	Bridlington	Scarborough	132 km (82.0 miles)	Hilly stage	Marianne Vos (NED)

== Teams ==
Eighteen teams professional teams and a British national team, each with a maximum of six riders, participated in the race:

Professional women's teams

- Boels–Dolmans
- Canyon//SRAM
- Mitchelton–Scott
- Trek–Segafredo
- Parkhotel Valkenburg
- FDJ Nouvelle-Aquitaine Futuroscope
- Bigla Pro Cycling
- Team Sunweb
- Alé–Cipollini
- CCC - Liv
- WNT–Rotor Pro Cycling
- Valcar–Cylance
- Movistar Team
- Health Mate–Cyclelive Team
- Tibco–Silicon Valley Bank
- Drops
- Storey Racing
- Brother UK-Tifosi

National teams

- UK

== Classification leadership table ==
Stage	Winner	General classification	Points classification	Mountains classification	Combativity prize	Teams classification
1	Lorena Wiebes (NED)	Lorena Wiebes (NED)	Lorena Wiebes (NED)	Lizzy Banks (UK)	Leah Dixon (UK)	Team Sunweb
2	Marianne Vos (NED)	Marianne Vos (NED)	Christine Majerus (LUX)	Mavi Garcia (SPA)	Lizzie Deignan (UK)	Boels–Dolmans
Final		Marianne Vos (NED)	Christine Majerus (LUX)	Mavi Garcia (SPA)	not awarded	Boels–Dolmans

== Stages ==
=== Stage 1 ===
Stage 1 result

Rank	Rider	Team	Time
1	Lorena Wiebes (NED)	Parkhotel Valkenburg	3h 35' 24"
2	Christine Majerus (LUX)	Boels–Dolmans	s.t.
3	Alison Jackson (CAN)	Tibco–Silicon Valley Bank	s.t.
4	Roxane Fournier (FRA)	FDJ Nouvelle-Aquitaine Futuroscope	s.t.
5	Lisa Brennauer (GER)	WNT–Rotor Pro Cycling	s.t.
6	Susanne Andersen (NOR)	Team Sunweb	s.t.
7	Elisa Balsamo (ITA)	Valcar–Cylance	s.t.
8	Anna Henderson (UK)	Brother UK–Tifosi p/b OnForm	s.t.
9	Emilia Fahlin (SWE)	FDJ Nouvelle-Aquitaine Futuroscope	s.t.
10	Sarah Roy (AUS)	Mitchelton–Scott	s.t.

General classification after Stage 1

Rank	Rider	Team	Time
1	Lorena Wiebes (NED)	Parkhotel Valkenburg	3h 35' 24"
2	Christine Majerus (LUX)	Boels–Dolmans	+ 3"
3	Alison Jackson (CAN)	Tibco–Silicon Valley Bank	+ 6"
4	Susanne Andersen (NOR)	Team Sunweb	+ 7"
5	Lauren Kitchen (AUS)	FDJ Nouvelle-Aquitaine Futuroscope	+ 7"
6	Marianne Vos (NED)	CCC - Liv	+ 8"
7	Maria Giulia Confalonieri (ITA)	Valcar–Cylance	+ 8"
8	Ingrid Lorvik (NOR)	Hitec Products–Birk Sport	+ 9"
9	Roxane Fournier (FRA)	FDJ Nouvelle-Aquitaine Futuroscope	+ 10"
10	Lisa Brennauer (GER)	WNT–Rotor Pro Cycling	+ 10"

=== Stage 2 ===
Stage 2 result

Rank	Rider	Team	Time
1	Marianne Vos (NED)	CCC - Liv	3h 59' 16"
2	Mavi García (ESP)	Movistar Team	s.t.
3	Soraya Paladin (ITA)	Alé–Cipollini	s.t.
4	Christine Majerus (LUX)	Boels–Dolmans	+ 1'22"
5	Amanda Spratt (AUS)	Mitchelton–Scott	s.t.
6	Lisa Brennauer (GER)	WNT–Rotor Pro Cycling	+ 1'37"
7	Alice Maria Arzuffi (ITA)	Valcar–Cylance	+ 2'01"
8	Hannah Barnes (UK)	Canyon//SRAM	+ 2'06"
9	Lizzy Banks (UK)	Bigla Pro Cycling	+ 2'26"
10	Liane Lippert (GER)	Team Sunweb	+ 2'39"

General classification after Stage 2

Rank	Rider	Team	Time
1	Marianne Vos (NED)	CCC - Liv	7h 34' 27"
2	Mavi García (ESP)	Movistar Team	+ 7"
3	Soraya Paladin (ITA)	Alé–Cipollini	+ 9"
4	Christine Majerus (LUX)	Boels–Dolmans	+ 1'28"
5	Amanda Spratt (AUS)	Mitchelton–Scott	+ 1'35"
6	Lisa Brennauer (GER)	WNT–Rotor Pro Cycling	+ 1'50"
7	Alice Maria Arzuffi (ITA)	Valcar–Cylance	+ 2'14"
8	Hannah Barnes (UK)	Canyon//SRAM	+ 2'19"
9	Lizzy Banks (UK)	Bigla Pro Cycling	+ 2'36"
10	Liane Lippert (GER)	Team Sunweb	+ 2'50"

== See also ==
- 2019 in women's road cycling
