= Marieke de Groot =

Dutch cyclist

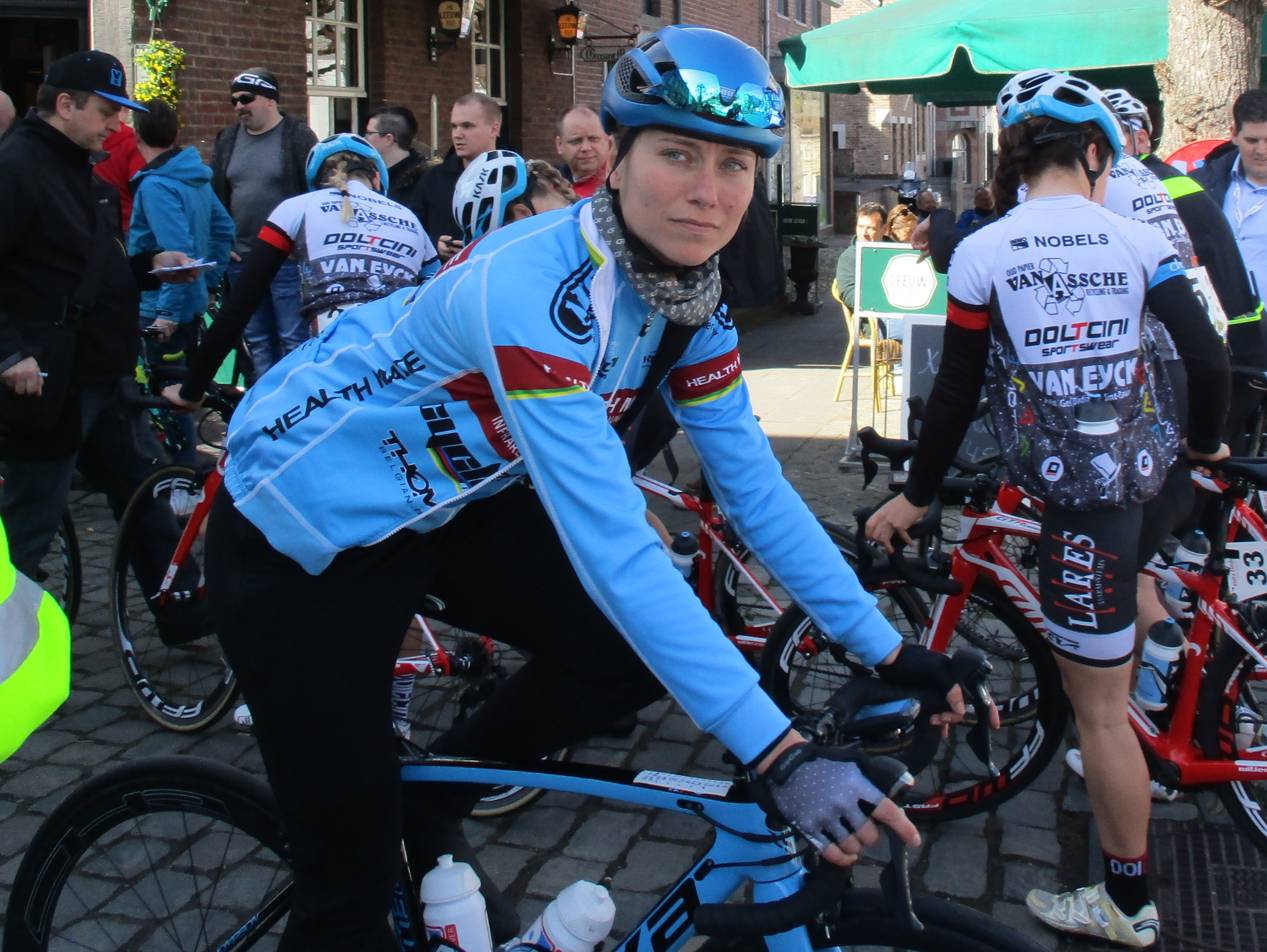
- Marieke de Groot in 2018

Personal information
- Born: 29 October 1985 (age 40)

Cycling career
- Sport: Cycling
- Current team: Proximus–Cyclis
- Discipline: Road
- Role: Rider

Amateur teams
- 2016–2017: Swaboladies.nl
- 2019: Jos Feron Lady Force
- 2022–2023: Isorex No Aqua

Professional teams
- 2018: Health Mate–Cyclelive Team
- 2020–2021: Doltcini–Van Eyck Sport
- 2024: Proximus–Cyclis

Marieke de Groot (born 29 October 1985) is a Dutch professional racing cyclist, who currently rides for UCI Women's Continental Team Proximus–Cyclis. In 2018 she rode for Health Mate–Cyclelive Team and in 2020 and 2021 for Doltcini–Van Eyck–Proximus. In October 2020, she rode in the women's edition of the 2020 Liège–Bastogne–Liège race in Belgium.
