= Melissa Lowther =

English cyclist

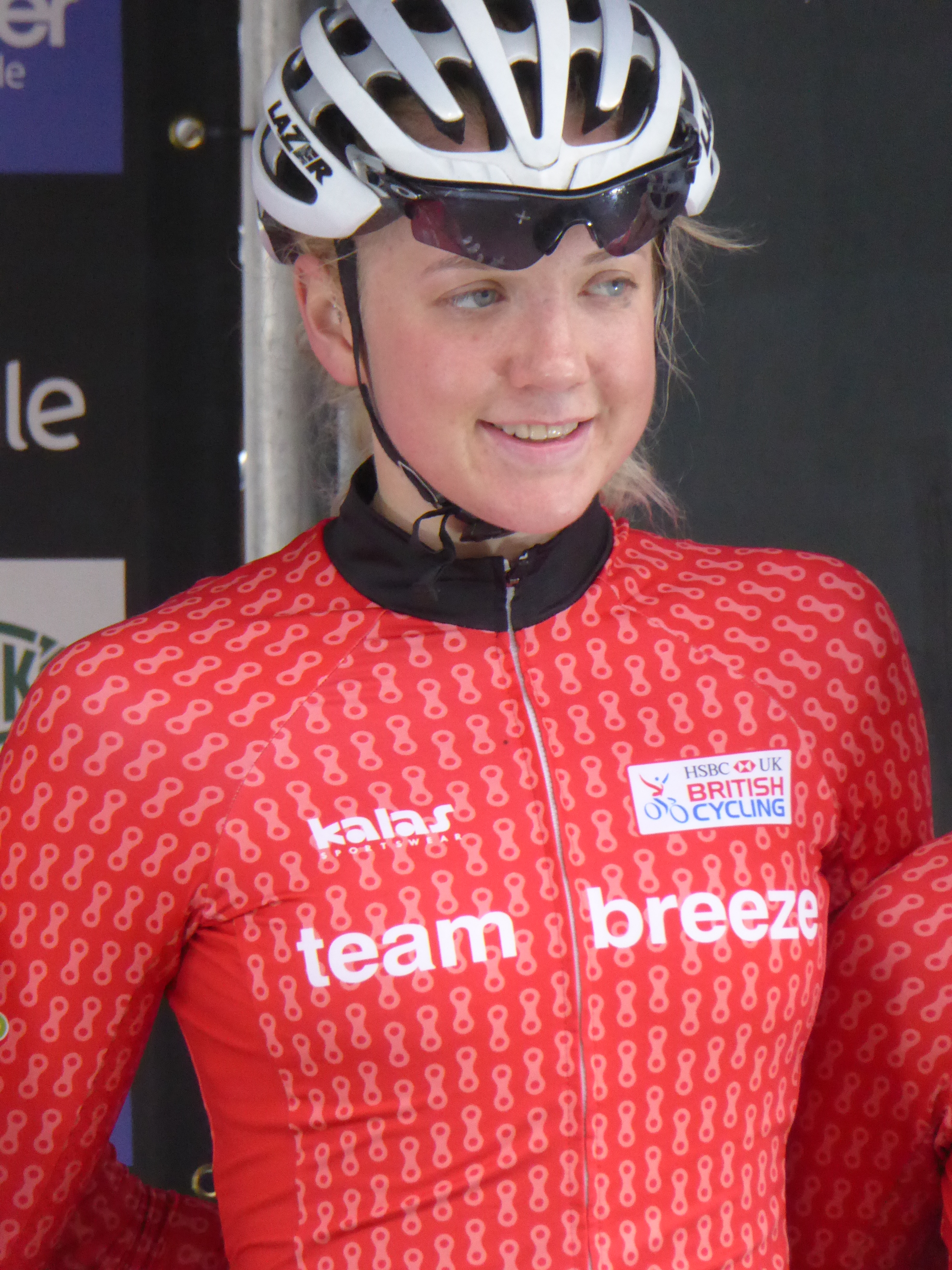
- Lowther in 2017

Personal information
- Full name: Melissa Lowther
- Born: 15 May 1996 (age 30) Wakefield, West Yorkshire, England

Cycling career
- Sport: Cycling
- Discipline: Road
- Role: Rider

Amateur teams
- 2014: Matrix Racing Academy
- 2016–2017: Team Breeze

Professional teams
- 2015: Matrix Fitness Pro Cycling
- 2018: WNT–Rotor Pro Cycling
- 2018: Storey Racing

Melissa Lowther (born 15 May 1996) is an English professional racing cyclist, who last rode for UCI Women's Team Storey Racing. Lowther won the Under-23 British National Road Race Championships in 2017.

Lowther learnt the day before the time trial at the 2018 Commonwealth Games that she would not be allowed to compete because a Team England administrator had neglected to tick a box on an entry form.

== Career results ==
2014
7th Time trial, UCI Junior Road World Championships
2015
3rd Scratch Race, Revolution - Round 3, London
2016
3rd Points Race, Revolution - Round 3, Manchester
2017
1st Road race, National Under-23 Road Championships
5th Road race, National Road Championships
7th Road race UEC European Under-23 Road Championships
2018
9th Road race Commonwealth Games

== See also ==
- List of 2015 UCI Women's Teams and riders
