= Jesse Vandenbulcke =

Belgian cyclist

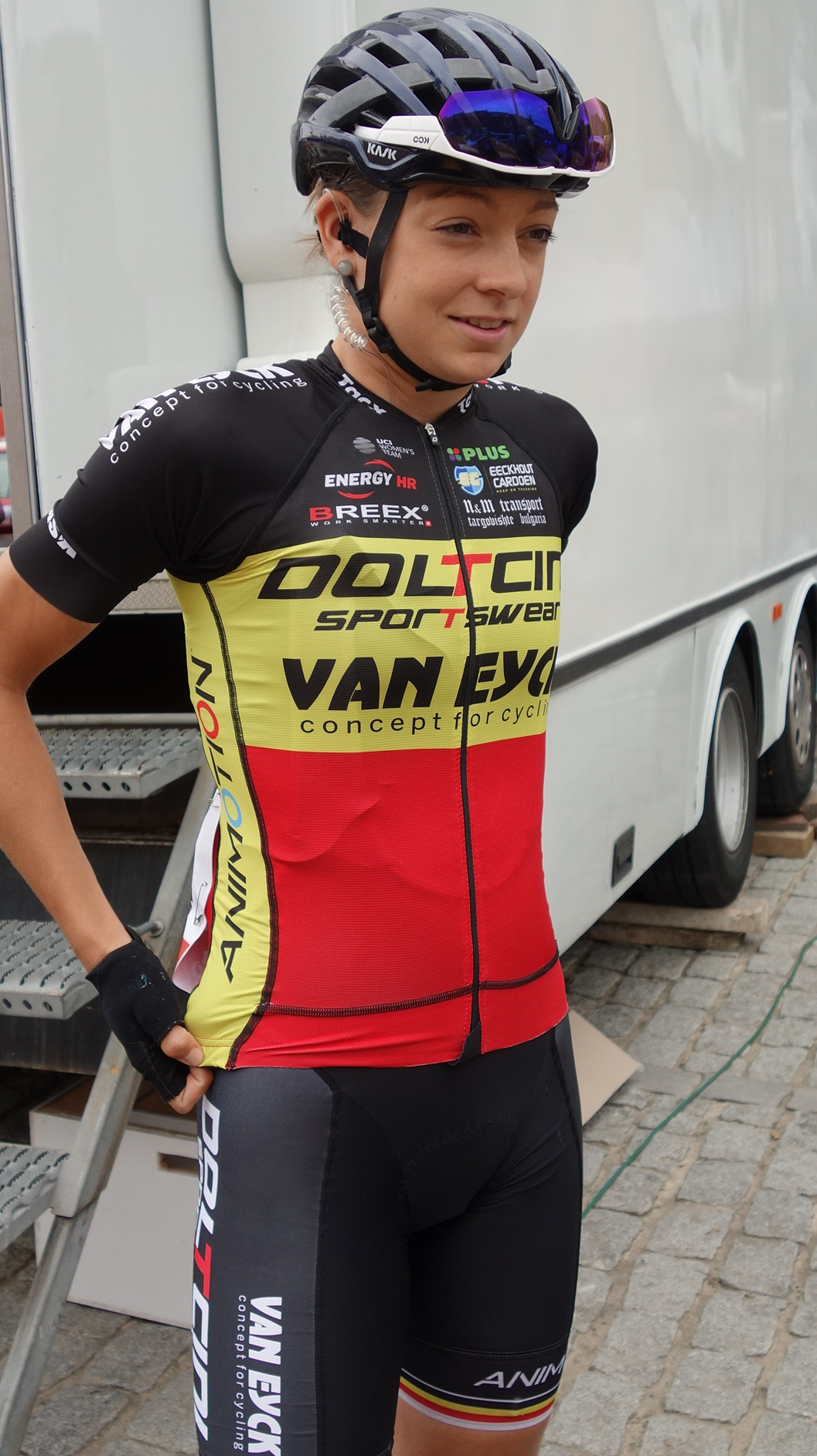
- Vandenbulcke in 2019.

Personal information
- Full name: Jesse Vandenbulcke
- Born: 17 January 1996 (age 30) Geluwe, Belgium

Cycling career
- Sport: Cycling
- Current team: De Ceuster Bouwpunt Cycling Team
- Discipline: Road
- Role: Rider

Amateur teams
- 2018: Keukens Redant
- 2024–: De Ceuster Bouwpunt Cycling Team

Professional teams
- 2015: Lotto–Soudal Ladies
- 2016: Lares–Waowdeals
- 2019: Doltcini–Van Eyck Sport
- 2020–2021: Lotto–Soudal Ladies
- 2022: Le Col–Wahoo
- 2023: Human Powered Health
Medal record
Women's road bicycle racing
Representing Belgium
European Championships
Bronze medal – third place	2024 Limburg	Mixed team relay

Jesse Vandenbulcke (born 17 January 1996) is a Belgian professional racing cyclist, who currently rides for club team De Ceuster Bouwpunt Cycling Team.

== Major results ==
2014
National Junior Road Championships

1st Time trial
3rd Road race

2019
1st Road race, National Road Championships
2021
5th Time trial, National Road Championships
5th Omloop van de Westhoek
2022
2nd Grote Prijs Beerens
9th Overall RideLondon Classique
2023
1st Aphrodite's Sanctuary Cycling Race
7th Costa De Almería
2024
3rd Mixed relay, European Road Championships
6th Cyclis Classic
