= Gabriella Shaw =

British cyclist

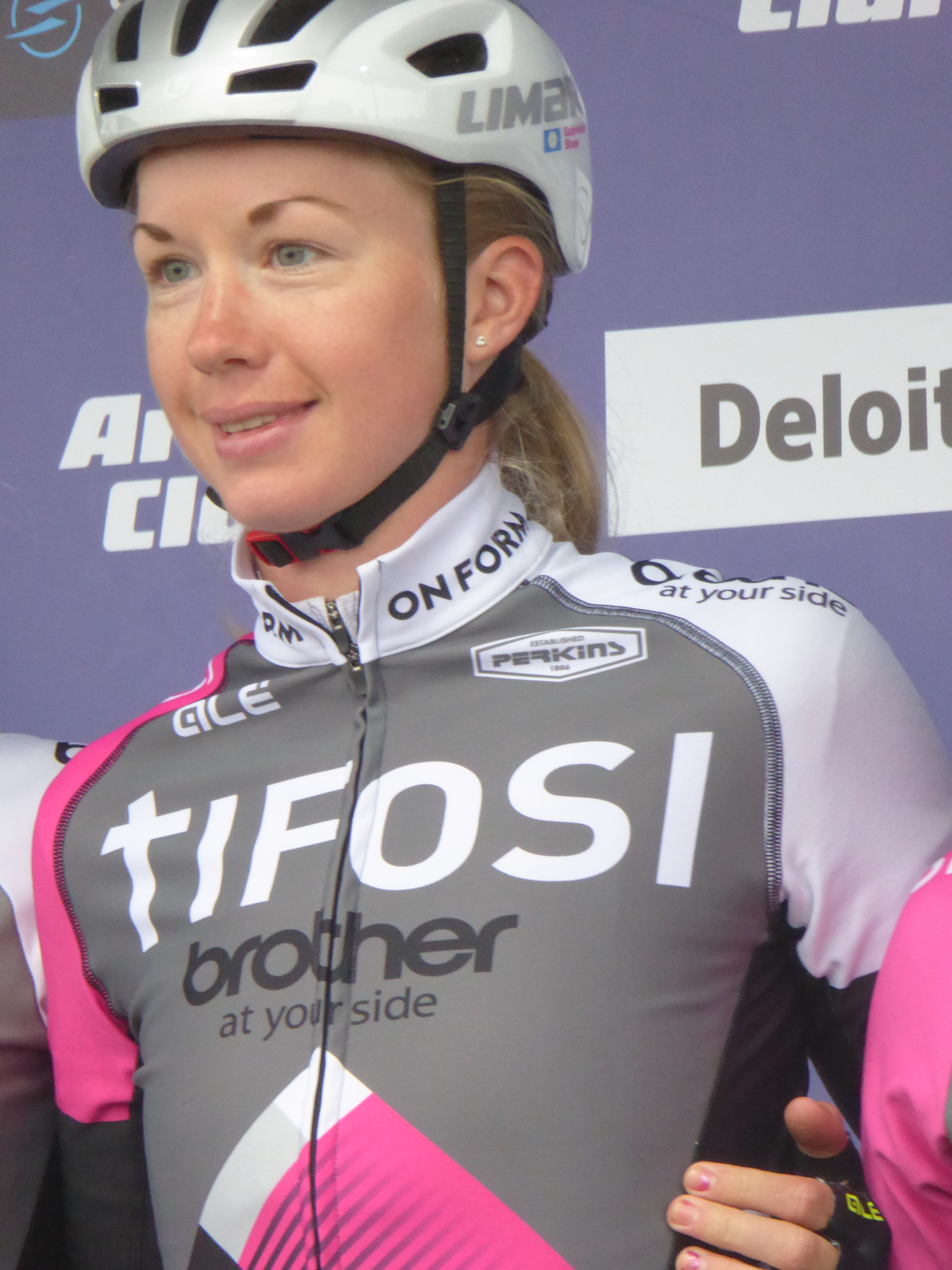
- Shaw at the 2019 Women's Tour of Scotland

Personal information
- Born: 22 June 1992 (age 34)

Cycling career
- Sport: Cycling
- Current team: Retired
- Discipline: Road
- Role: Rider

Amateur teams
- 2006: Leeds Mercury Cycling Club
- 2007–2010: Wills Bros Racing
- 2011: YRDP
- 2012: All Terrain Cycles Ride in Peace
- 2013–2015: Breast Cancer Care Cycling Team
- 2018: NJC–Biemme–Echelon
- 2019: Brother UK–Tifosi
- 2022: Spectra Racing

Professional teams
- 2016: Podium Ambition Pro Cycling
- 2017: Team WNT
- 2020–2021: CAMS–Tifosi

Gabriella Shaw (born 22 June 1992) is a British former racing cyclist, who competed entirely for British teams, including UCI Women's Teams Podium Ambition Pro Cycling, Team WNT and CAMS–Basso Bikes. She finished third in the 2019 British National Circuit Race Championships, won by her teammate Rebecca Durrell.
