= Lizzy Banks =

English cyclist

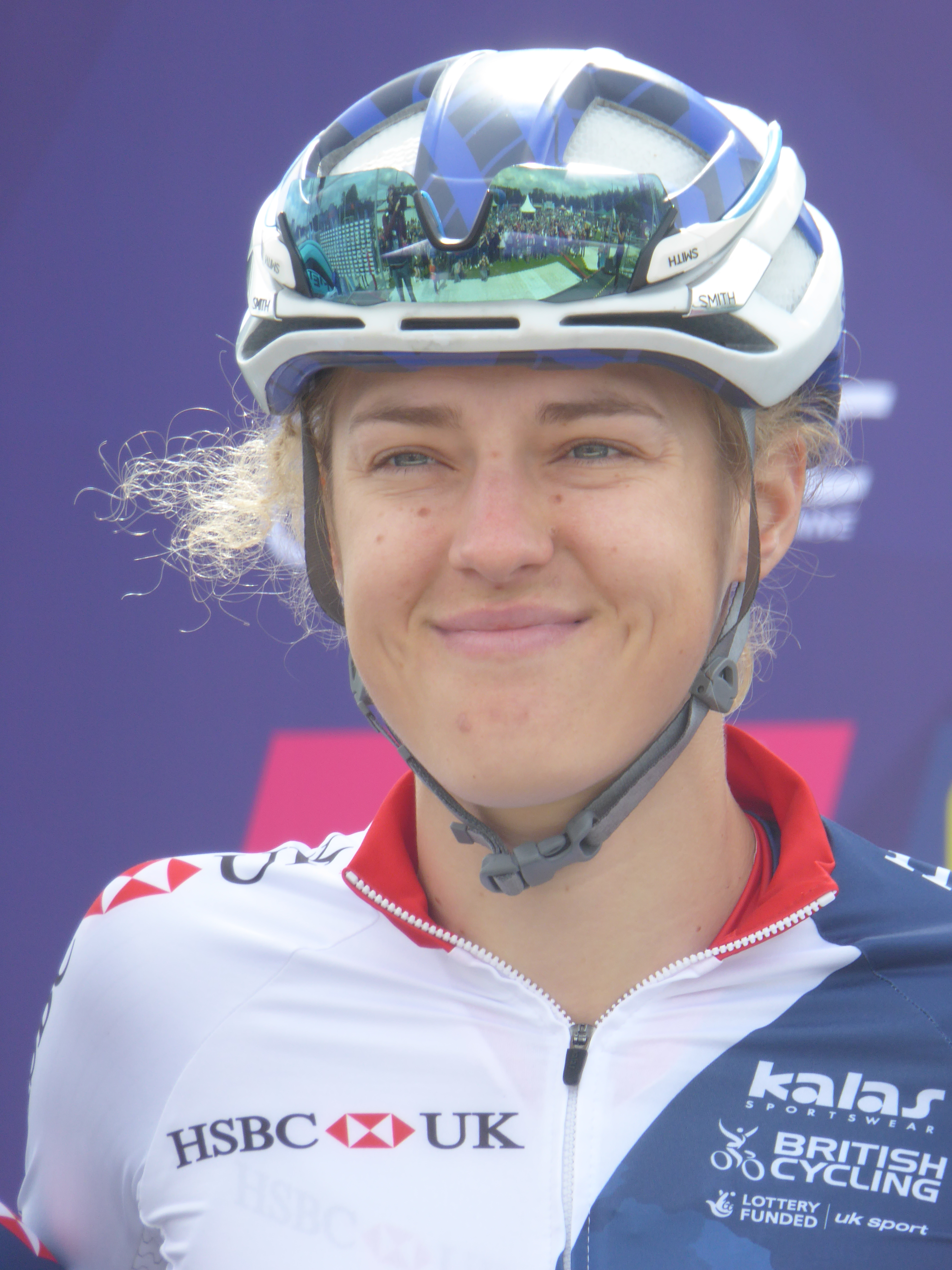
- Banks at the 2018 European Road Cycling Championships.

Personal information
- Full name: Elizabeth Mary Lydia Banks
- Nickname: Lizzy
- Born: Elizabeth Mary Lydia Stedman; 7 November 1990 (age 35) Malvern, Worcestershire, England

Cycling career
- Sport: Cycling
- Current team: Retired
- Discipline: Road
- Role: Rider

Amateur teams
- 2015: University of Sheffield
- 2016: Brother UK–Fusion RT
- 2017: Sunsport Velo
- 2017: Storey Racing

Professional teams
- 2018: UnitedHealthcare
- 2019–2020: Bigla Pro Cycling
- 2021: Ceratizit–WNT Pro Cycling
- 2022–2023: EF Education–Tibco–SVB

Major wins
- Major Tours Giro d'Italia 2 individual stages (2019, 2020)

Elizabeth Mary Lydia Banks (née Stedman; born 7 November 1990) is an English former professional racing cyclist, who rode for UCI Women's Continental Team EF Education–Tibco–SVB until 2023. Banks took up cycle racing in 2015 after participating in bicycle touring and cycling to clinical placements as a medical student. She left her medical studies shortly before she was due to graduate in order to pursue her cycling career.

Among her career highlights, Banks won two stages of the women's Giro d'Italia in 2019 and 2020.

In July 2023, Banks was provisionally suspended for testing positive for formoterol and chlortalidone in an out-of-competition test carried out in May 2023. The following April UK Anti-Doping (UKAD) ruled that she bore "no fault or negligence" for the anti-doping rule violation and therefore would be issued with no period of ineligibility. However, WADA appealed the decision and in April 2025 the Court of Arbitration for Sport (CAS) overturned the UKAD decision and issued Banks with a two-year ban set to run from April 2025 to April 2027. Banks appealed that decision and in July 2025 CAS revised the period of ineligibility to May 2023 to May 2025.

Banks announced her retirement from professional cycling in May 2024.

== Major results ==
2018
9th Chrono Gatineau
2019
1st Stage 8 Giro Rosa
2nd SwissEver GP Cham-Hagendorn
3rd Overall Grand Prix Elsy Jacobs
5th Overall Giro delle Marche in Rosa
7th Overall The Women's Tour
9th Overall Women's Tour de Yorkshire
2020
1st Stage 4 Giro Rosa
2nd GP de Plouay
6th Omloop Het Nieuwsblad
