= Bäckstedt =

Bäckstedt is a surname. Notable people with the surname include:

- Elynor Bäckstedt (born 2001), Welsh cyclist
- Magnus Bäckstedt (born 1975), Swedish former cyclist
- Zoe Bäckstedt (born 2004), Welsh cyclist
