= Lotte Rotman =

Belgian cyclist

Personal information
- Born: 19 June 1999 (age 27)

Cycling career
- Sport: Cycling
- Role: Rider

Professional team
- 2019: Health Mate–Cyclelive Team

Lotte Rotman (born 19 June 1999) is a Belgian professional racing cyclist. She rode for the UCI Women's Team Health Mate–Cyclelive Team for the 2019 women's road cycling season.
