= Lara Defour =

Belgian cyclist

Personal information
- Full name: Lara Defour
- Born: 12 November 1997 (age 28)

Cycling career
- Sport: Cycling
- Discipline: Road
- Role: Rider

Professional teams
- 2018–2019: Health Mate–Cyclelive Team
- 2020–2022: Multum Accountants–LSK Ladies

Lara Defour (born 12 November 1997) is a Belgian professional racing cyclist, who rode for UCI Women's Continental Team Multum Accountants Ladies.
