= Clarus Merquimia Group–Strongman =

Colombian women's road cycling team

Team information
- Registered: Colombia
- Founded: 2023
- Discipline: Road
- Status: UCI Women's Continental Team (2023–)

Team name history
- 2023–: Clarus Merquimia Group–Strongman

Clarus Merquimia Group–Strongman is a Colombian women's road cycling team that was founded in 2023.

== Major results ==
2023
Overall Vuelta Femenina a Guatemala, Lilibeth Chacón

Stages 1 & 3, Lilibeth Chacón

Overall Vuelta a Colombia Femenina, Lilibeth Chacón

Stage 3, Lilibeth Chacón

== National Champions ==
2023
Venezuela Time Trial, Lilibeth Chacón
Venezuela Road Race, Lilibeth Chacón
