= Rebecca Durrell =

British cyclist

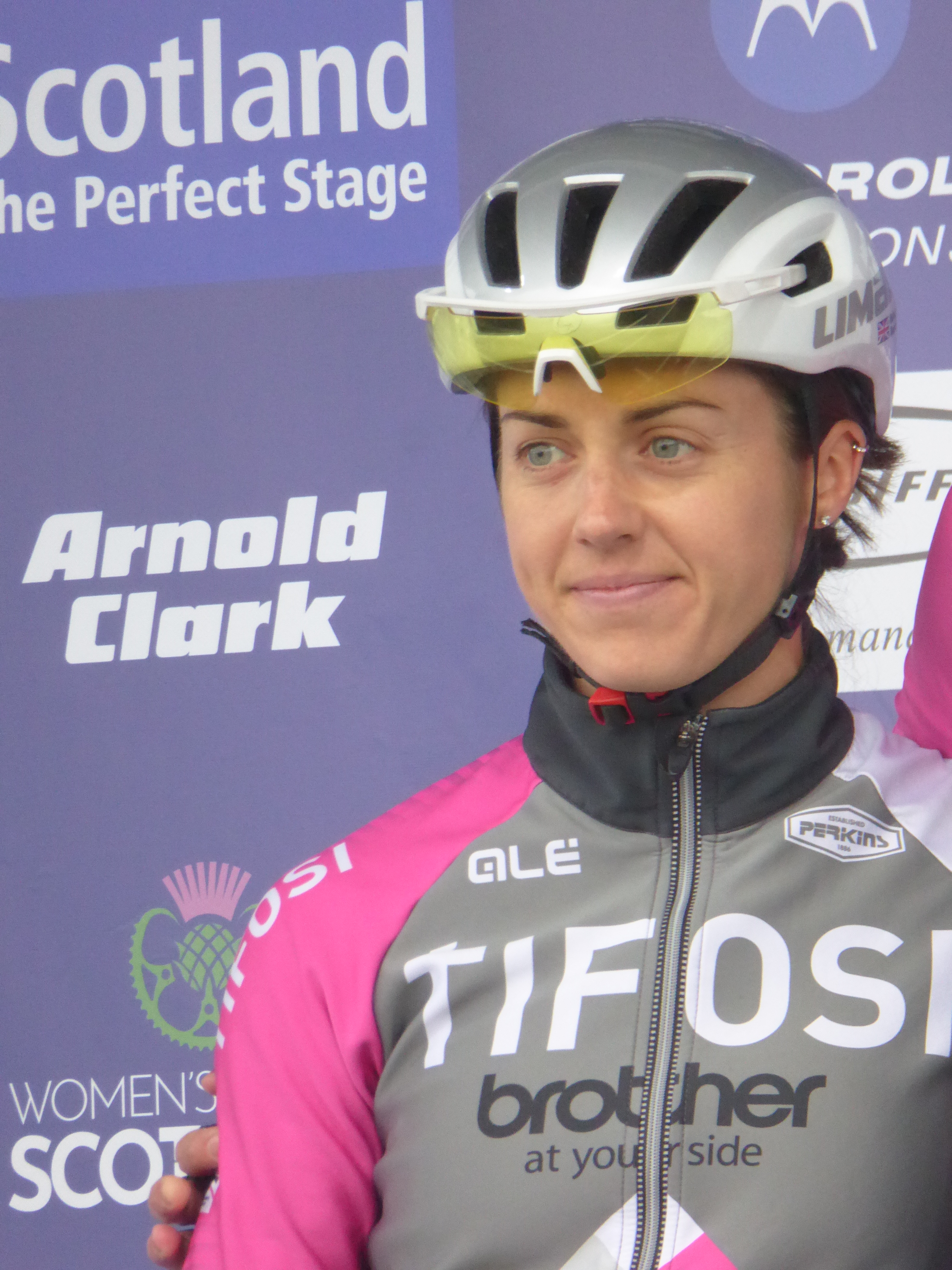
- Durrell at the 2019 Women's Tour of Scotland

Personal information
- Full name: Rebecca Durrell
- Born: Rebecca Nixon; 25 August 1988 (age 38)

Cycling career
- Sport: Cycling
- Current team: Retired
- Discipline: Road
- Role: Rider

Amateur teams
- 2014: Team Meadowlark
- 2015: Fusion RT Fierlan
- 2015: Aprire Bicycles–HSS Hire
- 2015: Team Velosport–Pasta Montegrappa
- 2019: Brother UK–Tifosi
- 2019: Tibco–Silicon Valley Bank (stagiaire)
- 2022: Team Spectra Wiggle p/b Vitus

Professional teams
- 2016–2017: Drops
- 2018: Storey Racing
- 2020–2021: CAMS–Tifosi

Rebecca Durrell (née Nixon; born 25 August 1988) is a British former professional racing cyclist, who competed between 2014 and 2022 for several British domestic teams and UCI Women's Teams Drops, Storey Racing and CAMS–Basso Bikes. Durrell was the winner of the 2017 Matrix Fitness Grand Prix Series, held alongside the men's Tour Series competition.

== Major results ==
2017
1st Overall Matrix Fitness Grand Prix Series

1st Stevenage

2018
1st Lincoln Grand Prix
2019
1st Circuit race, National Road Championships
Tour Series

1st Birkenhead
1st Salisbury

4th Overall Kreiz Breizh Elites Dames
4th Erondegemse Pijl
6th Aphrodite Cycling Race Individual Time Trial
9th Aphrodite's Sanctuary Cycling Race

== See also ==
- List of 2016 UCI Women's Teams and riders
