= Natalie Grinczer =

British cyclist (born 1993)

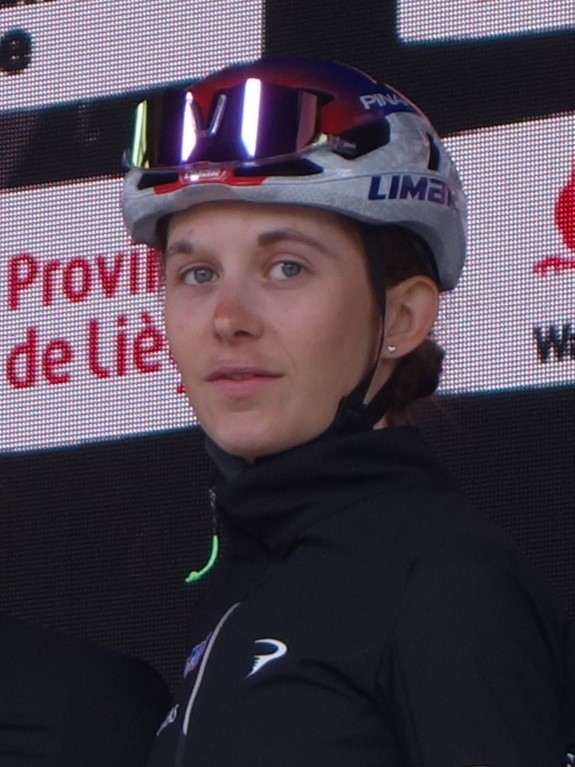
- Grinczer at 2024 La Flèche Wallonne Féminine

Personal information
- Full name: Natalie Grinczer
- Born: 15 November 1993 (age 32)

Cycling career
- Sport: Cycling
- Current team: Roland Le Dévoluy
- Discipline: Road
- Role: Rider

Amateur teams
- 2013: Abergavenny Road Club
- 2014–2015: Brother UK Fusion RT
- 2016: WNT Development Team

Professional teams
- 2017–2018: Team WNT
- 2019: Bizkaia–Durango
- 2020–2021: CAMS–Tifosi
- 2022–2023: Stade Rochelais Charente-Maritime
- 2023: Lifeplus Wahoo
- 2024–: Roland

Natalie Grinczer (born 15 November 1993) is a British professional racing cyclist, who currently rides for UCI Women's WorldTeam Roland Le Dévoluy.

Grinczer won the stage 4 Time Trial at Rás na mBan 2015. She won the Queen of the Mountains Classification in 2019 at the same race where she also achieved her 5th top 5 finish overall, making the podium for 3rd in 2017.

Grinczer competed in the 2023 edition of the British National Road Race Championships. After finding herself in a front group of nine riders, she was initially dropped by an attack from Claire Steels on Skelton Green, however rejoined the front group on the descent and eventually finished in sixth position.
