= Fien Delbaere =

Belgian cyclist

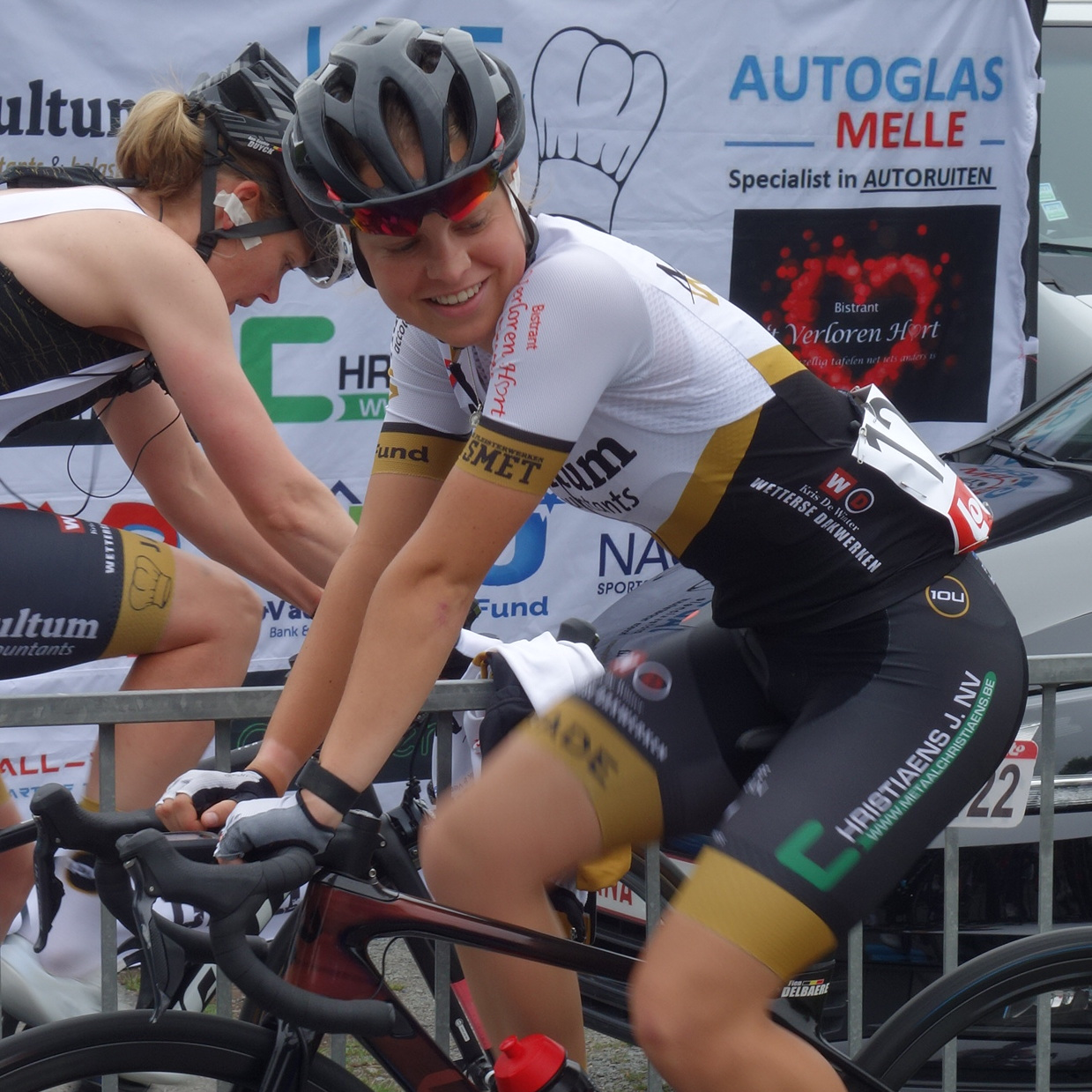
- Delbaere in 2021

Personal information
- Full name: Fien Delbaere
- Born: 21 April 1996 (age 30)

Cycling career
- Sport: Cycling
- Discipline: Road
- Role: Rider

Amateur team
- 2018: Autoglas Wetteren

Professional teams
- 2015–2017: Topsport Vlaanderen–Pro-Duo
- 2019: Health Mate–Cyclelive Team
- 2020–2022: Multum Accountants–LSK Ladies

Fien Delbaere (born 21 April 1996) is a Belgian professional racing cyclist, who rode for UCI Women's Continental Team Multum Accountants Ladies.

== See also ==
- List of 2015 UCI Women's Teams and riders
