= Bryony van Velzen =

Dutch cyclist (born 1996)

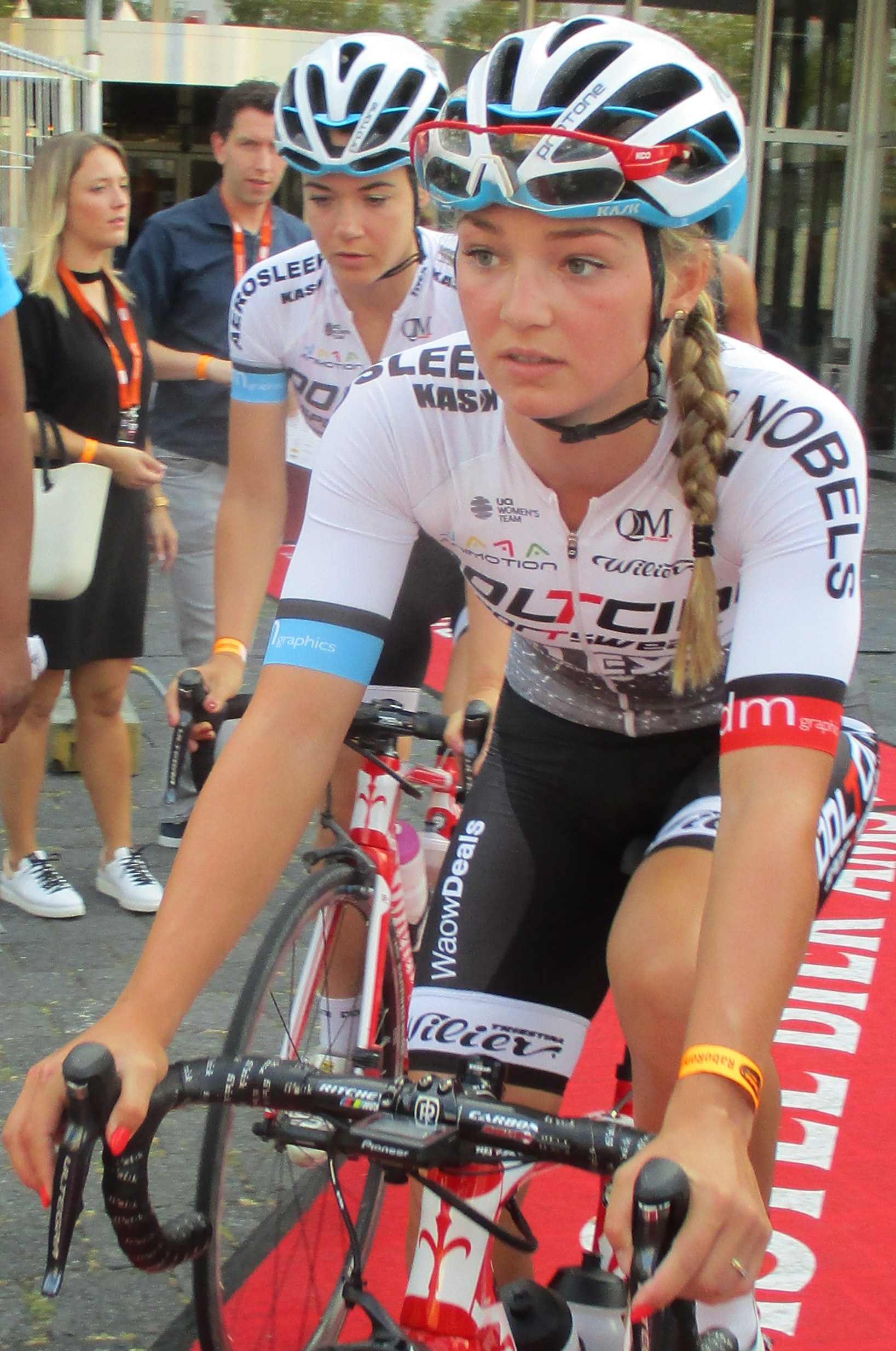
- Van Velzen in 2018

Personal information
- Full name: Bryony van Velzen
- Born: 14 May 1996 (age 30)

Cycling career
- Sport: Cycling
- Current team: Doltcini–Van Eyck–Proximus
- Discipline: Road
- Role: Rider

Amateur teams
- 2016: Lares–Waowdeals (stagiaire)
- 2020: Team Loving Potatoes

Professional teams
- 2017–2019: Lares–Waowdeals
- 2020: Ciclotel
- 2021: Doltcini–Van Eyck–Proximus

Bryony van Velzen (born 14 May 1996) is a former Dutch professional racing cyclist, who rode four years for UCI Women's Continental Team Doltcini–Van Eyck–Proximus and one year for Ciclotel.

== See also ==
- List of 2016 UCI Women's Teams and riders
