= Kylie Waterreus =

Dutch cyclist

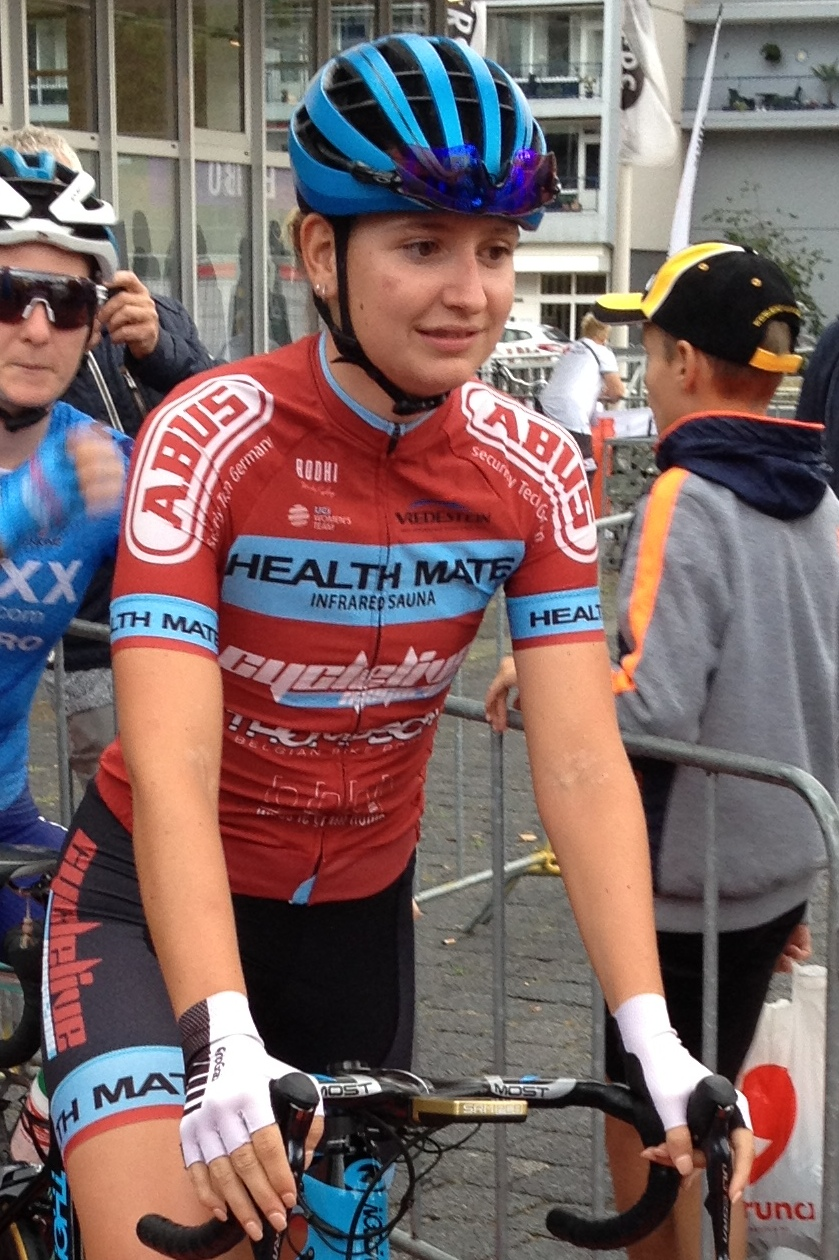
- Waterreus in 2019

Personal information
- Full name: Kylie Waterreus
- Born: 22 March 1998 (age 28)

Cycling career
- Sport: Cycling
- Discipline: Road
- Role: Rider

Professional teams
- 2019: Health Mate–Cyclelive Team
- 2020–2021: Multum Accountants–LSK Ladies

Kylie Waterreus (born 22 March 1998) is a Dutch professional racing cyclist, who rode for UCI Women's Continental Team Multum Accountants Ladies. She is the niece of former football goalkeeper Ronald Waterreus.
