= Multum Accountants Ladies Cycling Team =

Belgian cycling team

Team information
- UCI code: WET (2012–2018); MUL (2019–)
- Registered: Belgium
- Founded: 2012
- Status: National (2012–2019); UCI Women's Continental Team (2020–)

Team name history
- 2012 2013–2014 2015–2018 2019 2020 2021–: Wetterse Dakwerken–Autoglas Wetteren Cycling Team; Autoglas Wetteren–Group Solar Cycling Team; Autoglas Wetteren Cycling Team; Multum Accountants Ladies Cyclingteam; Multum Accountants–LSK Ladies Cycling Team; Multum Accountants Ladies Cycling Team
Multum Accountants Ladies Cycling Team jersey
Jersey

Multum Accountants Ladies Cycling Team is a Belgian women's road bicycle racing team which participates in elite women's races. The team was established in 2012.

== Team roster ==
As of 2 February 2021.

Rider	Date of birth
Anna Badegruber (AUT)	14 January 1997 (age 29)
Eefje Brandt (BEL)	22 May 2002 (age 24)
Marijke de Smedt (BEL)	17 May 1971 (age 55)
Fien De Wispelaere (BEL)	4 March 2002 (age 24)
Lara Defour (BEL)	12 November 1997 (age 28)
Fien Delbaere (BEL)	21 April 1996 (age 30)
Ann-Sophie Duyck (BEL)	23 July 1987 (age 39)
Leontine Farazijn (BEL)	1 April 2002 (age 24)

Rider	Date of birth
Sara Maes (BEL)	23 January 2002 (age 24)
Megan Panton (GBR)	16 January 2001 (age 25)
Lily Schuitemaker (NED)	14 July 1999 (age 27)
Julie Stockman (BEL)	17 August 1999 (age 27)
Rosalie van der Wolf (NED)	11 March 2001 (age 25)
Céline van Houtum (NED)	12 March 1997 (age 29)
Kylie Waterreus (NED)	22 March 1998 (age 28)

== Major results ==
2014
Erondegemse Pijl (Erpe-Mere), Ann-Sophie Duyck
Stage 2 Trophée d'Or Féminin, Ann-Sophie Duyck

2022
De Pinte Road Race, Julie Stockman
Berchem Road Race, Jessy Druyts
Provincial Championship Antwerpen, Road Race, Jessy Druyts
GP Peter Boone, Julie Stockman

== National Champions ==
2014
Belgium Time Trial, Ann-Sophie Duyck

2015
Israel Time Trial, Paz Bash

2018
Argentina Time Trial, Estefania Pilz

2022
Israel U23 Time Trial, Nofar Maoz
Belgium U23 Road Race, Sara Maes
