= Doltcini–Van Eyck–Proximus =

Belgian cycling team

Team information
- UCI code: DVE
- Registered: Belgium
- Founded: 2016
- Discipline: Road
- Status: UCI Women's Team (2016–2019); UCI Women's Continental Team (2020–present)
- Bicycles: Eddy Merckx Cycles
- Website: Team home page

Key personnel
- Team manager: Marc Bracke

Team name history
- 2016–2017 2018–2020 2020–: Lares–Waowdeals; Doltcini–Van Eyck Sport UCI Women Cycling; Doltcini–Van Eyck–Proximus
Doltcini–Van Eyck–Proximus jersey
Jersey

Doltcini–Van Eyck–Proximus is a Belgian UCI Women's Continental Team formed in 2016, which competes in elite women's road bicycle racing events, such as the UCI Women's World Tour.

== Team roster ==
As of 5 February 2021.

Rider	Date of birth
Amber Aernouts (BEL)	25 October 2000 (age 25)
Minke Bakker (NED)	11 March 1997 (age 29)
Victoire Berteau (FRA)	16 August 2000 (age 26)
Mieke Docx (BEL)	8 June 1996 (age 30)
Olha Kulynych (UKR)	1 February 2000 (age 26)
Jade Lenaers (BEL)	30 November 2001 (age 24)
Kelly Markus (NED)	7 February 1993 (age 33)
Jenna Merrick (NZL)	25 February 2000 (age 26)
Lotte Popelier (BEL)	21 May 2001 (age 25)

Rider	Date of birth
Dina Scavone (BEL)	10 August 2001 (age 25)
Christina Schweinberger (AUT)	29 October 1996 (age 29)
Kathrin Schweinberger (AUT)	29 October 1996 (age 29)
Nicole Steigenga (NED)	27 January 1998 (age 28)
Fien van Eynde (BEL)	8 September 1998 (age 27)
Bryony van Velzen (NED)	14 May 1996 (age 30)
Marieke van Witzenburg-de Groot (NED)	29 October 1985 (age 40)
Kata Blanka Vas (HUN)	3 September 2001 (age 25)

== Major wins ==
2016
Mountains classification Tour de Feminin-O cenu Českého Švýcarska, Flávia Oliveira
2017
Zonnebeke – Cyclo-cross, Thalita de Jong
2018
Ooike (Ladies Cycling Trophy Oost-Vlaanderen), Sofie De Vuyst
Wortegem-Petegem (Ladies Cycling Trophy Oost-Vlaanderen), Lotte Van Hoek
Stage 3 Tour of Zhoushan Island, Kelly Druyts
Mountains classification Panorama Guizhou International Women's Road Cycling Race, Tetyana Ryabchenko

Stage 3, Kelly Druyts

Mol-Sluis, Kelly Druyts
Kontich, Demmy Druyts
Stage 5 Tour de Feminin-O cenu Českého Švýcarska, Sofie De Vuyst
2020
Stage 4 Dubai Tour, Nicole Steigenga
2021
Gullegem Cyclo-cross, Blanka Vas
Antwerpen Provincial Time Trial Championship, Amber Aernouts
Landen Road Race, Fien Van Eynde

== National champions ==
2017
Portugal Track (Individual Pursuit), Daniela Reis
Portugal Track (Points race), Daniela Reis

2018
Portugal Time Trial, Daniela Reis
Portugal Road Race, Daniela Reis
France Track (Points Race), Pascale Jeuland

2019
France Time Trial, Séverine Eraud
Portugal Time Trial, Daniela Reis

2020
Hungary Cyclo-cross, Kata Blanka Vas
Hungary Road Race, Kata Blanka Vas
Austria Road Race, Kathrin Schweinberger
Cyprus Road Race, Antri Christoforou
Cyprus Time Trial, Antri Christoforou
Austria Track (Omnium), Kathrin Schweinberger

2021
Hungary Cyclo-cross, Kata Blanka Vas
Austria Road Race, Kathrin Schweinberger

== Development team ==
Doltcini–Corlyp–Waasland Security Development Team
Team information
- Registered: Belgium
- Founded: 2017
- Discipline: Road
- Status: National team
- Bicycles: Eddy Merckx Cycles
- Website: Team home page

Key personnel
- Team manager: Marc Bracke

Team name history
- 2017; 2018; 2019; 2020; 2021–: Lares Alarm Systems–WaowDeals Development Team; Doltcini–Van Assche Development Team; Doltcini–NM Transport Development Team; Doltcini–Corlyp Development Team; Doltcini–Corlyp–Waasland Security Development Team

Doltcini–Van Eyck–Proximus also operates a developmental team which serves as a training base and foundation for younger riders aiming to make it into the professional ranks.

=== Team roster ===
As of 5 February 2021.

Rider	Date of birth
Lotte Claes (BEL)	1 January 1993 (age 33)
Malaika Feys (BEL)	12 August 2004 (age 22)
Chloé Greenwood (BEL)	4 March 2004 (age 22)
Julie Hendrickx (BEL)	8 August 2003 (age 23)
Febe Jooris (BEL)	4 October 2004 (age 21)
Stéphanie Kemps (BEL)	2 May 2002 (age 24)

Rider	Date of birth
Fien Masure (BEL)	3 July 2003 (age 23)
Barbara Śnieżyńska (POL)	21 November 1993 (age 32)
Anna Vanderaerden (BEL)	10 November 2005 (age 20)
Lani Wittevrongel (BEL)	12 July 2004 (age 22)
Tessa Zwaenepoel (BEL)	27 September 2001 (age 24)

=== Major wins ===
2017
Montenaken Chrono, Febe Schokkaert
Provincial Time Trial Championship Oost-Vlaanderen, Febe Schokkaert
Provincial Time Trial Championship West-Vlaanderen, Shari Bossuyt
Provincial Junior Road Race Championship Vlaams-Brabant, Ditte Lenseclaes

=== National champions ===
2017
Belgium Junior Track (Omnium), Shari Bossuyt
Belgium Junior Time Trial, Shari Bossuyt
