= Anna Badegruber =

Austrian cyclist

Personal information
- Full name: Anna Badegruber
- Born: 14 January 1997 (age 29) Innerschwand am Mondsee, Austria

Cycling career
- Sport: Cycling
- Discipline: Road
- Role: Rider
- Rider type: All-rounder

Professional teams
- 2016: Vitalogic Astrokalb Radunion NÖ
- 2017–2019: Team WNT
- 2020–2021: Multum Accountants–LSK Ladies

Anna Badegruber (born 14 January 1997) is an Austrian professional racing cyclist, who rode for UCI Women's Continental Team Multum Accountants Ladies.

== See also ==
- List of 2016 UCI Women's Teams and riders
