= Jessica Finney =

British cyclist

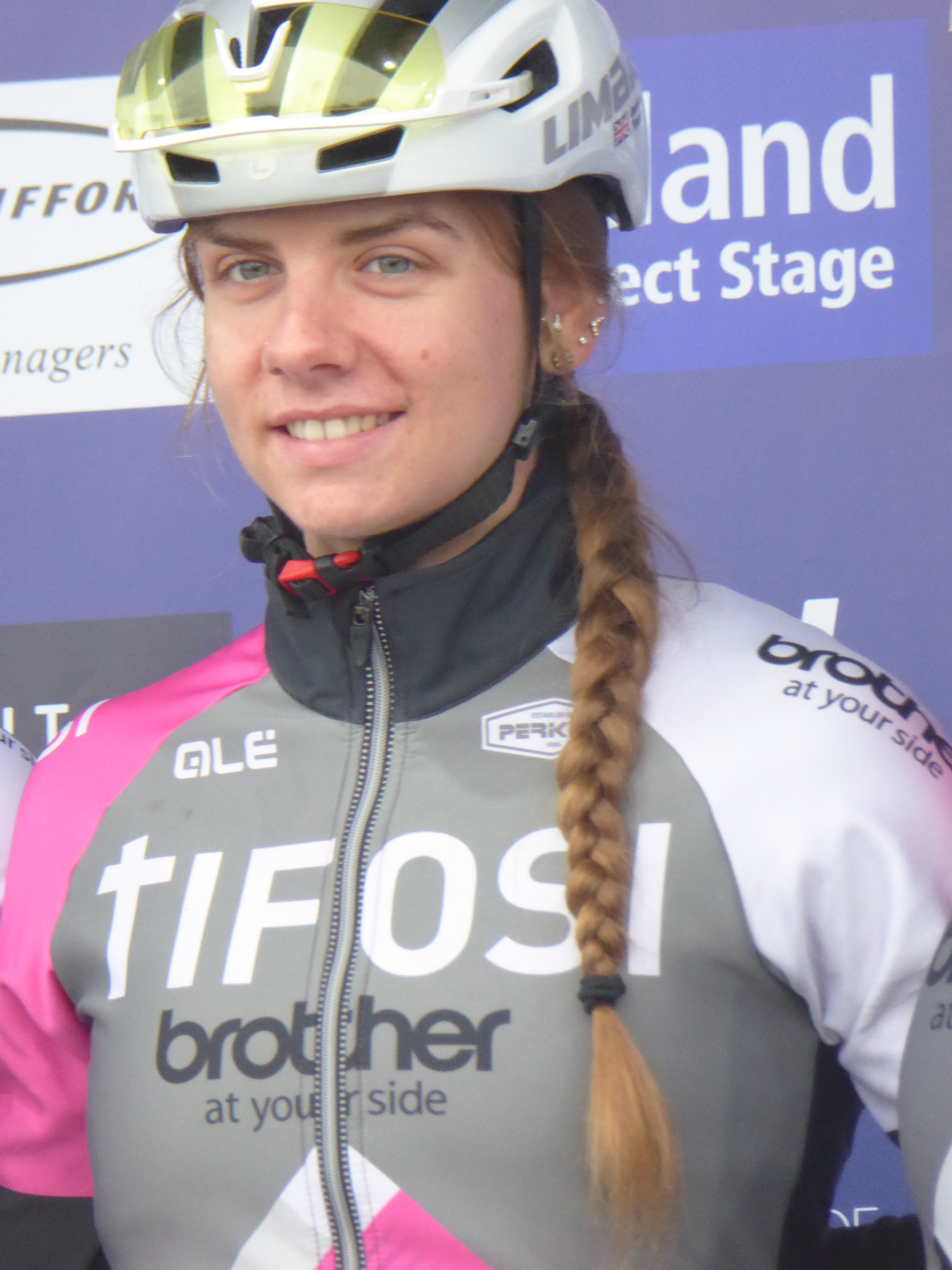
- Finney at the 2019 Women's Tour of Scotland

Personal information
- Born: 7 December 1995 (age 30)

Cycling career
- Sport: Cycling
- Current team: Portsmouth North End CC
- Discipline: Road
- Role: Rider

Amateur teams
- 2016: University of Portsmouth CC
- 2017: Portsmouth North End CC
- 2018–2019: Team OnForm
- 2025–: Portsmouth North End CC

Professional teams
- 2020–2022: CAMS–Tifosi
- 2023–2024: AWOL O'Shea

Jessica Finney (born 7 December 1995) is a British racing cyclist, who rides for British amateur team Portsmouth North End CC. She has previously competed for UCI Women's Continental Teams CAMS–Basso and Doltcini O'Shea.
