= Clover Murray =

British cyclist

Personal information
- Full name: Clover May Murray
- Born: 6 October 1997 (age 29)

Cycling career
- Sport: Cycling
- Current team: DAS–Hutchinson
- Discipline: Road
- Role: Rider

Amateur teams
- 2013–2014: Braintree Velo Cycle Racing Club
- 2015: Team Corley Cycles
- 2016: Team Ford EcoBoost
- 2017: Team OnForm
- 2018–2019: Admiral–Liv–AWOL

Professional team
- 2020–: CAMS–Tifosi

Clover May Murray (born 6 October 1997) is a British professional racing cyclist, who currently rides for UCI Women's Continental Team DAS–Hutchinson.
