= Elynor Bäckstedt =

British cyclist

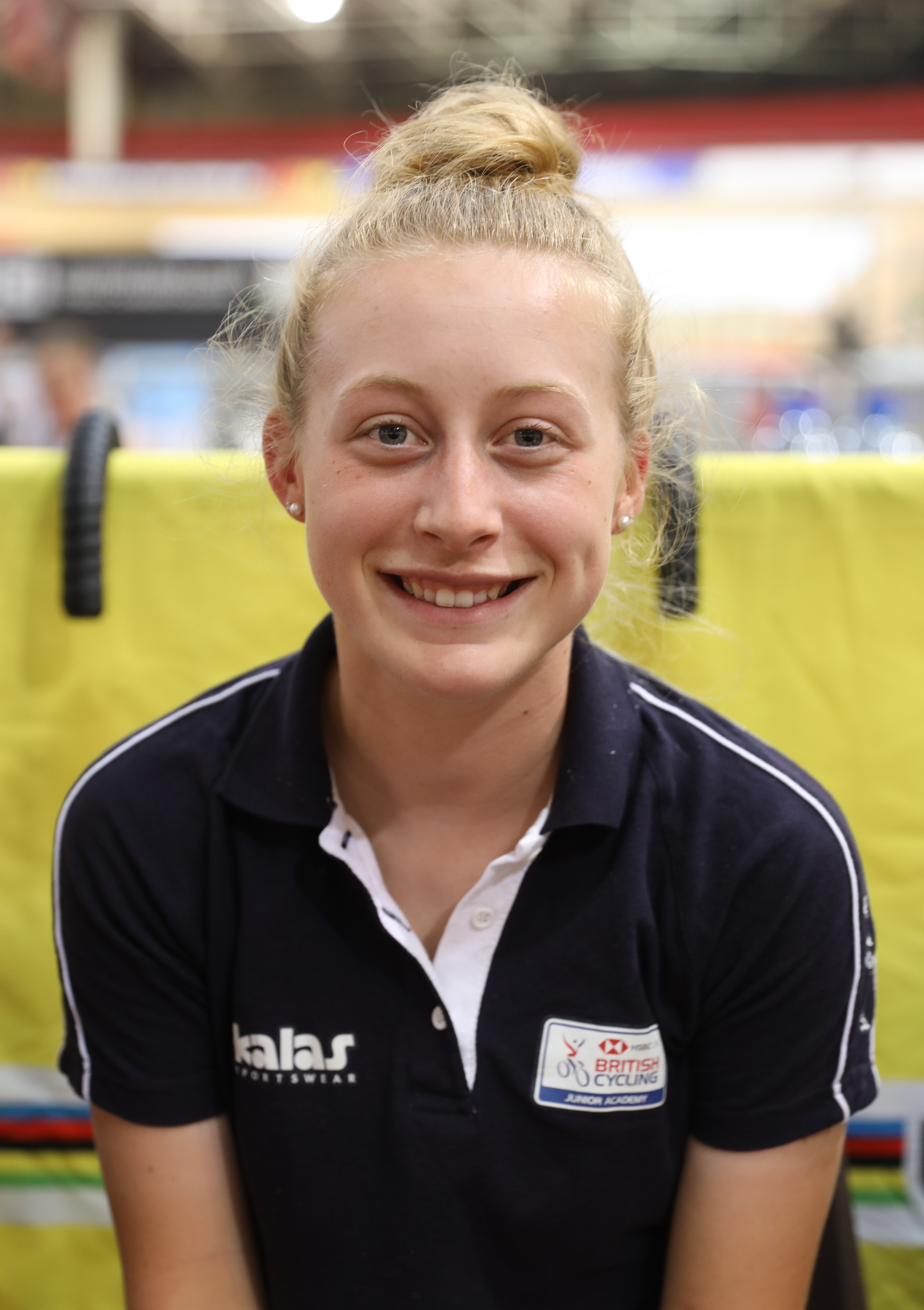
- Bäckstedt in 2019

Personal information
- Full name: Elynor Megan Bäckstedt-Calvert
- Born: 6 December 2001 (age 24) Pontypridd, Wales

Cycling career
- Sport: Cycling
- Current team: UAE Team L'Imad
- Disciplines: Road; Track
- Role: Rider

Amateur team
- 2019: Storey Racing

Professional teams
- 2020–2024: Trek–Segafredo
- 2025-: UAE Team ADQ
Medal record
Women's road cycling
Representing Great Britain
World Championships
| Bronze medal – third place | 2018 Innsbruck | Junior time trial |
| Bronze medal – third place | 2019 Yorkshire | Junior time trial |
Women's track cycling
World Junior Championships
| Silver medal – second place | 2019 Frankfurt (Oder) | Pursuit |
| Silver medal – second place | 2019 Frankfurt (Oder) | Madison |
| Bronze medal – third place | 2018 Aigle | Team Pursuit |
| Bronze medal – third place | 2019 Frankfurt (Oder) | Team Pursuit |

Elynor Megan Bäckstedt-Calvert (born 6 December 2001) is a Welsh professional racing cyclist, who currently rides for UCI Women's WorldTeam UAE Team L'Imad. At the 2019 UCI Road World Championships in Yorkshire, England, she won the bronze medal in the women's junior time trial event, repeating her achievement from the previous World Championships.

== Biography ==
Born in Pontypridd, Bäckstedt trains in the Pontyclun and Cardiff area. Her parents Magnus Bäckstedt and Megan Hughes were both professional cyclists, and she is the elder sister of Zoë Bäckstedt. In June 2026, she finished third at the British National Time Trial Championships; the race was won by her sister Zoe.

== Major results ==
2018
2nd Road race, National Junior Road Championships
3rd Time trial, UCI Junior Road World Championships
2019
UEC European Junior Track Championships

1st Individual pursuit
1st Madison (with Sophie Lewis)
2nd Team pursuit

1st Overall EPZ Omloop van Borsele Juniors

1st Points classification
1st Stages 1 (ITT) & 2

1st Gent–Wevelgem Junioren
UCI Junior Track World Championships

2nd Individual pursuit
2nd Madison (with Sophie Lewis)
3rd Team pursuit

2nd Overall Healthy Ageing Tour Juniors
2nd Road race, National Junior Road Championships
UCI Junior Road World Championships

3rd Time trial
5th Road race

2022
2nd Time trial, National Under-23 Road Championships
5th Road race, National Road Championships
2023
5th Time trial, National Road Championships
2024
5th Time trial, National Road Championships

== Personal life ==
On 23 July 2021, Bäckstedt announced her engagement to Charley Calvert, a fellow British professional cyclist.
