= Storey Racing =

Road bicycle racing women's team

Team information
- UCI code: STR
- Registered: United Kingdom
- Founded: 2017
- Disciplines: Road, Track, Cyclo-cross, MTB
- Status: National (2017); UCI Women's Team (2018); National (2019–)
- Bicycles: Boardman
- Website: Team home page

Key personnel
- General manager: Sarah Storey; Barney Storey
- Team managers: Barney Storey; Paul Freeman

Team name history
- 2017 2018 2019 2020–: Storey Racing; Storey–Le Col; Storey–Lamb & Watt; Storey Racing

Storey Racing is a professional road bicycle racing women's team, founded in 2017, which participates in elite women's races.

== Major results ==
2017
Derby Cyclo-cross, Bethany Crumpton
Abergavenny Cyclo-cross, Bethany Crumpton
UCI Track World Cup – Manchester (Team Pursuit), Neah Evans

2018
Ipswich Cyclo-cross, Bethany Crumpton
Overall British National Cyclo-cross Trophy, Bethany Crumpton
Lincoln Grand Prix, Rebecca Durrell
Melton Mowbray–Cicle Classic, Neah Evans
Derby Cyclo-cross, Bethany Crumpton
Irvine Cyclo-cross, Ffion James
Ardingly Cyclo-cross, Anna Kay
UCI Track World Cup – Germany (Team Pursuit), Emily Nelson
UCI Track World Cup – Germany (Madison), Emily Nelson
Ipswich Cyclo-cross II, Bethany Crumpton
UCI Track World Cup – London (Team Pursuit), Neah Evans

2019
Overall British National Cyclo-cross Trophy, Zoe Backstedt
Gent–Wevelgem Juniors, Elynor Backstedt
Overall Omloop van Borsele Juniors, Elynor Backstedt

Stages 1 & 2, Elynor Backstedt

Koppenberg Cyclo-cross, Zoe Backstedt
Mollecross Cyclo-cross, Zoe Backstedt
Zonhoven Cyclo-cross, Zoe Backstedt
Waaslandcross Sint-Niklaas, Zoe Backstedt
Balegem Cyclo-cross, Zoe Backstedt
Bredene Cyclo-cross, Zoe Backstedt

== Continental Championships ==
2018
World Track (Madison), Emily Nelson
European Track (Team pursuit), Neah Evans

2019
Great Britain Cyclo-cross (Debutants), Zoe Backstedt
Ireland Time Trial, Kelly Murphy
European Junior Track (Team pursuit), Elynor Backstedt
European Junior Track (Madison), Elynor Backstedt

== Team roster ==
Rider	Date of birth
Bethany Crumpton (GBR)	10 June 1994 (age 32)
Monica Dew (GBR)	14 January 1998 (age 28)
Hannah Dines (GBR)	14 April 1993 (age 33)
Rebecca Durrell (GBR)	25 August 1988 (age 38)
Neah Evans (GBR)	1 August 1990 (age 36)
Elizabeth-Jane Harris (GBR)	7 January 1988 (age 38)
Ffion James (GBR)	21 December 1997 (age 28)

Rider	Date of birth
Anna Kay (GBR)	6 May 1999 (age 27)
Joscelin Lowden (GBR)	3 October 1987 (age 38)
Melissa Lowther (GBR)	15 May 1996 (age 30)
Chanel Mason (GBR)	1 May 1996 (age 30)
Emily Nelson (GBR)	10 November 1996 (age 29)
Sarah Storey (GBR)	26 October 1977 (age 48)
