= Leah Dixon =

British cyclist

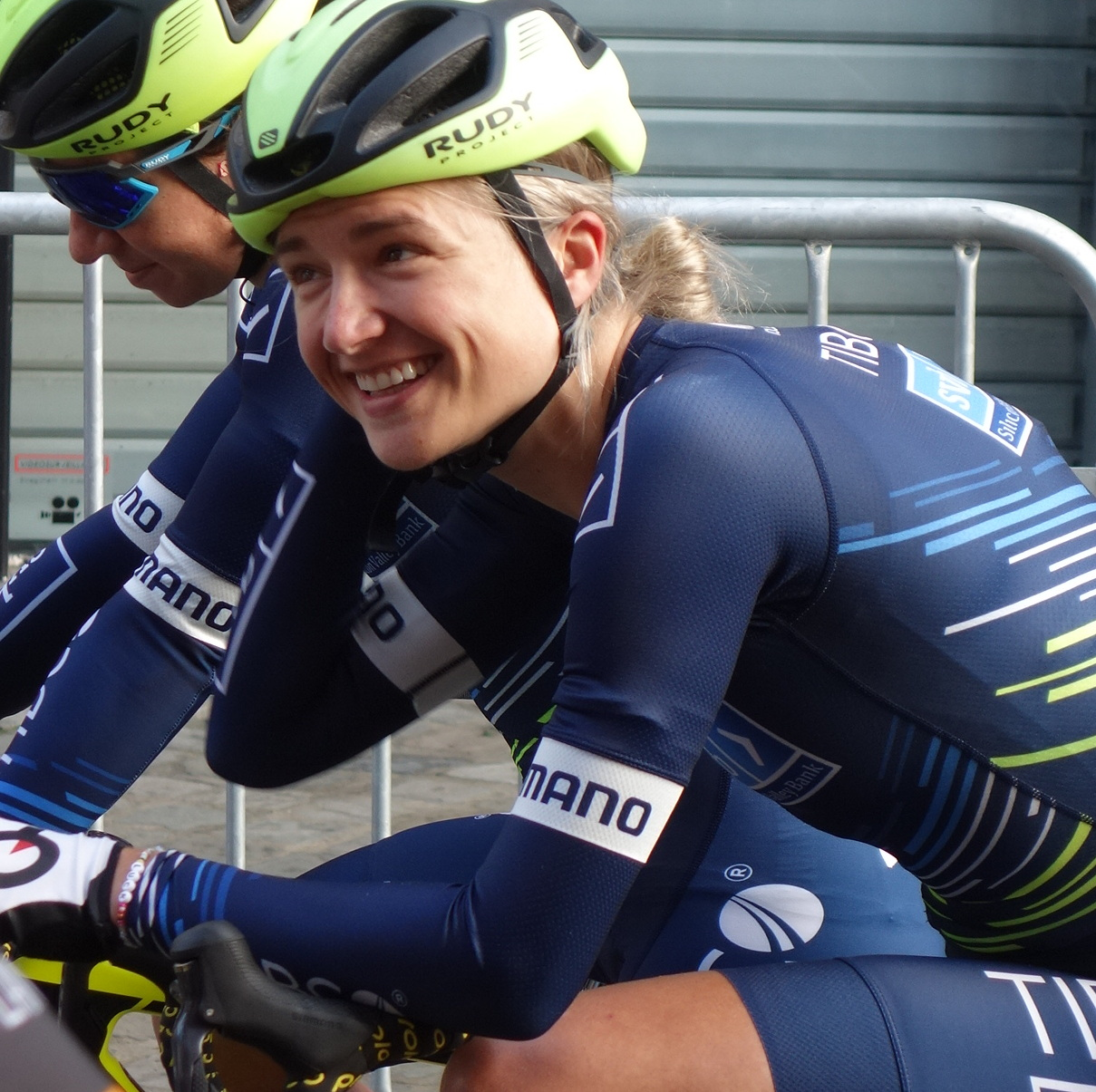
- Dixon at the 2020 La Flèche Wallonne Femmes

Personal information
- Full name: Leah Danielle Dixon
- Born: 26 August 1991 (age 35) Aberdare, Wales

Cycling career
- Sport: Cycling
- Discipline: Road
- Role: Rider

Amateur teams
- 2017: Wolverhampton Wheelers
- 2017: Jadan–Weldtite p/b Vive Le Velo
- 2018–2019: Team OnForm
- 2022: Bianchi Hunt Morvélo

Professional team
- 2019–2021: Tibco–Silicon Valley Bank

Leah Danielle Dixon (born 26 August 1991) is a British racing cyclist from Wales, who competed for UCI Women's Continental Team Tibco–Silicon Valley Bank between 2019 and 2021. She twice finished on the podium at the British National Time Trial Championships – third in 2021 and second in 2022.
