= Proximus–Cyclis =

Italian cycling team

Team information
- Registered: Belgium
- Founded: 2021
- Discipline: Road
- Status: National (2021–2022); UCI Women's Continental Team (2023–)

Team name history
- 2021–2023 2024–: Proximus–Alphamotorhomes–Doltcini; Proximus–Cyclis
Proximus–Cyclis jersey
Jersey

Proximus–Cyclis is a Belgian women's road cycling team that was founded in 2021, registering as a professional team in 2023.

== Major results ==
2023
Ronde van Heeswijk, Celine Van Houtum
Oudenaarde, Margarita Lopez
Ronde van De Lier. Melissa Hofman
