= DAS–Hutchinson =

British cycling team

DAS– Hutchinson
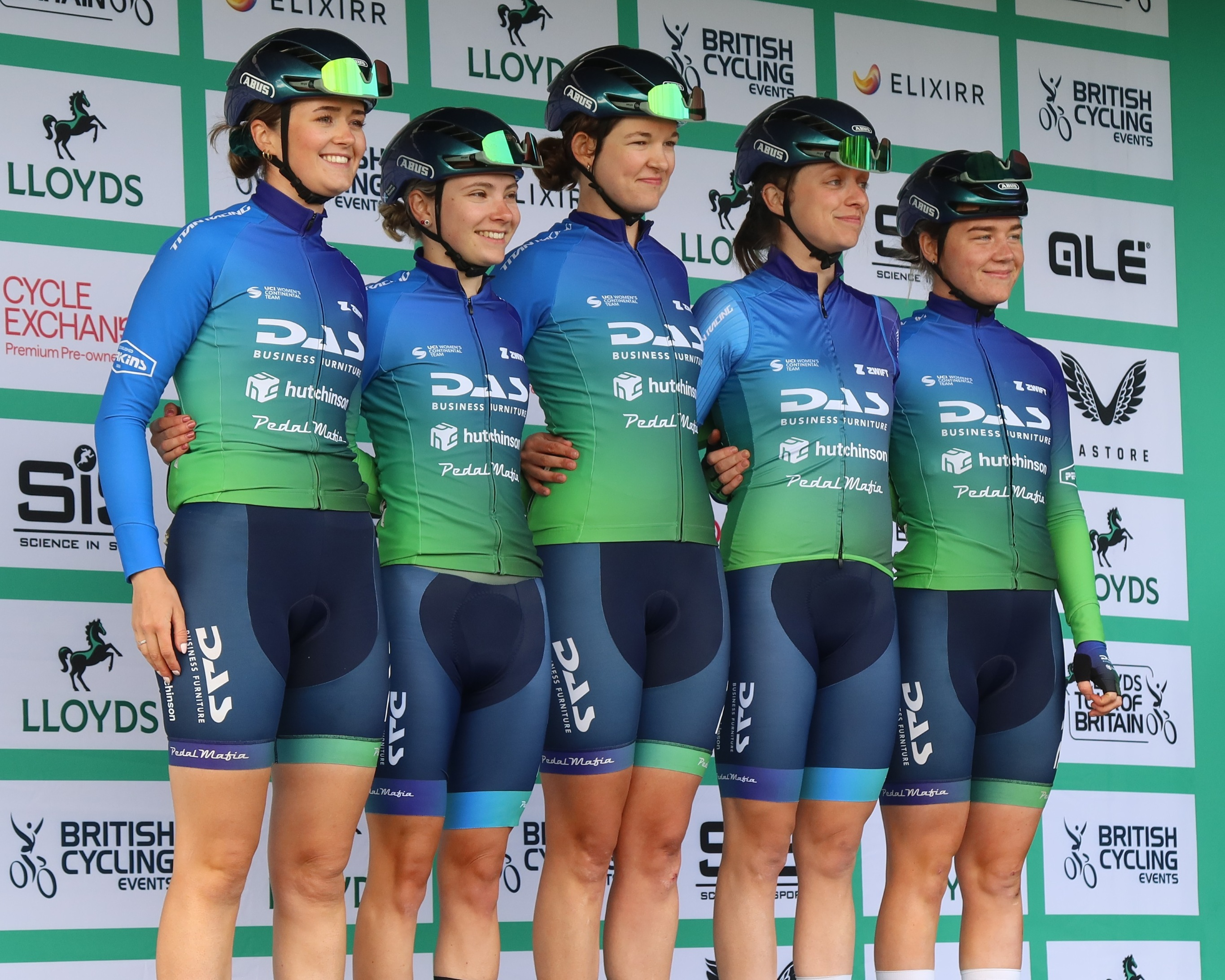
- At the 2025 Tour of Britain Women

Team information
- UCI code: ONF (2017–2018); BRO (2019); CAT (2020–present)
- Registered: United Kingdom
- Founded: 2017
- Discipline: road cycling
- Status: National (2017–2019); UCI Women's Continental Team (2020–present)
- Bicycles: Basso Bikes

Team name history
- 2017–2018 2019 2020–2021 2021–2022 2023 2024 2025: Team Onform; Brother UK–Tifosi p/b OnForm; CAMS–Tifosi; CAMS–Basso Bikes; DAS–Handsling; DAS–Hutchinson–Brother–UK; DAS– Hutchinson

DAS– Hutchinson is a British women's road bicycle racing team, which since 2020, has been registered as a UCI Women's Continental Team. The team was established in 2017. The team has taken part in every edition of the Tour of Britain Women since 2021.

== Team roster ==
As of 19 January 2021.

Rider	Date of birth
Megan Barker (GBR)	15 August 1997 (age 29)
Rebecca Durrell (GBR)	25 August 1988 (age 38)
Emma Edwards (USA)	24 August 1990 (age 36)
Jessica Finney (GBR)	7 December 1995 (age 30)
Illi Gardner (GBR)	14 October 1999 (age 26)
Natalie Grinczer (GBR)	15 November 1993 (age 32)
Clover Murray (GBR)	6 October 1997 (age 28)

Rider	Date of birth
Jennifer Powell (GBR)	29 September 1987 (age 38)
Katie Scott (GBR)	20 April 2001 (age 25)
Gabriella Shaw (GBR)	22 June 1992 (age 34)
Hayley Simmonds (GBR)	22 July 1988 (age 38)
Jo Tindley (GBR)	1 May 1987 (age 39)
Kate Wootton (GBR)	6 October 2001 (age 24)

== Major results ==
2019
East-Cleveland Klondike Grand Prix, Anna Henderson
Lincoln Grand Prix, Rebecca Durrell
Overall Tour of the Reservoir, Leah Dixon

Stage 1, Rebecca Durrell
Stage 2, Leah Dixon

Stockton Cycling Festival Grand Prix, Rebecca Durrell
UCI Track World Cup – Glasgow, Team Pursuit, Neah Evans

== Continental & national champions ==
2019
British Criterium, Rebecca Durrell
European Track (Team Pursuit), Neah Evans

2022
British Track (Scratch race), Ella Barnwell
British Track (Omnium), Sophie Lewis
