= Health Mate–Cyclelive Team =

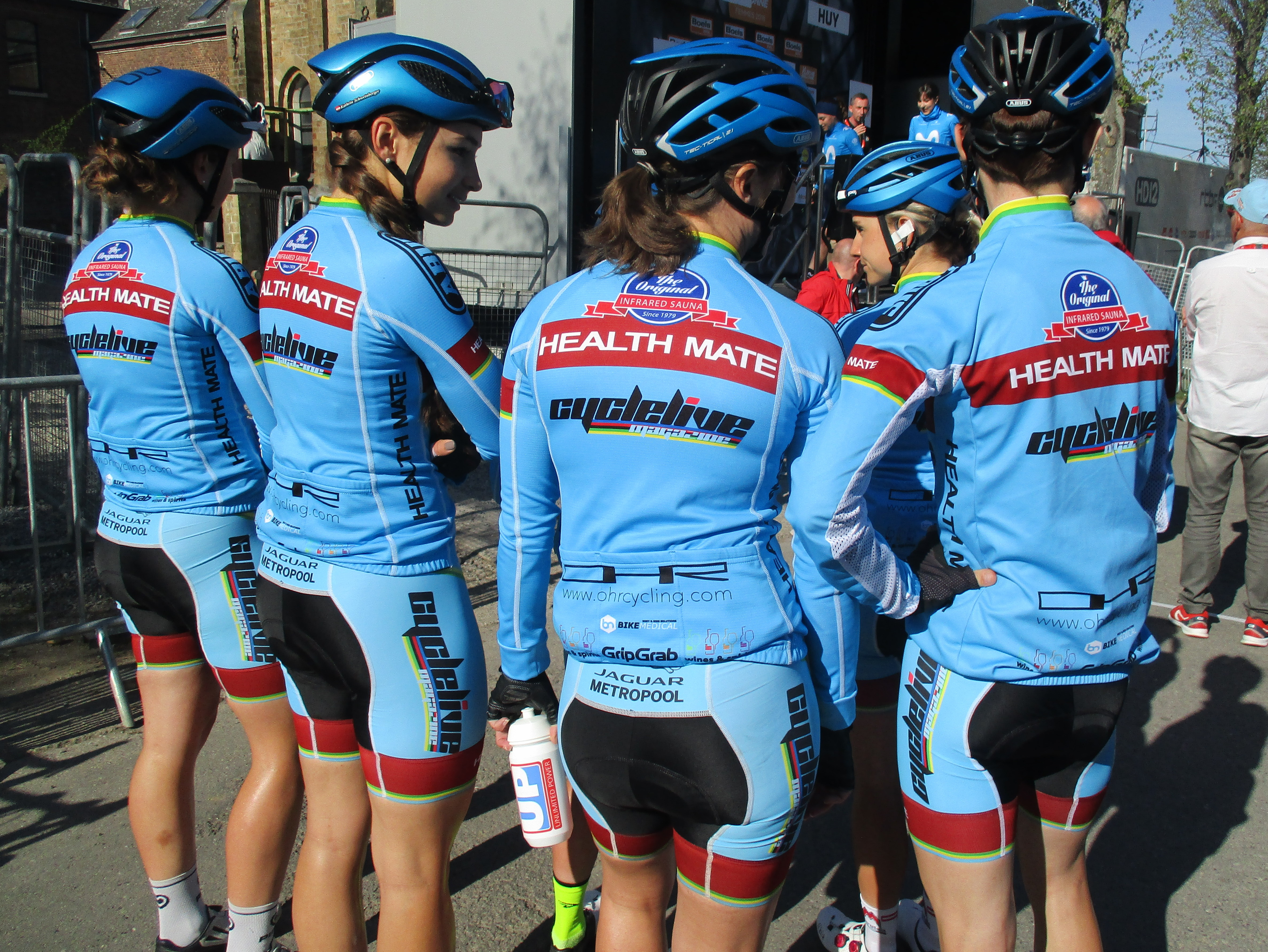

Team information
- UCI code: HCT
- Registered: Belgium
- Founded: 2018
- Disbanded: 2019
- Discipline: Road
- Status: UCI Women's Team
- Bicycles: Thompson

Key personnel
- General manager: Patrick Van Gansen

Team name history
- 2018–2019: Health Mate–Cyclelive Team
Health Mate–Cyclelive Team jersey
Jersey

Health Mate–Cyclelive Team was a professional road bicycle racing women's team which participates in elite women's races.

== Team roster ==
As of 8 July 2019.

Rider	Date of birth
Lara Defour (BEL)	12 November 1997 (age 28)
Fien Delbaere (BEL)	21 April 1996 (age 30)
Veronika Kormos (HUN)	17 August 1992 (age 34)
Elodie Kuijper (NED)	2 March 2000 (age 26)
Marga López (ESP)	3 December 1997 (age 28)
Laura Camila Lozano Ramírez (COL)	25 October 1986 (age 39)
Christina Perchtold (AUT)	11 May 1993 (age 33)
Lotte Rotman (BEL)	19 June 1999 (age 27)

Rider	Date of birth
Christina Schweinberger (AUT)	29 October 1996 (age 29)
Kathrin Schweinberger (AUT)	29 October 1996 (age 29)
Laura Süßemilch (GER)	23 February 1997 (age 29)
Zsófia Szabó (HUN)	3 January 1997 (age 29)
Kirstie van Haaften (NED)	21 January 1999 (age 27)
Suzanne Verhoeven (BEL)	8 May 1996 (age 30)
Kylie Waterreus (NED)	22 March 1998 (age 28)

== Major results ==
2018
Stage 2 Tour of Uppsala, Kathrin Schweinberger
Diamond Tour, Janine van der Meer
