= UCI Women's Team =

Women's road bicycle team

A UCI Women's Team is a women's road bicycle team sanctioned by the International Cycling Union (UCI). These teams compete in the major women's bicycle races, including the UCI Women's World Tour. The country designation of each team is determined by the country of registration of most of its riders and is not necessarily the country where the team is registered or based.

== WorldTeams ==
UCI Women's WorldTeams are automatically invited to compete in UCI Women's World Tour events. From 2026, WorldTeams are required to compete in the majority of World Tour races, with an obligation to compete in all three Grand Tours (La Vuelta Femenina, Giro d'Italia Women, and Tour de France Femmes).

As of 2026, the fourteen UCI Women's WorldTeams are:

Code	Team (current name)	Year joined	Registered in
AGS	AG Insurance–Soudal	2024	Belgium
CSZ	Canyon//SRAM	2020	Germany
EFO	EF Education–Oatly	2026	United States
TFS	FDJ United–Suez	2020	France
FPT	Fenix–Premier Tech	2023	Belgium
HPH	Human Powered Health	2022	United States
LTK	Lidl–Trek	2020	United States
LIV	Liv AlUla Jayco	2020	Australia
MOV	Movistar Team	2020	Spain
TPP	Team Picnic–PostNL	2020	Netherlands
SDW	Team SD Worx–Protime	2021	Netherlands
TVL	Visma–Lease a Bike	2022	Netherlands
UAD	UAE Team L'Imad	2020	UAE
UXM	Uno-X Mobility	2022	Norway

=== Former WorldTeams ===
Code	Team	Years active	Registered in
TIB	EF Education–Tibco–SVB	2022–2023	United States
LIV	Liv Racing TeqFind	2020–2023	Netherlands
CGS	Roland Le Dévoluy	2022–2025	Switzerland
CTC	Ceratizit Pro Cycling	2024–2025	Germany

== ProTeams ==
UCI Women's ProTeams were introduced for the 2025 season, creating a structure similar to that of the men's teams.

Code	Team (current name)	Year joined	Registered in
CWT	Cofidis	2025	France
LKF	Laboral Kutxa–Fundación Euskadi	2025	Spain
LIL	Lotto–Intermarché Ladies	2026	Belgium
MPE	Ma Petite Entreprise	2026	France
WOS	Mayenne Monbana My Pie	2025	France
AUB	St. Michel–Preference Home–Auber93	2025	France
VWT	VolkerWessels Women Cyclingteam	2025	Netherlands

== Continental teams ==
As of July 2026, there are 39 continental teams.

Code	Team name	Country
SAB	7 Saber Uzbekistan Cycling Team	Uzbekistan
AGI	AG Insurance Soudal Devo Team	Belgium
AGN	Ag Insurance - Nxtg U23 Team	Belgium
AGS	AG Insurance–Soudal	Belgium
ARA	ARA Skip Capital	Australia
ARK	Arkéa–B&B Hotels Women	France
VAI	Aromitalia 3T Vaiano	Italy
AWO	Doltcini O'Shea	United Kingdom
BPK	Bepink–Bongioanni	Italy
BDW	Bodywrap LTWOO	China
BTW	BTC City Ljubljana Zhiraf Ambedo	Italy
CDR	Cantabria Deporte–Río Miera	Spain
CSG	Canyon–SRAM Generation	Germany
WNT	Ceratizit–WNT Pro Cycling	Germany
GPC	China Liv Pro Cycling	China
CMS	Clarus Merquimia Group–Strongman	Colombia
COF	Cofidis	France
CPD	Colombia Pacto Por El Deporte–GW–Shimano	Colombia
CYN	Hangar 15 Bicycles	United States
DAS	DAS–Hutchinson–Brother–UK	United Kingdom
DCH	Chevalmeire	Belgium
EIC	Eneicat–CMTeam	Spain
FBW	Team Farto–BTC Women's Cycling Team	Spain
FDD	Fenix-Deceuninck Development Team	Belgium
GBJ	A.S.D. K2 Women Team	Italy
GKR	GT Krush Rebellease	Netherlands
HEC	Hebei Women Continental Team	China
HCT	Health Mate–Cyclelive Team	Luxembourg
ILP	Platform Pro Cycling	Canada
SBT	Isolmant–Premac–Vittoria	Italy
COG	Israël Premier Tech - Roland Development	Switzerland
LKF	Laboral Kutxa–Fundación Euskadi	Spain
LNL	Li Ning Star Ladies	China
LDL	Lotto–Dstny Ladies	Belgium
MAW	MAT Atom Deweloper Wrocław	Poland
MXR	Maxx-Solar Rose Women Racing	Germany
PHV	VolkerWessels Women Cyclingteam	Netherlands
PVR	Primeau Velo Racing Team	Canada
PRO	Proximus-Cyclis CT	Belgium
ROX	Boneshaker Project presented by ROXO	United States
FLR	Smurfit Westrock Cycling Team	United Kingdom
STC	Soltec Iberoamérica	Panama
AUB	St. Michel–Mavic–Auber93	France
TCW	Tashkent City Women Professional Cycling Team	Uzbekistan
TBL	Team BridgeLane	Australia
HPU	Team Coop–Repsol	Norway
TDP	Team Dukla Praha	Czechia
GEK	Team Komugi–Grand Est	France
TGA	Team dsm–firmenich PostNL	France
MDS	Team Mendelspeck Ge-Man	Italy
TWC	Thailand Women's Cycling Team	Thailand
TOP	Top Girls Fassa Bortolo	Italy
TOR	Torelli	Ireland
T24	Virginia's Blue Ridge–Twenty24	United States
UDT	UAE Team ADQ	UAE
WCC	WCC Team	Switzerland
SRC	Winspace	France
XCW	XDS China Women Team	China

== Former UCI Women's teams ==
Code	Team Name	Country	First year	Last year
HBH	Team Halfords Bikehut	United Kingdom	2008	2008
DPD	Team Ibis Cycles	United Kingdom	2012	2012
OND; VVP	Vrienden van het Platteland	Netherlands	2000	2008
SQS	Squadra Scappatella	Austria	2013	2013
DRP	Lifeplus Wahoo	United Kingdom	2015	2024
