= List of rosters for Corley Cycles–Drops RT and its successors =

This page lists the rosters, by season, of the UCI Women's Team, Trek–Drops.

== 2021 ==
Ages as of 1 January 2021

Rider	Date of birth
Lizzy Bennett (GBR)	18 August 1999 (age 26)
Anna Christian (GBR)	6 August 1995 (age 30)
Dani Christmas (GBR)	21 December 1987 (age 38)
Joscelin Lowden (GBR)	3 October 1987 (age 38)
Maria Martins (POR)	9 July 1999 (age 26)
Emily Meakin (GBR)	18 December 1988 (age 37)
Emilie Moberg (NOR)	12 July 1991 (age 34)

Rider	Date of birth
Elise Marie Olsen (NOR)	13 February 2001 (age 25)
Sara Penton (SWE)	15 November 1988 (age 37)
Finja Smekal (GER)	28 February 2001 (age 25)
April Tacey (GBR)	12 October 2000 (age 25)
Alice Towers (GBR)	12 October 2002 (age 23)
Maike van der Duin (NED)	12 September 2001 (age 24)
Marjolein van't Geloof (NED)	27 March 1996 (age 30)

== 2018 ==
Ages as of 1 January 2018.

Rider	Date of birth
Eva Buurman (NED)	September 7, 1994 (aged 23)
Anna Christian (GBR)	August 6, 1995 (aged 22)
Kathrin Hammes (GER)	January 9, 1989 (aged 28)
Lizzie Holden (GBR)	September 12, 1997 (aged 20)
Manon Lloyd (GBR)	November 5, 1996 (aged 21)
Annasley Park (GBR)	April 24, 1996 (aged 21)
Abby-Mae Parkinson (GBR)	July 30, 1997 (aged 20)

Rider	Date of birth
Hannah Payton (GBR)	March 23, 1994 (aged 23)
Lucy Shaw (GBR)	July 17, 1997 (aged 20)
Annie Simpson (GBR)	June 6, 1990 (aged 27)
Abi Van Twisk (GBR)	March 1, 1997 (aged 20)
Molly Weaver (GBR)	March 15, 1994 (aged 23)
Tayler Wiles (USA)	July 20, 1989 (aged 28)

== 2017 ==
Ages as of 1 January 2017.

Rider	Date of birth
Alice Barnes (GBR)	July 17, 1995 (aged 21)
Anna Christian (GBR)	August 6, 1995 (aged 21)
Sophie Coleman (GBR)	August 12, 1990 (aged 26)
Rebecca Durrell (GBR)	August 25, 1988 (aged 28)
Ann-Sophie Duyck (BEL)	July 23, 1987 (aged 29)
Lizzie Holden (GBR)	September 12, 1997 (aged 19)
Laura Massey (GBR)	September 1, 1981 (aged 35)
Rose Osborne (GBR)	February 19, 1990 (aged 26)
Annasley Park (GBR)	April 24, 1996 (aged 20)

Rider	Date of birth
Abby-Mae Parkinson (GBR)	July 30, 1997 (aged 19)
Hannah Payton (GBR)	March 23, 1994 (aged 22)
Martina Ritter (AUT)	September 23, 1982 (aged 34)
Lucy Shaw (GBR)	July 17, 1997 (aged 19)
Annie Simpson (GBR)	June 6, 1990 (aged 26)
Abi Van Twisk (GBR)	March 1, 1997 (aged 19)
Rebecca Womersley (GBR)	March 6, 1993 (aged 23)
Susanna Zorzi (ITA)	March 13, 1992 (aged 24)
