= List of 2016 UCI Women's Teams and riders =

Listed below are the UCI Women's Teams that competed in 2016 women's road cycling events organized by the International Cycling Union (UCI), including the 2016 UCI Women's World Tour.

== Teams overview ==
The country designation of each team is determined by the country of registration of the largest number of its riders, and is not necessarily the country where the team is registered or based.

List updated 12 March 2016 (

)

The 2016 UCI Women's Teams are:

Code	Official team name	Country	Continent	Website
ALE	Alé–Cipollini (2016 season)	Italy	EUR	site
VAI	Aromitalia Vaiano (2016 season)	Italy	EUR	site
ASA	Astana Women's Team (2016 season)	Kazakhstan	ASI	site
BPK	Bepink (2016 season)	Italy	EUR	site
BDP	Bizkaia–Durango (2016 season)	Spain	EUR	site
DLT	Boels–Dolmans (2016 season)	Netherlands	EUR	site
BTC	BTC City Ljubljana (2016 season)	Slovenia	EUR	site
LPR2	Canyon–SRAM (2016 season)	Germany	EUR	
CBT	Cervélo–Bigla Pro Cycling (2016 season)	Germany	EUR	site
GPC	China Chongming–Liv–Champion System Pro Cycling (2016 season)	Hong Kong	ASI	site
CVB	Colavita/Bianchi (2016 season)	United States	AME	site
CPC	Cylance Pro Cycling (2016 season)	United States	AME	site
DRP	Drops Cycling Team (2016 season)	United Kingdom	EUR	site
HBS	Hagens Berman–Supermint (2016 season)	United States	AME	site
HPU	Hitec Products (2016 season)	Norway	EUR	site
ISG	Inpa–Bianchi (2016 season)	Italy	EUR	site
LWW	Lares–Waowdeals (2016 season)	Belgium	EUR	site
LZE	Lensworld–Zannata (2016 season)	Belgium	EUR	site
LTK	Lointek (2016 season)	Spain	EUR	site
LBL	Lotto Soudal Ladies (2016 season)	Belgium	EUR	site
OGE	Orica–AIS (2016 season)	Australia	OCE	site
PHV	Parkhotel Valkenburg Continental Team (2016 season)	Netherlands	EUR	site
PAC	Podium Ambition Pro Cycling p/b Club La Santa (2016 season)	United Kingdom	EUR	site
FUT	Poitou–Charentes.Futuroscope.86 (2016 season)	France	EUR	site
RBW	Rabo–Liv Women Cycling Team (2016 season)	Netherlands	EUR	site
RLW	Rally Cycling (2016 season)	United States	AME	site
MIC	S.C. Michela Fanini Rox (2016 season)	Italy	EUR	site
SEF	Servetto Footon (2016 season)	Italy	EUR	site
BMS	Team BMS BIRN (2016 season)	Denmark	EUR	site
TLP	Team Liv–Plantur (2016 season)	Netherlands	EUR	site
TIB	Tibco–Silicon Valley Bank (2016 season)	United States	AME	site
TOG	Top Girls Fassa Bortolo (2016 season)	Italy	EUR	site
VLL	Topsport Vlaanderen–Etixx (2016 season)	Belgium	EUR	site
T16	Twenty16–Ridebiker (2016 season)	United States	AME	site
UHC	UnitedHealthcare Women's Team (2016 season)	United States	AME	site
DNA	Visit Dallas DNA Pro Cycling (2016 season)	United States	AME	site
NOE	Vitalogic Astrokalb Radunion Nö (2016 season)	Austria	EUR	site
SLP	Weber–Shimano Ladies Power (2016 season)	Argentina	AME	
WHT	Wiggle High5 Pro Cycling (2016 season)	United Kingdom	EUR	site
XSL	Xirayas de San Luis (2016 season)	Argentina	AME	

== Riders ==
=== Alé–Cipollini ===
As of 1 January 2016. Ages as of 1 January 2016.

Rider	Date of birth
Martina Alzini (ITA)	10 February 1997 (aged 18)
Marta Bastianelli (ITA)	30 April 1987 (aged 28)
Annalisa Cucinotta (ITA)	4 March 1986 (aged 29)
Emilia Fahlin (SWE)	24 October 1988 (aged 27)
Małgorzata Jasińska (POL)	18 January 1984 (aged 31)
Dalia Muccioli (ITA)	22 May 1993 (aged 22)

Rider	Date of birth
Beatrice Rossato (ITA)	6 November 1996 (aged 19)
Ane Santesteban Gonzalez (ESP)	12 December 1990 (aged 25)
Ellen Skerritt (AUS)	20 December 1994 (aged 21)
Marta Tagliaferro (ITA)	4 November 1989 (aged 26)
Anna Trevisi (ITA)	8 May 1992 (aged 23)

=== Aromitalia Vaiano ===
As of 1 January 2016. Ages as of 1 January 2016.

Rider	Date of birth
Monia Baccaille (ITA)	10 April 1984 (aged 31)
Beatrice Bartelloni (ITA)	5 February 1993 (aged 22)
Lisa De Ranieri (ITA)	30 July 1997 (aged 18)
Elena Franchi (ITA)	26 August 1996 (aged 19)
Sérika Guluma Ortiz (COL)	16 July 1990 (aged 25)
Lija Laizāne (LAT)	6 July 1993 (aged 22)

Rider	Date of birth
Silvija Latozaite (LTU)	20 November 1993 (aged 22)
Rasa Leleivytė (LTU)	22 July 1988 (aged 27)
Alessia Martini (ITA)	10 January 1992 (aged 23)
Nicole Nesti (ITA)	20 September 1997 (aged 18)
Jessica Parra (COL)	10 August 1995 (aged 20)
Alessia Bulleri (ITA)	19 July 1993 (aged 22)

=== Astana ===
As of 1 January 2016. Ages as of 1 January 2016.

Rider	Date of birth
Tatiana Antoshina (RUS)	27 July 1982 (aged 33)
Sofia Beggin (ITA)	12 October 1997 (aged 18)
Sofia Bertizzolo (ITA)	21 August 1997 (aged 18)
Kseniya Dobrynina (RUS)	11 January 1994 (aged 21)
Íngrid Drexel (MEX)	28 July 1993 (aged 22)
Arianna Fidanza (ITA)	6 January 1995 (aged 20)
Tatyana Geneleva (KAZ)	14 April 1997 (aged 18)
Viktoriya Pastarnak (KAZ)	31 August 1997 (aged 18)
Sara Pillon (ITA)	23 February 1997 (aged 18)

Rider	Date of birth
Faina Potapova (KAZ)	12 September 1996 (aged 19)
Fanny Riberot (FRA)	17 March 1983 (aged 32)
Carolina Rodriguez Gutierrez (MEX)	30 September 1993 (aged 22)
Natalya Saifutdinova (KAZ)	11 February 1989 (aged 26)
Natalya Sokovnina (KAZ)	18 January 1990 (aged 25)
Makhabbat Umutzhanova (KAZ)	11 August 1994 (aged 21)
Svetlana Vasilieva (RUS)	15 July 1995 (aged 20)
Nadezhda Geneleva (KAZ)	14 April 1997 (aged 18)
Yekaterina Yuraitis (KAZ)	8 August 1996 (aged 19)

=== Bepink ===
As of 1 January 2016. Ages as of 1 January 2016.

Rider	Date of birth
Lex Albrecht (CAN)	6 April 1987 (aged 28)
Elena Bissolati (ITA)	10 January 1997 (aged 18)
Simona Bortolotti (ITA)	6 December 1994 (aged 21)
Giorgia Fraiegari (ITA)	18 July 1995 (aged 20)
Tereza Medveďová (SVK)	27 March 1996 (aged 19)
Giulia Nanni (ITA)	14 April 1997 (aged 18)
Amber Neben (USA)	18 February 1975 (aged 40)
Lenore Pipes (GUM)	1 November 1985 (aged 30)

Rider	Date of birth
Ilaria Sanguineti (ITA)	15 April 1994 (aged 21)
Tatiana Shamanova (RUS)	18 January 1992 (aged 23)
Ksenyia Tuhai (BLR)	1 July 1995 (aged 20)
Olga Zabelinskaya (RUS)	10 May 1980 (aged 35)
Jaime Nielsen (NZL)	3 September 1985 (aged 30)
Francesca Pattaro (ITA)	12 March 1995 (aged 20)
Silvia Valsecchi (ITA)	19 July 1982 (aged 33)
Georgia Williams (NZL)	25 August 1993 (aged 22)

=== Bizkaia–Durango ===
As of 1 January 2016. Ages as of 1 January 2016.

Rider	Date of birth
Lauren Arnouts (NED)	9 November 1994 (aged 21)
Heidi Dalton (RSA)	21 March 1995 (aged 20)
Elisabet Escursell Valero (ESP)	30 October 1996 (aged 19)
Margarita Victoria Garcia (ESP)	2 January 1984 (aged 31)
Roos Hoogeboom (NED)	16 August 1982 (aged 33)
Irati Idirin (ESP)	13 May 1994 (aged 21)
Paula Lanz Blazquez (ESP)	9 October 1996 (aged 19)
Kimberley Le Court (MRI)	23 March 1996 (aged 19)

Rider	Date of birth
Lierni Lekuona Etxebeste (ESP)	8 April 1995 (aged 20)
Naia Leonet (ESP)	20 December 1997 (aged 18)
Lorena Llamas (ESP)	25 October 1987 (aged 28)
Margarita López (ESP)	3 December 1997 (aged 18)
Lise Olivier (RSA)	30 May 1983 (aged 32)
Lourdes Oyarbide Jimenez (ESP)	8 April 1994 (aged 21)
Olga Shekel (UKR)	28 May 1994 (aged 21)
Gleydimar Tapia (VEN)	27 February 1992 (aged 23)

=== Boels–Dolmans ===
As of 1 January 2016. Ages as of 1 January 2016.

Rider	Date of birth
Lizzie Armitstead (GBR)	18 December 1988 (aged 27)
Chantal Blaak (NED)	22 October 1989 (aged 26)
Karol-Ann Canuel (CAN)	18 April 1988 (aged 27)
Demi de Jong (NED)	11 February 1995 (aged 20)
Amalie Dideriksen (DEN)	24 May 1996 (aged 19)
Megan Guarnier (USA)	4 May 1985 (aged 30)

Rider	Date of birth
Nikki Harris (GBR)	30 December 1986 (aged 29)
Romy Kasper (GER)	5 May 1988 (aged 27)
Christine Majerus (LUX)	25 February 1987 (aged 28)
Katarzyna Pawłowska (POL)	16 August 1989 (aged 26)
Evelyn Stevens (USA)	9 May 1983 (aged 32)
Ellen van Dijk (NED)	11 February 1987 (aged 28)

=== BTC City Ljubljana ===
As of 1 January 2016. Ages as of 1 January 2016.

Rider	Date of birth
Polona Batagelj (SLO)	7 June 1989 (aged 26)
Eugenia Bujak (POL)	25 June 1989 (aged 26)
Tanja Elsner (SLO)	16 January 1993 (aged 22)
Jelena Erić (SRB)	15 January 1996 (aged 19)
Špela Kern (SLO)	24 February 1990 (aged 25)
Corinna Lechner (GER)	10 August 1994 (aged 21)
Olena Pavlukhina (AZE)	1 March 1989 (aged 26)

Rider	Date of birth
Urša Pintar (SLO)	3 October 1985 (aged 30)
Anna Plichta (POL)	10 February 1992 (aged 23)
Mia Radotić (CRO)	2 December 1984 (aged 31)
Martina Ritter (AUT)	23 September 1982 (aged 33)
Anja Rugelj (SLO)	25 June 1986 (aged 29)
Laura Simenc (SLO)	25 July 1990 (aged 25)
Urška Žigart (SLO)	4 December 1996 (aged 19)

=== Canyon//SRAM ===
As of 8 February 2016. Ages as of 1 January 2016.

Rider	Date of birth
Alena Amialiusik (BLR)	6 February 1989 (aged 26)
Hannah Barnes (GBR)	4 May 1993 (aged 22)
Lisa Brennauer (GER)	8 June 1988 (aged 27)
Elena Cecchini (ITA)	25 May 1992 (aged 23)
Tiffany Cromwell (AUS)	6 July 1988 (aged 27)

Rider	Date of birth
Barbara Guarischi (ITA)	10 February 1990 (aged 25)
Mieke Kröger (GER)	18 July 1993 (aged 22)
Alexis Ryan (USA)	18 August 1994 (aged 21)
Trixi Worrack (GER)	28 September 1981 (aged 33)

=== Cervélo–Bigla Pro Cycling ===
As of 1 January 2016. Ages as of 1 January 2016.

Rider	Date of birth
Nicole Hanselmann (SUI)	6 May 1991 (aged 24)
Ciara Horne (GBR)	17 September 1989 (aged 26)
Lisa Klein (GER)	15 July 1996 (aged 19)
Clara Koppenburg (GER)	3 August 1995 (aged 20)
Lotta Lepistö (FIN)	28 June 1989 (aged 26)

Rider	Date of birth
Ashleigh Moolman-Pasio (RSA)	9 December 1985 (aged 30)
Joëlle Numainville (CAN)	20 November 1987 (aged 28)
Gabrielle Pilote Fortin (CAN)	26 April 1993 (aged 22)
Stephanie Pohl (GER)	21 October 1987 (aged 28)

=== China Chongming–Liv–Champion System ===
As of 1 January 2016. Ages as of 1 January 2016.

Rider	Date of birth
An Qi (CHN)	22 June 1992 (aged 23)
Bai Yue (CHN)	13 December 1992 (aged 23)
Chen Qiaolin (CHN)	2 September 1996 (aged 19)
Huang Dongyan (CHN)	14 December 1993 (aged 22)
Huang Li (CHN)	23 December 1988 (aged 27)
Jiang Xiujie (CHN)	5 January 1989 (aged 26)
Li Jiaqi (CHN)	27 July 1995 (aged 20)
Liang Hongyu (CHN)	23 October 1990 (aged 25)

Rider	Date of birth
Liu Yanan (CHN)	25 February 1992 (aged 23)
Luo Xiaoling (CHN)	20 September 1988 (aged 27)
Meng Zhao Juan (HKG)	14 December 1989 (aged 26)
Pu Yixian (CHN)	23 December 1992 (aged 23)
Sun Xue (CHN)	23 November 1990 (aged 25)
Wang Wantong (CHN)	16 February 1994 (aged 21)
Zhao Xisha (CHN)	28 September 1992 (aged 23)

=== Colavita/Bianchi ===
As of 1 January 2016. Ages as of 1 January 2016.

Rider	Date of birth
Whitney Allison (USA)	1 March 1988 (aged 27)
Jessica Cutler (USA)	7 September 1979 (aged 36)
Kathryn Donovan (USA)	29 January 1982 (aged 33)
Emma Grant (GBR)	30 September 1991 (aged 24)

Rider	Date of birth
Lauretta Hanson (AUS)	29 October 1994 (aged 21)
Elizabeth Hernandez (USA)	26 March 1982 (aged 33)
Gretchen Stumhofer (USA)	10 April 1989 (aged 26)
Kimberley Wells (AUS)	18 July 1985 (aged 30)

=== Cylance Pro Cycling ===
As of 1 January 2016. Ages as of 1 January 2016.

Rider	Date of birth
Rachele Barbieri (ITA)	21 February 1997 (aged 18)
Kathryn Bertine (SKN)	11 May 1975 (aged 40)
Kristabel Doebel-Hickok (USA)	28 April 1989 (aged 26)
Sheyla Gutiérrez Ruiz (ESP)	1 January 1994 (aged 22)
Shelley Olds (USA)	30 September 1980 (aged 35)
Rossella Ratto (ITA)	20 October 1993 (aged 22)

Rider	Date of birth
Valentina Scandolara (ITA)	1 May 1990 (aged 25)
Doris Schweizer (SUI)	28 August 1989 (aged 26)
Carmen Small (USA)	20 April 1980 (aged 35)
Alison Tetrick (USA)	4 April 1985 (aged 30)
Erica Zaveta (USA)	6 September 1989 (aged 26)

=== Drops ===
As of 1 January 2016. Ages as of 1 January 2016.

Rider	Date of birth
Alice Barnes (GBR)	17 July 1995 (aged 20)
Karla Boddy (GBR)	26 September 1985 (aged 30)
Tamiko Butler (ANT)	4 January 1991 (aged 24)
Laura Cameron (GBR)	27 January 1984 (aged 31)
Sophie Coleman (GBR)	12 August 1990 (aged 25)
Rebecca Durrell (GBR)	25 August 1988 (aged 27)
Jennifer George (GBR)	9 April 1983 (aged 32)

Rider	Date of birth
Laura Massey (GBR)	1 September 1981 (aged 34)
Rose Osborne (GBR)	19 February 1990 (aged 25)
Hannah Payton (GBR)	23 March 1994 (aged 21)
Lucy Shaw (GBR)	17 July 1997 (aged 18)
Annabel Simpson (GBR)	6 June 1990 (aged 25)
Abigail Van Twisk (GBR)	1 March 1997 (aged 18)
Rebecca Womersley (GBR)	6 March 1993 (aged 22)

=== Hagens Berman–Supermint ===
As of 1 January 2016. Ages as of 1 January 2016.

Rider	Date of birth
Megan Alderete (USA)	21 March 1984 (aged 31)
Ivy Audrain (USA)	8 May 1988 (aged 27)
Lindsay Bayer (USA)	31 October 1984 (aged 31)
Carmela Cipriani (ITA)	11 November 1996 (aged 19)
Julie Kuliecza (USA)	4 November 1980 (aged 35)
Scotti Lechuga (USA)	7 January 1983 (aged 32)
Allison Linnell (USA)	2 May 1992 (aged 23)
Sophie Mackay (AUS)	22 April 1985 (aged 30)

Rider	Date of birth
Daniela Magnetto (ITA)	23 February 1996 (aged 19)
Liza Rachetto (USA)	30 January 1974 (aged 41)
Shoshauna Routley (CAN)	20 October 1986 (aged 29)
Basei Marzia Salton (ITA)	7 July 1997 (aged 18)
Jessica Uebelhart (SUI)	16 October 1990 (aged 25)
Elena Utrobina (RUS)	1 January 1985 (aged 31)
Yevgeniya Vysotska (UKR)	11 December 1975 (aged 40)

=== Team Hitec Products ===
As of 2 February 2016

Rider	Date of birth
Susanne Andersen (NOR)	23 July 1998 (aged 17)
Charlotte Becker (GER)	19 May 1983 (aged 32)
Miriam Bjørnsrud (NOR)	9 October 1992 (aged 23)
Simona Frapporti (ITA)	14 July 1988 (aged 27)
Tatiana Guderzo (ITA)	22 August 1984 (aged 31)
Janicke Gunvaldsen (NOR)	19 May 1981 (aged 34)
Vita Heine (NOR)	21 November 1984 (aged 31)
Cecilie Gotaas Johnsen (NOR)	20 April 1976 (aged 39)

Rider	Date of birth
Lauren Kitchen (AUS)	21 November 1990 (aged 25)
Julie Leth (DEN)	13 July 1992 (aged 23)
Tone Hatteland Lima (NOR)	18 December 1979 (aged 36)
Ingrid Lorvik (NOR)	14 February 1987 (aged 28)
Emilie Moberg (NOR)	12 July 1991 (aged 24)
Thea Thorsen (NOR)	15 March 1992 (aged 23)
Kirsten Wild (NED)	15 October 1982 (aged 33)

=== Inpa–Bianchi ===
As of 1 January 2016. Ages as of 1 January 2016.

Rider	Date of birth
Bethany Allen (USA)	6 October 1982 (aged 33)
Ana Maria Covrig (ROU)	8 December 1994 (aged 21)
Claudia Cretti (ITA)	24 May 1996 (aged 19)
Angela Maffeis (ITA)	24 May 1996 (aged 19)
Sara Olsson (SWE)	6 March 1990 (aged 25)

Rider	Date of birth
Michela Pavin (ITA)	15 July 1994 (aged 21)
Tetyana Ryabchenko (UKR)	28 August 1989 (aged 26)
Anna Zita Maria Stricker (ITA)	3 July 1994 (aged 21)
Daiva Tušlaitė (LTU)	18 June 1986 (aged 29)
Lara Vieceli (ITA)	16 July 1993 (aged 22)

=== Lares–Waowdeals ===
As of 1 January 2016. Ages as of 1 January 2016.

Rider	Date of birth
Pia de Quint (BEL)	26 April 1988 (aged 27)
Dorleta Eskamendi Gil (ESP)	2 January 1992 (aged 23)
Tara Gins (BEL)	2 December 1990 (aged 25)
Sarah Inghelbrecht (BEL)	1 October 1992 (aged 23)
Gabriele Jankute (LTU)	18 December 1993 (aged 22)
Veronika Kormos (HUN)	17 August 1992 (aged 23)
Kelly Markus (NED)	7 February 1993 (aged 22)
Alexandra Nessmar (SWE)	23 June 1994 (aged 21)
Sara Penton (SWE)	15 November 1988 (aged 27)

Rider	Date of birth
Sarah Rijkes (AUT)	2 April 1991 (aged 24)
Eileen Roe (GBR)	24 September 1989 (aged 26)
Monique van de Ree (NED)	2 March 1988 (aged 27)
Shana Van Glabeke (BEL)	28 September 1993 (aged 22)
Lotte van Hoek (NED)	8 August 1991 (aged 24)
Jesse Vandenbulcke (BEL)	17 January 1996 (aged 19)
Karen Verhestraeten (BEL)	23 April 1991 (aged 24)
Bryony Van Velzen (NED)	14 May 1996 (aged 19)

=== Lensworld–Zannata ===
As of 1 January 2016. Ages as of 1 January 2016.

Rider	Date of birth
Alice Maria Arzuffi (ITA)	19 November 1994 (aged 21)
Maria Giulia Confalonieri (ITA)	30 March 1993 (aged 22)
Kim De Baat (BEL)	29 May 1991 (aged 24)
Annelies Dom (BEL)	8 April 1986 (aged 29)
Kaat Hannes (BEL)	21 November 1991 (aged 24)
Nina Kessler (NED)	4 July 1988 (aged 27)

Rider	Date of birth
Oxana Kozonchuk (RUS)	28 May 1988 (aged 27)
Hanna Nilsson (SWE)	16 February 1992 (aged 23)
Maaike Polspoel (BEL)	28 March 1989 (aged 26)
Winanda Spoor (NED)	27 January 1991 (aged 24)
Kaat Van der Meulen (BEL)	22 June 1995 (aged 20)

=== Lointek ===
As of 1 January 2016. Ages as of 1 January 2016.

Rider	Date of birth
Maria del Mar Bonnin Palou (ESP)	12 May 1990 (aged 25)
María Calderón Fernandez (ESP)	23 March 1997 (aged 18)
Empar Félix (ESP)	11 April 1997 (aged 18)
Chloe Fraser (GBR)	20 September 1993 (aged 22)
Rocio Del Alba Garcia Martinez (ESP)	29 August 1997 (aged 18)
Alicia González Blanco (ESP)	27 May 1995 (aged 20)
Elisabet Llabres Ferrer (ESP)	11 September 1997 (aged 18)
Belén López Morales (ESP)	18 April 1984 (aged 31)

Rider	Date of birth
Cristina Martínez (ESP)	2 January 1996 (aged 19)
Eider Merino Cortazar (ESP)	2 August 1994 (aged 21)
Anna Ramírez Bauxel (ESP)	14 March 1981 (aged 34)
Teresa Ripoll Sabate (ESP)	3 February 1997 (aged 18)
Gloria Rodríguez Sanchez (ESP)	6 March 1992 (aged 23)
Alba Teruel Ribes (ESP)	17 August 1996 (aged 19)
Aurore Verhoeven (FRA)	15 January 1990 (aged 25)
Lucía González Blanco (ESP)	9 July 1990 (aged 25)

=== Lotto–Soudal Ladies ===
As of 1 January 2016. Ages as of 1 January 2016.

Rider	Date of birth
Isabelle Beckers (BEL)	4 March 1983 (aged 32)
Jessie Daams (BEL)	28 May 1990 (aged 25)
Sofie De Vuyst (BEL)	2 April 1987 (aged 28)
Lieselot Decroix (BEL)	12 May 1987 (aged 28)
Élise Delzenne (FRA)	28 January 1989 (aged 26)
Chantal Hoffmann (LUX)	30 October 1987 (aged 28)
An-Li Kachelhoffer (RSA)	16 August 1987 (aged 28)
Willeke Knol (NED)	10 April 1991 (aged 24)

Rider	Date of birth
Lotte Kopecky (BEL)	10 November 1995 (aged 20)
Claudia Lichtenberg (GER)	17 November 1985 (aged 30)
Emma Pooley (GBR)	3 October 1982 (aged 33)
Anouk Rijff (NED)	6 April 1996 (aged 19)
Fenna Vanhoutte (BEL)	6 July 1997 (aged 18)
Anisha Vekemans (BEL)	17 August 1991 (aged 24)
Susanna Zorzi (ITA)	13 March 1992 (aged 23)

=== Orica–AIS ===
Ages as of 1 January 2016.

Rider	Date of birth
Jessica Allen (AUS)	17 April 1993 (aged 22)
Jenelle Crooks (AUS)	2 July 1994 (aged 21)
Gracie Elvin (AUS)	31 October 1988 (aged 27)
Katrin Garfoot (AUS)	8 October 1981 (aged 34)
Alexandra Manly (AUS)	28 February 1996 (aged 19)
Chloe McConville (AUS)	1 October 1987 (aged 28)
Rachel Neylan (AUS)	9 March 1982 (aged 33)

Rider	Date of birth
Loren Rowney (AUS)	14 October 1988 (aged 27)
Sarah Roy (AUS)	27 February 1986 (aged 29)
Amanda Spratt (AUS)	17 September 1987 (aged 28)
Macey Stewart (AUS)	16 January 1996 (aged 19)
Annemiek van Vleuten (NED)	8 October 1982 (aged 33)
Tayler Wiles (USA)	20 July 1989 (aged 26)
Elizabeth Williams (AUS)	15 August 1983 (aged 32)

=== Parkhotel Valkenburg Continental Team ===
As of 1 January 2016. Ages as of 1 January 2016.

Rider	Date of birth
Eva Buurman (NED)	7 September 1994 (aged 21)
Janneke Ensing (NED)	21 September 1986 (aged 29)
Ilona Hoeksma (NED)	22 May 1991 (aged 24)
Anna Knauer (GER)	20 February 1995 (aged 20)
Vera Koedooder (NED)	31 October 1983 (aged 32)
Jermaine Post (NED)	10 June 1992 (aged 23)

Rider	Date of birth
Pauliena Rooijakkers (NED)	12 May 1993 (aged 22)
Chanella Stougje (NED)	23 October 1996 (aged 19)
Esra Tromp (NED)	15 October 1990 (aged 25)
Jip van den Bos (NED)	12 April 1996 (aged 19)
Natalie van Gogh (NED)	14 September 1974 (aged 41)
Hanna Solovey (UKR)	31 January 1992 (aged 23)

=== Podium Ambition Pro Cycling ===
As of 1 January 2016. Ages as of 1 January 2016.

Rider	Date of birth
Katie Archibald (GBR)	12 March 1994 (aged 21)
Lauren Creamer (IRL)	20 January 1992 (aged 23)
Katie Curtis (GBR)	1 November 1988 (aged 27)
Neah Evans (GBR)	1 August 1990 (aged 25)
Grace Garner (GBR)	19 June 1997 (aged 18)
Amy Gornall (GBR)	13 September 1996 (aged 19)
Elizabeth-Jane Harris (GBR)	7 January 1988 (aged 27)

Rider	Date of birth
Bethany Hayward (GBR)	20 November 1996 (aged 19)
Hayley Jones (GBR)	26 September 1995 (aged 20)
Sharon Laws (GBR)	7 July 1974 (aged 41)
Nicole Moerig (AUS)	4 April 1984 (aged 31)
Claire Rose (GBR)	23 May 1987 (aged 28)
Joanna Rowsell-Shand (GBR)	5 December 1988 (aged 27)
Sarah Storey (GBR)	26 October 1977 (aged 38)

=== Poitou-Charentes.Futuroscope.86 ===
As of 1 January 2016. Ages as of 1 January 2016.

Rider	Date of birth
Aude Biannic (FRA)	27 March 1991 (aged 24)
Charlotte Bravard (FRA)	12 January 1992 (aged 23)
Coralie Demay (FRA)	10 October 1992 (aged 23)
Annabelle Dreville (FRA)	4 March 1995 (aged 20)
Eugénie Duval (FRA)	3 May 1993 (aged 22)
Séverine Eraud (FRA)	24 February 1995 (aged 20)

Rider	Date of birth
Roxane Fournier (FRA)	7 November 1991 (aged 24)
Victorie Guilman (FRA)	25 March 1996 (aged 19)
Pascale Jeuland (FRA)	2 June 1987 (aged 28)
Greta Richioud (FRA)	11 October 1996 (aged 19)
Amélie Rivat (FRA)	14 November 1989 (aged 26)
Eri Yonamine (JPN)	25 April 1991 (aged 24)

=== Rabobank-Liv Woman Cycling Team ===
As of 1 January 2016. Ages as of 1 January 2016.

Rider	Date of birth
Lucinda Brand (NED)	2 July 1989 (aged 26)
Thalita de Jong (NED)	6 November 1993 (aged 22)
Pauline Ferrand-Prévot (FRA)	10 February 1992 (aged 23)
Shara Gillow (AUS)	23 December 1987 (aged 28)
Yara Kastelijn (NED)	9 August 1997 (aged 18)
Roxane Knetemann (NED)	1 April 1987 (aged 28)

Rider	Date of birth
Jeanne Korevaar (NED)	24 September 1996 (aged 19)
Anouska Koster (NED)	20 August 1993 (aged 22)
Katarzyna Niewiadoma (POL)	29 September 1994 (aged 21)
Moniek Tenniglo (NED)	2 May 1988 (aged 27)
Anna van der Breggen (NED)	18 April 1990 (aged 25)
Marianne Vos (NED)	13 May 1987 (aged 28)

=== Rally Cycling ===
As of 1 January 2016. Ages as of 1 January 2016.

Rider	Date of birth
Erica Allar (USA)	5 November 1985 (aged 30)
Elle Anderson (USA)	29 March 1988 (aged 27)
Heather Fischer (USA)	28 November 1988 (aged 27)
Jasmin Glaesser (GER)	8 July 1992 (aged 23)
Kirsti Lay (CAN)	7 April 1988 (aged 27)
Katherine Maine (CAN)	22 November 1997 (aged 18)

Rider	Date of birth
Catherine Ouellette (CAN)	16 May 1996 (aged 19)
Sara Poidevin (CAN)	7 May 1996 (aged 19)
Jessica Prinner (USA)	26 September 1992 (aged 23)
Hannah Ross (USA)	28 January 1990 (aged 25)
Emma White (USA)	23 August 1997 (aged 18)

=== S.C. Michela Fanini Rox ===
As of 1 January 2016. Ages as of 1 January 2016.

Rider	Date of birth
Francesca Balducci (ITA)	1 May 1996 (aged 19)
Michela Balducci (ITA)	30 March 1995 (aged 20)
Manuela De Iuliis (ITA)	23 March 1991 (aged 24)
Nina Gulino (ITA)	18 February 1988 (aged 27)
Eyerusalem Kelil (ETH)	21 January 1992 (aged 23)
Mónika Király (HUN)	10 November 1983 (aged 32)

Rider	Date of birth
Laura Camila Lozano Ramirez (COL)	25 October 1986 (aged 29)
Federica Nicolai (ITA)	2 March 1995 (aged 20)
Edwige Pitel (FRA)	4 June 1967 (aged 48)
Vittoria Reati (ITA)	26 July 1996 (aged 19)
Sari Saarelainen (FIN)	1 March 1981 (aged 34)

=== Servetto Footon ===
As of 1 January 2016. Ages as of 1 January 2016.

Rider	Date of birth
Nicole Brändli (SUI)	18 June 1979 (aged 36)
Anna Ceoloni (ITA)	8 October 1991 (aged 24)
Antri Christoforou (CYP)	2 April 1992 (aged 23)
Alice Gasparini (ITA)	14 December 1997 (aged 18)
Ting Ying Huang (TPE)	29 May 1990 (aged 25)
Eva Lechner (ITA)	1 July 1985 (aged 30)
Molly Meyvisch (BEL)	27 October 1995 (aged 20)
Jolanda Neff (SUI)	5 January 1993 (aged 22)

Rider	Date of birth
Elena Novikova (UKR)	14 January 1983 (aged 32)
Ana Paula Polegatch (BRA)	21 October 1988 (aged 27)
Anna Potokina (RUS)	18 June 1987 (aged 28)
Katia Ragusa (ITA)	19 May 1997 (aged 18)
Maria Vittoria Sperotto (ITA)	20 November 1996 (aged 19)
Gaia Tortolina (ITA)	29 June 1997 (aged 18)
Jessie Walker (GBR)	20 September 1994 (aged 21)
Madison Campbell (NZL)	12 August 1995 (aged 20)

=== Team BMS BIRN ===
As of 1 January 2016. Ages as of 1 January 2016.

Rider	Date of birth
Margriet Kloppenburg (DEN)	18 January 1988 (aged 27)
Pernille Mathiesen (DEN)	5 October 1997 (aged 18)
Camilla Møllebro (DEN)	21 May 1984 (aged 31)
Louise Hansen (DEN)	12 February 1995 (aged 20)
Tine Rasch Hansen (DEN)	1 April 1976 (aged 39)

Rider	Date of birth
Jannie Sand (DEN)	5 September 1980 (aged 35)
Trine Schmidt (DEN)	3 June 1988 (aged 27)
Christina Siggaard (DEN)	24 March 1994 (aged 21)
Cecilie Uttrup Ludwig (DEN)	23 August 1995 (aged 20)
Marie Vilmann (DEN)	21 October 1993 (aged 22)

=== Team Liv–Plantur ===
As of 1 January 2016. Ages as of 1 January 2016.

Rider	Date of birth
Leah Kirchmann (CAN)	30 June 1990 (aged 25)
Floortje Mackaij (NED)	18 October 1995 (aged 20)
Riejanne Markus (NED)	1 September 1994 (aged 21)
Sara Mustonen (SWE)	8 February 1981 (aged 34)
Rozanne Slik (NED)	12 April 1991 (aged 24)

Rider	Date of birth
Julia Soek (NED)	12 December 1990 (aged 25)
Kyara Stijns (NED)	9 October 1995 (aged 20)
Sabrina Stultiens (NED)	8 July 1993 (aged 22)
Carlee Taylor (AUS)	15 February 1989 (aged 26)
Molly Weaver (GBR)	15 March 1994 (aged 21)

=== Tibco–Silicon Valley Bank ===
As of 1 January 2016. Ages as of 1 January 2016.

Rider	Date of birth
Alizée Brien (CAN)	27 September 1993 (aged 22)
Cheryl Clark (USA)	6 September 1986 (aged 29)
Emily Collins (NZL)	16 September 1990 (aged 25)
Lauren Hall (USA)	2 February 1979 (aged 36)
Kathrin Hammes (GER)	9 January 1989 (aged 26)
Joanne Kiesanowski (NZL)	24 May 1979 (aged 36)

Rider	Date of birth
Lauren Komanski (USA)	17 June 1985 (aged 30)
Lindsay Myers (USA)	2 November 1989 (aged 26)
Kendall Ryan (USA)	10 August 1992 (aged 23)
Patricia Schwager (SUI)	6 December 1983 (aged 32)
Lauren Stephens (USA)	28 December 1986 (aged 29)
Brianna Walle (USA)	25 April 1984 (aged 31)

=== Top Girls Fassa Bortolo ===
As of 1 January 2016. Ages as of 1 January 2016.

Rider	Date of birth
Irene Bitto (ITA)	2 November 1993 (aged 22)
Nicole Dal Santo (ITA)	25 August 1995 (aged 20)
Catiuscia Grillo (ITA)	29 December 1996 (aged 19)
Elena Leonardi (ITA)	7 December 1995 (aged 20)

Rider	Date of birth
Sara Mariotto (ITA)	7 June 1997 (aged 18)
Asja Paladin (ITA)	27 September 1994 (aged 21)
Soraya Paladin (ITA)	4 May 1993 (aged 22)
Nadia Quagliotto (ITA)	22 March 1997 (aged 18)

=== Topsport Vlaanderen–Etixx–Guill D'or ===
As of 1 January 2016. Ages as of 1 January 2016.

Rider	Date of birth
Evelyn Arys (BEL)	21 July 1990 (aged 25)
Gilke Croket (BEL)	1 November 1992 (aged 23)
Nel De Crits (BEL)	9 April 1991 (aged 24)
Nicky Degrendele (BEL)	11 October 1996 (aged 19)
Fien Delbaere (BEL)	21 April 1996 (aged 19)
Valerie Demey (BEL)	17 January 1994 (aged 21)
Demmy Druyts (BEL)	4 October 1995 (aged 20)

Rider	Date of birth
Jessy Druyts (BEL)	22 January 1994 (aged 21)
Kelly Druyts (BEL)	21 October 1989 (aged 26)
Lenny Druyts (BEL)	18 May 1997 (aged 18)
Ann-Sophie Duyck (BEL)	23 July 1987 (aged 28)
Steffy Van Den Haute (BEL)	29 November 1993 (aged 22)
Kelly Van den Steen (BEL)	1 September 1995 (aged 20)
Saartje Vandenbroucke (BEL)	13 February 1996 (aged 19)

=== Twenty16–Ridebiker ===
As of 1 January 2016. Ages as of 1 January 2016.

Rider	Date of birth
Kaitlin Antonneau (USA)	1 January 1992 (aged 24)
Allison Arensman (USA)	19 March 1994 (aged 21)
Kristin Armstrong (USA)	11 August 1973 (aged 42)
Sofía Arreola Navarro (MEX)	22 April 1991 (aged 24)
Holly Breck (USA)	27 May 1992 (aged 23)
Jessica Cerra (USA)	1 May 1982 (aged 33)
Janelle Cole (USA)	19 October 1996 (aged 19)

Rider	Date of birth
Allie Dragoo (USA)	17 December 1989 (aged 26)
Chloé Dygert (USA)	1 January 1997 (aged 19)
Annie Foreman-Mackey (CAN)	26 June 1991 (aged 24)
Alison Jackson (CAN)	14 December 1988 (aged 27)
Jennifer Tetrick (USA)	15 November 1981 (aged 34)
Leah Thomas (USA)	30 May 1989 (aged 26)

=== UnitedHealthcare ===
As of 1 January 2016. Ages as of 1 January 2016.

Rider	Date of birth
Laura Brown (CAN)	27 November 1986 (aged 29)
Rushlee Buchanan (NZL)	20 January 1988 (aged 27)
Annie Ewart (CAN)	29 September 1993 (aged 22)
Katharine Hall (USA)	6 January 1987 (aged 28)
Cari Higgins (USA)	5 October 1976 (aged 39)
Abigail Mickey (USA)	3 July 1990 (aged 25)

Rider	Date of birth
Diana Peñuela (COL)	8 September 1986 (aged 29)
Laurel Rathbun (USA)	10 May 1996 (aged 19)
Coryn Rivera (USA)	26 August 1992 (aged 23)
Iris Slappendel (NED)	18 February 1985 (aged 30)
Lauren Tamayo (USA)	25 October 1983 (aged 32)
Linda Villumsen (NZL)	9 April 1985 (aged 30)

=== Visit Dallas DNA Pro Cycling ===
As of 1 January 2016. Ages as of 1 January 2016.

Rider	Date of birth
Anna Grace Christiansen (USA)	29 July 1985 (aged 30)
Lauren De Crescenzo (USA)	3 September 1990 (aged 25)
Jamie Gilgen (CAN)	22 October 1981 (aged 34)
Mandy Heintz (USA)	27 July 1981 (aged 34)
Catherine Kim (GBR)	12 May 1971 (aged 44)
Kemille King (USA)	2 January 1977 (aged 38)
Nina Marie Laughlin (USA)	8 December 1991 (aged 24)
Mia Manganello (USA)	27 October 1989 (aged 26)

Rider	Date of birth
Melinda Mccutcheon (USA)	13 March 1984 (aged 31)
Amanda Miller (USA)	13 December 1986 (aged 29)
Breanne Nalder (USA)	2 October 1984 (aged 31)
Beth Ann Orton (USA)	15 August 1981 (aged 34)
Tiffany Pezzulo (USA)	13 March 1975 (aged 40)
Anna Sanders (USA)	25 September 1981 (aged 34)
Sara Tussey (USA)	6 August 1979 (aged 36)

=== Vitalogic Astrokalb Radunion NÖ ===
As of 1 January 2016. Ages as of 1 January 2016.

Rider	Date of birth
Anna Badegruber (AUT)	14 January 1997 (aged 18)
Nathalie Birli (AUT)	27 June 1992 (aged 23)
Julia Deuerlein (GER)	1 May 1990 (aged 25)
Astrid Gassner (AUT)	30 October 1995 (aged 20)
Lisa Lackner (AUT)	7 October 1982 (aged 33)
Elise Maes (LUX)	27 January 1992 (aged 23)

Rider	Date of birth
Christina Perchtold (AUT)	11 May 1993 (aged 22)
Amber Pierce (USA)	25 March 1981 (aged 34)
Sandra Reisenhofer (AUT)	13 March 1995 (aged 20)
Lucia Valachova (SVK)	31 December 1997 (aged 18)
Elena Valentini (ITA)	30 March 1992 (aged 23)

=== Weber Shimano Ladies Power ===
As of 1 January 2016. Ages as of 1 January 2016.

Rider	Date of birth
Micaela Belen Barroso (ARG)	11 February 1997 (aged 18)
Maria Fadiga (ARG)	18 December 1987 (aged 28)
Luciene Ferreira da Silva (BRA)	12 February 1985 (aged 30)
Cristina Irma Greve (ARG)	20 July 1987 (aged 28)

Rider	Date of birth
Jessenia Meneses (COL)	18 June 1995 (aged 20)
Rocio Parrado Guarnizo (COL)	29 November 1982 (aged 33)
Caterin Elisabeth Previley (ARG)	20 December 1991 (aged 24)
Aranza Valentina Villalon Sanchez (CHI)	18 June 1995 (aged 20)

=== Wiggle High5 ===
As of 1 January 2016. Ages as of 1 January 2016.

Rider	Date of birth
Mara Abbott (USA)	14 November 1985 (aged 30)
Giorgia Bronzini (ITA)	3 August 1983 (aged 32)
Anna Christian (GBR)	6 August 1995 (aged 20)
Audrey Cordon (FRA)	22 September 1989 (aged 26)
Jolien D'Hoore (BEL)	14 March 1990 (aged 25)
Annette Edmondson (AUS)	12 December 1991 (aged 24)
Lucy Garner (GBR)	20 September 1994 (aged 21)
Mayuko Hagiwara (JPN)	16 October 1986 (aged 29)

Rider	Date of birth
Chloe Hosking (AUS)	1 October 1990 (aged 25)
Emma Johansson (SWE)	23 September 1983 (aged 32)
Danielle King (GBR)	21 November 1990 (aged 25)
Elisa Longo Borghini (ITA)	10 December 1991 (aged 24)
Amy Pieters (NED)	1 June 1991 (aged 24)
Amy Roberts (GBR)	24 December 1994 (aged 21)
Anna Sanchis Chafer (ESP)	18 October 1987 (aged 28)

=== Xirayas de San Luis–OPW ===
As of 1 January 2016. Ages as of 1 January 2016.

Rider	Date of birth
Talia ayelen Aguirre (ARG)	17 February 1991 (aged 24)
Maria Carla Alvarez (ARG)	17 September 1984 (aged 31)
Mariela Analia Delgado (ARG)	26 July 1986 (aged 29)
Antonella Leonardi (ARG)	19 October 1991 (aged 24)
Paola Muñoz (CHI)	13 April 1986 (aged 29)

Rider	Date of birth
Estefania Pilz (ARG)	7 August 1985 (aged 30)
Valeria Pintos (ARG)	17 November 1979 (aged 36)
Alicia Claudia Reynoso Pueyo (ARG)	25 August 1975 (aged 40)
Julia Sanchez Parma (ARG)	14 December 1990 (aged 25)

Preceded by 2015	List of UCI Women's Teams; 2016	Succeeded by 2017
