= Madison Campbell =

Madison Campbell may refer to:

- Madison Campbell (cyclist), New Zealand cyclist
- Madison Campbell (businessperson), American model and businesswoman
- Matthew Campbell (minister), or Madison Campbell, Baptist preacher in Richmond, Kentucky
