= Karla Boddy =

British cyclist

Personal information
- Born: 26 September 1985 (age 41)

Cycling career
- Sport: Cycling
- Role: Rider

Karla Boddy (born 26 September 1985) is a British professional racing cyclist who rides for Drops Cycling Team.

== See also ==
- List of 2016 UCI Women's Teams and riders
