= Laura Cameron =

Laura Cameron may refer to:

- Laura Cameron (cyclist) (born 1984), British cyclist
- Laura Jean Cameron (born 1966), Canadian human geographer and historian
- Laura Cameron, character in the TV series Pan Am, played by Margot Robbie
