= Jessica Prinner =

American cyclist

Personal information
- Born: September 26, 1992 (age 34)

Cycling career
- Sport: Cycling
- Role: Rider

Jessica Prinner (born September 26, 1992) is an American professional racing cyclist who rides for Rally Cycling.

== See also ==
- List of 2016 UCI Women's Teams and riders
