= Hannah Ross =

American cyclist

Personal information
- Born: January 28, 1990 (age 36)

Cycling career
- Sport: Cycling
- Role: Rider

Hannah Ross (born January 28, 1990) is an American professional racing cyclist who rides for Rally Cycling.

== See also ==
- List of 2016 UCI Women's Teams and riders
