= Lorena Llamas =

Spanish cyclist (born 1987)

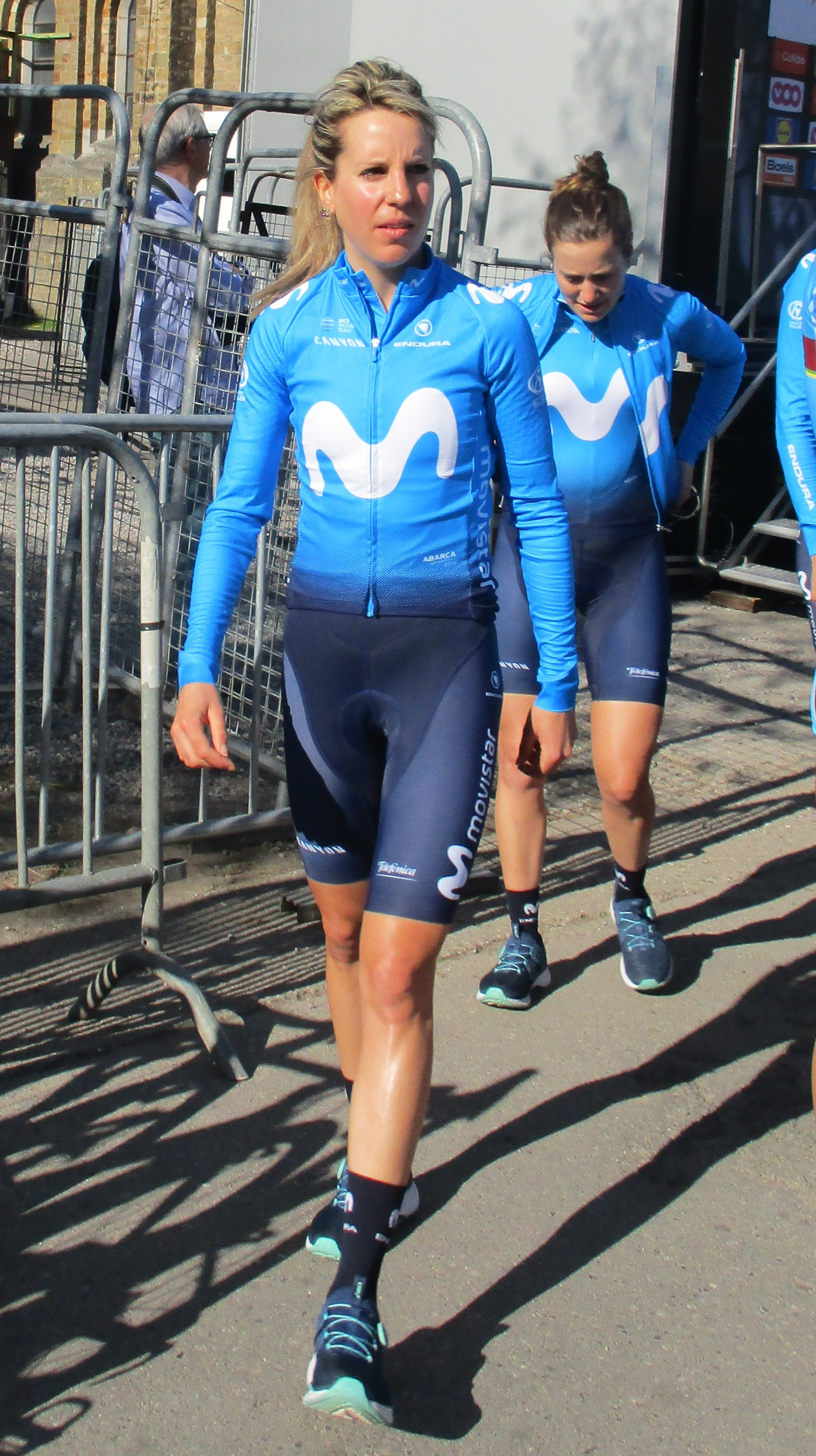
- Llamas in 2018.

Personal information
- Full name: Lorena Llamas García
- Born: 28 October 1987 (age 38) Igualada, Spain

Cycling career
- Sport: Cycling
- Current team: Retired
- Discipline: Road
- Role: Rider
- Rider type: Climber

Amateur teams
- 2015: CA n'Anglada
- 2016: Frigoríficos Costa Brava–Naturalium

Professional teams
- 2016–2017: Bizkaia–Durango
- 2018–2019: Movistar Team

Lorena Llamas García (born 28 October 1987) is a Spanish former professional racing cyclist, who rode professionally between 2016 and 2019 for the Bizkaia–Durango and Movistar Team squads.

== See also ==
- List of 2016 UCI Women's Teams and riders
