= Lisa Lackner =

Austrian cyclist

Personal information
- Born: 7 October 1982 (age 44)

Cycling career
- Sport: Cycling
- Role: Rider

Lisa Lackner (born 7 October 1982) is an Austrian professional racing cyclist who rides for Vitalogic Astrokalb Radunion Nö.

== See also ==
- List of 2016 UCI Women's Teams and riders
