= Elisabet Llabrés =

Spanish cyclist

Personal information
- Full name: Elisabet Llabrés Ferrer
- Born: 11 September 1997 (age 29) Santa Maria del Camí, Spain

Cycling career
- Sport: Cycling
- Discipline: Road
- Role: Rider

Amateur team
- 2018: Glas–Smurfit Kappa

Professional teams
- 2016–2017: Lointek
- 2019: Massi–Tactic

Elisabet Llabrés Ferrer (born 11 September 1997) is a Spanish professional racing cyclist, who last rode for UCI Women's Team Massi–Tactic.

== See also ==
- List of 2016 UCI Women's Teams and riders
