= Hannah Payton =

British cyclist

Personal information
- Full name: Hannah Christina Payton
- Born: 23 March 1994 (age 32) Stourbridge, West Midlands, England

Cycling career
- Sport: Cycling
- Disciplines: Road; Cyclo-cross
- Role: Rider
- Rider type: Road: Climbing specialist; Cyclo-cross

Amateur teams
- 2014: WyndyMilla–Reynolds
- 2015: Corley Cycles–Drops RT
- 2015–2019: Team Kinesis UK (cyclo-cross)

Professional team
- 2016–2019: Drops (road)

Hannah Christina Payton (born 23 March 1994) is an English professional racing cyclist, who last rode for UCI Women's Team Drops in road racing, and Team Kinesis UK in cyclo-cross.

== See also ==
- List of 2016 UCI Women's Teams and riders
