= Daniela Magnetto =

Italian cyclist

Personal information
- Full name: Daniela Magnetto Allietta
- Born: 23 February 1996 (age 30)

Cycling career
- Sport: Cycling
- Discipline: Road
- Role: Rider

Professional teams
- 2016: Hagens Berman–Supermint
- 2017–2018: Conceria Zabri–Fanini–Guerciotti

Daniela Magnetto Allietta (born 23 February 1996) is an Italian professional racing cyclist, who last rode for UCI Women's Team Conceria Zabri–Fanini.

== See also ==
- List of 2016 UCI Women's Teams and riders
