= Giulia Nanni =

Italian cyclist

Personal information
- Born: 14 April 1997 (age 29)

Cycling career
- Sport: Cycling
- Role: Rider

Giulia Nanni (born 14 April 1997) is an Italian professional racing cyclist who rides for Bepink.

== See also ==
- List of 2016 UCI Women's Teams and riders
