= Annie Simpson =

British cyclist

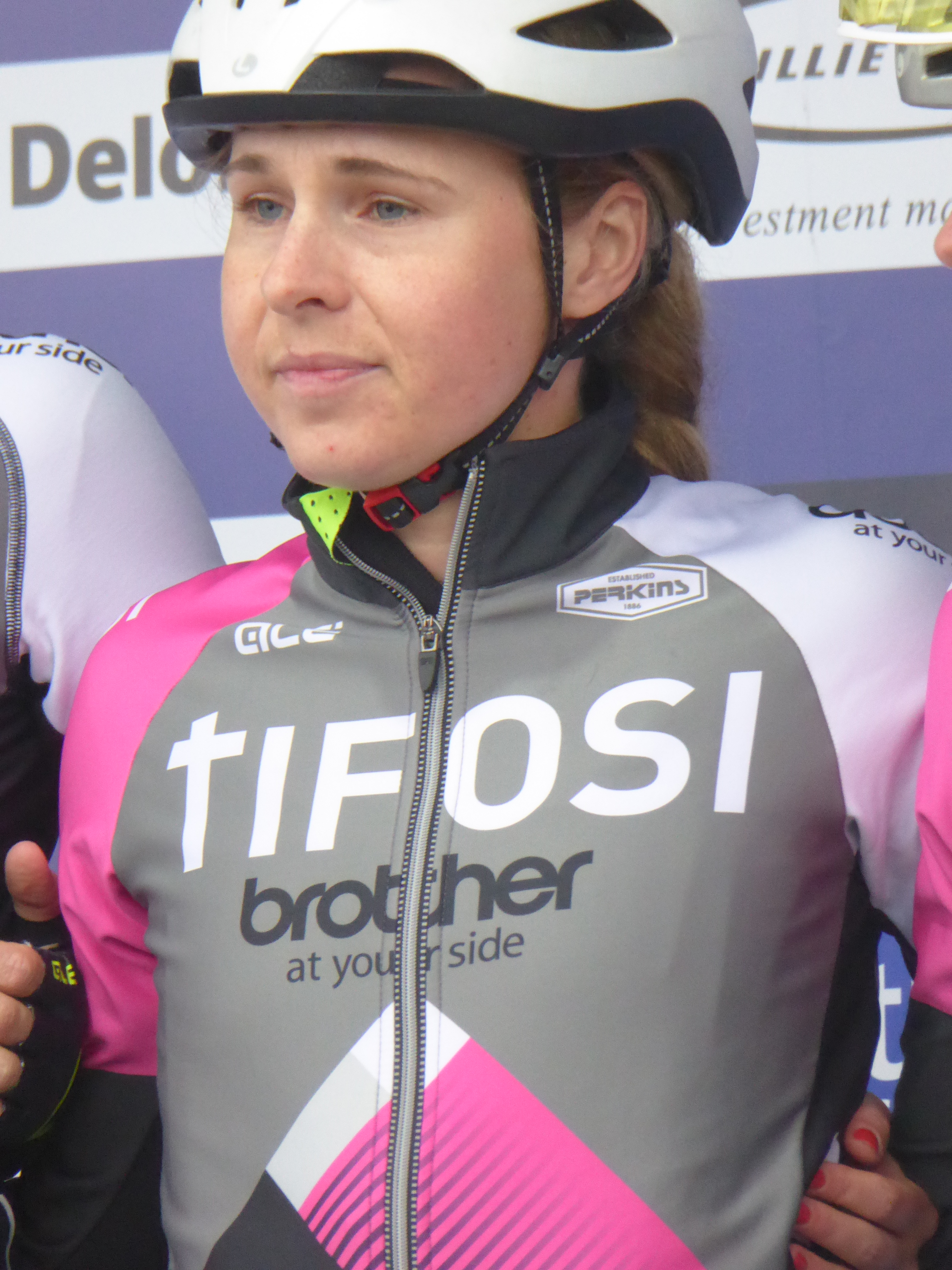
- Simpson at the 2019 Women's Tour of Scotland

Personal information
- Full name: Annabel Simpson
- Nicknames: Annie, Simo
- Born: 6 June 1990 (age 36)

Cycling career
- Sport: Cycling
- Current team: Retired
- Disciplines: Road; Cyclo-cross; Mountain biking
- Role: Rider

Amateur teams
- 2004: Ilkley Cycles RT
- 2006: Discovery Junior Cycling Club
- 2007–2008: WXC Mountain Bike Team UK
- 2009: Felt Racing
- 2010–2012: Matrix Pro Cycling
- 2013–2019: Hope Factory Racing (off-road)
- 2015: OTE Sports (road)
- 2019: Brother UK–Tifosi (road)

Professional team
- 2016–2018: Drops (road)

Managerial team
- 2020: CAMS–Tifosi

Annabel Simpson (born 6 June 1990) is a British former racing cyclist, who competed in multiple disciplines in the sport, including at UCI Women's Team level with Trek–Drops between 2016 and 2018. She finished third in the under-23 event at the 2012 British National Road Race Championships, and third in the cross-country at the 2015 British National Mountain Biking Championships.

== See also ==
- List of 2016 UCI Women's Teams and riders
