= Pia de Quint =

Belgian cyclist

Personal information
- Born: 26 April 1988 (age 38)

Cycling career
- Sport: Cycling
- Role: Rider

Pia de Quint (born 26 April 1988) is a Belgian professional racing cyclist who rides for Lares–Waowdeals.

== See also ==
- List of 2016 UCI Women's Teams and riders
