= Margriet Kloppenburg =

Danish cyclist

Personal information
- Born: 18 January 1988 (age 38)

Cycling career
- Sport: Cycling
- Role: Rider

Margriet Kloppenburg (born 18 January 1988) is a Danish professional racing cyclist who rides for Team BMS BIRN.

== See also ==
- List of 2016 UCI Women's Teams and riders
