= Janicke Gunvaldsen =

Norwegian cyclist

Personal information
- Born: 19 May 1981 (age 45)

Cycling career
- Sport: Cycling
- Role: Rider

Janicke Gunvaldsen (born 19 May 1981) is a Norwegian professional racing cyclist who rides for Team Hitec Products.

== See also ==
- List of 2016 UCI Women's Teams and riders
