= Sara Mariotto =

Italian cyclist

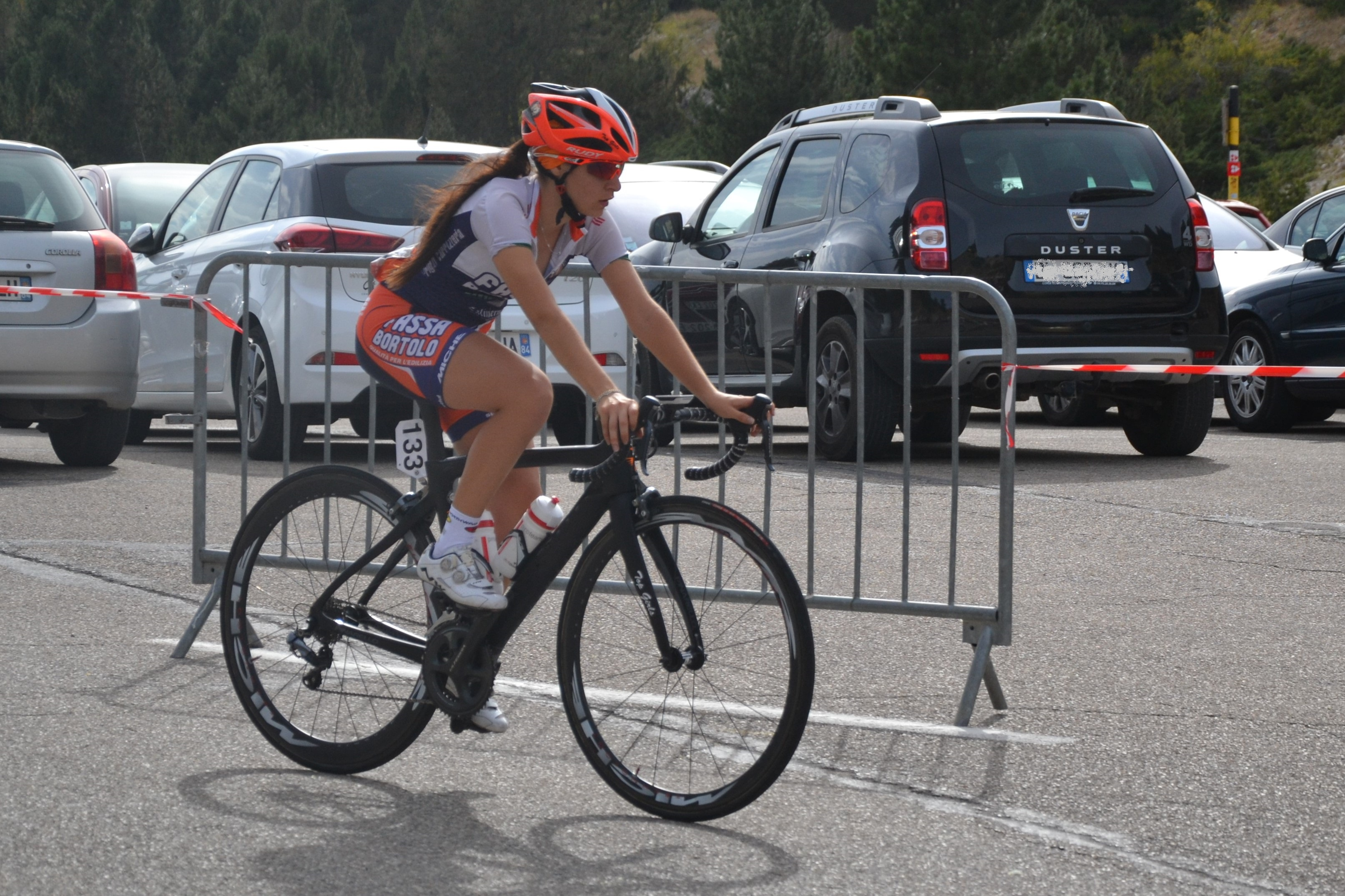
- Mariotto in 2016.

Personal information
- Full name: Sara Mariotto
- Born: 7 June 1997 (age 29)

Cycling career
- Sport: Cycling
- Discipline: Road
- Role: Rider

Professional team
- 2016–2018: Top Girls Fassa Bortolo

Sara Mariotto (born 7 June 1997) is an Italian professional racing cyclist, who most recently rode with UCI Women's Team Top Girls Fassa Bortolo.

== See also ==
- List of 2016 UCI Women's Teams and riders
