= Empar Félix =

Spanish cyclist

Personal information
- Born: 11 April 1994 (age 32)

Cycling career
- Sport: Cycling
- Role: Rider

Empar Félix (born 11 April 1994) is a Spanish professional racing cyclist who rides for Lointek.

== See also ==
- List of 2016 UCI Women's Teams and riders
