= Tanja Elsner =

Slovenian cyclist

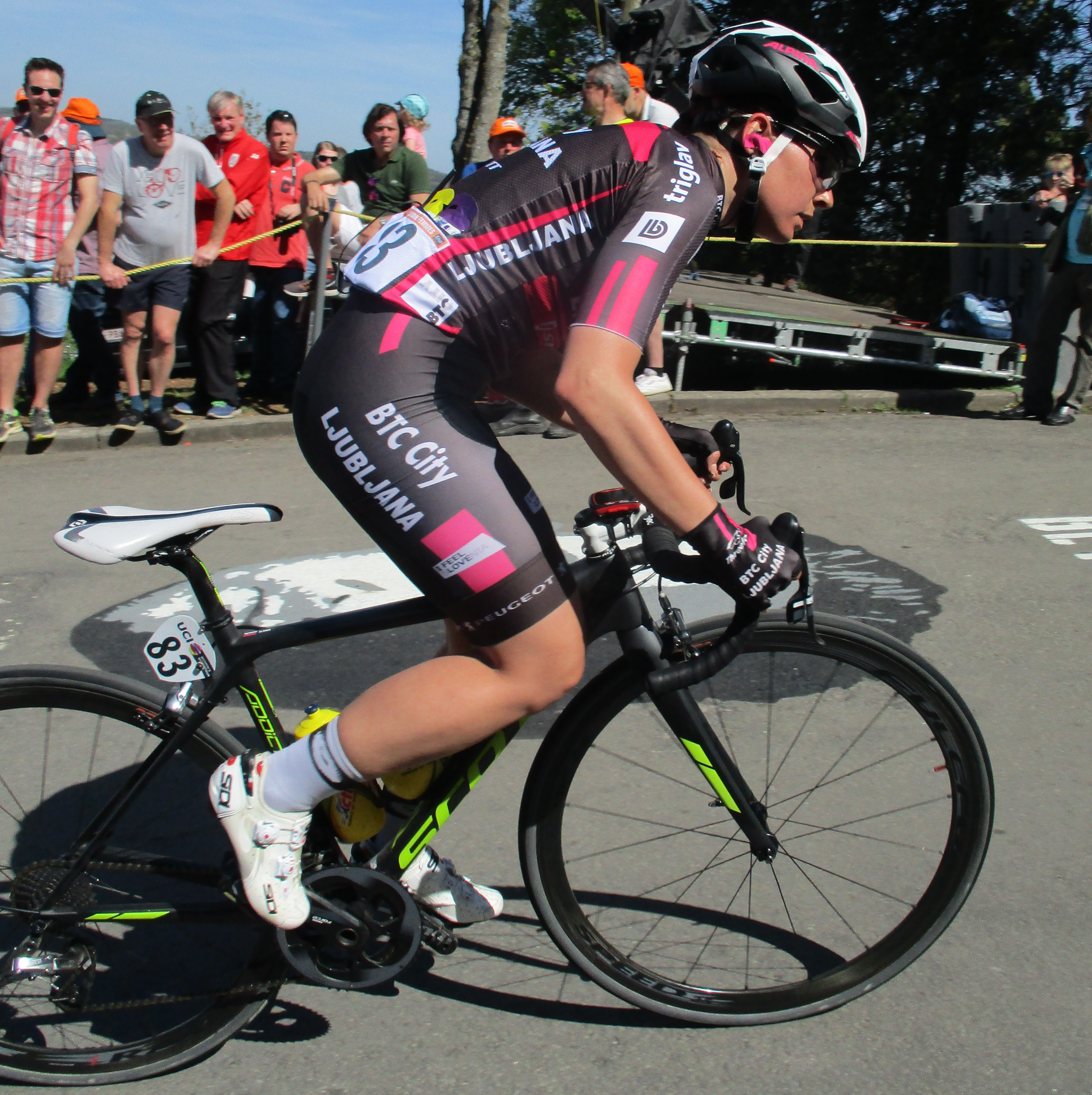
- Elsner in 2018.

Personal information
- Full name: Tanja Elsner
- Born: 16 January 1993 (age 33) Ljubljana, Slovenia

Cycling career
- Sport: Cycling
- Discipline: Road
- Role: Rider

Professional team
- 2016–2018: BTC City Ljubljana

Tanja Elsner (born 16 January 1993) is a Slovenian professional racing cyclist, who last rode for UCI Women's Team BTC City Ljubljana.

== See also ==
- List of 2016 UCI Women's Teams and riders
