= Rose Osborne =

British cyclist

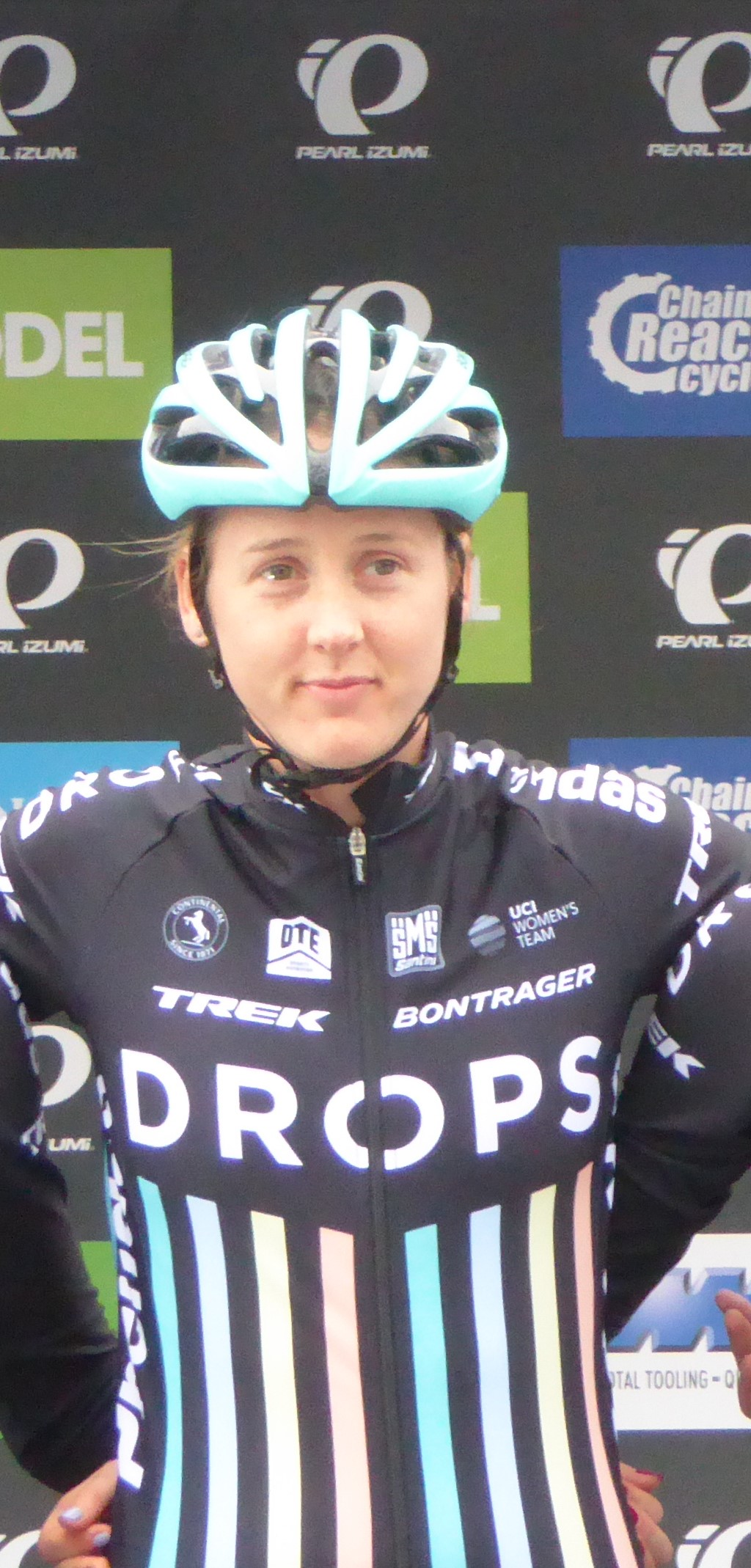
- Osborne in 2016.

Personal information
- Full name: Rose Osborne
- Born: 19 February 1990 (age 36)

Cycling career
- Sport: Cycling
- Current team: Lifeplus Wahoo
- Role: Rider

Professional team
- 2016: Drops

Rose Osborne (born 19 February 1990) is a British professional racing cyclist who rides for Lifeplus Wahoo.

== See also ==
- List of 2016 UCI Women's Teams and riders
