= Laura Cameron (cyclist) =

British cyclist (born 1984)

Personal information
- Born: 27 January 1984 (age 42)

Cycling career
- Sport: Cycling
- Role: Rider

Laura Cameron (born 27 January 1984) is a British professional racing cyclist who rides for Drops Cycling Team.

== See also ==
- List of 2016 UCI Women's Teams and riders
