= Marie Vilmann =

Danish cyclist (born 1993)

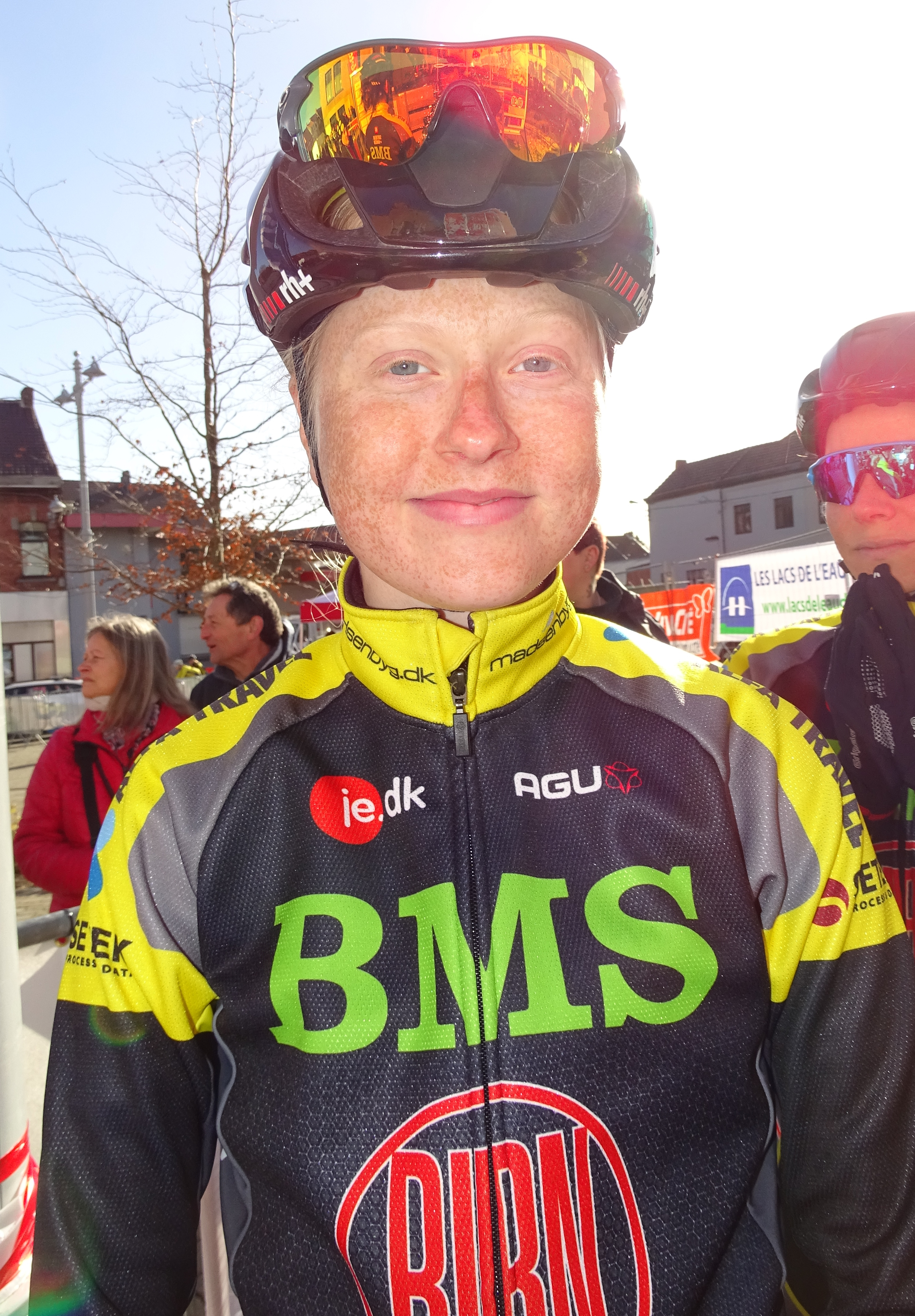
- Vilmann in 2016.

Personal information
- Full name: Marie Vilmann
- Born: 21 October 1993 (age 32)

Cycling career
- Sport: Cycling
- Discipline: Road
- Role: Rider

Professional teams
- 2016: Team BMS BIRN
- 2017–2018: Cervélo–Bigla Pro Cycling

Marie Vilmann (born 21 October 1993) is a Danish professional racing cyclist, who last rode for UCI Women's Team Cervélo–Bigla Pro Cycling.

== See also ==
- List of 2016 UCI Women's Teams and riders
