= Irati Idirin =

Spanish cyclist

Personal information
- Full name: Irati Idirin Egaña
- Born: 13 May 1994 (age 32) Zeberio, Spain

Cycling career
- Sport: Cycling
- Current team: Murias–Limousin
- Discipline: Road
- Role: Rider

Amateur team
- 2019–: Murias–Limousin

Professional team
- 2016–2018: Bizkaia–Durango

Irati Idirin Egaña (born 13 May 1994) is a Spanish professional racing cyclist, who currently rides for Spanish amateur team Murias–Limousin.

== See also ==
- List of 2016 UCI Women's Teams and riders
