= Claudia Cretti =

Italian cyclist (born 1996)

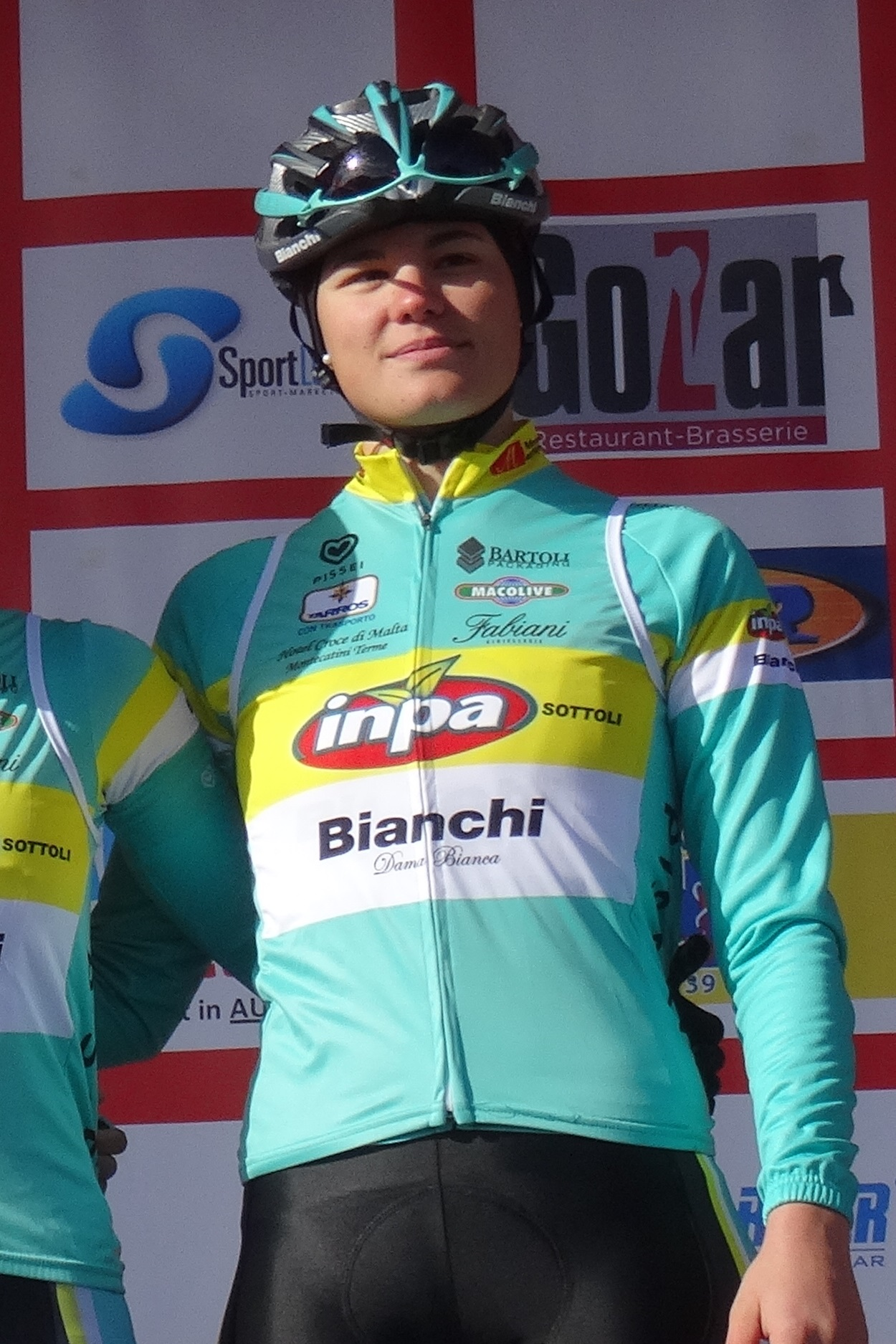
- Claudia Cretti in the 2015 Le Samyn des Dames

Personal information
- Born: 24 May 1996 (age 30)

Cycling career
- Sport: Cycling
- Role: Rider

Professional teams
- 2015-2016: Inpa-Bianchi
- 2017: Valcar-PBM
Medal record
Women's para-cycling
Representing Italy
Track World Championships
Gold medal – first place	2025 Rio de Janeiro	Time trial C5
Gold medal – first place	2025 Rio de Janeiro	Elimination C5
Gold medal – first place	2025 Rio de Janeiro	Scratch race C5
Gold medal – first place	2026 Apeldoorn	Scratch race C5
Silver medal – second place	2023 Glasgow	Scratch race C5
Silver medal – second place	2023 Glasgow	Omnium C5
Silver medal – second place	2024 Rio de Janeiro	Scratch race C5
Silver medal – second place	2026 Apeldoorn	Time trial C5
Silver medal – second place	2026 Apeldoorn	Elimination C5
Bronze medal – third place	2023 Glasgow	Individual pursuit C5
Bronze medal – third place	2024 Rio de Janeiro	Individual pursuit C5
Bronze medal – third place	2024 Rio de Janeiro	Omnium C5
European Championships
Silver medal – second place	2023 Rotterdam	Road race C5
Bronze medal – third place	2023 Rotterdam	Time trial C5

Claudia Cretti (born 24 May 1996) is an Italian professional racing cyclist. In 2017 she rode for the Italian Valcar-PBM team. During the 7th stage of the Giro Rosa, Cretti was seriously injured in a crash and was being kept in a medically induced coma. Later that month she was able to communicate. In November 2017 she did ride a bike for the first time. In February 2019 she announced to compete as a paracyclist.

== Career results ==
2013
1st Junior Women's Scratch, European Track Championships (under-23 & junior)
2014
3rd Junior Women's Scratch, European Track Championships (under-23 & junior)
2nd Team Pursuit, 2014 UCI Juniors Track World Championships ( with Martina Alzini, Maria Vittoria Sperotto and Daniela Magnetto)
2016
2nd Team Pursuit, UEC European U23 Track Championships (with Martina Alzini, Michela Maltese and Francesca Pattaro)
2nd Scratch Race, 6 giorni delle rose - Fiorenzuola

== See also ==
- List of 2015 UCI Women's Teams and riders
