= Naia Leonet =

Spanish cyclist

Personal information
- Full name: Naia Leonet
- Born: 20 December 1997 (age 28)

Cycling career
- Sport: Cycling
- Role: Rider

Naia Leonet (born 20 December 1997) is a Spanish professional racing cyclist who rides for Bizkaia–Durango.

== See also ==
- List of 2016 UCI Women's Teams and riders
