= Sandra Reisenhofer =

Austrian cyclist

Personal information
- Born: 13 March 1995 (age 31)

Cycling career
- Sport: Cycling
- Role: Rider

Sandra Reisenhofer (born 13 March 1995) is an Austrian professional racing cyclist who rides for Vitalogic Astrokalb Radunion Nö.

== See also ==
- List of 2016 UCI Women's Teams and riders
