= Rebecca Womersley =

English cyclist

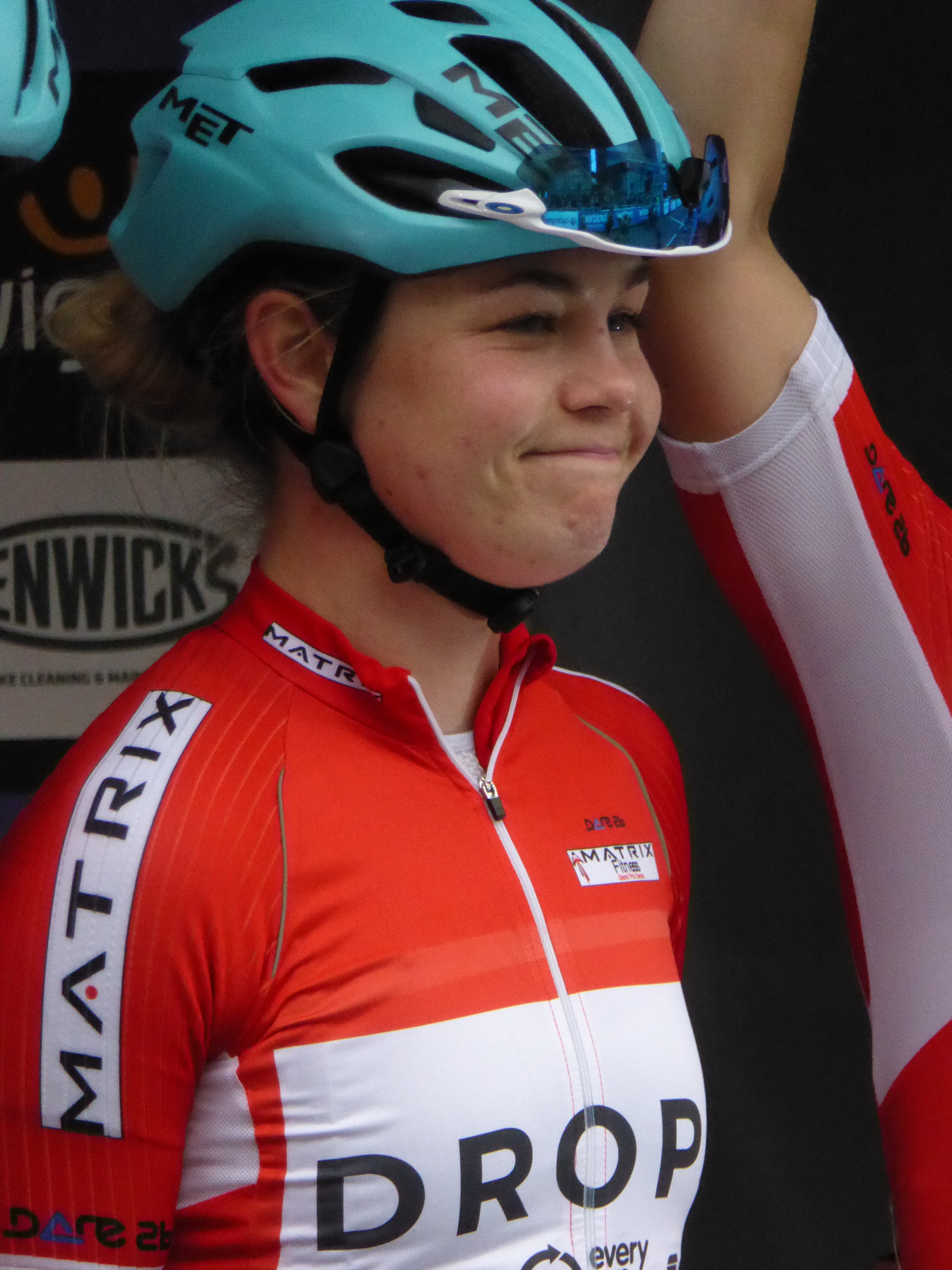
- Womersley in 2017

Personal information
- Full name: Rebecca Womersley
- Born: 6 March 1993 (age 33) Mirfield, England, England

Cycling career
- Sport: Cycling
- Current team: Lifeplus Wahoo
- Disciplines: Road and cyclo-cross
- Role: Rider

Amateur teams
- 2014: WyndyMilla–Reynolds
- 2015: Corley Cycles–Drops RT
- 2018: Bianchi Dama

Professional team
- 2016–2017: Drops

Rebecca Womersley (born 6 March 1993) is an English former professional racing cyclist who last rode for Lifeplus Wahoo. She is the granddaughter of racing cyclist Brian Robinson and sister of cyclist Jake Womersley.

== See also ==
- List of 2016 UCI Women's Teams and riders
