= Annasley Park =

British cyclist

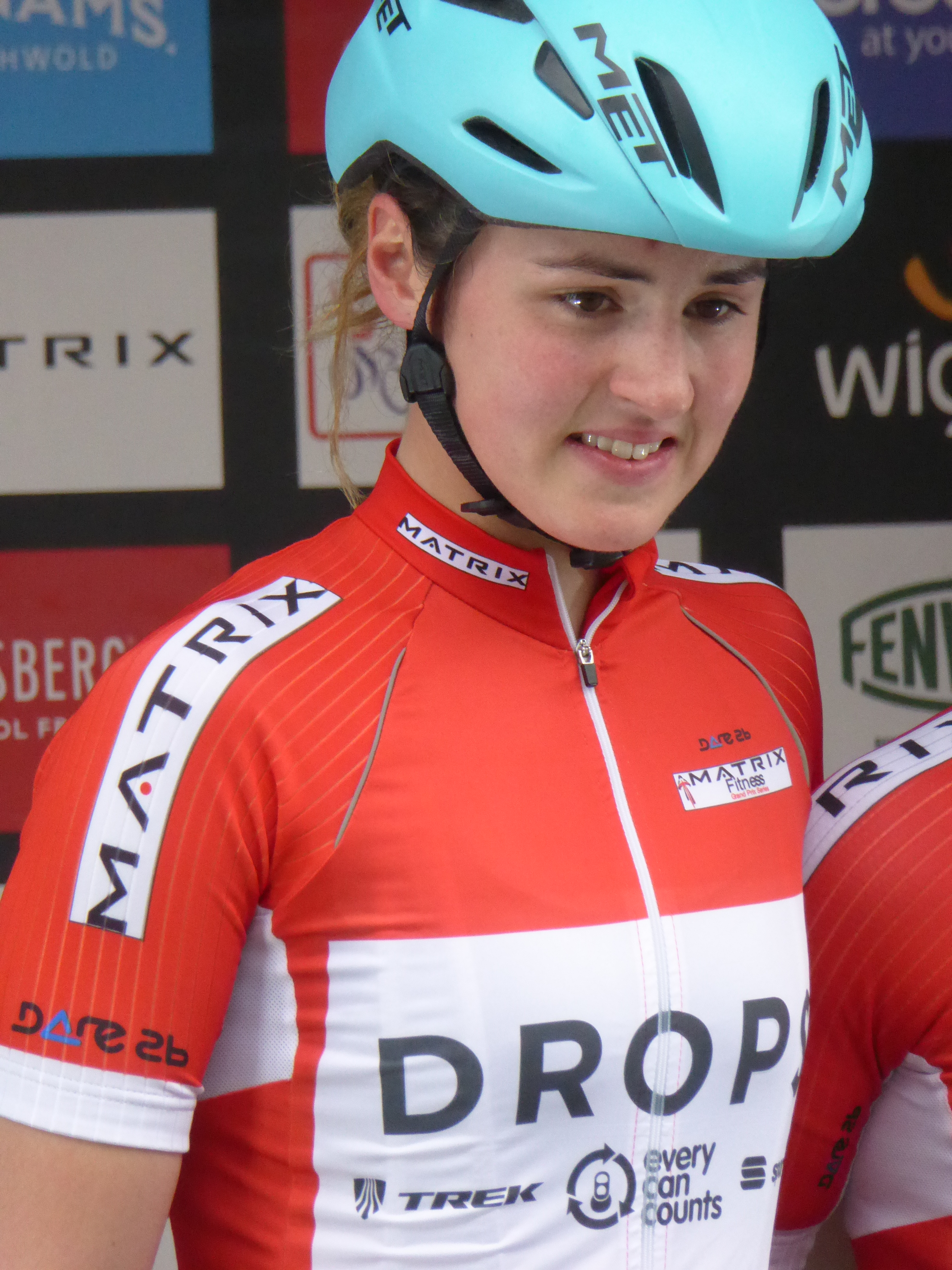
- Park in 2017

Personal information
- Full name: Annasley Park
- Born: 24 April 1996 (age 30) Hereford, Herefordshire, England

Cycling career
- Sport: Cycling
- Current team: Retired
- Discipline: Road
- Role: Rider

Amateur team
- 2015: Team Giordana Triton

Professional teams
- 2016: Team Breeze
- 2017–2018: Drops

Annasley Park (born 24 April 1996) is an English former professional racing cyclist, who rode professionally between 2016 and 2018 for Team Breeze and Trek–Drops. She rode in the women's road race at the 2016 UCI Road World Championships, finishing in 82nd place. Park finished second in the individual standings of the 2017 Matrix Fitness Grand Prix Series.

== Major results ==
2015
10th London Nocturne
2016
Dublin Track Cycling International

2nd Individual pursuit
3rd Scratch

2017
1st Team pursuit, National Track Championships (with Ellie Dickinson, Manon Lloyd and Emily Nelson)
2nd Overall Matrix Fitness Grand Prix Series
