= Tine Rasch Hansen =

Danish cyclist

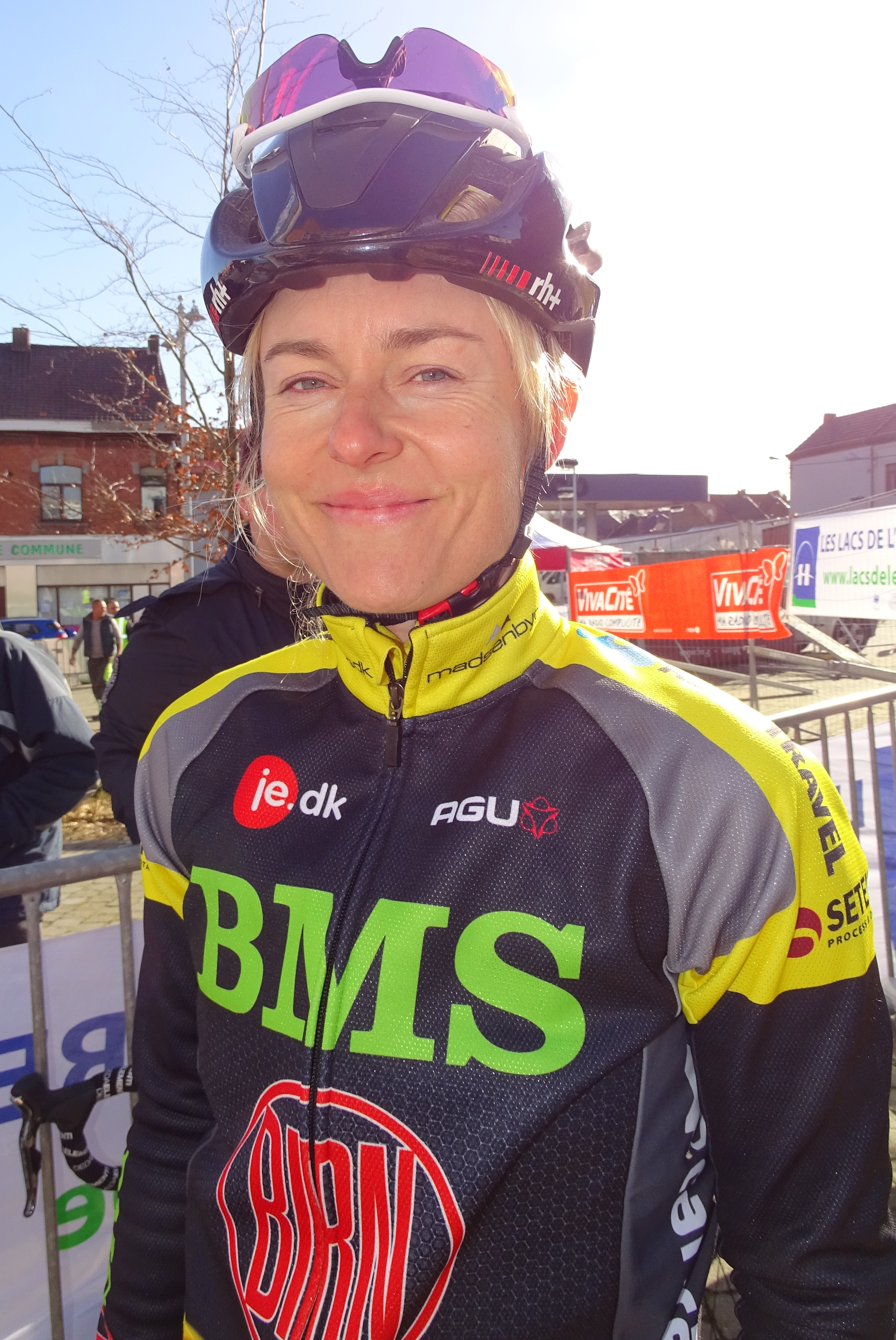

Personal information
- Born: 10 April 1976 (age 50)

Cycling career
- Sport: Cycling
- Role: Rider

Tine Rasch Hansen (born 10 April 1976) is a Danish professional racing cyclist who rides for Team BMS BIRN.

== See also ==
- List of 2016 UCI Women's Teams and riders
