= Eva Buurman =

Dutch cyclist (born 1994)

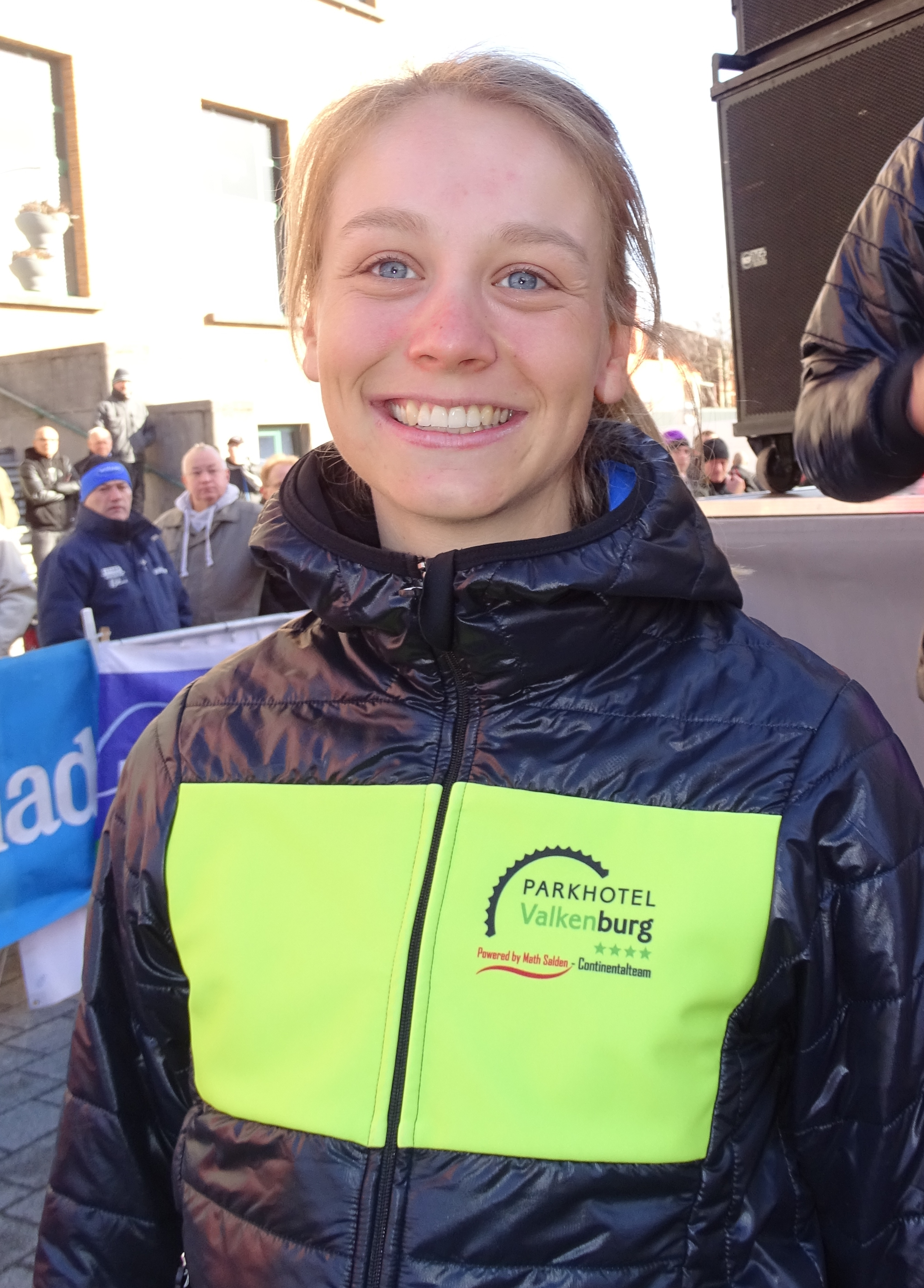
- Buurman at the 2016 Le Samyn des Dames

Personal information
- Full name: Eva Buurman
- Born: 7 September 1994 (age 32) Wervershoof, Netherlands

Cycling career
- Sport: Cycling
- Discipline: Road
- Role: Rider

Amateur team
- 2015: Jan van Arckel

Professional teams
- 2016–2017: Parkhotel Valkenburg Continental Team
- 2018: Trek–Drops
- 2019–2020: Boels–Dolmans
- 2021: Tibco–Silicon Valley Bank
- 2022–2023: Liv Racing TeqFind

Eva Buurman (born 7 September 1994) is a Dutch professional racing cyclist, who last rode for UCI Women's WorldTeam Liv Racing TeqFind. Before turning to professional cycling, Buurman was a speed skater.

== Major results ==
2015
6th Erondegemse Pijl
9th Parel van de Veluwe
2017
3rd Trofee Maarten Wynants
5th Diamond Tour
6th Grand Prix de Plumelec-Morbihan Dames
7th La Classique Morbihan
7th Erondegemse Pijl
2018
7th Overall Ladies Tour of Norway
8th Overall The Women's Tour

== See also ==
- List of 2016 UCI Women's Teams and riders
