= Vitalogic Astrokalb Radunion Nö =

Former Austrian professional women's cycling team

Team information
- Registered: Austria
- Founded: 2014
- Disbanded: 2016
- Discipline: Road
- Status: UCI Women's Team

Key personnel
- General manager: Heribert Springnagel; Ernst Schilling

Team name history
- 2014–2015 2016: No Radunion Vitalogic; Vitalogic Astrokalb Radunion Nö

Vitalogic Astrokalb Radunion Nö (UCI code NOE) was a professional women's cycling team, based in Austria, which competed in elite road bicycle racing events such as the UCI Women's Road World Cup in 2014. Its title sponsors were Niederösterreichische RadUnion (Lower Austrian Cycling Union) and Vitalogic, a supplier of dietary supplements.

== National champions ==
2016
Slovakia Time Trial, Lucia Valachová
Austria Road Race, Christina Perchtold

== Roster ==
Roster in 2016:

- Anna Badegruber (AUT)
- Nathalie Birli (AUT)
- Lisa Lackner (AUT)
- Elise Maes (LUX)
- Christina Perchtold (AUT)
- Amber Pierce (USA)
- Sandra Reisenhofer (AUT)
- Lucia Valachová (SVK)
- Elena Valentini (ITA)
