= Madison Campbell (cyclist) =

New Zealand cyclist

Personal information
- Born: 12 August 1995 (age 31)

Cycling career
- Sport: Cycling
- Role: Rider

Madison Campbell (born 12 August 1995) is a New Zealand professional racing cyclist who rides for Servetto Footon.

== See also ==
- List of 2016 UCI Women's Teams and riders
