= April Tacey =

British cyclist

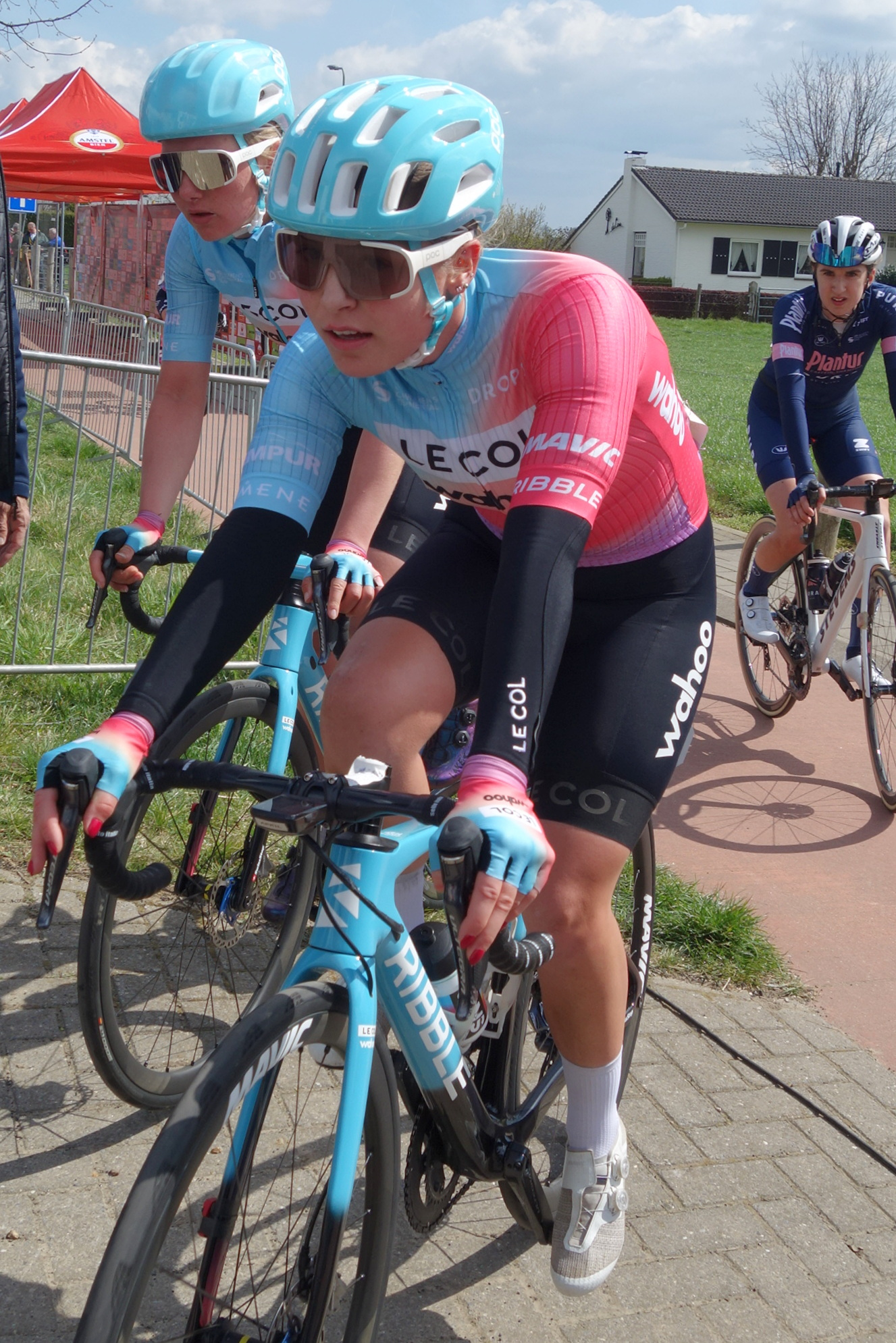
- April Tacey na de Amstel Gold Race 2022

Personal information
- Born: 12 October 2000 (age 26) Leicester, England

Cycling career
- Sport: Cycling
- Current team: Team Coop–Repsol

Professional teams
- 2020: Drops Cycling Team
- 2021: Drops-Le Col
- 2022: Le Col-Wahoo
- 2023: Lifeplus–Wahoo
- 2024–2025: Team Coop–Repsol

April Tacey (born 12 October 2000 in Leicester, England) is an English professional racing cyclist from Leicester who currently rides for Team Coop–Repsol.

== Career ==
In 2017, Tacey was a member of the British Junior team. In 2019, she rode for Elite-2 team Brother UK - Fusion RT. From 2020, she rode for Drops Cycling Team, which continued as Drops-Le Col in 2021, in 2022 as Le Col-Wahoo and in 2023 as Lifeplus–Wahoo.

In July 2020, Tacey won the first and fourth stages of the virtual Tour de France.

== Palmares ==
2025
Omloop der Kempen

== Teams ==
- 2020 – (United Kingdom) Drops Cycling Team
- 2021 – (United Kingdom) Drops - Le Col s/b TEMPUR.
- 2022 – (United Kingdom) Le Col-Wahoo
- 2023 – (United Kingdom) Lifeplus–Wahoo
- 2024 – (Norway) Team Coop–Repsol
- 2025 – (Norway) Team Coop–Repsol
