= Laura Massey =

British cyclist

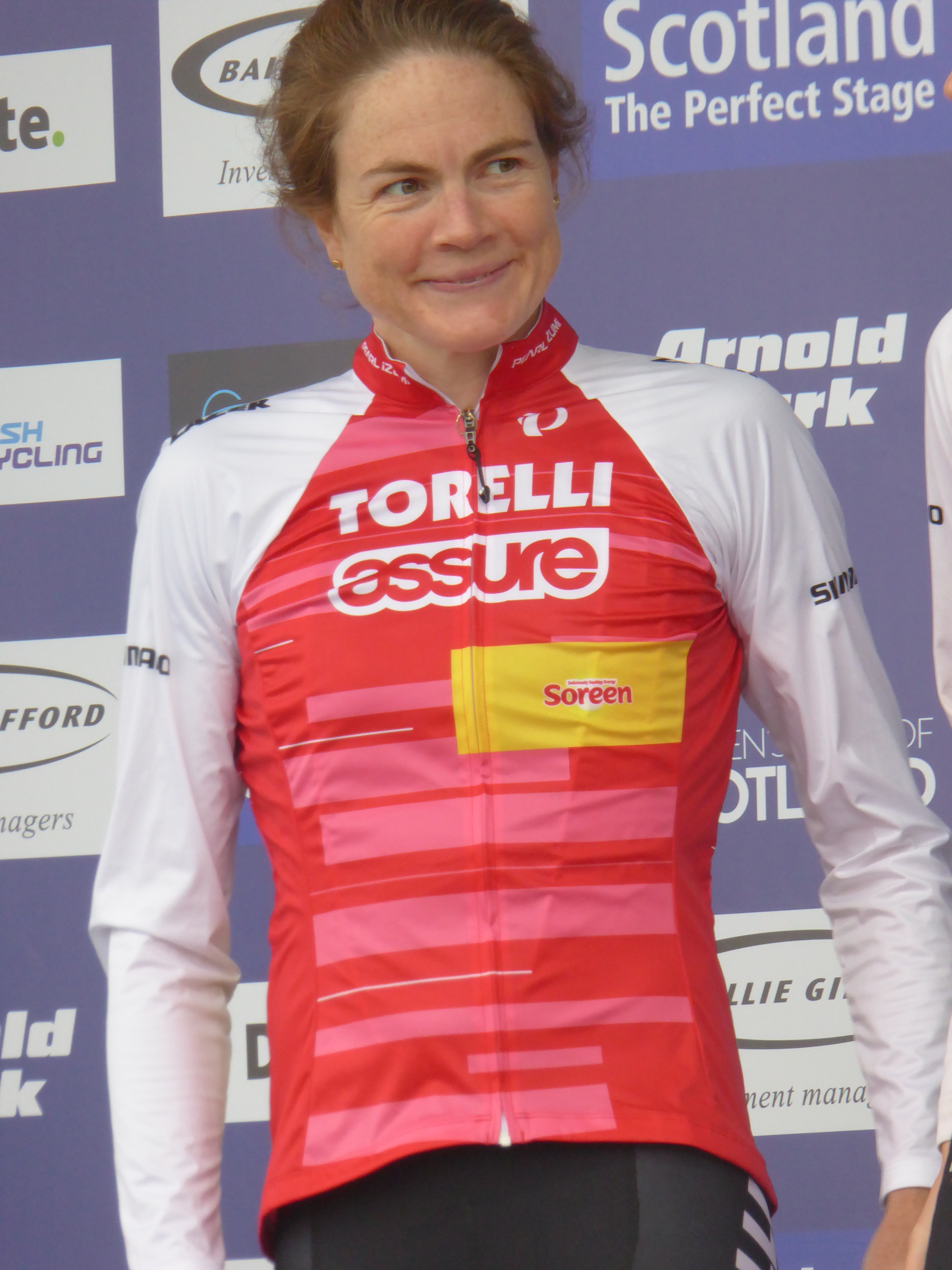
- Massey at the 2019 Women's Tour of Scotland

Personal information
- Born: 1 September 1981 (age 45)

Cycling career
- Sport: Cycling
- Discipline: Road
- Role: Rider

Amateur teams
- 2012–2013: Abergavenny Road Club
- 2014–2015: Ikon–Mazda
- 2018–2019: Torelli–Beastwear–Brother
- 2022: Histon & Impington Bicycle Club

Professional team
- 2016–2017: Drops

Laura Massey (born 1 September 1981) is a British racing cyclist, who most recently rode for British amateur team Histon & Impington Bicycle Club. She took a six-month break from her day job in pharmaceutical consultancy to prepare for the 2016 UCI Road World Championships.

== See also ==
- List of 2016 UCI Women's Teams and riders
