= Pro Cycling Team Fanini =

Cycling team

Team information
- UCI code: CZG (2017); CZF (2018–2020)
- Registered: Albania
- Founded: 2017
- Disbanded: 2020
- Discipline: Road
- Status: UCI Women (2017–)
- Bicycles: Guerciotti

Key personnel
- General manager: Grazia Romano
- Team manager: Manuel Fanini

Team name history
- 2017 2018–2019 2020: Conceria Zabri–Fanini–Guerciotti; Conceria Zabri–Fanini; Pro Cycling Team Fanini
Pro Cycling Team Fanini jersey
Jersey

Pro Cycling Team Fanini was a cycling team founded in 2017, that was based in Albania and registered as a UCI Women's Team.

== Team roster ==
As of 8 July 2019.

Rider	Date of birth
Lisa Allkokondi (ALB)	17 May 1995 (age 31)
Simona Bortolotti (ITA)	6 December 1994 (age 31)
Sofia Cilenti (ITA)	20 January 1995 (age 31)
Lisa De Ranieri (ITA)	30 July 1997 (age 29)
Keti Fetishi (ALB)	15 April 1997 (age 29)
Silvia Folloni (ITA)	21 June 1995 (age 31)
Leonora Geppi (ITA)	9 December 1999 (age 26)
Joli Karafili (ALB)	6 October 1995 (age 30)

Rider	Date of birth
Xhorxhia Kristollari (ALB)	2 May 1995 (age 31)
Xhejna Metalja (ALB)	6 February 1997 (age 29)
Claudia Meucci (ITA)	22 January 1999 (age 27)
Loreta Pirro (ALB)	15 November 1997 (age 28)
Jona Rizvanolli (ALB)	2 May 1992 (age 34)
Elona Rusta (ALB)	3 September 1996 (age 30)
Basei Marzia Salton (ITA)	7 July 1997 (age 29)

== Major results ==
2018
Stage 1 (ITT) Giro della Campania in Rosa, Elena Franchi
Young rider classification Giro Toscana Int. Femminile - Memorial Michela Fanini, Elena Franchi

== National champions ==
2017
Ukraine Time Trial, Yevgenia Vysotska
Ukraine Road Race, Yevgenia Vysotska
