= Simona Bortolotti =

Italian cyclist (born 1994)

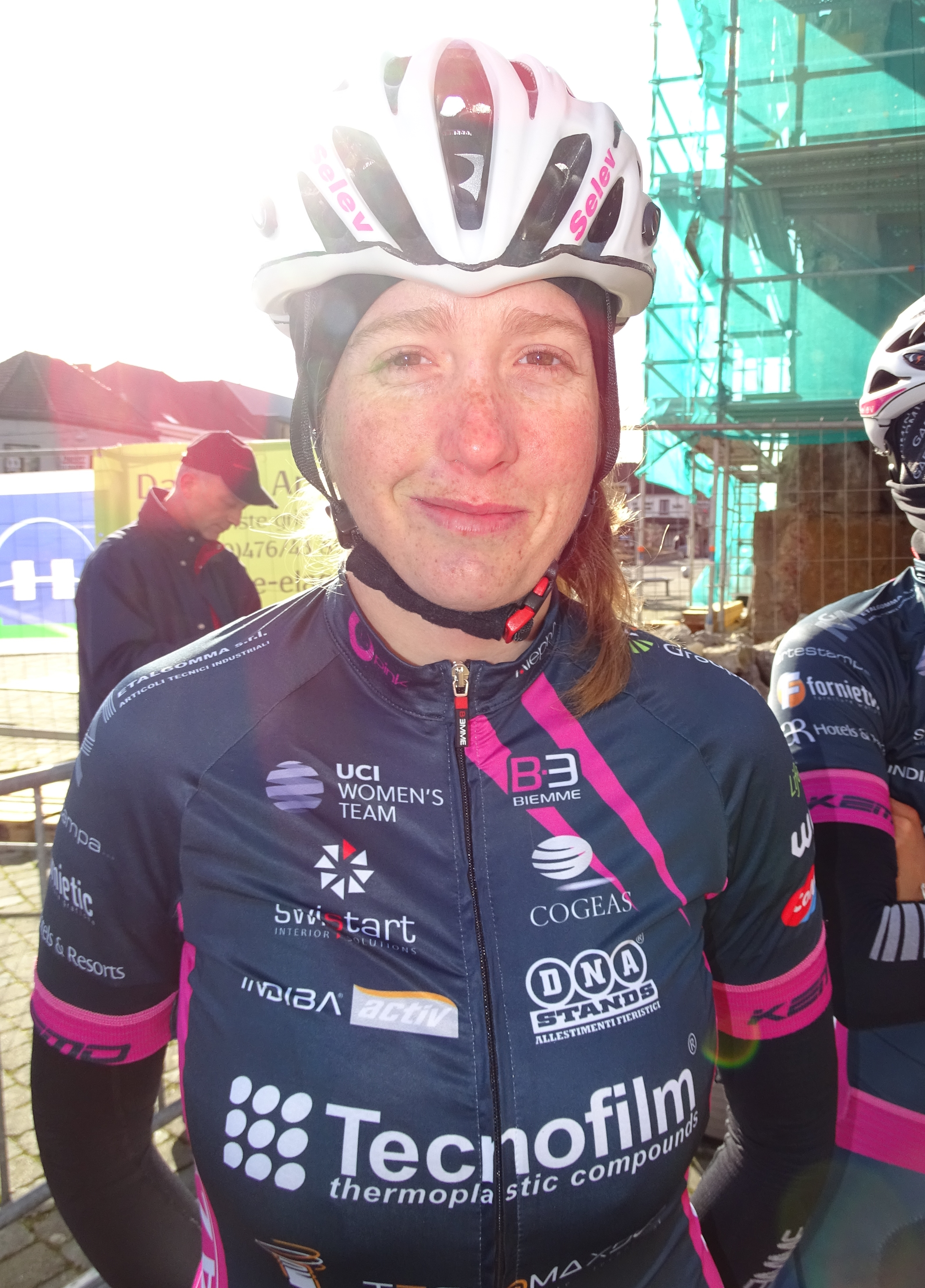
- Bortolotti in 2016.

Personal information
- Full name: Simona Bortolotti
- Born: 6 December 1994 (age 31)

Cycling career
- Sport: Cycling
- Current team: Pro Cycling Team Fanini
- Discipline: Road
- Role: Rider

Professional teams
- 2013–2014: Servetto Footon
- 2015–2016: BePink–La Classica
- 2017: Giusfredi–Bianchi
- 2019–: Conceria Zabri–Fanini

Simona Bortolotti (born 6 December 1994) is an Italian professional racing cyclist, who currently rides for UCI Women's Team Pro Cycling Team Fanini.

== See also ==
- List of 2015 UCI Women's Teams and riders
