= Anna Christian =

Manx cyclist

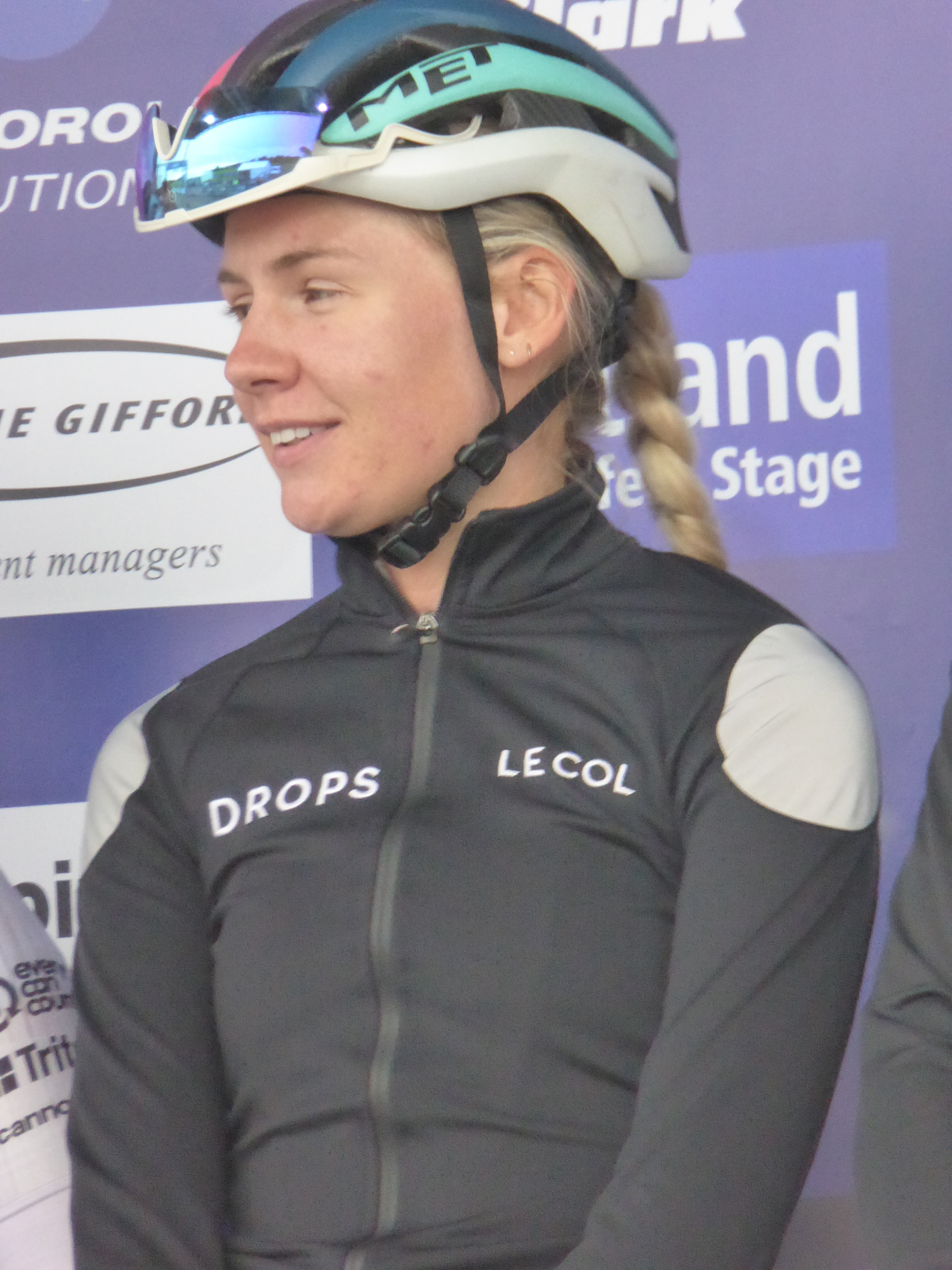
- Christian at the 2019 Women's Tour of Scotland

Personal information
- Full name: Anna Elizabeth Christian
- Born: 6 August 1995 (age 31) Douglas, Isle of Man

Cycling career
- Sport: Cycling
- Current team: Retired
- Discipline: Road
- Role: Rider

Amateur team
- 2013–2014: Scott Contessa Epic

Professional teams
- 2015–2016: Wiggle–Honda
- 2017–2022: Drops

Anna Elizabeth Christian (born 6 August 1995) is a Manx former racing cyclist, who competed professionally between 2015 and 2022 for UCI Women's Teams Wiggle High5 and Le Col–Wahoo. She rode at the 2014 UCI Road World Championships for Great Britain, and competed for the Isle of Man at three Commonwealth Games between 2014 and 2022.

Christian became British Junior Road Race Champion in 2013. In October 2014 it was announced that she would join the Wiggle–Honda team in 2015. At the 2017 Tour of Wolds, which was part of the National Women's road series, Christian finished second. In 2017 she won the inaugural women's under-23 British National Time Trial Championships on home soil on the Isle of Man.

== Personal life ==
She is the sister of fellow racing cyclist Mark Christian.

== Major results ==
2013
1st Road race, National Junior Road Championships
2017
1st Time trial, National Under-23 Road Championships
2nd Tour of the Wolds
2018
9th Time trial, Commonwealth Games
