= Sophie Coleman =

English triathlete

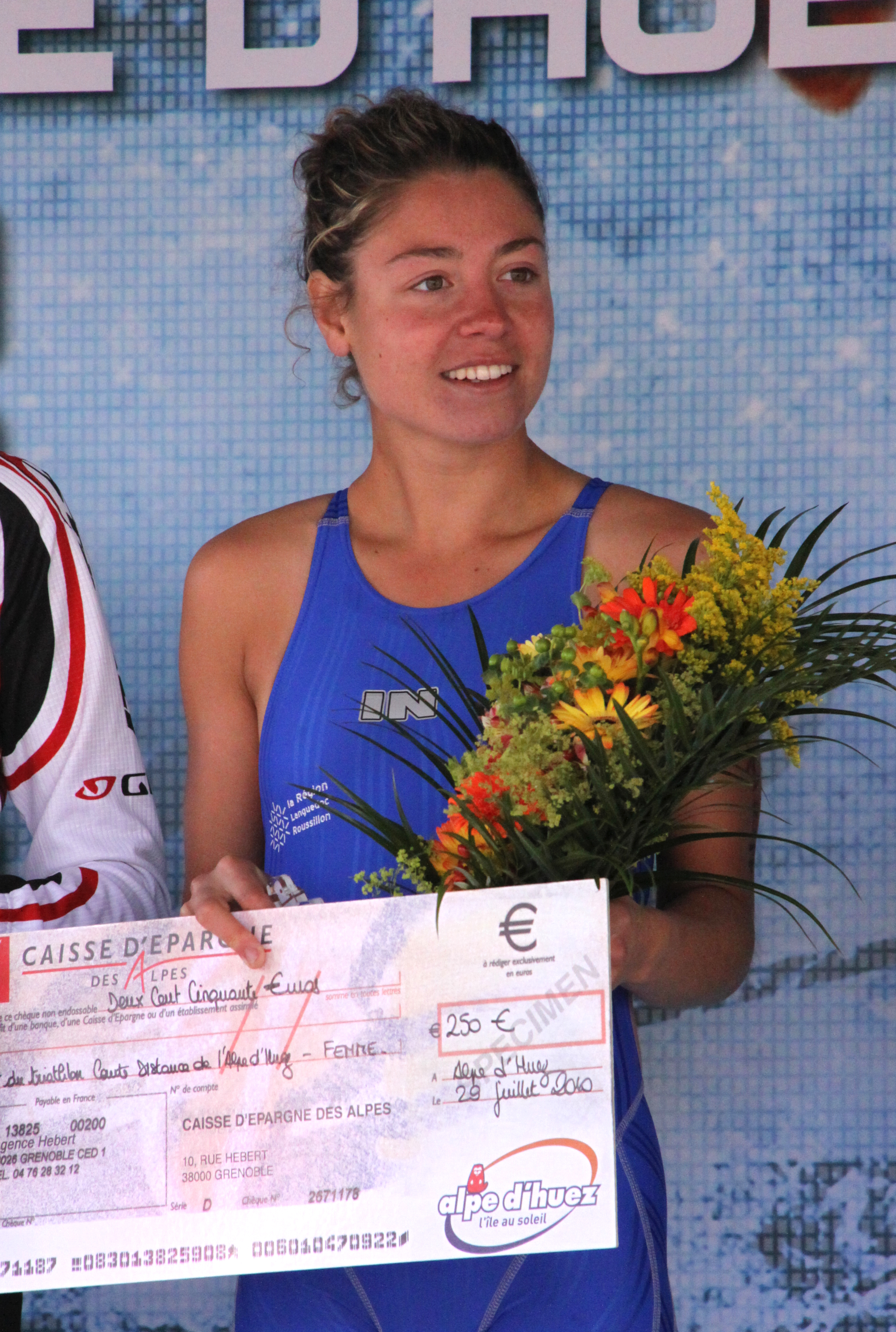
Sophie Coleman with the Alpe d'Huez bronze medal, 2010.

Sophie Coleman (born 12 August 1990 in Brighton) is an English ex-professional triathlete, Junior Duathlon World Champion of the years 2008 and 2009, U23 Duathlon World Champion of the year 2010, Junior Duathlon European Champion of the year 2007, and British Junior Triathlon Champion of the years 2008 and 2009.

Trained by GB coach Glen Cook, at the age of 14 at her very first ITU triathlon in Alexandroupolis, Sophie Coleman won the gold medal in the Youth Team category together with Kirsty McWilliams and Jodie Stimpson.

Sophie Coleman has also taken part in numerous national and non ITU triathlons. At the famous Triathlon EDF Alpe d'Huez, for instance, she won the bronze medal on 29 July 2010. In the prestigious French Club Championship Series Lyonnaise des Eaux, Sophie Coleman represented Montpellier Agglo Tri.

Sophie retired from elite sport after her U23 World Duathlon win. She attended Loughborough University 2010-2013 attaining a BA in Fine Art and was one of a selected group of graduates to exhibit work in a group show in Suzhou, China. She returned to the sporting arena in 2015, winning the Mallorca 312 cycle sportive in a record time of 9hrs45, finishing within the top 100 overall. This led her to compete in various road races around the UK and sign to team PMR Joachim House for whom she placed 11th overall in the Rás na mBan stage race in Ireland.

Sophie is now coached by Graham Hill and signed to the new British UCI women's team DROPS for the 2016 race season. She works for and is supported by Oatopia.

== ITU Competitions ==
In the six years from 2005 to 2010 Sophie Coleman took part in 10 ITU competitions and achieved 8 top ten positions, among which 6 medals. The following list is based upon the official ITU rankings and the athlete's ITU Profile Page. Unless indicated otherwise, the following events are triathlons (Olympic Distance) and belong to the Elite category.

Date	Competition	Place	Rank
2005-07-24	European Championships (Youth / Team)	Alexandroupoli(s)	1
2006-07-30	European Cup (Junior)	Salford	DNF
2007-06-16	Duathlon European Championships (Junior)	Edinburgh	1
2008-09-27	Duathlon World Championships (Junior)	Rimini	1
2009-01-16	Australian Youth Olympic Festival	Sydney	2
2009-07-02	European Championships (Junior)	Holten	5
2009-09-26	Duathlon World Championships (Junior)	Concord	1
2009-10-25	Premium European Cup	Alanya	DNS
2010-04-30	Duathlon European Championships (U23)	Nancy	4
2010-08-15	European Cup	Geneva	30
2010-09-03	Duathlon World Championships (U23)	Edinburgh	1

DNS = did not start · DNF = did not finish
