= Lifeplus–Wahoo =

Cycling team

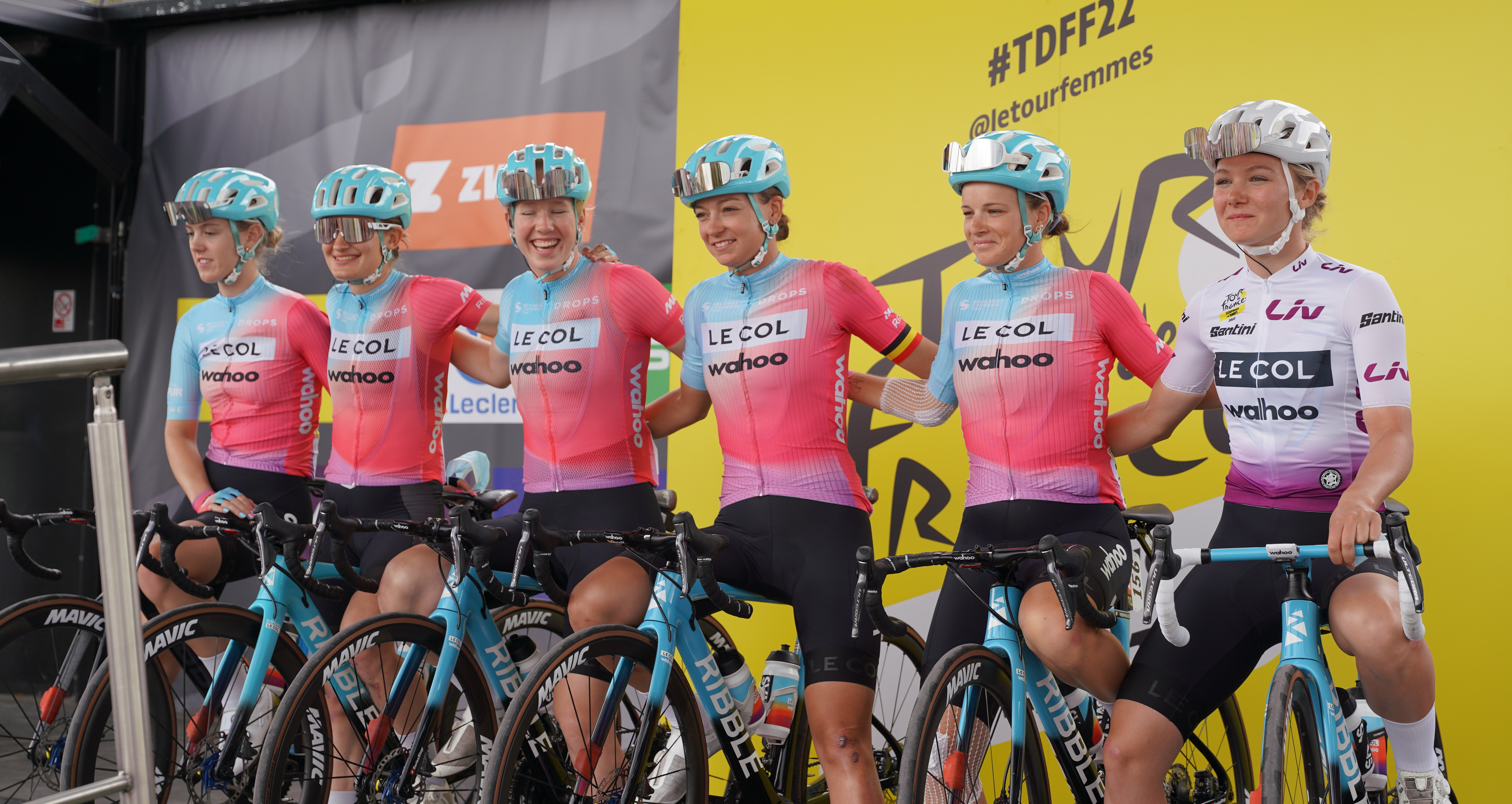
- Riders at the 2022 Tour de France Femmes

Team information
- UCI code: DRP
- Registered: United Kingdom
- Founded: 2015
- Disbanded: 2024
- Discipline: Road
- Status: UCI Women's Continental Team (2020–present)
- Bicycles: Corley Cycles (2015); Trek (2016–2018); Cannondale (2019–2020); Ribble (2021–2024)
- Website: Team home page

Key personnel
- General manager: Tom Varney
- Team managers: Małgorzata Jasińska; Morgan Kneisky

Team name history
- 2015 2016–2017 2018 2019–2020 2021 2022 2023-2024: Corley Cycles–Drops RT; Drops Cycling Team; Trek–Drops; Drops Cycling Team; Drops–Le Col s/b TEMPUR; Le Col–Wahoo; Lifeplus–Wahoo

Lifeplus–Wahoo was a UCI women's cycling team based in the United Kingdom, founded in 2015. The team was jointly sponsored by holistic wellness company Lifeplus and fitness technology company Wahoo. In 2023, the team gained automatic invitations to the UCI Women's World Tour owing to its performance in 2022. The team closed after the 2024 season

== Sponsorship ==
The team was founded in 2015, using Drops branding for the next 6 years. In 2018 Trek Bikes became title sponsors of the team. In 2019 the team reverted to its previous name as Trek ended their sponsorship after one year in order to start their own team. When a prospective replacement sponsor also pulled out the team launched a crowdfunding campaign in order to stay afloat and raised £25,000.

In December 2020 it was announced that the team's clothing supplier Le Col would step up to co-title sponsor for the 2021 season after agreeing to double their investment in the team. They were joined by American mattress and pillow manufacturer TEMPUR. The team confirmed that funding would not go as far as being able to pay a salary to riders, something Drops has always been transparent about its inability to do.

In August 2021 Le Col signed a two-year extension taking their sponsorship through to 2023. In doing so it was announced that they would be trebling their annual investment in the team. It was also announced that the teams tyre supplier Mavic would extend and increase their sponsorship of the team into 2022. In the following weeks the team announced a number of new rider signings and contract renewals with a number of 2 year contracts confirmed for the first time in the team's history. In January 2022 it was announced that Wahoo would become the teams co-title for 2022 with the team being renamed Le Col–Wahoo.

In November 2022, Le Col did not renew their contract, with funding around €400,000 required to keep the team running. Staff and riders were told to look elsewhere for 2023 contracts.

In January 2023, it was announced that holistic wellness company Lifeplus would join the team as title sponsor, with the team becoming Lifeplus–Wahoo. Former professional cyclists Małgorzata Jasińska and Morgan Kneisky joined the team as team managers. Over half of the 2023 roster is aged under 23. Owing to its performance during the 2022 season, the team gains automatic invitations to UCI Women's World Tour events in 2023.

Equipment	Sponsor	Other sponsors
Bikes	Corley Cycles (2015); Trek (2016–2018); Cannondale (2019–2020); Ribble Cycles (2021–)	TEMPUR; LUMENE; Selle Italia; Swiss Stop; WinSleek
Team kit & clothing	Le Col (2019–)	TEMPUR; LUMENE; Selle Italia; Swiss Stop; WinSleek
Wheels	Mavic (2021–)	TEMPUR; LUMENE; Selle Italia; Swiss Stop; WinSleek
Tyres	Continental (2015–)	TEMPUR; LUMENE; Selle Italia; Swiss Stop; WinSleek
Helmets & Glasses	POC (2020–)	TEMPUR; LUMENE; Selle Italia; Swiss Stop; WinSleek
Nutrition	OTE (2016–2019); One Pro Nutrition (2020–2021)	TEMPUR; LUMENE; Selle Italia; Swiss Stop; WinSleek

== Team roster 2023 ==
As of 16 August 2023.

Rider	Date of birth
Natalie Grinczer (GBR)	15 November 1993 (age 32)
Ella Harris (NZL)	18 July 1998 (age 28)
Eluned King (GBR)	1 August 2002 (age 24)
Typhaine Laurance (FRA)	28 August 1998 (age 28)
Maddie Leech (GBR)	4 May 2003 (age 23)
Maria Novolodskaya (RUS)	28 July 1999 (age 27)
Kate Richardson (GBR)	12 September 2002 (age 23)

Rider	Date of birth
Awen Roberts (GBR)	23 February 2005 (age 21)
Kaja Rysz (POL)	10 April 1999 (age 27)
Karin Soderqvist (SWE)	31 July 2003 (age 23)
April Tacey (GBR)	12 October 2000 (age 25)
Babette van der Wolf (NED)	29 April 2004 (age 22)
Margaux Vigie (FRA)	21 July 1995 (age 31)
Ella Wyllie (NZL)	1 September 2002 (age 24)

== Major wins ==
2016
UCI Track Cycling World Cup – Glasgow (Team Pursuit), Eleanor Dickinson
Revolution Series – Manchester (Scratch race), Eleanor Dickinson

2017
Mountains classification Setmana Ciclista Valenciana, Ann-Sophie Duyck

Stage 2, Ann-Sophie Duyck

Provincial Time Trial Championship West-Vlaanderen, Ann-Sophie Duyck
Stage 4 Gracia–Orlová, Martina Ritter
Ljubljana–Domžale–Ljubljana TT, Ann-Sophie Duyck
Stage 3 (ITT) Tour de Feminin-O cenu Českého Švýcarska, Ann-Sophie Duyck
Youth classification 2017 BeNe Ladies Tour, Alice Barnes

Stage 1, Alice Barnes

Stage 2 Tour of the Reservoir, Laura Massey

2018
Youth classification Cadel Evans Great Ocean Road Race, Eva Buurman
Youth classification Setmana Ciclista Valenciana, Abby-Mae Parkinson
Mountains classification Thüringen Rundfahrt der Frauen Kathrin Hammes

2019
Youth classification Giro Toscana Int. Femminile - Memorial Michela Fanini, Lizzie Holden

2021
Overall Tour de Feminin–Krásná Lípa, Joscelin Lowden

Stage 4 Joscelin Lowden

Omloop der Kempen, Maike van der Duin
UCI Track Cycling World Cup – Saint Petersburg (Elimination race), Maria Martins
UCI Track Cycling World Cup – Saint Petersburg (Omnium), Maria Martins

2022
Veenendaal–Veenendaal Classic, Gladys Verhulst

== World & national champions ==
2016
British U23 Road Race, Alice Barnes
British Junior Road Race, Eleanor Dickinson
Antigua & Barbuda Time Trial, Tamiko Butler
Antigua & Barbuda Road Race, Tamiko Butler

2017
Belgium Time Trial, Ann-Sophie Duyck
British U23 Road Race, Alice Barnes
Austria Time Trial, Martina Ritter
Austria Road Race, Martina Ritter

2019
World Track (Scratch race), Elinor Barker

2020
Portugal Track (Points race), Maria Martins
Portugal Track (Scratch race), Maria Martins

2021
Portugal Road Race, Maria Martins
European U23 Track (Scratch race), Maike van der Duin
European U23 Track (Omnium), Maria Martins

2022
British Road Race, Alice Towers

2023
British U23 Time Trial, Madelaine Leech
European U23 Track (Individual Pursuit), Kate Richardson

2024
British National Track (Individual Pursuit), Kate Richardson
