= 2015 UCI Road World Championships – Women's junior road race =

Women's junior road race
2015 UCI Road World Championships
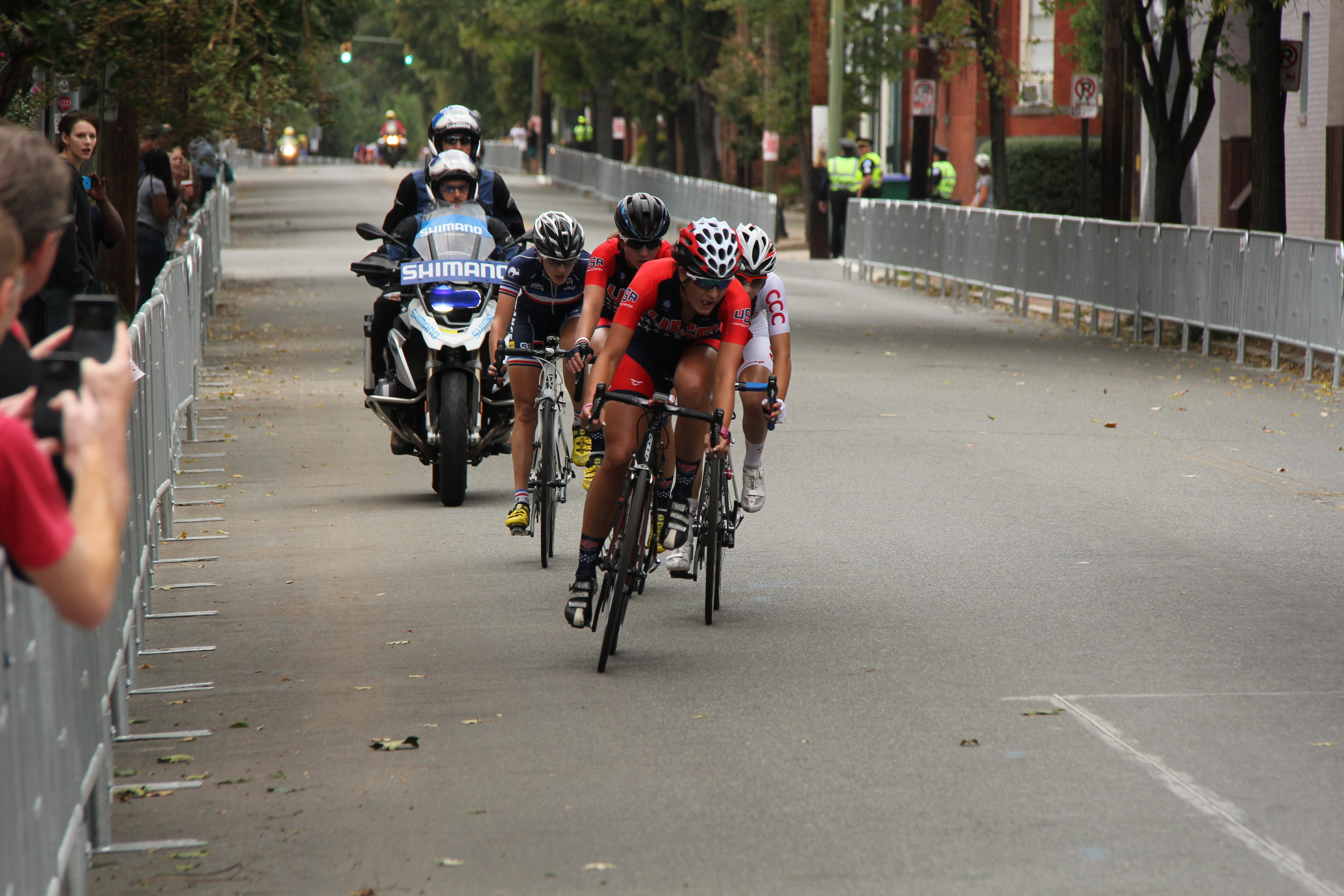
- The medalists in a break away during the race

Race details
- Dates: September 25, 2015
- Stages: 1
- Distance: 64.8 km (40.26 mi)
- Winning time: 1h 42' 16"

Medalists
	Gold	Chloé Dygert (USA)
	Silver	Emma White (USA)
	Bronze	Agnieszka Skalniak (POL)

The Women's junior road race of the 2015 UCI Road World Championships took place in and around Richmond, Virginia, United States on September 25, 2015. The course of the race was 64.8 km (40.3 mi) with the start and finish in Richmond.

As they did in the time trial event, American duo Chloé Dygert and Emma White finished with the gold and silver medals respectively. Dygert won the race by 83 seconds over White, to become the first rider since Nicole Cooke in 2001 to win both junior titles in the same year. The podium was completed by Poland's Agnieszka Skalniak, a further five seconds in arrears.

== Qualification ==
All National Federations were allowed to enter eight riders for the race, with a maximum of four riders to start. In addition to this number, the outgoing World Champion and the current continental champions were also able to take part. The outgoing World Champion, Amalie Dideriksen, did not compete as she was no longer eligible to contest junior races.

Champion	Name
African Champion	Helen Mitchell (RSA)
Pan American Champion	Karen Flores (MEX)
Asian Champion	Yumi Kajihara (JPN)
European Champion	Nadia Quagliotto (ITA)
Oceanian	Kristina Clonan (AUS)

== Course ==
Profile of the road race circuit

The junior women rode four laps on the road race circuit. The length of the circuit was 16.2 km (10.1 mi) and had a total elevation of 103 meters (338 feet). All road races took place on a challenging, technical and inner-city road circuit. The circuit headed west from Downtown Richmond, working its way onto Monument Avenue, a paver-lined, historic boulevard that's been named one of the "10 Great Streets in America". Cyclists took a 180-degree turn at the Jefferson Davis monument and then maneuvered through the Uptown district and Virginia Commonwealth University. Halfway through the circuit, the race headed down into Shockoe Bottom before following the canal and passing Great Shiplock Park, the start of the Virginia Capital Trail. A sharp, off-camber turn at Rocketts Landing brought the riders to the narrow, twisty, cobbled 200 meters (660 feet) climb up to Libby Hill Park in the historic Church Hill neighborhood. A quick descent, followed by three hard turns led to a 100 meters (330 feet) climb up 23rd Street. Once atop this steep cobbled hill, riders descended into Shockoe Bottom. This led them to the final 300 meters (980 feet) climb on Governor Street. At the top, the rider had to take a sharp left turn onto the false-flat finishing straight, 680 meters (2,230 feet) to the finish.

== Schedule ==
All times are in Eastern Daylight Time (UTC−4).

Date	Time	Event
September 25, 2015	10:00–11:50	Women's junior road race

== Participating nations ==
74 cyclists from 28 nations took part in the women's junior road race. The numbers of cyclists per nation is shown in parentheses.

- Australia (2)
- Belgium (4)
- Canada (4)
- Colombia (2)
- Costa Rica (1)
- Czech Republic (1)
- Denmark (1)
- Ecuador (2)
- France (4)
- Germany (4)
- Great Britain (4)
- Ireland (1)
- Italy (5)
- Japan (1)
- Lithuania (1)
- Luxembourg (1)
- Mexico (1)
- Netherlands (4)
- Norway (2)
- New Zealand (3)
- Poland (4)
- Puerto Rico (1)
- Russia (4)
- Spain (4)
- Sweden (3)
- Switzerland (4)
- United States (4) (host)
- Zimbabwe (2)

== Prize money ==
The UCI assigned premiums for the top 3 finishers with a total prize money of €3,450.

Position	1st	2nd	3rd	Total
Amount	€1,533	€1,150	€767	€3,450

== Final classification ==
Of the race's 74 entrants, 67 riders completed the full distance of 64.8 km (40.3 mi).

Rank	Rider	Nation	Time
1st place, gold medalist(s)	Chloé Dygert	United States	1h 42' 16"
2nd place, silver medalist(s)	Emma White	United States	+ 1' 23"
3rd place, bronze medalist(s)	Agnieszka Skalniak	Poland	+ 1' 28"
4	Yumi Kajihara	Japan	+ 1' 41"
5	Susanne Andersen	Norway	+ 1' 41"
6	Elisa Balsamo	Italy	+ 1' 41"
7	Grace Garner	Great Britain	+ 1' 41"
8	Yara Kastelijn	Netherlands	+ 1' 41"
9	Jessica Pratt	Australia	+ 1' 41"
10	Ida Jansson	Sweden	+ 1' 41"
11	Sina Frei	Switzerland	+ 1' 41"
12	Pernille Mathiesen	Denmark	+ 1' 41"
13	Katherine Maine	Canada	+ 1' 41"
14	Juliette Labous	France	+ 1' 41"
15	Karlijn Swinkels	Netherlands	+ 1' 41"
16	Maëlle Grossetête	France	+ 1' 41"
17	Nicole Koller	Switzerland	+ 1' 41"
18	Abby-Mae Parkinson	Great Britain	+ 1' 41"
19	Skylar Schneider	United States	+ 1' 41"
20	Ingvild Gåskjenn	Norway	+ 1' 41"
21	Anna-Leeza Hull	Australia	+ 1' 41"
22	Ksenia Tcymbaliuk	Russia	+ 2' 05"
23	Sofia Bertizzolo	Italy	+ 2' 10"
24	Camila Valbuena	Colombia	+ 2' 16"
25	Nikola Nosková	Czech Republic	+ 2' 36"
26	Rocio García	Spain	+ 2' 50"
27	Ashlyn Woods	United States	+ 3' 45"
28	Lenny Druyts	Belgium	+ 3' 46"
29	Ema Manikaite	Lithuania	+ 3' 46"
30	Katia Ragusa	Italy	+ 3' 46"
31	Maaike Boogaard	Netherlands	+ 3' 46"
32	Fenna Vanhoutte	Belgium	+ 3' 46"
33	Marta Łach	Poland	+ 3' 46"
34	Wiktoria Pikulik	Poland	+ 3' 46"
35	Lizzie Holden	Great Britain	+ 3' 46"
36	Lisa Neumüller	Germany	+ 3' 46"
37	Natalia Studenikina	Russia	+ 3' 46"
38	Christa Riffel	Germany	+ 3' 46"
39	Eleanor Dickinson	Great Britain	+ 3' 46"
40	Liane Lippert	Germany	+ 3' 46"
41	Chiara Zanettin	Italy	+ 3' 46"
42	Gillian Ellsay	Canada	+ 3' 46"
43	Lena Ostler	Germany	+ 3' 46"
44	Hannah Gumbley	New Zealand	+ 3' 46"
45	Nadia Quagliotto	Italy	+ 3' 46"
46	Léna Mettraux	Switzerland	+ 4' 04"
47	Iurani Blanco Calbet	Spain	+ 4' 19"
48	María Calderón	Spain	+ 4' 33"
49	Aafke Soet	Netherlands	+ 7' 14"
50	Paula Patiño	Colombia	+ 7' 14"
51	Aline Seitz	Switzerland	+ 7' 17"
52	Clarie Faber	Luxembourg	+ 7' 17"
53	Georgia Catterick	New Zealand	+ 7' 17"
54	Typhaine Laurance	France	+ 7' 27"
55	Marion Borras	France	+ 7' 28"
56	Mikayla Harvey	New Zealand	+ 7' 28"
57	Kristina Selina	Russia	+ 7' 28"
58	Ciara Doogan	Ireland	+ 7' 31"
59	Skye Davidson	Zimbabwe	+ 7' 45"
60	Anna Gabrielle Traxler	Canada	+ 7' 54"
61	Eva Maria Palm	Belgium	+ 8' 27"
62	Daria Chechneva	Russia	+ 11' 38"
63	Dayana Paspuezan	Ecuador	+ 11' 38"
64	Ana Suárez	Ecuador	+ 11' 43"
65	Julyn Águila	Mexico	+ 14' 42"
66	Emeliah Harvie	Canada	+ 15' 25"
67	Selma Svarf	Sweden	+ 17' 14"
	Daria Pikulik	Poland	DNF
	Teresa Ripoll	Spain	DNF
	Helen Mitchell	Zimbabwe	DNF
	Diana Ramos-Santiago	Puerto Rico	DNF
	Alyson Chévez	Costa Rica	DNF
	Frida Knutsson	Sweden	DNF
	Nathalie Bex	Belgium	DNF
