= 2015 UCI Road World Championships – Women's junior time trial =

Women's junior time trial
2015 UCI Road World Championships
- Time trial Rainbow jersey

Race details
- Dates: September 21, 2015
- Stages: 1
- Distance: 15.0 km (9.321 mi)
- Winning time: 20' 18.47"

Medalists
| | Gold | Chloé Dygert (USA) |
| | Silver | Emma White (USA) |
| | Bronze | Anna-Leeza Hull (AUS) |

The Women's junior time trial of the 2015 UCI Road World Championships took place in and around in Richmond, Virginia, United States on September 21, 2015. The course of the race was 15.0 km (9.3 mi) with the start and finish in Richmond.

American riders finished first and second, as Chloé Dygert won the gold medal by over a minute ahead of Emma White. For the second year in a row, Anna-Leeza Hull finished with the bronze medal, almost 90 seconds down on Dygert's time.

== Qualification ==
All National Federations were allowed to enter four riders for the race, with a maximum of two riders to start. In addition to this number the current continental champions were also able to take part. The outgoing World Champion, Macey Stewart, did not compete as she was no longer eligible to contest junior races.

| Champion | Name | Note |
|---|---|---|
| African Champion | Frances Du Toit (RSA) | Did not participate |
| Asian Champion | Yumi Kajihara (JPN) | |
| Pan American Champion | Camila Valbuena (COL) | |
| European Champion | Agnieszka Skalniak (POL) | |
| Oceanian Champion | Anna-Leeza Hull (AUS) | |

== Course ==
The individual time trial was contested on a circuit of 15 km (9.3 mi) and has a total elevation of 96 meters (315 feet). The junior women rode two laps of the circuit.

The circuit was a technical course that went through the city of Richmond. From the start, the route headed west from downtown to Monument Avenue, a paver-lined, historic boulevard that's been named one of the "10 Great Streets in America." From there, the course made a 180-degree turn at N. Davis Avenue and continued in the opposite direction. The race then cut through the Uptown district before coming back through Virginia Commonwealth University and then crossing the James River. After a technical turnaround, the race came back across the river and worked its way through downtown Richmond, eventually heading up to ascend 300 meters (980 feet) on Governor Street. At the top, the riders had to take a sharp left turn onto the false-flat finishing straight, 680 meters (2,230 feet) to the finish.

== Schedule ==
All times are in Eastern Daylight Time (UTC−4).

| Date | Time | Event |
|---|---|---|
| September 21, 2015 | 10:00–11:10 | Women's junior time trial |

== Participating nations ==
37 cyclists from 25 nations took part in the women's junior time trial. The numbers of cyclists per nation is shown in parentheses.

- Australia (1)
- Belgium (2)
- Canada (2)
- Colombia (1)
- Czech Republic (1)
- Denmark (1)
- Ecuador (1)
- France (2)
- Germany (1)
- Great Britain (2)
- Ireland (1)
- Italy (2)
- Japan (1)
- Lithuania (1)
- Netherlands (2)
- Norway (2)
- New Zealand (1)
- Poland (2)
- Puerto Rico (1)
- Russia (2)
- Spain (2)
- Sweden (2)
- Switzerland (1)
- United States (2) (host)
- Zimbabwe (1)

== Final classification ==
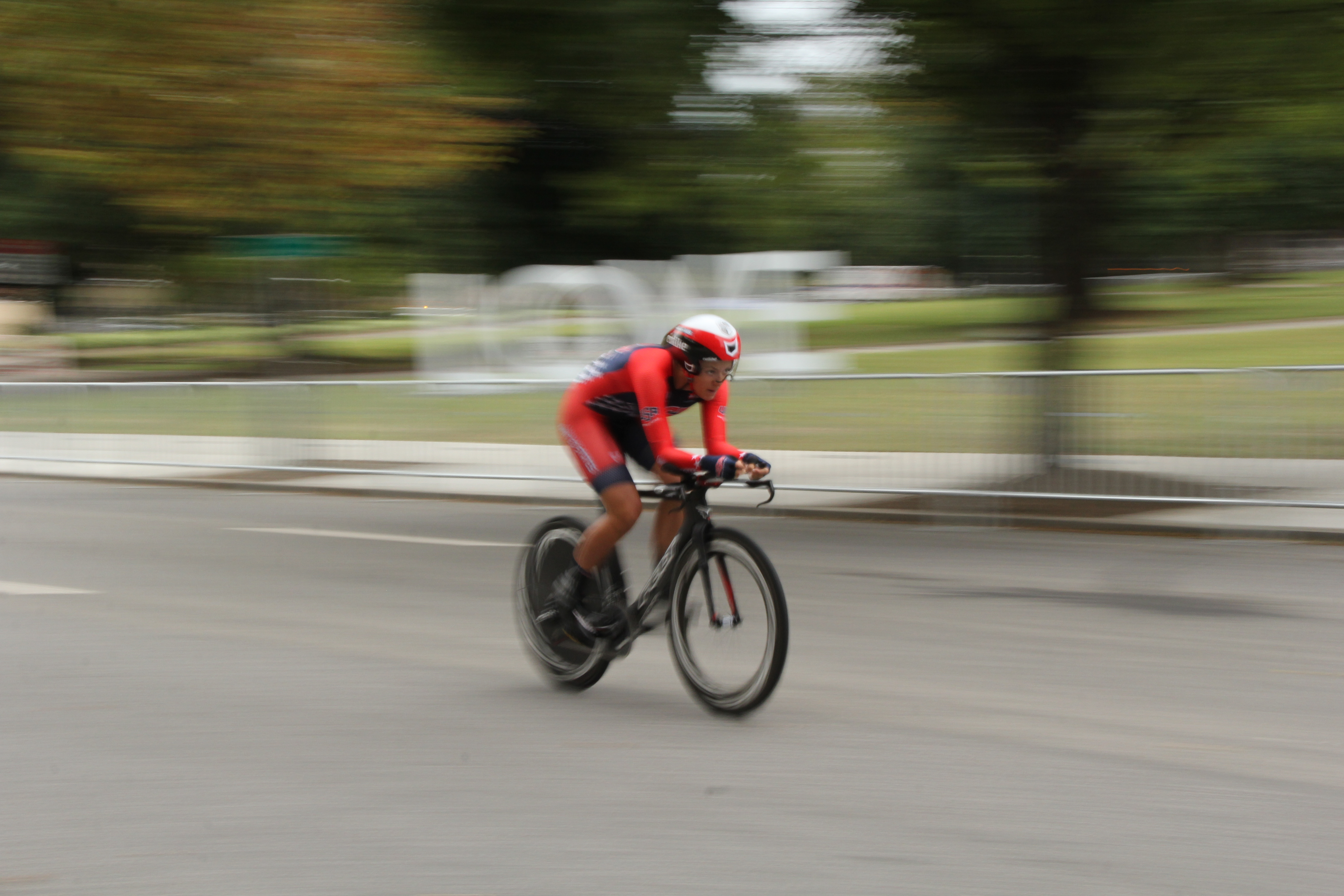
Chloé Dygert won the gold medal

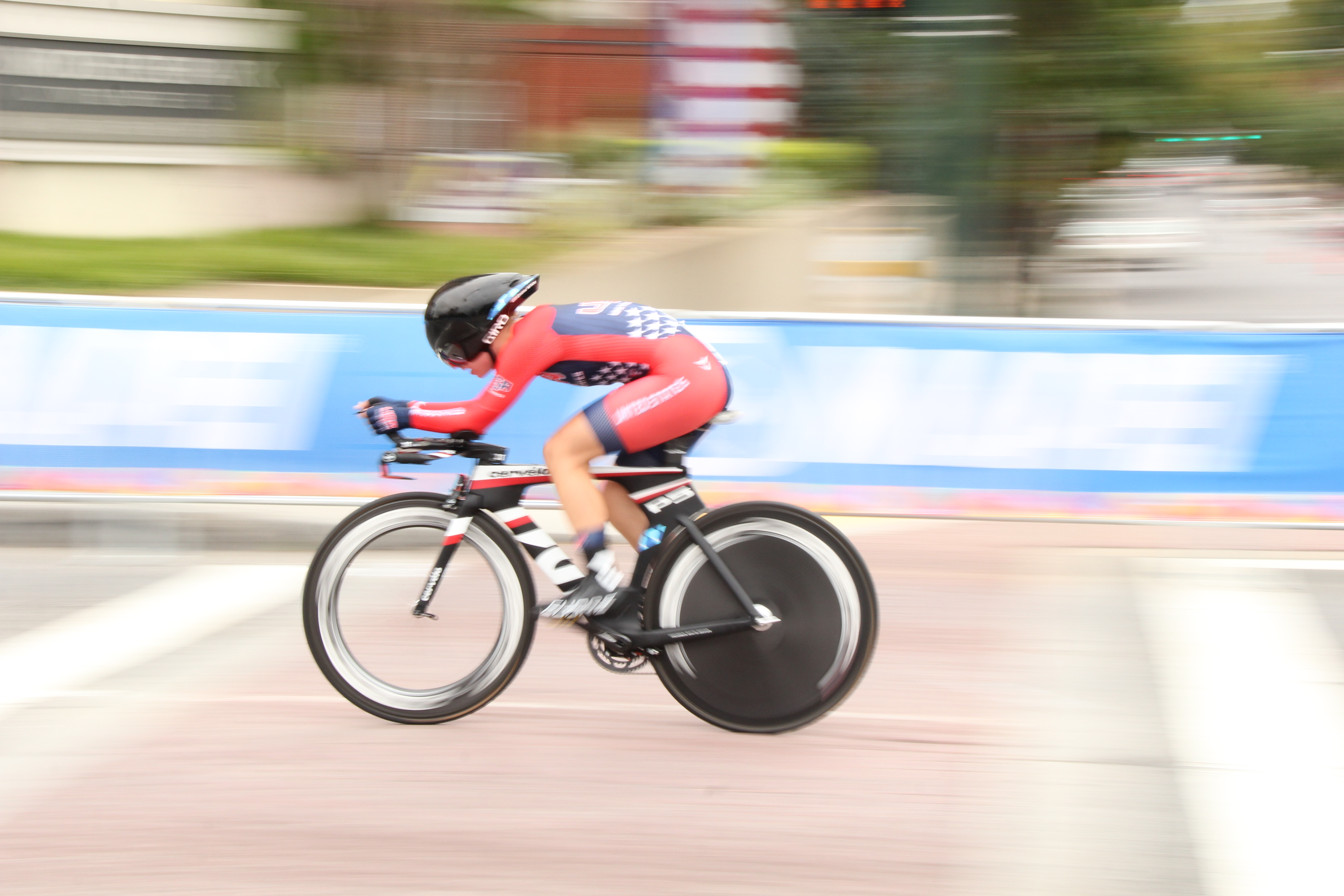
Emma White won the silver medal

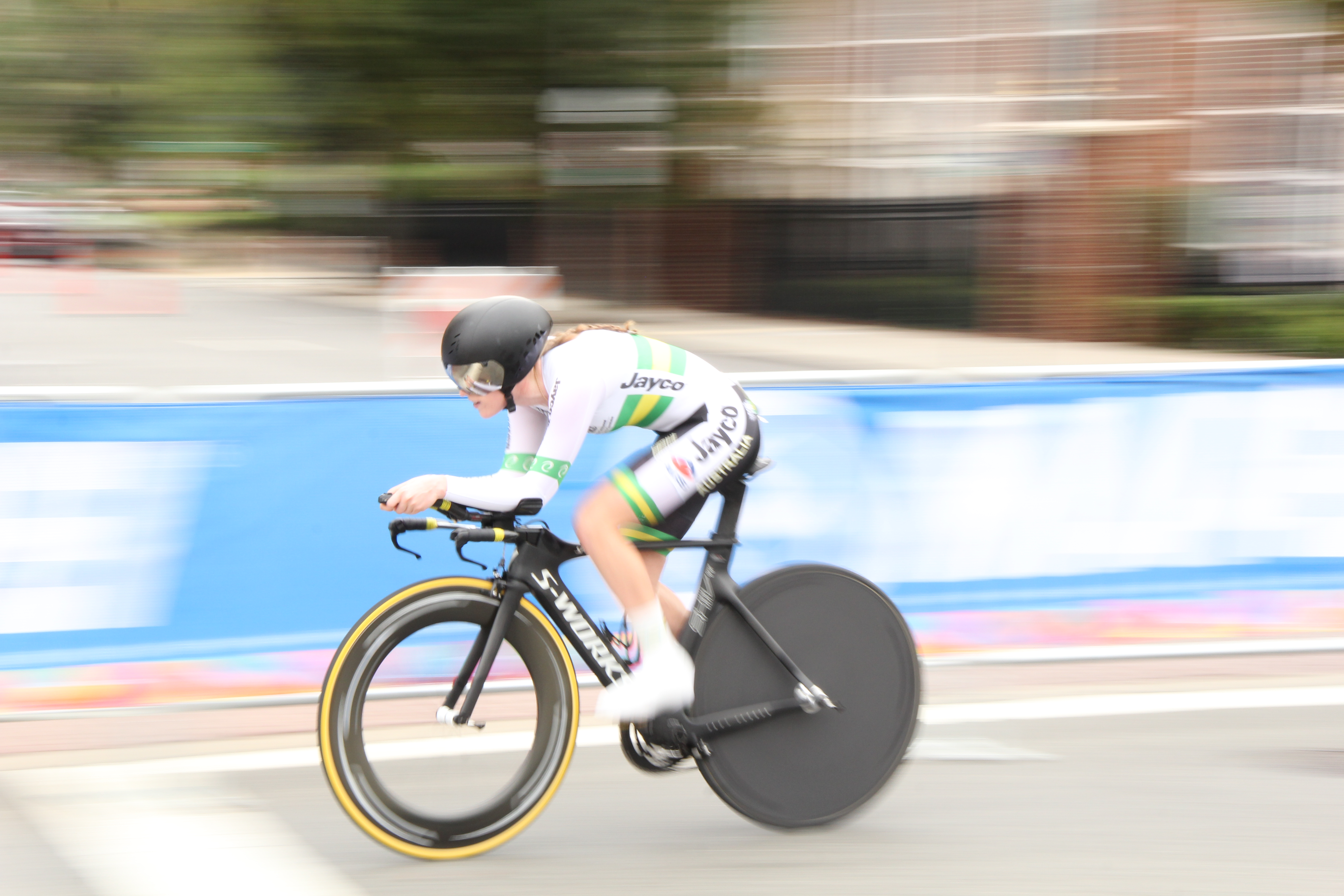
Anna-Leeza Hull won the bronze medal

| Rank | Rider | Time |
|---|---|---|
| 1st place, gold medalist(s) | (United States) Chloé Dygert (USA) | 20' 18.47" |
| 2nd place, silver medalist(s) | (United States) Emma White (USA) | + 1' 05.53" |
| 3rd place, bronze medalist(s) | (Australia) Anna-Leeza Hull (AUS) | + 1' 26.08" |
| 4 | (Denmark) Pernille Mathiesen (DEN) | + 1' 30.41" |
| 5 | (France) Juliette Labous (FRA) | + 1' 35.96" |
| 6 | (Netherlands) Aafke Soet (NED) | + 1' 40.67" |
| 7 | (Poland) Daria Pikulik (POL) | + 1' 41.06" |
| 8 | (Canada) Gillian Ellsay (CAN) | + 1' 45.17" |
| 9 | (Poland) Agnieszka Skalniak (POL) | + 1' 47.51" |
| 10 | (Canada) Emeliah Harvie (CAN) | + 1' 49.51" |
| 11 | (Japan) Yumi Kajihara (JPN) | + 1' 54.52" |
| 12 | (Colombia) Camila Valbuena (COL) | + 1' 56.84" |
| 13 | (Russia) Natalia Studenikina (RUS) | + 2' 02.48" |
| 14 | (Netherlands) Yara Kastelijn (NED) | + 2' 02.97" |
| 15 | (Czech Republic) Nikola Nosková (CZE) | + 2' 03.33" |
| 16 | (Switzerland) Aline Seitz (SUI) | + 2' 05.12" |
| 17 | (Italy) Lisa Morzenti (ITA) | + 2' 07.63" |
| 18 | (France) Marion Borras (FRA) | + 2' 13.67" |
| 19 | (Norway) Susanne Andersen (NOR) | + 2' 13.77" |
| 20 | (Sweden) Ida Jansson (SWE) | + 2' 14.35" |
| 21 | (Russia) Ksenia Tcjmbaliuk (RUS) | + 2' 14.85" |
| 22 | (Italy) Sofia Bertizzolo (ITA) | + 2' 22.45" |
| 23 | (United Kingdom) Abby-Mae Parkinson (GBR) | + 2' 22.53" |
| 24 | (New Zealand) Georgia Catterick (NZL) | + 2' 27.40" |
| 25 | (Sweden) Frida Knutsson (SWE) | + 2' 30.32" |
| 26 | (Lithuania) Ema Manikaite (LTU) | + 2' 34.69" |
| 27 | (Belgium) Eva Maria Palm (BEL) | + 2' 39.95" |
| 28 | (Republic of Ireland) Ciara Doogan (IRL) | + 2' 46.02" |
| 29 | (Spain) María Calderón (ESP) | + 3' 02.70" |
| 30 | (Belgium) Nathalie Bex (BEL) | + 3' 03.23" |
| 31 | (United Kingdom) Lizzie Holden (GBR) | + 3' 06.81" |
| 32 | (Norway) Ingvild Gaskjenn (NOR) | + 3' 07.02" |
| 33 | (Ecuador) Ana Suárez (ECU) | + 3' 42.21" |
| 34 | (Spain) Teresa Ripoll (ESP) | + 4' 14.03" |
| 35 | (Puerto Rico) Diana Ramos (PUR) | + 4' 35.34" |
| 36 | (Zimbabwe) Helen Mitchell (ZIM) | + 5' 00.04" |
| 37 | (Germany) Christa Riffel (GER) | + 5' 22.52" |
