= 2014 UCI Road World Championships – Women's junior time trial =

Women's junior time trial
2014 UCI Road World Championships
- Time trial Rainbow jersey

Race details
- Dates: 22 September 2014
- Stages: 1
- Distance: 13.90 km (8.64 mi)
- Winning time: 20' 08.39"

Medalists
	Gold	Macey Stewart (AUS)
	Silver	Pernille Mathiesen (DEN)
	Bronze	Anna-Leeza Hull (AUS)

The Women's junior time trial of the 2014 UCI Road World Championships took place in and around Ponferrada, Spain on 22 September 2014. The course of the race was 13.90 km (8.64 mi) with the start and finish in Ponferrada.

The world title was won by Australian rider Macey Stewart, who became the fourth Australian rider to win the event. Stewart won the gold medal by 10.79 seconds ahead of Denmark's Pernille Mathiesen, while the bronze medal went to Australia's Anna-Leeza Hull – 13.31 seconds in arrears of Stewart – after edging out a third Australian rider, Alexandra Manly, by half a second.

== Qualification ==
All National Federations were allowed to enter four riders for the race, with a maximum of two riders to start. In addition to this number the current continental champions were also able to take part. The outgoing World Champion, Séverine Eraud, did not compete as she was no longer eligible to contest junior races.

Champion	Name
Pan American Champion	Camila Valbuena (COL)
Asian Champion	Yekaterina Yuraitis (KAZ)
European Champion	Aafke Soet (NED)
Oceanian Champion	Alexandra Manly (AUS)

== Schedule ==
All times are in Central European Time (UTC+1).

Date	Time	Event
22 September 2014	10:00–11:30	Women's junior time trial
22 September 2014	11:50	Victory ceremony

== Participating nations ==
49 cyclists from 29 nations took part in the women's junior time trial. The numbers of cyclists per nation is shown in parentheses.

- Australia (3)
- Belgium (1)
- Canada (1)
- Colombia (2)
- Czech Republic (1)
- Denmark (1)
- Egypt (2)
- Estonia (1)
- France (2)
- Germany (2)
- (United Kingdom) Great Britain (2)
- (Republic of Ireland) Ireland (1)
- Italy (2)
- Japan (2)
- Kazakhstan (2)
- Latvia (1)
- Lithuania (2)
- Mauritius (1)
- Netherlands (3)
- Poland (2)
- Russia (2)
- Slovakia (1)
- Slovenia (1)
- South Africa (2)
- Spain (2) (host)
- Sweden (2)
- Switzerland (2)
- United States (2)
- Uzbekistan (1)

== Prize money ==
The UCI assigned premiums for the top 3 finishers with a total prize money of €1,380.

Position	1st	2nd	3rd	Total
Amount	€767	€383	€230	€1,380

== Final classification ==
Rank	Rider	Time
1	(Australia) Macey Stewart (AUS)	20' 08.39"
2	(Denmark) Pernille Mathiesen (DEN)	+ 10.79"
3	(Australia) Anna-Leeza Hull (AUS)	+ 13.31"
4	(Australia) Alexandra Manly (AUS)	+ 13.81"
5	(United States) Emma White (USA)	+ 26.47"
6	(France) Gréta Richioud (FRA)	+ 26.63"
7	(United Kingdom) Mel Lowther (GBR)	+ 27.69"
8	(Netherlands) Aafke Soet (NED)	+ 28.23"
9	(Poland) Daria Pikulik (POL)	+ 38.91"
10	(Russia) Daria Egorova (RUS)	+ 44.73"
11	(Colombia) Camila Valbuena (COL)	+ 50.05"
12	(Germany) Lisa Klein (DEU)	+ 51.87"
13	(Italy) Alice Gasparini (ITA)	+ 52.45"
14	(Italy) Sofia Bertizzolo (ITA)	+ 55.51"
15	(United States) Janelle Cole (USA)	+ 1' 02.21"
16	(Lithuania) Milda Aužbikavičiūtė (LTU)	+ 1' 06.86"
17	(Kazakhstan) Yekaterina Yuraitis (KAZ)	+ 1' 08.07"
18	(Poland) Natalia Radzicka (POL)	+ 1' 08.78"
19	(Japan) Kiyoka Sakaguchi (JPN)	+ 1' 08.81"
20	(Kazakhstan) Faina Potapova (KAZ)	+ 1' 10.48"
21	(Netherlands) Chanella Stougje (NED)	+ 1' 10.51"
22	(Spain) Maria Calderón (ESP)	+ 1' 14.95"
23	(Germany) Franziska Banzer (DEU)	+ 1' 15.92"
24	(France) Margot Dutour (FRA)	+ 1' 16.11"
25	(Sweden) Julia Karlsson (SWE)	+ 1' 20.44"
26	(Netherlands) Jeanne Korevaar (NED)	+ 1' 22.26"
27	(Czech Republic) Nikola Zdráhalová (CZE)	+ 1' 22.31"
28	(Sweden) Linda Halleröd (SWE)	+ 1' 25.85"
29	(Slovakia) Tereza Medveďová (SVK)	+ 1' 29.46"
30	(Switzerland) Aline Seitz (SUI)	+ 1' 29.71"
31	(Belgium) Eva Maria Palm (BEL)	+ 1' 29.95"
32	(Lithuania) Ema Manikaitė (LTU)	+ 1' 33.97"
33	(Canada) Dafne Theroux-Izquierdo (CAN)	+ 1' 35.81"
34	(Switzerland) Michelle Andres (SUI)	+ 1' 39.82"
35	(Estonia) Mari-Liis Mõttus (EST)	+ 1' 41.87"
36	(Russia) Anastasiia Pliaskina (RUS)	+ 1' 43.77"
37	(Republic of Ireland) Josie Knight (IRL)	+ 1' 45.84"
38	(Spain) Julia Rodríguez (ESP)	+ 1' 46.17"
39	(Japan) Yumi Kajihara (JPN)	+ 1' 50.41"
40	(Colombia) Paula Patiño (COL)	+ 1' 50.98"
41	(United Kingdom) Grace Garner (GBR)	+ 1' 57.75"
42	(Latvia) Endija Rutule (LAT)	+ 1' 59.33"
43	(Slovenia) Katja Jeretina (SLO)	+ 2' 04.74"
44	(South Africa) Monique Gerber (RSA)	+ 2' 24.80"
45	(Uzbekistan) Ekaterina Knebeleva (UZB)	+ 2' 31.03"
46	(Mauritius) Kimberley Le Court (MRI)	+ 2' 36.03"
47	(Egypt) Ebtissam Zayed Ahmed (EGY)	+ 3' 08.21"
48	(South Africa) Michelle Benson (RSA)	+ 3' 25.69"
49	(Egypt) Menatalla Essam Ragab (EGY)	+ 5' 07.77"
