= 2016 Women's Tour de Yorkshire =

2nd women's Tour de Yorkshire

Race details
- Dates: 30 April
- Stages: 1
- Distance: 135 km (83.89 mi)
- Winning time: 3h 22' 26"

Results
| | Winner | Kirsten Wild (NED) | (Hitec Products–Fluid Control) |
| | Second | Lucy Garner (GBR) | (Wiggle High5) |
| | Third | Floortje Mackaij (NED) | (Team Liv-Plantur) |
| Jersey awarded to the youth classification winner | Youth | Lucy Garner (GBR) | (Wiggle High5) |
| Jersey awarded to the team classification winner | Team | Great Britain (National Team) | |

The 2016 Women's Tour de Yorkshire was a cycling one-day race that took place in Yorkshire in April 2016. It was the first edition of the Women's Tour de Yorkshire and was organised by Welcome to Yorkshire and the Amaury Sport Organisation. The race started in Otley, ended in Doncaster and was rated as a 1.2 event.

The race was won by Kirsten Wild (Team Hitec Products) in a bunch sprint. Notable race entrants also included reigning world champion, Lizzie Armitstead who raced for the Great Britain national team, as well as the return of former world time trial champion, Emma Pooley. Pooley stated she would make her return to cycling as part of her build up and bid for Olympic selection.

== Teams ==
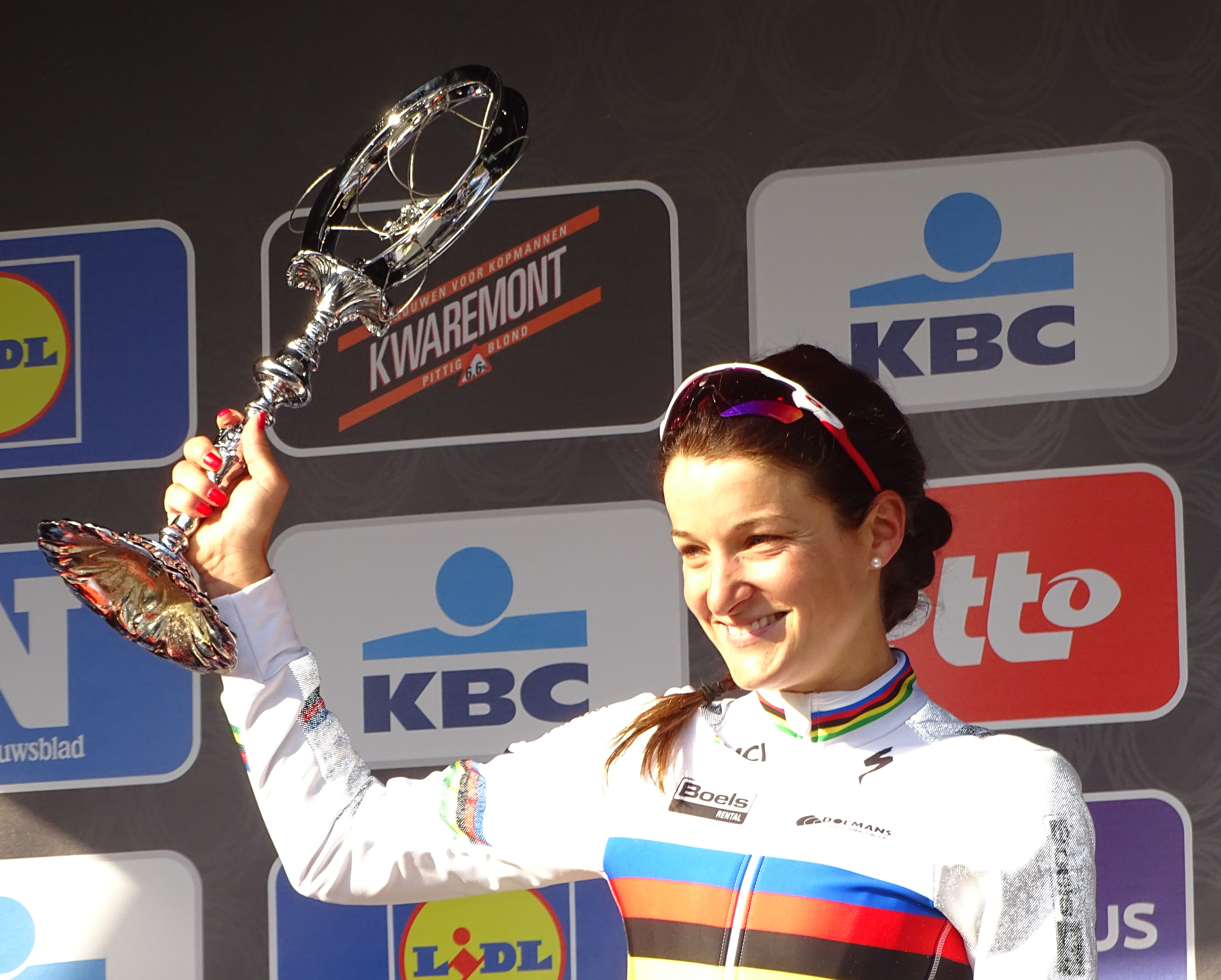
Lizzie Armitstead, pictured here at the 2016 Omloop Het Nieuwsblad, competed on behalf of the Great Britain national team.

| UCI Women's teams | Domestic Elite teams | National teams |
|---|---|---|
| Wiggle High5; Lares–Waowdeals; Cylance Pro Cycling; Hitec Products; Team Liv-Plantur; Podium Ambition Pro Cycling; Drops Cycling Team; Ale Cipollini | Boot Out Breast Cancer Cycling Team; Team Breeze, Team WNT; Team Footon Velosport; Fusion RT Fierlan; Team Ford EcoBoost; Les Filles Racing Team; Team Jadan Weldtite | Great Britain |

== Route ==
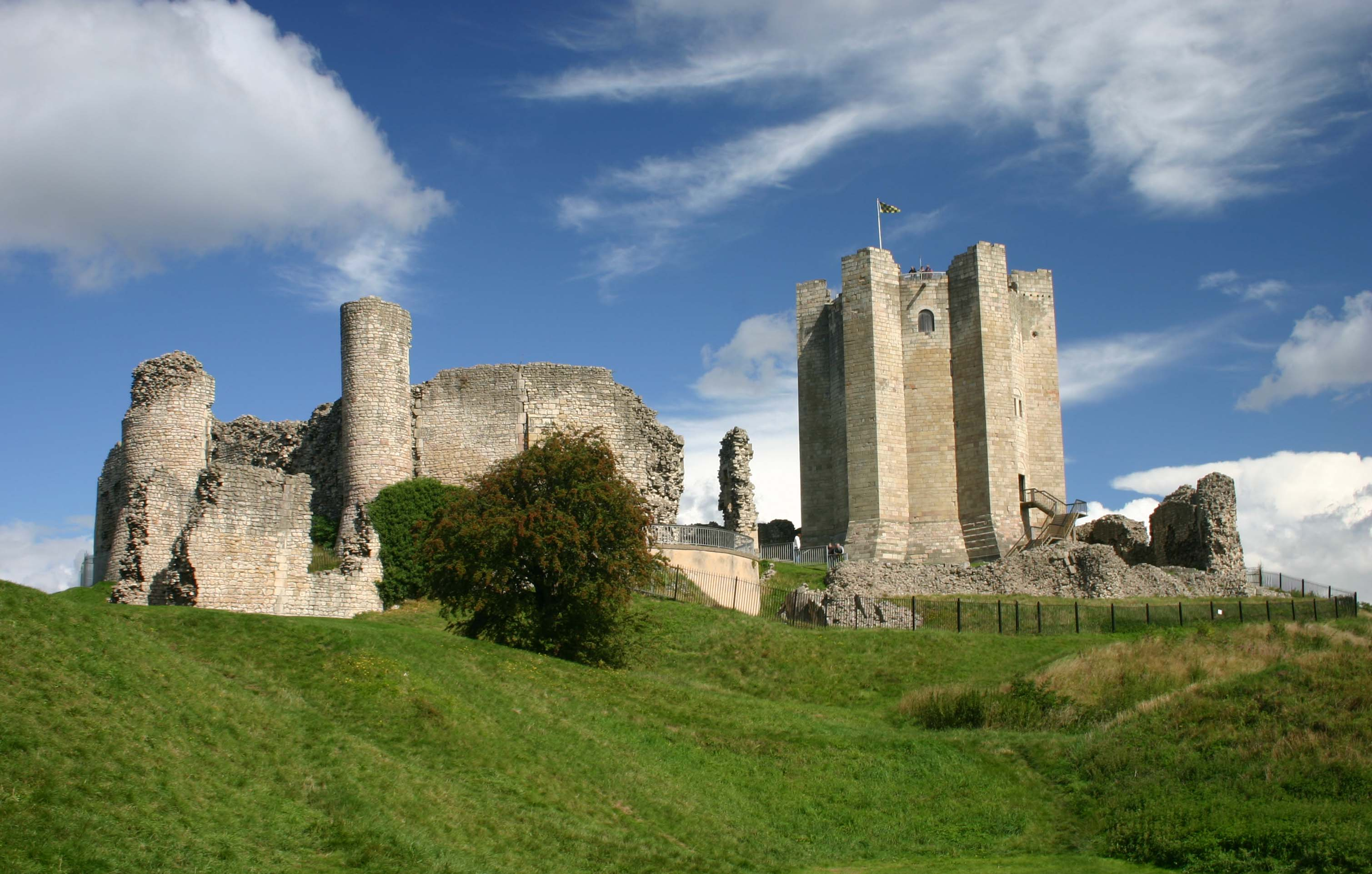
Conisbrough Castle, was one of the three categorised climbs the riders would face.

Starting in Otley, the race headed east towards Harewood, where the women would tackle the first categorised climb of the day – the 1.2 km Côte de Harwood averaging 5% in gradient. The race would continue east, heading through East Keswick taking on the second classified climb of the day – the Côte de East Rigton. The second climb was slightly shorter, at 0.8 km, but boasted a steeper average gradient of 8.2%. The race now headed south, to the intermediate sprint point in Scholes. After the sprint point, the route would take the riders south east, to Sherburn-in-Elmet, then south to Knottingley. After passing through Pontefract the route headed south through Wentbridge, South Elmsall and Hooton Pagnell. After skirting round the westerly side of Doncaster the riders would go through the second intermediate sprint point at Warmsworth and would almost immediately tackle the final and shortest classified climb of the day, the 0.5 km 6.5% Côte de Conisbrough Castle. The final stages of the race saw the route pass through Tickhill and Bawtry before heading north to finish line in Doncaster.

== Race overview ==
The race was won by the Dutch rider Kirsten Wild (Team Hitec Products) in a bunch sprint taking victory ahead of Lucy Garner (Wiggle High5) and Floortje Mackaij (Liv-Plantur).

The race started in Otley with Swiss national time trial champion, Doris Schweizer Cylance Pro Cycling building an early lead of over three minutes within the first 75 km. Towards the second half of the race the sprinters teams came to the fore and began to eat into the lead carved out by Schweizer. With a trimmed lead of only 25 seconds at the summit of Conisbrough Castle, Schweizer was caught by world road race champion Lizzie Armitstead and Canadian rider Leah Kirchmann with around 36 km to go. The trio now joined forced and forged their lead out to over a one minute with 15 km remaining in the race. As the route headed north, back towards Doncaster, the trio encountered a strong headwind – handing the initiative back to the chasing peloton – led by Team Hitec Products and Alé Cipollini. With 10 km to go the lead stood at 45 seconds, but the trio were caught with less than 5 km to go, resulting in Wild opening the bunch sprint with 150 m to go, taking the win by a bike length from Garner.

== Aftermath ==
The race was notable for a number of reasons other than it being a new Women's race in Great Britain. The race boasted a significant prize fund of £50,000, with the victor taking home £15,000. At 136.5 kilometres (84.8 mi) the race is longer than six one day races which comprise the UCI Women's WorldTour, as well as being close to the maximum limit of 140 kilometres (87 mi) for Women's races.

The race should have been broadcast live on both Eurosport and ITV4, however technical issues with the relay aeroplane meant there were little, to no, live pictures.

== Final classification ==
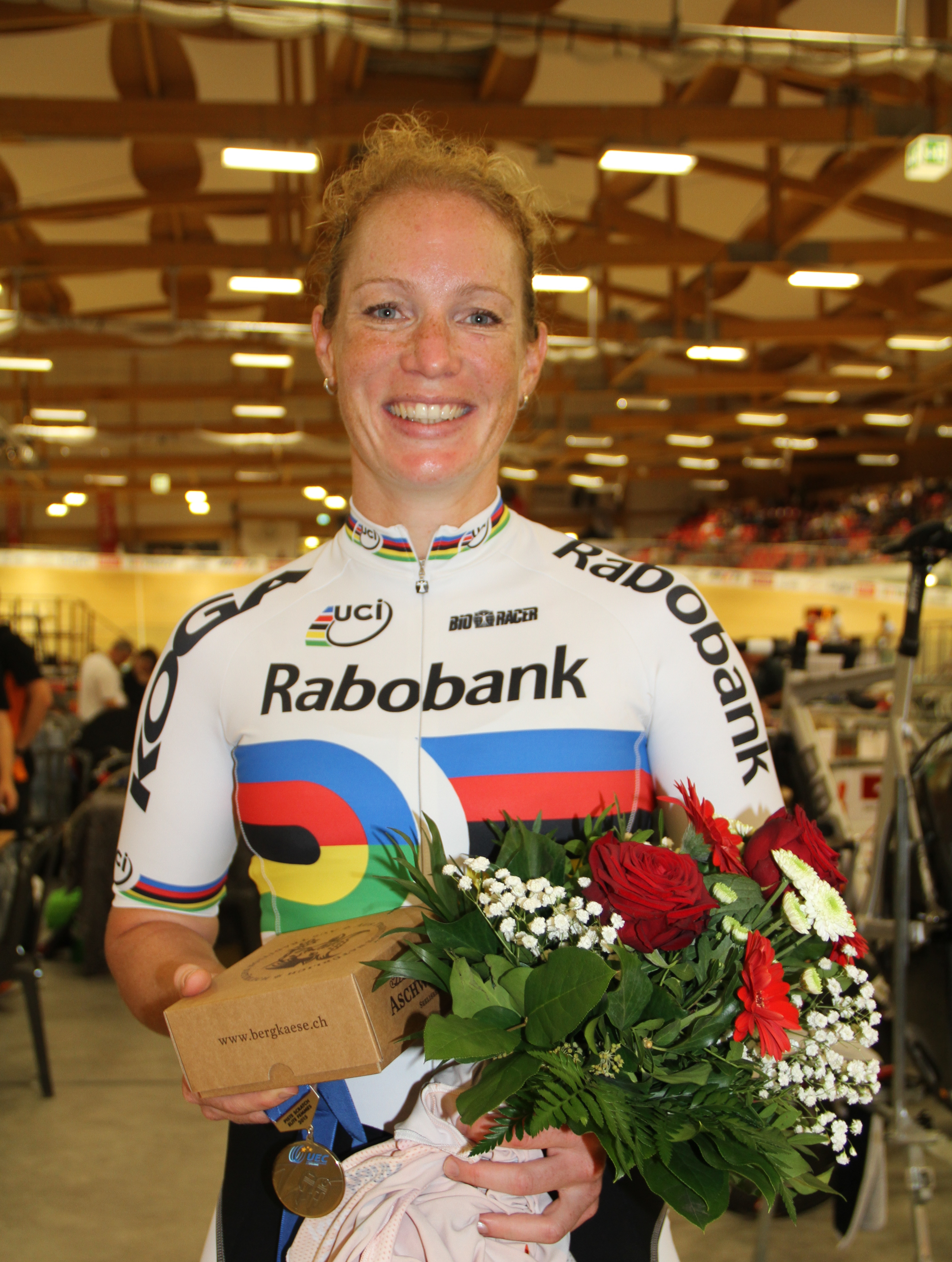
Race winner, Kirsten Wild, pictured here at the 2015 UEC Track Elite European Championships.

Final classification
| Rank | Rider | Team | Time |
|---|---|---|---|
| 1 | Kirsten Wild (NED) | Team Hitec Products | 3h 22' 26" |
| 2 | Lucy Garner (GBR) | Wiggle High5 | s.t. |
| 3 | Floortje Mackaij (NED) | Team Liv-Plantur | s.t. |
| 4 | Alice Barnes (GBR) | Great Britain (National Team) | s.t. |
| 5 | Marta Bastianelli (ITA) | Alé Cipollini | s.t. |
| 6 | Anna Trevisi (ITA) | Alé Cipollini | s.t. |
| 7 | Jennifer George (GBR) | Drops Cycling Team | s.t. |
| 8 | Nicola Juniper (GBR) | Team Ford Ecoboost | s.t. |
| 9 | Nicole Moerig (AUS) | Podium Ambition Pro Cycling | s.t. |
| 10 | Evie Richards (GBR) | Great Britain (National Team) | s.t. |
Source: Tour de Yorkshire website
