= Gornall =

Gornall is a surname. Notable people with the surname include:

- Alan Gornall (born 1960), British cyclist
- Amy Gornall (born 1996), British cyclist
- James Gornall (Royal Navy officer) (1899–1983), British cricketer
- Linda Gornall (born 1964), British cyclist
- Mark Gornall (born 1961), British cyclist
