= 2015 UCI Road World Championships – Women's road race =

Women's road race
2015 UCI Road World Championships
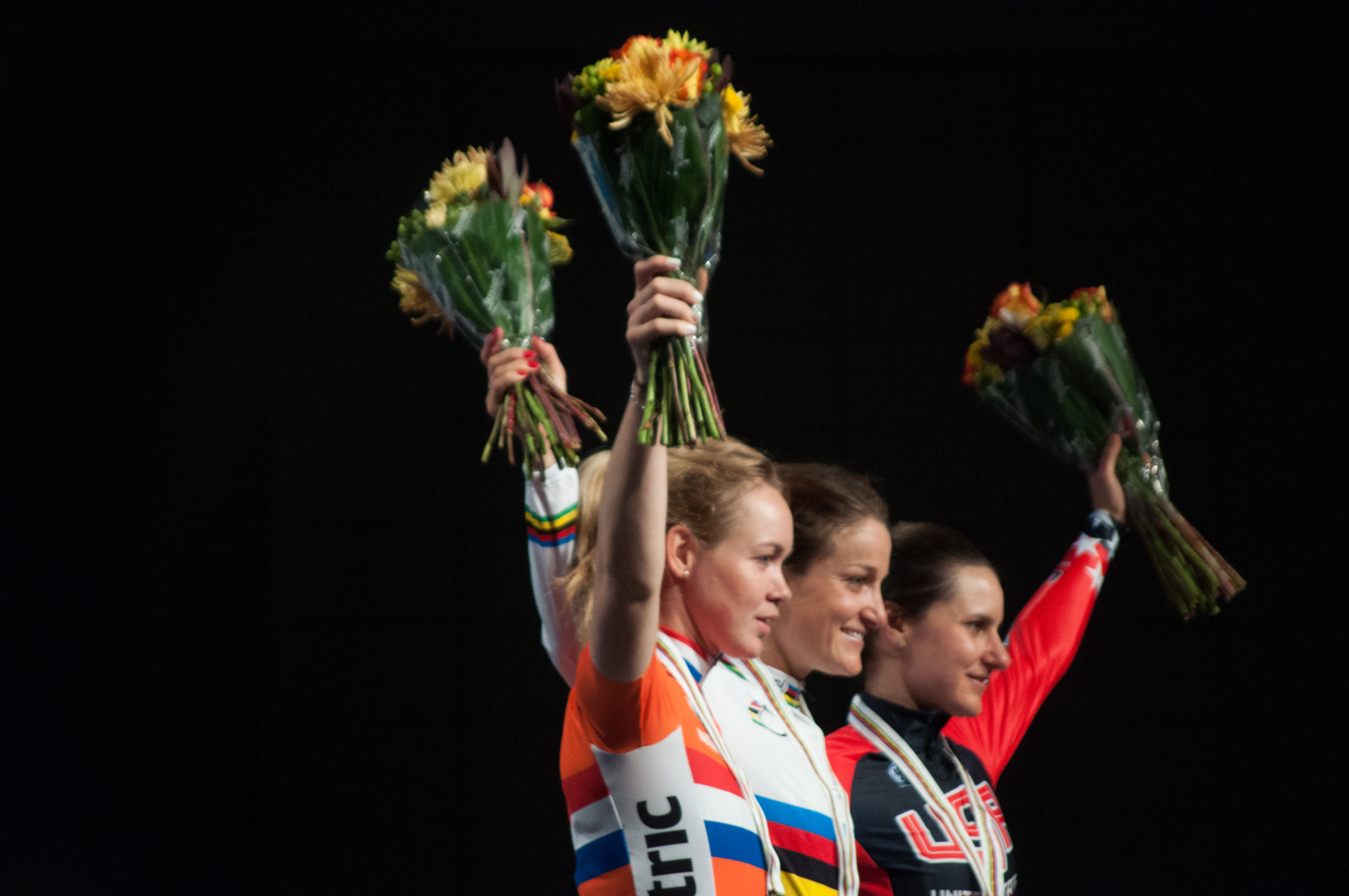
- The winners of the race on the Podium.

Race details
- Dates: September 26, 2015
- Stages: 1 in (United States) Richmond (USA)
- Distance: 129.6 km (80.5 mi)
- Winning time: 3h 23' 56"

Medalists
	Gold	(United Kingdom) Lizzie Armitstead (GBR)
	Silver	(Netherlands) Anna van der Breggen (NED)
	Bronze	(United States) Megan Guarnier (USA)

The Women's road race of the 2015 UCI Road World Championships took place in and around Richmond, Virginia, United States on September 26, 2015. The course of the race was 129.6 km (80.5 mi) with the start and finish in Richmond. Pauline Ferrand-Prévot was the defending champion, having won the world title in 2014.

In a sprint finish of a select group of nine riders, Great Britain's Lizzie Armitstead added the rainbow jersey to her UCI Women's Road World Cup overall victory, out-sprinting Dutch rider Anna van der Breggen by just over a wheel's length. The podium was completed by home rider Megan Guarnier, the first American to podium in the event since 1994.

== Qualification ==
Qualification was based mainly on the 2015 UCI Nation Ranking as of August 15, 2015. The first five nations in this classification qualified seven riders to start, the next ten nations qualified six riders to start and the next five nations qualified five riders to start. Other nations and non ranked nations had the possibility to send three riders to start.

- Netherlands (7)
- Italy (7)
- United States (7)
- Germany (7)
- Australia (7)
- France (6)
- Belgium (6)
- Great Britain (6)
- Sweden (6)
- Poland (6)
- Canada (6)
- South Africa (6)
- Belarus (6)
- Ukraine (6)
- Russia (6)
- Luxembourg (5)
- New Zealand (5)
- Finland (5)
- Brazil (5)
- Norway (5)
- Other nations (3)

Moreover, the outgoing World Champion and continental champions were also able to take part in the race on top of the nation numbers.

Champion	Name	Note
Outgoing World Champion	Pauline Ferrand-Prévot (FRA)	
African Champion	Ashleigh Moolman (RSA)	
European Champion (under-23)	Katarzyna Niewiadoma (POL)	
Pan American Champion	Marlies Mejías (CUB)	Did not participate
Asian Champion	Ting Ying Huang (TPE)	Did not participate
Oceanian Champion	Lauren Kitchen (AUS)	

== Course ==
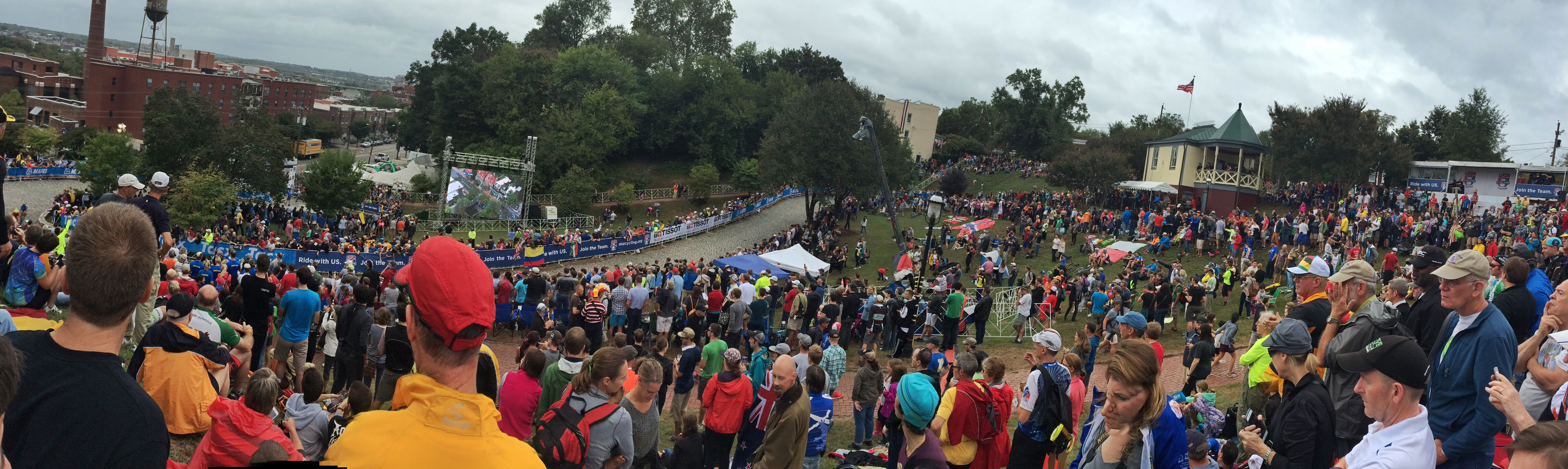
Crowds on Libby Hill

Profile of the road race circuit

The women rode eight laps on the road race circuit. The length of the circuit was 16.2 km (10.1 mi) and had a total elevation of 103 meters (338 feet). All road races took place on a challenging, technical and inner-city road circuit. The circuit headed west from Downtown Richmond, working its way onto Monument Avenue, a paver-lined, historic boulevard that's been named one of the "10 Great Streets in America". Cyclists took a 180-degree turn at the Jefferson Davis monument and then maneuvered through the Uptown district and Virginia Commonwealth University. Halfway through the circuit, the race headed down into Shockoe Bottom before following the canal and passing Great Shiplock Park, the start of the Virginia Capital Trail. A sharp, off-camber turn at Rockets Landing brought the riders to the narrow, twisty, cobbled 200 meters (660 feet) climb up to Libby Hill Park in the historic Church Hill neighborhood. A quick descent, followed by three hard turns led to a 100 meters (330 feet) climb up 23rd Street. Once atop this steep cobbled hill, riders descended into Shockoe Bottom. This led them to the final 300 meters (980 feet) climb on Governor Street. At the top, the riders had to take a sharp left turn onto the false-flat finishing straight, 680 meters (2,230 feet) to the finish.

== Schedule ==
All times are in Eastern Daylight Time (UTC−4).

Date	Time	Event
September 26, 2015	13:00–16:25	Women's road race

== Participating nations ==
135 cyclists from 46 nations took part in the women's road race. The numbers of cyclists per nation are shown in parentheses.

- Australia (8)
- Austria (2)
- Belgium (6)
- Belarus (1)
- Canada (5)
- Chile (1)
- Colombia (3)
- Costa Rica (1)
- Czech Republic (1)
- Denmark (2)
- Ecuador (1)
- Spain (3)
- Finland (2)
- France (7)
- Great Britain (6)
- Germany (7)
- Guam (1)
- Ireland (2)
- Israel (1)
- Italy (7)
- Japan (1)
- Kazakhstan (1)
- Latvia (1)
- Lithuania (2)
- Luxembourg (1)
- Mexico (2)
- Mongolia (1)
- Netherlands (7)
- Norway (4)
- New Zealand (3)
- Poland (7)
- Portugal (1)
- Puerto Rico (1)
- South Africa (3)
- Russia (6)
- Rwanda (1)
- Saint Kitts and Nevis (1)
- Slovenia (2)
- Serbia (1)
- Switzerland (3)
- Slovakia (1)
- Sweden (4)
- Thailand (2)
- Ukraine (4)
- United States (7)
- Venezuela (1)

== Final classification ==
Of the race's 135 entrants, 88 riders completed the full distance of 129.6 kilometres (80.5 mi).

Rank	Rider	Country	Time
1	Lizzie Armitstead	United Kingdom	3h 23' 56"
2	Anna van der Breggen	Netherlands	+ 0"
3	Megan Guarnier	United States	+ 0"
4	Elisa Longo Borghini	Italy	+ 0"
5	Emma Johansson	Sweden	+ 0"
6	Pauline Ferrand-Prévot	France	+ 0"
7	Katarzyna Niewiadoma	Poland	+ 0"
8	Alena Amialiusik	Belarus	+ 0"
9	Jolanda Neff	Switzerland	+ 0"
10	Ellen van Dijk	Netherlands	+ 9"
11	Joëlle Numainville	Canada	+ 9"
12	Trixi Worrack	Germany	+ 9"
13	Karol-Ann Canuel	Canada	+ 9"
14	Ashleigh Moolman	South Africa	+ 9"
15	Christine Majerus	Luxembourg	+ 9"
16	Lucinda Brand	Netherlands	+ 9"
17	Tiffany Cromwell	Australia	+ 9"
18	Elena Cecchini	Italy	+ 17"
19	Rachel Neylan	Australia	+ 17"
20	Lizzie Williams	Australia	+ 17"
21	Małgorzata Jasińska	Poland	+ 17"
22	Linda Villumsen	New Zealand	+ 17"
23	Valentina Scandolara	Italy	+ 19"
24	Evelyn Stevens	United States	+ 19"
25	Amalie Dideriksen	Denmark	+ 31"
26	Emilia Fahlin	Sweden	+ 31"
27	Giorgia Bronzini	Italy	+ 36"
28	Lauren Kitchen	Australia	+ 46"
29	Katrin Garfoot	Australia	+ 46"
30	Lisa Brennauer	Germany	+ 49"
31	Romy Kasper	Germany	+ 51"
32	Leah Kirchmann	Canada	+ 52"
33	Hanna Solovey	Ukraine	+ 52"
34	Daiva Tušlaitė	Lithuania	+ 52"
35	Rasa Leleivytė	Lithuania	+ 52"
36	Alison Jackson	Canada	+ 52"
37	Emilie Moberg	Norway	+ 52"
38	Diana Peñuela	Colombia	+ 52"
39	Coryn Rivera	United States	+ 52"
40	Lotta Lepistö	Finland	+ 52"
41	Elena Kuchinskaya	Russia	+ 52"
42	Eugenia Bujak	Poland	+ 52"
43	Íngrid Drexel	Mexico	+ 52"
44	Tatiana Antoshina	Russia	+ 52"
45	Aude Biannic	France	+ 52"
46	Amy Pieters	Netherlands	+ 52"
47	An-Li Pretorius	South Africa	+ 52"
48	Amanda Spratt	Australia	+ 52"
49	Jolien D'Hoore	Belgium	+ 52"
50	Loren Rowney	Australia	+ 52"
51	Ane Santesteban	Spain	+ 52"
52	Anna Plichta	Poland	+ 52"
53	Audrey Cordon	France	+ 52"
54	Rossella Ratto	Italy	+ 52"
55	Lenore Pipes	Guam	+ 52"
56	Olga Shekel	Ukraine	+ 1' 11"
57	Polona Batagelj	Slovenia	+ 1' 16"
58	Anna Potokina	Russia	+ 1' 25"
59	Oxana Kozonchuk	Russia	+ 1' 25"
60	Gracie Elvin	Australia	+ 1' 25"
61	Chantal Blaak	Netherlands	+ 1' 37"
62	Tatiana Guderzo	Italy	+ 2' 33"
63	Eri Yonamine	Japan	+ 3' 33"
64	Jelena Erić	Serbia	+ 4' 52"
65	Monika Żur	Poland	+ 5' 41"
66	Urša Pintar	Slovenia	+ 5' 41"
67	Iris Slappendel	Netherlands	+ 5' 41"
68	Laura Camila Lozano Ramirez	Colombia	+ 5' 41"
69	Anisha Vekemans	Belgium	+ 5' 41"
70	Monika Brzeźna	Poland	+ 5' 41"
71	Olivia Dillon	Ireland	+ 5' 41"
72	Joanne Kiesanowski	New Zealand	+ 5' 41"
73	Sérika Gulumá	Colombia	+ 5' 41"
74	Hanna Nilsson	Sweden	+ 5' 41"
75	Camilla Møllebro	Denmark	+ 5' 41"
76	Marta Bastianelli	Italy	+ 5' 41"
77	Tayler Wiles	United States	+ 5' 41"
78	Rushlee Buchanan	New Zealand	+ 5' 41"
79	Hayley Simmonds	United Kingdom	+ 5' 41"
80	Doris Schweizer	Switzerland	+ 5' 41"
81	Roxane Knetemann	Netherlands	+ 7' 34"
82	Svetlana Vasilieva	Russia	+ 10' 11"
83	Daniela Reis	Portugal	+ 10' 11"
84	Erika Varela	Mexico	+ 10' 11"
85	Paola Muñoz	Chile	+ 10' 11"
86	Lauren Komanski	United States	+ 10' 11"
87	Jeanne D'arc Girubuntu	Rwanda	+ 11' 37"
88	Sheyla Gutiérrez	Spain	+ 14' 00"

Rank	Rider	Country	Time
	Claudia Lichtenberg	Germany	DNF
	Sara Mustonen	Sweden	DNF
	Alice Barnes	United Kingdom	DNF
	Ingrid Lorvik	Norway	DNF
	Martina Ritter	Austria	DNF
	Anna Sanchis	Spain	DNF
	Amélie Rivat	France	DNF
	Stephanie Pohl	Germany	DNF
	Lucy Garner	United Kingdom	DNF
	Tüvshinjargalyn Enkhjargal	Mongolia	DNF
	Lija Laizāne	Latvia	DNF
	Paz Bash	Israel	DNF
	Miryan Nuñez	Ecuador	DNF
	Cecilie Gotaas Johnsen	Norway	DNF
	Charlotte Becker	Germany	DNF
	Tetyana Ryabchenko	Ukraine	DNF
	Kathrin Hammes	Germany	DNF
	Shelley Olds	United States	DNF
	Annelies Dom	Belgium	DNF
	Pascale Jeuland	France	DNF
	Roxane Fournier	France	DNF
	Natalya Saifutdinova	Kazakhstan	DNF
	Zuzana Neckářová	Czech Republic	DNF
	Cherise Taylor	South Africa	DNF
	Élise Delzenne	France	DNF
	Jessie Daams	Belgium	DNF
	Kaat Hannes	Belgium	DNF
	Jessie Walker	United Kingdom	DNF
	Lauren Stephens	United States	DNF
	Nicole Hanselmann	Switzerland	DNF
	Kathryn Bertine	Saint Kitts and Nevis	DNF
	Chanpeng Nontasin	Thailand	DNF
	Sofie De Vuyst	Belgium	DNF
	Denise Ramsden	Canada	DNF
	Molly Weaver	United Kingdom	DNF
	Tereza Medveďová	Slovakia	DNF
	Daria Egorova	Russia	DNF
	Jennifer Cesar	Venezuela	DNF
	Milagro Mena	Costa Rica	DNF
	Katarzyna Wilkos	Poland	DNF
	Fiona Meade	Ireland	DNF
	Olena Demydova	Ukraine	DNF
	Miriam Bjørnsrud	Norway	DNF
	Sarah Rijkes	Austria	DNF
	Jutatip Maneephan	Thailand	DNF
	Solymar Rivera	Puerto Rico	DNF
	Laura Vainionpää	Finland	DNS
