= Molly Weaver =

British cyclist

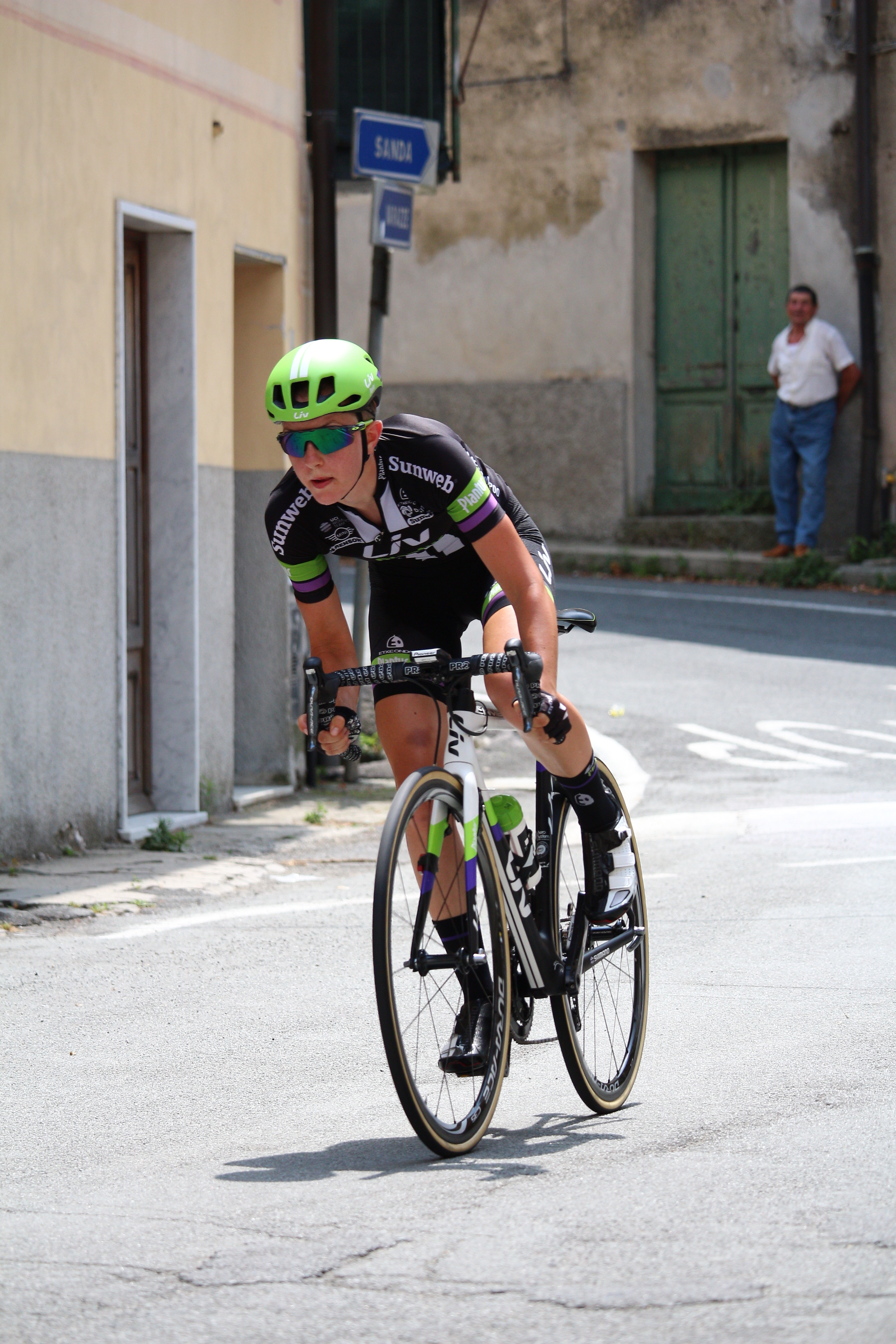
- Weaver during the 2016 Giro d'Italia Femminile

Personal information
- Born: 15 March 1994 (age 32)

Cycling career
- Sport: Cycling
- Current team: Epic Cycles
- Disciplines: Road; Mountain biking; Endurance; Ultra
- Role: Rider
- Rider type: Domestique

Amateur teams
- 2011: Halesowen Athletics & Cycling Club
- 2012: Scott Contessa Epic Race Team
- 2013: Breast Cancer Care Cycling Team
- 2014: Epic Cycles-Scott Contessa (Q38100047)
- 2019: Orbea Racing Team
- 2020–: Epic Cycles

Professional teams
- 2015: Matrix Fitness Pro Cycling
- 2015–2017: Team Liv–Plantur
- 2017: Team Sunweb
- 2018: Trek–Drops

Molly Weaver (born 15 March 1994) is a British cyclist, who rode for a number of amateur and professional road racing teams, before retiring and pursuing other aspects of the sport, including endurance and ultracycling.

== Road racing career ==
=== Amateur ===
Weaver started her sporting career as a hockey player, competing at a local level. She took up cycling after sustaining a knee injury. She initially competed on the track at Halesowen Cycling Club, and then moved into road racing in 2011.

In 2012, Weaver joined the Scott Contessa Epic Race Team. During the season, she competed in a number of UK road races, as well as the Tour de Feminin – O cenu Českého Švýcarska. She was also selected by British Cycling to join the Junior Women's team for the 2012 UCI Road World Championships. The team's support for Lucy Garner in her successful defence of her world title was nominated as one of British Cycling's 'Rides of the Year':

For five junior athletes to replicate a tactic demonstrated by Team Sky at the Tour de France and Team GB during the London 2012 Olympic Games road races would have been fantastic. To then deliver the result two years in a row – on both occasions against adversity – was one of the greatest moments of 2012.

Weaver moved to the Breast Cancer Care Cycling Team for the 2013 season. Notable races that year included Belgian and Dutch races (the Omloop van het Hageland, Omloop van Borsele and Dwars door de Westhoek) and the 3 Days of Bedford Women's Stage Race (in which her team won the team time trial and she finished fourth overall). She also competed in the British National Road Race and Time Trial Championships, finishing 18th in both events. She finished the season ranked 10th in her category.

For the 2014 season, Weaver rejoined her previous team, now renamed Epic Cycles - Scott Contessa Women's Racing Team. Riding with her new team in the 3 Days of Bedford Women's Stage Race, she won the individual time trial and the team won the team time trial. Other notable races included the 2014 Tour de Bretagne Féminin, in which she finished 31st in the general classification, and the Rás na mBan, where she was placed third overall. She also took the best young rider award and was the best-placed British rider in the race. In June 2014, Weaver acquired her Elite category licence from British Cycling. She finished the year ranked 22nd in that category.

=== Professional ===
Weaver's first professional season began with the Matrix Fitness Pro Cycling team in 2015, with whom she finished eighth in the Cholet Pays de Loire Dames and seventh in the Women's Dwars door Vlaanderen before making a mid-season transfer to Team Liv–Plantur. In her first race with that team, the Aviva Women's Tour, she finished eighth in the youth classfication and 30th in the general classification. In August 2015, she finished fourth in the youth classification of La Route de France (27th overall).

At the 2015 British National Road Championships in June, Weaver finished second in the time trial, and fourth in the road race. She was also selected by British Cycling for the 2015 UCI Road World Championships. Although she did not finish the race, she and the rest of the team were able to support Lizzie Armitstead in winning a second world title.

Staying with Liv-Plantur in 2016, Weaver improved on her performance at the 2016 Aviva Women's Tour, finishing second to her teammate Floortje Mackaij in the youth classification, as well as 17th overall, 16th in the points classification, and 23rd in the climbing classification.

While racing for Team Sunweb (as Liv-Plantur was renamed in 2017), Weaver moved her training base to Girona. On 9 February 2017, while on a training ride in the area, she was hit by a car driver and very severely injured. Despite the severity of her injuries, she was able to start the Giro Rosa in June of the same year. However, she was one of two riders who did not finish the final stage. Her final race for Team Sunweb was the 2017 Prudential RideLondon Classique, which was won by her teammate Coryn Rivera.

In 2018 she joined the British Trek–Drops team as their road captain. Weaver and the team rode in three races in Australia in January 2018, but those were her last professional races. In May 2018, she wrote on her personal blog that she was taking a break from professional cycling to concentrate on her mental health. In an interview with BBC Sport, she was quoted as having concerns about the lack of psychological support in professional cycling as a whole, but reiterated her love for cycling generally.

== Later cycling activities ==
In 2019, Weaver returned to road cycling as an amateur, finishing 37th in the East Cleveland Klondike GP, representing the Spanish manufacturer Orbea. She entered a number of other UK-based races that season, but without success.

In April 2020, she had signed up to ride a gravel race, the Dirty Reiver, but it was cancelled due to the COVID-19 pandemic. Instead, she decided to replicate the race in her parents' garden, marking out a 100-metre circuit that she would ride over 1300 laps. She aimed to raise £2,500 for the Women's Aid Federation, but actually succeeded in generating over £13,800. British Cycling named this 'epic garden adventure' as one of their five highlights of 2020.

Having taken up endurance riding, Weaver was named as one of Cycling UK's '100 Women in Cycling' in 2022.

== World record ==
In November 2024, Weaver announced via her Instagram account that the following June she would be attempting to set a new world record for the fastest circumnavigation of the British coastline by bicycle. The existing record, set by Nick Sanders in 1984, has been replicated using a set of 118 waypoints and a minimum distance of 7730 km approved by the World Ultra Cycling Association. She started the record attempt by leaving Tower Bridge in London at 4am on 4 June 2025, with the aim of returning within 22 days. In addition to setting a record, she aims to raise at least £7730 for the RNLI.

On 6 July 2025, Weaver completed the circumnavigation in 21 days, 10 hours and 48 minutes, setting a new record (subject to verification by WUCA).

== See also ==
- List of 2015 UCI Women's Teams and riders
