= Matrix Fitness Pro Cycling =

Team information
- UCI code: MAT
- Registered: United Kingdom
- Founded: 2009
- Discipline: Road
- Status: National team (2009–2014); UCI Women's Team (2015– )
- Bicycles: Velocite (2012–2014); Trek (2015– )
- Website: Team home page

Key personnel
- General manager: Jon Johnston
- Team manager: Stefan Wyman

Team name history
- 2012 2013 2014 2015–2016: Matrix Fitness-Prendas; Matrix Fitness Racing Academy; Matrix Fitness-Vulpine; Matrix Fitness Pro Cycling

Matrix Fitness (UCI code MAT) was a British cycling team which competed in road bicycle racing and track cycling events from 2009 to 2016. For the 2015 season the team registered as a UCI Women's Team, the top level of professional women's cycling, so could compete in elite international events including the UCI Women's Road World Cup. The team was sponsored by Matrix Fitness, Milltag, and Vulpine.

== Team history ==
=== 2014 ===
The team announced that in 2015 they would become a UCI Women's team. Trek will sponsor the team for the first season in the top division of Women's cycling, with the team riding the same bikes as the men's Trek Factory Racing team.

==== Riders in ====
For the 2015 season the team signed track World Champions, Elinor Barker and Laura Trott from rival British team Wiggle–Honda. The team also signed Sara Olsson (Team Hitec Products), Lucy Martin (Estado de México–Faren Kuota), Christina Siggaard (Firefighters Upsala CK) and Molly Weaver. The team also negotiated contract extensions with Melissa Lowther, Harriet Owen, Penny Rowson and Jessie Walker.

== Team roster ==
=== 2015 ===
As of 10 March 2015. Ages as of 1 January 2015.

Rider	Date of birth
Christina Siggaard (DEN)	24 March 1994 (aged 20)
Penny Rowson (GBR)	3 May 1992 (aged 22)
Lucy Martin (GBR)	5 May 1990 (aged 24)
Elinor Barker (GBR)	7 September 1994 (aged 20)
Molly Weaver (GBR)	15 March 1994 (aged 20)

Rider	Date of birth
Melissa Lowther (GBR)	15 May 1996 (aged 18)
Harriet Owen (GBR)	16 December 1993 (aged 21)
Jessie Walker (GBR)	20 September 1994 (aged 20)
Laura Trott (GBR)	24 April 1992 (aged 22)
Sara Olsson (SWE)	6 March 1990 (aged 24)

== Major wins ==
2012
UCI Track World Cup London (Team pursuit), Dani King & Joanna Rowsell
UCI Track World Cup London (Individual pursuit), Joanna Rowsell
Johnson Health Grand Prix, Annabel Simpson
Newport Nocturne Criterium, Penny Rowson
Olympic Games, Track (Team Pursuit), Dani King & Joanna Rowsell
Rochster Cyclo-cross I, Helen Wyman
Rochster Cyclo-cross II, Helen Wyman
Breinigsville Cyclo-cross, Helen Wyman
Baltimore Cyclo-cross I, Helen Wyman
Baltimore Cyclo-cross II, Helen Wyman
Gloucester Cyclo-cross, Helen Wyman
Providence Cyclo-cross I, Helen Wyman
Providence Cyclo-cross II, Helen Wyman
Koppenberg Cyclo-cross, Helen Wyman
Iowa City Cyclo-cross I, Helen Wyman
Iowa City Cyclo-cross II, Helen Wyman
Iowa City Cyclo-cross II, Helen Wyman
Gieten Cyclo-cross, Helen Wyman
2014
National Championship, Helen Wyman
Otegem Cyclo-cross, Helen Wyman
Middelkerke Cyclo-cross, Helen Wyman
Heerlen Cyclo-cross, Helen Wyman
Baltimore Cyclo-cross, Helen Wyman
Baltimore Cyclo-cross I, Helen Wyman
Gloucester Cyclo-cross II, Helen Wyman
's-Hertogenbosch Cyclo-cross, Helen Wyman
2015
Revolution Series – Manchester (Scratch), Elinor Barker
Grand Prix of Poland (Omnium), Laura Trott
Grand Prix of Poland (Scratch), Laura Trott
Jeux Africains 2015 de Brazzaville Road Race, Kimberley Le Court

== National, continental and world champions ==
2012
British Cyclocross, Helen Wyman
World Track (Team pursuit), Dani King
World Track (Team pursuit), Joanna Rowsell
British U23 National XC, Annabel Simpson
European Cyclocross, Helen Wyman
2015
British Track (Individual pursuit), Laura Trott
British Track (Points race), Laura Trott
British Track (Scratch race), Laura Trott
European (Team Pursuit), Laura Trott
European (Team Pursuit), Elinor Barker
European (Scratch race), Laura Trott
European (Omnium), Laura Trott
