= Penny Rowson =

British cyclist

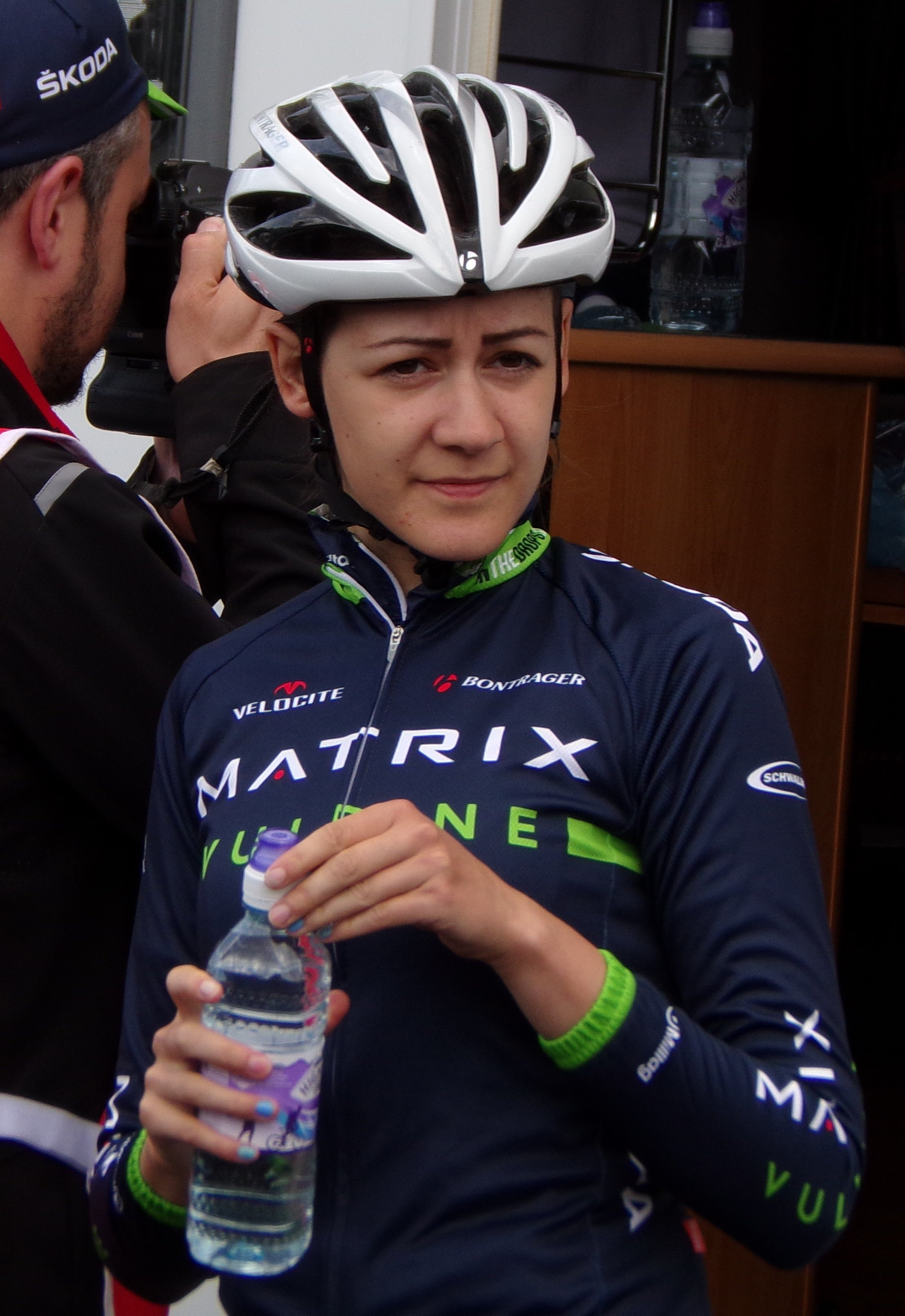
- Rowson during a break in a 2014 race

Personal information
- Born: 3 May 1992 (age 34)

Cycling career
- Sport: Cycling

Amateur teams
- 2010-2012: Matrix Fitness–Prendas
- 2013: Breast Cancer Care

Professional team
- 2015-: Matrix Fitness Pro Cycling

Penelope "Penny" Rowson (born 3 May 1992) is a British former professional racing cyclist.

== Career ==
After finishing 3rd in the 2009 Cheshire Classic Road Race, Rowson joined, in 2010, the Matrix Fitness professional team.

In 2012, she became the first female winner of the Newport Nocturne cycling race. She left Matrix in 2013 and joined the cycling pro team run by the Breast Cancer Care charity.

In 2014, she returned to the Matrix team but in August 2015 she announced her retirement from the sport.

== See also ==
- List of 2015 UCI Women's Teams and riders
- Breast cancer
