= Fenna Vanhoutte =

Belgian cyclist

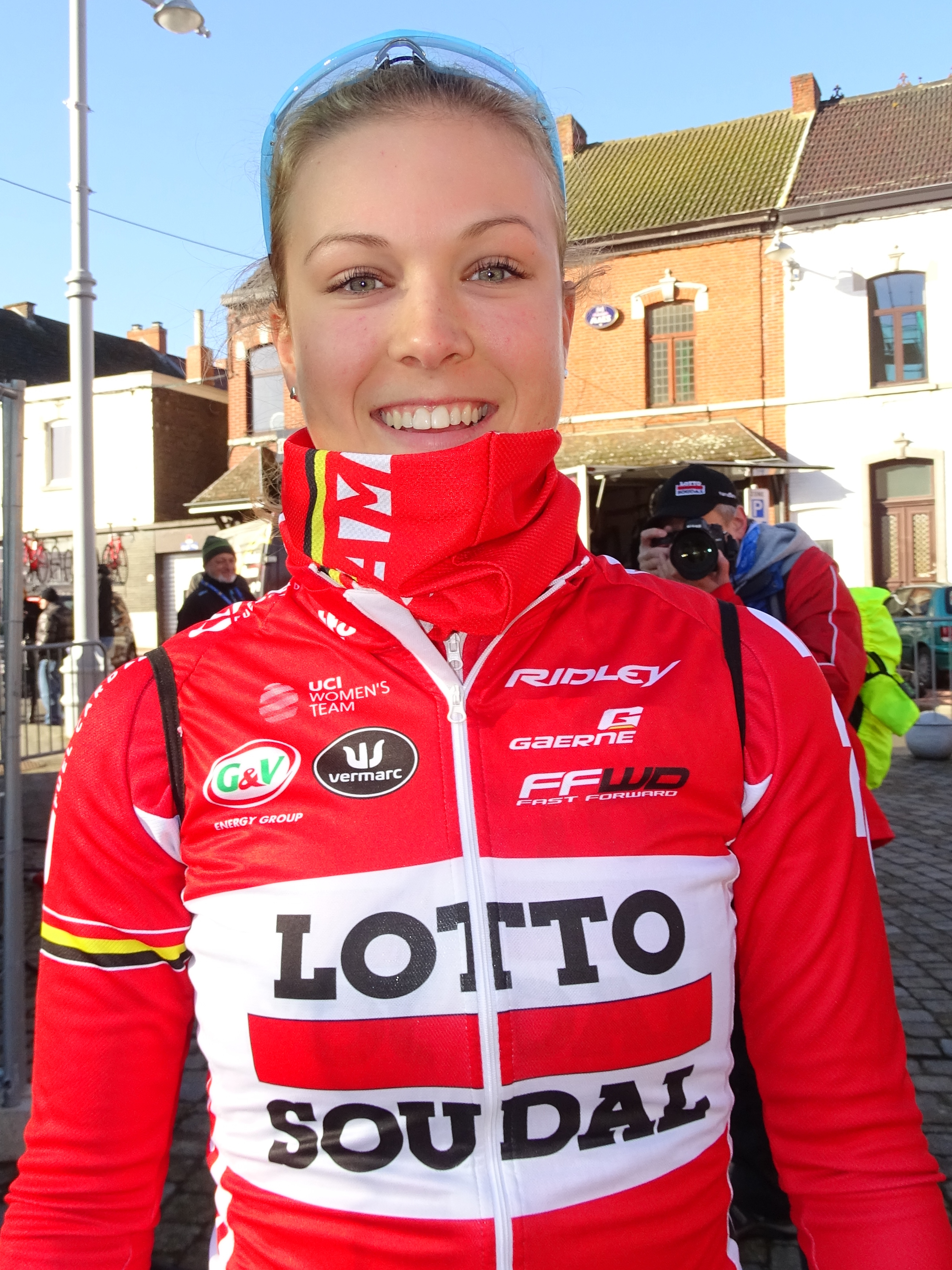
- Vanhoutte in 2016.

Personal information
- Full name: Fenna Vanhoutte
- Born: 6 July 1997 (age 29)

Cycling career
- Sport: Cycling
- Discipline: Road
- Role: Rider

Professional team
- 2016–2019: Lotto–Soudal Ladies

Fenna Vanhoutte (born 6 July 1997) is a Belgian professional racing cyclist, who last rode for UCI Women's Team Lotto–Soudal Ladies.

At the 2015 European Road Championships for juniors in Tartu, she tied for tenth place. She was 32nd at the 2015 UCI Road World Championships in the women's junior road race in Richmond, Virginia.

== See also ==
- List of 2016 UCI Women's Teams and riders
