= Lauren Creamer =

Irish cyclist

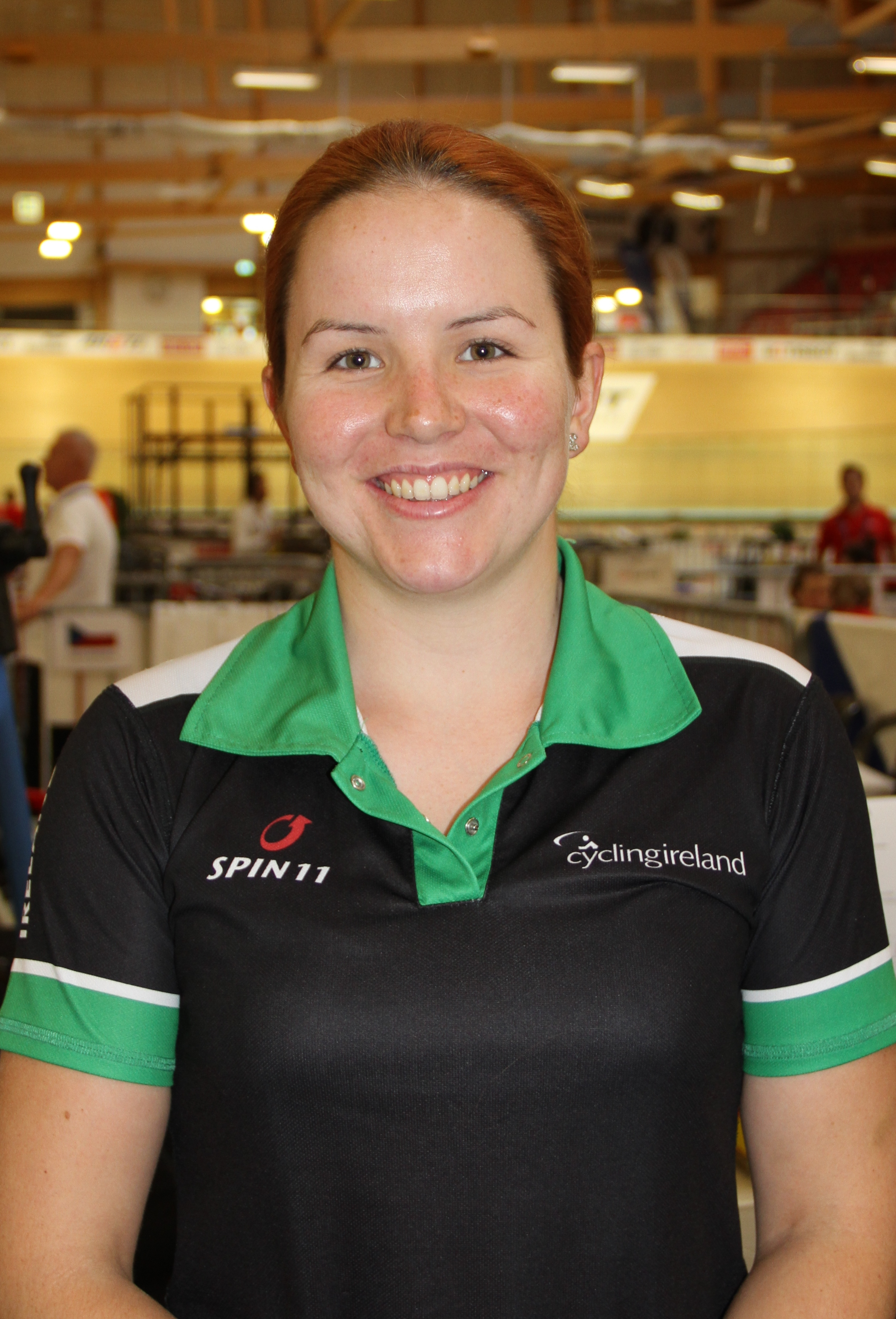
- Creamer at the 2015 UEC European Track Championships

Personal information
- Full name: Lauren Holly Creamer
- Born: 20 January 1992 (age 34) Birmingham, United Kingdom

Cycling career
- Sport: Cycling
- Current team: Velo Fixers
- Discipline: Road
- Role: Rider

Amateur teams
- 2008–2010: Wolverhampton Wheelers
- 2011–2012: Abergavenny Road Club
- 2013: ISCorp Cycling/NCSF
- 2014–2015: Madison–Boot Out Breast Cancer Care
- 2017: Weston Homes–Torelli–Assure
- 2018: Brotherton Cycles
- 2018–2019: Autoglas Wetteren
- 2022-: Velo Fixers

Professional teams
- 2016: Podium Ambition Pro Cycling
- 2020: Massi–Tactic
- 2021: Lviv Cycling Team

Lauren Holly Creamer (born 20 January 1992) is a British-born Irish racing cyclist, who previously rode for three professional teams. She also rode at the 2015 UCI Track Cycling World Championships.
