= Emma White (cyclist) =

American cyclist

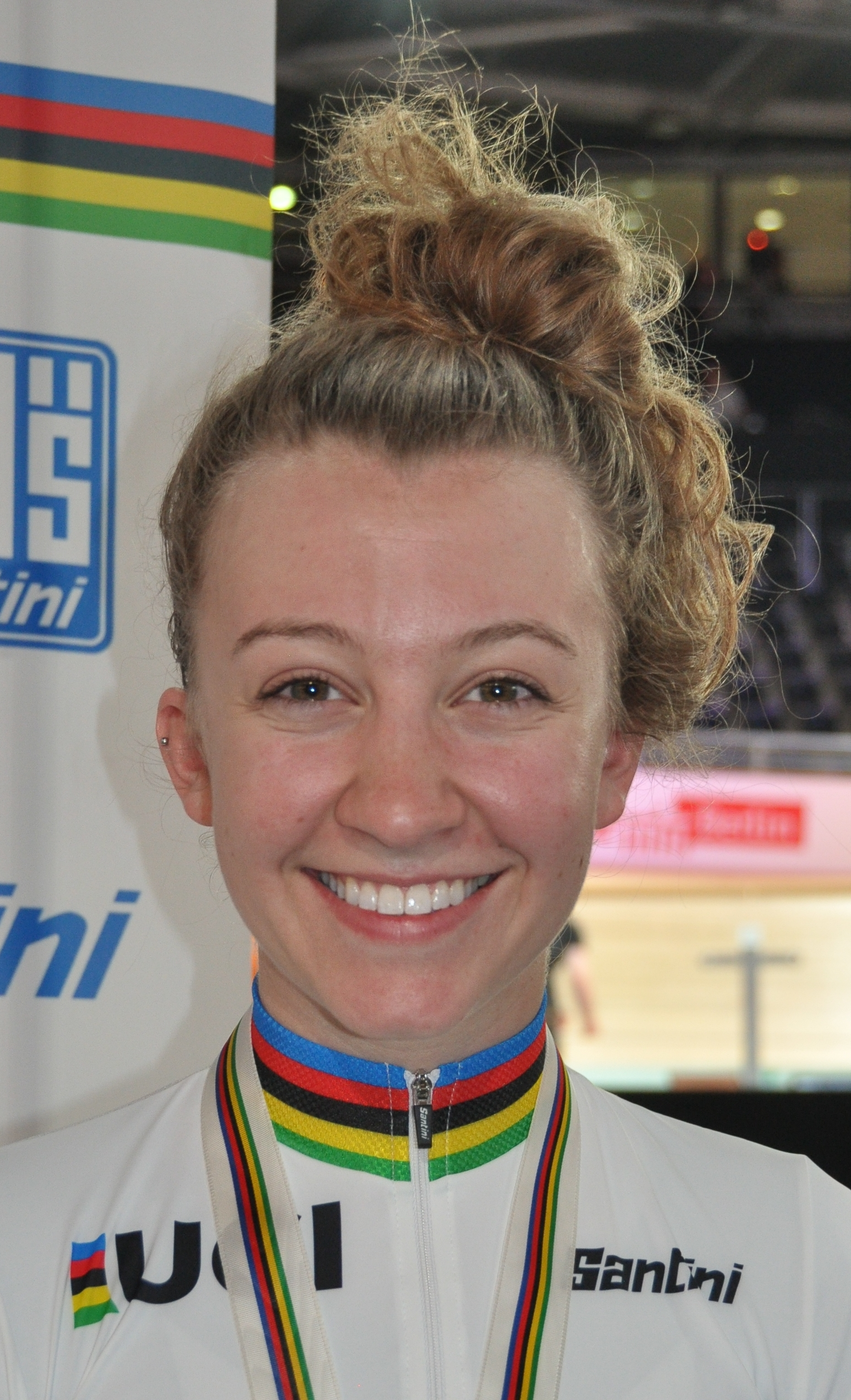
- White in 2020

Personal information
- Full name: Emma White
- Born: August 23, 1997 (age 29) Duanesburg, New York, United States

Cycling career
- Sport: Cycling
- Current team: Retired
- Disciplines: Road; Track; Cyclo-cross
- Role: Rider
- Rider type: All-rounder

Professional team
- 2016–2021: Rally Cycling
Medal record
Representing United States
Women's track cycling
Olympic Games
Bronze medal – third place	2020 Tokyo	Team pursuit
World Championships
Gold medal – first place	2020 Berlin	Team pursuit
Pan American Championships
Silver medal – second place	2019 Cochabamba	Team pursuit
Bronze medal – third place	2019 Cochabamba	Individual pursuit
Women's road bicycle racing
World Championships
Silver medal – second place	2015 Richmond	Junior time trial
Silver medal – second place	2015 Richmond	Junior road race

Emma White (born August 23, 1997) is an American former professional racing cyclist, who rode professionally between 2016 and 2021, entirely for UCI Women's Continental Team Rally Cycling.

Competing in both track cycling and road bicycle racing, White was a member of the American squad that won the team pursuit at the 2020 UCI Track Cycling World Championships, and also won medals in the same event at the Tokyo Olympics in 2021 and the 2019 Pan American Track Cycling Championships. She also won two silver medals at the 2015 UCI Road World Championships, finishing behind teammate Chloé Dygert in both the time trial and road race.

== Biography ==
The sister of fellow racing cyclist Curtis White, Emma White started cycle racing at the age of nine, initially in cyclo-cross. She had already taken up horse riding early in her childhood, and continued to pursue this alongside cycling until the age of 16. She won three consecutive national junior cyclo-cross championships in the 13–14 and 15–16 age groups between 2011 and 2013 before winning the 17–18 junior title in 2015. She also enjoyed a successful junior career on the road, winning consecutive national junior time trial championships in different age groups in 2013 and 2014 and the national junior criterium championship in 2015, as well as taking two silver medals at the 2015 UCI Road World Championships.

White also won a bronze medal in the 2015 U23 national cyclo-cross championships. She was subsequently crowned national U23 cyclo-cross champion in 2018, also placing seventh in the U23 race at the 2018 UCI Cyclo-cross World Championships. Shortly after the cyclo-cross worlds, she attended a track talent ID camp at the behest of her coach, Kristin Armstrong, and was invited by Gary Sutton, the coach of the US team pursuit squad, to join the team, to which she agreed, beginning training with the squad in the summer of 2018.

The following year White became national senior criterium champion in Knoxville: at the age of 21 she became the youngest rider to win that title, additionally securing the U23 championship. She dedicated her victory to her former team-mate Kelly Catlin, who had committed suicide earlier in 2019. A couple of days later, she went on to finish third in the senior United States National Road Race Championships and win the U23 road title. That year she also graduated from Union College, having pursued an interdepartmental major in computer science and science, medicine and technology.

White was selected to compete in the team pursuit at the 2020 Track Cycling World Championships alongside Lily Williams, Chloé Dygert and Jennifer Valente: the quartet set the fastest time in qualifying and beat Great Britain in the final to win the rainbow jersey. She also competed in the same event at the delayed 2020 Olympics in Tokyo the following year: although Team USA were defeated by Team GB in the semi-finals, they took bronze in the third place ride-off against Canada. White announced her retirement from competition in October 2021 at the age of 24, shortly after taking a final win in the criterium at the Sea Otter Classic where she led a clean sweep for Rally Cycling ahead of team-mates Heidi Franz and Kristabel Doebel-Hickok.

== Major results ==
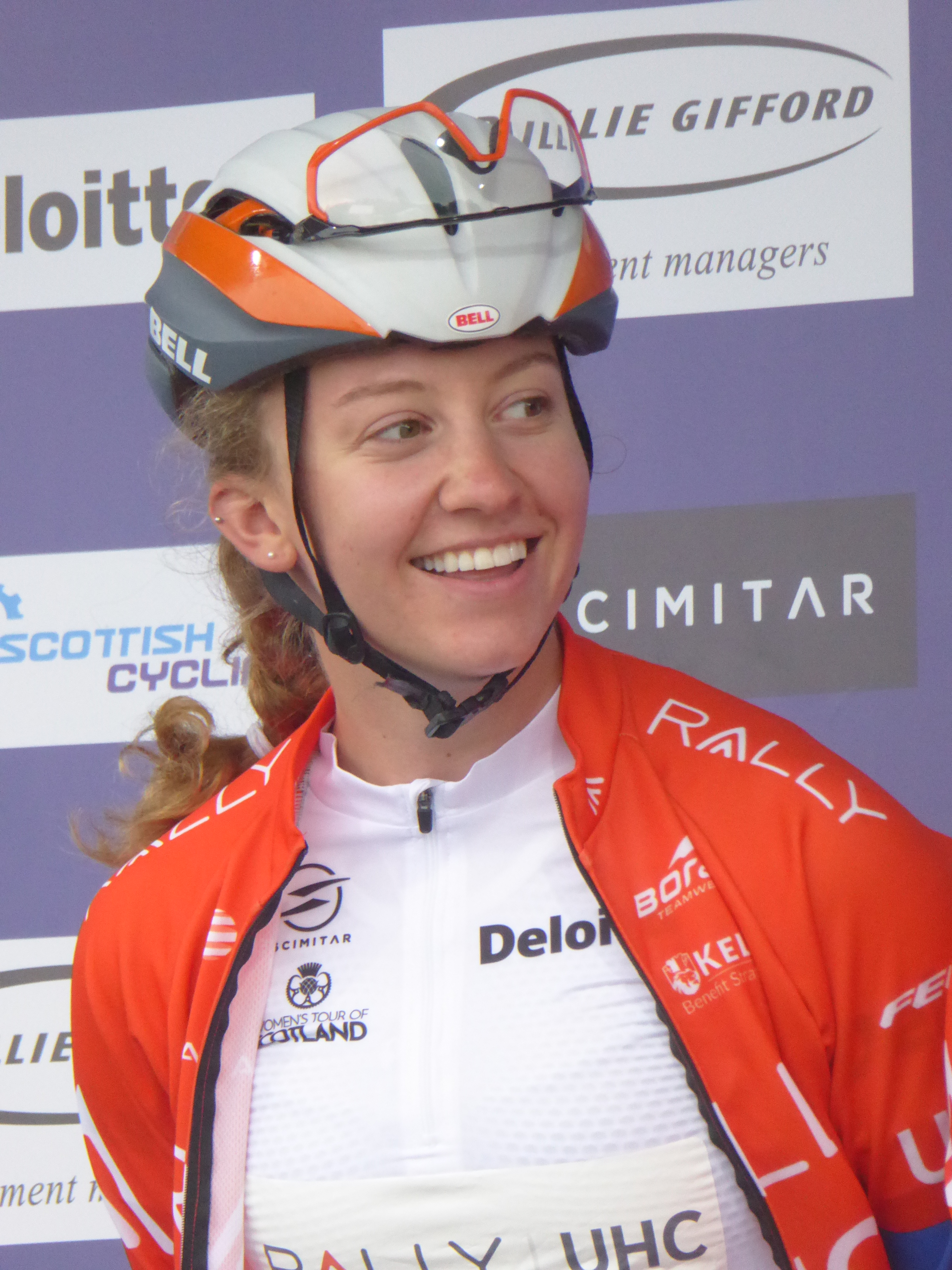
White at the 2019 Women's Tour of Scotland, where she finished tenth overall

2014
National Junior Road Championships

1st Time trial
2nd Road race

5th Time trial, UCI Junior Road World Championships
2015
National Junior Road Championships

1st Criterium
2nd Time trial

UCI Junior Road World Championships

2nd Road race
2nd Time trial

3rd Under-23 race, National Cyclo-cross Championships
2017
1st Stage 4 Tour of the Gila
2018
National Road Championships

1st Under-23 road race
1st Under-23 time trial
1st Under-23 criterium
3rd Road race
3rd Time trial

1st Under-23 race, National Cyclo-cross Championships
1st Sprints classification, Tour of California
7th Under-23 race, UCI Cyclo-cross World Championships
8th Overall Tour of the Gila

1st Points classification
1st Stage 4

2019
National Road Championships

1st Criterium
1st Under-23 criterium
3rd Road race

10th Overall Women's Tour of Scotland
2020
1st Team pursuit, UCI Track World Championships
2021
1st Criterium, Sea Otter Classic
3rd Team pursuit, Olympic Games

== See also ==
- List of 2016 UCI Women's Teams and riders
