= Daria Egorova =

Russian cyclist

Personal information
- Born: 23 February 1996 (age 30)

Cycling career
- Sport: Cycling
- Current team: Retired
- Disciplines: Road; Track
- Role: Rider

Daria Egorova (born 23 February 1996) is a Russian former professional racing cyclist. She rode in the women's road race at the 2015 UCI Road World Championships.

== Major results ==
2014
1st Individual pursuit, UEC European Junior Track Championships
National Junior Road Championships

2nd Road race
3rd Time trial

UEC European Junior Road Championships

3rd Road race
4th Time trial

10th Time trial, UCI Junior Road World Championships
2015
3rd Road race, National Road Championships
