= 2015 British National Track Championships =

British track cycling competition

- Venue: Manchester, England
- Date: 26–28 September 2015
- Velodrome: Manchester Velodrome
- Cyclists participating: 100
- Events: 17 and 6 para-cycling

The 2015 British National Track Championships were a series of track cycling competitions held from 25–27 September 2015 at the Manchester Velodrome. They are organised and sanctioned by British Cycling, and were open to British cyclists.

== Competition ==
Separate competitions will be held for both men and women, and 6 events are also included for paracyclists

Open to British cyclists, the winners of each event are entitled to wear the national champion's jersey - a white jersey with a red, white and blue front stripe - for the next year when competing in that discipline. Twenty-two gold medals will be awarded over three days and six sessions; the event had previously taken place over 5 days.

The women's sprint events were dominated by rising star Katy Marchant, as she matched the 4 gold clean sweep of the sprint events achieved by Jessica Varnish in 2014. The women's endurance events were dominated by Laura Trott winning each of the individual endurance races ahead of main rival of the championships Katie Archibald. Archibald's victory in team pursuit being the sole race Trott was unable to win. Such was her dominance that Trott only just missed out on medals in sprint events as well, finishing a very close fourth in the 500 metre time trial.

On the men's side, unpredictable racing was the order of the day. With defending quadruple champion Callum Skinner injured and not competing, the remaining elite sprinters, Jason Kenny, Matt Crampton and Lewis Oliva shared the spoil's between themselves, with Kenny combining with Crampton and Philip Hindes to take team sprint honours.

== Medal summary ==
=== Men's Events ===
Event	Gold		Silver		Bronze	
Men's Events
Kilo.	Jason Kenny	1:02.042	Matthew Crampton	1:02.186	Steven Burke	1:03.710
Sprint	Lewis Oliva		Matt Rotherham		Jonathan Mitchell	
Keirin	Matthew Crampton		Lewis Oliva		Thomas Rotherham	
Team sprint	Jason Kenny; Matthew Crampton; Philip Hindes	44.001	Peter Mitchell; Matt Roper; Tom Scammell	46.763	Jack Payne; Matt Rotherham; Tom Rotherham	46.242
Individual Pursuit	Andy Tennant; WIGGINS	4:23.583	Germain Burton; Team 100%ME	4:27.209	Jon Dibben; WIGGINS	4:24.906
Team pursuit	100%ME; Germain Burton; Jake Kelly; Mark Stewart; Oliver Wood	4:06.417	Scottish Development; Peter Anderson; Tom Arnstein; Philip Trodden; Ruari Yeoman	ct at 3:05.704	Scottish Juniors; Andy Brown; Tom Chandler; Angus Claxton; Lewis Mulholland	4:15.902
Points race	Oliver Wood	66	Mark Stewart	63	Christopher Latham	47
Scratch race	Mark Stewart		Jon Dibben		Christopher Latham	

=== Women's Events ===
Event	Gold		Silver		Bronze	
Women's Events
500m time trial	Katy Marchant	34.496	Victoria Williamson	34.743	Eleanor Richardson	35.960
Sprint	Katy Marchant		Becky James		Victoria Williamson	
Keirin	Katy Marchant		Becky James		Jessica Varnish	
Team sprint	North West Region C Katy Marchant; Jessica Varnish	33.424	North West Region B Shanaze Reade; Victoria Williamson	34.392	North West Region D Eleanor Richardson; Helen Scott	35.257
Individual Pursuit	Laura Trott; Matrix-Fitness	3.32.759	Katie Archibald; Pearl Izumi	3.33.065	Ciara Horne; Pearl Izumi	3.37.262
Team pursuit	Pearl Izumi; Katie Archibald; Ciara Horne; Joanna Rowsell Shand; Sarah Storey	ct. opp.	not awarded 3 entrants only			
Points race	Laura Trott	100	Katie Archibald	88	Emily Kay	82
Scratch race	Laura Trott; Matrix-Fitness		Katie Archibald; Pearl Izumi		Manon Lloyd	

=== Para-cycling Events ===
A series of para-cycling national championships are also held over combined categories using a points system.

Event	Gold		Silver		Bronze	
Para-cycling Events
BVI Mixed Gender 1000m	Helen Scott and Sophie Thornhill		Neil Fachie and Peter Mitchell		Laura Cluxton and Lyndsey Carson	
C1-5 Mixed Gender Sprint Time Trial	Kadeena Cox		Lauren Booth; Carnac-Planet X		Megan Giglia*	
*Factored event. The bronze medal originally awarded to Rik Waddon, but reawarded after recalculation to Megan Giglia.
BVI Mixed Gender Para Pursuit	Lora Turnham and Corrine Hall	04:14.030 F.T. 03:37.120 A.T.	Stephen Bate and Adam Duggleby	04:22.100	Laura Cluxton and Lyndsey Carson	04:37.912 F.T. 03:57.532 A.T.
* F.T. Factored time. A.T. Actual Time
C1-5 Mixed Gender Para Pursuit	Jonathan Gildea	4.46.017	Megan Giglia	4.46.211	Louis Rolfe	4.50.622
BVI Mixed Gender 200m flying lap	Sophie Thornhill; Helen Scott		Neil Fachie; Peter Mitchell		Lydia Hayden; Leanne Hall	
C1-5 Mixed Gender 200m flying lap	Jody Cundy	10.380 F.T. 10.531 A.T.	Jon-Allan Butterworth	10.609	Lauren Booth	11.899F.T. 13.762 A.T.

A.T. = Actual Time F.T. = Factored time
