= Natalie Redmond =

Australian cyclist

Personal information
- Full name: Natalie Redmond
- Born: 4 August 1991 (age 35)

Cycling career
- Sport: Cycling
- Disciplines: Cyclo-cross; Road
- Role: Rider

Amateur teams
- 2017–2018: Ozriders Cannondale SRAM
- 2019: Port Adelaide Cycling Club
- 2019: Fearless Femme

Professional team
- 2019: Drops

Natalie Redmond (born 4 August 1991) is an Australian road and cyclo-cross cyclist, who last rode for UCI Women's Team Drops. She represented her nation in the women's elite event at the 2016 UCI Cyclo-cross World Championships in Heusden-Zolder.
