= Nicole Moerig =

Australian cyclist (born 1984)

Personal information
- Full name: Nicole Moerig
- Born: 4 April 1984 (age 42)
- Height: 163 cm (5 ft 4 in)

Cycling career
- Sport: Cycling
- Current team: Retired
- Discipline: Road
- Role: Rider

Professional team
- 2016: Podium Ambition Pro Cycling

Nicole Moerig (born 4 April 1984) is an Australian former road cyclist. She became a full-time professional cyclist with Podium Ambition Pro Cycling in 2016, competing in road races such as the Tour of California, Silver City's Tour of the Gila, the Tour de Bretagne Féminin, and the 2016 Women's Tour de Yorkshire.

== Biography ==
Nicole Moerig was born on 4 April 1984. She worked as a science and physical education teacher at Grace Lutheran College in Redcliffe, Queensland, and lives in Byron Bay, New South Wales.

As a teenager, Moerig competed in cross country running. In her early 20s she became involved in triathlon. Finally she switched to road cycling. She began competing at a national level in 2011. She was signed to a professional team, Pensar-SPM Racing, which won the Australian National Road Series in 2012. She broke her collar bone in January 2014 while competing in the Santos Women's Tour Down Under. This forced her to take six months off from cycling.

In 2015, Moerig took five months off from work to go cycling in Europe, the United States and Canada at her own expense. While in Europe she rode for a British team in the Thüringen Rundfahrt der Frauen, a seven-day UCI Stage Race in Germany in July 2015. This led to an offer to join Podium Ambition Pro Cycling. In 2016, her first full year as a professional cyclist, she competed in road races such as the Tour of California, Silver City's Tour of the Gila, the Tour de Bretagne Féminin, and the 2016 Women's Tour de Yorkshire, in which she was placed ninth. Her best performance was at the 2015 Oceania Continental Championships, in which she came seventh.
