= Grace Garner =

British cyclist

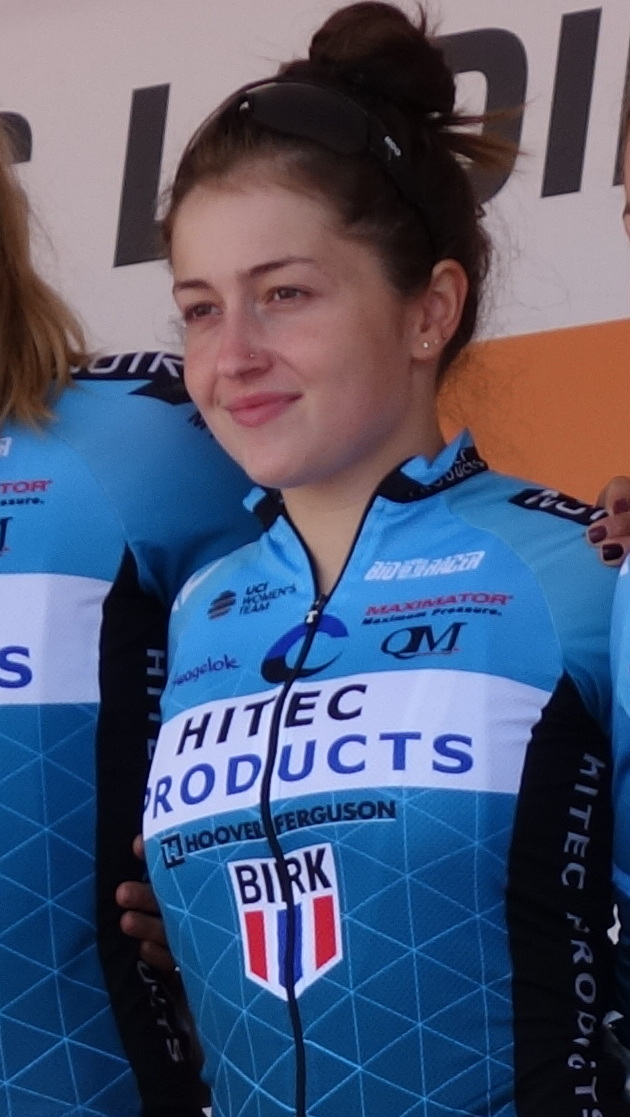
- Garner at the 2019 Holland Ladies Tour

Personal information
- Full name: Grace Fenton Garner
- Born: 19 June 1997 (age 29) Leicester, Leicestershire, England

Cycling career
- Sport: Cycling
- Current team: Retired
- Discipline: Road
- Role: Rider

Amateur teams
- 2006–2010: Leicestershire Road Club
- 2011–2014: Cero–Cycle Division Racing Team
- 2013–2014: RST Racing Team
- 2015: Team Giordana–Triton
- 2015: RST Racing Team

Professional teams
- 2016: Podium Ambition Pro Cycling
- 2017–2018: Wiggle High5
- 2019: Hitec Products–Birk Sport
- 2020: CAMS–Tifosi

Grace Fenton Garner (born 19 June 1997) is an English former professional racing cyclist, who rode professionally between 2016 and 2020, for the Podium Ambition Pro Cycling, Wiggle High5, Hitec Products–Birk Sport and CAMS–Tifosi teams. Her older sister Lucy van der Haar also competed professionally in cycling, before also retiring in 2020.

== Career ==
Garner was educated at Countesthorpe Leysland Community College. In 2015, Garner won 2 stages and the Points classification at Rás na mBan in Ireland, finished sixth in the Women's Tour de Yorkshire, and seventh in the junior road race at the UCI Road World Championships. She turned professional with the Podium Ambition Pro Cycling team in 2016: after the team folded at the end of the season she joined Wiggle High5 for the 2017 season. As part of the National Women's Road race series, Garner won the Essex Giro. When Wiggle High5 folded at the end of 2018, both Garner sisters joined Hitec Products–Birk Sport for 2019.

Garner retired from cycling at the end of the 2020 season.

== See also ==
- List of 2016 UCI Women's Teams and riders
