= Amy Gornall =

British cyclist

Personal information
- Born: 13 September 1996 (age 30)

Cycling career
- Sport: Cycling
- Role: Rider

Amy Gornall (born 13 September 1996) is a British professional racing cyclist who rides for Podium Ambition Pro Cycling.

== See also ==
- List of 2016 UCI Women's Teams and riders
