= Jessie Walker =

English cyclist (born 1994)

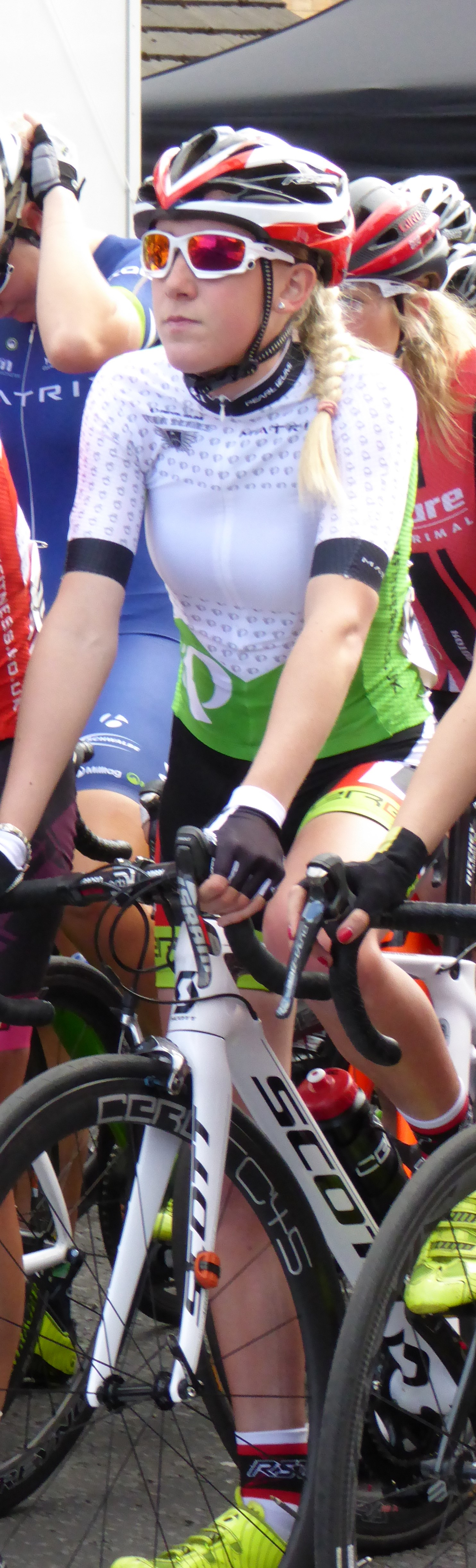
- Walker in 2015

Personal information
- Full name: Jessie Elizabeth Walker
- Born: 20 September 1994 (age 32) Sheffield, England

Cycling career
- Sport: Cycling
- Current team: Retired
- Role: Rider

Professional teams
- 2012–May 2015: Matrix Fitness–Prendas
- May 2015 – June 2015: RST Racing Team
- June 2015–2016: Servetto Footon

Jessie Walker (born 20 September 1994) is an English professional racing cyclist. After riding for the Matrix Fitness Pro Cycling team for four seasons, she joined the RST Racing Team in May 2015. However, in June 2015 she joined Servetto Footon for the remainder of the 2015 season. In October 2016 she announced that she would take a break from racing in the 2017 season after her time with Servetto Footon, which she described as "frustrating" and "demoralising" due to a lack of support from the team, stating that she had not been paid by them, and had depended on financial support from the Dave Rayner Fund. After splitting from Servetto Footon, she joined Team WNT as a soigneur for 2017, before moving on to studying art and design at the end of the season.

She is the daughter of racing cyclist Chris Walker.

== See also ==
- List of 2015 UCI Women's Teams and riders
