= Macey Stewart =

Australian cyclist (born 1996)

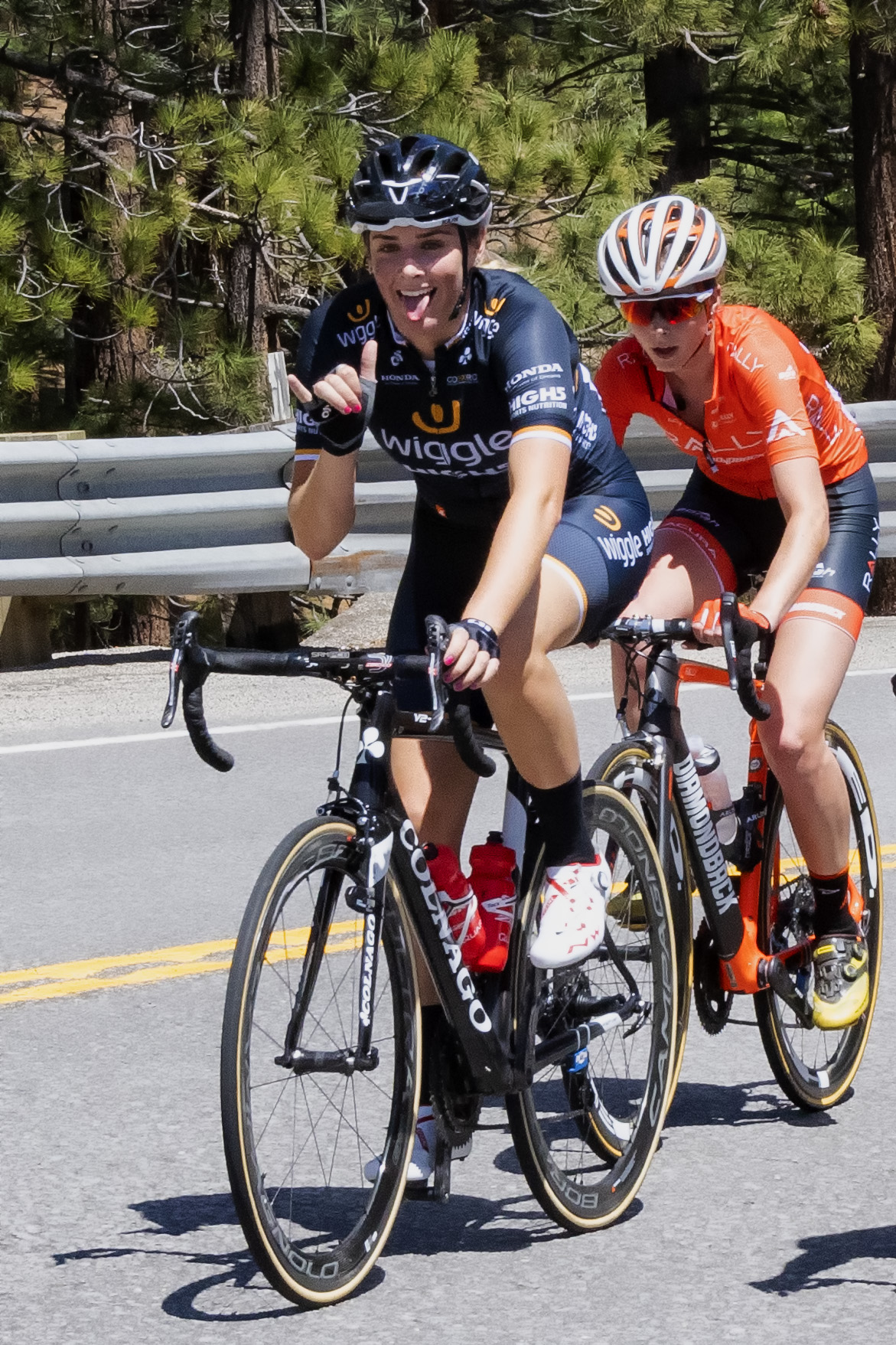
- Stewart at the 2018 Tour of California

Personal information
- Born: 16 January 1996 (age 30) Devonport, Tasmania

Cycling career
- Sport: Cycling
- Current team: Retired
- Disciplines: Road and track
- Role: Rider
- Rider type: Sprinter (Road); Endurance (Track)

Professional teams
- 2015–2016: Orica–AIS
- 2017: TIS Racing
- 2018: Wiggle High5

Macey Stewart (born 16 January 1996) is an Australian professional racing cyclist. She joined the Orica–AIS team in 2015. Stewart took two gold medals at the 2014 UCI Juniors Track World Championships, in the omnium and as part of the successful Australian team pursuit squad, and went on to win the junior time trial at the 2014 UCI Road World Championships in Ponferrada.

== Major results ==
2015
Oceania Track Championships

1st Points Race
2nd Individual Pursuit
2nd Team Pursuit (with Georgia Baker, Lauren Perry and Elissa Wundersitz)

2017
3rd Omnium, ITS Melbourne – Hisense Grand Prix

== See also ==
- List of 2015 UCI Women's Teams and riders
