= Podium Ambition Pro Cycling =

British cycling team

Podium Ambition Pro Cycling p/b Club La Santa
Team information
- Registered: United Kingdom
- Founded: 2013
- Disbanded: 2016
- Discipline: Road
- Status: National (2013–2015); UCI Women (2016)

Team name history
- 2013 2014 2015 2016: Breast Cancer Care Cycling Team; Madison–Boot Out Breast Cancer Care; Pearl Izumi–Boot out Breast Cancer; Podium Ambition Pro Cycling p/b Club La Santa

Podium Ambition Pro Cycling powered by Club La Santa was a UCI Women's cycling team based in the United Kingdom, founded in 2013. The team folded at the end of 2016.

== Major wins ==
2014
Stage 2 Tour de Bretagne, Sarah Storey
UCI Track World Cup – Guadalajara (Team Pursuit), Ciara Horne
UCI Track World Cup – Guadalajara (Team Pursuit), Katie Archibald
UCI Track World Cup – London (Team Pursuit), Ciara Horne
UCI Track World Cup – London (Team Pursuit), Katie Archibald
2015
Dudenhofen Omnium, Katie Archibald
Cheshire Classic, Sarah Storey
London Nocturne, Katie Archibald

== National, continental and world champions ==
2014
World Track (Team Pursuit), Katie Archibald
British Track (Individual Pursuit), Katie Archibald
British Track (Points race), Sarah Storey
European Track (Team Pursuit), Ciara Horne
European Track (Team Pursuit), Katie Archibald
European Track (Individual Pursuit), Katie Archibald
2015
British Track, (Team Pursuit), Sarah Storey
British Track, (Team Pursuit), Joanna Rowsell
British Track, (Team Pursuit), Horne
British Track, (Team Pursuit), Katie Archibald
European Track (Team Pursuit), Joanna Rowsell
European Track (Team Pursuit), Katie Archibald
European Track (Individual Pursuit), Katie Archibald
2016
European Track (Omnium), Katie Archibald
European Track (Individual Pursuit), Katie Archibald

== Team roster 2016 ==
As of 1 January 2016. Ages as of 1 January 2016.

Rider	Date of birth
Katie Archibald (GBR)	12 March 1994 (aged 21)
Lauren Creamer (IRL)	20 January 1992 (aged 23)
Katie Curtis (GBR)	1 November 1988 (aged 27)
Neah Evans (GBR)	1 August 1990 (aged 25)
Grace Garner (GBR)	19 June 1997 (aged 18)
Amy Gornall (GBR)	13 September 1996 (aged 19)
Elizabeth-Jane Harris (GBR)	7 January 1988 (aged 27)

Rider	Date of birth
Bethany Hayward (GBR)	20 November 1996 (aged 19)
Hayley Jones (GBR)	26 September 1995 (aged 20)
Sharon Laws (GBR)	7 July 1974 (aged 41)
Nicole Moerig (AUS)	4 April 1984 (aged 31)
Claire Rose (GBR)	23 May 1987 (aged 28)
Joanna Rowsell-Shand (GBR)	5 December 1988 (aged 27)
Sarah Storey (GBR)	26 October 1977 (aged 38)
