= Christa Riffel =

German cyclist (born 1998)

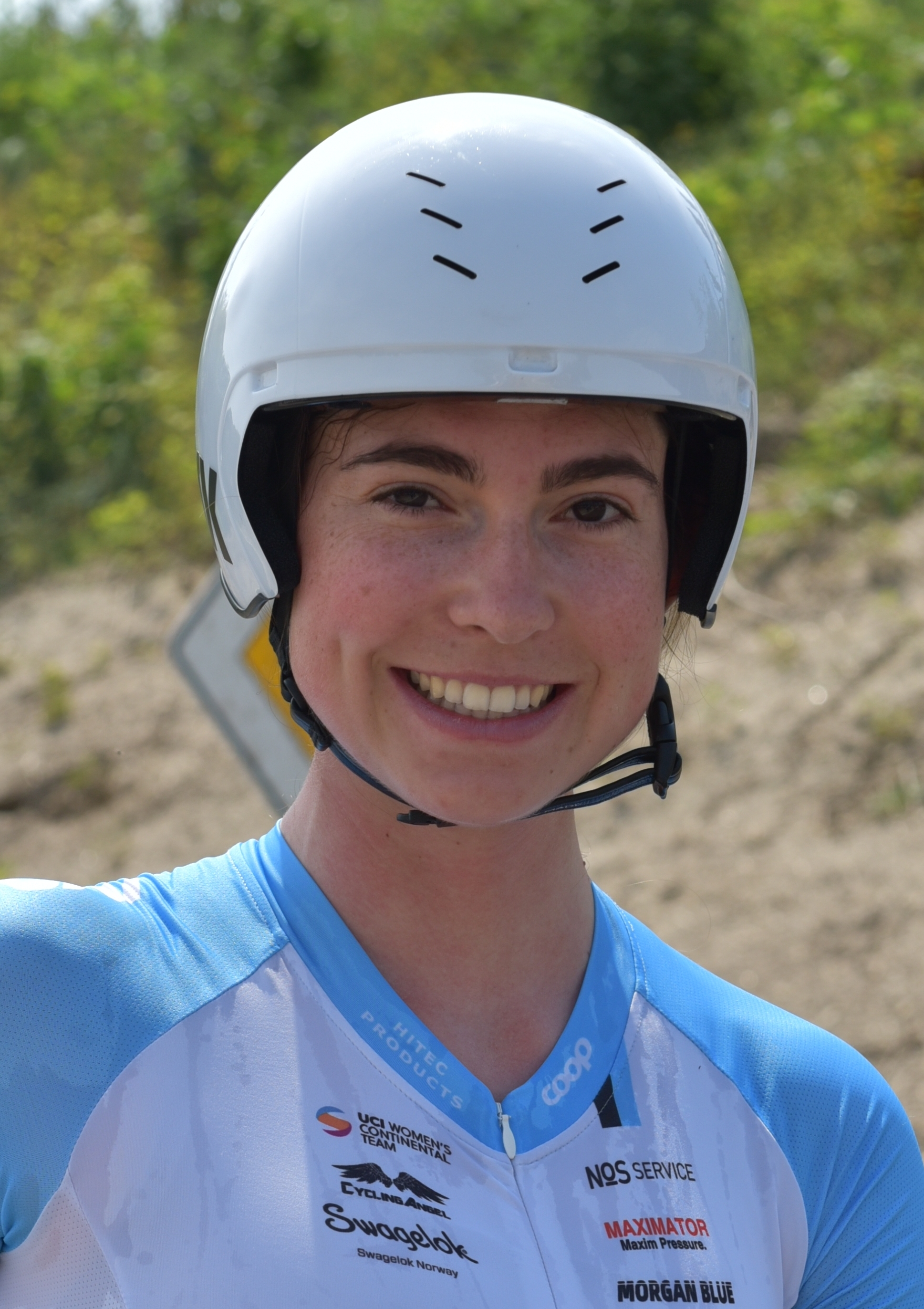
- Riffel in 2022

Personal information
- Full name: Christa Riffel
- Born: 30 July 1998 (age 28) Karlsruhe, Germany

Cycling career
- Sport: Cycling
- Current team: Hitec Products–Fluid Control
- Discipline: Road
- Role: Rider

Amateur teams
- 2012–2017: RSV Edelweiß Oberhausen
- 2017: Canyon//SRAM (stagiaire)

Professional teams
- 2018–2020: Canyon//SRAM
- 2021–: Team Hitec Products

Christa Riffel (born 30 July 1998) is a German racing cyclist, who currently rides for UCI Women's Continental Team Hitec Products–Fluid Control. She rode in the women's road race event at the 2018 UCI Road World Championships.
