= María Calderón Fernandez =

Spanish cyclist

Personal information
- Born: 23 March 1997 (age 29)

Cycling career
- Sport: Cycling
- Role: Rider

María Calderón Fernandez (born 23 March 1997) is a Spanish professional racing cyclist who rides for Lointek.

== See also ==
- List of 2016 UCI Women's Teams and riders
