= List of career achievements by Annemiek van Vleuten =

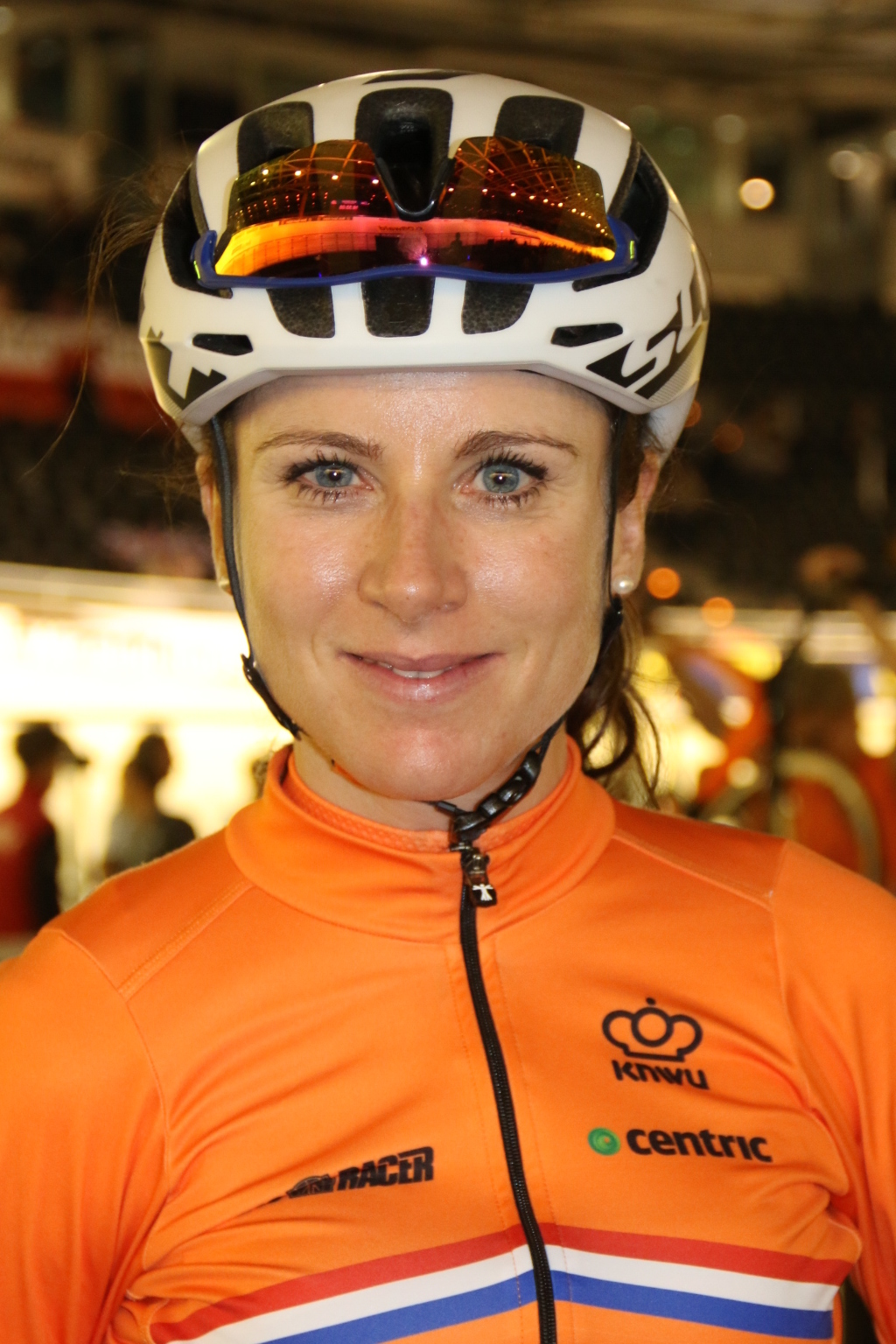
Since beginning her cycling career, Annemiek van Vleuten has taken nearly 100 professional race victories and is a three-time winner of the Dutch women's cyclist of the year.

This is a list of career achievements by Annemiek van Vleuten, a Dutch professional racing cyclist for UCI Women's Team, Movistar Team.

== Major results ==
=== Road ===
2008
World University Championships

2nd Time trial
3rd Road race

5th Overall Ster Zeeuwsche Eilanden
6th Grand Prix Elsy Jacobs
6th Therme Kasseien Omloop
2009
1st Ronde van Rijssen
1st Klever Radrennen
9th Omloop door Middag-Humsterland
10th Overall Holland Ladies Tour
2010
1st Overall La Route de France

1st Stage 3

1st Novilon Eurocup Ronde van Drenthe
1st Ronde van Barendrecht
2nd Overall Gracia–Orlová

1st Stage 2

2nd Overall Iurreta-Emakumeen Bira

1st Stage 4

2nd Ronde van Drenthe
3rd Overall Ster Zeeuwsche Eilanden
3rd Drentse 8 van Dwingeloo
3rd GP Stad Roeselare
3rd GP Ciudad de Valladolid
3rd Emakumeen Saria
3rd Open de Suède Vårgårda TTT
4th Open de Suède Vårgårda
5th Overall Tour de l'Aude Cycliste Féminin
7th Overall Holland Ladies Tour
7th Overall Giro della Toscana Int. Femminile – Memorial Michela Fanini
7th Ronde van Gelderland
8th Grand Prix de Dottignies
10th Tour of Flanders
2011
1st Overall UCI World Cup
1st Tour of Flanders
1st Open de Suède Vårgårda
1st GP de Plouay – Bretagne
2nd Overall Tour of Chongming Island Stage race
2nd 7-Dorpenomloop Aalburg
3rd Overall Trophée d'Or Féminin
3rd Trofeo Alfredo Binda
3rd Grand Prix de Dottignies
3rd Finale Lotto Cycling Cup - Breendonk
4th Grand Prix Elsy Jacobs
4th Grand-prix Nicolas Frantz
4th Tour of Chongming Island
5th Open de Suède Vårgårda TTT
6th Omloop Het Nieuwsblad
6th Ronde van Drenthe
6th La Flèche Wallonne
9th Overall Holland Ladies Tour
10th Durango-Durango Emakumeen Saria
2012
National Championships

1st Road race
2nd Time trial

1st GP Stad Roeselare
1st Holland Hills Classic
1st 7-Dorpenomloop Aalburg
2nd Overall Festival Elsy Jacobs

1st Prologue & Stage 2

3rd Overall Emakumeen Euskal Bira

1st Points classification
1st Stage 4

3rd GP Comune di Cornaredo
5th Durango-Durango Emakumeen Saria
6th Overall Giro della Toscana Int. Femminile – Memorial Michela Fanini

1st Points classification
1st Prologue

2013
1st Ronde van Geldrop
1st Ronde van Rijssen
1st Omloop der Kempen
1st Prologue Festival Elsy Jacobs
1st Stage 3 Thüringen Rundfahrt
2nd Team time trial, UCI World Championships
2nd Overall Holland Ladies Tour
2nd Open de Suède Vårgårda TTT
National Championships

3rd Road race
3rd Time trial

3rd Holland Hills Classic
4th Omloop Het Nieuwsblad
5th Tour of Flanders
6th Durango-Durango Emakumeen Saria
7th Trofeo Alfredo Binda
8th EPZ Omloop van Borsele
9th 7-Dorpenomloop Aalburg
9th GP de Plouay
10th Overall Trophée d'Or Féminin

1st Stage 6

10th Ronde van Gelderland
2014
National Championships

1st Time trial
4th Road race

1st Overall Belgium Tour

1st Prologue, Stages 1 & 2 (TTT)

2nd Open de Suède Vårgårda TTT
5th Ronde van Drenthe World Cup
5th Tour of Flanders
6th Omloop van het Hageland
6th Ronde van Gelderland
6th Ronde van Overijssel
6th Durango-Durango Emakumeen Saria
7th Open de Suède Vårgårda
8th Overall Giro d'Italia

1st Prologue & Stage 3

9th Overall Ladies Tour of Norway
9th Omloop Het Nieuwsblad
10th EPZ Omloop van Borsele
2015
1st Prologue Giro d'Italia
2nd Overall Festival Luxembourgeois du cyclisme féminin Elsy Jacobs
2nd La Flèche Wallonne
European Games

3rd Time trial
7th Road race

National Championships

3rd Road race
6th Time trial

3rd Overall Giro della Toscana Int. Femminile – Memorial Michela Fanini

1st Prologue

3rd Acht van Westerveld
4th Tour of Flanders
7th Overall Emakumeen Euskal Bira

1st Prologue

7th Trofeo Alfredo Binda
9th Strade Bianche
10th Overall Holland Ladies Tour
2016
1st Time trial, National Championships
1st Overall Belgium Tour

1st Mountains classification
1st Prologue & Stage 3

2nd Overall Energiewacht Tour
2nd Holland Hills Classic
3rd Overall Auensteiner–Radsporttage

1st Stage 2a (ITT)

4th Overall Thüringen Rundfahrt
5th UCI Road World Championships – Women's time trial
6th Omloop van het Hageland
6th Gent–Wevelgem
7th Strade Bianche
7th Tour of Flanders
8th Trofeo Alfredo Binda
9th Overall Festival Luxembourgeois du cyclisme féminin Elsy Jacobs

1st Points classification
1st Prologue

9th Ronde van Drenthe
9th Omloop van Borsele
2017
1st UCI Road World Championships – Women's time trial
1st Time trial, National Championships
1st Overall Holland Ladies Tour

1st Prologue & Stage 3 (ITT)

1st Cadel Evans Great Ocean Road Race
1st Durango-Durango Emakumeen Saria
1st La Course by Le Tour de France
2nd Overall Emakumeen Euskal Bira

1st Stage 4

3rd Overall Giro d'Italia

1st Points classification
1st Mountains classification
1st Stages 2 & 5 (ITT)

3rd Omloop Het Nieuwsblad
3rd Amstel Gold Race
4th UCI Road World Championships – Women's road race
4th Tour of Flanders
4th La Flèche Wallonne
5th Strade Bianche
5th Ronde van Drenthe
5th Liège–Bastogne–Liège
6th Trofeo Alfredo Binda
2018
1st UCI Road World Championships – Women's time trial
1st Overall UCI World Tour
1st Overall Giro Rosa

1st Points classification
1st Stages 7 (ITT), 9 & 10

1st Overall Holland Ladies Tour

1st Points classification
1st Prologue, Stages 1 & 5 (ITT)

1st La Course by Le Tour de France
1st Veenendaal–Veenendaal Classic
2nd Overall Emakumeen Euskal Bira

1st Stage 2 (ITT)

2nd Overall Herald Sun Tour

1st Stage 2 (ITT)

2nd Durango-Durango Emakumeen Saria
2nd Team time trial, Tour of Norway
3rd Tour of Flanders
3rd Liège–Bastogne–Liège
4th La Flèche Wallonne
4th Time trial, National Championships
5th Dwars door Vlaanderen
6th Overall Tour Down Under
7th UCI Road World Championships – Women's road race
2019
1st UCI Road World Championships – Women's road race
National Championships

1st Time trial
4th Road race

1st Overall Giro Rosa

1st Points classification
1st Mountains classification
1st Stages 5 & 6 (ITT)

1st Strade Bianche
1st Liège–Bastogne–Liège
2nd Tour of Flanders
2nd Amstel Gold Race
2nd La Flèche Wallonne
3rd UCI Road World Championships – Women's time trial
4th Omloop Het Nieuwsblad
6th Overall Emakumeen Euskal Bira
6th Overall Holland Ladies Tour

1st Prologue

7th Dwars door Vlaanderen
7th La Course by Le Tour de France
2020
1st Road race, UEC European Championships
1st Omloop Het Nieuwsblad
1st Emakumeen Nafarroako Klasikoa
1st Clasica Femenina Navarra
1st Durango-Durango Emakumeen Saria
1st Strade Bianche
1st Stage 2 Giro Rosa
2nd Road race, UCI World Championships
2nd Road race, National Championships
5th La Course by Le Tour de France
6th Overall Challenge by La Vuelta
2021
Olympic Games

1st Time trial
2nd Road race

1st Overall UCI World Tour
1st Overall Setmana Ciclista Valenciana

1st Stage 1

1st Overall Tour of Norway

1st Stage 3

1st Overall Challenge by La Vuelta

1st Stages 2 (ITT) & 3

1st Dwars door Vlaanderen
1st Tour of Flanders
1st Donostia San Sebastián Klasikoa
1st Emakumeen Nafarroako Klasikoa
2nd UCI Road World Championships – Mixed team relay
2nd Overall Vuelta a Burgos
2nd Liège–Bastogne–Liège
2nd Gran Premio Ciudad de Eibar
2nd Durango-Durango Emakumeen Saria
3rd UCI Road World Championships – Women's time trial
3rd Amstel Gold Race
3rd Clasica Femenina Navarra
4th Time trial, National Championships
4th Strade Bianche
4th La Flèche Wallonne
9th Road race, UEC European Championships
2022
1st UCI Road World Championships – Women's road race
1st Overall UCI World Tour
1st Overall Tour de France

1st Stages 7 & 8
Combativity award Stage 7

1st Overall Giro Donne

1st Points classification
1st Stages 4 & 8

1st Overall Challenge by La Vuelta

1st Stage 2

1st Overall Setmana Ciclista Valenciana

1st Stage 3

1st Omloop Het Nieuwsblad
1st Liège–Bastogne–Liège
2nd Overall Tour de Romandie
2nd Strade Bianche
2nd Tour of Flanders
2nd La Flèche Wallonne
4th Amstel Gold Race
7th UCI Road World Championships – Women's time trial
2023
1st Overall Giro Donne

1st Points classification
1st Mountains classification
1st Stages 2, 6 & 7

1st Overall La Vuelta Femenina
1st Overall Tour of Scandinavia
National Championships

3rd Time trial
5th Road race

4th Overall Tour de France
4th Overall Setmana Ciclista Valenciana
4th Strade Bianche
5th Overall Itzulia Women
6th Liège–Bastogne–Liège
7th La Flèche Wallonne
8th Road race, UCI World Championships

==== General classification results timeline ====
Major Tours	2008	2009	2010	2011	2012	2013	2014	2015	2016	2017	2018	2019	2020	2021	2022	2023
La Vuelta Femenina	Race did not exist															1
Giro Donne	—	—	27	75	DNF	DNF	8	35	—	3	1	1	DNF	—	1	1
Tour de France Femmes	Race did not exist														1	4
Stage race	2008	2009	2010	2011	2012	2013	2014	2015	2016	2017	2018	2019	2020	2021	2022	2023
Grand Prix Elsy Jacobs	6	—	—	4	2	22	—	2	9	—	—	—	NH	—	—	—
Emakumeen Euskal Bira	—	31	2	DNF	3	33	12	7	—	2	2	6	Race no longer exists			
The Women's Tour	Race did not exist						15	—	—	—	—	—	NH	—	—	NH
Thüringen Rundfahrt	—	—	—	—	—	11	—	—	4	—	—	—	NH	—	—	—
Ladies Tour of Norway	Race did not exist						9	—	—	—	19	—	NH	1	NH	
Holland Ladies Tour	14	10	7	9	12	2	—	10	—	1	1	6	NH	—	—	57
Belgium Tour	Race did not exist				—	—	1	—	1	—	—	—	NH	—	—	NH
Tour de Romandie	Race did not exist														2	—
Challenge by La Vuelta	Race did not exist							One day race			—	—	6	1	1	NH

==== Classics results timeline ====
Monuments	2008	2009	2010	2011	2012	2013	2014	2015	2016	2017	2018	2019	2020	2021	2022	2023
Tour of Flanders	89	30	10	1	DNF	5	5	4	7	4	3	2	15	1	2	27
Paris–Roubaix	Race did not exist												NH	DNF	—	—
Liege–Bastogne–Liege	Race did not exist									5	3	1	28	2	1	6
Classic	2008	2009	2010	2011	2012	2013	2014	2015	2016	2017	2018	2019	2020	2021	2022	2023
Omloop Het Nieuwsblad	47	24	—	6	—	4	9	18	12	3	36	4	1	21	1	66
Strade Bianche	Race did not exist							9	7	5	—	1	1	4	2	4
Ronde van Drenthe	—	38	2	6	—	13	5	13	9	5	—	—	NH	—	—	—
Trofeo Alfredo Binda	41	19	40	3	13	7	43	7	8	6	—	—	NH	—	—	—
Gent–Wevelgem	Race did not exist				—	—	—	—	6	14	63	—	—	—	—	—
Amstel Gold Race	Race did not exist									3	15	2	NH	3	4	11
La Flèche Wallonne	—	—	12	6	13	—	38	2	14	4	4	2	—	4	2	7
GP de Plouay	—	—	22	1	—	9	—	—	—	—	—	—	51	—	—	
Open de Suède Vårgårda	28	14	4	1	—	61	7	—	—	—	—	—	Not held		—	NH
Clásica de San Sebastián	Race did not exist											16	NH	1	NH	

==== Major championship results timeline ====
Event		2007	2008	2009	2010	2011	2012	2013	2014	2015	2016	2017	2018	2019	2020	2021	2022	2023
Olympic Games	Time trial	NH	—	Not held			—	Not held			—	Not held				1	NH	
Olympic Games	Road race	NH	—	Not held			14	Not held			DNF	Not held				2	NH	
World Championships	Time trial	—	—	—	—	—	—	—	—	—	5	1	1	3	—	3	7	—
World Championships	Road race	—	—	—	25	24	11	15	—	—	52	4	7	1	2	19	1	8
World Championships	Team time trial	Race did not exist					4	2	—	—	—	—	—	Not held				
World Championships	Mixed team relay	Race did not exist												—	NH	2	5	—
European Championships	Time trial	Elite race did not exist								—	—	—	—	—	—	—	—	—
European Championships	Road race	Elite race did not exist								—	—	—	—	—	1	9	—	—
European Games	Time trial	Event did not exist								3	Not held			—	Not held			
European Games	Road race	Event did not exist								7	Not held			—	Not held			
National Championships	Time trial	15	7	10	4	—	2	3	1	6	1	1	4	1	NH	4	—	3
National Championships	Road race	40	12	7	9	8	1	3	4	3	7	6	6	4	2	11	—	5

Legend
—	Did not compete
DNF	Did not finish
NH	Not held

=== Track ===
2017
2nd Individual pursuit, UCI World Cup, Pruszków
2018
2nd Individual pursuit, UCI World Championships

== Awards ==
Van Vleuten is a three-time winner of the Keetie van Oosten-Hage Trophy, awarded to the best Dutch women's cyclist of the year, winning the award in 2017, 2019 and 2021. In 2022, Van Vleuten won the first Vélo d'Or for women.
