= Chantal van den Broek-Blaak =

Dutch cyclist (born 1989)

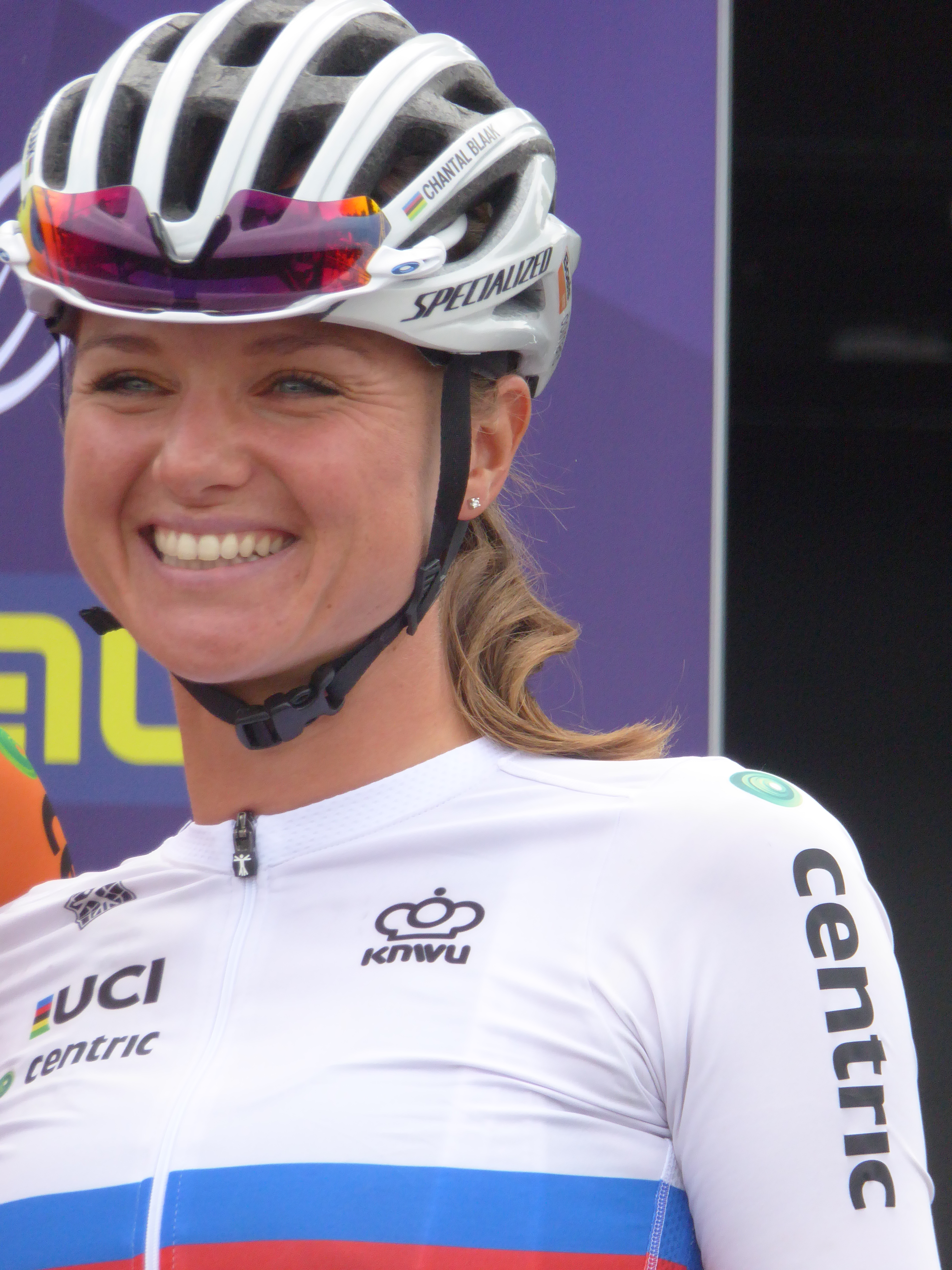
- Van den Broek-Blaak at the 2018 European Road Cycling Championships.

Personal information
- Full name: Chantal van den Broek-Blaak
- Nickname: Blaaki
- Born: Chantal Blaak; 22 October 1989 (age 36) Zuidland, Netherlands
- Height: 1.76 m (5 ft 9 in)

Cycling career
- Sport: Cycling
- Current team: Team SD Worx–Protime
- Discipline: Road
- Role: Retired
- Rider type: Classics specialist

Professional teams
- 2008–2012: AA-Drink Cycling Team
- 2013: Team TIBCO–To The Top
- 2014: Specialized–lululemon
- 2015–2024: Boels–Dolmans

Major wins
- Stage races Holland Ladies Tour (2016, 2021) One-day races and Classics World Road Race Championships (2017) National Road Race Championships (2017, 2018, 2024) Tour of Flanders (2020) Omloop Het Nieuwsblad (2019) Strade Bianche (2021) Gent–Wevelgem (2016) Amstel Gold Race (2018) Le Samyn (2015, 2016, 2020) Ronde van Drenthe (2016) Drentse 8 (2014, 2021) Open de Suède Vårgårda (2014)
Medal record
Representing the Netherlands
Women's road cycling
World Championships
Gold medal – first place	2017 Bergen	Road Race
European Games
Silver medal – second place	2019 Minsk	Time trial
Representing Specialized–lululemon
World Championships
Gold medal – first place	2014 Ponferrada	Team time trial

Chantal van den Broek-Blaak (née Blaak; born 22 October 1989) is a Dutch road racing cyclist, who last rode for UCI Women's WorldTeam Team SD Worx–Protime. In 2017 she became world road race champion in Bergen, Norway. Van den Broek-Blaak also won several classic one-day races including Tour of Flanders, Amstel Gold Race and Strade Bianche. She retired in January 2025.

== Career ==
=== Junior career ===
Van den Broek-Blaak was the Dutch national junior time trial champion in 2006 and 2007. She was European under-23 road race champion in 2009 and was also third in the Ronde van Drenthe race of the UCI Women's Road World Cup in that year.

=== Professional career ===
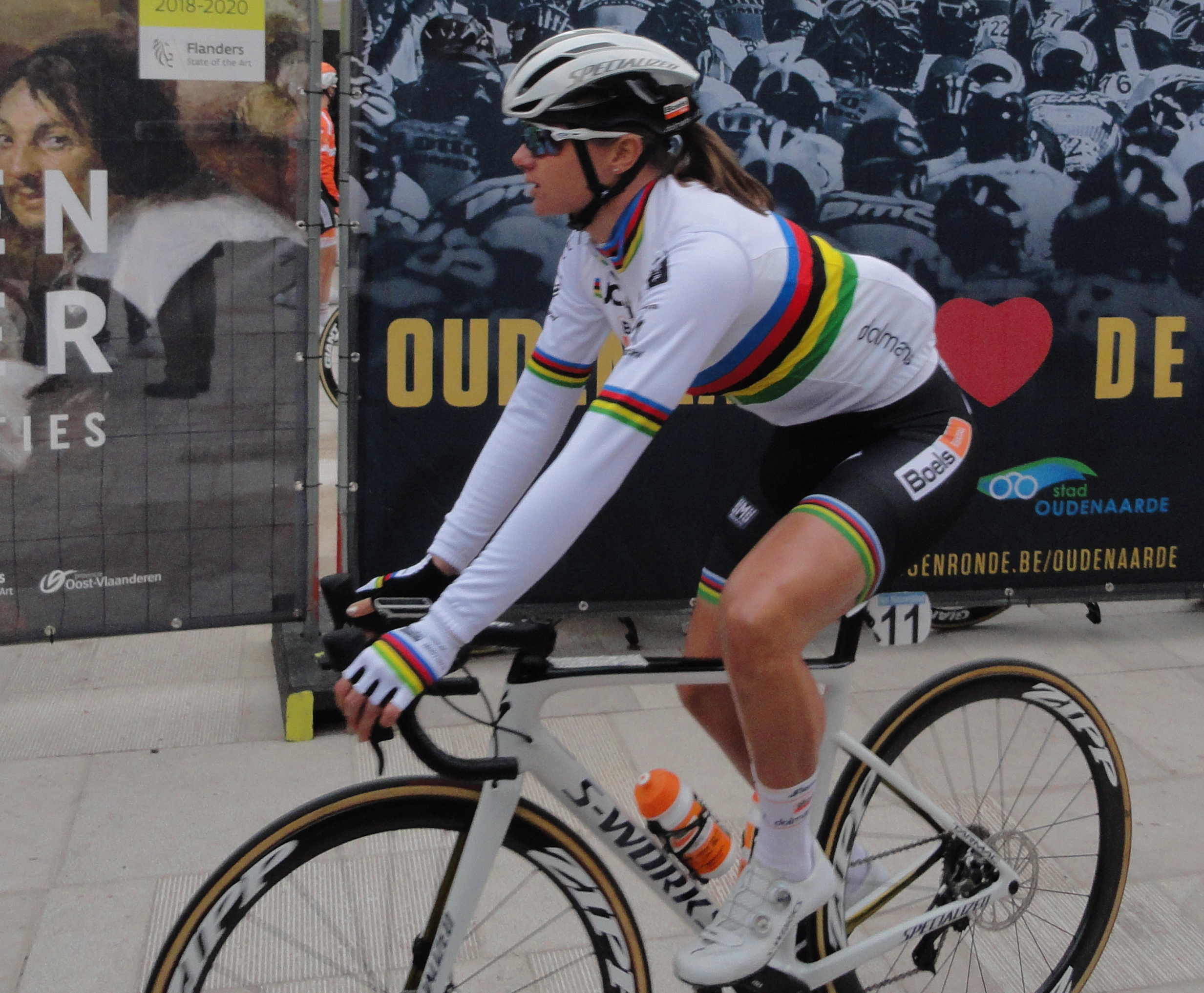
Van den Broek-Blaak wearing the rainbow jersey at the start of the 2018 Tour of Flanders

Van den Broek-Blaak began her professional career in 2008 with the Dutch AA-Drink Cycling Team and remained with them until they disbanded at the end of 2012, after which she raced for the US team Team TIBCO–To The Top for a year.

In 2014, she joined Specialized–lululemon and won her first UCI Women's Road World Cup race, the Open de Suède Vårgårda.

She transferred to the Boels–Dolmans team for 2015, along with sponsors Specialized Bicycle Components and lululemon Athletica and teammate Evelyn Stevens. She won the 2015 Le Samyn des Dames.

2016 was her most successful season to date, yielding wins in Le Samyn des Dames, the Ronde van Drenthe, Gent–Wevelgem and the Holland Ladies Tour.

In 2017, van den Broek-Blaak became both Dutch national and world road race champion after she successfully broke away from an elite group of riders 8 kilometres (5.0 miles) from the finish. In the rainbow jersey, she won the Amstel Gold Race in 2018.

2019 saw Chantal Blaak win Omloop Het Nieuwsblad for the first time. In 2020, she enhanced her resume by winning the Tour of Flanders for Women. A year later, she won Strade Bianche Women.

She sat out of the 2023 season after announcing her pregnancy in January at her team's presentation. She returned to racing in 2024, becoming Dutch national champion for the third time.

In January 2025, she announced her retirement as she is expecting a second child – having originally planned to retire at the end of the 2025 season.

== Personal life ==
In the 2019 off-season, Chantal Blaak married former cyclist Lars van den Broek.

== Major results ==
2007
1st Time trial, National Junior Road Championships
UCI Juniors World Championships

5th Time trial
10th Road race

2008
6th Ronde van Gelderland
2009
1st Road race, UEC European Under-23 Road Championships
2nd Road race, National Road Championships
3rd Grand Prix de Dottignies
3rd Ronde van Drenthe
4th Omloop Het Nieuwsblad
7th Omloop van Borsele
8th Overall Holland Ladies Tour
8th Trofeo Alfredo Binda
10th Ronde van Gelderland
2010
2nd Holland Hills Classic
5th Ronde van Drenthe
6th Tour of Flanders
7th Open de Suède Vårgårda
9th Road race, UEC European Under-23 Road Championships
2011
1st Erondegemse Pijl
3rd Road race, National Road Championships
3rd Omloop Het Nieuwsblad
4th GP de Plouay
5th Overall Holland Ladies Tour
6th Trofeo Alfredo Binda
8th Road race, UEC European Under-23 Road Championships
10th Overall Ster Zeeuwsche Eilanden

1st Stage 2

2012
2nd Ronde van Gelderland
3rd Team time trial, UCI Road World Championships
4th EPZ Omloop van Borsele
5th Holland Hills Classic
5th 7-Dorpenomloop Aalburg
8th Overall Energiewacht Tour
2013
3rd Chrono Gatineau
5th Trofeo Alfredo Binda
7th Omloop Het Nieuwsblad
7th Grand Prix cycliste de Gatineau
8th Overall Holland Ladies Tour
9th Overall Belgium Tour
2014
1st Team time trial, UCI Road World Championships
1st Drentse 8
1st Open de Suède Vårgårda TTT
1st Open de Suède Vårgårda
1st Stage 5 Energiewacht Tour
4th Ronde van Drenthe World Cup
5th Novilon EDR Cup
7th Ronde van Overijssel
2015
1st Le Samyn
1st RaboRonde Heerlen
1st Stage 3 Emakumeen Euskal Bira
2nd Team time trial, UCI Road World Championships
2nd Omloop van het Hageland
3rd Time trial, National Road Championships
3rd Crescent Vårgårda TTT
4th Omloop Het Nieuwsblad
4th Time trial, EPZ Omloop van Borsele
5th Gooik–Geraardsbergen–Gooik
6th Holland Hills Classic
9th Tour of Flanders
9th Ronde van Overijssel
2016
1st Team time trial, UCI Road World Championships
1st Overall Holland Ladies Tour

1st Stage 2 (TTT)

1st Le Samyn
1st Ronde van Drenthe
1st Gent–Wevelgem
Crescent Vårgårda

1st Team time trial
3rd Road race

Energiewacht Tour

1st Stages 1 (TTT) & 2

2nd Time trial, National Road Championships
2nd Omloop Het Nieuwsblad
3rd Tour of Flanders
4th Madrid Challenge by La Vuelta
5th Gooik–Geraardsbergen–Gooik
6th Omloop van Borsele
2017
UCI Road World Championships

1st Road race
2nd Team time trial

1st Road race, National Road Championships
1st Crescent Vårgårda TTT
Healthy Ageing Tour

1st Stages 2 (TTT) & 4

1st Stage 1 (TTT) Giro d'Italia Femminile
2nd Omloop Het Nieuwsblad
3rd Tour of Flanders
4th Trofeo Alfredo Binda
6th Overall Holland Ladies Tour
8th Gent–Wevelgem
9th Ronde van Drenthe
2018
1st Road race, National Road Championships
1st Amstel Gold Race
1st Postnord UCI WWT Vårgårda WestSweden TTT
1st Stage 5 Holland Ladies Tour
2nd Team time trial, UCI Road World Championships
2nd Overall Healthy Ageing Tour

1st Stages 3b (TTT) & 4

2nd Trofeo Alfredo Binda
4th Strade Bianche
5th Tour of Flanders
2019
1st Omloop Het Nieuwsblad
2nd Time trial, European Games
2nd Ronde van Drenthe
7th Tour of Flanders
10th Strade Bianche
2020
1st Le Samyn des Dames
1st Tour of Flanders
4th Road race, UEC European Road Championships
4th Omloop Het Nieuwsblad
2021
1st Overall Holland Ladies Tour
1st Strade Bianche
1st Dwars door het Hageland
1st Drentse Acht van Westerveld
10th Paris–Roubaix
2022
3rd Tour of Flanders
4th Trofeo Alfredo Binda
7th Omloop van het Hageland
8th Paris–Roubaix
2024
1st Road race, National Road Championships

=== General classification results timeline ===
Grand Tour results timeline
Stage race	2010	2011	2012	2013	2014	2015	2016	2017	2018	2019	2020	2021	2022	2023	2024
Giro d'Italia Femminile	62	43	—	—	38	49	—	40	50	—	18	DNF	—	—	DNF
Tour de France Femmes	Race did not exist												49	—	—
Stage race results timeline
Stage race	2010	2011	2012	2013	2014	2015	2016	2017	2018	2019	2020	2021	2022	2023	2024
Simac Ladies Tour (Note: Known as the Boels Ladies Tour until 2020)	26	5	18	8	19	—	1	6	15	DNF	NH	1	16	—	—
Tour de Suisse	Race not held											—	—	—	59

=== Classics results timeline ===
Monument	2008	2009	2010	2011	2012	2013	2014	2015	2016	2017	2018	2019	2020	2021	2022
Tour of Flanders	DNF	34	6	24	27	40	27	9	3	3	5	7	1	19	3
Paris–Roubaix	Race did not exist												NH	10	8
Liège–Bastogne–Liège	Race did not exist									35	43	45	24	29	DNF
Classic	2008	2009	2010	2011	2012	2013	2014	2015	2016	2017	2018	2019	2020	2021	2022
Omloop Het Nieuwsblad	64	4	25	3	28	7	DNF	4	2	2	15	1	4	11	38
Strade Bianche	Race did not exist							—	—	—	4	10	29	1	16
Ronde van Drenthe	59	3	5	55	19	DNF	4	26	1	9	62	2	NH	21	—
Trofeo Alfredo Binda-Comune di Cittiglio	—	8	59	6	68	5	27	32	12	4	2	11	NH	31	4
Gent–Wevelgem	Race did not exist				—	—	—	—	1	8	31	71	—	—	44
Amstel Gold Race	Race did not exist									11	1	43	NH	52	53
La Flèche Wallonne	—	43	36	48	—	—	—	—	—	—	—	DNF	21	—	92
GP de Plouay – Bretagne	—	26	11	4	52	35	—	—	—	—	—	57	45	—	50
Open de Suède Vårgårda	DNF	DNF	7	52	—	47	1	27	3	34	44	—	Not held		57

=== Major championship results timeline ===
Event		2008	2009	2010	2011	2012	2013	2014	2015	2016	2017	2018	2019	2020	2021	2022	2023	2024
World Championships	Time trial	—	—	—	—	—	—	13	—	—	—	—	—	—	—	—	—	—
World Championships	Road race	—	23	DNF	98	—	—	17	61	50	1	44	43	12	32	—	—	—
European Championships	Road race	Race did not exist								45	62	23	28	4	DNF	—	—	—
European Games	Time trial	Event did not exist							—	Not Held			2	Not Held			—	NH
European Games	Road race	Event did not exist							DNF	Not Held			66	Not Held			—	NH
National Championships	Time trial	11	9	10	—	—	9	4	3	2	6	5	—	NH	—	—	—	—
National Championships	Road race	42	2	11	3	—	26	19	10	34	1	1	13	7	41	26	—	1

Legend
—	Did not compete
DNF	Did not finish
NH	Not held
