= 2019 Tour of Flanders for Women =

2019 UCI Women's World Tour, race 6 of 23
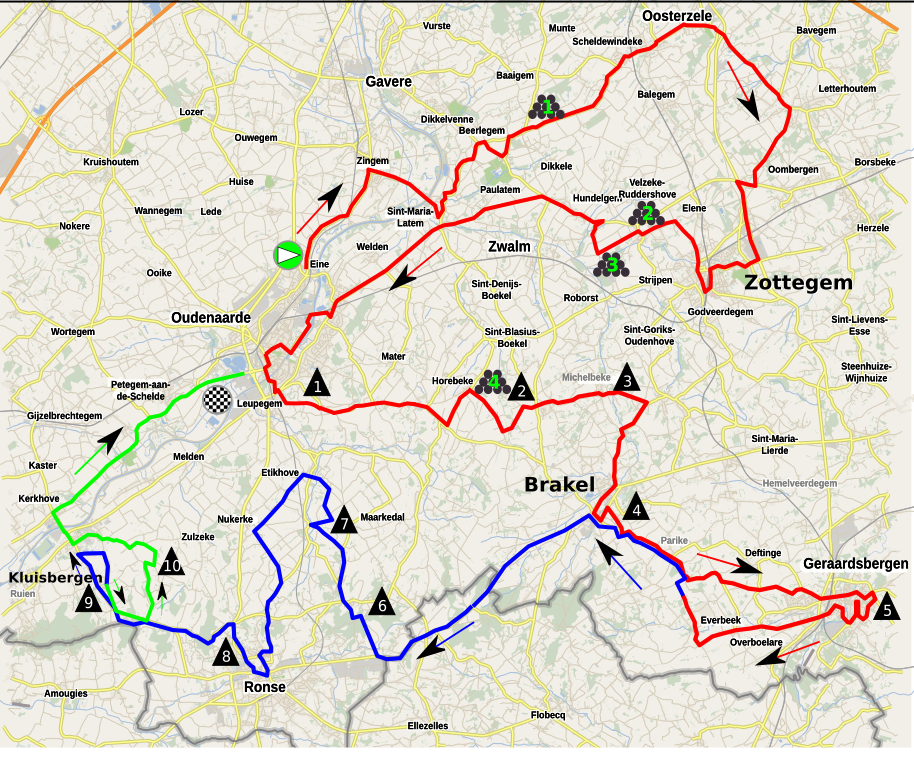
- The 2019 race is 157.4 km. Last 16 km are in green.

Race details
- Dates: 7 April 2019
- Stages: 1
- Distance: 157.4 km (97.8 mi)
- Winning time: 4h 16' 50"

Results
	Winner	Marta Bastianelli (ITA)	(Team Virtu Cycling)
	Second	Annemiek van Vleuten (NED)	(Mitchelton–Scott)
	Third	Cecilie Uttrup Ludwig (DEN)	(Bigla Pro Cycling)

Youtube race summary

The 16th running of the Tour of Flanders for Women, a women's cycling race in Belgium, was held on 7 April 2019. It was the sixth event of the 2019 UCI Women's World Tour. Anna van der Breggen was the defending champion. The race was won by Marta Bastianelli.

== Route ==
The race started and finished in Oudenaarde, in the province of East Flanders. Compared to the 2017 and 2018 event, the route is extended four kilometers, totalling 157.4 km, making it the longest women's race in the history of the Tour of Flanders. It starts in the centre of Oudenaarde, before heading east towards Zottegem where two flat cobbled sectors are addressed, and returning to Oudenaarde, after which a larger loop towards Geraardsbergen begins, which features 10 hills in the Flemish Ardennes.

After the Muur van Geraardsbergen and Kanarieberg comes the Taaienberg, which features for the first time in the women's race, coming at 40 km from the finish. The final four hills – Taaienberg, Kruisberg-Hotond, Oude Kwaremont and Paterberg are identical to the men's finale. The top of the Paterberg, the last climb of the day, comes at 13.3 km from the finish, ensued by a flat run-in towards Oudenaarde.

== Teams ==
24 teams with six riders each started, totalling 142 participants.

UCI Professional teams

- Boels–Dolmans
- Mitchelton–Scott
- CCC - Liv
- Trek–Segafredo
- Team Sunweb
- Canyon//SRAM
- WNT–Rotor Pro Cycling
- Team Virtu Cycling
- Valcar–Cylance
- Movistar Team
- Tibco–Silicon Valley Bank
- Parkhotel Valkenburg
- Alé–Cipollini
- FDJ Nouvelle-Aquitaine Futuroscope
- Bigla Pro Cycling
- BTC City Ljubljana
- Astana
- Lotto–Soudal Ladies
- Doltcini–Van Eyck Sport
- Aromitalia–Basso Bikes–Vaiano
- Health Mate–Cyclelive Team
- Servetto–Piumate–Beltrami TSA
- Bepink
- Hitec Products–Birk Sport

== Results ==
Final general classification

Rank	Rider	Team	Time
1	Marta Bastianelli (ITA)	Team Virtu Cycling	4h 16' 50"
2	Annemiek van Vleuten (NED)	Mitchelton–Scott	s.t.
3	Cecilie Uttrup Ludwig (DEN)	Bigla Pro Cycling	s.t.
4	Sofia Bertizzolo (ITA)	Team Virtu Cycling	+ 7"
5	Ellen van Dijk (NED)	Trek–Segafredo	s.t.
6	Katarzyna Niewiadoma (POL)	Canyon//SRAM	s.t.
7	Chantal Blaak (NED)	Boels–Dolmans	+ 10"
8	Lisa Brennauer (GER)	WNT–Rotor Pro Cycling	+ 55"
9	Lucinda Brand (NED)	Team Sunweb	s.t.
10	Amy Pieters (NED)	Boels–Dolmans	s.t.

== See also ==
- 2019 in women's road cycling
