= 2017 Ronde van Drenthe (women's race) =

2017 UCI Women's World Tour, race 2 of 20

Race details
- Dates: 11 March 2017
- Stages: 1
- Distance: 152.2 km (94.6 mi)
- Winning time: 3h 51' 17"

Results
	Winner	Amalie Dideriksen (DEN)	(Boels–Dolmans)
	Second	Elena Cecchini (ITA)	(Canyon//SRAM)
	Third	Lucinda Brand (NED)	(Team Sunweb)

UCI Report

The 2017 Ronde van Drenthe was the 11th running of the women's Ronde van Drenthe, a women's bicycle race in the Netherlands. It was the second race of the 2017 UCI Women's World Tour and was held on 11 March 2017 over a distance of 152.2 kilometres (94.6 miles), starting and finishing in Hoogeveen.

The race was won by reigning world champion, Amalie Dideriksen, who won her first race in the rainbow jersey.

== Results ==
Result
Rank	Rider	Team	Time
1	Amalie Dideriksen (DEN)	Boels–Dolmans	3h 51' 17"
2	Elena Cecchini (ITA)	Canyon//SRAM	+ 0"
3	Lucinda Brand (NED)	Team Sunweb	+ 0"
4	Elisa Longo Borghini (ITA)	Wiggle High5	+ 2"
5	Annemiek van Vleuten (NED)	Orica–Scott	+ 7"
6	Jolien D'Hoore (BEL)	Wiggle High5	+ 9"
7	Marianne Vos (NED)	WM3 Energie	+ 9"
8	Alice Barnes (GBR)	Drops	+ 9"
9	Chantal Blaak (NED)	Boels–Dolmans	+ 9"
10	Chloe Hosking (AUS)	Alé–Cipollini	+ 9"
