= 2014 Drentse 8 van Dwingeloo =

Race details
- Dates: 13 March 2014
- Distance: 141.2 km (87.74 mi)
- Winning time: 4h 05' 49"

Results
	Winner	Chantal Blaak (NED)	(Specialized–lululemon)
	Second	Lucy Garner (GBR)	(Team Giant–Shimano)
	Third	Lizzie Armitstead (GBR)	(Boels–Dolmans)

The 2014 Drentse 8 van Dwingeloo was the 8th running of the women's Drentse 8 van Dwingeloo, a women's bicycle race in the Netherlands. It was held on 13 March 2014 over a distance of 141.2 kilometres (87.7 miles), starting and finishing in Dwingeloo. It was rated by the UCI as a 1.2 category race.

== Results ==
	Cyclist	Team	Time
1	Chantal Blaak (NED)	Specialized–lululemon	4h 05' 49"
2	Lucy Garner (GBR)	Team Giant–Shimano	+ 8"
3	Lizzie Armitstead (GBR)	Boels–Dolmans	+ 8"
4	Barbara Guarischi (ITA)	Alé–Cipollini	+ 8"
5	Emma Johansson (SWE)	Orica–AIS	+ 8"
6	Amy Pieters (NED)	Team Giant–Shimano	+ 8"
7	Trixi Worrack (GER)	Specialized–lululemon	+ 8"
8	Emilia Fahlin (SWE)	Wiggle–Honda	+ 8"
9	Chloe Hosking (AUS)	Hitec Products UCK	+ 8"
10	Maria Confalonieri (ITA)	Estado de México–Faren Kuota	+ 8"
