= 2016 Holland Ladies Tour =

2016 Boels Rental Ladies Tour
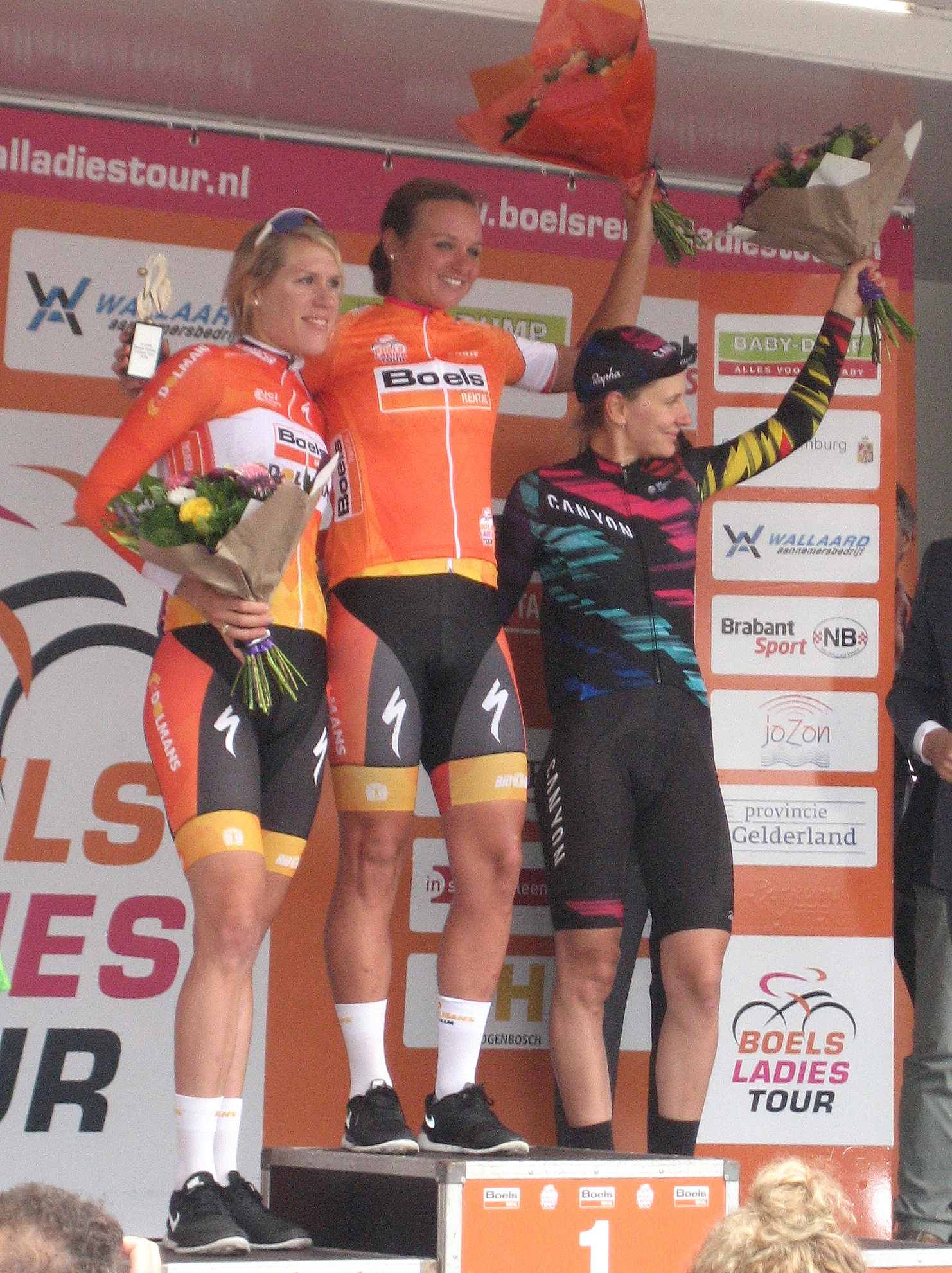

Race details
- Dates: 30 August – 4 September 2016
- Stages: 6
- Distance: 598 km (372 mi)
- Winning time: 15h 35' 01"

Results
Jersey awarded to the overall winner	Winner	Chantal Blaak (NED)	(Boels–Dolmans)
	Second	Ellen van Dijk (NED)	(Boels–Dolmans)
	Third	Alena Amialiusik (BLR)	(Canyon//SRAM)
Jersey awarded to the points classification winner	Points	Katarzyna Niewiadoma (POL)	(Rabobank-Liv Woman Cycling Team)
Jersey awarded to the mountains classification winner	Mountains	Roxane Knetemann (NED)	(Rabobank-Liv Woman Cycling Team)
Jersey awarded to the youth classification winner	Youth	Katarzyna Niewiadoma (POL)	(Rabobank-Liv Woman Cycling Team)
Jersey awarded to the sprints classification winner	Sprints	Winanda Spoor (NED)	(Lensworld–Zannata)
	Team	Boels–Dolmans	

The 2016 Boels Rental Ladies Tour also known as the 2016 Holland Ladies Tour is the 19th edition of the Holland Ladies Tour, a women's cycle stage race held in the Netherlands. The tour is part of the 2016 women's road cycling calendar and is held from 30 August to 4 September. The tour has six stages, including a team time trial. The tour starts in Tiel and concludes with a stage in Valkenburg. The tour has an UCI rating of 2.1.

== Stages ==
=== Stage 1 ===
30 August – Tiel to Tiel, 103.1 km (64.1 mi)

Stage 1 result
Rank	Rider	Team	Time
1	Amalie Dideriksen (DEN)	Boels–Dolmans	2:36:25
2	Sara Mustonen (SWE)	Team Liv–Plantur	+ 0"
3	Barbara Guarischi (ITA)	Canyon//SRAM	+ 0"
4	Loren Rowney (AUS)	Orica–AIS	+ 0"
5	Ellen van Dijk (NED)	Boels–Dolmans	+ 0"
6	Emilie Moberg (NOR)	Team Hitec Products	+ 0"
7	Chantal Blaak (NED)	Boels–Dolmans	+ 2"
8	Maria Giulia Confalonieri (ITA)	Lares–Waowdeals	+ 2"
9	Leah Kirchmann (CAN)	Team Liv–Plantur	+ 2"
10	Nina Kessler (NED)	Lares–Waowdeals	+ 2"

General classification after stage 1
Rank	Rider	Team	Time
1	Amalie Dideriksen (DEN)	Boels–Dolmans	2:36:25
2	Sara Mustonen (SWE)	Team Liv–Plantur	+ 4"
3	Barbara Guarischi (ITA)	Canyon//SRAM	+ 6"
4	Loren Rowney (AUS)	Orica–AIS	+ 10"
5	Ellen van Dijk (NED)	Boels–Dolmans	+ 10"
6	Emilie Moberg (NOR)	Team Hitec Products	+ 10"
7	Chantal Blaak (NED)	Boels–Dolmans	+ 10"
8	Maria Giulia Confalonieri (ITA)	Lares–Waowdeals	+ 11"
9	Leah Kirchmann (CAN)	Team Liv–Plantur	+ 12"
10	Nina Kessler (NED)	Lares–Waowdeals	+ 12"

=== Stage 2 ===
31 August – Gennep to Gennep (Team time trial), 26.4 km (16.4 mi)

Stage 2 result

Rank	Team	Time
1	Boels–Dolmans; Amalie Dideriksen (DEN); Ellen van Dijk (NED); Elizabeth Armitstead (GBR); Chantal Blaak (NED); Karol-Ann Canuel (CAN); Christine Majerus (NED)	30'58"
2	Canyon//SRAM	+ 33"
3	Rabobank-Liv Woman Cycling Team	+ 1'05"
4	Wiggle High5	+ 1'16"
5	Parkhotel Valkenburg Continental Team	+ 1'24"
6	Orica–AIS	+ 1'45"
7	Team Liv–Plantur	+ 1'46"
8	Team Hitec Products	+ 2'26"
9	Lares–Waowdeals	+ 2'59"
10	Lotto–Soudal Ladies	+ 3'11"

General classification after stage 2
Rank	Rider	Team	Time
1	Amalie Dideriksen (DEN)	Boels–Dolmans	3:07:33
2	Ellen van Dijk (NED)	Boels–Dolmans	+ 10"
3	Chantal Blaak (NED)	Boels–Dolmans	+ 10"
4	Karol-Ann Canuel (CAN)	Boels–Dolmans	+ 18"
5	Elizabeth Armitstead (GBR)	Boels–Dolmans	+ 18"
6	Christine Majerus (LUX)	Boels–Dolmans	+ 18"
7	Lisa Brennauer (GER)	Canyon//SRAM	+ 45"
8	Trixi Worrack (GER)	Canyon//SRAM	+ 45"
9	Alena Amialiusik (BLR)	Canyon//SRAM	+ 51"
10	Elena Cecchini (ITA)	Canyon//SRAM	+ 51"

=== Stage 3 ===
1 September – Sittard-Geleen to Sittard-Geleen, 122.6 km (76.2 mi)

Stage 3 result
Rank	Rider	Team	Time
1	Katarzyna Niewiadoma (POL)	Rabobank-Liv Woman Cycling Team	3:20:21
2	Amy Pieters (NED)	Wiggle High5	+ 0"
3	Chantal Blaak (NED)	Boels–Dolmans	+ 0"
4	Alena Amialiusik (BLR)	Canyon//SRAM	+ 0"
5	Leah Kirchmann (CAN)	Team Liv–Plantur	+ 0"
6	Ellen van Dijk (NED)	Boels–Dolmans	+ 8"
7	Lisa Brennauer (GER)	Canyon//SRAM	+ 9"
8	Alice Maria Arzuffi (ITA)	Lensworld–Zannata	+ 14"
9	Hanna Solovey (UKR)	Parkhotel Valkenburg Continental Team	+ 16"
10	Audrey Cordon (FRA)	Wiggle High5	+ 16"

General classification after stage 3
Rank	Rider	Team	Time
1	Chantal Blaak (NED)	Boels–Dolmans	6:27:48
2	Ellen van Dijk (NED)	Boels–Dolmans	+ 11"
3	Karol-Ann Canuel (CAN)	Boels–Dolmans	+ 33"
4	Alena Amialiusik (BLR)	Canyon//SRAM	+ 47"
5	Lisa Brennauer (GER)	Canyon//SRAM	+ 50"
6	Katarzyna Niewiadoma (POL)	Rabobank-Liv Woman Cycling Team	+ 1'07"
7	Amy Pieters (NED)	Wiggle High5	+ 1'17"
8	Anna van der Breggen (NED)	Rabobank-Liv Woman Cycling Team	+ 1'32"
9	Audrey Cordon (FRA)	Wiggle High5	+ 1'46"
10	Leah Kirchmann (CAN)	Team Liv–Plantur	+ 1'54

=== Stage 4 ===
2 September – 's-Hertogenbosch to 's-Hertogenbosch 110.8 km (68.8 mi)

Stage 4 result
Rank	Rider	Team	Time
1	Sarah Roy (AUS)	Orica–AIS	2:45:38
2	Evy Kuijpers (NED)	GRC Jan van Arckel	+ 0"
3	Susanne Andersen (NOR)	Norway national team	+ 0"
4	Nina Kessler (NED)	Lensworld–Zannata	+ 0"
5	Riejanne Markus (NED)	Team Liv–Plantur	+ 0"
6	Barbara Guarischi (ITA)	Canyon//SRAM	+ 0"
7	Jeanne Korevaar (NED)	Rabobank-Liv Woman Cycling Team	+ 0"
8	Emma Johansson (SWE)	Wiggle High5	+ 0"
9	Emilie Moberg (NOR)	Team Hitec Products	+ 0"
10	Simona Frapporti (ITA)	Team Hitec Products	+ 0"

General classification after stage 4
Rank	Rider	Team	Time
1	Chantal Blaak (NED)	Boels–Dolmans	9:18:05
2	Ellen van Dijk (NED)	Boels–Dolmans	+ 11"
3	Karol-Ann Canuel (CAN)	Boels–Dolmans	+ 33"
4	Alena Amialiusik (BLR)	Canyon//SRAM	+ 47"
5	Lisa Brennauer (GER)	Canyon//SRAM	+ 50"
6	Katarzyna Niewiadoma (POL)	Rabobank-Liv Woman Cycling Team	+ 1'07"
7	Christine Majerus (LUX)	Boels–Dolmans	+ 1'14
8	Amy Pieters (NED)	Wiggle High5	+ 1'17"
9	Anna van der Breggen (NED)	Rabobank-Liv Woman Cycling Team	+ 1'32"
10	Audrey Cordon (FRA)	Wiggle High5	+ 1'46"

=== Stage 5 ===
3 September – Tiel to Tiel, 115.7 km (71.9 mi)

Stage 5 result
Rank	Rider	Team	Time
1	Lisa Brennauer (GER)	Canyon//SRAM	2:52:30
2	Loren Rowney (AUS)	Orica–AIS	+ 0"
3	Jolien d'Hoore (BEL)	Wiggle High5	+ 0"
4	Nina Kessler (NED)	Lensworld–Zannata	+ 0"
5	Maria Giulia Confalonieri (ITA)	Lensworld–Zannata	+ 0"
6	Anouk Rijff (NED)	Lotto–Soudal Ladies	+ 0"
7	Susanne Andersen (NOR)	Norway national team	+ 0"
8	Kaat Hannes (BEL)	Lensworld–Zannata	+ 0"
9	Sara Mustonen (SWE)	Team Liv–Plantur	+ 0"
10	Chantal Blaak (NED)	Boels–Dolmans	+ 0"

General classification after stage 5
Rank	Rider	Team	Time
1	Chantal Blaak (NED)	Boels–Dolmans	12:10:35
2	Ellen van Dijk (NED)	Boels–Dolmans	+ 11"
3	Karol-Ann Canuel (CAN)	Boels–Dolmans	+ 33"
4	Lisa Brennauer (GER)	Canyon//SRAM	+ 40"
5	Alena Amialiusik (BLR)	Canyon//SRAM	+ 47"
6	Katarzyna Niewiadoma (POL)	Rabobank-Liv Woman Cycling Team	+ 1'07"
7	Christine Majerus (LUX)	Boels–Dolmans	+ 1'14
8	Amy Pieters (NED)	Wiggle High5	+ 1'17"
9	Anna van der Breggen (NED)	Rabobank-Liv Woman Cycling Team	+ 1'32"
10	Audrey Cordon (FRA)	Wiggle High5	+ 1'46"

=== Stage 6 ===
4 September – Bunde to Valkenburg, 119.4 km (74.2 mi)

Stage 6 result
Rank	Rider	Team	Time
1	Katarzyna Niewiadoma (POL)	Rabobank-Liv Woman Cycling Team	3:24:21
2	Ellen van Dijk (NED)	Boels–Dolmans	+ 3"
3	Alena Amialiusik (BLR)	Canyon//SRAM	+ 3"
4	Anna van der Breggen (NED)	Rabobank-Liv Woman Cycling Team	+ 5"
5	Amy Pieters (NED)	Wiggle High5	+ 5"
6	Chantal Blaak (NED)	Boels–Dolmans	+ 5"
7	Emma Johansson (SWE)	Wiggle High5	+ 21"
8	Amanda Spratt (AUS)	Orica–AIS	+ 21"
9	Hanna Solovey (UKR)	Parkhotel Valkenburg Continental Team	+ 21"
10	Karol-Ann Canuel (CAN)	Boels–Dolmans	+ 21"

General classification after stage 6
Rank	Rider	Team	Time
1	Chantal Blaak (NED)	Boels–Dolmans	15:35:01
2	Ellen van Dijk (NED)	Boels–Dolmans	+ 3"
3	Alena Amialiusik (BLR)	Canyon//SRAM	+ 41"
4	Karol-Ann Canuel (CAN)	Boels–Dolmans	+ 49"
5	Katarzyna Niewiadoma (POL)	Rabobank-Liv Woman Cycling Team	+ 52"
6	Amy Pieters (NED)	Wiggle High5	+ 1'17"
7	Anna van der Breggen (NED)	Rabobank-Liv Woman Cycling Team	+ 1'32"
8	Lisa Brennauer (GER)	Canyon//SRAM	+ 1'38"
9	Hanna Solovey (UKR)	Parkhotel Valkenburg Continental Team	+ 2'18
10	Leah Kirchmann (CAN)	Team Liv–Plantur	+ 2'23"

== Classification leadership ==
Stage	Winner	General classification	Points classification	Mountain classification	Sprint classification	Young rider classification	Combined classification	Combativity classification	Team classification
1	Amalie Dideriksen	Amalie Dideriksen	Amalie Dideriksen	Minke van Dongen	Winanda Spoor	Amalie Dideriksen	Amalie Dideriksen	Katarzyna Niewiadoma	Boels–Dolmans
2	Boels–Dolmans	Amalie Dideriksen	Amalie Dideriksen	Minke van Dongen	Winanda Spoor	Amalie Dideriksen	Amalie Dideriksen	Katarzyna Niewiadoma	Boels–Dolmans
3	Katarzyna Niewiadoma	Chantal Blaak	Katarzyna Niewiadoma	Ellen van Dijk	Winanda Spoor	Katarzyna Niewiadoma	Chantal Blaak	Roxane Knetemann	Boels–Dolmans
4	Sarah Roy	Chantal Blaak	Sarah Roy	Roxane Knetemann	Nathalie van Gogh	Katarzyna Niewiadoma	Chantal Blaak	Roxane Knetemann	Boels–Dolmans
5	Lisa Brennauer	Chantal Blaak	Lisa Brennauer	Roxane Knetemann	Winanda Spoor	Katarzyna Niewiadoma	Chantal Blaak	Chantal Hoffmann	Boels–Dolmans
6	Katarzyna Niewiadoma	Chantal Blaak	Katarzyna Niewiadoma	Roxane Knetemann	Winanda Spoor	Katarzyna Niewiadoma	Chantal Blaak	Roxane Knetemann	Boels–Dolmans
Final Classification		Chantal Blaak	Katarzyna Niewiadoma	Roxane Knetemann	Winanda Spoor	Katarzyna Niewiadoma	Chantal Blaak	Roxane Knetemann	Boels–Dolmans

== See also ==
- 2016 in women's road cycling
