= Cycling at the 2019 European Games – Women's road time trial =

Women's road time trial at the 2019 European Games
- Venue: Minsk (28.6 km)
- Date: 25 June
- Competitors: 29 from 19 nations
- Winning time: 36:17.41

Medalists
gold medal	Marlen Reusser	Switzerland
silver medal	Chantal Blaak	Netherlands
bronze medal	Hayley Simmonds	Great Britain

The women's road time trial cycling event at the 2019 European Games in Minsk took place over a distance of 28.6 km on 25 June.

== Results ==
Rank	Bib	Start order	Rider	Nation	Time	Behind
1st place, gold medalist(s)	24	6	Marlen Reusser	Switzerland	36:17.41	
2nd place, silver medalist(s)	1	29	Chantal Blaak	Netherlands	37:32.44	+1:15.03
3rd place, bronze medalist(s)	17	13	Hayley Simmonds	Great Britain	37:44.57	+1:27.16
4	6	24	Alice Barnes	Great Britain	37:45.38	+1:27.97
5	21	9	Alena Amialiusik	Belarus	37:46.18	+1:28.77
6	8	22	Eugenia Bujak	Slovenia	38:22.54	+2:05.13
7	22	8	Tetyana Ryabchenko	Ukraine	38:29.04	+2:11.63
8	3	27	Clara Koppenburg	Germany	38:36.93	+2:19.52
9	25	5	Rotem Gafinovitz	Israel	38:42.58	+2:25.17
10	10	20	Tatsiana Sharakova	Belarus	38:45.23	+2:27.82
11	12	18	Valeriya Kononenko	Ukraine	38:45.98	+2:28.57
12	2	28	Letizia Paternoster	Italy	38:49.67	+2:32.26
13	7	23	Maria Novolodskaya	Russia	39:10.73	+2:53.32
14	18	12	Yelyzaveta Oshurkova	Russia	39:47.59	+3:30.18
15	4	26	Małgorzata Jasińska	Poland	39:49.63	+3:32.22
16	14	16	Christa Riffel	Germany	39:49.99	+3:32.58
17	26	4	Antri Christoforou	Cyprus	40:08.92	+3:51.51
18	19	11	Urša Pintar	Slovenia	40:29.14	+4:11.73
19	15	15	Katarzyna Wilkos	Poland	40:29.41	+4:12.00
20	27	3	Mia Radotić	Croatia	40:39.58	+4:22.17
21	16	14	Maëlle Grossetête	France	40:51.10	+4:33.69
22	5	25	Roxane Fournier	France	40:56.59	+4:39.18
23	13	17	Nikola Nosková	Czech Republic	41:02.35	+4:44.94
24	23	7	Jarmila Machačová	Czech Republic	41:08.58	+4:51.17
25	9	21	Christine Majerus	Luxembourg	41:20.95	+5:03.54
26	11	19	Silvija Pacevičienė	Lithuania	41:42.85	+5:25.44
27	20	10	Claire Faber	Luxembourg	41:56.70	+5:39.29
28	28	2	Alžbeta Bačíková	Slovakia	43:06.96	+6:49.55
29	29	1	Keziban Koyun	Turkey	44:52.66	+8:35.25
