= 2021 Strade Bianche Women =

Cycling race

2021 UCI Women's World Tour, race 1 of 18
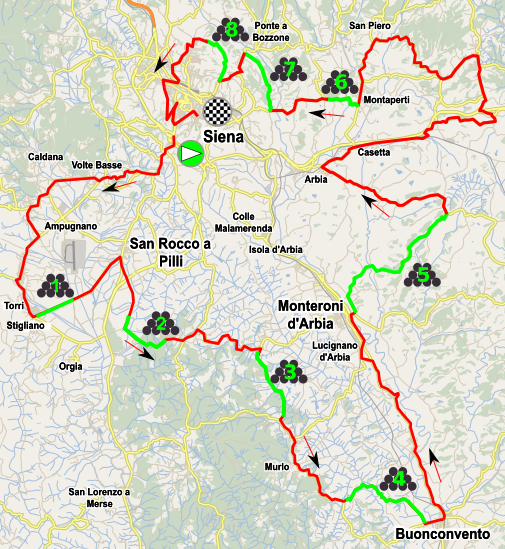

Race details
- Dates: 6 March 2021
- Stages: 1
- Distance: 136 km (85 mi)
- Winning time: 3h 54' 40"

Results
	Winner	Chantal van den Broek-Blaak (NED)	(SD Worx)
	Second	Elisa Longo Borghini (ITA)	(Trek–Segafredo)
	Third	Anna van der Breggen (NED)	(SD Worx)

The seventh edition of the Strade Bianche Donne took place on 6 March 2021. The Italian race is the first event of the 2021 UCI Women's World Tour as the usual first race of season in Australia, the Cadel Evans Great Ocean Road Race, was cancelled due to the COVID-19 pandemic. It was won by Chantal van den Broek-Blaak.

== Route ==
The race started and finished in Siena, Italy. The route is identical to that of the previous years, containing 30 km (19 mi) of gravel roads spread over eight sectors, for a total distance of 136 km (85 mi).

Sectors of strade bianche donne
No.	Name	Distance from		Length (km)	Category	Description
No.	Name	Start (km)	Finish (km)	Length (km)	Category	Description
1	Vidritta	17.6	118.4	2.1	*	Perfectly straight and slightly downhill
2	Bagnaia	25	111.0	5.8	*	Short descent followed by a long climb with sections of over 10% gradient
3	Radi	36.9	99.1	4.4	*	A classic gravel section
4	La piana	47.6	88.4	5.5	*	No significant gradient
5	San Martino in Grania	67.5	68.5	9.5	*	A long sector with continuous ups and downs to start with, and ends with a twisting climb
6	Monteaperti	111.3	24.7	0.8	*	Short, but features a double-digit gradient ramp
7	Colle Pinzuto	116.6	19.4	2.4	*	The climb toward Colle Pinzuto, with gradients of up to 15%
8	Le Tolfe	123.6	12.4	1.1	*	A sequence of demanding descents followed by a very punchy climb with a maximum gradient of 18%

== Teams ==
Nine UCI Women's WorldTeams and fourteen UCI Women's Continental Teams made up the twenty-three teams that competed in the race. Only three teams did not enter the maximum squad of six riders; these teams were Born to Win G20 Ambedo, Isolmant–Premac–Vittoria, and Servetto–Makhymo–Beltrami TSA, and they each entered five riders. From the 135 riders who started the race, 85 finished.

UCI Women's WorldTeams

- Alé BTC Ljubljana
- Canyon//SRAM
- FDJ Nouvelle-Aquitaine Futuroscope
- Liv Racing
- Movistar Team
- SD Worx
- Team BikeExchange
- Team DSM
- Trek–Segafredo

UCI Women's Continental Teams

- A.R. Monex
- Aromitalia–Basso Bikes–Vaiano
- Bepink
- Born to Win G20 Ambedo
- Ceratizit–WNT Pro Cycling
- Isolmant–Premac–Vittoria
- Lotto–Soudal Ladies
- Massi–Tactic
- Parkhotel Valkenburg
- Servetto–Makhymo–Beltrami TSA
- Team Jumbo–Visma
- Tibco–Silicon Valley Bank
- Top Girls Fassa Bortolo
- Valcar–Travel & Service

== Result ==
Result
Rank	Rider	Team	Time
1	Chantal van den Broek-Blaak (NED)	SD Worx	3h 54' 40"
2	Elisa Longo Borghini (ITA)	Trek–Segafredo	+ 7"
3	Anna van der Breggen (NED)	SD Worx	+ 9"
4	Annemiek van Vleuten (NED)	Movistar Team	+ 11"
5	Cecilie Uttrup Ludwig (DEN)	FDJ Nouvelle-Aquitaine Futuroscope	+ 11"
6	Demi Vollering (NED)	SD Worx	+ 11"
7	Marianne Vos (NED)	Team Jumbo–Visma	+ 23"
8	Marta Cavalli (ITA)	FDJ Nouvelle-Aquitaine Futuroscope	+ 27"
9	Katarzyna Niewiadoma (POL)	Canyon//SRAM	+ 30"
10	Ellen van Dijk (NED)	Trek–Segafredo	+ 32"
