= 2010 Open de Suède Vårgårda =

2010 UCI Women's Road World Cup, race 8 of 9

Race details
- Dates: 1 August 2010
- Stages: 1
- Distance: 132 km (82 mi)
- Winning time: 3h 23' 33"

Results
	Winner	Kirsten Wild (NED)	(Cervélo TestTeam)
	Second	Adrie Visser (NED)	(Team HTC–Columbia Women)
	Third	Emma Johansson (SWE)	(Red Sun Cycling Team)

The 2010 Open de Suède Vårgårda was the 5th road race running on the Open de Suède Vårgårda. It was held on 1 August 2010 over a distance of 132 kilometres (82.0 miles) and was the eight race of the 2010 UCI Women's Road World Cup season.

== General standings (top 10) ==
	Cyclists	Team	Time	World Cup points
1	Kirsten Wild (NED)	Cervélo TestTeam	3h 23' 33"	100
2	Adrie Visser (NED)	Team HTC–Columbia Women	s.t.	70
3	Emma Johansson (SWE)	Red Sun Cycling Team	s.t.	40
4	Annemiek van Vleuten (NED)	Nederland bloeit	s.t.	30
5	Ellen van Dijk (NED)	Team HTC–Columbia Women	s.t.	25
6	Grace Verbeke (BEL)	Lotto Ladies Team	+ 4"	20
7	Chantal Blaak (NED)	leontien.nl	+ 4"	15
8	Charlotte Becker (GER)	Cervélo TestTeam	+ 4"	10
9	Irene van den Broek (NED)	leontien.nl	+ 4"	9
10	Megan Dunn (AUS)	Australia	+ 4"	8

Results from uci.ch.
