= 2022 Tour of Flanders (women's race) =

Cycling race

2023 Ronde van Vlaanderen Elite Vrouwen
2022 UCI Women's World Tour, race 6 of 23
- Event poster with previous winners Kasper Asgreen and Annemiek van Vleuten

Race details
- Dates: 3 April 2022
- Stages: 1
- Distance: 159 km (99 mi)
- Winning time: 4h 11' 21"

Results
	Winner	Lotte Kopecky (BEL)	(SD Worx)
	Second	Annemiek van Vleuten (NED)	(Movistar Team)
	Third	Chantal van den Broek-Blaak (NED)	(SD Worx)

The 2022 Ronde van Vlaanderen was a Belgian road cycling one-day race that took place on 3 April 2022. It was the 19th edition of Tour of Flanders for Women and the 6th event of the 2022 UCI Women's World Tour.

It was won in the sprint by the Belgian champion Lotte Kopecky ahead of Annemiek van Vleuten and Chantal van den Broek-Blaak.

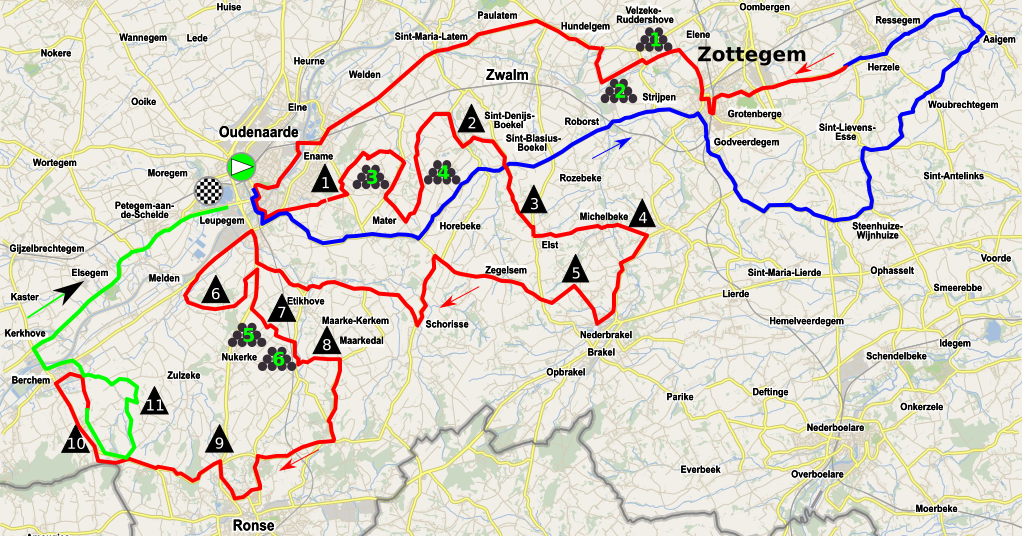
Map of the Ronde van Vlaanderen 2022 women, with the final in green.

== Results ==
Result
Rank	Rider	Team	Time
1	Lotte Kopecky (BEL)	SD Worx	4h 11' 21"
2	Annemiek van Vleuten (NED)	Movistar Team	+ 0"
3	Chantal van den Broek-Blaak (NED)	SD Worx	+ 2"
4	Arlenis Sierra (CUB)	Movistar Team	+ 40"
5	Marlen Reusser (SUI)	SD Worx	+ 40"
6	Cecilie Uttrup Ludwig (DEN)	FDJ Nouvelle-Aquitaine Futuroscope	+ 40"
7	Grace Brown (AUS)	FDJ Nouvelle-Aquitaine Futuroscope	+ 40"
8	Katarzyna Niewiadoma (POL)	Canyon//SRAM	+ 40"
9	Brodie Chapman (AUS)	FDJ Nouvelle-Aquitaine Futuroscope	+ 42"
10	Marta Bastianelli (ITA)	UAE Team Emirates	+ 1' 10"

== See also ==
- 2022 in women's road cycling
