= 2020 Omloop Het Nieuwsblad (women's race) =

Race details
- Dates: 29 February 2020
- Stages: 1
- Distance: 122.9 km (76.4 mi)
- Winning time: 3h 34' 55"

Results
	Winner	Annemiek van Vleuten (NED)	(Mitchelton–Scott)
	Second	Marta Bastianelli (ITA)	(Alé BTC Ljubljana)
	Third	Floortje Mackaij (NED)	(Team Sunweb)

The 2019 Omloop Het Nieuwsblad was the 15th edition of the women's Omloop Het Nieuwsblad road cycling one-day race which was held on 29 February. The race was a 1.1 event of the women's international calendar. The race started in Ghent and finished in Ninove. The total distance was 122.9 km (76.4 mi), covering ten classified climbs in the Flemish Ardennes.

== Teams ==
Twenty-four teams participated in the race. Each team had a maximum of six riders:

UCI Women's WorldTeams

- Alé BTC Ljubljana
- Canyon//SRAM
- CCC - Liv
- FDJ Nouvelle-Aquitaine Futuroscope
- Mitchelton–Scott
- Movistar Team
- Team Sunweb
- Trek–Segafredo

UCI Women's Continental Teams

- Boels–Dolmans
- Chevalmeire Cycling Team
- Lotto–Soudal Ladies
- Multum Accountants–LSK Ladies
- Ciclotel
- Biehler Krush Pro Cycling
- Rally Cycling
- Drops
- Hitec Products–Birk Sport
- NXTG Racing
- Parkhotel Valkenburg
- Tibco–Silicon Valley Bank
- Valcar–Travel & Service
- WCC Team
- Bigla–Katusha
- Doltcini–Van Eyck Sport

== Results ==
Final general classification
Rank	Rider	Team	Time
1	Annemiek van Vleuten (NED)	Mitchelton–Scott	3h 34' 55"
2	Marta Bastianelli (ITA)	Alé BTC Ljubljana	+ 42"
3	Floortje Mackaij (NED)	Team Sunweb	+ 42"
4	Chantal van den Broek-Blaak (NED)	Boels–Dolmans	+ 42"
5	Ellen van Dijk (NED)	Trek–Segafredo	+ 44"
6	Lizzy Banks (UK)	Bigla–Katusha	+ 1' 13"
7	Eugenia Bujak (SLO)	Alé BTC Ljubljana	+ 1' 13"
8	Chloe Hosking (AUS)	Rally Cycling	+ 1' 30"
9	Jip van den Bos (NED)	Boels–Dolmans	+ 1' 30"
10	Aude Biannic (FRA)	Movistar Team	+ 1' 30"

== See also ==
- 2020 in women's road cycling
