= 2016 Ronde van Drenthe =

2016 UCI Women's World Tour, race 2 of 17
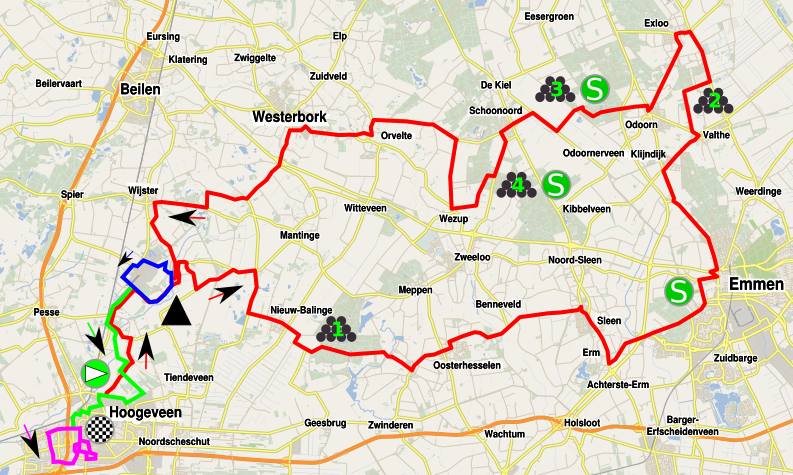

Race details
- Dates: 12 March 2016
- Stages: 1
- Distance: 138.3 km (85.9 mi)
- Winning time: 3h 36' 13"

Results
	Winner	Chantal Blaak (NED)	(Boels–Dolmans)
	Second	Gracie Elvin (AUS)	(Orica–AIS)
	Third	Trixi Worrack (GER)	(Canyon//SRAM)

The 2016 Ronde van Drenthe was the 10th running of the women's Ronde van Drenthe, a women's bicycle race in the Netherlands. It was the second World Tour race of the 2016 UCI Women's World Tour and was held on 12 March 2016 over a distance of 138.3 kilometres (85.9 miles), starting and finishing in Hoogeveen.

== Results ==
Result
Rank	Rider	Team	Time
1	Chantal Blaak (NED)	Boels–Dolmans	3h 36' 13"
2	Gracie Elvin (AUS)	Orica–AIS	s.t.
3	Trixi Worrack (GER)	Canyon//SRAM	s.t.
4	Anna van der Breggen (NED)	Rabobank-Liv Woman Cycling Team	s.t.
5	Marta Bastianelli (ITA)	Alé–Cipollini	+ 1' 49"
6	Shelley Olds (USA)	Cylance Pro Cycling	+ 1' 49"
7	Floortje Mackaij (NED)	Team Liv–Plantur	+ 1' 49"
8	Lauren Kitchen (AUS)	Team Hitec Products	+ 1' 49"
9	Annemiek van Vleuten (NED)	Orica–AIS	+ 1' 49"
10	Leah Kirchmann (CAN)	Team Liv–Plantur	+ 1' 49"
