= 2017 Trofeo Alfredo Binda-Comune di Cittiglio =

2017 UCI Women's World Tour, race 3 of 20
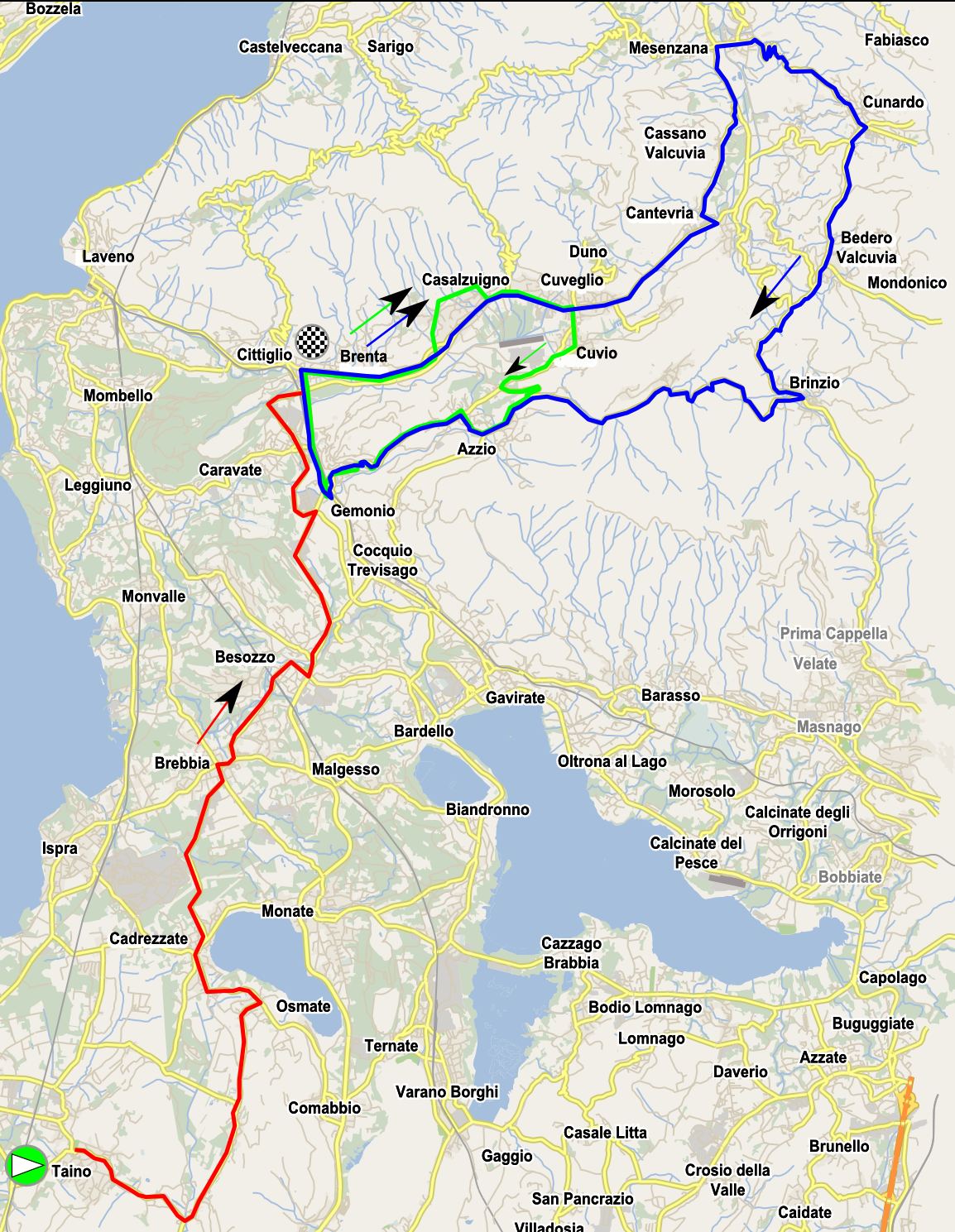

Race details
- Dates: 19 March 2017
- Stages: 1
- Distance: 131.3 km (81.6 mi)
- Winning time: 3h 25' 26"

Results
	Winner	Coryn Rivera (USA)	(Team Sunweb)
	Second	Arlenis Sierra (CUB)	(Astana)
	Third	Cecilie Uttrup Ludwig (DEN)	(Cervélo–Bigla Pro Cycling)

UCI Report

The 2017 Trofeo Alfredo Binda-Comune di Cittiglio was the 42nd running of the women's Trofeo Alfredo Binda-Comune di Cittiglio, a women's bicycle race in Italy. It was the third race of the 2017 UCI Women's World Tour season and was held on 19 March 2017; the race started in Gavirate and finished in Cittiglio.

In a reduced field sprint finish, Team Sunweb rider Coryn Rivera from the United States achieved her first World Tour race win, out-sprinting Cuban national champion Arlenis Sierra (Astana), while Denmark's Cecilie Uttrup Ludwig completed the podium for the Cervélo–Bigla Pro Cycling team.

== Teams ==
25 teams competed in the race.

UCI Women's Teams

- Alé–Cipollini
- Aromitalia Vaiano
- Astana
- Bepink–Cogeas
- Boels–Dolmans
- BTC City Ljubljana
- Canyon//SRAM
- Cervélo–Bigla Pro Cycling
- Cylance Pro Cycling
- Drops
- FDJ Nouvelle-Aquitaine Futuroscope
- Team Hitec Products
- Lares–Waowdeals
- Lensworld–Kuota
- Orica–Scott
- S.C. Michela Fanini Rox
- Servetto Giusta
- Team Sunweb
- Tibco–Silicon Valley Bank
- Top Girls Fassa Bortolo
- Valcar–PBM
- Wiggle High5
- WM3 Energie

National teams

- Netherlands
- Switzerland

== Results ==
Result
Rank	Rider	Team	Time
1	Coryn Rivera (USA)	Team Sunweb	3h 25' 26"
2	Arlenis Sierra (CUB)	Astana	+ 0"
3	Cecilie Uttrup Ludwig (DEN)	Cervélo–Bigla Pro Cycling	+ 0"
4	Chantal Blaak (NED)	Boels–Dolmans	+ 2"
5	Elena Cecchini (ITA)	Canyon//SRAM	+ 2"
6	Annemiek van Vleuten (NED)	Orica–Scott	+ 2"
7	Eugenia Bujak (POL)	BTC City Ljubljana	+ 2"
8	Katarzyna Niewiadoma (POL)	WM3 Energie	+ 2"
9	Elisa Longo Borghini (ITA)	Wiggle High5	+ 2"
10	Ashleigh Moolman (RSA)	Cervélo–Bigla Pro Cycling	+ 2"

== See also ==
- 2017 in women's road cycling
