= 2014 Ronde van Drenthe =

2014 Novilon EDR Cup
Race details
- Dates: 16 March 2014
- Stages: 1
- Distance: 139.5 km (86.7 mi)
- Winning time: 3h 41' 25"

Results
	Winner	Kirsten Wild (Netherlands)	(Team Giant–Shimano)
	Second	Shelley Olds (United States)	(Alé–Cipollini)
	Third	Emma Johansson (Sweden)	(Orica–AIS)

The 2014 Novilon EDR Cup was a bicycle race in the Netherlands, which formed part of the Dutch one day women's elite race season. It was held on 16 March 2014 over a distance of 139.5 kilometres (86.7 miles). It was rated by the UCI as a 1.2 category race.

== Results ==
	Cyclist	Team	Time
1	Kirsten Wild (NED)	Team Giant–Shimano	3h 41' 25"
2	Shelley Olds (USA)	Alé–Cipollini	s.t.
3	Emma Johansson (SWE)	Orica–AIS	s.t.
4	Jolien D'Hoore (BEL)	Lotto–Belisol Ladies	+ 3"
5	Chantal Blaak (NED)	Specialized–lululemon	+ 3"
6	Janneke Ensing (NED)	Boels–Dolmans	+ 3"
7	Tiffany Cromwell (AUS)	Specialized–lululemon	+ 3"
8	Jo Kiesanowski (NZL)	TIBCO / To The Top	+ 3"
9	Lucinda Brand (NED)	Rabobank-Liv Woman Cycling Team	+ 3"
10	Lisa Brennauer (DEU)	Specialized–lululemon	+ 1' 54"
