= 2011 Holland Ladies Tour =

2011 Profile Ladies Tour
Race details
- Dates: September 6–11
- Stages: 6
- Distance: 605 km (375.9 mi)
- Winning time: 15h 23' 14"

Results
| Jersey awarded to the overall winner | Winner | Marianne Vos (NED) | (Nederland Bloeit) |
| | Second | Emma Johansson (SWE) | (HiTec Products-UCK) |
| | Third | Kirsten Wild (NED) | (AA cycling Team) |

Stage 1 Stage 2 Stage 3 Stage 4 Stage 5 Stage 6

The 14th edition of the annual Holland Ladies Tour was held from September 6 to September 11, 2011. The women's stage race with an UCI rating of 2.2 started in Neerijnen, and finished in Berg en Terblijt.

== Stages ==
=== 2011-09-06: Neerijnen — Ophemert (114.3 km) ===
| Place | Stage 1 | | General Classification | |
| Place | Name | Time | Name | Time |
|---|---|---|---|---|
| 1. | Marianne Vos (NED) | 02:48.11 | Marianne Vos (NED) | 02:48.11 |
| 2. | Ina-Yoko Teutenberg (GER) | s.t. | Ina-Yoko Teutenberg (GER) | s.t. |
| 3. | Kirsten Wild (NED) | s.t. | Kirsten Wild (NED) | s.t. |

=== 2011-09-07: Gemert — Gemert (20.5 km) ===
| Place | Stage 2 (Individual Time Trial) | | General Classification | |
| Place | Name | Time | Name | Time |
|---|---|---|---|---|
| 1. | Ellen van Dijk (NED) | 27.31 | Marianne Vos (NED) | 3:15.38 |
| 2. | Marianne Vos (NED) | +0.11 | | |
| 3. | Annemiek van Vleuten (NED) | +0.26 | | |

=== 2011-09-08: Breda — Breda (115.2 km) ===
| Place | Stage 3 | | General Classification | |
| Place | Name | Time | Name | Time |
|---|---|---|---|---|
| 1. | Loes Gunnewijk (NED) | 02:54.18 | Marianne Vos (NED) | 06:10.12 |
| 2. | Marianne Vos (NED) | +0.27 | | |
| 3. | Emma Johansson (SWE) | +0.27 | | |

=== 2011-09-09: Papendrecht — Papendrecht (127.5 km) ===
| Place | Stage 4 | | General Classification | |
| Place | Name | Time | Name | Time |
|---|---|---|---|---|
| 1. | Maaike Polspoel (BEL) | 03:15.35 | Marianne Vos (NED) | 09:27.23 |
| 2. | Trixi Worrack (GER) | s.t. | | |
| 3. | Linda van Rijen (NED) | +0.28 | | |

=== 2011-09-10: Nuenen — Gerwen (113.7 km) ===
| Place | Stage 5 | | General Classification | |
| Place | Name | Time | Name | Time |
|---|---|---|---|---|
| 1. | Marianne Vos (NED) | 02:50.46 | Marianne Vos (NED) | 12:17.56 |
| 2. | Kirsten Wild (NED) | s.t. | | |
| 3. | Ina-Yoko Teutenberg (GER) | s.t. | | |

=== 2011-09-11: Bunde — Berg en Terblijt (113.8 km) ===
| Place | Stage 6 | | General Classification | |
| Place | Name | Time | Name | Time |
|---|---|---|---|---|
| 1. | Marianne Vos (NED) | 03:05.28 | Marianne Vos (NED) | 12:37.09 |
| 2. | Kirsten Wild (NED) | +0.34 | | |
| 3. | Ina-Yoko Teutenberg (GER) | +0.34 | | |

== Final standings ==
=== General Classification ===
| RANK | NAME | TEAM | TIME |
|---|---|---|---|
| 1. | Marianne Vos (NED) | Nederland Bloeit | 15:23.14 |
| 2. | Emma Johansson (SWE) | Team Hitec Products UCK | + 1.41 |
| 3. | Kirsten Wild (NED) | AA Drink–leontien.nl | + 1.57 |
| 4. | Chloe Hosking (AUS) | Team HTC–Highroad Women | + 5.20 |
| 5. | Chantal Blaak (NED) | AA Drink–leontien.nl | + 5.21 |
| 6. | Joëlle Numainville (CAN) | Team TIBCO – To The Top | + 6.07 |
| 7. | Lucinda Brand (NED) | AA Drink–leontien.nl | + 6.13 |
| 8. | Loes Gunnewijk (NED) | Nederland Bloeit | + 6.32 |
| 9. | Annemiek van Vleuten (NED) | Nederland Bloeit | + 9.18 |
| 10. | Giorgia Bronzini (ITA) | Italian National Team | + 9.55 |
