= 2021 Tour of Flanders (women's race) =

Cycling race

2021 Tour of Flanders for Women
2021 UCI Women's World Tour, race 5 of 18

Race details
- Dates: 4 April 2021
- Stages: 1
- Distance: 152.0 km (94.4 mi)
- Winning time: 4h 01' 11"

Results
	Winner	Annemiek van Vleuten (NED)	(Movistar Team)
	Second	Lisa Brennauer (GER)	(Ceratizit–WNT Pro Cycling)
	Third	Grace Brown (AUS)	(Team BikeExchange)

The 18th running of the Tour of Flanders for Women, a women's cycling race in Belgium, was held on 4 April 2021, serving as the 5th event of the 2021 UCI Women's World Tour. It was won for the second time by Annemiek van Vleuten, whose first win in this race came a decade prior.

== Teams ==
Nine UCI Women's WorldTeams and fifteen UCI Women's Continental Teams competed in the race. Out of 144 riders that started the race, there were 111 finishers.

UCI Women's WorldTeams

- Alé BTC Ljubljana
- Canyon//SRAM
- FDJ Nouvelle-Aquitaine Futuroscope
- Liv Racing
- Movistar Team
- SD Worx
- Team BikeExchange
- Team DSM
- Trek–Segafredo

UCI Women's Continental Teams

- A.R. Monex
- Aromitalia–Basso Bikes–Vaiano
- Bingoal Casino–Chevalmeire
- Ceratizit–WNT Pro Cycling
- Doltcini–Van Eyck–Proximus
- Drops–Le Col
- Lotto–Soudal Ladies
- Massi–Tactic
- Multum Accountants Ladies
- Parkhotel Valkenburg
- Plantur–Pura
- Team Coop–Hitec Products
- Team Jumbo–Visma
- Tibco–Silicon Valley Bank
- Valcar–Travel & Service

== Results ==
Result
Rank	Rider	Team	Time
1	Annemiek van Vleuten (NED)	Movistar Team	4h 01' 11"
2	Lisa Brennauer (GER)	Ceratizit–WNT Pro Cycling	+ 26"
3	Grace Brown (AUS)	Team BikeExchange	+ 26"
4	Elisa Longo Borghini (ITA)	Trek–Segafredo	+ 26"
5	Demi Vollering (NED)	SD Worx	+ 26"
6	Marta Cavalli (ITA)	FDJ Nouvelle-Aquitaine Futuroscope	+ 28"
7	Cecilie Uttrup Ludwig (DEN)	FDJ Nouvelle-Aquitaine Futuroscope	+ 28"
8	Anna van der Breggen (NED)	SD Worx	+ 35"
9	Marlen Reusser (SUI)	Alé BTC Ljubljana	+ 51"
10	Kristen Faulkner (USA)	Tibco–Silicon Valley Bank	+ 55"

== See also ==
- 2021 in women's road cycling
