= 2010 Ronde van Drenthe =

2010 Novilon Eurocup Ronde van Drenthe
Race details
- Dates: 15 April 2010
- Stages: 1
- Distance: 141.2 km (87.74 mi)
- Winning time: 3h 33' 17"

Results
	Winner	Annemiek van Vleuten (the Netherlands)	(Nederland Bloeit)
	Second	Ina-Yoko Teutenberg (Germany)	(Team HTC-Columbia Women)
	Third	Kirsten Wild (the Netherlands)	(Cervélo Test Team)

The 2010 Novilon Eurocup Ronde van Drenthe was the 12th running of the Damesronde van Drenthe, a women's bicycle race in Drenthe, the Netherlands. It was held on 11 April 2010 over a distance of 141.2 kilometres (87.7 miles). It was rated by the UCI as a 1.1 category race.

== Results ==
	Cyclist	Team	Time
1	Annemiek van Vleuten (NED)	Nederland Bloeit	3h 33' 17"
2	Ina-Yoko Teutenberg (GER)	Team HTC-Columbia Women	+ 21"
3	Kirsten Wild (NED)	Cervélo Test Team	+ 21"
4	Marianne Vos (NED)	Nederland Bloeit	+ 21"
5	Emma Johansson (SWE)	Red Sun Cycling Team	+ 21"
6	Sarah Düster (GER)	Cervélo Test Team	+ 31"
7	Charlotte Becker (GER)	Cervélo Test Team	+ 1' 29"
8	Vicki Whitelaw (AUS)	Lotto Ladies Team	+ 1' 29"
9	Anita Valen (BEL)	Lotto Ladies Team	+ 1' 29"
10	Ellen van Dijk (NED)	Team HTC-Columbia Women	+ 1' 29"
