= 2017 UCI Road World Championships – Women's road race =

Cycling race

Women's road race
2017 UCI Road World Championships
- Rainbow jersey

Race details
- Dates: 23 September 2017
- Stages: 1 in Bergen, Norway
- Distance: 152.8 km (94.9 mi)
- Winning time: 4h 06' 30"

Medalists
	Gold	(Netherlands) Chantal Blaak (NED)
	Silver	(Australia) Katrin Garfoot (AUS)
	Bronze	(Denmark) Amalie Dideriksen (DEN)

The Women's road race of the 2017 UCI Road World Championships is a cycling event that took place on 23 September 2017 in Bergen, Norway. It was won by Chantal Blaak of the Netherlands, ahead of Australian Katrin Garfoot and the defending champion, Amalie Dideriksen of Denmark.

== Course ==
The race started and finished on the Festplassen in Bergen, with the riders completing eight laps of a circuit 19.1 kilometres (11.9 miles) in length. The main feature of the circuit was the climb of Salmon Hill, about 7 kilometres (4.3 miles) into the lap; the climb was 1.5 kilometres (0.93 miles) long at an average gradient of 6.4%. At 152.8 kilometres (94.9 miles), the 2017 women's road race was the longest in the championships' history, surpassing the previous record of 140.05 kilometres (87.02 miles) in 2013.

== Qualification ==
Qualification was based mainly on the UCI World Ranking by nations as of 15 August 2017. The first five nations in this classification qualified seven riders to start, the next ten nations qualified six riders to start and the next five nations qualified five riders to start. All other nations had the possibility to send three riders to start. In addition to this number, the outgoing World Champion and the current continental champions were also able to take part.

=== Continental champions ===
Champion	Name	Note
Outgoing World Champion	Amalie Dideriksen (DEN)	Competed
African Champion	Aurelie Halbwachs (MRI)	Competed
Asian Champion	Yang Qianyu (HKG)	Competed
European Champion	Marianne Vos (NED)	Competed
Pan American Champion	Paola Muñoz (CHI)	Competed
Oceanian Champion	Lisen Hockings (AUS)	Did not compete

=== UCI World Ranking by Nations ===
Rankings as at 15 August 2017.

Rank	Nation	Points
1	Netherlands	4629.5
2	Italy	2655
3	Australia	2300.25
4	United States	2093
5	Great Britain	1759.5
6	Poland	1714.5
7	Belgium	1600.5
8	Denmark	1238
9	Germany	1202.5
10	Canada	1195.25

Rank	Nation	Points
11	Finland	992
12	South Africa	959
13	France	879.5
14	Norway	638.5
15	Spain	580.75
16	Sweden	578.75
17	Cuba	522
18	Luxembourg	467
19	Russia	431
20	Belarus	408

=== Participating nations ===
153 cyclists from 47 nations were entered in the women's road race, however Cuba's sole representative Marlies Mejías did not start the race. The number of cyclists per nation is shown in parentheses.

- Argentina (2)
- Australia (7)
- Austria (3)
- Azerbaijan (1)
- Belgium (4)
- Brazil (1)
- Canada (6)
- Chile (2)
- Colombia (3)
- Cuba (1) (did not start)
- Cyprus (1)
- Czech Republic (1)
- Denmark (7)
- Ethiopia (2)
- Finland (2)
- France (6)
- Germany (6)
- Great Britain (7)
- Greece (1)
- Hong Kong (3)
- Hungary (2)
- Ireland (1)
- Israel (3)
- Italy (7)
- Japan (2)
- Kazakhstan (3)
- Lithuania (3)
- Luxembourg (4)
- Mauritius (1)
- Mexico (2)
- Netherlands (8)
- New Zealand (2)
- Norway (6)
- Paraguay (1)
- Poland (6)
- Romania (1)
- Russia (5)
- Serbia (1)
- Singapore (1)
- Slovakia (1)
- Slovenia (3)
- South Africa (2)
- Spain (6)
- Sweden (5)
- Switzerland (3)
- Ukraine (1)
- United States (7)

== Final classification ==
Of the race's 153 entrants, 77 riders completed the full distance of 152.8 kilometres (94.9 miles).

Rank	Rider	Country	Time
1	Chantal Blaak	Netherlands	4h 06' 30"
2	Katrin Garfoot	Australia	+ 28"
3	Amalie Dideriksen	Denmark	+ 28"
4	Annemiek van Vleuten	Netherlands	+ 28"
5	Katarzyna Niewiadoma	Poland	+ 28"
6	Christine Majerus	Luxembourg	+ 28"
7	Susanne Andersen	Norway	+ 28"
8	Anna van der Breggen	Netherlands	+ 28"
9	Emilia Fahlin	Sweden	+ 28"
10	Elena Cecchini	Italy	+ 28"
11	Pauline Ferrand-Prévot	France	+ 28"
12	Leah Kirchmann	Canada	+ 28"
13	Lucinda Brand	Netherlands	+ 28"
14	Hannah Barnes	United Kingdom	+ 28"
15	Ellen van Dijk	Netherlands	+ 28"
16	Rasa Leleivytė	Lithuania	+ 28"
17	Sheyla Gutiérrez	Spain	+ 28"
18	Coryn Rivera	United States	+ 28"
19	Sarah Roy	Australia	+ 28"
20	Dani King	United Kingdom	+ 28"
21	Linda Villumsen	New Zealand	+ 28"
22	Urša Pintar	Slovenia	+ 28"
23	Gracie Elvin	Australia	+ 28"
24	Shara Gillow	Australia	+ 28"
25	Martina Ritter	Austria	+ 28"
26	Janneke Ensing	Netherlands	+ 28"
27	Polona Batagelj	Slovenia	+ 28"
28	Olga Zabelinskaya	Russia	+ 28"
29	Vita Heine	Norway	+ 28"
30	Ann-Sophie Duyck	Belgium	+ 28"
31	Paula Patiño	Colombia	+ 28"
32	Margarita Victoria García	Spain	+ 28"
33	Karol-Ann Canuel	Canada	+ 28"
34	Íngrid Drexel	Mexico	+ 28"
35	Eugenia Bujak	Poland	+ 28"
36	Hanna Nilsson	Sweden	+ 28"
37	Élise Delzenne	France	+ 28"
38	Cecilie Uttrup Ludwig	Denmark	+ 36"
39	Tatiana Guderzo	Italy	+ 36"
40	Audrey Cordon	France	+ 37"
41	Amanda Spratt	Australia	+ 38"
42	Lizzie Deignan	United Kingdom	+ 38"
43	Lisa Brennauer	Germany	+ 1' 19"
44	Ramona Forchini	Switzerland	+ 1' 19"
45	Amy Pieters	Netherlands	+ 1' 19"
46	Giorgia Bronzini	Italy	+ 1' 19"
47	Rossella Ratto	Italy	+ 1' 34"
48	Marianne Vos	Netherlands	+ 1' 50"
49	Hayley Simmonds	United Kingdom	+ 2' 31"
50	Lisa Klein	Germany	+ 2' 31"
51	Eri Yonamine	Japan	+ 2' 31"
52	Trixi Worrack	Germany	+ 2' 31"
53	Diana Peñuela	Colombia	+ 3' 53"
54	Rachel Neylan	Australia	+ 4' 01"
55	Romy Kasper	Germany	+ 4' 01"
56	Eider Merino Cortazar	Spain	+ 4' 18"
57	Anastasiia Iakovenko	Russia	+ 4' 43"
58	Alison Jackson	Canada	+ 4' 43"
59	Chloe Hosking	Australia	+ 4' 43"
60	Georgia Williams	New Zealand	+ 4' 43"
61	Lauren Stephens	United States	+ 4' 43"
62	Nikola Nosková	Czech Republic	+ 4' 43"
63	Stine Borgli	Norway	+ 5' 51"
64	Camilla Møllebro	Denmark	+ 5' 51"
65	Olga Shekel	Ukraine	+ 5' 51"
66	Pernille Mathiesen	Denmark	+ 5' 57"
67	Elinor Barker	United Kingdom	+ 6' 36"
68	Lex Albrecht	Canada	+ 8' 38"
69	Sara Bergen	Canada	+ 9' 37"
70	Omer Shapira	Israel	+ 9' 37"
71	Ruth Winder	United States	+ 9' 37"
72	Sofia Bertizzolo	Italy	+ 9' 37"
73	Amber Neben	United States	+ 13' 06"
74	Kirsti Lay	Canada	+ 14' 02"
75	Kseniya Dobrynina	Russia	+ 14' 02"
76	Eugénie Duval	France	+ 14' 52"
77	Aude Biannic	France	+ 14' 52"

Rider	Country	Time
Charlotte Becker	Germany	DNF
Katie Hall	United States	DNF
Claudia Lichtenberg	Germany	DNF
Emilie Moberg	Norway	DNF
Makhabbat Umutzhanova	Kazakhstan	DNF
Tayler Wiles	United States	DNF
Julie Leth	Denmark	DNF
Alba Teruel Ribes	Spain	DNF
Špela Kern	Slovenia	DNF
Barbara Benkó	Hungary	DNF
Linda Indergand	Switzerland	DNF
Ashleigh Moolman	South Africa	DNF
Juliette Labous	France	DNF
Anna Plichta	Poland	DNF
Ewelina Szybiak	Poland	DNF
Katrine Aalerud	Norway	DNF
Antri Christoforou	Cyprus	DNF
Alice Barnes	United Kingdom	DNF
Melissa Lowther	United Kingdom	DNF
Jolien D'Hoore	Belgium	DNF
Elisa Balsamo	Italy	DNF
Elisa Longo Borghini	Italy	DNF
Mónika Király	Hungary	DNF
Ana Sanabria	Colombia	DNF
Agua Marina Espínola	Paraguay	DNF
Jelena Erić	Serbia	DNF
Małgorzata Jasińska	Poland	DNF
Nicole Hanselmann	Switzerland	DNF
Marta Lach	Poland	DNF
Wing Yee Leung	Hong Kong	DNF
Anna Potokina	Russia	DNF
Maria Yapura Plaza	Argentina	DNF
Olena Pavlukhina	Azerbaijan	DNF
Varvara Fasoi	Greece	DNF
Christina Perchtold	Austria	DNF
Natalya Saifutdinova	Kazakhstan	DNF
Elise Maes	Luxembourg	DNF
Lydia Boylan	Ireland	DNF
Lourdes Oyarbide	Spain	DNF
Alicia González Blanco	Spain	DNF
Yumi Kajihara	Japan	DNF
Kelly Van den Steen	Belgium	DNF
Megan Guarnier	United States	DNF
Lotta Lepistö	Finland	DNF
Ingrid Moe	Norway	DNF
Claire Faber	Luxembourg	DNF
Sara Penton	Sweden	DNF
Eyeru Tesfoam Gebru	Ethiopia	DNF
Daiva Tušlaitė	Lithuania	DNF
Christina Siggaard	Denmark	DNF
Trine Schmidt	Denmark	DNF
Amiliya Iskakova	Kazakhstan	DNF
Estefania Pilz	Argentina	DNF
Chantal Hoffmann	Luxembourg	DNF
Alexandra Nessmar	Sweden	DNF
Aurelie Halbwachs	Mauritius	DNF
Alžbeta Bačíková	Slovakia	DNF
Brenda Santoyo	Mexico	DNF
Ana Maria Covrig	Romania	DNF
Rotem Gafinovitz	Israel	DNF
Kathrin Schweinberger	Austria	DNF
Justina Jovaišytė	Lithuania	DNF
Serene Lee	Singapore	DNF
Svetlana Kuznetsova	Russia	DNF
Aranza Villalón	Chile	DNF
Pang Yao	Hong Kong	DNF
Chane Jonker	South Africa	DNF
Yang Qianyu	Hong Kong	DNF
Nicolle Borges	Brazil	DNF
Paola Muñoz	Chile	DNF
Laura Vainionpää	Finland	DNF
Jessy Druyts	Belgium	DNF
Hilla Yizhaq	Israel	DNF
Selam Amha	Ethiopia	DNF
Julia Karlsson	Sweden	DNF
Marlies Mejías	Cuba	DNS
