= 2014 Open de Suède Vårgårda =

2014 UCI Women's Road World Cup, race 8 of 9

Race details
- Dates: 24 August 2014
- Stages: 1
- Distance: 132 km (82 mi)
- Winning time: 3h 26' 21"

Results
	Winner	Chantal Blaak (NED)	(Specialized–lululemon)
	Second	Amy Pieters (NED)	(Team Giant–Shimano)
	Third	Roxane Knetemann (NED)	(Rabobank-Liv Woman Cycling Team)

The 2014 Open de Suède Vårgårda was the ninth edition of the Open de Suède Vårgårda women's road race. It was held on 24 August 2014 over a distance of 132 kilometres (82.0 miles) and was the eighth race of the 2014 UCI Women's Road World Cup season.

== Results ==
	Rider	Team	Time
1	Chantal Blaak (NED)	Specialized–lululemon	3h 26' 22"
2	Amy Pieters (NED)	Team Giant–Shimano	s.t.
3	Roxane Knetemann (NED)	Rabobank-Liv Woman Cycling Team	s.t.
4	Marianne Vos (NED)	Rabobank-Liv Woman Cycling Team	+ 5"
5	Kirsten Wild (NED)	Team Giant–Shimano	+ 5"
6	Lisa Brennauer (GER)	Specialized–lululemon	+ 5"
7	Annemiek van Vleuten (NED)	Rabobank-Liv Woman Cycling Team	+ 5"
8	Lizzie Armitstead (GBR)	Boels–Dolmans	+ 5"
9	Lucinda Brand (NED)	Rabobank-Liv Woman Cycling Team	+ 5"
10	Emma Johansson (SWE)	Orica–AIS	+ 5"

== World Cup standings ==
Standings after 8 of 9 2014 UCI Women's Road World Cup races.

=== Individuals ===
	Cyclist	Team	World Cup points
1	Lizzie Armitstead (GBR)	Boels–Dolmans	480
2	Emma Johansson (SWE)	Orica–AIS	340
3	Kirsten Wild (NED)	Team Giant–Shimano	290
4	Anna van der Breggen (NED)	Rabobank-Liv Woman Cycling Team	286
5	Marianne Vos (NED)	Rabobank-Liv Woman Cycling Team	270
6	Ellen van Dijk (NED)	Boels–Dolmans	269
7	Chantal Blaak (NED)	Specialized–lululemon	225
8	Giorgia Bronzini (ITA)	Wiggle–Honda	225
9	Elisa Longo Borghini (ITA)	Hitec Products	215
10	Pauline Ferrand-Prévot (FRA)	Rabobank-Liv Woman Cycling Team	200

Team: Rabobank-Liv Woman Cycling Team
Mountain: Vera Koedooder
Sprint: Iris Slappendel
Youth: Elena Cecchini
