= 2016 Tour of Flanders for Women =

2016 Tour of Flanders
2016 UCI Women's World Tour, race 5 of 17

Race details
- Dates: 3 April 2016
- Stages: 1
- Distance: 141.2 km (87.7 mi)
- Winning time: 3h 53' 38"

Results
	Winner	Lizzie Armitstead (GBR)	(Boels–Dolmans)
	Second	Emma Johansson (SWE)	(Wiggle High5)
	Third	Chantal Blaak (NED)	(Boels–Dolmans)

The 2016 Tour of Flanders for Women was the 13th running of the women's Tour of Flanders, a women's bicycle race in Belgium. It was held on 3 April 2016, as the fifth race of the inaugural World Tour season over a distance of 141.2 kilometres (87.7 miles), starting and finishing in Oudenaarde. Britain's Lizzie Armitstead won the race in a two-woman sprint with Sweden's Emma Johansson.

== Race Summary ==
Emma Johansson accelerated on the top of Oude Kwaremont, 17 km from the finish, followed by Lizzie Armitstead. The duo powered on over the Paterberg and held a small lead over a group of eight until the finish. In the sprint, Armitstead narrowly beat Johansson at the line.

== Results ==
Result
Rank	Rider	Team	Time
1	Lizzie Armitstead (GBR)	Boels–Dolmans	3h 53' 38"
2	Emma Johansson (SWE)	Wiggle High5	s.t.
3	Chantal Blaak (NED)	Boels–Dolmans	+ 4"
4	Megan Guarnier (USA)	Boels–Dolmans	+ 4"
5	Elisa Longo Borghini (ITA)	Wiggle High5	+ 4"
6	Ellen van Dijk (NED)	Boels–Dolmans	+ 4"
7	Annemiek van Vleuten (NED)	Orica–AIS	+ 4"
8	Pauline Ferrand-Prévot (FRA)	Rabobank-Liv Woman Cycling Team	+ 4"
9	Claudia Lichtenberg (GER)	Lotto–Soudal Ladies	+ 4"
10	Katarzyna Niewiadoma (POL)	Rabobank-Liv Woman Cycling Team	+ 4"
