= 2010 Tour of Flanders for Women =

2010 UCI Women's Road World Cup

Race details
- Dates: 4 April 2010
- Stages: 1
- Distance: 119.3 km (74.1 mi)
- Winning time: 3h 09' 27"

Results
	Winner	Grace Verbeke (BEL)
	Second	Marianne Vos (NED)
	Third	Kirsten Wild (NED)

The seventh edition of the Tour of Flanders for Women cycling race was held on 4 April 2010. The race started in Oudenaarde and finished in Meerbeke. It was the second leg of the 2010 UCI Women's Road World Cup. The event was won by Belgian rider Grace Verbeke.

== Race summary ==
Dutchwoman Adrie Visser and Belgian Grace Verbeke broke away on the Molenberg, the third climb of the day after 75 km, and continued to work together until the Bosberg. On the Bosberg, the last climb of the day, Verbeke left Visser behind and soloed to Meerbeke to narrowly stay ahead of the sprinting group. Marianne Vos won the sprint for second place before Kirsten Wild. Visser, caught by the returning group, finished fifth.

== Results ==
Final general classification

Rank	Rider	Team	Time
1	Grace Verbeke (BEL)	Lotto Ladies Team	3h 09' 27"
2	Marianne Vos (NED)	Nederland bloeit	+ 3"
3	Kirsten Wild (NED)	Cervélo TestTeam	s.t.
4	Emma Johansson (SWE)	Red Sun	s.t.
5	Adrie Visser (NED)	Team HTC–Columbia Women	s.t.
6	Chantal Blaak (NED)	leontien.nl	s.t.
7	Noemi Cantele (ITA)	Team HTC–Columbia Women	s.t.
8	Judith Arndt (GER)	Team HTC–Columbia Women	s.t.
9	Regina Bruins (NED)	Cervélo TestTeam	+ 8"
10	Annemiek van Vleuten (NED)	Nederland bloeit	+ 51"
