= 2019 Omloop Het Nieuwsblad (women's race) =

Race details
- Dates: 2 March 2019
- Stages: 1
- Distance: 122.9 km (76.4 mi)
- Winning time: 3h 20' 58"

Results
	Winner	Chantal van den Broek-Blaak (NED)	(Boels–Dolmans)
	Second	Marta Bastianelli (ITA)	(Team Virtu Cycling)
	Third	Jip Van Den Bos (NED)	(Boels–Dolmans)

The 2019 Omloop Het Nieuwsblad was the 14th edition of the Omloop Het Nieuwsblad road cycling one day race, which was held on 2 March. Widely regarded as the start of the Classics season, it was a 1.1 event on the women's international calendar. The race started in Ghent and finished in Ninove.

== Teams ==
Twenty-four teams participated in the race. Each team had a maximum of six riders.

Participating teams

- Team Virtu Cycling
- Lotto–Soudal Ladies
- Doltcini–Van Eyck Sport
- Health Mate–Cyclelive Team
- WCC Team
- Alé–Cipollini
- Bigla Pro Cycling
- Bepink
- Boels–Dolmans
- BTC City Ljubljana
- Canyon//SRAM
- FDJ Nouvelle-Aquitaine Futuroscope
- Hitec Products–Birk Sport
- Mitchelton–Scott
- Movistar Team
- Parkhotel Valkenburg
- Team Sunweb
- Trek–Segafredo
- Valcar–Cylance
- CCC - Liv
- Isorex No-Aqua Ladies Cycling Team
- Keukens Redant Cycling Team
- Multum Accountants Ladies Team
- Rogelli-Gyproc U-23

== Results ==
Final general classification
Rank	Rider	Team	Time
1	Chantal van den Broek-Blaak (NED)	Boels–Dolmans	3h 20' 58"
2	Marta Bastianelli (ITA)	Team Virtu Cycling	+ 1' 09"
3	Jip van den Bos (NED)	Boels–Dolmans	+ 1' 09"
4	Annemiek van Vleuten (NED)	Mitchelton–Scott	+ 1' 09"
5	Alexis Magner (USA)	Canyon//SRAM	+ 1' 09"
6	Jeanne Korevaar (NED)	CCC - Liv	+ 1' 09"
7	Aude Biannic (FRA)	Movistar Team	+ 1' 09"
8	Sofie De Vuyst (BEL)	Parkhotel Valkenburg	+ 1' 09"
9	Christina Siggaard (DEN)	Team Virtu Cycling	+ 1' 09"
10	Floortje Mackaij (NED)	Team Sunweb	+ 1' 09"

== See also ==
- 2019 in women's road cycling
