= Ronde van Drenthe =

Dutch one-day road cycling race

Race details
- Date: Early-March
- Region: Drenthe, Netherlands
- English name: Tour of Drenthe
- Local name: Ronde van Drenthe
- Discipline: Road race
- Competition: UCI Europe Tour
- Type: Single day race
- Web site: www.rondevandrenthe.nl

History (men)
- First edition: 1960
- Editions: 62 (as of 2023)
- Final edition: 2023
- First winner: Jurrie Dokter (NED)
- Most wins: Henk Mutsaars (NED); Ron Snijders (NED); Allard Engels (NED); Anthony Theus (NED); Rudie Kemna (NED) (2 wins)
- Final winner: Per Strand Hagenes (NOR)

History (women)
- First edition: 2008
- Editions: 17 (as of 2024)
- First winner: Adrie Visser (NED)
- Most wins: Lorena Wiebes (NED) (4 wins)
- Final winner: Lorena Wiebes (NED)

Ronde van Drenthe (English: Tour of Drenthe) was an elite men's and women's professional road bicycle racing event held annually in the Drenthe, Netherlands and sanctioned by the Royal Dutch Cycling Union. The women's event was part of the UCI Women's World Tour, and the men's event was part of the UCI Europe Tour.

In 2024, organisers announced that the race had been cancelled, owing to increasing costs, regulations and lack of support from the police.

== History ==
=== Men's event ===
The race was first held in 1960 as an amateur event. Since 2005, the men's event has been part of the UCI Europe Tour. It became a 1.HC race in 2017. Between 2010 and 2015, Dwars door Drenthe was held on the same weekend as the Ronde van Drenthe. In 2011, Ronde van Drenthe and Dwars door Drenthe were held as a combined stage race, with each day retaining its own branding. The events reverted to being separate events in 2012.

In November 2023, organisers announced that the men's race would not be held from 2024 onwards. The women's event would continue. Organisers stated the cancellation was due to increasing costs, regulations and lack of support from the police.

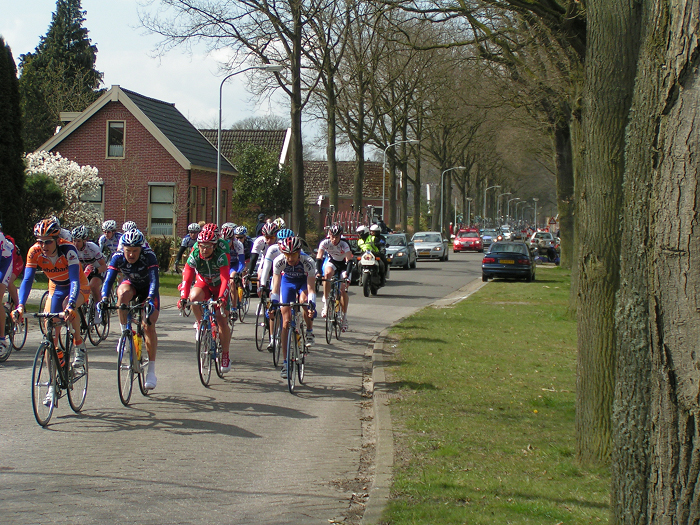
2008 Ronde van Drenthe

=== Women's event ===
A women's event was first held in 1998 as Novilon Eurocup, a one-day race. Between 2003 and 2006, this was held as a three-day event. In 2007, these three stages were replaced by three one-day races - the Novilon Eurocup, Drenthe 8 of Dwingeloo and Ronde van Drenthe. In 2015, the Novilon Eurocup was held for the last time, and the Drenthe 8 became Drentse 8 van Westerveld.

The first edition of Ronde van Drenthe in 2007 was part of the UCI Women's Road World Cup, and the race became part of the UCI Women's World Tour in 2016. Dutch rider Lorena Wiebes won the event four times in a row from 2021 to 2024. In 2024, organisers announced that the women's race would not be held from 2025 onwards, thereby cancelling the event. Organisers stated the cancellation was due to increasing costs, regulations and lack of support from the police.

== Route ==
The races used generally flat roads in the Drenthe region of the Netherlands, with the challenge being multiple ascents of the VAM-berg – a hill built on a landfill site. The climb was 750m in length with an average gradient of 4.2% and a maximum gradient of 20%. Other difficulties were the ten cobbled sections on the route.

== Men's past winners ==
Year	Country	Rider	Team
1960	Netherlands	Jurrie Dokter	
1961	Netherlands	Cees De Jongh	
1962	No race		
1963	No race		
1964	Netherlands	Bart Solaro	
1965	Netherlands	Roel Hendriks	
1966	Netherlands	Piet Tesselaar	
1967	Netherlands	Leen De Groot	
1968	Netherlands	Jan van Katwijk	
1969	Netherlands	Ben Janbroers	
1970	Netherlands	Popke Oosterhof	
1971	Netherlands	Julles Bruessing	
1972	Netherlands	Hennie Kuiper	
1973	Netherlands	Gerrie van Gerwen	
1974	Netherlands	Co Hoogendoorn	
1975	Netherlands	Jimmy Kruunenburg	
1976	Netherlands	Wil van Helvoirt	
1977	Netherlands	Joop Ribbers	
1978	Netherlands	Henk Mutsaars	
1979	Netherlands	Wim de Waal	
1980	Netherlands	Henk Mutsaars	
1981	Netherlands	Ron Snijders	
1982	Netherlands	Hans Baudoin	
1983	Netherlands	Ron Snijders	
1984	Netherlands	Antoon van der Steen	
1985	Netherlands	Henk Boeve	
1986	Netherlands	Dick Dekker	
1987	Netherlands	Richard Luppes	
1988	Netherlands	Stephan Räkers	
1989	Netherlands	Eric Knuvers	
1990	Netherlands	Gerard Kemper	
1991	Netherlands	Allard Engels	
1992	Netherlands	Paul Konings	
1993	Netherlands	Allard Engels	
1994	Netherlands	Anthony Theus	
1995	Netherlands	Pascal Appeldoorn	
1996	Netherlands	Karsten Kroon	
1997	Netherlands	Anthony Theus	
1998	Netherlands	Remco van der Ven	TVM–Farm Frites
1999	Netherlands	Jans Koerts	Team Cologne
2000	Belgium	Andy de Smet	Spar-OKI
2001	No race due to foot-and-mouth disease		
2002	Netherlands	Rudie Kemna	BankGiroLoterij–Batavus
2003	Netherlands	Rudie Kemna	BankGiroLoterij
2004	Netherlands	Erik Dekker	Rabobank
2005	Germany	Marcel Sieberg	Team Lamonta
2006	Germany	Markus Eichler	Team Regiostrom-Senges
2007	Netherlands	Martijn Maaskant	Rabobank Continental Team
2008	Netherlands	Coen Vermeltfoort	Rabobank Continental Team
2009	Italy	Maurizio Biondo	Ceramica Flaminia–Bossini Docce
2010	Italy	Alberto Ongarato	Vacansoleil
2011	Netherlands	Kenny Van Hummel	Skil–Shimano
2012	Netherlands	Bert-Jan Lindeman	Vacansoleil–DCM
2013	Sweden	Alexander Wetterhall	NetApp–Endura
2014	Belgium	Kenny Dehaes	Lotto–Belisol
2015	Belgium	Edward Theuns	Topsport Vlaanderen–Baloise
2016	Netherlands	Jesper Asselman	Roompot–Oranje Peloton
2017	Netherlands	Jan-Willem van Schip	Delta Cycling Rotterdam
2018	Czech Republic	František Sisr	CCC–Sprandi–Polkowice
2019	Netherlands	Pim Ligthart	Direct Énergie
2020	No race due to COVID-19 pandemic		
2021	Belgium	Rune Herregodts	Sport Vlaanderen–Baloise
2022	Belgium	Dries Van Gestel	Team TotalEnergies
2023	Norway	Per Strand Hagenes	Team Jumbo–Visma

== Women's past winners ==
=== Novilon Eurocup ===
Year	First	Second	Third
1998	(Germany) Viola Paulitz-Müller	(Belgium) Vanja Vonckx	(Netherlands) Arenda Grimberg
1999	(Netherlands) Leontien van Moorsel	(Netherlands) Mirjam Melchers	(France) Catherine Marsal
2000	(Sweden) Madeleine Lindberg	(Netherlands) Marielle van Scheppingen-Romme	(United Kingdom) Ceris Gilfillan
2001	No race due to Foot-and-mouth disease		
2002	(Netherlands) Leontien van Moorsel	(Netherlands) Chantal Beltman	(Germany) Tanja Hennes
2003	(Netherlands) Mirjam Melchers	(Netherlands) Ghita Beltman	(United Kingdom) Rachel Heal
2004	(Netherlands) Sissy van Alebeek	(Netherlands) Kirsten Wild	(Netherlands) Sharon van Essen
2005	(Netherlands) Suzanne de Goede	(Denmark) Linda Villumsen	(Germany) Judith Arndt
2006	(Netherlands) Loes Markerink	(Germany) Trixi Worrack	(Netherlands) Kirsten Wild
2007	(Italy) Giorgia Bronzini	(Netherlands) Marianne Vos	(Germany) Ina-Yoko Teutenberg
2008	(United States) Kristin Armstrong	(Netherlands) Regina Bruins	(Netherlands) Kirsten Wild
2009	(Netherlands) Marianne Vos	(Germany) Trixi Worrack	(Sweden) Emma Johansson
2010	(Netherlands) Annemiek van Vleuten	(Germany) Ina-Yoko Teutenberg	(Netherlands) Kirsten Wild
2011	(Netherlands) Suzanne de Goede	(Germany) Marlen Joehrend	(Netherlands) Natalie van Gogh
2012	(Netherlands) Marianne Vos	(Italy) Marta Bastianelli	(United Kingdom) Lizzie Armitstead
2013	Not held		
2014	(Netherlands) Kirsten Wild	(United States) Shelley Olds	(Sweden) Emma Johansson
2015	(Netherlands) Kirsten Wild	(Australia) Chloe Hosking	(Luxembourg) Christine Majerus

=== Drentse 8 van Dwingeloo / Acht van Westerveld ===
Year	First	Second	Third
2007	(Germany) Regina Schleicher	(Netherlands) Marianne Vos	(Germany) Ina-Yoko Teutenberg
2008	(Germany) Ina-Yoko Teutenberg	(Germany) Regina Schleicher	(Australia) Rochelle Gilmore
2009	(Germany) Ina-Yoko Teutenberg	(Germany) Regina Schleicher	(Netherlands) Kirsten Wild
2010	(Germany) Ina-Yoko Teutenberg	(Sweden) Emma Johansson	(Netherlands) Annemiek van Vleuten
2011	(Netherlands) Marianne Vos	(United States) Shelley Olds	(Sweden) Emma Johansson
2012	(Australia) Chloe Hosking	(Italy) Giorgia Bronzini	(Netherlands) Marianne Vos
2013	(Netherlands) Marianne Vos	(Italy) Giorgia Bronzini	(Sweden) Emma Johansson
2014	(Netherlands) Chantal Blaak	(United Kingdom) Lucy Garner	(United Kingdom) Lizzie Armitstead
2015	(Italy) Giorgia Bronzini	(Italy) Valentina Scandolara	(Netherlands) Annemiek van Vleuten
2016	(Canada) Leah Kirchmann	(Luxembourg) Christine Majerus	(Netherlands) Anouska Koster
2017	(Australia) Chloe Hosking	(Belgium) Lotte Kopecky	(Denmark) Amalie Dideriksen
2018	(United States) Alexis Ryan	(Belgium) Jolien D'Hoore	(Australia) Chloe Hosking
2019	(France) Audrey Cordon-Ragot	(Netherlands) Amy Pieters	(Italy) Marta Bastianelli
2020	Not held		
2021	(Netherlands) Chantal van den Broek-Blaak	(Netherlands) Charlotte Kool	(Italy) Eleonora Gasparrini
2022	(Luxembourg) Christine Majerus	(Canada) Alison Jackson	(Netherlands) Floortje Mackaij
2023	Race cancelled due to weather conditions		
2024	(Netherlands) Sofie van Rooijen	(Italy) Chiara Consonni	(Italy) Rachele Barbieri

=== Ronde van Drenthe ===
Year	First	Second	Third
2007	(Netherlands) Adrie Visser	(France) Élodie Touffet	(Netherlands) Marianne Vos
2008	(Netherlands) Chantal Beltman	(Netherlands) Marianne Vos	(Germany) Ina-Yoko Teutenberg
2009	(Sweden) Emma Johansson	(Netherlands) Loes Gunnewijk	(Netherlands) Chantal Blaak
2010	(Netherlands) Loes Gunnewijk	(Netherlands) Annemiek van Vleuten	(Italy) Giorgia Bronzini
2011	(Netherlands) Marianne Vos	(Netherlands) Kirsten Wild	(Italy) Giorgia Bronzini
2012	(Netherlands) Marianne Vos	(Netherlands) Kirsten Wild	(Sweden) Emma Johansson
2013	(Netherlands) Marianne Vos	(Netherlands) Ellen van Dijk	(Sweden) Emma Johansson
2014	(United Kingdom) Lizzie Armitstead	(Netherlands) Anna van der Breggen	(United States) Shelley Olds
2015	(Belgium) Jolien D'Hoore	(Netherlands) Amy Pieters	(Netherlands) Ellen van Dijk
2016	(Netherlands) Chantal Blaak	(Australia) Gracie Elvin	(Germany) Trixi Worrack
2017	(Denmark) Amalie Dideriksen	(Italy) Elena Cecchini	(Netherlands) Lucinda Brand
2018	(Netherlands) Amy Pieters	(United States) Alexis Ryan	(Australia) Chloe Hosking
2019	(Italy) Marta Bastianelli	(Netherlands) Chantal Blaak	(Netherlands) Ellen van Dijk
2020	Not held		
2021	(Netherlands) Lorena Wiebes	(Italy) Elena Cecchini	(Italy) Eleonora Gasparrini
2022	(Netherlands) Lorena Wiebes	(Italy) Elisa Balsamo	(Belgium) Lotte Kopecky
2023	(Netherlands) Lorena Wiebes	(Norway) Susanne Andersen	(Netherlands) Maike van der Duin
2024	(Netherlands) Lorena Wiebes	(Italy) Elisa Balsamo	(Netherlands) Puck Pieterse
