= 2017 Tour of Flanders for Women =

2017 Tour of Flanders
2017 UCI Women's World Tour, race 5 of 20
- Event poster with previous winner Lizzie Armitstead

Race details
- Dates: 2 April 2017
- Stages: 1
- Distance: 153.2 km (95.2 mi)
- Winning time: 4h 02' 38"

Results
	Winner	Coryn Rivera (USA)	(Team Sunweb)
	Second	Gracie Elvin (AUS)	(Orica–Scott)
	Third	Chantal Blaak (NED)	(Boels–Dolmans)

UCI Report

The 2017 Tour of Flanders for Women was the 14th running of the Tour of Flanders for Women, a women's bicycle race in Belgium. It was held on 2 April 2017, as the fifth race of the 2017 UCI Women's World Tour season over a distance of 153.2 kilometres (95.2 miles).

After a four-rider move was caught with 1.2 kilometres (0.75 miles) remaining, the race ended in a bunch sprint of 19 riders; for the second time in three World Tour races, it was American rider Coryn Rivera (Team Sunweb) that was the victor as the first American to win an edition of the Tour of Flanders, edging out Australia's Gracie Elvin from the Orica–Scott team who was the first Australian to podium at this race, while the podium was completed by Boels–Dolmans rider Chantal Blaak from the Netherlands.

== Route ==
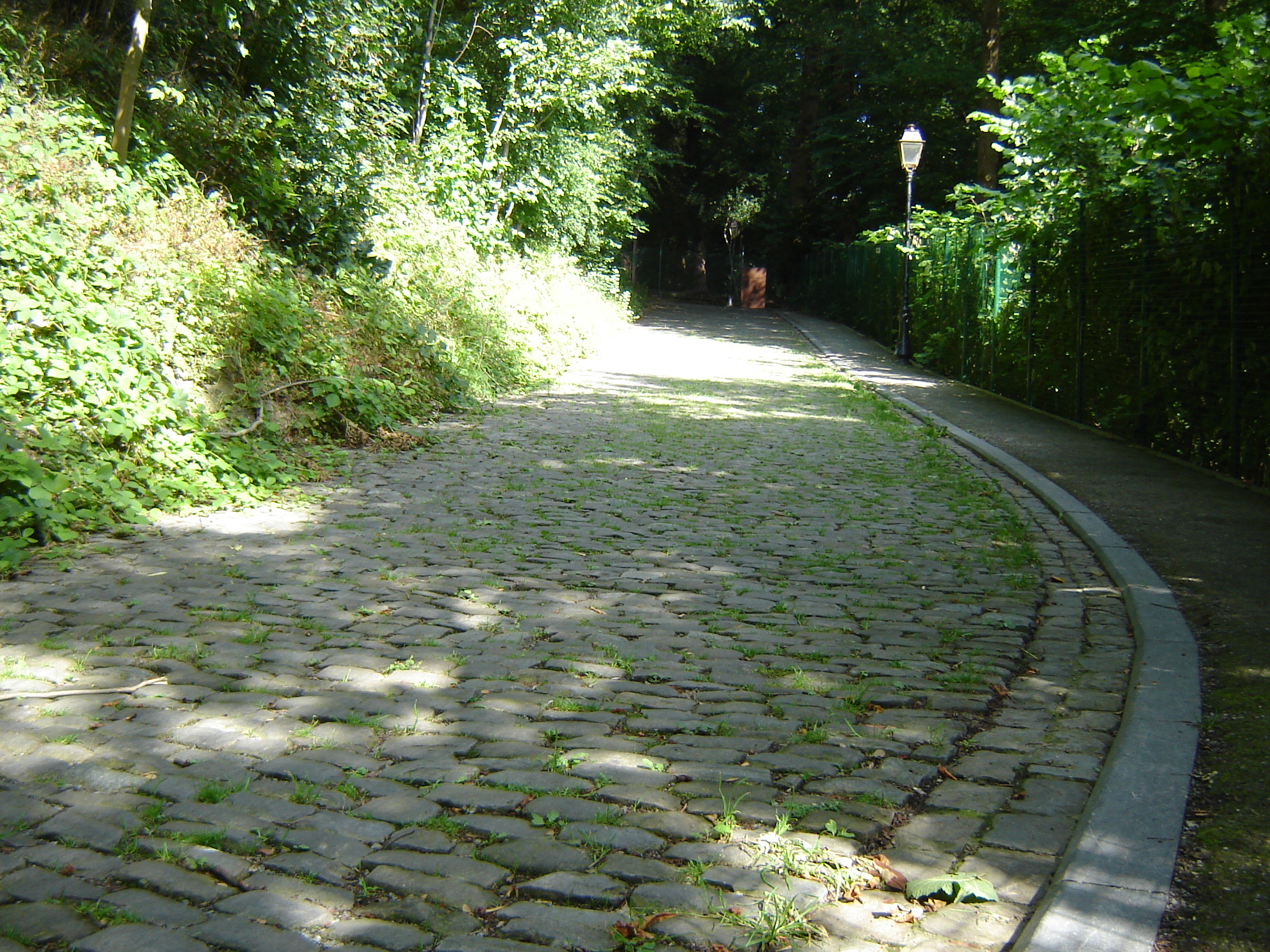
The Muur van Geraardsbergen was the seventh of 12 climbs.

The race started and finished in Oudenaarde, for a total distance of 153.2 kilometres (95.2 miles). The first 80 kilometres (50 miles) wound through the hills of the Zwalm region, before addressing the climbs in the Flemish Ardennes between Geraardsbergen and Oudenaarde. There were 12 categorised climbs and five sectors of flat cobbled roads.

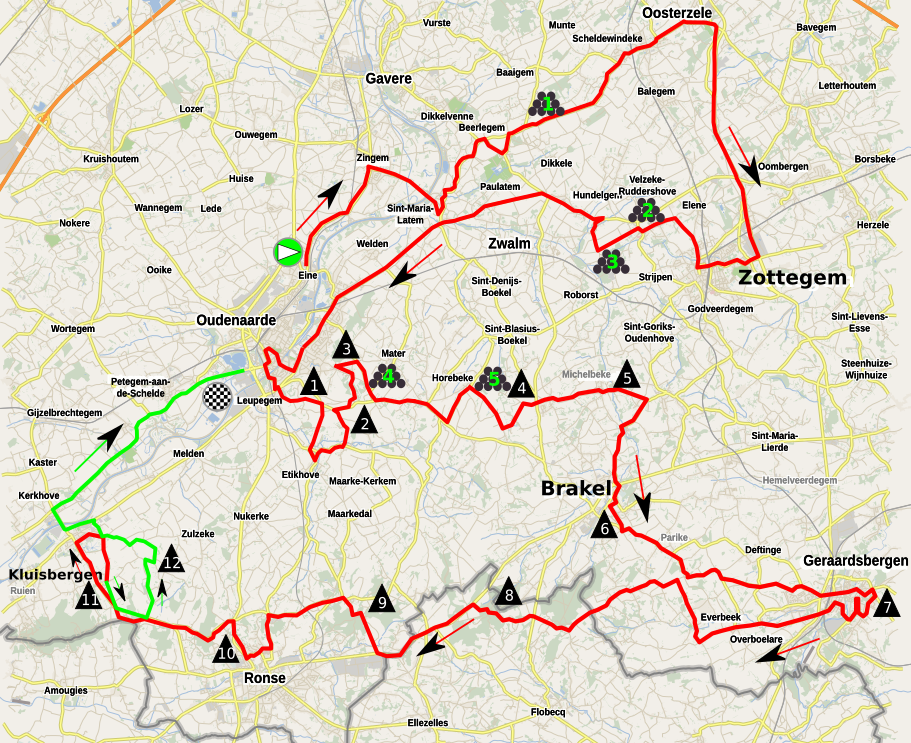
Map of the Tour of Flanders for Women 2017. Final in green.

=== Categorised climbs and cobbles ===
Climbs and cobbled sections in the 2017 Tour of Flanders
No.	Name	Distance from		Surface	Length (metres)	Gradient (%)	
No.	Name	Start (km)	Finish (km)	Surface	Length (metres)	(ave.)	(max.)
–	Lange Munte	15.5	137.7	cobbles	2470	—	
–	Lippenhovestraat	36.0	117.2	cobbles	1300	—	
–	Paddestraat	37.4	115.8	cobbles	1500	—	
1	Achterberg	56.0	97.2	asphalt	1500	4.3%	11%
2	Eikenberg	62.6	90.6	cobbles	1200	5.2%	10%
3	Wolvenberg	65.7	87.5	asphalt	645	7.9%	17.3%
–	Holleweg	65.8	87.4	cobbles	1500	—	
–	Haaghoek	71.5	81.7	cobbles	2000	—	
4	Leberg	74.5	78.7	asphalt	950	4.2%	13.8%
5	Berendries	78.6	74.6	asphalt	940	7%	12.3%
6	Tenbosse	83.5	69.7	asphalt	450	6.9%	8.7%
7	Muur van Geraardsbergen	93.9	59.3	cobbles	1075	9.3%	19.8%
8	La Houppe	112.5	40.7	asphalt	2800	3.3%	10%
9	Kanarieberg	118.3	34.9	asphalt	1000	7.7%	14%
10	Kruisberg–Hotond	126.7	26.5	cobbles–asphalt	2500	5%	9%
11	Oude Kwaremont	136.5	16.7	cobbles	2200	4%	11.6%
12	Paterberg	140.0	13.2	cobbles	360	12.9%	20.3%

== Teams ==
28 teams competed in the race.

UCI Women's Teams

- Alé–Cipollini
- Aromitalia Vaiano
- Astana
- Bepink–Cogeas
- Bizkaia–Durango
- Boels–Dolmans
- BTC City Ljubljana
- Canyon//SRAM
- Cervélo–Bigla Pro Cycling
- Cylance Pro Cycling
- Drops
- FDJ Nouvelle-Aquitaine Futuroscope
- Giusfredi–Bianchi
- Team Hitec Products
- Lares–Waowdeals
- Lensworld–Kuota
- Lointek
- Lotto–Soudal Ladies
- Orica–Scott
- Parkhotel Valkenburg–Destil
- S.C. Michela Fanini Rox
- Servetto Giusta
- Team Sunweb
- Top Girls Fassa Bortolo
- Wiggle High5
- Sport Vlaanderen–Etixx
- Team VéloCONCEPT
- WM3 Energie

== Result ==
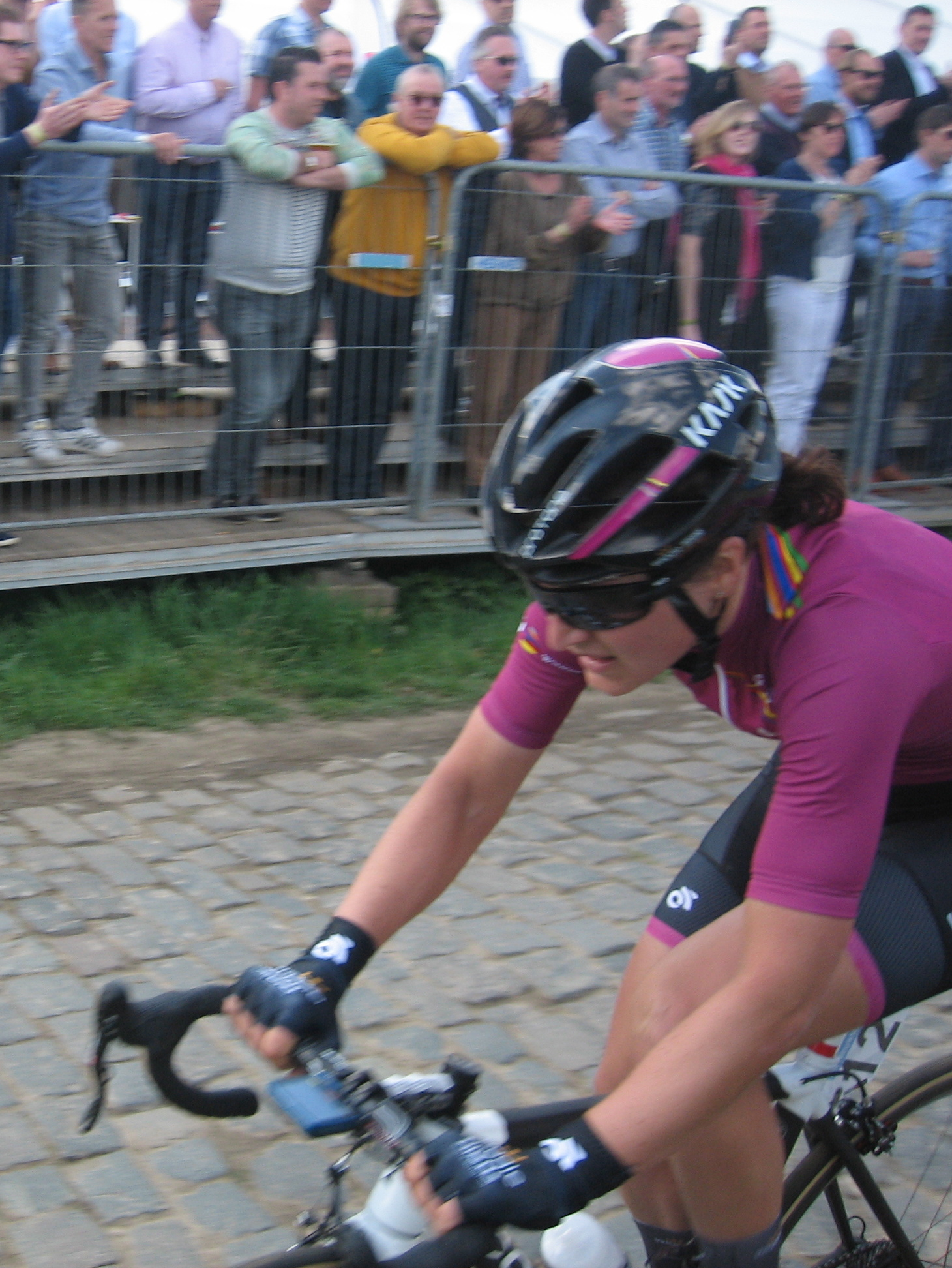
Elisa Longo Borghini (pictured at Oude Kwaremont) lost the Women's World Tour leader's jersey to race winner Coryn Rivera.

Result
Rank	Rider	Team	Time
1	Coryn Rivera (USA)	Team Sunweb	4h 02' 38"
2	Gracie Elvin (AUS)	Orica–Scott	+ 0"
3	Chantal Blaak (NED)	Boels–Dolmans	+ 0"
4	Annemiek van Vleuten (NED)	Orica–Scott	+ 0"
5	Lotte Kopecky (BEL)	Lotto–Soudal Ladies	+ 0"
6	Elena Cecchini (ITA)	Canyon//SRAM	+ 0"
7	Rasa Leleivytė (LTU)	Aromitalia Vaiano	+ 0"
8	Katarzyna Niewiadoma (POL)	WM3 Energie	+ 0"
9	Janneke Ensing (NED)	Alé–Cipollini	+ 0"
10	Elisa Longo Borghini (ITA)	Wiggle High5	+ 0"
