= 2011 Tour of Flanders for Women =

2011 UCI Women's Road World Cup

Race details
- Dates: 3 April 2011
- Stages: 1
- Distance: 129.9 km (80.7 mi)
- Winning time: 3h 36' 03"

Results
	Winner	Annemiek van Vleuten (NED)
	Second	Tatiana Antoshina (RUS)
	Third	Marianne Vos (NED)

The eighth Tour of Flanders for Women was held on 3 April 2011 and was won by Dutch rider Annemiek van Vleuten. It was the second leg of the 2011 UCI Women's Road World Cup. The race started in Oudenaarde and finished in Meerbeke for the last time, over a distance of 129.9 kilometres (80.7 miles).

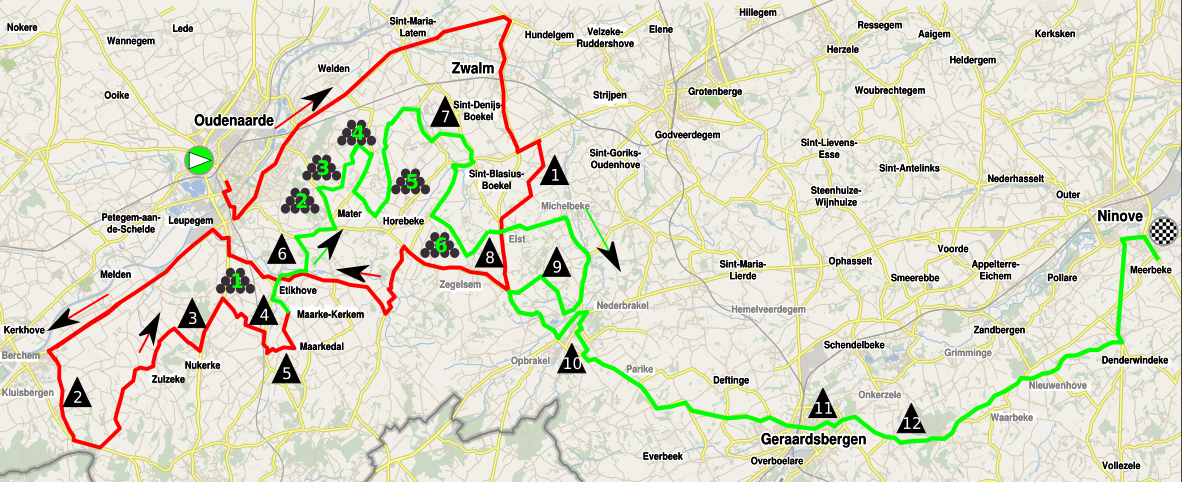
Circuit of the race

== Race Summary ==
On the Eikenberg, only 25 riders remained in the main peloton. After 85 km Sarah Düster broke away and was later joined by Ludivine Henrion. Düster and Henrion gained up to three minutes on the peloton, in which Emma Pooley led the pursuit. Düster broke clear on the Muur van Geraardsbergen but was caught at two kilometers from the finish. Tatiana Antoshina attacked in the final kilometers, but was countered by Annemiek van Vleuten who easily beat Antoshina in a two-up sprint. Marianne Vos won the sprint for third place.

== Results ==
Final general classification

Rank	Rider	Team	Time
1	Annemiek van Vleuten (NED)	Nederland bloeit	3h 36' 03"
2	Tatiana Antoshina (RUS)	Gauss	+ 1"
3	Marianne Vos (NED)	Nederland bloeit	+ 10"
4	Emma Johansson (SWE)	Hitec Products UCK	s.t.
5	Judith Arndt (GER)	HTC–Highroad Women	s.t.
6	Joëlle Numainville (CAN)	Team TIBCO–To The Top	s.t.
7	Grace Verbeke (BEL)	Topsport Vlaanderen–Ridley	s.t.
8	Ludivine Henrion (BEL)	Lotto–Honda Team	s.t.
9	Noemi Cantele (ITA)	Garmin–Cervélo	s.t.
10	Emma Pooley (GBR)	Garmin–Cervélo	s.t.
