= 2016 in women's road cycling =

2016 in women's road cycling is about the 2016 women's bicycle races ruled by the UCI and the 2016 UCI Women's Teams.

== World Championships ==
The World Road Championships is set to be held in Doha, Qatar.

	Race	Date	Winner	Second	Third
World Road Championships	Team Time Trial	9 October	(Netherlands) Boels–Dolmans	(Germany) Canyon//SRAM	(Germany) Cervélo–Bigla Pro Cycling
World Road Championships	Team Time Trial	9 October	Chantal Blaak (NED); Karol-Ann Canuel (CAN); Lizzie Deignan (GBR); Christine Majerus (LUX); Evelyn Stevens (USA); Ellen van Dijk (NED)	Alena Amialiusik (BLR); Hannah Barnes (GBR); Lisa Brennauer (GER); Elena Cecchini (ITA); Mieke Kröger (GER); Trixi Worrack (GER)	Ciara Horne (GBR); Lisa Klein (GER); Lotta Lepistö (FIN); Ashleigh Moolman (RSA); Joëlle Numainville (CAN); Stephanie Pohl (GER)
World Road Championships	Individual Time Trial	11 October	Amber Neben (USA)	Ellen van Dijk (NED)	Katrin Garfoot (AUS)
World Road Championships	Road Race	15 October	Amalie Dideriksen (DEN)	Kirsten Wild (NED)	Lotta Lepistö (FIN)

== UCI Women's WorldTour ==
Races in the 2016 UCI Women's World Tour
Race	Date	Winner	Second	Third	Leader
(Italy) Strade Bianche	5 March	Lizzie Armitstead (GBR); Boels–Dolmans	Katarzyna Niewiadoma (POL); Rabo–Liv	Emma Johansson (SWE); Wiggle High5	Lizzie Armitstead (GBR); Boels–Dolmans
(Netherlands) Ronde van Drenthe	12 March	Chantal Blaak (NED); Boels–Dolmans	Gracie Elvin (AUS); Orica–AIS	Trixi Worrack (DEU); Canyon//SRAM	Anna van der Breggen (NED); Rabo–Liv
(Italy) Trofeo Alfredo Binda-Comune di Cittiglio	20 March	Lizzie Armitstead (GBR); Boels–Dolmans	Megan Guarnier (USA); Boels–Dolmans	Jolanda Neff (SUI); Servetto Footon	Lizzie Armitstead (GBR); Boels–Dolmans
(Belgium) Gent–Wevelgem	27 March	Chantal Blaak (NED); Boels–Dolmans	Lisa Brennauer (DEU); Canyon//SRAM	Lucinda Brand (NED); Rabo–Liv	Chantal Blaak (NED); Boels–Dolmans
(Belgium) Tour of Flanders	3 April	Lizzie Armitstead (GBR); Boels–Dolmans	Emma Johansson (SWE); Wiggle High5	Chantal Blaak (NED); Boels–Dolmans	Lizzie Armitstead (GBR); Boels–Dolmans
(Belgium) La Flèche Wallonne Féminine	20 April	Anna van der Breggen (NED); Rabo–Liv	Evelyn Stevens (USA); Boels–Dolmans	Megan Guarnier (USA); Boels–Dolmans	Lizzie Armitstead (GBR); Boels–Dolmans
(China) Tour of Chongming Island	6 – 8 May	Chloe Hosking (AUS); Wiggle High5	Huang Ting-ying (TWN); Taiwan (national team)	Leah Kirchmann (CAN); Team Liv–Plantur	Lizzie Armitstead (GBR); Boels–Dolmans
(United States) Tour of California	19 – 22 May	Megan Guarnier (USA); Boels–Dolmans	Kristin Armstrong (USA); Twenty16–Ridebiker	Evelyn Stevens (USA); Boels–Dolmans	Megan Guarnier (USA); Boels–Dolmans
(United States) Philadelphia International Cycling Classic	5 June	Megan Guarnier (USA); Boels–Dolmans	Elisa Longo Borghini (ITA); Wiggle High5	Alena Amialiusik (BLR); Canyon//SRAM	Megan Guarnier (USA); Boels–Dolmans
(United Kingdom) The Women's Tour	15 – 19 June	Lizzie Armitstead (GBR); Boels–Dolmans	Ashleigh Moolman (RSA); Cervélo–Bigla Pro Cycling	Elisa Longo Borghini (ITA); Wiggle High5	Megan Guarnier (USA); Boels–Dolmans
(Italy) Giro d'Italia Internazionale Femminile	1 – 10 July	Megan Guarnier (USA); Boels–Dolmans	Evelyn Stevens (USA); Boels–Dolmans	Anna van der Breggen (NED); Rabo–Liv	Megan Guarnier (USA); Boels–Dolmans
La Course by Le Tour de France	24 July	Chloe Hosking (AUS); Wiggle High5	Lotta Lepistö (FIN); Cervélo–Bigla Pro Cycling	Marianne Vos (NED); Rabo–Liv	Megan Guarnier (USA); Boels–Dolmans
(United Kingdom) RideLondon Classique	30 July	Kirsten Wild (NED); Team Hitec Products	Nina Kessler (NED); Lensworld–Zannata	Leah Kirchmann (CAN); Team Liv–Plantur	Megan Guarnier (USA); Boels–Dolmans
(Sweden) Crescent Vårgårda UCI Women's WorldTour TTT	19 August	Boels–Dolmans	Cervélo–Bigla Pro Cycling	Rabo–Liv	Megan Guarnier (USA); Boels–Dolmans
(Sweden) Crescent Vårgårda UCI Women's WorldTour	21 August	Emilia Fahlin (SWE); Alé–Cipollini	Lotta Lepistö (FIN); Cervélo–Bigla Pro Cycling	Chantal Blaak (NED); Boels–Dolmans	Megan Guarnier (USA); Boels–Dolmans
(France) GP de Plouay-Bretagne	27 August	Eugenia Bujak (POL); BTC City Ljubljana	Elena Cecchini (ITA); Canyon//SRAM	Joëlle Numainville (CAN); Cervélo–Bigla Pro Cycling	Megan Guarnier (USA); Boels–Dolmans
(Spain) Madrid Challenge by la Vuelta	11 September	Jolien D'Hoore (BEL); Wiggle High5	Chloe Hosking (AUS); Wiggle High5	Marta Bastianelli (ITA); Alé–Cipollini	Megan Guarnier (USA); Boels–Dolmans
Points at single day races and general classifications (1st place onwards)				Stage points (in stage races)	
120, 100, 85, 70, 60, 50, 40, 35, 30, 25, 20, 18, 16, 14, 12, 10, 8, 6, 4, 2				25, 20, 18, 16, 14, 12, 10, 8, 6, 4	

== Single day races (1.1 and 1.2) ==
Race	Date	Cat. †	Winner	Second	Third
(Argentina) Gran Prix San Luis Femenino	January 9	1.2	(Poland) Małgorzata Jasińska	(United States) Coryn Rivera	(Italy) Anna Trevisi
(Thailand) Udon Thani's 123rd Anniversary International Cycling	January 17	1.2	(Thailand) Jutatip Maneephan	(Taiwan) Ting Ying Huang	(Taiwan) Hsiao Chia Tseng
(Australia) Cadel Evans Great Ocean Road Race	January 30	1.2	(Australia) Amanda Spratt	(Australia) Rachel Neylan	(United Kingdom) Dani King
(Slovenia) GP-Isola	February 27	1.1	Cancelled		
(Belgium) Omloop Het Nieuwsblad	February 27	1.1	(United Kingdom) Lizzie Armitstead	(Netherlands) Chantal Blaak	(Australia) Tiffany Cromwell
(Belgium) Omloop van het Hageland	February 28	1.1	(Italy) Marta Bastianelli	(Canada) Leah Kirchmann	(Finland) Lotta Lepistö
(Belgium) Le Samyn des Dames	March 2	1.2	(Netherlands) Chantal Blaak	(Sweden) Emma Johansson	(Netherlands) Amy Pieters
(Israel) Massada Arad	March 3	1.2	(Israel) Shani Bloch	(Israel) Paz Bash	(Cyprus) Antri Christoforou
(Israel) Arad Dimona Arad	March 4	1.2	(Cyprus) Antri Christoforou	(Israel) Paz Bash	(Israel) Shani Bloch
(Israel) Dead Sea–Scorpion Pass	March 5	1.2	(Cyprus) Antri Christoforou	(Israel) Shani Bloch	(Estonia) Liisi Rist
(Netherlands) Acht van Westerveld	March 13	1.2	(Canada) Leah Kirchmann	(Luxembourg) Christine Majerus	(Netherlands) Anouska Koster
(France) Cholet Pays de Loire Dames	March 20	1.2	Cancelled		
(Belgium) Pajot Hills Classic	March 30	1.2	(Netherlands) Marianne Vos	(United States) Megan Guarnier	(Finland) Lotta Lepisto
(Belgium) Grand Prix de Dottignies	April 4	1.2	(Italy) Giorgia Bronzini	(Italy) Marta Bastianelli	(France) Roxane Fournier
(Spain) Durango-Durango Emakumeen Saria	April 12	1.2	(United States) Megan Guarnier	(Italy) Elisa Longo Borghini	(Sweden) Emma Johansson
(Netherlands) Salverda Omloop van de IJsseldelta	April 16	1.2	(Netherlands) Anna van der Breggen	(Netherlands) Vera Koedooder	(Netherlands) Floortje Mackaij
(Netherlands) Ronde van Gelderland	April 17	1.2	(Poland) Katarzyna Niewiadoma	(Netherlands) Natalie van Gogh	(Belgium) Lieselot Decroix
(Netherlands) EPZ Omloop van Borsele	April 23	1.1	(Italy) Barbara Guarischi	(Netherlands) Floortje Mackaij	(Luxembourg) Christine Majerus
(Belgium) Dwars door de Westhoek	April 24	1.1	(Luxembourg) Christine Majerus	(Italy) Elena Cecchini	(Sweden) Emma Johansson
(Italy) GP della Liberazione	April 25	1.2	(Italy) Marta Bastianelli	(Australia) Kimberley Wells	(Italy) Arianna Fidanza
(United Kingdom) Tour de Yorkshire	April 30	1.2	(Netherlands) Kirsten Wild	(United Kingdom) Lucy Garner	(Netherlands) Floortje Mackaij
(Russia) Grand Prix of Moscow	May 2	1.2	Cancelled		
(Netherlands) Rabobank Marianne Vos Classic	May 7	1.2	(Netherlands) Marianne Vos	(Australia) Lauren Kitchen	(Netherlands) Anouk Rijff
(Belgium) Trofee Maarten Wynants	May 8	1.2	(Belgium) Lotte Kopecky	(Australia) Lauren Kitchen	(Belgium) Kelly Druyts
(Venezuela) Copa Federación Venezolana de Ciclismo	May 11	1.2	(Brazil) Janildes Fernandes Silva	(Mexico) Íngrid Drexel	(Venezuela) Wilmarys Moreno
(Venezuela) Clasico FVCiclismo Corre Por la VIDA	May 12	1.2	(Venezuela) Danielys Del Valle García	(Mexico) Sofía Arreola	(Ecuador) Miryan Nuñez
Gran Premio de Venezuela	May 14	1.2	(Chile) Paola Muñoz	(Brazil) Clemilda Fernandes	(Venezuela) Jennifer Cesar
Grand Prix de Venezuela	May 15	1.2	(Brazil) Clemilda Fernandes	(Venezuela) Jennifer Cesar	(Mexico) Íngrid Drexel
(United Kingdom) Velothon Wales	May 22	1.2	Cancelled		
(France) La Classique Morbihan	May 27	1.1	(Luxembourg) Christine Majerus	(France) Élise Delzenne	(France) Amélie Rivat
(Netherlands) Boels Rental Hills Classic	May 27	1.1	(United Kingdom) Lizzie Armitstead	(Netherlands) Annemiek van Vleuten	(South Africa) Ashleigh Moolman
(France) Grand Prix de Plumelec-Morbihan Dames	May 28	1.1	(Australia) Rachel Neylan	(Luxembourg) Christine Majerus	(France) Élise Delzenne
(Ukraine) Horizon Park Women Challenge	May 28	1.2	(Ukraine) Tetyana Ryabchenko	(Ukraine) Iryna Semionova	(Ukraine) Hanna Solovey
(Ukraine) VR Women ITT	May 29	1.2	(Ukraine) Valeriya Kononenko	(Ukraine) Tetyana Ryabchenko	(Ukraine) Hanna Solovey
(Belgium) Gooik–Geraardsbergen–Gooik	May 29	1.1	(Australia) Gracie Elvin	(Belgium) Lotte Kopecky	(France) Élise Delzenne
(United States) Winston-Salem Cycling Classic	May 30	1.2	(Italy) Rossella Ratto	(Italy) Valentina Scandolara	(United States) Coryn Rivera
(Canada) Grand Prix Cycliste de Gatineau	June 2	1.1	(Australia) Kimberley Wells	(Canada) Joëlle Numainville	(Canada) Leah Kirchmann
(Canada) Chrono Gatineau	June 3	1.1	(United States) Amber Neben	(Canada) Tara Whitten	(Canada) Karol-Ann Canuel
(Belgium) Zuidkempense Ladies Classic	June 5	1.2	(Netherlands) Marianne Vos	(Australia) Sarah Roy	(Sweden) Sara Mustonen
(Slovenia) Ljubljana–Domžale–Ljubljana TT	June 10	1.2	(Belgium) Ann-Sophie Duyck	(Russia) Olga Zabelinskaya	(United Kingdom) Claire Rose
(Switzerland) Frauen Grand Prix Gippingen	June 12	1.2	Cancelled		
(Belgium) Diamond Tour	June 12	1.1	(Belgium) Jolien D'Hoore	(Luxembourg) Christine Majerus	(Netherlands) Monique van de Ree
(Czech Republic) O cenu hejtmana Moravskoslezskeho kraje TT	June 15	1.2	(Czech Republic) Martina Sáblíková	(Belgium) Ann-Sophie Duyck	(Czech Republic) Nikola Zdráhalová
(Canada) White Spot / Delta Road Race	July 10	1.2	(Canada) Joëlle Numainville	(Canada) Sara Bergen	(Canada) Alison Jackson
(Belgium) Erondegemse Pijl	August 6	1.2	(Netherlands) Lucinda Brand	(Netherlands) Nina Kessler	(Netherlands) Thalita de Jong
(France) Chrono Champenois	September 11	1.1	(Australia) Katrin Garfoot	(Russia) Olga Zabelinskaya	(Netherlands) Ellen van Dijk
(Italy) Giro dell'Emilia Internazionale Donne Elite	September 24	1.1	(Italy) Elisa Longo Borghini	(South Africa) Ashleigh Moolman	(Belarus) Alena Amialiusik
(Italy) Gran Premio Bruno Beghelli Internazionale Donne Elite	September 25	1.1	(Australia) Chloe Hosking	(Netherlands) Marianne Vos	(Italy) Barbara Guarischi
(France) Chrono des Nations	October 23	1.1			
(South Africa) 94.7 Cycle Challenge	November 20	1.1			

† The clock symbol denotes a race which takes the form of a one-day time trial.

== Stage races (2.1 and 2.2) ==
Race	Date	Cat.	Winner	Second	Third
(Argentina) Tour Femenino de San Luis	January 10–15	2.1	(United States) Katie Hall	(Poland) Małgorzata Jasińska	(Cuba) Arlenis Sierra
(Thailand) Tour of Udon	January 15–16	2.2	(Thailand) Jutatip Maneephan	(Taiwan) Ting Ying Huang	(Taiwan) Hsiao Chia Tseng
(Australia) Santos Women's Tour	January 16–19	2.2	(Australia) Katrin Garfoot	(United States) Shelley Olds	(Australia) Lauren Kitchen
Ladies Tour of Qatar	February 2–5	2.1	(Germany) Trixi Worrack	(Germany) Romy Kasper	(Netherlands) Ellen van Dijk
(Mexico) Vuelta Femenil Internacional	April 2–3	2.2	(Mexico) Erika Varela	(Italy) Arianna Fidanza	(Venezuela) Yngrid Porras
(Netherlands) Energiewacht Tour	April 6–10	2.2	(Netherlands) Ellen van Dijk	(Netherlands) Annemiek van Vleuten	(Germany) Lisa Brennauer
(Thailand) The Princess Maha Chackri Sirindhon's Cup	April 8–10	2.2	(Hong Kong) Qianyu Yang	(Taiwan) Ting Ying Huang	(Vietnam) Thi Thi Nguyen
(Spain) Emakumeen Euskal Bira	June 13–17	2.1	(Sweden) Emma Johansson	(United States) Megan Guarnier	(South Africa) Ashleigh Moolman
(United States) Joe Martin Stage Race	April 21–24	2.2	(United States) Coryn Rivera	(New Zealand) Linda Villumsen	(United States) Lauren Stephens
(Czech Republic) Gracia–Orlová	April 28– May 1	2.2	(Azerbaijan) Olena Pavlukhina	(Australia) Shara Gillow	(Belarus) Alena Amialiusik
(Luxembourg) Festival Luxembourgeois du cyclisme féminin Elsy Jacobs	April 29– May 1	2.1	(Poland) Katarzyna Niewiadoma	(Australia) Katrin Garfoot	(Netherlands) Anna van der Breggen
(United States) Tour of the Gila	May 4–8	2.2	(United States) Mara Abbott	(United States) Kristin Armstrong	(Canada) Jasmin Glaesser
Vuelta Internacional Femenina a Costa Rica	May 5–8	2.2	(Cuba) Arlenis Sierra	(Mexico) Íngrid Drexel	(Brazil) Flávia Oliveira
(China) Tour of Zhoushan Island	May 11–13	2.1	(Russia) Elena Kuchinskaya	(Russia) Olga Zabelinskaya	(Switzerland) Nicole Brändli
(Finland) 4. Naisten kv. etappiajo – 4th Women's Stage Race	May 13–15	2.2	(Norway) Vita Heine	(Finland) Sari Saarelainen	(Israel) Shani Bloch
(France) Tour d'Occitanie	May 20–25	2.2	Cancelled		
(Germany) Auensteiner-Radsporttage	June 11–12	2.2	(South Africa) Ashleigh Moolman	(Belgium) Lisa Brennauer	(Netherlands) Annemiek van Vleuten
(Italy) Giro del Trentino Alto Adige-Südtirol	June 18–19	2.1	(Poland) Katarzyna Niewiadoma	(Germany) Claudia Lichtenberg-Häusler	(Italy) Soraya Paladin
(Czech Republic) Tour de Feminin-O cenu Českého Švýcarska	July 7–10	2.2	(Denmark) Cecilie Uttrup Ludwig	(Poland) Anna Plichta	(Russia) Natalia Boyarskaya
(France) Tour de Bretagne Féminin	July 13–17	2.2	(Cuba) Arlenis Sierra	(Belgium) Ann-Sophie Duyck	(United Kingdom) Claire Rose
(Netherlands) BeNe Ladies Tour	July 15–17	2.2	(Belgium) Jolien D'Hoore	(Netherlands) Floortje Mackaij	(France) Élise Delzenne
(Germany) Internationale Thüringen Rundfahrt der Frauen	July 15–21	2.1	(Italy) Elena Cecchini	(Australia) Amanda Spratt	(Netherlands) Ellen van Dijk
(Poland) Tour de Pologne Féminin	July 19–20	2.2	(Switzerland) Jolanda Neff	(Brazil) Flávia Oliveira	(Ukraine) Tetyana Ryabchenko
(United States) Cascade Cycling Classic	July 20–24	2.2	(Canada) Tara Whitten	(United States) Kristin Armstrong	(United States) Carmen Small
La Route de France	August 7–14	2.1	(United States) Amber Neben	(United States) Tayler Wiles	(Poland) Eugenia Bujak
Ladies Tour of Norway	August 12–14	2.1	(Netherlands) Lucinda Brand	(Netherlands) Thalita de Jong	(Netherlands) Anouska Koster
(France) Trophée d'Or Féminin	August 21–24	2.2	(France) Élise Delzenne	(Germany) Claudia Lichtenberg	(Lithuania) Daiva Tušlaitė
(Netherlands) Boels Rental Ladies Tour	August 30–September 4	2.1	(Netherlands) Chantal Blaak	(Netherlands) Ellen van Dijk	(Belarus) Alena Amialiusik
(France) Tour Cycliste Féminin International de l'Ardèche	September 1	2.2	(Brazil) Flávia Oliveira	(Austria) Anna Kiesenhofer	(France) Edwige Pitel
Lotto Belisol Belgium Tour	September 6–9	2.1	(Netherlands) Annemiek van Vleuten	(Netherlands) Marianne Vos	(Netherlands) Lucinda Brand
(Italy) Premondiale Giro Toscana Int. Femminile – Memorial Michela Fanini	September 9–11	2.2	(South Africa) Ashleigh Moolman	(Brazil) Flávia Oliveira	(Italy) Anna Zita Maria Stricker

== Championships ==
=== International Games ===
Championships	Race	Winner	Second	Third
South Asian Games	Road race	(India) Tourangbam Bidyaluxmi	(India) Menamparambil Lidiyamol Sunny	(India) N. Geethuraj
South Asian Games	Individual Time Trial	(India) Tourangbam Bidyaluxmi	(India) Elangbam Chaobi Devi	(Pakistan) Sabiha Bibi
South Asian Games	Criterium	(India) Menamparambil Lidiyamol Sunny	(India) Tongbram Manorama Devi	(Sri Lanka) Sudarika Priyadarshani Peththaperuma Arachchige
South Asian Games	Team Time Trial	India	Pakistan	Sri Lanka
Olympic Games	Road race	(Netherlands) Anna van der Breggen	(Sweden) Emma Johansson	(Italy) Elisa Longo Borghini
Olympic Games	Individual Time Trial	(United States) Kristin Armstrong	(Russia) Olga Zabelinskaya	(Netherlands) Anna van der Breggen

=== Continental Championships ===
Championships	Race	Winner	Second	Third
African Continental Championships; Morocco	Road race	(Namibia) Vera Adrian	(South Africa) An-Li Kachelhoffer	(Mauritius) Kimberly Le Court de Billot
African Continental Championships; Morocco	Individual time trial	(Namibia) Vera Adrian	(Rwanda) Jeanne D'arc Girubuntu	(South Africa) Samantha Sanders
African Continental Championships; Morocco	Team time trial	South Africa	Ethiopia	Eritrea
Oceania Cycling Championships; Australia	Road race	(Australia) Shannon Malseed	(Australia) Jessica Mundy	(Australia) Lisen Hockings
Oceania Cycling Championships; Australia	Individual time trial	(Australia) Katrin Garfoot	(Australia) Bridie O'Donnell	(Australia) Kate Perry
Pan American Championships; Venezuela	Road race	(Cuba) Iraida Garcia	(Cuba) Arlenis Sierra	(Brazil) Flávia Oliveira
Pan American Championships; Venezuela	Individual time trial	(Colombia) Sérika Gulumá	(Colombia) Ana Sanabria	(Mexico) Íngrid Drexel
Asian Cycling Championships; Japan (2016 summary)	Road race	(South Korea) Ahreum Na	(China) Yixian Pu	(Japan) Mayuko Hagiwara
Asian Cycling Championships; Japan (2016 summary)	Individual time trial	(Japan) Mayuko Hagiwara	(South Korea) Ju Mi Lee	(Hong Kong) Yao Pang
European Road Championships; France (2016 summary)	Road race	(Netherlands) Anna van der Breggen	(Poland) Katarzyna Niewiadoma	(Italy) Elisa Longo Borghini
European Road Championships; France (2016 summary)	Individual time trial	(Netherlands) Ellen van Dijk	(Netherlands) Anna van der Breggen	(Russia) Olga Zabelinskaya
European Road Championships; France (2016 summary)	Road race (U23)	(Poland) Katarzyna Niewiadoma	(Denmark) Cecilie Uttrup Ludwig	(France) Séverine Eraud
European Road Championships; France (2016 summary)	Individual time trial (U23)	(Russia) Anastasiia Iakovenko	(Belarus) Ksenyia Tuhai	(Germany) Lisa Klein

== UCI teams ==
The country designation of each team is determined by the country of registration of the largest number of its riders, and is not necessarily the country where the team is registered or based.
