= 2016 The Women's Tour =

Cycling race

2016 UCI Women's World Tour, race 10 of 17
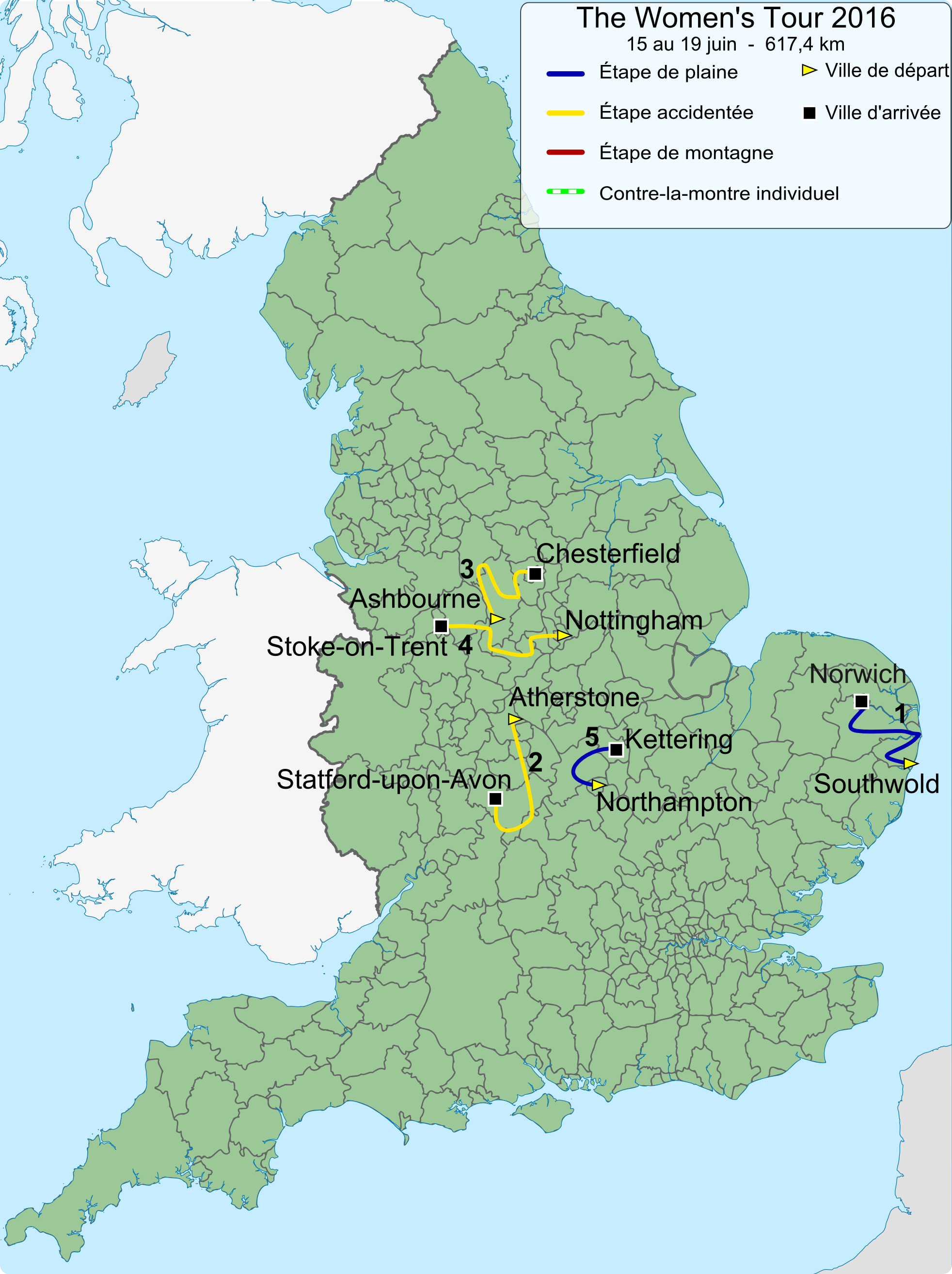

Race details
- Dates: 15 – 19 June 2016
- Stages: 5
- Distance: 617.4 km (383.6 mi)
- Winning time: 16h 00' 39"

Results
Jersey awarded to the overall winner	Winner	Lizzie Armitstead (GBR)	(Boels–Dolmans)
	Second	Ashleigh Moolman-Pasio (RSA)	(Cervélo–Bigla Pro Cycling)
	Third	Elisa Longo Borghini (ITA)	(Wiggle High5)
Jersey awarded to the points classification winner	Points	Marianne Vos (NED)	(Rabobank-Liv Woman Cycling Team)
Jersey awarded to the mountains classification winner	Mountains	Katie Hall (USA)	(UnitedHealthcare)
Jersey awarded to the youth classification winner	Youth	Floortje Mackaij (NED)	(Team Liv–Plantur)
	Team	Wiggle High5	

The 2016 Aviva Women's Tour was the third staging of The Women's Tour, a women's stage race held in the United Kingdom. It took place between 15 and 19 June 2016. The race was part of the UCI Women's World Tour, the premier annual female elite road cycling tour.

The race was won by reigning World Champion Lizzie Armitstead. The 2015 champion, Lisa Brennauer, withdrew on the last stage, while 2014 champion Marianne Vos won the points category and finished fourth overall.

== Schedule ==
List of stages
Stage	Date	Course	Distance	Winner
1	15 June	Southwold – Norwich	132.0 km (82.0 mi)	Christine Majerus (LUX)
2	16 June	Atherstone – Stratford-upon-Avon	140.0 km (87.0 mi)	Amy Pieters (NED)
3	17 June	Ashbourne – Chesterfield	112.6 km (70.0 mi)	Lizzie Armitstead (GBR)
4	18 June	Nottingham – Stoke-on-Trent	119.6 km (74.3 mi)	Marianne Vos (NED)
5	19 June	Northampton – Kettering	113.2 km (70.3 mi)	Lotta Lepistö (FIN)
Total			617.4 km (383.6 mi)	

== Results ==
=== Stage 1 ===
15 June 2016 – Southwold – Norwich, 132.0 km (82.0 mi)

Stage 1 Result

Rank	Rider	Team	Time
1	Christine Majerus (LUX)	Boels–Dolmans	3h 24' 48"
2	Marianne Vos (NED)	Rabobank-Liv Woman Cycling Team	+ 0"
3	Giorgia Bronzini (ITA)	Wiggle High5	+ 0"
4	Marta Bastianelli (ITA)	Alé–Cipollini	+ 0"
5	Lotta Lepistö (FIN)	Cervélo–Bigla Pro Cycling	+ 0"
6	Leah Kirchman (CAN)	Team Liv–Plantur	+ 0"
7	Lucinda Brand (NED)	Rabobank-Liv Woman Cycling Team	+ 0"
8	Alison Tetrick (USA)	Cylance Pro Cycling	+ 0"
9	Elisa Longo Borghini (ITA)	Wiggle High5	+ 0"
10	Floortje Mackaij (NED)	Team Liv–Plantur	+ 0"

General Classification after Stage 1

Rank	Rider	Team	Time
1	Christine Majerus (LUX)	Boels–Dolmans	3h 24' 38"
2	Marianne Vos (NED)	Rabobank-Liv Woman Cycling Team	+ 1"
3	Giorgia Bronzini (ITA)	Wiggle High5	+ 6"
4	Leah Kirchman (CAN)	Team Liv–Plantur	+ 7"
5	Gracie Elvin (AUS)	Orica–AIS	+ 7"
6	Chantal Blaak (NED)	Boels–Dolmans	+ 8"
7	Lizzie Armitstead (GBR)	Boels–Dolmans	+ 9"
8	Marta Bastianelli (ITA)	Alé–Cipollini	+ 10"
9	Lotta Lepistö (FIN)	Cervélo–Bigla Pro Cycling	+ 10"
10	Lucinda Brand (NED)	Rabobank-Liv Woman Cycling Team	+ 10"

=== Stage 2 ===
16 June 2016 – Atherstone – Stratford-upon-Avon, 140.0 km (87.0 mi)

Stage 2 Result

Rank	Rider	Team	Time
1	Amy Pieters (NED)	Wiggle High5	3h 36' 55"
2	Lisa Brennauer (GER)	Canyon//SRAM	+ 0"
3	Marianne Vos (NED)	Rabobank-Liv Woman Cycling Team	+ 0"
4	Gracie Elvin (AUS)	Orica–AIS	+ 0"
5	Christine Majerus (LUX)	Boels–Dolmans	+ 0"
6	Emma Johansson (SWE)	Wiggle High5	+ 0"
7	Giorgia Bronzini (ITA)	Wiggle High5	+ 0"
8	Floortje Mackaij (NED)	Team Liv–Plantur	+ 0"
9	Leah Kirchmann (CAN)	Team Liv–Plantur	+ 0"
10	Anna van der Breggen (NED)	Rabobank-Liv Woman Cycling Team	+ 0"

General Classification after Stage 2

Rank	Rider	Team	Time
1	Marianne Vos (NED)	Rabobank-Liv Woman Cycling Team	7h 01' 26"
2	Christine Majerus (LUX)	Boels–Dolmans	+ 3"
3	Amy Pieters (NED)	Wiggle High5	+ 7"
4	Lisa Brennauer (GER)	Canyon//SRAM	+ 11"
5	Giorgia Bronzini (ITA)	Wiggle High5	+ 13"
6	Leah Kirchmann (CAN)	Team Liv–Plantur	+ 13"
7	Gracie Elvin (AUS)	Orica–AIS	+ 14"
8	Lizzie Armitstead (GBR)	Boels–Dolmans	+ 16"
9	Floortje Mackaij (NED)	Team Liv–Plantur	+ 17"
10	Emma Johansson (SWE)	Wiggle High5	+ 17"

=== Stage 3 ===
17 June 2016 – Ashbourne – Chesterfield, 112.6 km (70.0 mi)

Stage 3 Result

Rank	Rider	Team	Time
1	Lizzie Armitstead (GBR)	Boels–Dolmans	2h 54' 27"
2	Ashleigh Moolman-Pasio (RSA)	Cervélo–Bigla Pro Cycling	+ 0"
3	Elisa Longo Borghini (ITA)	Wiggle High5	+ 0"
4	Amanda Spratt (AUS)	Orica–AIS	+ 3"
5	Marianne Vos (NED)	Rabobank-Liv Woman Cycling Team	+ 36"
6	Amalie Dideriksen (DEN)	Boels–Dolmans	+ 36"
7	Leah Kirchmann (CAN)	Team Liv–Plantur	+ 36"
8	Giorgia Bronzini (ITA)	Wiggle High5	+ 36"
9	Lisa Brennauer (GER)	Canyon//SRAM	+ 36"
10	Amy Pieters (NED)	Wiggle High5	+ 36"

General Classification after Stage 3

Rank	Rider	Team	Time
1	Lizzie Armitstead (GBR)	Boels–Dolmans	9h 55' 59"
2	Ashleigh Moolman-Pasio (RSA)	Cervélo–Bigla Pro Cycling	+ 5"
3	Elisa Longo Borghini (ITA)	Wiggle High5	+ 7"
4	Amanda Spratt (AUS)	Orica–AIS	+ 14"
5	Marianne Vos (NED)	Rabobank-Liv Woman Cycling Team	+ 27"
6	Christine Majerus (LUX)	Boels–Dolmans	+ 32"
7	Amy Pieters (NED)	Wiggle High5	+ 37"
8	Leah Kirchmann (CAN)	Team Liv–Plantur	+ 41"
9	Lisa Brennauer (GER)	Canyon//SRAM	+ 41"
10	Giorgia Bronzini (ITA)	Wiggle High5	+ 43"

=== Stage 4 ===
18 June 2016 – Nottingham – Stoke-on-Trent, 119.6 km (74.3 mi)

Stage 4 Result

Rank	Rider	Team	Time
1	Marianne Vos (NED)	Rabobank-Liv Woman Cycling Team	3h 07' 00"
2	Leah Kirchmann (CAN)	Team Liv–Plantur	+ 0"
3	Emma Johansson (SWE)	Wiggle High5	+ 0"
4	Amalie Dideriksen (DEN)	Boels–Dolmans	+ 0"
5	Lisa Brennauer (GER)	Canyon//SRAM	+ 0"
6	Lizzie Armitstead (GBR)	Boels–Dolmans	+ 0"
7	Amy Pieters (NED)	Wiggle High5	+ 0"
8	Ashleigh Moolman-Pasio (RSA)	Cervélo–Bigla Pro Cycling	+ 0"
9	Nikki Harris (GBR)	Boels–Dolmans	+ 0"
10	Ellen van Dijk (NED)	Boels–Dolmans	+ 0"

General Classification after Stage 4

Rank	Rider	Team	Time
1	Lizzie Armitstead (GBR)	Boels–Dolmans	13h 02' 56"
2	Ashleigh Moolman-Pasio (RSA)	Cervélo–Bigla Pro Cycling	+ 8"
3	Elisa Longo Borghini (ITA)	Wiggle High5	+ 10"
4	Marianne Vos (NED)	Rabobank-Liv Woman Cycling Team	+ 15"
5	Amanda Spratt (AUS)	Orica–AIS	+ 17"
6	Leah Kirchmann (CAN)	Team Liv–Plantur	+ 37"
7	Amy Pieters (NED)	Wiggle High5	+ 40"
8	Lisa Brennauer (GER)	Canyon//SRAM	+ 44"
9	Emma Johansson (SWE)	Wiggle High5	+ 46"
10	Gracie Elvin (AUS)	Orica–AIS	+ 47"

=== Stage 5 ===
19 June 2016 – Northampton – Kettering, 113.2 km (70.3 mi)

Stage 5 Result

Rank	Rider	Team	Time
1	Lotta Lepistö (FIN)	Cervélo–Bigla Pro Cycling	2h 57' 31"
2	Marta Bastianelli (ITA)	Alé–Cipollini	+ 0"
3	Elena Cecchini (ITA)	Canyon//SRAM	+ 0"
4	Lauren Kitchen (AUS)	Team Hitec Products	+ 0"
5	Eugenia Bujak (POL)	BTC City Ljubljana	+ 0"
6	Molly Weaver (GBR)	Team Liv–Plantur	+ 0"
7	Janneke Ensing (NED)	Parkhotel Valkenburg Continental Team	+ 11"
8	Leah Kirchmann (CAN)	Team Liv–Plantur	+ 15"
9	Jolien D'Hoore (BEL)	Wiggle High5	+ 15"
10	Marianne Vos (NED)	Rabobank-Liv Woman Cycling Team	+ 15"

General Classification after Stage 5

Rank	Rider	Team	Time
1	Lizzie Armitstead (GBR)	Boels–Dolmans	16h 00' 39"
2	Ashleigh Moolman-Pasio (RSA)	Cervélo–Bigla Pro Cycling	+ 11"
3	Elisa Longo Borghini (ITA)	Wiggle High5	+ 13"
4	Marianne Vos (NED)	Rabobank-Liv Woman Cycling Team	+ 18"
5	Amanda Spratt (AUS)	Orica–AIS	+ 20"
6	Leah Kirchmann (CAN)	Team Liv–Plantur	+ 40"
7	Amy Pieters (NED)	Wiggle High5	+ 43"
8	Emma Johansson (SWE)	Wiggle High5	+ 49"
9	Gracie Elvin (AUS)	Orica–AIS	+ 50"
10	Floortje Mackaij (NED)	Team Liv–Plantur	+ 53"

== Classification leadership ==
Classification leadership by stage
Stage	Winner	General classification	Young rider classification	Mountains classification	Points classification	Best British rider classification	Combativity award	Team classification
1	Christine Majerus	Christine Majerus	Floortje Mackaij	Ilona Hoeksma	Christine Majerus	Lizzie Armitstead	Alison Tetrick	Liv Racing TeqFind
2	Amy Pieters	Marianne Vos	Floortje Mackaij	Katie Hall	Marianne Vos	Lizzie Armitstead	Emilia Fahlin	Wiggle High5
3	Lizzie Armitstead	Lizzie Armitstead	Floortje Mackaij	Katie Hall	Marianne Vos	Lizzie Armitstead	Ashleigh Moolman-Pasio	Wiggle High5
4	Marianne Vos	Lizzie Armitstead	Floortje Mackaij	Katie Hall	Marianne Vos	Lizzie Armitstead	Emilia Fahlin	Wiggle High5
5	Lotta Lepistö	Lizzie Armitstead	Floortje Mackaij	Katie Hall	Marianne Vos	Lizzie Armitstead	Eugenia Bujak	Wiggle High5
Final		Lizzie Armitstead	Floortje Mackaij	Katie Hall	Marianne Vos	Lizzie Armitstead	Emilia Fahlin	Wiggle High5
