= 2016 Gent–Wevelgem (women's race) =

2016 UCI Women's World Tour, race 4 of 17
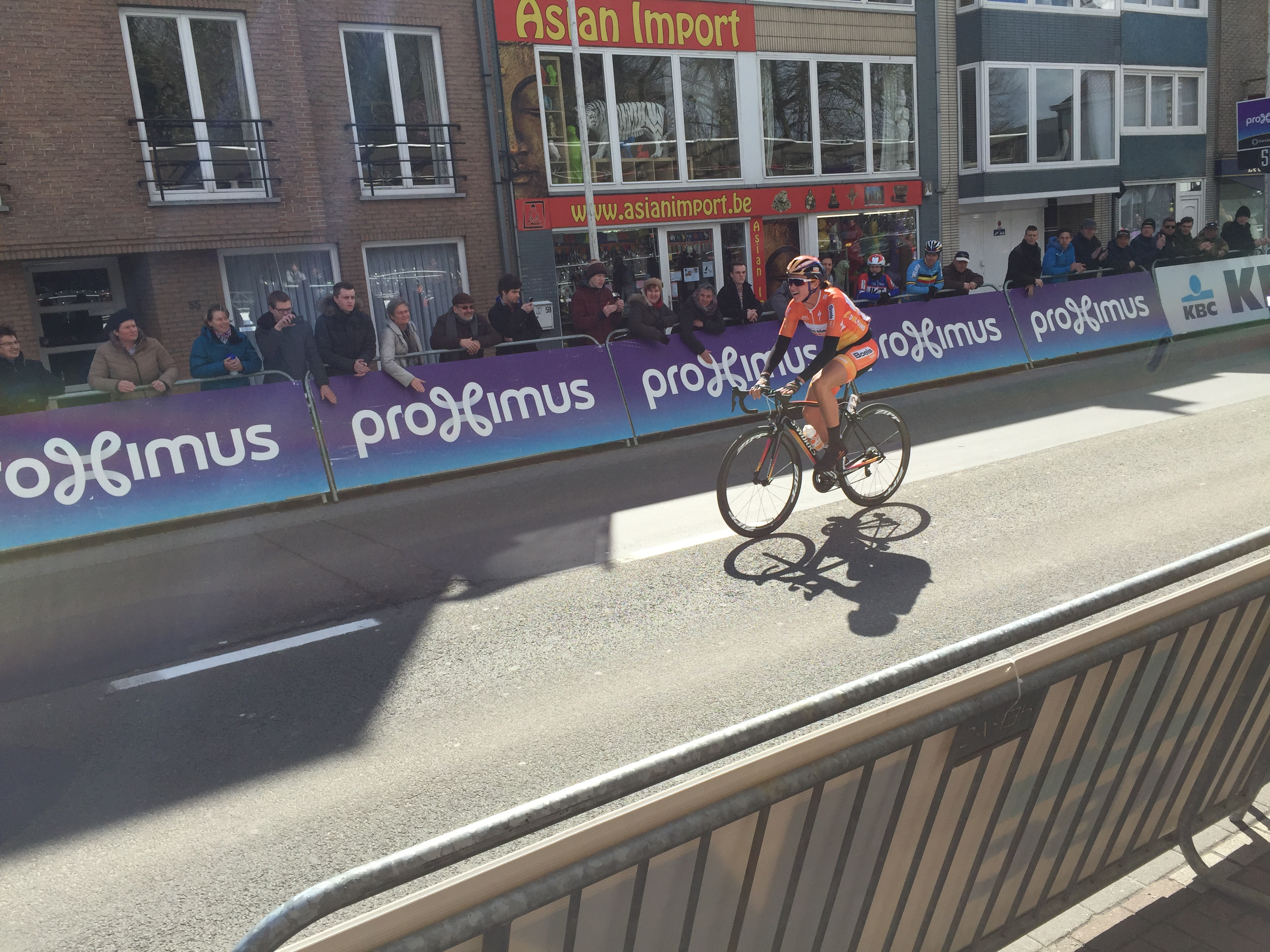
- Chantal Blaak winning the race

Race details
- Dates: 27 March 2016
- Stages: 1
- Distance: 115 km (71 mi)
- Winning time: 2h 56' 00"

Results
	Winner	Chantal Blaak (NED)	(Boels–Dolmans)
	Second	Lisa Brennauer (GER)	(Canyon//SRAM)
	Third	Lucinda Brand (NED)	(Rabobank-Liv Woman Cycling Team)

The fifth edition of the Gent–Wevelgem women's race (also known as Gent-Wevelgem In Flanders Fields) was held on 27 March 2016. It was a one-day road women's cycling race in Belgium. It was included in the inaugural Women's World Tour, coming as the fourth round of the competition. Dutch rider Chantal Blaak won the race after a solo attack.

== Route ==
=== Kemmelberg ===
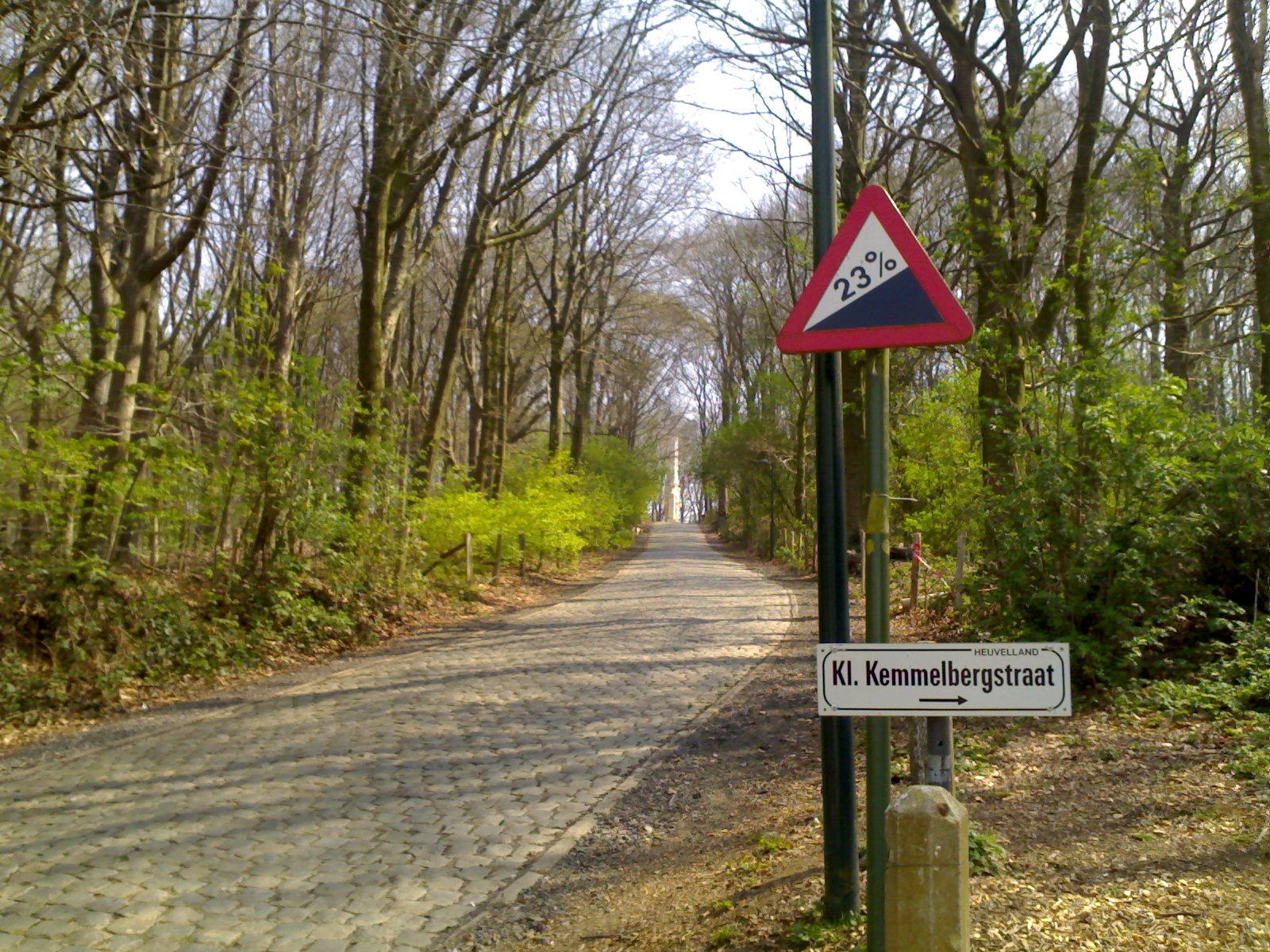
The Kemmelberg was addressed by its toughest road, with slopes up to 23% gradient.

The Kemmelberg is the emotional centrepiece of the race. This edition, the second ascent of the Kemmelberg was addressed via its steepest road. The first ascent was via the traditional route with a maximum gradient of 17%, but the second was addressed via this steeper road, which has a maximum gradient of 23% near the top. (Note: The cyclingnews link states that the traditional ascent of Kemmelberg has a 17% average gradient over less than half a kilometer, but in fact, that is its maximum) Race director Hans De Clercq stated that it is a tribute to the historical significance of the Kemmelberg, as it is that road being used the first time the Kemmelberg was included in the men's race, in 1955. According to COTACOL, a Belgian standard work that has examined and graded every climb in the country, the "new" Kemmelberg ascent is the toughest climb in all Flemish races. They have given it an overall score of 183 points, which is more than the Koppenberg, the Muur van Geraardsbergen or the traditional Kemmelberg road.

== Results ==
Result
Rank	Rider	Team	Time
1	Chantal Blaak (NED)	Boels–Dolmans	2h 56' 00"
2	Lisa Brennauer (GER)	Canyon//SRAM	+ 1' 24"
3	Lucinda Brand (NED)	Rabobank-Liv Woman Cycling Team	+ 1' 24"
4	Amy Pieters (NED)	Wiggle High5	+ 1' 24"
5	Carmen Small (USA)	Cervélo–Bigla Pro Cycling	+ 1' 24"
6	Annemiek van Vleuten (NED)	Orica–AIS	+ 1' 24"
7	Leah Kirchmann (CAN)	Team Liv–Plantur	+ 1' 24"
8	Ellen van Dijk (NED)	Boels–Dolmans	+ 1' 24"
9	Emma Johansson (SWE)	Wiggle High5	+ 1' 27"
10	Romy Kasper (GER)	Boels–Dolmans	+ 1' 32"

== Gallery ==
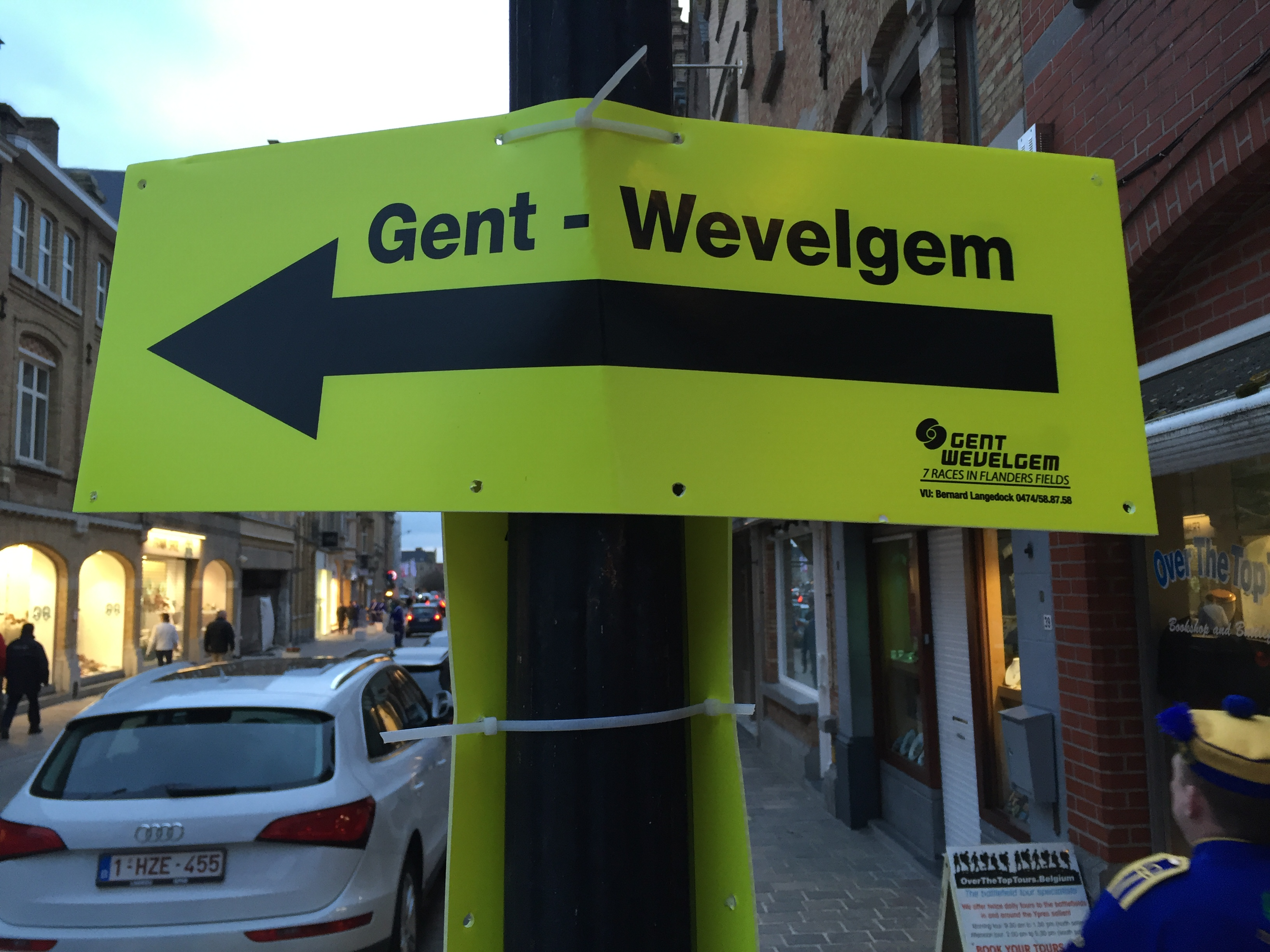
Sign of the race

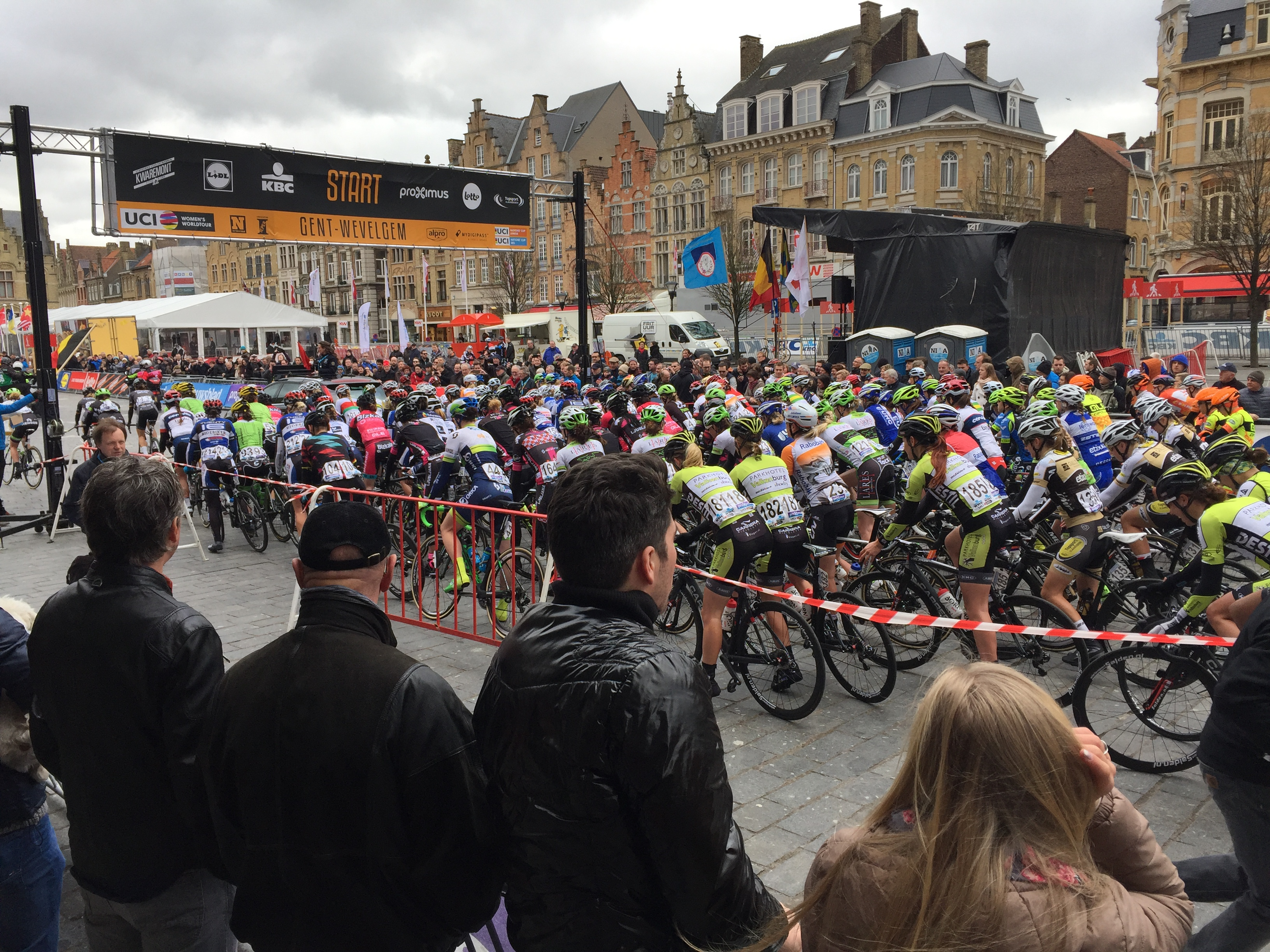
0 km: The start of the race

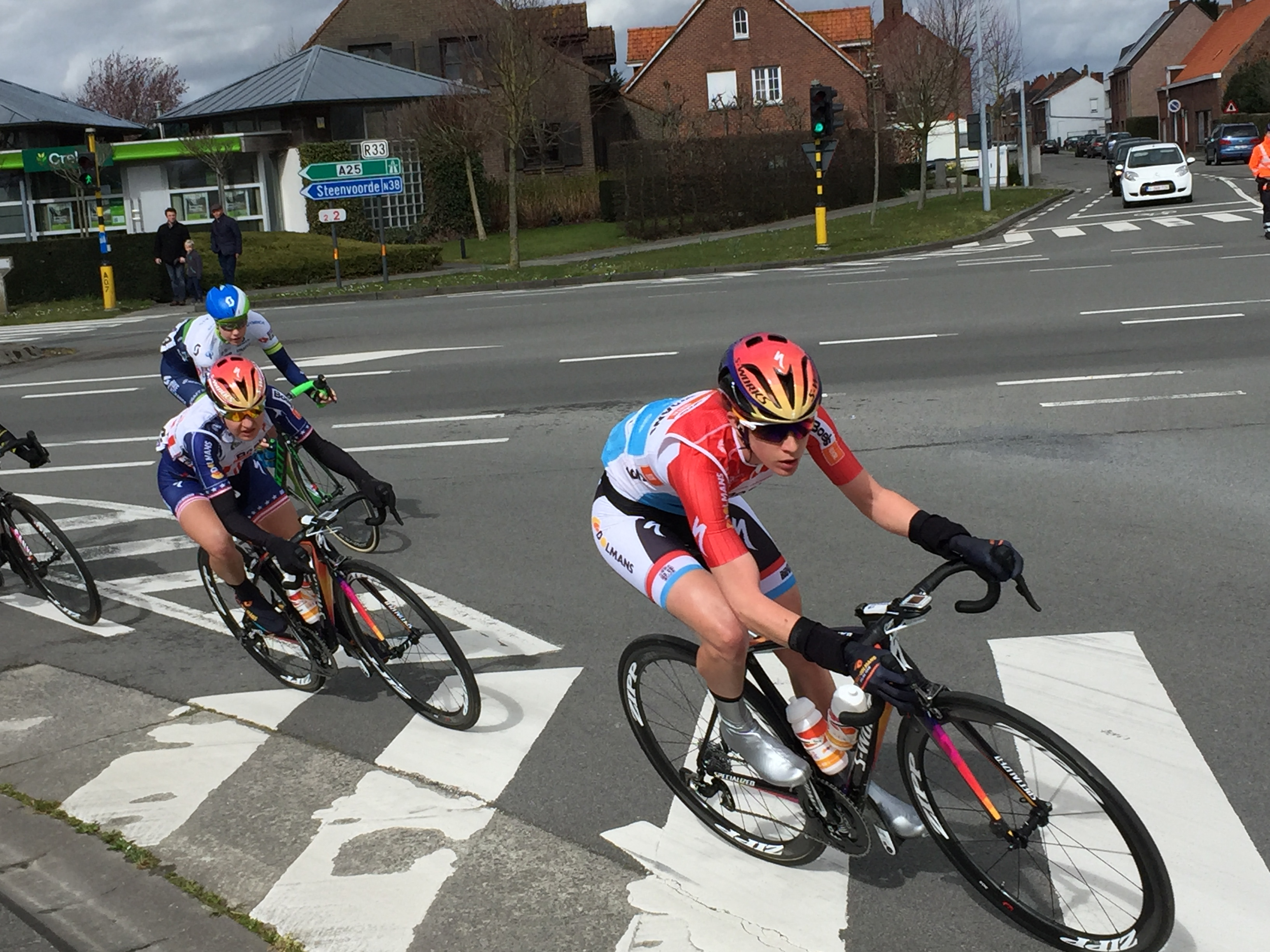
38 km: Front of the peloton

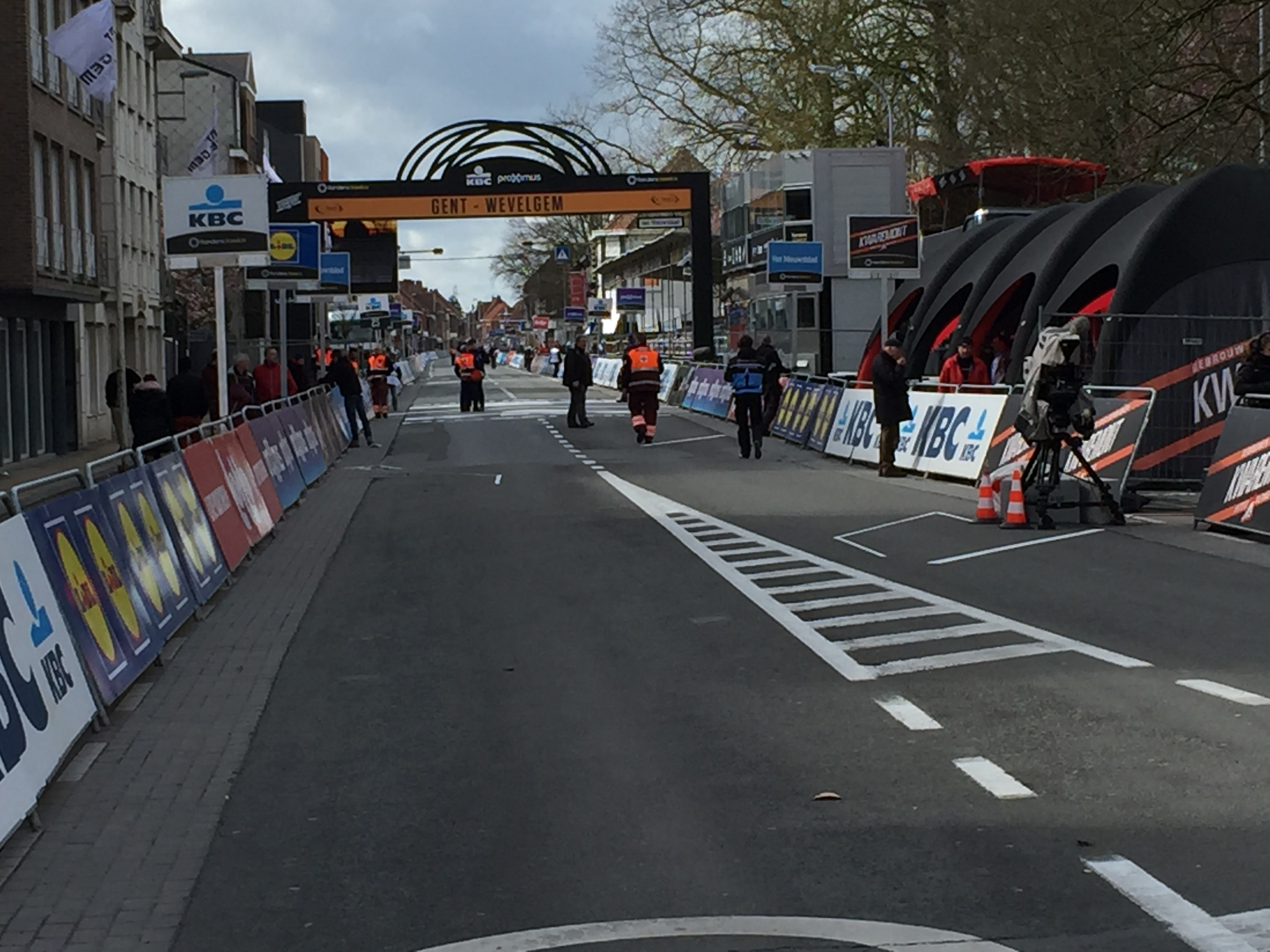
Finish: The finish line

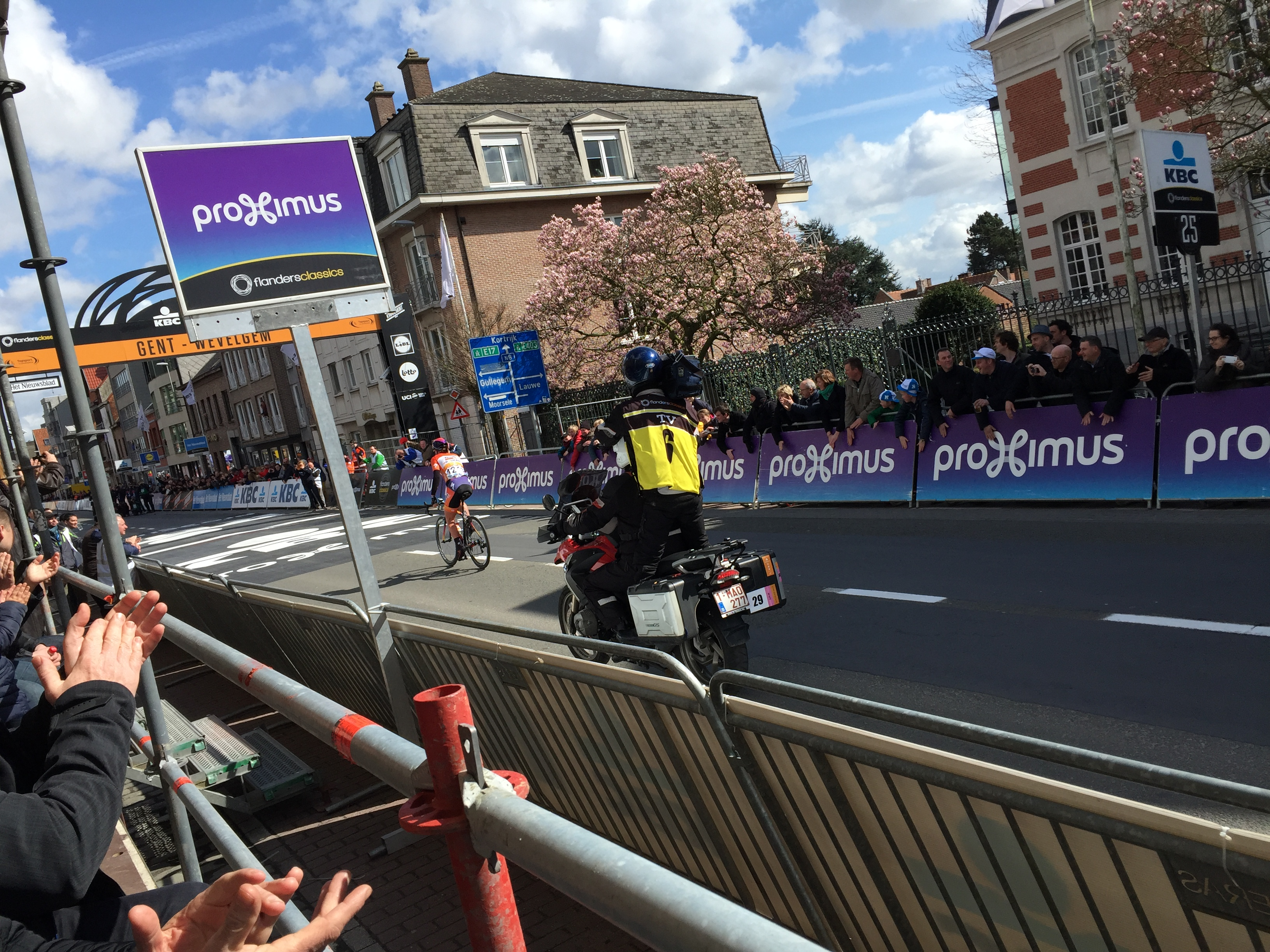
Finish: Chantal Blaak wins

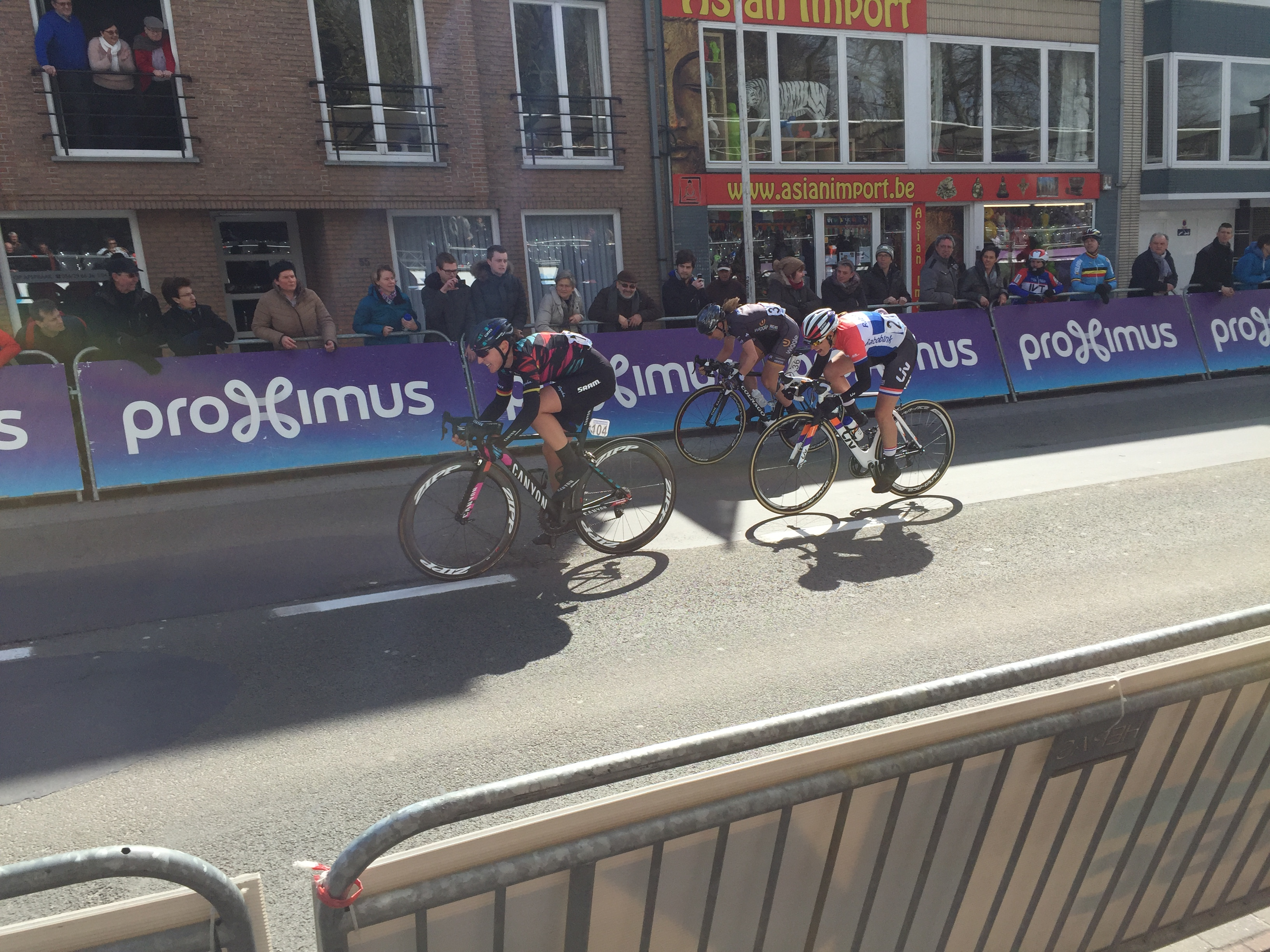
Finish: Sprint for 2nd place onwards

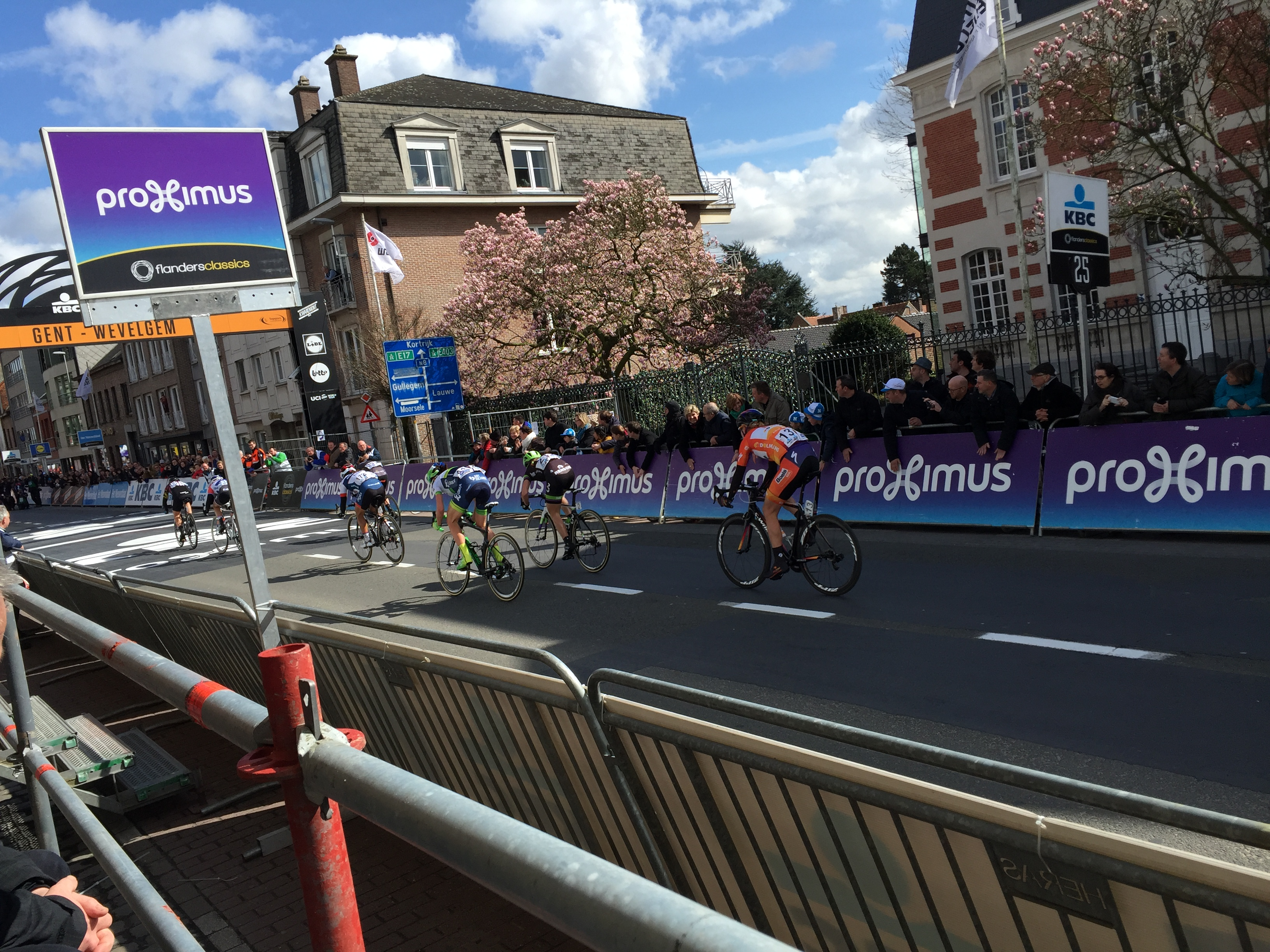
Finish: Sprint for 2nd place onwards

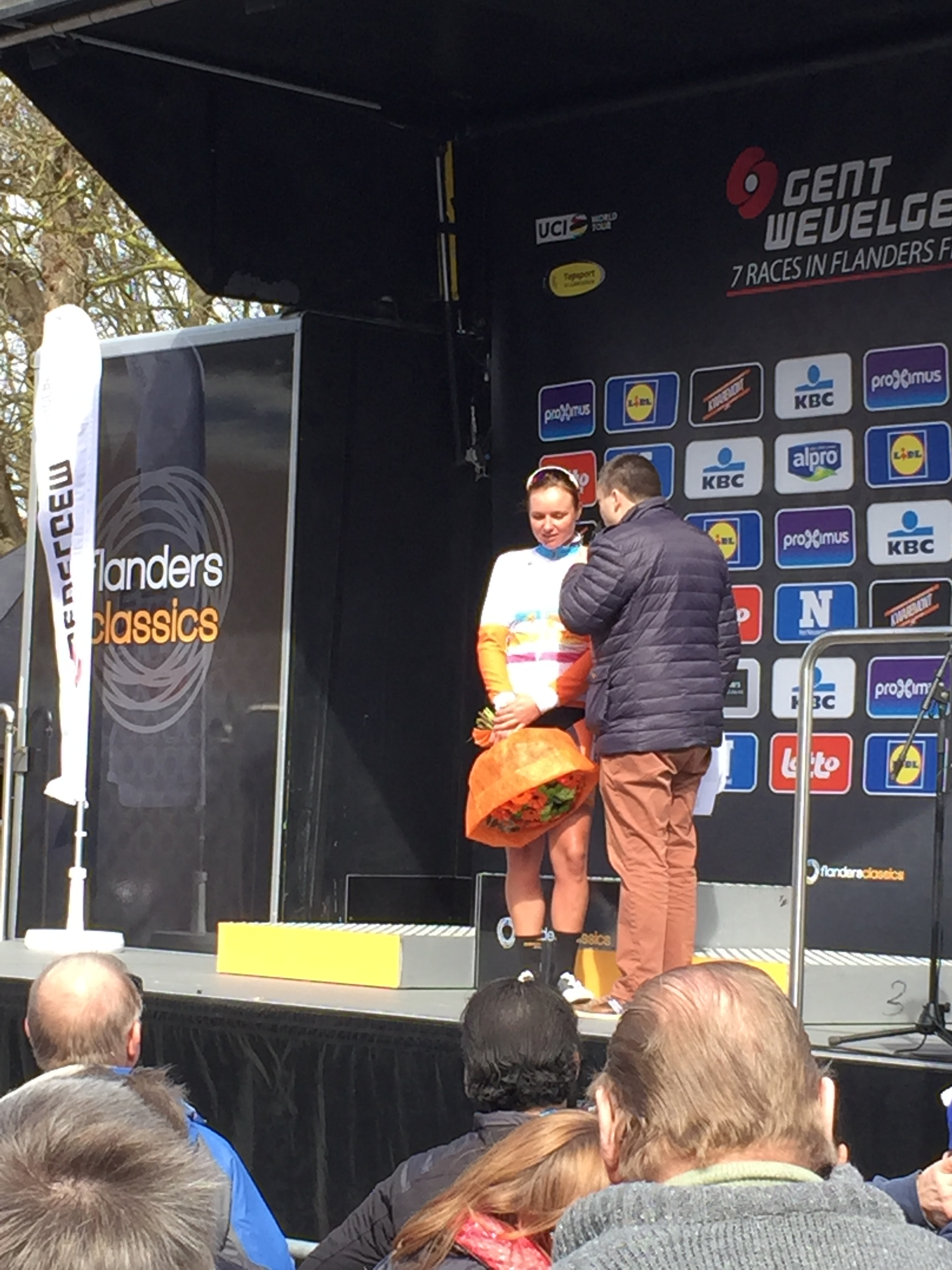
Podium: Chantal Blaak on the podium

== See also ==
- 2016 in women's road cycling
