= 2016 La Course by Le Tour de France =

2016 UCI Women's World Tour, race 12 of 17
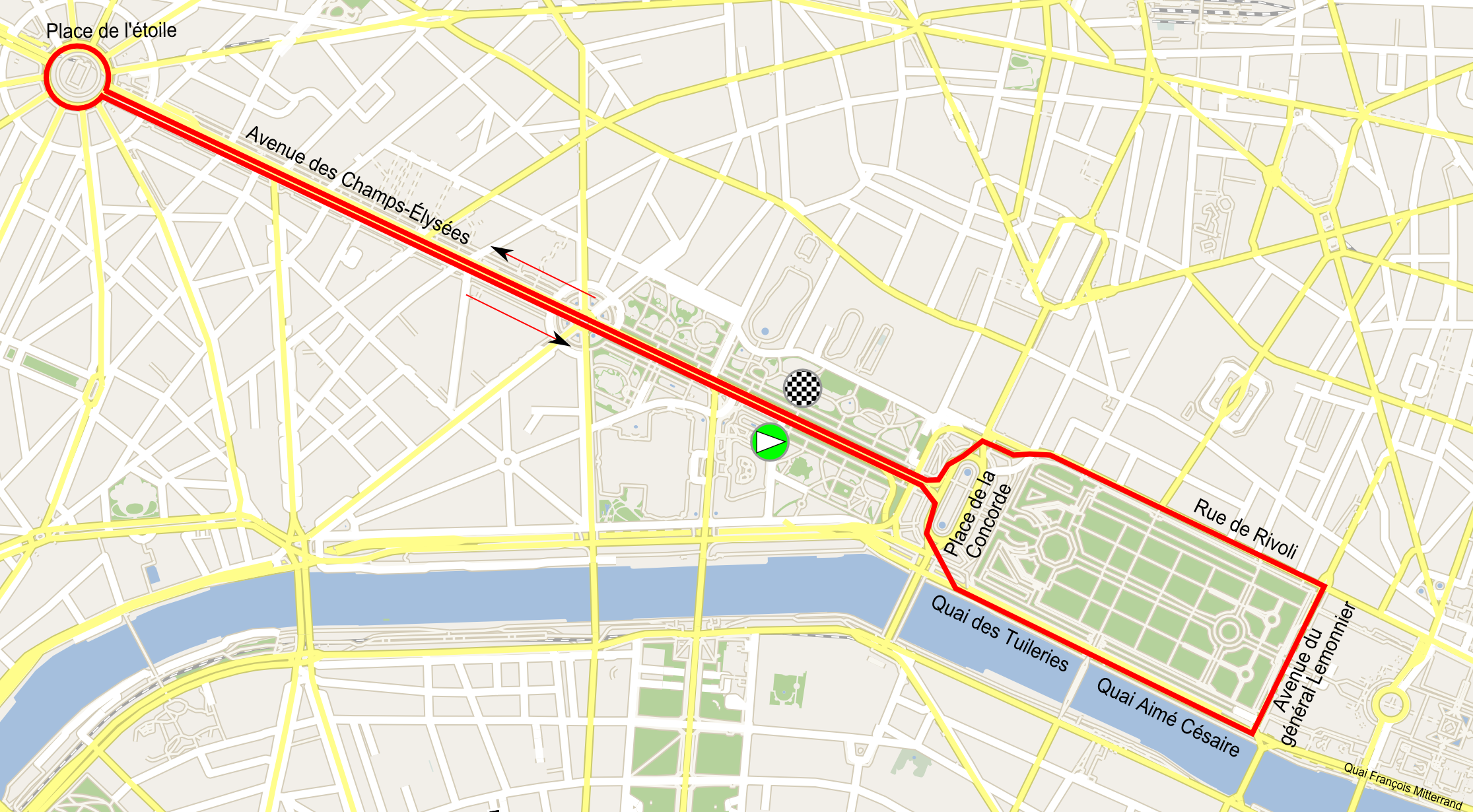

Race details
- Dates: 24 July 2016
- Stages: 1
- Distance: 89.0 km (55.3 mi)

Results
	Winner	Chloe Hosking (AUS)	(Wiggle High5)
	Second	Lotta Lepistö (FIN)	(Cervélo–Bigla Pro Cycling)
	Third	Marianne Vos (NED)	(Rabobank-Liv Woman Cycling Team)
Jersey awarded to the points classification winner	Points	Nina Kessler (NED)	(Lensworld–Zannata)

The 2016 La Course by Le Tour de France was the third edition of La Course by Le Tour de France, a women's cycling race held in France. The race was held before the final stage of the 2016 Tour de France on 24 July, and was the twelfth event on the 2016 UCI Women's World Tour. The event was organised by ASO, which also organises the Tour de France.

It was won by Chloe Hosking of Wiggle High5 in a sprint finish.

== Route ==
As with the two previous editions of the race, the course was 13 laps of the traditional course on the Champs-Élysées in Paris - making a distance of 89 kilometres (55 miles).

== Teams ==
UCI Women's Teams

- Alé–Cipollini–Galassia
- Astana Women's Team
- Bepink
- Boels–Dolmans
- BTC City Ljubljana
- Canyon–SRAM
- Cervélo–Bigla Pro Cycling
- Cylance Pro Cycling
- Lensworld.eu–Zannata
- Lotto–Soudal Ladies
- Orica–AIS
- Parkhotel Valkenburg Continental Team
- Poitou–Charentes.Futuroscope.86
- Rabobank-Liv Woman Cycling Team
- Team Hitec Products
- Team Liv–Plantur
- Tibco–Silicon Valley Bank
- Topsport Vlaanderen–Pro-Duo
- UnitedHealthcare Women's Team
- Wiggle High5 Pro Cycling

National Teams

- France

== Result ==
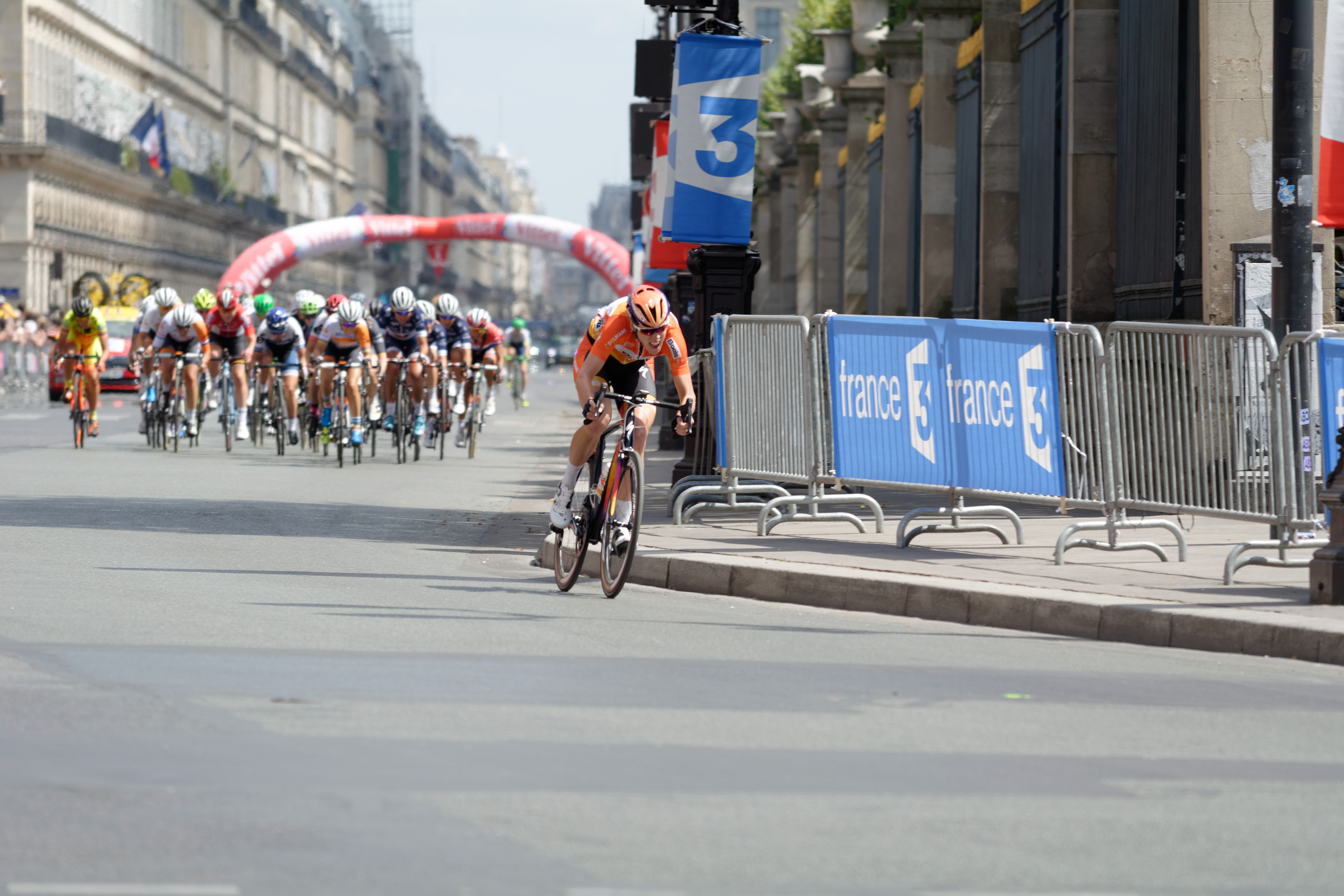
Ellen van Dijk escaped solo during the race

Race result

	Cyclist	Team	Time
1	Chloe Hosking (AUS)	Wiggle High5	2h 01' 27"
2	Lotta Lepistö (FIN)	Cervélo–Bigla Pro Cycling	+ 0"
3	Marianne Vos (NED)	Rabobank-Liv Woman Cycling Team	+ 0"
4	Joëlle Numainville (CAN)	Cervélo–Bigla Pro Cycling	+ 0"
5	Roxane Fournier (FRA)	Poitou-Charentes.Futuroscope.86	+ 0"
6	Pascale Jeuland (FRA)	Poitou-Charentes.Futuroscope.86	+ 0"
7	Tiffany Cromwell (AUS)	Canyon//SRAM	+ 0"
8	Joanne Kiesanowski (NZL)	Tibco–Silicon Valley Bank	+ 0"
9	Lotte Kopecky (BEL)	Lotto–Soudal Ladies	+ 0"
10	Maria Giulia Confalonieri (ITA)	Lensworld–Zannata	+ 0"

== See also ==
- 2016 in women's road cycling
