= 2016 UCI Women's World Tour =

- First edition of the UCI Women's WorldTour

Details
- Dates: 5 March – 11 September
- Location: Europe, USA and China
- Races: 17

Champions
- Individual champion: Megan Guarnier (Boels–Dolmans)
- Teams' champion: Boels–Dolmans

The 2016 UCI Women's World Tour was the first edition of the UCI Women's World Tour. It featured nine one-day races of the former UCI Women's Road World Cup, plus another four one-day races. However, unlike its predecessor, the World Tour also incorporated four stage races, in China, the United States, the United Kingdom and Italy respectively.

The individual classification was won by American rider Megan Guarnier, riding for the Boels–Dolmans team. Guarnier took the lead of the standings after winning the Tour of California, maintaining it for the remainder of the year, adding further race victories at the Philadelphia Cycling Classic, and the Giro d'Italia Femminile. Her closest competitor, Canada's Leah Kirchmann (Team Liv–Plantur) finished over 300 points in arrears in second place. Third place in the standings went to the defending world champion Lizzie Armitstead of Great Britain, also riding for Boels–Dolmans. Armitstead took four victories – the most by any rider in 2016 – including a win in her home race, the Women's Tour.

In the other classifications, Rabobank-Liv Woman Cycling Team rider Katarzyna Niewiadoma from Poland was the winner of the youth classification for riders under the age of 23. Niewiadoma took six victories in the classification, and finished with twice the number of points as compared to her nearest challenger, Dutch rider Floortje Mackaij of Team Liv–Plantur. Boels–Dolmans were the winners of the teams classification, taking ten wins out of a possible seventeen, including the opening five races of the season. Wiggle High5 took three victories with Chloe Hosking taking a pair of victories and Jolien D'Hoore winning the final race, as they finished as runners-up in the standings.

== Events ==
The World Tour featured 17 events, with 4 stage races, 12 one-day races and a team time trial event. Sparkassen Giro was the only race of the 2015 UCI Women's Road World Cup not to join the World Tour calendar.

Races in the 2016 UCI Women's World Tour
Race	Date	Winner	Second	Third	Leader
(Italy) Strade Bianche	5 March	Lizzie Armitstead (GBR); Boels–Dolmans	Katarzyna Niewiadoma (POL); Orica–AIS	Emma Johansson (SWE); Wiggle High5	Lizzie Armitstead (GBR); Boels–Dolmans
(Netherlands) Ronde van Drenthe	12 March	Chantal Blaak (NED); Boels–Dolmans	Gracie Elvin (AUS); Orica–AIS	Trixi Worrack (DEU); Canyon//SRAM	Anna van der Breggen (NED); Orica–AIS
(Italy) Trofeo Alfredo Binda-Comune di Cittiglio	20 March	Lizzie Armitstead (GBR); Boels–Dolmans	Megan Guarnier (USA); Boels–Dolmans	Jolanda Neff (SUI); Servetto Footon	Lizzie Armitstead (GBR); Boels–Dolmans
(Belgium) Gent–Wevelgem	27 March	Chantal Blaak (NED); Boels–Dolmans	Lisa Brennauer (DEU); Canyon//SRAM	Lucinda Brand (NED); Orica–AIS	Chantal Blaak (NED); Boels–Dolmans
(Belgium) Tour of Flanders	3 April	Lizzie Armitstead (GBR); Boels–Dolmans	Emma Johansson (SWE); Wiggle High5	Chantal Blaak (NED); Boels–Dolmans	Lizzie Armitstead (GBR); Boels–Dolmans
(Belgium) La Flèche Wallonne Féminine	20 April	Anna van der Breggen (NED); Orica–AIS	Evelyn Stevens (USA); Boels–Dolmans	Megan Guarnier (USA); Boels–Dolmans	Lizzie Armitstead (GBR); Boels–Dolmans
(China) Tour of Chongming Island	6 – 8 May	Chloe Hosking (AUS); Wiggle High5	Huang Ting-ying (TWN); Taiwan (national team)	Leah Kirchmann (CAN); Team Liv–Plantur	Lizzie Armitstead (GBR); Boels–Dolmans
(United States) Tour of California	19 – 22 May	Megan Guarnier (USA); Boels–Dolmans	Kristin Armstrong (USA); Twenty16–Ridebiker	Evelyn Stevens (USA); Boels–Dolmans	Megan Guarnier (USA); Boels–Dolmans
(United States) Philadelphia International Cycling Classic	5 June	Megan Guarnier (USA); Boels–Dolmans	Elisa Longo Borghini (ITA); Wiggle High5	Alena Amialiusik (BLR); Canyon//SRAM	Megan Guarnier (USA); Boels–Dolmans
(United Kingdom) The Women's Tour	15 – 19 June	Lizzie Armitstead (GBR); Boels–Dolmans	Ashleigh Moolman (RSA); Cervélo–Bigla Pro Cycling	Elisa Longo Borghini (ITA); Wiggle High5	Megan Guarnier (USA); Boels–Dolmans
(Italy) Giro d'Italia Internazionale Femminile	1 – 10 July	Megan Guarnier (USA); Boels–Dolmans	Evelyn Stevens (USA); Boels–Dolmans	Anna van der Breggen (NED); Orica–AIS	Megan Guarnier (USA); Boels–Dolmans
La Course by Le Tour de France	24 July	Chloe Hosking (AUS); Wiggle High5	Lotta Lepistö (FIN); Cervélo–Bigla Pro Cycling	Marianne Vos (NED); Orica–AIS	Megan Guarnier (USA); Boels–Dolmans
(United Kingdom) RideLondon Classique	30 July	Kirsten Wild (NED); Team Hitec Products	Nina Kessler (NED); Lensworld–Zannata	Leah Kirchmann (CAN); Team Liv–Plantur	Megan Guarnier (USA); Boels–Dolmans
(Sweden) Crescent Vårgårda UCI Women's WorldTour TTT	19 August	Boels–Dolmans	Cervélo–Bigla Pro Cycling	Orica–AIS	Megan Guarnier (USA); Boels–Dolmans
(Sweden) Crescent Vårgårda UCI Women's WorldTour	21 August	Emilia Fahlin (SWE); Alé–Cipollini	Lotta Lepistö (FIN); Cervélo–Bigla Pro Cycling	Chantal Blaak (NED); Boels–Dolmans	Megan Guarnier (USA); Boels–Dolmans
(France) GP de Plouay-Bretagne	27 August	Eugenia Bujak (POL); BTC City Ljubljana	Elena Cecchini (ITA); Canyon//SRAM	Joëlle Numainville (CAN); Cervélo–Bigla Pro Cycling	Megan Guarnier (USA); Boels–Dolmans
(Spain) Madrid Challenge by la Vuelta	11 September	Jolien D'Hoore (BEL); Wiggle High5	Chloe Hosking (AUS); Wiggle High5	Marta Bastianelli (ITA); Alé–Cipollini	Megan Guarnier (USA); Boels–Dolmans
Points at single day races and general classifications (1st place onwards)				Stage points (in stage races)	
120, 100, 85, 70, 60, 50, 40, 35, 30, 25, 20, 18, 16, 14, 12, 10, 8, 6, 4, 2				25, 20, 18, 16, 14, 12, 10, 8, 6, 4	

== Final points standings ==
=== Individual ===
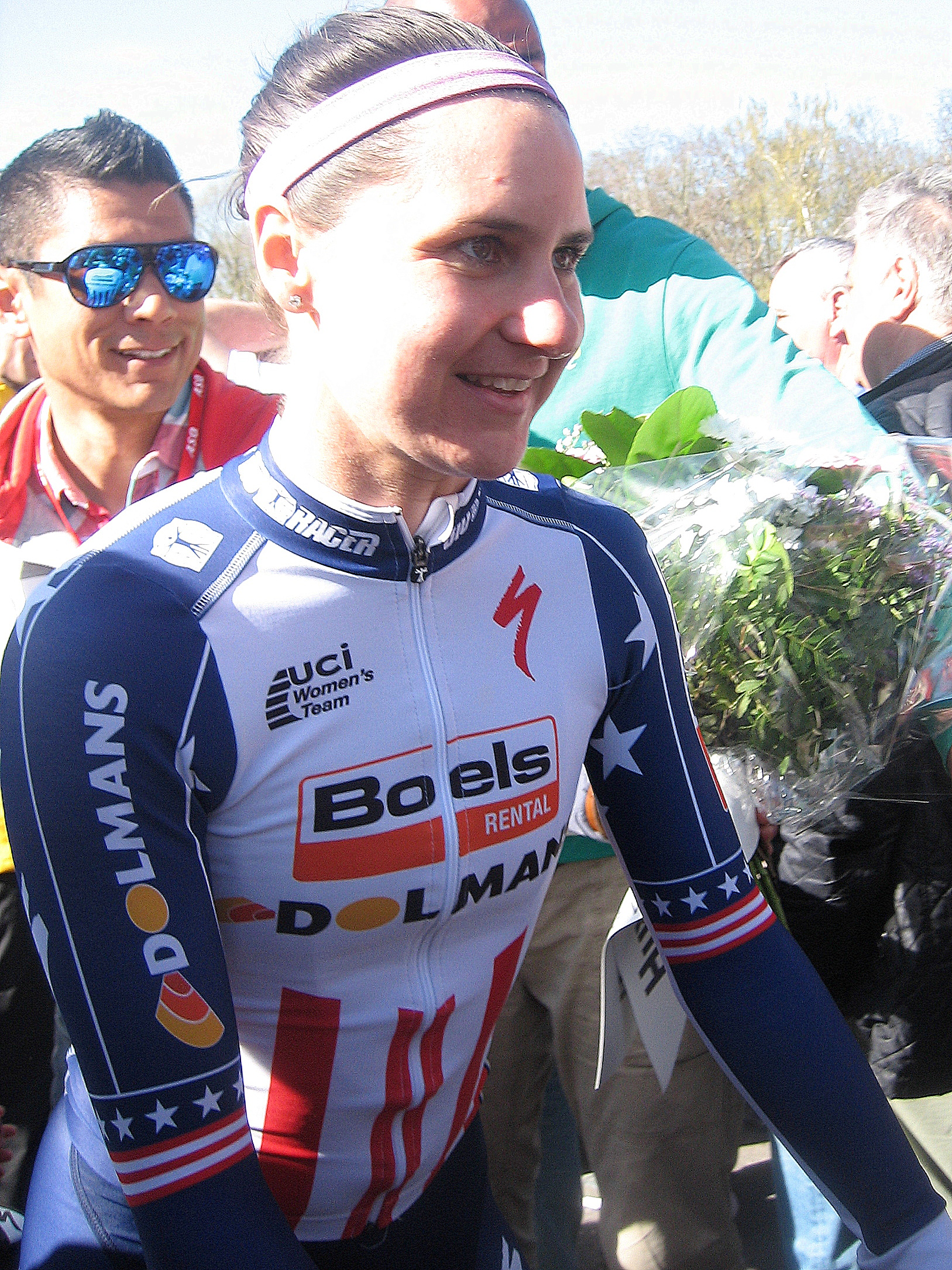
Megan Guarnier (pictured at La Flèche Wallonne), the winner of the individual classification.

Riders tied with the same number of points were classified by number of victories, then number of second places, third places, and so on, in World Tour events and stages.

Individual rankings
Rank	Name	Team(s)	Points
1	Megan Guarnier (USA)	Boels–Dolmans	946
2	Leah Kirchmann (CAN)	Team Liv–Plantur	624
3	Lizzie Armitstead (GBR)	Boels–Dolmans	545
4	Chantal Blaak (NED)	Boels–Dolmans	541
5	Elisa Longo Borghini (ITA)	Wiggle High5	523
6	Evelyn Stevens (USA)	Boels–Dolmans	519
7	Anna van der Breggen (NED)	Rabobank-Liv Woman Cycling Team	492
8	Emma Johansson (SWE)	Wiggle High5	463
9	Chloe Hosking (AUS)	Wiggle High5	450
10	Marianne Vos (NED)	Rabobank-Liv Woman Cycling Team	442
11	Katarzyna Niewiadoma (POL)	Rabobank-Liv Woman Cycling Team	421
12	Alena Amialiusik (BLR)	Canyon//SRAM	288
13	Maria Giulia Confalonieri (ITA)	Lensworld–Zannata	286
14	Lotta Lepistö (FIN)	Cervélo–Bigla Pro Cycling	279
15	Amy Pieters (NED)	Wiggle High5	265
16	Marta Bastianelli (ITA)	Alé–Cipollini	249
17	Eugenia Bujak (POL)	BTC City Ljubljana	245
18	Joëlle Numainville (CAN)	Cervélo–Bigla Pro Cycling	241
19	Carmen Small (USA)	Cervélo–Bigla Pro Cycling; Cylance Pro Cycling	240
20	Roxane Fournier (FRA)	Poitou-Charentes.Futuroscope.86	234
163 riders scored points

=== Youth ===
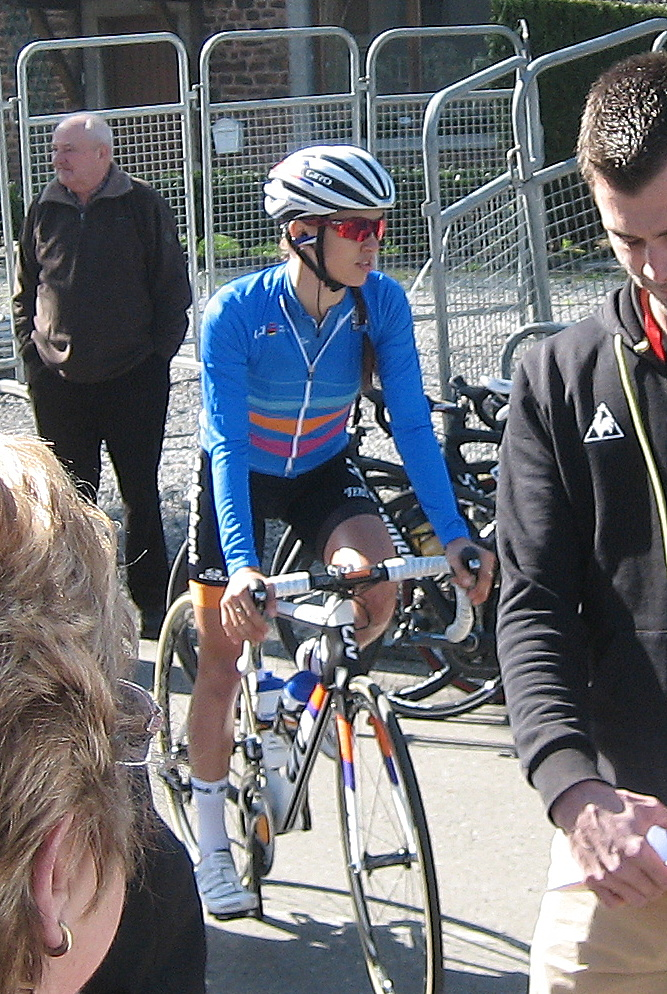
Katarzyna Niewiadoma (pictured at La Flèche Wallonne), the winner of the youth classification.

The top three riders in the final results of each World Tour event's young rider classification received points towards the standings. Six points were awarded to first place, four points to second place and two points to third place.

Youth rankings
Rank	Name	Team	Points
1	Katarzyna Niewiadoma (POL)	Rabobank-Liv Woman Cycling Team	36
2	Floortje Mackaij (NED)	Team Liv–Plantur	18
3	Sheyla Gutiérrez (ESP)	Cylance Pro Cycling	18
4	Jip van den Bos (NED)	Parkhotel Valkenburg Continental Team	14
5	Lotte Kopecky (BEL)	Lotto–Soudal Ladies	12
6	Alice Barnes (GBR)	Drops	10
7	Alexis Ryan (USA)	Canyon//SRAM	10
8	Chanella Stougje (NED)	Parkhotel Valkenburg Continental Team	6
9	Chloé Dygert (USA)	Twenty16–Ridebiker	6
10	Ilaria Sanguineti (ITA)	Bepink	6
11	Alice Maria Arzuffi (ITA)	Lensworld–Zannata	6
12	Arianna Fidanza (ITA)	Astana	6
13	Ksenyia Tuhai (BLR)	Bepink	4
14	Molly Weaver (GBR)	Team Liv–Plantur	4
15	Janelle Cole (USA)	Twenty16–Ridebiker	4
16	Emma White (USA)	Rally Cycling	4
17	Maria Vittoria Sperotto (ITA)	Servetto Footon	4
18	Sofia Beggin (ITA)	Astana	4
19	Kelly Van den Steen (BEL)	Topsport Vlaanderen–Etixx–Guill D'or	4
20	Jessenia Meneses (COL)	Weber Shimano Ladies Power	4
26 riders scored points

=== Team ===
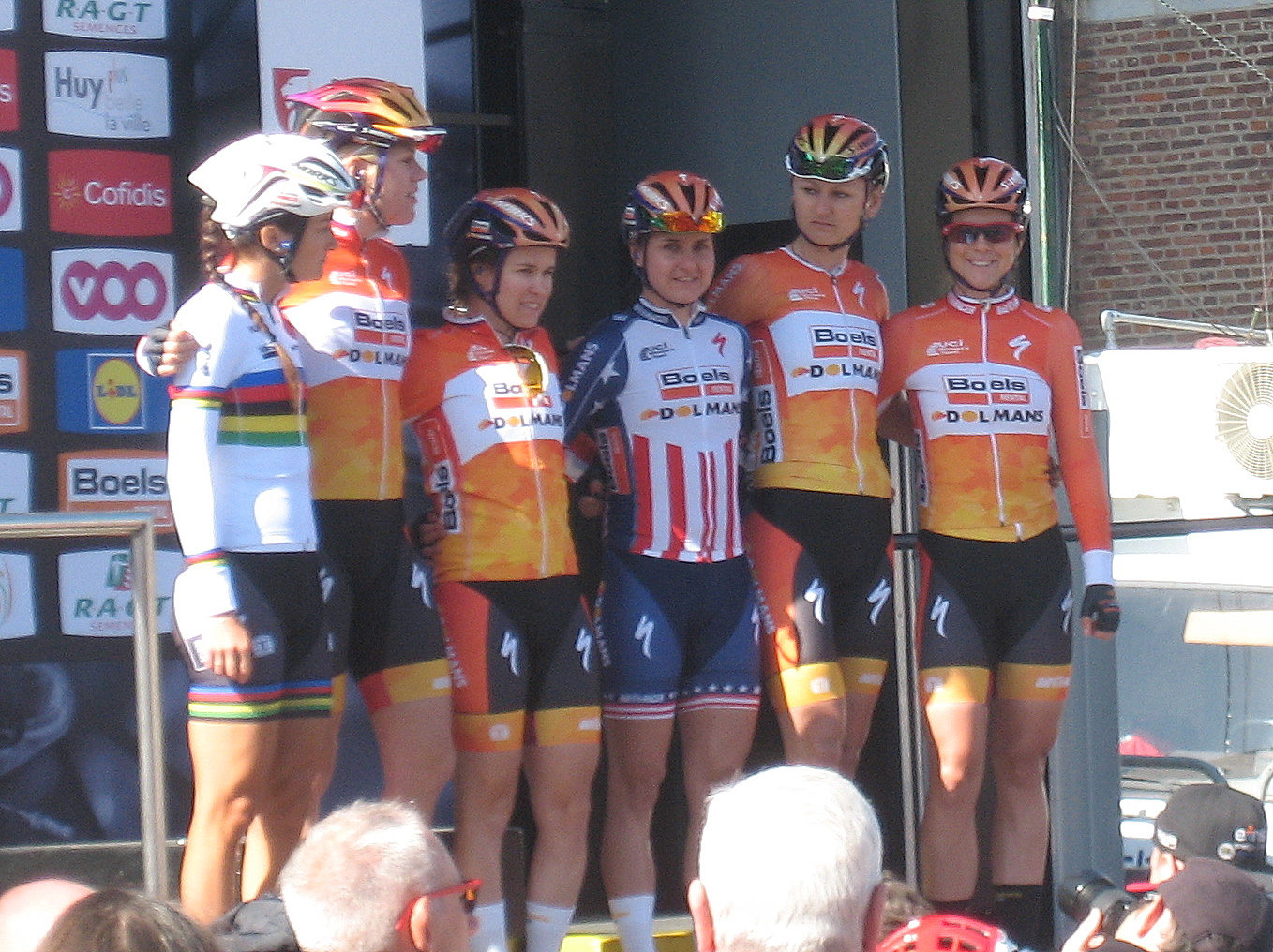
Boels–Dolmans (members of the team pictured at La Flèche Wallonne), the winners of the teams classification.

Team rankings were calculated by adding the ranking points of the top four riders of a team in each race, plus points gained in the Crescent Vårgårda UCI Women's WorldTour TTT.

Team classification
Rank	Team	STR	RON	TRO	GEN	FLA	LFW	CHO	TOC	PHI	AWT	GIR	LAC	RID	TTT	VAR	PLO	MAD	Points
1	Boels–Dolmans	176	130	238	200	325	193		302	190	268	507			140	85	60	80	2894
2	Wiggle High5	169	14	97	118	160	100	187	109	142	301	302	120	20	64	90	30	222	2245
3	Rabobank-Liv Woman Cycling Team	192	86	90	85	60	220		127		171	366	85	114	100	69	88		1853
4	Canyon//SRAM	2	103	78	118	12	54		30	120	72	107	40	30	80	54	131		1031
5	Team Liv–Plantur	25	65	16	40			145			163	118	18	85	48	35	62	20	840
6	Cervélo–Bigla Pro Cycling		8		62	6	18				167		170	50	120	100	93		794
7	Orica–AIS	50	150	45	68	72	61				122		12	8		40	49	14	691
8	Alé–Cipollini	16	60	8			26	102			54	76	4	18	40	120	36	85	645
9	Team Hitec Products	30	35	30				51			16	104	8	120	32			35	461
10	Lensworld–Zannata		4	12		2						64	25	160	28	68	10	60	433
11	Cylance Pro Cycling	8	50			16		40		30	8	50		35	52	28	40	68	425
12	BTC City Ljubljana						2	81		18	14		14	2	60	24	120	47	382
13	Poitou-Charentes.Futuroscope.86		6					134				46	110	34				30	360
14	Lotto–Soudal Ladies	35		6		48	20					126	30				4		269
15	Twenty16–Ridebiker								236	29									265
16	Parkhotel Valkenburg Continental Team						6	164		8	10		6	14	44		2		254
17	UnitedHealthcare			20		10			134	30			16						210
18	Bepink				10	14						55	20	10	56			16	181
19	Servetto Footon	18		85	16		25	36											180
20	Tibco–Silicon Valley Bank		12						61	60			35						168
38 teams scored points
