= 2016 Crescent Vårgårda UCI Women's WorldTour =

The 2016 Crescent Vårgårda Women's WorldTour races joined the new UCI Women's WorldTour for 2016, with the team time trial held on 19 August, and the road race held on 21 August.

== 2016 Crescent Women World Tour Vårgårda Team time trial ==
2016 Crescent Women World Tour Vårgårda Team time trial
2016 UCI Women's World Tour, race 14 of 17

Race details
- Dates: 19 August 2016
- Stages: 1
- Distance: 42.5 km (26.4 mi)
- Winning time: 51' 43"

Results
	Winner	Boels–Dolmans
	Second	Cervélo–Bigla Pro Cycling
	Third	Rabobank-Liv Woman Cycling Team

The 2016 Crescent Women World Tour Vårgårda Team time trial was the ninth edition of the women's team time trial event – the Vårgårda Team time trial. It featured as the 14th round of the 2016 UCI Women's WorldTour.

Taking place over a 42.5 kilometres (26.4 mi) course, the race was won by the Boels–Dolmans team.

=== Results ===
Result
Rank	Team	Time	Speed (km/h)
1	Boels–Dolmans	51' 43"	49.307
2	Cervélo–Bigla Pro Cycling	+ 36"	48.742
3	Rabobank-Liv Woman Cycling Team	+ 1' 16"	48.128
4	Canyon//SRAM	+ 1' 41"	47.753
5	Wiggle High5	+ 1' 45"	47.693
6	BTC City Ljubljana	+ 2' 35"	46.961
7	Bepink	+ 2' 40"	46.889
8	Cylance Pro Cycling	+ 2' 57"	46.646
9	Team Liv-Plantur	+ 3' 07"	46.505
10	Parkhotel Valkenburg	+ 3' 22"	46.293
Source: ProCyclingStats

== 2016 Crescent Vårgårda Women's WorldTour ==
2016 Crescent Vårgårda Women's WorldTour
2016 UCI Women's World Tour, race 15 of 17

Race details
- Stages: 1
- Distance: 141 km (88 mi)
- Winning time: 3h 35' 31"

Results
	Winner	Emilia Fahlin (SWE)	(Alé Cipollini)
	Second	Lotta Lepistö (FIN)	(Cervélo–Bigla Pro Cycling)
	Third	Chantal Blaak (NED)	(Boels–Dolmans)

The 2016 Crescent Vårgårda Women's WorldTour was the eleventh edition of the women's road race at the Open de Suède Vårgårda. It featured as the 15th round of the 2016 UCI Women's WorldTour.

The race was won by Swedish rider Emilia Fahlin of Ale Cipollini in a sprint finish.
