= 2016 La Flèche Wallonne Féminine =

2016 UCI Women's World Tour, race 6 of 17
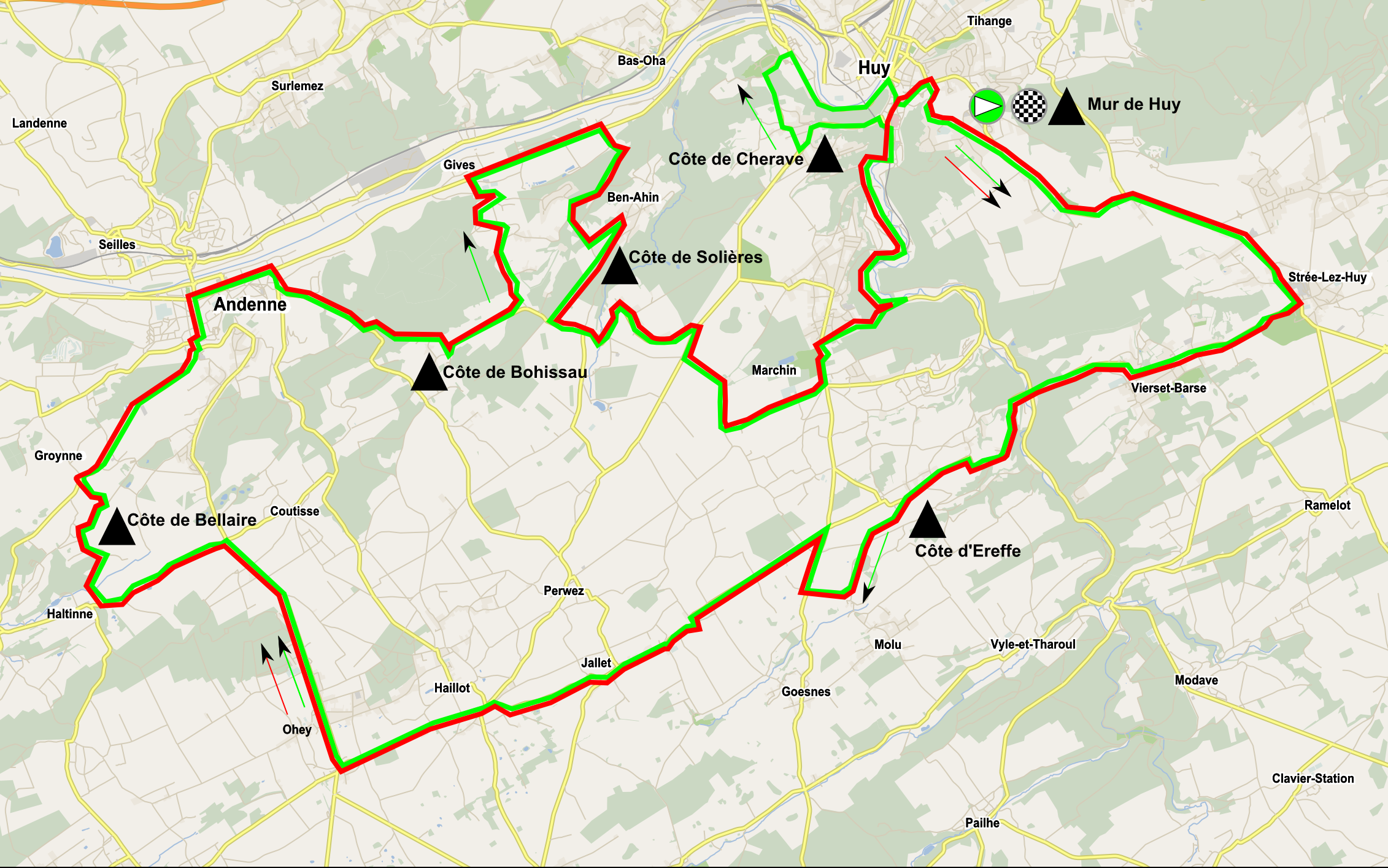

Race details
- Dates: 20 April 2016
- Stages: 1
- Distance: 137 km (85 mi)
- Winning time: 3h 50' 36"

Results
	Winner	Anna van der Breggen (NED)	(Rabobank-Liv Woman Cycling Team)
	Second	Evelyn Stevens (USA)	(Boels–Dolmans)
	Third	Megan Guarnier (USA)	(Boels–Dolmans)

The 2016 La Flèche Wallonne Féminine was the 19th edition of the La Flèche Wallonne Féminine one-day women's road bicycle race held in Belgium, starting and ending in the town of Huy. The race included two climbs of the Mur de Huy; the finish line was at the top of the second of these ascents.

The race was won by Anna van der Breggen (Rabobank-Liv Woman Cycling Team).

== Teams ==
Twenty-five teams participated in the race. Each team had a maximum of six riders:

Professional women's teams

- Rabobank-Liv Woman Cycling Team
- Orica–AIS
- Boels–Dolmans
- Cervélo–Bigla Pro Cycling
- Canyon//SRAM
- Wiggle High5
- Parkhotel Valkenburg Continental Team
- Team Liv–Plantur
- Servetto Footon
- Cylance Pro Cycling
- Team Hitec Products
- Alé–Cipollini
- Poitou-Charentes.Futuroscope.86
- BTC City Ljubljana
- Lotto–Soudal Ladies
- Astana
- Bepink
- Lares–Waowdeals
- Lensworld–Zannata
- Inpa–Bianchi
- Bizkaia–Durango
- Topsport Vlaanderen–Etixx–Guill D'or
- Lointek

National teams

- France
- Australia

== Results ==
Result
Rank	Rider	Team	Time
1	Anna van der Breggen (NED)	Rabobank-Liv Woman Cycling Team	3h 50' 36"
2	Evelyn Stevens (USA)	Boels–Dolmans	+ 8"
3	Megan Guarnier (USA)	Boels–Dolmans	+ 22"
4	Katarzyna Niewiadoma (POL)	Rabobank-Liv Woman Cycling Team	+ 23"
5	Elisa Longo Borghini (ITA)	Wiggle High5	+ 25"
6	Alena Amialiusik (BLR)	Canyon//SRAM	+ 38"
7	Emma Johansson (SWE)	Wiggle High5	+ 43"
8	Katrin Garfoot (AUS)	Orica–AIS	+ 45"
9	Marianne Vos (NED)	Rabobank-Liv Woman Cycling Team	+ 48"
10	Jolanda Neff (SUI)	Servetto Footon	+ 48"
