= 2016 Strade Bianche Women =

2016 Strade Bianche Donne
2016 UCI Women's World Tour, race 1 of 17

Race details
- Dates: 5 March 2016
- Stages: 1
- Distance: 121 km (75 mi)
- Winning time: 3h 30' 13"

Results
	Winner	Lizzie Armitstead (GBR)	(Boels–Dolmans)
	Second	Katarzyna Niewiadoma (POL)	(Rabobank-Liv Woman Cycling Team)
	Third	Emma Johansson (SWE)	(Wiggle High5)

The second edition of the women's Strade Bianche was held on 5 March 2016, in Tuscany, Italy. British world champion Lizzie Armitstead won the race, in bad weather, ahead of Katarzyna Niewiadoma and Emma Johansson.

The women's Strade Bianche served as the first event of the inaugural UCI Women's World Tour, the highest level of professional women's cycling. The race is organized on the same day as the men's event, at a shorter distance, but on much of the same roads.

== Route ==
The Strade Bianche is a one day cycling race starting in and finishing in Siena, notorious for its long sections of white gravel roads (sterrati or strade bianche in Italian). The course runs over hilly terrain in the province of Siena, for a total of 121 km, featuring seven sectors and 22.4 km of dirt roads. Six sectors were in common with the men's route. The race finished on Siena's Piazza del Campo, after a narrow ascent on the roughly-paved Via Santa Caterina in the heart of the medieval city.

== Results ==
Result
Rank	Rider	Team	Time
1	Lizzie Armitstead (GBR)	Boels–Dolmans	3h 30' 13"
2	Katarzyna Niewiadoma (POL)	Rabobank-Liv Woman Cycling Team	+ 3"
3	Emma Johansson (SWE)	Wiggle High5	+ 13"
4	Elisa Longo Borghini (ITA)	Wiggle High5	+ 1' 04"
5	Anna van der Breggen (NED)	Rabobank-Liv Woman Cycling Team	+ 1' 07"
6	Megan Guarnier (USA)	Boels–Dolmans	+ 1' 07"
7	Annemiek van Vleuten (NED)	Orica–AIS	+ 1' 13"
8	Claudia Lichtenberg (GER)	Lotto–Soudal Ladies	+ 1' 17"
9	Lauren Kitchen (AUS)	Team Hitec Products	+ 1' 17"
10	Leah Kirchmann (CAN)	Team Liv–Plantur	+ 1' 21"

== See also ==
- 2016 in women's road cycling
- 2016 UCI Women's World Tour
