= Paule Ka =

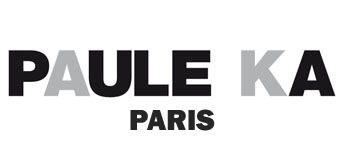
- Industry: retail
- Founded: 1987
- Founder: Serge Cajfinger
- Headquarters: Boulevard poissonnières, Paris, France
- Products: Ready-to-wear
- Revenue: €63 000 000 (2016)
- Number of employees: 200+ (2013)
- Subsidiaries: France; United Kingdom; Spain; Germany; Belgium; USA
- Website: www.pauleka.com

PAULE KA is a French ready-to-wear brand, created in 1987 by Serge Cajfinger.

Born in Lille in 1955, Serge Cajfinger spent his childhood in Brazil; he returned to France in 1968. In 1974, he opened a multi-brand store in Lille known as PAULE KA. Serge Cajfinger later left Lille for Paris to set up a designer label under the same name, opening the first ever PAULE KA store in 1987 in the heart of Paris’ Marais district. The brand's style is geometric and sober, sophisticated yet urban, with some lasting characteristics such as black dresses, must-have bags and the use of bows.

In 2007, State-owned fund Caisse des dépôts et consignations invested in PAULE KA. The fashion house set up its headquarters on the rue Saint Honoré in Paris and opened a store in Cannes. 2011 saw the arrival of Change Capital Partners, who were also to invest in PAULE KA, enabling the brand to set itself new growth objectives.

International development ensued 2012 with the opening of stores in China and across Europe as well as a showroom in New York.

In 2014, Following the decision to change the company's governance, Cajfinger left the House he founded after almost 30 years as Chairman and Creative Director to devote himself to new personal projects.

In July 2015, a year after Cajfinger's departure, Alithia Spuri-Zampetti was appointed Creative Director of PAULE KA.

In July 2017, the company Marco Polo became main shareholder of Maison PAULE KA. Serge Cajfinger takes the lead again to supervise upcoming collections alongside the House's creative team.

Fashion personalities such as Catherine, Princess of Wales, Amal Clooney, Jessica Chastain and Anne Hathaway wear PAULE KA.

== Other lines ==
Following the launch in 2010 of a collection of evening dresses called Black Carpet, Serge Cajfinger has dressed Hollywood actresses including Meryl Streep, Patricia Arquette, Eva Longoria, Sarah Jessica Parker as well as singers Rihanna, Taylor Swift, Selena Gomez and Jennifer Lopez. In 2010, he designed a capsule collection for La Redoute, the largest French mail order retailer, presented by Agyness Deyn.

== Sponsoring ==
In June 2020, Paule Ka announced that they would become the naming rights sponsor of cycling team Bigla–Katusha (later renamed Équipe Paule Ka), until the end of 2024. Starting in August 2020, the company only paid 1 month's salary of the 4 months due. They also failed to pay its sponsorship money causing the team to fold in October 2020.
