= 2016 Trofeo Alfredo Binda-Comune di Cittiglio =

2016 UCI Women's World Tour, race 3 of 17
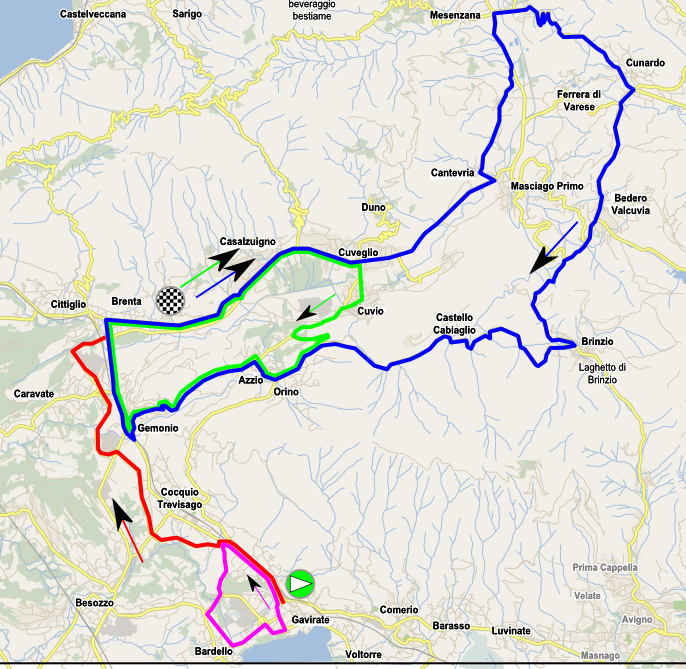

Race details
- Dates: 20 March 2016
- Stages: 1
- Distance: 123.3 km (76.6 mi)
- Winning time: 3h 11' 10"

Results
	Winner	Lizzie Armitstead (GBR)	(Boels–Dolmans)
	Second	Megan Guarnier (USA)	(Boels–Dolmans)
	Third	Jolanda Neff (SUI)	(Servetto Footon)

The 2016 Trofeo Alfredo Binda-Comune di Cittiglio was the 41st running of the women's Trofeo Alfredo Binda-Comune di Cittiglio, a women's bicycle race in Italy. It was the third race of the 2016 UCI Women's World Tour season and was held on 20 March 2016 starting in Gavirate and finishing in Cittiglio. The race was won by the British cyclist Lizzie Armitstead for the second year in a row.

== Results ==
Result
Rank	Rider	Team	Time
1	Lizzie Armitstead (GBR)	Boels–Dolmans	3h 11' 10"
2	Megan Guarnier (USA)	Boels–Dolmans	+ 1"
3	Jolanda Neff (SUI)	Servetto Footon	+ 4"
4	Emma Johansson (SWE)	Wiggle High5	+ 4"
5	Alena Amialiusik (BLR)	Canyon//SRAM	+ 4"
6	Anna van der Breggen (NED)	Rabobank-Liv Woman Cycling Team	+ 4"
7	Katarzyna Niewiadoma (POL)	Rabobank-Liv Woman Cycling Team	+ 11"
8	Annemiek van Vleuten (NED)	Orica–AIS	+ 39"
9	Lauren Kitchen (AUS)	Team Hitec Products	+ 39"
10	Giorgia Bronzini (ITA)	Wiggle High5	+ 39"

== See also ==
- 2016 in women's road cycling
