= 2016 Philadelphia Cycling Classic =

2016 UCI Women's World Tour, race 9 of 17

Race details
- Dates: 5 June 2016
- Stages: 1
- Distance: 118.7 km (73.76 mi)

Results
| | Winner | Megan Guarnier (USA) | (Boels–Dolmans) |
| | Second | Elisa Longo Borghini (ITA) | (Wiggle High5) |
| | Third | Alena Amialiusik (BLR) | (Canyon–SRAM) |

The 2016 Philadelphia Cycling Classic was a one-day women's cycle race, held in Philadelphia on June 5 2016. The race is part of the 2016 UCI Women's World Tour. The race was won by the American Megan Guarnier of Boels–Dolmans.

Result
| Rank | Rider | Team | Time |
|---|---|---|---|
| 1 | Megan Guarnier (USA) | Boels–Dolmans | 2h 59' 22" |
| 2 | Elisa Longo Borghini (ITA) | Wiggle High5 | + 3" |
| 3 | Alena Amialiusik (BLR) | Canyon–SRAM | + 3" |
| 4 | Evelyn Stevens (USA) | Boels–Dolmans | + 9" |
| 5 | Brianne Walle (USA) | Tibco–Silicon Valley Bank | + 11" |
| 6 | Heather Fischer (USA) | Rally Cycling | + 11" |
| 7 | Dani King (GBR) | Wiggle High5 | + 13" |
| 8 | Elena Cecchini (ITA) | Canyon–SRAM | + 14" |
| 9 | Kristabel Doebel-Hickok (USA) | Cylance Pro Cycling | 14" |
| 10 | Alison Jackson (CAN) | TWENTY16–Ridebiker | + 16" |
