= Lauren Kitchen =

Australian racing cyclist

Lauren Rollin (Kitchen)
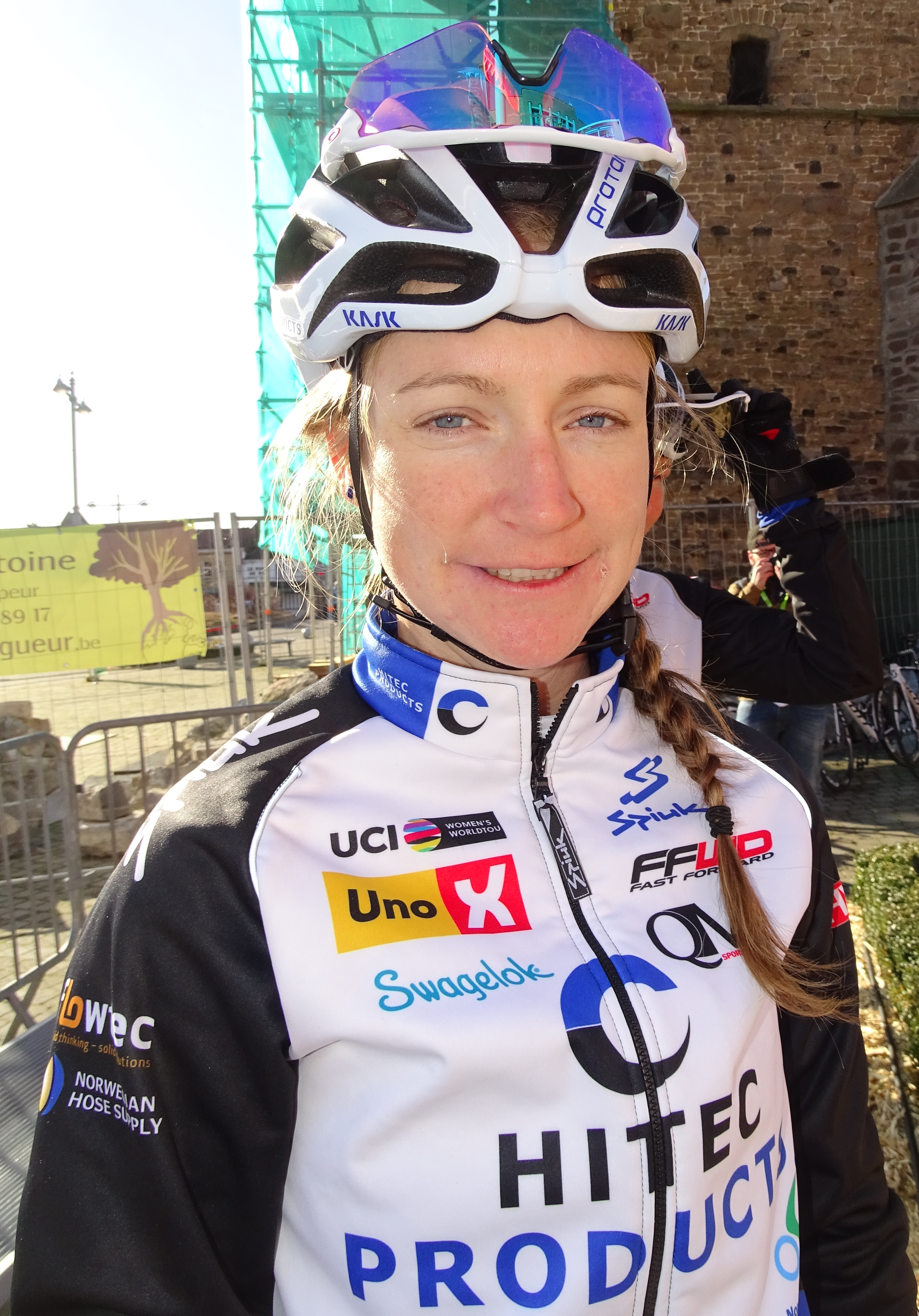
- Kitchen at the 2016 Le Samyn des Dames

Personal information
- Full name: Lauren Rollin
- Born: 21 November 1990 (age 35) Armidale, New South Wales, Australia
- Height: 168 cm (5 ft 6 in)

Cycling career
- Sport: Cycling
- Current team: Retired
- Discipline: Road
- Role: Rider

Amateur teams
- 2008–2009: NSWIS Degani Café
- 2009: MB Cycles Team
- 2009: HP Pinarello
- 2010–2011: Jayco–AIS
- 2011: Rabo Lady Force

Professional teams
- 2012: Rabobank Women Team
- 2013: Wiggle–Honda
- 2014–2016: Team Hitec Products
- 2017: WM3 Energie
- 2018–2021: FDJ Nouvelle-Aquitaine Futuroscope

Lauren Rollin (born 21 November 1990) is an Australian former professional racing cyclist, who rode professionally between 2012 and 2021.

A female road cyclist from New South Wales, Australia, Rollin studied a Bachelor of Planning at the University of NSW in Sydney part-time as well as cycling for NSW and Australia at local, interstate and international events.

In September 2016 she was announced as part of the WM3 Energie squad for 2017. She left the team after one season, joining FDJ Nouvelle-Aquitaine Futuroscope for the 2018 season.

Rollin announced her retirement from professional cycling in May 2021. Lauren Rollin married former professional Canadian cyclist Dominique Rollin in 2021.

== Major results ==
2007
7th Road race, UCI Juniors World Championships
2009
10th Road race, Oceania Road Cycling Championships
2011
National Road Championships

1st Under-23 criterium
1st Under-23 time trial
8th Time trial

4th Open de Suède Vårgårda TTT
2012
National Road Championships

2nd Under-23 time trial
3rd Under-23 criterium
10th Time trial

7th Knokke-Heist – Bredene
2013
1st Criterium, National Under-23 Road Championships
5th 7-Dorpenomloop Aalburg
5th Open de Suède Vårgårda TTT
6th Sparkassen Giro Bochum
10th Overall Ladies Tour of Qatar
2014
National Road Championships

2nd Road race
3rd Criterium

2015
Oceania Road Cycling Championships

1st Road race
2nd Time trial

1st Overall Tour of Zhoushan Island

1st Points classification
1st Stage 2

1st Ronde van Overijssel
2nd Overall The Princess Maha Chackri Sirindhon's Cup

1st Stage 2

2nd Overall Bay Classic Series
4th Overall Women's Tour of New Zealand
7th Omloop van het Hageland
10th Open de Suède Vårgårda
2016
2nd 7-Dorpenomloop Aalburg
2nd Trofee Maarten Wynants
National Road Championships

3rd Criterium
5th Road race

3rd Overall Santos Women's Tour
4th Omloop van de IJsseldelta
5th Cadel Evans Great Ocean Road Race
6th Pajot Hills Classic
8th Ronde van Drenthe
9th Le Samyn des Dames
9th Strade Bianche Women
9th Trofeo Alfredo Binda-Comune di Cittiglio
2017
4th Overall Santos Women's Tour
10th Omloop van het Hageland
2018
1st Grand Prix International d'Isbergues
1st La Picto–Charentaise
2nd Road race, National Road Championships
3rd Le Samyn
6th Cadel Evans Great Ocean Road Race
2019
2nd La Picto–Charentaise
8th Grand Prix International d'Isbergues
2020
3rd Grand Prix International d'Isbergues
