= Équipe Paule Ka =

Women's cycling team

Team information
- UCI code: TBG (2005); BCT (2006–2009, 2012–2015); CBT (2016–2018); BIG (2019–2020); EPK (2020)
- Registered: Switzerland (2005–2015, 2020); Germany (2016–2017); Denmark (2018–2019)
- Founded: 2005
- Disbanded: 2020
- Discipline: Road
- Status: UCI Women's Team
- Bicycles: BMC (2005–2009, 2012–2014); Cervélo (2015–2018); Chapter 2 (2019–2020)
- Website: Team home page

Key personnel
- General manager: Ernst Meier, Mario Vonhof
- Team manager: Emil R. Zimmermann

Team name history
- 2005 2006–2015 2016–2018 2019 2020 2020: Team Bigla; Bigla Cycling Team; Cervélo–Bigla Pro Cycling; Bigla Pro Cycling; Bigla–Katusha; Équipe Paule Ka

Équipe Paule Ka (UCI team code: EPK) was a professional cycling team based in Switzerland, which competed in elite road bicycle racing events such as the UCI Women's World Tour.

== Team history ==
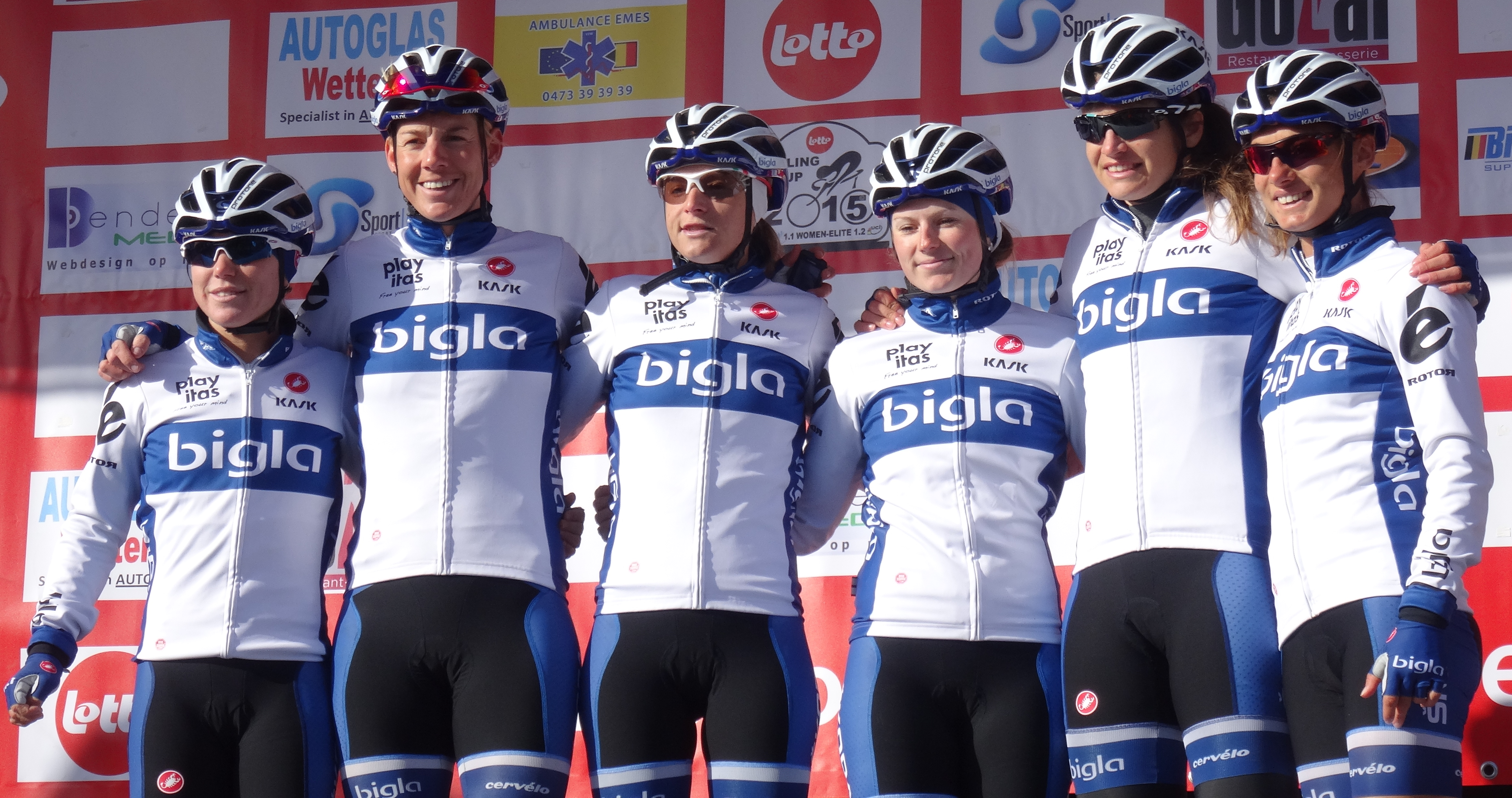
The team at the 2015 Le Samyn des Dames

=== 2015 ===
For the 2015 season the team announced the signing of Annemiek van Vleuten, Ashleigh Moolman Shelley Olds, Doris Schweizer, Iris Slappendel and Sharon Laws. The team also extended the contracts of Vera Koedooder and Lotta Lepistö. On October 30 the Cyclingnews.com announced the signing of Joëlle Numainville. On November 20 the team signed Clara Koppenburg and Caroline Baur as well as extending the contracts of Nicole Hanselmann and Emilie Aubry. On December 1 Jacqueline Hahn and Désirée Ehrler left the team to join Feminine Cycling Team.

=== 2016 ===
In September 2015 it was announced that Cervélo, who supplied bicycle frames for the team in 2015, would become a title sponsor for the 2016 season, with the team becoming Cervélo–Bigla Pro Cycling.

In September 2016, the team announced that British rider Ciara Horne would be joining with immediate effect, and would compete with the team in the team time trial at the World Championships.

=== 2020 funding issues ===
In June 2020, the team's title sponsors Bigla and Katusha Sports announced they would withdraw funding for the team, with the team having to access their UCI bank guarantee in previous months in order to pay rider and staff wages. Paule Ka, a French ready-to-wear clothing brand was later announced as the new title sponsor for the team, agreeing to a deal through to the end of 2024. In October there was uncertainty over the team's future with the team drawing on a UCI bank guarantee to pay rider's salaries. On 16 October the team announced that it would cease racing and close with immediate effect.

== Team roster ==
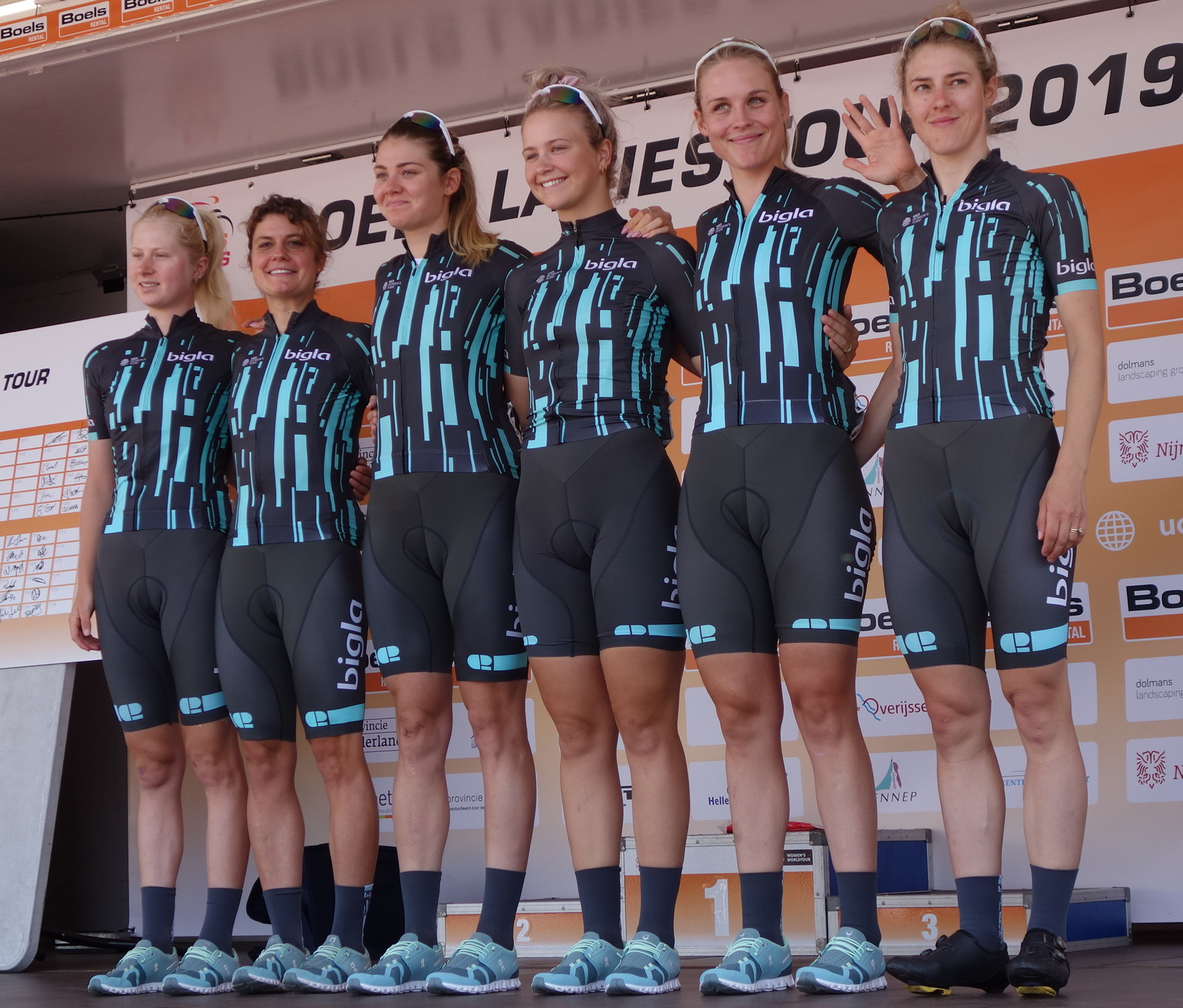
The team at the 2019 Holland Ladies Tour

As of 29 July 2020.

Rider	Date of birth
Lizzy Banks (GBR)	7 November 1990 (aged 29)
Elise Chabbey (SUI)	24 April 1993 (aged 27)
Niamh Fisher-Black (NZL)	12 August 2000 (aged 19)
Mikayla Harvey (NZL)	7 September 1998 (aged 21)
Clara Koppenburg (GER)	3 August 1995 (aged 24)
Emma Cecilie Norsgaard (DNK)	26 July 1999 (aged 21)

Rider	Date of birth
Nikola Nosková (CZE)	1 July 1997 (aged 23)
Marlen Reusser (SUI)	20 September 1991 (aged 28)
Maria Vittoria Sperotto (ITA)	20 November 1996 (aged 23)
Kathrin Stirnemann (SUI)	22 October 1989 (aged 30)
Leah Thomas (USA)	30 May 1989 (aged 31)
Sophie Wright (GBR)	15 March 1999 (aged 21)

== National and continental champions ==
2005
Kazakhstan Time Trial, Zoulfia Zabirov
Kazakhstan Road Race, Zoulfia Zabirova
2006
Kazakhstan Time Trial, Zoulfia Zabirov
2007
Kazakhstan Time Trial, Zoulfia Zabirov
Kazakhstan Road Race, Zoulfia Zabirova
2008
Switzerland Track (Omnium), Andrea Wölfer
Kazakhstan Time Trial, Zoulfia Zabirov
Kazakhstan Road Race, Zoulfia Zabirova
Switzerland Road Race, Jennifer Hohl
2009
Italy Time Trial, Noemi Cantele
Switzerland Time Trial, Karin Thürig
Switzerland Road Race, Jennifer Hohl
2012
Switzerland Time Trial (Juniors), Caroline Baur
2013
Austria Road Race, Andrea Graus
2014
Austria Road Race, Jacqueline Hahn
Finland Road Race, Lotta Lepistö
2015
South Africa Time Trial, Ashleigh Moolman
South Africa Road Race, Ashleigh Moolman
African Time Trial, Ashleigh Moolman
African Road Race, Ashleigh Moolman
Finland Time Trial, Lotta Lepistö
Switzerland Time Trial, Doris Schweizer
Canada Road Race, Joëlle Numainville
Finland Road Race, Lotta Lepistö
Netherlands Track (Points race), Vera Koedooder
2016
USA Time Trial, Carmen Small
Finland Time Trial, Lotta Lepistö
Finland Road Race, Lotta Lepistö
Germany Track (Individual Pursuit), Lisa Klein
2017
South Africa Time Trial, Ashleigh Moolman
Finland Time Trial, Lotta Lepistö
Finland Road Race, Lotta Lepistö
Denmark Time Trial, Cecilie Uttrup Ludwig
Germany Road Race, Lisa Klein
Switzerland Road Race, Nicole Hanselmann
Poland Track (Scratch race), Daria Pikulik
2018
Belgium Time Trial, Ann-Sophie Duyck
Finland Time Trial, Lotta Lepistö
Switzerland Time Trial, Nicole Hanselmann
Denmark Time Trial, Cecilie Uttrup Ludwig
Finland Road Race, Lotta Lepistö
2019
European Track (Madison), Julie Leth
2020
New Zealand Road Race, Niamh Fisher-Black
New Zealand U23 Road Race, Niamh Fisher-Black
Switzerland Time Trial, Marlen Reusser
Czech Time Trial, Nikola Nosková
Denmark Road Race, Emma Cecilie Norsgaard
