= 2017 in women's road cycling =

2017 in women's road cycling is about the 2017 women's bicycle races ruled by the UCI and the 2017 UCI Women's Teams.

== World Rankings ==
UCI Women's World Rankings (Individual), as of 31 December 2017
Rank	Rider	Team	Points	Prev	Move^{♦}
1	Annemiek van Vleuten (NED)	Orica–Scott	1475.00	1	Steady
2	Anna van der Breggen (NED)	Boels–Dolmans	1252.00	2	Steady
3	Marianne Vos (NED)	WM3 Energie	1012.00	3	Steady
4	Ellen van Dijk (NED)	Team Sunweb	1003.00	4	Steady
5	Katarzyna Niewiadoma (POL)	WM3 Energie	999.00	5	Steady

^{♦}Change since previous week's rankings
^{♣}U23 rider

UCI Women's World Rankings (Teams), as of 31 December 2017
Rank	Team	Points	Prev	Move^{♦}
1	Boels–Dolmans	3368	1	Steady
2	Team Sunweb	3050	2	Steady
3	Orica–Scott	2705	3	Steady
4	WM3 Energie	2413	5	▲
5	Cervélo–Bigla Pro Cycling	2334	4	▼

UCI Women's World Rankings (Nations), as of 31 December 2017
Rank	Nation	Points	Prev	Move^{♦}
1	Netherlands	5398	1	Steady
2	United States	2545	2	Steady
3	Italy	2396	3	Steady
4	Australia	2260	4	Steady
5	United Kingdom	1672	5	Steady

== World Championships ==
The World Road Championships is set to be held in Bergen, Norway.

	Race	Date	Winner	Second	Third
World Road Championships	Team Time Trial	17 September	(Netherlands) Team Sunweb	(Netherlands) Boels–Dolmans	(Germany) Cervélo–Bigla Pro Cycling
World Road Championships	Team Time Trial	17 September	Lucinda Brand (NED); Leah Kirchmann (CAN); Floortje Mackaij (NED); Coryn Rivera (USA); Sabrina Stultiens (NED); Ellen van Dijk (NED)	Chantal Blaak (NED); Karol-Ann Canuel (CAN); Megan Guarnier (USA); Christine Majerus (LUX); Amy Pieters (NED); Anna van der Breggen (NED)	Stephanie Gaumnitz (GER); Lisa Klein (GER); Clara Koppenburg (GER); Lotta Lepistö (FIN); Cecilie Uttrup Ludwig (DEN); Ashleigh Moolman (RSA)
World Road Championships	Individual Time Trial	19 September	Annemiek van Vleuten (NED)	Anna van der Breggen (NED)	Katrin Garfoot (AUS)
World Road Championships	Road Race	23 September	Chantal Blaak (NED)	Katrin Garfoot (AUS)	Amalie Dideriksen (DEN)

== UCI Women's WorldTour ==
Races in the 2017 UCI Women's World Tour
Race	Date	Winner	Second	Third	Leader
(Italy) Strade Bianche	4 March	Elisa Longo Borghini (ITA); Wiggle High5	Katarzyna Niewiadoma (POL); WM3 Pro Cycling	Lizzie Deignan (GBR); Boels–Dolmans	Elisa Longo Borghini (ITA); Wiggle High5
(Netherlands) Ronde van Drenthe	11 March	Amalie Dideriksen (DEN); Boels–Dolmans	Elena Cecchini (ITA); Canyon//SRAM	Lucinda Brand (NED); Team Sunweb	Elisa Longo Borghini (ITA); Wiggle High5
(Italy) Trofeo Alfredo Binda-Comune di Cittiglio	19 March	Coryn Rivera (USA); Team Sunweb	Arlenis Sierra (CUB); Astana	Cecilie Uttrup Ludwig (DEN); Cervélo–Bigla Pro Cycling	Elisa Longo Borghini (ITA); Wiggle High5
(Belgium) Gent–Wevelgem	26 March	Lotta Lepistö (FIN); Cervélo–Bigla Pro Cycling	Jolien D'Hoore (BEL); Wiggle High5	Coryn Rivera (USA); Team Sunweb	Elisa Longo Borghini (ITA); Wiggle High5
(Belgium) Tour of Flanders	2 April	Coryn Rivera (USA); Team Sunweb	Gracie Elvin (AUS); Orica–Scott	Chantal Blaak (NED); Boels–Dolmans	Coryn Rivera (USA); Team Sunweb
(Netherlands) Amstel Gold Race	16 April	Anna van der Breggen (NED); Boels–Dolmans	Lizzie Deignan (GBR); Boels–Dolmans	Dead heat (Note: Race officials were unable to split Katarzyna Niewiadoma (POL) (WM3 Pro Cycling) and Annemiek van Vleuten (NED) (Orica–Scott) in the photo-finish.); Katarzyna Niewiadoma (POL) (WM3 Pro Cycling); Annemiek van Vleuten (NED) (Orica–Scott)	Coryn Rivera (USA); Team Sunweb
(Belgium) La Flèche Wallonne	19 April	Anna van der Breggen (NED); Boels–Dolmans	Lizzie Deignan (GBR); Boels–Dolmans	Katarzyna Niewiadoma (POL); WM3 Pro Cycling	Coryn Rivera (USA); Team Sunweb
(Belgium) Liège–Bastogne–Liège	23 April	Anna van der Breggen (NED); Boels–Dolmans	Lizzie Deignan (GBR); Boels–Dolmans	Katarzyna Niewiadoma (POL); WM3 Pro Cycling	Annemiek van Vleuten (NED); Orica–Scott
(China) Tour of Chongming Island	5–7 May	Jolien D'Hoore (BEL); Wiggle High5	Kirsten Wild (NED); Cylance Pro Cycling	Chloe Hosking (AUS); Alé–Cipollini	Annemiek van Vleuten (NED); Orica–Scott
(United States) Tour of California	11–14 May	Anna van der Breggen (NED); Boels–Dolmans	Katie Hall (USA); UnitedHealthcare	Arlenis Sierra (CUB); Astana	Anna van der Breggen (NED); Boels–Dolmans
(United Kingdom) The Women's Tour	7–11 June	Katarzyna Niewiadoma (POL); WM3 Pro Cycling	Christine Majerus (LUX); Boels–Dolmans	Hannah Barnes (GBR); Canyon//SRAM	Katarzyna Niewiadoma (POL); WM3 Pro Cycling
(Italy) Giro d'Italia Internazionale Femminile	30 June–9 July	Anna van der Breggen (NED); Boels–Dolmans	Elisa Longo Borghini (ITA); Wiggle High5	Annemiek van Vleuten (NED); Orica–Scott	Anna van der Breggen (NED); Boels–Dolmans
La Course by Le Tour de France	20 July	Annemiek van Vleuten (NED); Orica–Scott	Lizzie Deignan (GBR); Boels–Dolmans	Elisa Longo Borghini (ITA); Wiggle High5	Anna van der Breggen (NED); Boels–Dolmans
(United Kingdom) RideLondon Classique	29 July	Coryn Rivera (USA); Team Sunweb	Lotta Lepistö (FIN); Cervélo–Bigla Pro Cycling	Lisa Brennauer (GER); Canyon//SRAM	Anna van der Breggen (NED); Boels–Dolmans
(Sweden) Crescent Vårgårda Team Time Trial	11 August	Boels–Dolmans	Cervélo–Bigla Pro Cycling	Canyon//SRAM	Anna van der Breggen (NED); Boels–Dolmans
(Sweden) Crescent Vårgårda Road Race	13 August	Lotta Lepistö (FIN); Cervélo–Bigla Pro Cycling	Marianne Vos (NED); WM3 Pro Cycling	Leah Kirchmann (CAN); Team Sunweb	Anna van der Breggen (NED); Boels–Dolmans
Ladies Tour of Norway	17–20 August	Marianne Vos (NED); WM3 Pro Cycling	Megan Guarnier (USA); Boels–Dolmans	Ellen van Dijk (NED); Team Sunweb	Anna van der Breggen (NED); Boels–Dolmans
(France) GP de Plouay-Lorient Agglomération	26 August	Lizzie Deignan (GBR); Boels–Dolmans	Pauline Ferrand-Prévot (FRA); Canyon//SRAM	Sarah Roy (AUS); Orica–Scott	Anna van der Breggen (NED); Boels–Dolmans
(Netherlands) Holland Ladies Tour	29 August–3 September	Annemiek van Vleuten (NED); Orica–Scott	Anna van der Breggen (NED); Boels–Dolmans	Ellen van Dijk (NED); Team Sunweb	Anna van der Breggen (NED); Boels–Dolmans
(Spain) Madrid Challenge by la Vuelta	10 September	Jolien D'Hoore (BEL); Wiggle High5	Coryn Rivera (USA); Team Sunweb	Roxane Fournier (FRA); FDJ Nouvelle-Aquitaine Futuroscope	Anna van der Breggen (NED); Boels–Dolmans

== Single day races (1.1 and 1.2) ==
Race	Date	Cat. †	Winner	Second	Third
(Australia) Cadel Evans Great Ocean Road Race	January 28	1.2	Annemiek van Vleuten (NED)	Ruth Winder (USA)	Mayuko Hagiwara (JPN)
(Belgium) Omloop Het Nieuwsblad	February 25	1.1	Lucinda Brand (NED)	Chantal Blaak (NED)	Annemiek van Vleuten (NED)
(Belgium) Omloop van het Hageland	February 26	1.1	Jolien D'Hoore (BEL)	Chloe Hosking (AUS)	Sarah Roy (AUS)
(Belgium) Le Samyn des Dames	March 1	1.2	Sheyla Gutiérrez (ESP)	Amy Pieters (NED)	Tiffany Cromwell (AUS)
(Netherlands) Acht van Westerveld	March 12	1.2	Chloe Hosking (AUS)	Lotte Kopecky (BEL)	Amalie Dideriksen (DEN)
(Belgium) Dwars door Vlaanderen	March 22	1.1	Lotta Lepistö (FIN)	Gracie Elvin (AUS)	Lisa Brennauer (GER)
(Belgium) Pajot Hills Classic	March 29	1.2	Annette Edmondson (AUS)	Barbara Guarischi (ITA)	Ilaria Sanguineti (ITA)
(Belgium) Grand Prix de Dottignies	April 3	1.2	Jolien D'Hoore (BEL)	Chloe Hosking (AUS)	Jelena Erić (SRB)
(Netherlands) EPZ Omloop van Borsele	April 22	1.1	Riejanne Markus (NED)	Eugenia Bujak (POL)	Marianne Vos (NED)
(Italy) GP della Liberazione	April 25	1.2	Marta Bastianelli (ITA)	Rasa Leleivytė (LTU)	Soraya Paladin (ITA)
(United Kingdom) Tour de Yorkshire	April 29	1.2	Lizzie Deignan (GBR)	Coryn Rivera (USA)	Giorgia Bronzini (ITA)
(Belgium) Trofee Maarten Wynants	May 7	1.2	Marianne Vos (NED)	Maria Giulia Confalonieri (ITA)	Eva Buurman (NED)
(Netherlands) Rabobank Marianne Vos Classic	May 13	1.2	Marianne Vos (NED)	Moniek Tenniglo (NED)	Demi de Jong (NED)
(Belgium) Dwars door de Westhoek	May 14	1.1	Valentina Scandolara (ITA)	Natalie van Gogh (ITA)	Maria Giulia Confalonieri (ITA)
(Spain) Durango-Durango Emakumeen Saria	May 16	1.2	Annemiek van Vleuten (NED)	Shara Gillow (AUS)	Eider Merino (ESP)
(Netherlands) Salverda Omloop van de IJsseldelta	May 20	1.2	Nina Buysman (NED)	Loes Adegeest (NED)	Lucy Garner (GBR)
(Netherlands) Ronde van Gelderland	April 21	1.2	Cancelled		
(France) La Classique Morbihan	May 25	1.1	Ashleigh Moolman (RSA)	Alena Amialiusik (BLR)	Cecilie Uttrup Ludwig (DEN)
(France) Grand Prix de Plumelec-Morbihan Dames	May 26	1.1	Ashleigh Moolman (RSA)	Alena Amialiusik (BLR)	Shara Gillow (AUS)
(Ukraine) Horizon Park Women Challenge	May 27	1.2	Alžbeta Pavlendová (SVK)	Taisa Naskovich (BLR)	Maryna Ivaniuk (UKR)
(Ukraine) VR Women ITT	May 28	1.2	Hanna Solovey (UKR)	Olga Shekel (UKR)	Valeriya Kononenko (UKR)
(Belgium) Gooik–Geraardsbergen–Gooik	May 28	1.1	Marianne Vos (NED)	Ellen van Dijk (NED)	Maria Giulia Confalonieri (ITA)
(United States) Winston-Salem Cycling Classic	May 29	1.2	Lauren Stephens (USA)	Leah Thomas (USA)	Lauretta Hanson (AUS)
(Canada) Grand Prix Cycliste de Gatineau	June 1	1.1	Leah Kirchmann (CAN)	Kirsti Lay (CAN)	Kendall Ryan (USA)
(Canada) Chrono Gatineau	June 2	1.1	Lauren Stephens (USA)	Karol-Ann Canuel (CAN)	Amber Neben (USA)
(Belgium) Zuidkempense Ladies Classic	June 4	1.2	Cancelled		
(Slovenia) Ljubljana–Domžale–Ljubljana TT	June 9	1.2	Ann-Sophie Duyck (BEL)	Eugenia Bujak (POL)	Elinor Barker (GBR)
(Belgium) Diamond Tour	June 11	1.1	Nina Kessler (NED)	Monique van de Ree (NED)	Chiara Consonni (ITA)
(Italy) Giro del Trentino Alto Adige – Sudtirol	June 17	1.1	Nikola Nosková (CZE)	Hanna Nilsson (SWE)	Sina Frei (SUI)
(Canada) White Spot / Delta Road Race	July 9	1.2	Kendall Ryan (USA)	Elizabeth Williams (AUS)	Holly Edmondston (NZL)
(United States) Grand Prix of Boise	July 14	1.2	Cancelled		
(Belgium) Erondegemse Pijl	August 5	1.2	Julia Soek (NED)	Rachel Neylan (AUS)	Esther Van Veen (NED)
(France) Chrono Champenois	September 10	1.1	Cancelled		
(Italy) Giro dell'Emilia Internazionale Donne Elite	September 30	1.1	Tatiana Guderzo (ITA)	Rasa Leleivytė (LTU)	Rossella Ratto (ITA)
(Italy) Gran Premio Bruno Beghelli Internazionale Donne Elite	October 1	1.1	Marta Bastianelli (ITA)	Elisa Balsamo (ITA)	Letizia Paternoster (ITA)
(France) Chrono des Nations	October 15	1.1	Audrey Cordon (FRA)	Ann-Sophie Duyck (BEL)	Hayley Simmonds (GBR)
(China) Tour of Guangxi Women's Elite World Challenge	October 24	1.1	Maria Vittoria Sperotto (ITA)	Amy Cure (AUS)	Lucy Garner (GBR)
(South Africa) Telkom 947 Cycle Challenge	November 19	1.1	Ashleigh Moolman (RSA)	Vita Heine (NOR)	Christa Riffel (GER)

† The clock symbol denotes a race which takes the form of a one-day time trial.

== Stage races (2.1 and 2.2) ==
Race	Date	Cat.	Winner	Second	Third
(Australia) Santos Women's Tour	January 14–17	2.2	Amanda Spratt (AUS)	Janneke Ensing (NED)	Kirsten Wild (NED)
(Spain) Setmana Ciclista Valenciana	March 8–11	2.2	Cecilie Uttrup Ludwig (DEN)	Arlenis Sierra (CUB)	Ashleigh Moolman (RSA)
(United States) Joe Martin Stage Race	March 30–April 2	2.2	Ruth Winder (USA)	Lauren Stephens (USA)	Claire Rose (GBR)
(Netherlands) Healthy Ageing Tour	April 5–9	2.2	Ellen van Dijk (NED)	Anna van der Breggen (NED)	Lisa Brennauer (GER)
(United States) Tour of the Gila	April 19–23	2.2	Tayler Wiles (USA)	Katie Hall (USA)	Leah Thomas (USA)
(Czech Republic) Gracia–Orlová	April 27–30	2.2	Riejanne Markus (NED)	Anouska Koster (NED)	Moniek Tenniglo (NED)
(Luxembourg) Festival Luxembourgeois du cyclisme féminin Elsy Jacobs	April 28–30	2.1	Christine Majerus (LUX)	Eugenia Bujak (POL)	Ashleigh Moolman (RSA)
(China) Tour of Zhoushan Island	May 10–12	2.1	Charlotte Becker (GER)	Anastasiia Iakovenko (RUS)	Emilie Moberg (NOR)
(Spain) Emakumeen Euskal Bira	May 17–21	2.1	Ashleigh Moolman-Pasio (RSA)	Annemiek van Vleuten (NED)	Katrin Garfoot (AUS)
(Czech Republic) Tour de Feminin-O cenu Českého Švýcarska	July 6–9	2.2	Ruth Winder (USA)	Tayler Wiles (USA)	Ann-Sophie Duyck (BEL)
(Germany) Internationale Thüringen Rundfahrt der Frauen	July 12–18	2.1	Lisa Brennauer (GER)	Ellen van Dijk (NED)	Hayley Simmonds (GBR)
(Netherlands) BeNe Ladies Tour	July 13–16	2.1	Marianne Vos (NED)	Alice Barnes (GBR)	Annette Edmondson (AUS)
(United States) Cascade Cycling Classic	July 19–23	2.2	Allie Dragoo (USA)	Sara Poidevin (CAN)	Jasmin Glaesser (CAN)
(Poland) Tour de Pologne Féminin	July 23–27	2.2	Cancelled		
Vuelta Internacional Femenina a Costa Rica	July 26–30	2.2	Arlenis Sierra (CUB)	Blanca Liliana Moreno (COL)	Lilibeth Chacón (COL)
La Route de France	August 5–13	2.1	Cancelled		
(France) Trophée d'Or Féminin	August 21–24	2.2	Cancelled		
Lotto Belisol Belgium Tour	September 5–8	2.1	Anouska Koster (NED)	Ruth Winder (USA)	Marianne Vos (NED)
(France) Tour Cycliste Féminin International de l'Ardèche	September 5–10	2.2	Lucy Kennedy (AUS)	Hanna Nilsson (SWE)	Leah Thomas (USA)
(Italy) Giro della Toscana	September 8–10	2.2	Ashleigh Moolman (RSA)	Cecilie Uttrup Ludwig (DEN)	Ewelina Szbiak (POL)
Vuelta a Colombia Femenina Oro y Paz	October 24–29	2.2	Ana Sanabria (COL)	Lilibeth Chacón (COL)	Blanca Liliana Moreno (COL)

== Championships ==
=== International Games ===
Championships	Race	Winner	Second	Third
(Malaysia) Southeast Asian Games	Criterium	Nguyễn Thị Thật (VIE)	Jupha Somnet (MAS)	Jutatip Maneephan (THA)
(Malaysia) Southeast Asian Games	Road race	Nguyễn Thị Thật (VIE)	Jupha Somnet (MAS)	Ayustina Delia Priatna (INA)
(San Marino) Games of the Small States of Europe	Road Race	Elise Maes (LUX)	Erla Sigurlaug Sigurdardottir (ISL)	Edie Antonia Rees (LUX)
(San Marino) Games of the Small States of Europe	Team Road Race	Luxembourg	Malta	Not awarded
(San Marino) Games of the Small States of Europe	Time Trial	Antri Christoforou (CYP)	Elise Maes (LUX)	Anne-Sophie Harsch (LUX)
(Gotland) Island Games	Individual Time Trial	Christine McLean (Shetland)	Karina Bowie (JER)	Florence Cox (GUE)
(Gotland) Island Games	Team Time Trial	Guernsey	Jersey	Isle of Man
(Gotland) Island Games	Road Race	Tara Ferguson (Isle of Man)	Zoenique Williams (Bermuda)	Nicole Mitchell (Bermuda)
(Gotland) Island Games	Road Race (Team)	Isle of Man	Bermuda	Guernsey
(Gotland) Island Games	Criterium	Zandra Larsson (Gotland)	Zoenique Williams (BER)	Florence Cox (JEY)
(Gotland) Island Games	Criterium (Team)	Bermuda (BER)	Isle of Man (IOM)	Jersey (JEY)
(Ivory Coast) Jeux de la Francophonie	Road Race	Pauline Allin (FRA)	Soline Lamboley (FRA)	Lex Albrecht (CAN)
(Martinique) Caribbean Cycling Championships	Road race	Teniel Campbell (TRI)	Solymar Rivera (PUR)	Nicole Mitchell (BER)
(Martinique) Caribbean Cycling Championships	Time Trial	Teniel Campbell (TRI)	Lisa Groothuesheidkamp (CUR)	Laura Gueppois (MTQ)
(Colombia) Juegos Bolivarianos	Road race	Lilibeth Chacón (VEN)	Diana Peñuela (COL)	Paula Patiño (COL)
(Colombia) Juegos Bolivarianos	Time Trial	Aranza Villalón (CHI)	Ana Sanabria (COL)	Lilibeth Chacón (VEN)

=== Continental Championships ===
Championships	Race	Winner	Second	Third
African Continental Championships; Egypt	Road race	(Mauritius) Aurelie Halbwachs	(Mauritius) Kimberley Le Court	(South Africa) Charlene Roux
African Continental Championships; Egypt	Individual time trial	(Mauritius) Aurelie Halbwachs	(Eritrea) Mossana Debesay	(South Africa) Juanita Venter
African Continental Championships; Egypt	Team time trial	Eritrea; Wehazit Kidane; Mossana Debesay; Bisrat Ghebremeskel; Wegaheta Gebrihiwt	Ethiopia; Selam Amha; Birhan Fkadu Abrha; Tsega Beyene; Eyeru Tesfoam Gebru	Egypt; Zayed Ahmed Ebtisam; Menatalla Essam; Donia Mohamed Rashwan; Fatma Hagrus
Oceania Cycling Championships; Australia	Road race	(Australia) Lisen Hockings	(Australia) Shannon Malseed	(Australia) Lucy Kennedy
Oceania Cycling Championships; Australia	Individual time trial	(Australia) Lucy Kennedy	(Australia) Rebecca Mackey	(Australia) Lisen Hockings
Oceania Cycling Championships; Australia	U23 Individual time trial	(Australia) Jaime Gunning	(New Zealand) Mikayla Harvey	(New Zealand) Madeleine Park
Pan American Championships; Dominican Republic	Road race	(Chile) Paola Muñoz	(Brazil) Wellynda Do Santos	(United States) Skylar Schneider
Pan American Championships; Dominican Republic	Individual time trial	(United States) Chloé Dygert	(United States) Tayler Wiles	(Cuba) Marlies Mejías
Asian Cycling Championships; Bahrain (2017 summary)	Road race	(Hong Kong) Qianyu Yang	(South Korea) Ahreum Na	(Japan) Miho Yoshikawa
Asian Cycling Championships; Bahrain (2017 summary)	U23 Road race	(Taiwan) Chiayun Li	(Hong Kong) Yao Pang	(Kazakhstan) Rinata Akhmetcha
Asian Cycling Championships; Bahrain (2017 summary)	Individual time trial	(China) Hongyu Liang	(South Korea) Ju Mi Lee	(Japan) Yumi Kajihara
Asian Cycling Championships; Bahrain (2017 summary)	U23 Individual time trial	(Kazakhstan) Yekaterina Yuraitis	(Hong Kong) Yao Pang	(Jordan) Razan Soboh
European Road Championships; Denmark (2017 summary)	Road race	Marianne Vos (NED)	Giorgia Bronzini (ITA)	Olga Zabelinskaya (RUS)
European Road Championships; Denmark (2017 summary)	Individual time trial	Ellen van Dijk (NED)	Ann-Sophie Duyck (BEL)	Anna van der Breggen (NED)
European Road Championships; Denmark (2017 summary)	Road race (U23)	Pernille Mathiesen (DEN)	Susanne Andersen (NOR)	Alice Barnes (GBR)
European Road Championships; Denmark (2017 summary)	Individual time trial (U23)	Pernille Mathiesen (DEN)	Cecilie Uttrup Ludwig (DEN)	Lisa Klein (GER)

== UCI teams ==
The country designation of each team is determined by the country of registration of the largest number of its riders, and is not necessarily the country where the team is registered or based.
