= 2017 UCI Women's World Tour =

Series of women's road cycling races

- Second edition of the UCI Women's WorldTour

Details
- Dates: 4 March – 10 September
- Location: Europe, USA and China
- Races: 20

Champions
- Individual champion: Anna van der Breggen (Boels–Dolmans)
- Teams' champion: Boels–Dolmans

The 2017 UCI Women's World Tour was the second edition of the UCI Women's World Tour. For the 2017 season, the calendar consisted of 20 races, up from 17 in 2016. Two one-day races – the Amstel Gold Race and Liège–Bastogne–Liège, to complete an Ardennes classics week – were added along with the Ladies Tour of Norway and the Holland Ladies Tour; all 2016 races returned for the 2017 calendar, with the exception of the cancelled Philadelphia International Cycling Classic.

The individual classification was won by Dutch rider Anna van der Breggen, riding for the Boels–Dolmans team. Van der Breggen took the lead of the standings after winning the Tour of California, and after losing the lead to Poland's Katarzyna Niewiadoma (WM3 Energie) after the Women's Tour, van der Breggen regained the lead after victory at the Giro d'Italia Femminile. Van der Breggen, who won five races during 2017 – including all three Ardennes classics – maintained her lead throughout the remainder of the season, ultimately winning the overall classification by 27 points from compatriot Annemiek van Vleuten from the Orica–Scott team. Van Vleuten closed the gap in points over the second half of the season, finishing third at the Giro d'Italia Femminile before victories at La Course by Le Tour de France, and the Holland Ladies Tour. Third place in the standings went to Niewiadoma, who took podium finishes in all three Ardennes classics and a second place at Strade Bianche, alongside her Women's Tour victory.

In the other classifications, Cervélo–Bigla Pro Cycling rider Cecilie Uttrup Ludwig from Denmark was the winner of the youth classification for riders under the age of 23. Uttrup Ludwig took seven victories in the classification, and finished with over three times as many points compared to her nearest challengers. Boels–Dolmans were the winners of the teams classification, taking eight wins during the season. Team Sunweb, and their American rider Coryn Rivera, took three victories as they finished as runners-up in the standings.

== Teams ==
2017 UCI Women's World Teams, invitational ranking & equipment
Code	Official Team Name	Country	Rank (Note: This is the UCI's 'Invitational Ranking', the top 20 teams in the Invitational Rankings are guaranteed entry into Women's World Tour one-day-races, and the top 15 for the top stage races.)	Points	Groupset	Road Bike(s)	Time Trial Bike	Wheels
ALE	Alé–Cipollini	Italy	8	1563	Campagnolo	Cipollini NK1K	Cipollini NKTT	Ursus
VAI	Aromitalia Vaiano	Italy	27	215				
ASA	Astana	Kazakhstan	18	610	Shimano	Argon 18 Gallium Pro	Specialized Shiv	Corima
BPK	Bepink–Cogeas	Italy	11	872	Shimano	Kemo KE-R8	Kemo KE-T5	Ambrosio
BDP	Bizkaia–Durango	Spain	24	346		Orbea		
DLT	Boels–Dolmans	Netherlands	1	4244	SRAM	S-Works Amira; Specialized Tarmac	Specialized Shiv	Zipp
BTC	BTC City Ljubljana	Slovenia	16	754	SRAM	Scott Addict	Scott Plasma	Fulcrum
LPR	Canyon//SRAM	Germany	5	1992	SRAM	Canyon Ultimate WMN CF SLX; Canyon Aeroad CF SLX	Canyon Speedmax CF	Zipp
CBT	Cervélo–Bigla Pro Cycling	Switzerland	7	1684	Shimano/Rotor	Cervélo S5; Cervélo R5	Cervélo P5	Enve
GPC	China Chongming–Liv	Hong Kong	34	65		Giant		
COL	Colavita/Bianchi	United States	36	52	Shimano	Bianchi Oltre XR.1	Bianchi Aquila CV	Vittoria
CPC	Cylance Pro Cycling	United States	9	1406	FSA	Cannondale SuperSix Evo	Cannondale Slice	Vision Wheels
CZG	Conceria Zabri–Fanini–Guerciotti	Albania				Guerciotti		
DRP	Drops	Great Britain	22	449	Shimano	Trek Emonda; Trek Modone	Trek Speed Concept	Bontrager
FDJ	FDJ Nouvelle-Aquitaine Futuroscope	France	15	784	Shimano	Lapierre Xelius	Lapierre Aerostorm	Shimano
GSB	Giusfredi–Bianchi	Italy	38	43		Bianchi		
HBS	Hagens Berman–Supermint	United States	37	46	Shimano	HIA Velo Founder	BH Aerolight	FastForward
HPU	Team Hitec Products	Norway	12	856	Shimano	Scott Addict 15	Scott Plasma	FastForward
LWD	Lares–Waowdeals	Belgium	13	840	Shimano	Merckx Milano 72	Merckx Lugano 68	Edco
LWK	Lensworld–Kuota	Belgium	14	802	Shimano	Kuota Kougar; Kuota Khan	Kuota Kalibur	Miche
LTK	Lointek	Spain	40	16		MM		Nesta
LSL	Lotto–Soudal Ladies	Belgium	17	646	Shimano	Ridley Liz SL	Ridley Dean	FastForward
MCC	Minsk Cycling Club	Belarus	41	13				
ORS	Orica–Scott	Australia	6	1867	Shimano	Scott Foil	Scott Plasma	Shimano/PRO
PVD	Parkhotel Valkenburg–Destil	Netherlands	26	264	Shimano	Carrera Veleno	Massini	FastForward
RLW	Rally Cycling	United States	33	96	SRAM	Diamondback Podium Equipe	Diamondback Serios AF	HED
MIC	S.C. Michela Fanini Rox	Italy	21	497		Orbea Avant M40	Orbea Ordu	Miche
SAS	SAS–Macogep	Canada	28	174		Argon18 Gallium-Pro	Argon18 E-118 Next	
SER	Servetto Giusta	Italy	20	510	Shimano			Vision
T20	Sho-Air Twenty20	United States	25	342	SRAM	Felt Bicycles FR	Felt Bicycles DA	Zipp
SVE	Sport Vlaanderen–Guill D'or	Belgium	31	107				
ILU	Team Illuminate	United States	39	23		S-Works		
SUN	Team Sunweb	Netherlands	4	2480	Shimano	Giant–Liv Envie	Giant Trinity	Shimano
TIB	Tibco–Silicon Valley Bank	United States	19	550	Shimano	Fuji Transonic; Fuji SL; Fuji Supreme	Fuji Norcom Straight	Edco Wheels
TVW	Team VéloCONCEPT	Denmark	10	1013	SRAM	Cervelo S5	Cervelo P5	HED
WNT	Team WNT	Great Britain	30	115	Shimano	Specialized Tarmac	Specialized Shiv	Hope Tech
TWC	Thailand Women's Cycling Team	Thailand	–	–				
TOG	Top Girls Fassa Bortolo	Italy	29	131				
UHC	UnitedHealthcare	United States	23	401	Shimano	Orbea Orca OMR	Orbea Ordu	Shimano
VAL	Valcar–PBM	Italy	41	13		Pinarello Dogma F8; Pinarello Gan		Fulcrum
DNA	Visit Dallas DNA Pro Cycling	United States	32	105	Shimano; FSA	Orbea Orca	Orbea Ordu	Vision
SLP	Weber Shimano Ladies Power	Argentina	35	60				
WHT	Wiggle High5	Great Britain	2	2786	Campagnolo	Colnago C60	Colnago K.Zero	Campagnolo
WM3	WM3 Energie	Netherlands	3	2483	Shimano	Ridley Jane; Ridley Aura	Ridley Dean	Shimano

=== Key ===
Cell colour	Invitation
	Top-15 team, invited to all UCI WWT one-day & stage races automatically
	Top-20 team, invited to all UCI WWT one-day races automatically

== Events ==
The Philadelphia International Cycling Classic was scheduled to be held on 4 June, but was cancelled on 27 January due to "difficulty attracting sponsor financial support".

Races in the 2017 UCI Women's World Tour
Race	Date	Winner	Second	Third	Leader
(Italy) Strade Bianche	4 March	Elisa Longo Borghini (ITA); Wiggle High5	Katarzyna Niewiadoma (POL); Orica–Scott	Lizzie Deignan (GBR); Boels–Dolmans	Elisa Longo Borghini (ITA); Wiggle High5
(Netherlands) Ronde van Drenthe	11 March	Amalie Dideriksen (DEN); Boels–Dolmans	Elena Cecchini (ITA); Canyon//SRAM	Lucinda Brand (NED); Team Sunweb	Elisa Longo Borghini (ITA); Wiggle High5
(Italy) Trofeo Alfredo Binda-Comune di Cittiglio	19 March	Coryn Rivera (USA); Team Sunweb	Arlenis Sierra (CUB); Astana	Cecilie Uttrup Ludwig (DEN); Cervélo–Bigla Pro Cycling	Elisa Longo Borghini (ITA); Wiggle High5
(Belgium) Gent–Wevelgem	26 March	Lotta Lepistö (FIN); Cervélo–Bigla Pro Cycling	Jolien D'Hoore (BEL); Wiggle High5	Coryn Rivera (USA); Team Sunweb	Elisa Longo Borghini (ITA); Wiggle High5
(Belgium) Tour of Flanders	2 April	Coryn Rivera (USA); Team Sunweb	Gracie Elvin (AUS); Orica–Scott	Chantal Blaak (NED); Boels–Dolmans	Coryn Rivera (USA); Team Sunweb
(Netherlands) Amstel Gold Race	16 April	Anna van der Breggen (NED); Boels–Dolmans	Lizzie Deignan (GBR); Boels–Dolmans	Dead heat (Note: Race officials were unable to split Katarzyna Niewiadoma (POL) (Orica–Scott) and Annemiek van Vleuten (NED) (Orica–Scott) in the photo-finish.); Katarzyna Niewiadoma (POL) (Orica–Scott); Annemiek van Vleuten (NED) (Orica–Scott)	Coryn Rivera (USA); Team Sunweb
(Belgium) La Flèche Wallonne	19 April	Anna van der Breggen (NED); Boels–Dolmans	Lizzie Deignan (GBR); Boels–Dolmans	Katarzyna Niewiadoma (POL); Orica–Scott	Coryn Rivera (USA); Team Sunweb
(Belgium) Liège–Bastogne–Liège	23 April	Anna van der Breggen (NED); Boels–Dolmans	Lizzie Deignan (GBR); Boels–Dolmans	Katarzyna Niewiadoma (POL); Orica–Scott	Annemiek van Vleuten (NED); Orica–Scott
(China) Tour of Chongming Island	5–7 May	Jolien D'Hoore (BEL); Wiggle High5	Kirsten Wild (NED); Cylance Pro Cycling	Chloe Hosking (AUS); Alé–Cipollini	Annemiek van Vleuten (NED); Orica–Scott
(United States) Tour of California	11–14 May	Anna van der Breggen (NED); Boels–Dolmans	Katie Hall (USA); UnitedHealthcare	Arlenis Sierra (CUB); Astana	Anna van der Breggen (NED); Boels–Dolmans
(United Kingdom) The Women's Tour	7–11 June	Katarzyna Niewiadoma (POL); Orica–Scott	Christine Majerus (LUX); Boels–Dolmans	Hannah Barnes (GBR); Canyon//SRAM	Katarzyna Niewiadoma (POL); Orica–Scott
(Italy) Giro d'Italia Internazionale Femminile	30 June–9 July	Anna van der Breggen (NED); Boels–Dolmans	Elisa Longo Borghini (ITA); Wiggle High5	Annemiek van Vleuten (NED); Orica–Scott	Anna van der Breggen (NED); Boels–Dolmans
La Course by Le Tour de France	20 July	Annemiek van Vleuten (NED); Orica–Scott	Lizzie Deignan (GBR); Boels–Dolmans	Elisa Longo Borghini (ITA); Wiggle High5	Anna van der Breggen (NED); Boels–Dolmans
(United Kingdom) RideLondon Classique	29 July	Coryn Rivera (USA); Team Sunweb	Lotta Lepistö (FIN); Cervélo–Bigla Pro Cycling	Lisa Brennauer (GER); Canyon//SRAM	Anna van der Breggen (NED); Boels–Dolmans
(Sweden) Crescent Vårgårda Team Time Trial	11 August	Boels–Dolmans	Cervélo–Bigla Pro Cycling	Canyon//SRAM	Anna van der Breggen (NED); Boels–Dolmans
(Sweden) Crescent Vårgårda Road Race	13 August	Lotta Lepistö (FIN); Cervélo–Bigla Pro Cycling	Marianne Vos (NED); Orica–Scott	Leah Kirchmann (CAN); Team Sunweb	Anna van der Breggen (NED); Boels–Dolmans
Ladies Tour of Norway	17–20 August	Marianne Vos (NED); Orica–Scott	Megan Guarnier (USA); Boels–Dolmans	Ellen van Dijk (NED); Team Sunweb	Anna van der Breggen (NED); Boels–Dolmans
(France) GP de Plouay-Lorient Agglomération	26 August	Lizzie Deignan (GBR); Boels–Dolmans	Pauline Ferrand-Prévot (FRA); Canyon//SRAM	Sarah Roy (AUS); Orica–Scott	Anna van der Breggen (NED); Boels–Dolmans
(Netherlands) Holland Ladies Tour	29 August–3 September	Annemiek van Vleuten (NED); Orica–Scott	Anna van der Breggen (NED); Boels–Dolmans	Ellen van Dijk (NED); Team Sunweb	Anna van der Breggen (NED); Boels–Dolmans
(Spain) Madrid Challenge by la Vuelta	10 September	Jolien D'Hoore (BEL); Wiggle High5	Coryn Rivera (USA); Team Sunweb	Roxane Fournier (FRA); FDJ Nouvelle-Aquitaine Futuroscope	Anna van der Breggen (NED); Boels–Dolmans

== Final points standings ==
=== Individual ===
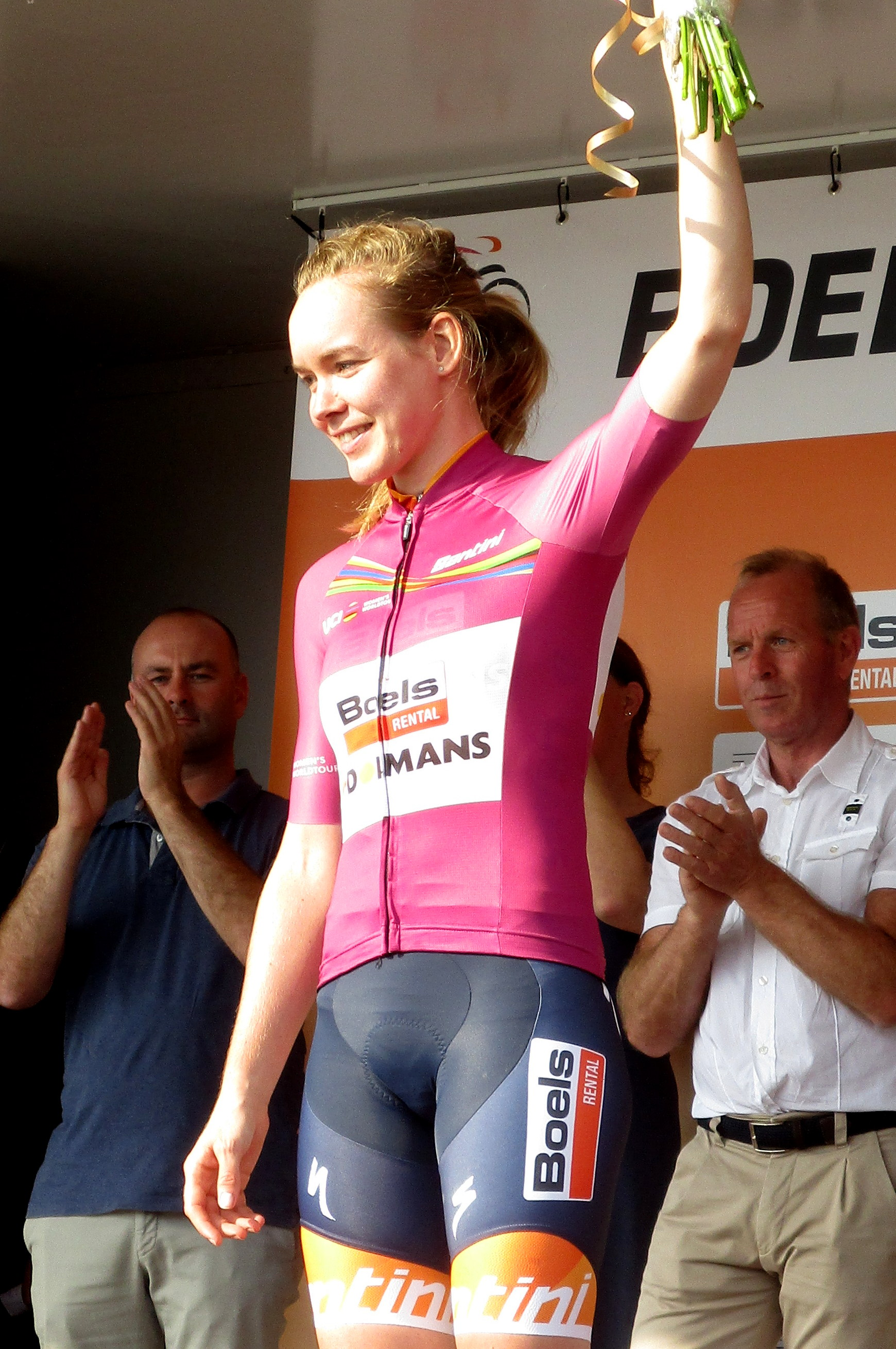
Anna van der Breggen (pictured at the Holland Ladies Tour), the winner of the individual classification.

Riders tied with the same number of points were classified by number of victories, then number of second places, third places, and so on, in World Tour events and stages.

Individual rankings
Rank	Name	Team	Points
1	Anna van der Breggen (NED)	Boels–Dolmans	1016
2	Annemiek van Vleuten (NED)	Orica–Scott	989
3	Katarzyna Niewiadoma (POL)	WM3 Energie	856
4	Coryn Rivera (USA)	Team Sunweb	803
5	Elisa Longo Borghini (ITA)	Wiggle High5	630
6	Jolien D'Hoore (BEL)	Wiggle High5	626
7	Lizzie Deignan (GBR)	Boels–Dolmans	623
8	Ellen van Dijk (NED)	Team Sunweb	614
9	Lotta Lepistö (FIN)	Cervélo–Bigla Pro Cycling	518
10	Chloe Hosking (AUS)	Alé–Cipollini	457
11	Marianne Vos (NED)	WM3 Energie	452
12	Megan Guarnier (USA)	Boels–Dolmans	429
13	Elena Cecchini (ITA)	Canyon//SRAM	427
14	Chantal Blaak (NED)	Boels–Dolmans	373
15	Kirsten Wild (NED)	Cylance Pro Cycling	347
16	Arlenis Sierra (CUB)	Astana	334
17	Lisa Brennauer (GER)	Canyon//SRAM	321
18	Christine Majerus (LUX)	Boels–Dolmans	320
19	Shara Gillow (AUS)	FDJ Nouvelle-Aquitaine Futuroscope	320
20	Ashleigh Moolman (RSA)	Cervélo–Bigla Pro Cycling	303
202 riders scored points

=== Youth ===
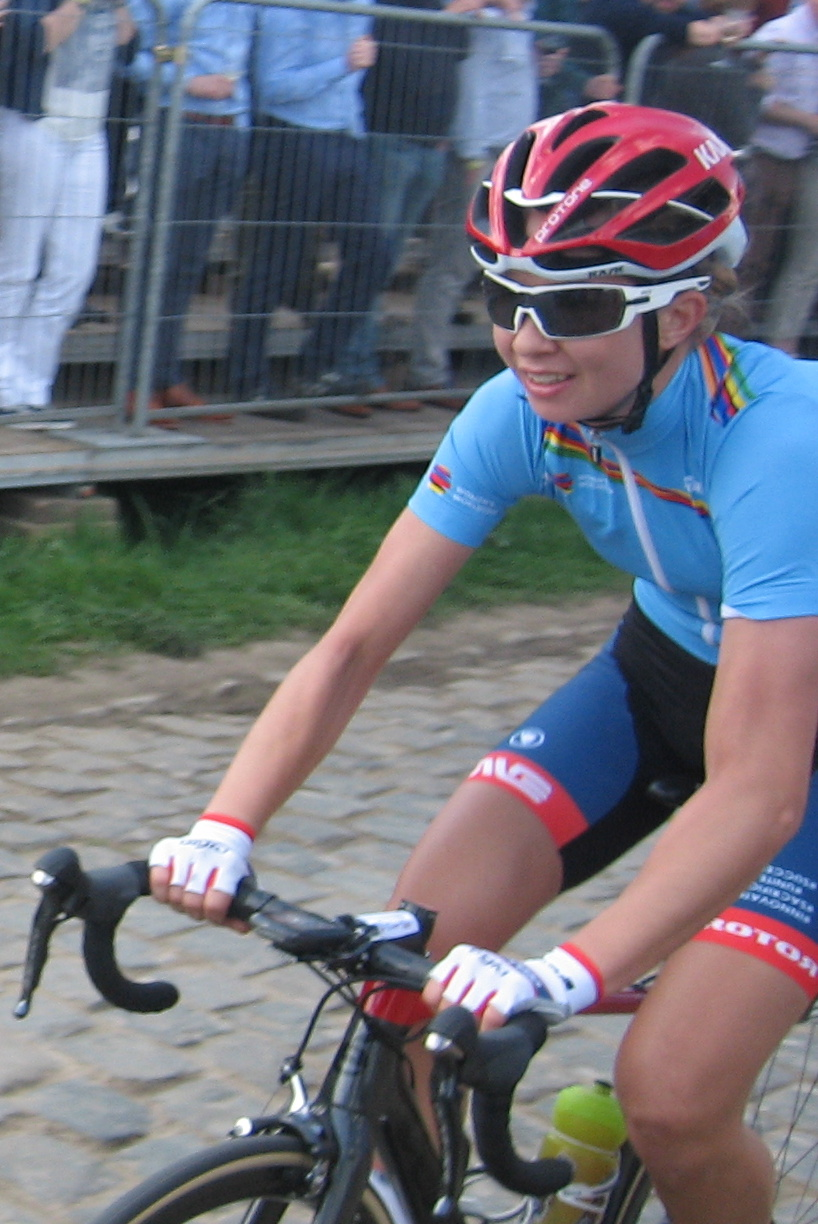
Cecilie Uttrup Ludwig (pictured at the Tour of Flanders), the winner of the youth classification.

The top three riders in the final results of each World Tour event's young rider classification received points towards the standings. Six points were awarded to first place, four points to second place and two points to third place.

Youth rankings
Rank	Name	Team	Points
1	Cecilie Uttrup Ludwig (DEN)	Cervélo–Bigla Pro Cycling	52
2	Alice Barnes (GBR)	Drops	16
3	Amalie Dideriksen (DEN)	Boels–Dolmans	16
4	Susanne Andersen (NOR)	Team Hitec Products	12
5	Lisa Klein (GER)	Cervélo–Bigla Pro Cycling	12
6	Lotte Kopecky (BEL)	Lotto–Soudal Ladies	12
7	Anna Christian (GBR)	Drops	10
8	Demi de Jong (NED)	Parkhotel Valkenburg–Destil	8
9	Nikola Nosková (CZE)	Bepink–Cogeas	8
10	Sofia Beggin (ITA)	Astana	8
11	Juliette Labous (FRA)	Team Sunweb	8
12	Floortje Mackaij (NED)	Team Sunweb	8
13	Sofia Bertizzolo (ITA)	Astana	8
14	Maria Vittoria Sperotto (ITA)	Bepink–Cogeas	6
15	Alba Teruel Ribes (ESP)	Lointek	4
16	Pernille Mathiesen (DEN)	Team VéloCONCEPT	4
17	Liane Lippert (GER)	Team Sunweb	4
18	Jeanne Korevaar (NED)	WM3 Energie	4
19	Anastasiia Iakovenko (RUS)	Russia (national team)	4
20	Arianna Fidanza (ITA)	Astana	4
28 riders scored points

=== Team ===
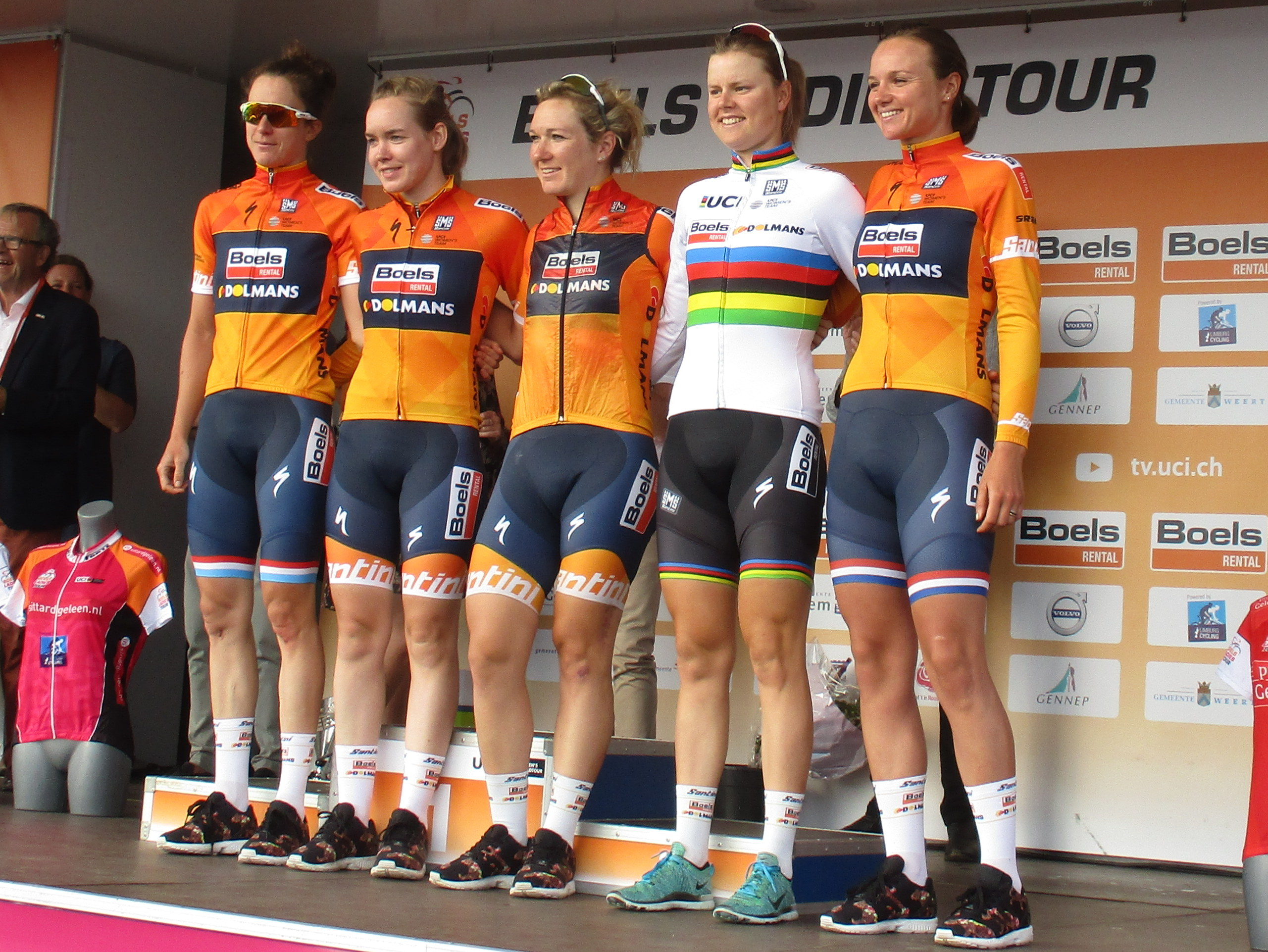
Boels–Dolmans (members of the team pictured at the Holland Ladies Tour), the winners of the teams classification.

Team rankings were calculated by adding the ranking points of the top four riders of a team in each race, plus points gained in the Crescent Vårgårda UCI Women's WorldTour TTT.

Team classification
Rank	Team	STR	RON	TRO	GEN	FLA	AGR	LFW	LBL	CHO	TOC	OWT	GIR	LAC	RID	TTT	VAR	NOR	PLO	HOL	MAD	Points
1	Boels–Dolmans	97	184	70	35	115	280	220	238		219	221	478	174	42	140	86	225	124	325		3273
2	Team Sunweb	72	103	124	85	126	75	50	98		117	214	177	26	138	80	155	220		163	130	2153
3	Wiggle High5	140	120	30	100	25	78	34	54	221	43	116	299	85	75	64	35	77	12	46	170	1824
4	Orica–Scott	135	60	70	34	170	85	100	60	104		35	297	170	28		8	140	91	234		1821
5	Canyon//SRAM	25	116	62	102	70	35				83	191	103	10	123	100	36	63	160	226		1505
6	WM3 Energie	108	40	35	12	35	85	85	93	4		219	126	30	76	56	116	218		76		1414
7	Cervélo–Bigla Pro Cycling	36	18	110	120	32	34	76	75			107	87	26	100	120	120	147	20			1228
8	Alé–Cipollini	16	25		72	30	14	35	20	177		61	105	16	20	28	90	87	14	126	40	976 (Note: Listed on 994 points by UCI, due to all six riders being attributed points for the Giro d'Italia Femminile.)
9	Cylance Pro Cycling	10	2	12	25	2		2		165	130	38	43	2	60	32	25	10	80	65	60	763
10	FDJ Nouvelle-Aquitaine Futuroscope	50	4	8			18	60	40			28	66	80	35	52		12	24	90	95	662
11	BTC City Ljubljana	14		56				22		106			32	31	16	44	6		97		88	512
12	Astana	18		100	6					28	149		97									398
13	Lensworld–Kuota			10	68	20	16	16	4			10	60			16	30			50		300
14	Team VéloCONCEPT									74		20			12	60		24		88		278
15	UnitedHealthcare										259											259
16	Tibco–Silicon Valley Bank	4								22	114			40					75			255
17	Drops		35		40				6		34	88				20			18		4	245
18	Team Hitec Products		6	14					2	72		16	26			48	18	6			35	243
19	Bepink–Cogeas				16				35	74		4	32			36		14	10		2	223
20	Lotto–Soudal Ladies				10	60										24					20	114
36 teams scored points
