= 2017 Strade Bianche Women =

2017 Strade Bianche Donne
2017 UCI Women's World Tour, race 1 of 20

Race details
- Dates: 4 March 2017
- Stages: 1
- Distance: 127 km (79 mi)
- Winning time: 3h 44' 45"

Results
	Winner	Elisa Longo Borghini (ITA)	(Wiggle High5)
	Second	Katarzyna Niewiadoma (POL)	(WM3 Energie)
	Third	Lizzie Deignan (GBR)	(Boels–Dolmans)

UCI Report

The third edition of the women's Strade Bianche was held on 4 March 2017, in Tuscany, Italy. Elisa Longo Borghini won the race, in bad weather, ahead of Katarzyna Niewiadoma and the previous year's champion, Lizzie Deignan.

The women's Strade Bianche served as the first event of the second UCI Women's World Tour, the highest level of professional women's cycling. The race is organized on the same day as the men's event, at a shorter distance, but on much of the same roads.

== Results ==
Result
Rank	Rider	Team	Time
1	Elisa Longo Borghini (ITA)	Wiggle High5	3h 44' 45"
2	Katarzyna Niewiadoma (POL)	WM3 Energie	+ 2"
3	Lizzie Deignan (GBR)	Boels–Dolmans	+ 5"
4	Lucinda Brand (NED)	Team Sunweb	+ 8"
5	Annemiek van Vleuten (NED)	Orica–Scott	+ 9"
6	Shara Gillow (AUS)	FDJ Nouvelle-Aquitaine Futuroscope	+ 12"
7	Katrin Garfoot (AUS)	Orica–Scott	+ 18"
8	Amanda Spratt (AUS)	Orica–Scott	+ 36"
9	Cecilie Uttrup Ludwig (DEN)	Cervélo–Bigla Pro Cycling	+ 1' 06"
10	Elena Cecchini (ITA)	Canyon//SRAM	+ 1' 06"

== See also ==
- 2017 in women's road cycling
- 2017 UCI Women's World Tour
