= 2017 Giro d'Italia Femminile =

2017 Giro d'Italia Internazionale Femminile
2017 UCI Women's World Tour, race 12 of 20
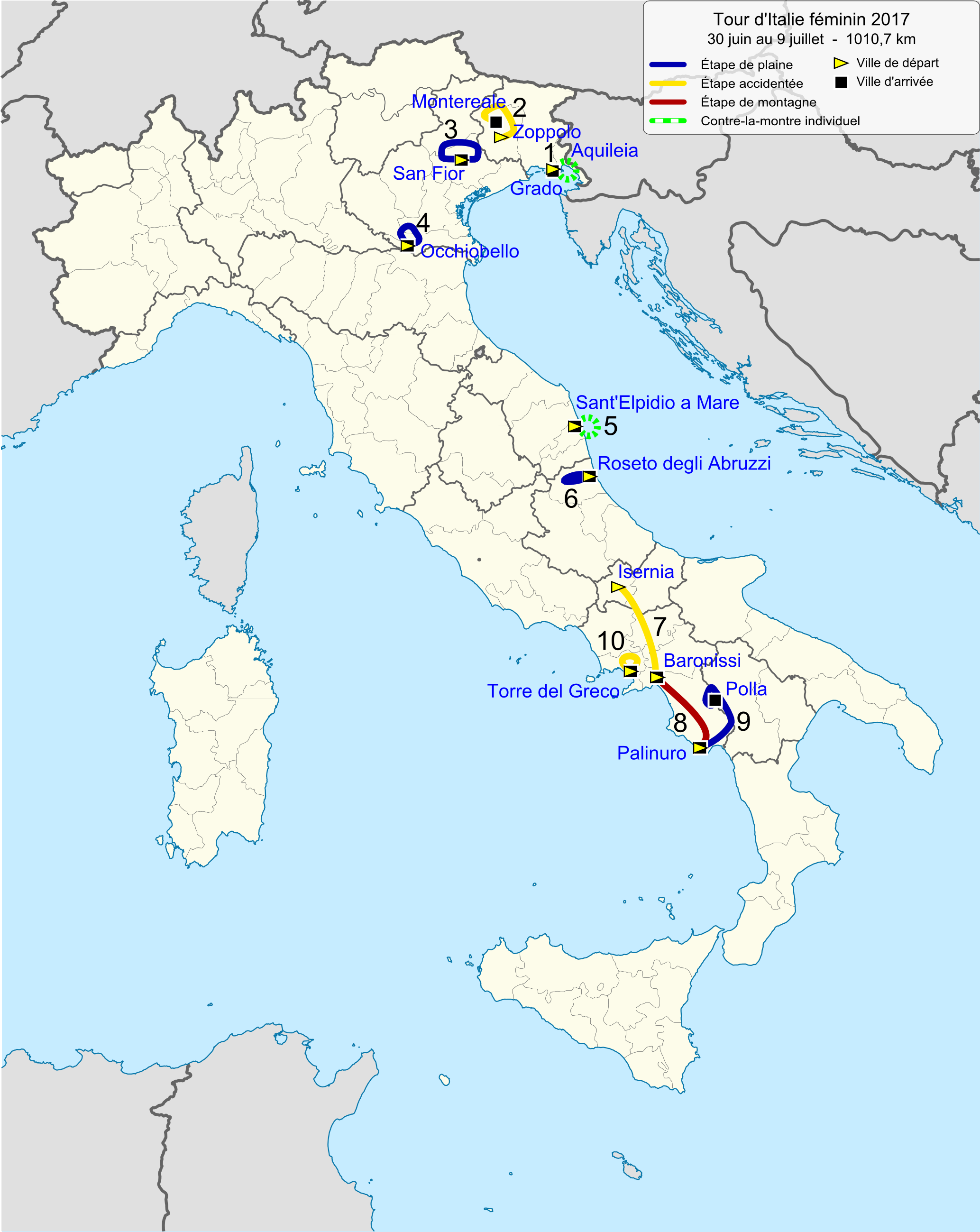
- Route of the 2017 Giro d'Italia Internazionale Femminile

Race details
- Dates: 30 June – 9 July 2017
- Stages: 10
- Distance: 1,010.66 km (628.00 mi)
- Winning time: 25h 39' 43"

Results
| Jersey awarded to the overall winner | Winner | Anna van der Breggen (NED) | (Boels–Dolmans) |
| | Second | Elisa Longo Borghini (ITA) | (Wiggle High5) |
| | Third | Annemiek van Vleuten (NED) | (Orica–Scott) |
| Jersey awarded to the points classification winner | Points | Annemiek van Vleuten (NED) | (Orica–Scott) |
| Jersey awarded to the mountains classification winner | Mountains | Annemiek van Vleuten (NED) | (Orica–Scott) |
| Jersey awarded to the youth classification winner | Youth | Cecilie Uttrup Ludwig (DEN) | (Cervélo–Bigla Pro Cycling) |
| | Team | Boels–Dolmans | |

The 2017 Giro d'Italia Femminile, or 2017 Giro Rosa, was the 28th running of the Giro d'Italia Femminile, the only remaining women's Grand Tour at the time. It was held between 30 June and 9 July 2017 as the most prestigious stage race of both the 2017 UCI Women's World Tour and the women's calendar.

The race was won for the second time in three years by Olympic and European champion Anna van der Breggen (Boels–Dolmans) from the Netherlands, who took the leader's pink jersey after the second stage and maintained the lead for the remainder of the race, taking the overall lead of the UCI Women's World Tour standings in the process. Van der Breggen triumphed in the race overall by 63 seconds from the highest-placed Italian rider Elisa Longo Borghini, of the Wiggle High5 team.

The podium was completed by Orica–Scott's Annemiek van Vleuten, who was a further 36 seconds behind Longo Borghini; van Vleuten, also from the Netherlands, had the best all-around performance among the overall contenders, winning two stages and two jerseys – the points classification and also the mountains classification. Danish rider Cecilie Uttrup Ludwig (Cervélo–Bigla Pro Cycling) extended her lead in the youth classification of the overall Women's World Tour standings by winning the race's young rider classification, while van der Breggen's Boels–Dolmans team were the winners of the team classification, after also placing defending race winner Megan Guarnier and Karol-Ann Canuel – the only other rider to wear the pink jersey, having done so after the opening stage team time trial – inside the top ten overall.

== Teams ==
24 teams participated in the 2017 Giro d'Italia Femminile. The top 15 UCI Women's World Tour teams were automatically invited, and obliged to attend the race.

Competing teams

- Alé–Cipollini
- Aromitalia Vaiano
- Astana
- Bepink–Cogeas
- Boels–Dolmans
- BTC City Ljubljana
- Canyon//SRAM
- Cervélo–Bigla Pro Cycling
- Conceria Zabri–Fanini–Guerciotti
- Cylance Pro Cycling
- FDJ Nouvelle-Aquitaine Futuroscope
- Giusfredi–Bianchi
- Team Hitec Products
- Lares–Waowdeals
- Lensworld–Kuota
- S.C. Michela Fanini Rox
- Orica–Scott
- Servetto Giusta
- Team Sunweb
- Top Girls Fassa Bortolo
- Valcar–PBM
- Wiggle High5
- WM3 Energie
- Team Virtu Cycling

== Route ==
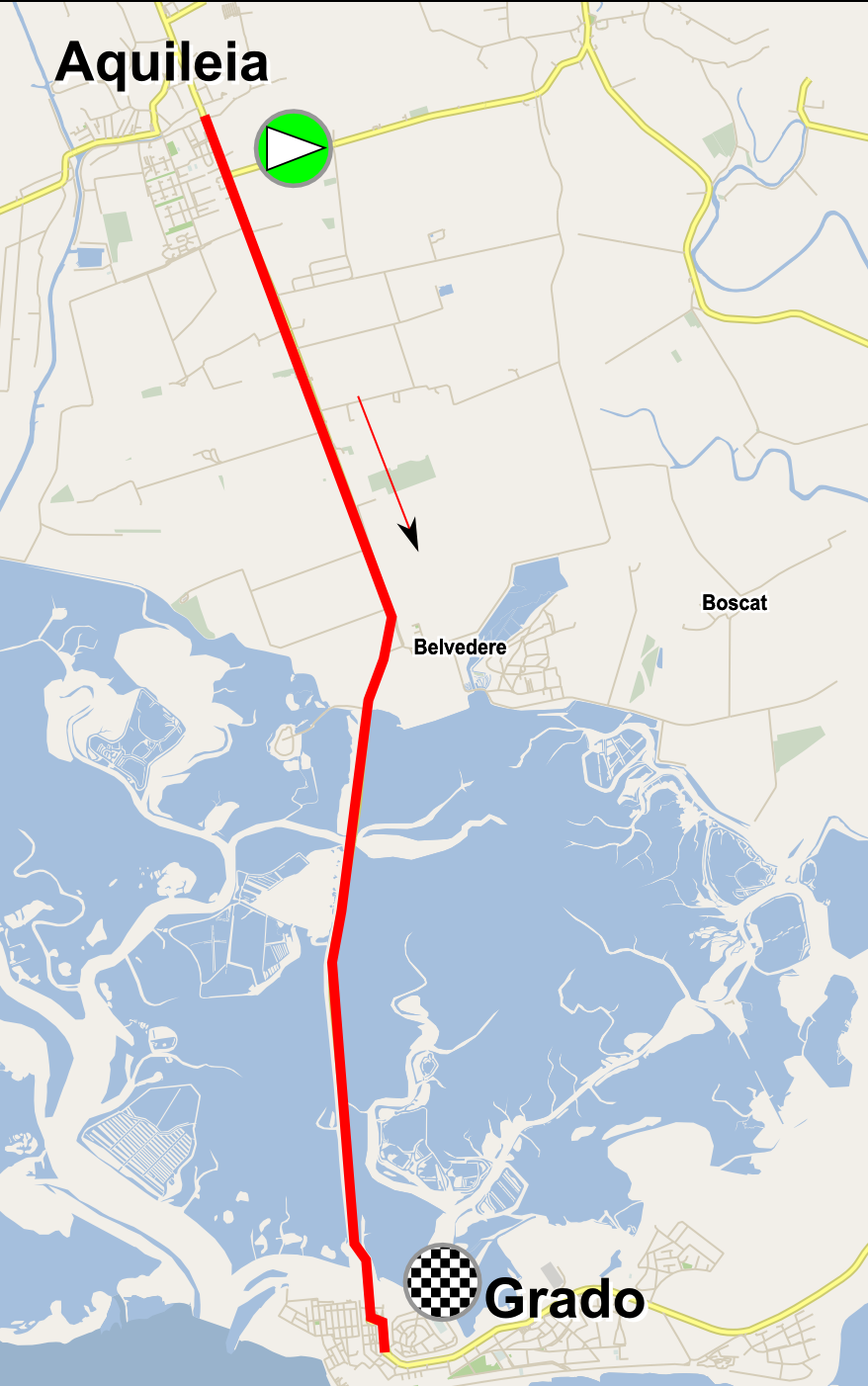
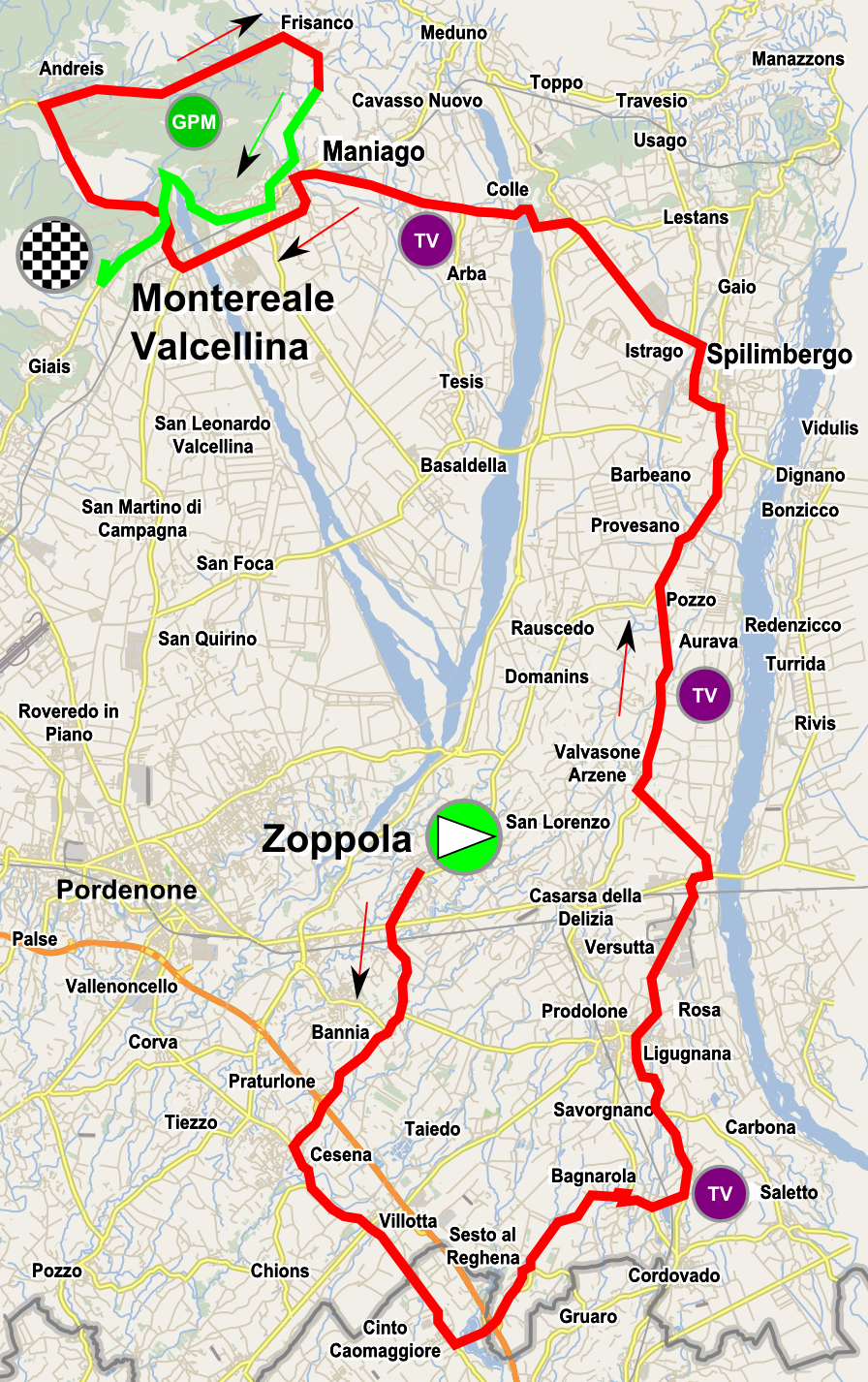
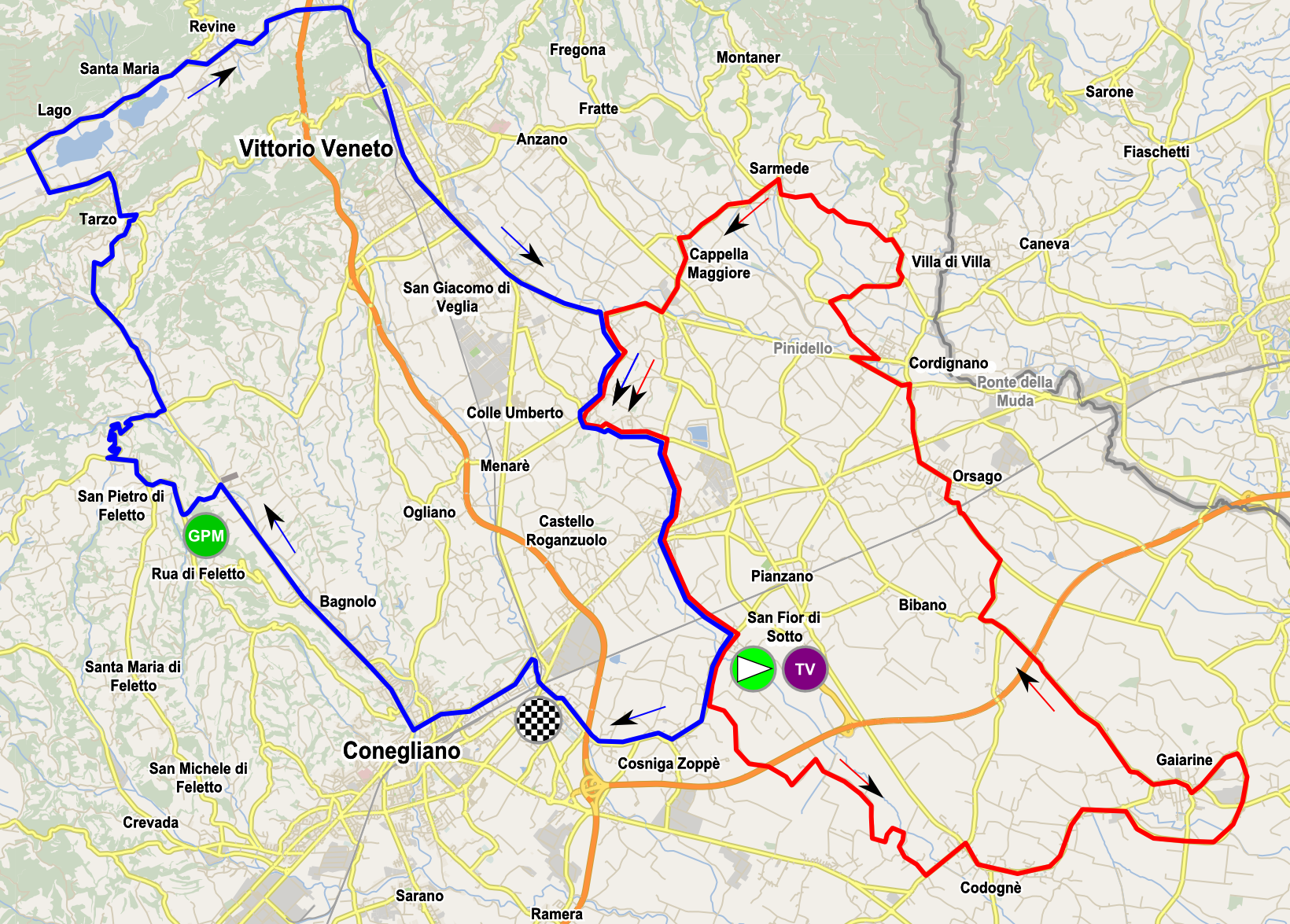
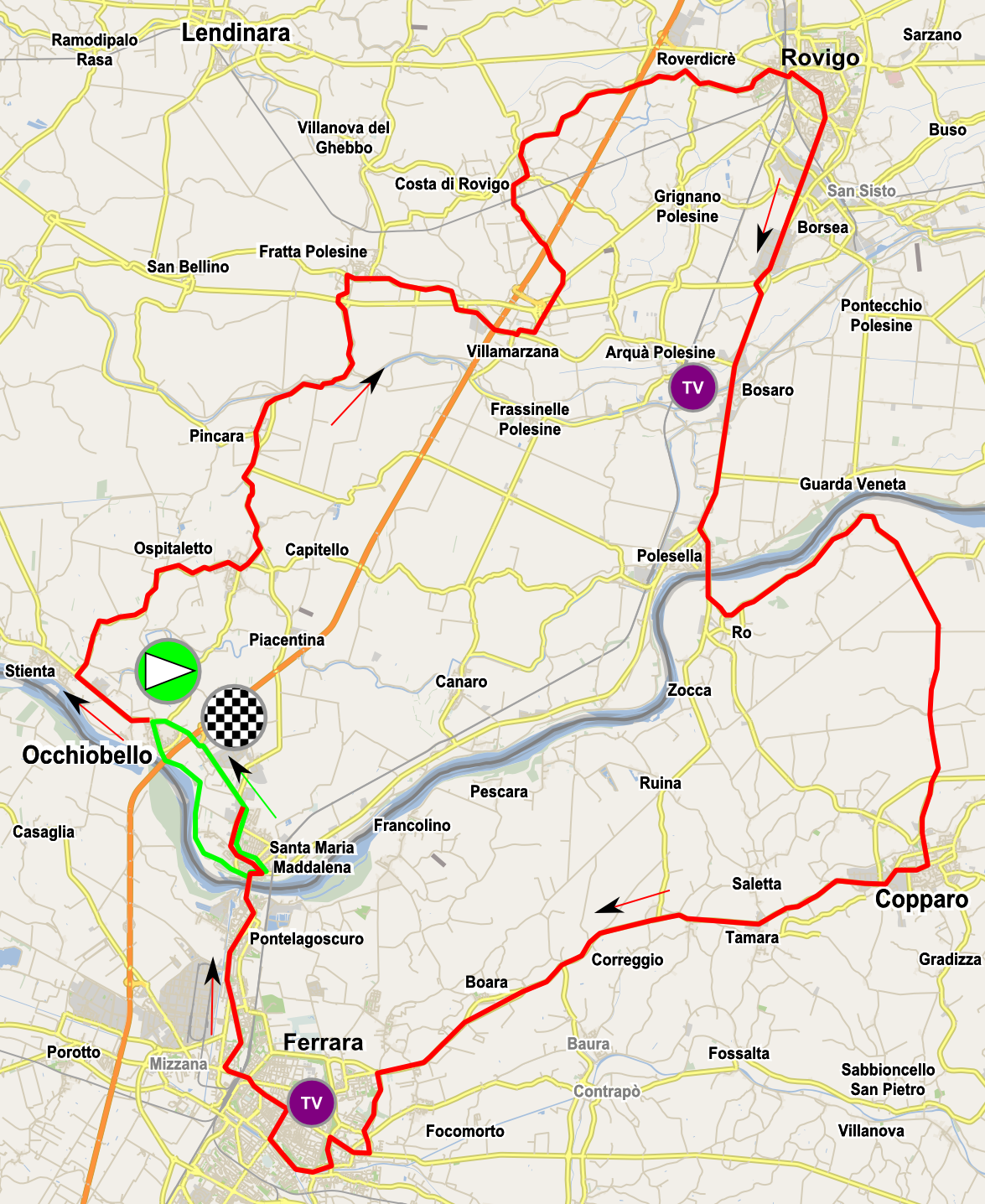
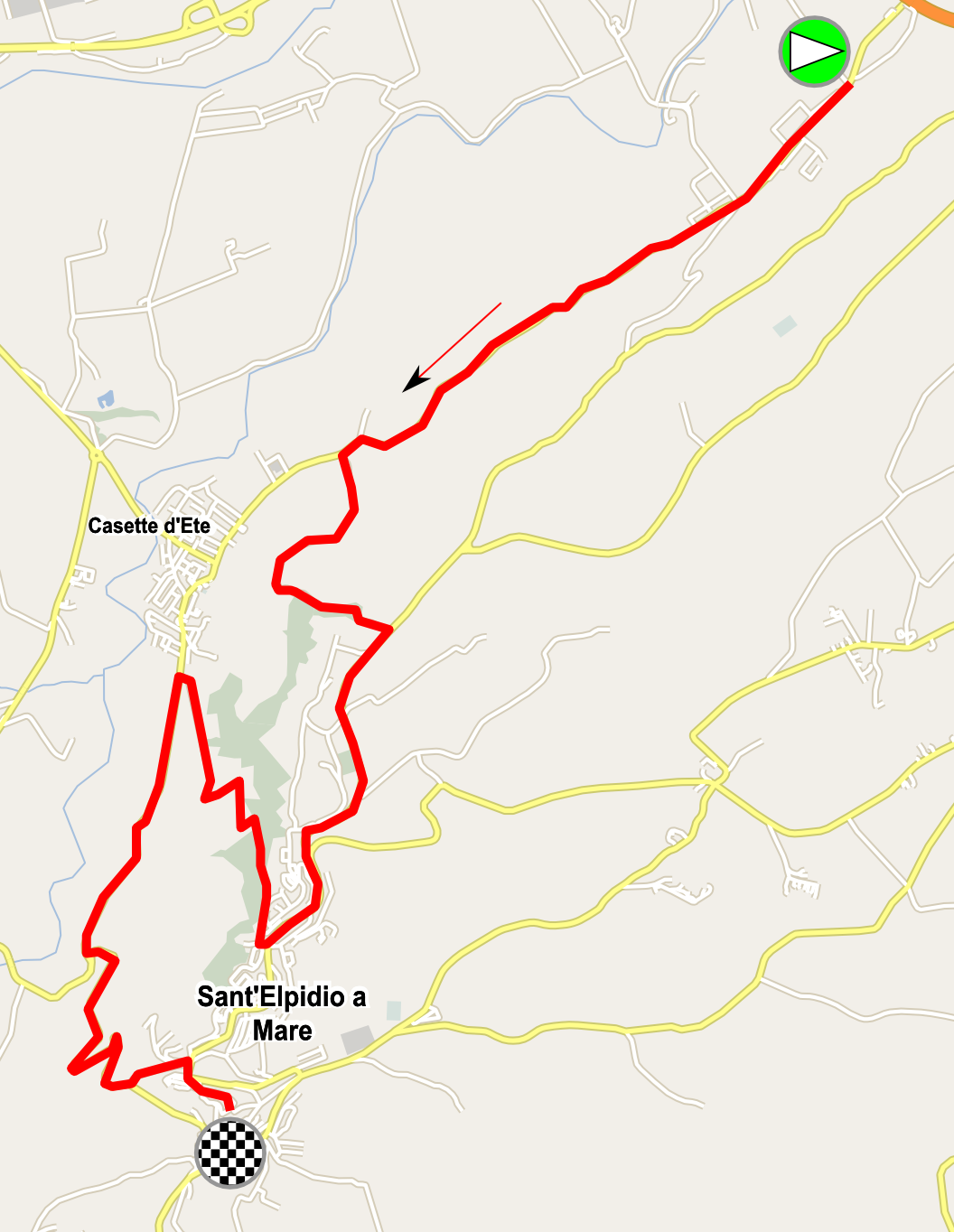
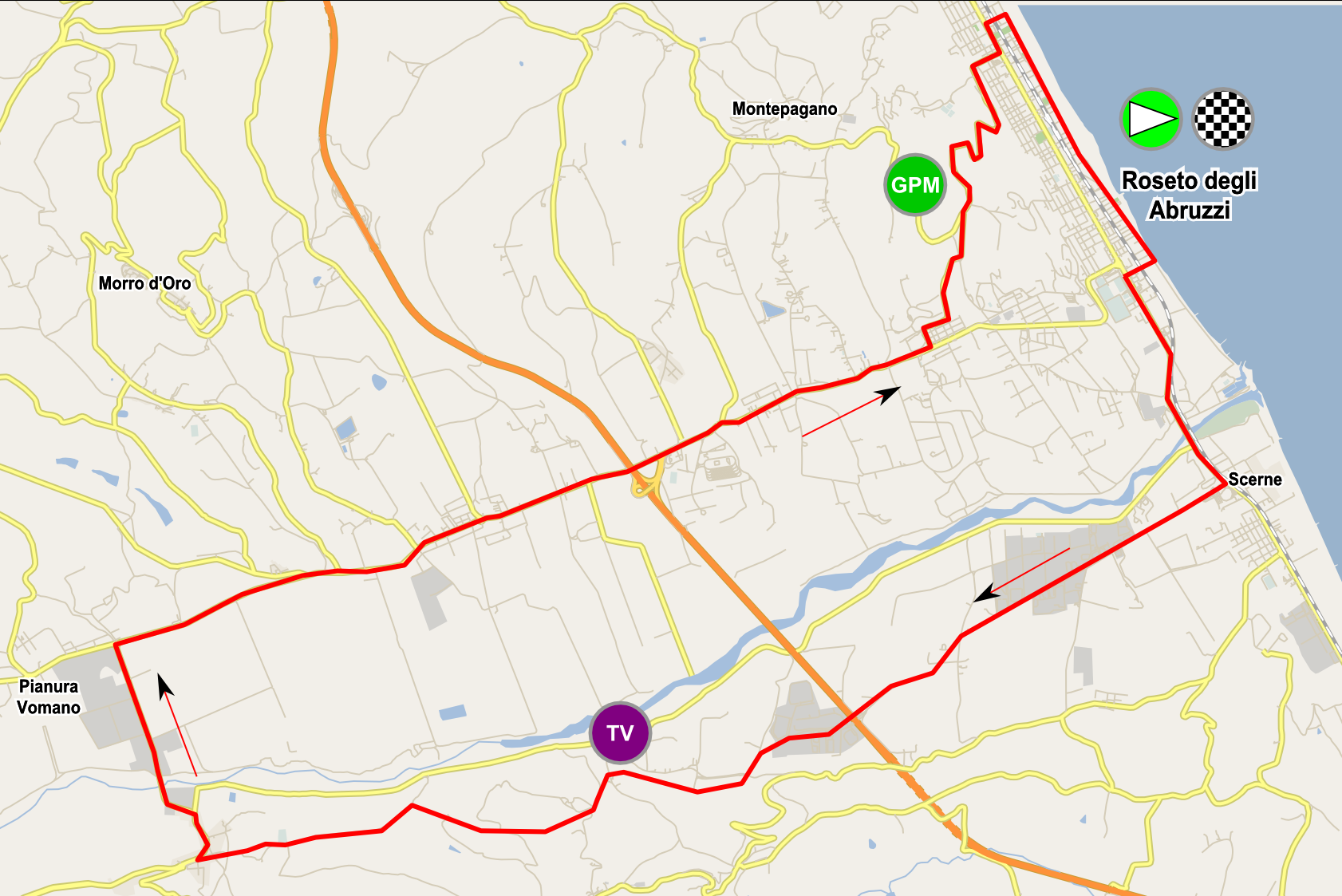
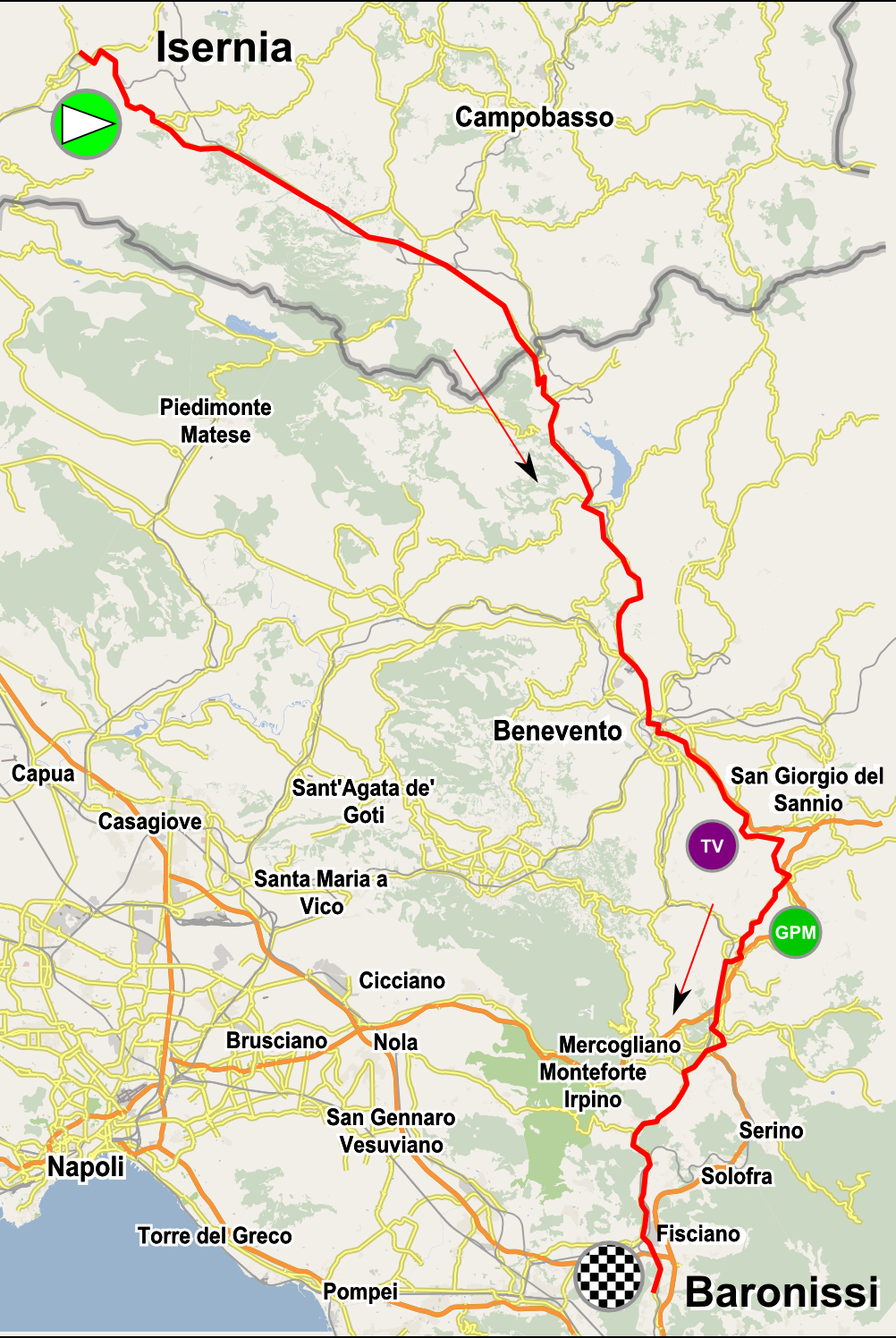
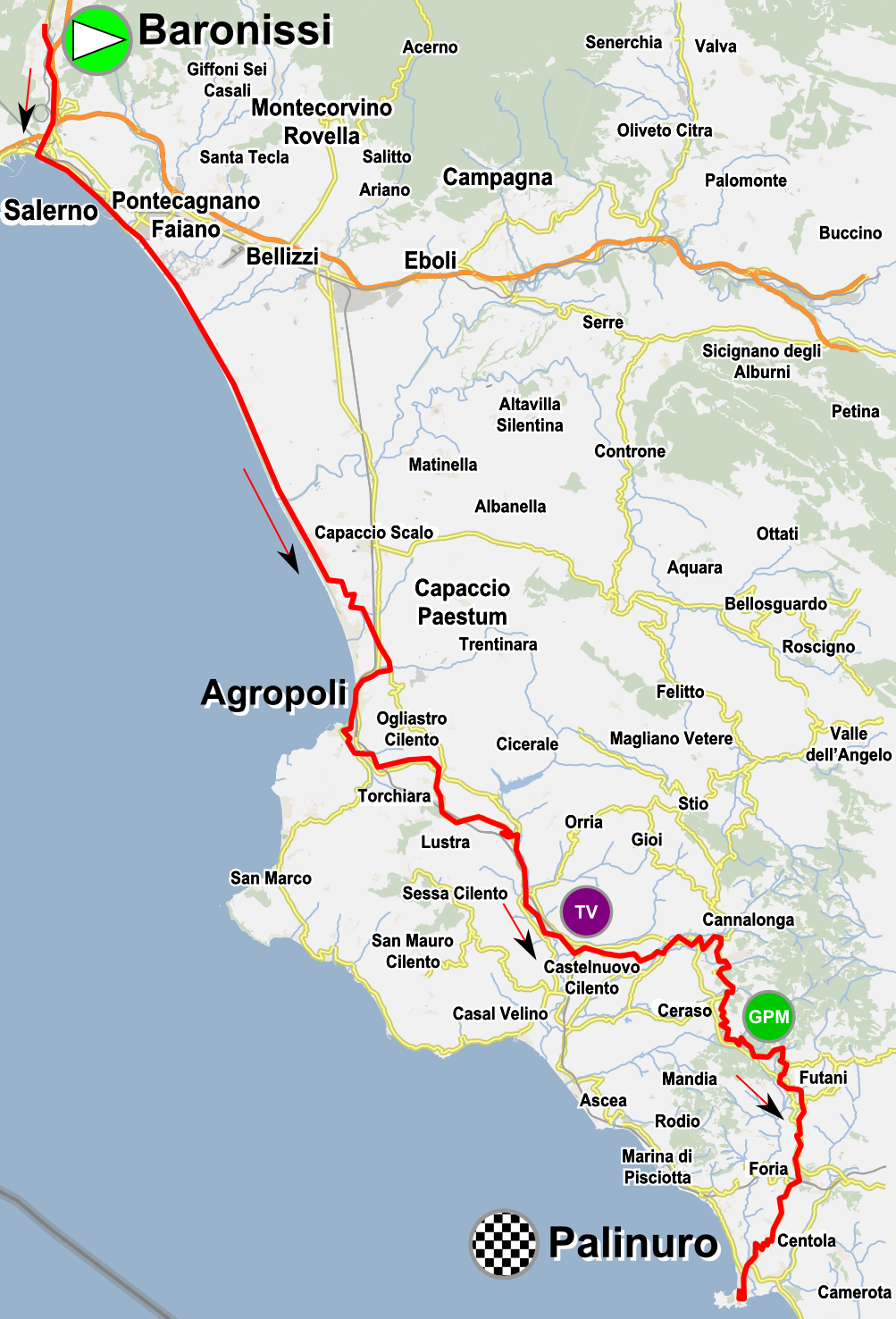
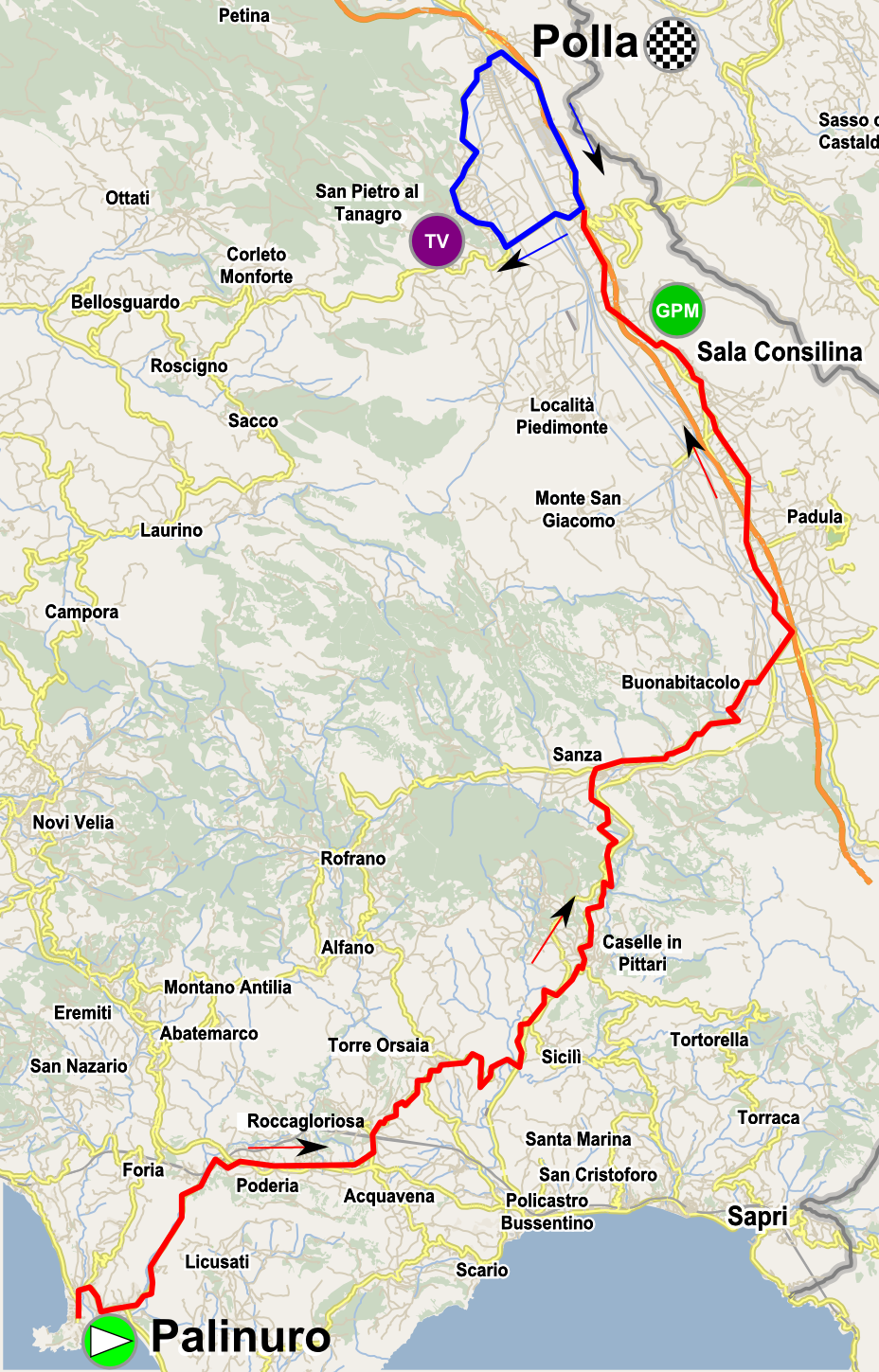
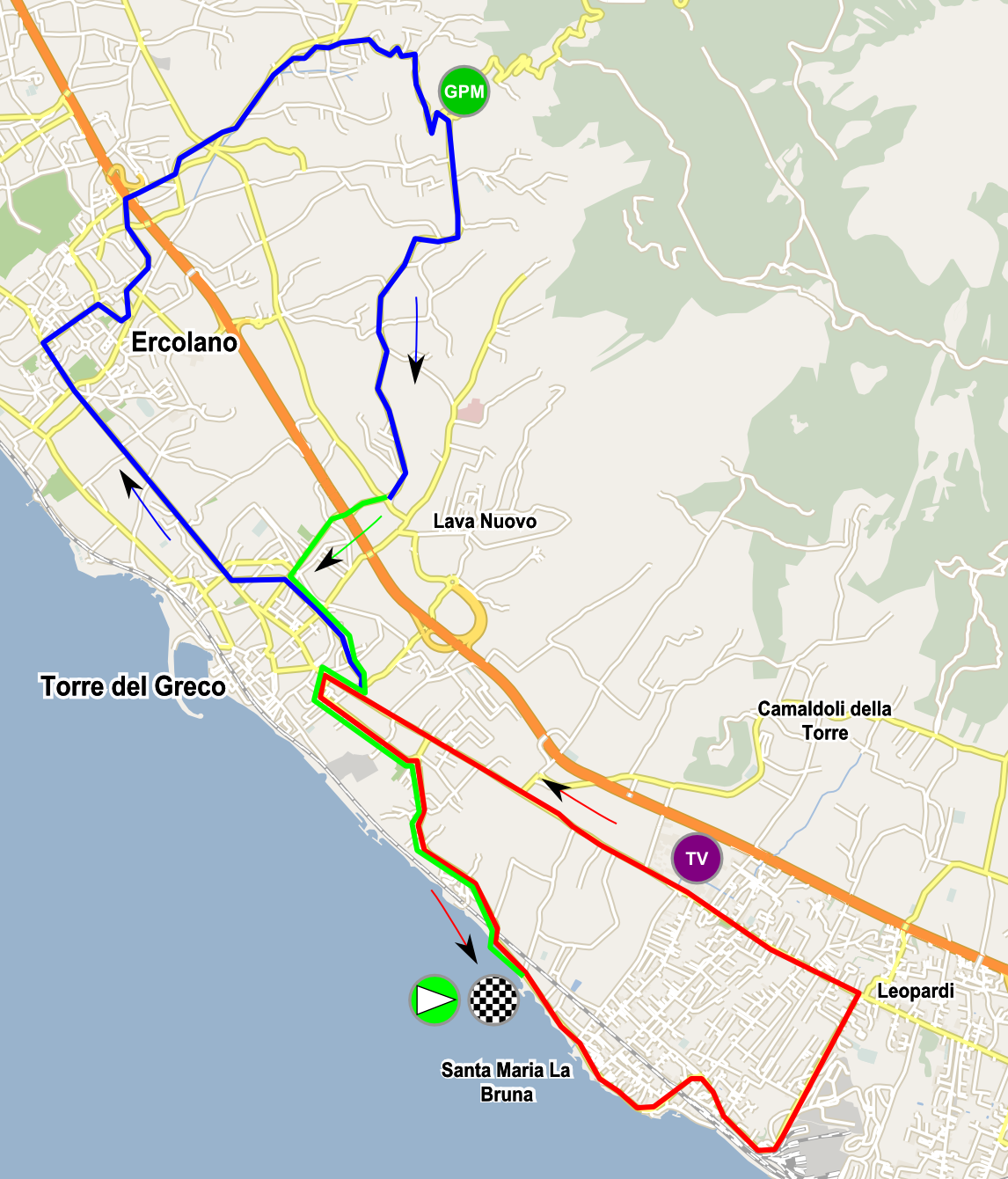
The individual stage profiles of the 2017 Giro d'Italia Femminile; top row (stages 1 to 5) and bottom row (stages 6 to 10).

The route for the 2017 Giro d'Italia Femminile was announced on 12 April 2017. The total race distance of 1,010 km (630 mi) was the longest since the 2001 edition, with the previous 15 editions of the race all under 1,000 kilometres (620 mi) in length.

Stage schedule
| Stage | Date | Course | Distance | Type | Winner |
|---|---|---|---|---|---|
| 1 | 30 June | Aquileia to Grado | 11.5 km (7.1 mi) | Team time trial | Boels–Dolmans |
| 2 | 1 July | Zoppola to Montereale Valcellina | 122.25 km (76.0 mi) | Hilly stage | Annemiek van Vleuten (NED) |
| 3 | 2 July | San Fior to San Vendemiano | 102.5 km (63.7 mi) | Flat stage | Hannah Barnes (GBR) |
| 4 | 3 July | Occhiobello to Occhiobello | 118 km (73.3 mi) | Flat stage | Jolien D'Hoore (BEL) |
| 5 | 4 July | Sant'Elpidio a Mare to Sant'Elpidio a Mare | 12.73 km (7.9 mi) | Individual time trial | Annemiek van Vleuten (NED) |
| 6 | 5 July | Roseto degli Abruzzi to Roseto degli Abruzzi | 116.16 km (72.2 mi) | Flat stage | Lotta Lepistö (FIN) |
| 7 | 6 July | Isernia to Baronissi | 145.48 km (90.4 mi) | Flat stage | Sheyla Gutiérrez (ESP) |
| 8 | 7 July | Baronissi to Palinuro | 139.2 km (86.5 mi) | Mountain stage | Lucinda Brand (NED) |
| 9 | 8 July | Palinuro to Polla | 116.8 km (72.6 mi) | Flat stage | Marta Bastianelli (ITA) |
| 10 | 9 July | Torre del Greco to Torre del Greco | 124 km (77.1 mi) | Hilly stage | Megan Guarnier (USA) |

== Stages ==
=== Stage 1 ===
30 June 2017 — Aquileia to Grado, 11.5 km (7.1 mi), team time trial (TTT)

Result of Stage 1
| Rank | Team | Time |
|---|---|---|
| 1 | Boels–Dolmans | 14' 47" |
| 2 | Team Sunweb | + 19" |
| 3 | Orica–Scott | + 22" |
| 4 | Wiggle High5 | + 24" |
| 5 | Canyon//SRAM | + 36" |
| 6 | WM3 Energie | + 37" |
| 7 | Astana | + 51" |
| 8 | Cervélo–Bigla Pro Cycling | + 52" |
| 9 | Lensworld–Kuota | + 1' 04" |
| 10 | FDJ Nouvelle-Aquitaine Futuroscope | + 1' 06" |

General classification after Stage 1
| Rank | Rider | Team | Time |
|---|---|---|---|
| 1 | Karol-Ann Canuel (CAN) | Boels–Dolmans | 14' 47" |
| 2 | Megan Guarnier (USA) | Boels–Dolmans | + 0" |
| 3 | Amalie Dideriksen (DEN) | Boels–Dolmans | + 0" |
| 4 | Chantal Blaak (NED) | Boels–Dolmans | + 0" |
| 5 | Anna van der Breggen (NED) | Boels–Dolmans | + 0" |
| 6 | Lizzie Deignan (GBR) | Boels–Dolmans | + 0" |
| 7 | Lucinda Brand (NED) | Team Sunweb | + 19" |
| 8 | Coryn Rivera (USA) | Team Sunweb | + 19" |
| 9 | Floortje Mackaij (NED) | Team Sunweb | + 19" |
| 10 | Sabrina Stultiens (NED) | Team Sunweb | + 19" |

=== Stage 2 ===
1 July 2017 — Zoppola to Montereale Valcellina, 122.25 km (76.0 mi)

Result of Stage 2
| Rank | Rider | Team | Time |
|---|---|---|---|
| 1 | Annemiek van Vleuten (NED) | Orica–Scott | 3h 11' 51" |
| 2 | Anna van der Breggen (NED) | Boels–Dolmans | + 0" |
| 3 | Elisa Longo Borghini (ITA) | Wiggle High5 | + 0" |
| 4 | Katarzyna Niewiadoma (POL) | WM3 Energie | + 1' 54" |
| 5 | Megan Guarnier (USA) | Boels–Dolmans | + 1' 54" |
| 6 | Shara Gillow (AUS) | FDJ Nouvelle-Aquitaine Futuroscope | + 1' 54" |
| 7 | Amanda Spratt (AUS) | Orica–Scott | + 1' 54" |
| 8 | Yevheniya Vysotska (UKR) | Conceria Zabri–Fanini–Guerciotti | + 1' 59" |
| 9 | Lucinda Brand (NED) | Team Sunweb | + 2' 37" |
| 10 | Arlenis Sierra (CUB) | Astana | + 2' 37" |

General classification after Stage 2
| Rank | Rider | Team | Time |
|---|---|---|---|
| 1 | Anna van der Breggen (NED) | Boels–Dolmans | 3h 26' 32" |
| 2 | Annemiek van Vleuten (NED) | Orica–Scott | + 18" |
| 3 | Elisa Longo Borghini (ITA) | Wiggle High5 | + 26" |
| 4 | Megan Guarnier (USA) | Boels–Dolmans | + 2' 00" |
| 5 | Amanda Spratt (AUS) | Orica–Scott | + 2' 22" |
| 6 | Katarzyna Niewiadoma (POL) | WM3 Energie | + 2' 37" |
| 7 | Karol-Ann Canuel (CAN) | Boels–Dolmans | + 2' 43" |
| 8 | Lizzie Deignan (GBR) | Boels–Dolmans | + 2' 50" |
| 9 | Lucinda Brand (NED) | Team Sunweb | + 3' 02" |
| 10 | Floortje Mackaij (NED) | Team Sunweb | + 3' 02" |

=== Stage 3 ===
2 July 2017 — San Fior to San Vendemiano, 102.5 km (63.7 mi)

Result of Stage 3
| Rank | Rider | Team | Time |
|---|---|---|---|
| 1 | Hannah Barnes (GBR) | Canyon//SRAM | 2h 27' 49" |
| 2 | Lotta Lepistö (FIN) | Cervélo–Bigla Pro Cycling | + 0" |
| 3 | Kirsten Wild (NED) | Cylance Pro Cycling | + 0" |
| 4 | Roxane Fournier (FRA) | FDJ Nouvelle-Aquitaine Futuroscope | + 0" |
| 5 | Amalie Dideriksen (DEN) | Boels–Dolmans | + 0" |
| 6 | Chloe Hosking (AUS) | Alé–Cipollini | + 0" |
| 7 | Emilie Moberg (NOR) | Team Hitec Products | + 0" |
| 8 | Giorgia Bronzini (ITA) | Wiggle High5 | + 0" |
| 9 | Maria Giulia Confalonieri (ITA) | Lensworld–Kuota | + 0" |
| 10 | Ilaria Sanguineti (ITA) | Bepink–Cogeas | + 0" |

General classification after Stage 3
| Rank | Rider | Team | Time |
|---|---|---|---|
| 1 | Anna van der Breggen (NED) | Boels–Dolmans | 5h 54' 21" |
| 2 | Annemiek van Vleuten (NED) | Orica–Scott | + 18" |
| 3 | Elisa Longo Borghini (ITA) | Wiggle High5 | + 26" |
| 4 | Megan Guarnier (USA) | Boels–Dolmans | + 2' 00" |
| 5 | Amanda Spratt (AUS) | Orica–Scott | + 2' 22" |
| 6 | Katarzyna Niewiadoma (POL) | WM3 Energie | + 2' 37" |
| 7 | Karol-Ann Canuel (CAN) | Boels–Dolmans | + 2' 43" |
| 8 | Lucinda Brand (NED) | Team Sunweb | + 3' 02" |
| 9 | Floortje Mackaij (NED) | Team Sunweb | + 3' 02" |
| 10 | Sabrina Stultiens (NED) | Team Sunweb | + 3' 02" |

=== Stage 4 ===
3 July 2017 — Occhiobello to Occhiobello, 118 km (73.3 mi)

Result of Stage 4
| Rank | Rider | Team | Time |
|---|---|---|---|
| 1 | Jolien D'Hoore (BEL) | Wiggle High5 | 2h 42' 04" |
| 2 | Chloe Hosking (AUS) | Alé–Cipollini | + 0" |
| 3 | Coryn Rivera (USA) | Team Sunweb | + 0" |
| 4 | Hannah Barnes (GBR) | Canyon//SRAM | + 0" |
| 5 | Giorgia Bronzini (ITA) | Wiggle High5 | + 0" |
| 6 | Arlenis Sierra (CUB) | Astana | + 0" |
| 7 | Annalisa Cucinotta (ITA) | Lensworld–Kuota | + 0" |
| 8 | Claudia Cretti (ITA) | Valcar–PBM | + 0" |
| 9 | Amalie Dideriksen (DEN) | Boels–Dolmans | + 0" |
| 10 | Ilaria Sanguineti (ITA) | Bepink–Cogeas | + 0" |

General classification after Stage 4
| Rank | Rider | Team | Time |
|---|---|---|---|
| 1 | Anna van der Breggen (NED) | Boels–Dolmans | 8h 36' 25" |
| 2 | Elisa Longo Borghini (ITA) | Wiggle High5 | + 26" |
| 3 | Megan Guarnier (USA) | Boels–Dolmans | + 1' 56" |
| 4 | Annemiek van Vleuten (NED) | Orica–Scott | + 2' 17" |
| 5 | Amanda Spratt (AUS) | Orica–Scott | + 2' 22" |
| 6 | Katarzyna Niewiadoma (POL) | WM3 Energie | + 2' 37" |
| 7 | Karol-Ann Canuel (CAN) | Boels–Dolmans | + 2' 43" |
| 8 | Lucinda Brand (NED) | Team Sunweb | + 2' 59" |
| 9 | Floortje Mackaij (NED) | Team Sunweb | + 3' 02" |
| 10 | Sabrina Stultiens (NED) | Team Sunweb | + 3' 02" |

=== Stage 5 ===
4 July 2017 — Sant'Elpidio a Mare to Sant'Elpidio a Mare, 12.73 km (7.9 mi), individual time trial (ITT)

Result of Stage 5
| Rank | Rider | Team | Time |
|---|---|---|---|
| 1 | Annemiek van Vleuten (NED) | Orica–Scott | 25' 29" |
| 2 | Anna van der Breggen (NED) | Boels–Dolmans | + 41" |
| 3 | Elisa Longo Borghini (ITA) | Wiggle High5 | + 1' 15" |
| 4 | Amanda Spratt (AUS) | Orica–Scott | + 1' 48" |
| 5 | Megan Guarnier (USA) | Boels–Dolmans | + 1' 53" |
| 6 | Arlenis Sierra (CUB) | Astana | + 2' 01" |
| 7 | Katarzyna Niewiadoma (POL) | WM3 Energie | + 2' 03" |
| 8 | Claudia Lichtenberg (GER) | Wiggle High5 | + 2' 10" |
| 9 | Hannah Barnes (GBR) | Canyon//SRAM | + 2' 13" |
| 10 | Karol-Ann Canuel (CAN) | Boels–Dolmans | + 2' 17" |

General classification after Stage 5
| Rank | Rider | Team | Time |
|---|---|---|---|
| 1 | Anna van der Breggen (NED) | Boels–Dolmans | 9h 02' 35" |
| 2 | Elisa Longo Borghini (ITA) | Wiggle High5 | + 1' 00" |
| 3 | Annemiek van Vleuten (NED) | Orica–Scott | + 1' 36" |
| 4 | Megan Guarnier (USA) | Boels–Dolmans | + 3' 08" |
| 5 | Amanda Spratt (AUS) | Orica–Scott | + 3' 29" |
| 6 | Katarzyna Niewiadoma (POL) | WM3 Energie | + 3' 59" |
| 7 | Karol-Ann Canuel (CAN) | Boels–Dolmans | + 4' 19" |
| 8 | Claudia Lichtenberg (GER) | Wiggle High5 | + 4' 36" |
| 9 | Shara Gillow (AUS) | FDJ Nouvelle-Aquitaine Futuroscope | + 4' 50" |
| 10 | Arlenis Sierra (CUB) | Astana | + 4' 54" |

=== Stage 6 ===
5 July 2017 — Roseto degli Abruzzi to Roseto degli Abruzzi, 116.16 km (72.2 mi)

Result of Stage 6
| Rank | Rider | Team | Time |
|---|---|---|---|
| 1 | Lotta Lepistö (FIN) | Cervélo–Bigla Pro Cycling | 2h 50' 36" |
| 2 | Coryn Rivera (USA) | Team Sunweb | + 0" |
| 3 | Giorgia Bronzini (ITA) | Wiggle High5 | + 0" |
| 4 | Roxane Fournier (FRA) | FDJ Nouvelle-Aquitaine Futuroscope | + 0" |
| 5 | Elena Cecchini (ITA) | Canyon//SRAM | + 0" |
| 6 | Maria Giulia Confalonieri (ITA) | Lensworld–Kuota | + 0" |
| 7 | Emilie Moberg (NOR) | Team Hitec Products | + 0" |
| 8 | Anna van der Breggen (NED) | Boels–Dolmans | + 0" |
| 9 | Chloe Hosking (AUS) | Alé–Cipollini | + 0" |
| 10 | Annemiek van Vleuten (NED) | Orica–Scott | + 3" |

General classification after Stage 6
| Rank | Rider | Team | Time |
|---|---|---|---|
| 1 | Anna van der Breggen (NED) | Boels–Dolmans | 11h 53' 11" |
| 2 | Elisa Longo Borghini (ITA) | Wiggle High5 | + 1' 03" |
| 3 | Annemiek van Vleuten (NED) | Orica–Scott | + 1' 39" |
| 4 | Megan Guarnier (USA) | Boels–Dolmans | + 3' 11" |
| 5 | Amanda Spratt (AUS) | Orica–Scott | + 3' 32" |
| 6 | Katarzyna Niewiadoma (POL) | WM3 Energie | + 4' 02" |
| 7 | Karol-Ann Canuel (CAN) | Boels–Dolmans | + 4' 22" |
| 8 | Shara Gillow (AUS) | FDJ Nouvelle-Aquitaine Futuroscope | + 4' 53" |
| 9 | Arlenis Sierra (CUB) | Astana | + 4' 57" |
| 10 | Claudia Lichtenberg (GER) | Wiggle High5 | + 5' 02" |

=== Stage 7 ===
6 July 2017 — Isernia to Baronissi, 145.48 km (90.4 mi)

Result of Stage 7
| Rank | Rider | Team | Time |
|---|---|---|---|
| 1 | Sheyla Gutiérrez (ESP) | Cylance Pro Cycling | 3h 43' 16" |
| 2 | Soraya Paladin (ITA) | Alé–Cipollini | + 0" |
| 3 | Eugenia Bujak (POL) | BTC City Ljubljana | + 0" |
| 4 | Alexis Ryan (USA) | Canyon//SRAM | + 0" |
| 5 | Lauren Kitchen (AUS) | WM3 Energie | + 0" |
| 6 | Sabrina Stultiens (NED) | Team Sunweb | + 0" |
| 7 | Alison Jackson (CAN) | Bepink–Cogeas | + 0" |
| 8 | Tatiana Guderzo (ITA) | Lensworld–Kuota | + 0" |
| 9 | Carmela Cipriani (ITA) | Conceria Zabri–Fanini–Guerciotti | + 0" |
| 10 | Clara Koppenburg (GER) | Cervélo–Bigla Pro Cycling | + 0" |

General classification after Stage 7
| Rank | Rider | Team | Time |
|---|---|---|---|
| 1 | Anna van der Breggen (NED) | Boels–Dolmans | 15h 37' 14" |
| 2 | Elisa Longo Borghini (ITA) | Wiggle High5 | + 1' 03" |
| 3 | Annemiek van Vleuten (NED) | Orica–Scott | + 1' 39" |
| 4 | Megan Guarnier (USA) | Boels–Dolmans | + 3' 11" |
| 5 | Amanda Spratt (AUS) | Orica–Scott | + 3' 32" |
| 6 | Katarzyna Niewiadoma (POL) | WM3 Energie | + 4' 02" |
| 7 | Karol-Ann Canuel (CAN) | Boels–Dolmans | + 4' 22" |
| 8 | Shara Gillow (AUS) | FDJ Nouvelle-Aquitaine Futuroscope | + 4' 53" |
| 9 | Arlenis Sierra (CUB) | Astana | + 4' 57" |
| 10 | Sabrina Stultiens (NED) | Team Sunweb | + 5' 02" |

=== Stage 8 ===
7 July 2017 — Baronissi to Palinuro, 141.8 km (88.1 mi)

Result of Stage 8
| Rank | Rider | Team | Time |
|---|---|---|---|
| 1 | Lucinda Brand (NED) | Team Sunweb | 3h 46' 10" |
| 2 | Tetyana Ryabchenko (UKR) | Lensworld–Kuota | + 12" |
| 3 | Megan Guarnier (USA) | Boels–Dolmans | + 1' 33" |
| 4 | Annemiek van Vleuten (NED) | Orica–Scott | + 1' 33" |
| 5 | Elisa Longo Borghini (ITA) | Wiggle High5 | + 1' 33" |
| 6 | Anna van der Breggen (NED) | Boels–Dolmans | + 1' 33" |
| 7 | Katarzyna Niewiadoma (POL) | WM3 Energie | + 1' 33" |
| 8 | Amanda Spratt (AUS) | Orica–Scott | + 1' 33" |
| 9 | Karol-Ann Canuel (CAN) | Boels–Dolmans | + 1' 33" |
| 10 | Claudia Lichtenberg (GER) | Wiggle High5 | + 1' 36" |

General classification after Stage 8
| Rank | Rider | Team | Time |
|---|---|---|---|
| 1 | Anna van der Breggen (NED) | Boels–Dolmans | 19h 24' 57" |
| 2 | Elisa Longo Borghini (ITA) | Wiggle High5 | + 1' 03" |
| 3 | Annemiek van Vleuten (NED) | Orica–Scott | + 1' 39" |
| 4 | Megan Guarnier (USA) | Boels–Dolmans | + 3' 07" |
| 5 | Lucinda Brand (NED) | Team Sunweb | + 3' 26" |
| 6 | Amanda Spratt (AUS) | Orica–Scott | + 3' 32" |
| 7 | Katarzyna Niewiadoma (POL) | WM3 Energie | + 4' 02" |
| 8 | Karol-Ann Canuel (CAN) | Boels–Dolmans | + 4' 22" |
| 9 | Claudia Lichtenberg (GER) | Wiggle High5 | + 5' 05" |
| 10 | Arlenis Sierra (CUB) | Astana | + 5' 15" |

=== Stage 9 ===
8 July 2017 — Palinuro to Polla, 116.8 km (72.6 mi)

Result of Stage 9
| Rank | Rider | Team | Time |
|---|---|---|---|
| 1 | Marta Bastianelli (ITA) | Alé–Cipollini | 3h 05' 09" |
| 2 | Lotta Lepistö (FIN) | Cervélo–Bigla Pro Cycling | + 0" |
| 3 | Giorgia Bronzini (ITA) | Wiggle High5 | + 0" |
| 4 | Arlenis Sierra (CUB) | Astana | + 0" |
| 5 | Coryn Rivera (USA) | Team Sunweb | + 0" |
| 6 | Alexis Ryan (USA) | Canyon//SRAM | + 0" |
| 7 | Ilaria Sanguineti (ITA) | Bepink–Cogeas | + 0" |
| 8 | Amalie Dideriksen (DEN) | Boels–Dolmans | + 0" |
| 9 | Emilie Moberg (NOR) | Team Hitec Products | + 0" |
| 10 | Natalya Saifutdinova (KAZ) | Astana | + 0" |

General classification after Stage 9
| Rank | Rider | Team | Time |
|---|---|---|---|
| 1 | Anna van der Breggen (NED) | Boels–Dolmans | 22h 30' 06" |
| 2 | Elisa Longo Borghini (ITA) | Wiggle High5 | + 1' 03" |
| 3 | Annemiek van Vleuten (NED) | Orica–Scott | + 1' 39" |
| 4 | Megan Guarnier (USA) | Boels–Dolmans | + 3' 07" |
| 5 | Lucinda Brand (NED) | Team Sunweb | + 3' 26" |
| 6 | Amanda Spratt (AUS) | Orica–Scott | + 3' 32" |
| 7 | Katarzyna Niewiadoma (POL) | WM3 Energie | + 4' 02" |
| 8 | Karol-Ann Canuel (CAN) | Boels–Dolmans | + 4' 22" |
| 9 | Claudia Lichtenberg (GER) | Wiggle High5 | + 5' 05" |
| 10 | Arlenis Sierra (CUB) | Astana | + 5' 15" |

=== Stage 10 ===
9 July 2017 — Torre del Greco to Torre del Greco, 124 km (77.1 mi)

Result of Stage 10
| Rank | Rider | Team | Time |
|---|---|---|---|
| 1 | Megan Guarnier (USA) | Boels–Dolmans | 3h 09' 37" |
| 2 | Amanda Spratt (AUS) | Orica–Scott | + 0" |
| 3 | Katarzyna Niewiadoma (POL) | WM3 Energie | + 0" |
| 4 | Annemiek van Vleuten (NED) | Orica–Scott | + 0" |
| 5 | Anna van der Breggen (NED) | Boels–Dolmans | + 0" |
| 6 | Elisa Longo Borghini (ITA) | Wiggle High5 | + 0" |
| 7 | Lucinda Brand (NED) | Team Sunweb | + 46" |
| 8 | Arlenis Sierra (CUB) | Astana | + 1' 04" |
| 9 | Janneke Ensing (NED) | Alé–Cipollini | + 1' 04" |
| 10 | Romy Kasper (GER) | Alé–Cipollini | + 1' 04" |

Final general classification
| Rank | Rider | Team | Time |
|---|---|---|---|
| 1 | Anna van der Breggen (NED) | Boels–Dolmans | 25h 39' 43" |
| 2 | Elisa Longo Borghini (ITA) | Wiggle High5 | + 1' 03" |
| 3 | Annemiek van Vleuten (NED) | Orica–Scott | + 1' 39" |
| 4 | Megan Guarnier (USA) | Boels–Dolmans | + 2' 57" |
| 5 | Amanda Spratt (AUS) | Orica–Scott | + 3' 26" |
| 6 | Katarzyna Niewiadoma (POL) | WM3 Energie | + 3' 58" |
| 7 | Lucinda Brand (NED) | Team Sunweb | + 4' 12" |
| 8 | Karol-Ann Canuel (CAN) | Boels–Dolmans | + 5' 26" |
| 9 | Claudia Lichtenberg (GER) | Wiggle High5 | + 6' 09" |
| 10 | Arlenis Sierra (CUB) | Astana | + 6' 19" |

== Classification leadership table ==
In the 2017 Giro d'Italia Femminile, five different jerseys were awarded. The most important was the general classification, which was calculated by adding each cyclist's finishing times on each stage. Time bonuses were awarded to the first three finishers on all stages with the exception of the time trials: the stage winner won a ten-second bonus, with six and four seconds for the second and third riders respectively. Bonus seconds were also awarded to the first three riders at intermediate sprints; three seconds for the winner of the sprint, two seconds for the rider in second and one second for the rider in third. The rider with the least accumulated time is the race leader, identified by a pink jersey. This classification was considered the most important of the 2017 Giro d'Italia Femminile, and the winner of the classification was considered the winner of the race.

Additionally, there was a points classification, which awarded a cyclamen jersey. In the points classification, cyclists received points for finishing in the top 10 in a stage, and unlike in the points classification in the Tour de France, the winners of all stages – with the exception of the team time trial, which awarded no points towards the classification – were awarded the same number of points. For winning a stage, a rider earned 15 points, with 12 for second, 10 for third, 8 for fourth, 6 for fifth with a point fewer per place down to a single point for 10th place.

Points for the mountains classification
| Position | 1 | 2 | 3 | 4 | 5 |
|---|---|---|---|---|---|
| Points for Category 2 | 7 | 5 | 3 | 2 | 1 |
| Points for Category 3 | 5 | 4 | 3 | 2 | 1 |

There was also a mountains classification, the leadership of which was marked by a green jersey. In the mountains classification, points towards the classification were won by reaching the top of a climb before other cyclists. Each climb was categorised as either second, or third-category, with more points available for the higher-categorised climbs; however on both categories, the top five riders were awarded points. The fourth jersey represented the young rider classification, marked by a white jersey. This was decided the same way as the general classification, but only riders born on or after 1 January 1995 were eligible to be ranked in the classification.

The fifth and final jersey represented the classification for Italian riders, marked by a blue jersey. This was decided the same way as the general classification, but only riders born in Italy were eligible to be ranked in the classification. There was also a team classification, in which the times of the best three cyclists per team on each stage were added together; the leading team at the end of the race was the team with the lowest total time. The daily team leaders wore red dossards in the following stage.

| Stage | Winner | General classification | Points classification | Mountains classification | Young rider classification | Italian rider classification | Teams classification |
|---|---|---|---|---|---|---|---|
| 1 | Boels–Dolmans | Karol-Ann Canuel | Not awarded (Note: Jersey awarded post-stage, but no points on offer during the stage.) | Not awarded | Amalie Dideriksen | Elisa Longo Borghini | Boels–Dolmans |
| 2 | Annemiek van Vleuten | Anna van der Breggen | Annemiek van Vleuten | Annemiek van Vleuten | Floortje Mackaij | Elisa Longo Borghini | Boels–Dolmans |
| 3 | Hannah Barnes | Anna van der Breggen | Annemiek van Vleuten | Annemiek van Vleuten | Floortje Mackaij | Elisa Longo Borghini | Boels–Dolmans |
| 4 | Jolien D'Hoore | Anna van der Breggen | Hannah Barnes | Annemiek van Vleuten | Floortje Mackaij | Elisa Longo Borghini | Boels–Dolmans |
| 5 | Annemiek van Vleuten | Anna van der Breggen | Annemiek van Vleuten | Annemiek van Vleuten | Floortje Mackaij | Elisa Longo Borghini | Boels–Dolmans |
| 6 | Lotta Lepistö | Anna van der Breggen | Annemiek van Vleuten | Annemiek van Vleuten | Floortje Mackaij | Elisa Longo Borghini | Boels–Dolmans |
| 7 | Sheyla Gutiérrez | Anna van der Breggen | Annemiek van Vleuten | Annemiek van Vleuten | Floortje Mackaij | Elisa Longo Borghini | Boels–Dolmans |
| 8 | Lucinda Brand | Anna van der Breggen | Annemiek van Vleuten | Annemiek van Vleuten | Cecilie Uttrup Ludwig | Elisa Longo Borghini | Boels–Dolmans |
| 9 | Marta Bastianelli | Anna van der Breggen | Annemiek van Vleuten | Annemiek van Vleuten | Cecilie Uttrup Ludwig | Elisa Longo Borghini | Boels–Dolmans |
| 10 | Megan Guarnier | Anna van der Breggen | Annemiek van Vleuten | Annemiek van Vleuten | Cecilie Uttrup Ludwig | Elisa Longo Borghini | Boels–Dolmans |
| Final | | Anna van der Breggen | Annemiek van Vleuten | Annemiek van Vleuten | Cecilie Uttrup Ludwig | Elisa Longo Borghini | Boels–Dolmans |

== See also ==
- 2017 in women's road cycling
