= 2017 Gent–Wevelgem (women's race) =

2017 UCI Women's World Tour, race 4 of 20

Race details
- Dates: 26 March 2017
- Stages: 1
- Distance: 146 km (91 mi)
- Winning time: 3h 53' 54"

Results
	Winner	Lotta Lepistö (FIN)	(Cervélo–Bigla Pro Cycling)
	Second	Jolien D'Hoore (BEL)	(Wiggle High5)
	Third	Coryn Rivera (USA)	(Team Sunweb)

UCI Report

The sixth edition of Gent–Wevelgem – In Flanders Fields was held on Sunday 26 March 2016. It was the women's event of Gent–Wevelgem cycling race, held in Belgium. It was the fourth race of the 2017 UCI Women's World Tour season.

Finland's Lotta Lepistö (Cervélo–Bigla Pro Cycling) won the race in a bunch sprint finish ahead of home rider Jolien D'Hoore (Wiggle High5) American Coryn Rivera (Team Sunweb) completed the podium.

== Route ==
=== Kemmelberg ===
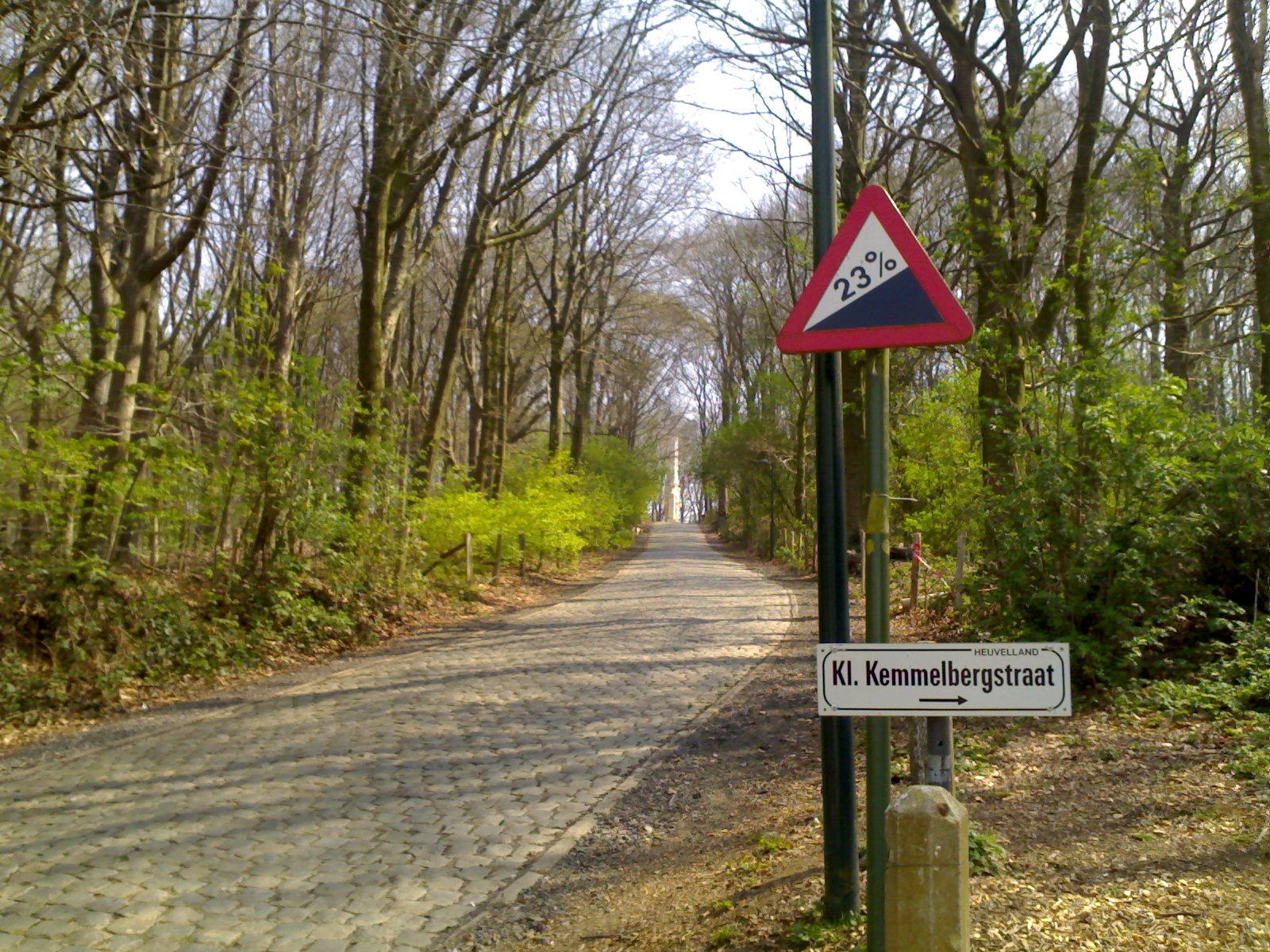
The Kemmelberg was addressed by its toughest road, with slopes up to 23% gradient.

The Kemmelberg is the centerpiece of the race. This edition, the second ascent of the Kemmelberg was addressed via its steepest road. The first ascent was via the traditional route with a maximum gradient of 17% but, the second was addressed via this steeper road, which has a maximum gradient of 23% near the top. (Note: The Cyclingnews.com link states that the traditional ascent of Kemmelberg has a 17% average gradient over less than half a kilometer, but in fact, that is its maximum.) Race director Hans De Clercq stated that it is a tribute to the historical significance of the Kemmelberg, as it is that road being used the first time the Kemmelberg was included in the men's race, in 1955. According to COTACOL, a Belgian standard work that has examined and graded every climb in the country, the "new" Kemmelberg ascent is the toughest climb in all Flemish races. They have given it an overall score of 183 points, which is more than the Koppenberg, the Muur van Geraardsbergen or the traditional Kemmelberg road.

== Teams ==
25 teams competed in the race.

UCI Women's Teams

- Alé–Cipollini
- Astana
- Bepink–Cogeas
- Bizkaia–Durango
- Boels–Dolmans
- BTC City Ljubljana
- Canyon//SRAM
- Cervélo–Bigla Pro Cycling
- Cylance Pro Cycling
- Drops
- FDJ Nouvelle-Aquitaine Futuroscope
- Team Hitec Products
- Lares–Waowdeals
- Lensworld–Kuota
- Lotto–Soudal Ladies
- WM3 Energie
- Parkhotel Valkenburg–Destil
- SAS–Macogep
- Servetto Giusta
- Team Sunweb
- Top Girls Fassa Bortolo
- Wiggle High5
- Orica–Scott
- Sport Vlaanderen–Etixx
- Team Virtu Cycling

== Result ==
Result
Rank	Rider	Team	Time
1	Lotta Lepistö (FIN)	Cervélo–Bigla Pro Cycling	3h 53' 54"
2	Jolien D'Hoore (BEL)	Wiggle High5	+ 0"
3	Coryn Rivera (USA)	Team Sunweb	+ 0"
4	Marta Bastianelli (ITA)	Alé–Cipollini	+ 0"
5	Lisa Brennauer (GER)	Canyon//SRAM	+ 0"
6	Maria Giulia Confalonieri (ITA)	Lensworld–Kuota	+ 0"
7	Alice Barnes (GBR)	Drops	+ 0"
8	Chantal Blaak (NED)	Boels–Dolmans	+ 0"
9	Elena Cecchini (ITA)	Canyon//SRAM	+ 0"
10	Sheyla Gutiérrez (ESP)	Cylance Pro Cycling	+ 0"

== See also ==
- 2017 in women's road cycling
