= 2017 Crescent Vårgårda Road Race =

2017 UCI Women's World Tour, race 16 of 20

Race details
- Dates: 13 August 2017
- Stages: 1
- Distance: 152 km (94 mi)
- Winning time: 3h 29' 54"

Results
	Winner	Lotta Henttala (FIN)	(Cervélo–Bigla Pro Cycling)
	Second	Marianne Vos (NED)	(WM3 Energie)
	Third	Leah Kirchmann (CAN)	(Team Sunweb)

The 2017 Crescent Vårgårda Road Race was the 16th event of the 2017 UCI Women's World Tour and the 12th edition of the Crescent Vårgårda Road Race. It was held on 13 August in Vårgårda, Sweden.

The race was won in a sprint by Finnish cyclist Lotta Henttala (Cervélo–Bigla Pro Cycling) from Dutch rider Marianne Vos (WM3 Energie) and the German Leah Kirchmann (Team Sunweb) in third place.

== Results ==
Result
Rank	Rider	Team	Time
1	Lotta Henttala (FIN)	Cervélo–Bigla Pro Cycling	3h 29' 54"
2	Marianne Vos (NED)	WM3 Energie	+ 0"
3	Leah Kirchmann (CAN)	Team Sunweb	+ 0"
4	Christine Majerus (LUX)	Boels–Dolmans	+ 0"
5	Ellen van Dijk (NED)	Team Sunweb	+ 0"
6	Chloe Hosking (AUS)	Alé–Cipollini	+ 0"
7	Marta Bastianelli (ITA)	Alé–Cipollini	+ 0"
8	Emilia Fahlin (SWE)	Wiggle High5	+ 0"
9	Maria Giulia Confalonieri (ITA)	Lensworld–Kuota	+ 0"
10	Kirsten Wild (NED)	Cylance Pro Cycling	+ 0"
