= Lotta Henttala =

Finnish cyclist

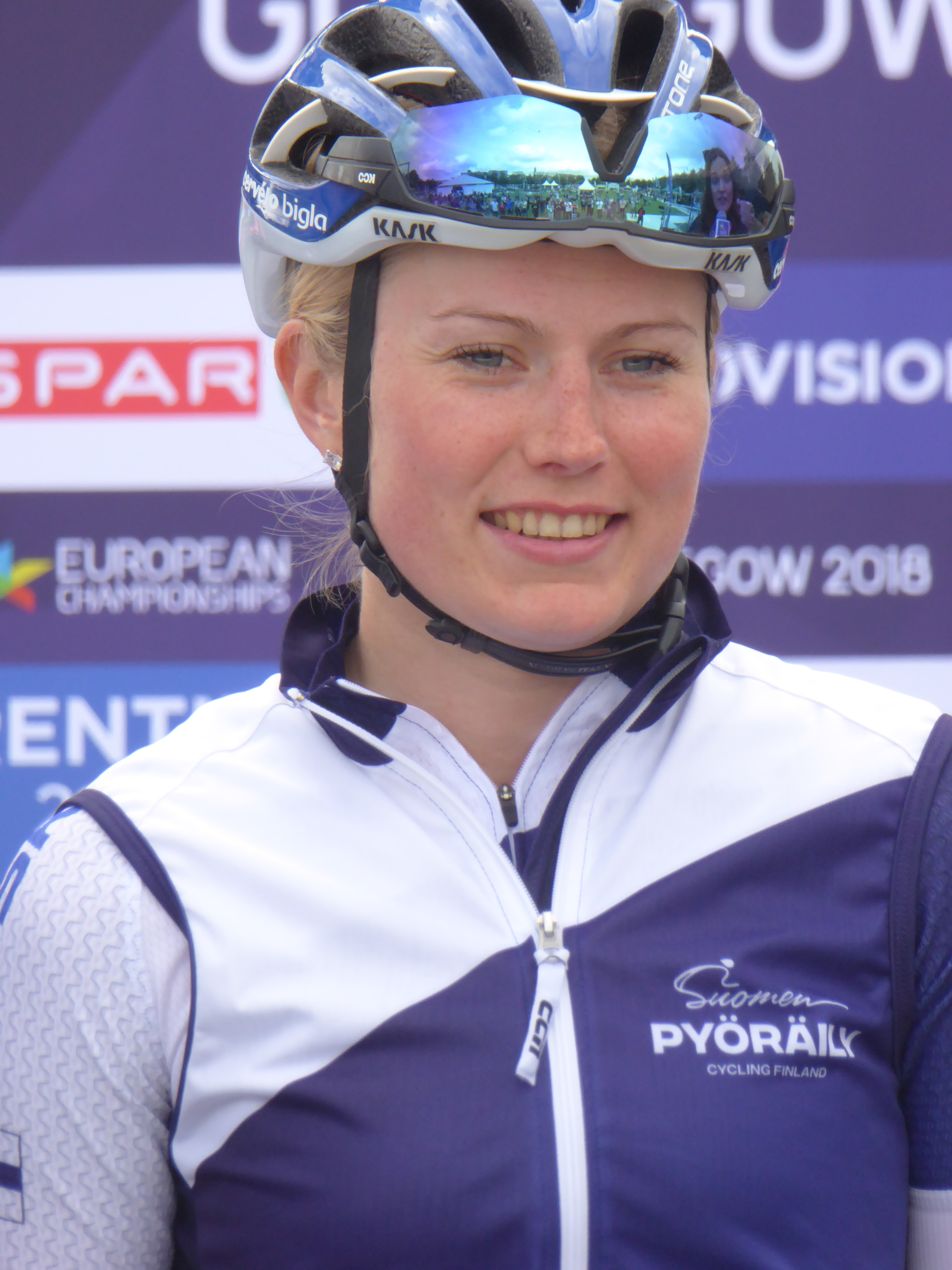
- Henttala at the 2018 European Road Cycling Championships.

Personal information
- Full name: Lotta Pauliina Henttala
- Born: Lotta Pauliina Lepistö; 28 June 1989 (age 37) Noormarkku, Finland
- Height: 1.64 m (5 ft 5 in)
- Weight: 58 kg (128 lb)

Cycling career
- Sport: Cycling
- Current team: EF Education–Oatly
- Discipline: Road
- Role: Rider
- Rider type: Sprinter

Amateur team
- 2022: Henttala Development Team

Professional teams
- 2014–2018: Bigla Cycling Team
- 2019–2020: Trek–Segafredo
- 2021: Ceratizit–WNT Pro Cycling
- 2023: AG Insurance–Soudal–Quick-Step
- 2024–: EF Education–Cannondale

Major wins
- UCI Women's WorldTour Gent–Wevelgem (2017) Open de Suède Vårgårda (2017) One-day races and Classics National Road Race Championships (2012–2018) National Time Trial Championships (2014–2018) Dwars door Vlaanderen (2017)
Medal record
Women's road cycling
Representing Finland
World Championships
Bronze medal – third place	2016 Doha	Road race
Representing Cervélo–Bigla Pro Cycling
World Championships
Bronze medal – third place	2016 Doha	Team time trial
Bronze medal – third place	2017 Bergen	Team time trial

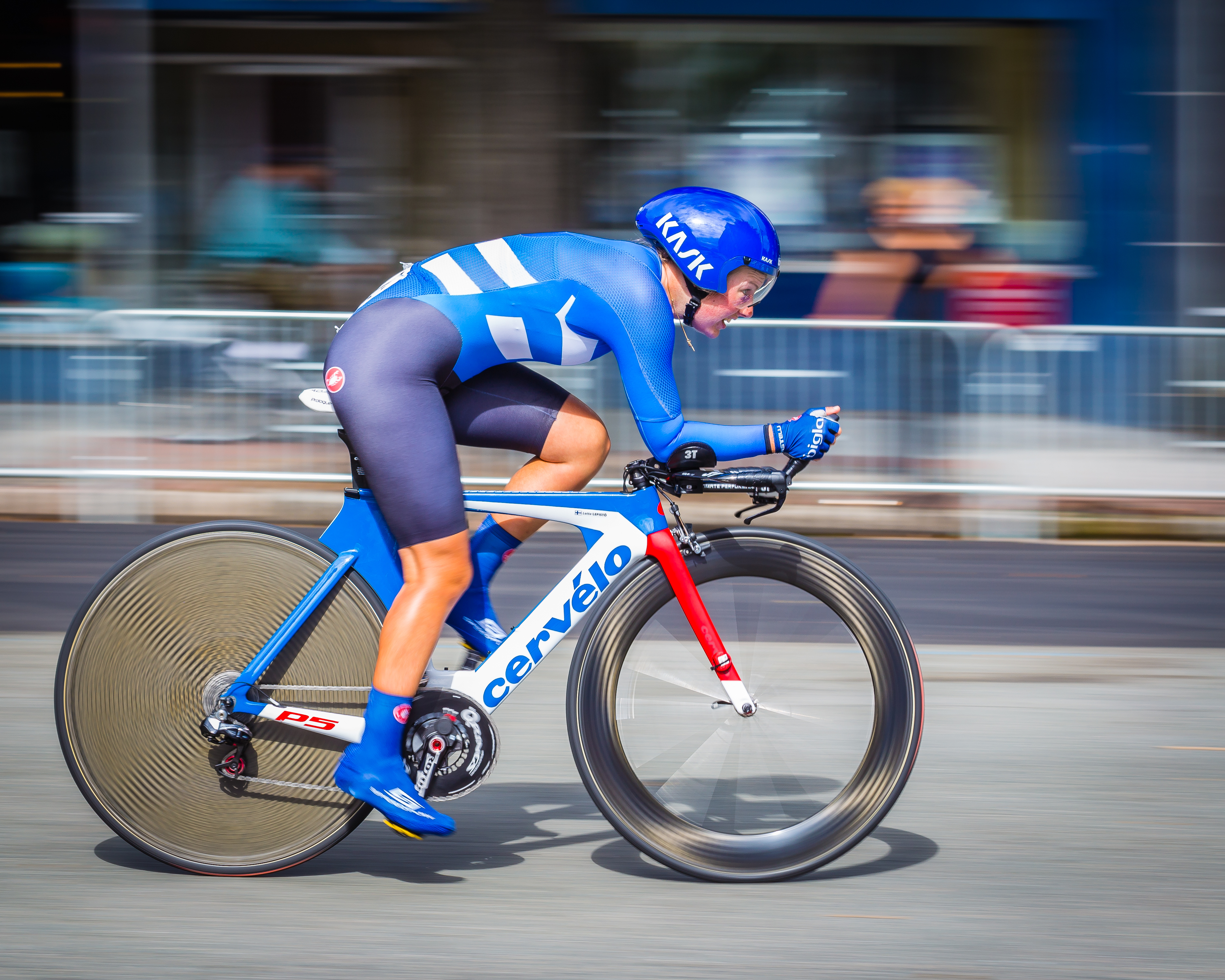
Henttala in the 2015 World Championship time trial

Lotta Pauliina Henttala (née Lepistö; born 28 June 1989) is a Finnish racing cyclist, who currently rides for UCI Women's Continental Team EF Education–Oatly. She has won the Finnish National Road Race Championships seven times, consecutively between 2012 and 2018.

== Career ==
She competed in swimming and triathlon alongside cycling in her youth, before focusing on cycling after becoming Finnish Under-16 road racing champion. She competed in the 2013 UCI women's road race in Florence. She qualified to represent Finland at the 2020 Summer Olympics, but did not compete due to pregnancy. After not competing professionally during the 2022 season, Henttala will return to the professional peloton in 2023 with UCI Women's Continental Team AG Insurance–Soudal–Quick-Step.

At the 2023 Tour de France Femmes, Henttala was disqualified after holding onto her team car; the directeur sportif of the team was also asked to leave the race. Henttala and AG Insurance–Soudal–Quick-Step later refuted the claims of the commissaires, stating that she "held onto a water bottle for a few seconds but did not hang onto the team car".

== Personal life ==
In October 2019, she married fellow professional cyclist Joonas Henttala, and their first child – a son – was born in January 2022.

== Major results ==
2008
National Road Championships

2nd Road race
2nd Time trial

2009
National Road Championships

2nd Time trial
4th Road race

8th GP Stad Roeselare
2011
5th Road race, National Road Championships
2012
1st Road race, National Road Championships
1st Tour de Helsinki
2013
National Road Championships

1st Road race
2nd Time trial

1st De Pinte
1st Lebbeke
1st Festival Cycliste Preizerdaul ITT
5th Overall Naisten etappiajo

1st Stages 1 (ITT) & 5

2014
National Road Championships

1st Time trial
1st Road race

2nd Frauen Prolog Grand Prix Gippingen
2nd Kriterium Meilen
2nd Kriterium Riehen
3rd Sparkassen Giro
3rd GP Osterhas
4th Trofee Maarten Wynants
4th Para+Cycling
6th Rund um Schönaich [LBS-Cup]
8th GP Comune di Cornaredo
9th Berner Rundfahrt
10th SwissEver GP Cham-Hagendorn
2015
National Road Championships

1st Time trial
1st Road race

1st Points classification Auensteiner–Radsporttage
3rd Berner Rundfahrt
3rd GP Oberbaselbiet
4th Grand Prix de Dottignies
4th Frauen Grand Prix Gippingen
4th Sparkassen Giro
5th Tour of Chongming Island World Cup
5th La Course by Le Tour de France
7th Overall Thüringen Rundfahrt der Frauen

1st Stage 4

9th Novilon Eurocup
2016
National Road Championships

1st Time trial
1st Road race

1st SwissEver GP Cham-Hagendorn
1st Prologue Emakumeen Euskal Bira
1st Stage 5 The Women's Tour
2nd La Course by Le Tour de France
Open de Suède Vårgårda

2nd Road race
2nd Team time trial

UCI Road World Championships

3rd Road race
3rd Team time trial

3rd Omloop van het Hageland
3rd Chrono des Nations
3rd Pajot Hills Classic
8th Overall Festival Luxembourgeois du cyclisme féminin Elsy Jacobs

1st Stage 1

2017
National Road Championships

1st Time trial
1st Road race

1st Gent–Wevelgem
1st Crescent Vårgårda Road Race
1st Dwars door Vlaanderen
1st Stage 6 Giro Rosa
2nd Crescent Vårgårda Team Time Trial
2nd Prudential RideLondon Classique
3rd Team time trial, UCI Road World Championships
4th Omloop van het Hageland
5th Drentse Acht van Westerveld
6th Overall Grand Prix Elsy Jacobs
8th Road race, UEC European Road Championships
8th Overall Healthy Ageing Tour
8th Overall Ladies Tour of Norway
2018
National Road Championships

1st Time trial
1st Road race

1st Stage 5 The Women's Tour
1st Prologue Giro della Toscana Int. Femminile – Memorial Michela Fanini
Crescent Vårgårda

3rd Road race
3rd Team time trial

4th Overall Festival Elsy Jacobs
5th Prudential RideLondon Classique
8th Amstel Gold Race
10th Time trial, UEC European Road Championships
2019
Setmana Ciclista Valenciana

1st Stages 2 & 4

2nd Omloop van het Hageland
4th Three Days of Bruges–De Panne
7th Overall Healthy Ageing Tour

1st Stage 1

2020
7th Omloop van het Hageland
8th Race Torquay
2024
1st Stage 1 Vuelta a Burgos Feminas
5th Dwars door de Westhoek
2025
1st Trofeo Marratxi-Felanitx
