= 2017 Crescent Vårgårda Team Time Trial =

2017 UCI Women's World Tour, race 15 of 20

Race details
- Dates: 11 August 2017
- Stages: 1
- Distance: 43 km (27 mi)
- Winning time: 52' 51"

Results
	Winner	Boels–Dolmans
	Second	Cervélo–Bigla Pro Cycling
	Third	Canyon//SRAM

The 2017 Crescent Vårgårda Team Time Trial featured as the 15th event of the 2017 UCI Women's World Tour. It was held on 11 August in Vårgårda, Sweden.

Taking place over a 43 kilometres (27 mi) course, the race was won by the Boels–Dolmans team for the second year in succession.

== Results ==
Result
Rank	Team	Time
1	Boels–Dolmans	52' 39"
2	Cervélo–Bigla Pro Cycling	+ 13"
3	Canyon//SRAM	+ 51"
4	Team Sunweb	+ 1' 23"
5	Wiggle High5	+ 2' 08"
6	Team VéloCONCEPT	+ 2' 22"
7	WM3 Energie	+ 2' 26"
8	FDJ Nouvelle-Aquitaine Futuroscope	+ 2' 33"
9	Team Hitec Products	+ 3' 06"
10	BTC City Ljubljana	+ 3' 08"
11	Australia (national team)	+ 3' 17"
12	Bepink–Cogeas	+ 3' 21"
13	Cylance Pro Cycling	+ 3' 25"
14	Alé–Cipollini	+ 3' 29"
15	Lotto–Soudal Ladies	+ 4' 42"
16	Drops	+ 4' 57"
17	Lensworld–Kuota	+ 5' 14"
18	Servetto Giusta	+ 5' 29"
19	Lares–Waowdeals	+ 5' 30"
20	Norway (national team)	+ 5' 37"
21	Sport Vlaanderen–Guill D'or	+ 6' 37"
