= 2018 Tour of Flanders for Women =

2018 UCI Women's World Tour, race 6 of 24
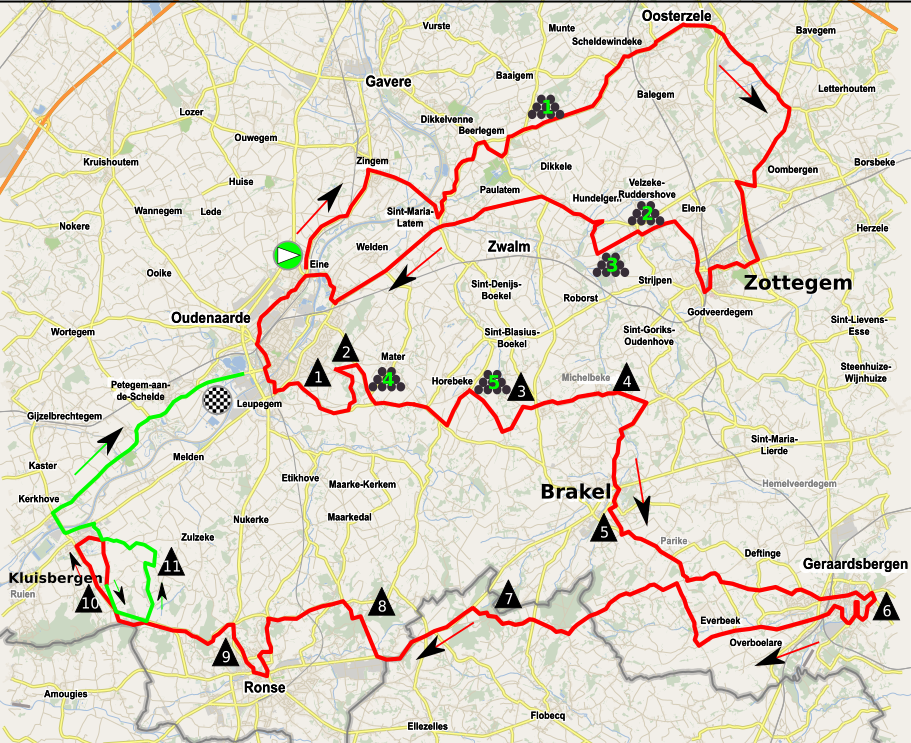

Race details
- Dates: 1 April 2018
- Distance: 153.3 km (95.3 mi)
- Winning time: 4h 08' 46"

Results
	Winner	Anna van der Breggen (NED)	(Boels–Dolmans)
	Second	Amy Pieters (NED)	(Boels–Dolmans)
	Third	Annemiek van Vleuten (NED)	(Mitchelton–Scott)

The 2018 Tour of Flanders for Women was the 15th running of the Tour of Flanders for Women, a women's bicycle race in Belgium. It was held on 1 April 2018, as the fifth race of the 2018 UCI Women's World Tour. Anna van der Breggen won the race with an attack just after the Kruisberg, at 27 km from the finish. Amy Pieters won the sprint for second place, at more than a minute from van der Breggen. Annemiek van Vleuten rounded out the entirely Dutch podium.

== Teams ==
Twenty-four teams participated in the race. Each team had a maximum of six riders:

Professional women's teams

- Team Sunweb
- Boels–Dolmans
- Mitchelton–Scott
- Cervélo–Bigla Pro Cycling
- Canyon//SRAM
- Wiggle High5
- WaowDeals Pro Cycling
- Alé–Cipollini
- Cylance Pro Cycling
- FDJ Nouvelle-Aquitaine Futuroscope
- BTC City Ljubljana
- Hitec Products–Birk Sport
- Astana
- Team Virtu Cycling
- Valcar–PBM
- Lotto–Soudal Ladies
- Bepink
- Tibco–Silicon Valley Bank
- Trek–Drops
- Aromitalia Vaiano
- Parkhotel Valkenburg
- Movistar Team
- Doltcini–Van Eyck Sport
- Experza–Footlogix

== Summary ==
UCI Report

On 1 April 2018, the 15th Tour of Flanders for Women was run. It started and finished in Oudenaarde, with an identical route to the men's race, covering 153.3 kilometres (95.3 miles). The race was won by Olympic champion Anna van der Breggen (Boels–Dolmans) after a 27-kilometre (17 mi) solo attack on the top of the Kruisberg. A crash just before the Muur van Geraardsbergen split the peloton early in the race. A select group of riders made a further gap on the Kruisberg, after which van der Breggen made her decisive move. She increased her lead on the Oude Kwaremont and Paterberg and maintained her effort to claim her first Tour of Flanders victory. Amy Pieters and Annemiek van Vleuten completed the entirely Dutch podium.

== Results ==
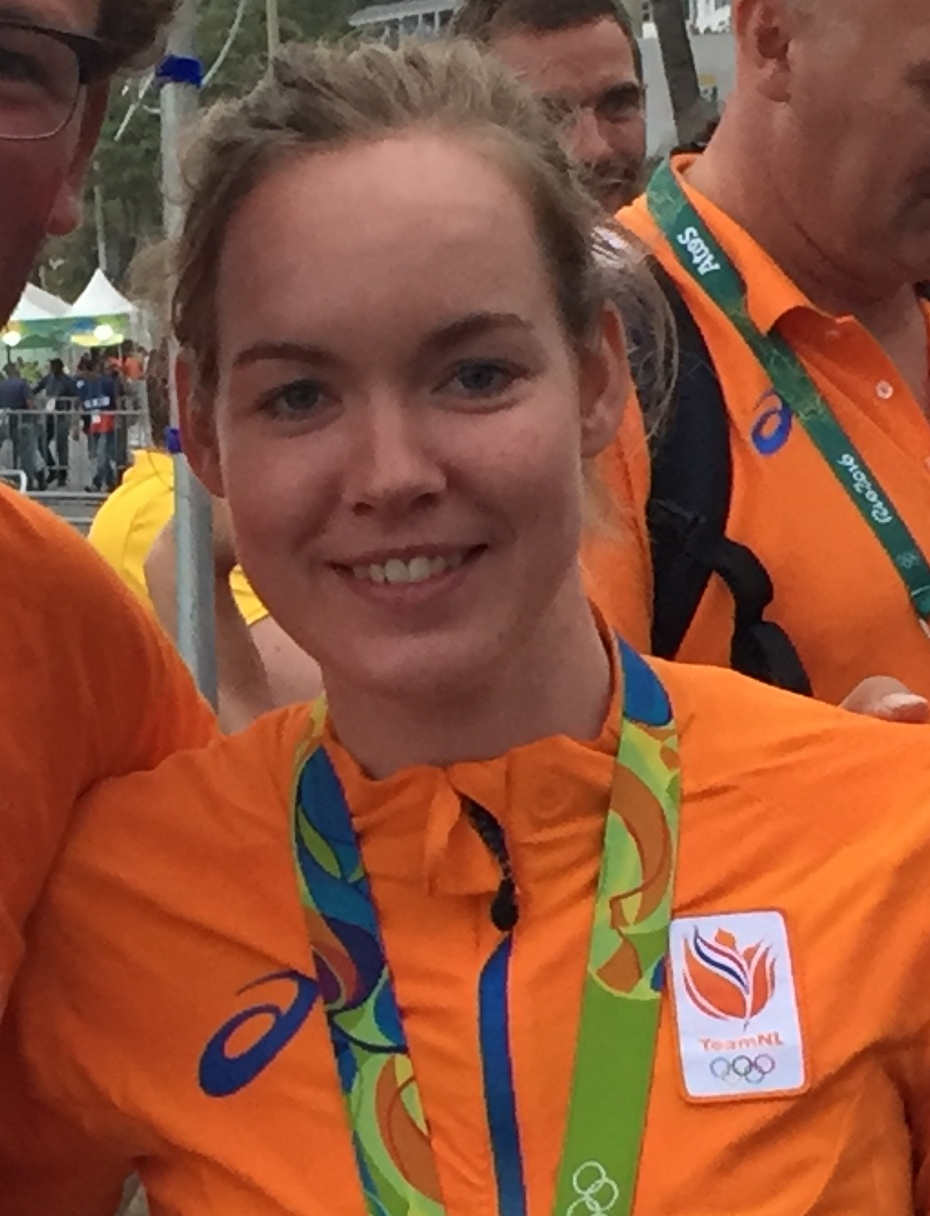
Dutch Olympic champion Anna van der Breggen won the women's race with an attack at 27 km from the finish.

Result
Rank	Rider	Team	Time
1	Anna van der Breggen (NED)	Boels–Dolmans	4h 08' 46"
2	Amy Pieters (NED)	Boels–Dolmans	+ 1' 08"
3	Annemiek van Vleuten (NED)	Mitchelton–Scott	+ 1' 08"
4	Ashleigh Moolman (RSA)	Cervélo–Bigla Pro Cycling	+ 1' 08"
5	Chantal Blaak (NED)	Boels–Dolmans	+ 1' 08"
6	Małgorzata Jasińska (POL)	Movistar Team	+ 1' 08"
7	Ellen van Dijk (NED)	Team Sunweb	+ 1' 08"
8	Lisa Brennauer (GER)	Wiggle High5	+ 1' 08"
9	Katarzyna Niewiadoma (POL)	Canyon//SRAM	+ 1' 08"
10	Megan Guarnier (USA)	Boels–Dolmans	+ 1' 11"

== UCI World Tour ==
=== Attributed points ===
Position	1st	2nd	3rd	4th	5th	6th	7th	8th	9th	10th	11th	12th	13th	14th	15th	16-30th	31-40th
World Tour points	200	150	125	100	85	70	60	50	40	35	30	25	20	15	10	5	3

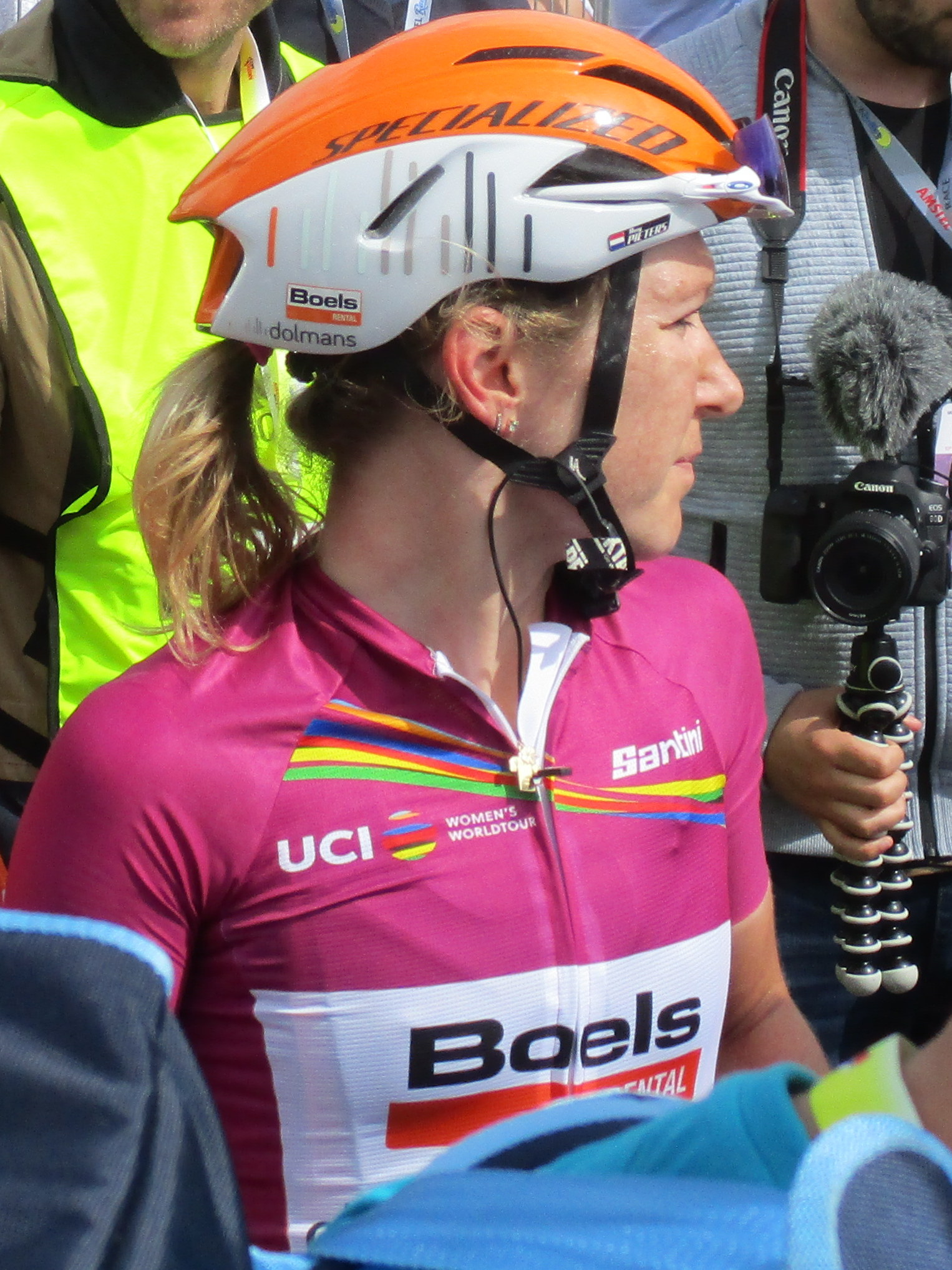
Amy Pieters took over the lead from Jolien D'Hoore in the World Tour ranking.

=== Individual ranking after Tour of Flanders ===
WorldTour points classification

Rank	Rider	Team	Points
1	Amy Pieters (NED)	Boels–Dolmans	440
2	Anna van der Breggen (NED)	Boels–Dolmans	405
3	Jolien D'Hoore (BEL)	Mitchelton–Scott	405
4	Katarzyna Niewiadoma (POL)	Canyon//SRAM	390
5	Marta Bastianelli (ITA)	Alé–Cipollini	370
6	Chantal Blaak (NED)	Boels–Dolmans	338
7	Chloe Hosking (AUS)	Alé–Cipollini	280
8	Marianne Vos (NED)	WaowDeals Pro Cycling	238
9	Ashleigh Moolman (RSA)	Cervélo–Bigla Pro Cycling	210
10	Arlenis Sierra (CUB)	Astana	190
