= Tour of Flanders (women's race) =

Belgian one-day cycling race, one of the five monuments

Race details
- Date: Early April
- Region: Flanders, Belgium
- Local name: Ronde van Vlaanderen (Dutch)
- Discipline: Road
- Competition: UCI Women's World Tour (since 2016)
- Type: One-day race
- Organiser: Flanders Classics
- Web site: www.rondevanvlaanderen.be/nl/rvv/elite-vrouwen

History
- First edition: 2004
- Editions: 23 (as of 2026)
- First winner: Zoulfia Zabirova (RUS)
- Most wins: Lotte Kopecky (BEL) (3 wins)
- Most recent: Demi Vollering (NED)

The Tour of Flanders (Dutch: Ronde van Vlaanderen), formerly the Tour of Flanders for Women, is the women's sister edition to the men's Tour of Flanders. It is an annual road bicycle racing event in Flanders, Belgium, held in early April. It is held on the same day as the men's race, on much of the same roads but at a shorter distance. Belgian rider Lotte Kopecky holds the record with three wins, followed by Dutch riders Mirjam Melchers and Annemiek van Vleuten, German Judith Arndt and Italian Elisa Longo Borghini with two wins each.

The event has been held annually since 2004 on the same day as the men's race. From 2004 to 2015 it was part of the UCI Women's Road World Cup. Since 2016, the race has been included in the UCI Women's World Tour, cycling's top-tier female competition. Since the first edition, organisers have included more climbs and extended the race gradually from 94 km in the first edition to 163 km in 2024.

Since 2021, the women's race has shared the Tour of Flanders name with the men's race. To distinguish between them, they are now categorised as the 'Men Elite' and 'Women Elite' editions.

== History ==
Tour of Flanders was first held in 1913, making it the youngest of the five cycling monuments. The race is the first of the cobbled classics, and is raced on the first Sunday of April. Notable for the narrow short hills (hellingen) in the Flemish Ardennes, usually steep and cobbled, the route forces the best riders to continually fight for space at the front.

=== The first race ===
The first running of the Tour of Flanders for Women was held on 4 April 2004. The race was 94 km long, making it the shortest in history, and featured nine categorized climbs, including the Muur van Geraardsbergen and Bosberg as the last two climbs. The race started in Oudenaarde and finished in Ninove, with the last 55 km identical to the men's race. Russia's Zoulfia Zabirova won the inaugural event after she broke clear on the Muur and crossed the finish solo. Trixi Worrack beat Leontien van Moorsel in a sprint for second place.

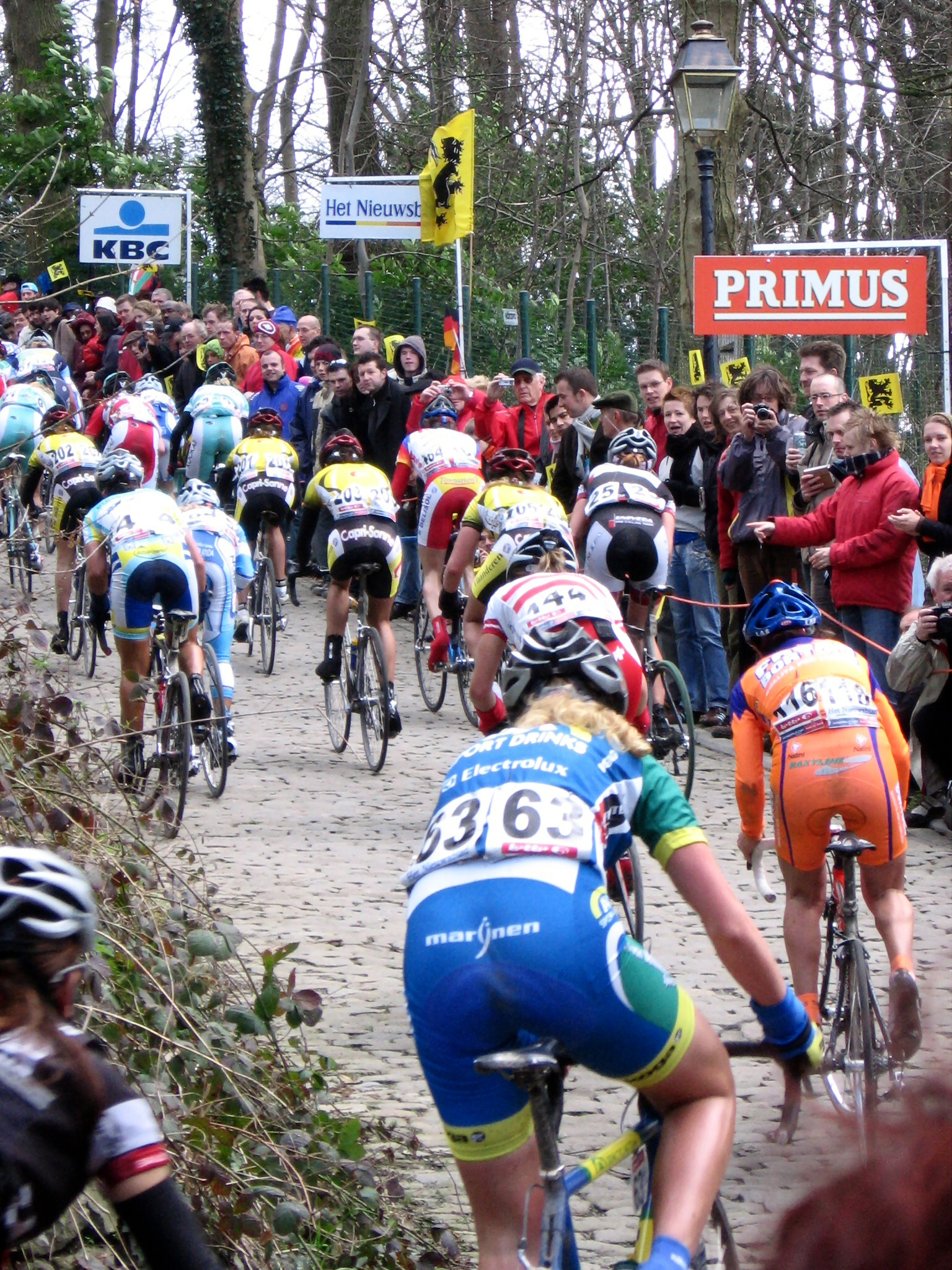
Josephine Groenveld (in blue) and Fabiana Luperini (in orange) at the 2006 race on the Muur van Geraardsbergen

=== Farce in 2005 ===
The second Tour of Flanders in 2005 was extended to 112 km, featuring 12 climbs. Dutch rider Mirjam Melchers-van Poppel won the race, after distancing her teammate and breakaway companion Susanne Ljungskog in the final kilometer. The race for third place ended in farcical circumstances. A group of 20 riders was sent the wrong way in the final two kilometres and crossed the finish line in the opposite direction. All riders in the group, including World Cup leader Oenone Wood, were disqualified from the race. Melchers repeated her win in 2006, becoming the first to win the race twice.

By 2009, the race ran over 131 km and contained three long flat cobbled sectors in addition to the climbs. German sprinter Ina-Yoko Teutenberg won the event in a sprint of a 15-strong group ahead of Kirsten Wild and Emma Johansson. The first Belgian rider to win the Tour of Flanders was Grace Verbeke in 2010 after she narrowly stayed ahead of the chasing group.

=== Move to Oudenaarde ===
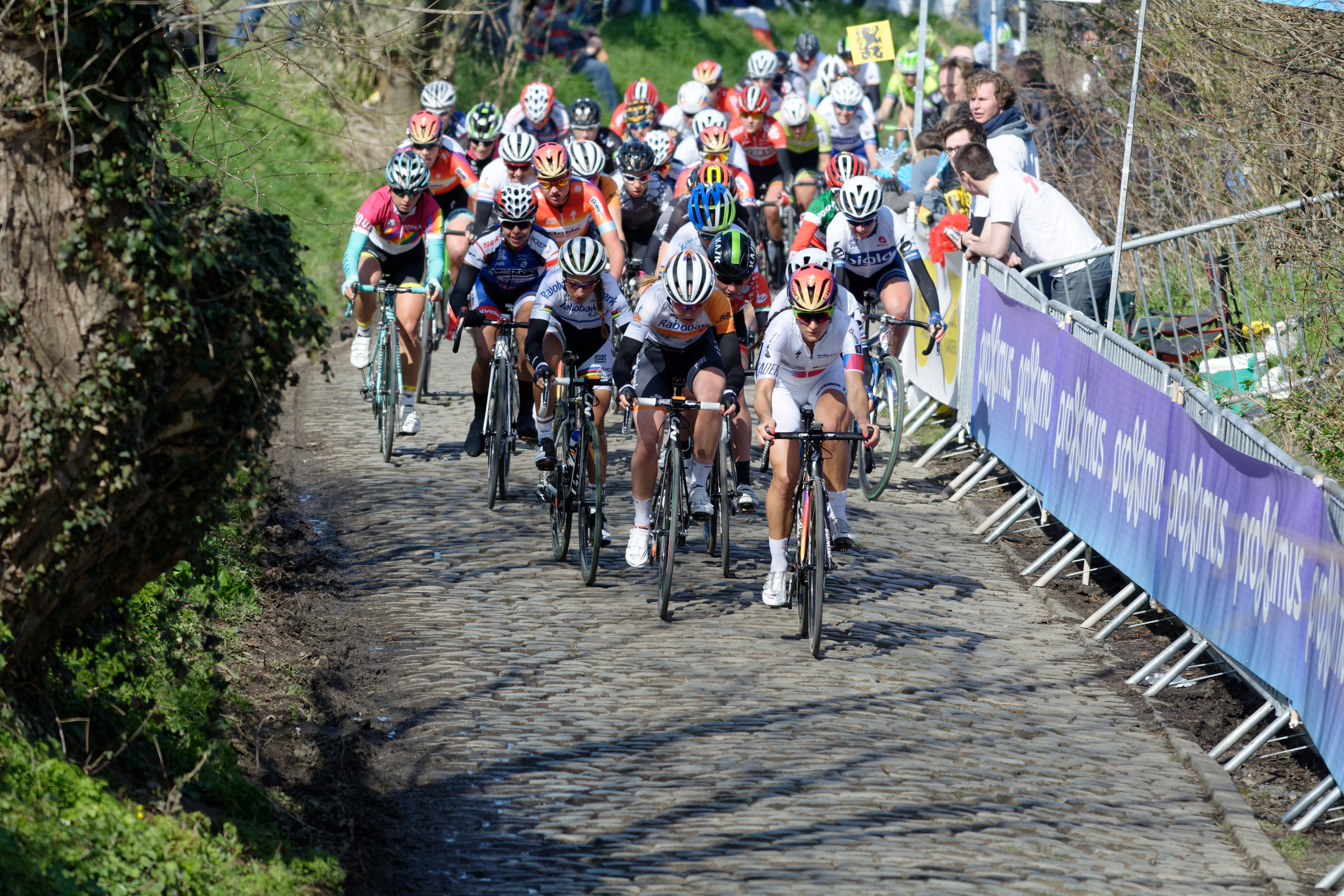
Peloton on the lower slopes of Oude Kwaremont at the 2015 event.

In 2012 the finish of both the men's and women's events moved to Oudenaarde, making Oudenaarde both the start and finish location of the women's race. The Oude Kwaremont and Paterberg replaced the Muur van Geraardsbergen and Bosberg as the final two climbs of the race. German Judith Arndt became the second woman to win the Tour of Flanders on two separate occasions. As she did in her first win in 2008, Arndt beat American Kristin Armstrong in a two-up sprint.

Cycling greatness Marianne Vos won the 2013 event, following three previous podium places, in a four-woman sprint ahead of Ellen van Dijk and Emma Johansson, after the quartet had gotten away on Oude Kwaremont. Van Dijk soloed to victory in 2014 with a move on the Hotond climb, at 26 km from the finish, and held a winning margin of more than one minute over Lizzie Armitstead and Emma Johansson. Elisa Longo Borghini was the first Italian winner in 2015 with an attack at 30 km from the finish. Jolien D'Hoore won the sprint for second before Anna van der Breggen.

=== Women's World Tour ===
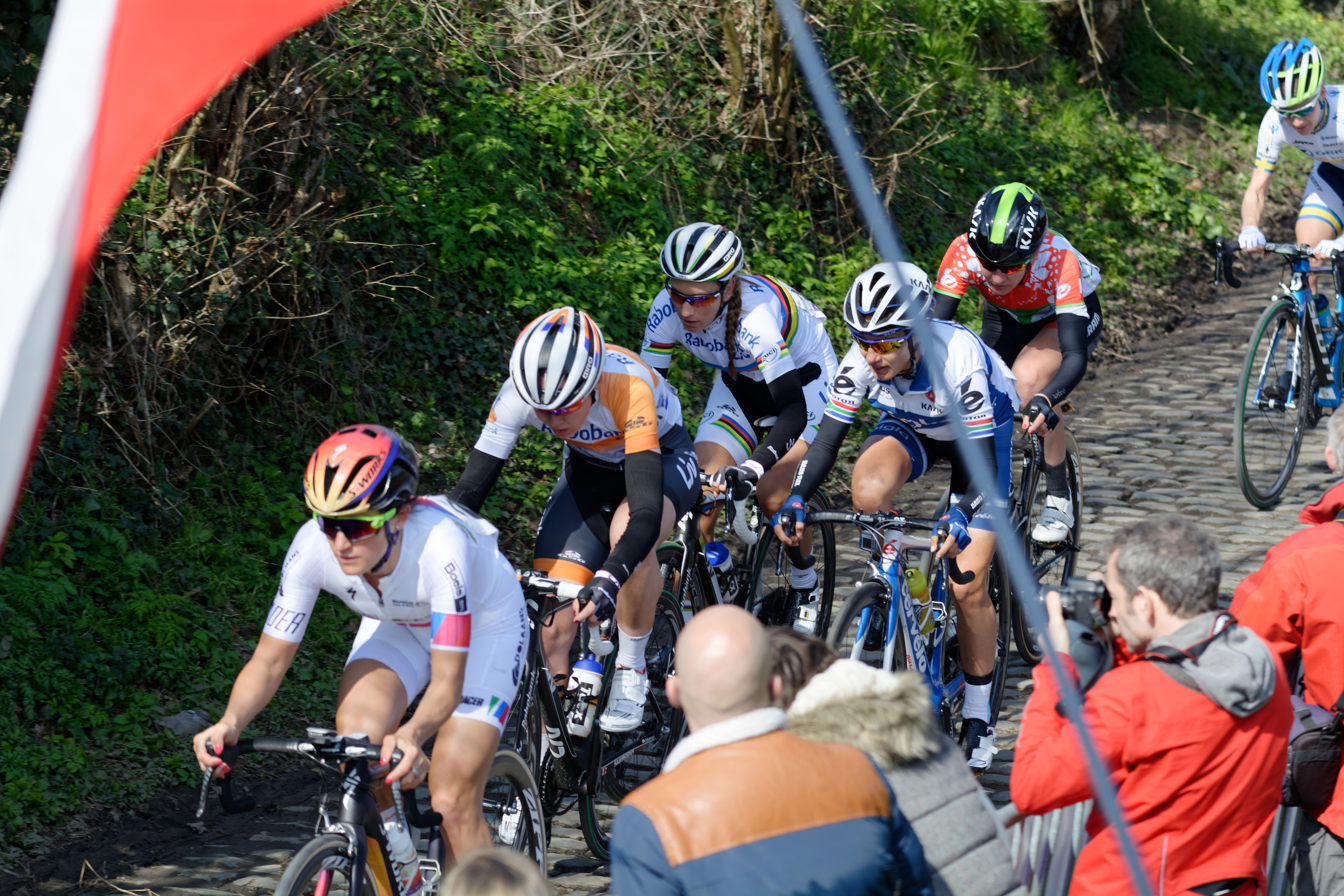
Lizzie Deignan leads a group ahead of Anna van der Breggen and Pauline Ferrand-Prévot on Oude Kwaremont.

In 2016 the Tour of Flanders was included in the inaugural UCI Women's World Tour. Britain's Lizzie Armitstead won the race in a two-up sprint with Emma Johansson after the duo had broken clear on Oude Kwaremont. Sweden's Emma Johansson holds four podium finishes, but failed to claim a Tour of Flanders victory.

The 2017 event was the first run under the new UCI regulations, which allowed for longer women's races. The route was extended to 153.2 km, featuring 12 climbs and five flat sectors of cobbles. After a six-year hiatus, organisers brought back the Muur van Geraardsbergen, as they had done for the men. Coryn Rivera became the first American winner in an 18-strong sprint before Gracie Elvin and Chantal Blaak.

In 2018 the Tour of Flanders was the first women's event to be broadcast in full live on television. Olympic road race champion Anna van der Breggen won the race after a 28 km solo attack on the Kruisberg. She increased her lead over the Oude Kwaremont and Paterberg and maintained her effort to the finish. Amy Pieters was second at more than a minute from van der Breggen, the largest winning margin in the women's Tour of Flanders history.

In 2022, the famed Koppenberg was added to the women's course for the first time. Lotte Kopecky won both the 2022 and 2023 editions of the race, however was denied a third straight victory in 2024 by 2015 winner Elisa Longo Borghini.

From 2026, the UCI awarded more ranking points to Grand Tours and cycling monuments compared to other races in the UCI Women's World Tour – thereby officially designating the race as a cycling monument.

== Route ==
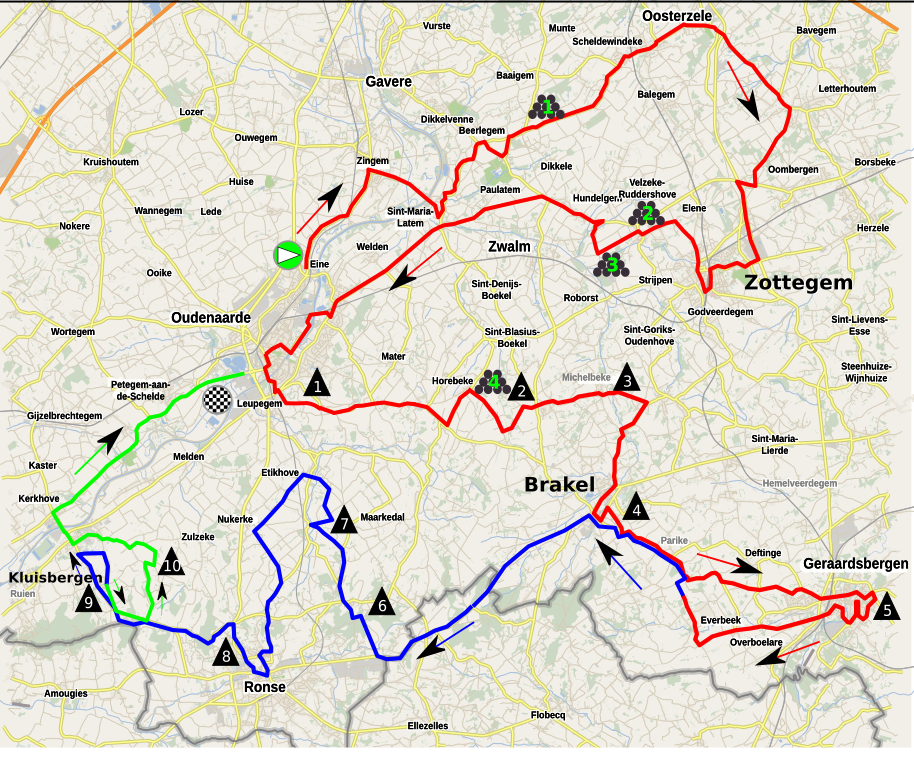
Roadmap of the 2019 event: the race starts and finishes in Oudenaarde, covering 157 km and taking in 10 climbs. The final 16 km are in green.

=== Present course ===
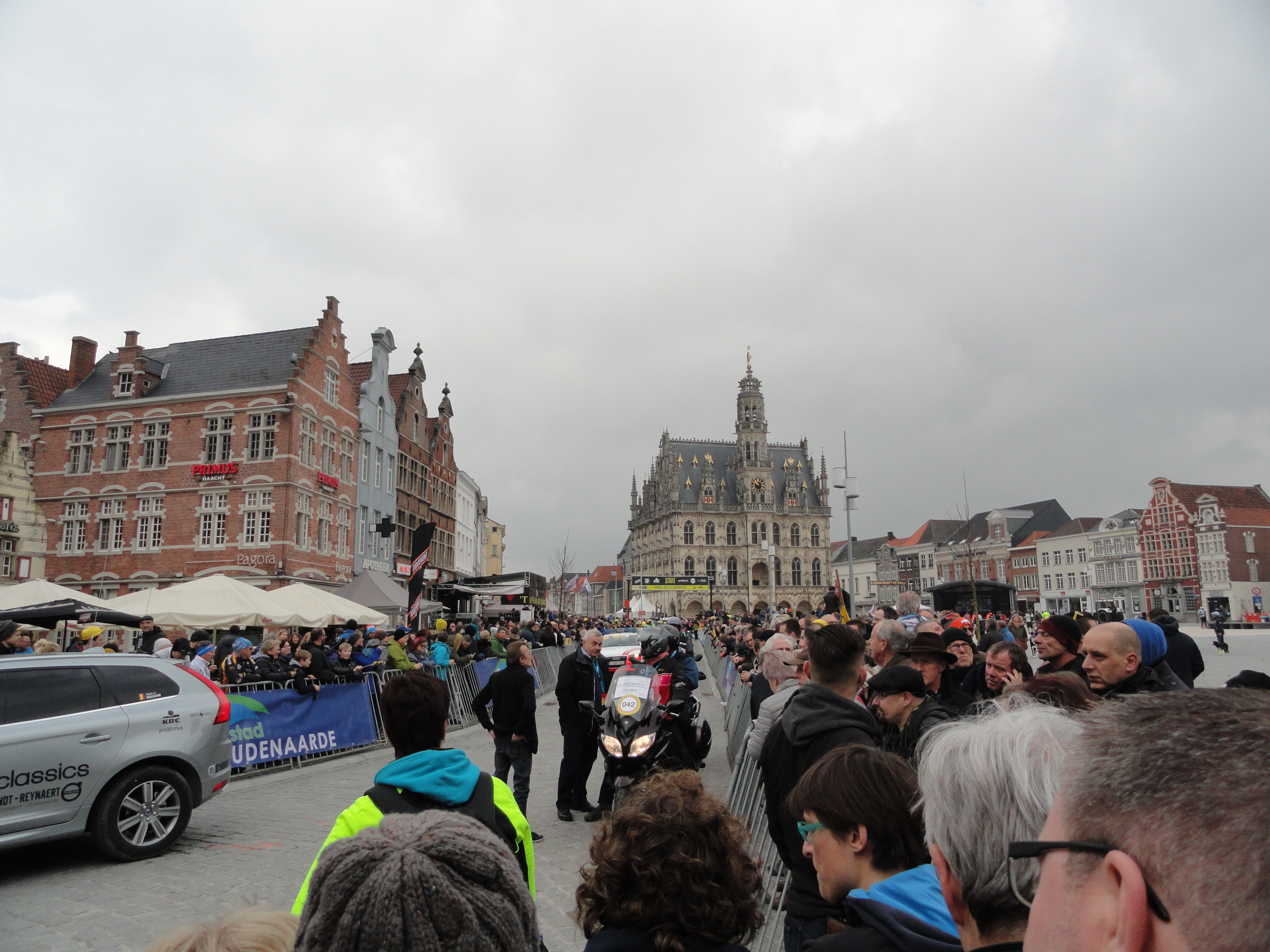
Start of the 2018 Tour of Flanders on the market square in Oudenaarde.

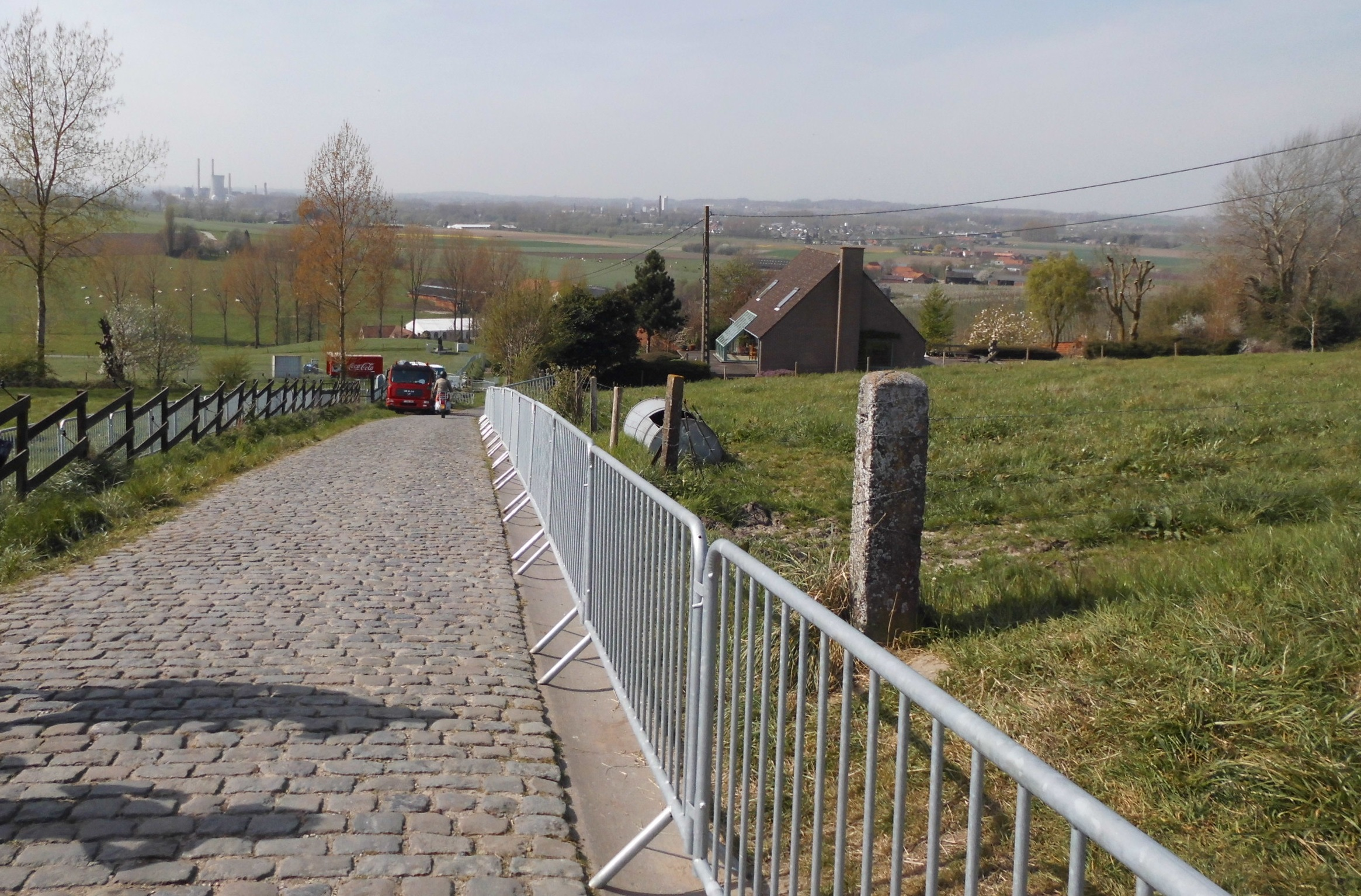
The Paterberg in Kluisbergen is the last climb of the race with 13 km remaining from the top.

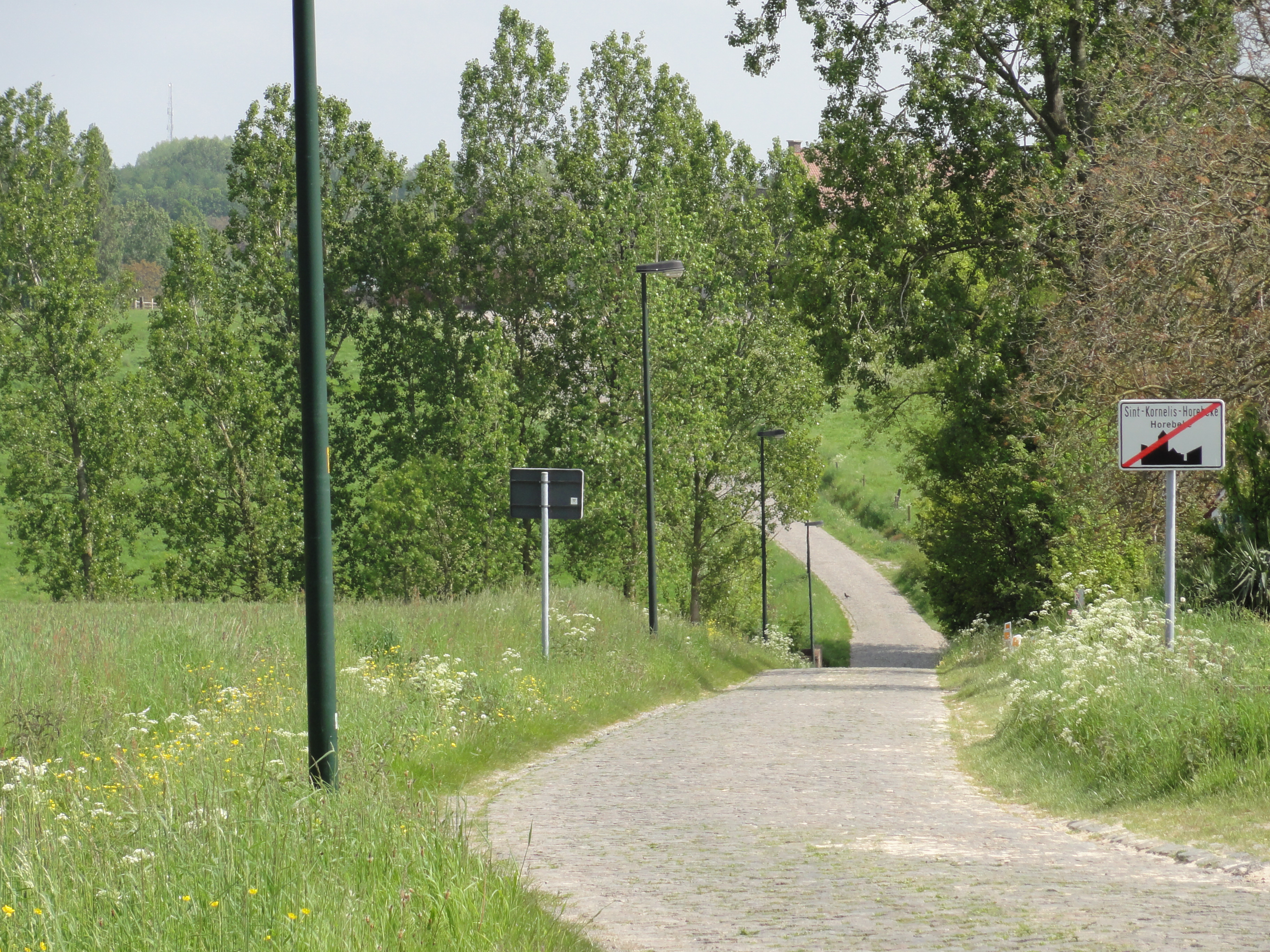
The Haaghoek road is the fifth and last flat cobbled sector of the race.

The race starts and finishes in Oudenaarde, 30 km south of Ghent in East Flanders. The course is usually between 150 kilometres (93 mi) and 160 kilometres (99 mi) in length and has a similar finale as the men's Tour of Flanders, with many of the same hills. The first 90 km wind through the hills of the Zwalm region, before addressing the climbs in the Flemish Ardennes between Geraardsbergen and Oudenaarde in the last 60 km. The final 60 km contain the most iconic climbs, notably the Muur van Geraardsbergen, Koppenberg, Oude Kwaremont and Paterberg. The course runs almost entirely in the province of East Flanders. Since 2017, eight kilometres of the trajectory between Geraardsbergen and Ronse run over roads in the Walloon province of Hainaut.

=== Climbs and cobbled roads ===
The short, sharp hills (hellingen) in the Flemish Ardennes are a defining feature of the Tour of Flanders and the locations where spectators gather in large numbers. Each climb has its own characteristics with varying gradients and surface, presenting different challenges to the riders. The hills offer many opportunities to attack and are usually the decisive sites of the race. These climbs are notorious for being short but very steep, and most of them - but not all - are cobbled. Most of the climbs are located in a relatively small area, causing the roads to turn constantly and often abruptly, which explains the winding and irregular trajectory of the finale.

The Oude Kwaremont is 2.2 kilometres (1.4 mi) long with an uneven cobbled surface, but is relatively shallow in gradient (just 4.4%). The Paterberg is often the decisive final climb, with an average gradient of 10% and a maximum gradient of 20%. First tackled in 2022, the steepest climb is the fully cobbled Koppenberg, 600 metres (2,000 ft) in length with an average gradient of 9.7% with stretches of 22% – over a poorly paved narrow road.

In 2017 and 2018, the race featured 12 climbs, compared to 18 in the men's event, and five long flat cobbled sectors. The final 31 km, including Kruisberg, Oude Kwaremont and Paterberg, are identical to the men's finale. In addition to the climbs, there are five flat sectors of cobbles in the first half of the race, i.e. Langemunte, Lippenhovestraat, Paddestraat, Holleweg and Haaghoek, comprising 7.8 km of cobbles. The 2023 edition featured 13 climbs and 5 cobbled sectors.

Categorized climbs in the 2024 Tour of Flanders
No.	Name	Distance from		Surface	Length (metres)	Gradient (%)	
No.	Name	Start (km)	Finish (km)	Surface	Length (metres)	(ave.)	(max.)
1	Wolvenberg	72.1	90.9	asphalt	660	7.9%	17.3%
2	Molenberg	84.6	78.4	cobbles	420	6.6%	14.2%
3	Marlboroughstraat	88.6	74.4	asphalt	900	4.8%	8%
4	Berendries	92.6	70.4	asphalt	870	7.6%	10%
5	Valkenberg	97.9	65.1	asphalt	900	6.9%	15%
6	Kapelleberg	109.2	53.8	asphalt	1400	4.9%	10.4%
7	Koppenberg	118.4	44.6	cobbles	550	11.6%	22%
8	Steenbeekdries	123.7	39.3	cobbles	820	7.6%	12.8%
9	Taaienberg	126.2	36.8	cobbles	530	6.6%	15.8%
10	Kruisberg–Hotond	136.5	26.5	cobbles	2800	3.9%	9%
11	Oude Kwaremont	146.3	16.7	cobbles	2200	4%	11.6%
12	Paterberg	149.7	13.3	cobbles	360	12.9%	20.3%

Cobbled sectors in the 2024 Tour of Flanders
No.	Name	Distance from		Length (metres)
No.	Name	Start (km)	Finish (km)	Length (metres)
1	Lange Munte	9.2	153.8	2500
2	Lippenhovestraat	48.7	114.3	1100
3	Paddestraat	50.1	112.9	2200
4	Kerkgate	75.8	87.2	2550
5	Jagerij	78.4	84.6	730
6	Mariaborrestraat	112.4	40.6	400
7	Stationsberg	123.8	39.2	560

== Winners ==
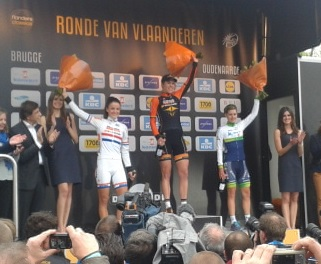
Podium of the 2014 event: Ellen van Dijk (middle) flanked by Lizzie Armitstead (l) and Emma Johansson (r).

Year	1st	2nd	3rd
2004	Zoulfia Zabirova (RUS); Team Let's Go Finland	Trixi Worrack (GER); Equipe Nürnberger Versicherung	Leontien Zijlaard-van Moorsel (NED); Team Farm Frites-Hartol
2005	Mirjam Melchers-van Poppel (NED); Buitenpoort - Flexpoint Team	Susanne Ljungskog (SWE); Buitenpoort - Flexpoint Team	Monia Baccaille (ITA); Italian national team
2006	Mirjam Melchers-van Poppel (NED); Buitenpoort - Flexpoint Team	Christiane Soeder (AUT); Univega Pro Cycling Team	Loes Gunnewijk (NED); Buitenpoort - Flexpoint Team
2007	Nicole Cooke (GBR); Raleigh–Lifeforce–Creation	Zoulfia Zabirova (RUS); Bigla Cycling Team	Marianne Vos (NED); Team DSB Bank
2008	Judith Arndt (GER); Team High Road	Kristin Armstrong (USA); Cervélo–Lifeforce	Kirsten Wild (NED); AA-Drink Cycling Team
2009	Ina-Yoko Teutenberg (GER); Team Columbia–Highroad Women	Kirsten Wild (NED); Cervélo Test Team	Emma Johansson (SWE); AA-Drink Cycling Team
2010	Grace Verbeke (BEL); Lotto Ladies Team	Marianne Vos (NED); DSB Bank–LTO	Kirsten Wild (NED); Cervélo Test Team
2011	Annemiek van Vleuten (NED); Nederland Bloeit	Tatiana Antoshina (RUS); Gauss	Marianne Vos (NED); Nederland Bloeit
2012	Judith Arndt (GER); GreenEdge–AIS	Kristin Armstrong (USA); USA National Team	Joëlle Numainville (CAN); Canada National Team
2013	Marianne Vos (NED); Rabobank Women Cycling Team	Ellen van Dijk (NED); Team Specialized–lululemon	Emma Johansson (SWE); Hitec Products UCK
2014	Ellen van Dijk (NED); Boels–Dolmans	Lizzie Armitstead (GBR); Boels–Dolmans	Emma Johansson (SWE); Orica–AIS
2015	Elisa Longo Borghini (ITA); Wiggle–Honda	Jolien D'Hoore (BEL); Wiggle–Honda	Anna van der Breggen (NED); Rabobank-Liv Woman Cycling Team
2016	Lizzie Armitstead (GBR); Boels–Dolmans	Emma Johansson (SWE); Wiggle High5	Chantal Blaak (NED); Boels–Dolmans
2017	Coryn Rivera (USA); Team Sunweb	Gracie Elvin (AUS); Orica–Scott	Chantal Blaak (NED); Boels–Dolmans
2018	Anna van der Breggen (NED); Boels–Dolmans	Amy Pieters (NED); Boels–Dolmans	Annemiek van Vleuten (NED); Mitchelton–Scott
2019	Marta Bastianelli (ITA); Team Virtu Cycling	Annemiek van Vleuten (NED); Mitchelton–Scott	Cecilie Uttrup Ludwig (DEN); Bigla Pro Cycling
2020	Chantal van den Broek-Blaak (NED); Boels–Dolmans	Amy Pieters (NED); Boels–Dolmans	Lotte Kopecky (BEL); Lotto–Soudal Ladies
2021	Annemiek van Vleuten (NED); Movistar Team	Lisa Brennauer (GER); Ceratizit–WNT Pro Cycling	Grace Brown (AUS); Team BikeExchange
2022	Lotte Kopecky (BEL); SD Worx	Annemiek van Vleuten (NED); Movistar Team	Chantal van den Broek-Blaak (NED); SD Worx
2023	Lotte Kopecky (BEL); SD Worx	Demi Vollering (NED); SD Worx	Elisa Longo Borghini (ITA); Trek–Segafredo
2024	Elisa Longo Borghini (ITA); Lidl–Trek	Katarzyna Niewiadoma (POL); Canyon//SRAM	Shirin van Anrooij (NED); Lidl–Trek
2025	Lotte Kopecky (BEL); Team SD Worx–Protime	Pauline Ferrand-Prévot (FRA); Visma–Lease a Bike	Liane Lippert (GER); Movistar Team
2026	Demi Vollering (NED); FDJ United–Suez	Pauline Ferrand-Prévot (FRA); Visma–Lease a Bike	Puck Pieterse (NED); Fenix–Premier Tech

=== Multiple winners ===
Wins	Rider	Editions
3	Lotte Kopecky (BEL)	2022, 2023, 2025
2	Mirjam Melchers-van Poppel (NED)	2005, 2006
2	Judith Arndt (GER)	2008, 2012
2	Annemiek van Vleuten (NED)	2011, 2021
2	Elisa Longo Borghini (ITA)	2015, 2024

=== Wins per country ===
Wins	Country
9	Netherlands
4	Belgium
3	Germany; Italy
2	United Kingdom
1	Russia; United States

== Statistics ==
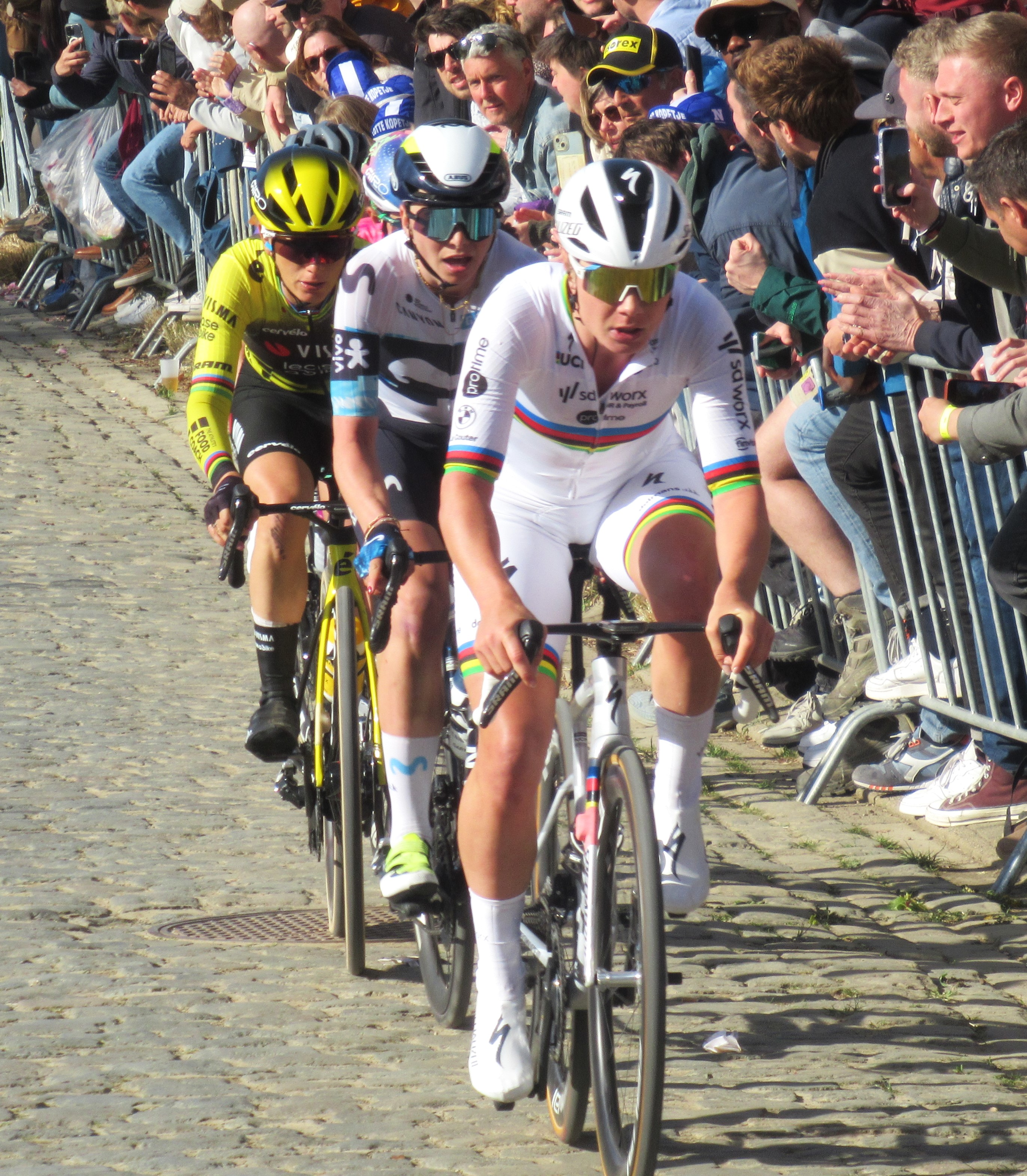
Lotte Kopecky (pictured during the 2025 edition) has won the race 3 times

- Shortest Tour of Flanders: 94 km (58 mi) (2004)
- Longest Tour of Flanders: 168.9 km (104.9 mi) (2025)
- Most wins: Lotte Kopecky (3)
- Most podium finishes: Annemiek van Vleuten (5)
- Most second places: Kristin Armstrong (2)
- Most country wins: The Netherlands (9)
- Youngest winner: Elisa Longo Borghini in 2015 (23 years and 116 days)
- Oldest winner: Annemiek van Vleuten in 2021 (38 years and 178 days)
- Largest margin between the winner and runner-up: 1 minute and 8 seconds (Anna van der Breggen in 2018)

== Legacy and impact ==
The history of the Tour of Flanders is celebrated at the Centrum Ronde van Vlaanderen (Tour of Flanders Center), a cycling-themed experience center and museum in Oudenaarde. It displays bikes of previous winners including Annemiek van Vleuten and Lotte Kopecky, as well as various interactive exhibits. In 2024, the museum added a temporary exhibition dedicated to Team SD Worx.

Each year, Tour of Flanders fans can also participate in the We Ride Flanders cyclosportive, organized on the day before the women's race. As of 2025, the longest route is 229 km (142 mi), starting in Bruges, in addition to three shorter routes of 158 km (98 mi), 120 km (75 mi) and 80 km (50 mi), all of which start and finish in Oudenaarde.

== See also ==
- Tour of Flanders (men's race)
- Classic cycle races
- Cycling monument
