= 2005 Tour of Flanders for Women =

2005 Tour of Flanders
2005 UCI Women's Road World Cup, race 4 of 11

Race details
- Dates: 3 April 2005
- Distance: 112 km (70 mi)
- Winning time: 3h 13' 00"

Results
	Winner	Mirjam Melchers (NED)	(Buitenpoort - Flexpoint Team)
	Second	Susanne Ljungskog (SWE)	(Buitenpoort - Flexpoint Team)
	Third	Monia Baccaille (ITA)	(Italian national selection)

The second running of the Tour of Flanders for Women, a women's road cycling race in Belgium, was held on 3 April 2005. The race started in Oudenaarde and finished in Ninove, taking in 12 climbs and covering a total distance of 112 kilometres (70 miles). It was the fourth round of the 2005 UCI Women's Road World Cup. Dutch rider Mirjam Melchers-Van Poppel won the race, crossing the line 7 seconds ahead of her teammate and breakaway companion Susanne Ljungskog.

The race for third place ended in farcical circumstances. The chasing group of 20 riders, including World Cup leader Oenone Wood, was sent the wrong way in the final two kilometres and crossed the finish line in the opposite direction. None of the riders in the group were included in the final result. Italian Monia Baccaille was officially placed third, after winning the sprint of the third group.

== Race Summary ==
Mirjam Melchers attacked with approximately 25 km to go on the run-in to the Muur van Geraardsbergen. On the Muur, she had a 15-second lead when her teammate, Susanne Ljungskog, attacked in pursuit and caught Melchers 200 m after the climb. The pair cooperated to the finish as the chasing bunch of 20 did not move closer than 40 seconds. Melchers accelerated away from her Buitenpoort - Flexpoint Team teammate with 200 m to go to and won her third World Cup race.

== Result ==
Result
Rank	Rider	Team	Time
1	Mirjam Melchers-Van Poppel (NED)	Buitenpoort - Flexpoint Team	3h 13' 00"
2	Susanne Ljungskog (SWE)	Buitenpoort - Flexpoint Team	+ 07"
3	Monia Baccaille (ITA)	Italian national team	+ 1' 23"
4	Monica Holler (SWE)	Elk Haus-Tirol Noe	s.t.
5	Giorgia Bronzini (ITA)	Mixed 2 Chirio Forno d'Asolo-Turbo	s.t.
6	Magali Le Floc'h (FRA)	French national team	s.t.
7	Suzanne de Goede (NED)	Van Bemmelen-AA Drink	s.t.
8	Sabrina Emmasi (ITA)	Team Bigla	s.t.
9	Élisabeth Chevanne Brunel (FRA)	Team Pruneaux D'agen	s.t.
10	Barbara Lancioni (ITA)	Ss Lazio Ciclismo Team Ladispoli	s.t.
