= 2004 Tour of Flanders for Women =

2004 Tour of Flanders
2004 UCI Women's Road World Cup, race 4 of 9

Race details
- Dates: 4 April 2004
- Distance: 94 km (58 mi)
- Winning time: 2h 26' 00"

Results
	Winner	Zulfiya Zabirova (RUS)	(Team Let's Go Finland)
	Second	Trixi Worrack (GER)	(Equipe Nürnberger Versicherung)
	Third	Leontien van Moorsel (NED)	(Team Farm Frites-Hartol)

The first running of the Tour of Flanders for Women, a women's road cycling race in Belgium, was held on 4 April 2004. The race started in Oudenaarde and finished in Meerbeke, taking in nine climbs and covering a total distance of 94 kilometres (58 miles). It was the fourth round of the 2004 UCI Women's Road World Cup. Russian Zulfiya Zabirova won the race after an attack on the Muur van Geraardsbergen, at 16 km from the finish line.

== Race summary ==
With a total distance of 94 km, the inaugural women's Tour of Flanders was the shortest in history. The peloton was thinned out in the early stages by repeated attacks by Leontien van Moorsel, Hanka Kupfernagel and Mirjam Melchers. In Geraardsbergen, 16 km from the finish, Zulfiya Zabirova surged clear on the Muur. Zabirova never held more than 15 seconds over a three-woman group but maintained her solo effort to the finish, two weeks after claiming victory in the Primavera Rosa. Four seconds behind, German Trixi Worrack won the second place ahead of van Moorsel and Melchers. Russian Olga Slyusareva won the field sprint for fifth place, 1' 20" later.

== Result ==
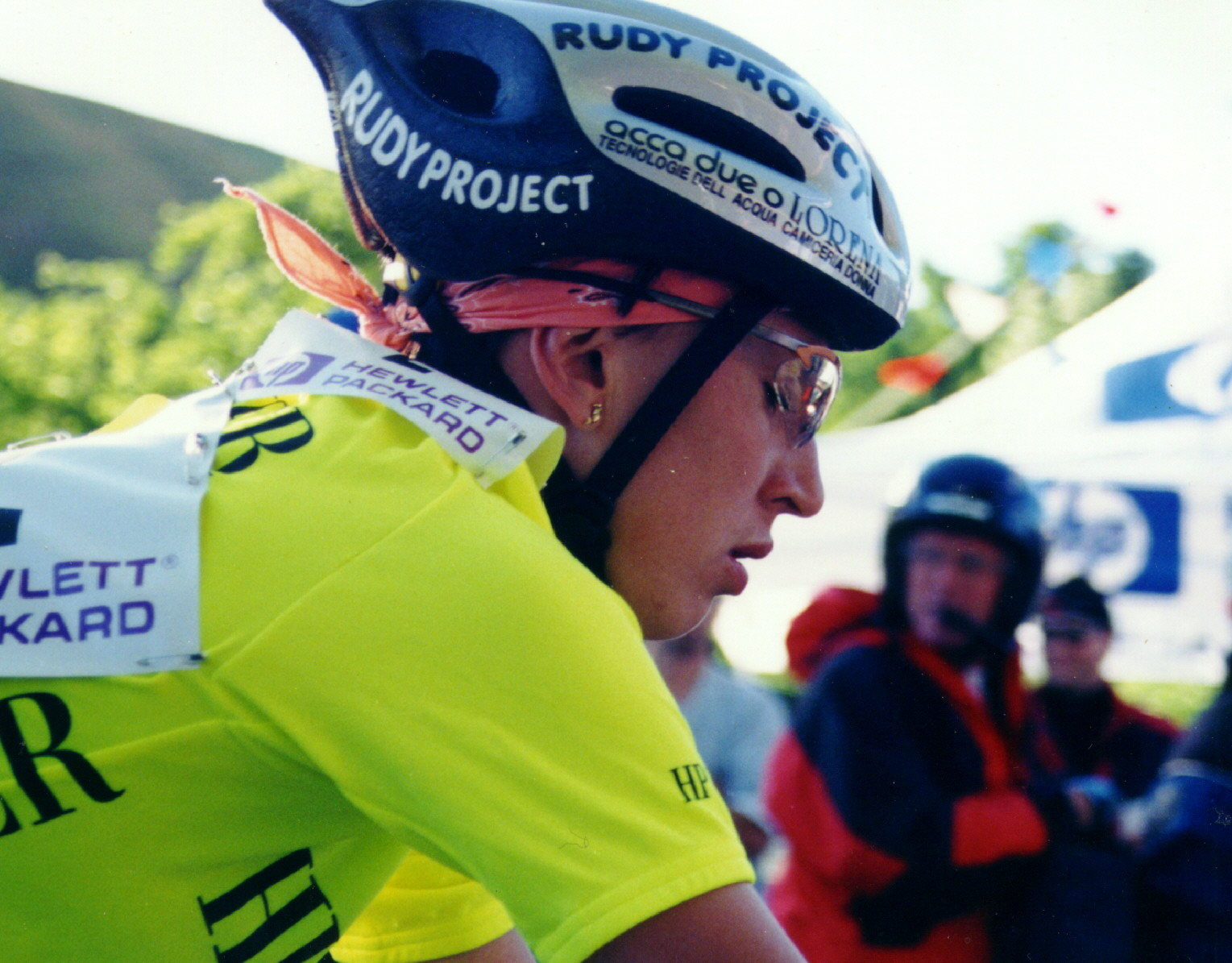
Zulfiya Zabirova won the inaugural Tour of Flanders for Women.

Result
Rank	Rider	Team	Time
1	Zulfiya Zabirova (RUS)	Team Let's Go Finland	2h 26' 00"
2	Trixi Worrack (GER)	Equipe Nürnberger Versicherung	+ 4"
3	Leontien Zijlaard-van Moorsel (NED)	Team Farm Frites-Hartol	+ 4"
4	Mirjam Melchers (NED)	Team Farm Frites-Hartol	+ 7"
5	Olga Slyusareva (RUS)	Nobili Rubinetterie-Guerciotti	+ 1' 20"
6	Alison Wright (AUS)	Nobili Rubinetterie-Guerciotti	+ 1' 20"
7	Loes Gunnewijk (NED)	Vrienden Van Het Platteland	+ 1' 20"
8	Oenone Wood (AUS)	-	+ 1' 20"
9	Joanne Kiesanowski (NZL)	-	+ 1' 20"
10	Annette Beutler (SUI)	Lietzsport Cycling	+ 1' 20"
