= Kruisberg =

Coordinates: 50.7577°N 3.5905°E

- Location: Flanders; Belgium
- Start: Ronse
- Gain in altitude: 90 m (300 ft)
- Length of climb: 1.0 km (0.62 mi)
- Maximum elevation: 122 m (400 ft)
- Average gradient: 6 %
- Maximum gradient: 9.8 %

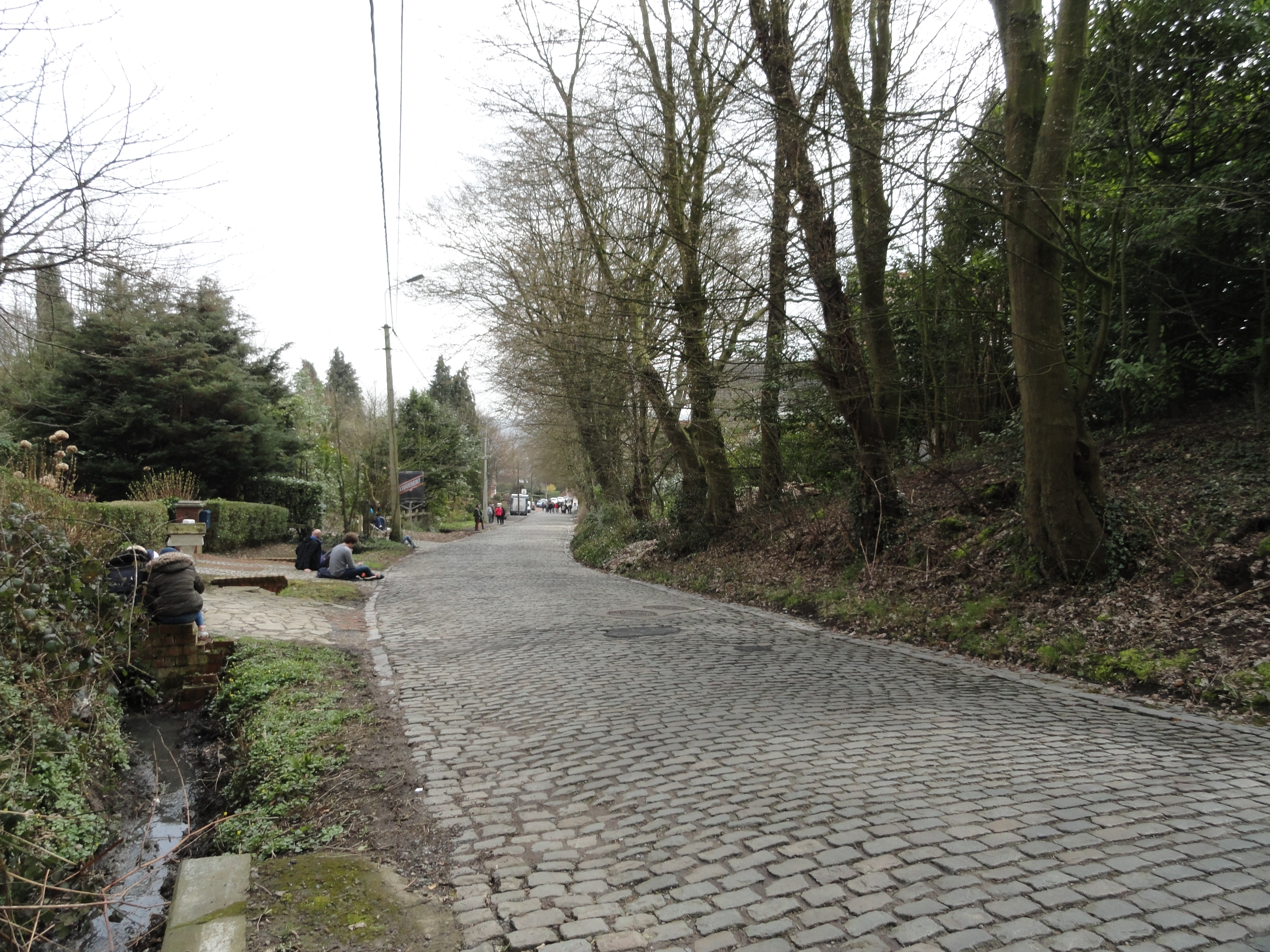
Kruisberg, 2018

The Kruisberg, also known as Oude Kruisberg or Oude Kruisens, is a hill and road in the city of Ronse, in Flanders, Belgium. With its top at 122 m altitude, it is one of many hill formations in the Flemish Ardennes, in the south of East-Flanders. The road starts going gently uphill from the center of Ronse. The upper and steepest part of the climb consists of 450 m of cobbled surface.

Kruisberg is the unofficial name of the Oudestraat and Oude Kruisens roads, which run parallel to Ronse's actual Kruisberg, a broad concrete road. Hence the climb is frequently referred to as Oude Kruisberg. In Flemish media the climb is often erroneously called Oude Kruiskens – with k. The Kruisberg should not be confused with the Kluisberg, a nearby hill and forest in the neighbouring municipality of Kluisbergen.

== Cycling ==
The climb is best known from road bicycle racing, as it regularly features in the spring classics, most notably the Tour of Flanders. The 1.000 m climb starts going gently uphill from the center of Ronse. The upper – and steepest – part of the climb has a roughly paved cobbled surface, totaling 450 m of cobbles. After the cobbled section, the road continues on a 23 m elevation on a broad gently sloped asphalt road to the top of the Hotond hill which overlooks the city. In the Tour of Flanders roadbook, the climb is categorized as Kruisberg–Hotond; the total distance of the double climb is 2.500 m at an average gradient of 5%.

The climb was first included in the Tour of Flanders route in 1973 and has become a fixed location in the route since the race's restyling in 2012. In recent years, it comes at 26 km from the finish in Oudenaarde, as the last climb before the iconic Oude Kwaremont and Paterberg climbs.

The Kruisberg is also regularly included in the Three Days of De Panne, E3 Harelbeke and the Tour of Flanders for Women.
