= 2015 Tour of Flanders for Women =

2015 Tour of Flanders
2015 UCI Women's Road World Cup, race 3 of 10

Race details
- Dates: 5 April 2015
- Distance: 144.9 km (90.0 mi)
- Winning time: 3h 50' 43"

Results
	Winner	Elisa Longo Borghini (ITA)	(Wiggle–Honda)
	Second	Jolien D'Hoore (BEL)	(Wiggle–Honda)
	Third	Anna van der Breggen (NED)	(Rabobank-Liv Woman Cycling Team)

UCI Report

The 2015 Tour of Flanders for Women was the 12th running of the Tour of Flanders for Women, a women's bicycle race in Belgium. It was the third race of the 2015 UCI Women's Road World Cup season and was held on 5 April 2015 over a distance of 144.9 kilometres (90.0 miles), starting and finishing in Oudenaarde.

Italian Elisa Longo Borghini won the race with an attack just before the Kruisberg, 30 kilometres (19 miles) from the finish. Jolien D'Hoore won the sprint for second, Anna van der Breggen was third.

== Results ==
=== Race results ===
Result
Rank	Rider	Team	Time
1	Elisa Longo Borghini (ITA)	Wiggle–Honda	3h 50' 43"
2	Jolien D'Hoore (BEL)	Wiggle–Honda	+ 43"
3	Anna van der Breggen (NED)	Rabobank-Liv Woman Cycling Team	+ 43"
4	Annemiek van Vleuten (NED)	Bigla Pro Cycling Team	+ 43"
5	Elena Cecchini (ITA)	Lotto–Soudal Ladies	+ 43"
6	Alena Amialiusik (BLR)	Velocio–SRAM	+ 43"
7	Pauline Ferrand-Prévot (FRA)	Rabobank-Liv Woman Cycling Team	+ 43"
8	Lizzie Armitstead (GBR)	Boels–Dolmans	+ 45"
9	Chantal Blaak (NED)	Boels–Dolmans	+ 47"
10	Ashleigh Moolman (RSA)	Bigla Pro Cycling Team	+ 47"

=== World Cup standings ===
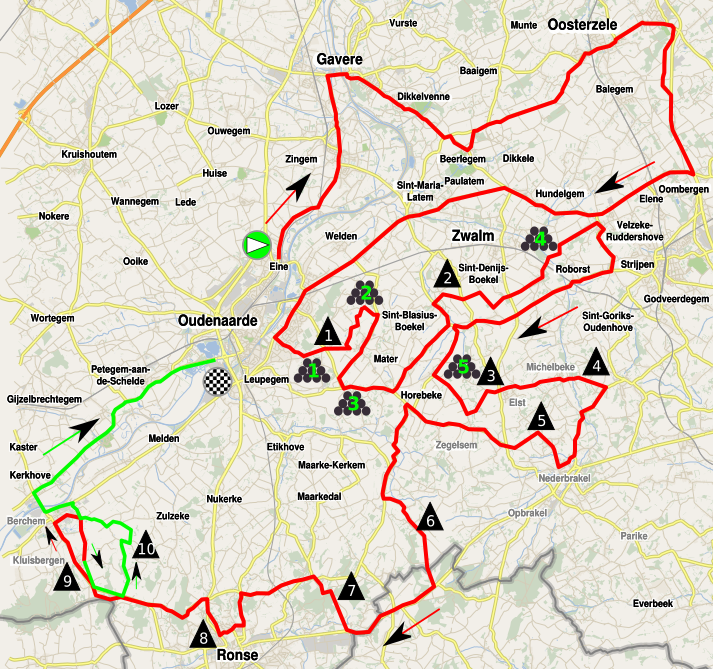
Map of the Tour of Flanders for Women 2015. Final in green.

Individual ranking after 3 of 10 World Cup races
Rank	Rider	Team	Points
1	Jolien D'Hoore (BEL)	Wiggle–Honda	220
2	Lizzie Armitstead (GBR)	Boels–Dolmans	195
3	Elisa Longo Borghini (ITA)	Wiggle–Honda	190
4	Anna van der Breggen (NED)	Rabobank-Liv Woman Cycling Team	170
5	Pauline Ferrand-Prévot (FRA)	Rabobank-Liv Woman Cycling Team	140
6	Annemiek van Vleuten (NED)	Bigla Pro Cycling Team	126
7	Ellen van Dijk (NED)	Boels–Dolmans	120
8	Alena Amialiusik (BLR)	Velocio–SRAM	110
9	Elena Cecchini (ITA)	Lotto–Soudal Ladies	104
10	Amy Pieters (NED)	Team Liv–Plantur	100
