= Sabrina Emmasi =

Swiss cyclist

Personal information
- Born: Switzerland

Cycling career
- Sport: Cycling
- Discipline: Road cycling

Sabrina Emmasi is a road cyclist from Switzerland. She represented her nation at the 2006 UCI Road World Championships.
