= Paterberg =

Hill in Belgium

Coordinates: 50.782343°N 3.546659°E

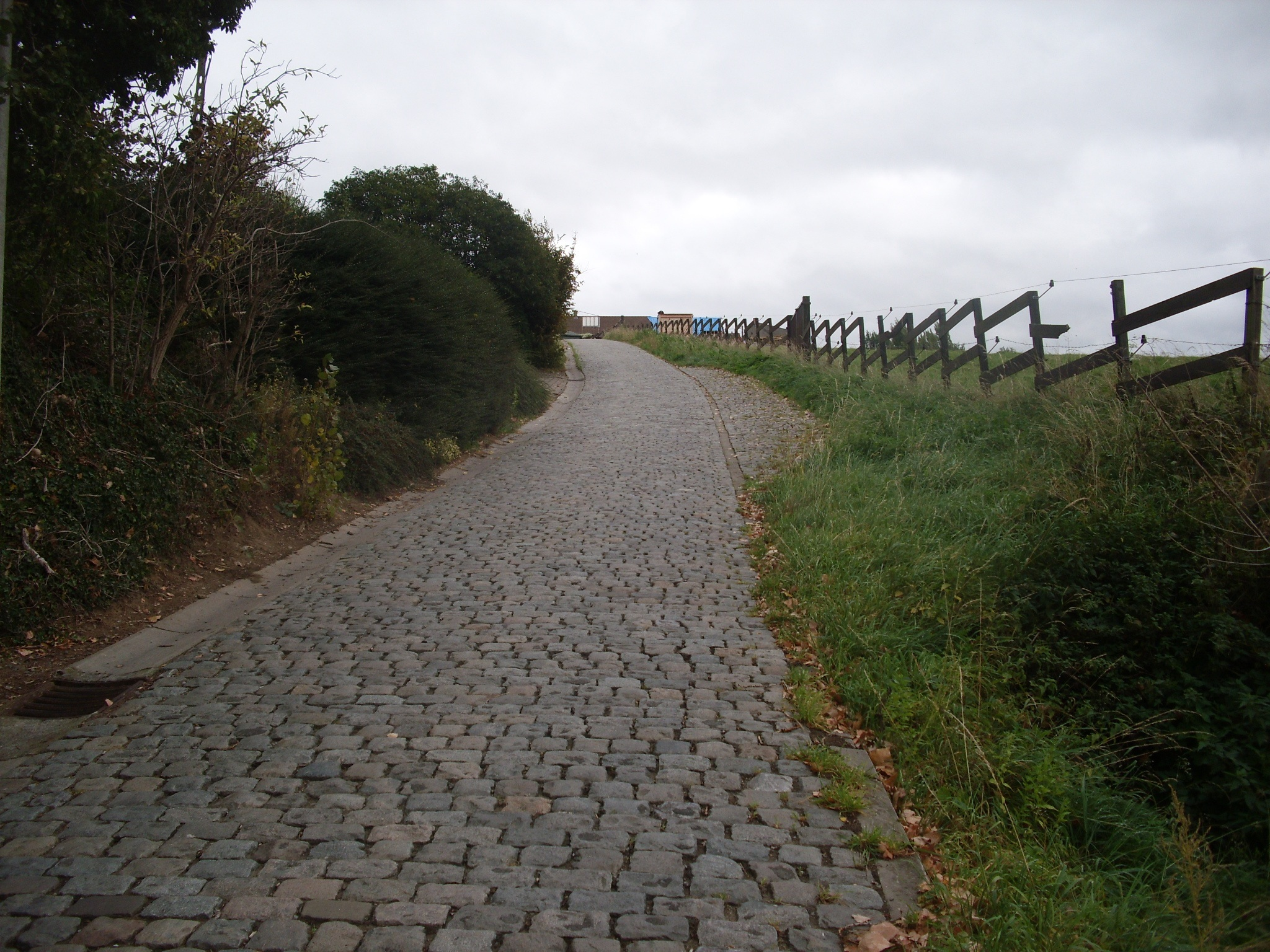
- Paterberg in Kluisbergen
- Location: Flanders, Belgium
- Start: Kluisbergen
- Gain in altitude: 48 m (157 ft)
- Length of climb: 400 m (1,300 ft)
- Maximum elevation: 80 m (260 ft)
- Average gradient: 12.5 %
- Maximum gradient: 20 %

The Paterberg is a hill in the municipality of Kluisbergen, in the Belgian province of East Flanders. With its top at 80 m, it is one of many hill formations in the Flemish Ardennes, close to Wallonia. The slopes of the hill were unpaved until 1986, when a local farmer paved the road in cobbles because he wanted the Tour of Flanders cycling race to pass by his house. The cobbled climb became one of the iconic sites of Belgian cycling, and in 1993 the road of the Paterberg was classified as a protected monument.

== Cycling ==
The hill is best known from road bicycle racing, where it is a regular climb in the Flemish races in spring, most notably the Tour of Flanders. Together with the Koppenberg and Oude Kwaremont it is one of the most arduous climbs in the region, because of its steep slopes and narrow cobbled road. Its average gradient is 12,5% with its steepest point, 20%, stretching for more than 100 m.

The Paterberg was included in the Tour of Flanders every time since its first inclusion in 1986, a record it shares only with the Kwaremont. Until 2011 it was usually part of a trio of climbs in the race trajectory, located in between the Oude Kwaremont and Koppenberg, but far before the finish. Since 2012 it is the ultimate climb of the Tour of Flanders, as part of the restyling of the race. Riders needed to climb the hill three times in 2012 and 2013 and two times as from 2014. Because of its place as ultimate difficulty, it often marks the decisive site of the race. For instance, in 2013 and 2016 Fabian Cancellara resp. Peter Sagan dropped their last companions here on their way to winning the race.

The Paterberg is also regularly included in the E3 Harelbeke and Dwars door Vlaanderen, as well as in the Tour of Flanders for Women.

== Gallery ==
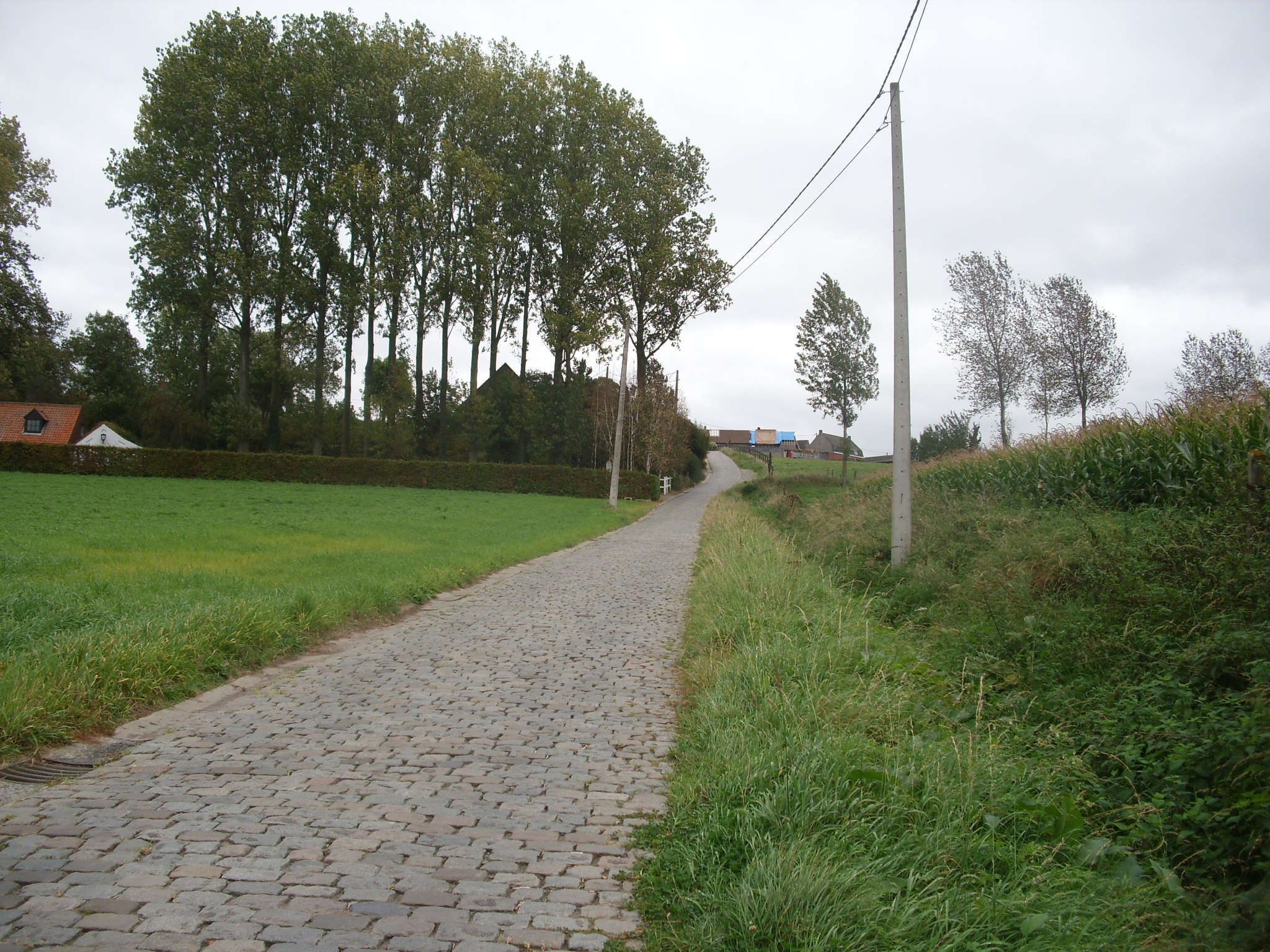
Paterberg in Kluisbergen

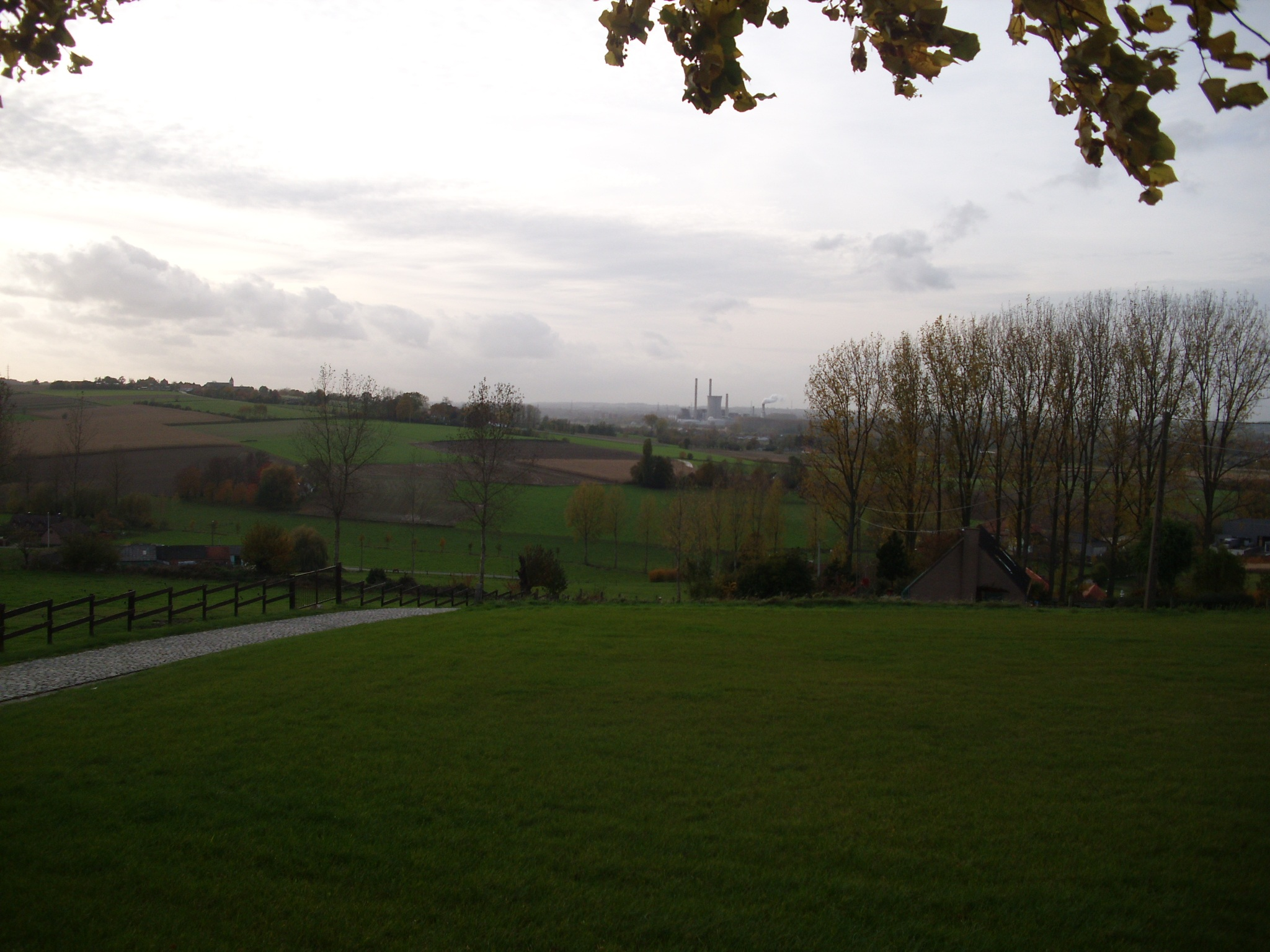
View from the top

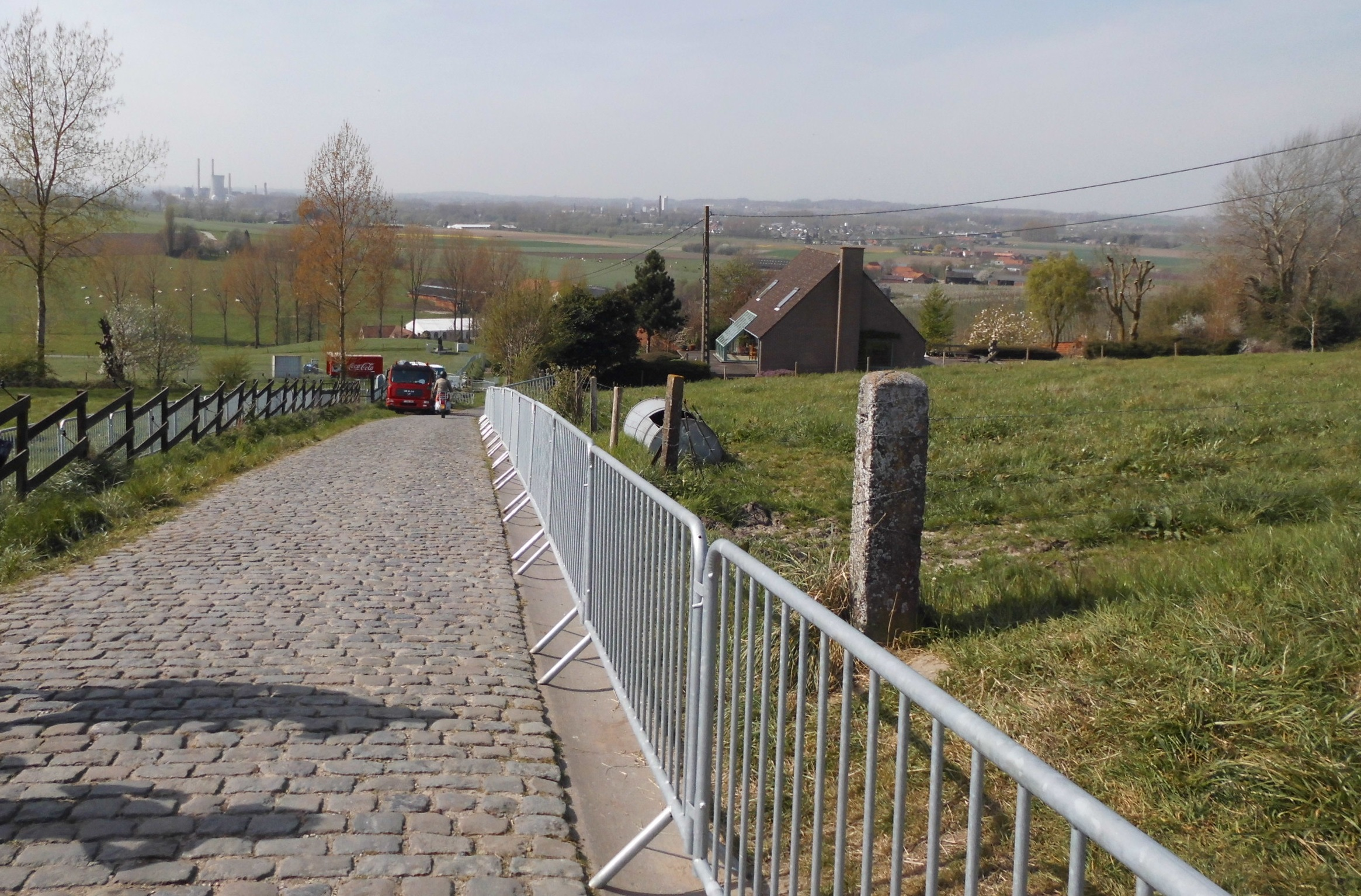
Balustrades being placed before the 2014 Tour of Flanders

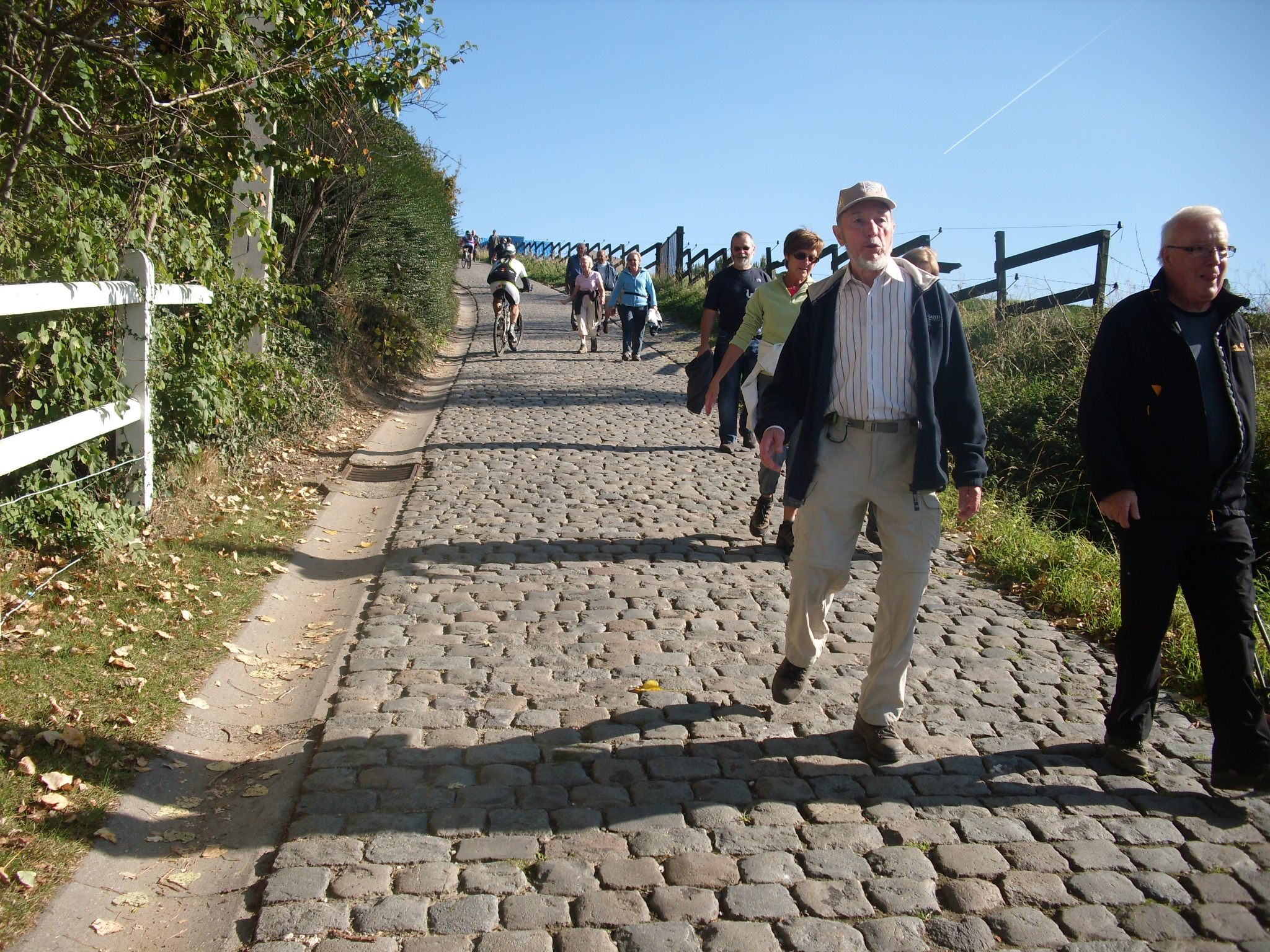
View towards the top

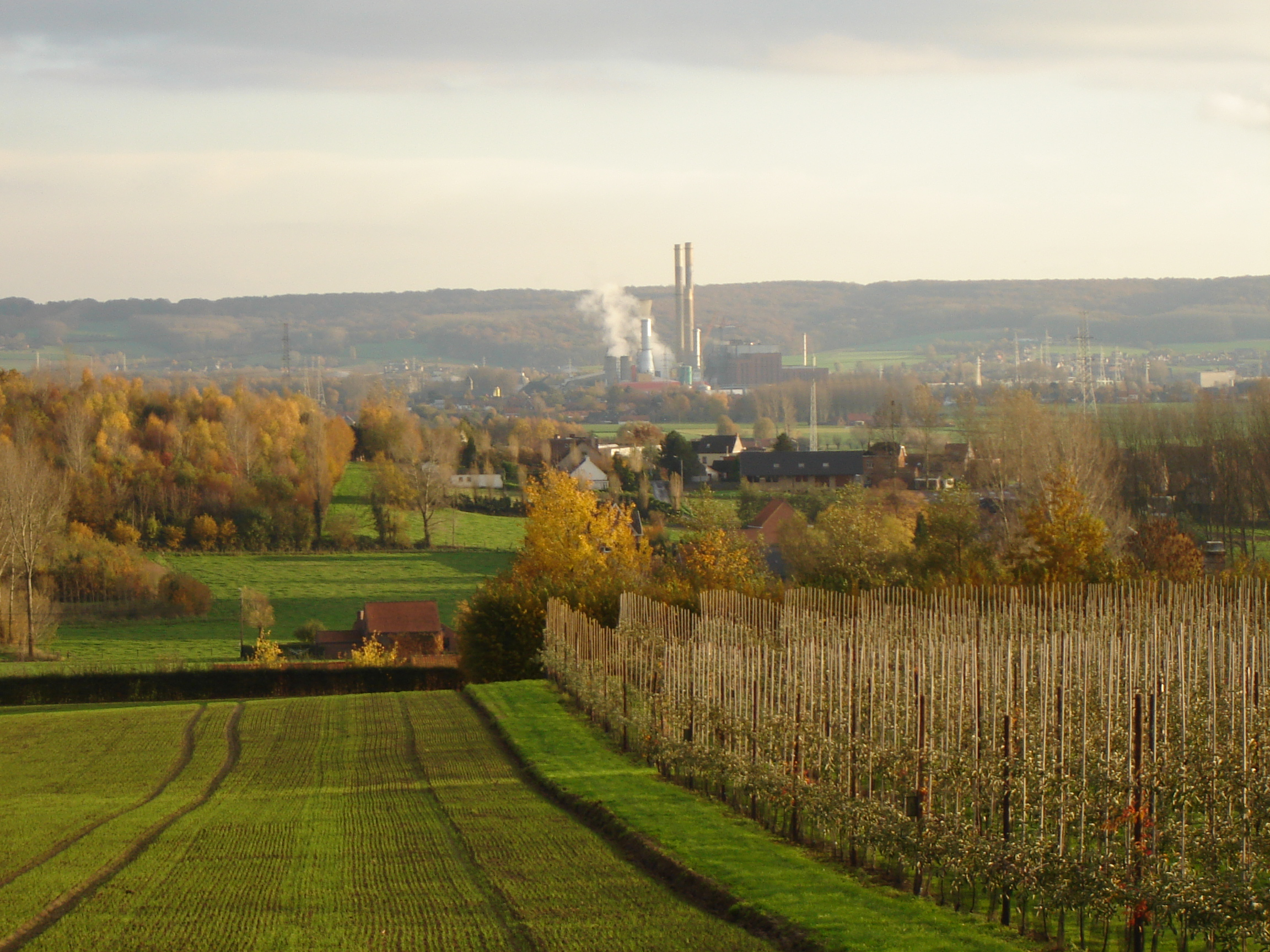
View on the Paterberg hill from Tiegemberg
