= Oude Kwaremont =

Road in East Flanders, Belgium

Coordinates: 50.787°N 3.524°E

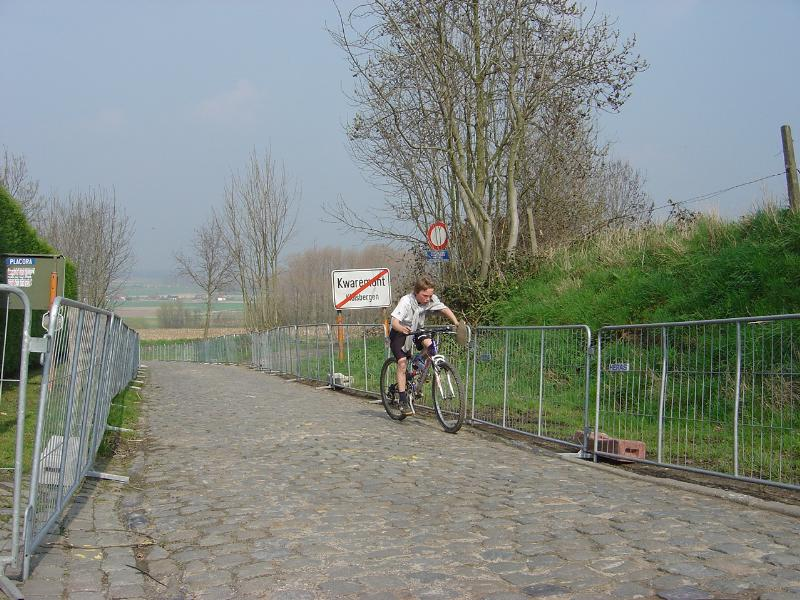
- Oude Kwaremont
- Location: Kluisbergen; Flanders; Belgium
- Start: Kluisbergen
- Gain in altitude: 93 m (305 ft)
- Length of climb: 2.2 km (1.4 mi)
- Maximum elevation: 111 m (364 ft)
- Average gradient: 4.2 %
- Maximum gradient: 11 %

The Oude Kwaremont (English: Old Kwaremont) is a road in Kluisbergen, a municipality in the Belgian province of East Flanders. The Oude Kwaremont, contrary to popular belief, is not the name of a hill, but the name of one of the cobbled roads leading up the Kluisberg hill. The Kluisberg is one of several hill formations in the Flemish Ardennes in the south of East-Flanders, close to the border with Wallonia. The climbing road is best known for its presence in many Flemish professional cycling races, such as the Tour of Flanders, E3 Harelbeke and Dwars door Vlaanderen.

== Characteristics ==
The lower 600 m of the climb consist of a narrow asphalt road, the upper 1600 m are paved with cobblestones. The first 500 m of cobbled section are particularly difficult, it is the steepest and narrowest part of the climb with a bad, very uneven cobbled surface. Halfway up the climb, near the church of Kwaremont village, the gradient gradually levels out from 11% to just 2%, but with still a cobbled kilometer to go to the top. The top is situated just after the cobbled section, at 111 m, after a 93 m altitude gain.

Despite its iconic status in Flemish cycling, the climb was only first included in the Tour of Flanders in 1974. Before, the hill was climbed via the main road from Berchem to Ronse (N36), running in parallel, whose cobbled surface was replaced in the late 1960s by an asphalt road. Since 1974 the ascent of this road from Berchem is called Nieuwe Kwaremont for distinction.

When the parcours of the Tour of Flanders was restyled in 2012, the Oude Kwaremont, together with the nearby Paterberg, became the cornerstone of the race. The Oude Kwaremont is now climbed three times, being the first and penultimate of the serious climbs, and often the one that forces the greatest selection. For instance, Niki Terpstra in 2018 and Alberto Bettiol in 2019 shook off their last remaining competitors on the Oude Kwaremont to win solo in Oudenaarde.

The cobbles of the Oude Kwaremont have been classified as monuments by Flemish decree since 1993.

== Gallery ==
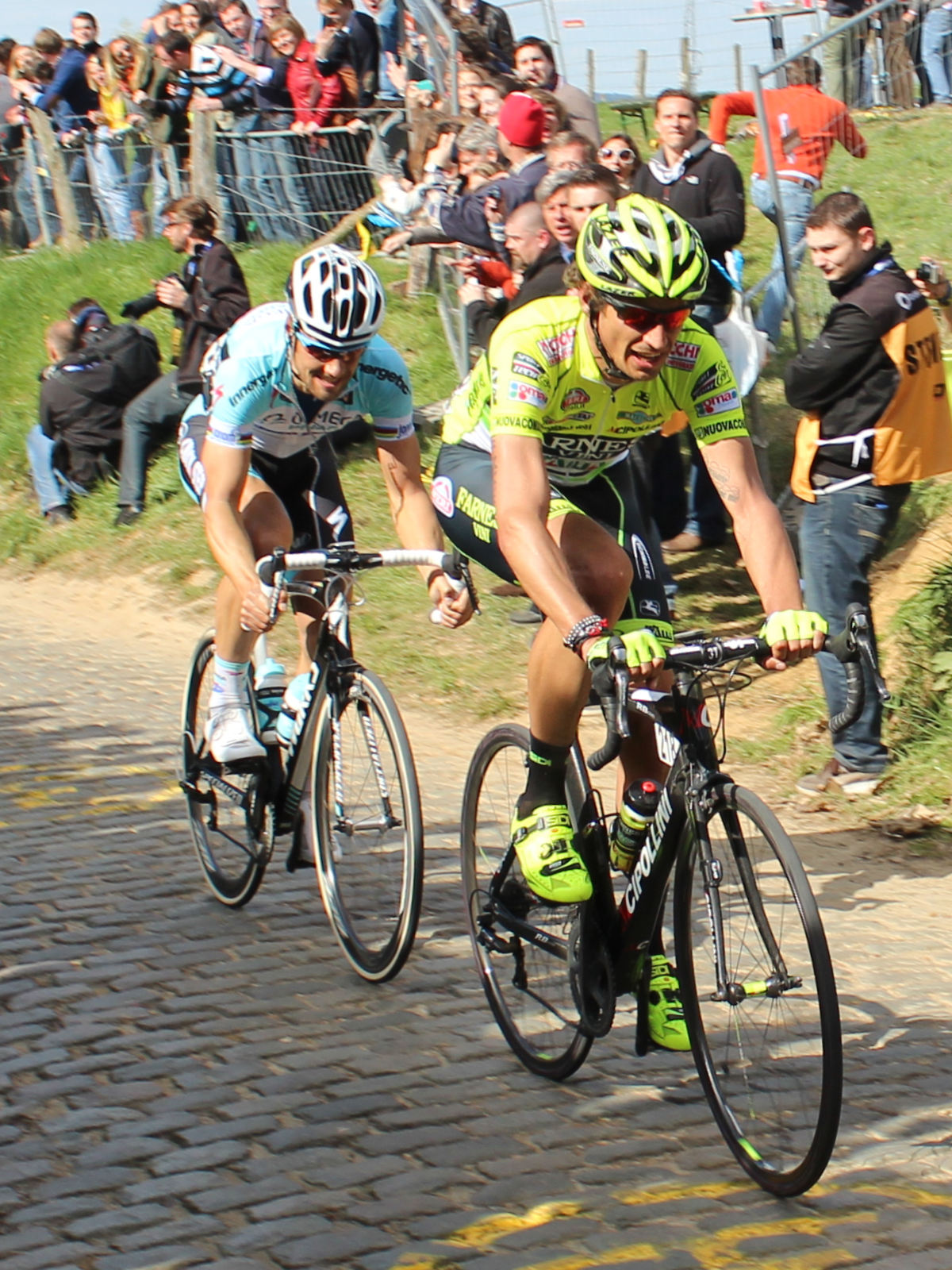
Filippo Pozzato and Tom Boonen riding up Oude Kwaremont in the 2012 Tour of Flanders

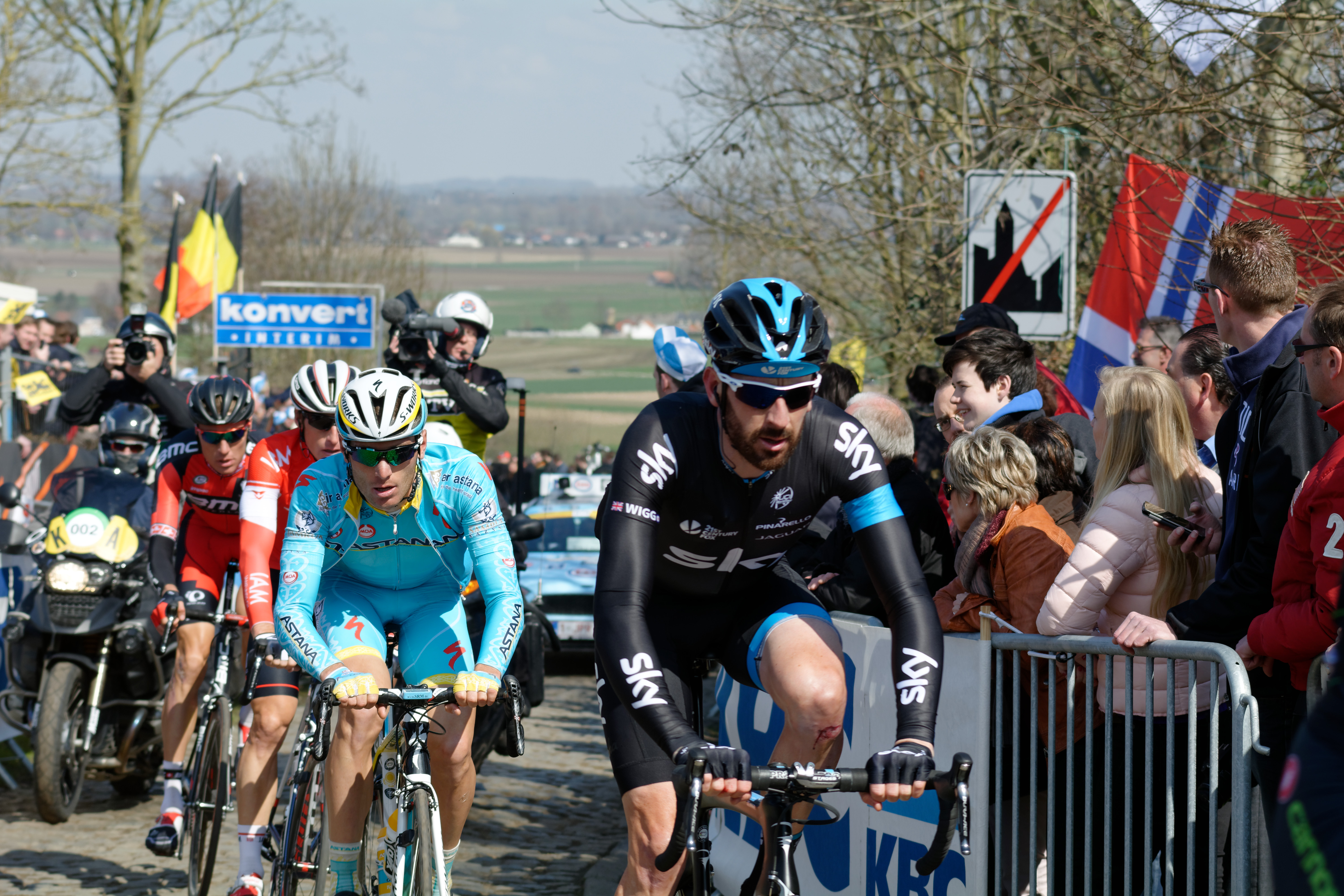
Bradley Wiggins leads a small group at Oude Kwaremont during the 2015 Tour of Flanders

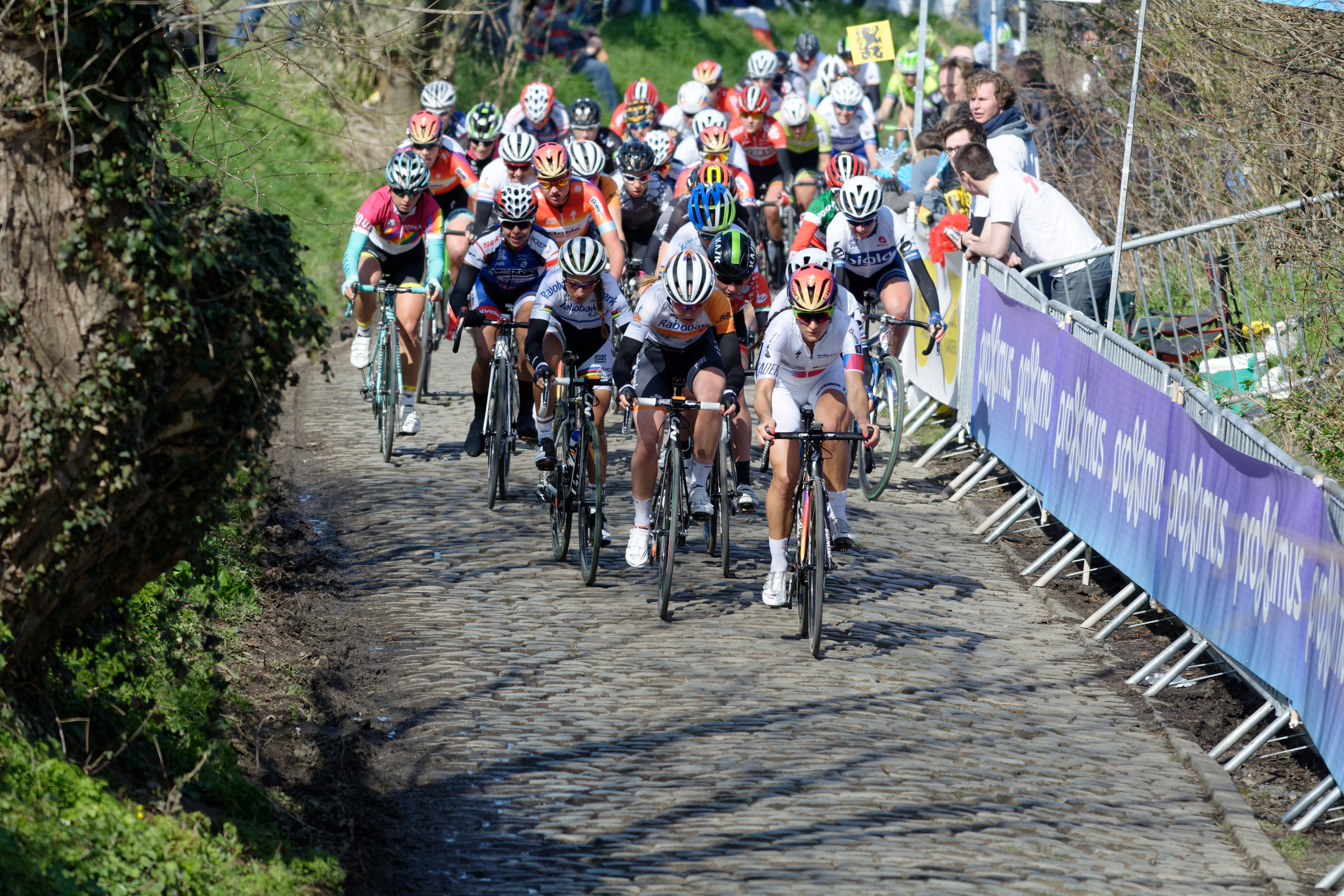
The women's peloton during the 2015 Tour of Flanders for Women

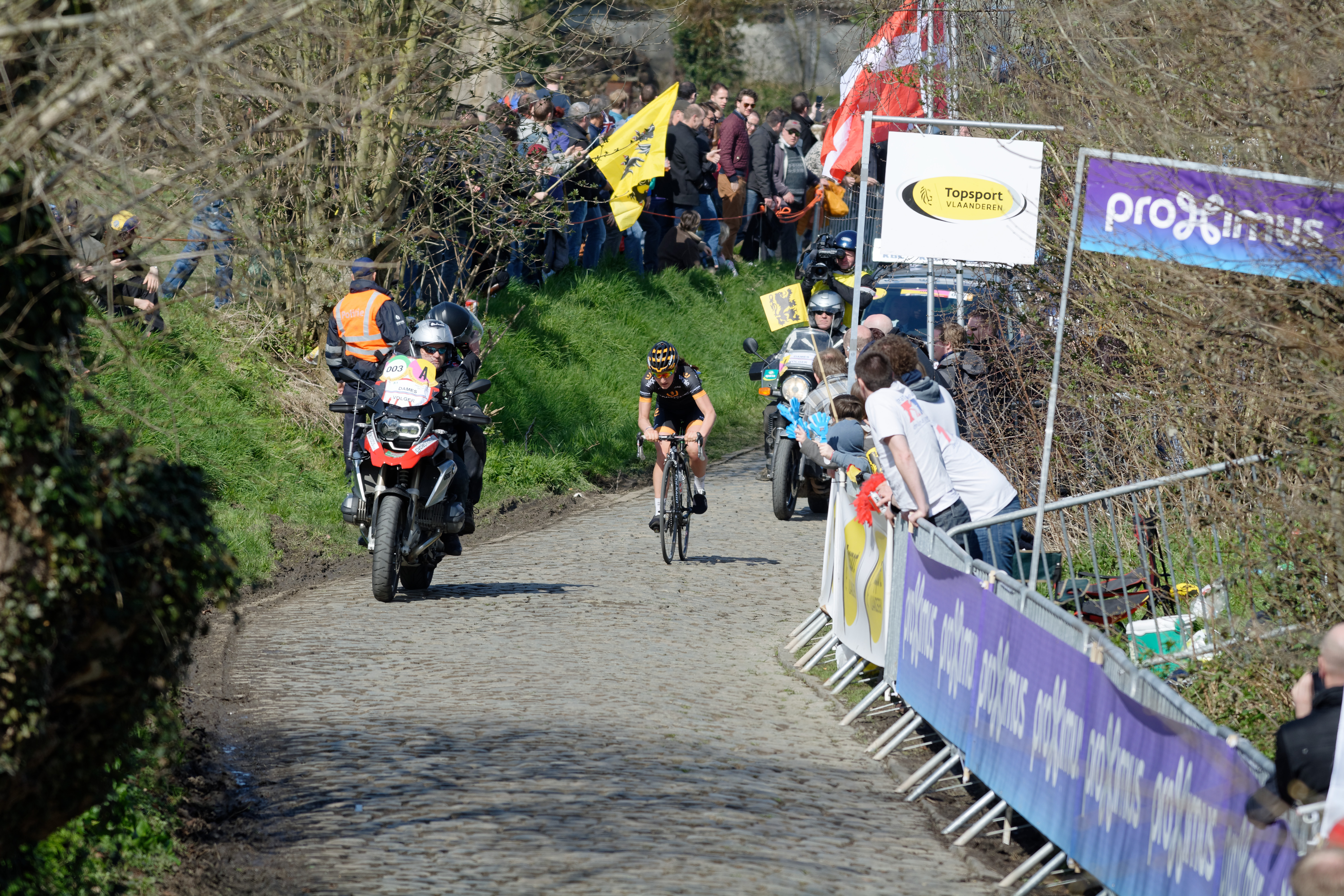
Elisa Longo Borghini on her way to victory in the 2015 Tour of Flanders for Women

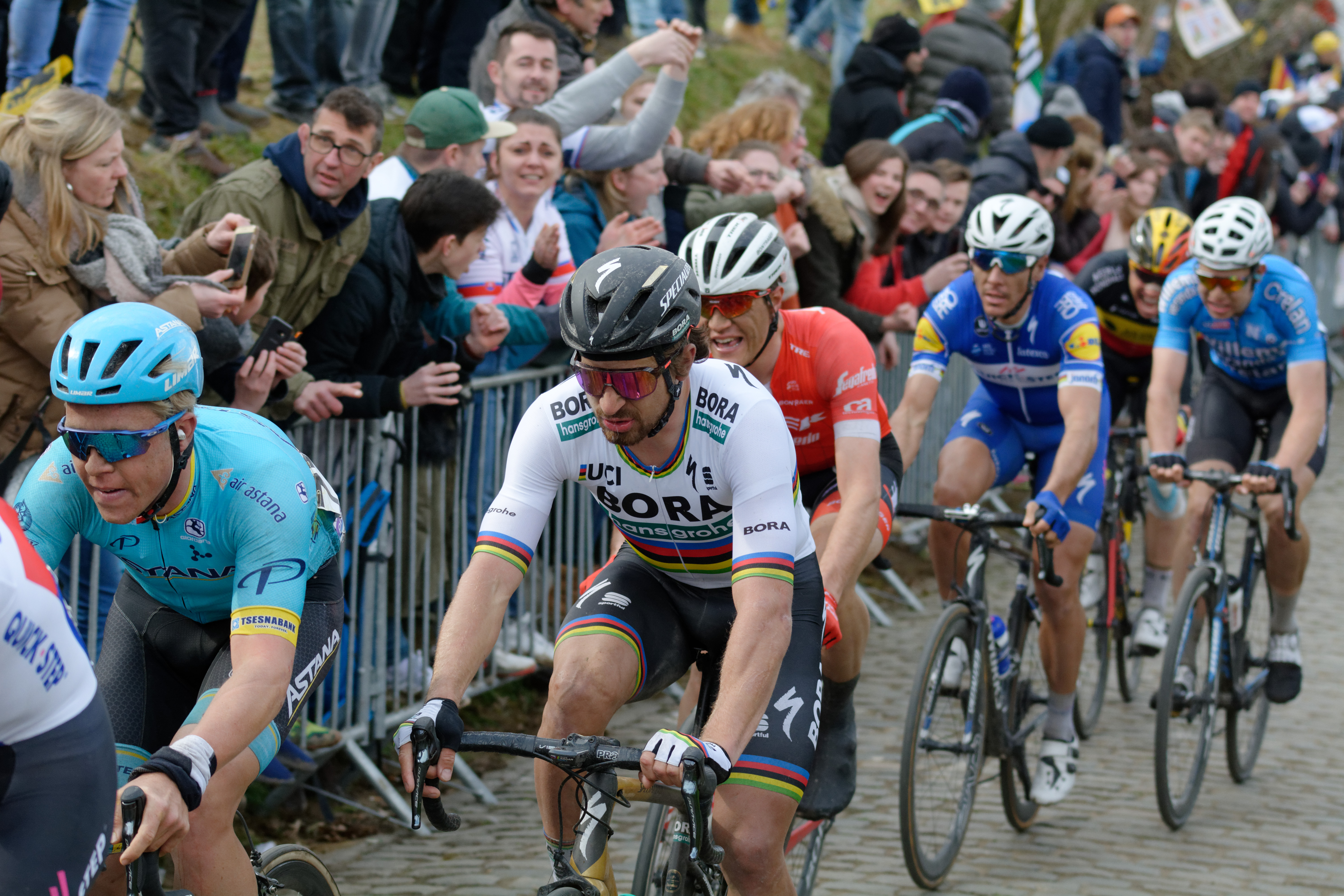
Michael Valgren, Peter Sagan, Philippe Gilbert and Wout Van Aert at 2018 Tour of Flanders
