= 2017 UCI Track Cycling World Championships – Women's scratch =

Women's scratch at the 2017 UCI Track Cycling World Championships
- Venue: Hong Kong Velodrome
- Location: Hong Kong
- Date: 12 April
- Competitors: 22 from 22 nations

Medalists
gold medal	Rachele Barbieri	Italy
silver medal	Elinor Barker	Great Britain
bronze medal	Jolien D'Hoore	Belgium

The Women's scratch competition at the 2017 World Championships was held on 12 April 2017.

== Results ==
First rider across the line without a net lap loss wins.

Rank	Name	Nation	Laps down
1st place, gold medalist(s)	Rachele Barbieri	Italy	
2nd place, silver medalist(s)	Elinor Barker	Great Britain	
3rd place, bronze medalist(s)	Jolien D'Hoore	Belgium	
4	Sarah Hammer	United States	
5	Kirsten Wild	Netherlands	
6	Jasmin Duehring	Canada	
7	Huang Li	China	−1
8	Diao Xiao Juan	Hong Kong	−1
9	Kristina Clonan	Australia	−1
10	Roxane Fournier	France	−1
11	Tetyana Klimchenko	Ukraine	−1
12	Alžbeta Pavlendová	Slovakia	−1
13	Lucie Hochmann	Czech Republic	−1
14	Ana Usabiaga	Spain	−1
15	Lydia Gurley	Ireland	−1
16	Anita Stenberg	Norway	−1
17	Evgenia Romanyuta	Russia	−1
18	Verena Eberhardt	Austria	−1
19	Justyna Kaczkowska	Poland	−1
20	Aušrinė Trebaitė	Lithuania	−1
21	Minami Uwano	Japan	−1
	Tatjana Paller	Germany	DNF
