= 2017 UCI Track Cycling World Championships – Women's omnium =

Women's omnium at the 2017 UCI Track Cycling World Championships
- Venue: Hong Kong Velodrome
- Location: Hong Kong
- Dates: 14 April
- Competitors: 22 from 22 nations
- Winning points: 123

Medalists
gold medal	Katie Archibald	Great Britain
silver medal	Kirsten Wild	Netherlands
bronze medal	Amy Cure	Australia

The Women's omnium competition at the 2017 World Championships was held on 14 April 2017.

== Results ==
=== Scratch race ===
30 laps (7.5 km) were raced.

Rank	Name	Nation	Laps down	Event points
1	Katie Archibald	Great Britain		40
2	Amy Cure	Australia		38
3	Kirsten Wild	Netherlands		36
4	Elisa Balsamo	Italy		34
5	Roxane Fournier	France		32
6	Daria Pikulik	Poland		30
7	Sarah Hammer	United States		28
8	Lotte Kopecky	Belgium		26
9	Michaela Drummond	New Zealand		24
10	Alžbeta Pavlendová	Slovakia		22
11	Lydia Boylan	Ireland		20
12	Pang Yao	Hong Kong		18
13	Ana Usabiaga	Spain		16
14	Olivija Baleišytė	Lithuania		14
15	Stephanie Roorda	Canada		12
16	Yumi Kajihara	Japan		10
17	Tetyana Klimchenko	Ukraine		8
18	Anita Stenberg	Norway		6
19	Tatjana Paller	Germany		4
20	Jarmila Machačová	Czech Republic		2
21	Zeng Ke Xin	Chinese Taipei		1
22	Luo Xiaoling	China	REL^{[A]}	1

- ^{^{A}} Luo Xiaolong was relegated "for not returning to the bunch in the same location after her crash and not being in the bunch in the final kilometer"

=== Tempo race ===
27 sprints were held, each awarding a point to the winner; in addition, 20 points were added/subtracted for a lap gain/loss respectively.

Rank	Name	Nation	Points in race	Finish order	Event points	Overall rank	Subtotal
1	Katie Archibald	Great Britain	24	2	40	1	80
2	Sarah Hammer	United States	23	7	38	4	66
3	Stephanie Roorda	Canada	23	14	36	8	48
4	Amy Cure	Australia	22	4	34	2	72
5	Kirsten Wild	Netherlands	22	8	32	3	68
6	Elisa Balsamo	Italy	22	18	30	5	64
7	Yumi Kajihara	Japan	21	13	28	11	38
8	Michaela Drummond	New Zealand	20	5	26	7	50
9	Daria Pikulik	Poland	20	12	24	6	54
10	Lydia Boylan	Ireland	7	1	22	10	42
11	Anita Stenberg	Norway	1	11	20	14	26
12	Tetyana Klimchenko	Ukraine	1	20	18	15	26
13	Alžbeta Pavlendová	Slovakia	1	22	16	12	38
14	Luo Xiaoling	China	0	3	14	19	15
15	Roxane Fournier	France	0	6	12	9	44
16	Ana Usabiaga	Spain	0	9	10	16	26
17	Lotte Kopecky	Belgium	0	10	8	13	34
18	Jarmila Machačová	Czech Republic	0	15	6	20	8
19	Pang Yao	Hong Kong	0	16	4	17	22
20	Olivija Baleišytė	Lithuania	0	17	2	18	16
21	Tatjana Paller	Germany	0	19	1	21	5
22	Zeng Ke Xin	Chinese Taipei	0	21	1	22	2

=== Elimination race ===
Sprints were held every two laps; the last rider in each sprint was eliminated.

Rank	Name	Nation	Event points	Overall rank	Subtotal
1	Amy Cure	Australia	40	1	112
2	Kirsten Wild	Netherlands	38	3	106
3	Daria Pikulik	Poland	36	5	90
4	Lotte Kopecky	Belgium	34	9	68
5	Katie Archibald	Great Britain	32	2	112
6	Sarah Hammer	United States	30	4	96
7	Roxane Fournier	France	28	7	72
8	Ana Usabiaga	Spain	26	12	52
9	Tetyana Klimchenko	Ukraine	24	13	50
10	Michaela Drummond	New Zealand	22	8	72
11	Elisa Balsamo	Italy	20	6	84
12	Alžbeta Pavlendová	Slovakia	18	10	56
13	Pang Yao	Hong Kong	16	17	38
14	Anita Stenberg	Norway	14	15	40
15	Lydia Boylan	Ireland	12	11	54
16	Jarmila Machačová	Czech Republic	10	20	18
17	Luo Xiaoling	China	8	18	23
18	Tatjana Paller	Germany	6	21	11
19	Olivija Baleišytė	Lithuania	4	19	20
20	Stephanie Roorda	Canada	2	14	50
21	Yumi Kajihara	Japan	1	16	39
22	Zeng Ke Xin	Chinese Taipei	1	22	3

=== Points race and final standings ===
Riders' points from the previous 3 events were carried into the points race (consisting of 80 laps (20km)), in which the final standings were decided.

Overall rank	Name	Nation	Subtotal	Sprint points	Lap points	Finish order	Final standings
1st place, gold medalist(s)	Katie Archibald	Great Britain	112	11	0	4	123
2nd place, silver medalist(s)	Kirsten Wild	Netherlands	106	9	0	7	115
3rd place, bronze medalist(s)	Amy Cure	Australia	112	3^{[B]}	0	9	115
4	Daria Pikulik	Poland	90	20	0	1	110
5	Sarah Hammer	United States	96	6	0	3	102
6	Lotte Kopecky	Belgium	68	8	20	16	96
7	Elisa Balsamo	Italy	84	3	0	6	76
8	Michaela Drummond	New Zealand	72	4	0	5	76
9	Lydia Boylan	Ireland	54	2	20	8	76
10	Roxane Fournier	France	72	0	0	11	72
11	Yumi Kajihara	Japan	39	8	20	21	67
12	Tetyana Klimchenko	Ukraine	56	6	0	2	56
13	Alžbeta Pavlendová	Slovakia	50	0	0	17	56
14	Ana Usabiaga	Spain	52	3	0	18	55
15	Anita Stenberg	Norway	40	9	0	10	49
16	Luo Xiaoling	China	23	3	20	19	46
17	Pang Yao	Hong Kong	38	1	0	15	39
18	Olivija Baleišytė	Lithuania	20	3	0	20	23
19	Jarmila Machačová	Czech Republic	18	0	0	12	18
20	Tatjana Paller	Germany	11	0	0	13	11
21	Zeng Ke Xin	Chinese Taipei	3	0	0	14	3
—	Stephanie Roorda	Canada	50	—	—	—	DNF

- ^{^{B}} Amy Cure was relegated in sprint 7 "for irregular movement to prevent [her] opponent from passing"
