= 2017 UCI Track Cycling World Championships – Women's points race =

Women's points race at the 2017 UCI Track Cycling World Championships
- Venue: Hong Kong Velodrome
- Location: Hong Kong
- Dates: 16 April
- Competitors: 22 from 22 nations
- Winning points: 59

Medalists
gold medal	Elinor Barker	Great Britain
silver medal	Sarah Hammer	United States
bronze medal	Kirsten Wild	Netherlands

The Women's points race competition at the 2017 World Championships was held on 16 April 2017.

== Results ==
The race was started at 14:12.

Rank	Name	Nation	Lap points	Sprint points	Total points
1st place, gold medalist(s)	Elinor Barker	Great Britain	40	19	59
2nd place, silver medalist(s)	Sarah Hammer	United States	40	11	51
3rd place, bronze medalist(s)	Kirsten Wild	Netherlands	20	15	35
4	Lotte Kopecky	Belgium	20	3	23
5	Charlotte Becker	Germany	0	16	16
6	Jasmin Duehring	Canada	0	9	9
7	Giorgia Bronzini	Italy	0	8	8
8	Gulnaz Badykova	Russia	0	7	7
9	Aušrinė Trebaitė	Lithuania	0	6	6
10	Anita Stenberg	Norway	0	5	5
11	Amy Cure	Australia	0	5	5
12	Verena Eberhardt	Austria	0	3	3
13	Alžbeta Pavlendová	Slovakia	0	2	2
14	Racquel Sheath	New Zealand	0	2	2
15	Lydia Gurley	Ireland	0	2	2
16	Anna Nahirna	Ukraine	0	1	1
17	Élise Delzenne	France	0	1	1
18	Ana Usabiaga	Spain	0	0	0
19	Jarmila Machačová	Czech Republic	0	0	0
20	Yang Qianyu	Hong Kong	0	0	0
21	Natalia Rutkowska	Poland	−20	3	−17
22	Minami Uwano	Japan	−20	3	−17
