= 2022 UEC European Track Championships – Women's omnium =

Cycling competition

Women's omnium at the 2022 UEC European Track Championships
- Venue: Messe München, Munich
- Date: 15 August
- Competitors: 20 from 20 nations
- Winning points: 174

Medalists
gold medal	Rachele Barbieri	Italy
silver medal	Clara Copponi	France
bronze medal	Daria Pikulik	Poland

The women's omnium competition at the 2022 UEC European Track Championships was held on 15 August 2022.

== Results ==
=== Scratch race ===
Rank	Name	Nation	Laps down	Event points
1	Daria Pikulik	Poland		40
2	Rachele Barbieri	Italy		38
3	Emily Kay	Ireland		36
4	Clara Copponi	France		34
5	Maike van der Duin	Netherlands		32
6	Lea Lin Teutenberg	Germany		30
7	Amalie Dideriksen	Denmark		28
8	Lotte Kopecky	Belgium		26
9	Anita Stenberg	Norway		24
10	Pfeiffer Georgi	Great Britain		22
11	Aline Seitz	Switzerland		20
12	Petra Ševčíková	Czech Republic		18
13	Tania Calvo	Spain		16
14	Olivija Baleišytė	Lithuania		14
15	Verena Eberhardt	Austria		12
16	Hanna Solovey	Ukraine		10
17	Alžbeta Bačíková	Slovakia		8
18	Argiro Milaki	Greece		6
18	Johanna Kitti Borissza	Hungary		6
18	Maria Martins	Portugal		6

=== Tempo race ===
Rank	Name	Nation	Points in race	Event points
1	Clara Copponi	France	26	40
2	Daria Pikulik	Poland	25	38
3	Amalie Dideriksen	Denmark	8	36
4	Rachele Barbieri	Italy	5	34
5	Maike van der Duin	Netherlands	4	32
6	Pfeiffer Georgi	Great Britain	3	30
7	Emily Kay	Ireland	1	28
8	Lotte Kopecky	Belgium	0	26
9	Anita Stenberg	Norway	0	24
10	Maria Martins	Portugal	0	22
11	Aline Seitz	Switzerland	0	20
12	Lea Lin Teutenberg	Germany	0	18
13	Hanna Solovey	Ukraine	–17	16
14	Verena Eberhardt	Austria	–18	14
15	Petra Ševčíková	Czech Republic	–20	12
16	Tania Calvo	Spain	–20	10
17	Olivija Baleišytė	Lithuania	–20	8
18	Argiro Milaki	Greece	–20	6
19	Alžbeta Bačíková	Slovakia	–20	4
20	Johanna Kitti Borissza	Hungary	–40	2

=== Elimination race ===
Rank	Name	Nation	Event Points
1	Clara Copponi	France	40
2	Lotte Kopecky	Belgium	38
3	Pfeiffer Georgi	Great Britain	36
4	Rachele Barbieri	Italy	34
5	Daria Pikulik	Poland	32
6	Lea Lin Teutenberg	Germany	30
7	Maria Martins	Portugal	28
8	Amalie Dideriksen	Denmark	26
9	Emily Kay	Ireland	24
10	Maike van der Duin	Netherlands	22
11	Olivija Baleišytė	Lithuania	20
12	Petra Ševčíková	Czech Republic	18
13	Tania Calvo	Spain	16
14	Alžbeta Bačíková	Slovakia	14
15	Aline Seitz	Switzerland	12
16	Anita Stenberg	Norway	10
17	Argiro Milaki	Greece	8
18	Johanna Kitti Borissza	Hungary	6
19	Hanna Solovey	Ukraine	4
20	Verena Eberhardt	Austria	2

=== Points race ===
Overall rank	Name	Nation	Scratch race	Tempo race	Elim. race	Subtotal	Lap points	Sprint points	Finish order	Total points
1st place, gold medalist(s)	Rachele Barbieri	Italy	38	34	34	106	60	8	12	174
2nd place, silver medalist(s)	Clara Copponi	France	34	40	40	114	40	17	6	171
3rd place, bronze medalist(s)	Daria Pikulik	Poland	40	38	32	110	40	17	11	167
4	Lotte Kopecky	Belgium	26	26	38	90	40	3	5	133
5	Maike van der Duin	Netherlands	32	32	22	86	40	7	7	133
6	Lea Lin Teutenberg	Germany	30	18	30	78	40	8	13	126
7	Pfeiffer Georgi	Great Britain	22	30	36	88	20	16	2	124
8	Amalie Dideriksen	Denmark	28	36	26	90	20	10	1	120
9	Anita Stenberg	Norway	24	24	10	58	40	15	3	113
10	Emily Kay	Ireland	36	28	24	88	20	5	5	113
11	Maria Martins	Portugal	6	22	28	56	20	5	4	81
12	Aline Seitz	Switzerland	20	20	12	52	0	2	9	54
13	Petra Ševčíková	Czech Republic	18	12	18	48	0	0	10	48
14	Tania Calvo	Spain	16	10	16	42	0	0	6	42
15	Verena Eberhardt	Austria	12	14	2	28	0	5	11	33
16	Olivija Baleišytė	Lithuania	14	8	20	42	–20	1	10	23
17	Alžbeta Bačíková	Slovakia	8	4	14	26	–20	0	11	6
	Hanna Solovey	Ukraine	10	16	4	30		2	DNF	DNF
	Argiro Milaki	Greece	6	6	8	20		2	DNF	DNF
	Johanna Kitti Borissza	Hungary	6	2	6	14		2	DNF	DNF
