= 2018 UCI Track Cycling World Championships – Women's scratch =

Women's scratch at the 2018 UCI Track Cycling World Championships
- Venue: Omnisport Apeldoorn
- Location: Apeldoorn, Netherlands
- Dates: 28 February
- Competitors: 22 from 22 nations

Medalists
gold medal	Kirsten Wild	Netherlands
silver medal	Jolien D'Hoore	Belgium
bronze medal	Amalie Dideriksen	Denmark

The women's scratch competition at the 2018 UCI Track Cycling World Championships was held on 28 February 2018 at the Omnisport Apeldoorn in Apeldoorn, Netherlands.

== Results ==
First rider across the line without a net lap loss wins.

Rank	Name	Nation	Laps down
1st place, gold medalist(s)	Kirsten Wild	Netherlands	
2nd place, silver medalist(s)	Jolien D'Hoore	Belgium	
3rd place, bronze medalist(s)	Amalie Dideriksen	Denmark	
4	Nao Suzuki	Japan	
5	Jarmila Machačová	Czech Republic	
6	Katie Archibald	Great Britain	
7	Jasmin Duehring	Canada	
8	Evgenia Augustinas	Russia	
9	Rachele Barbieri	Italy	
10	Tetyana Klimchenko	Ukraine	
11	Verena Eberhardt	Austria	
12	Aline Seitz	Switzerland	
13	Justyna Kaczkowska	Poland	
14	Olivija Baleišytė	Lithuania	
15	Lydia Gurley	Ireland	
16	Christina Birch	United States	
17	Tatjana Paller	Germany	
18	Ane Iriarte	Spain	
19	Alžbeta Bačíková	Slovakia	
20	Valentine Fortin	France	
21	Hanna Tserakh	Belarus	
	Diao Xiaojuan	Hong Kong	DNF
