= 2016 UEC European Track Championships – Women's scratch =

Women's scratch race at the 2016 UEC European Track Championships
- UEC European Champion jersey
- Venue: Vélodrome de Saint-Quentin-en-Yvelines, Yvelines
- Date: 20 October
- Competitors: 20 from 20 nations

Medalists
gold medal	Aušrinė Trebaitė	Lithuania
silver medal	Elinor Barker	Great Britain
bronze medal	Kirsten Wild	Netherlands

The Women's scratch was held on 20 October 2016.

== Results ==
Rank	Name	Nation	Laps down
1st place, gold medalist(s)	Aušrinė Trebaitė	Lithuania	
2nd place, silver medalist(s)	Elinor Barker	Great Britain	
3rd place, bronze medalist(s)	Kirsten Wild	Netherlands	
4	Rachele Barbieri	Italy	
5	Alžbeta Pavlendová	Slovakia	
6	Laurie Berthon	France	
7	Verena Eberhardt	Austria	
8	Anita Stenberg	Norway	
9	Maryna Shmayankova	Belarus	
10	Sheyla Gutiérrez	Spain	
11	Jarmila Machačová	Czech Republic	
12	Kaat Van der Meulen	Belgium	
13	Viktoriya Bondar	Ukraine	
14	Lydia Boylan	Ireland	
15	Evgenia Romanyuta	Russia	
16	Łucja Pietrzak	Poland	
17	Sara Ferrara	Finland	DNF
18	Virginie Perizzolo Pointet	Switzerland	DNF
19	Johanna Kitti Borissza	Hungary	DNF
20	Tatjana Paller	Germany	DNF
