= 2019 UCI Track Cycling World Championships – Women's scratch =

Women's scratch at the 2019 UCI Track Cycling World Championships
- Venue: BGŻ Arena
- Location: Pruszków, Poland
- Dates: 27 February
- Competitors: 23 from 23 nations

Medalists
gold medal	Elinor Barker	Great Britain
silver medal	Kirsten Wild	Netherlands
bronze medal	Jolien D'Hoore	Belgium

The Women's scratch competition at the 2019 UCI Track Cycling World Championships was held on 27 February 2019.

== Results ==
The race was started at 19:37. First rider across the line without a net lap loss won.

Rank	Name	Nation	Laps down
1st place, gold medalist(s)	Elinor Barker	Great Britain	
2nd place, silver medalist(s)	Kirsten Wild	Netherlands	
3rd place, bronze medalist(s)	Jolien D'Hoore	Belgium	
4	Laurie Berthon	France	
5	Franziska Brauße	Germany	
6	Olivija Baleišytė	Lithuania	
7	Amber Joseph	Barbados	
8	Alžbeta Bačíková	Slovakia	
9	Jarmila Machačová	Czech Republic	
10	Anita Stenberg	Norway	
11	Irene Usabiaga	Spain	
12	Lydia Gurley	Ireland	
13	Evgenia Augustinas	Russia	
—	Amalie Dideriksen	Denmark	did not finish
—	Huang Ting-ying	Chinese Taipei	did not finish
—	Jennifer Valente	United States	did not finish
—	Verena Eberhardt	Austria	did not finish
—	Hanna Tserakh	Belarus	did not finish
—	Shen Shanrong	China	did not finish
—	Martina Fidanza	Italy	did not finish
—	Racquel Sheath	New Zealand	did not finish
—	Justyna Kaczkowska	Poland	did not finish
—	Aline Seitz	Switzerland	did not finish
