= UCI Track Cycling World Championships – Women's madison =

The UCI Track Cycling World Championships – Women's madison is the world championship madison event held annually at the UCI Track Cycling World Championships. Although a storied and iconic event in male track cycling, it was first held for women only at the 2017 championships in Hong Kong, having been added to the Olympic programme for 2020.

Kirsten Wild and Amy Pieters have won the event three times, the only riders to have done so.

== Medalists ==
Year	Gold	Silver	Bronze
2017 Hong Kong	Belgium; Lotte Kopecky; Jolien D'Hoore	Great Britain; Elinor Barker; Emily Nelson	Australia; Amy Cure; Alexandra Manly
2018 Apeldoorn	Great Britain; Katie Archibald; Emily Nelson	Netherlands; Kirsten Wild; Amy Pieters	Italy; Letizia Paternoster; Maria Giulia Confalonieri
2019 Pruszków	Netherlands; Kirsten Wild; Amy Pieters	Australia; Georgia Baker; Amy Cure	Denmark; Amalie Dideriksen; Julie Leth
2020 Berlin	Netherlands; Kirsten Wild; Amy Pieters	France; Clara Copponi; Marie Le Net	Italy; Letizia Paternoster; Elisa Balsamo
2021 Roubaix	Netherlands; Amy Pieters; Kirsten Wild	France; Clara Copponi; Marie Le Net	Great Britain; Katie Archibald; Neah Evans
2022 Saint-Quentin-en-Yvelines	Belgium; Shari Bossuyt; Lotte Kopecky	France; Clara Copponi; Valentine Fortin	Denmark; Amalie Dideriksen; Julie Leth
2023 Glasgow	Great Britain; Neah Evans; Elinor Barker	Australia; Georgia Baker; Alexandra Manly	France; Victoire Berteau; Clara Copponi
2024 Ballerup	Denmark; Amalie Dideriksen; Julie Norman Leth	France; Victoire Berteau; Marion Borras	Great Britain; Neah Evans; Katie Archibald
2025 Santiago	Great Britain; Madelaine Leech; Katie Archibald	France; Victoire Berteau; Marion Borras	Italy; Vittoria Guazzini; Chiara Consonni
2026 Shanghai	Great Britain; Erin Boothman; Anna Morris	France; Marion Borras; Clara Copponi	Japan; Maho Kakita; Tsuyaka Uchino

== Medal table ==
Rank	Nation	Gold	Silver	Bronze	Total
1	Great Britain	4	1	2	7
2	Netherlands	3	1	0	4
3	Belgium	2	0	0	2
4	Denmark	1	0	2	3
5	France	0	6	1	7
6	Australia	0	2	1	3
7	Italy	0	0	3	3
8	Japan	0	0	1	1
Totals (8 entries)		10	10	10	30
