= 2017 UCI Track Cycling World Championships – Women's madison =

Women's madison at the 2017 UCI Track Cycling World Championships
- Venue: Hong Kong Velodrome
- Location: Hong Kong
- Dates: 15 April
- Competitors: 30 from 15 nations
- Teams: 15
- Winning points: 44

Medalists
gold medal	Lotte Kopecky; Jolien D'Hoore	Belgium
silver medal	Elinor Barker; Emily Nelson	Great Britain
bronze medal	Amy Cure; Alexandra Manly	Australia

The Women's Madison competition at the 2017 UCI Track Cycling World Championships was held on 15 April 2017.

== Results ==
120 laps (30 km) with 12 sprints were raced.

Rank	Name	Nation	Points	Laps down
1st place, gold medalist(s)	Lotte Kopecky; Jolien D'Hoore	Belgium	44	
2nd place, silver medalist(s)	Elinor Barker; Emily Nelson	Great Britain	34	
3rd place, bronze medalist(s)	Amy Cure; Alexandra Manly	Australia	25	
4	Maria Giulia Confalonieri; Rachele Barbieri	Italy	15	
5	Racquel Sheath; Michaela Drummond	New Zealand	14	
6	Coralie Demay; Laurie Berthon	France	5	
7	Lizbeth Yareli Salazar Vázquez; Sofía Arreola Navarro	Mexico	5	
8	Kimberly Zubris; Kimberly Geist	United States	1	
9	Mariia Averina; Diana Klimova	Russia	0	
10	Lydia Gurley; Lydia Boylan	Ireland	0	
11	Meng Zhaojuan; Pang Yao	Hong Kong	−20	−1
—	Anna Nahirna; Oksana Kliachina	Ukraine	DNF	
—	Jarmila Machačová; Lucie Hochmann	Czech Republic	DNF	
—	Katsiaryna Piatrouskaya; Polina Pivovarova	Belarus	DNF	
—	Daria Pikulik; Nikol Płosaj	Poland	DNF	
—	Laura Brown; Stephanie Roorda	Canada	DNS	
