= 2023 UEC European Track Championships – Women's madison =

Women's madison at the 2023 UEC European Track Championships
- Venue: Tissot Velodrome, Grenchen
- Date: 12 February
- Competitors: 26 from 13 nations
- Teams: 13
- Winning points: 38

Medalists
gold medal	Katie Archibald; Elinor Barker	Great Britain
silver medal	Victoire Berteau; Clara Copponi	France
bronze medal	Elisa Balsamo; Vittoria Guazzini	Italy

The women's madison competition at the 2023 UEC European Track Championships was held on 12 February 2023.

== Results ==
120 laps (30 km) with 12 sprints were raced.

Rank	Name	Nation	Lap points	Sprint points	Finish order	Total points
1st place, gold medalist(s)	Katie Archibald; Elinor Barker	Great Britain	0	38	1	38
2nd place, silver medalist(s)	Victoire Berteau; Clara Copponi	France	0	25	4	25
3rd place, bronze medalist(s)	Elisa Balsamo; Vittoria Guazzini	Italy	0	19	6	19
4	Shari Bossuyt; Lotte Kopecky	Belgium	0	17	3	17
5	Amalie Dideriksen; Julie Leth	Denmark	0	14	7	14
6	Daria Pikulik; Wiktoria Pikulik	Poland	0	10	5	10
7	Franziska Brauße; Lena Reißner	Germany	0	9	2	9
8	Marit Raaijmakers; Maike van der Duin	Netherlands	0	7	12	7
9	Michelle Andres; Aline Seitz	Switzerland	–20	1	8	–19
10	Eukene Larrarte; Laura Rodríguez	Spain	–20	0	9	–20
11	Kateřina Kohoutková; Petra Ševčíková	Czech Republic	–40	1	10	–39
12	Lara Gillespie; Alice Sharpe	Ireland	–60	2	11	–58
13	Verena Eberhardt; Kathrin Schweinberger	Austria	–40	0	–	DNF
