= 2016 UEC European Track Championships – Women's madison =

Women's madison at the 2016 UEC European Track Championships
- UEC European Champion jersey
- Venue: Vélodrome de Saint-Quentin-en-Yvelines, Yvelines
- Date: 23 October
- Competitors: 22 from 11 nations
- Winning points: 36

Medalists
gold medal	Jolien D'Hoore; Lotte Kopecky	Belgium
silver medal	Emily Kay; Emily Nelson	Great Britain
bronze medal	Nina Kessler; Kirsten Wild	Netherlands

The Women's madison was held on 23 October 2016. 11 teams participated over a distance of 30 km (120 laps), with sprints every 10 laps awarding 5, 3, 2 or 1 point to the first four (double in the final sprint); 20 points are also awarded/withdrawn for each lap gained/lost respectively.

== Results ==
Rank	Name	Nation	Sprint points	Lap points	Finish order	Total points
1st place, gold medalist(s)	Jolien D'Hoore; Lotte Kopecky	Belgium	36	0	2	36
2nd place, silver medalist(s)	Emily Kay; Emily Nelson	Great Britain	26	0	1	26
3rd place, bronze medalist(s)	Nina Kessler; Kirsten Wild	Netherlands	22	0	3	22
4	Coralie Demay; Laurie Berthon	France	17	0	7	17
5	Alexandra Chekina; Anastasiia Iakovenko	Russia	12	0	9	12
6	Rachele Barbieri; Maria Giulia Confalonieri	Italy	12	0	11	12
7	Lydia Boylan; Lydia Gurley	Ireland	7	0	4	7
8	Oksana Kliachina; Anna Nahirna	Ukraine	5	0	6	5
9	Lucie Hochmann; Jarmila Machačová	Czech Republic	4	0	10	4
10	Palina Pivavarava; Ina Savenka	Belarus	1	0	5	1
11	Daria Pikulik; Nikol Płosaj	Poland	1	0	8	1
