= 2020 UCI Track Cycling World Championships – Women's points race =

Women's points race at the 2020 UCI Track Cycling World Championships
- Venue: Velodrom
- Location: Berlin, Germany
- Dates: 1 March
- Competitors: 24 from 24 nations
- Winning points: 50

Medalists
gold medal	Elinor Barker	Great Britain
silver medal	Jennifer Valente	United States
bronze medal	Anita Stenberg	Norway

The Women's points race competition at the 2020 UCI Track Cycling World Championships was held on 1 March 2020.

== Results ==
The race was started at 14:02. 100 (25 km) laps were raced with 10 sprints.

Rank	Name	Nation	Lap points	Sprint points	Total points
1st place, gold medalist(s)	Elinor Barker	Great Britain	40	10	50
2nd place, silver medalist(s)	Jennifer Valente	United States	20	14	34
3rd place, bronze medalist(s)	Anita Stenberg	Norway	20	13	33
4	Olga Zabelinskaya	Uzbekistan	20	11	31
5	Maria Giulia Confalonieri	Italy	20	10	30
6	Kirsten Wild	Netherlands	20	9	29
7	Maria Novolodskaya	Russia	20	5	25
8	Trine Schmidt	Denmark	20	2	22
9	Tatsiana Sharakova	Belarus	0	12	12
10	Lotte Kopecky	Belgium	0	8	8
11	Hanna Solovey	Ukraine	0	7	7
12	Victoire Berteau	France	0	5	5
13	Amber Joseph	Barbados	0	5	5
14	Jarmila Machačová	Czech Republic	0	4	4
15	Alexandra Manly	Australia	0	3	3
16	Maria Martins	Portugal	0	2	2
17	Yang Qianyu	Hong Kong	0	0	0
18	Léna Mettraux	Switzerland	0	0	0
19	Verena Eberhardt	Austria	0	0	0
20	Wiktoria Pikulik	Poland	0	0	0
21	Alice Sharpe	Ireland	0	0	0
22	Irene Usabiaga	Spain	0	0	0
23	Sofía Arreola	Mexico	−20	1	−19
24	Tereza Medveďová	Slovakia	−40	0	−40
