= 2017 UCI Track Cycling World Championships – Men's 1 km time trial =

Men's 1 km time trial at the 2017 UCI Track Cycling World Championships
- Venue: Hong Kong Velodrome
- Location: Hong Kong
- Dates: 16 April
- Competitors: 27 from 15 nations
- Winning time: 1:00.714

Medalists
gold medal	François Pervis	France
silver medal	Tomáš Bábek	Czech Republic
silver medal	Quentin Lafargue	France

The Men's 1 km time trial competition at the 2017 World Championships was held on 16 April 2017.

== Results ==
=== Qualifying ===
The top 8 riders qualified for the final.

Rank	Name	Nation	Time	Behind	Notes
1	François Pervis	France	1:00.482		Q
2	Krzysztof Maksel	Poland	1:00.611	+0.129	Q
3	Quentin Lafargue	France	1:00.714	+0.232	Q
4	Tomáš Bábek	Czech Republic	1:01.159	+0.677	Q
5	Alexandr Vasyukhno	Russia	1:01.171	+0.689	Q
6	Dylan Kennett	New Zealand	1:01.219	+0.737	Q
7	Maximilian Dornbach	Germany	1:01.253	+0.771	Q
8	Joachim Eilers	Germany	1:01.272	+0.790	Q
9	Nicholas Kergozou	New Zealand	1:01.303	+0.821	
10	Zac Williams	New Zealand	1:01.317	+0.835	
11	Joseph Truman	Great Britain	1:01.429	+0.947	
12	Nick Yallouris	Australia	1:01.590	+1.108	
13	Stefan Ritter	Canada	1:01.766	+1.284	
14	Aleksandr Dubchenko	Russia	1:01.897	+1.415	
15	Santiago Ramírez	Colombia	1:01.933	+1.451	
16	Theo Bos	Netherlands	1:02.024	+1.542	
17	Fabián Puerta	Colombia	1:02.056	+1.574	
18	Marc Jurczyk	Germany	1:02.118	+1.636	
19	David Sojka	Czech Republic	1:02.161	+1.679	
20	Benjamin Edelin	France	1:02.162	+1.680	
21	José Moreno Sánchez	Spain	1:02.519	+2.037	
22	Kamil Kuczyński	Poland	1:02.539	+2.057	
23	Diego Peña	Colombia	1:03.384	+2.902	
24	Alejandro Martínez	Spain	1:03.475	+2.993	
25	Roberto Serrano	Mexico	1:03.759	+3.277	
26	Leung Ka Yu	Hong Kong	1:04.993	+4.511	
27	Mika Simola	Finland	1:05.446	+4.964	

=== Final ===
The final was started at 14:49.

Rank	Name	Nation	Time	Behind
1st place, gold medalist(s)	François Pervis	France	1:00.714	
2nd place, silver medalist(s)	Tomáš Bábek	Czech Republic	1:01.048	+0.334
2nd place, silver medalist(s)	Quentin Lafargue	France	1:01.048	+0.334
4	Krzysztof Maksel	Poland	1:01.143	+0.429
5	Joachim Eilers	Germany	1:01.221	+0.507
6	Dylan Kennett	New Zealand	1:01.324	+0.610
7	Maximilian Dornbach	Germany	1:01.389	+0.675
8	Alexandr Vasyukhno	Russia	1:01.773	+1.059
