= Alexandr Vasyukhno =

Russian cyclist

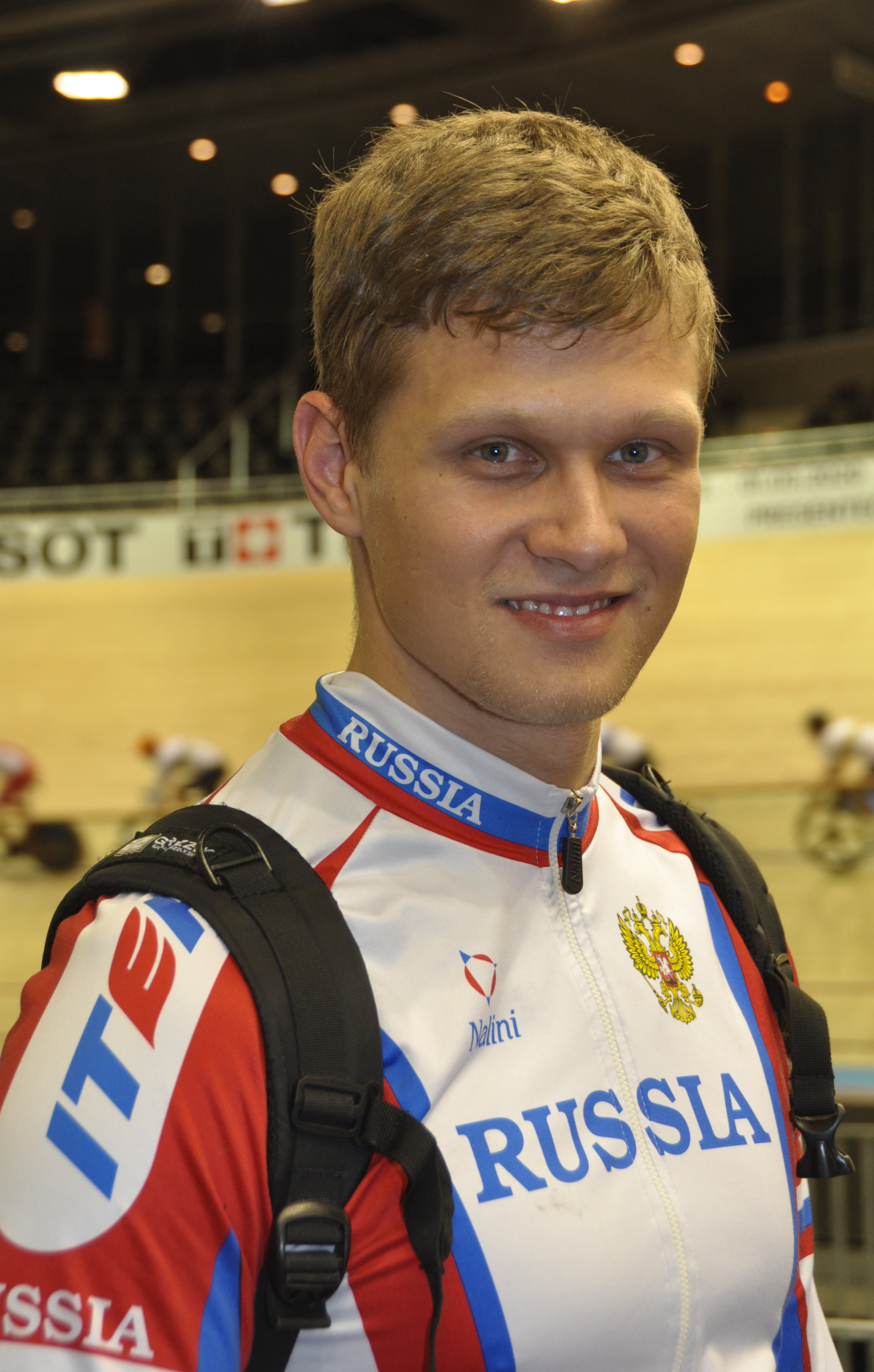
- Alexandr Vasyukhno (2018)

Personal information
- Born: 1 June 1997 (age 29)

Cycling career
- Sport: Cycling
- Role: Rider

Alexandr Vasyukhno (born 1 June 1997) is a Russian professional racing cyclist. He rode in the men's 1 km time trial event at the 2017 UCI Track Cycling World Championships.
