= 2015 Crescent Women World Cup Vårgårda =

2015 UCI Women's Road World Cup, race 9 of 10

Race details
- Dates: 23 August 2015
- Stages: 1
- Winning time: 3h 19' 23"

Results
	Winner	Jolien D'Hoore (BEL)	(Wiggle–Honda)
	Second	Giorgia Bronzini (ITA)	(Wiggle–Honda)
	Third	Lisa Brennauer (GER)	(Velocio–SRAM)

The 2015 Crescent Women World Cup Vårgårda featured as the ninth round of the 2015 UCI Women's Road World Cup. It was held on 23 August 2015, in Vårgårda, Sweden. Jolien D'Hoore (Wiggle–Honda) won, beating Giorgia Bronzini (Wiggle–Honda) and Lisa Brennauer (Velocio–SRAM).

== Results ==
Result
Rank	Rider	Team	Time
1	Jolien D'Hoore (BEL)	Wiggle–Honda	3h 19' 23"
2	Giorgia Bronzini (ITA)	Wiggle–Honda	+ 0"
3	Lisa Brennauer (GER)	Velocio–SRAM	+ 0"
4	Lucinda Brand (NED)	Rabo–Liv	+ 1"
5	Anna van der Breggen (NED)	Rabo–Liv	+ 1"
6	Amy Pieters (NED)	Team Liv–Plantur	+ 1"
7	Tiffany Cromwell (AUS)	Velocio–SRAM	+ 3"
8	Emma Johansson (SWE)	Orica–GreenEDGE	+ 3"
9	Shelley Olds (USA)	Bigla Pro Cycling Team	+ 6"
10	Lauren Kitchen (AUS)	Team Hitec Products	+ 6"
Source: ProCyclingStats

== World Cup Standings ==
Individual ranking after 9 of 10 World Cup races
Rank	Rider	Team	Points
1	Jolien D'Hoore (BEL)	Wiggle–Honda	391
2	Anna van der Breggen (NED)	Rabo–Liv	385
3	Lizzie Armitstead (GBR)	Boels–Dolmans	364
4	Elisa Longo Borghini (ITA)	Wiggle–Honda	320
5	Lucinda Brand (NED)	Rabo–Liv	297
6	Alena Amialiusik (BLR)	Velocio–SRAM	255
7	Giorgia Bronzini (ITA)	Wiggle–Honda	230
8	Annemiek van Vleuten (NED)	Bigla Pro Cycling Team	226
9	Elena Cecchini (ITA)	Lotto–Soudal Ladies	182
10	Pauline Ferrand-Prévot (FRA)	Rabo–Liv	175
Source: Union Cycliste Internationale
