= 2020 UEC European Track Championships – Women's elimination race =

Women's elimination race at the 2020 UEC European Track Championships
- Venue: Kolodruma, Plovdiv
- Date: 12 November
- Competitors: 14 from 14 nations

Medalists
gold medal	Elinor Barker	Great Britain
silver medal	Rachele Barbieri	Italy
bronze medal	Maria Martins	Portugal

The women's elimination race competition at the 2020 UEC European Track Championships was held on 12 November 2020.

== Results ==
Rank	Name	Nation
1st place, gold medalist(s)	Elinor Barker	Great Britain
2nd place, silver medalist(s)	Rachele Barbieri	Italy
3rd place, bronze medalist(s)	Maria Martins	Portugal
4	Diana Klimova	Russia
5	Ina Savenka	Belarus
6	Michelle Andres	Switzerland
7	Laura Rodríguez	Spain
8	Nikol Płosaj	Poland
9	Alžbeta Bačíková	Slovakia
10	Argiro Milaki	Greece
11	Tetyana Klimchenko	Ukraine
12	Olivija Baleišytė	Lithuania
13	Jarmila Machačová	Czech Republic
14	Johanna Kitti Borissza	Hungary
