= Ane Iriarte =

Spanish cyclist

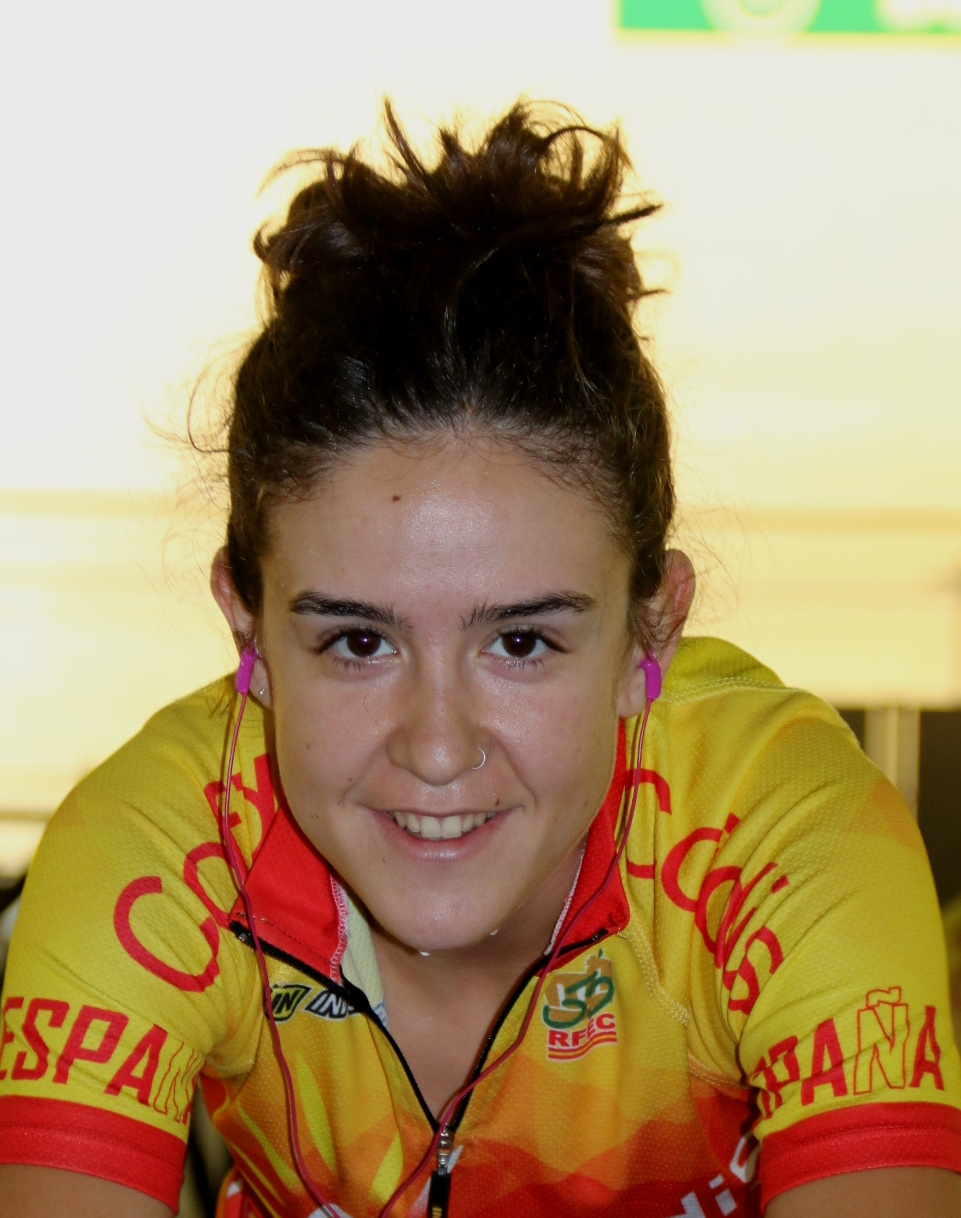
- Iriarte in 2017

Personal information
- Full name: Ane Iriarte Lasa
- Born: 4 April 1995 (age 31) Villabona, Spain

Cycling career
- Sport: Cycling
- Disciplines: Road; Track
- Role: Rider

Professional team
- 2018: Bizkaia Durango–Euskadi Murias

Ane Iriarte Lasa (born 4 April 1995) is a Spanish racing cyclist, who last rode for UCI Women's Team Bizkaia Durango–Euskadi Murias. She rode in the women's scratch event at the 2018 UCI Track Cycling World Championships.
