= 2017 UCI Track Cycling World Championships =

Cycling world championships

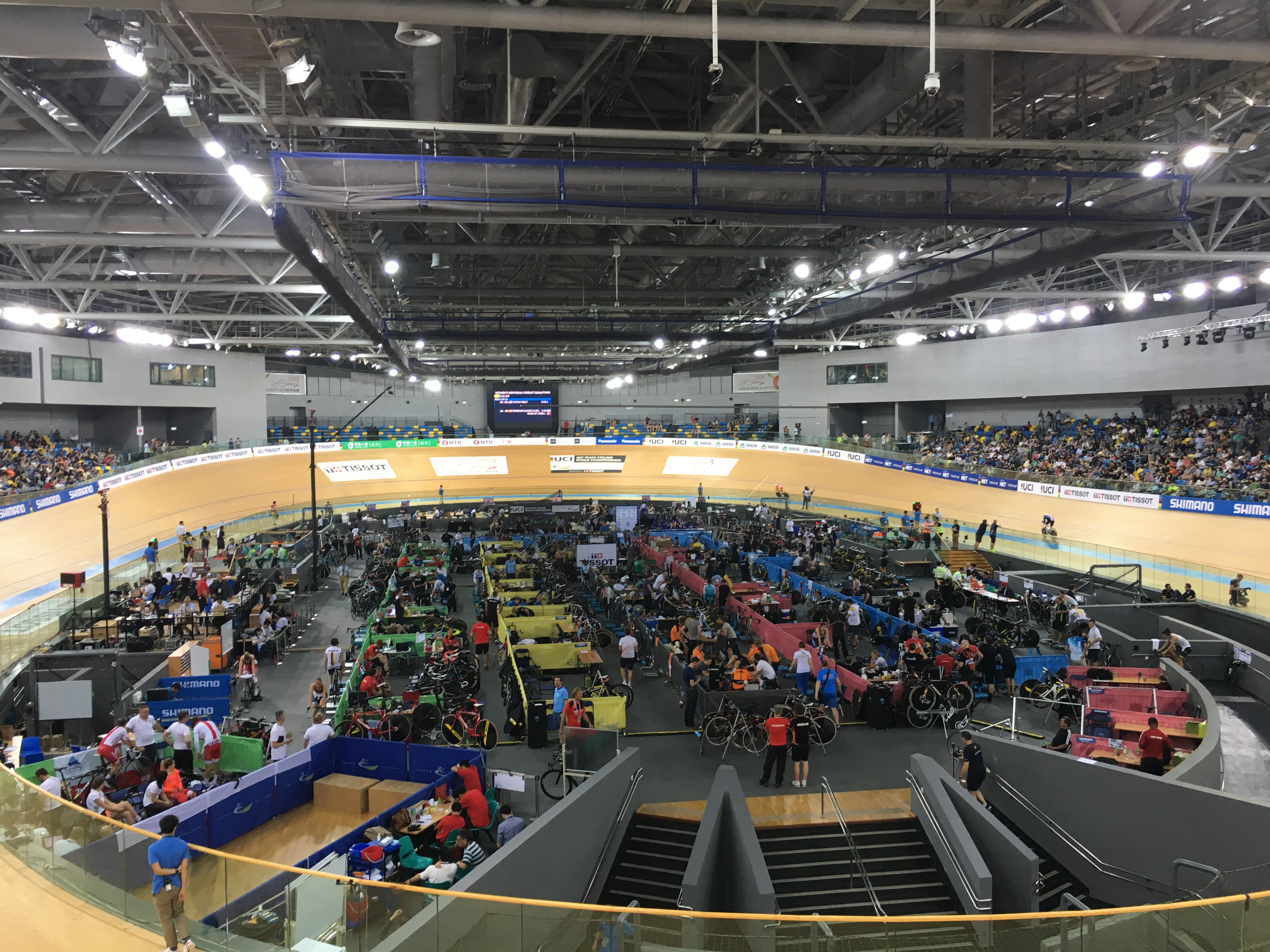
- Venue: Hong Kong
- Date: 12–16 April
- Velodrome: Hong Kong Velodrome
- Nations participating: 41
- Events: 20

The 2017 UCI Track Cycling World Championships were the World Championships for track cycling in 2017. They took place in Hong Kong in the Hong Kong Velodrome from 12 to 16 April 2017. The last time the championships took place in Asia was at the 1990 UCI Track Cycling World Championships in Japan at the Green Dome Maebashi.

== Bidding ==
Turkmenistan showed their interest in hosting the championships at the Opening Ceremony of the Olympic Council of Asia General Assembly in September 2015. The Central Asian country's President Gurbanguly Berdimuhamedov expressed his intention in which he reiterated his aim to use sport to raise the profile of the nation. Berdimuhamedov described the proposal as "fully in accord" with the plans of the nation, adding that the country has "all the necessary conditions". Igor Makarov, the Ashgabat-born president of the Russian Cycling Federation, outlined the attractions of the Ashgabat Sports Complex Velodrome. The velodrome is among the largest velodromes in the world with room for 6000 spectators. He appealed directly to the president to consider bidding for the event. The championships would represent the largest-profile sporting event ever held in Turkmenistan.

=== Announcement ===
UCI president Brian Cookson announced that Hong Kong would host the championships at the 2016 UCI Track Cycling World Championships. He praised Hong Kong for their organisation of the final round of 2015–2016 UCI Track Cycling World Cup, which took place at the end of January 2016.

== Schedule ==
The schedule of events was as follows:

Competition	F	Final

Men
Date →	Wed 12		Thu 13		Fri 14		Sat 15		Sun 16	
Event ↓	A	E	A	E	A	E	A	E	A	E
1 km Time Trial									Q	F
Pursuit					Q	F				
Keirin			R1, R	R2, F						
Omnium							SR, TR	ER, PR		
Points Race						F				
Scratch Race				F						
Sprint					Q, ^{1}/_{16}, ^{1}/_{8}		QF	SF, F		
Team Pursuit	Q	R1		F						
Team Sprint		Q, R1, F								
Madison										F

Women
Date →	Wed 12		Thu 13		Fri 14		Sat 15		Sun 16	
Event ↓	A	E	A	E	A	E	A	E	A	E
500 m Time Trial							Q	F		
Pursuit							Q	F		
Keirin									R1, R	R2, F
Omnium					SR, TR	ER, PR				
Points Race										F
Scratch Race		F								
Sprint			Q, ^{1}/_{16}, ^{1}/_{8}	QF		SF, F				
Team Pursuit	Q			R1, F						
Team Sprint		Q, R1, F								
Madison								F		

A = Afternoon session, E = Evening session
Q = qualifiers, R1 = first round, R2 = second round, R = repechages ^{1}/_{16} = sixteenth finals, ^{1}/_{8} = eighth finals, QF = quarterfinals, SF = semifinals
SR = Scratch Race, TR = Tempo Race, ER = Elimination Race, PR = Points Race

== Medal summary ==
=== Medal table ===
Rank	Nation	Gold	Silver	Bronze	Total
1	Australia (AUS)	3	5	3	11
2	France (FRA)	3	1	1	5
3	Russia (RUS)	3	0	1	4
4	Germany (GER)	2	2	1	5
4	Great Britain (GBR)	2	2	1	5
6	United States (USA)	2	1	1	4
7	New Zealand (NZL)	1	2	2	5
8	Belgium (BEL)	1	1	3	5
9	Italy (ITA)	1	1	1	3
10	Poland (POL)	1	0	1	2
11	Malaysia (MAS)	1	0	0	1
12	Netherlands (NED)	0	3	1	4
13	Colombia (COL)	0	2	0	2
14	Czech Republic (CZE)	0	1	1	2
15	Hong Kong (HKG)	0	0	1	1
15	Spain (ESP)	0	0	1	1
Totals (16 entries)		20	21	19	60

=== Medalists ===
Event	Gold	Silver	Bronze
Men's events
Sprint	Denis Dmitriev; Russia	Harrie Lavreysen; Netherlands	Ethan Mitchell; New Zealand
1 km Time Trial^{[N]}	François Pervis; France	Tomáš Bábek; Czech Republic; Quentin Lafargue; France	None awarded
Pursuit^{[N]}	Jordan Kerby; Australia	Filippo Ganna; Italy	Kelland O'Brien; Australia
Team Pursuit	Australia; Sam Welsford; Cameron Meyer; Alexander Porter; Nick Yallouris; Kelland O'Brien; Rohan Wight	New Zealand; Regan Gough; Pieter Bulling; Dylan Kennett; Nicholas Kergozou	Italy; Simone Consonni; Liam Bertazzo; Filippo Ganna; Francesco Lamon; Michele Scartezzini
Team Sprint	New Zealand; Ethan Mitchell; Sam Webster; Eddie Dawkins	Netherlands; Jeffrey Hoogland; Harrie Lavreysen; Matthijs Büchli; Theo Bos; Nils van 't Hoenderdaal	France; Benjamin Edelin; Sebastien Vigier; Quentin Lafargue; François Pervis
Keirin	Azizulhasni Awang; Malaysia	Fabián Puerta; Colombia	Tomáš Bábek; Czech Republic
Scratch Race^{[O]}	Adrian Tekliński; Poland	Lucas Liss; Germany	Christopher Latham; Great Britain
Points Race^{[O]}	Cameron Meyer; Australia	Kenny De Ketele; Belgium	Wojciech Pszczolarski; Poland
Madison	France; Morgan Kneisky; Benjamin Thomas	Australia; Cameron Meyer; Callum Scotson	Belgium; Moreno De Pauw; Kenny De Ketele
Omnium	Benjamin Thomas; France	Aaron Gate; New Zealand	Albert Torres; Spain
Women's events
Sprint	Kristina Vogel; Germany	Stephanie Morton; Australia	Lee Wai Sze; Hong Kong
500 m Time Trial^{[N]}	Daria Shmeleva; Russia	Miriam Welte; Germany	Anastasia Voynova; Russia
Pursuit^{[N]}	Chloé Dygert; United States	Ashlee Ankudinoff; Australia	Kelly Catlin; United States
Team Pursuit	United States; Kelly Catlin; Chloé Dygert; Kimberly Geist; Jennifer Valente	Australia; Amy Cure; Ashlee Ankudinoff; Alexandra Manly; Rebecca Wiasak	New Zealand; Racquel Sheath; Rushlee Buchanan; Kirstie James; Jaime Nielsen; Michaela Drummond
Team Sprint	Russia; Daria Shmeleva; Anastasia Voynova	Australia; Kaarle McCulloch; Stephanie Morton	Germany; Miriam Welte; Kristina Vogel
Keirin	Kristina Vogel; Germany	Martha Bayona; Colombia	Nicky Degrendele; Belgium
Scratch Race^{[O]}	Rachele Barbieri; Italy	Elinor Barker; Great Britain	Jolien D'Hoore; Belgium
Points Race^{[O]}	Elinor Barker; Great Britain	Sarah Hammer; United States	Kirsten Wild; Netherlands
Madison	Belgium; Lotte Kopecky; Jolien D'Hoore	Great Britain; Elinor Barker; Emily Nelson	Australia; Amy Cure; Alexandra Manly
Omnium	Katie Archibald; Great Britain	Kirsten Wild; Netherlands	Amy Cure; Australia

== Notes ==
- Riders named in italics did not participate in the medal finals.
- ^{^{O}} Contested in the Olympics as an intra-omnium discipline only.
- ^{^{N}} Not contested in the Olympics.
