= Jolien D'Hoore =

Belgian racing cyclist (born 1990)

Jolien D'hoore
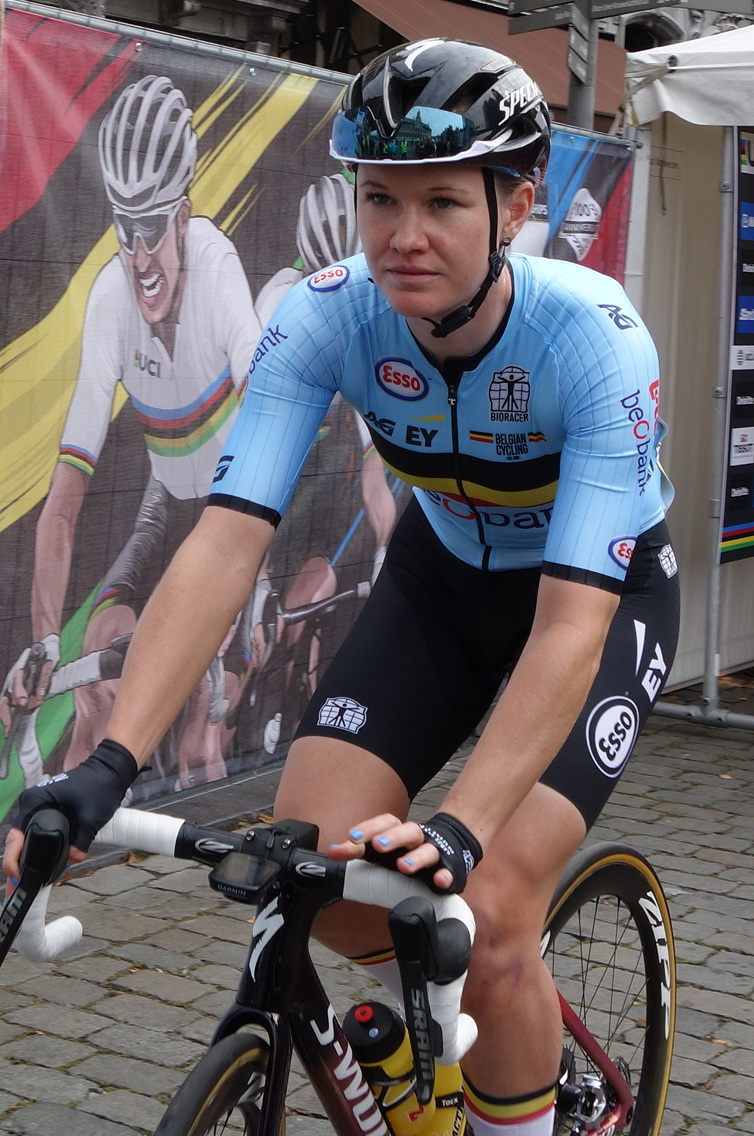
- D'Hoore at the 2020 World Championships

Personal information
- Full name: Jolien D'hoore
- Born: 14 March 1990 (age 36) Ghent, Belgium
- Height: 1.76 m (5 ft 9 in)
- Weight: 64 kg (141 lb)

Cycling career
- Sport: Cycling
- Current team: AG Insurance–Soudal
- Disciplines: Road; Track
- Role: Rider (retired); Directeur sportif
- Rider type: Sprinter (road); Endurance (track)

Professional teams
- 2007–2012: Vlaanderen–Capri Sonne–T Interim
- 2013–2014: Lotto–Belisol Ladies
- 2015–2017: Wiggle–Honda
- 2018: Mitchelton–Scott
- 2019–2021: Boels–Dolmans

Managerial team
- 2022–: NXTG by Experza

Major wins
- Major Tours Giro d'Italia 3 individual stages (2017, 2018) Stage races BeNe Ladies Tour (2015, 2016) Tour of Chongming Island (2017) One-day races and Classics National Road Race Championships (2012, 2014–2015, 2017) Ronde van Drenthe World Cup (2015) Crescent Women World Cup Vargarda (2015) Madrid Challenge by La Vuelta (2016, 2017) Diamond Tour (2014–2016) Omloop van het Hageland (2015) Track Championships National Track Championships 500m time trial (2006, 2007, 2008, 2009, 2010, 2015, 2016) Points (2015, 2019) Omnium (2007, 2010, 2014, 2015) Individual pursuit (2008, 2010, 2015, 2019) Team pursuit (2007, 2008, 2009, 2010) Scratch (2007, 2010, 2015, 2019) Individual Sprint (2007, 2008) Team Sprint (2008, 2009, 2010) European Championships Madison (2016) World Championships Madison (2017)
Medal record
Women's track cycling
Representing Belgium
Olympic Games
Bronze medal – third place	2016 Rio de Janeiro	Omnium
World Championships
Gold medal – first place	2017 Hong Kong	Madison
Silver medal – second place	2018 Apeldoorn	Scratch
Bronze medal – third place	2017 Hong Kong	Scratch
Bronze medal – third place	2019 Pruszków	Scratch
European Championships
Gold medal – first place	2016 Yvelines	Madison
Silver medal – second place	2014 Guadeloupe	Omnium
Silver medal – second place	2016 Yvelines	Points race
Bronze medal – third place	2013 Apeldoorn	Omnium
Bronze medal – third place	2018 Glasgow	Scratch

Jolien D'hoore (born 14 March 1990) is a Belgian former track and road cyclist, who rode professionally between 2007 and 2021 for the Topsport Vlaanderen–Ridley, Lotto–Belisol Ladies, Wiggle High5, Mitchelton–Scott, and SD Worx teams. D'hoore is a 29-time national track champion as well as a four-time national road champion at all competition levels. She won the bronze medal in the omnium at the 2016 Olympics and during her career was one of the strongest sprinters in the women's peloton. Since retiring as a rider, D'hoore now works as a directeur sportif for UCI Women's Continental Team AG Insurance–Soudal.

== Career ==
Most notably, she won the Belgian national road race championship in 2012. At the 2012 Summer Olympics, she was 5th in the Women's omnium. D'hoore signed with the Wiggle–Honda team for the 2015 season, winning 13 races in her first year with the team to become the most prolific winner in the women's peloton in 2015.

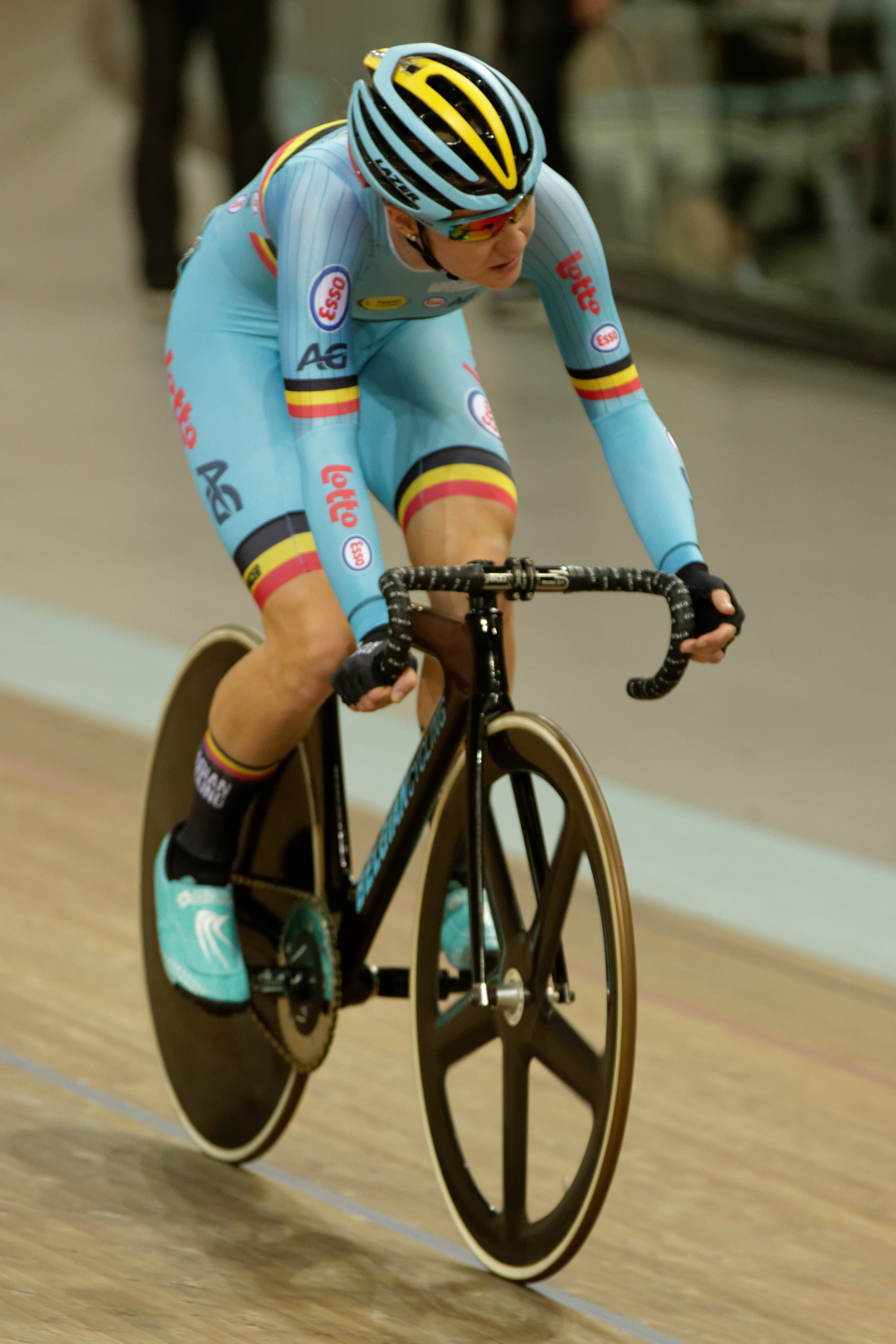
D'Hoore at the 2016 UEC European Track Championships

D'hoore won the bronze medal in the omnium at the 2016 Olympics. She won her first gold medal in her career in track cycling in the European championships. She won the madison with her partner, Lotte Kopecky. In 2017 they repeated this feat at the World Championships in Hong Kong. After three years at Wiggle High5, D'hoore signed with Mitchelton–Scott for 2018, and later joined Boels–Dolmans for 2019.

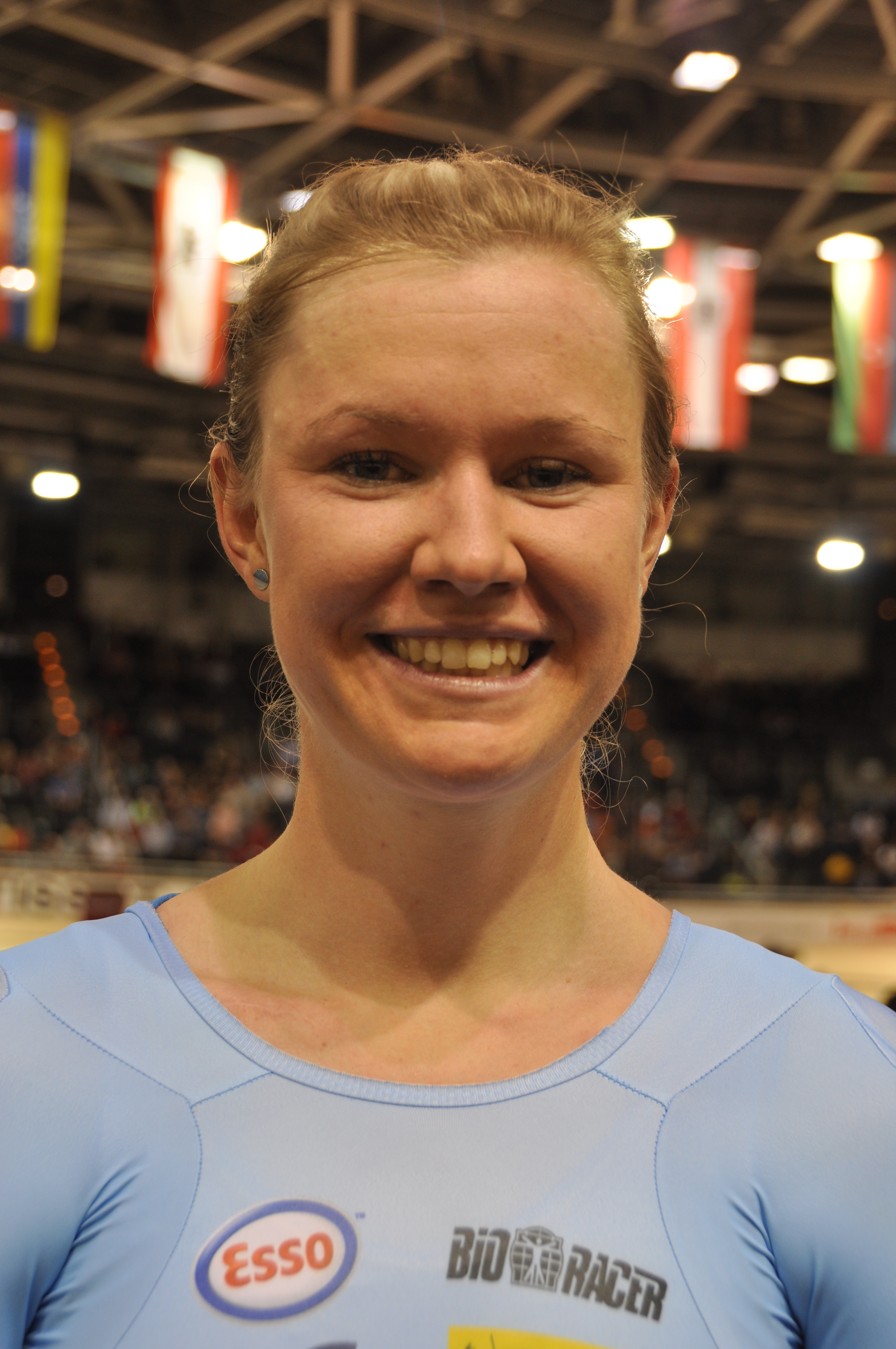
Jolien D'Hoore in 2018

In September 2021, it was announced that D'hoore's last race would be the inaugural women's Paris–Roubaix the following month, and that after her retirement from competition she would take up a directeur sportif position with NXTG by Experza from January 2022, combining the role with a position with Cycling Vlaanderen.

== Major results ==
=== Track ===
2005
2nd Omnium, National Junior Championships
2006
National Junior Championships

1st 500m time trial
1st Sprint
1st Scratch
2nd Points race
2nd Individual pursuit
2nd Omnium

2007
National Championships

1st 500m time trial
1st Sprint
1st Scratch
1st Team pursuit
1st Omnium
2nd Individual pursuit
2nd Keirin
2nd Points race

2008
National Championships

1st 500m time trial
1st Team pursuit
1st Individual pursuit
1st Team sprint
1st Sprint

UEC European Junior Championships

2nd Team pursuit
2nd Individual pursuit
2nd Points race
3rd Scratch

2009
National Championships

1st 500m time trial
1st Team pursuit
1st Team sprint

2nd Team pursuit, UEC European Under-23 Championships
2010
UEC European Under-23 Championships

1st Omnium
1st Team pursuit
3rd Points race

National Championships

1st 500m time trial
1st Scratch
1st Individual pursuit
1st Omnium
1st Team pursuit
1st Team sprint
2nd Points race

2012
UEC European Under-23 Championships

1st Points race
2nd Team pursuit

1st Omnium, National Championships
2013
Grand Prix of Poland

1st Points race
3rd Omnium
3rd Scratch

3 Jours d'Aigle

1st Individual pursuit
1st Scratch
3rd Points race

2nd Omnium, International Belgian Open
3rd Omnium, 2013–14 UCI Track Cycling World Cup, Aguascalientes
2014
Omnium, 2014–15 UCI Track Cycling World Cup

1st Guadalajara
2nd London

1st Omnium, National Championships
Cottbus Championships

1st 500m time trial
1st Omnium
1st Points race

1st Cottbuser Nächte Omnium
1st Sprintermeeting Omnium
1st International Belgian Open Omnium
2nd Omnium, UEC European Championships
2015
1st Omnium, National Championships
2015–16 UCI Track Cycling World Cup, Cambridge

2nd Scratch
3rd Omnium

2nd Omnium, Revolution – Derby
2nd Zesdaagse Vlaanderen-Gent
2016
1st Points race, 2015–16 UCI Track Cycling World Cup, Hong Kong
UEC European Championships

1st Madison
2nd Points race

: National Championships

1st 500m time trial
1st Scratch
1st Points race
1st Individual pursuit

3rd Omnium, Olympic Games
2017
UCI World Championships

1st Madison
3rd Scratch

2017–18 UCI Track Cycling World Cup

1st Madison, Pruszków
2nd Madison, Manchester
3rd Scratch, Manchester

Belgian International Track Meeting

1st Scratch
1st Madison

Zesdaagse Vlaanderen-Gent

1st Points race
2nd Madison

2018
2nd Scratch, UCI World Championships
3rd Scratch, UEC European Championships
Madison, 2018–19 UCI Track Cycling World Cup

3rd Berlin
3rd London

2019
: National Championships

1st Scratch
1st Points race

2018–19 UCI Track Cycling World Cup

1st Madison, Cambridge
2nd Madison, Hong Kong
3rd Scratch, Hong Kong

2019–20 UCI Track Cycling World Cup, Hong Kong

2nd Team pursuit
3rd Omnium

3rd Scratch, UCI World Championships
2020
2nd Madison, 2019–20 UCI Track Cycling World Cup, Milton

=== Road ===
2008
1st Road race, UCI Junior World Championships
4th Overall Omloop van Borsele

1st Points classification
1st Stage 1

National Junior Road Championships

1st Road race
3rd Time trial

7th Omloop van het Hageland |
9th Chrono des Nations Juniors
2009
1st Wodecq Criterium
2010
6th Time trial
9th Sparkassen Giro
2012
1st Road race, National Road Championships
3rd Breendonk
10th Le Samyn des Dames
10th Omloop van het Hageland
2013
1st Dwars door de Westhoek
1st Grand Prix of Poland
2nd Dwars door Vlaanderen
2nd Knokke-Heist – Bredene
3rd Cholet Pays de Loire Dames
4th Gent-Wevelgem
9th Ronde van Gelderland
2014
1st Road race, National Road Championships
1st Flanders Diamond Tour
1st Stage 5 Holland Ladies Tour
2nd Overall BeNe Ladies Tour

1st Points classification
1st Stages 1 & 2b

2nd Cholet Pays de Loire Dames
2nd Ronde van Gelderland
2nd Dwars door de Westhoek
2nd Overall Baloise Ladies Tour

1st Points classification
1st Stages 1 & 3

4th Novilon EDR Cup
4th Sparkassen Giro
7th Overall Ladies Tour of Qatar
7th La Course by Le Tour de France
7th Dwars door Vlaanderen
2015
National Road Championships

1st Road race
2nd Time trial

1st Overall BeNe Ladies Tour

1st Points classification
1st Stages 1, 2a (ITT) & 2b

1st Omloop van het Hageland
1st Ronde van Drenthe World Cup
1st Diamond Tour
1st Crescent Women World Cup Vårgårda
Holland Ladies Tour

1st Stages 1 & 2

1st Vårgårda WestSweden
1st Stage 2 Bloeizone Fryslân Tour
2nd Overall The Women's Tour

1st Stage 2

2nd Tour of Flanders
2nd Dwars door de Westhoek
2nd La Course by Le Tour de France
3rd Overall UCI Women's Road World Cup
4th Cholet Pays de Loire Dames
4th Gent–Wevelgem
4th Ronde van Gelderland
5th Le Samyn des Dames
6th Overall Ladies Tour of Qatar
8th Overall Energiewacht Tour
8th Sparkassen Giro

1st Stage 1

8th Sparkassen Giro
2016
1st Overall BeNe Ladies Tour

1st Points classification
1st Stages 1, 3 (ITT) & 4

1st Flanders Diamond Tour
1st Madrid Challenge by La Vuelta

1st Stages 1, 3 & 4

2nd Dwars door Vlaanderen
3rd Road race, National Road Championships
4th Keukens Van Lommel Classic
5th Pajot Hills Classic
6th Overall Tour de Feminin-O cenu Českého Švýcarska

1st Points classification
1st Stage 4

10th Road race, UCI Road World Championships
2017
1st Road race, National Road Championships
1st Overall Tour of Chongming Island

1st Mountains classification
1st Stages 2 & 3

1st Omloop van het Hageland
1st Grand Prix de Dottignies
1st Madrid Challenge by La Vuelta
1st Stage 1 Ladies Tour of Norway
1st Stage 4 Giro Rosa
1st Stage 5 The Women's Tour
2nd Gent–Wevelgem
4th Overall Belgium Tour

1st Belgian rider classification
1st Prologue & Stage 2

5th Gooik–Geraardsbergen–Gooik
6th Road race, UEC European Road Championships
6th Ronde van Drenthe
6th RideLondon Classique
7th Omloop Het Nieuwsblad
7th Dwars door de Westhoek
2018
1st Three Days of Bruges–De Panne
1st Stage 1 The Women's Tour
Giro Rosa

1st Stages 3 & 4

2nd Drentse Acht van Westerveld
2nd Gent–Wevelgem
3rd Omloop van het Hageland
4th Brabantse Pijl Dames Gooik
5th UCI World Championships TTT
5th Overall BeNe Ladies Tour
7th RideLondon Classique
8th Overall Tour of Chongming Island
8th Omloop Het Nieuwsblad
9th Road race National Road Championships
2019
The Women's Tour

1st Stages 1 & 3

1st Stage 1 Emakumeen Euskal Bira
2nd Time trial, National Road Championships
6th Overall Healthy Ageing Tour
7th Durango-Durango Emakumeen Saria
2020
1st Gent–Wevelgem
2nd Road race, National Road Championships
2021
1st Stage 1 Healthy Ageing Tour
2nd Dwars door de Westhoek
2nd GP Oetingen
3rd Classic Brugge–De Panne
5th Dwars door het Hageland
6th Overall Belgium Tour
6th Nokere Koerse
7th Diamond Tour
9th Omloop van de Westhoek

=== Honours and awards ===
- Flandrienne of the Year: 2014, 2015, 2016
- Vlaamse Reus nomination: 2016
- Crystal Bicycle: 2016, 2017
- Lifetime Achievement Award: 2021
- Grote Prijs Jolien D’Hoore, a race in Zottegem from 2022
