= Elinor Barker =

Welsh racing cyclist (born 1994)

Elinor Barker MBE
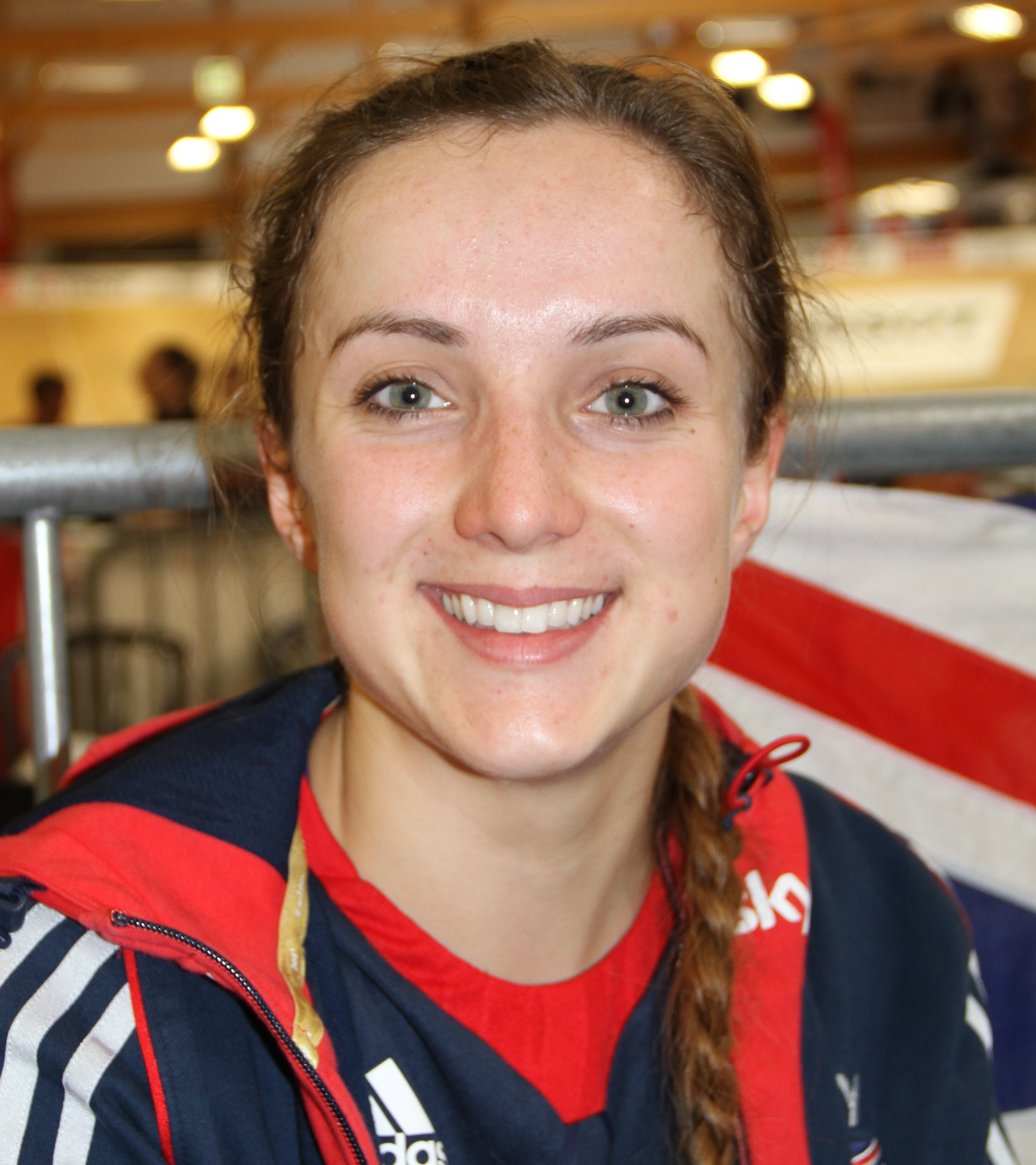
- Barker in 2015

Personal information
- Full name: Elinor Jane Barker
- Born: 7 September 1994 (age 32) Cardiff, Wales
- Height: 1.63 m (5 ft 4 in)
- Weight: 56 kg (123 lb)

Cycling career
- Sport: Cycling
- Current team: Uno-X Mobility
- Disciplines: Road; Track
- Role: Rider
- Rider type: Road: Time trialist; Track: Pursuitist

Amateur teams
- Maindy Flyers
- Cardiff Ajax
- Scott Contessa Epic RT

Professional teams
- 2012–2014: Team USN (track)
- 2013–2014: Wiggle–Honda (road)
- 2015: Matrix Fitness Pro Cycling
- 2018: Wiggle High5
- 2019: Drops
- 2020: Tekkerz (track)
- 2022–: Uno-X Pro Cycling Team
Medal record
Women's track cycling
Representing Great Britain
Olympic Games
Gold medal – first place	2016 Rio de Janeiro	Team pursuit
Silver medal – second place	2020 Tokyo	Team pursuit
Silver medal – second place	2024 Paris	Madison
Bronze medal – third place	2024 Paris	Team pursuit
World Championships
Gold medal – first place	2013 Minsk	Team pursuit
Gold medal – first place	2014 Cali	Team pursuit
Gold medal – first place	2017 Hong Kong	Points race
Gold medal – first place	2019 Pruszków	Scratch
Gold medal – first place	2020 Berlin	Points race
Gold medal – first place	2023 Glasgow	Madison
Gold medal – first place	2023 Glasgow	Team pursuit
Silver medal – second place	2015 Yvelines	Team pursuit
Silver medal – second place	2017 Hong Kong	Scratch
Silver medal – second place	2017 Hong Kong	Madison
Silver medal – second place	2018 Apeldoorn	Team pursuit
Silver medal – second place	2019 Pruszków	Team pursuit
Silver medal – second place	2020 Berlin	Team pursuit
Bronze medal – third place	2016 London	Team pursuit
European Championships
Gold medal – first place	2013 Apeldoorn	Team pursuit
Gold medal – first place	2014 Guadeloupe	Team pursuit
Gold medal – first place	2015 Grenchen	Team pursuit
Gold medal – first place	2017 Berlin	Madison
Gold medal – first place	2018 Glasgow	Team pursuit
Gold medal – first place	2019 Apeldoorn	Team pursuit
Gold medal – first place	2020 Plovdiv	Elimination
Gold medal – first place	2020 Plovdiv	Team pursuit
Gold medal – first place	2023 Grenchen	Madison
Gold medal – first place	2023 Grenchen	Team pursuit
Silver medal – second place	2016 Yvelines	Scratch
Silver medal – second place	2017 Berlin	Team pursuit
Bronze medal – third place	2020 Plovdiv	Madison
Junior World Championships
Silver medal – second place	2012 Invercargill	Individual pursuit
Silver medal – second place	2012 Invercargill	Omnium
Bronze medal – third place	2012 Invercargill	Team pursuit
U23 & Junior European Championships
Gold medal – first place	2012 Anadia	Junior Individual pursuit
Gold medal – first place	2012 Anadia	Junior Team pursuit
Silver medal – second place	2011 Anadia	Junior Individual pursuit
Silver medal – second place	2013 Anadia	U23 Individual pursuit
Silver medal – second place	2013 Anadia	U23 Points race
Representing Wales
Commonwealth Games
Gold medal – first place	2018 Gold Coast	Points race
Silver medal – second place	2014 Glasgow	Points race
Bronze medal – third place	2014 Glasgow	Scratch
Women's road cycling
Representing Great Britain
World Championships
Gold medal – first place	2012 Valkenburg	Junior Time trial
Silver medal – second place	2011 Copenhagen	Junior Time trial

Elinor Jane Barker (born 7 September 1994) is a Welsh road and track cyclist, who has ridden for UCI Women's Team Uno-X Mobility since 2022. As a track cyclist, she is an Olympic champion in the team pursuit and a world champion in the team pursuit, madison, points race, and scratch race disciplines. She has won four Olympic medals (one gold, two silver and one bronze) during her career. Her overall tally of four Olympic medals is a record for a Welsh woman.

In her youth, Barker was the 2012 junior time trial world champion in road cycling. On her debut for Great Britain in November 2012, she was part of the team pursuit side that won gold in the World Cup event in Glasgow. The following year, she triumphed in the team pursuit at both the Track Cycling World Championships and European Track Championships. She helped Great Britain defend their world team pursuit title in 2014, and won a silver and a bronze at that year's Commonwealth Games. Further World and European Championships medals followed in 2015, and Barker won an Olympic gold medal in the team pursuit at the 2016 Summer Olympics.

Barker won her first individual world title in the points race in 2017, won a gold medal in the same discipline at the 2018 Commonwealth Games, and became the scratch race world champion in 2019. She won her second points race world title and a European title in the elimination race in 2020, and a silver in the team pursuit at the delayed 2020 Summer Olympics. Following maternity leave, she won two gold medals at both the European and World Track Cycling Championships in 2023. At the 2024 Olympics, Barker won a bronze medal in the team pursuit and a silver in the madison.

Barker is an Olympic champion, a three-time world champion and seven-time European champion in the team pursuit, as well as a two-time world champion in the points race, a world champion in both the madison and scratch race, a two-time European madison champion, and one-time European elimination race champion. She is also a Commonwealth Games gold medalist in the points race. In her road cycling career, she finished seventh at the Gent-Wevelgem in 2023, and third at the British National Time Trial Championships in 2023 and 2024.

== Life and career ==
=== 1994–2012 ===
Elinor Jane Barker was born on 7 September 1994 in Cardiff. The older sister of racing cyclist Megan Barker, Elinor took up cycling with the Maindy Flyers aged ten to avoid swimming classes and later attended Llanishen High School.

In 2011, Barker became the British national junior pursuit champion, finished runner-up in the British national junior scratch race, and claimed silver in the time-trial at the UCI Junior Road World Championships in Copenhagen. At the 2012 UEC U23/Junior European Track Championship, she won gold medals in both the junior individual pursuit and the team pursuit. At the UCI Junior Track Cycling World Championships, she then won silver medals in the individual pursuit and omnium and a bronze in the team pursuit.

Competing in road cycling, she became the junior time trial world champion in 2012, completing the 15.6-kilometre (9.7-mile) course in Valkenburg, Netherlands in 22:26.29, beating Cecilie Uttrup Ludwig of Denmark by 35.87 seconds. That year, she joined the Olympic Development Programme.

Barker competed in the UCI Track Cycling World Cup in October 2012 in Cali, Colombia, where she won a silver medal in the team pursuit while competing for Team SWI Welsh Cycling. The following month, Barker made her debut for Great Britain at the Track Cycling World Cup in Glasgow as a replacement for an ill Joanna Rowsell. Barker, Laura Kenny and Dani King triumphed over Australia in the final. Barker was named Carwyn James Junior Sportswoman of the Year at the 2012 BBC Wales Sports Personality of the Year awards.

=== 2013–2016 ===
In February 2013, while studying for her A-levels, Barker became a senior-level world champion for the first time as a member of Great Britain's team pursuit squad at the UCI Track Cycling World Championships in Minsk, Belarus. Barker, Kenny and King rode to victory against Australia in the final.

Barker finished with two silver medals in the under-23 category in both the individual pursuit and the points race at the 2013 Junior/U23 European Track Championships in Portugal. Kenny beat her to gold in both disciplines. She moved to Manchester in September to enable her to train full-time with the British squad. She was then part of the British team that won the team pursuit gold in the 2013 UEC European Track Championships in Apeldoorn, Netherlands. Great Britain also set a new team pursuit world record time of 4:26.556.

In November, Great Britain twice broke the world record for the team pursuit at the Track Cycling World Cup in Manchester. Competing as a quartet following a recent-rule change, (Note: In 2013, the women's team pursuit was increased from three riders cycling 3000 m to four riders cycling 4000 m.) Barker, Kenny, King and Rowsell won the event by beating Canada in the final with a time of 4:19.604. After replacing Kenny with Katie Archibald, the team broke their own record twice more at the next leg of the Track Cycling World Cup series in Aguascalientes, Mexico, where they triumphed over Canada in the final. The team consisting of Barker, Rowsell, King and Katie Archibald beat their own record set in Manchester by 3.052 seconds.

At the 2014 UCI Track Cycling World Championships in Cali, Barker, Kenny, Rowsell and Archibald led Great Britain to victory in the team pursuit after defeating Canada in the gold-medal race. Barker represented Wales at the 2014 Commonwealth Games in Glasgow, where she secured silver in the points race and bronze in the scratch race. She won gold in the team pursuit at the 2014 UEC European Track Championships in Guadeloupe after Great Britain beat Russia by nearly seven seconds in the gold-medal race.

Later that year, Barker finished fourth at the British National Time Trial Championships, trailing first position by just over a minute. Barker finished her year by claiming back-to-back gold medals in the team pursuit at the Track Cycling World Cup, triumphing in the events held in Guadalajara, and London.

At the 2015 UCI Track Cycling World Championships, in Saint-Quentin-en-Yvelines, France, Barker, Kenny, Rowsell and Archibald won silver after suffering a defeat to Australia in the final of the team pursuit. Australia also broke Great Britain's world record time in the event. Barker was part of the British team that finished first in the team pursuit at the 2015 UEC European Track Championships in Grenchen, Switzerland. Great Britain beat Russia in the final.

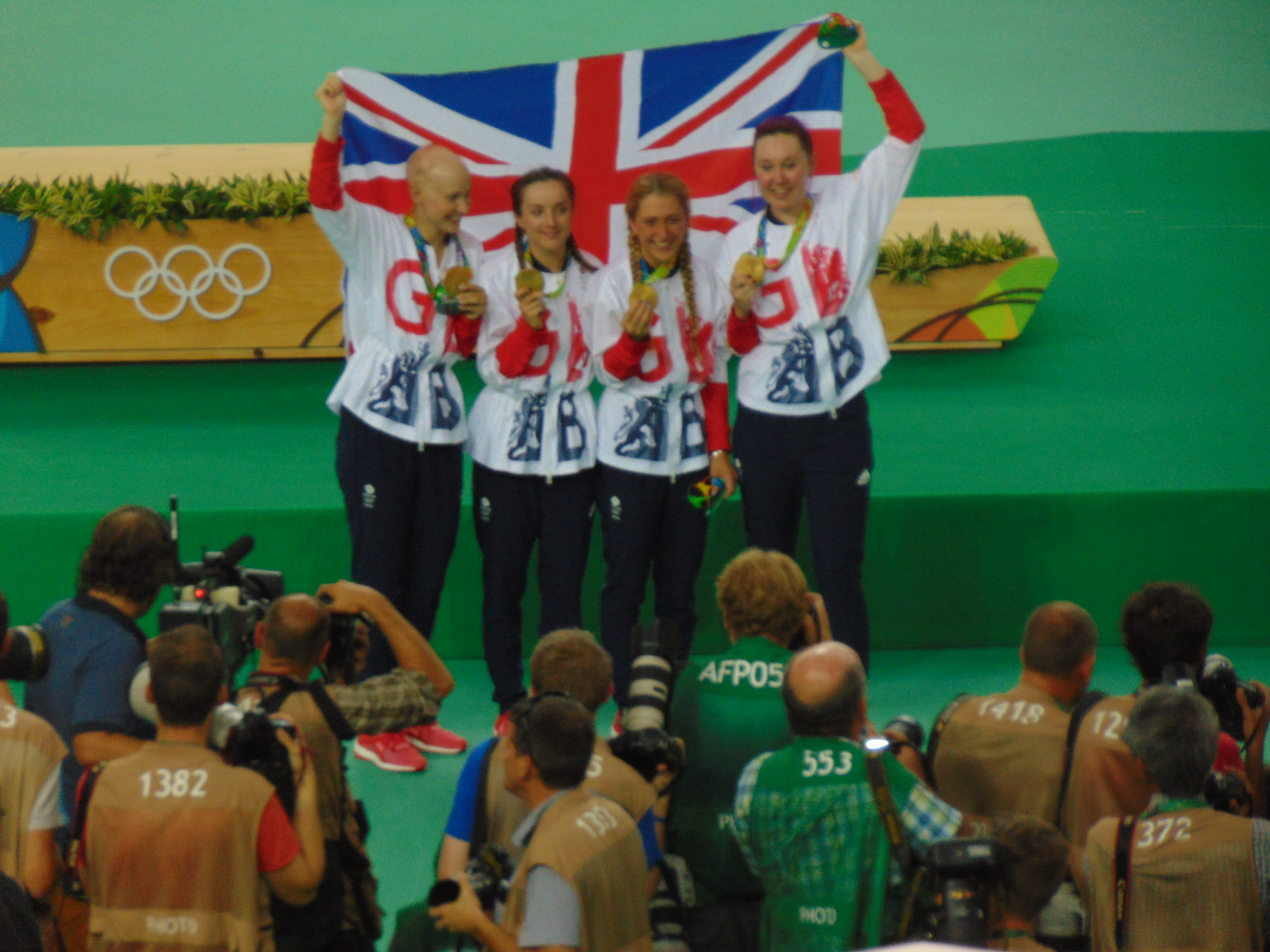
Great Britain celebrating gold in the team pursuit at the 2016 Summer Olympics (Barker is second from the left)

At the 2016 UCI Track Cycling World Championships in London, Barker was part of the team pursuit line-up along with Ciara Horne, Rowsell and Kenny. After finishing fifth in qualification, they fought back and eventually beat New Zealand to claim bronze. At the 2016 Summer Olympics in Rio de Janeiro, Barker along with Archibald, Rowsell and Kenny secured the gold medal in the team pursuit in a new world record time of 4:10.236 seconds, defeating the United States in the final. The quartet had broken the world record in qualifying, only to see the American team then better the record in their qualifying ride. The British team then broke it again in the final. After the Olympics, Barker said she would likely focus on individual events in 2017, such as the points race and the scratch race, rather than the team pursuit.

Returning to the track after the Olympics, Barker won a silver medal in the scratch race at the European Championships in Paris. She followed this by winning the points race at the Track Cycling World Cup in Apeldoorn. Barker then claimed the title at the Six Days of Amsterdam, which included a win in the elimination race on the final day. She closed 2016 with first place in the British National Madison Championships alongside Kenny.

=== 2017–2020 ===
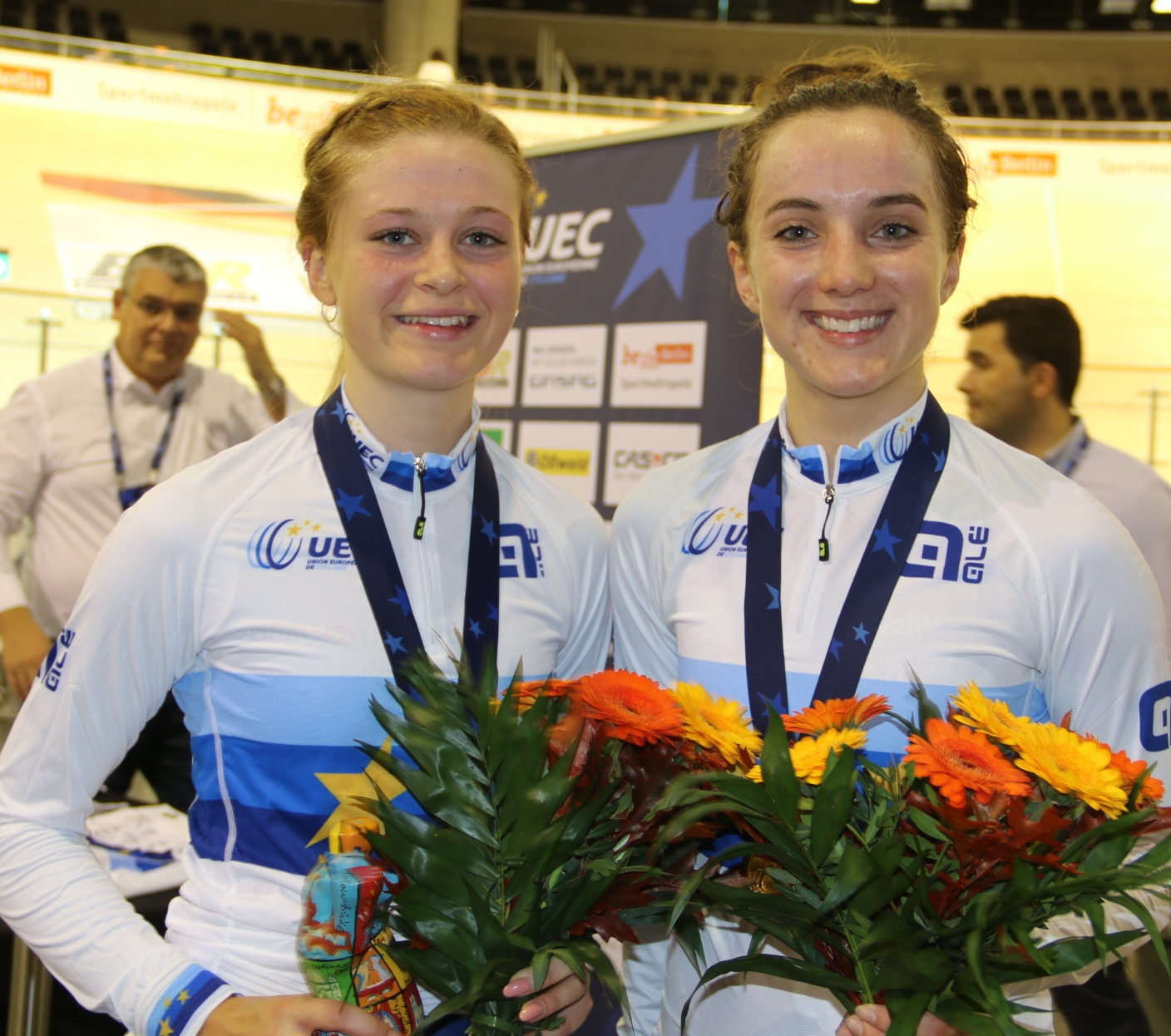
Barker (right) celebrating a gold medal in the madison at the 2017 European Track Championships with Ellie Dickinson

Barker was appointed Member of the Order of the British Empire (MBE) in the 2017 New Year Honours for services to cycling. She then finished third in the scratch race at the Track Cycling World Cup event in Los Angeles and fifth in the madison with Ellie Dickinson. In the Six Days series in Mallorca, Barker won the title after three top-four finishes during the competition. She claimed silver medals at the 2017 World Championships in Hong Kong in both the scratch race and the madison, the latter alongside Emily Nelson, and won her first individual world title in the points race. She finished the points race with fifty-nine points, eight ahead of second-placed American rider Sarah Hammer. At the 2017 UEC European Track Championships in Berlin, Barker won silver in the final of the team pursuit and gold in the madison with teammate Dickinson. In November, Barker won a silver medal in the madison with Emily Nelson at the first round of the Track Cycling World Cup in Pruszków, Poland. She then claimed gold in both the team pursuit, and the madison (partnering Archibald) at the next leg of the World Cup in Manchester.

For the 2018 road cycling season, Barker joined Wiggle High5. On the track, she won a silver medal in the team pursuit at the 2018 UCI Track Cycling World Championships in Apeldoorn. Great Britain were defeated by the United States team in the final. At the 2018 Commonwealth Games on the Gold Coast, Australia, Barker secured gold in the points race for Wales, ahead of Archibald and Neah Evans. Her win was the first Commonwealth Games title for a Welsh track cyclist since 1990. Later that year, she won gold medals in team pursuits at the European Track Championships in Glasgow, and at the Track Cycling World Cup event in Milton, Canada; she and Archibald won further golds at the latter's madison. Around this time, she almost quit professional cycling, and acknowledged the help that her psychologist had given her to help her refind her love for the sport. She was also diagnosed with endometriosis, for which she elected for surgery.

At the 2019 Track Cycling World Championships in Pruszków, Barker won the rainbow jersey in the scratch race, her first world title in that discipline. She also won a silver in the team pursuit after Great Britain were defeated by Australia in the final. Barker broke her collarbone in August during the RideLondon Classique and did not race competitively again until December's Track Cycling World Cup event in Glasgow, when she won both the gold in the team pursuit and a silver medal in the madison alongside Archibald.

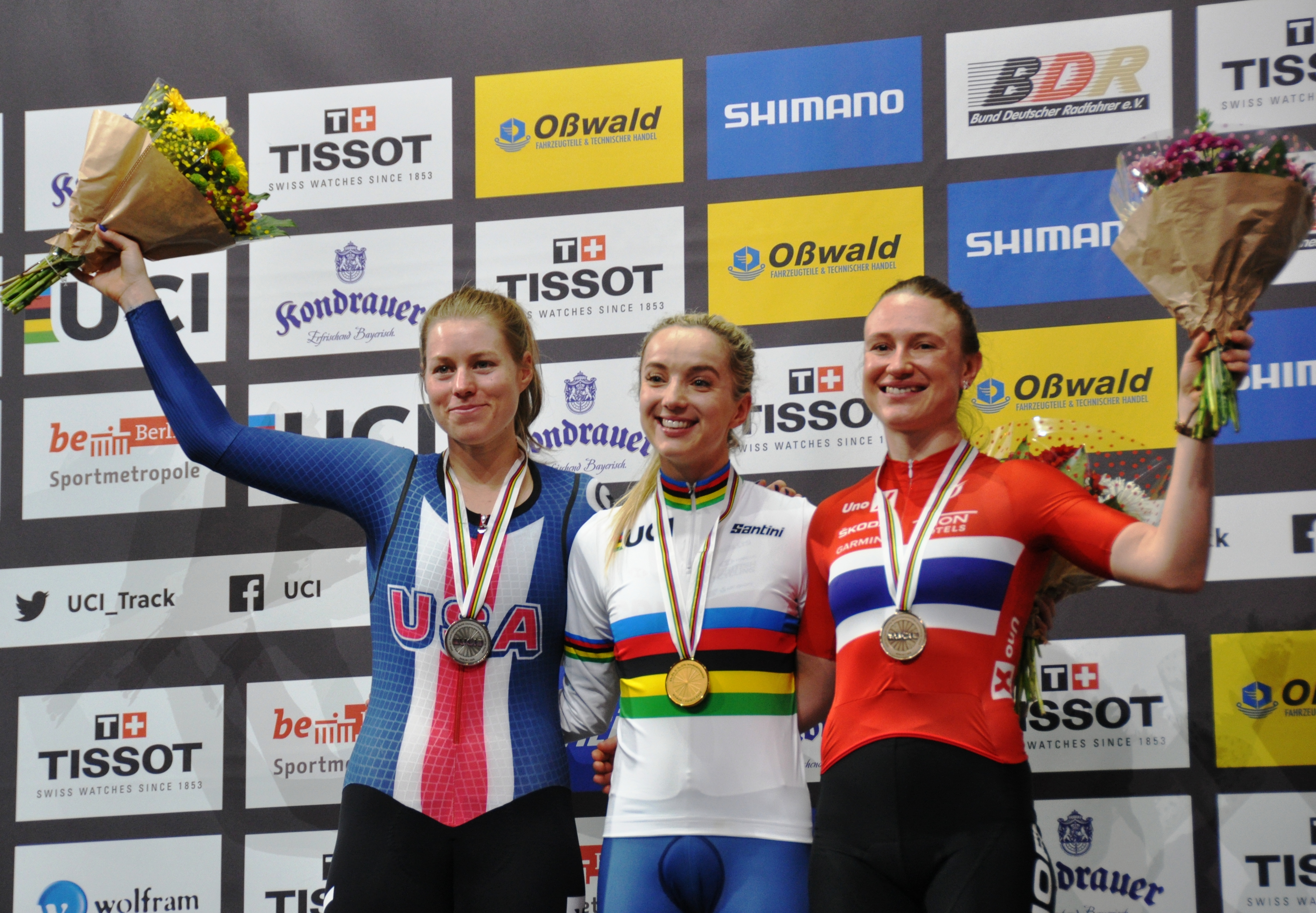
Elinor Barker (middle) after winning the points race at the 2020 World Championships

At the 2020 Track Cycling World Championships in Berlin, Germany, Barker won gold in the points race on the final day of the championships, taking Great Britain's only title of the meeting. It was her second triumph in the event after first winning the title in 2017. She was also part of the team that took silver in the team pursuit. Later that year, Barker won two titles at the European Track Championships, one as part of the team pursuit squad in which she competed during the qualifying round but sat out the final, and an individual gold in the elimination race. She concluded the competition with a bronze medal in the madison, partnering Kenny.

=== 2021–2026 ===
In 2021, Barker was part of the British squad that won silver in the team pursuit at the delayed (Note: The 2020 Summer Olympics were postponed in March 2020 in response to the COVID-19 pandemic.) 2020 Summer Olympics in Tokyo. At the time, Barker was pregnant by cyclist Casper von Folsach, whom she married in October 2024. She competed in the qualifying round but was then replaced by Evans in the line-up. Germany beat Great Britain's world record in the final which Barker did not take part in. During the Games she signed a two-year deal to join the Uno-X team from 2022. She was inspired to continue competing after becoming a mother by other professional cyclists that had done so including Lizzie Deignan, Kenny, and Sarah Storey.

Barker took maternity leave after giving birth in March 2022. She was selected by Wales for that year's Commonwealth Games in the road-race. The following year, Barker finished 15th at the Vuelta CV Feminas, before winning two gold medals at the 2023 UEC European Track Championships in Grenchen, her first major track cycling competition since becoming a mother. She triumphed as a member of the quartet that won the team pursuit and also in the madison partnering Archibald.

Barker finished seventh in the Gent–Wevelgem, her best ever finish in a UCI road race. She then finished 16th at the Fleche Wallone, before extending her contract with Uno-X until 2027. Barker also competed in the 2023 Giro Donne (Giro d'Italia Women) where she finished 58th, marking her first ever appearance at a grand tour, and she also finished third in the elite time-trial at the British National Championships. In August, at the 2023 UCI Track Cycling World Championships in Glasgow, Barker won a gold medal in the team pursuit alongside Archibald, Josie Knight and Anna Morris. It was the first time that Great Britain had won the event since 2014. She then won a second gold medal while partnering Evans in the madison.

At the 2024 UCI Track Cycling Nations Cup in Adelaide, Australia, Barker won a silver medal in the team pursuit, and then secured a gold medal in the madison with Archibald. Back on the road, she finished third in the elite time-trial at the British National Championships. At the 2024 Summer Olympics in Paris, Barker won bronze in the team pursuit alongside Knight, Morris and Jess Roberts. She then became the first Welsh woman to win four Olympic medals by securing a silver in the madison with Evans.

In June 2025, after finishing 16th at the British National Road Championships in Ceredigion, Barker ended her racing season early after announcing that she was expecting her second child. The following month, Barker was awarded an honorary degree by Swansea University for her "outstanding achievements and contribution to international cycling." On 2 January 2026, Barker posted on Instagram that she had recently given birth.

== Major results ==
=== Track ===
2011
National Junior Championships

1st Individual pursuit
2nd Scratch

2nd Individual pursuit, UEC European Junior Championships
2012
UEC European Junior Championships

1st Individual pursuit
1st Team pursuit

1st Team pursuit, National Championships
UCI World Cup

1st Team pursuit, Glasgow
2nd Team pursuit, Cali

UCI World Junior Championships

2nd Omnium
2nd Individual pursuit
3rd Team pursuit

2013
1st Team pursuit, UCI World Championships
1st Team pursuit, UEC European Championships
National Championships

1st Team pursuit
3rd Points race

UCI World Cup

1st Team pursuit, Manchester
1st Team pursuit, Aguascalientes

UEC European Under-23 Championships

2nd Individual pursuit
2nd Points race

2014
1st Team pursuit, UCI World Championships
1st Team pursuit, UEC European Championships
National Championships

1st Team pursuit
2nd Points race

UCI World Cup

1st Team pursuit, Guadalajara
1st Team pursuit, London
3rd Points race, London

Commonwealth Games

2nd Points race
3rd Scratch

2015
1st Team pursuit, UEC European Championships
2nd Team pursuit, UCI World Championships
3rd Team pursuit, UCI World Cup, Cali
2016
1st Team pursuit, Olympic Games
1st Madison, National Championships (with Laura Kenny)
1st Omnium, Six Days of Amsterdam
UCI World Cup

1st Points race, Apeldoorn
2nd Team pursuit, Hong Kong

2nd Scratch, UEC European Championships
3rd Team pursuit, UCI World Championships
2017
UCI World Championships

1st Points race
2nd Scratch
2nd Madison (with Emily Nelson)

UEC European Championships

1st Madison (with Ellie Dickinson)
2nd Team pursuit

UCI World Cup

1st Madison, Manchester
1st Team pursuit, Manchester
2nd Madison, Pruszków (with Emily Nelson)
3rd Scratch, Los Angeles

1st Omnium, Six Day Final, Mallorca
National Championships

2nd Omnium
3rd Scratch

2018
1st Points race, Commonwealth Games
1st Team pursuit, UEC European Championships
1st Madison, National Championships (with Katie Archibald)
UCI World Cup

1st Team pursuit, Milton
1st Madison, Milton (with Katie Archibald)

2nd Team pursuit, UCI World Championships
2019
UCI World Championships

1st Scratch
2nd Team pursuit

UCI World Cup

1st Team pursuit, Glasgow
2nd Madison, Glasgow (with Katie Archibald)

2nd Scratch, National Championships
2020
UCI World Championships

1st Points race
2nd Team pursuit

UEC European Championships

1st Elimination
1st Team pursuit
3rd Madison (with Laura Kenny)

2021
2nd Team pursuit, Olympic Games
2023
UCI World Championships

1st Team pursuit
1st Madison (with Neah Evans)

UEC European Championships

1st Team pursuit
1st Madison with (Katie Archibald)

2024
UCI Nations Cup

1st Madison, Adelaide (with Katie Archibald)
2nd Team pursuit, Adelaide

Olympic Games

2nd Madison (with Neah Evans)
3rd Team pursuit

=== Road ===
2011
1st Stratford-upon-Avon Team Series
1st Stage 1 Essex Giro
2nd Time trial, UCI World Junior Championships
2012
1st Time trial, UCI World Junior Championships
1st Jubilee Road Race
1st Duncan Murray Wines Road Race
2nd Hillingdon Grand Prix
2nd Overall 2 Days of Bedford

1st Stage 4

2013
1st Otley Grand Prix
2014
4th Time trial, National Championships
2017
1st Overall Rás na mBan

1st Queen of the Hills classification
1st Stages 3 & 4

3rd Ljubljana–Domžale–Ljubljana TT
National Championships

4th Road race
5th Time trial

7th Overall BeNe Ladies Tour

1st Stage 2a

2023
National Championships

3rd Time trial
4th Road race

7th Gent–Wevelgem
9th Time trial, UEC European Championships
2024
3rd Time trial, National Championships
