= Ana Usabiaga =

Spanish cyclist (born 1990)

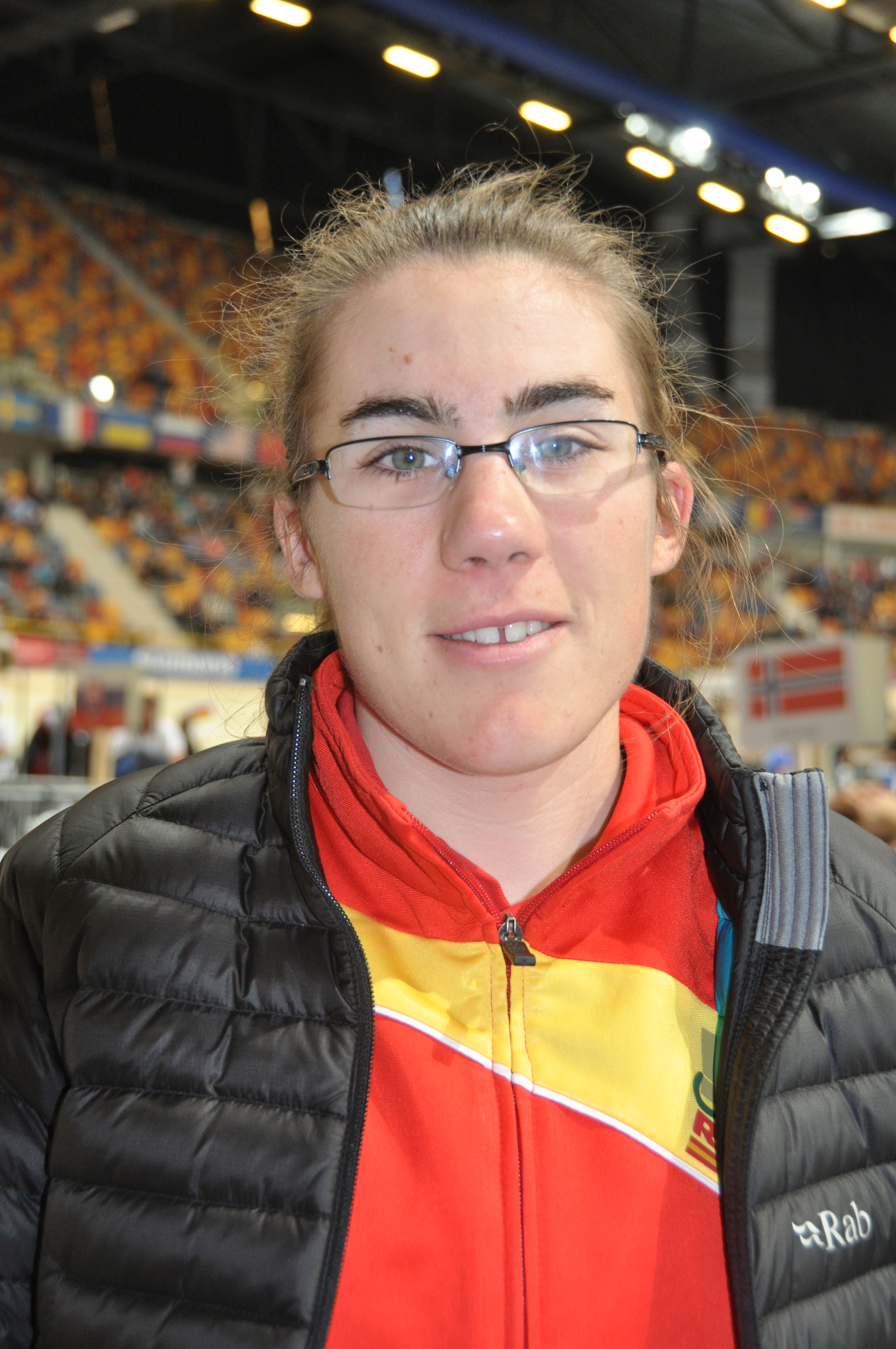

Personal information
- Full name: Ana Usabiaga Balerdi
- Born: 19 January 1990 (age 36)

Cycling career
- Sport: Cycling
- Discipline: Track cycling
- Role: Rider

Ana Usabiaga Balerdi (born 19 January 1990) is a Spanish female track cyclist. She competed in the points race event at the 2014 UCI Track Cycling World Championships.

== Major results ==
2014
Copa Cuba de Pista

1st Points Race
3rd Scratch Race

3 Jours d'Aigle

3rd Individual Pursuit
3rd Points Race

2015
Trofeu CAR Anadia Portugal

1st Scratch Race
2nd Omnium

2nd Points Race, Grand Prix of Poland
Trofeu Ciutat de Barcelona

2nd Scratch Race
3rd Points Race

2016
Trofeu Ciutat de Barcelona

2nd Points Race
2nd Scratch Race

3rd Scratch Race, Trofeu CAR Anadia Portugal
2017
3rd Scratch Race, TROFEU CIUTAT DE BARCELONA-Memorial Miquel Poblet
