= Tatjana Paller =

German cyclist

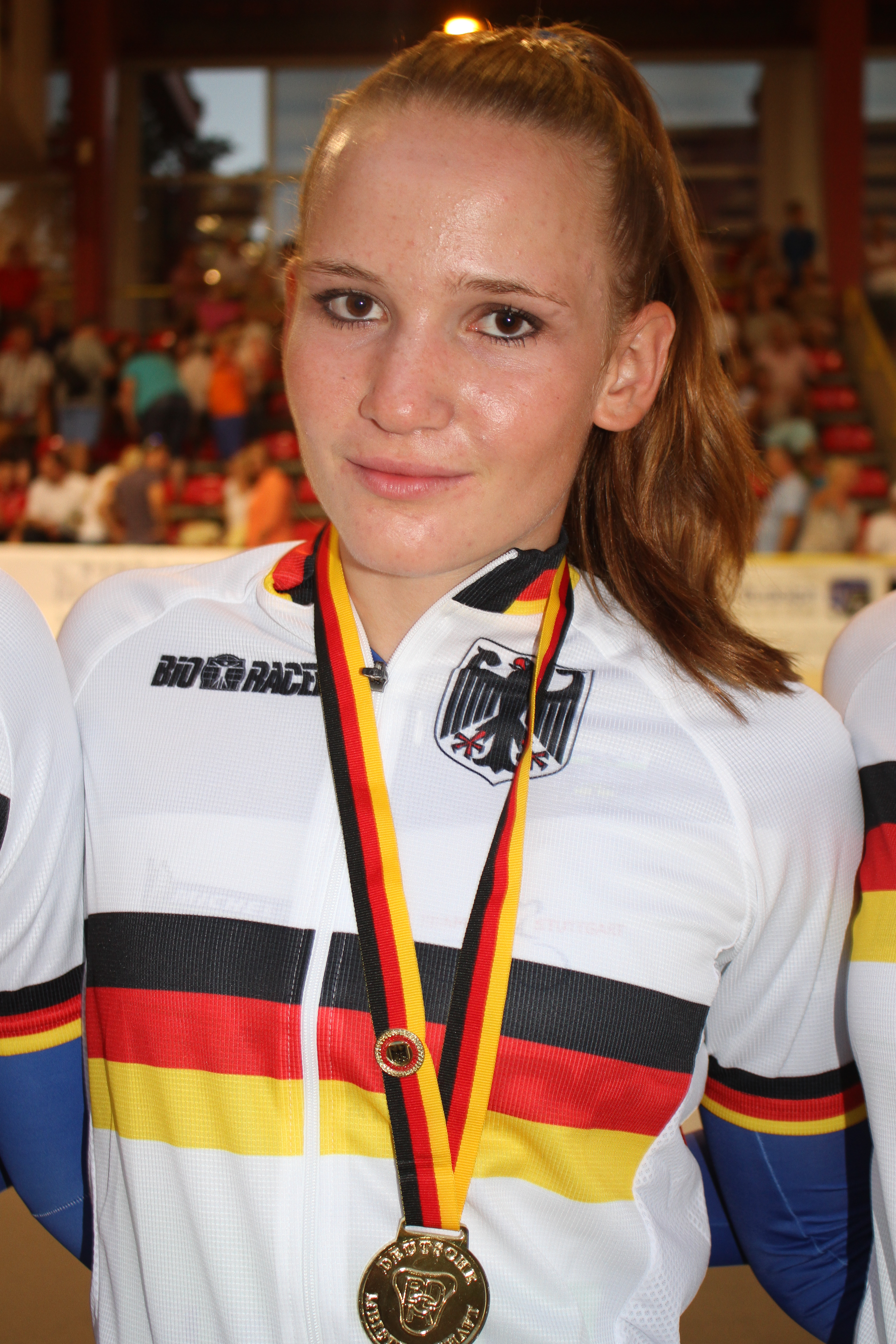
- Paller in 2016

Personal information
- Born: 7 September 1995 (age 30) Starnberg, Germany

Sport
- Country: Germany
- Sport: Ski mountaineering, Track cycling

Tatjana Paller (born 7 September 1995 in Starnberg) is a German female track cyclist and ski mountaineer, representing Germany at international competitions. She competed at the 2016 UEC European Track Championships in the team pursuit. She competed in ski mountaineering at the 2026 Winter Olympics, where she finished fourth in the women's sprint event.

== Career results ==
2016
3rd Points Race, UEC U23 European Track Championships
2017
1st Points Race, UEC U23 European Track Championships
2025
3rd Sprint Race, 2025 World Championship of Ski Mountaineering
