= Hong Kong Velodrome =

Velodrome in Tseung Kwan O, Hong Kong

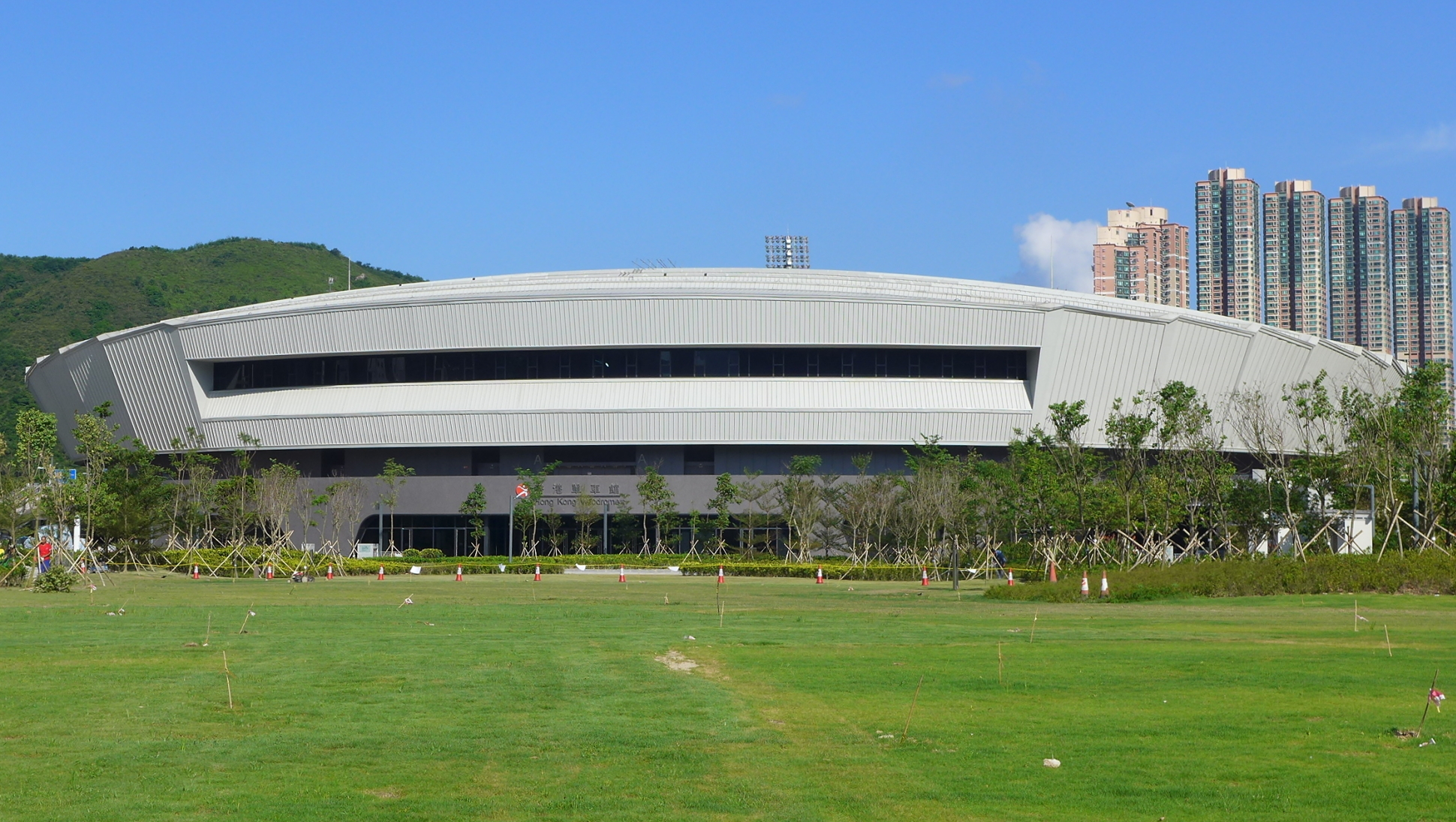
- Hong Kong Velodrome in May 2014
- Interactive map of Hong Kong Velodrome
- Location: 105-107 Po Hong Road, Tseung Kwan O, Sai Kung District, New Territories, Hong Kong
- Coordinates: 22°18′47″N 114°15′44″E
- Owner: Hong Kong Government
- Operator: Leisure and Cultural Services Department
- Capacity: 3,000 (velodrome)
- Surface: Wood
- Field size: 250 metres

Construction
- Groundbreaking: 2010; 16 years ago
- Built: 2010–2013
- Opened: 30 December 2013; 12 years ago
- Cost: HK$1.13 billion
- Architect: P & T Architects & Engineers Ltd.
- Structural engineer: Ove Arup and Partners HK Ltd
- Services engineer: WSP Hong Kong Ltd
- General contractor: Shui on Construction Co Ltd

Tenant
- Hong Kong Cycling Association

Hong Kong Velodrome
- Traditional Chinese: 香港單車館
- Simplified Chinese: 香港单车馆
Transcriptions
Standard Mandarin
- Hanyu Pinyin: Xiānggǎng Dānchē Guǎn
Yue: Cantonese
- Jyutping: hoeng1 gong2 daan1 ce1 gun2

Hong Kong Velodrome is a velodrome in Tseung Kwan O, Hong Kong. It has a 250-metre cycling track and spectator facilities for 3,000 people. It opened on 30 December 2013 next to the Tseung Kwan O Sports Ground.

== History ==
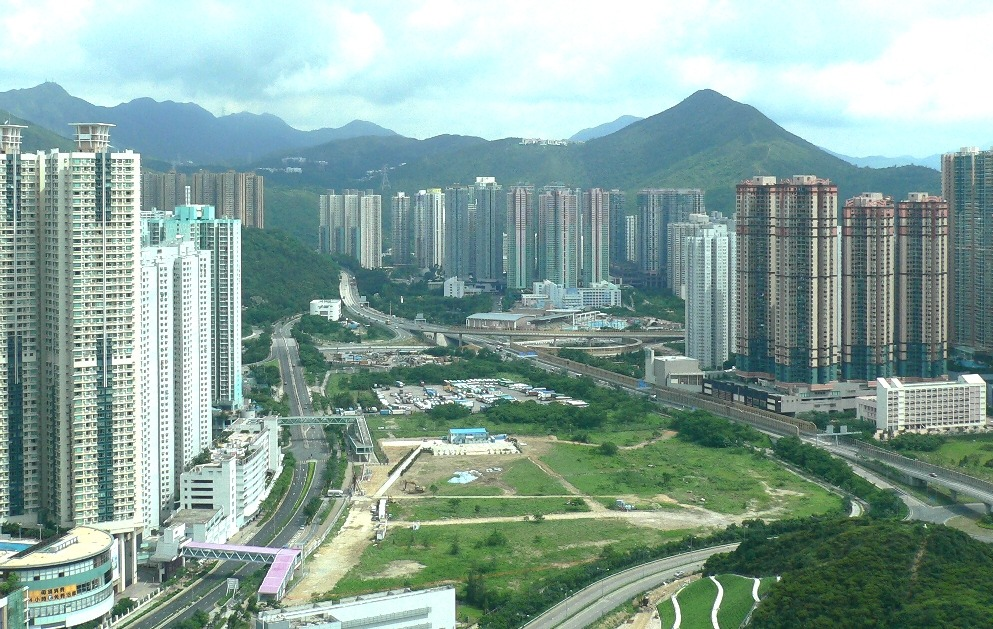
Tseung Kwan O Velodrome site in 2006.

The Hong Kong government agreed to build the velodrome after Wong Kam-po won the gold medal for the men's road race in the 2006 Asian Games at Doha, amid concerns that athletes who represent Hong Kong had to rely on training facilities in China. Construction of the HK$1.1 billion venue got the legislative go-ahead in January 2010 and work began two months later.

On 5 November 2012, Chief Secretary Carrie Lam kicked off construction of the Tseung Kwan O Velodrome, as it was then known. The velodrome occupies 6.6 hectares, and cycling helmets inspired its wavy rooftop design. Mrs Lam officiated at the ceremony marking the start of construction.

The velodrome officially opened on 30 December 2013. The inaugural international event, the 2014 Hong Kong International Track Cup (a UCI class-one event), was held 10–12 January 2014.

On 3 March 2014, Lleyton Hewitt, Tomas Berdych, Sam Stosur and Li Na played in the BNP Paribas Showdown exhibition tennis matches at the Velodrome, all 3,000 tickets were sold out. Li and Stosur were complimentary about the unusual location for a tennis event, which featured ground-level VIP seating on either side and spectator stands at both ends inside the 250-metre cycling track.

On 2 May 2015, the International Cycling Union (UCI) awarded the final leg of its 2015–16 UCI Track Cycling World Cup to Hong Kong, The Cycling Association of Hong Kong hosted a round of the World Cup for the first time on 16–17 January 2016. Racing took place at the Hong Kong Velodrome.

In March 2016, the UCI announced that the Hong Kong Velodrome had been selected as the venue for the 2017 UCI Track Cycling World Championships.

== Facilities ==
=== Velodrome ===
The velodrome comprises a 250-metre long, 7-metre wide wooden cycling track surrounded by 2,000 fixed seats and 1,000 retractable seats. Supporting facilities include changing rooms, a press conference room, drug testing rooms, and a pressroom.

=== Sports centre ===
The space within the centre of the cycle track forms a multi-purpose area for basketball, volleyball, badminton, gymnastics and other sports, but the space is closed to the public whenever the cycling track is being used.

The remainder of the public sports centre is located on the ground floor, beneath the cycle track level, comprising a table tennis room, a dance room, a fitness room, activity rooms, and a children's playroom.

=== Town park ===
The Hong Kong Velodrome Park is a 5.3-hectare park surrounding the velodrome building. The park includes grassy lawns, a restaurant, artificial lakes, a concrete skatepark, a jogging track, chess tables, an amphitheatre, and a climbing wall.

== See also ==
- List of cycling tracks and velodromes

Preceded by London Velodrome; London	UCI Track Cycling World Championships; Venue; 2017	Succeeded by Omnisport Apeldoorn; Apeldoorn
