= Anita Stenberg =

Norwegian cyclist

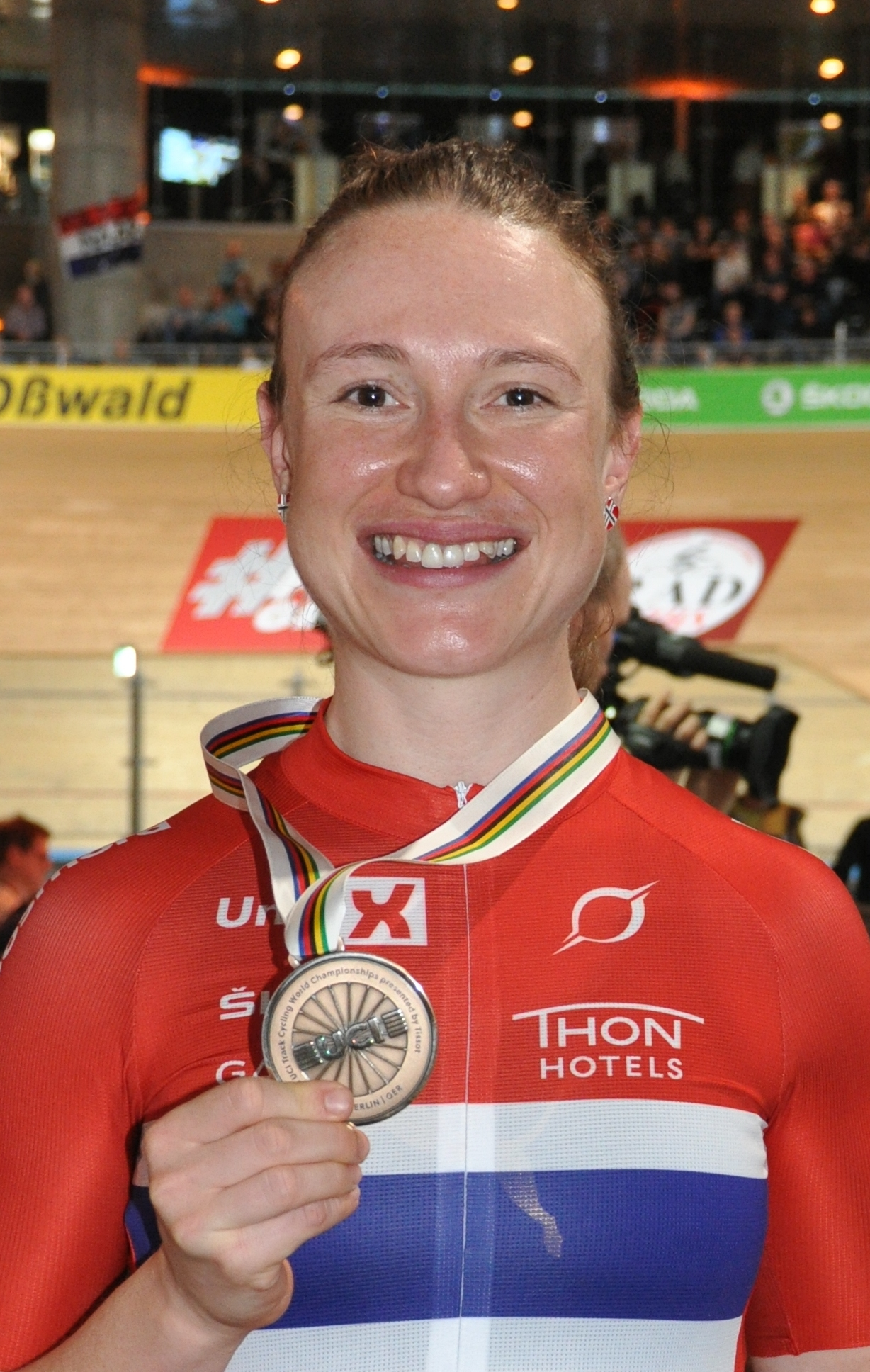
- Stenberg in 2020

Personal information
- Full name: Anita Yvonne Stenberg
- Born: 28 August 1992 (age 34) Drammen, Norway

Cycling career
- Sport: Cycling
- Discipline: Track cycling
- Role: Rider
Medal record
Women's track cycling
Representing Norway
World Championships
Bronze medal – third place	2020 Berlin	Points race
Bronze medal – third place	2024 Ballerup	Omnium
European Championships
Gold medal – first place	2022 Munich	Scratch
Gold medal – first place	2023 Grenchen	Points race
Gold medal – first place	2024 Apeldoorn	Omnium
Gold medal – first place	2025 Heusden-Zolder	Points race
Silver medal – second place	2024 Apeldoorn	Points race
Silver medal – second place	2026 Konya	Omnium

Anita Yvonne Stenberg (born 28 August 1992) is a Norwegian female track cyclist, representing Norway at international competitions. She competed at the 2016 UEC European Track Championships in the points race event and scratch event. At the 2016 Norwegian National Track Championships, Stenberg won seven elite national titles in the 500m time trial, pursuit, keirin, omnium, points race, scratch race and sprint.

== Major results ==
2013
3rd Scratch Race, Grand Prix Vienna
2014
National Track Championships

1st 500m Time Trial
1st Individual Pursuit
1st Team Sprint

2nd Scratch Race, Track-Cycling Challenge Grenchen
3rd Omnium, Athens Track Grand Prix

2015
National Track Championships

1st 500m Time Trial
1st Individual Pursuit
1st Keirin
1st Omnium
1st Points Race
1st Scratch race
1st Individual Sprint

1st Scratch Race, Milton International Challenge
2nd Points Race, International Belgian Open
Prova Internacional de Anadia

2nd Scratch Race
3rd Omnium

3rd Omnium, Six Days of Ghent

2016
National Track Championships

1st 500m Time Trial
1st Individual Pursuit
1st Keirin
1st Omnium
1st Points Race
1st Scratch race
1st Team Sprint

Trofeu Ciutat de Barcelona

1st Points Race
1st Scratch Race

2nd Scratch race, Six Days of Bremen
2nd Omnium, Six Days of Ghent
Fenioux Piste International

2nd Points Race
3rd Scratch Race

2017
National Track Championships

1st Points Race
1st Individual Sprint
1st Keirin

Nordic Championships

1st Keirin
1st Points Race
1st Sprint

1st Omnium, Keirin Cup / Madison Cup
1st Points Race, International track race – Panevežys
2nd Omnium, US Sprint GP
2nd Omnium, Fastest Man on Wheels
