= Rachele Barbieri =

Italian cyclist

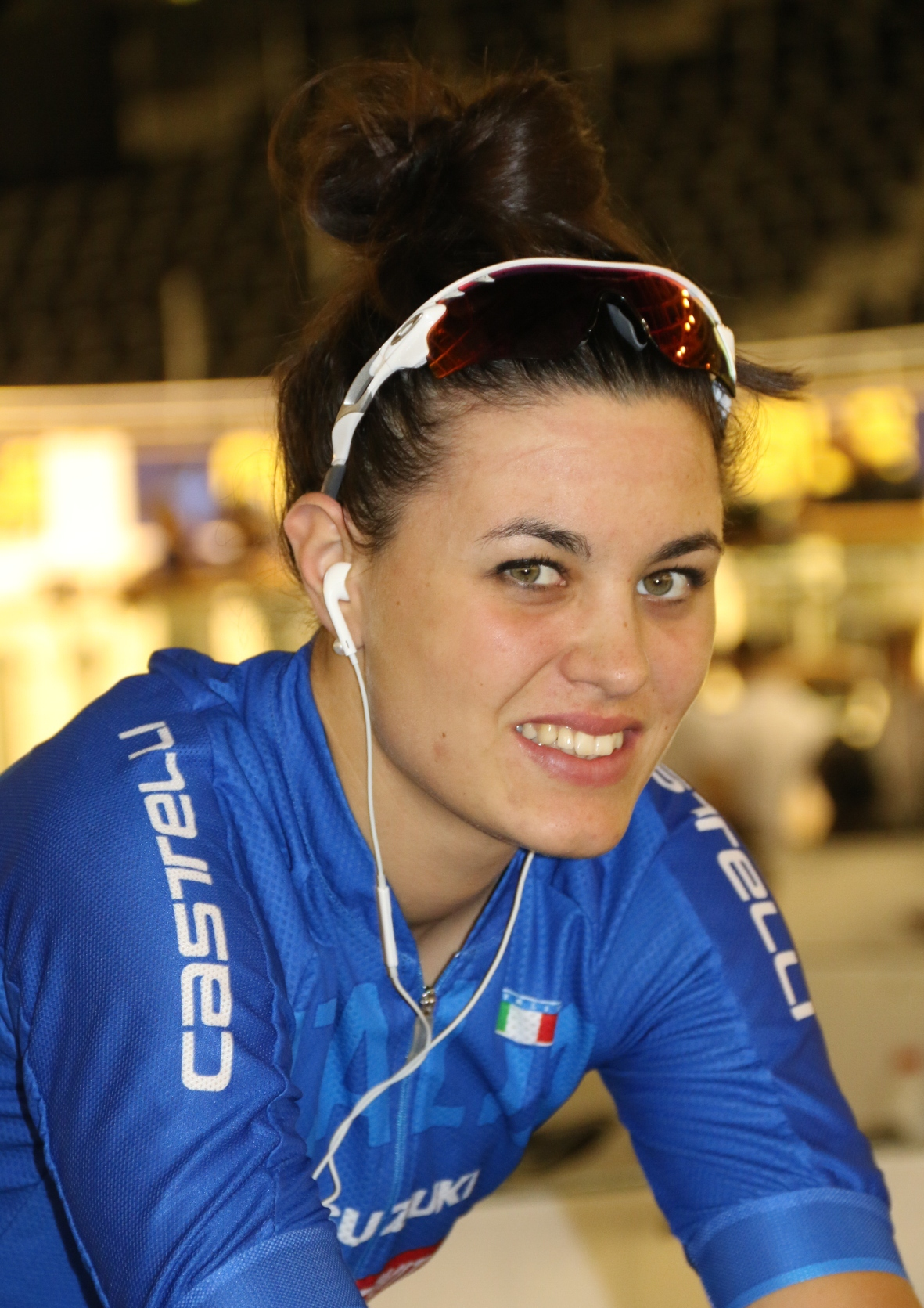
- Barbieri in 2017

Personal information
- Full name: Rachele Barbieri
- Born: 21 February 1997 (age 29) Pavullo nel Frignano, Italy
- Height: 1.67 m (5 ft 6 in)
- Weight: 55 kg (121 lb)

Cycling career
- Sport: Cycling
- Current team: Team Picnic–PostNL
- Disciplines: Road; Track
- Role: Rider

Professional teams
- 2016–2017: Cylance Pro Cycling
- 2018: Wiggle High5
- 2019: Bepink
- 2022–2023: Liv Racing TeqFind
- 2024: Team dsm–firmenich PostNL
- 2025-: Team Picnic–PostNL
Medal record
Representing Italy
Event	1st	2nd	3rd
World Championships	1	1	0
European Championships	2	4	2
European U23 Championships	2	0	1
European Junior Championships	2	1	0
Total	7	6	3
Senior level
Women's track cycling
World Championships
Gold medal – first place	2017 Hong Kong	Scratch
Silver medal – second place	2022 Saint-Quentin-en-Yvelines	Elimination race
European Championships
Gold medal – first place	2022 Munich	Omnium
Gold medal – first place	2022 Munich	Madison
Silver medal – second place	2020 Plovdiv	Elimination race
Silver medal – second place	2020 Plovdiv	Team pursuit
Silver medal – second place	2021 Grenchen	Team pursuit
Silver medal – second place	2022 Munich	Team pursuit
Bronze medal – third place	2021 Grenchen	Omnium
Women's road cycling
European Championships
Bronze medal – third place	2022 Munich	Road race
Mediterranean Games
Gold medal – first place	2026 Taranto	Road race
Youth level
Gold medal – first place	2015 Athens	Points race
Gold medal – first place	2015 Athens	Team pursuit
Gold medal – first place	2016 Montichiari	Scratch
Gold medal – first place	2017 Sangalhos	Scratch
Silver medal – second place	2015 Tartu	Road Race
Bronze medal – third place	2017 Sangalhos	Madison

Rachele Barbieri (born 21 February 1997) is an Italian professional road and track cyclist, who rides for UCI Women's WorldTeam Team Picnic–PostNL.

She won the women's scratch race at the 2017 UCI Track Cycling World Championships. Barbieri is an athlete of the Gruppo Sportivo Fiamme Oro.

== Major results ==
=== Track ===
2015
UEC Junior European Track Championships

1st Team Pursuit
1st Points Race

2nd Road Race, UEC Junior European Road Championships
2nd Points Race, 6 Giorni delle Rose - Fiorenzuola (Under-23)

2016
1st Scratch Race, UEC Under-23 European Track Championships
2nd Overall 6 Giorni delle Rose - Fiorenzuola

1st Points Race
1st Scratch Race
2nd Omnium

2nd Scratch Race, UEC European Track Championships
National Track Championships

2nd Scratch Race
2nd Team Sprint
3rd Team Pursuit

3rd Scratch race, 3 Jours d'Aigle

2017
1st Scratch race, UCI Track Cycling World Championships
UEC Under-23 European Track Championships

1st Scratch Race
2nd Madison

1st Scratch Race, UCI Track Cycling World Cup – Manchester
6 Giorni di Torino Internazionale

1st Scratch Race
2nd Points Race
3rd Omnium

3rd Madison, Belgian International Track Meeting

2018
1st Omnium, National Track Championships

2019
3rd Keirin, National Track Championships

2020
2nd Elimination Race, UEC European Track Championships
2nd Elimination Race, National Track Championships

2021
National Track Championships

1st Madison
1st Points Race
3rd Omnium

UEC European Track Championships

2nd Team Pursuit
3rd Omnium

2022
UEC European Track Championships

1st Omnium
1st Madison

=== Road ===
2015
2nd Road race, European Junior Championships
2017
4th Road race, European Under-23 Championships
9th Gran Premio Beghelli Internazionale Donne Elite
2018
6th GP della Liberazione
2019
10th Vuelta a la Comunitat Valenciana Feminas
2022
1st Omloop der Kempen
1st Stage 3 Bloeizone Fryslân Tour
2nd Road race, National Championships
2nd GP Eco Struct
3rd Road race, European Championships
3rd Scheldeprijs
3rd Veenendaal–Veenendaal
6th Dwars door Vlaanderen
2023
4th Veenendaal–Veenendaal
4th Omloop der Kempen
4th Scheldeprijs
2024
3rd Acht van Westerveld
4th Road race, National Championships
2025
3rd Schwalbe Women's One Day Classic
