= Verena Eberhardt =

Austrian cyclist (born 1994)

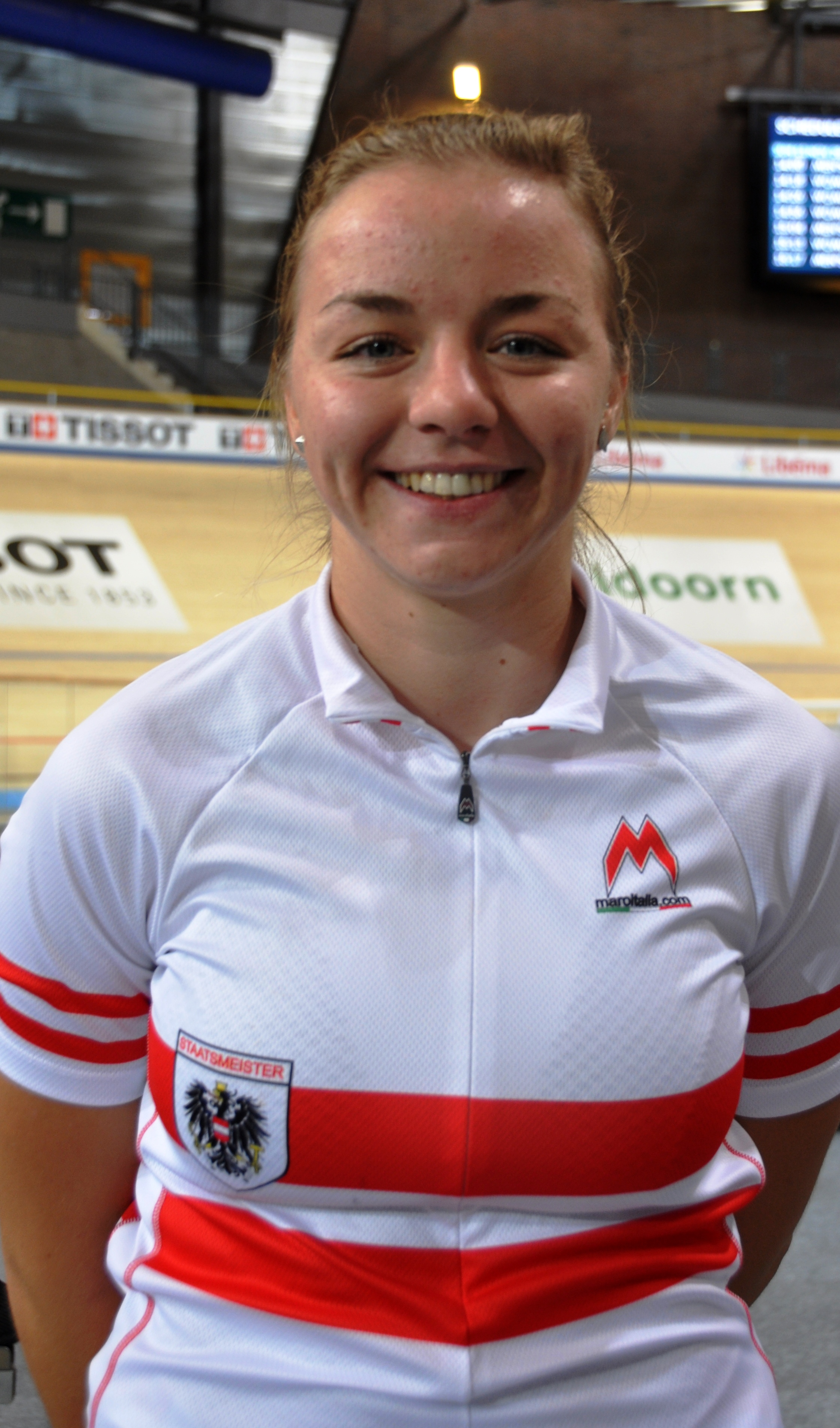

Personal information
- Full name: Verena Eberhardt
- Born: 6 December 1994 (age 31) St. Martin in der Wart, Austria

Cycling career
- Sport: Cycling
- Disciplines: Track; Road
- Role: Rider
- Rider type: Sprinter

Amateur teams
- 2011: RSC ARBÖ Südburgenland
- 2013–2014: Bigla Cycling Team
- 2015: De Sprinters Malderen
- 2016: Footon-Velosport
- 2017: Maaslandster Nicheliving CCN
- 2019: RSC ARBÖ Südburgenland
- 2020: Illi-Bikes Cycling Team

Professional team
- 2021: Team Rupelcleaning–Champion Lubricants
Medal record
Women's track cycling
Representing Austria
European Games
Silver medal – second place	2019 Minsk	Points race

Verena Eberhardt (born 6 December 1994) is an Austrian road and track cyclist, who rode for the UCI Women's Continental Team IBCT in 2021. Representing Austria at international competitions, Eberhardt competed in the 2016 UEC European Track Championships in the points race event and scratch event.

== Major results ==
2013
National Track Championships

1st Individual pursuit
2nd Omnium
2nd Points race
2nd 500m Time Trial
3rd Scratch race

2nd National U23 Road Championships, Time Trial

2014
National Track Championships

1st 500m Time Trial
1st Individual pursuit
1st Points race
1st Scratch
1st Omnium

2015
GP Czech Cycling Federation

2nd Points Race
2nd Scratch Race
3rd 500m Time Trial

2016
National Track Championships

1st 500m Time Trial
1st Individual pursuit
1st Points race
1st Scratch
1st Elimination race

Dublin Track Cycling International

1st Points Race
2nd Keirin
2nd Scratch Race
3rd Omnium
3rd Individual Pursuit

2017
National Track Championships

1st Sprint
1st 500m Time Trial
1st Individual pursuit
1st Points race
1st Scratch
1st Omnium

2018
National Track Championships

1st Points race
1st Scratch race
1st Omnium
