= List of teams and cyclists in the 2023 Tour de France Femmes =

List of cyclists

The following is a list of teams and riders that participated in the 2023 Tour de France Femmes.

154 riders across 22 seven-member teams took part in the 2023 Tour de France Femmes. Twenty-seven nationalities took part, with the largest percentage being Dutch (19% of the peloton). 109 riders finished the event.

== Teams ==
22 teams participated in the race. Each team had seven riders, one more than the 2022 edition. All 15 UCI Women's WorldTeams were automatically invited. They were joined by 7 UCI Women's Continental Teams – the two best 2022 UCI Women's Continental Teams (Ceratizit–WNT Pro Cycling and Lifeplus–Wahoo) received an automatic invitation, and the other five teams were selected by Amaury Sport Organisation (ASO), the organisers of the Tour. The teams were announced on 14 April 2023.

UCI Women's WorldTeams

- Canyon//SRAM
- EF Education–Tibco–SVB
- FDJ–Suez
- Fenix–Deceuninck
- Human Powered Health
- Israel Premier Tech Roland
- Lidl–Trek
- Liv Racing TeqFind
- Movistar Team
- SD Worx
- Team DSM
- Team Jayco–AlUla
- Team Jumbo–Visma
- UAE Team ADQ
- Uno-X Pro Cycling Team

UCI Women's Continental Teams

- AG Insurance–Soudal–Quick-Step
- Ceratizit–WNT Pro Cycling
- Cofidis
- Lifeplus Wahoo
- St. Michel–Mavic–Auber93
- Team Coop–Hitec Products

== Cyclists ==
Legend
No.	Starting number worn by the rider during the Tour
Pos.	Position in the general classification
Time	Deficit to the winner of the general classification
‡	Denotes riders born on or after 1 January 2001 eligible for the young rider classification
General classification	Denotes the winner of the general classification
Points classification	Denotes the winner of the points classification
Mountains classification	Denotes the winner of the mountains classification
Young rider classification	Denotes the winner of the young rider classification (eligibility indicated by ‡)
Team classification	Denotes riders that represent the winner of the team classification
Super-combativity award	Denotes the winner of the super-combativity award
DNS	Denotes a rider who did not start a stage, followed by the stage before which she withdrew
DNF	Denotes a rider who did not finish a stage, followed by the stage in which she withdrew
DSQ	Denotes a rider who was disqualified from the race, followed by the stage in which this occurred
OTL	Denotes a rider finished outside the time limit, followed by the stage in which they did so
COV	Denotes a rider who withdrawn because of COVID-19 either because she tested positive or two members of team tested positive, followed by the stage before which he withdrew
Ages correct as of Sunday 23 July 2023, the date on which the Tour begins

=== By starting number ===
No.	Name	Nationality	Team	Age	Pos.	Time	Ref.
1	Annemiek van Vleuten	Netherlands	Movistar Team	40	4	+ 3' 59"	
2	Aude Biannic	France	Movistar Team	32	84	+ 1h 10' 27"	
3	Sheyla Gutiérrez	Spain	Movistar Team	29	89	+ 1h 15' 53"	
4	Emma Norsgaard	Denmark	Movistar Team	23	70	+ 1h 00' 24"	
5	Liane Lippert	Germany	Movistar Team	25	20	+18' 02"	
6	Floortje Mackaij	Netherlands	Movistar Team	27	65	+ 57' 04"	
7	Paula Patiño	Colombia	Movistar Team	26	25	+ 26' 21"	
11	Demi Vollering	Netherlands	SD Worx	26	1	25h 17' 35"	
12	Mischa Bredewold	Netherlands	SD Worx	23	63	+ 55' 56"	
13	Elena Cecchini	Italy	SD Worx	31	95	+ 1h 23' 42"	
14	Lotte Kopecky	Belgium	SD Worx	27	2	+ 3' 03"	
15	Christine Majerus	Luxembourg	SD Worx	36	60	+ 55' 18"	
16	Marlen Reusser	Switzerland	SD Worx	31	28	+ 30' 00"	
17	Lorena Wiebes	Netherlands	SD Worx	24	DNS-5	–	
21	Katarzyna Niewiadoma	Poland	Canyon//SRAM	28	3	+ 3' 03"	
22	Ricarda Bauernfeind	Germany	Canyon//SRAM	23	9	+ 9' 56"	
23	Elise Chabbey	Switzerland	Canyon//SRAM	30	36	+ 40' 14"	
24	Soraya Paladin	Italy	Canyon//SRAM	30	42	+ 43' 32"	
25	Sarah Roy	Australia	Canyon//SRAM	37	90	+ 1h 16' 02"	
26	Agnieszka Skalniak-Sójka	Poland	Canyon//SRAM	26	54	+ 51' 18"	
27	Alice Towers ‡	Great Britain	Canyon//SRAM	20	44	+ 44' 37"	
31	Marianne Vos	Netherlands	Team Jumbo–Visma	36	DNF-7	–	
32	Anna Henderson	Great Britain	Team Jumbo–Visma	24	68	+ 58' 07"	
33	Amber Kraak	Netherlands	Team Jumbo–Visma	28	17	+ 17' 11"	
34	Coryn Labecki	United States	Team Jumbo–Visma	30	103	+ 1h 27' 35"	
35	Riejanne Markus	Netherlands	Team Jumbo–Visma	28	11	+ 10' 32"	
36	Karlijn Swinkels	Netherlands	Team Jumbo–Visma	24	76	+ 1h 03' 21"	
37	Eva van Agt	Netherlands	Team Jumbo–Visma	26	DNF-2	–	
41	Silvia Persico	Italy	UAE Team ADQ	25	14	+ 14' 00"	
42	Alena Amialiusik		UAE Team ADQ	34	43	+ 44' 22"	
43	Olivia Baril	Canada	UAE Team ADQ	25	29	+ 32' 39"	
44	Chiara Consonni	Italy	UAE Team ADQ	24	DNS-7	–	
45	Eleonora Camilla Gasparrini ‡	Italy	UAE Team ADQ	21	32	+ 35' 33"	
46	Elizabeth Holden	Great Britain	UAE Team ADQ	25	59	+ 55' 02"	
47	Erica Magnaldi	Italy	UAE Team ADQ	30	13	+ 13' 51"	
51	Juliette Labous	France	Team dsm–firmenich	24	5	+ 4' 48"	
52	Léa Curinier ‡	France	Team dsm–firmenich	22	37	+ 40' 32"	
53	Pfeiffer Georgi	Great Britain	Team dsm–firmenich	22	61	+ 55' 35"	
54	Megan Jastrab ‡	United States	Team dsm–firmenich	21	111	+ 1h 37' 47"	
55	Charlotte Kool	Netherlands	Team dsm–firmenich	24	OTL-7	–	
56	Esmée Peperkamp	Netherlands	Team dsm–firmenich	26	48	+ 46' 06"	
57	Elise Uijen ‡	Netherlands	Team dsm–firmenich	20	DNF-4	–	
61	Elisa Balsamo	Italy	Lidl–Trek	25	DNS-7	–	
62	Lucinda Brand	Netherlands	Lidl–Trek	34	52	+ 50' 23"	
63	Elizabeth Deignan	Great Britain	Lidl–Trek	34	35	+ 39' 56"	
64	Lauretta Hanson	Australia	Lidl–Trek	28	87	+ 1h 12' 50"	
65	Elisa Longo Borghini	Italy	Lidl–Trek	31	DNS-7	–	
66	Ilaria Sanguineti	Italy	Lidl–Trek	29	109	+ 1h 35' 56"	
67	Amanda Spratt	Australia	Lidl–Trek	35	10	+ 10' 14"	
71	Cecilie Uttrup Ludwig	Denmark	FDJ–Suez	27	7	+ 9' 09"	
72	Loes Adegeest	Netherlands	FDJ–Suez	26	DNF-7	–	
73	Grace Brown	Australia	FDJ–Suez	31	31	+ 35' 12"	
74	Marta Cavalli	Italy	FDJ–Suez	25	19	+ 17' 49"	
75	Vittoria Guazzini	Italy	FDJ–Suez	22	114	+ 1h 41' 22"	
76	Évita Muzic	France	FDJ–Suez	24	DNF-5	–	
77	Jade Wiel	France	FDJ–Suez	23	67	+ 57' 37"	
81	Veronica Ewers	United States	EF Education–Tibco–SVB	28	DNS-7	–	
82	Letizia Borghesi	Italy	EF Education–Tibco–SVB	24	62	+ 55' 37"	
83	Kathrin Hammes	Germany	EF Education–Tibco–SVB	34	50	+ 48' 46"	
84	Alison Jackson	Canada	EF Education–Tibco–SVB	34	108	+ 1h 31' 50"	
85	Sara Poidevin	Canada	EF Education–Tibco–SVB	27	80	+ 1h 08' 41"	
86	Magdeleine Vallieres ‡	Canada	EF Education–Tibco–SVB	21	97	+ 1h 24' 48"	
87	Georgia Williams	New Zealand	EF Education–Tibco–SVB	29	58	+ 54' 59"	
91	Mavi García	Spain	Liv Racing TeqFind	39	DNS-8	–	
92	Caroline Andersson ‡	Sweden	Liv Racing TeqFind	21	45	+ 45' 13"	
93	Rachele Barbieri	Italy	Liv Racing TeqFind	26	DNF-4	–	
94	Thalita de Jong	Netherlands	Liv Racing TeqFind	29	66	+ 57' 13"	
95	Jeanne Korevaar	Netherlands	Liv Racing TeqFind	26	101	+ 1h 26' 59"	
96	Silke Smulders ‡	Netherlands	Liv Racing TeqFind	22	46	+ 45' 25"	
97	Quinty Ton	Netherlands	Liv Racing TeqFind	24	56	+ 54' 27"	
101	Ashleigh Moolman	South Africa	AG Insurance–Soudal–Quick-Step	37	6	+ 5' 21"	
102	Mireia Benito	Spain	AG Insurance–Soudal–Quick-Step	26	DNF-1	–	
103	Maaike Boogaard	Netherlands	AG Insurance–Soudal–Quick-Step	24	91	+ 1h 19' 20"	
104	Julia Borgström ‡	Sweden	AG Insurance–Soudal–Quick-Step	22	47	+ 45' 55"	
105	Justine Ghekiere	Belgium	AG Insurance–Soudal–Quick-Step	27	22	+ 22' 31"	
106	Lotta Henttala	Finland	AG Insurance–Soudal–Quick-Step	34	DSQ-6	–	
107	Romy Kasper	Germany	AG Insurance–Soudal–Quick-Step	35	38	+ 40' 42"	
111	Julie De Wilde ‡	Belgium	Fenix–Deceuninck	20	82	+ 1h 10' 07"	
112	Sanne Cant	Belgium	Fenix–Deceuninck	32	85	+ 1h 11' 49"	
113	Yara Kastelijn	Netherlands	Fenix–Deceuninck	25	26	+ 26' 42"	
114	Evy Kuijpers	Netherlands	Fenix–Deceuninck	28	104	+ 1h 29' 25"	
115	Christina Schweinberger	Austria	Fenix–Deceuninck	26	39	+ 41' 42"	
116	Marthe Truyen	Belgium	Fenix–Deceuninck	23	73	+ 1h 02' 06"	
117	Julie Van de Velde	Belgium	Fenix–Deceuninck	30	57	+ 54' 36"	
121	Claire Steels	Great Britain	Israel Premier Tech Roland	36	18	+ 17' 21"	
122	Fien Delbaere	Belgium	Israel Premier Tech Roland	27	DNF-2	–	
123	Tamara Dronova		Israel Premier Tech Roland	29	21	+ 19' 18"	
124	Nathalie Eklund	Sweden	Israel Premier Tech Roland	32	102	+ 1h 27' 32"	
125	Elena Hartmann	Switzerland	Israel Premier Tech Roland	32	79	+ 1h 06' 46"	
126	Elizabeth Stannard	Australia	Israel Premier Tech Roland	26	53	+ 51' 16"	
127	Lara Vieceli	Italy	Israel Premier Tech Roland	30	DNS-2	–	
131	Anouska Koster	Netherlands	Uno-X Pro Cycling Team	29	40	+ 42' 23"	
132	Susanne Andersen	Norway	Uno-X Pro Cycling Team	25	93	+ 1h 22' 41"	
133	Maria Giulia Confalonieri	Italy	Uno-X Pro Cycling Team	30	DNS-7	–	
134	Marte Berg Edseth	Norway	Uno-X Pro Cycling Team	24	DNF-3	–	
135	Hannah Ludwig	Germany	Uno-X Pro Cycling Team	23	71	+ 1h 00' 53"	
136	Wilma Olausson ‡	Sweden	Uno-X Pro Cycling Team	22	106	+ 1h 30' 26"	
137	Mie Bjørndal Ottestad	Norway	Uno-X Pro Cycling Team	26	DNS-5	–	
141	Coralie Demay	France	St. Michel–Mavic–Auber93	30	27	+ 28' 22"	
142	Sandrine Bideau	France	St. Michel–Mavic–Auber93	34	112	+ 1h 38' 03"	
143	Simone Boilard	Canada	St. Michel–Mavic–Auber93	23	34	+ 37' 18"	
144	Camille Fahy ‡	France	St. Michel–Mavic–Auber93	20	86	+ 1h 12' 47"	
145	Célia Le Mouel	France	St. Michel–Mavic–Auber93	23	88	+ 1h 13' 38"	
146	Dilyxine Miermont	France	St. Michel–Mavic–Auber93	23	64	+ 56' 40"	
147	Margot Pompanon	France	St. Michel–Mavic–Auber93	26	81	+ 1h 08' 54"	
151	Audrey Cordon-Ragot	France	Human Powered Health	33	33	+ 36' 54"	
152	Alice Barnes	Great Britain	Human Powered Health	28	OTL-7	–	
153	Henrietta Christie ‡	New Zealand	Human Powered Health	21	105	+ 1h 29' 28"	
154	Antri Christoforou	Cyprus	Human Powered Health	31	119	+ 1h 51' 26"	
155	Barbara Malcotti	Italy	Human Powered Health	23	24	+ 25' 08"	
156	Marjolein van 't Geloof	Netherlands	Human Powered Health	27	123	+ 2h 10' 20"	
157	Eri Yonamine	Japan	Human Powered Health	32	78	+ 1h 05' 40"	
161	Clara Koppenburg	Germany	Cofidis	27	15	+ 14' 38"	
162	Martina Alzini	Italy	Cofidis	26	DNF-7	–	
163	Morgane Coston	France	Cofidis	32	74	+ 1h 02' 12"	
164	Špela Kern	Slovenia	Cofidis	33	DNS-3	–	
165	Rachel Neylan	Australia	Cofidis	41	49	+ 47' 29"	
166	Gabrielle Pilote Fortin	Canada	Cofidis	30	DNF-5	–	
167	Josie Talbot	Australia	Cofidis	26	122	+ 1h 56' 01"	
171	Ane Santesteban	Spain	Team Jayco–AlUla	32	8	+ 9' 36"	
172	Jessica Allen	Australia	Team Jayco–AlUla	30	118	+ 1h 47' 01"	
173	Teniel Campbell	Trinidad and Tobago	Team Jayco–AlUla	25	99	+ 1h 25' 24"	
174	Georgie Howe	Australia	Team Jayco–AlUla	29	96	+ 1h 24' 24"	
175	Nina Kessler	Netherlands	Team Jayco–AlUla	35	94	+ 1h 23' 16"	
176	Alexandra Manly	Australia	Team Jayco–AlUla	27	75	+ 1h 02' 46"	
177	Amber Pate	Australia	Team Jayco–AlUla	28	72	+ 1h 01' 08"	
181	Margaux Vigie	France	Lifeplus Wahoo	28	110	+ 1h 36' 37"	
182	Natalie Grinczer	Great Britain	Lifeplus Wahoo	29	30	+ 34' 34"	
183	Typhaine Laurance	France	Lifeplus Wahoo	24	120	+ 1h 51' 49"	
184	Kaja Rysz	Poland	Lifeplus Wahoo	24	DNF-5	–	
185	April Tacey	Great Britain	Lifeplus Wahoo	22	116	+ 1h 43' 15"	
186	Babette van der Wolf ‡	Netherlands	Lifeplus Wahoo	19	DNF-7	–	
187	Ella Wyllie ‡	New Zealand	Lifeplus Wahoo	20	16	+ 15' 35"	
191	Cédrine Kerbaol ‡	France	Ceratizit–WNT Pro Cycling	22	12	+ 12' 27"	
192	Sandra Alonso	Spain	Ceratizit–WNT Pro Cycling	24	92	+ 1h 19' 25"	
193	Alice Maria Arzuffi	Italy	Ceratizit–WNT Pro Cycling	28	41	+ 43' 00"	
194	Nina Berton ‡	Luxembourg	Ceratizit–WNT Pro Cycling	21	83	+ 1h 10' 08"	
195	Arianna Fidanza	Italy	Ceratizit–WNT Pro Cycling	28	98	+ 1h 25' 18"	
196	Marta Lach	Poland	Ceratizit–WNT Pro Cycling	26	51	+ 49' 28"	
197	Kathrin Schweinberger	Austria	Ceratizit–WNT Pro Cycling	26	100	+ 1h 25' 40"	
201	Danielle de Francesco	Australia	Arkéa Pro Cycling Team	31	77	+ 1h 05' 26"	
202	Clara Edmond	Canada	Arkéa Pro Cycling Team	26	23	+ 25' 05"	
203	Maaike Coljé	Netherlands	Arkéa Pro Cycling Team	26	55	+ 53' 45"	
204	Amandine Fouquenet ‡	France	Arkéa Pro Cycling Team	22	DNF-2	–	
205	Anastasiya Kolesava		Arkéa Pro Cycling Team	23	115	+ 1h 42' 46"	
206	Marie-Morgane le Deuff ‡	France	Arkéa Pro Cycling Team	21	OTL-6	–	
207	Anais Morichon	France	Arkéa Pro Cycling Team	23	DNF-4	–	
211	Jenny Rissveds	Sweden	Team Coop–Hitec Products	29	DNS-5	–	
212	Stine Dale	Norway	Team Coop–Hitec Products	24	107	+ 1h 30' 56"	
213	India Grangier	France	Team Coop–Hitec Products	23	117	+ 1h 44' 27"	
214	Sigrid Ytterhus Haugset	Norway	Team Coop–Hitec Products	24	69	+ 59' 34"	
215	Tiril Jørgensen	Norway	Team Coop–Hitec Products	22	113	+ 1h 40' 58"	
216	Lucie Jounier	France	Team Coop–Hitec Products	25	DNF-3	–	
217	Josie Nelson ‡	Great Britain	Team Coop–Hitec Products	21	121	+ 1h 52' 39"	

=== By team ===
(Spain) Movistar Team (MOV)
No.	Rider	Pos.
1	Annemiek van Vleuten (NED)	4
2	Aude Biannic (FRA)	84
3	Sheyla Gutiérrez (ESP)	89
4	Emma Norsgaard (DEN)	70
5	Liane Lippert (GER)	20
6	Floortje Mackaij (NED)	65
7	Paula Patiño (COL)	25

(Netherlands) SD Worx (SDW)
No.	Rider	Pos.
11	Demi Vollering (NED)	1
12	Mischa Bredewold (NED)	63
13	Elena Cecchini (ITA)	95
14	Lotte Kopecky (BEL)	2
15	Christine Majerus (LUX)	60
16	Marlen Reusser (SUI)	28
17	Lorena Wiebes (NED)	DNS-5

(Germany) Canyon//SRAM (CSR)
No.	Rider	Pos.
21	Katarzyna Niewiadoma (POL)	3
22	Ricarda Bauernfeind (GER)	9
23	Elise Chabbey (SUI)	36
24	Soraya Paladin (ITA)	42
25	Sarah Roy (AUS)	90
26	Agnieszka Skalniak-Sójka (POL)	54
27	Alice Towers (GBR)	44

(Netherlands) Team Jumbo–Visma (JVW)
No.	Rider	Pos.
31	Marianne Vos (NED)	DNF-7
32	Anna Henderson (GBR)	68
33	Amber Kraak (NED)	17
34	Coryn Labecki (USA)	103
35	Riejanne Markus (NED)	11
36	Karlijn Swinkels (NED)	76
37	Eva van Agt (NED)	DNF-2

(United Arab Emirates) UAE Team ADQ (UAD)
No.	Rider	Pos.
41	Silvia Persico (ITA)	14
42	Alena Amialiusik	43
43	Olivia Baril (CAN)	29
44	Chiara Consonni (ITA)	DNS-7
45	Eleonora Camilla Gasparrini (ITA)	32
46	Elizabeth Holden (GBR)	59
47	Erica Magnaldi (ITA)	13

(Netherlands) Team dsm–firmenich (DSM)
No.	Rider	Pos.
51	Juliette Labous (FRA)	5
52	Léa Curinier (FRA)	37
53	Pfeiffer Georgi (GBR)	61
54	Megan Jastrab (USA)	111
55	Charlotte Kool (NED)	OTL-7
56	Esmée Peperkamp (NED)	48
57	Elise Uijen (NED)	DNF-4

(United States) Lidl–Trek (LTK)
No.	Rider	Pos.
61	Elisa Balsamo (ITA)	DNS-7
62	Lucinda Brand (NED)	52
63	Elizabeth Deignan (GBR)	35
64	Lauretta Hanson (AUS)	87
65	Elisa Longo Borghini (ITA)	DNS-7
66	Ilaria Sanguineti (ITA)	109
67	Amanda Spratt (AUS)	10

(France) FDJ–Suez (FUT)
No.	Rider	Pos.
71	Cecilie Uttrup Ludwig (DEN)	7
72	Loes Adegeest (NED)	DNF-7
73	Grace Brown (AUS)	31
74	Marta Cavalli (ITA)	19
75	Vittoria Guazzini (ITA)	114
76	Évita Muzic (FRA)	DNF-5
77	Jade Wiel (FRA)	67

(United States) EF Education–Tibco–SVB (TIB)
No.	Rider	Pos.
81	Veronica Ewers (USA)	DNS-7
82	Letizia Borghesi (ITA)	62
83	Kathrin Hammes (GER)	50
84	Alison Jackson (CAN)	108
85	Sara Poidevin (CAN)	80
86	Magdeleine Vallieres (CAN)	97
87	Georgia Williams (NZL)	58

(Netherlands) Liv Racing TeqFind (DSB)
No.	Rider	Pos.
91	Mavi García (ESP)	DNS-8
92	Caroline Andersson (SWE)	45
93	Rachele Barbieri (ITA)	DNF-4
94	Thalita de Jong (NED)	66
95	Jeanne Korevaar (NED)	101
96	Silke Smulders (NED)	46
97	Quinty Ton (NED)	56

(Belgium) AG Insurance–Soudal–Quick-Step (AGS)
No.	Rider	Pos.
101	Ashleigh Moolman (RSA)	6
102	Mireia Benito (ESP)	DNF-1
103	Maaike Boogaard (NED)	91
104	Julia Borgström (SWE)	47
105	Justine Ghekiere (BEL)	22
106	Lotta Henttala (FIN)	DSQ-6
107	Romy Kasper (GER)	38

(Belgium) Fenix–Deceuninck (FED)
No.	Rider	Pos.
111	Julie De Wilde (BEL)	82
112	Sanne Cant (BEL)	85
113	Yara Kastelijn (NED)	26
114	Evy Kuijpers (NED)	104
115	Christina Schweinberger (AUT)	39
116	Marthe Truyen (BEL)	73
117	Julie Van de Velde (BEL)	57

(Switzerland) Israel Premier Tech Roland (CGS)
No.	Rider	Pos.
121	Claire Steels (GBR)	18
122	Fien Delbaere (BEL)	DNF-2
123	Tamara Dronova	21
124	Nathalie Eklund (SWE)	102
125	Elena Hartmann (SUI)	79
126	Elizabeth Stannard (AUS)	53
127	Lara Vieceli (ITA)	DNS-2

(Norway) Uno-X Pro Cycling Team (UXT)
No.	Rider	Pos.
131	Anouska Koster (NED)	40
132	Susanne Andersen (NOR)	93
133	Maria Giulia Confalonieri (ITA)	DNS-7
134	Marte Berg Edseth (NOR)	DNF-3
135	Hannah Ludwig (GER)	71
136	Wilma Olausson (SWE)	106
137	Mie Bjørndal Ottestad (NOR)	DNS-5

(France) St. Michel–Mavic–Auber93 (AUB)
No.	Rider	Pos.
141	Coralie Demay (FRA)	27
142	Sandrine Bideau (FRA)	112
143	Simone Boilard (CAN)	34
144	Camille Fahy (FRA)	86
145	Célia Le Mouel (FRA)	88
146	Dilyxine Miermont (FRA)	64
147	Margot Pompanon (FRA)	81

(United States) Human Powered Health (HPW)
No.	Rider	Pos.
151	Audrey Cordon-Ragot (FRA)	33
152	Alice Barnes (GBR)	OTL-7
153	Henrietta Christie (NZL)	105
154	Antri Christoforou (CYP)	119
155	Barbara Malcotti (ITA)	24
156	Marjolein van 't Geloof (NED)	123
157	Eri Yonamine (JPN)	78

(France) Cofidis (COF)
No.	Rider	Pos.
161	Clara Koppenburg (GER)	15
162	Martina Alzini (ITA)	DNF-7
163	Morgane Coston (FRA)	74
164	Špela Kern (SLO)	DNS-3
165	Rachel Neylan (AUS)	49
166	Gabrielle Pilote Fortin (CAN)	DNF-5
167	Josie Talbot (AUS)	122

(Australia) Team Jayco–AlUla (JAY)
No.	Rider	Pos.
171	Ane Santesteban (ESP)	8
172	Jessica Allen (AUS)	118
173	Teniel Campbell (TRI)	99
174	Georgie Howe (AUS)	96
175	Nina Kessler (NED)	94
176	Alexandra Manly (AUS)	75
177	Amber Pate (AUS)	72

(United Kingdom) Lifeplus Wahoo (DRP)
No.	Rider	Pos.
181	Margaux Virgie (FRA)	110
182	Natalie Grinczer (GBR)	30
183	Typhaine Laurance (FRA)	120
184	Kaja Rysz (POL)	DNF-5
185	April Tacey (GBR)	116
186	Babette van der Wolf (NED)	DNF-7
187	Ella Wyllie (NZL)	16

(Germany) Ceratizit–WNT Pro Cycling (WNT)
No.	Rider	Pos.
191	Cédrine Kerbaol (FRA)	12
192	Sandra Alonso (ESP)	92
193	Alice Maria Arzuffi (ITA)	41
194	Nina Berton (LUX)	83
195	Arianna Fidanza (ITA)	98
196	Marta Lach (POL)	51
197	Kathrin Schweinberger (AUT)	100

(France) Arkéa Pro Cycling Team (ARK)
No.	Rider	Pos.
201	Danielle De Francesco (AUS)	77
202	Clara Edmond (CAN)	23
203	Maaike Coljé (NED)	55
204	Amandine Fouquenet (FRA)	DNF-2
205	Anastasiya Kolesava	115
206	Marie-Morgane Le Deunff (FRA)	OTL-6
207	Anais Morichon (FRA)	DNF-4

(Norway) Team Coop–Hitec Products (HPU)
No.	Rider	Pos.
211	Jenny Rissveds (SWE)	DNS-5
212	Stine Dale (NOR)	107
213	India Grangier (FRA)	117
214	Sigrid Ytterhus Haugset (NOR)	69
215	Tiril Jørgensen (NOR)	113
216	Lucie Jounier (FRA)	DNF-3
217	Josie Nelson (GBR)	121

=== By nationality ===
Country	No. of riders	Finished	Stage wins
Australia	12	12	
Austria	2	2	
Belgium	7	6	1 (Lotte Kopecky)
Canada	7	6	
Colombia	1	1	
Cyprus	1	1	
Denmark	2	2	1 (Emma Norsgaard)
Finland	1	0	
France	21	16	
Germany	6	6	2 (Ricarda Bauernfeind, Liane Lippert)
Great Britain	10	9	
Italy	19	12	
Japan	1	1	
Luxembourg	2	2	
Netherlands	27	20	3 (Yara Kastelijn, Demi Vollering, Lorena Wiebes)
New Zealand	3	3	
Norway	6	4	
Poland	4	3	
Slovenia	1	0	
South Africa	1	1	
Spain	5	3	
Sweden	5	4	
Switzerland	3	3	1 (Marlen Reusser)
Trinidad and Tobago	1	1	
United States	3	2	
	3	3	
Total	154	123	8
