= 2023 Tour de France Femmes, Stage 1 to Stage 8 =

The 2023 Tour de France Femmes (officially Tour de France Femmes avec Zwift) was the second edition of the Tour de France Femmes. The race took place from 23 to 30 July 2023, and was the 21st race in the 2023 UCI Women's World Tour calendar.

== Overview ==
Stage characteristics
| Stage | Date | Course | Distance | Type | Winner |
|---|---|---|---|---|---|
| 1 | 23 July | Clermont-Ferrand | 123.8 km (76.9 mi) | Flat stage | Lotte Kopecky (BEL) |
| 2 | 24 July | Clermont-Ferrand to Mauriac | 151.7 km (94.3 mi) | Hilly stage | Liane Lippert (GER) |
| 3 | 25 July | Collonges-la-Rouge to Montignac-Lascaux | 147.2 km (91.5 mi) | Flat stage | Lorena Wiebes (NED) |
| 4 | 26 July | Cahors to Rodez | 177.1 km (110.0 mi) | Hilly stage | Yara Kastelijn (NED) |
| 5 | 27 July | Onet-le-Château to Albi | 126.1 km (78.4 mi) | Flat stage | Ricarda Bauernfeind (GER) |
| 6 | 28 July | Albi to Blagnac | 122.1 km (75.9 mi) | Flat stage | Emma Norsgaard (DEN) |
| 7 | 29 July | Lannemezan to Tourmalet Bagnères-de-Bigorre | 89.9 km (55.9 mi) | Mountain stage | Demi Vollering (NED) |
| 8 | 30 July | Pau | 22.6 km (14.0 mi) | Individual time trial | Marlen Reusser (SUI) |
| Total | | | 960.5 km (596.8 mi) | | |

== Classification standings ==
Legend
| Denotes the leader of the General classification | Denotes the leader of the Mountains classification |
| Denotes the leader of the Points classification | Denotes the leader of the Young rider classification |
| Denotes the leader of the Team classification | Denotes the winner of the Combativity award |

== Stage 1 ==
23 July 2023 – Clermont-Ferrand, 123.8 km (76.9 mi)

The first stage took the riders on a 123.8 km (76.9 mi) loop around Clermont-Ferrand that was generally flat, with a third category climb (Côte de Durtol) with an average gradient of 7.6% located 9.3 kilometres (5.8 mi) before the finish.

The first stage initially saw several attempts at a breakaway, with Marta Lach (Ceratizit–WNT Pro Cycling) being the most successful, opening a gap of 50" to the peloton before being caught ahead of the intermediate sprint in Saint-Hippolyte. After crashing at 27 kilometres (17 mi), Mireia Benito (AG Insurance–Soudal–Quick-Step) was forced to abandon and was taken to the hospital, but suffered no serious injuries other than a concussion.

With 300 metres remaining of the Côte de Durtol, Lotte Kopecky (SD Worx) launched an attack with 9.7 km (6.0 mi) left of the stage. Further accelerating within the final 5 kilometers of the stage, she eventually took a solo stage win by 41 seconds ahead of the peloton. Behind her, Lorena Wiebes (SD Worx) won the bunch sprint. The high pace set on the final climb led to splits in the peloton, with only 25 riders finishing within a minute of Wiebes.

Kopecky therefore took the maillot jaune (yellow jersey) of the general classification (GC), as well as the points classification and the Queen of the Mountains (QoM) classification. Cédrine Kerbaol (Ceratizit–WNT Pro Cycling) took the lead in the young rider classification.

Stage 1 Result
| Rank | Rider | Team | Time |
|---|---|---|---|
| 1 | Lotte Kopecky (BEL) | SD Worx | 3h 04' 09" |
| 2 | Lorena Wiebes (NED) | SD Worx | + 41" |
| 3 | Charlotte Kool (NED) | Team dsm–firmenich | + 41" |
| 4 | Marianne Vos (NED) | Team Jumbo–Visma | + 41" |
| 5 | Ashleigh Moolman Pasio (RSA) | AG Insurance–Soudal–Quick-Step | + 43" |
| 6 | Demi Vollering (NED) | SD Worx | + 43" |
| 7 | Tamara Dronova | Israel Premier Tech Roland | + 43" |
| 8 | Cecilie Uttrup Ludwig (DEN) | FDJ–Suez | + 43" |
| 9 | Mavi García (ESP) | Liv Racing TeqFind | + 43" |
| 10 | Elisa Longo Borghini (ITA) | Lidl–Trek | + 43" |

General classification after Stage 1
| Rank | Rider | Team | Time |
|---|---|---|---|
| 1 | Lotte Kopecky (BEL) | SD Worx | 3h 03' 59" |
| 2 | Lorena Wiebes (NED) | SD Worx | + 45" |
| 3 | Charlotte Kool (NED) | Team dsm–firmenich | + 47" |
| 4 | Marianne Vos (NED) | Team Jumbo–Visma | + 51" |
| 5 | Ashleigh Moolman Pasio (RSA) | AG Insurance–Soudal–Quick-Step | + 53" |
| 6 | Demi Vollering (NED) | SD Worx | + 53" |
| 7 | Tamara Dronova | Israel Premier Tech Roland | + 53" |
| 8 | Cecilie Uttrup Ludwig (DEN) | FDJ–Suez | + 53" |
| 9 | Mavi García (ESP) | Liv Racing TeqFind | + 53" |
| 10 | Elisa Longo Borghini (ITA) | Lidl–Trek | + 53" |

== Stage 2 ==
24 July 2023 – Clermont-Ferrand to Mauriac, 151.7 km (94.3 mi)

The second stage took the riders south from Clermont-Ferrand to Mauriac, over a hilly 151.7 km (94.3 mi) course with six categorised climbs. The final 5 kilometres (3.1 mi) of the stage included the Côte de Trebiac (3.4km with an average gradient of 5.8%) and the final 500m of the stage having an average gradient of 5.6%.

The second stage was held in cooler weather, with drizzle turning into heavy rain by the end of the stage. The first half of the stage featured several attacks by riders that were neutralised by the peloton. The climbs of Côtes des Plaines (4.5km with an average gradient of 5.5%) and the Côte des Boissieres (1.2km with an average gradient of 7.2%) split the bunch, with a minor crash delaying general classification contenders Annemiek van Vleuten (Movistar Team) and Elisa Longo Borghini (Lidl–Trek).

As the rain got heavier, several riders crashed in the last 20 kilometres (12 mi). One of the breakaway riders, Eva van Agt (Jumbo–Visma) had a serious crash on the descent of the final climb while trying to avoid a motorbike, with her contacting the crash barrier with her head. She was taken to hospital where it turned out she had a concussion.

In the final 5 kilometres (3.1 mi), Katarzyna Niewiadoma (Canyon–SRAM), Juliette Labous (DSM–Firmenich) and Marlen Reusser (SD Worx) all attempted individual attacks on the climb of the Côte de Trebiac, with the remaining peloton capturing them before the final kilometre. In the uphill sprint finish for the line, Demi Vollering (SD Worx) led out her teammate Kopecky, however Liane Lippert (Movistar Team) overtook Kopecky in the final 100 metres to take the stage.

After the stage, Kopecky realised she had a slow puncture that had dampened her sprint. Neither of the key GC favourites - Vollering or Van Vleuten - had attempted attacks on the stage, with Vollering stating that she wished to "save my legs for Wednesday and Saturday". Kopecky retained the yellow jersey of the general classification and the lead of the points classification, Kerbaol retained the lead of the young rider classification, and Yara Kastelijn (Fenix–Deceuninck) took the lead of the QoM classification.

Stage 2 Result
| Rank | Rider | Team | Time |
|---|---|---|---|
| 1 | Liane Lippert (GER) | Movistar Team | 4h 13' 43" |
| 2 | Lotte Kopecky (BEL) | SD Worx | + 0" |
| 3 | Silvia Persico (ITA) | UAE Team ADQ | + 0" |
| 4 | Ashleigh Moolman Pasio (RSA) | AG Insurance–Soudal–Quick-Step | + 0" |
| 5 | Christina Schweinberger (AUT) | Fenix–Deceuninck | + 0" |
| 6 | Cecilie Uttrup Ludwig (DEN) | FDJ–Suez | + 0" |
| 7 | Demi Vollering (NED) | SD Worx | + 0" |
| 8 | Katarzyna Niewiadoma (POL) | Canyon//SRAM | + 0" |
| 9 | Annemiek van Vleuten (NED) | Movistar Team | + 0" |
| 10 | Tamara Dronova | Israel Premier Tech Roland | + 0" |

General classification after Stage 2
| Rank | Rider | Team | Time |
|---|---|---|---|
| 1 | Lotte Kopecky (BEL) | SD Worx | 7h 17' 36" |
| 2 | Liane Lippert (GER) | Movistar Team | + 49" |
| 3 | Ashleigh Moolman Pasio (RSA) | AG Insurance–Soudal–Quick-Step | + 59" |
| 4 | Demi Vollering (NED) | SD Worx | + 59" |
| 5 | Cecilie Uttrup Ludwig (DEN) | FDJ–Suez | + 59" |
| 6 | Tamara Dronova | Israel Premier Tech Roland | + 59" |
| 7 | Elisa Longo Borghini (ITA) | Lidl–Trek | + 59" |
| 8 | Annemiek van Vleuten (NED) | Movistar Team | + 59" |
| 9 | Katarzyna Niewiadoma (POL) | Canyon//SRAM | + 59" |
| 10 | Ane Santesteban (ESP) | Team Jayco–AlUla | + 1' 03" |

== Stage 3 ==
25 July 2023 – Collonges-la-Rouge to Montignac-Lascaux, 147.2 km (91.5 mi)

The third stage took the riders west from Collonges-la-Rouge to Montignac-Lascaux over a 147.2 km (91.5 mi) course considered flat, albeit with five categorised climbs. However the final climb was 55 km (34 mi) from the finish, and therefore a bunch sprint was expected.

Prior to the stage, Špela Kern (Cofidis) withdrew from the race after her crash on stage 2. After just 4 kilometres (2.5 mi), Kathrin Hammes (EF Education–Tibco–SVB) escaped from the peloton for a solo breakaway, eventually establishing a lead of two minutes. After collecting seven QoM points, she was captured by the peloton with around 80 kilometres (50 mi) remaining. After several riders attempted attacks from the peloton, Julie Van de Velde (Fenix–Deceuninck) escaped with around 60 kilometres (37 mi) remaining. Taking four QoM points over the final two climbs of Côte des Andrieux (2.6 km with an average gradient of 4.1%) and Côte de Saint-Robert (1.1 km with an average gradient of 6.2%), she took the lead of the mountains classification while building up a lead of around a minute over the peloton. The sprinters teams in the peloton - including SD Worx, DSM–Firmenich and Jumbo–Visma - led the chase for the anticipated bunch sprint.

However Van de Velde extended her lead to 2 minutes with 35 kilometres (22 mi) remaining. The time gap between her and the peloton fell as the sprinters teams gave chase, but Van de Velde held on towards the finish - with a lead of 35 seconds with 5 kilometres (3.1 mi) to go, and a 10 second lead into the final kilometre of the stage. In the final sprint, the sprinters teams caught Van de Velde with 300 metres to go. Wiebes outsprinted Marianne Vos (Jumbo–Visma) for the stage win, with the yellow jersey of Kopecky finishing third.

A two second split at the finish allowed Kopecky to extend her GC lead over Lippert to 55", with other GC contenders including Vollering and Van Vleuten ten seconds further behind. Kopecky also retained her lead in the points classification, Van de Velde took the polka dot jersey of the QoM classification, and Kerbaol retained the lead of the young rider classification.

Stage 3 Result
| Rank | Rider | Team | Time |
|---|---|---|---|
| 1 | Lorena Wiebes (NED) | SD Worx | 3h 49' 47" |
| 2 | Marianne Vos (NED) | Team Jumbo–Visma | + 0" |
| 3 | Lotte Kopecky (BEL) | SD Worx | + 0" |
| 4 | Chiara Consonni (ITA) | UAE Team ADQ | + 0" |
| 5 | Elisa Balsamo (ITA) | Lidl–Trek | + 0" |
| 6 | Alexandra Manly (AUS) | Team Jayco–AlUla | + 0" |
| 7 | Charlotte Kool (NED) | Team dsm–firmenich | + 0" |
| 8 | Susanne Andersen (NOR) | Uno-X Pro Cycling Team | + 0" |
| 9 | Soraya Paladin (ITA) | Canyon//SRAM | + 2" |
| 10 | Julie De Wilde (BEL) | Fenix–Deceuninck | + 2" |

General classification after Stage 3
| Rank | Rider | Team | Time |
|---|---|---|---|
| 1 | Lotte Kopecky (BEL) | SD Worx | 11h 07' 19" |
| 2 | Liane Lippert (GER) | Movistar Team | + 55" |
| 3 | Ashleigh Moolman Pasio (RSA) | AG Insurance–Soudal–Quick-Step | + 1' 05" |
| 4 | Katarzyna Niewiadoma (POL) | Canyon//SRAM | + 1' 05" |
| 5 | Elisa Longo Borghini (ITA) | Lidl–Trek | + 1' 05" |
| 6 | Annemiek van Vleuten (NED) | Movistar Team | + 1' 05" |
| 7 | Tamara Dronova | Israel Premier Tech Roland | + 1' 05" |
| 8 | Demi Vollering (NED) | SD Worx | + 1' 05" |
| 9 | Cecilie Uttrup Ludwig (DEN) | FDJ–Suez | + 1' 05" |
| 10 | Amanda Spratt (AUS) | Lidl–Trek | + 1' 09" |

== Stage 4 ==
26 July 2023 – Cahors to Rodez, 177.1 km (110.0 mi)

The longest stage of the race took the riders eastwards over a 177.1 km (110.0 mi) hilly course from Cahors to Rodez. Five categorised climbs were on the route, with the second category Côte de Moyrazès (4.6km with an average gradient of 5.5%) and the third category Côte de Lavernhe (2.2km with an average gradient of 7.1%) located in the last 20 km (12 mi) of the stage. Another climb had bonus seconds available at the top. The last 500 metres of the stage in Rodez had an average gradient of 8.2%, with sections of 13%. It was considered that the GC contenders would attempt to win the stage, given the bonus seconds available at the finish.

The early break contained 14 riders, including the French national champion Audrey Cordon-Ragot (Human Powered Health), Anouska Koster (Jumbo–Visma) and Yara Kastelijn (Fenix–Deceuninck). The gap to the peloton slowly grew, reaching 6 minutes after 50 km (31 mi) and over 10 minutes after the climb of Côte de Falgevras. This put Cordon-Ragot in the virtual lead of the GC, as she had been 2' 21" behind Kopecky.

The peloton slowly picked up the pace, with SD Worx taking control to chase the breakaway as they hit the hilly section at the end of the stage. On the third category Côte de Colombiès (6.5 km with an average gradient of 4.2%), the gap to the break fell dramatically to four minutes. With around 30 km (19 mi) remaining, Cordon-Ragot sprinted to take the bonus seconds available at Limayrac. On the second category Côte de Moyrazès, Kastelijn and Cordon-Ragot broke clear from the breakaway group - however Cordon-Ragot was unable to hold the wheel and Kastelijn went solo to try and win the stage.

Behind them, the GC contenders were racing each other - with Kopecky giving chase to try and retain her yellow jersey. Vollering and Van Vleuten then attacked each other on the final climb of the stage, the third category Côte de Lavernhe, overtaking remains of the breakaway. Over the summit, Vollering attacked again with Van Vleuten struggling to follow. With key contenders coming back together, a fast pace was set approaching the tough finish in Rodez.

Vollering then attacked in the steep final kilometre, to finish two seconds ahead of Van Vleuten before celebrating as she thought she'd won the stage. However, Kastelijn had won the stage by 1' 11", her first major stage win in the UCI Women's World Tour. Other GC contenders finished within 30 seconds of Vollering, with no one losing substantial time. Cordon-Ragot finished 1' 45" behind Kastelijn, moving up 8 places on GC to 20th overall.

Kopecky therefore retained her yellow jersey of the GC, albeit with her lead cut to 43". Kopecky also retained her lead in the points classification. Vollering was in second place on GC, eight seconds ahead of her main rival Van Vleuten thanks to six bonus seconds at the finish line. Koster took the polka dot jersey of the QoM classification thanks to the points collected while in the breakaway, and Kerbaol retained the lead of the young rider classification.

Stage 4 Result
| Rank | Rider | Team | Time |
|---|---|---|---|
| 1 | Yara Kastelijn (NED) | Fenix–Deceuninck | 4h 38' 39" |
| 2 | Demi Vollering (NED) | SD Worx | + 1' 11" |
| 3 | Anouska Koster (NED) | Uno-X Pro Cycling Team | + 1' 12" |
| 4 | Annemiek van Vleuten (NED) | Movistar Team | + 1' 13" |
| 5 | Elisa Longo Borghini (ITA) | Lidl–Trek | + 1' 13" |
| 6 | Katarzyna Niewiadoma (POL) | Canyon//SRAM | + 1' 13" |
| 7 | Ashleigh Moolman Pasio (RSA) | AG Insurance–Soudal–Quick-Step | + 1' 13" |
| 8 | Célia Le Mouel (FRA) | St. Michel–Mavic–Auber93 | + 1' 13" |
| 9 | Kathrin Hammes (GER) | EF Education–Tibco–SVB | + 1' 23" |
| 10 | Alice Maria Arzuffi (ITA) | Ceratizit–WNT Pro Cycling | + 1' 23" |

General classification after Stage 4
| Rank | Rider | Team | Time |
|---|---|---|---|
| 1 | Lotte Kopecky (BEL) | SD Worx | 15h 47' 25" |
| 2 | Demi Vollering (NED) | SD Worx | + 43" |
| 3 | Ashleigh Moolman Pasio (RSA) | AG Insurance–Soudal–Quick-Step | + 51" |
| 4 | Katarzyna Niewiadoma (POL) | Canyon//SRAM | + 51" |
| 5 | Elisa Longo Borghini (ITA) | Lidl–Trek | + 51" |
| 6 | Annemiek van Vleuten (NED) | Movistar Team | + 51" |
| 7 | Yara Kastelijn (NED) | Fenix–Deceuninck | + 1' 00" |
| 8 | Liane Lippert (GER) | Movistar Team | + 1' 39" |
| 9 | Juliette Labous (FRA) | Team dsm–firmenich | + 1' 48" |
| 10 | Cecilie Uttrup Ludwig (DEN) | FDJ–Suez | + 1' 49" |

== Stage 5 ==
27 July 2023 – Onet-le-Château to Albi, 126.1 km (78.4 mi)

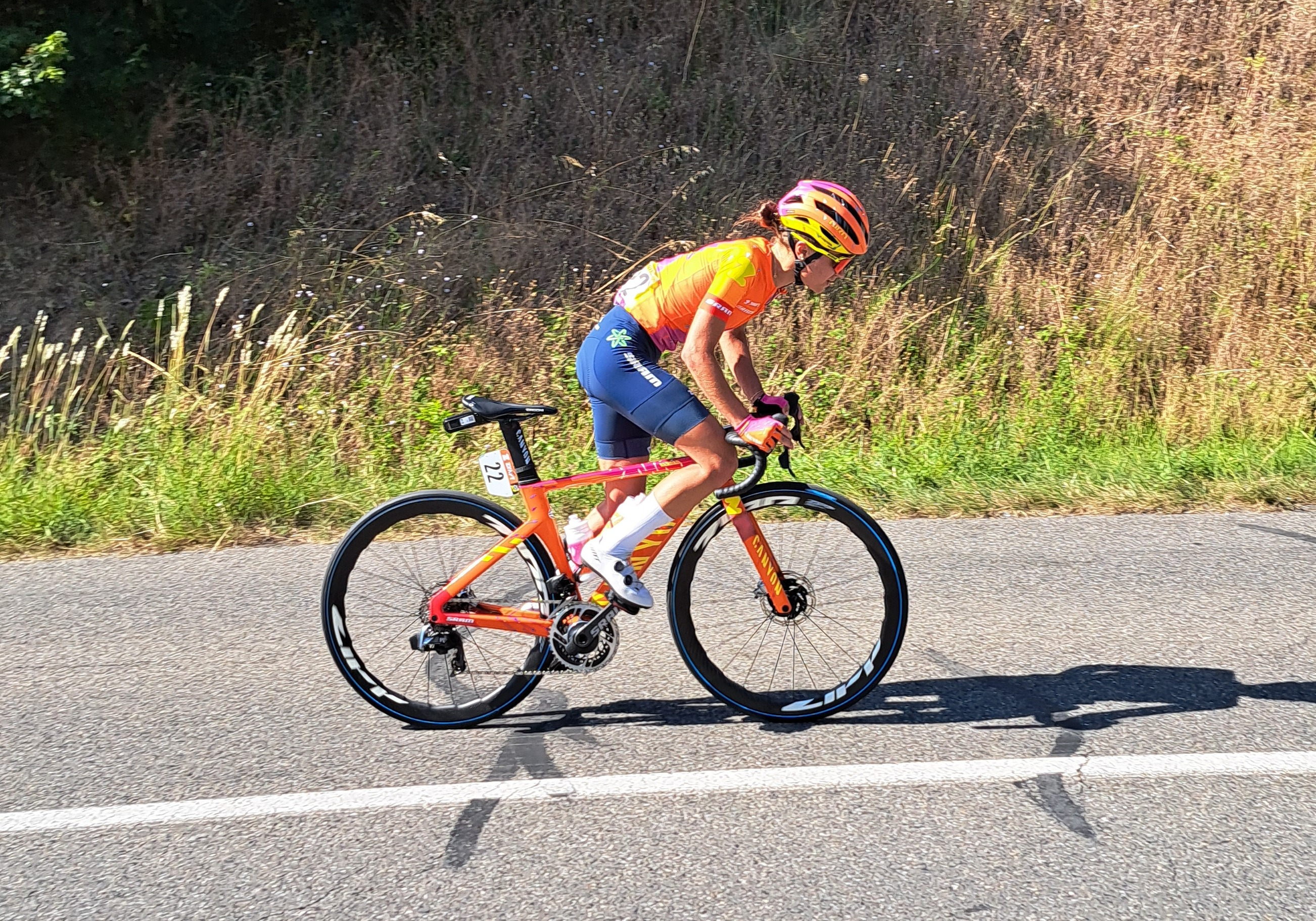
Ricarda Bauernfeind (Canyon–SRAM) with 4km remaining to the finish of the stage in Albi.

The fifth stage took the riders south from Onet-le-Château to Albi over a 126.1 km (78.4 mi) course considered flat, albeit with three categorised climbs. The final 20 km (12 mi) into Albi was generally flat, and a sprint finish was expected.

Prior to the start of the stage, SD Worx team director Anna van der Breggen reported that stage 3 winner Wiebes was sick, and would not start the stage. Évita Muzic (FDJ–Suez) abandoned the Tour due to illness early on in the stage - a setback for her team leader Cecilie Uttrup Ludwig. Kastelijn took the QoM points over the first two climbs of the stage, taking the lead in the mountains classification.

Vollering got a puncture with 65 km (40 mi) of the stage remaining and replaced the back wheel of her bike. She then drafted her team car to get back to the main bunch. Commissaires were unhappy about the length of time this occurred, with Vollering subsequently penalised 20 seconds in the general classification.

Ricarda Bauernfeind (Canyon–SRAM) then attacked on the descent of the Côte de Laguépie. She built up a lead of around 1' 30" ahead of the peloton, however this advantage fell on the final climb of the stage, the Côte de Monestiés. With 10 km (6.2 mi) remaining of the stage, Bauernfeind's lead was just 40 seconds. The peloton gave chase, however the gap did not fall fast enough to Bauernfeind, an experienced time trialist. With 4.5 km (2.8 mi) to go, the gap was still 30 seconds - with Lippert and Reusser attacking from the front of the peloton to catch her.

Bauernfeind was too strong, and crossed the finish line 22 seconds ahead of Lippert and Reusser, becoming the youngest ever winner of a stage at the Tour de France Femmes. She had averaged 44.9 kilometres per hour (27.9 mph) over the last 20 km (12 mi) of the stage. The peloton finished 10 seconds further behind, with Kopecky winning the sprint for the minor placings.

Kopecky retained the yellow jersey of the GC and extended her lead in the points classification to 47 points. Kastelijn took the polka dot jersey of the mountains classification, and Kerbaol retained the lead of the young rider classification.

Vollering's 20 second penalty dropped her to 7th place in the GC, 12 seconds behind her rival Van Vleuten. Following the stage, directeur sportif of SD Worx Danny Stam queried if commissaries were "capable of leading this Tour". He was subsequently removed from the race due to "inappropriate comments" made to the commissaires, as well as his "dangerous overtaking ... of cars and riders" while Vollering was drafting his car.

Stage 5 Result
| Rank | Rider | Team | Time |
|---|---|---|---|
| 1 | Ricarda Bauernfeind (GER) | Canyon//SRAM | 3h 07' 20" |
| 2 | Marlen Reusser (SUI) | SD Worx | + 22" |
| 3 | Liane Lippert (GER) | Movistar Team | + 22" |
| 4 | Lotte Kopecky (BEL) | SD Worx | + 32" |
| 5 | Soraya Paladin (ITA) | Canyon//SRAM | + 32" |
| 6 | Riejanne Markus (NED) | Team Jumbo–Visma | + 32" |
| 7 | Ane Santesteban (ESP) | Team Jayco–AlUla | + 32" |
| 8 | Ashleigh Moolman Pasio (RSA) | AG Insurance–Soudal–Quick-Step | + 32" |
| 9 | Elisa Longo Borghini (ITA) | Lidl–Trek | + 32" |
| 10 | Coralie Demay (FRA) | St. Michel–Mavic–Auber93 | + 32" |

General classification after Stage 5
| Rank | Rider | Team | Time |
|---|---|---|---|
| 1 | Lotte Kopecky (BEL) | SD Worx | 18h 55' 17" |
| 2 | Ashleigh Moolman Pasio (RSA) | AG Insurance–Soudal–Quick-Step | + 49" |
| 3 | Elisa Longo Borghini (ITA) | Lidl–Trek | + 51" |
| 4 | Katarzyna Niewiadoma (POL) | Canyon//SRAM | + 51" |
| 5 | Annemiek van Vleuten (NED) | Movistar Team | + 51" |
| 6 | Yara Kastelijn (NED) | Fenix–Deceuninck | + 1' 00" |
| 7 | Demi Vollering (NED) | SD Worx | + 1' 03" |
| 8 | Liane Lippert (GER) | Movistar Team | + 1' 29" |
| 9 | Ricarda Bauernfeind (GER) | Canyon//SRAM | + 1' 38" |
| 10 | Juliette Labous (FRA) | Team dsm–firmenich | + 1' 48" |

== Stage 6 ==
28 July 2023 – Albi to Blagnac, 122.1 km (75.9 mi)

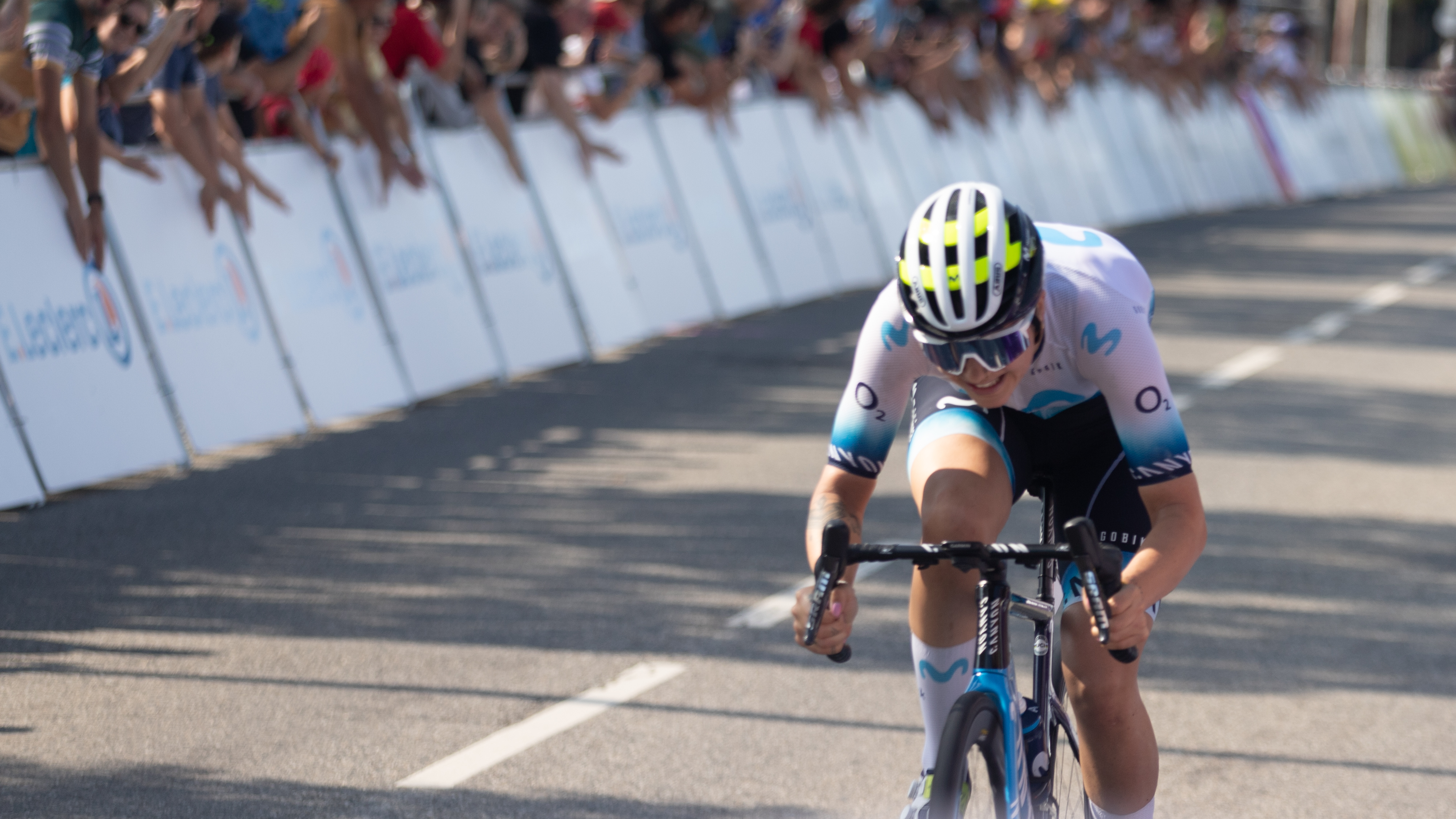
Emma Norsgaard (Movistar Team) at the finish of stage 6 into Blagnac

The sixth stage was the final flat stage of the race, over a 122.1 km (75.9 mi) course from Albi to Blagnac. Continuing to head south towards the Pyrenees, the stage had four categorised climbs before a flat finish in Blagnac. The stage was the final chance for sprinters to win, given the parcours of the remaining stages.

Early on in the stage, Lotta Henttala (AG Insurance–Soudal–Quick-Step) was disqualified after holding onto her team car. The directeur sportif of the team was also asked to leave the race. Henttala and AG Insurance–Soudal–Quick-Step later refuted the claims of the commissaires, stating that she "held onto a water bottle for a few seconds but did not hang onto the team car".

A three rider breakaway of Emma Norsgaard (Movistar Team), Agnieszka Skalniak-Sójka and Sandra Alonso was formed with around 70 kilometres (43 mi) to go, establishing a lead around 2 minutes. GC contender Veronica Ewers (EF Education–Tibco–SVB) crashed heavily with 50 kilometres (31 mi) remaining, landing in a ditch. After being attended to by doctors, she remounted to finish the stage inside the time cut, albeit in pain. Taken to hospital following the stage, it later transpired that Ewers had a broken collarbone and would not start stage 7.

In the closing kilometres, the gap to the break steadily fell as the sprinters teams gave chase, with Alonso dropping from the break with around 5km to go. Norsgaard did not give up, extending the gap back up to 20 seconds with 4 km (2.5 mi) to go. In the finale into Blagnac, the course crossed the Toulouse tramway just before the flamme rouge of 1 kilometre to go. The tight chicane over the tram tracks caused a small crash, distracting the peloton and delaying some riders as they gave chase. Riders subsequently criticised the chicane, with Ashleigh Moolman Pasio (AG Insurance–Soudal–Quick-Step) calling it "super, super dangerous".

With 600 metres to the finish, Norsgaard launched an attack to stay ahead of the peloton, as the gap collapsed behind her. Norsgaard held on to win the stage by a second, the fourth breakaway rider to win a stage at the Tour, and her first UCI Women's World Tour win. Behind her, Charlotte Kool (Team DSM–Firmenich) came second, with third placed Kopecky in the yellow jersey visibly annoyed not to have caught Norsgaard before the finish line.

Kopecky retained the yellow jersey of the GC and extended her lead in the points classification to 69 points. Kastelijn retained the polka dot jersey of the mountains classification, 4 points ahead of Koster. Kerbaol retained the lead of the young rider classification, with a 2' 45" lead over Ella Wyllie (Lifeplus–Wahoo).

Stage 6 Result
| Rank | Rider | Team | Time |
|---|---|---|---|
| 1 | Emma Norsgaard (DEN) | Movistar Team | 2h 59' 16" |
| 2 | Charlotte Kool (NED) | Team dsm–firmenich | + 1" |
| 3 | Lotte Kopecky (BEL) | SD Worx | + 1" |
| 4 | Marianne Vos (NED) | Team Jumbo–Visma | + 1" |
| 5 | Soraya Paladin (ITA) | Canyon//SRAM | + 1" |
| 6 | Chiara Consonni (ITA) | Team Jumbo–Visma | + 1" |
| 7 | Julie De Wilde (BEL) | Fenix–Deceuninck | + 1" |
| 8 | Marta Lach (POL) | Ceratizit–WNT Pro Cycling | + 1" |
| 9 | Vittoria Guazzini (ITA) | FDJ–Suez | + 1" |
| 10 | Agnieszka Skalniak-Sójka (POL) | Canyon//SRAM | + 1" |

General classification after Stage 6
| Rank | Rider | Team | Time |
|---|---|---|---|
| 1 | Lotte Kopecky (BEL) | SD Worx | 21h 54' 30" |
| 2 | Ashleigh Moolman Pasio (RSA) | AG Insurance–Soudal–Quick-Step | + 53" |
| 3 | Annemiek van Vleuten (NED) | Movistar Team | + 55" |
| 4 | Elisa Longo Borghini (ITA) | Lidl–Trek | + 55" |
| 5 | Katarzyna Niewiadoma (POL) | Canyon//SRAM | + 55" |
| 6 | Yara Kastelijn (NED) | Fenix–Deceuninck | + 1' 04" |
| 7 | Demi Vollering (NED) | SD Worx | + 1' 07" |
| 8 | Liane Lippert (GER) | Movistar Team | + 1' 29" |
| 9 | Ricarda Bauernfeind (GER) | Canyon//SRAM | + 1' 42" |
| 10 | Juliette Labous (FRA) | Team dsm–firmenich | + 1' 52" |

== Stage 7 ==
29 July 2023 – Lannemezan to Tourmalet Bagnères-de-Bigorre, 89.9 km (55.9 mi)

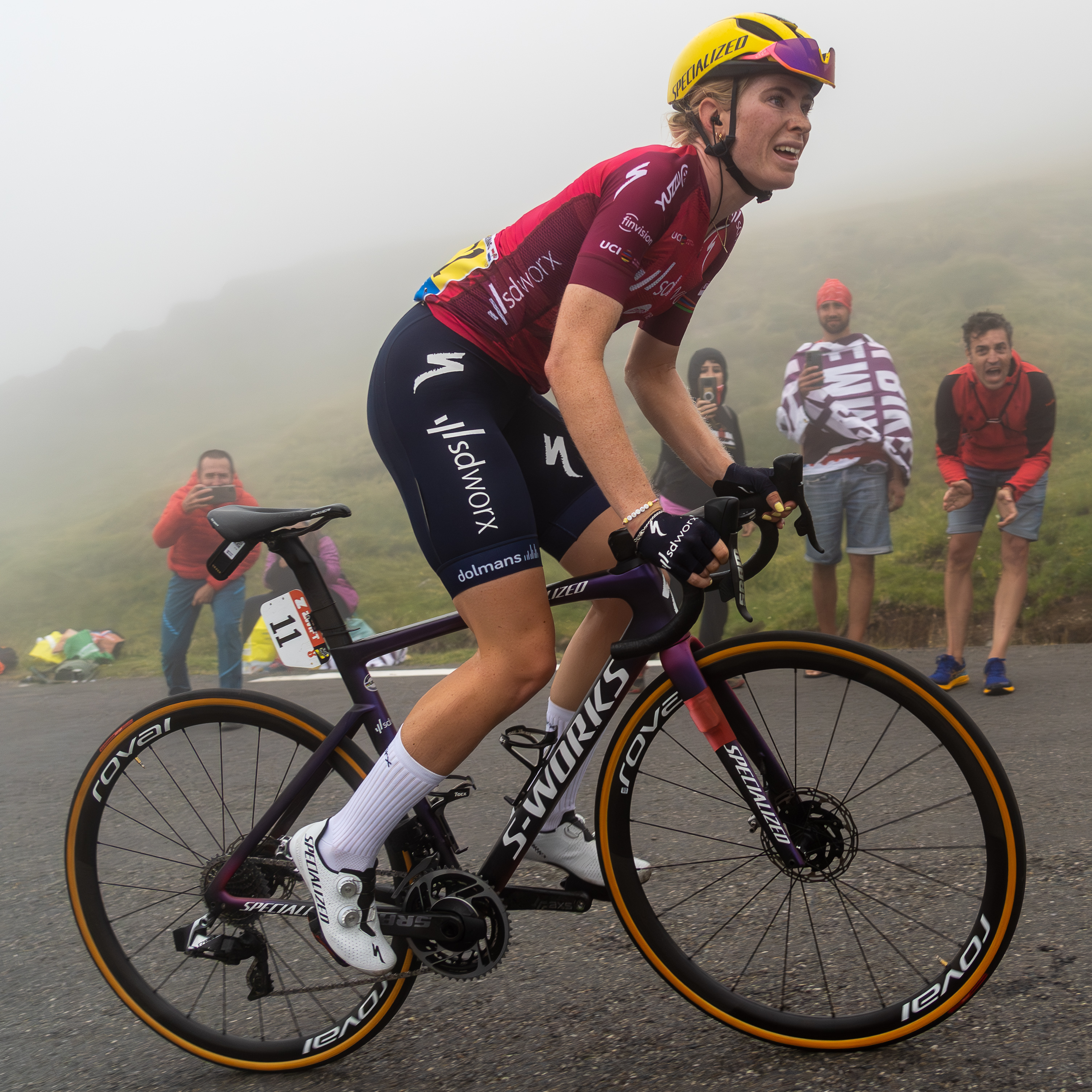
Demi Vollering (SD Worx) on the ascent of the Col du Tourmalet on stage 7

The seventh stage of the race was the queen stage of the race, a 89.9 km (55.9 mi) stage in the Pyrenees from Lannemezan to a summit finish at the Col du Tourmalet. The riders tackled two climbs - starting with the first category Col d'Aspin (12km with an average gradient of 6.5%) before ascending the hors catégorie Col du Tourmalet (17.1km with an average gradient of 7.5%), with an elevation of 2,115 m (6,939 ft). The climbs were last tackled by the peloton at the 2007 Grande Boucle, with a summit finish last occurring in the 2000 edition of the race.

Prior to the start of the stage, Lidl–Trek riders Elisa Longo Borghini (who was 4th on GC, 55" behind Kopecky) and Elisa Balsamo withdrew due to a skin infection and fatigue respectively.

Early on in the stage, Vos abandoned the race, in light of the Road World Championships in early August. After initial skirmishes prior to the Col d'Aspin, the peloton hit the first climb with GC contenders immediately powering away from the rest of the field, leaving Kastelijn in the polka dot jersey behind. 5 kilometres (3.1 mi) from the top, Van Vleuten launched an attack, followed by her rival Vollering as well as Niewiadoma. Niewiadoma took the QoM points at the top of the climb. Over the top of the climb, Kopecky limited her time loss to the leading trio to under a minute. On the descent, Niewiadoma was substantially faster than both Vollering and Van Vleuten. The two rivals did not wish to work together to chase Niewiadoma. Instead, they decided to wait for teammates behind, allowing Niewiadoma's lead to balloon to nearly 45 seconds.

On the ascent of the Col du Tourmalet, the yellow jersey group including Labous, Moolman Pasio, Reusser, Kopecky, Vollering and Van Vleuten worked to reduce the gap to Niewiadoma to just 6 seconds. But Niewiadoma kept working, eventually extending her lead over the yellow jersey group to 30 seconds with 10 km (6.2 mi) to go.

In thick fog, Vollering attacked with 5 kilometres (3.1 mi) to the summit, with Van Vleuten unable to follow. Passing Niewiadoma a few kilometres later, Vollering soloed to the top of the climb, winning the stage by 1' 58" ahead of Niewiadoma. Van Vleuten finished the stage 2' 34" behind Vollering in third, with the yellow jersey of Kopecky finishing 6th on the stage, 3' 32" behind Vollering. The tough stage caused large time gaps, with only 18 riders finishing within 10 minutes of Vollering. Two riders finishing outside the time limit, including sprinter Charlotte Kool.

Vollering therefore took the yellow jersey of the general classification, with a lead of 1' 50" ahead of Niewiadoma. Van Vleuten took 3rd on GC, 2' 28" behind Vollering. Kopecky fell to 4th overall, just seven seconds behind Van Vleuten and four seconds ahead of Moolman Pasio in 5th place. Niewiadoma took the polka dot jersey of the mountains classification, with a 4 point lead over Kastelijn. Kopecky retained her green jersey of the points classification. Kerbaol retained the young rider classification, despite losing 44 seconds to her rival Wyllie.

Stage 7 Result
| Rank | Rider | Team | Time |
|---|---|---|---|
| 1 | Demi Vollering (NED) | SD Worx | 2h 52' 43" |
| 2 | Katarzyna Niewiadoma (POL) | Canyon//SRAM | + 1' 58" |
| 3 | Annemiek van Vleuten (NED) | Movistar Team | + 2' 34" |
| 4 | Ashleigh Moolman Pasio (RSA) | AG Insurance–Soudal–Quick-Step | + 2' 43" |
| 5 | Juliette Labous (FRA) | Team dsm–firmenich | + 2' 46" |
| 6 | Lotte Kopecky (BEL) | SD Worx | + 3' 32" |
| 7 | Ane Santesteban (ESP) | Team Jayco–AlUla | + 5' 24" |
| 8 | Marta Cavalli (ITA) | FDJ–Suez | + 5' 43" |
| 9 | Cecilie Uttrup Ludwig (DEN) | FDJ–Suez | + 5' 46" |
| 10 | Ricarda Bauernfeind (GER) | Canyon//SRAM | + 6' 57" |

General classification after Stage 7
| Rank | Rider | Team | Time |
|---|---|---|---|
| 1 | Demi Vollering (NED) | SD Worx | 24h 48' 10" |
| 2 | Katarzyna Niewiadoma (POL) | Canyon//SRAM | + 1' 50" |
| 3 | Annemiek van Vleuten (NED) | Movistar Team | + 2' 28" |
| 4 | Lotte Kopecky (BEL) | SD Worx | + 2' 35" |
| 5 | Ashleigh Moolman Pasio (RSA) | AG Insurance–Soudal–Quick-Step | + 2' 39" |
| 6 | Juliette Labous (FRA) | Team dsm–firmenich | + 3' 41" |
| 7 | Ane Santesteban (ESP) | Team Jayco–AlUla | + 6' 23" |
| 8 | Cecilie Uttrup Ludwig (DEN) | FDJ–Suez | + 6' 42" |
| 9 | Ricarda Bauernfeind (GER) | Canyon//SRAM | + 7' 42" |
| 10 | Amanda Spratt (AUS) | Lidl–Trek | + 8' 18" |

== Stage 8 ==
30 July 2023 – Pau, 22.6 km (14.0 mi)

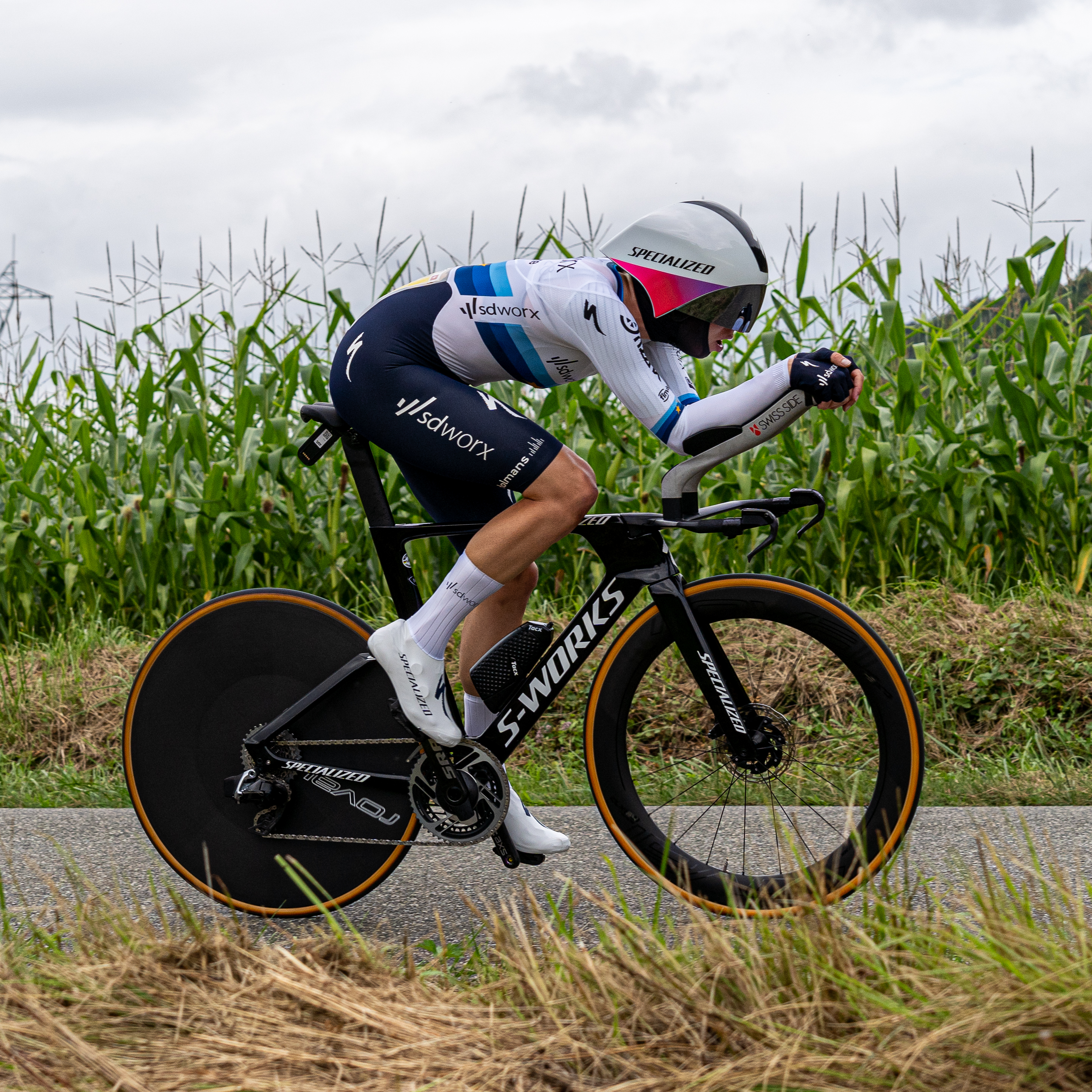
Marlen Reusser (SD Worx) riding the stage 8 time trial in Pau

The final stage of the race was an individual time trial over a twisting 22.6 km (14.0 mi) course in Pau. The course was similar to one previously used for a time trial at the 2019 Tour de France, as well as for the 2019 La Course by Le Tour de France stage race.

Prior to the start of the stage, Mavi Garcia (Liv Racing TeqFind) withdrew from 15th place overall due to illness. It was considered unlikely that Vollering would lose the yellow jersey on the stage, in light of her 1' 50" lead over Niewiadoma. However third placed Kopecky was just seven seconds behind Van Vleuten and four seconds ahead of Moolman-Pasio.

Vittoria Guazzini (FDJ–Suez) was the seventh rider to start, setting a fast time that was not beaten for over an hour. Her time was finally beaten by her teammate Grace Brown, who set a time 28" faster. Brown's time was then beaten by Reusser, two time silver medalist at the time trial world championships and silver medalist in the time trial at Tokyo 2020.

Kopecky then set a fast time, 38 seconds slower than Reusser, overtaking her two minute woman Moolman-Pasio in the last two kilometres. Van Vleuten was then 1' 41" slower than Reusser, finishing 14th on the stage. She fell off the overall podium into fourth place. Niewiadoma had a 38" lead over Van Vleuten, and a 45" lead over Kopecky. Her time trial was 1' 23" slower than Reusser, finishing 9th on the stage. Kopecky took second place overall by 21 hundredths of a second.

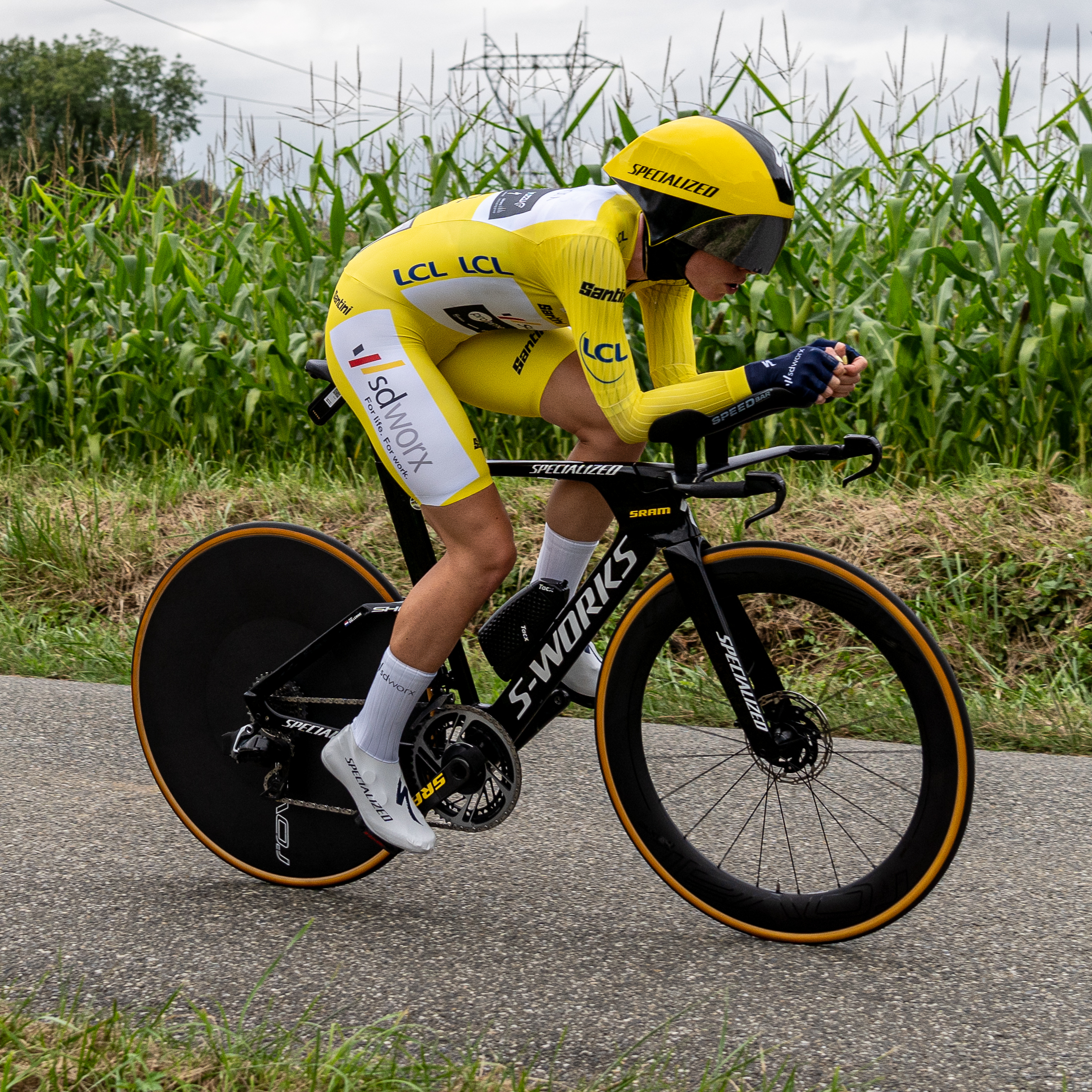
Demi Vollering wearing the yellow jersey on stage 8

The last rider to start was Vollering, who maintained a fast pace throughout the time trial to finish second on the stage, 10" behind Reusser - sealing her victory. Reusser's time of 29' 15" was therefore the fastest time on the stage. However her time did not elevate her substantially in the GC, rising two places to 28th overall.

In the final general classification (GC), Demi Vollering (SD Worx) won the Tour de France Femmes with an advantage over her teammate Lotte Kopecky of over three minutes. Finishing in third place for the second year in a row was Katarzyna Niewiadoma (Canyon//SRAM), who finished 21 hundredths of a second behind Kopecky. Vollering retained her lead in the UCI Women's World Tour standings.

In the race's other classifications, Kopecky won the points classification. Apart from finishing third in the GC, Niewiadoma also took the polka-dot jersey as winner of the Queen of the Mountains (QoM) classification. Cédrine Kerbaol of Ceratizit–WNT Pro Cycling took the white jersey as the winner of the young riders classification, which was awarded to the best-placed GC rider under the age of 23. SD Worx won the team classification as the team with the lowest aggregate time among their three best-placed riders. Yara Kastelijn took the super-combativity award to add to her win on stage 4. Out of 154 starters, 123 finished the event.

Vollering expressed her delight following her victory, stating that she "still can't believe it". She also expressed her hope that the Tour has "inspired many young girls and women". Her rival Van Vleuten was disappointed with her performance, and praised Vollering for her victory. She also explained that illness had dampened her performance in both the mountainous stage 7 and the final time trial. Niewiadoma was pleased with her polka dot jersey, while expressing disappointment about losing second place overall. Kopecky's strong performance was praised, with L'Équipe calling her "the Wout van Aert of women's cycling". Overall, SD Worx dominated the event, with 1st and 2nd place in the overall classification, 1st in the points and team classifications, as well as 4 stage wins.

Stage 8 Result
| Rank | Rider | Team | Time |
|---|---|---|---|
| 1 | Marlen Reusser (SUI) | SD Worx | 29' 15" |
| 2 | Demi Vollering (NED) | SD Worx | + 10" |
| 3 | Lotte Kopecky (BEL) | SD Worx | + 38" |
| 4 | Grace Brown (AUS) | FDJ–Suez | + 40" |
| 5 | Riejanne Markus (NED) | Team Jumbo–Visma | + 50" |
| 6 | Juliette Labous (FRA) | Team dsm–firmenich | + 1' 17" |
| 7 | Olivia Baril (CAN) | UAE Team ADQ | + 1' 18" |
| 8 | Vittoria Guazzini (ITA) | FDJ–Suez | + 1' 21" |
| 9 | Katarzyna Niewiadoma (POL) | Canyon//SRAM | + 1' 23" |
| 10 | Lucinda Brand (NED) | Lidl–Trek | + 1' 30" |

General classification after Stage 8
| Rank | Rider | Team | Time |
|---|---|---|---|
| 1 | Demi Vollering (NED) | SD Worx | 25h 17' 35" |
| 2 | Lotte Kopecky (BEL) | SD Worx | + 3' 03" |
| 3 | Katarzyna Niewiadoma (POL) | Canyon//SRAM | + 3' 03" |
| 4 | Annemiek van Vleuten (NED) | Movistar Team | + 3' 59" |
| 5 | Juliette Labous (FRA) | Team dsm–firmenich | + 4' 48" |
| 6 | Ashleigh Moolman (RSA) | AG Insurance–Soudal–Quick-Step | + 5' 21" |
| 7 | Cecilie Uttrup Ludwig (DEN) | FDJ–Suez | + 9' 09" |
| 8 | Ane Santesteban (ESP) | Team Jayco–AlUla | + 9' 36" |
| 9 | Ricarda Bauernfeind (GER) | Canyon//SRAM | + 9' 56" |
| 10 | Amanda Spratt (AUS) | Lidl–Trek | + 10' 14" |
