= Collonges-la-Rouge =

- Commune
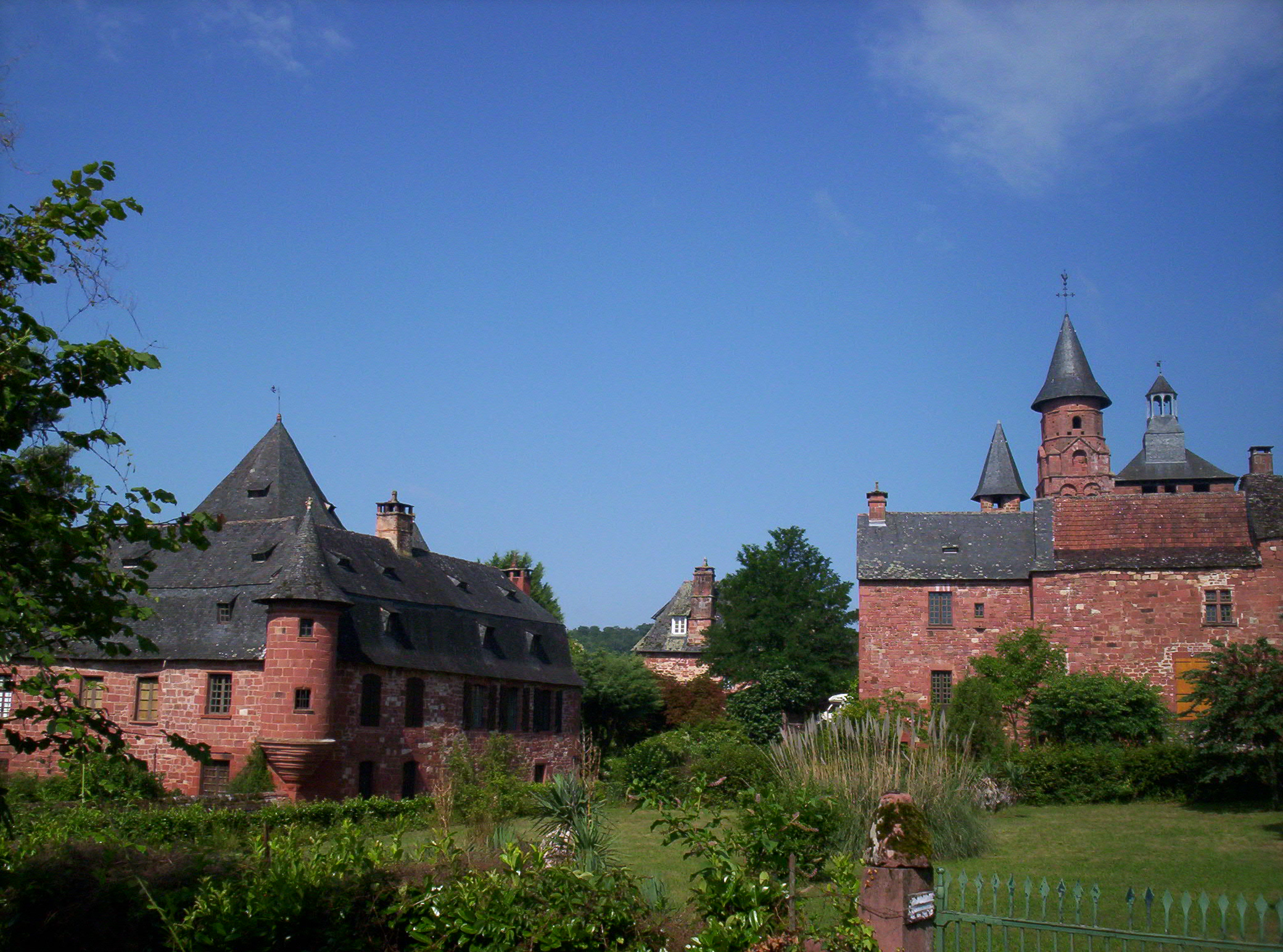
- Collonges-la-Rouge

- Coat of arms
- Location of Collonges-la-Rouge
- Location within France Location within Nouvelle-Aquitaine
- Coordinates: 45°03′40″N 1°39′18″E
- Country: France
- Region: Nouvelle-Aquitaine
- Department: Corrèze
- Arrondissement: Brive-la-Gaillarde
- Canton: Midi Corrézien

Government
  - Mayor (2020–2026): Michel Charlot
- Area^{1}: 14.31 km^{2} (5.53 sq mi)
- Elevation: 230 m (750 ft)
- Highest elevation: 493 m (1,617 ft)
- Lowest elevation: 144 m (472 ft)
- Population (2023): 478
  - Density: 33.4/km^{2} (86.5/sq mi)
- Time zone: UTC+01:00 (CET)
  - Summer (DST): UTC+02:00 (CEST)
- INSEE/Postal code: 19057 /19500
- ^{1} French Land Register data, which excludes lakes, ponds, glaciers > 1 km^{2} (0.386 sq mi or 247 acres) and river estuaries.

Collonges-la-Rouge (French pronunciation: [kɔlɔ̃ʒ la ʁuʒ], literally Collonges the Red; Occitan: Colonjas lo Ròse) is a commune in the Corrèze department in the Nouvelle-Aquitaine region of France twenty kilometres south-east of Brive-la-Gaillarde, on the edge of the Limousin plateaus to the north and facing the Quercy, four kilometres to the south. Known for its medieval red sandstone buildings.

== Toponymy ==
The town's current name is a variation of a Roman Gaulish name of Colonicas, possibly a Roman colony.

It has a nickname, the "town of twenty-five towers".

== History ==
The monks of Charroux Abbey founded a priory in the 8th century which attracted a population of peasants, craftsmen and tradesmen who lived and prospered around its fortified walls. The town was on the pilgrim road, the Camino de Santiago, from Vézelay to Santiago de Compostela via Rocamadour. In 1308, the viscount of Turenne granted the village a right to high, medium and low jurisdiction, permitting it to govern the birth of lineages of prosecutors, lawyers and notaries. The enclosure soon became too small to contain the entire population, and faubourgs were created. Following the French wars of religion, the reconstruction of the nobility's fortune coincided with the viscount's rise in power.

After the Viscounty of Turenne was sold in 1738, to pay debts, the town came under the rule of the French king. After the French Revolution which caused the destruction of the priory buildings, the village regained a short-lasting prosperity at the beginning of the 19th century. Later on, its population slowly decreased and the village was transformed into a stone quarry.

At the beginning of the 20th century, some villagers created the association Les Amis de Collonges (The Friends of Collonges) and eventually obtained the classification of the entire village as a historical monument in 1942.

== Geography ==
=== Geology ===
The red sandstone is result of iron oxide. Millions of years ago, the red sandstone of the Massif Central slid under the Aquitaine limestone plate resulting in the Meyssac fault.

== Population ==
Historical population
Year	Pop.	±% p.a.
1968	375	—
1975	360	−0.58%
1982	379	+0.74%
1990	381	+0.07%
1999	413	+0.90%
2007	455	+1.22%
2012	480	+1.08%
2017	486	+0.25%
2023	478	−0.28%
Source: INSEE

Its inhabitants are called Collongeois in French.

== Sights ==
The Halle Henri IV is a grain and wine market hall dating from the late sixteenth or early seventeenth century. It still houses the communal oven that was still in use in 1968 (it is now only relit on the first Sunday of August, for the annual bread festival). The covered market hall is listed as a historical monument.

=== Houses ===
- Maison de la Sirène, possesses a vaulted porch and dates to the 16th century. It belonged to Henry de Jouvenel, one of writer Colette's husbands. It is listed as a historical monument. A 3 franc postage stamp representing the Maison de la Sirène was issued on 3 July 1982
- A priory, built in the 16th century, has been a historical monument since 4 July 1951 for its facade with balcony and its roof;
- the ancient sisters' house (Ancienne maison des Soeurs), built in the 16th century, has been a historical monument since 4 July 1951;

Rue de la Barrière (Barrière Street)

- 16th-century Maison Bonyt is a historical monument for its facade, roof and spiral staircase;
- Maison Boutang du Peyrat, with parts from the 15th, 16th and 17th centuries, is a historical monument. The protected elements are a window with preserved Louis XIII woodwork, a 17th-century entrance door, a wooden chimney, its facade and roof;
- 16th-century Maison Julliotis a historical monument for its facade, roof and entrance stairs;
- Maison Dey is a historical monument;
- A 16th and 18th-century house on the Place de la Halle is a historical monument for its facade, loggia, and roof;
- Maison Poignet has a 17th-century window listed as a historical monument;
- Maison Salvant et Vallat is also a historical monument.

=== Official buildings ===
- The Ancien tribunal de la Chatellerie (ancient court of the Châtellerie) (16th century) has been a historical monument since 13 December 1978
- The ancient town hall (with parts from the 16th, 17th and 18th centuries) has its facade, roof, and stone chimney listed as national monuments since 4 January 1951

=== Castles, hotels and noble houses ===
- Manoir de Vassinhac (14th and 16th centuries), with elements of fortifications, is a historical monument. For residence of the Vassinhac family, who during the 1500s and 1600s, were governors of the Viscounty of Turenne;
- Château or Hôtel du Friac or de Beaurival (Hôtel de Beaurival), 15th century, is a historical monument since 17 December 1926;
- Château de Benge, with parts from the 16th and 18th centuries, was listed as a historical monument by the orders of 23 September 1953 and 18 March 1954;
- Castel Maussac, 15th and 16th centuries, has been a historical monument since 17 December 1926;
- Château du Breuil;
- Château du Martret, with parts from the 16th and 19th centuries, is a historical monument;
- Manoir dit de Beauvirie, 16th century, is a historical monument;
- Château de Beauregard, 15th century, has been a historical monument since 17 December 1926.

=== Military architecture ===
The fortified wall dates back to the 14th century. The doors of the ancient priory and of the church are both listed as historical monuments.

=== Religious architecture ===
==== Église Saint-Pierre de Collonges-la-Rouge ====
The church of St Peter, dating from the 11th, 12th and 15th centuries, with its Romanesque curved steeple (one of the oldest of the Nouvelle-Aquitaine region), was fortified both in the XIVth century and during the 16th-century French wars of religion. The west entrance has a 12th-century tympanum carved in white stone (contrasting with the red stone of the rest of the village). The upper part represents the ascension of Christ, flanked by four angels. In the lower register are twelve statues: St Peter, the Virgin (replacing Judas) and the other ten apostles. It was dismantled and hidden during the wars of religion and not reconstructed and replaced until 1923.

The main altar, painted in blue and gold, is composed of a 19th-century altar, a partly 17th-century gradin, an 18th-century tabernacle, and a retable reconstructed in the 19th century with elements two centuries older. It was listed as a national treasure and restored in 1984-1985.

The altar (wooden and painted in gold) of the southern chapel represents the Passion and dates back to the end of the 17th century. It is also listed as a historical monument.

The wooden altar rail of the chapel, with a central gate, dating back around the turn of the 18th century, is decorated with coquilles, volutes and sculpted acanthus leaves. It is listed.

The 16th-century wooden statue of Christ was discovered in 1971. It is a historical monument, with two other statues of the Virgin Mary, from the 17th or 18th century. A wooden Christ on the cross dates back to the 17th century, and is listed. The whole church has been a historical monument since 4 April 1905.

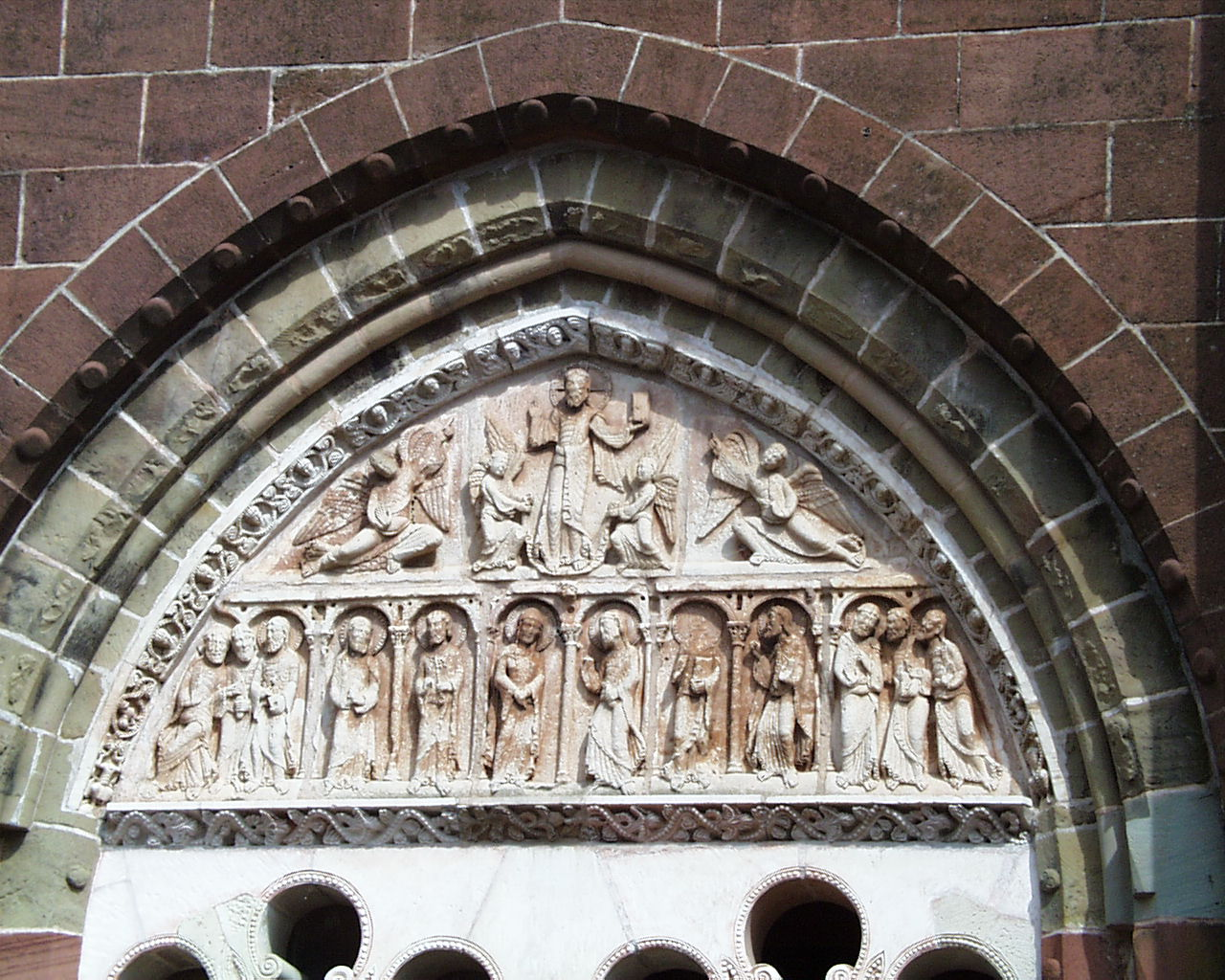
Tympanum of the church's gate

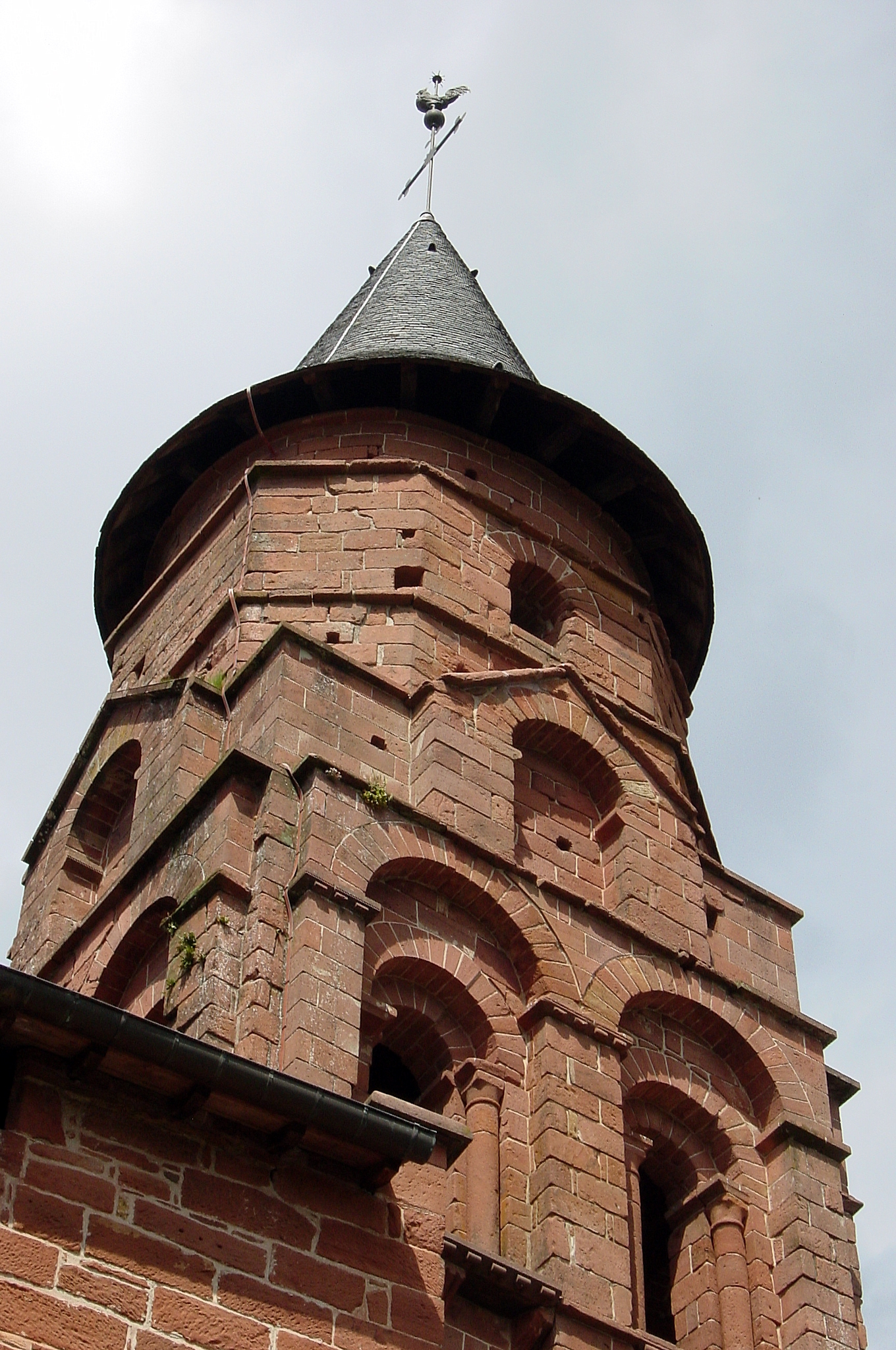
Saint-Pierre church's steeple

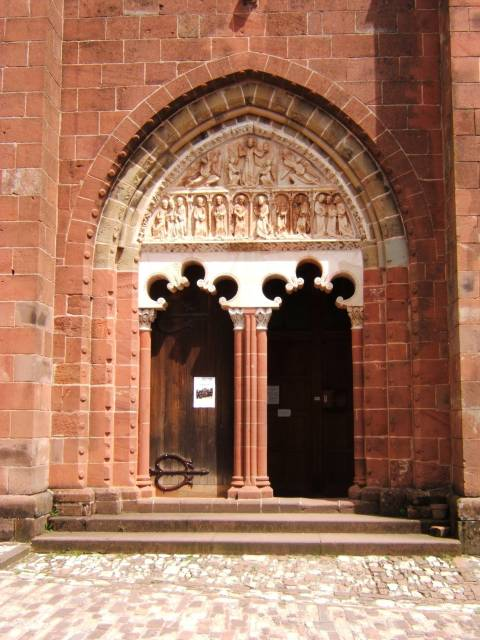
Saint-Pierre church's gate

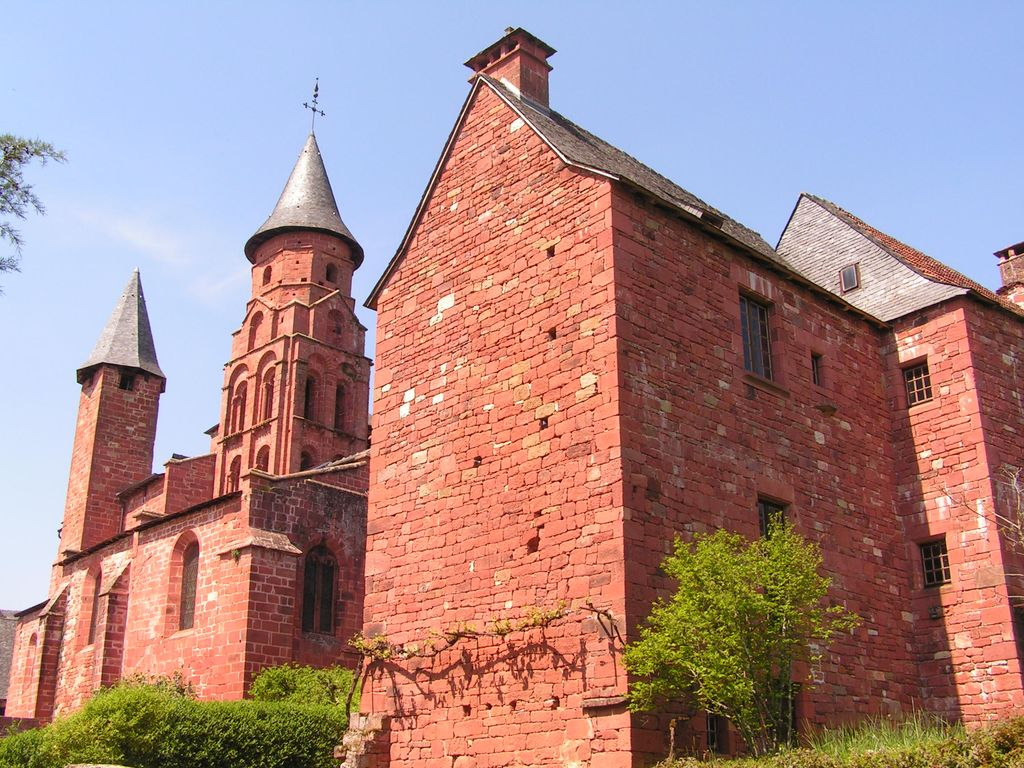
The back of the church

==== La Chapelle des Pénitents Noirs ====
The Chapel of the Black Penitents dates from the 14th century and belonged to the priory of Collonges. From the beginning, it was used for the burial of certain local notable families, notably the Maussacs, whose coat of arms can be seen above a walled door and on a keystone of the chapel. From the middle of the seventeenth century until the end of the nineteenth century, it was then called th Chapel of the Black Penitents. After the disappearance of the brotherhood, the chapel fell into disrepair. The Société des Amis de Collonges undertook restoration work from 1927 onwards.

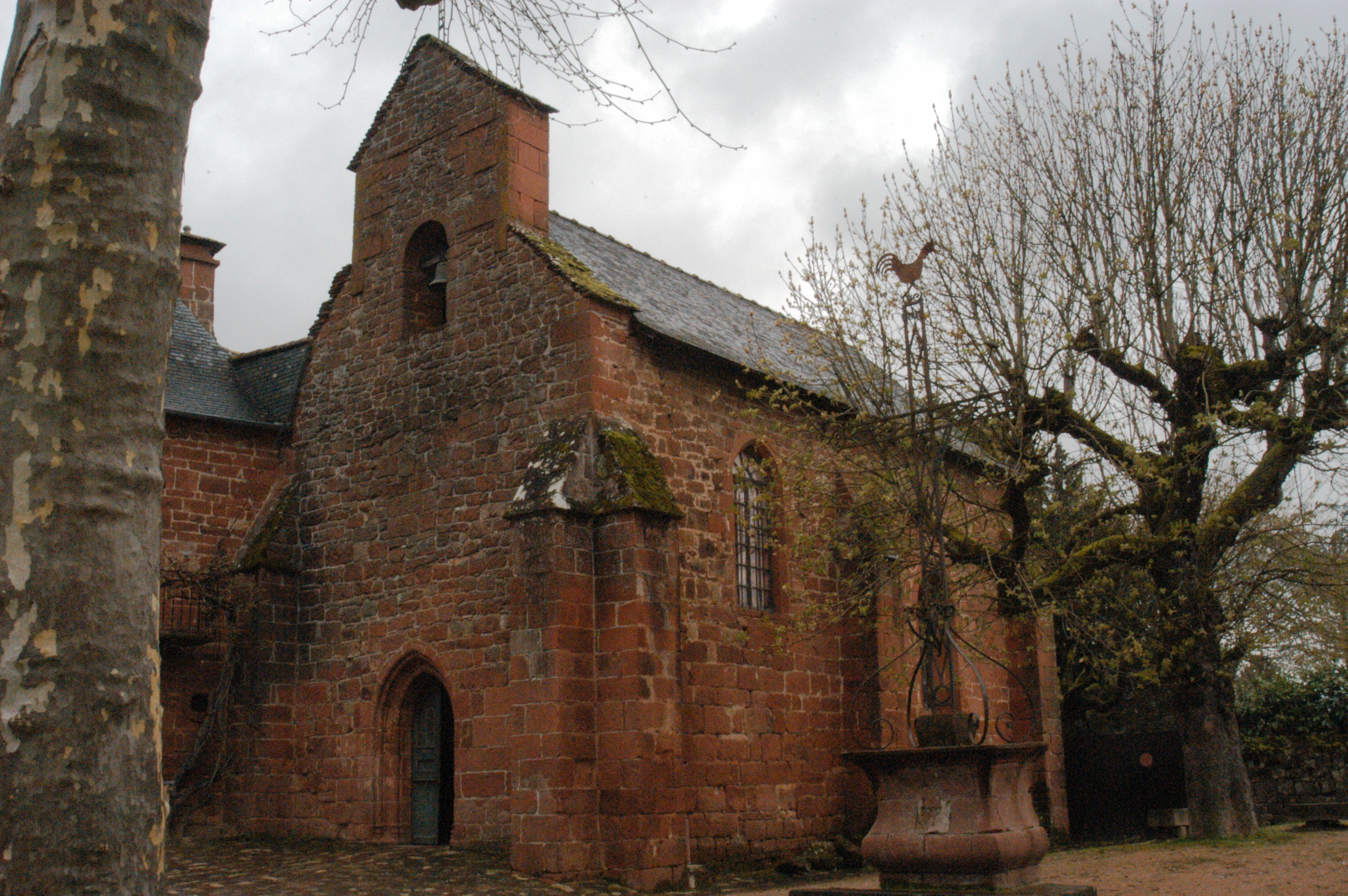
La chapelle des Pénitents noirs and la Croix de la Passion.

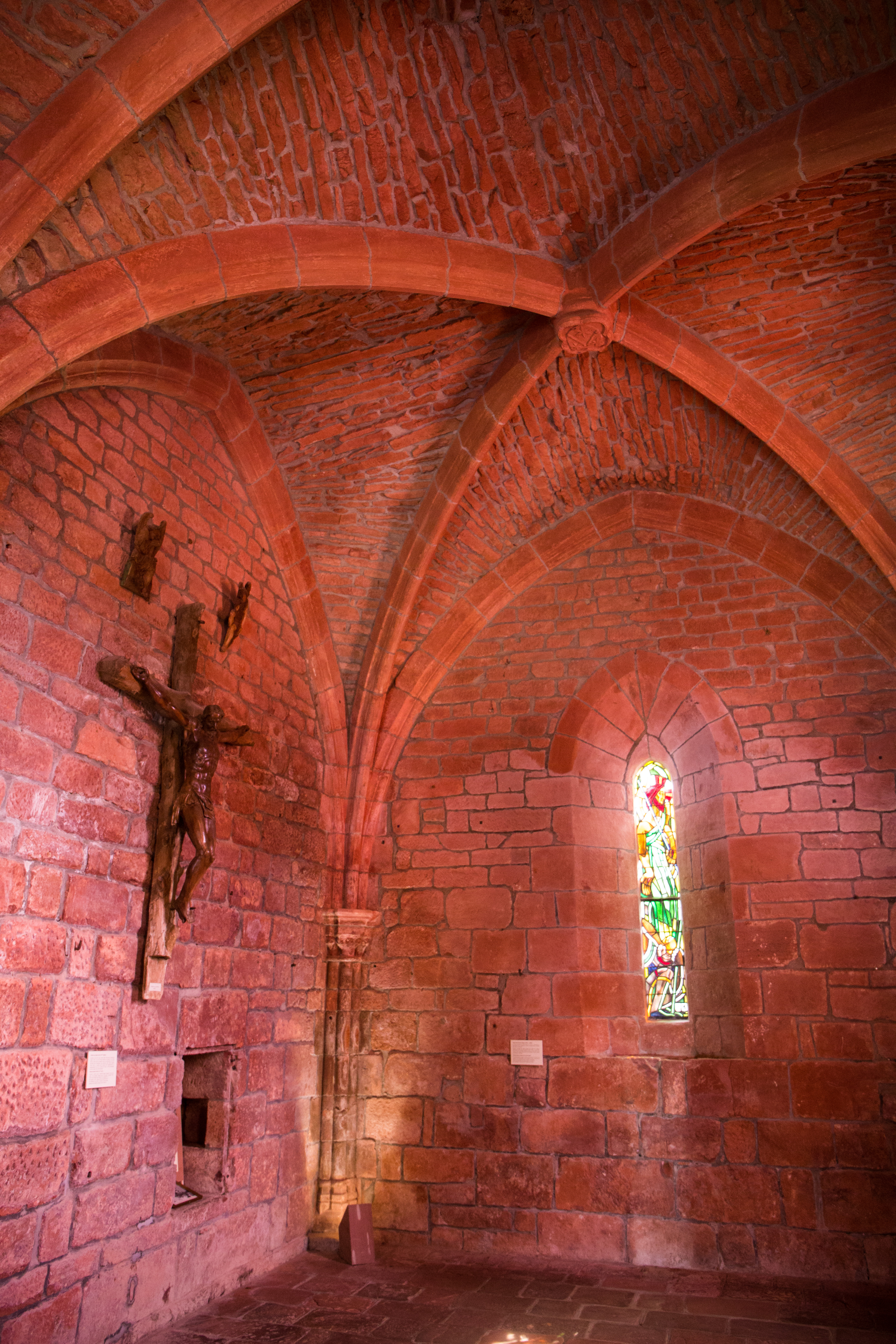
Chapelle des Pénitents.

== Gallery ==
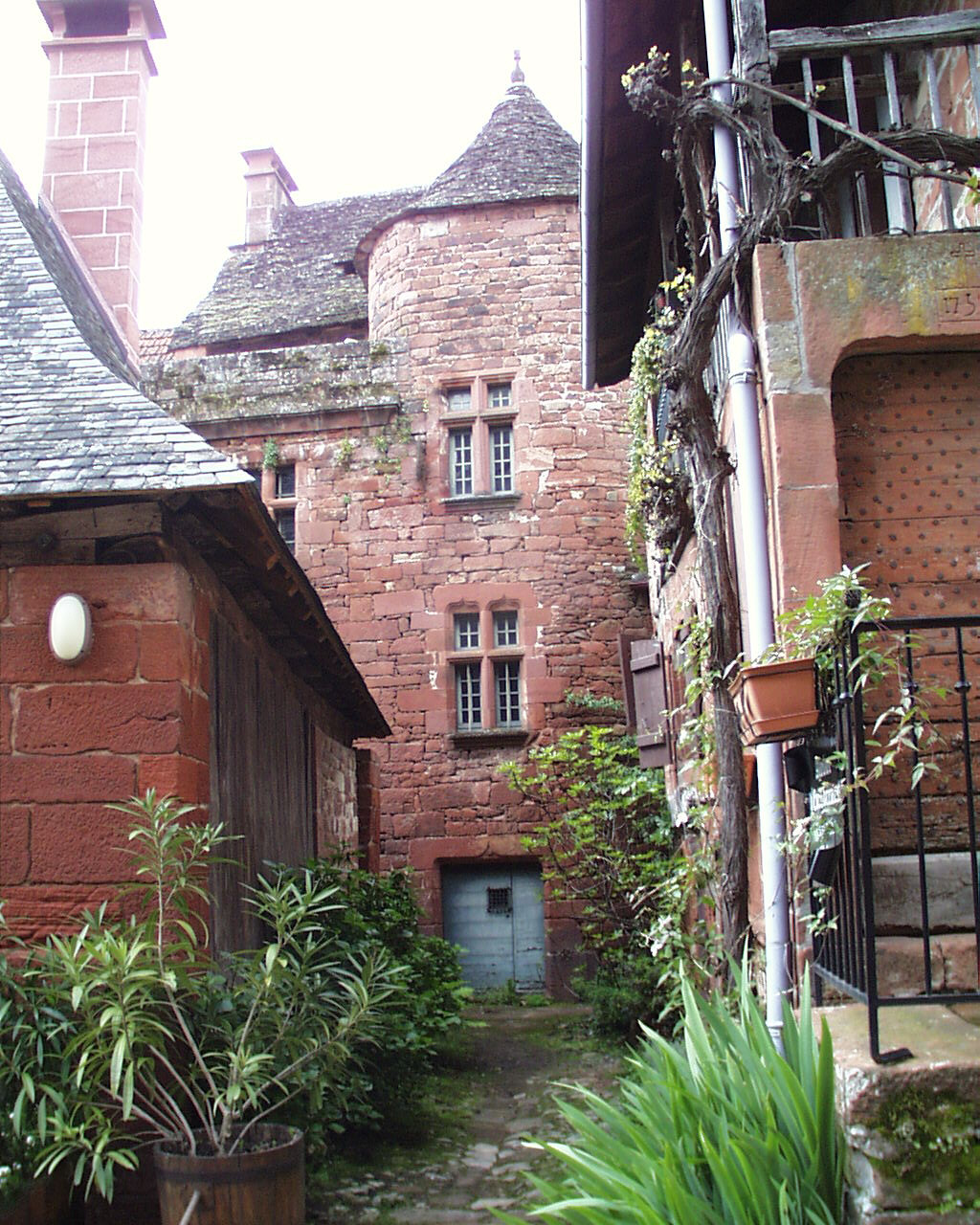
A street of Collonges-la-Rouge

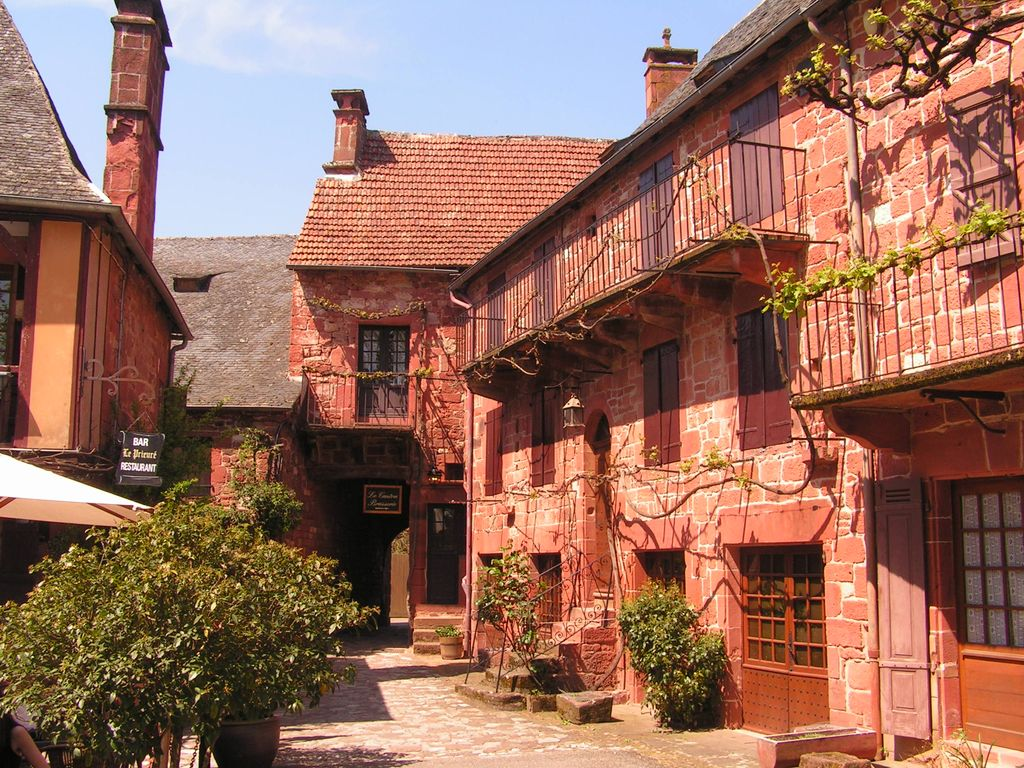
A street of Collonges-la-Rouge

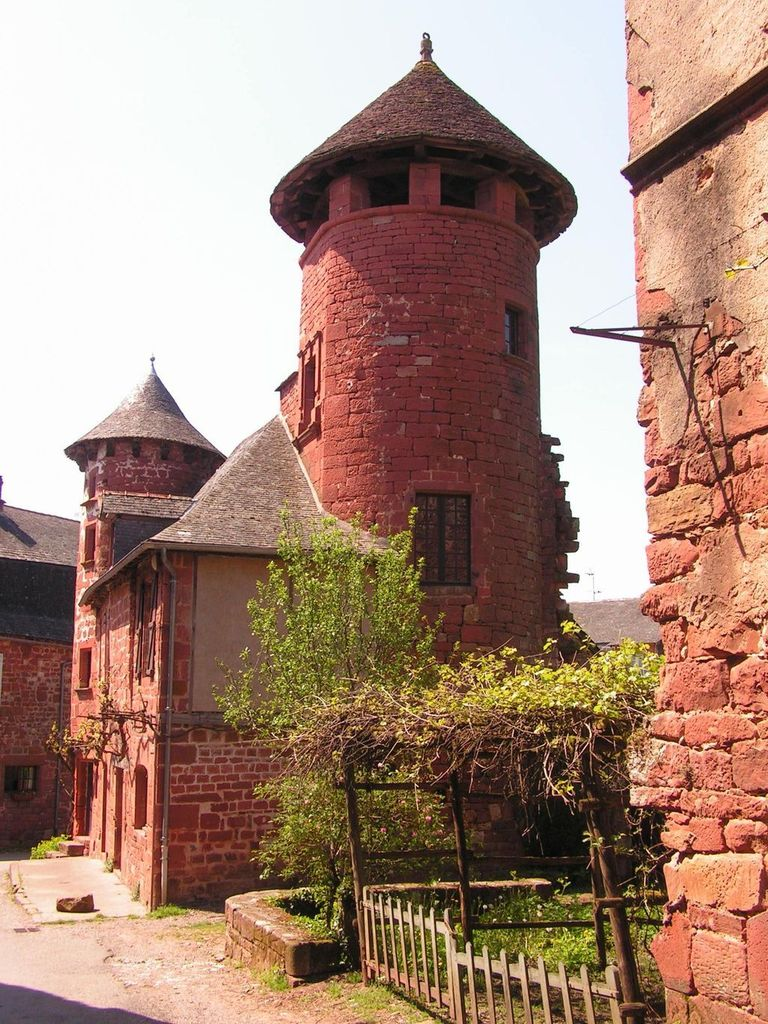
Towers

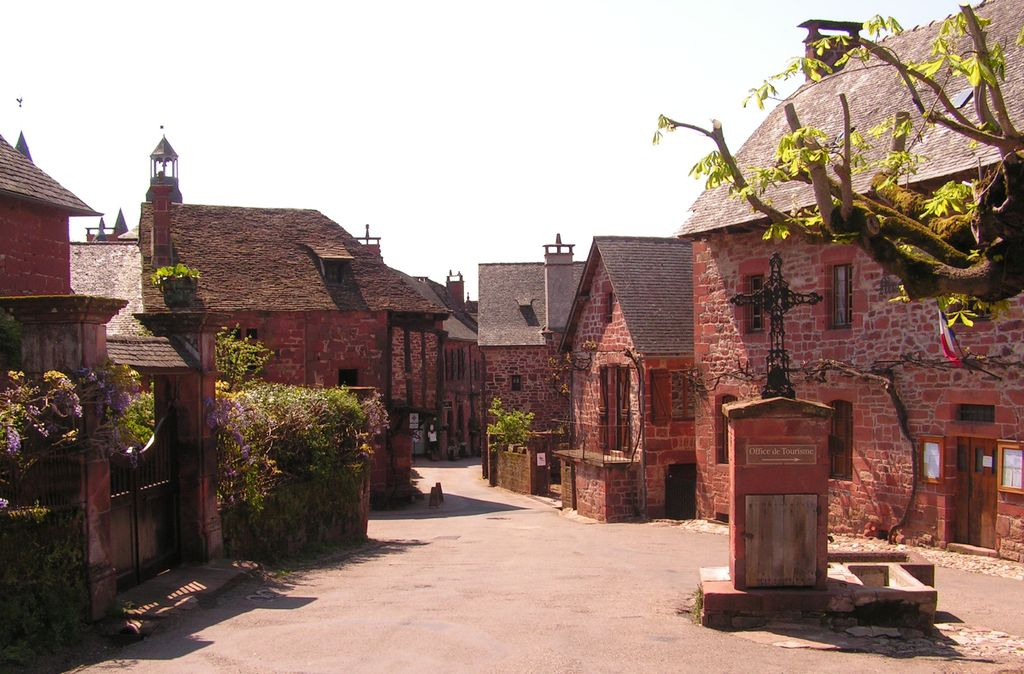
Place de Collonges-la-Rouge

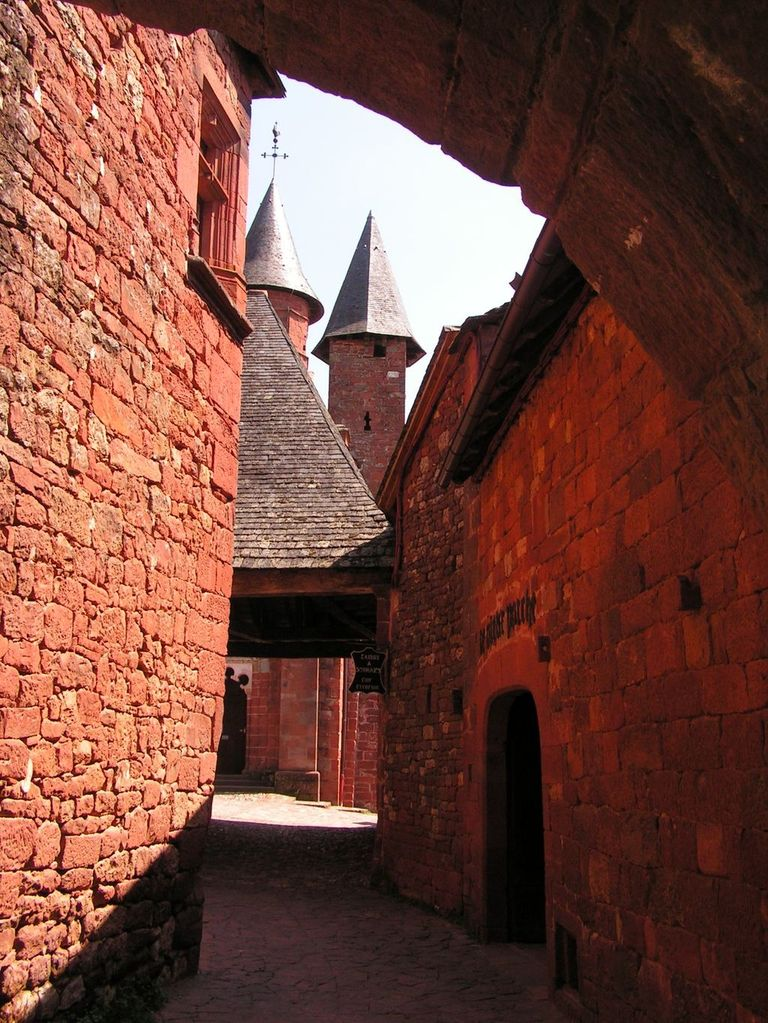
Church as seen under a porch

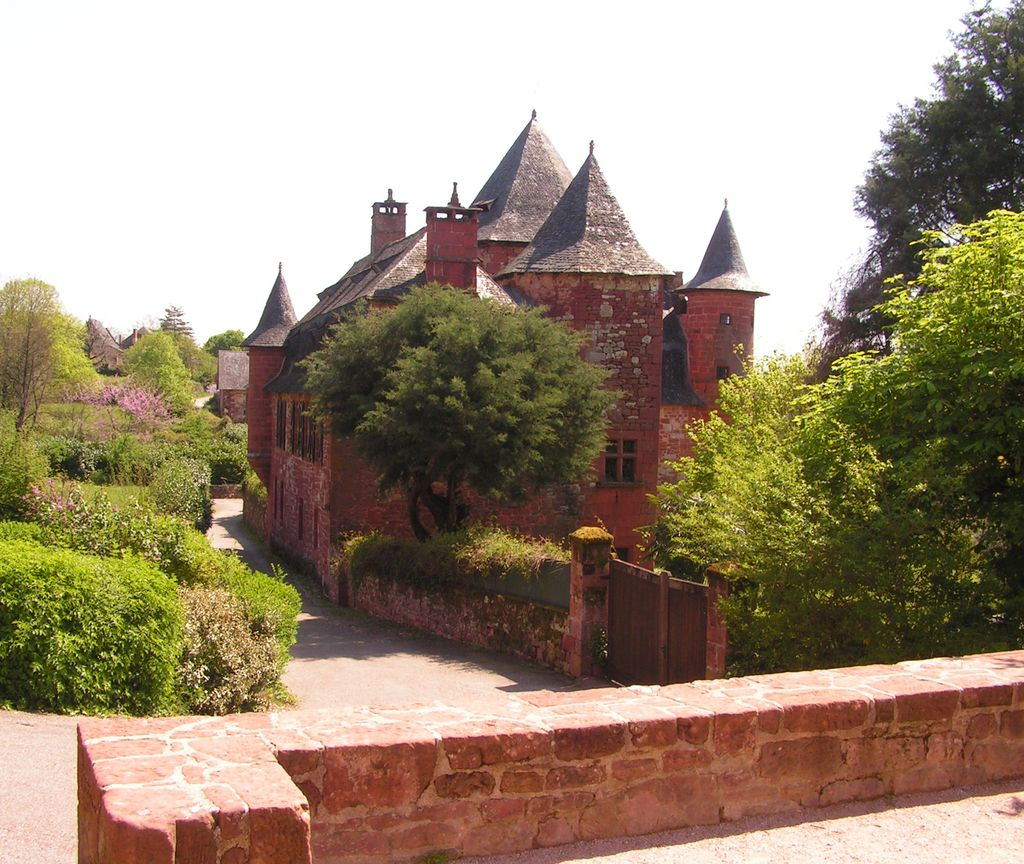
Castel de Vassinhac

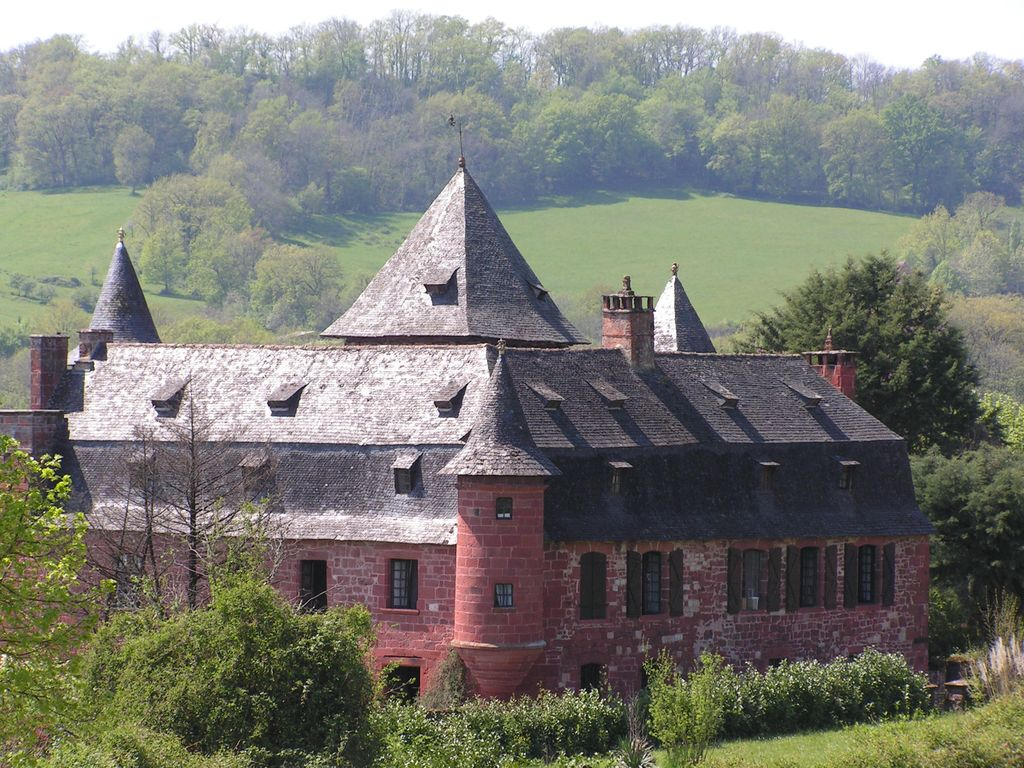
Castel de Vassinhac

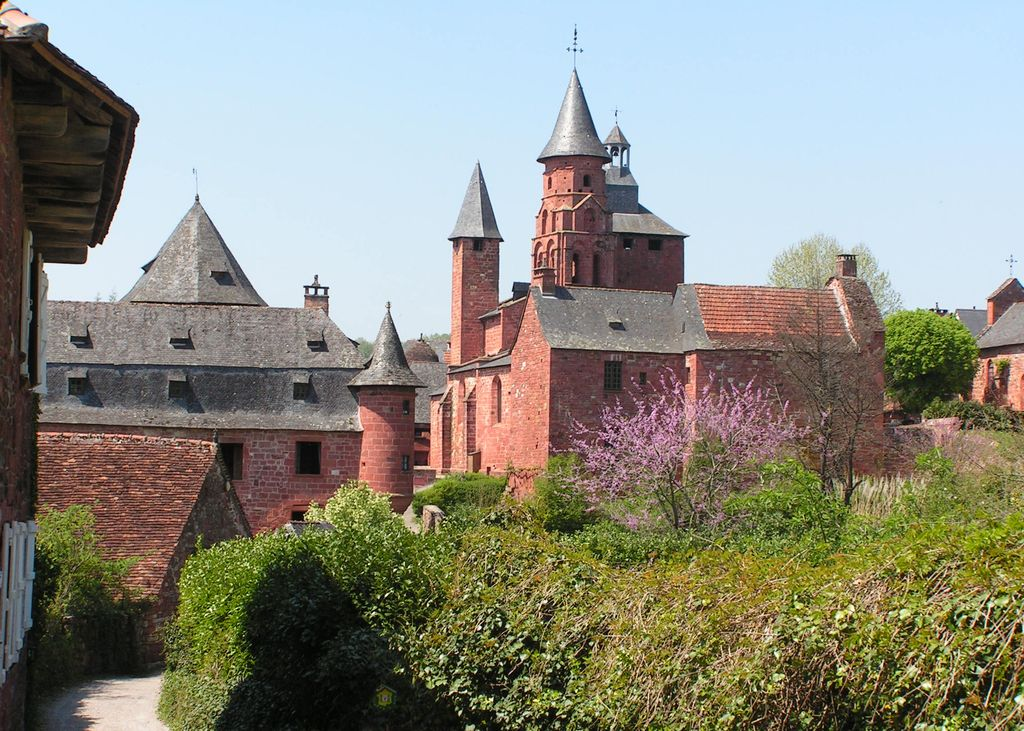
Castel de Vassinhac and church

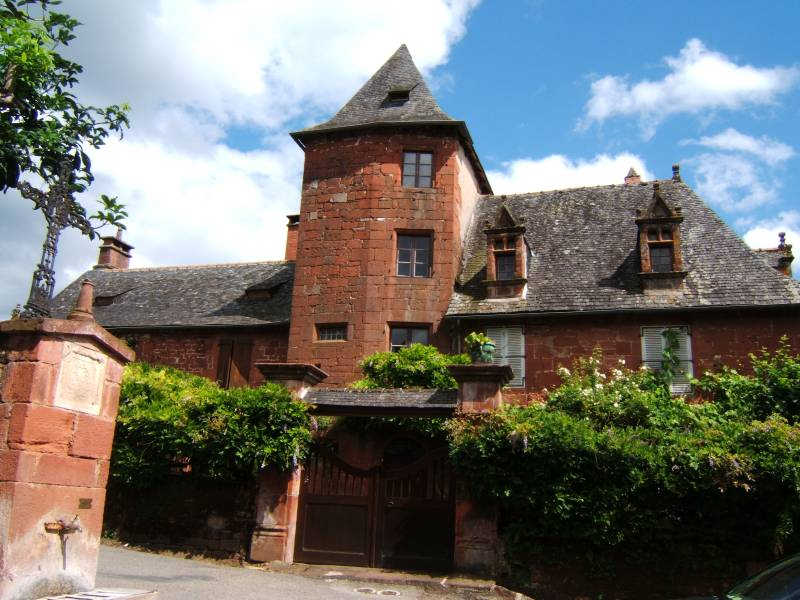
Maison de la Sirène

== See also ==
- Communes of the Corrèze department
