= Yara Kastelijn =

Dutch cyclist (born 1997)

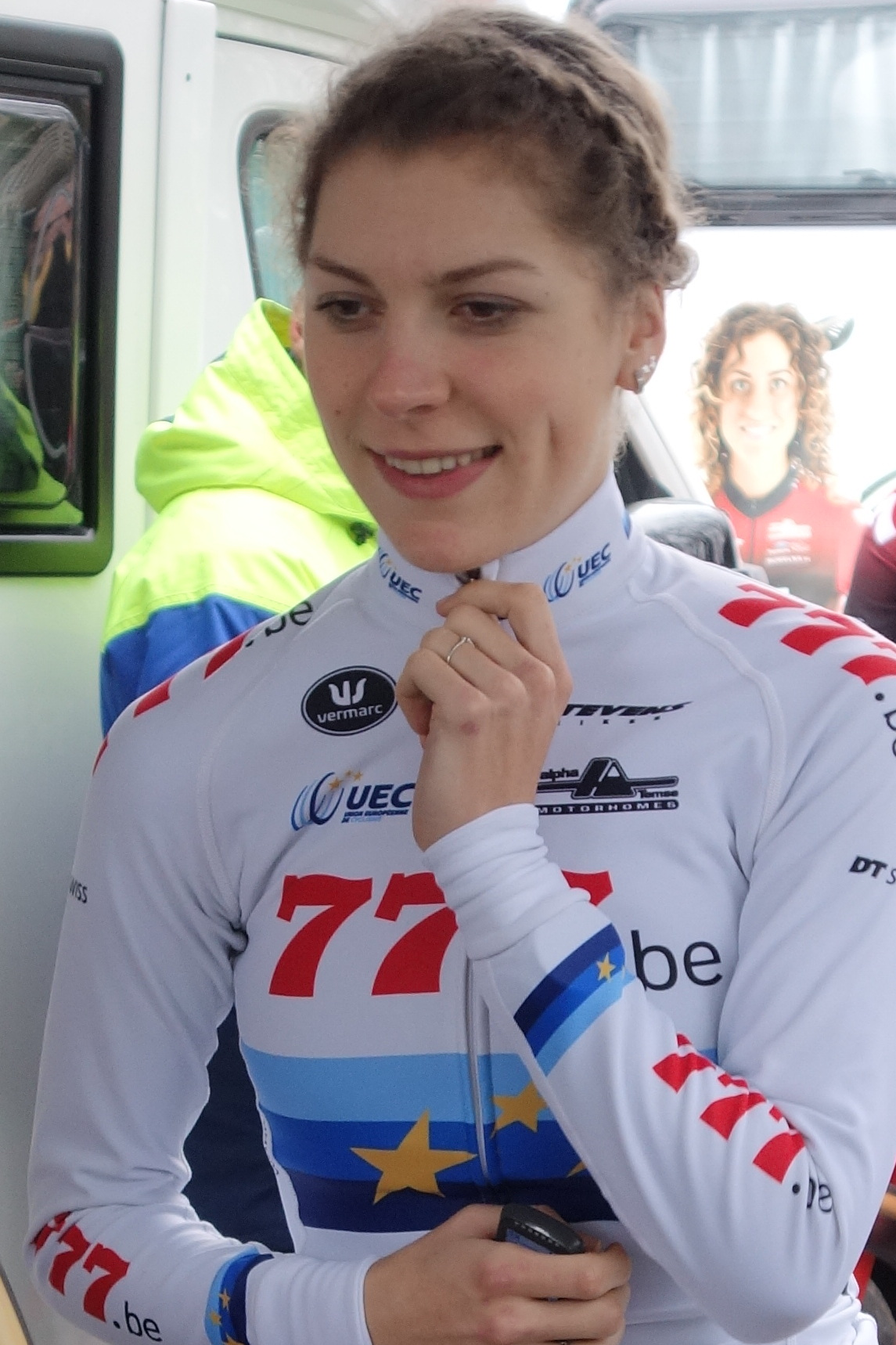
- Kastelijn in 2020.

Personal information
- Full name: Yara Kastelijn
- Born: 9 August 1997 (age 29) Deurne, Netherlands
- Height: 1.64 m (5 ft 5 in)
- Weight: 52 kg (115 lb)

Cycling career
- Sport: Cycling
- Current team: Credishop–Fristads (cyclo-cross); Fenix–Premier Tech (road)
- Disciplines: Road; Cyclo-cross
- Role: Rider

Amateur teams
- 2015: De Jonge Renner
- 2015: Guerciotti Selle Italia

Professional teams
- 2016–2018: Rabobank-Liv Woman Cycling Team
- 2018–2020: Steylaerts–777
- 2020–: Ciclismo Mundial (road)
- 2020–: Creafin–Fristads (cyclo-cross)

Major wins
- Cyclo-cross European Championships (2019) Road Major Tours Tour de France 1 individual stage (2023)
Medal record
Women's cyclo-cross
Representing Netherlands
European Championships
Gold medal – first place	2019 Silvelle	Elite
Bronze medal – third place	2021 Wijster	Elite

Yara Kastelijn (born 9 August 1997) is a Dutch racing cyclist, who currently competes in cyclo-cross for UCI Cyclo-cross Team Credishop–Fristads, and in road cycling for UCI Women's WorldTeam Fenix–Premier Tech.

In 2019, she won the elite race at the European Cyclo-cross Championships. In 2023, Kastelijn won stage 4 at the Tour de France Femmes, as well as holding the polka dot jersey of the mountains classification for 3 stages.

== Major results ==
=== Cyclo-cross ===
2013–2014
2nd Surhuisterveen
2nd Milan
2016–2017
2nd Surhuisterveen
2017–2018
3rd National Under-23 Championships
2018–2019
Toi Toi Cup

1st Mlada Boleslav

1st Pfaffnau
2nd Pétange
2nd La Meziere
2019–2020
1st UEC European Championships
Superprestige

1st Gavere
3rd Gieten
3rd Zonhoven
3rd Diegem

3rd Overall DVV Trophy

1st Koppenberg
3rd Ronse

1st Wachtebeke
Ethias Cross

2nd Kruibeke

Rectavit Series

2nd Neerpelt

2nd Gullegem
UCI World Cup

3rd Tábor
3rd Koksijde

2020–2021
Ethias Cross

2nd Kruibeke

X²O Badkamers Trophy

3rd Koppenberg
3rd Kortrijk

2021–2022
Ethias Cross

1st Beringen
2nd Bredene

3rd UEC European Championships
2022–2023
Exact Cross

3rd Essen

=== Gravel ===
2025
4th UCI World Championships

=== Road ===
2015
1st Time trial, National Junior Championships
3rd Time trial, UEC European Junior Championships
8th Road race, UCI World Junior Championships
2016
1st Stage 2a (TTT) Giro del Trentino Alto Adige-Südtirol
2017
8th 7-Dorpenomloop Aalburg
2018
7th Road race, UEC European Under-23 Championships
2021
10th Overall Tour of Norway
2022
7th Overall Tour de Romandie
9th La Flèche Wallonne
2023
Tour de France

1st Stage 4
Held after Stages 2 & 5–6
Combativity award Stage 4 & Overall

2024
8th Overall La Vuelta Femenina
2025
8th Tre Valli Varesine
10th Liège–Bastogne–Liège
2026
1st Overall Vuelta a Burgos Feminas

1st Mountains classification
1st Stage 4

2nd Overall Itzulia Women

1st Mountains classification

10th Overall Tour de Suisse

== See also ==
- List of 2016 UCI Women's Teams and riders
