= 2024 La Vuelta Femenina, Stage 1 to Stage 8 =

Cycling race stages

The 2024 La Vuelta Femenina (officially La Vuelta Femenina by Carrefour.es) was the second edition of La Vuelta Femenina, a cycling stage race which takes place in Spain. The race took place from 28 April to 5 May 2024, and was the 15th event in the 2024 UCI Women's World Tour.

== Overview ==
Stage characteristics
Stage	Date	Course	Distance	Type	Winner
1	28 April	Valencia	16 km (9.9 mi)	Team time trial	(United States) Lidl–Trek
2	29 April	Buñol to Moncofa	118 km (73 mi)	Hilly stage	Alison Jackson (CAN)
3	30 April	Lucena to Teruel	131 km (81 mi)	Medium-mountain stage	Marianne Vos (NED)
4	1 May	Molina de Aragón to Zaragoza	142 km (88 mi)	Flat stage	Kristen Faulkner (USA)
5	2 May	Huesca to Jaca	113 km (70 mi)	Mountain stage	Demi Vollering (NED)
6	3 May	Tarazona to La Laguna Negra	132 km (82 mi)	Mountain stage	Évita Muzic (FRA)
7	4 May	San Esteban de Gormaz to Sigüenza	126 km (78 mi)	Hilly stage	Marianne Vos (NED)
8	5 May	Distrito Telefónica to Valdesquí	89 km (55 mi)	Mountain stage	Demi Vollering (NED)
Total			867 km (539 mi)		

== Classification standings ==
Legend
Denotes the leader of the general classification	Denotes the leader of the team classification
Denotes the leader of the points classification	Denotes the winner of the combativity award
Denotes the leader of the mountains classification	

== Stage 1 ==
28 April 2024 — Valencia, 16 km (9.9 mi) (TTT)

Stage 1 Result
Rank	Team	Time
1	(United States) Lidl–Trek	19' 20"
2	(Netherlands) Visma–Lease a Bike	+ 0"
3	(Netherlands) Team SD Worx–Protime	+ 1"
4	(Germany) Canyon//SRAM	+ 8"
5	(United States) EF Education–Cannondale	+ 9"
6	(France) FDJ–Suez	+ 9"
7	(Australia) Liv AlUla Jayco	+ 10"
8	(Spain) Movistar Team	+ 12"
9	(Netherlands) Team dsm–firmenich PostNL	+ 17"
10	(Belgium) AG Insurance–Soudal	+ 32"

General classification after Stage 1
Rank	Rider	Team	Time
1	Gaia Realini (ITA)	Lidl–Trek	19' 20"
2	Elizabeth Deignan (GBR)	Lidl–Trek	+ 0"
3	Brodie Chapman (AUS)	Lidl–Trek	+ 0"
4	Elisa Longo Borghini (ITA)	Lidl–Trek	+ 0"
5	Amanda Spratt (AUS)	Lidl–Trek	+ 0"
6	Elynor Bäckstedt (GBR)	Lidl–Trek	+ 0"
7	Ellen van Dijk (NED)	Lidl–Trek	+ 0"
8	Riejanne Markus (NED)	Visma–Lease a Bike	+ 0"
9	Anna Henderson (GBR)	Visma–Lease a Bike	+ 0"
10	Marianne Vos (NED)	Visma–Lease a Bike	+ 0"

== Stage 2 ==
29 April 2024 — Buñol to Moncofa, 118 km (73 mi)

Stage 2 Result
Rank	Rider	Team	Time
1	Alison Jackson (CAN)	EF Education–Cannondale	2h 51' 03"
2	Blanka Vas (HUN)	Team SD Worx–Protime	+ 0"
3	Karlijn Swinkels (NED)	UAE Team ADQ	+ 0"
4	Katarzyna Niewiadoma (POL)	Canyon//SRAM	+ 0"
5	Ingvild Gåskjenn (NOR)	Liv AlUla Jayco	+ 0"
6	Giorgia Vettorello (ITA)	Roland	+ 0"
7	Silke Smulders (NED)	Liv AlUla Jayco	+ 0"
8	Flora Perkins (GBR)	Fenix–Deceuninck	+ 0"
9	Amber Kraak (NED)	FDJ–Suez	+ 0"
10	Kristen Faulkner (USA)	EF Education–Cannondale	+ 0"

General classification after Stage 2
Rank	Rider	Team	Time
1	Blanka Vas (HUN)	Team SD Worx–Protime	3h 10' 14"
2	Alison Jackson (CAN)	EF Education–Cannondale	+ 8"
3	Elisa Longo Borghini (ITA)	Lidl–Trek	+ 9"
4	Eva van Agt (NED)	Visma–Lease a Bike	+ 9"
5	Sophie von Berswordt (NED)	Visma–Lease a Bike	+ 9"
6	Riejanne Markus (NED)	Visma–Lease a Bike	+ 9"
7	Marianne Vos (NED)	Visma–Lease a Bike	+ 9"
8	Amanda Spratt (AUS)	Lidl–Trek	+ 9"
9	Gaia Realini (ITA)	Lidl–Trek	+ 9"
10	Brodie Chapman (AUS)	Lidl–Trek	+ 9"

== Stage 3 ==
30 April 2024 — Lucena to Teruel, 131 km (81 mi)

Stage 3 Result
Rank	Rider	Team	Time
1	Marianne Vos (NED)	Visma–Lease a Bike	3h 46' 52"
2	Charlotte Kool (NED)	Team dsm–firmenich PostNL	+ 0"
3	Olivia Baril (CAN)	Movistar Team	+ 0"
4	Ingvild Gåskjenn (NOR)	Liv AlUla Jayco	+ 0"
5	Lily Williams (USA)	Human Powered Health	+ 0"
6	Flora Perkins (GBR)	Fenix–Deceuninck	+ 0"
7	Eleonora Ciabocco (ITA)	Team dsm–firmenich PostNL	+ 0"
8	Caroline Andersson (SWE)	Liv AlUla Jayco	+ 0"
9	Mischa Bredewold (NED)	Team SD Worx–Protime	+ 0"
10	Magdeleine Vallieres (CAN)	EF Education–Cannondale	+ 0"

General classification after Stage 3
Rank	Rider	Team	Time
1	Blanka Vas (HUN)	Team SD Worx–Protime	6h 57' 04"
2	Marianne Vos (NED)	Visma–Lease a Bike	+ 1"
3	Alison Jackson (CAN)	EF Education–Cannondale	+ 10"
4	Elisa Longo Borghini (ITA)	Lidl–Trek	+ 11"
5	Eva van Agt (NED)	Visma–Lease a Bike	+ 11"
6	Riejanne Markus (NED)	Visma–Lease a Bike	+ 11"
7	Amanda Spratt (AUS)	Lidl–Trek	+ 11"
8	Sophie von Berswordt (NED)	Visma–Lease a Bike	+ 11"
9	Gaia Realini (ITA)	Lidl–Trek	+ 11"
10	Brodie Chapman (AUS)	Lidl–Trek	+ 11"

== Stage 4 ==
1 May 2024 — Molina de Aragón to Zaragoza, 142 km (88 mi)

Stage 4 Result
Rank	Rider	Team	Time
1	Kristen Faulkner (USA)	EF Education–Cannondale	3h 02' 37"
2	Georgia Baker (AUS)	Liv AlUla Jayco	+ 10"
3	Marianne Vos (NED)	Visma–Lease a Bike	+ 10"
4	Blanka Vas (HUN)	Team SD Worx–Protime	+ 10"
5	Sheyla Gutiérrez (ESP)	Movistar Team	+ 10"
6	Maike van der Duin (NED)	Canyon//SRAM	+ 10"
7	Alison Jackson (CAN)	EF Education–Cannondale	+ 10"
8	Silke Smulders (NED)	Liv AlUla Jayco	+ 10"
9	Juliette Labous (FRA)	Team dsm–firmenich PostNL	+ 10"
10	Marlen Reusser (SUI)	Team SD Worx–Protime	+ 10"

General classification after Stage 4
Rank	Rider	Team	Time
1	Marianne Vos (NED)	Visma–Lease a Bike	9h 59' 42"
2	Blanka Vas (HUN)	Team SD Worx–Protime	+ 5"
3	Kristen Faulkner (USA)	EF Education–Cannondale	+ 9"
4	Elisa Longo Borghini (ITA)	Lidl–Trek	+ 18"
5	Alison Jackson (CAN)	EF Education–Cannondale	+ 19"
6	Riejanne Markus (NED)	Visma–Lease a Bike	+ 20"
7	Demi Vollering (NED)	Team SD Worx–Protime	+ 21"
8	Marlen Reusser (SUI)	Team SD Worx–Protime	+ 21"
9	Niamh Fisher-Black (NZL)	Team SD Worx–Protime	+ 21"
10	Katarzyna Niewiadoma (POL)	Canyon//SRAM	+ 28"

== Stage 5 ==
2 May 2024 — Huesca to Jaca, 113 km (70 mi)

Stage 5 Result
Rank	Rider	Team	Time
1	Demi Vollering (NED)	Team SD Worx–Protime	3h 09' 52"
2	Yara Kastelijn (NED)	Fenix–Deceuninck	+ 28"
3	Elisa Longo Borghini (ITA)	Lidl–Trek	+ 28"
4	Évita Muzic (FRA)	FDJ–Suez	+ 39"
5	Sarah Gigante (AUS)	AG Insurance–Soudal	+ 41"
6	Ricarda Bauernfeind (GER)	Canyon//SRAM	+ 44"
7	Riejanne Markus (NED)	Visma–Lease a Bike	+ 44"
8	Juliette Labous (FRA)	Team dsm–firmenich PostNL	+ 47"
9	Kim Cadzow (NZL)	EF Education–Cannondale	+ 57"
10	Pauliena Rooijakkers (NED)	Fenix–Deceuninck	+ 1' 08"

General classification after Stage 5
Rank	Rider	Team	Time
1	Demi Vollering (NED)	Team SD Worx–Protime	13h 09' 45"
2	Elisa Longo Borghini (ITA)	Lidl–Trek	+ 31"
3	Riejanne Markus (NED)	Visma–Lease a Bike	+ 53"
4	Kristen Faulkner (USA)	EF Education–Cannondale	+ 1' 10"
5	Juliette Labous (FRA)	Team dsm–firmenich PostNL	+ 1' 13"
6	Marlen Reusser (SUI)	Team SD Worx–Protime	+ 1' 23"
7	Niamh Fisher-Black (NZL)	Team SD Worx–Protime	+ 1' 34"
8	Katarzyna Niewiadoma (POL)	Canyon//SRAM	+ 1' 47"
9	Marianne Vos (NED)	Visma–Lease a Bike	+ 2' 07"
10	Silke Smulders (NED)	Liv AlUla Jayco	+ 2' 41"

== Stage 6 ==
6 3 May 2024 — Tarazona to La Laguna Negra, 132 km (82 mi)

Stage 6 Result
Rank	Rider	Team	Time
1	Évita Muzic (FRA)	FDJ–Suez	4h 10' 20"
2	Demi Vollering (NED)	Team SD Worx–Protime	+ 2"
3	Yara Kastelijn (NED)	Fenix–Deceuninck	+ 15"
4	Riejanne Markus (NED)	Visma–Lease a Bike	+ 17"
5	Elisa Longo Borghini (ITA)	Lidl–Trek	+ 21"
6	Ricarda Bauernfeind (GER)	Canyon//SRAM	+ 21"
7	Juliette Labous (FRA)	Team dsm–firmenich PostNL	+ 21"
8	Pauliena Rooijakkers (NED)	Fenix–Deceuninck	+ 33"
9	Niamh Fisher-Black (NZL)	Team SD Worx–Protime	+ 38"
10	Kim Cadzow (NZL)	EF Education–Cannondale	+ 40"

General classification after Stage 6
Rank	Rider	Team	Time
1	Demi Vollering (NED)	Team SD Worx–Protime	17h 20' 01"
2	Elisa Longo Borghini (ITA)	Lidl–Trek	+ 56"
3	Riejanne Markus (NED)	Visma–Lease a Bike	+ 1' 14"
4	Juliette Labous (FRA)	Team dsm–firmenich PostNL	+ 1' 38"
5	Niamh Fisher-Black (NZL)	Team SD Worx–Protime	+ 2' 16"
6	Évita Muzic (FRA)	FDJ–Suez	+ 2' 42"
7	Marlen Reusser (SUI)	Team SD Worx–Protime	+ 2' 52"
8	Ricarda Bauernfeind (GER)	Canyon//SRAM	+ 3' 17"
9	Yara Kastelijn (NED)	Fenix–Deceuninck	+ 3' 25"
10	Kristen Faulkner (USA)	EF Education–Cannondale	+ 3' 29"

== Stage 7 ==
4 May 2024 — San Esteban de Gormaz to Sigüenza, 126 km (78 mi)

Stage 7 Result
Rank	Rider	Team	Time
1	Marianne Vos (NED)	Visma–Lease a Bike	3h 27' 56"
2	Kristen Faulkner (USA)	EF Education–Cannondale	+ 2"
3	Elisa Longo Borghini (ITA)	Lidl–Trek	+ 2"
4	Demi Vollering (NED)	Team SD Worx–Protime	+ 2"
5	Ingvild Gåskjenn (NOR)	Liv AlUla Jayco	+ 2"
6	Niamh Fisher-Black (NZL)	Team SD Worx–Protime	+ 2"
7	Riejanne Markus (NED)	Visma–Lease a Bike	+ 2"
8	Évita Muzic (FRA)	FDJ–Suez	+ 2"
9	Pauliena Rooijakkers (NED)	Fenix–Deceuninck	+ 8"
10	Eline Jansen (NED)	VolkerWessels Women Cyclingteam	+ 10"

General classification after Stage 7
Rank	Rider	Team	Time
1	Demi Vollering (NED)	Team SD Worx–Protime	20h 47' 59"
2	Elisa Longo Borghini (ITA)	Lidl–Trek	+ 52"
3	Riejanne Markus (NED)	Visma–Lease a Bike	+ 1' 14"
4	Juliette Labous (FRA)	Team dsm–firmenich PostNL	+ 1' 48"
5	Niamh Fisher-Black (NZL)	Team SD Worx–Protime	+ 2' 16"
6	Évita Muzic (FRA)	FDJ–Suez	+ 2' 42"
7	Kristen Faulkner (USA)	EF Education–Cannondale	+ 3' 23"
8	Marlen Reusser (SUI)	Team SD Worx–Protime	+ 3' 24"
9	Ricarda Bauernfeind (GER)	Canyon//SRAM	+ 3' 27"
10	Yara Kastelijn (NED)	Fenix–Deceuninck	+ 4' 07"

== Stage 8 ==
5 May 2024 — Distrito Telefónica to Valdesquí, 89 km (55 mi)

Stage 8 Result
Rank	Rider	Team	Time
1	Demi Vollering (NED)	Team SD Worx–Protime	2h 43' 06"
2	Évita Muzic (FRA)	FDJ–Suez	+ 29"
3	Riejanne Markus (NED)	Visma–Lease a Bike	+ 33"
4	Pauliena Rooijakkers (NED)	Fenix–Deceuninck	+ 53"
5	Ricarda Bauernfeind (GER)	Canyon//SRAM	+ 56"
6	Juliette Labous (FRA)	Team dsm–firmenich PostNL	+ 1' 00"
7	Elisa Longo Borghini (ITA)	Lidl–Trek	+ 1' 00"
8	Antonia Niedermaier (GER)	Canyon//SRAM	+ 1' 00"
9	Yara Kastelijn (NED)	Fenix–Deceuninck	+ 1' 10"
10	Kim Cadzow (NZL)	EF Education–Cannondale	+ 1' 28"

General classification after Stage 8
Rank	Rider	Team	Time
1	Demi Vollering (NED)	Team SD Worx–Protime	23h 30' 55"
2	Riejanne Markus (NED)	Visma–Lease a Bike	+ 1' 49"
3	Elisa Longo Borghini (ITA)	Lidl–Trek	+ 2' 00"
4	Juliette Labous (FRA)	Team dsm–firmenich PostNL	+ 2' 58"
5	Évita Muzic (FRA)	FDJ–Suez	+ 3' 15"
6	Ricarda Bauernfeind (GER)	Canyon//SRAM	+ 4' 33"
7	Niamh Fisher-Black (NZL)	Team SD Worx–Protime	+ 5' 14"
8	Yara Kastelijn (NED)	Fenix–Deceuninck	+ 5' 27"
9	Pauliena Rooijakkers (NED)	Fenix–Deceuninck	+ 5' 42"
10	Kim Cadzow (NZL)	EF Education–Cannondale	+ 6' 19"
