= 2023 Tour de France Femmes =

Women's cycling race

2023 UCI Women's World Tour, race 21 of 27
- Route of the 2023 Tour de France Femmes

Race details
- Dates: 23–30 July
- Stages: 8
- Distance: 960.5 km (596.8 mi)
- Winning time: 25h 17' 35"

Results
Jersey awarded to the overall winner	Winner	Demi Vollering (NED)	(SD Worx)
	Second	Lotte Kopecky (BEL)	(SD Worx)
	Third	Katarzyna Niewiadoma (POL)	(Canyon//SRAM)
Jersey awarded to the points classification winner	Points	Lotte Kopecky (BEL)	(SD Worx)
Jersey awarded to the mountains classification winner	Mountains	Katarzyna Niewiadoma (POL)	(Canyon//SRAM)
Jersey awarded to the young rider classification winner	Young rider	Cédrine Kerbaol (FRA)	(Ceratizit–WNT Pro Cycling)
Jersey awarded to the combativity classification winner	Combativity	Yara Kastelijn (NED)	(Fenix–Deceuninck)
Jersey awarded to the team classification winner	Team	SD Worx	

The 2023 Tour de France Femmes (officially 2023 Tour de France Femmes avec Zwift) was the second edition of the Tour de France Femmes. The race took place from 23 to 30 July 2023, and was the 21st race in the 2023 UCI Women's World Tour calendar. The race was organised by the Amaury Sport Organisation (ASO), which also organises the men's Tour de France.

The race was won by Demi Vollering of SD Worx, beating her rival Annemiek van Vleuten (Movistar Team) with a dominant stage win on the Col du Tourmalet. Second place went to Vollering's teammate Lotte Kopecky, who wore the yellow jersey for six stages after winning the first stage. The podium was rounded out by Katarzyna Niewiadoma of Canyon//SRAM for the second year in a row.

In the race's other classifications, Kopecky won the points classification. Apart from finishing third in the general classification (GC), Niewiadoma also took the polka-dot jersey as winner of the Queen of the Mountains (QoM) classification. Cédrine Kerbaol of Ceratizit–WNT Pro Cycling took the white jersey as the winner of the young riders classification, which was awarded to the best-placed GC rider under the age of 23. Yara Kastelijn took the super-combativity award to add to her win on stage 4. SD Worx won the team classification as the team with the lowest aggregate time among their three best-placed riders.

Overall, the race was highly praised by the public, media, teams and riders – with large crowds and high TV viewership. Race director Marion Rousse stated that the 2023 edition "was the year of confirmation: we had to prove that the first edition was not just curiosity".

== Teams ==
The 22 teams which participated in the race were announced on 14 April 2023. Each team had seven riders, one more than the 2022 edition. All 15 UCI Women's WorldTeams were automatically invited. They were joined by seven UCI Women's Continental Teams – the two best 2022 UCI Women's Continental Teams (Ceratizit–WNT Pro Cycling and Lifeplus–Wahoo) received an automatic invitation, and the other five teams were selected by Amaury Sport Organisation (ASO), the organisers of the Tour. A total of 154 riders from 27 nationalities started the race, with the Netherlands having the largest contingent (29 riders).

UCI Women's WorldTeams

- Canyon//SRAM
- EF Education–Tibco–SVB
- FDJ–Suez
- Fenix–Deceuninck
- Human Powered Health
- Israel Premier Tech Roland
- Lidl–Trek
- Liv Racing TeqFind
- Movistar Team
- SD Worx
- Team dsm–firmenich
- Team Jayco–AlUla
- Team Jumbo–Visma
- UAE Team ADQ
- Uno-X Pro Cycling Team

UCI Women's Continental Teams

- AG Insurance–Soudal–Quick-Step
- Arkéa Pro Cycling Team
- Ceratizit–WNT Pro Cycling
- Cofidis
- Lifeplus Wahoo
- St. Michel–Mavic–Auber93
- Team Coop–Hitec Products

== Route and stages ==
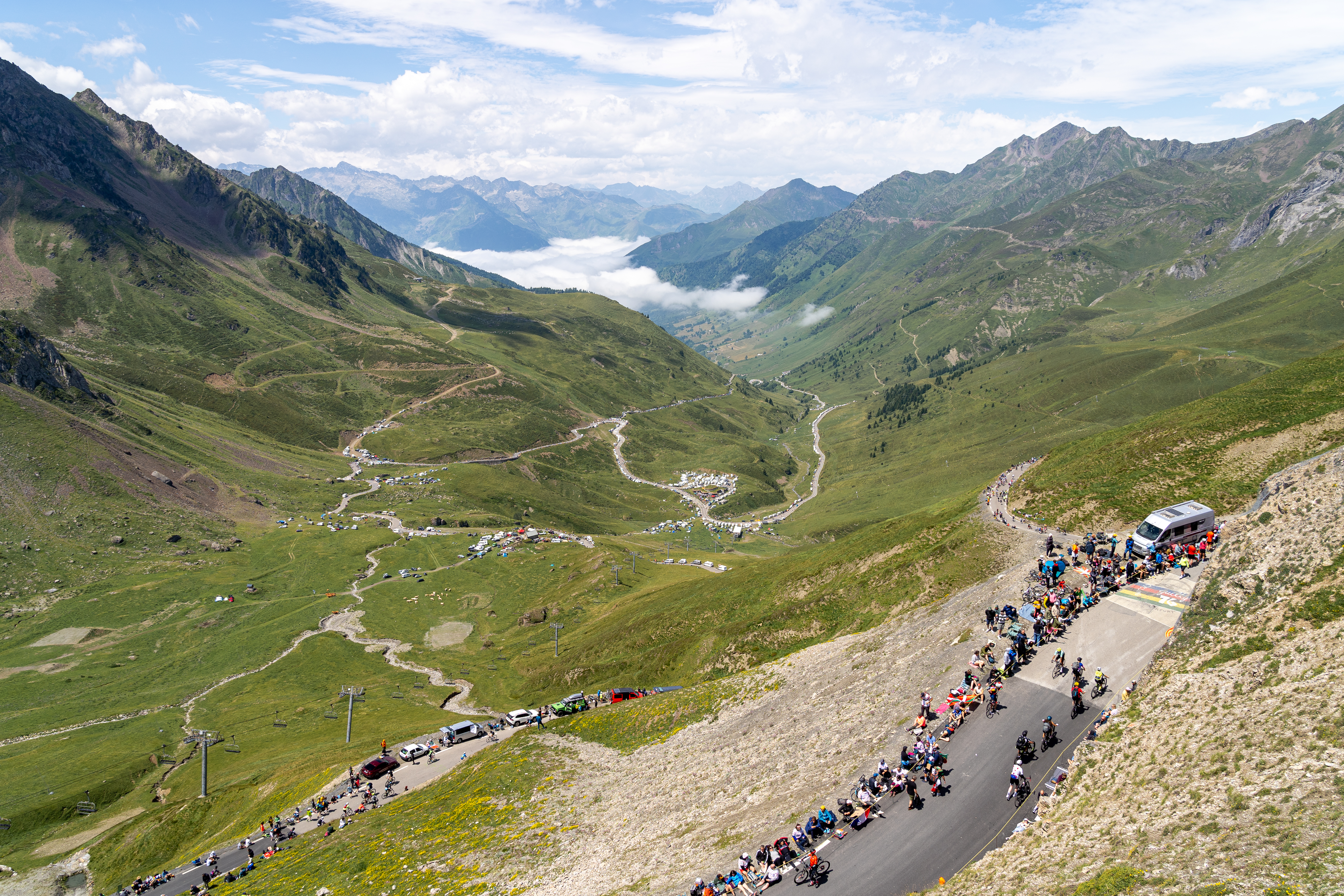
View from the Col du Tourmalet, the finish of stage 7 at elevation of 2,115 m (6,939 ft)

In October 2022, the route was announced by race director Marion Rousse. It comprised eight consecutive days of racing, covering a total of 960.5 kilometres (596.8 mi). The race started in Clermont-Ferrand on the same day that the men's tour finished in Paris, before heading south across the Massif Central (including the longest, stage 4) towards the Pyrenees mountains. The penultimate stage was the queen stage of the Tour, with a summit finish at the Col du Tourmalet in the Pyrenees at an elevation of 2,115 m (6,939 ft). The final stage was an individual time trial in Pau, using a similar course to the 2019 edition of La Course by Le Tour de France. 2022 winner Annemiek van Vleuten called the route "an upgrade", with other riders welcoming the inclusion of bigger climbs and a time trial.

As with the 2022 edition, the route required a waiver from the Union Cycliste Internationale, as 2023 Women's WorldTour races have a maximum stage length of 160 kilometres (99 mi) and a maximum race length of six days.

Stage characteristics
Stage	Date	Course	Distance	Elevation gain	Type	Winner
1	23 July	Clermont-Ferrand to Clermont-Ferrand	123.8 km (76.9 mi)	1,044 m (3,425 ft)	Flat stage	Lotte Kopecky (BEL)
2	24 July	Clermont-Ferrand to Mauriac	151.7 km (94.3 mi)	2,422 m (7,946 ft)	Hilly stage	Liane Lippert (GER)
3	25 July	Collonges-la-Rouge to Montignac-Lascaux	147.2 km (91.5 mi)	1,846 m (6,056 ft)	Flat stage	Lorena Wiebes (NED)
4	26 July	Cahors to Rodez	177.1 km (110.0 mi)	2,503 m (8,212 ft)	Hilly stage	Yara Kastelijn (NED)
5	27 July	Onet-le-Château to Albi	126.1 km (78.4 mi)	1,722 m (5,650 ft)	Flat stage	Ricarda Bauernfeind (GER)
6	28 July	Albi to Blagnac	122.1 km (75.9 mi)	1,162 m (3,812 ft)	Flat stage	Emma Norsgaard (DEN)
7	29 July	Lannemezan to Tourmalet Bagnères-de-Bigorre	89.9 km (55.9 mi)	2,613 m (8,573 ft)	Mountain stage	Demi Vollering (NED)
8	30 July	Pau	22.6 km (14.0 mi)	198 m (650 ft)	Individual time trial	Marlen Reusser (SUI)
Total			960.5 km (596.8 mi)	13,510 m (44,320 ft)		

== Race overview ==
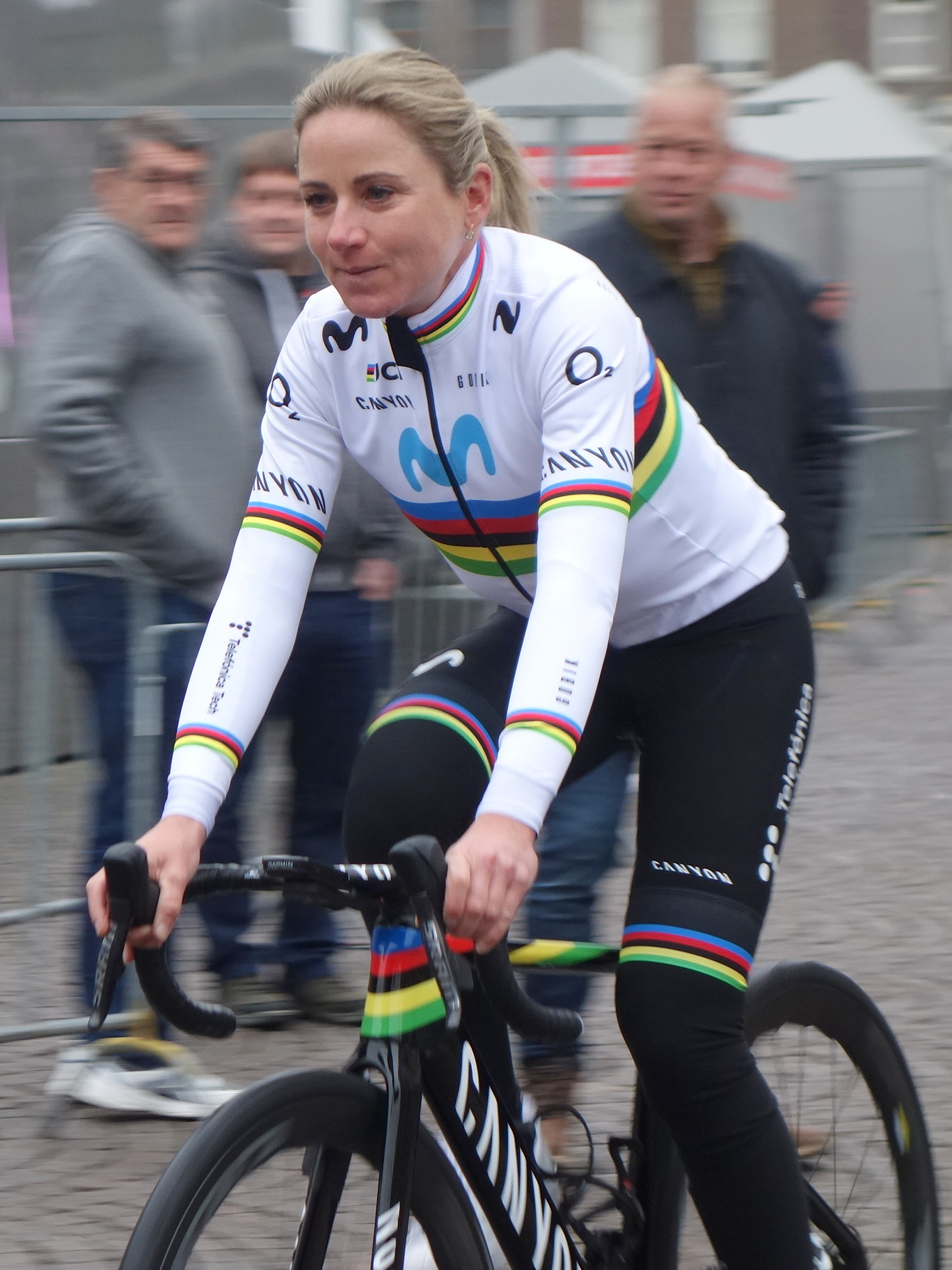
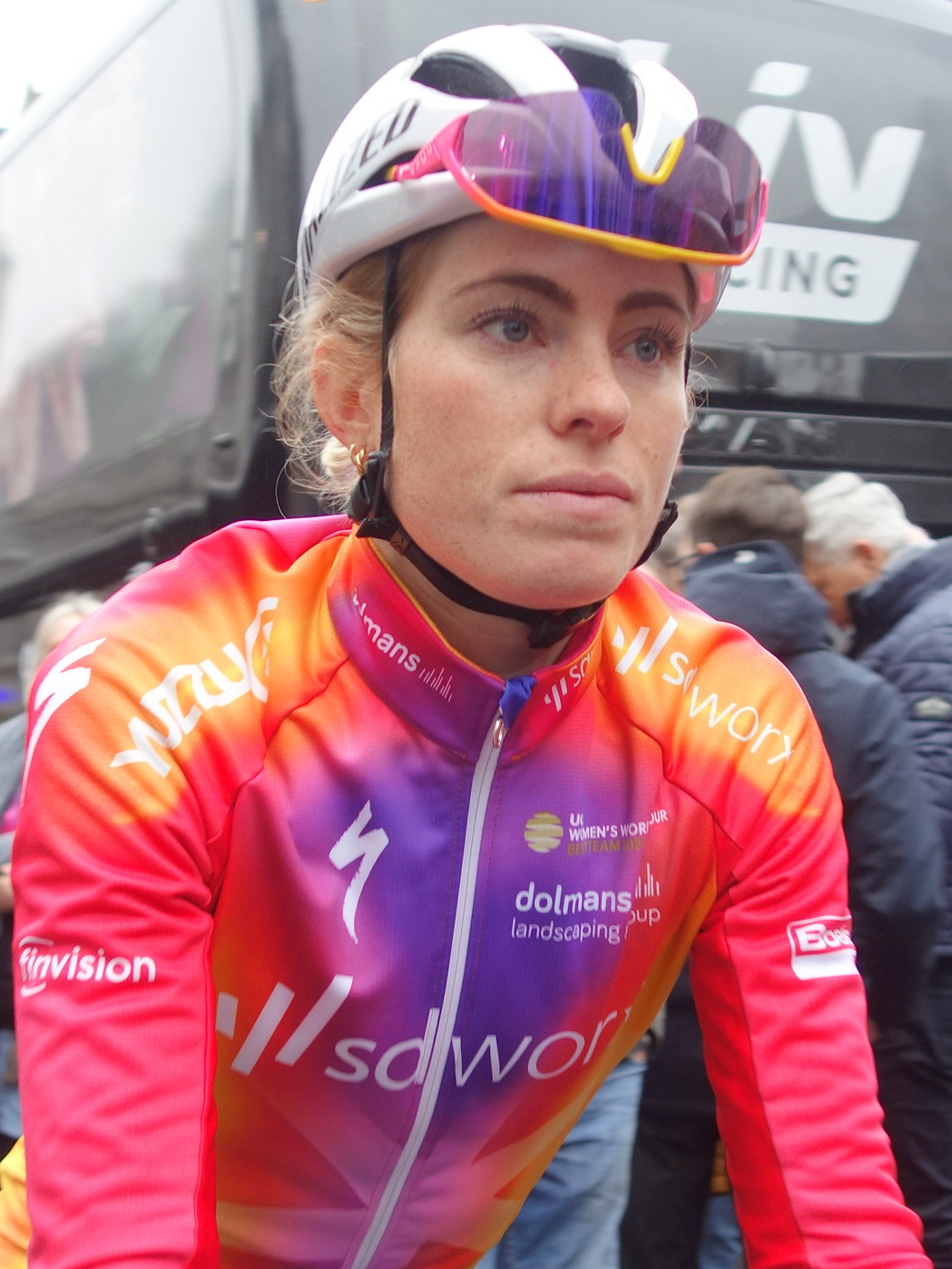
Annemiek van Vleuten (left) and Demi Vollering (right) were considered favourites for the general classification (GC)

Ahead of the race, Annemiek van Vleuten and Demi Vollering were considered pre-race favourites for the general classification (GC), following Van Vleuten's wins earlier in the season at La Vuelta Femenina and Giro Donne, and Vollering's second places at La Vuelta Femenina and the 2022 Tour de France Femmes. Other contenders tipped for the general classification (GC) included Elisa Longo Borghini, Juliette Labous, Ashleigh Moolman Pasio and Veronica Ewers.

Lorena Wiebes, Charlotte Kool, and Silvia Persico were considered favourites for the points classification, with Van Vleuten and Vollering tipped for the mountains classification. Eleonora Gasparrini, Cédrine Kerbaol and Alice Towers were considered favourites for the young rider classification, and SD Worx were considered favourites for the team classification.

Overall, the field of 154 riders was described as "stacked", with the top 13 finishers from the 2022 edition all taking part. Media coverage prior to the event was very positive, with anticipation of the summit finish at the Col du Tourmalet and the time trial in Pau. The start in Clermont-Ferrand was also welcomed, with Rouleur stating it "breaks the shackles that tie it to the men's race". The prize fund remained at €250,000 (compared to €2.3 million for the men's tour), with €50,000 for the winner of the general classification – making it one of the richest races in women's cycling.

=== Early stages ===
Taking place earlier on the same day of the final stage of the men's Tour, stage 1 of the race looped around Clermont-Ferrand. On the final climb, Lotte Kopecky (SD Worx) attacked, accelerating further in the final 5 kilometres (3.1 mi). She took a solo stage win by 41 seconds, taking the first maillot jaune (yellow jersey) of the race, as well as the points classification and the Queen of the Mountains (QoM) classification. Cédrine Kerbaol (Ceratizit–WNT Pro Cycling) took the lead in the young rider classification.

The second stage took the riders south from Clermont-Ferrand to Mauriac, over a hilly course with six categorised climbs. The second half of the stage was affected by heavy rain, with several riders crashing in the last 20 kilometres (12 mi), including Eva van Agt (Jumbo–Visma) who was taken to hospital with a concussion. In the uphill sprint towards the finish line, Demi Vollering (SD Worx) led out her teammate Kopecky, however Liane Lippert (Movistar Team) overtook Kopecky in the final 100 metres to win the stage. After the stage, Kopecky realised she had a slow puncture that had dampened her sprint. Kopecky retained the yellow jersey of the general classification (GC), with Yara Kastelijn (Fenix–Deceuninck) taking the lead of the QoM classification.

Stage 3 to Montignac-Lascaux took the riders westwards over a flat course, with a bunch sprint expected. Julie Van de Velde (Fenix–Deceuninck) escaped with around 60 km (37 mi) of the stage remaining. Taking QoM points over the final two climbs, she took the lead of the mountains classification while building up a lead of around a minute. In the final sprint, Van de Velde was caught by the peloton with 300 metres to go, with Lorena Wiebes (SD Worx) winning the bunch sprint for the stage.

The fourth stage to Rodez was a hilly course, with five categorised climbs, another climb with bonus seconds at the top and a steep finish into Rodez. It was also the longest stage of the race at 177.1 km (110.0 mi) in length. A breakaway gained 10 minutes over the peloton, before Yara Kastelijn attacked from the break on the final climb. Behind her, GC rivals Demi Vollering (SD Worx) and Annemiek Van Vleuten (Movistar Team) attacked each other, overtaking remains of the breakaway approaching the finish. Kastelijn's solo attack won her the stage by 1 min 11 s, her first major stage win in the UCI Women's World Tour. Behind Kastelijn, Vollering attacked in the steep final kilometre to take second place on GC, eight seconds ahead of her main rival Van Vleuten thanks to six bonus seconds at the finish line. Kopecky retained her yellow jersey of the GC, with Anouska Koster (Jumbo–Visma) talking the polka dot jersey of the QoM classification thanks to the points collected while in the breakaway.

Stage 5 to Albi took the riders south over a flat course, heading towards the Pyrenees. Prior to the start, stage 3 winner Wiebes withdrew due to illness. Kastelijn took the QoM points over the first two climbs, taking the lead in the mountains classification. Ricarda Bauernfeind (Canyon–SRAM), an experienced time trialist, attacked from the peloton, eventually building up a lead of around 1 min 30 s. The peloton gave chase, however the gap did not fall fast enough to catch her. In the closing kilometres, Lippert and Marlen Reusser (SD Worx) attempted to catch her. Bauernfeind was too strong, and crossed the finish line 22 seconds ahead of the pair. During the stage, Vollering suffered a puncture, before drafting her team car to get back to the main bunch, drawing the ire of commissaires. She was subsequently penalised 20 seconds in the general classification, dropping her to seventh place in the GC, 12 seconds behind her rival Van Vleuten. The following day, SD Worx directeur sportif Danny Stam was removed from the race due to "inappropriate comments" made to the commissaires, as well as his "dangerous overtaking ... of cars and riders" while Vollering was drafting his car.

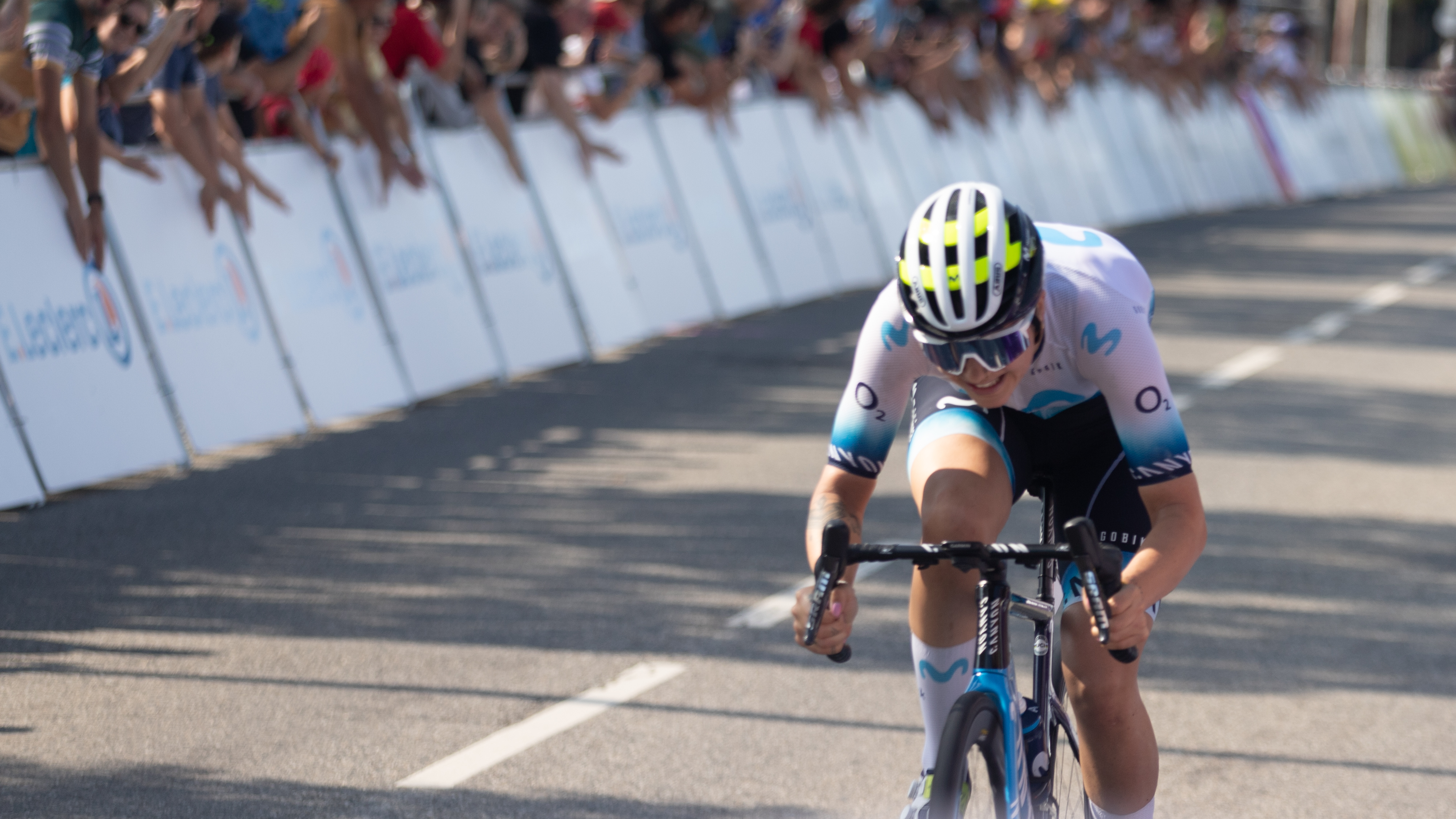
Emma Norsgaard (Movistar Team) at the finish of stage 6 into Blagnac

Stage 6 to Blagnac was the final chance for sprinters to win, given the parcours of the remaining stages. A breakaway including Emma Norsgaard (Movistar Team) was formed with around 70 km (43 mi) to go, establishing a two-minute lead. During the stage, GC contender Veronica Ewers (EF Education–Tibco–SVB) crashed heavily. She finished the stage, albeit in pain – it later transpired that Ewers had a broken collarbone and would not start stage 7. In the closing kilometres of the stage, the gap to the breakaway steadily fell as the sprinters teams gave chase. In the final 2 kilometres (1.2 mi), a tight chicane over the Toulouse tramway caused a small crash, distracting the peloton and delaying some riders as they gave chase. With 600 metres to the finish, Norsgaard launched an attack, as the gap collapsed behind her. Norsgaard held on to win the stage by a second. Charlotte Kool (Team DSM–Firmenich) finished second, with third placed Kopecky in the yellow jersey visibly annoyed not to have caught Norsgaard before the finish line. Riders subsequently criticised the chicane that was located close to the finish, with Ashleigh Moolman Pasio (AG Insurance–Soudal–Quick-Step) calling it "super, super dangerous".

=== Mountain stage to Col du Tourmalet ===
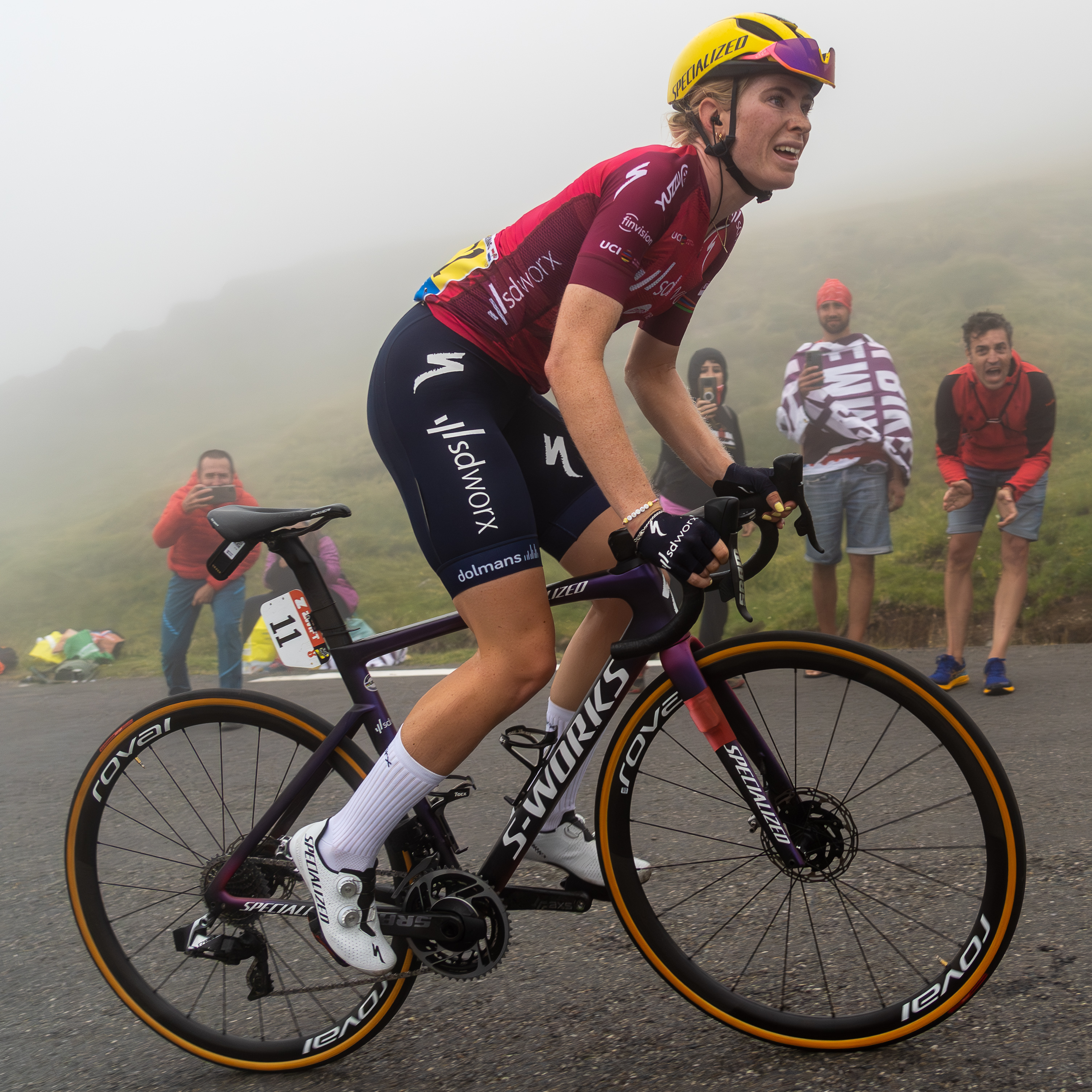
Demi Vollering (SD Worx) on the ascent of the Col du Tourmalet on stage 7

The seventh stage of the race took the riders over two major climbs in the Pyrenees mountains, and was considered as the queen stage of the race. Starting with the first category Col d'Aspin (12 km with an average gradient of 6.5 percent), riders then ascended the hors catégorie (English: beyond category) Col du Tourmalet (17.1 km with an average gradient of 7.5 percent), finishing at the summit at an elevation of 2,115 m (6,939 ft). The climbs were last tackled by the peloton at the 2007 Grande Boucle, with a summit finish last occurring in the 2000 edition of the race.

Prior to the start of the stage, Elisa Longo Borghini (Lidl–Trek) who was fourth on GC, withdrew from the race due to a skin infection. After initial skirmishes, the peloton hit the Col d'Aspin with GC contenders immediately powering away from the rest of the field. Van Vleuten launched an attack 5 kilometres (3.1 mi) from the top, followed by her rival Vollering as well as Katarzyna Niewiadoma (Canyon–SRAM). Niewiadoma took the QoM at the top of the climb. On the descent, Niewiadoma was substantially faster than both Vollering and Van Vleuten. The two rivals did not wish to work together to chase her, deciding to wait for teammates behind. This allowed Niewiadoma's lead to balloon to nearly 45 seconds.

On the ascent of the Col du Tourmalet, the yellow jersey group including Juliette Labous (DSM–Firmenich), Moolman Pasio, Reusser, Kopecky, Vollering and Van Vleuten worked to reduce the gap to Niewiadoma to just six seconds. But Niewiadoma kept working, eventually extending her lead to 30 seconds with 10 kilometres (6.2 mi) to go. In thick fog, Vollering attacked with 5 kilometres (3.1 mi) to the summit, with Van Vleuten unable to follow. Passing Niewiadoma a few kilometres later, Vollering soloed to the top of the climb, winning the stage by 1 min 58 s ahead of Niewiadoma. Van Vleuten finished the stage 2 min 34 s behind Vollering in third, with the yellow jersey of Kopecky finishing sixth on the stage, 3 min 32 s behind Vollering.

Vollering therefore took the yellow jersey of the general classification, with a lead of 1 min 50 s ahead of Niewiadoma. Van Vleuten took third on GC, 2 min 28 s behind Vollering. Kopecky fell to fourth overall, just seven seconds behind Van Vleuten and four seconds ahead of Moolman Pasio in fifth place. Niewiadoma took the polka dot jersey of the mountains classification, with a four-point lead over Kastelijn. Kopecky retained her green jersey of the points classification. Kerbaol retained the young rider classification, despite losing 44 seconds to her rival Ella Wyllie (Lifeplus–Wahoo).

=== Time trial in Pau ===
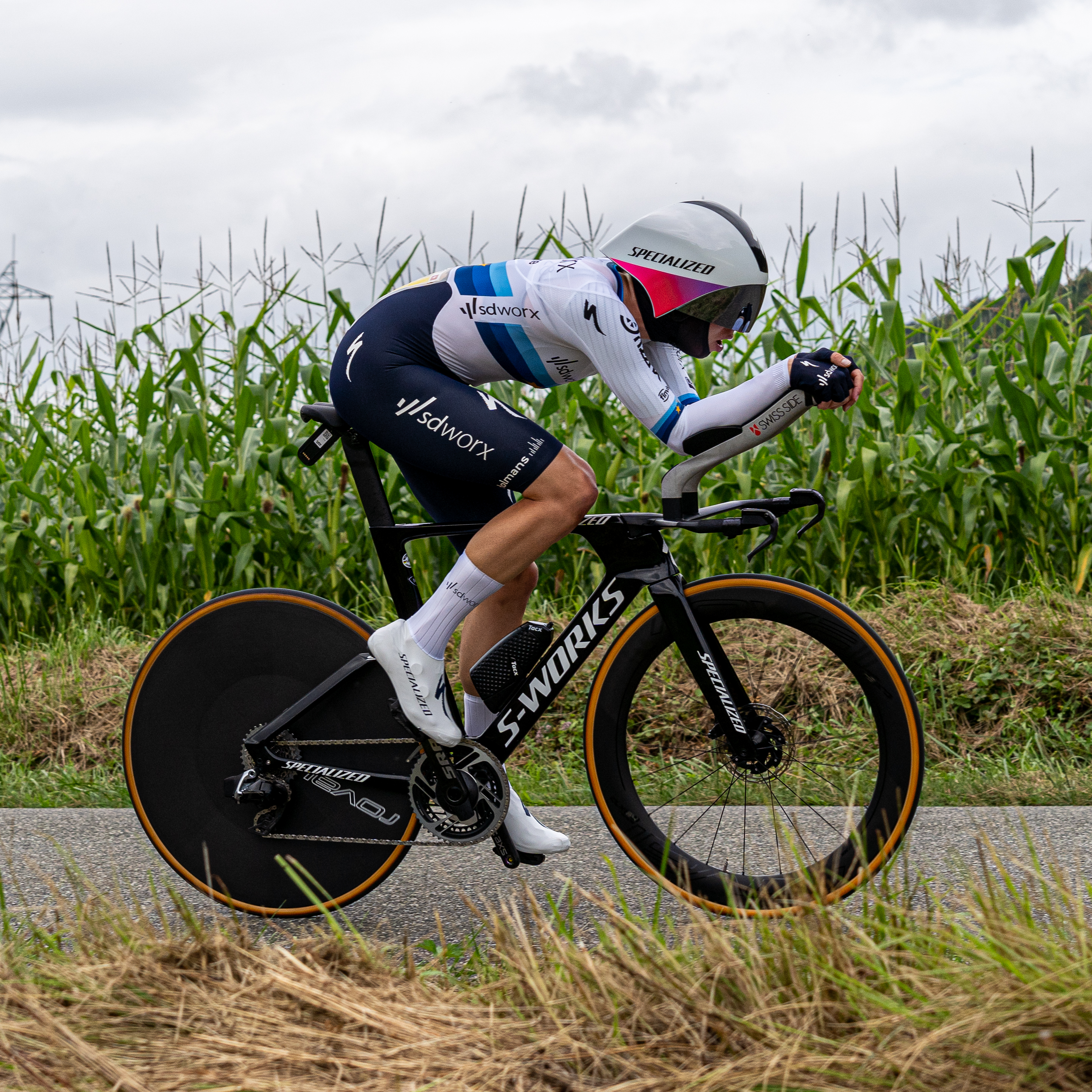
Marlen Reusser (SD Worx) riding the stage 8 time trial in Pau

The final stage of the race was an individual time trial over a twisting 22.6 kilometres (14.0 mi) course in Pau. The course was similar to one previously used for a time trial at the 2019 Tour de France, as well as for the 2019 La Course by Le Tour de France stage race. It was considered unlikely that Vollering would lose the yellow jersey on the stage, in light of her lead over Niewiadoma. However third placed Kopecky was just seven seconds behind Van Vleuten and four seconds ahead of Moolman-Pasio.

The fastest time on the stage was set by Reusser, two-time silver medalist at the time trial world championships and silver medalist in the time trial at Tokyo 2020. Kopecky then set a fast time, 38 seconds slower than Reusser. Next on the stage was Van Vleuten, who finished 1 min 41 s slower than Reusser. Finishing fourteenth on the stage, she fell off the overall podium into fourth place. Niewiadoma had a 38-second lead over Van Vleuten, and a 45-second lead over Kopecky. Her time trial was 1 min 23 s slower than Reusser, finishing ninth on the stage. Kopecky therefore took second place overall by 21 hundredths of a second. Niewiadoma was third overall.

The last rider to start was Vollering, who finished second on the stage, 10 seconds behind Reusser – sealing her victory in the Tour de France Femmes.

=== Results ===
In the final general classification (GC), Demi Vollering (SD Worx) won the Tour de France Femmes with an advantage over her teammate Lotte Kopecky of over three minutes. Finishing in third place for the second year in a row was Katarzyna Niewiadoma (Canyon//SRAM), who finished 21 hundredths of a second behind Kopecky. Vollering retained her lead in the UCI Women's World Tour standings.

In the race's other classifications, Kopecky won the points classification. Apart from finishing third in the GC, Niewiadoma also took the polka-dot jersey as winner of the Queen of the Mountains (QoM) classification. Cédrine Kerbaol of Ceratizit–WNT Pro Cycling took the white jersey as the winner of the young riders classification, which was awarded to the best-placed GC rider under the age of 23. SD Worx won the team classification as the team with the lowest aggregate time among their three best-placed riders. Yara Kastelijn took the super-combativity award to add to her win on stage 4. Out of 154 starters, 123 finished the event.

Vollering expressed her delight following her victory, stating that she "still can't believe it". She also expressed her hope that the Tour has "inspired many young girls and women". Her rival Van Vleuten was disappointed with her performance, and praised Vollering for her victory. She also explained that illness had dampened her performance in both the mountainous stage 7 and the final time trial. Niewiadoma was pleased with her polka dot jersey, while expressing disappointment about losing second place overall. Kopecky's strong performance was praised, with L'Équipe calling her "the Wout van Aert of women's cycling". Overall, SD Worx dominated the event, with 1st and 2nd place in the overall classification, 1st in the points and team classifications, as well as 4 stage wins.

== Classification leadership ==
There were four main individual classifications contested in the 2023 Tour de France Femmes, as well as a team competition. The most important was the general classification, which was calculated by adding each rider's finishing times on each stage. The rider with the lowest cumulative time was the winner of the general classification and was considered the overall winner of the Tour de France Femmes. The rider leading the classification wore a yellow jersey.

The second classification was the points classification. Riders received points for finishing in the top fifteen positions in a stage finish, or in intermediate sprints during the stage. The points available for each stage finish were determined by the stage's type, with flat stages awarding more points than mountain stages. The leader was identified by a green jersey.

The third classification was the mountains classification. Most stages of the race included one or more categorised climbs, in which points were awarded to the riders that reached the summit first. Climbs were categorised with category 4 being the easiest and hors catégorie the hardest. The leader wore a white jersey with red polka dots.

The final individual classification was the young rider classification. This was calculated the same way as the general classification, but the classification was restricted to riders under the age of 23. The leader wore a white jersey.

The final classification was a team classification. This was calculated using the finishing times of the best three riders per team on each stage; the leading team was the team with the lowest cumulative time. The number of stage victories and placings per team determined the outcome of a tie. The riders in the team that lead this classification were identified with yellow number bibs on the back of their jerseys.

In addition, there was a combativity award given after each stage to the rider considered, by a jury, to have demonstrated effort and sportsmanship. The winner wore a red number bib the following stage. At the conclusion of the Tour, the jury awarded the super-combativity award to the rider who demonstrated this throughout the race.

Classification leadership by stage
Stage	Winner	General classification	Points classification	Mountains classification	Young rider classification	Team classification	Combativity award
1	Lotte Kopecky	Lotte Kopecky	Lotte Kopecky (Note: On stages 2, 3, 6 and 7, Ashleigh Moolman Pasio, who was second in the points classification, wore the green jersey, because first placed Lotte Kopecky wore the yellow jersey as the leader of the general classification.) (Note: On stages 4 and 5, Ashleigh Moolman Pasio, who was third in the points classification, wore the green jersey, because first placed Lotte Kopecky wore the yellow jersey as the leader of the general classification, and second placed Lorena Wiebes wore the European Champion's jersey.)	Lotte Kopecky (Note: On stage 2, Katarzyna Niewiadoma, who was second in the mountains classification, wore the polka dot jersey, because first placed Lotte Kopecky wore the yellow jersey as the leader of the general classification.)	Cédrine Kerbaol	SD Worx	Marta Lach
2	Liane Lippert	Lotte Kopecky	Lotte Kopecky	Yara Kastelijn	Cédrine Kerbaol	SD Worx	Anouska Koster
3	Lorena Wiebes	Lotte Kopecky	Lotte Kopecky	Julie Van de Velde	Cédrine Kerbaol	SD Worx	Julie Van de Velde
4	Yara Kastelijn	Lotte Kopecky	Lotte Kopecky	Anouska Koster	Cédrine Kerbaol	SD Worx	Yara Kastelijn
5	Ricarda Bauernfeind	Lotte Kopecky	Lotte Kopecky	Yara Kastelijn	Cédrine Kerbaol	SD Worx	Ricarda Bauernfeind
6	Emma Norsgaard	Lotte Kopecky	Lotte Kopecky	Yara Kastelijn	Cédrine Kerbaol	SD Worx	Agnieszka Skalniak-Sójka
7	Demi Vollering	Demi Vollering	Lotte Kopecky	Katarzyna Niewiadoma	Cédrine Kerbaol	SD Worx	Katarzyna Niewiadoma
8	Marlen Reusser	Demi Vollering	Lotte Kopecky	Katarzyna Niewiadoma	Cédrine Kerbaol	SD Worx	no award
Final		Demi Vollering	Lotte Kopecky	Katarzyna Niewiadoma	Cédrine Kerbaol	SD Worx	Yara Kastelijn

== Classification standings ==
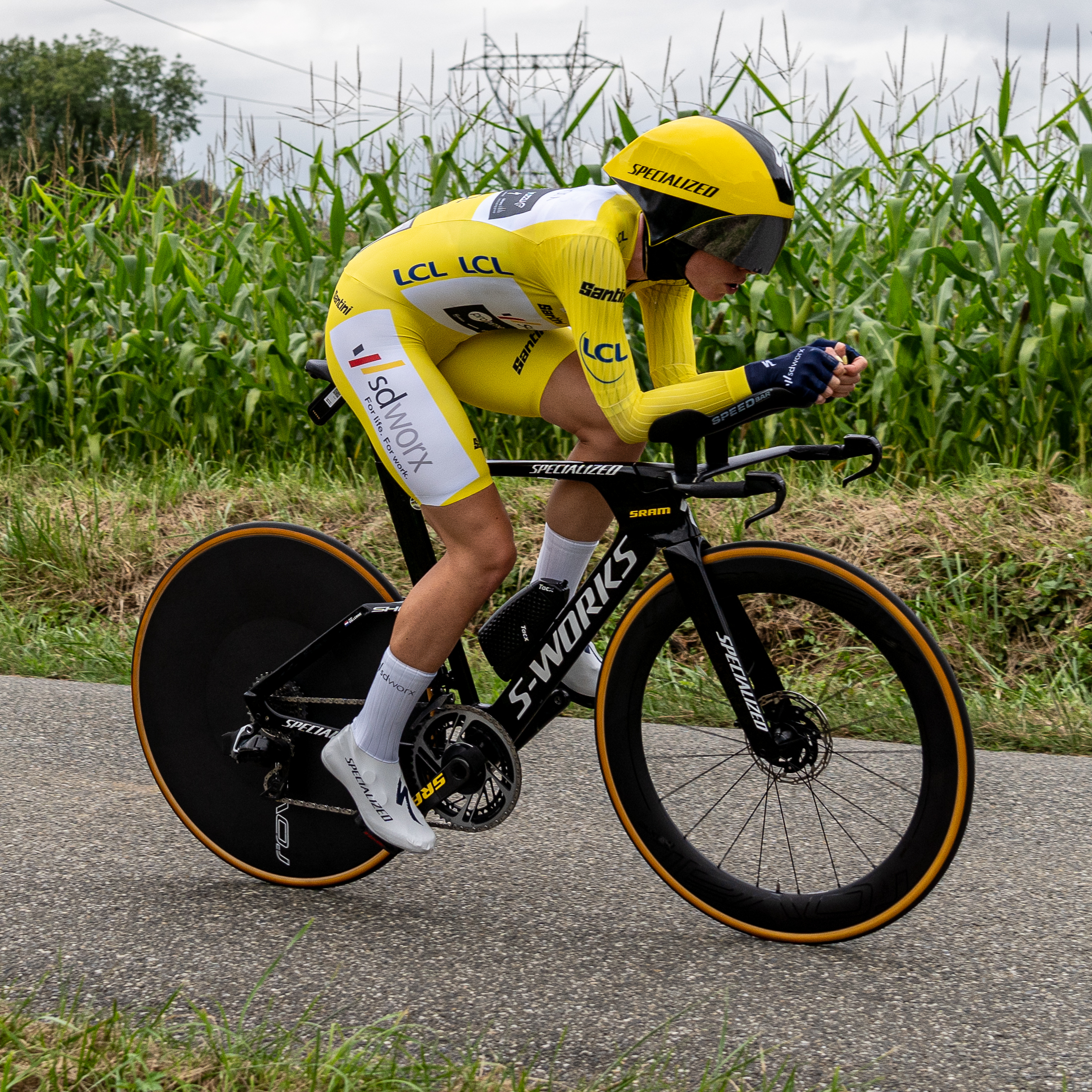
Winner of the general classification, Demi Vollering (pictured on stage 8)

Legend
Denotes the winner of the general classification	Denotes the winner of the mountains classification
Denotes the winner of the points classification	Denotes the winner of the young rider classification
Denotes the winner of the team classification	Denotes the winner of the combativity award

=== General classification ===
Final general classification (1–10)
Rank	Rider	Team	Time
1	Demi Vollering (NED)	SD Worx	25h 17' 35"
2	Lotte Kopecky (BEL)	SD Worx	+ 3' 03"
3	Katarzyna Niewiadoma (POL)	Canyon//SRAM	+ 3' 03"
4	Annemiek van Vleuten (NED)	Movistar Team	+ 3' 59"
5	Juliette Labous (FRA)	Team dsm–firmenich	+ 4' 48"
6	Ashleigh Moolman (RSA)	AG Insurance–Soudal–Quick-Step	+ 5' 21"
7	Cecilie Uttrup Ludwig (DEN)	FDJ–Suez	+ 9' 09"
8	Ane Santesteban (ESP)	Team Jayco–AlUla	+ 9' 36"
9	Ricarda Bauernfeind (GER)	Canyon//SRAM	+ 9' 56"
10	Amanda Spratt (AUS)	Lidl–Trek	+ 10' 14"

Final general classification (11–123)
Rank	Rider	Team	Time
11	Riejanne Markus (NED)	Team Jumbo–Visma	+ 10' 32"
12	Cédrine Kerbaol (FRA)	Ceratizit–WNT Pro Cycling	+ 12' 27"
13	Erica Magnaldi (ITA)	UAE Team ADQ	+ 13' 51"
14	Silvia Persico (ITA)	UAE Team ADQ	+ 14' 00"
15	Clara Koppenburg (GER)	Cofidis	+ 14' 38"
16	Ella Wyllie (NZL)	Lifeplus Wahoo	+ 15' 35"
17	Amber Kraak (NED)	Team Jumbo–Visma	+ 17' 11"
18	Claire Steels (GBR)	Israel Premier Tech Roland	+ 17' 21"
19	Marta Cavalli (ITA)	FDJ–Suez	+ 17' 49"
20	Liane Lippert (GER)	Movistar Team	+ 18' 02"
21	Tamara Dronova	Israel Premier Tech Roland	+ 19' 18"
22	Justine Ghekiere (BEL)	AG Insurance–Soudal–Quick-Step	+ 22' 31"
23	Clara Edmond (CAN)	Arkéa Pro Cycling Team	+ 25' 05"
24	Barbara Malcotti (ITA)	Human Powered Health	+ 25' 08"
25	Paula Patiño (COL)	Movistar Team	+ 26' 21"
26	Yara Kastelijn (NED)	Fenix–Deceuninck	+ 26' 42"
27	Coralie Demay (FRA)	St. Michel–Mavic–Auber93	+ 28' 22"
28	Marlen Reusser (SUI)	SD Worx	+ 30' 00"
29	Olivia Baril (CAN)	UAE Team ADQ	+ 32' 39"
30	Natalie Grinczer (GBR)	Lifeplus Wahoo	+ 34' 34"
31	Grace Brown (AUS)	FDJ–Suez	+ 35' 12"
32	Eleonora Camilla Gasparrini (ITA)	UAE Team ADQ	+ 35' 33"
33	Audrey Cordon-Ragot (FRA)	Human Powered Health	+ 36' 54"
34	Simone Boilard (CAN)	St. Michel–Mavic–Auber93	+ 37' 18"
35	Elizabeth Deignan (GBR)	Lidl–Trek	+ 39' 56"
36	Elise Chabbey (SUI)	Canyon//SRAM	+ 40' 14"
37	Léa Curinier (FRA)	Team dsm–firmenich	+ 40' 32"
38	Romy Kasper (GER)	AG Insurance–Soudal–Quick-Step	+ 40' 42"
39	Christina Schweinberger (AUT)	Fenix–Deceuninck	+ 41' 42"
40	Anouska Koster (NED)	Uno-X Pro Cycling Team	+ 42' 23"
41	Alice Maria Arzuffi (ITA)	Ceratizit–WNT Pro Cycling	+ 43' 00"
42	Soraya Paladin (ITA)	Canyon//SRAM	+ 43' 32"
43	Alena Amialiusik	UAE Team ADQ	+ 44' 22"
44	Alice Towers (GBR)	Canyon//SRAM	+ 44' 37"
45	Caroline Andersson (SWE)	Liv Racing TeqFind	+ 45' 13"
46	Silke Smulders (NED)	Liv Racing TeqFind	+ 45' 25"
47	Julia Borgström (SWE)	AG Insurance–Soudal–Quick-Step	+ 45' 55"
48	Esmée Peperkamp (NED)	Team dsm–firmenich	+ 46' 06"
49	Rachel Neylan (AUS)	Cofidis	+ 47' 29"
50	Kathrin Hammes (GER)	EF Education–Tibco–SVB	+ 48' 46"
51	Marta Lach (POL)	Ceratizit–WNT Pro Cycling	+ 49' 28"
52	Lucinda Brand (NED)	Lidl–Trek	+ 50' 23"
53	Elizabeth Stannard (AUS)	Israel Premier Tech Roland	+ 51' 16"
54	Agnieszka Skalniak-Sójka (POL)	Canyon//SRAM	+ 51' 18"
55	Maaike Coljé (NED)	Arkéa Pro Cycling Team	+ 53' 45"
56	Quinty Ton (NED)	Liv Racing TeqFind	+ 54' 27"
57	Julie Van de Velde (BEL)	Fenix–Deceuninck	+ 54' 36"
58	Georgia Williams (NZL)	EF Education–Tibco–SVB	+ 54' 59"
59	Elizabeth Holden (GBR)	UAE Team ADQ	+ 55' 02"
60	Christine Majerus (LUX)	SD Worx	+ 55' 18"
61	Pfeiffer Georgi (GBR)	Team dsm–firmenich	+ 55' 35"
62	Letizia Borghesi (ITA)	EF Education–Tibco–SVB	+ 55' 37"
63	Mischa Bredewold (NED)	SD Worx	+ 55' 56"
64	Dilyxine Miermont (FRA)	St. Michel–Mavic–Auber93	+ 56' 40"
65	Floortje Mackaij (NED)	Movistar Team	+ 57' 04"
66	Thalita de Jong (NED)	Liv Racing TeqFind	+ 57' 13"
67	Jade Wiel (FRA)	FDJ–Suez	+ 57' 37"
68	Anna Henderson (GBR)	Team Jumbo–Visma	+ 58' 07"
69	Sigrid Ytterhus Haugset (NOR)	Team Coop–Hitec Products	+ 59' 34"
70	Emma Norsgaard (DEN)	Movistar Team	+ 1h 00' 24"
71	Hannah Ludwig (GER)	Uno-X Pro Cycling Team	+ 1h 00' 53"
72	Amber Pate (AUS)	Team Jayco–AlUla	+ 1h 01' 08"
73	Marthe Truyen (BEL)	Fenix–Deceuninck	+ 1h 02' 06"
74	Morgane Coston (FRA)	Cofidis	+ 1h 02' 12"
75	Alexandra Manly (AUS)	Team Jayco–AlUla	+ 1h 02' 46"
76	Karlijn Swinkels (NED)	Team Jumbo–Visma	+ 1h 03' 21"
77	Danielle de Francesco (AUS)	Arkéa Pro Cycling Team	+ 1h 05' 26"
78	Eri Yonamine (JPN)	Human Powered Health	+ 1h 05' 40"
79	Elena Hartmann (SUI)	Israel Premier Tech Roland	+ 1h 06' 46"
80	Sara Poidevin (CAN)	EF Education–Tibco–SVB	+ 1h 08' 41"
81	Margot Pompanon (FRA)	St. Michel–Mavic–Auber93	+ 1h 08' 54"
82	Julie De Wilde (BEL)	Fenix–Deceuninck	+ 1h 10' 07"
83	Nina Berton (LUX)	Ceratizit–WNT Pro Cycling	+ 1h 10' 08"
84	Aude Biannic (FRA)	Movistar Team	+ 1h 10' 27"
85	Sanne Cant (BEL)	Fenix–Deceuninck	+ 1h 11' 49"
86	Camille Fahy (FRA)	St. Michel–Mavic–Auber93	+ 1h 12' 47"
87	Lauretta Hanson (AUS)	Lidl–Trek	+ 1h 12' 50"
88	Célia Le Mouel (FRA)	St. Michel–Mavic–Auber93	+ 1h 13' 38"
89	Sheyla Gutiérrez (ESP)	Movistar Team	+ 1h 15' 53"
90	Sarah Roy (AUS)	Canyon//SRAM	+ 1h 16' 02"
91	Maaike Boogaard (NED)	AG Insurance–Soudal–Quick-Step	+ 1h 19' 20"
92	Sandra Alonso (ESP)	Ceratizit–WNT Pro Cycling	+ 1h 19' 25"
93	Susanne Andersen (NOR)	Uno-X Pro Cycling Team	+ 1h 22' 41"
94	Nina Kessler (NED)	Team Jayco–AlUla	+ 1h 23' 16"
95	Elena Cecchini (ITA)	SD Worx	+ 1h 23' 42"
96	Georgie Howe (AUS)	Team Jayco–AlUla	+ 1h 24' 24"
97	Magdeleine Vallieres (CAN)	EF Education–Tibco–SVB	+ 1h 24' 48"
98	Arianna Fidanza (ITA)	Ceratizit–WNT Pro Cycling	+ 1h 25' 18"
99	Teniel Campbell (TRI)	Team Jayco–AlUla	+ 1h 25' 24"
100	Kathrin Schweinberger (AUT)	Ceratizit–WNT Pro Cycling	+ 1h 25' 40"
101	Jeanne Korevaar (NED)	Liv Racing TeqFind	+ 1h 26' 59"
102	Nathalie Eklund (SWE)	Israel Premier Tech Roland	+ 1h 27' 32"
103	Coryn Labecki (USA)	Team Jumbo–Visma	+ 1h 27' 35"
104	Evy Kuijpers (NED)	Fenix–Deceuninck	+ 1h 29' 25"
105	Henrietta Christie (NZL)	Human Powered Health	+ 1h 29' 28"
106	Wilma Olausson (SWE)	Uno-X Pro Cycling Team	+ 1h 30' 26"
107	Stine Dale (NOR)	Team Coop–Hitec Products	+ 1h 30' 56"
108	Alison Jackson (CAN)	EF Education–Tibco–SVB	+ 1h 31' 50"
109	Ilaria Sanguineti (ITA)	Lidl–Trek	+ 1h 35' 56"
110	Margaux Vigie (FRA)	Lifeplus Wahoo	+ 1h 36' 37"
111	Megan Jastrab (USA)	Team dsm–firmenich	+ 1h 37' 47"
112	Sandrine Bideau (FRA)	St. Michel–Mavic–Auber93	+ 1h 38' 03"
113	Tiril Jørgensen (NOR)	Team Coop–Hitec Products	+ 1h 40' 58"
114	Vittoria Guazzini (ITA)	FDJ–Suez	+ 1h 41' 22"
115	Anastasiya Kolesava	Arkéa Pro Cycling Team	+ 1h 42' 46"
116	April Tacey (GBR)	Lifeplus Wahoo	+ 1h 43' 15"
117	India Grangier (FRA)	Team Coop–Hitec Products	+ 1h 44' 27"
118	Jessica Allen (AUS)	Team Jayco–AlUla	+ 1h 47' 01"
119	Antri Christoforou (CYP)	Human Powered Health	+ 1h 51' 26"
120	Typhaine Laurance (FRA)	Lifeplus Wahoo	+ 1h 51' 49"
121	Josie Nelson (GBR)	Team Coop–Hitec Products	+ 1h 52' 39"
122	Josie Talbot (AUS)	Cofidis	+ 1h 56' 01"
123	Marjolein van 't Geloof (NED)	Human Powered Health	+ 2h 10' 20"

=== Points classification ===
Final points classification (1–10)
Rank	Rider	Team	Points
1	Lotte Kopecky (BEL)	SD Worx	243
2	Ashleigh Moolman (RSA)	AG Insurance–Soudal–Quick-Step	153
3	Demi Vollering (NED)	SD Worx	97
4	Ricarda Bauernfeind (GER)	Canyon//SRAM	81
5	Emma Norsgaard (DEN)	Movistar Team	67
6	Katarzyna Niewiadoma (POL)	Canyon//SRAM	66
7	Liane Lippert (GER)	Movistar Team	64
8	Marlen Reusser (SUI)	SD Worx	61
9	Yara Kastelijn (NED)	Fenix–Deceuninck	60
10	Annemiek van Vleuten (NED)	Movistar Team	59

=== Mountains classification ===
Final mountains classification (1–10)
Rank	Rider	Team	Points
1	Katarzyna Niewiadoma (POL)	Canyon//SRAM	27
2	Yara Kastelijn (NED)	Fenix–Deceuninck	23
3	Demi Vollering (NED)	SD Worx	19
4	Anouska Koster (NED)	Uno-X Pro Cycling Team	19
5	Annemiek van Vleuten (NED)	Movistar Team	18
6	Kathrin Hammes (GER)	EF Education–Tibco–SVB	11
7	Ashleigh Moolman (RSA)	AG Insurance–Soudal–Quick-Step	11
8	Juliette Labous (FRA)	Team dsm–firmenich	10
9	Julie Van de Velde (BEL)	Fenix–Deceuninck	9
10	Agnieszka Skalniak-Sójka (POL)	Canyon//SRAM	8

=== Young rider classification ===
Final young rider classification (1–10)
Rank	Rider	Team	Time
1	Cédrine Kerbaol (FRA)	Ceratizit–WNT Pro Cycling	25h 30' 02"
2	Ella Wyllie (NZL)	Lifeplus Wahoo	+ 3' 08"
3	Eleonora Camilla Gasparrini (ITA)	UAE Team ADQ	+ 23' 06"
4	Léa Curinier (FRA)	Team dsm–firmenich	+ 28' 05"
5	Alice Towers (GBR)	Canyon//SRAM	+ 32' 10"
6	Caroline Andersson (SWE)	Liv Racing TeqFind	+ 32' 46"
7	Silke Smulders (NED)	Liv Racing TeqFind	+ 32' 58"
8	Julia Borgström (SWE)	AG Insurance–Soudal–Quick-Step	+ 33' 28"
9	Julie De Wilde (BEL)	Fenix–Deceuninck	+ 57' 40"
10	Nina Berton (LUX)	Ceratizit–WNT Pro Cycling	+ 57' 41"

=== Team classification ===
Final team classification (1–10)
Rank	Team	Time
1	(Netherlands) SD Worx	76h 17' 38"
2	(Germany) Canyon//SRAM	+ 12' 05"
3	(Spain) Movistar Team	+ 18' 03"
4	(France) FDJ–Suez	+ 19' 40"
5	(United Arab Emirates) UAE Team ADQ	+ 31' 26"
6	(Belgium) AG Insurance–Soudal–Quick-Step	+ 35' 53"
7	(Netherlands) Team Jumbo–Visma	+ 44' 26"
8	(United States) Lidl–Trek	+ 47' 31"
9	(Netherlands) Team dsm–firmenich	+ 50' 20"
10	(Switzerland) Israel Premier Tech Roland	+ 57' 29"

== Reception ==
Media coverage following the event praised the television viewership, large crowds and the course design (including mountain stages), while others expressed concern regarding awareness of key contenders by the general public, and the disparity in prize money. L'Équipe called the Tourmalet stage "a key moment in the evolution of women's cycling". Cycling News noted that the French public made "no distinction ... between the men's and women's race", referring to both races as the Tour de France. Les Dernières Nouvelles d'Alsace stated that the race was "met with real popular success", and race director Marion Rousse stated that the 2023 edition "was the year of confirmation: we had to prove that the first edition was not just curiosity".

Cycling News noted that the "logical next step" for the race would be to visit the Alps, noting that the race organisers ASO seemed "keen to include at least one very famous climb" in each edition of the race following La Planche des Belles Filles in 2022 and the Col du Tourmalet in 2023. Subsequently, the 2024 edition of the race visited the Alps, with a summit finish on Alpe d'Huez.

== Broadcasting ==
As with the 2022 edition, live television coverage was provided by France Télévisions in conjunction with the European Broadcasting Union. French television coverage moved to the higher profile France 2 channel owing to the high viewership of the 2022 edition. At least two and a half hours of each stage were broadcast, with the first and last stages shown from start to finish.

Following the event, broadcasters reported high viewing figures. In France, France 2 reported an average of 2 million viewers over the eight stages (a 25% audience share), and a peak of 4.3 million viewers watching stage 7 on the Col du Tourmalet (a 34.6% audience share). In Belgium, Sporza reported an average of around 393,000 viewers (a 55% audience share), with a peak of over 695,000 viewers on stage 7. In the Netherlands, NOS reported an average of 627,000 viewers over the eight stages, with a peak of 2.5 million on stage 7 (a 42% audience share).
