= 2025 Women's Tour Down Under =

2025 UCI Women's World Tour, race 1 of 27

Race details
- Dates: 17–19 January 2025
- Stages: 3
- Distance: 322.8 km (200.6 mi)
- Winning time: 8h 49' 00"

Results
Jersey awarded to the overall winner	Winner	Noemi Rüegg (SUI)	(EF Education–Oatly)
	Second	Silke Smulders (NED)	(Liv AlUla Jayco)
	Third	Mie Bjørndal Ottestad (NOR)	(Uno-X Mobility)
Jersey awarded to the mountains classification winner	Mountains	Alyssa Polites (AUS)	(Australia)
Jersey awarded to the young rider classification winner	Young rider	Eleonora Ciabocco (ITA)	(Team Picnic–PostNL)
Jersey awarded to the sprints classification winner	Sprints	Noemi Rüegg (SUI)	(EF Education–Oatly)
	Team	(United Arab Emirates) UAE Team ADQ	

The 2025 Women's Tour Down Under (officially Santos Women's Tour Down Under 2025 for sponsorship reasons) was the 8th edition of the Women's Tour Down Under, which is the part of the 2025 UCI Women's World Tour. It began on 17 January in Brighton and finished on 19 January in Stirling.

The race was won by Swiss rider Noemi Rüegg of EF Education–Oatly.

== Teams ==
Ten UCI Women's WorldTeams, two UCI Women's ProTeams, one UCI Women's Continental Team and one national team made up the fourteen teams that took part in the race.

UCI Women's WorldTeams

- AG Insurance–Soudal
- Canyon//SRAM Zondacrypto
- Ceratizit Pro Cycling
- FDJ–Suez
- Human Powered Health
- Lidl–Trek
- Liv AlUla Jayco
- Team Picnic–PostNL
- UAE Team ADQ
- Uno-X Mobility

UCI Women's ProTeams

- EF Education–Oatly
- St. Michel–Preference Home–Auber93

UCI Women's Continental Teams

- Team Coop–Repsol

National teams

- Australia

== Route ==
Stage characteristics and winners
Stage	Date	Course	Distance	Type	Stage winner
1	17 January	Brighton to Snapper Point	101.9 km (63.3 mi)	Hilly stage	Daniek Hengeveld (NED)
2	18 January	Unley to Willunga Hill	115 km (71 mi)	Hilly stage	Noemi Rüegg (SUI)
3	19 January	Stirling to Stirling	105.9 km (65.8 mi)	Hilly stage	Chloé Dygert (USA)
Total			322.8 km (200.6 mi)		

== Stages ==
=== Stage 1 ===
17 January — Brighton to Snapper Point, 101.9 km (63.3 mi)

Stage 1 Result
Rank	Rider	Team	Time
1	Daniek Hengeveld (NED)	Ceratizit Pro Cycling	2h 45' 06"
2	Ally Wollaston (NZL)	FDJ–Suez	+ 36"
3	Kathrin Schweinberger (AUT)	Human Powered Health	+ 36"
4	Sarah Van Dam (CAN)	Ceratizit Pro Cycling	+ 36"
5	Rachele Barbieri (ITA)	Team Picnic–PostNL	+ 36"
6	Noemi Rüegg (SUI)	EF Education–Oatly	+ 36"
7	Maike van der Duin (NED)	Canyon//SRAM Zondacrypto	+ 36"
8	Clara Copponi (FRA)	Lidl–Trek	+ 36"
9	India Grangier (FRA)	Team Coop–Repsol	+ 36"
10	Lucie Fityus (AUS)	St. Michel–Preference Home–Auber93	+ 36"

General classification after Stage 1
Rank	Rider	Team	Time
1	Daniek Hengeveld (NED)	Ceratizit Pro Cycling	2h 44' 53"
2	Ally Wollaston (NZL)	FDJ–Suez	+ 43"
3	Kathrin Schweinberger (AUT)	Human Powered Health	+ 45"
4	Karlijn Swinkels (NED)	UAE Team ADQ	+ 45"
5	Alyssa Polites (AUS)	Australia	+ 46"
6	Noemi Rüegg (SUI)	EF Education–Oatly	+ 48"
7	Dominika Włodarczyk (POL)	UAE Team ADQ	+ 48"
8	Sarah Van Dam (CAN)	Ceratizit Pro Cycling	+ 49"
9	Rachele Barbieri (ITA)	Team Picnic–PostNL	+ 49"
10	Maike van der Duin (NED)	Canyon//SRAM Zondacrypto	+ 49"

=== Stage 2 ===
18 January — Unley to Willunga Hill, 115 km (71 mi)

Stage 2 Result
Rank	Rider	Team	Time
1	Noemi Rüegg (SUI)	EF Education–Oatly	3h 10' 03"
2	Silke Smulders (NED)	Liv AlUla Jayco	+ 10"
3	Mie Bjørndal Ottestad (NOR)	Uno-X Mobility	+ 26"
4	Neve Bradbury (AUS)	Canyon//SRAM Zondacrypto	+ 26"
5	Dominika Włodarczyk (POL)	UAE Team ADQ	+ 26"
6	Justine Ghekiere (BEL)	AG Insurance–Soudal	+ 26"
7	Elise Chabbey (SUI)	FDJ–Suez	+ 26"
8	Amanda Spratt (AUS)	Lidl–Trek	+ 29"
9	Niamh Fisher-Black (NZL)	Lidl–Trek	+ 35"
10	Julie Van de Velde (BEL)	AG Insurance–Soudal	+ 39"

General classification after Stage 2
Rank	Rider	Team	Time
1	Noemi Rüegg (SUI)	EF Education–Oatly	5h 55' 34"
2	Silke Smulders (NED)	Liv AlUla Jayco	+ 15"
3	Mie Bjørndal Ottestad (NOR)	Uno-X Mobility	+ 33"
4	Dominika Włodarczyk (POL)	UAE Team ADQ	+ 36"
5	Justine Ghekiere (BEL)	AG Insurance–Soudal	+ 37"
6	Neve Bradbury (AUS)	Canyon//SRAM Zondacrypto	+ 37"
7	Elise Chabbey (SUI)	FDJ–Suez	+ 37"
8	Amanda Spratt (AUS)	Lidl–Trek	+ 40"
9	Niamh Fisher-Black (NZL)	Lidl–Trek	+ 46"
10	Julie Van de Velde (BEL)	AG Insurance–Soudal	+ 50"

=== Stage 3 ===
19 January — Stirling to Stirling, 105.9 km (65.8 mi)

Stage 3 Result
Rank	Rider	Team	Time
1	Chloé Dygert (USA)	Canyon//SRAM Zondacrypto	2h 53' 29"
2	Silke Smulders (NED)	Liv AlUla Jayco	+ 1"
3	Noemi Rüegg (SUI)	EF Education–Oatly	+ 1"
4	Ruth Edwards (USA)	Human Powered Health	+ 1"
5	Sarah Van Dam (CAN)	Ceratizit Pro Cycling	+ 1"
6	Elise Chabbey (SUI)	FDJ–Suez	+ 1"
7	Alexandra Manly (AUS)	AG Insurance–Soudal	+ 1"
8	Dominika Włodarczyk (POL)	UAE Team ADQ	+ 1"
9	Justine Ghekiere (BEL)	AG Insurance–Soudal	+ 1"
10	Josie Nelson (GBR)	Team Picnic–PostNL	+ 1"

General classification after Stage 3
Rank	Rider	Team	Time
1	Noemi Rüegg (SUI)	EF Education–Oatly	8h 49' 00"
2	Silke Smulders (NED)	Liv AlUla Jayco	+ 13"
3	Mie Bjørndal Ottestad (NOR)	Uno-X Mobility	+ 37"
4	Dominika Włodarczyk (POL)	UAE Team ADQ	+ 40"
5	Elise Chabbey (SUI)	FDJ–Suez	+ 40"
6	Justine Ghekiere (BEL)	AG Insurance–Soudal	+ 41"
7	Amanda Spratt (AUS)	Lidl–Trek	+ 49"
8	Neve Bradbury (AUS)	Canyon//SRAM Zondacrypto	+ 56"
9	Ruth Edwards (USA)	Human Powered Health	+ 59"
10	Alice Towers (GBR)	Canyon//SRAM Zondacrypto	+ 1' 02"

== Classification leadership table ==
Classification leadership by stage
Stage	Winner	General classification	Sprints classification	Mountains classification	Young rider classification	Most competitive rider	Team classification
1	Daniek Hengeveld	Daniek Hengeveld	Daniek Hengeveld	Alyssa Polites	Alyssa Polites	Alyssa Polites	Ceratizit Pro Cycling
2	Noemi Rüegg	Noemi Rüegg	Noemi Rüegg	Dominika Włodarczyk	Eleonora Ciabocco	Alli Anderson	UAE Team ADQ
3	Chloé Dygert	Noemi Rüegg	Noemi Rüegg	Alyssa Polites	Eleonora Ciabocco	Ella Simpson	UAE Team ADQ
Final		Noemi Rüegg	Noemi Rüegg	Alyssa Polites	Eleonora Ciabocco	Not awarded	UAE Team ADQ

== Classification standings ==
Legend
Denotes the leader of the general classification	Denotes the leader of the sprints classification
Denotes the leader of the mountains classification	Denotes the leader of the young rider classification
Denotes the winner of the combativity award	

=== General classification ===
Final general classification (1–10)
Rank	Rider	Team	Time
1	Noemi Rüegg (SUI)	EF Education–Oatly	8h 49' 00"
2	Silke Smulders (NED)	Liv AlUla Jayco	+ 13"
3	Mie Bjørndal Ottestad (NOR)	Uno-X Mobility	+ 37"
4	Dominika Włodarczyk (POL)	UAE Team ADQ	+ 40"
5	Elise Chabbey (SUI)	FDJ–Suez	+ 40"
6	Justine Ghekiere (BEL)	AG Insurance–Soudal	+ 41"
7	Amanda Spratt (AUS)	Lidl–Trek	+ 49"
8	Neve Bradbury (AUS)	Canyon//SRAM Zondacrypto	+ 56"
9	Ruth Edwards (USA)	Human Powered Health	+ 59"
10	Alice Towers (GBR)	Canyon//SRAM Zondacrypto	+ 1' 02"

=== Sprints classification ===
Final sprints classification (1–10)
Rank	Rider	Team	Points
1	Noemi Rüegg (SUI)	EF Education–Oatly	58
2	Silke Smulders (NED)	Liv AlUla Jayco	42
3	Sarah Van Dam (CAN)	Ceratizit Pro Cycling	38
4	Daniek Hengeveld (NED)	Ceratizit Pro Cycling	33
5	Chloé Dygert (USA)	Canyon//SRAM Zondacrypto	32
6	Ally Wollaston (NZL)	FDJ–Suez	28
7	Mie Bjørndal Ottestad (NOR)	Uno-X Mobility	25
8	Elise Chabbey (SUI)	FDJ–Suez	25
9	Dominika Włodarczyk (POL)	UAE Team ADQ	23
10	Ruth Edwards (USA)	Human Powered Health	23

=== Mountains classification ===
Final mountains classification (1–10)
Rank	Rider	Team	Points
1	Alyssa Polites (AUS)	Australia	24
2	Dominika Włodarczyk (POL)	UAE Team ADQ	22
3	Noemi Rüegg (SUI)	EF Education–Oatly	14
4	Niamh Fisher-Black (NZL)	Lidl–Trek	12
5	Karlijn Swinkels (NED)	UAE Team ADQ	7
6	Julie Van de Velde (BEL)	AG Insurance–Soudal	7
7	Clara Copponi (FRA)	Lidl–Trek	7
8	Silke Smulders (NED)	Liv AlUla Jayco	6
9	Barbara Malcotti (ITA)	Human Powered Health	6
10	Sofia Bertizzolo (ITA)	UAE Team ADQ	5

=== Young rider classification ===
Final young rider classification (1–8)
Rank	Rider	Team	Time
1	Eleonora Ciabocco (ITA)	Team Picnic–PostNL	8h 50' 36"
2	Emily Dixon (AUS)	Australia	+ 1' 08"
3	Alyssa Polites (AUS)	Australia	+ 6' 57"
4	Alberte Greve (DEN)	Uno-X Mobility	+ 15' 41"
5	Alli Anderson (AUS)	Australia	+ 19' 43"
6	Sara Fiorin (ITA)	Ceratizit Pro Cycling	+ 26' 45"
7	Felicity Wilson-Haffenden (AUS)	Lidl–Trek	+ 30' 12"
8	Lauren Bates (AUS)	Australia	+ 36' 12"

=== Teams classification ===
Final team classification (1–10)
Rank	Team	Time
1	(United Arab Emirates) UAE Team ADQ	26h 31' 03"
2	(Australia) Liv AlUla Jayco	+ 1' 01"
3	(Germany) Canyon//SRAM Zondacrypto	+ 1' 32"
4	(Belgium) AG Insurance–Soudal	+ 4' 07"
5	(Norway) Team Coop–Repsol	+ 4' 46"
6	(France) FDJ–Suez	+ 6' 57"
7	(Netherlands) Team Picnic–PostNL	+ 10' 01"
8	(Germany) Ceratizit Pro Cycling	+ 10' 08"
9	(United States) Human Powered Health	+ 11' 47"
10	(United States) Lidl–Trek	+ 16' 42"
