= 2024 La Vuelta Femenina =

Women's cycling race in Spain

2024 UCI Women's World Tour, race 15 of 27

Race details
- Dates: 28 April – 5 May
- Stages: 8
- Distance: 867 km (538.7 mi)
- Winning time: 23h 30' 55"

Results
Jersey awarded to the overall winner	Winner	Demi Vollering (NED)	(Team SD Worx–Protime)
	Second	Riejanne Markus (NED)	(Visma–Lease a Bike)
	Third	Elisa Longo Borghini (ITA)	(Lidl–Trek)
Jersey awarded to the points classification winner	Points	Marianne Vos (NED)	(Visma–Lease a Bike)
Jersey awarded to the mountains classification winner	Mountains	Demi Vollering (NED)	(Team SD Worx–Protime)
Jersey awarded to the team classification winner	Team	(Netherlands) Team SD Worx–Protime	

The 2024 La Vuelta Femenina (officially La Vuelta Femenina by Carrefour.es) was the second edition of La Vuelta Femenina, a cycling stage race which takes place in Spain. The race took place from 28 April to 5 May, and was the 15th event in the 2024 UCI Women's World Tour.

The general classification was won by Dutch rider Demi Vollering of Team SD Worx–Protime, with Riejanne Markus of Visma–Lease a Bike in second place nearly two minutes behind. Third place was taken by Elisa Longo Borghini of Lidl–Trek, with Longo Borghini taking the overall lead in the UCI Women's World Tour standings.

The mountains classification was also won by Vollering, with SD Worx–Protime also winning the team classification. The points classification was won by Marianne Vos of Visma–Lease a Bike for the second year in succession.

== Teams ==
Thirteen UCI Women's WorldTeams and eight UCI Women's Continental Teams participated in the race.

UCI Women's WorldTeams

- AG Insurance–Soudal
- Canyon–SRAM
- FDJ–Suez
- Fenix–Deceuninck
- Human Powered Health
- Lidl–Trek
- Liv AlUla Jayco
- Movistar Team
- Roland
- Team DSM–Firmenich PostNL
- Team SD Worx–Protime
- Visma–Lease a Bike
- UAE Team ADQ

UCI Women's Continental Teams

- Bepink–Bongioanni
- EF Education–Cannondale
- Eneicat–CMTeam
- Laboral Kutxa–Fundación Euskadi
- Lotto–Dstny Ladies
- Team Coop–Repsol
- VolkerWessels Women Cyclingteam
- Winspace

== Route ==
The route was announced in March 2024, with the race extended to 8 stages in length. The route was considered to be much more difficult than the 2023 edition – with three mountain top finishes in two mountain ranges (Pyrenees and Sierra de Guadarrama), and around 126 km (78 mi) longer. The first rider to the top of the Valdesquí climb on the final stage was awarded the Cima Estela Domínguez, honouring the Spanish rider who was killed while training in 2023.

Stage characteristics
Stage	Date	Course	Distance	Type	Winner
1	28 April	Valencia	16 km (9.9 mi)	Team time trial	(United States) Lidl–Trek
2	29 April	Buñol to Moncofa	118 km (73 mi)	Hilly stage	Alison Jackson (CAN)
3	30 April	Lucena to Teruel	131 km (81 mi)	Medium-mountain stage	Marianne Vos (NED)
4	1 May	Molina de Aragón to Zaragoza	142 km (88 mi)	Flat stage	Kristen Faulkner (USA)
5	2 May	Huesca to Jaca	113 km (70 mi)	Mountain stage	Demi Vollering (NED)
6	3 May	Tarazona to La Laguna Negra	132 km (82 mi)	Mountain stage	Évita Muzic (FRA)
7	4 May	San Esteban de Gormaz to Sigüenza	126 km (78 mi)	Hilly stage	Marianne Vos (NED)
8	5 May	Distrito Telefónica to Valdesquí	89 km (55 mi)	Mountain stage	Demi Vollering (NED)
Total			867 km (539 mi)		

== Classification leadership table ==
Stage	Winner	General classification	Points classification	Mountains classification	Team classification	Combativity award
1	Lidl–Trek	Gaia Realini	not awarded	not awarded	Lidl–Trek	not awarded
2	Alison Jackson	Blanka Vas	Alison Jackson	Karlijn Swinkels	Lidl–Trek	Idoia Eraso
3	Marianne Vos	Blanka Vas	Blanka Vas	Karlijn Swinkels	Lidl–Trek	Mireia Benito
4	Kristen Faulkner	Marianne Vos	Blanka Vas	Karlijn Swinkels	Team SD Worx–Protime	Marlen Reusser
5	Demi Vollering	Demi Vollering	Marianne Vos	Karlijn Swinkels	Team SD Worx–Protime	Lourdes Oyarbide
6	Évita Muzic	Demi Vollering	Marianne Vos	Karlijn Swinkels	Team SD Worx–Protime	Claudia San Justo
7	Marianne Vos	Demi Vollering	Marianne Vos	Karlijn Swinkels	Team SD Worx–Protime	Anya Louw
8	Demi Vollering	Demi Vollering	Marianne Vos	Demi Vollering	Team SD Worx–Protime	Mireia Benito
Final		Demi Vollering	Marianne Vos	Demi Vollering	Team SD Worx–Protime	not awarded

== Classification standings ==
Legend
Denotes the winner of the general classification	Denotes the winner of the team classification
Denotes the winner of the points classification	Denotes the winner of the combativity award
Denotes the winner of the mountains classification	

=== General classification ===
Final general classification (1–10)
Rank	Rider	Team	Time
1	Demi Vollering (NED)	Team SD Worx–Protime	23h 30' 55"
2	Riejanne Markus (NED)	Visma–Lease a Bike	+ 1' 49"
3	Elisa Longo Borghini (ITA)	Lidl–Trek	+ 2' 00"
4	Juliette Labous (FRA)	Team DSM–Firmenich PostNL	+ 2' 58"
5	Évita Muzic (FRA)	FDJ–Suez	+ 3' 15"
6	Ricarda Bauernfeind (GER)	Canyon–SRAM	+ 4' 33"
7	Niamh Fisher-Black (NZL)	Team SD Worx–Protime	+ 5' 14"
8	Yara Kastelijn (NED)	Fenix–Deceuninck	+ 5' 27"
9	Pauliena Rooijakkers (NED)	Fenix–Deceuninck	+ 5' 42"
10	Kim Cadzow (NZL)	EF Education–Cannondale	+ 6' 19"

=== Points classification ===
Final points classification (1–10)
Rank	Rider	Team	Points
1	Marianne Vos (NED)	Visma–Lease a Bike	190
2	Demi Vollering (NED)	Team SD Worx–Protime	148
3	Riejanne Markus (NED)	Visma–Lease a Bike	134
4	Évita Muzic (FRA)	FDJ–Suez	108
5	Elisa Longo Borghini (ITA)	Lidl–Trek	107
6	Blanka Vas (HUN)	Team SD Worx–Protime	104
7	Kristen Faulkner (USA)	EF Education–Cannondale	94
8	Juliette Labous (FRA)	Team DSM–Firmenich PostNL	71
9	Karlijn Swinkels (NED)	UAE Team ADQ	70
10	Alison Jackson (CAN)	EF Education–Cannondale	62

=== Mountains classification ===
Final mountains classification (1–10)
Rank	Rider	Team	Points
1	Demi Vollering (NED)	Team SD Worx–Protime	46
2	Évita Muzic (FRA)	FDJ–Suez	43
3	Yara Kastelijn (NED)	Fenix–Deceuninck	26
4	Karlijn Swinkels (NED)	UAE Team ADQ	20
5	Riejanne Markus (NED)	Visma–Lease a Bike	16
6	Pauliena Rooijakkers (NED)	Fenix–Deceuninck	12
7	Ricarda Bauernfeind (GER)	Canyon–SRAM	11
8	Elisa Longo Borghini (ITA)	Lidl–Trek	10
9	Niamh Fisher-Black (NZL)	Team SD Worx–Protime	8
10	Antonia Niedermaier (GER)	Canyon–SRAM	8

=== Team classification ===
Final team classification (1–10)
Rank	Team	Time
1	(Netherlands) Team SD Worx–Protime	70h 06' 44"
2	(Belgium) Fenix–Deceuninck	+ 13' 40"
3	(United States) EF Education–Cannondale	+ 21' 25"
4	(Australia) Liv AlUla Jayco	+ 27' 06"
5	(United States) Lidl–Trek	+ 31' 29"
6	(Netherlands) Visma–Lease a Bike	+ 31' 57"
7	(France) FDJ–Suez	+ 33' 20"
8	(United Arab Emirates) UAE Team ADQ	+ 38' 18"
9	(Germany) Canyon–SRAM	+ 41' 34"
10	(Netherlands) Team DSM–Firmenich PostNL	+ 48' 52"
