= Murder of Michelle Leng =

2016 murder in Campsie, Sydney, Australia

Michelle Leng
- 冷梦梅
- Born: Leng Mengmei c. 1991
- Died: 22 April 2016; Campsie, Sydney, New South Wales, Australia
- Cause of death: Stabbing
- Other name: Mengmei Leng
- Education: University of Technology Sydney
- Occupation: Student
- Parent: Mei Zhang (mother)

On 22 April 2016, at Campsie in Sydney, New South Wales, 25-year-old Chinese student Michelle Leng was bound, gagged and murdered by her uncle Derek Barrett, after he detained her inside the family home while his wife was away on a work trip. Barrett photographed Leng while she was restrained before fatally stabbing her multiple times. Two days later, he wrapped her body in plastic, drove it to Snapper Point on the New South Wales Central Coast and disposed of it in a coastal blowhole, where it was discovered by tourists on 24 April.

Leng was originally from Chengdu, China, had moved to Australia in 2011 to study and lived with her aunt's family in Campsie while attending the University of Technology Sydney and later the Sydney Institute of Interpreting and Translation. During the investigation, detectives recovered photographs and videos from Barrett's electronic devices showing that he had secretly filmed Leng over an extended period and had recorded images of her while she was bound. Police also uncovered evidence that Barrett had secretly filmed Leng and his stepdaughter in the bathroom and committed other sexual offences before the killing.

Barrett was arrested on 29 April 2016 and charged with murder before later facing numerous additional offences relating to sexual assault, unlawful detention and secretly recording Leng without her consent. In August 2017, he pleaded guilty to murder and several related offences. During sentencing, Justice Helen Wilson described the killing as "a despicable crime of extreme brutality and great wickedness" motivated by Barrett's "perverted sexual obsession" with the victim. He was sentenced to 46 years' imprisonment with a non-parole period of 34 years and six months.

== Background ==
=== Michelle Leng ===
Michelle Leng (Note: "Michelle" was an English name used by Leng while studying in Australia.) (simplified Chinese: 冷梦梅; traditional Chinese: 冷夢梅; pinyin: Lěng Mèngméi), also known by her Chinese name Mengmei Leng, was born in Chengdu, Sichuan, China. She moved to Australia in 2011 to pursue higher education and lived with her aunt, her aunt's husband Derek Barrett, her cousin, and Barrett's stepdaughter at their home in the Sydney suburb of Campsie. Leng graduated with a bachelor's degree in business from the University of Technology Sydney and later studied at the Sydney Institute of Interpreting and Translation. According to her mother Mei Zhang, Leng had hoped to build a future in Australia after completing her studies. Following the death of Leng's father in the 2008 Sichuan earthquake, mother and daughter developed a particularly close relationship and relied heavily on one another.

On 21 April 2016, Leng spent the afternoon shopping in Sydney's central business district before returning to Campsie by train. CCTV footage later released by police showed her arriving at Campsie railway station carrying shopping bags shortly before she disappeared. Friends told investigators that it was out of character for her to suddenly lose contact, prompting concern when she failed to respond to messages.

=== Derek Barrett ===
At the time of the killing, Derek Barrett was a 27-year-old information technology worker who lived in Campsie with his wife Leng's aunt and his stepdaughter. In the course of the police inquiry, it was revealed that Barrett had developed a sexual obsession with Leng and had been covertly recording her for an extended period of time. Investigators later recovered videos showing Barrett secretly filming Leng while she showered and recording himself committing indecent acts while she slept. Police also found evidence that he had installed hidden recording devices in the family home and had similarly filmed his stepdaughter without consent. During sentencing, New South Wales Supreme Court Justice Helen Wilson found that Barrett's actions were motivated by sexual gratification and described his conduct towards Leng before her death as a grave abuse of the trust she had placed in him as a member of her family.

== Murder ==
On 21 April 2016, Leng was last seen by friends after leaving the University of Technology Sydney and travelling to Sydney's central business district for shopping. CCTV footage showed her walking through Pitt Street Mall and later arriving at Campsie railway station at about 4:30 p.m. carrying shopping bags and a takeaway drink. She continued communicating with friends later that evening, but her phone and social media activity later stopped.

Police later determined that Leng had returned to the Campsie home where she lived with her aunt, uncle and cousin. Investigators alleged that Barrett attacked Leng inside the residence while his wife was away. He bound and gagged Leng before taking photographs of her while she was naked and restrained. The court later heard that Leng was alive during this period and appeared frightened in the images recovered from Barrett's phone. Barrett later stabbed Leng multiple times, killing her at the Campsie residence. Police and prosecutors stated that she had suffered a violent attack, with reports indicating that she had sustained more than 30 stab wounds. After the killing, Barrett wrapped her body in plastic and transported it to the Central Coast, where it was dumped from a cliff into the Snapper Point blowhole at Lake Munmorah on 24 April 2016. Leng's naked body was discovered floating in the blowhole by a tourist at about 10:30 am on 24 April. Police initially released a computer-generated image of the unidentified woman, and her identity was confirmed several days later through DNA testing after her family reported her missing.

During the investigation, police found evidence that Barrett had engaged in sexual misconduct towards Leng before the killing. Investigators recovered photographs and videos from his phone showing that he had secretly recorded Leng and committed other sexual offences against her. Police alleged that Barrett had developed a sexual obsession with Leng and that the murder followed a period in which he detained and assaulted her. The prosecution later presented the killing as a deliberate act rather than one caused by drug use, rejecting Barrett's claim that he could not remember the events because he had consumed methamphetamine and synthetic cannabis. At sentencing in 2017, Justice Helen Wilson described the crime as a "depraved and sadistic act" committed against a person who trusted Barrett and said the offence involved extreme violence, humiliation and terror.

== Discovery and investigation ==
Locations associated with the murder of Mengmei Leng
1 Campsie, Sydney (location of the murder)
2 Snapper Point, Lake Munmorah (location where Leng's body was discovered)

Leng's body was discovered on 24 April 2016 at Snapper Point in the Munmorah State Conservation Area, where emergency services were called at about 10:30 a.m. after her body was found face down in the water inside the blowhole. Police said the body had suffered multiple stab wounds consistent with a violent attack. A post-mortem examination later identified Leng as the missing university student after police compared the unidentified body with information provided by her family. Before her identity was confirmed, police released a computer-generated image of the woman's face in an attempt to identify her. The image led members of the public to suggest that the woman could be Leng, who had been reported missing after failing to return to her Campsie home. Her identity was formally confirmed through DNA testing on 29 April 2016. Investigators examined Leng's final movements before her disappearance. CCTV footage showed her shopping in Sydney's central business district on 21 April, including footage of her travelling through Pitt Street Mall and later arriving at Campsie railway station at approximately 4:30 pm. Police said she had remained in contact with friends until later that evening, after which her phone and social media accounts became inactive.

On 29 April 2016, police arrested Barrett, and charged him with murder. He appeared before Parramatta Local Court via video link, where bail was refused. Police investigations later focused on Barrett's movements after Leng's disappearance. Authorities alleged that his vehicle was captured entering the Munmorah State Conservation Area on the morning her body was discovered. Police also examined evidence linking Barrett to Snapper Point, where Leng's body was found. During the investigation, police recovered photographs and videos from Barrett's electronic devices. These included images showing Leng bound and gagged before her death, as well as recordings connected to other alleged sexual offences. The discovery led investigators to lay additional charges relating to unlawful detention, indecent assault and unauthorised recording offences.

Leng's family travelled from China to Australia following the discovery of her death. Her mother Mei Zhang, said she was devastated by the loss of her daughter and described their relationship as extremely close. Zhang asked for privacy and rejected speculation surrounding her daughter's death that was not supported by evidence. At an early court appearance in May 2016, members of Leng's family and representatives from the Chinese community attended proceedings. A family representative described Leng as a kind person and criticised unfounded rumours that circulated after her death.

== Arrest and trial ==
Derek Barrett
- Status: Incarcerated
- Convictions: Murder; Sexual offences
- Penalty: 46 years' imprisonment (2017); additional sentence for further sexual offences (2021)

Details
- Victims: Michelle Leng
- Date: 22–24 April 2016
- Country: Australia
- State: New South Wales
- Date apprehended: 29 April 2016

Barrett was initially charged with murder in April 2016 and maintained his legal position as the case progressed. In August 2017, he pleaded guilty to murdering Leng, as well as several offences relating to the recording of sexual acts and the treatment of Leng before her death. The court heard that Barrett had detained Leng at their Campsie home, bound and gagged her, and taken photographs of her while she was alive. He also admitted offences involving secret recordings and indecent acts committed against Leng and another family member. During an early court appearance in May 2016, Barrett's solicitor Bill Whitby said his client was "shocked and upset" and was struggling with his time in custody, describing conditions at the Sydney Police Centre as not "particularly attractive".

During sentencing proceedings in December 2017, the New South Wales Supreme Court heard that Barrett claimed he had little memory of the killing because he had used drugs before the offence. Justice Helen Wilson rejected this explanation, finding that Barrett was responsible for his actions and that the murder was motivated by a sexual obsession with Leng. Justice Wilson described the crime as a "depraved and sadistic act" carried out by someone Leng trusted. She said the attack involved extreme violence, humiliation and fear, and that Barrett had abused the trust placed in him as a member of Leng's family.

On 15 December 2017, Barrett was sentenced to 46 years' imprisonment, with a non-parole period of 34 years and 6 months. The sentence meant he would not become eligible for parole until 2050. Leng's family had requested a life sentence, but Barrett received the maximum available sentence under the circumstances of his plea and convictions. Outside court, homicide detective Gary Jubelin said the sentence reflected the seriousness of the crime but described the case as an "extremely" tragic matter for Leng's family. Barrett showed little reaction during sentencing proceedings and remained in custody after the decision.

=== Further offences ===
In 2020, new evidence led to further charges against Barrett after a USB device containing videos and photographs of sexual offences against Leng was discovered. The device was found in the possession of an elderly woman in Strathfield, New South Wales, nearly four years after Leng's murder. The woman had no known connection to Barrett and investigators were unable to determine how the device came into her possession. The USB contained video and image files showing Barrett committing additional sexual offences against Leng shortly before her death. Police compared the files with evidence previously recovered from Barrett's phone and determined that they were connected to the same offences. The discovery resulted in Barrett facing additional charges, including aggravated sexual assault and indecent assault offences.

Barrett appeared before the New South Wales Supreme Court in relation to the additional charges and pleaded guilty to 17 offences. Prosecutors said the offences had not been dealt with during his original sentencing because the evidence was discovered later. During the proceedings, Justice Wilson said the newly discovered material demonstrated that further offending had occurred before Leng's murder. A forensic psychiatrist also told the court that Barrett had shown a lack of empathy and insight into his actions, while disputing Barrett's previous claim that drug use affected his memory of the crime. The additional offences were considered separately from Barrett's original murder conviction, for which he was already serving a 46-year sentence with a non-parole period of 34 years and 6 months.
