= Daniek Hengeveld =

Dutch cyclist (born 2002)

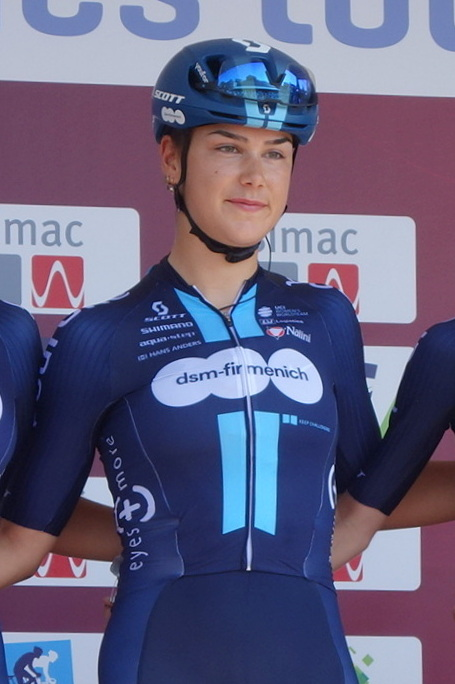
- Hengeveld in 2023

Personal information
- Born: 17 November 2002 (age 23) Nootdorp, Netherlands

Cycling career
- Sport: Cycling
- Current team: Visma–Lease a Bike
- Disciplines: Road; Track
- Role: Rider

Professional teams
- 2021–2022: GT Krush Tunap
- 2023–2024: Team DSM
- 2025: Ceratizit Pro Cycling
- 2026-: Visma–Lease a Bike

Daniek Hengeveld (born 17 November 2002) is a Dutch road and track cyclist, who currently rides for UCI Women's WorldTeam Visma–Lease a Bike.

== Major results ==
=== Track ===
2021
National Championships

1st Individual pursuit
1st Points race
2nd Madison
2nd Elimination race

2022
UEC European Under-23 Championships

2nd Points race
2nd Omnium

=== Road ===
2019
7th Overall Watersley Ladies Challenge
2021
1st Prologue Belgrade GP Woman Tour
10th Drentse Acht van Westerveld
2022
8th Time trial, National Under-23 Championships
10th Drentse Acht van Westerveld
2025
1st Stage 1 Women's Tour Down Under

2026

1st Time Trial, National Championships
