= 2022 UCI Road World Championships – Women's under-23 road race =

Cycling event

Women's under-23 road race
2022 UCI Road World Championships
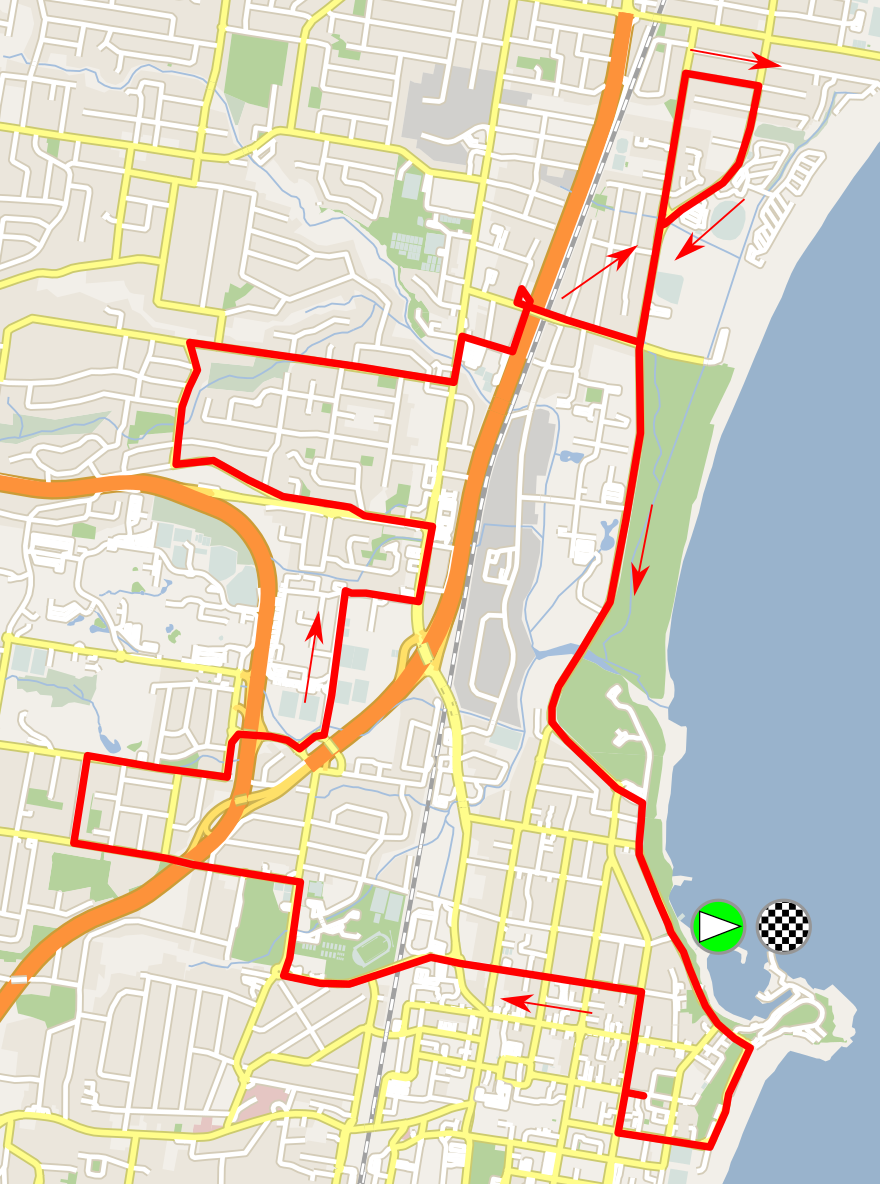

Race details
- Dates: 24 September 2022
- Distance: 164.3 km (102.1 mi)
- Winning time: 4:24.26

Medalists
	Gold	Niamh Fisher-Black (NZL)
	Silver	Pfeiffer Georgi (GBR)
	Bronze	Ricarda Bauernfeind (GER)

The Women's under-23 road race title and rankings of the 2022 UCI Road World Championships were derived from the results of age-qualified participants in the women's elite road race that took place on 24 September 2022 in Wollongong, Australia.

== Final classification ==
Rank	Rider	Time	Behind
1st place, gold medalist(s)	(New Zealand) Niamh Fisher-Black (NZL)	4:24:26	+0:00
2nd place, silver medalist(s)	(United Kingdom) Pfeiffer Georgi (GBR)	4:24:38	+0:12
3rd place, bronze medalist(s)	(Germany) Ricarda Bauernfeind (GER)	4:24:38	+0:12
4	(Canada) Simone Boilard (CAN)	4:24:38	+0:12
5	(United Kingdom) Anna Shackley (GBR)	4:24:38	+0:12
6	(Italy) Silvia Zanardi (ITA)	4:29:22	+4:57
7	(Switzerland) Noemi Rüegg (SUI)	4:29:22	+4:57
8	(Belgium) Julie de Wilde (BEL)	4:29:22	+4:57
9	(Norway) Mari Hole Mohr (NOR)	4:29:22	+4:57
10	(New Zealand) Ella Wyllie (NZL)	4:29:22	+4:57
11	(Poland) Dominika Wlodarczyk (POL)	4:32:02	+7:36
12	(Netherlands) Shirin van Anrooij (NED)	4:32:04	+7:38
13	(France) Marie Le Net (FRA)	4:32:04	+7:38
14	(Norway) Anne Dorthe Ysland (NOR)	4:33.57	+9:31
15	(Poland) Marta Jaskulska (POL)	4:36:32	+12:06
16	(Sweden) Julia Borgström (SWE)	4:36:32	+12:06
17	(Germany) Franziska Koch (GER)	4:10:16	+15:50
18	(Luxembourg) Nina Berton (LUX)	4:10:16	+15:50
	(France) Jade Wiel (FRA)	DNF	
	(Italy) Vittoria Guazzini (ITA)	DNF	
	(United Kingdom) Elynor Bäckstedt (GBR)	DNF	
	(United Kingdom) Alice Towers (GBR)	DNF	
	(Uzbekistan) Yanina Kuskova (UZB)	DNF	
	(Sweden) Caroline Andersson (SWE)	DNF	
	(Slovakia) Nora Jenčušová (SVK)	DNF	
	(Ukraine) Maryna Varenyk (UKR)	DNF	
	(Canada) Magdeleine Vallieres (CAN)	DNF	
	(Spain) Idoia Eraso (ESP)	DNF	
	(New Zealand) Henrietta Christie (NZL)	DNF	
	(Rwanda) Valentine Nzayisenga (RWA)	DNF	
	(Ukraine) Daryna Nahuliak (UKR)	DNF	
	(Denmark) Rebecca Koeerner (DEN)	DNF	
	(Brazil) Ana Vitória Magalhães (BRA)	DNF	
	(Algeria) Nesrine Houili (ALG)	DNF	
	(Eritrea) Danait Tekeste (ERI)	DNF	
	(United Arab Emirates) Safia Al Sayegh (UAE)	DNF	
