= 2022 UCI Road World Championships – Women's under-23 time trial =

Cycling event

Women's under-23 time trial
2022 UCI Road World Championships
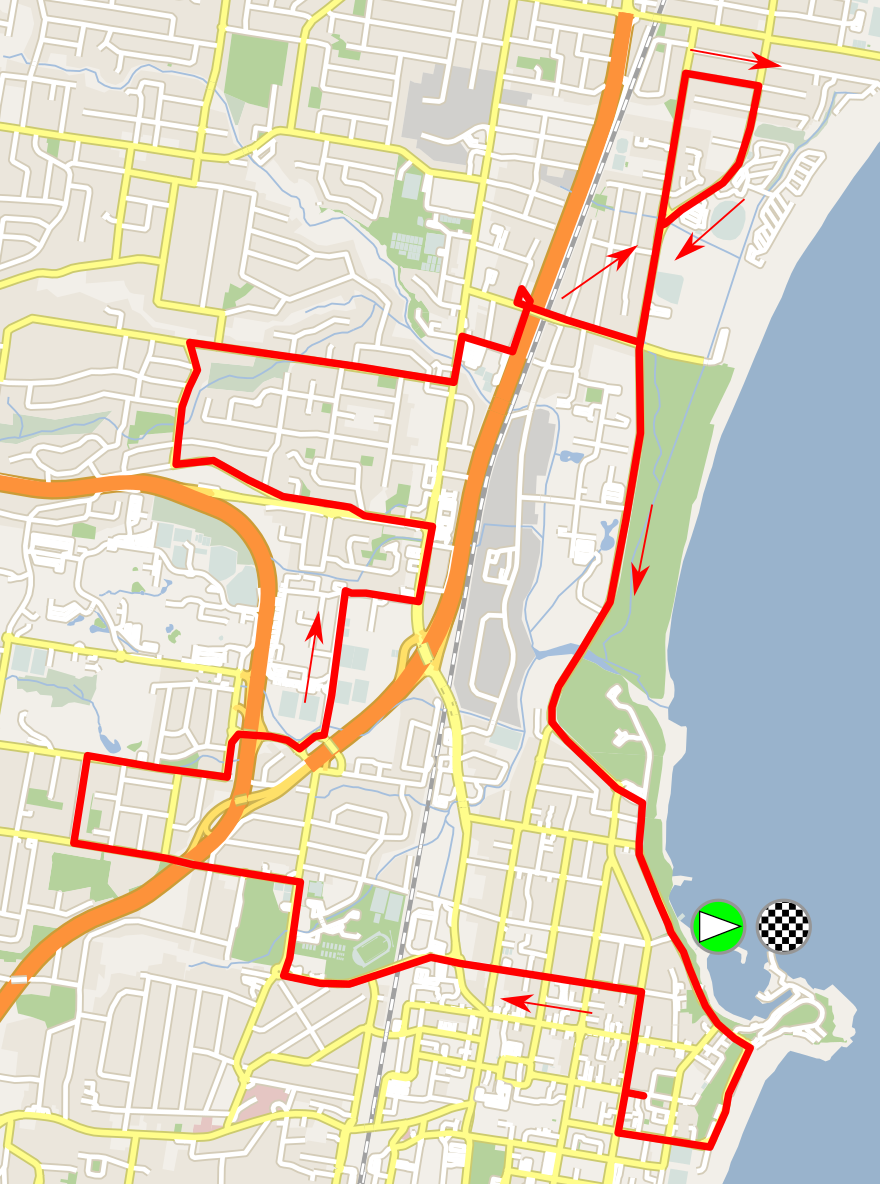

Race details
- Dates: 18 September 2022
- Distance: 34.2 km (21.25 mi)
- Winning time: 45:20.71

Medalists
	Gold	Vittoria Guazzini (ITA)
	Silver	Shirin van Anrooij (NED)
	Bronze	Ricarda Bauernfeind (GER)

The Women's under-23 time trial title and rankings of the 2022 UCI Road World Championships were derived from the results of those born in 2000 or later who took part in the Women's time trial event of that championships, which took place on 18 September 2022 in Wollongong, Australia.

== Final classification ==
Rank	Rider	Time
1st place, gold medalist(s)	(Italy) Vittoria Guazzini (ITA)	45:20.71
2nd place, silver medalist(s)	(Netherlands) Shirin van Anrooij (NED)	47:09.45
3rd place, bronze medalist(s)	(Germany) Ricarda Bauernfeind (GER)	47:38.08
4	(France) Marie Le Net (FRA)	48:03.64
5	(Poland) Marta Jaskulska (POL)	48:09.01
6	(New Zealand) Ella Wyllie (NZL)	49:57.13
7	(Slovakia) Nora Jenčušová (SVK)	52:11.41
8	(Ukraine) Maryna Varenyk (UKR)	53:30.90
9	(Algeria) Nesrine Houili (ALG)	54:43.87
10	(United Arab Emirates) Safia Al-Sayegh (UAE)	58:14.52
	(Chile) Catalina Soto (CHI)	DNF
