= Ricarda Bauernfeind =

German cyclist

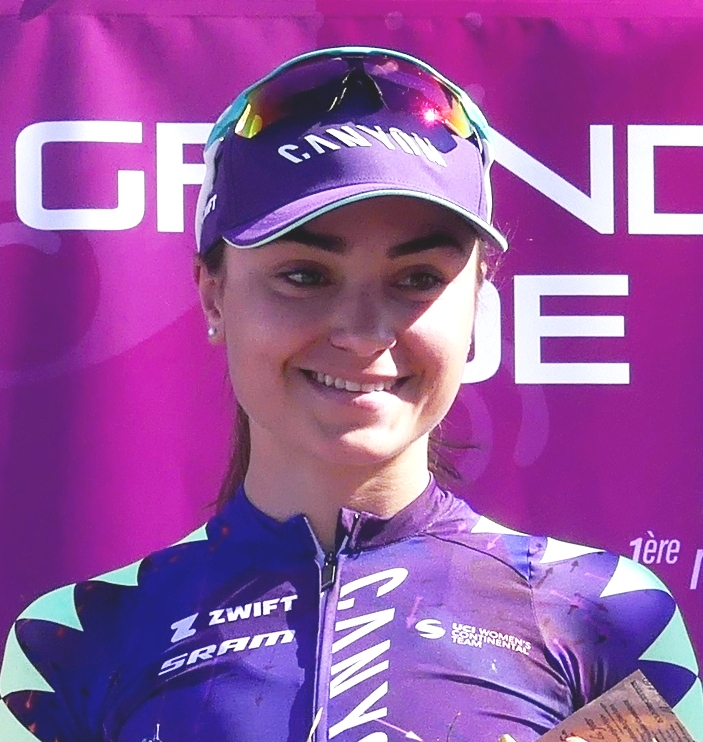
- Bauernfeind in 2022

Personal information
- Born: 1 April 2000 (age 26) Ingolstadt, Germany

Cycling career
- Sport: Cycling
- Current team: Canyon//SRAM
- Discipline: Road
- Role: Rider

Professional teams
- 2022: Canyon–SRAM Generation
- 2023–: Canyon//SRAM

Major wins
- Major Tours Tour de France 1 individual stage (2023)
Medal record
Women's road bicycle racing
Representing Germany
World Championships
Bronze medal – third place	2022 Wollongong	Under-23 road race
Bronze medal – third place	2022 Wollongong	Under-23 time trial
Bronze medal – third place	2023 Glasgow	Mixed team relay

Ricarda Bauernfeind (born 1 April 2000) is a German professional road cyclist, who currently rides for UCI Women's WorldTeam Canyon//SRAM. She won stage five of the 2023 Tour de France Femmes.

== Major results ==
2018
3rd Road race, National Junior Road Championships
2021
3rd Road race, National Road Championships
10th Road race, European Under-23 Road Championships
2022
European Under-23 Road Championships

1st Team relay
5th Time trial

National Under-23 Road Championships

1st Road race
1st Time trial

1st Visegrad 4 Ladies Race Slovakia
2nd Road race, National Road Championships
UCI Under-23 Road World Championships

3rd Road race
3rd Time trial

3rd Overall Tour Féminin International des Pyrénées

1st Young rider classification

3rd Overall Vuelta Ciclista Andalucia Ruta Del Sol
4th Grand Prix Féminin de Chambéry
4th Visegrad 4 Ladies Race Hungary
5th Overall Thüringen Ladies Tour
2023
3rd Team relay, UCI Road World Championships
National Road Championships

4th Road race
5th Time trial

5th Overall La Vuelta Femenina
6th Overall Tour de Romandie Féminin

1st Young rider classification

7th Overall Tour of Scandinavia
9th Overall Tour de France

1st Stage 5
Combativity award Stage 5

2024
6th Overall La Vuelta Femenina
9th Liège–Bastogne–Liège Femmes
2026
10th Overall Itzulia Women
