= Simone Boilard =

Canadian cyclist (born 2000)

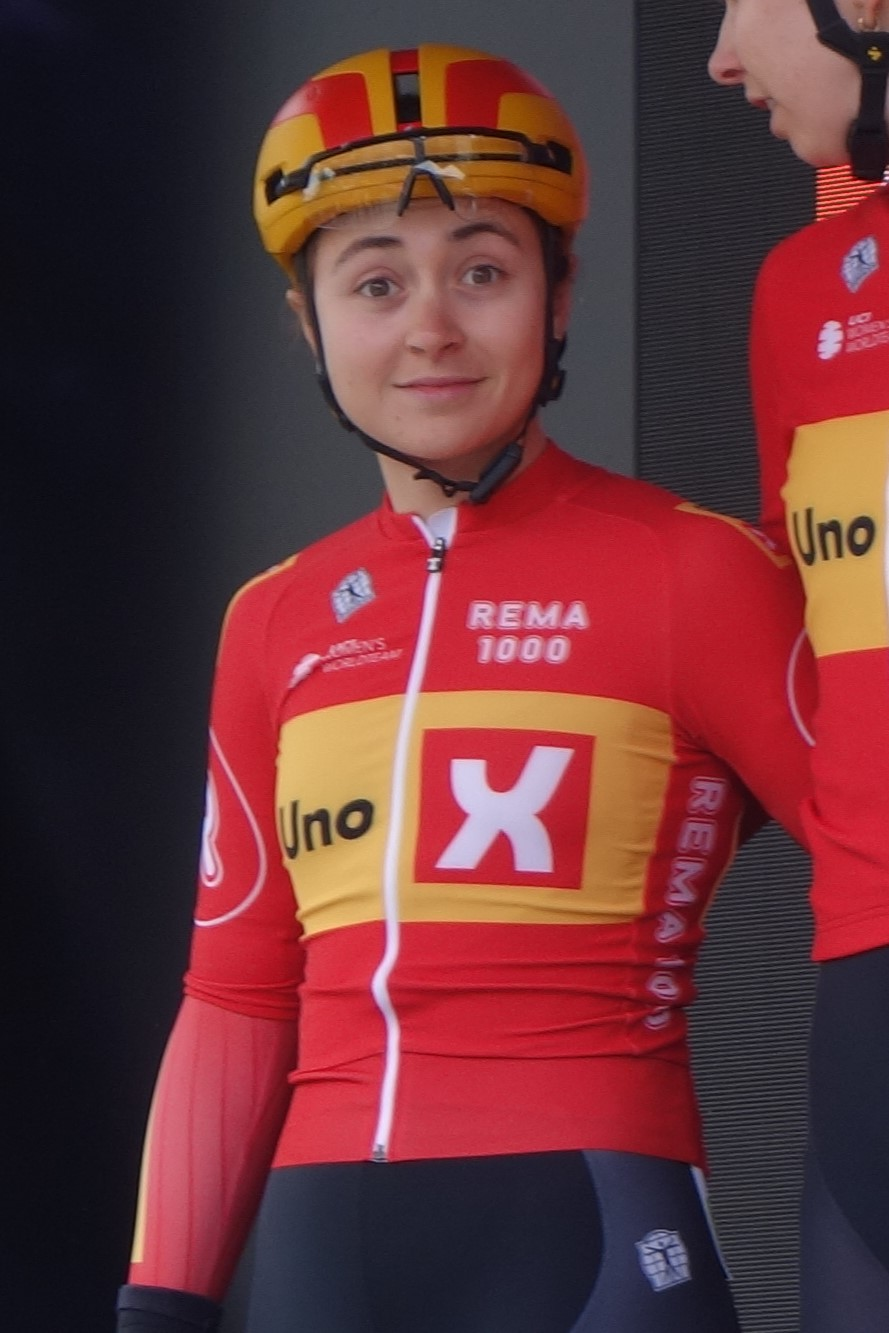
- Boilard in 2024

Personal information
- Born: July 21, 2000 (age 26) Québec, Canada

Cycling career
- Sport: Cycling
- Current team: Uno-X Mobility
- Discipline: Road
- Role: Rider

Amateur team
- 2021: Team Macadam's Cowboys

Professional teams
- 2019: Sho-Air Twenty20
- 2022–2023: St. Michel–Auber93
- 2024–: Uno-X Mobility

Simone Boilard (born July 21, 2000) is a Canadian professional racing cyclist, who currently rides for UCI Women's WorldTeam Uno-X Mobility. She signed to ride for the UCI Women's Team Virginia's Blue Ridge–Twenty28 for the 2019 women's road cycling season.

== Major results ==
2016
National Junior Road Championships

1st Time trial
3rd Road race

2017
3rd Road race, National Junior Road Championships
8th Road race, UCI Junior Road World Championships
2018
1st Time trial, National Junior Road Championships
UCI Junior Road World Championships

3rd Road race
5th Time trial

2022
2nd La Périgord Ladies
3rd Road race, National Road Championships
4th Road race, UCI World Under-23 Championships
4th Overall Tour Cycliste Féminin International de l'Ardèche
4th La Picto-Charentaise
5th Grand Prix Velo Alanya
6th Diamond Tour
6th Kreiz Breizh Elites Dames
7th Road race, Commonwealth Games
8th Ronde de Mouscron
2023
1st GP Oetingen
3rd Grand Prix International d'Isbergues
4th Road race, National Road Championships
7th UCI Gravel World Championships
7th Alpes Grésivaudan Classic
7th À travers les Hauts-de-France
7th Konvert Koerse
8th Ronde de Mouscron
8th La Choralis Fourmies Féminine
10th Cadel Evans Great Ocean Road Race
2024
5th Trofeo Felanitx-Colònia de Sant Jordi
7th Overall Vuelta Ciclista Andalucía Elite Women
8th Trofeo Palma Femina
10th Dwars door het Hageland
