= Snapper Point =

Australian conservation zone known for multiple deaths

Coordinates: 33.1874°S 151.6281°E

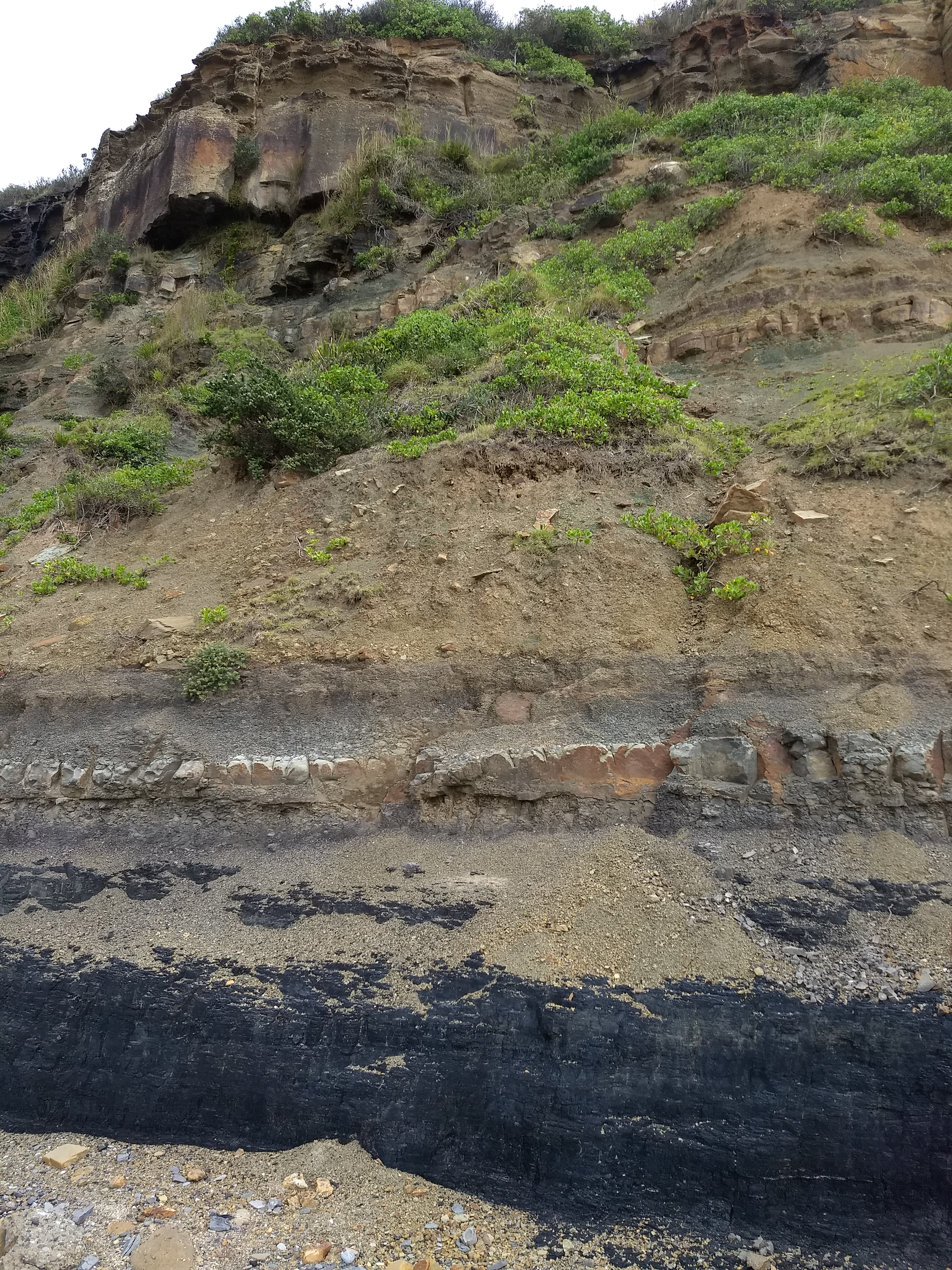
A permian triassic boundary at Frazer Beach.

Snapper Point is an Australian conservation zone a few hundred meters away from Frazer Park beach, located near Catherine Hill Bay, New South Wales. The area around and on Snapper Point consists of steep, jagged volcanic rocks.

== Deaths ==
At least 16 people have been reported as having died at Snapper Point.
