= Silke Smulders =

Dutch bicycle racer

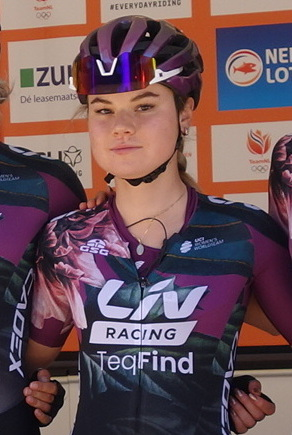
- Smulders in 2023

Personal information
- Born: 1 April 2001 (age 25) Loon op Zand, Netherlands
- Height: 1.63 m (5 ft 4 in)
- Weight: 51 kg (112 lb)

Cycling career
- Sport: Cycling
- Current team: Liv AlUla Jayco
- Discipline: Road
- Role: Rider

Amateur team
- 2020: Watersley Race & Development CT

Professional teams
- 2021: Lotto–Soudal Ladies
- 2022–2023: Liv Racing TeqFind
- 2024–: Liv AlUla Jayco

Silke Smulders (born 1 April 2001) is a Dutch professional racing cyclist, who currently rides for UCI Women's WorldTeam Liv AlUla Jayco.

== Career ==
Smulders competed at the 2020 European Road Championships in the women's under-23 road race where she was the lead-out rider for Lonneke Uneken, who won the silver medal, while Smulders placed 9th. Due to this performance and her result at the 2020 Trophée des Grimpeuses, she earned a professional contract in 2021 with Lotto–Soudal Ladies. That season, she finished 5th in the youth classification of the 2021 Giro Rosa. Smulders moved in 2022 to Liv Racing Xstra. She competed at the 2022 Tour de France Femmes. After the team folded at the end of 2023, she signed with Liv AlUla Jayco in 2024.

Smulders crashed during stage 2 of the 2026 Setmana Ciclista Valenciana, fracturing her lumbar vertebrae. She was forced to abandon the stage, and the race. This comes after an earlier training crash, forcing her to miss the 2026 Women's Tour Down Under.

== Major results ==
2018
6th Overall Watersley Ladies Challenge
2019
9th Overall EPZ Omloop van Borsele
9th Overall Watersley Ladies Challenge
2020
8th Road race, European Under-23 Road Championships
2024
2nd Overall Vuelta Ciclista Andalucía Elite Women

1st Stage 1

7th Overall Simac Ladies Tour
9th GP Oetingen
2025
2nd Overall Women's Tour Down Under
5th Cadel Evans Great Ocean Road Race
