= Valdesquí =

Winter sport area in Sierra de Guadarrama, Spain

Coordinates: 40.799°N 3.9719°W

- Interactive map of Valdesquí
- Location: Sierra de Guadarrama, Spain
- Nearest city: Madrid
- Top elevation: 2,280 m (7,480 ft)
- Base elevation: 1,860 m (6,100 ft)
- Skiable area: 21 km
- Trails: 29
- Lift system: 5 chair lifts. 11 ski tows.
- Website: valdesqui.es

Valdesquí is a ski area situated near the town of Rascafría in the Sierra de Guadarrama near Madrid (Spain). The area is close to the Navacerrada resort (Madrid), and projects have been attempted to link the two areas, stopped by ecologist movements.

== The resort ==
Valdesquí has 21 km of marked pistes, making it one of the biggest ski areas of the Sistema Central chain. The highest point is "La Bola del Mundo" (2280 metres AMSL), with a vertical drop of 400 metres.

The base of the area is situated at 1860 metres AMSL. From there the chair lifts provide access to the different pistes. The resort itself occupies a high mountain valley called "Valle del Noruego." The valley is accessible by car, with a parking and service area at its base from where the lifts depart.

There is also a Cercanías railway line that stops at nearby Cotos. From there shuttle bus services provide access to the resort.

=== Lifts ===
Many of the resort's lifts are modern and high-capacity. The resort features:

- 5 chair lifts
- 11 ski tows

=== Pistes ===
The resort offers 29 pistes of different difficulties:

- 12 beginner pistes
- 14 easy pistes
- 3 intermediate pistes

=== Services ===
- 2 restaurants called 1850 and 2000 referring to the height where they are situated
- 1 skiing school
- 1 snow gardens for children
- 1 kindergarten
- 1 ski hiring store
