= 2019 The Women's Tour =

2019 UCI Women's World Tour, race 13 of 23
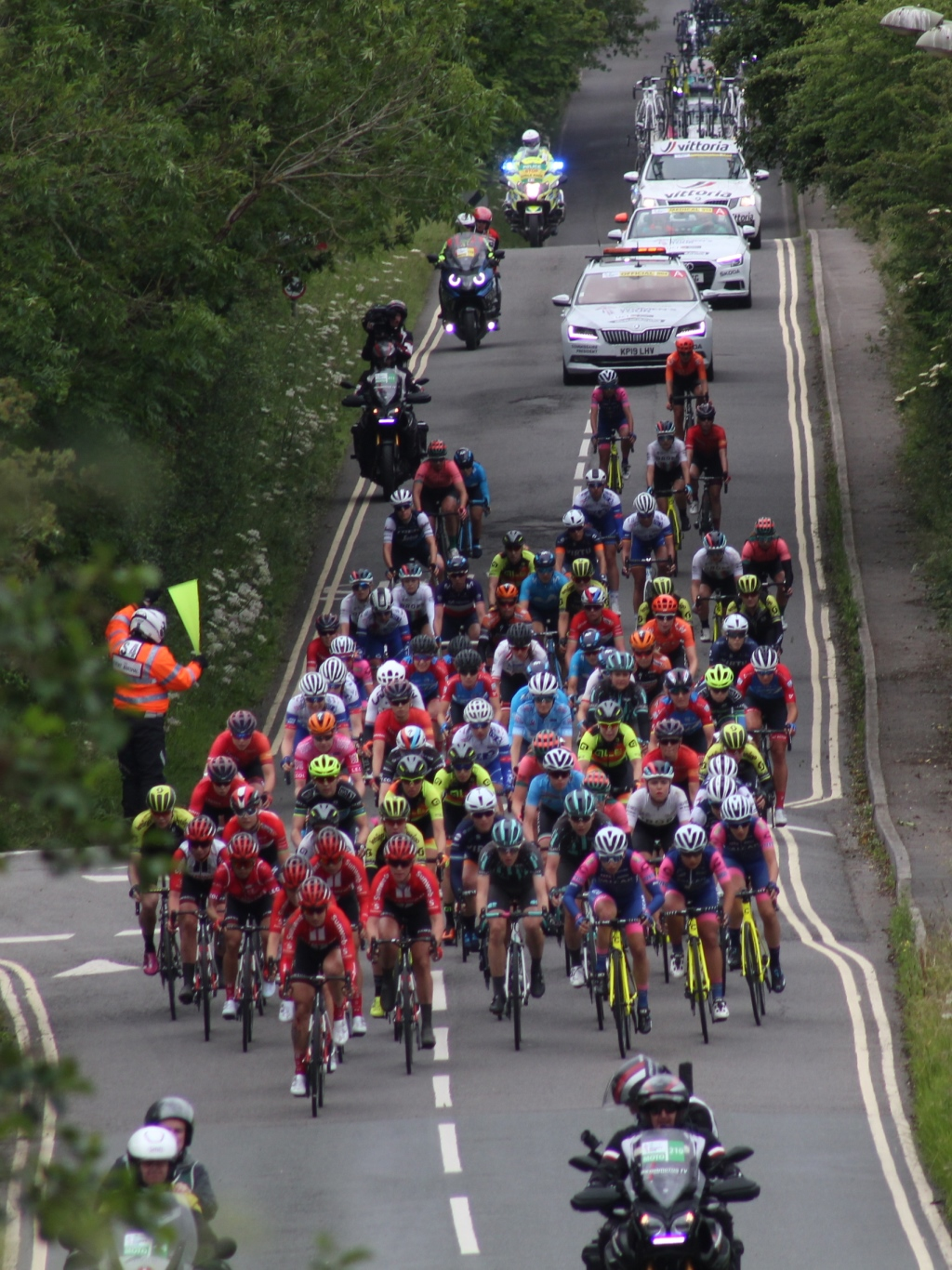
- The riders approaching Charlbury on stage 3

Race details
- Dates: 10–15 June 2019
- Stages: 6
- Distance: 791.4 km (491.8 mi)
- Winning time: 21h 09' 25"

Results
Jersey awarded to the overall winner	Winner	Lizzie Deignan (GBR)	(Trek–Segafredo)
	Second	Katarzyna Niewiadoma (POL)	(Canyon//SRAM)
	Third	Amy Pieters (NED)	(Boels–Dolmans)
Jersey awarded to the points classification winner	Points	Lizzie Deignan (GBR)	(Trek–Segafredo)
Jersey awarded to the mountains classification winner	Mountains	Katarzyna Niewiadoma (POL)	(Canyon//SRAM)
Jersey awarded to the sprints classification winner	Sprints	Coryn Rivera (USA)	(Team Sunweb)
	Combativity	Sarah Roy (AUS)	(Mitchelton–Scott)
	Team	Trek–Segafredo	

The 2019 Ovo Energy Women's Tour was the sixth staging of The Women's Tour, a women's cycling stage race held in the United Kingdom. It ran from 10 to 15 June 2019, as part of the 2019 UCI Women's World Tour.

The race was won by British rider Lizzie Deignan of Trek–Segafredo for the second time, beating Polish rider Katarzyna Niewiadoma of Canyon//SRAM by just two seconds. Deignan won stage 5 on her way to overall victory, as well as the points classification. Second place rider Niewiadoma won the mountains classification. Third place overall was Dutch rider Amy Pieters of Boels–Dolmans. The sprints classification was won by Coryn Rivera, and the team classification was won by Trek–Segafredo.

== Teams ==
Sixteen teams, each with a maximum of six riders, started the race:

UCI Women's WorldTeams

- Alé–Cipollini
- Bigla Pro Cycling
- Boels–Dolmans
- Canyon//SRAM
- CCC - Liv
- Drops
- FDJ Nouvelle-Aquitaine Futuroscope
- Mitchelton–Scott
- Movistar Team
- Parkhotel Valkenburg
- Team Sunweb
- Tibco–Silicon Valley Bank
- Team Virtu Cycling
- Trek–Segafredo
- Valcar–Cylance
- WNT–Rotor Pro Cycling

== Route ==
Stage schedule
Stage	Date	Course	Distance	Type	Winner
1	10 June	Beccles to Stowmarket	157.6 km (97.9 mi)	Flat stage	Jolien D'Hoore (BEL)
2	11 June	Cyclopark (Gravesend) to Cyclopark	62.5 km (38.8 mi)	Flat stage	Marianne Vos (NED)
3	12 June	Henley-on-Thames to Blenheim Palace	146.5 km (91.0 mi)	Hilly stage	Jolien D'Hoore (BEL)
4	13 June	Warwick to Burton Dassett	158.9 km (98.7 mi)	Hilly stage	Katarzyna Niewiadoma (POL)
5	14 June	Llandrindod Wells to Builth Wells	140 km (87.0 mi)	Hilly stage	Lizzie Deignan (GBR)
6	15 June	Carmarthen to Pembrey Country Park	125.9 km (78.2 mi)	Hilly stage	Amy Pieters (NED)
Total		791.4 km (491.8 mi)			

== Classification leadership table ==
Classification leadership by stage
Stage	Winner	General classification	Points classification	Mountains classification	Sprints classification	British rider classification	Combativity	Team classification
1	Jolien D'Hoore	Jolien D'Hoore	Jolien D'Hoore	Christine Majerus	Coryn Rivera	Ellie Dickinson	Abby-Mae Parkinson	Boels–Dolmans
2	Marianne Vos	Marianne Vos	Marianne Vos	Christine Majerus	Coryn Rivera	Lizzie Deignan	Elena Cecchini	Movistar
3	Jolien D'Hoore	Lisa Brennauer	Jolien d'Hoore	Christine Majerus	Coryn Rivera	Lizzie Deignan	Anna Plichta	Movistar
4	Katarzyna Niewiadoma	Liane Lippert	Jolien d'Hoore	Christine Majerus	Coryn Rivera	Lizzie Deignan	Sarah Roy	Team Sunweb
5	Lizzie Deignan	Lizzie Deignan	Lizzie Deignan	Katarzyna Niewiadoma	Coryn Rivera	Lizzie Deignan	Amalie Dideriksen	Trek-Segafredo
6	Amy Pieters	Lizzie Deignan	Lizzie Deignan	Katarzyna Niewiadoma	Coryn Rivera	Lizzie Deignan	Leah Thomas	Trek-Segafredo
Final		Lizzie Deignan	Lizzie Deignan	Katarzyna Niewiadoma	Coryn Rivera	Lizzie Deignan	Sarah Roy	Trek-Segafredo

== Final standings ==
Final general classification
Rank	Rider	Team	Time
1	Lizzie Deignan (GBR)	Trek–Segafredo	21h 09' 25"
2	Katarzyna Niewiadoma (POL)	Canyon//SRAM	+ 2"
3	Amy Pieters (NED)	Boels–Dolmans	+ 23"
4	Christine Majerus (LUX)	Boels–Dolmans	+ 49"
5	Demi Vollering (NED)	Parkhotel Valkenburg	+ 51"
6	Leah Kirchmann (CAN)	Team Sunweb	+ 54"
7	Lizzy Banks (GBR)	Bigla Pro Cycling	+ 58"
8	Leah Thomas (USA)	Bigla Pro Cycling	+ 58"
9	Małgorzata Jasińska (POL)	Movistar Team	+ 59"
10	Elisa Longo Borghini (ITA)	Trek–Segafredo	+ 1' 01"

== See also ==
- 2019 in women's road cycling
