= Katarzyna Niewiadoma-Phinney =

Polish professional cyclist (born 1994)

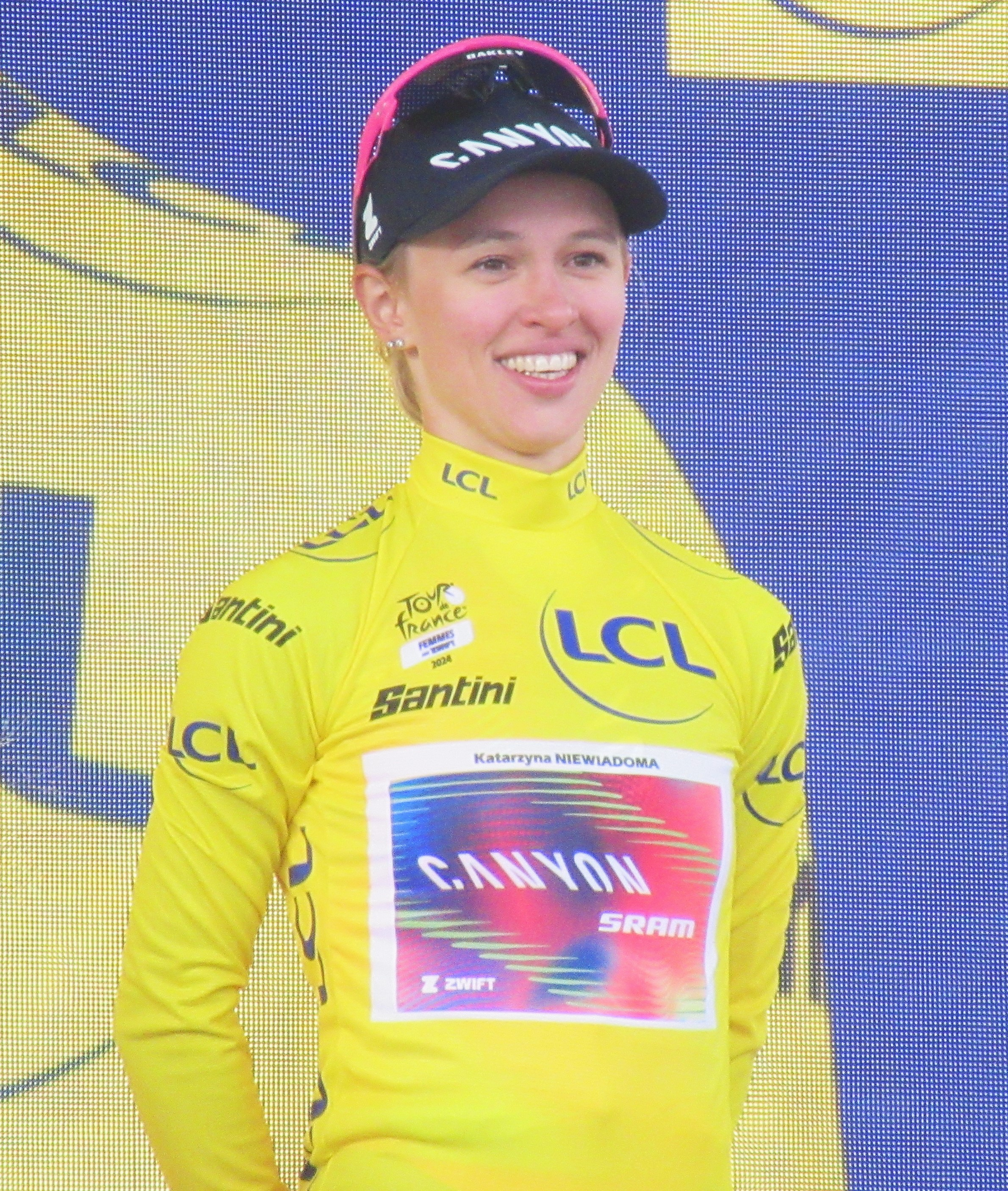
- Niewiadoma at the 2024 Tour de France Femmes

Personal information
- Full name: Katarzyna Niewiadoma-Phinney
- Nickname: Kasia
- Born: 29 September 1994 (age 32) Limanowa, Poland
- Height: 169 cm (5 ft 7 in)
- Weight: 49 kg (108 lb)

Cycling career
- Sport: Cycling
- Current team: Canyon//SRAM
- Discipline: Road
- Role: Rider
- Rider type: Climbing specialist

Amateur teams
- 2009–2012: WLKS Krakus BBC Czaja
- 2013: TKK Pacific Toruń

Professional teams
- 2013: → Rabobank-Liv Giant (stagiaire)
- 2014–2017: WM3 Energie
- 2018–2026: Canyon//SRAM
- 2027–: Lidl–Trek

Major wins
- Gravel World Championships (2023) Road Major Tours Tour de France General classification (2024) Mountains classification (2023) 1 individual stage (2026) Giro d'Italia Young rider classification (2015, 2016) Stage races Emakumeen Euskal Bira (2015) Grand Prix Elsy Jacobs (2016) Giro del Trentino Alto Adige-Südtirol (2016) The Women's Tour (2017) One-day races and Classics National Road Race Championships (2016, 2025) National Time Trial Championships (2016) Amstel Gold Race (2019) Trofeo Alfredo Binda (2018) La Flèche Wallonne (2024)
Medal record
Women's road cycling
Representing Poland
World Championships
Bronze medal – third place	2021 Flanders	Road race
European Games
Silver medal – second place	2015 Baku	Road race
European Road Championships
Gold medal – first place	2015 Tartu	Under-23 road race
Gold medal – first place	2016 Plumelec	Under-23 road race
Silver medal – second place	2016 Plumelec	Elite road race
Silver medal – second place	2025 Guilherand-Granges	Road race
Bronze medal – third place	2020 Plouay	Road race
Representing Rabobank-Liv Woman Cycling Team
World Championships
Bronze medal – third place	2015 Richmond	Team time trial
Women's gravel bicycle racing
World Championships
Gold medal – first place	2023 Veneto	Elite

Katarzyna "Kasia" Niewiadoma-Phinney (Polish pronunciation: [kataˈʐɨna ɲɛvjaˈdɔma]; born 29 September 1994) is a Polish racing cyclist who rides for UCI Women's WorldTeam Canyon//SRAM. Among her eighteen professional wins are the Tour de France Femmes in 2024, La Flèche Wallonne in 2024, the Amstel Gold Race in 2019, the Trofeo Alfredo Binda-Comune di Cittiglio in 2018, and the Women's Tour in 2017. She finished third overall three times in the Tour de France Femmes, in 2022, 2023, and 2025, taking the Queen of the Mountains jersey in 2023. In 2023, she became UCI Gravel World Champion.

== Early years ==
Born in Limanowa, Poland, Niewiadoma started racing bikes with local club WLKS Krakus BBC Czaja and soon emerged as one of the most promising women riders in Poland with TKK Pacific Toruń. In 2013, she won two national Under-23 champion titles, finishing 4th overall in both the time trial and road race events. She also finished 5th in the under-23 road race at the European Road Championships.

Following these performances, she received an offer from a professional team Rabobank-Liv Giant and became a stagiaire in September 2013. She participated in the Holland Ladies Tour, finishing 10th overall and winning the young rider classification. Niewiadoma was also selected for the road race at the 2013 UCI Road World Championships, but she did not finish.

== Professional career ==
=== Rabo–Liv (2014–2017) ===
==== 2014 ====
Niewiadoma signed a one-year contract with Rabobank-Liv Woman Cycling Team in October 2013 and debuted in the professional ranks in February 2014. She took her first victory four months later, winning the Swiss race GP du Canton d'Argovie. Preparing for the Giro d'Italia Femminile, Niewiadoma participated in the Polish National Championships, taking bronze in the time trial and finishing 8th in the road race. Her climbing abilities proved to be an asset for the Rabobank-Liv Woman Cycling Team team at the Giro d'Italia Femminile, as she worked for the final victory of Marianne Vos on the mountain stages in the Alps. She finished 11th overall, and 3rd in the young rider classification, marking a successful debut in the biggest race of the elite women's calendar in her first year as a professional.

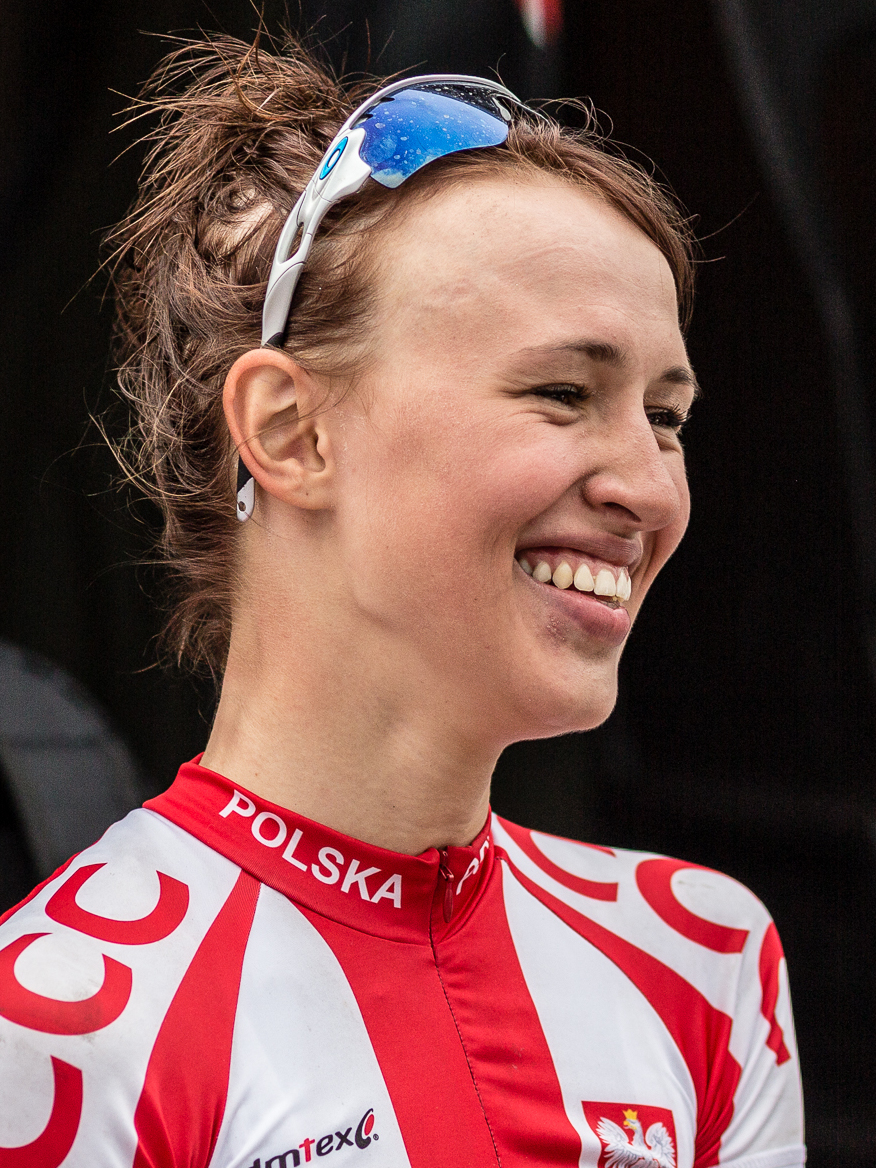
Niewiadoma at the 2014 UCI Road World Championships

Niewiadoma then went on to take her first podium spot in a stage race. Together with Anna van der Breggen and Vos she dominated racing during the inaugural edition of the Ladies Tour of Norway and placed 3rd, winning the young rider and mountains classifications. In September, she signed a two-year contract extension with the Rabobank-Liv Woman Cycling Team team and concluded preparations for the World Championships with a start in the Premondiale Giro della Toscana, placing 8th overall. On a hilly World Championships route in Ponferrada, Spain, she led the Polish team in the road race, coming to the finish in 11th place after a sprint from the selected group.

==== 2015 ====
In her second year as a professional, Niewiadoma shone as one of the best young riders in the peloton, giving Poland results it had never had in women's cycling. She once again demonstrated her climbing abilities with 6th place in the inaugural edition of the Strade Bianche Donne, and 5th in the prestigious World Cup race La Flèche Wallonne Féminine. She also took a podium spot in the Holland Hills Classic, finishing behind Lizzie Armitstead and Emma Johansson. In June she won the Emakumeen Euskal Bira, a five-day stage race in the Basque Country, and won silver in the women's road race at the European Games.

Despite being only 20, Niewiadoma started the season's biggest race – the Giro Rosa – as one of Rabobank-Liv Woman Cycling Team's leaders, alongside world champion Pauline Ferrand-Prévot and Anna van der Breggen. She assumed the lead of the young rider classification following the second stage, and held on to the top places on the mountain stages. She then clocked the fifth-fastest time on the demanding route of the penultimate stage, a 21.7-kilometre (13.5-mile) time trial, and rose to fourth overall with the final stage – culminating in a summit finish – remaining. The long climb to San Domenico di Varzo proved decisive and Niewiadoma crossed the line in 7th, dropping to 5th overall – although she won the white jersey for best young rider and contributed towards Van der Breggen's overall success. With those results under her belt Niewiadoma led the Polish national team at the UEC European Road Championships in Tartu, Estonia and took gold in the women's under-23 road race, bridging to the leading group on the last lap and claiming the sprint ahead of Italy's Ilaria Sanguineti and fellow Rabobank-Liv Woman Cycling Team riders Thalita de Jong and Anouska Koster. She concluded the season at the World Championships in Richmond, Virginia, being a part of a Rabobank-Liv Woman Cycling Team squad that secured bronze in the team time trial. She also led the Polish team in the road race, and sprinted to 7th place.

==== 2016 ====
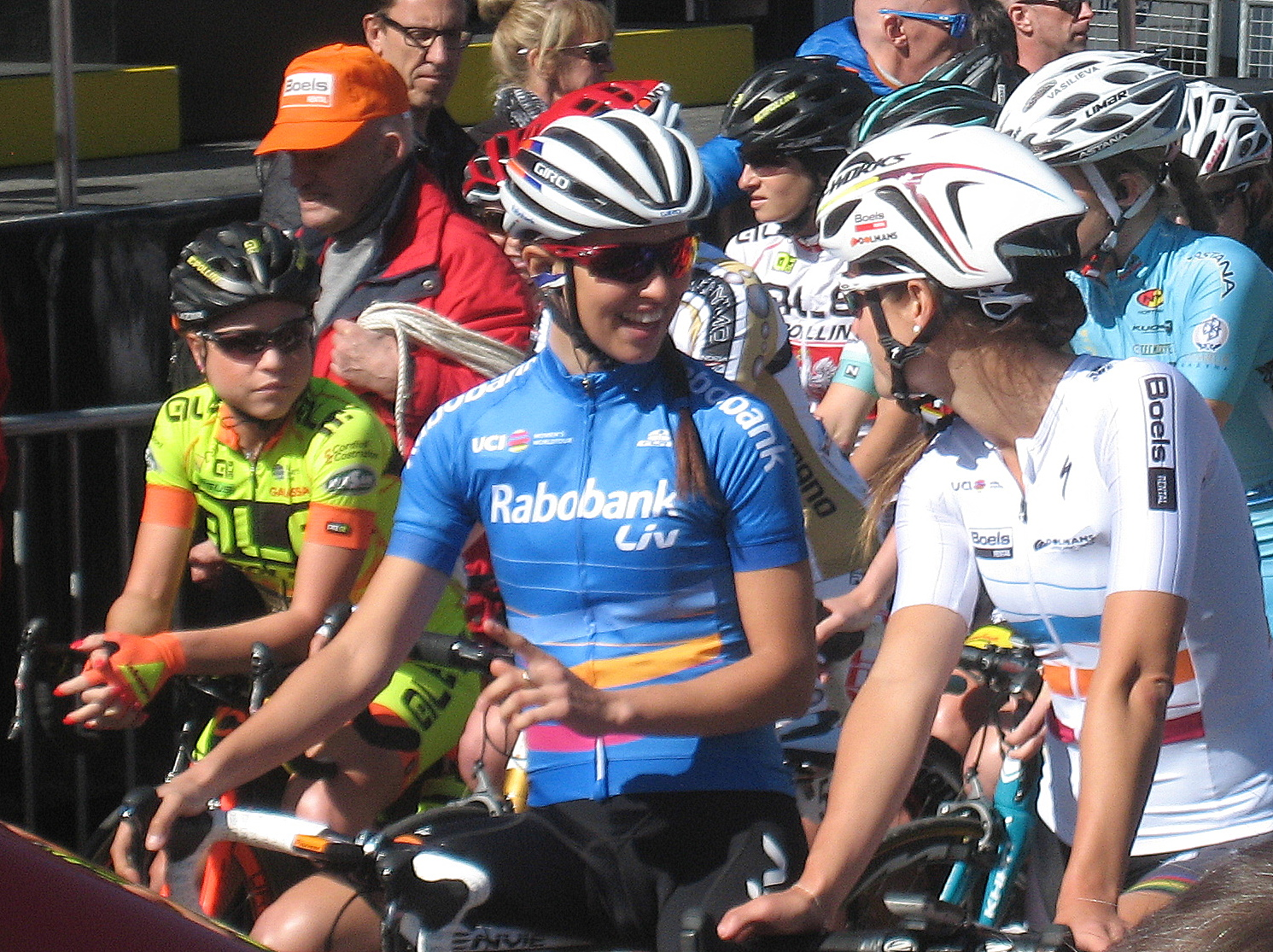
Niewiadoma (in blue) talking with Lizzie Armitstead before the 2016 La Flèche Wallonne Féminine.

Niewiadoma improved on her previous result at Strade Bianche – the first event to be held as part of the UCI Women's World Tour – finishing second to Lizzie Armitstead in Siena. She added further top-ten finishes at World Tour level, with seventh at the Trofeo Alfredo Binda-Comune di Cittiglio, and tenth at the Tour of Flanders, before taking her first win of the season at the Ronde van Gelderland in a three-rider sprint against Natalie van Gogh and Lieselot Decroix. After a fourth-place finish at La Flèche Wallonne Féminine, Niewiadoma took a stage victory and the general classification at the Festival Luxembourgeois du cyclisme féminin Elsy Jacobs. She then followed this up with another stage win and general classification double, at the Giro del Trentino Alto Adige-Südtirol. At the Polish National Championships, Niewiadoma won both the time trial and road race titles – she won the time trial by 24 seconds ahead of Katarzyna Pawłowska, and the road race by 44 seconds ahead of Anna Plichta.

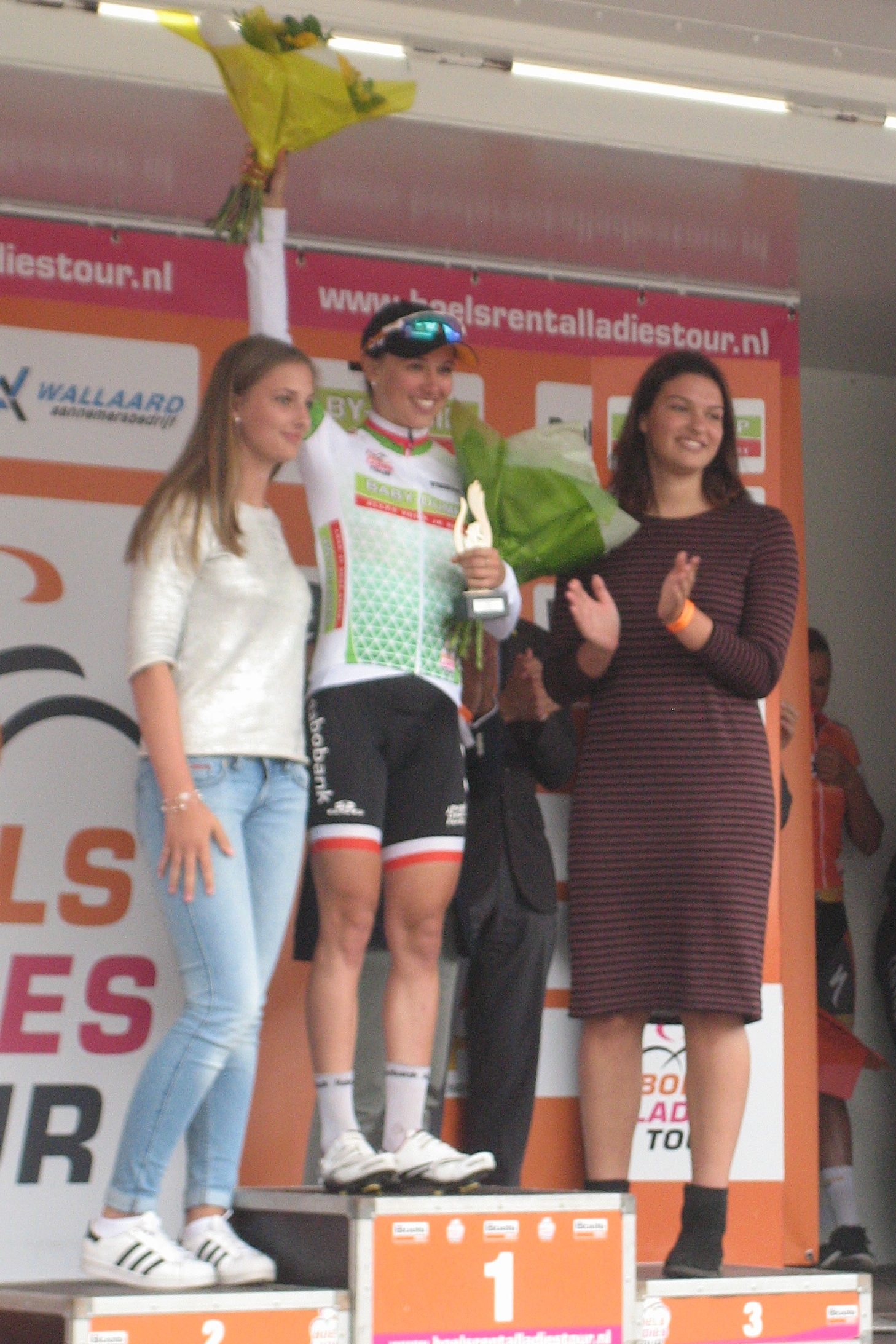
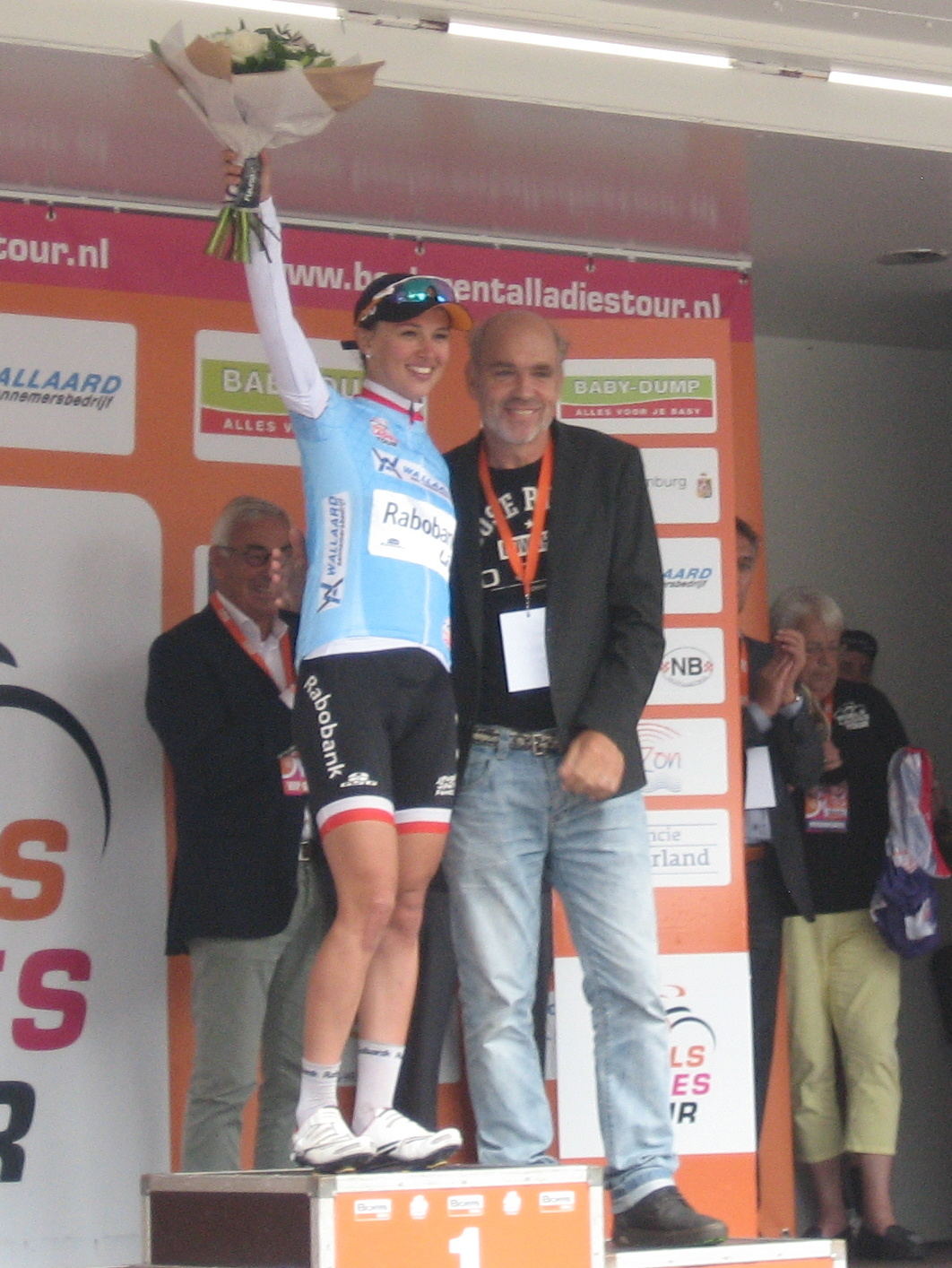
At the 2016 Holland Ladies Tour, Niewiadoma won the jerseys for the points (green) and young rider (light blue) classifications.

Moving onto the Giro d'Italia Femminile, Niewiadoma spent a portion of the race in second place overall, before losing more than four minutes on the fifth stage, which dropped her to ninth place; she eventually recovered to seventh overall, winning the young rider classification. She was part of the leading group during the road race at the Rio Olympics, but was unable to follow moves by five other riders, and missed out on a medal; she ultimately finished in sixth place. A fourth-place finish at the GP de Plouay – Bretagne followed later in August, before a fifth-place overall finish at the Holland Ladies Tour. Niewiadoma also won two stages during the race, as well as the points and young rider classifications. She then won two medals at the UEC European Road Championships in France – she won a silver medal in the women's road race, being beaten in the sprint to the line by her Rabobank-Liv Woman Cycling Team teammate Anna van der Breggen; however, she won a gold medal in the concurrent race for under-23 riders, as the only such rider in the lead group overall.

==== 2017 ====
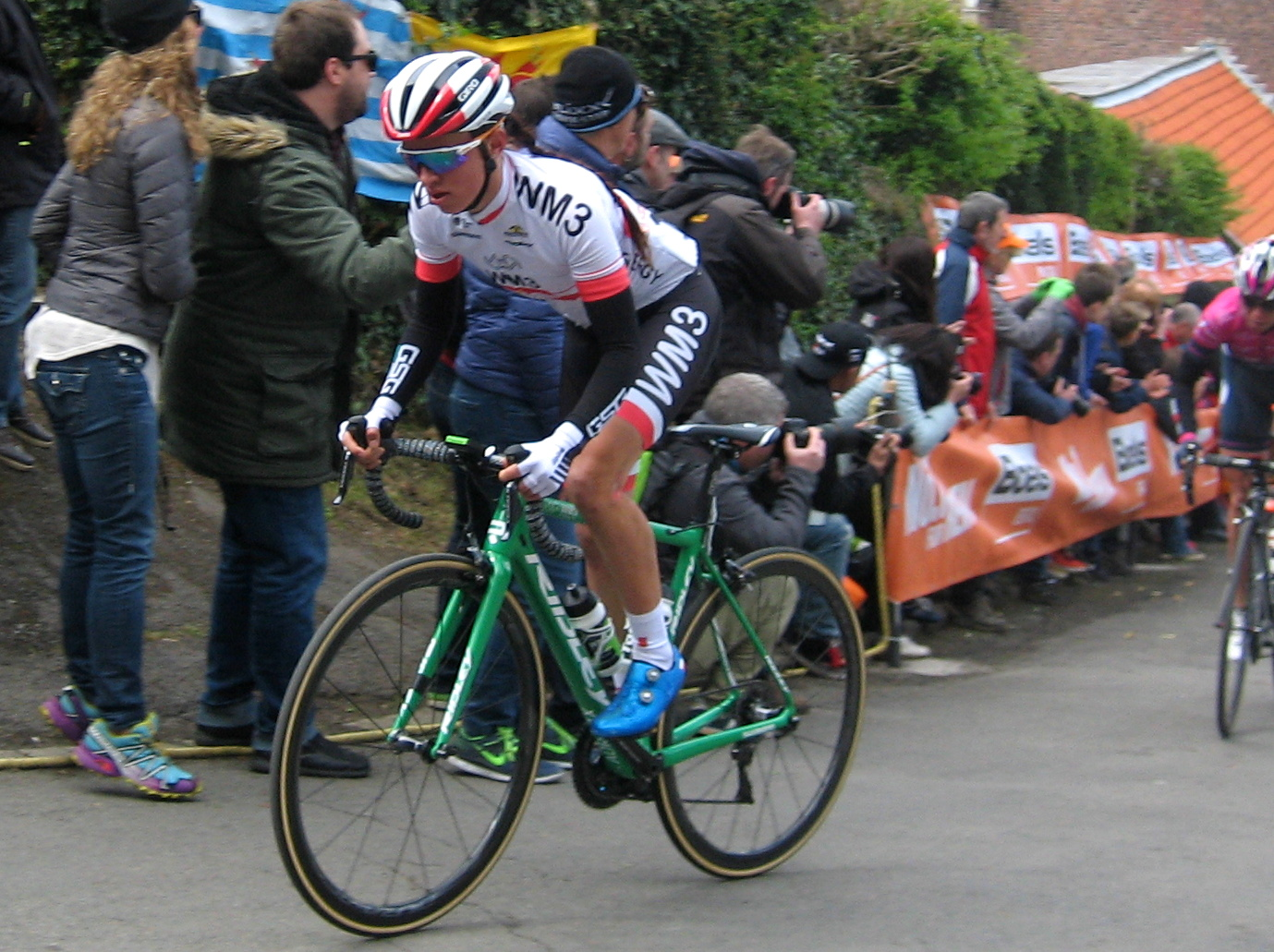
Niewiadoma, wearing the Polish national road race champion's jersey, at the 2017 La Flèche Wallonne Féminine. Niewiadoma finished third in all three Ardennes classics races in 2017.

Niewiadoma's spring campaign in the 2017 season saw no wins, but she did record four podium finishes – all coming in UCI Women's World Tour events. Just as she did in 2016, Niewiadoma finished second in Strade Bianche, with Elisa Longo Borghini getting the better of her in the closing metres. In the Ardennes classics, Niewiadoma took three third-place finishes, finishing behind Anna van der Breggen and Lizzie Deignan on each occasion. At the Amstel Gold Race – returning the calendar following a 14-year hiatus – Niewiadoma, Longo Borghini and Deignan were clear of the peloton on the final circuit around Valkenburg aan de Geul, before being caught by Van der Breggen, Annemiek van Vleuten and Coryn Rivera with around 8 kilometres (5.0 miles) remaining. Van der Breggen soloed away to the victory not long after; in the sprint for second, Deignan prevailed, while Niewiadoma and Van Vleuten could not be separated in the photo finish, and thus shared third place. At La Flèche Wallonne Féminine, Niewiadoma attacked inside the final 10 kilometres (6.2 miles), on the Cote de Cherave, with only Deignan and Van der Breggen able to follow. Deignan forced Niewiadoma's hand with an attack before the Mur de Huy, with her Boels–Dolmans teammate Van der Breggen ultimately pulling clear prior to the final ascent. Lastly, at Liège–Bastogne–Liège Femmes, Niewiadoma was combative, attacking on each of the last two climbs. With Van der Breggen eventually soloing clear to another victory, Deignan and Niewiadoma did battle for second place, with honours ultimately going to Deignan.

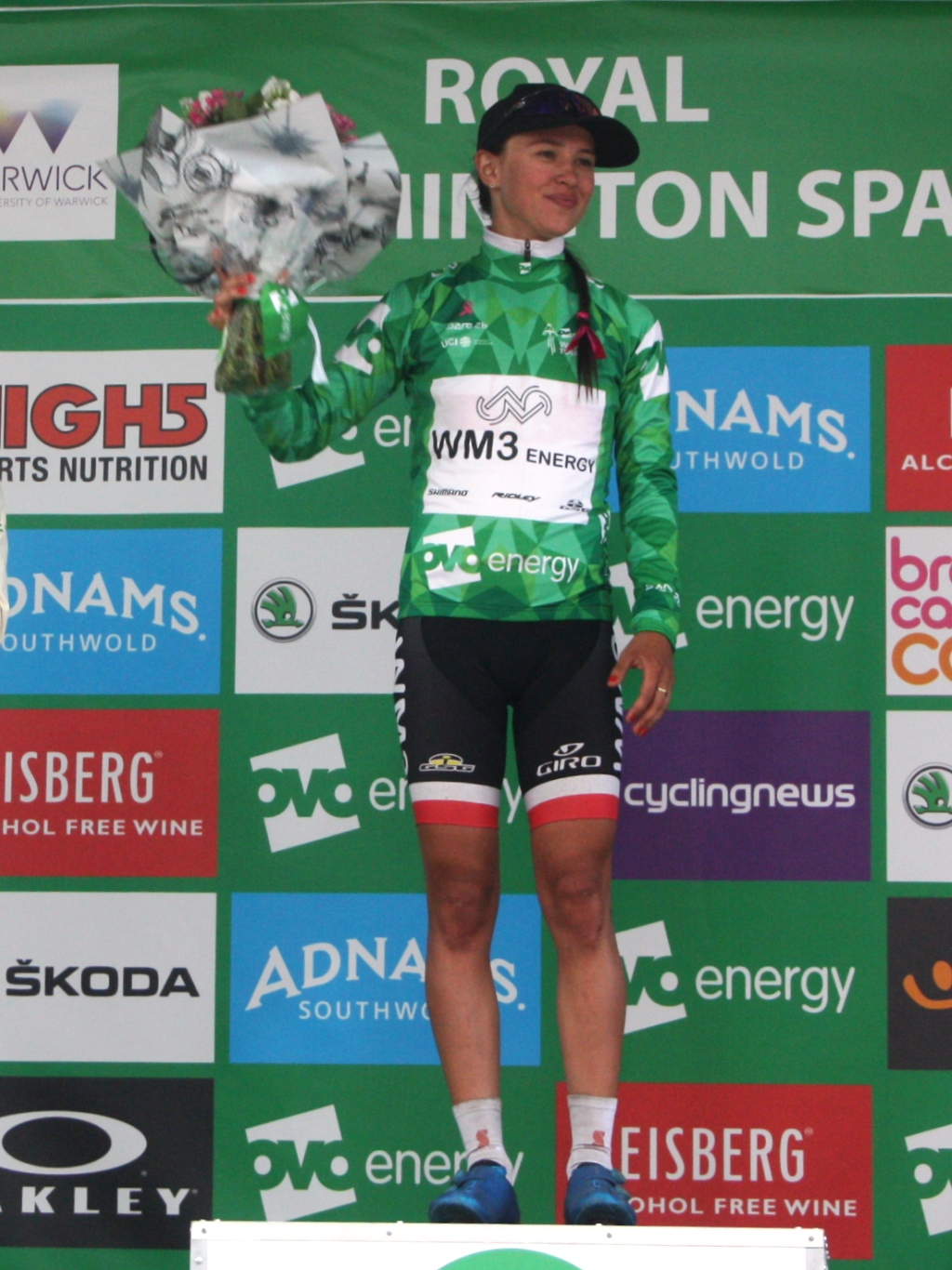
Niewiadoma at the 2017 The Women's Tour, where she won the opening stage and the green jersey as the winner of the general classification

Niewiadoma's next start was at The Women's Tour, where she won the opening stage after a nearly 50-kilometre (31-mile) solo breakaway, with a winning margin of 1 minute, 42 seconds over teammate Marianne Vos. Niewiadoma maintained her overall lead for the remainder of the race, ultimately winning the race by 1 minute, 18 seconds ahead of Christine Majerus, and moved atop of the UCI Women's World Tour rankings. She led the WM3 Energie team at the Giro d'Italia Femminile, where she finished in sixth place overall, and ceded the World Tour lead to Van der Breggen. She finished ninth in La Course by Le Tour de France, seventh overall at the Holland Ladies Tour, and concluded her season with fifth place in the road race at the UCI Road World Championships, having been part of the lead group in the closing 10 kilometres (6.2 miles). Niewiadoma ultimately finished the season in third place in the overall UCI Women's World Tour standings.

=== Canyon–SRAM (2018–2026) ===
In July 2017, Niewiadoma was announced to be joining the Canyon//SRAM team for the 2018 season, signing an initial three-year deal.

==== 2018 ====
Niewiadoma made her first start with Canyon//SRAM at February's Setmana Ciclista Valenciana, where she finished seventh overall and also aided teammate Hannah Barnes towards her overall victory. A third consecutive second-place finish at Strade Bianche followed; having been dropped by Anna van der Breggen and Elisa Longo Borghini on the penultimate gravel sector, she later rejoined Longo Borghini before dropping her in the final kilometre. A couple of weeks later, she won the Trofeo Alfredo Binda-Comune di Cittiglio, after an 8-kilometre (5.0-mile) solo move; in the process, she moved into the lead of the UCI Women's World Tour rankings. After another top-ten finish at the Tour of Flanders, Niewiadoma returned to the podium at the Tour of California, finishing third on the second stage to South Lake Tahoe, and ultimately third overall in the race.

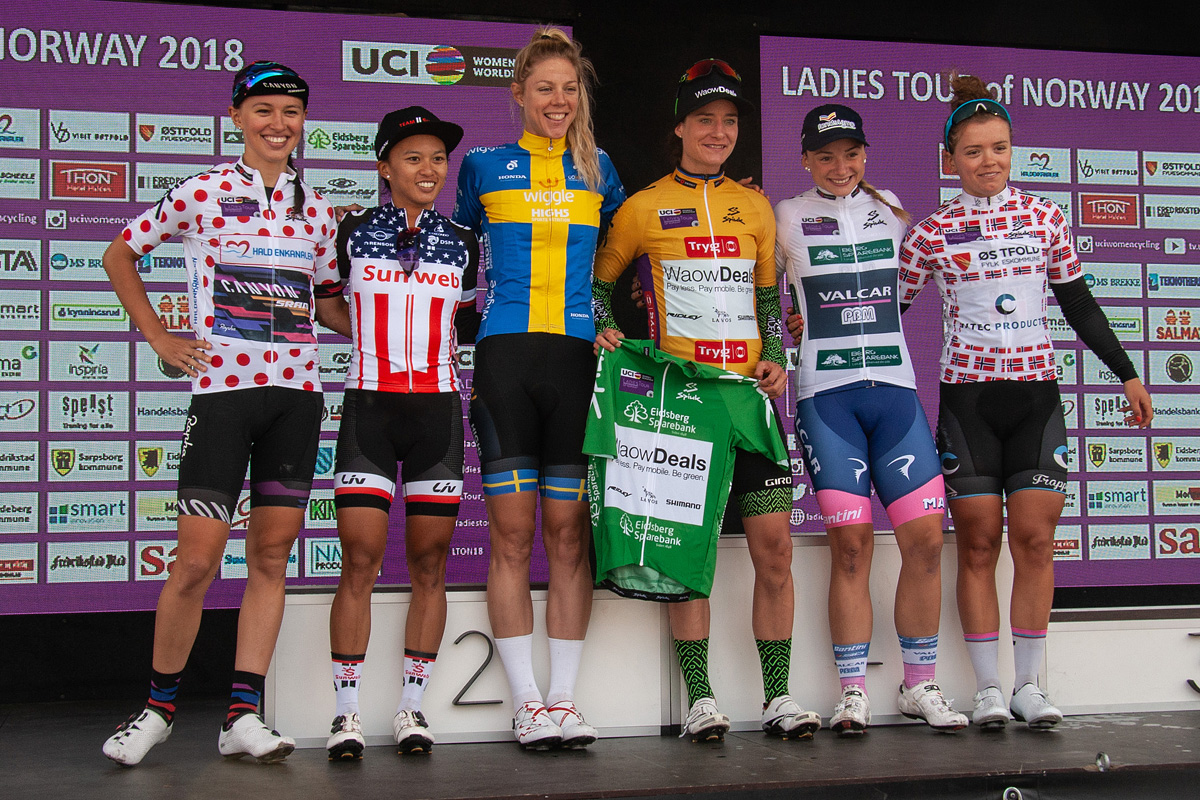
Niewiadoma (far left) won the mountains classification at the Ladies Tour of Norway

During the summer months, Niewiadoma recorded finishes of seventh overall at the Giro Rosa, sixth at La Course by Le Tour de France, and fifth overall at the Ladies Tour of Norway, also winning the mountains classification in Norway. Niewiadoma's last warm-up race prior to the UCI Road World Championships was the Tour Cycliste Féminin International de l'Ardèche; she won the fifth stage which finished with a summit finish at Mont Lozère, before finishing second to Ruth Winder in Montboucher-sur-Jabron the following day, while gaining 46 seconds on race leader Margarita Victoria García. Taking a 41-second lead into the final stage, Niewiadoma gained further time on García, ultimately finishing 1 minute, 28 seconds clear in the general classification and she also won the mountains classification. In the World Championships, Niewiadoma finished more than seven minutes down on race winner Van der Breggen, in twelfth place.

==== 2019 ====
For the fourth year in a row, Niewiadoma finished in the podium placings at Strade Bianche, adding a third-place finish to her three second-place finishes. Over March and April, Niewiadoma recorded six top-ten finishes (four of which were sixth-place finishes), peaking with victory at the Amstel Gold Race. Niewiadoma attacked on the last ascent of the Cauberg with former teammate Marianne Vos, before pulling clear with a gap of a few seconds over Annemiek van Vleuten; Van Vleuten attempted to close down the margin in the final 2 kilometres (1.2 miles) but Niewiadoma was able to hold on for her second Women's World Tour one-day victory, after her earlier success at the 2018 Trofeo Alfredo Binda-Comune di Cittiglio.

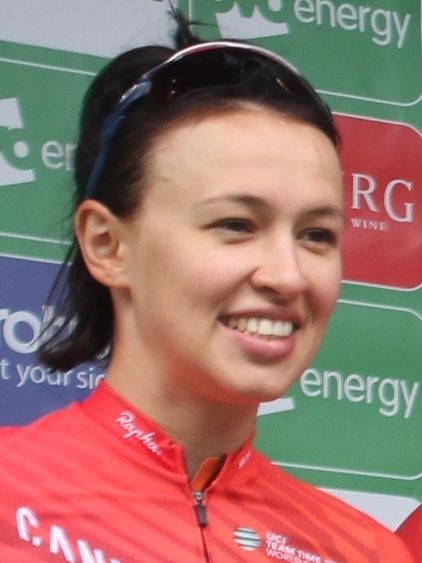
Niewiadoma at the 2019 The Women's Tour, where she finished second overall. During the race, she also won the penultimate stage and the mountains classification.

After a fifth-place overall finish at the Tour of California, Niewiadoma jointly led the Canyon//SRAM team at The Women's Tour with home rider Hannah Barnes. On the fourth stage, which included three ascents in the Burton Dassett Hills (including the race's first hilltop finish), Niewiadoma outsprinted Liane Lippert to the finish line for the victory, moving up to second place overall but on the same time as Lippert. The following day, Niewiadoma finished second to Lizzie Deignan in Builth Wells, with Deignan taking the race lead by one second ahead of Niewiadoma; Deignan added a further second to her advantage on the final day, to take the general classification by its closest winning margin to that point. Niewiadoma did come away from the race with the mountains classification, edging out Christine Majerus by one point.

Canyon//SRAM won the opening stage team time trial at the Giro Rosa, and with Niewiadoma being the first of the team's riders to cross the finish line in Castellania Coppi, she assumed the race leader's pink jersey for the first time in her career. She held the race lead until the fifth stage, when Van Vleuten won by almost three minutes to overturn a previous gap of forty-seven seconds. Niewiadoma's main time loss came on the penultimate stage, finishing at the Altopiano del Montasio, losing almost four minutes compared to Van Vleuten and Anna van der Breggen, dropping her from third to sixth overall; she did regain fifth place in the general classification on the final stage, finishing almost eight minutes down on Van Vleuten. She finished fourth overall at August's Ladies Tour of Norway, but finished outside the top-20 in the road race at the UCI Road World Championships in Yorkshire, stating that she had "mentally cracked" during the race. She also extended her contract with Canyon//SRAM until the end of the 2021 season.

==== 2020 ====
Niewiadoma's 2020 season started following the COVID-19 pandemic-enforced suspension of racing, failing to finish at Strade Bianche for the first time in her career. She won her second elite European Road Championships medal, winning a bronze medal in the road race in Plouay, having been part of a four-rider breakaway alongside Annemiek van Vleuten, Elisa Longo Borghini and Chantal Blaak. She again made into the race-winning move at La Course by Le Tour de France two days later, but missed the podium with fourth in the small group sprint. At the Giro Rosa, Niewiadoma spent almost the entire race in the top-three placings, recording two top-three stage finishes on her way to second place overall, behind Anna van der Breggen; she wore the race leader's pink jersey on stage eight, as the overnight leader Van Vleuten withdrew due to injuries suffered in a crash during the finish to the previous stage. Prior to the end of the season, Niewiadoma finished seventh in the road race at the UCI Road World Championships, and tenth at La Flèche Wallonne Féminine.

==== 2021 ====
Having missed the podium with a fourth-place finish at the Trofeo Alfredo Binda-Comune di Cittiglio, Niewiadoma finished second in a sprint-à-deux with Annemiek van Vleuten in Dwars door Vlaanderen. In April 2021, Niewiadoma signed a new three-year contract with Canyon//SRAM, extending her tenure with the team until the end of the 2024 season. Three top-ten finishes in the Ardennes classics followed, with her best result being another sprint-à-deux loss, this time to Anna van der Breggen, at La Flèche Wallonne Féminine. Further fourth-place finishes came at the Liège–Bastogne–Liège Femmes and the Durango-Durango Emakumeen Saria, before missing out on a stage victory at the Vuelta a Burgos Feminas to Cecilie Uttrup Ludwig. After a sixth-place finish at La Course by Le Tour de France, Niewiadoma elected to forego participation in the Giro Rosa, instead concentrating on the road race at the COVID-19 pandemic-delayed Tokyo Olympics. Niewiadoma ultimately finished outside the top ten placings, a result that left her "disappointed".

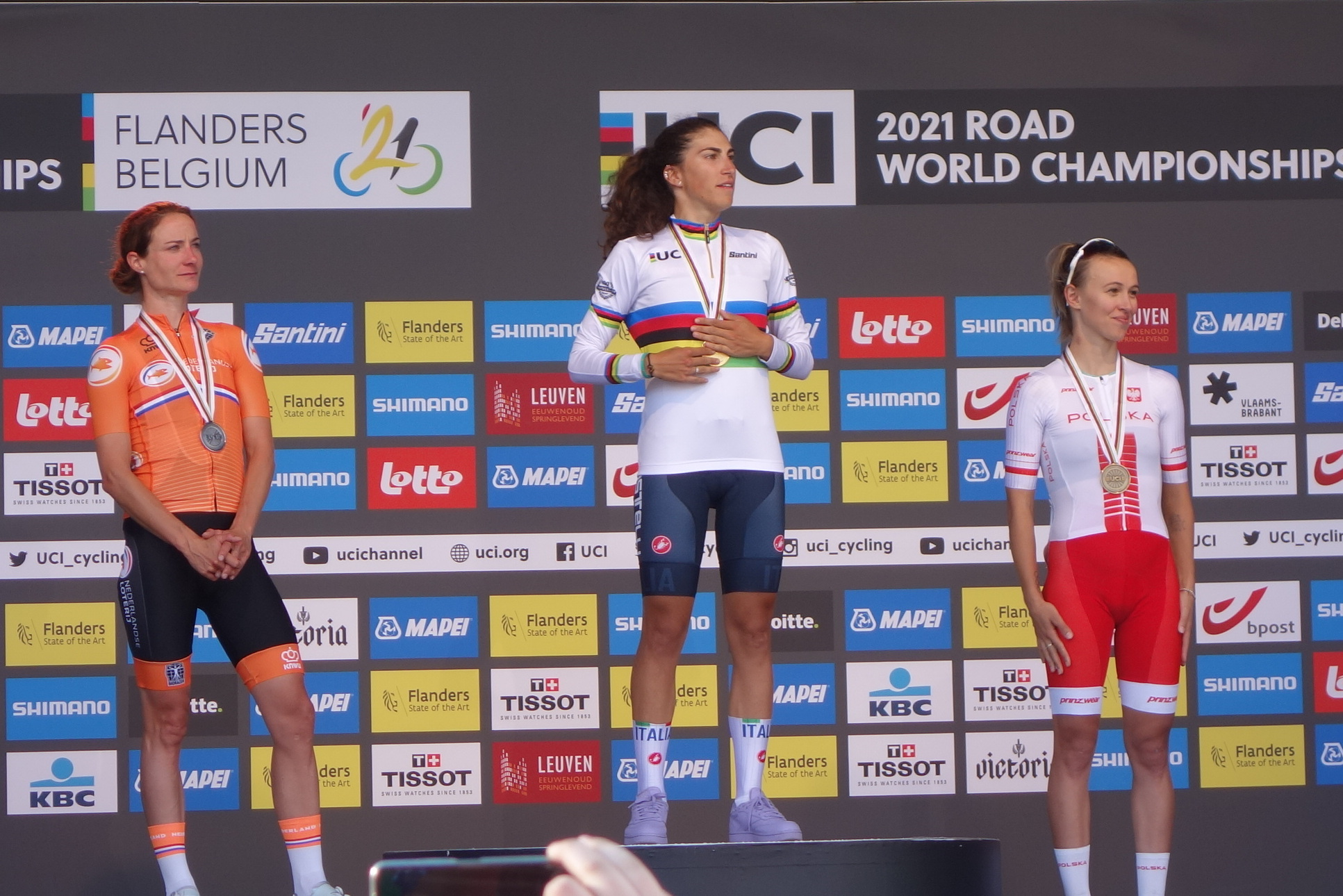
Niewiadoma (right) after winning the bronze medal in the road race at the 2021 UCI Road World Championships; she finished one second behind Elisa Balsamo (centre) and Marianne Vos (left).

A fourth second-place finish in 2021 occurred for Niewiadoma during the penultimate stage of August's Holland Ladies Tour, missing out to former teammate Marianne Vos. She finished sixth overall at the Challenge by La Vuelta, before contesting the road race at the UEC European Road Championships, where she just missed out on a medal, finishing fourth. Niewiadoma's near-miss was not repeated a fortnight later in the road race at the UCI Road World Championships in the Flanders region of Belgium. Niewiadoma launched several attacks on the circuits in and around Leuven, but was not able to gain clear ground, and the race came back together for a reduced group sprint; despite her attacks, Niewiadoma had enough energy to contend for the medals, and secured a bronze medal behind Elisa Balsamo and Vos, for her first individual World Championships medal. She finished the season with a crash and DNF at Paris–Roubaix Femmes, suffering a sore knee in the process.

==== 2022 ====
Niewiadoma did not podium until April's Brabantse Pijl, where she outsprinted Liane Lippert for second place behind the race winner, Demi Vollering. At The Women's Tour in June, Niewiadoma finished both of the Welsh stages in second place; on stage four, she was beaten by Grace Brown, while Elisa Longo Borghini beat Niewiadoma the following day. In the final general classification, Longo Borghini beat Brown by one second, with Niewiadoma in third place, five seconds in arrears. In July, she was named as one of the pre-race favourites for the first edition of the Tour de France Femmes, and eventually finished third overall, having recorded five top-ten stage finishes and been in the top-three overall from the second stage. She concluded her season with tenth overall at the Challenge by La Vuelta, and then eighth place in the road race at the UCI Road World Championships, having attacked late on.

==== 2023 ====
Having not won a race since 2019, Niewiadoma attempted to break her win hoodoo in the spring classics, however her best results were fourth in the Amstel Gold Race, and fifth in the Tour of Flanders. She returned to the podium at the Itzulia Women, finishing third on the opening stage and ultimately, third overall behind SD Worx teammates Marlen Reusser and Demi Vollering. In the Tour de France Femmes, she finished third overall for the second year in a row, as well as winning the polka-dot jersey as winner of the Queen of the Mountains (QoM) classification. In October, Niewiadoma won the 2023 UCI Gravel World Championships with a solo attack in the final 25 km to beat Silvia Persico and Demi Vollering over a 140 km course in Veneto, Italy.

==== 2024 ====
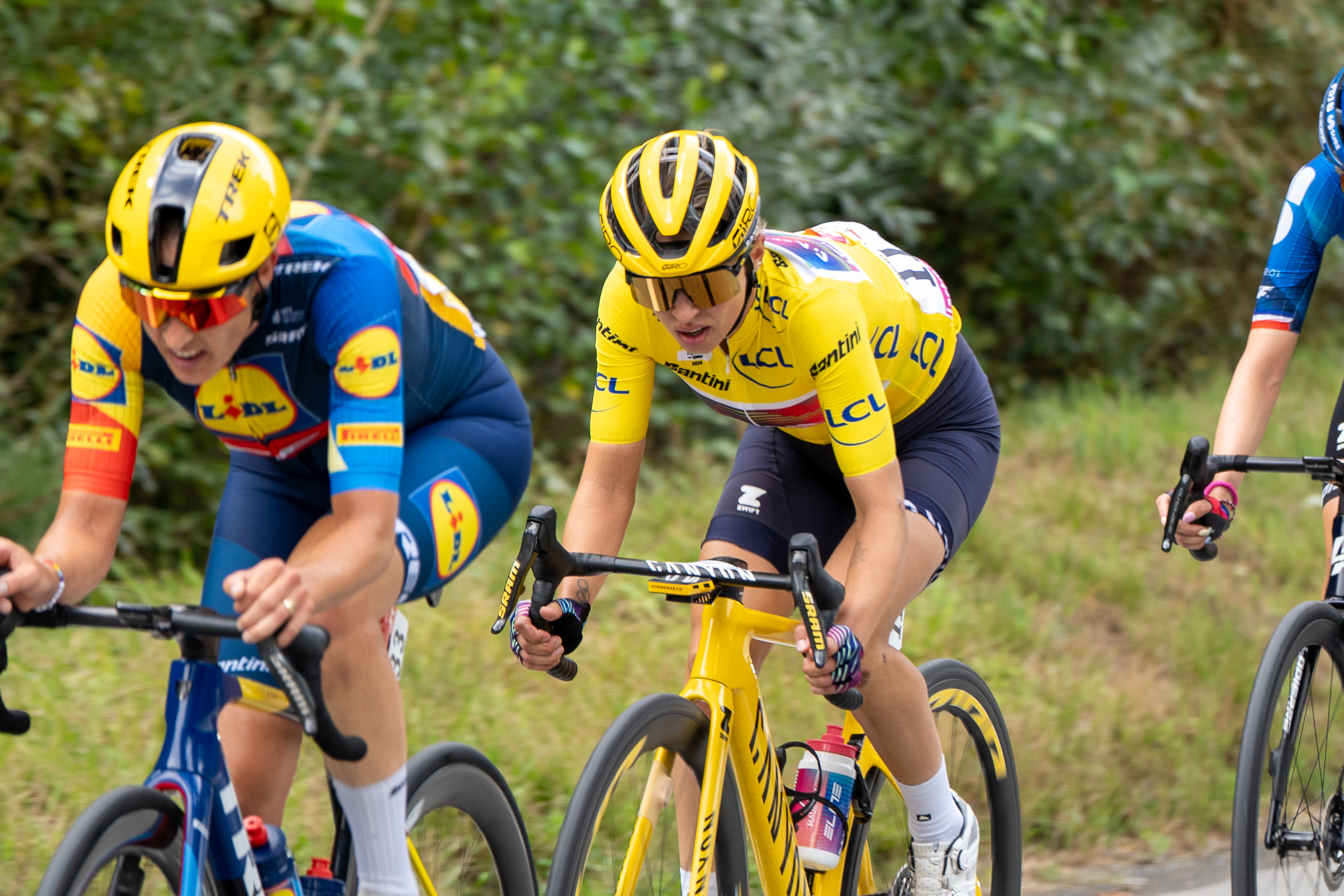
Niewiadoma riding in the yellow jersey on stage 8 of the 2024 Tour de France Femmes.

In the spring classics, Niewiadoma came second in the Tour of Flanders, before winning La Flèche Wallonne Féminine – her first UCI Women's World Tour win since 2019. At the 2024 Summer Olympics, she participated in the women's individual road race. During the race Chloé Dygert and Elise Chabbey were involved in a crash on the circuit, and a forced bike change diminished Niewiadoma's opportunities as the lead group and the race for the medals broke clear from the peloton. She put in an attack to try to reach the leaders on the second circuit, but was forced to be in the second chase group and ultimately claimed eighth place. In June, she signed a two-year contract extension with Canyon//SRAM, taking her to the end of the 2026 season.

On 18 August, she won the Tour de France Femmes by 4 seconds ahead of defending champion Demi Vollering, the closest finish in the history of the Tour. The victory marked the biggest achievement of Niewiadoma's career as well as her first major stage race win for seven years. She described her victory in the race as "surreal" and stated that it was like a childhood dream come true.

==== 2025 ====
In the spring classics, Niewiadoma-Phinney finished 4th at both the Tour of Flanders and Liège–Bastogne–Liège Femmes. At the Polish National Championships, she won the road race title, and finished second in the time trial. At the Tour de France Femmes, Niewiadoma-Phinney was considered a favourite for the overall victory, following her 3rd place finish at the Tour de Suisse Women prior to the event. She eventually finished the Tour 3rd overall, noting that teams and riders were stronger than when she won in 2024. At the Polish National Championships, Niewiadoma-Phinney won the road race title for the second time, having previously won it in 2016.

==== 2026 ====
In the spring classics, Niewiadoma-Phinney performed strongly, finishing 2nd at Omloop Het Nieuwsblad, Strade Bianche Donne and Amstel Gold Race, as well as 3rd at Liège–Bastogne–Liège Femmes. In May, it was rumoured that Niewiadoma-Phinney would move to the Lidl–Trek team for the 2027 season. On 7 August, Niewiadoma-Phinney won her first ever individual stage at the Tour de France Femmes by executing a solo ride to the summit of Mont Ventoux. She finished second in the general classification, claiming her fifth consecutive place on the podium in the race. At the UCI Road World Championships, she finished second to Vollering in a sprint finish, after a "gripping duel" on the final lap.

=== Lidl–Trek (2027–present) ===
In September 2026, Niewiadoma-Phinney announced she had signed a two-year contract with Lidl–Trek. Media noted she would be their general classification contender at major events.

== Personal life ==
Since 2016, Niewiadoma-Phinney has been in a relationship with American professional cyclist Taylor Phinney. The pair married in May 2024. The couple reside in Boulder, Colorado.

== Major results ==
=== Gravel ===
2023
1st UCI World Championships
1st Big Sugar

=== Road ===
2011
Klomnice

1st Road race
9th Time trial

UEC European Junior Championships

8th Road race
10th Time trial

2012
2nd Time trial, National Junior Championships
Klomnice

7th Time trial
8th Road race

2013
1st National Hill Climb Championships
2nd Overall Langenloiser Radrenntage (ARBO Cup)
Klomnice

3rd Road race
3rd Time trial

National Championships

4th Road race
4th Time trial

4th Overall Górski Walbrzyski Wyscig Kolarski
4th Cup of Poland – Postomino (ITT)
5th Road race, UEC European Under-23 Championships
7th Overall Tour de Feminin
10th Overall Holland Ladies Tour

1st Young rider classification

2014 (1 pro win)
1st GP du Canton d'Argovie
1st Frauen Prolog Grand Prix Gippingen
3rd Overall Tour of Norway

1st Mountains classification
1st Young rider classification

3rd Time trial, National Championships
8th Overall Giro della Toscana
8th Overall Holland Ladies Tour
9th Omloop van het Hageland
2015 (1)
UEC European Under-23 Championships

1st Road race
5th Time trial

1st Overall Emakumeen Euskal Bira

1st Mountains classification

2nd Road race, European Games
National Championships

2nd Time trial
4th Road race

2nd Durango-Durango Emakumeen Saria
UCI World Championships

3rd Team time trial
7th Road race

3rd Holland Hills Classic
5th Overall Giro d'Italia Femminile

1st Young rider classification

5th Overall Belgium Tour
5th La Flèche Wallonne
6th Strade Bianche
2016 (9)
UEC European Championships

1st Under-23 road race
2nd Road race

National Championships

1st Road race
1st Time trial

1st Young rider classification, UCI World Tour
1st Overall Grand Prix Elsy Jacobs

1st Young rider classification
1st Stage 2

1st Overall Giro del Trentino

1st Mountains classification
1st Young rider classification
1st Stages 1 & 2a (TTT)

1st Ronde van Gelderland
2nd Strade Bianche
4th GP de Plouay
4th La Flèche Wallonne
5th Overall Holland Ladies Tour

1st Points classification
1st Young rider classification
1st Stages 3 & 6

6th Road race, Olympic Games
7th Overall Giro d'Italia Femminile

1st Young rider classification

7th Trofeo Alfredo Binda
8th Giro dell'Emilia
10th Tour of Flanders
2017 (2)
1st Overall The Women's Tour

1st Stage 1

2nd Strade Bianche
3rd Amstel Gold Race
3rd Overall UCI Women's World Tour
3rd La Flèche Wallonne
3rd Liège–Bastogne–Liège
5th Road race, UCI World Championships
6th Overall Giro d'Italia Femminile
7th Overall Holland Ladies Tour
8th Tour of Flanders
8th Trofeo Alfredo Binda
9th Dwars door Vlaanderen
9th La Course by Le Tour de France
2018 (3)
1st Overall Tour Cycliste Féminin International de l'Ardèche

1st Mountains classification
1st Combination classification
1st Stage 5

1st Trofeo Alfredo Binda
2nd Strade Bianche
3rd Overall Tour of California
5th Overall Tour of Norway

1st Mountains classification

6th La Course by Le Tour de France
7th Overall Setmana Ciclista Valenciana
7th Overall Giro Rosa
8th Dwars door Vlaanderen
9th Tour of Flanders
10th GP de Plouay
2019 (2)
1st Amstel Gold Race
2nd Overall The Women's Tour

1st Mountains classification
1st Stage 4

3rd Strade Bianche
4th Overall Tour of Norway
5th Overall Tour of California
5th Overall Giro Rosa

1st Stage 1 (TTT)

6th Trofeo Alfredo Binda
6th Tour of Flanders
6th La Flèche Wallonne
6th Liège–Bastogne–Liège
10th Dwars door Vlaanderen
2020
2nd Overall Giro Rosa
3rd Road race, UEC European Championships
4th La Course by Le Tour de France
7th Road race, UCI World Championships
10th La Flèche Wallonne
2021
2nd La Flèche Wallonne
2nd Dwars door Vlaanderen
3rd Road race, UCI World Championships
4th Road race, UEC European Championships
4th Trofeo Alfredo Binda
4th Liège–Bastogne–Liège
4th Durango-Durango Emakumeen Saria
6th Overall Challenge by La Vuelta
6th La Course by Le Tour de France
8th Overall BeNe Ladies Tour
9th Strade Bianche
10th Overall Vuelta a Burgos
10th Amstel Gold Race
2022
2nd Brabantse Pijl
3rd Overall Tour de France
3rd Overall The Women's Tour
4th Strade Bianche
5th Amstel Gold Race
6th Overall Setmana Ciclista Valenciana
8th Road race, UCI World Championships
8th Tour of Flanders
9th Liège–Bastogne–Liège
10th Overall Challenge by La Vuelta
2023
3rd Overall Tour de France

1st Mountains classification
Combativity award Stage 7

3rd Overall Itzulia Women
4th Overall Tour de Suisse
4th Amstel Gold Race
5th Tour of Flanders
6th Strade Bianche
10th Overall La Vuelta Femenina
2024 (2)
1st Overall Tour de France
1st La Flèche Wallonne
2nd Overall Setmana Ciclista Valenciana
2nd Tour of Flanders
4th Strade Bianche
5th Liège–Bastogne–Liège
7th Omloop Het Nieuwsblad
8th Road race, Olympic Games
2025 (1)
National Championships

1st Road race
2nd Time trial

3rd Overall Tour de France
3rd Overall Tour de Suisse
4th Tour of Flanders
4th La Flèche Wallonne
9th Liège–Bastogne–Liège
10th Road race, UCI World Championships
2026
2nd Overall Tour de France

1st Stage 7
Held after Stage 7
Combativity award Stage 7 & Overall

2nd Road race, UCI World Championships
2nd Omloop Het Nieuwsblad
2nd Strade Bianche
2nd Amstel Gold Race
3rd Liège–Bastogne–Liège
3rd Overall Tour de Suisse
4th La Flèche Wallonne
5th Overall UAE Tour
8th Overall La Vuelta Femenina

==== General classification results timeline ====
Major Tour general classification results
Stage race	2013	2014	2015	2016	2017	2018	2019	2020	2021	2022	2023	2024	2025	2026
La Vuelta Femenina	DNE		—	—	—	—	—	—	—	—	10	DNF	11	8
Giro d'Italia	—	11	5	7	6	7	5	2	—	—	—	—	—	—
Tour de France	Race did not exist									3	3	1	3	2
Major stage races general classification results
Stage race	2013	2014	2015	2016	2017	2018	2019	2020	2021	2022	2023	2024	2025	2026
Itzulia Women	Race did not exist									—	3	—	—	—
Vuelta a Burgos	Race did not exist						—	NH	10	11	—	—	—	—
Tour of Britain	DNE	—	—	—	1	20	2	NH	—	3	NH	—	—	—
Tour de Suisse	Race did not exist									—	4	4	3	3
Simac Ladies Tour	10	8	—	5	7	—	13	NH	13	—	6	—	—	—
Tour de Romandie	Race did not exist								—	—	2	—	—	—
Other stage races general classification results
Grand Prix Elsy Jacobs	—	27	14	1	—	—	—	NH	—	—	—	NH		—
Tour of California	DNE		—	—	—	3	5	Not held						
Emakumeen Euskal Bira	—	—	1	—	—	—	—	Not held						
Giro del Trentino	DNF	—	—	1	—	Not held								
Thüringen Ladies Tour	—	—	—	—	—	—	—	NH	—	—	—	7	NH	—
Belgium Tour	—	—	5	—	—	—	—	NH	—	—	Not held			—
Tour of Norway	—	3	15	—	15	5	4	NH	—	Not held				

==== Classics results timeline ====
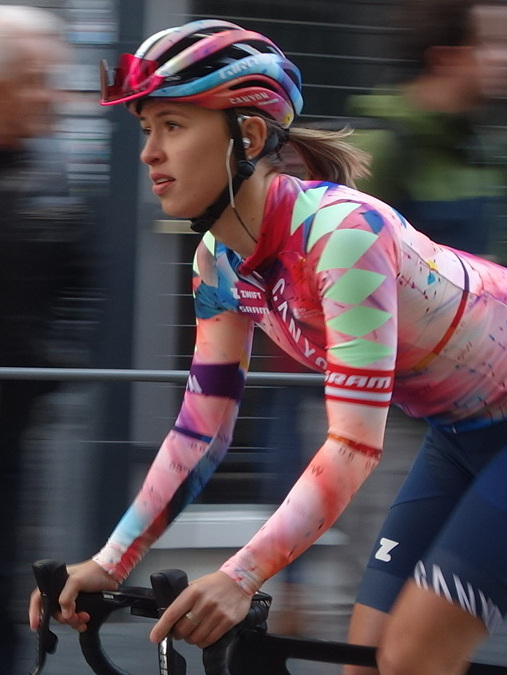
Niewiadoma at the 2022 Amstel Gold Race, where she finished in fifth place – one of five top-five finishes she has recorded at the race.

Monument	2013	2014	2015	2016	2017	2018	2019	2020	2021	2022	2023	2024	2025	2026
Milan–San Remo	Not held												15	DNF
Tour of Flanders	—	—	22	10	8	9	6	—	20	8	5	2	4	—
Paris–Roubaix	Race did not exist							NH	DNF	—	—	—	—	—
Liège–Bastogne–Liège	Race did not exist				3	14	6	19	4	9	11	5	9	3
Classic	2013	2014	2015	2016	2017	2018	2019	2020	2021	2022	2023	2024	2025	2026
Omloop Het Nieuwsblad	—	—	16	DNF	12	—	17	—	18	41	24	7	37	2
Strade Bianche	DNE		6	2	2	2	3	DNF	9	4	6	4	DNF	2
Gent–Wevelgem	—	—	—	—	17	—	84	—	37	31	42	—	—	—
Trofeo Alfredo Binda	36	DNF	13	7	8	1	6	NH	4	—	15	—	—	11
Amstel Gold Race	Race did not exist				3	29	1	NH	10	5	4	20	33	2
La Flèche Wallonne	—	15	5	4	3	21	6	10	2	12	11	1	4	4
GP de Plouay	—	—	48	4	—	10	—	DNF	—	—	—	—	—	
Open de Suède Vårgårda	—	—	21	—	13	—	—	Not held		—	Not held			
Ronde van Drenthe	—	—	—	—	—	—	—	NH	—	—	—	—	—	

==== Major championships results ====
Event		2013	2014	2015	2016	2017	2018	2019	2020	2021	2022	2023	2024	2025
Olympic Games	Time trial	Not held			18	Not held				—	Not held		—	NH
Olympic Games	Road race	Not held			6	Not held				14	Not held		8	NH
World Championships	Time trial	—	—	—	—	—	—	—	—	—	—	—	—	14
World Championships	Road race	DNF	11	5	35	5	12	23	7	3	8	DNS	17	10
European Championships	Time trial	Race did not exist			—	—	—	—	—	—	—	17	—	—
European Championships	Road race	Race did not exist			2	—	—	—	3	4	—	11	—	2
National Championships	Time trial	4	3	2	1	—	—	—	—	—	—	—	—	2
National Championships	Road race	4	8	4	1	—	—	—	—	—	—	—	—	1

Legend
—	Did not compete
DNF	Did not finish
DNS	Did not start
DNE	Did not exist
IP	In progress
NH	Not held
