= 2025 European Road Championships – Women's road race =

Women's road race
2025 European Road Championships

Race details
- Dates: 4 October 2025
- Stages: 1
- Distance: 116.1 km (72.14 mi)
- Winning time: 2:57:53

Medalists
	Gold	Demi Vollering (NED)
	Silver	Katarzyna Niewiadoma (POL)
	Bronze	Anna van der Breggen (NED)

The women's elite road race at the 2025 European Road Championships took place on 4 October 2025, in Guilherand-Granges, France.

== Results ==
Rank	#	Cyclist	Nation	Time / Diff.
1st place, gold medalist(s)	8	Demi Vollering	Netherlands	2:57:53
2nd place, silver medalist(s)	31	Katarzyna Niewiadoma	Poland	+1:18
3rd place, bronze medalist(s)	7	Anna van der Breggen	Netherlands	+1:24
4	15	Elise Chabbey	Switzerland	+2:31
5	56	Franziska Koch	Germany	s.t.
6	24	Juliette Labous	France	s.t.
7	39	Mavi García	Spain	s.t.
8	58	Antonia Niedermaier	Germany	+3:08
9	23	Cédrine Kerbaol	France	+4:38
10	10	Elisa Longo Borghini	Italy	+4:42
11	64	Urška Žigart	Slovenia	+5:37
12	21	Marion Bunel	France	+6:23
13	44	Sigrid Ytterhus Haugset	Norway	s.t.
14	1	Mischa Bredewold	Netherlands	+6:24
15	47	Lotte Claes	Belgium	+6:54
16	4	Riejanne Markus	Netherlands	+7:04
17	28	Évita Muzic	France	+7:34
18	37	Mireia Benito	Spain	s.t.
19	65	Caroline Andersson	Sweden	s.t.
20	19	Noemi Rüegg	Switzerland	s.t.
21	53	Ricarda Bauernfeind	Germany	+7:36
22	12	Barbara Malcotti	Italy	s.t.
23	5	Pauliena Rooijakkers	Netherlands	+7:39
24	14	Silvia Persico	Italy	s.t.
25	2	Femke de Vries	Netherlands	+8:03
26	46	Mie Bjørndal Ottestad	Norway	+8:08
27	51	Julie Van de Velde	Belgium	+8:37
28	59	Carina Schrempf	Austria	+9:12
29	70	Cecilie Uttrup Ludwig	Denmark	s.t.
30	11	Erica Magnaldi	Italy	s.t.
31	36	Dominika Włodarczyk	Poland	s.t.
32	6	Shirin van Anrooij	Netherlands	s.t.
33	73	Yuliia Biriukova	Ukraine	+9:15
34	9	Eleonora Gasparrini	Italy	+10:24
35	22	Léa Curinier	France	+12:17
36	17	Steffi Häberlin	Switzerland	s.t.
37	82	Raquel Queirós	Portugal	s.t.
DNF	25	Célia Le Mouel	France	
DNF	26	Marie Le Net	France	
DNF	27	Dilyxine Miermont	France	
DNF	29	Natalia Krześlak	Poland	
DNF	30	Marta Lach	Poland	
DNF	32	Karolina Perekitko	Poland	
DNF	33	Nikol Płosaj	Poland	
DNF	3	Femke Gerritse	Netherlands	
DNF	34	Kaja Rysz	Poland	
DNF	35	Agnieszka Skalniak-Sójka	Poland	
DNF	38	Yurani Blanco	Spain	
DNF	40	Ariana Gilabert	Spain	
DNF	41	Sara Martín	Spain	
DNF	42	Maite Urteaga	Spain	
DNF	45	Tiril Jørgensen	Norway	
DNF	48	Audrey de Keersmaeker	Belgium	
DNF	50	Marieke Meert	Belgium	
DNF	52	Margot Vanpachtenbeke	Belgium	
DNF	54	Franziska Brauße	Germany	
DNF	55	Romy Kasper	Germany	
DNF	60	Christina Schweinberger	Austria	
DNF	61	Fiona Mangan	Ireland	
DNF	62	Caoimhe O'Brien	Ireland	
DNF	63	Eugenia Bujak	Slovenia	
DNF	66	Julia Borgström	Sweden	
DNF	67	Veronika Jandová	Czechia	
DNF	68	Rebecca Koerner	Denmark	
DNF	69	Christina Bragh Lorenzen	Denmark	
DNF	71	Petra Zsankó	Hungary	
DNF	72	Nora Jenčušová	Slovakia	
DNF	75	Olga Shekel	Ukraine	
DNF	76	Nina Berton	Luxembourg	
DNF	77	Aidi Gerde Tuisk	Estonia	
DNF	78	Rasa Leleivytė	Lithuania	
DNF	79	Argiro Milaki	Greece	
DNF	80	Melike Çakır	Turkey	
DNF	81	Reyhan Yakişir	Turkey	
DNF	83	Tamara Dronova	Individual Neutral Athletes	
DNF	84	Natalia Frolova	Individual Neutral Athletes	
DNF	13	Soraya Paladin	Italy	
DNF	20	Linda Zanetti	Switzerland	
DNF	85	Valentina Venerucci	San Marino	
DNS	43	Susanne Andersen	Norway	
DNS	49	Justine Ghekiere	Belgium	
DNS	57	Liane Lippert	Germany	
DNS	74	Olha Kulynych	Ukraine	
DNS	16	Elena Hartmann	Switzerland	
DNS	18	Marlen Reusser	Switzerland	
