= Tour of Britain Women =

British multi-day road cycling race

Race details
- Date: May or June
- Region: Great Britain
- Discipline: Road
- Competition: UCI Women's World Tour
- Type: Stage race
- Organiser: British Cycling
- Web site: www.britishcycling.org.uk/tourofbritain

History
- First edition: 2014
- Editions: 11 (as of 2026)
- First winner: Marianne Vos (NED)
- Most wins: Lizzie Deignan (GBR) (2 wins)
- Most recent: Kim Le Court-Pienaar (MRI)

The Tour of Britain Women is a women's cycle stage race held in England and Wales, as part of the UCI Women's World Tour. From 2014 to 2023 the race was organised by SweetSpot, the company behind the men's Tour of Britain, and was known as The Women's Tour.

== History ==
The origins of the race trace back to 2010 when SweetSpot, the organisers of the men's Tour of Britain organised their first women's cycling race, the Horizon Fitness Grand Prix in Stoke-on-Trent. What began as a supporting event for the men's Tour Series – Britain's leading televised cycle race series – grew into a key part of the women's racing scene in Britain, thanks to television coverage on ITV4 in the UK and around the world. In 2018, Britain's leading women's teams took part in the whole series for the first time.

At the launch of the 2013 Tour of Britain, SweetSpot MD Chairman Hugh Roberts and director Guy Elliott announced the company's intentions to create a standalone stage race for the world's top female cyclists in Britain – the first event of its kind. As a prelude to the inaugural race in 2014, a women's one-day race was held on the final day of the 2013 Tour of Britain in London, won by Hannah Barnes.

=== The Women's Tour ===
In October 2013, it was announced that the Women's Tour had been granted a place on the UCI calendar for May 2014, being granted what was the highest possible ranking for a stage race (2.1) at the time. This put it instantly on a par with the world's top races for women. The first edition was a widely acclaimed success, attracting the world's top riders and teams and widespread media coverage for women's cycling in the UK.

While the first edition of the race took place in May, the second edition in 2015 moved to a mid-June position, a slot it has held on the UCI calendar ever since – with the exception of the 2021 edition, where it was delayed to October due to the COVID-19 pandemic.

In 2016, the race became a part of the inaugural UCI Women's World Tour, the leading series of races for professional women cyclists.

In 2017, the finished in London for the first time in race history, with Belgian rider Jolien D'Hoore winning the stage. Wales hosted the race for the first time in 2018, with the final stage taking place between Dolgellau and Colwyn Bay. The Women's Tour expanded to six days for the first time in 2019. The increase in days also heralded a slight shift of event days, as the race ran from Monday to Saturday.

SweetSpot announced in March 2020 that the planned seventh edition of the race, scheduled to take place between Monday 8 and Saturday 13 June, was postponed owing to the COVID-19 pandemic. The race's Grand Départ in Bicester, Oxfordshire and final stage in Suffolk had already been announced. Organisers said that they "hope to work with the UCI and British Cycling to find an alternative date in the international cycling calendar for the race to take place should conditions permit." On 4 May, the 2020 Tour was cancelled. In February 2021, the 2021 Women's Tour was postponed from June to October.

The 2022 race returned to its traditional calendar slot in June, with a mountain top finish at Black Mountain in the Brecon Beacons.

SweetSpot announced the 2023 race route on 9 March 2023, but warned that the loss of key sponsors (such as previous vehicle partner Škoda) and increased running costs (20% higher than 2022 race) had left a shortfall in funding and that urgent additional income was required to ensure that the race could go ahead. On 31 March 2023, SweetSpot announced that the race would go on hiatus in 2023, in light of the above financial issues. In January 2024, organiser and promoter SweetSpot entered liquidation and the race was removed from the 2024 calendar.

=== Tour of Britain Women ===
In February 2024, British Cycling took over the running of the race, which was to be renamed as the Tour of Britain Women, and the race returned to the UCI Women's World Tour calendar but over a shorter four-day itinerary. In May 2024, the race gained sponsorship from Lloyds Bank – with the bank also sponsoring the men's Tour of Britain. The 2025 edition of the race also took place over four days, visiting Scotland for the first time. In 2026, the race was lengthened to five days (becoming equivalent in length to the men's event), as well as moving to August as opposed to June.

== Overall winners ==
Year	Country	Rider	Team
2014	Netherlands	Marianne Vos	Rabobank-Liv Woman Cycling Team
2015	Germany	Lisa Brennauer	Velocio–SRAM
2016	Great Britain	Lizzie Armitstead	Boels–Dolmans
2017	Poland	Katarzyna Niewiadoma	WM3 Energie
2018	United States	Coryn Rivera	Team Sunweb
2019	Great Britain	Lizzie Deignan	Trek–Segafredo
2020	No race due to the COVID-19 pandemic in the United Kingdom.		
2021	Netherlands	Demi Vollering	SD Worx
2022	Italy	Elisa Longo Borghini	Trek–Segafredo
2023	No race due to lack of funding.		
2024	Belgium	Lotte Kopecky	Team SD Worx–Protime
2025	New Zealand	Ally Wollaston	FDJ–Suez
2026	Mauritius	Kimberley Le Court-Pienaar	AG Insurance–Soudal

== Classification leaders jerseys ==
Classification	2014	2015	2016	2017	2018	2019	2021	2022	2024	2025
General										
Points										
Youth				Jersey replaced by sprints jersey						
Sprints	No award								No award	
Mountains										
British							Trophy			
Team		No award			No award		No award			

== Tour facts and figures ==
Overall winners

- Ten riders have won the eleven editions of the Tour of Britain Women since its inaugural 2014 race
- Lizzie Deignan is the sole double champion in race history to date – winning the 2016 and 2019 editions.
- Coryn Rivera became the first non-European rider to win the race overall when she triumphed in the 2018 edition.
- Katarzyna Niewiadoma in 2017 and Lotte Kopecky in 2024 are the only riders to lead an edition of the race from start to finish.
- The 2022 edition had the closest winning margin, with only one second separating winner Elisa Longo Borghini and runner-up Grace Brown. Longo Borghini's victory made her the oldest winner at 30 years, 184 days.
- Niewiadoma won the 2017 edition by the biggest margin to date: one minute and 18 seconds. She was also the youngest winner at 22 years, 256 days.

Stage winners

- Lorena Wiebes has won the most stages of the race to date: eleven.
- Three riders have won multiple stages of the race in the same year – Marianne Vos (three in 2014), Wiebes (three in 2022, two in 2021, four in 2026), Jolien D'Hoore (two in 2019) and Kopecky (two in 2024)
- Ten riders have won stages in more than one edition of the race – Vos (2014, 2016 and 2019); D'Hoore (2015, 2017 and 2018); Deignan (2015, 2016 and 2019); Wiebes (2021, 2022, 2024, 2025 and 2026); Christine Majerus ( 2015 and 2016); Amy Pieters (2016, 2017 and 2019); Lotta Henttala (2016 and 2018); Sarah Roy (2017 and 2018); Niewiadoma (2017 and 2019) and Kimberley Le Court (2025 and 2026).
- Twenty-seven different riders have won stages of the Tour of Britain Women – the most recent addition to the list being Cat Ferguson in Kelso in 2025.
- Fourteen different nationalities have won stages of the Tour of Britain Women. Dutch riders have won the most with twenty-one stage wins.

Host venues

- On average, 300,000 people watch the Tour of Britain Women from the roadside each year.
- An estimated 125,000 fans watched the race's finale in London in 2017 – the race used the same 6.2 km circuit around Regent Street St James, Piccadilly, Strand and Whitehall that featured in the Tour of Britain in 2015, 2016 and 2018.
- Atherstone (four stage starts and one finish) has hosted the race more than any other venue.
- Suffolk has hosted the race more times than any other county: seven.
- Wales hosted its first stage when stage five of the 2018 edition took place between Dolgellau and Colwyn Bay. The country then welcomed the final two days of the 2019 race, which took place in Powys and Carmarthenshire. It again hosted two stages in 2022, 2024 and 2026.
- Scotland hosted its first stages when stages three and four of the 2025 edition took place in Kelso and Glasgow respectively. It also hosted a stage in 2026.
