= 2017 The Women's Tour =

Cycling race

2017 UCI Women's World Tour, race 11 of 20
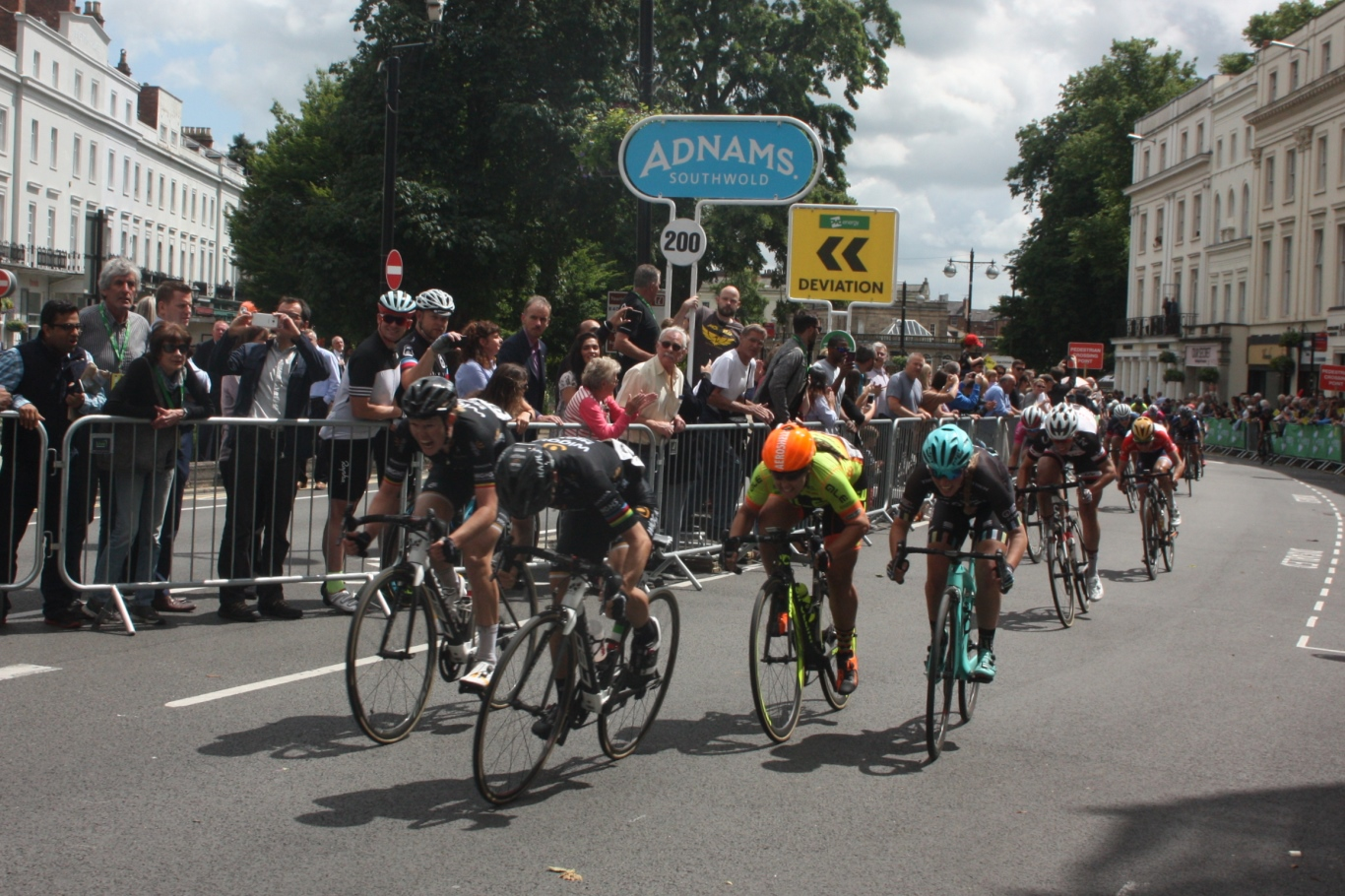
- The sprint for the finishing line on stage 3

Race details
- Dates: 7–11 June 2017
- Stages: 5
- Distance: 627.9 km (390.2 mi)
- Winning time: 16h 34' 53"

Results
| Jersey awarded to the overall winner | Winner | Katarzyna Niewiadoma (POL) | (WM3 Energie) |
| | Second | Christine Majerus (LUX) | (Boels–Dolmans) |
| | Third | Hannah Barnes (GBR) | (Canyon//SRAM) |
| | Points | Christine Majerus (LUX) | (Boels–Dolmans) |
| Jersey awarded to the mountains classification winner | Mountains | Audrey Cordon (FRA) | (Wiggle High5) |
| Jersey awarded to the sprints classification winner | Sprints | Christine Majerus (LUX) | (Boels–Dolmans) |
| | Combativity | Lucinda Brand (NED) | (Team Sunweb) |
| | Team | Team Sunweb | |

The 2017 Ovo Energy Women's Tour was the fourth staging of The Women's Tour, a women's cycling stage race held in the United Kingdom. It ran from 7 to 11 June 2017, as part of the 2017 UCI Women's World Tour.

The race was won by Polish rider Katarzyna Niewiadoma, riding for the WM3 Energie team, who as a result, took the lead of the overall Women's World Tour standings. Niewiadoma held the race lead for the duration of the race, after winning the opening stage in Kettering following a solo break of nearly 50 kilometres (31 miles), ultimately winning the race overall by 78 seconds from Luxembourg's Christine Majerus (Boels–Dolmans), who won the points and sprints jerseys after consistent finishing. The podium was completed by Canyon//SRAM's Hannah Barnes.

Barnes moved onto the podium at the expense of Canada's Leah Kirchmann (Team Sunweb), after gaining twelve bonus seconds throughout the final stage; she also won the British rider classification as a result of this, having swapped the lead back-and-forth with sister Alice Barnes (Drops) throughout the race. In the other classifications, Audrey Cordon of Wiggle High5 held the lead of the mountains classification for the duration of the race, while Lucinda Brand (Team Sunweb) was deemed the most combative rider of the race while Team Sunweb were the winners of the teams classification.

== Teams ==
There are 17 teams participated in the 2017 Women's Tour. The top 15 UCI Women's World tour teams were automatically invited, and obliged to attend the race. On 15 February 2017, race organisers announced that Drops and Team WNT were invited to compete in the tour.

Competing teams

- Alé–Cipollini
- Bepink–Cogeas
- Boels–Dolmans
- Canyon//SRAM
- Cervélo–Bigla Pro Cycling
- Cylance Pro Cycling
- Drops
- FDJ Nouvelle-Aquitaine Futuroscope
- Team Hitec Products
- Lares–Waowdeals
- Lensworld–Kuota
- Orica–Scott
- Team Sunweb
- Wiggle High5
- WM3 Energie
- Team WNT
- Team VéloCONCEPT

== Route ==
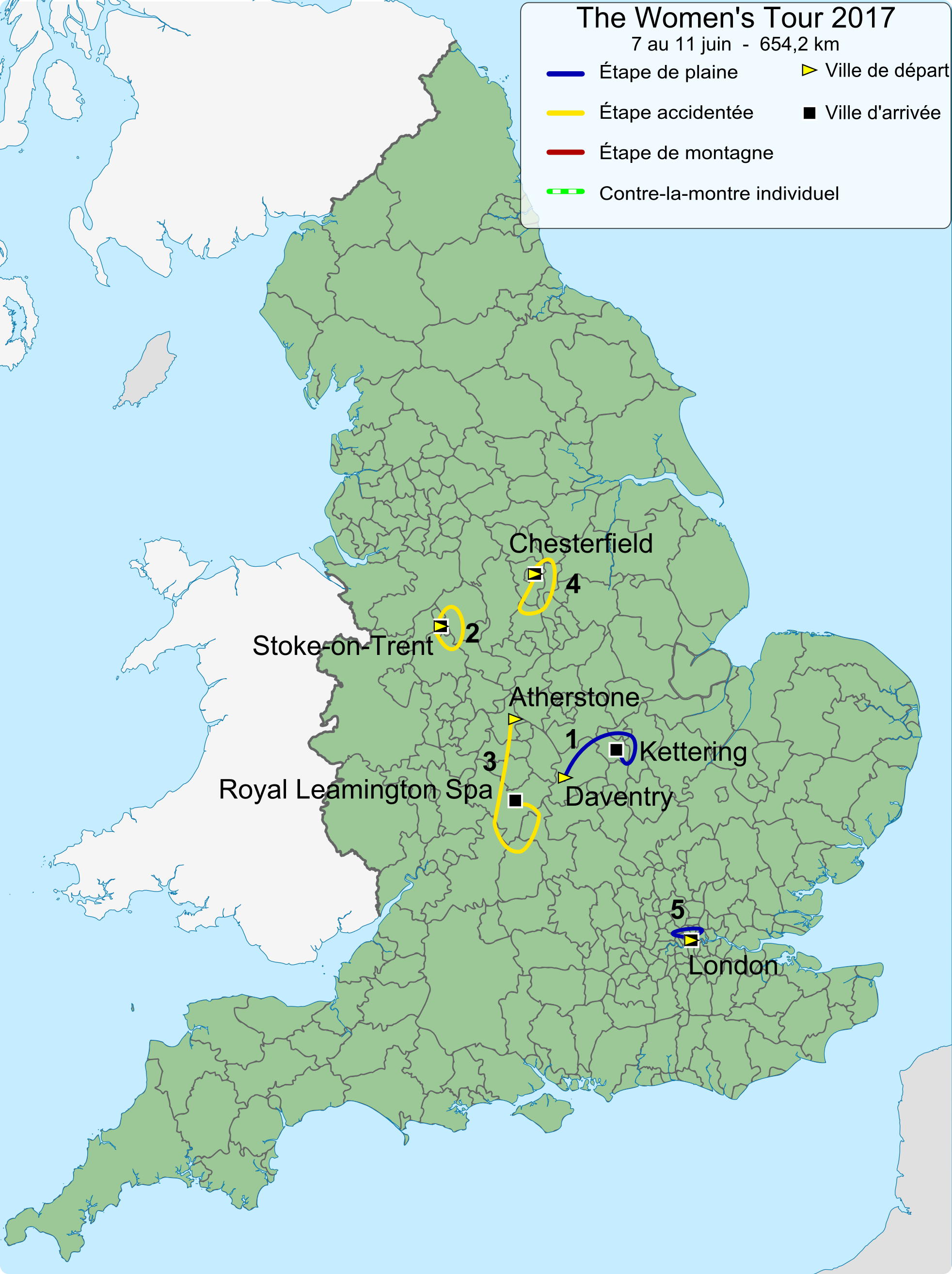
The route

On 15 February, the route for the race was revealed. The 2017 Tour began with a stage between Daventry and Kettering in Northamptonshire. The second stage featured Stoke-on-Trent and Staffordshire before a third stage between Atherstone and Leamington Spa. The fourth stage started and finished in Chesterfield before the final stage took place in London on the same 6.2-kilometre (3.9 mi) circuit that is used in the Tour of Britain.

Stage schedule
| Stage | Date | Course | Distance | Type | Winner |
|---|---|---|---|---|---|
| 1 | 7 June | Daventry to Kettering | 147.5 km (91.7 mi) | Flat stage | Katarzyna Niewiadoma (POL) |
| 2 | 8 June | Stoke-on-Trent to Stoke-on-Trent | 144.5 km (89.8 mi) | Hilly stage | Amy Pieters (NED) |
| 3 | 9 June | Atherstone to Leamington Spa | 150.8 km (93.7 mi) | Hilly stage | Chloe Hosking (AUS) |
| 4 | 10 June | Chesterfield to Chesterfield | 123.1 km (76.5 mi) | Hilly stage | Sarah Roy (AUS) |
| 5 | 11 June | London to London | 62 km (38.5 mi) (Note: Initially scheduled for 86.8 km (53.9 mi), but reduced for undisclosed reasons.) | Flat stage | Jolien D'Hoore (BEL) |

== Stages ==
=== Stage 1 ===
7 June 2017 — Daventry to Kettering, 147.5 km (91.7 mi)

Stage 1 result
| Rank | Rider | Team | Time |
|---|---|---|---|
| 1 | Katarzyna Niewiadoma (POL) | WM3 Energie | 3h 51' 39" |
| 2 | Marianne Vos (NED) | WM3 Energie | + 1' 42" |
| 3 | Christine Majerus (LUX) | Boels–Dolmans | + 1' 42" |
| 4 | Giorgia Bronzini (ITA) | Wiggle High5 | + 1' 42" |
| 5 | Tiffany Cromwell (AUS) | Canyon//SRAM | + 1' 42" |
| 6 | Christina Siggaard (DEN) | Team VéloCONCEPT | + 1' 42" |
| 7 | Alice Barnes (GBR) | Drops | + 1' 42" |
| 8 | Ashleigh Moolman (RSA) | Cervélo–Bigla Pro Cycling | + 1' 42" |
| 9 | Maria Giulia Confalonieri (ITA) | Lensworld–Kuota | + 1' 42" |
| 10 | Roxane Fournier (FRA) | FDJ Nouvelle-Aquitaine Futuroscope | + 1' 42" |

General classification after Stage 1
| Rank | Rider | Team | Time |
|---|---|---|---|
| 1 | Katarzyna Niewiadoma (POL) | WM3 Energie | 3h 51' 29" |
| 2 | Marianne Vos (NED) | WM3 Energie | + 1' 46" |
| 3 | Christine Majerus (LUX) | Boels–Dolmans | + 1' 48" |
| 4 | Giorgia Bronzini (ITA) | Wiggle High5 | + 1' 52" |
| 5 | Tiffany Cromwell (AUS) | Canyon//SRAM | + 1' 52" |
| 6 | Christina Siggaard (DEN) | Team VéloCONCEPT | + 1' 52" |
| 7 | Alice Barnes (GBR) | Drops | + 1' 52" |
| 8 | Ashleigh Moolman (RSA) | Cervélo–Bigla Pro Cycling | + 1' 52" |
| 9 | Maria Giulia Confalonieri (ITA) | Lensworld–Kuota | + 1' 52" |
| 10 | Roxane Fournier (FRA) | FDJ Nouvelle-Aquitaine Futuroscope | + 1' 52" |

=== Stage 2 ===
8 June 2017 — Stoke-on-Trent to Stoke-on-Trent, 144.5 km (89.8 mi)

Stage 2 result
| Rank | Rider | Team | Time |
|---|---|---|---|
| 1 | Amy Pieters (NED) | Boels–Dolmans | 3h 49' 42" |
| 2 | Hannah Barnes (GBR) | Canyon//SRAM | + 0" |
| 3 | Ellen van Dijk (NED) | Team Sunweb | + 0" |
| 4 | Marianne Vos (NED) | WM3 Energie | + 0" |
| 5 | Katarzyna Niewiadoma (POL) | WM3 Energie | + 0" |
| 6 | Elisa Longo Borghini (ITA) | Wiggle High5 | + 0" |
| 7 | Ashleigh Moolman (RSA) | Cervélo–Bigla Pro Cycling | + 0" |
| 8 | Alice Barnes (GBR) | Drops | + 0" |
| 9 | Dani King (GBR) | Cylance Pro Cycling | + 0" |
| 10 | Aude Biannic (FRA) | FDJ Nouvelle-Aquitaine Futuroscope | + 0" |

General classification after Stage 2
| Rank | Rider | Team | Time |
|---|---|---|---|
| 1 | Katarzyna Niewiadoma (POL) | WM3 Energie | 7h 41' 11" |
| 2 | Marianne Vos (NED) | WM3 Energie | + 1' 46" |
| 3 | Hannah Barnes (GBR) | Canyon//SRAM | + 1' 46" |
| 4 | Ellen van Dijk (NED) | Team Sunweb | + 1' 48" |
| 5 | Amy Pieters (NED) | Boels–Dolmans | + 1' 48" |
| 6 | Ashleigh Moolman (RSA) | Cervélo–Bigla Pro Cycling | + 1' 52" |
| 7 | Alice Barnes (GBR) | Drops | + 1' 52" |
| 8 | Christine Majerus (LUX) | Boels–Dolmans | + 1' 55" |
| 9 | Cecilie Uttrup Ludwig (DEN) | Cervélo–Bigla Pro Cycling | + 1' 58" |
| 10 | Dani King (GBR) | Cylance Pro Cycling | + 1' 59" |

=== Stage 3 ===
9 June 2017 — Atherstone to Leamington Spa, 150.8 km (93.7 mi)

Stage 3 result
| Rank | Rider | Team | Time |
|---|---|---|---|
| 1 | Chloe Hosking (AUS) | Alé–Cipollini | 3h 57' 10" |
| 2 | Alice Barnes (GBR) | Drops | + 0" |
| 3 | Ellen van Dijk (NED) | Team Sunweb | + 0" |
| 4 | Giorgia Bronzini (ITA) | Wiggle High5 | + 0" |
| 5 | Christine Majerus (LUX) | Boels–Dolmans | + 0" |
| 6 | Hannah Barnes (GBR) | Canyon//SRAM | + 0" |
| 7 | Katie Archibald (GBR) | Team WNT | + 0" |
| 8 | Sara Penton (SWE) | Team VéloCONCEPT | + 0" |
| 9 | Emilie Moberg (NOR) | Team Hitec Products | + 0" |
| 10 | Alison Jackson (CAN) | Bepink–Cogeas | + 0" |

General classification after Stage 3
| Rank | Rider | Team | Time |
|---|---|---|---|
| 1 | Katarzyna Niewiadoma (POL) | WM3 Energie | 11h 38' 21" |
| 2 | Ellen van Dijk (NED) | Team Sunweb | + 1' 43" |
| 3 | Alice Barnes (GBR) | Drops | + 1' 46" |
| 4 | Hannah Barnes (GBR) | Canyon//SRAM | + 1' 46" |
| 5 | Marianne Vos (NED) | WM3 Energie | + 1' 46" |
| 6 | Ashleigh Moolman (RSA) | Cervélo–Bigla Pro Cycling | + 1' 52" |
| 7 | Christine Majerus (LUX) | Boels–Dolmans | + 1' 55" |
| 8 | Katie Archibald (GBR) | Team WNT | + 1' 56" |
| 9 | Cecilie Uttrup Ludwig (DEN) | Cervélo–Bigla Pro Cycling | + 1' 58" |
| 10 | Dani King (GBR) | Cylance Pro Cycling | + 1' 59" |

=== Stage 4 ===
10 June 2017 — Chesterfield to Chesterfield, 123.1 km (76.5 mi)

Stage 4 result
| Rank | Rider | Team | Time |
|---|---|---|---|
| 1 | Sarah Roy (AUS) | Orica–Scott | 3h 27' 48" |
| 2 | Christine Majerus (LUX) | Boels–Dolmans | + 1" |
| 3 | Leah Kirchmann (CAN) | Team Sunweb | + 5" |
| 4 | Marta Bastianelli (ITA) | Alé–Cipollini | + 17" |
| 5 | Hannah Barnes (GBR) | Canyon//SRAM | + 17" |
| 6 | Giorgia Bronzini (ITA) | Wiggle High5 | + 17" |
| 7 | Alexandra Manly (AUS) | Orica–Scott | + 17" |
| 8 | Ellen van Dijk (NED) | Team Sunweb | + 17" |
| 9 | Lucinda Brand (NED) | Team Sunweb | + 17" |
| 10 | Sofie De Vuyst (BEL) | Lares–Waowdeals | + 22" |

General classification after Stage 4
| Rank | Rider | Team | Time |
|---|---|---|---|
| 1 | Katarzyna Niewiadoma (POL) | WM3 Energie | 15h 06' 31" |
| 2 | Christine Majerus (LUX) | Boels–Dolmans | + 1' 25" |
| 3 | Leah Kirchmann (CAN) | Team Sunweb | + 1' 36" |
| 4 | Ellen van Dijk (NED) | Team Sunweb | + 1' 38" |
| 5 | Hannah Barnes (GBR) | Canyon//SRAM | + 1' 41" |
| 6 | Alice Barnes (GBR) | Drops | + 1' 46" |
| 7 | Ashleigh Moolman (RSA) | Cervélo–Bigla Pro Cycling | + 1' 52" |
| 8 | Cecilie Uttrup Ludwig (DEN) | Cervélo–Bigla Pro Cycling | + 1' 58" |
| 9 | Dani King (GBR) | Cylance Pro Cycling | + 1' 59" |
| 10 | Elisa Longo Borghini (ITA) | Wiggle High5 | + 2' 00" |

=== Stage 5 ===
11 June 2017 — London to London, 62 km (38.5 mi)

Stage 5 result
| Rank | Rider | Team | Time |
|---|---|---|---|
| 1 | Jolien D'Hoore (BEL) | Wiggle High5 | 1h 28' 23" |
| 2 | Hannah Barnes (GBR) | Canyon//SRAM | + 0" |
| 3 | Christine Majerus (LUX) | Boels–Dolmans | + 0" |
| 4 | Roxane Fournier (FRA) | FDJ Nouvelle-Aquitaine Futuroscope | + 0" |
| 5 | Katie Archibald (GBR) | Team WNT | + 0" |
| 6 | Marta Bastianelli (ITA) | Alé–Cipollini | + 0" |
| 7 | Giorgia Bronzini (ITA) | Wiggle High5 | + 0" |
| 8 | Anna van der Breggen (NED) | Boels–Dolmans | + 0" |
| 9 | Elena Cecchini (ITA) | Canyon//SRAM | + 0" |
| 10 | Alice Maria Arzuffi (ITA) | Lensworld–Kuota | + 0" |

Final general classification
| Rank | Rider | Team | Time |
|---|---|---|---|
| 1 | Katarzyna Niewiadoma (POL) | WM3 Energie | 16h 34' 53" |
| 2 | Christine Majerus (LUX) | Boels–Dolmans | + 1' 18" |
| 3 | Hannah Barnes (GBR) | Canyon//SRAM | + 1' 30" |
| 4 | Leah Kirchmann (CAN) | Team Sunweb | + 1' 36" |
| 5 | Ellen van Dijk (NED) | Team Sunweb | + 1' 39" |
| 6 | Alice Barnes (GBR) | Drops | + 1' 47" |
| 7 | Ashleigh Moolman (RSA) | Cervélo–Bigla Pro Cycling | + 1' 53" |
| 8 | Cecilie Uttrup Ludwig (DEN) | Cervélo–Bigla Pro Cycling | + 1' 59" |
| 9 | Dani King (GBR) | Cylance Pro Cycling | + 2' 00" |
| 10 | Elisa Longo Borghini (ITA) | Wiggle High5 | + 2' 01" |

== Classification leadership table ==
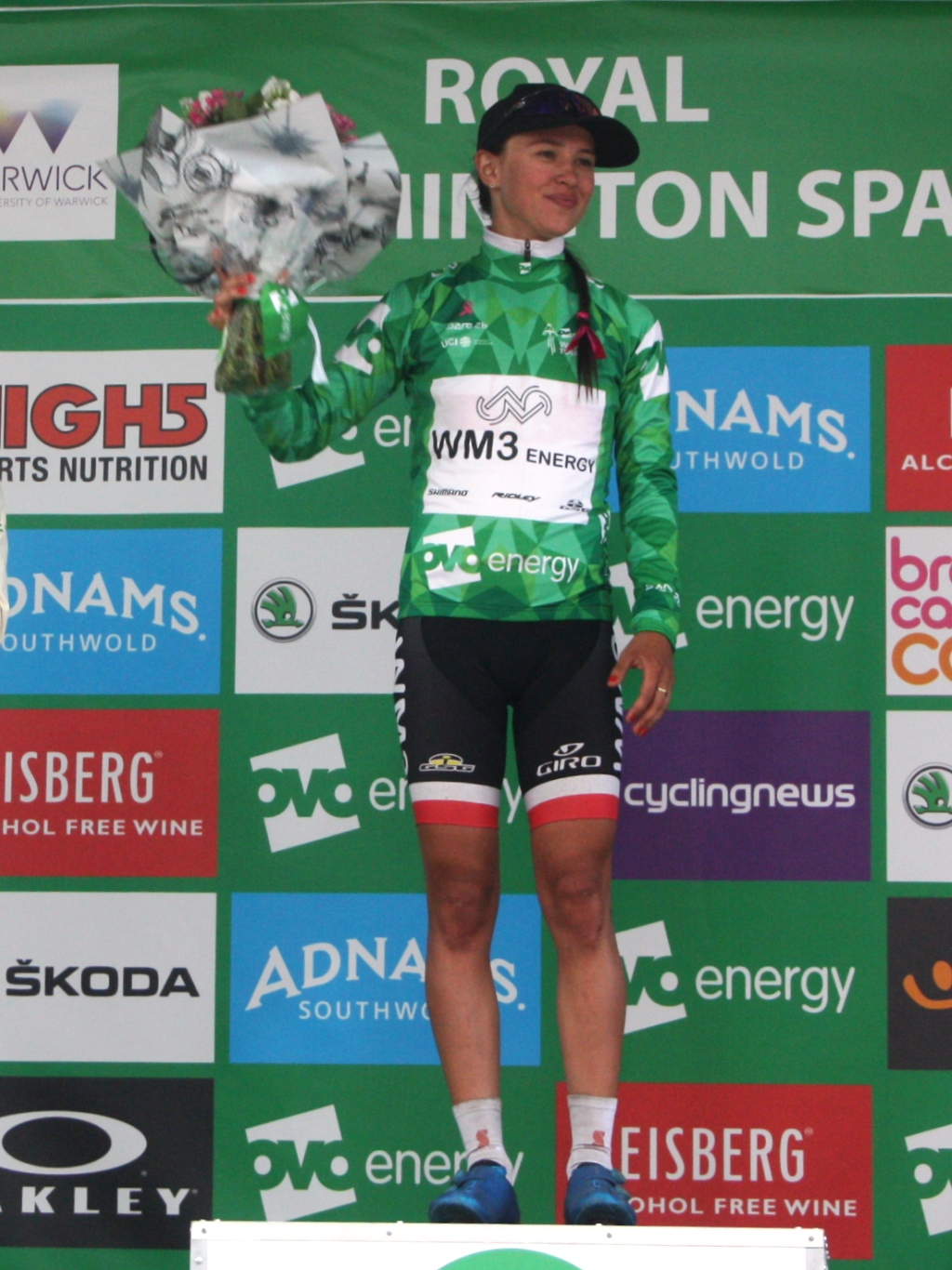
Katarzyna Niewiadoma (WM3 Energie), the winner of the general classification

In the Women's Tour, five different jerseys were awarded. The most important was the general classification, which was calculated by adding each cyclist's finishing times on each stage. Time bonuses were awarded to the first three finishers on all stages: the stage winner won a ten-second bonus, with six and four seconds for the second and third riders respectively.

Bonus seconds were also awarded to the first three riders at intermediate sprints; three seconds for the winner of the sprint, two seconds for the rider in second and one second for the rider in third. The rider with the least accumulated time is the race leader, identified by a green jersey. This classification was considered the most important of the 2017 Women's Tour and the winner of the classification was considered the winner of the race.

Additionally, there was a points classification, which awarded a white jersey, with black, blue and pink trim. In the points classification, cyclists received points for finishing in the top 10 in a stage. For winning a stage, a rider earned 15 points, with 12 for second, 9 for third, 7 for fourth with a point fewer per place down to a single point for 10th place.

There was also a sprints classification for the points awarded at intermediate sprints on each stage – awarded on a 3–2–1 scale – where the leadership of which was marked by a red jersey.

Points for the mountains classification
| Position | 1 | 2 | 3 | 4 | 5 | 6 | 7 | 8 | 9 | 10 |
|---|---|---|---|---|---|---|---|---|---|---|
| Points for Category 1 | 10 | 9 | 8 | 7 | 6 | 5 | 4 | 3 | 2 | 1 |
| Points for Category 2 | 6 | 5 | 4 | 3 | 2 | 1 | 0 | | | |
| Points for Category 3 | 4 | 3 | 2 | 1 | 0 | | | | | |

There was also a mountains classification, the leadership of which was marked by a predominantly black jersey. In the mountains classification, points towards the classification were won by reaching the top of a climb before other cyclists. Each climb was categorised as either first, second, or third-category, with more points available for the higher-categorised climbs. First-category climbs awarded the most points; the first ten riders were able to accrue points, compared with the first six on second-category climbs and the first four on third-category.

The fifth and final jersey represented the classification for British riders, marked by a light blue and pink jersey. This was decided the same way as the general classification, but only riders born in Great Britain were eligible to be ranked in the classification. There was also a team classification, in which the times of the best three cyclists per team on each stage were added together; the leading team at the end of the race was the team with the lowest total time.

Classification leadership by stage
| Stage | Winner | General classification | Points classification | Mountains classification | Sprints classification | British rider classification | Team classification |
|---|---|---|---|---|---|---|---|
| 1 | Katarzyna Niewiadoma | Katarzyna Niewiadoma | Katarzyna Niewiadoma | Audrey Cordon | Lisa Klein | Alice Barnes | WM3 Energie |
| 2 | Amy Pieters | Katarzyna Niewiadoma | Katarzyna Niewiadoma | Audrey Cordon | Lisa Klein | Hannah Barnes | Cervélo–Bigla Pro Cycling |
| 3 | Chloe Hosking | Katarzyna Niewiadoma | Katarzyna Niewiadoma | Audrey Cordon | Jolien D'Hoore | Alice Barnes | Cervélo–Bigla Pro Cycling |
| 4 | Sarah Roy | Katarzyna Niewiadoma | Christine Majerus | Audrey Cordon | Jolien D'Hoore | Hannah Barnes | Team Sunweb |
| 5 | Jolien D'Hoore | Katarzyna Niewiadoma | Christine Majerus | Audrey Cordon | Christine Majerus | Hannah Barnes | Team Sunweb |
| Final | | Katarzyna Niewiadoma | Christine Majerus | Audrey Cordon | Christine Majerus | Hannah Barnes | Team Sunweb |

== See also ==
- 2017 in women's road cycling
