= 2021 Dwars door Vlaanderen for Women =

Race details
- Dates: 31 March 2021
- Stages: 1
- Distance: 122.2 km (75.9 mi)
- Winning time: 3h 04' 04"

Results
	Winner	Annemiek van Vleuten (NED)	(Movistar Team)
	Second	Katarzyna Niewiadoma (POL)	(Canyon//SRAM)
	Third	Alexis Ryan (USA)	(Canyon//SRAM)

The 2021 Dwars door Vlaanderen for Women was a road cycling one-day race that took place on 31 April in Belgium. It was the ninth edition of the women's Dwars door Vlaanderen. The race started and finished in Waregem, and it was won by Annemiek van Vleuten (Movistar Team) ahead of Katarzyna Niewiadoma (Canyon//SRAM) in a sprint of two. Alexis Ryan (Canyon//SRAM) won the bunch sprint for third place.

== Teams ==
Eight UCI Women's WorldTeams and twenty UCI Women's Continental Teams competed in the race. Most teams started with 6 riders, making for a total of 164 riders of which there were 108 finishers within the time limit and two non-starters.

UCI Women's WorldTeams

- Alé BTC Ljubljana
- Canyon//SRAM
- FDJ Nouvelle-Aquitaine Futuroscope
- Liv Racing
- Movistar Team
- Team BikeExchange
- Team DSM
- Trek–Segafredo

UCI Women's Continental Teams

- Arkéa Pro Cycling Team
- A.R. Monex
- Bingoal Casino–Chevalmeire
- Bizkaia–Durango
- Bardiani–CSF–Faizanè
- Doltcini–Van Eyck–Proximus
- Drops–Le Col
- Lotto–Soudal Ladies
- Lviv Cycling Team
- Multum Accountants Ladies
- Massi–Tactic
- NXTG Racing
- Parkhotel Valkenburg
- Plantur–Pura
- Team Jumbo–Visma
- Team Coop–Hitec Products
- Team Rupelcleaning–Champion Lubricants
- Stade Rochelais Charente-Maritime
- Tibco–Silicon Valley Bank
- Valcar–Travel & Service

== Results ==
Result
Rank	Rider	Team	Time
1	Annemiek van Vleuten (NED)	Movistar Team	3h 04' 04"
2	Katarzyna Niewiadoma (POL)	Canyon//SRAM	+ 0"
3	Alexis Ryan (USA)	Canyon//SRAM	+ 19"
4	Vittoria Guazzini (ITA)	Valcar–Travel & Service	+ 19"
5	Alison Jackson (CAN)	Liv Racing	+ 19"
6	Grace Brown (AUS)	Team BikeExchange	+ 19"
7	Floortje Mackaij (NED)	Team DSM	+ 19"
8	Eugenia Bujak (SLO)	Alé BTC Ljubljana	+ 19"
9	Ellen van Dijk (NED)	Trek–Segafredo	+ 19"
10	Stine Borgli (NOR)	FDJ Nouvelle-Aquitaine Futuroscope	+ 19"

== See also ==
- 2021 in women's road cycling
