= 2023 UCI Gravel World Championships =

Gravel world championships in 2023

- Venue: Veneto, Italy
- Date: 7–8 October 2023

The 2023 UCI Gravel World Championships were held on 7 and 8 October 2023 in Veneto, Italy. It was the second time the gravel world championships were held.

== Medal summary ==
Event	Gold		Silver		Bronze	
Men's Events
Men elite	Matej Mohorič (SLO)	4h 53' 45"	Florian Vermeersch (BEL)	+ 45"	Connor Swift (GBR)	+ 3' 39"
Women's Events
Women elite	Katarzyna Niewiadoma (POL)	4h 49' 44"	Silvia Persico (ITA)	+ 32"	Demi Vollering (NED)	+ 32"
