= 2014 GP du Canton d'Argovie =

Race details
- Dates: 15 June 2013
- Stages: 1
- Distance: 113.1 km (70.3 mi)

The 2014 GP du Canton d'Argovie (Frauen Grand Prix Gippingen) the first running of the GP du Canton d'Argovie, a women's bicycle race in Gippingen, Switzerland. It was held on 10 June over a distance of 113.3 kilometres (70.4 miles). It was rated by the UCI as a 1.2 category race.

== Results ==
	Cyclist	Team	Time
1	Katarzyna Niewiadoma (POL)	Rabobank-Liv Woman Cycling Team	3h 04' 47"
2	Eugenia Bujak (POL)	BTC City Ljubljana	+ 16"
3	Roxane Knetemann (NED)	Rabobank-Liv Woman Cycling Team	+ 17"
4	Anna Plichta (POL)		+ 49"
5	Martina Ritter (AUT)	BTC City Ljubljana	+ 1' 06"
6	Reta Trotman (NZL)		+ 1' 08"
7	Doris Schweizer (SUI)	Astana BePink	+ 1' 35"
8	Natalia Boyarskaya (RUS)	Servetto Footon	+ 1' 37"
9	Sari Saarelainen (FIN)	Servetto Footon	+ 2' 42"
10	Jutta Stienen (SUI)		+ 2' 43"
