= 2016 Festival Luxembourgeois du cyclisme féminin Elsy Jacobs =

Women's cycling race in Luxembourg

The 2016 Festival Luxembourgeois du cyclisme féminin Elsy Jacobs was the ninth edition of the Festival Luxembourgeois du cyclisme féminin Elsy Jacobs, a women's road racing event in Luxembourg. It was won by Polish cyclist Katarzyna Niewiadoma.
