= Cycling at the 2015 European Games – Women's road race =

Women's road race at the 2015 European Games
- Date: 20 June
- Competitors: 67 from 30 nations
- Winning time: 3:20:36

Medalists
gold medal	Alena Amialiusik	Belarus
silver medal	Katarzyna Niewiadoma	Poland
bronze medal	Anna van der Breggen	Netherlands

The women's road race cycling event at the 2015 European Games in Baku took place on 20 June. It was won by Alena Amialiusik of Belarus.

== Results ==
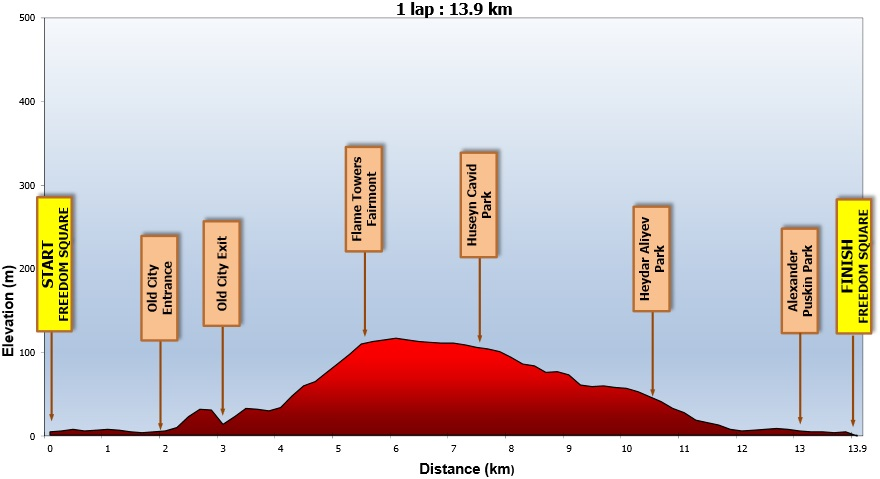
Course of the circuit of the road race

Rank	Rider	Nation	Time
1st place, gold medalist(s)	Alena Amialiusik	Belarus	3h 20' 36"
2nd place, silver medalist(s)	Katarzyna Niewiadoma	Poland	+ 0"
3rd place, bronze medalist(s)	Anna van der Breggen	Netherlands	+ 0"
4	Ellen van Dijk	Netherlands	+ 18"
5	Rossella Ratto	Italy	+ 2' 01"
6	Valentina Scandolara	Italy	+ 3' 41"
7	Annemiek van Vleuten	Netherlands	+ 3' 41"
8	Tatiana Antoshina	Russia	+ 3' 42"
9	Eugenia Bujak	Poland	+ 5' 17"
10	Hanna Solovey	Ukraine	+ 5' 17"
11	Elena Cecchini	Italy	+ 5' 17"
12	Sofie De Vuyst	Belgium	+ 5' 17"
13	Monika Brzeźna	Poland	+ 5' 17"
14	Daniela Reis	Portugal	+ 5' 17"
15	Volha Antonava	Belarus	+ 5' 17"
16	Jessie Daams	Belgium	+ 5' 17"
17	Elena Kuchinskaya	Russia	+ 5' 17"
18	Tetyana Ryabchenko	Ukraine	+ 5' 17"
19	Amy Pieters	Netherlands	+ 5' 17"
20	Tatsiana Sharakova	Belarus	+ 5' 17"
21	Polona Batagelj	Slovenia	+ 5' 17"
22	Martina Ritter	Austria	+ 5' 17"
23	Urša Pintar	Slovenia	+ 5' 17"
24	Lucinda Brand	Netherlands	+ 5' 17"
25	Daiva Tušlaitė	Lithuania	+ 5' 17"
26	Mónika Király	Hungary	+ 5' 17"
27	Tatiana Guderzo	Italy	+ 5' 17"
28	Paz Bash	Israel	+ 5' 21"
29	Aušrinė Trebaitė	Lithuania	+ 5' 21"
30	Anna Plichta	Poland	+ 5' 21"
31	Cecilie Gotaas Johnsen	Norway	+ 5' 21"
32	Olena Pavlukhina	Azerbaijan	+ 5' 21"
33	Annabelle Dreville	France	+ 5' 21"
34	Camilla Møllebro	Denmark	+ 5' 21"
35	Arianna Fidanza	Italy	+ 5' 21"
36	Anastasiia Iakovenko	Russia	+ 5' 21"
37	Oxana Kozonchuk	Russia	+ 13' 33"
38	Mia Radotić	Croatia	+ 13' 33"
39	Barbora Průdková	Czech Republic	+ 13' 33"
40	Jacqueline Hahn	Austria	+ 13' 33"
41	Liisi Rist	Estonia	+ 13' 33"
42	Sheyla Gutiérrez	Spain	+ 13' 33"
43	Kelly Druyts	Belgium	+ 13' 33"
44	Tereza Medveďová	Slovakia	+ 13' 33"
45	Sari Saarelainen	Finland	+ 13' 33"
46	Alena Sitsko	Belarus	+ 13' 33"
47	Dana Rožlapa	Latvia	+ 13' 33"
48	Ann-Sophie Duyck	Belgium	+ 13' 33"
49	Natalia Boyarskaya	Russia	+ 13' 33"
50	Ana Maria Covrig	Romania	+ 13' 33"
51	Kaat Hannes	Belgium	+ 13' 33"
—N/a	Varvara Fasoi	Greece	DNF
—N/a	Chantal Blaak	Netherlands	DNF
—N/a	Miriam Bjørnsrud	Norway	DNF
—N/a	Séverine Eraud	France	DNF
—N/a	Caroline Ryan	Ireland	DNF
—N/a	Olena Demydova	Ukraine	DNF
—N/a	Christina Siggaard	Denmark	DNF
—N/a	Fiona Dutriaux	France	DNF
—N/a	Fanny Riberot	France	DNF
—N/a	Soline Lamboley	France	DNF
—N/a	Michelle Vella Wood	Malta	DNF
—N/a	Aysenur Turgut	Turkey	DNF
—N/a	Lejla Tanović	Bosnia and Herzegovina	DNF
—N/a	Ksenyia Tuhai	Belarus	DNF
—N/a	Paulina Guz	Poland	DNF
—N/a	Ulfet Nazarli	Azerbaijan	DNF
