= Anna Plichta =

Polish cyclist (born 1992)

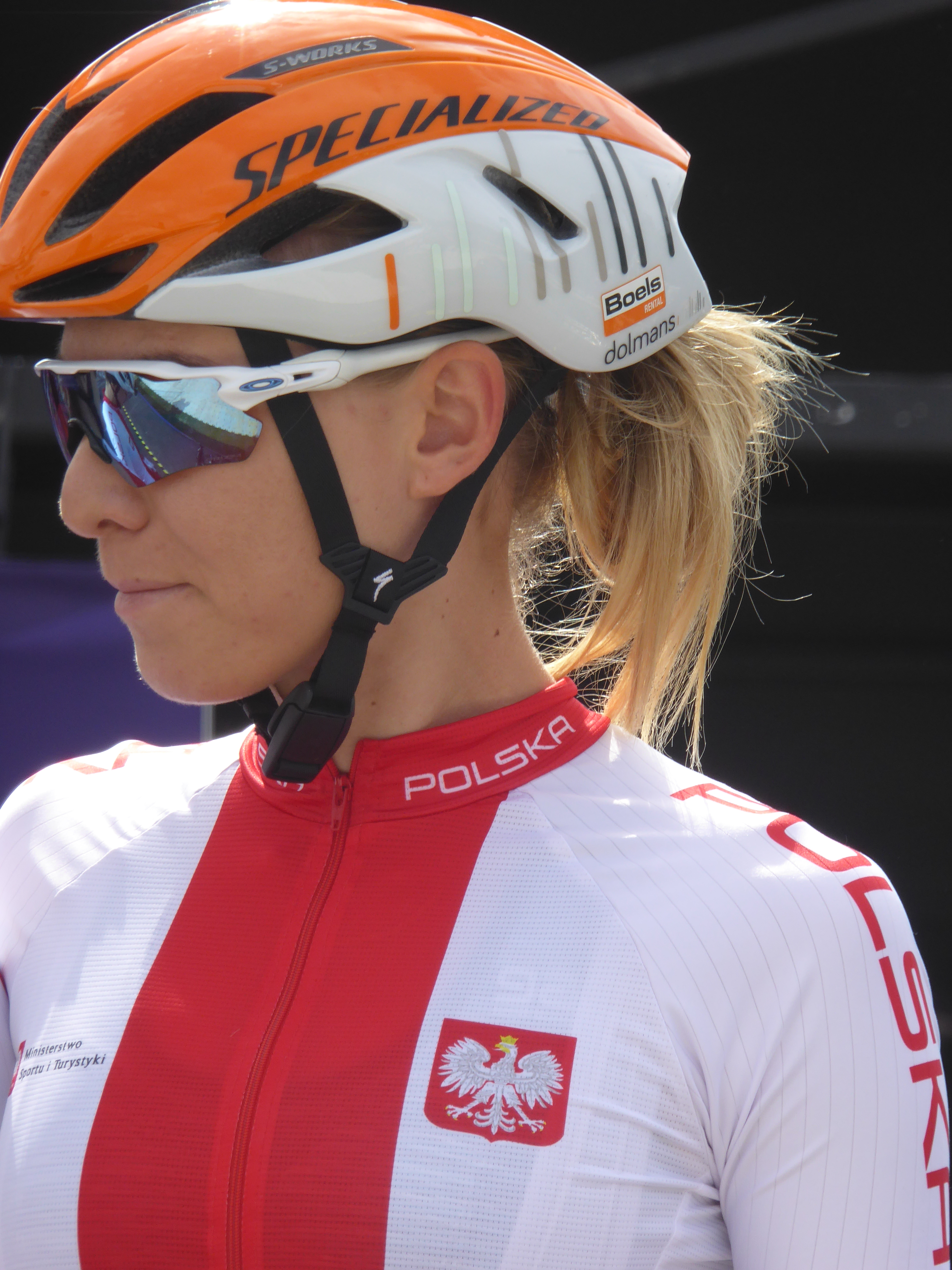
- Plichta at the 2018 European Road Cycling Championships.

Personal information
- Full name: Anna Plichta
- Born: 10 February 1992 (age 34) Wadowice, Poland

Cycling career
- Sport: Cycling
- Current team: Retired
- Discipline: Road
- Role: Rider

Amateur team
- 2014–2015: TKK Pacific Torun

Professional teams
- 2016: BTC City Ljubljana
- 2017: WM3 Energie
- 2018: Boels–Dolmans
- 2019–2020: Trek–Segafredo
- 2021: Lotto–Soudal Ladies

Anna Plichta (born 10 February 1992) is a Polish former racing cyclist, who rode professionally between 2016 and 2021 for five different teams. She rode at the UCI Road World Championships every year between 2014 and 2020, and also represented Poland at the 2015 European Games in the women's road race and women's time trial.

== Career ==
In September 2016 she was announced as part of the WM3 Energie squad for 2017. Plichta was meant to join Belgian team Lensworld–Kuota in 2018, but the team was disbanded in late October 2017 when their title sponsor Lensworld's new parent company, LensOnline decided to not continue sponsorship of the cycling team. After it was announced that Nikki Brammeier would leave Boels–Dolmans at the end of 2017 to concentrate on cyclo-cross, Plichta was offered the position on Boels–Dolmans in early November 2017.

Ahead of the 2021 season, Plichta joined the Lotto–Soudal Ladies team on a two-year contract, however she retired at the end of 2021.

== Personal life ==
Her favourite place to ride is the Polish mountains.

== Major results ==
2014
4th GP du Canton d'Argovie
10th Overall Internationale Thüringen Rundfahrt der Frauen

1st Young rider classification

2015
3rd Overall Tour de Feminin-O cenu Českého Švýcarska
7th Overall Belgium Tour
9th Overall Auensteiner–Radsporttage
2016
2nd Road race, National Road Championships
2nd Overall Tour de Feminin-O cenu Českého Švýcarska
5th Overall Tour of Zhoushan Island
2017
3rd Road race, National Road Championships
2019
1st Time trial, National Road Championships
4th Overall Gracia–Orlová
7th Overall Madrid Challenge by la Vuelta
2020
1st Time trial, National Road Championships
7th Time trial, UEC European Road Championships
