= List of 2018 UCI Women's Teams and riders =

This is a list of 2018 UCI Women's Teams and riders for the 2018 in women's road cycling season.

== Teams overview ==
List updated: 3 March 2018

The 2018 UCI Women's Teams are:

Code	Official team name	Country
ACT	Al Asayl Cycling Team	United Arab Emirates
ALE	Alé–Cipollini (2018 season)	Italy
VAI	Aromitalia Vaiano (2018 season)	Italy
ASA	Astana (2018 season)	Kazakhstan
BPK	Bepink (2018 season)	Italy
BDP	Bizkaia Durango–Euskadi Murias (2018 season)	Spain
DLT	Boels–Dolmans (2018 season)	Netherlands
BTC	BTC City Ljubljana (2018 season)	Slovenia
LPR2	Canyon//SRAM (2018 season)	Germany
CBT	Cervélo–Bigla Pro Cycling (2018 season)	Germany
GPC	China Chongming–Liv (2018 season)	Hong Kong
CGS	Cogeas–Mettler Pro Cycling Team (2018 season)	Russia
CZF	Conceria Zabri–Fanini (2018 season)	Albania
CPC	Cylance Pro Cycling (2018 season)	United States
DVE2	Doltcini–Van Eyck Sport (2018 season)	Belgium
SBT	Eurotarget–Bianchi–Vitasana (2018 season)	Italy
SVE	Experza–Footlogix (2018 season)	Belgium
FUT	FDJ Nouvelle-Aquitaine Futuroscope (2018 season)	France
HBS	Hagens Berman–Supermint (2018 season)	United States
HCT	Health Mate–Cyclelive Team (2018 season)	United States
HPU	Hitec Products–Birk Sport (2018 season)	Norway
LBL	Lotto–Soudal Ladies (2018 season)	Belgium
MCC	Minsk Cycling Club (2018 season)	Belarus
GEW2	Mitchelton–Scott (2018 season)	Australia
PHV	Parkhotel Valkenburg (2018 season)	Netherlands
RLW	Rally Cycling (2018 season)	United States
MIC	S.C. Michela Fanini Rox (2018 season)	Italy
SAS	Macogep–Argon18–Girondins (2018 season)	Canada
SEF	Servetto–Stradalli Cycle–Alurecycling (2018 season)	Italy
BMS	Team Virtu Cycling (2018 season)	Denmark
TLP	Team Sunweb (2018 season)	Netherlands
TIB	Tibco–Silicon Valley Bank (2018 season)	United States
TWC	Thailand Women's Cycling Team (2018 season)	Thailand
TOG	Top Girls Fassa Bortolo (2018 season)	Italy
T20	Twenty20 p/b Sho-Air (2018 season)	United States
UHC	UnitedHealthcare (2018 season)	United States
VAL	Valcar–PBM (2018 season)	Italy
DNA	DNA Pro Cycling (2018 season)	United States
WHT	Wiggle High5 (2018 season)	United Kingdom
DSB	WaowDeals Pro Cycling (2018 season)	Netherlands

== Defunct teams ==
The below lists all teams which folded completely at the end of the 2017 season, or dropped down from UCI level to National level.

- Vitalogic Astrokalb Radunion NÖ
- Xirayas de San Luis–OPW

== Riders ==
=== Al Asayl Cycling Team ===
Rider	Date of birth
Alyazia Al Nahyan (UAE)	1 January 1970 (age 56)
Nadin Almaskari (UAE)	1 January 1970 (age 56)
Shouq Alnowais (UAE)	1 January 1970 (age 56)
Renata Baymetova (UZB)	9 August 1998 (age 28)
Mandana Dehghan (IRN)	26 February 1991 (age 35)

Rider	Date of birth
Ekaterina Knebeleva (UZB)	13 December 1996 (age 29)
Grace Phang (MAS)	13 September 1985 (age 41)
Roisin Thomas (IRE)	17 April 1989 (age 37)
Ebtissam Zayed Ahmed (EGY)	25 September 1996 (age 30)

=== Alé–Cipollini ===
Rider	Date of birth
Marta Bastianelli (ITA)	30 April 1987 (age 39)
Janneke Ensing (NED)	21 September 1986 (age 40)
Sofia Frometa (ITA)	28 January 1999 (age 27)
Mayuko Hagiwara (JPN)	16 October 1986 (age 40)
Chloe Hosking (AUS)	1 October 1990 (age 36)
Romy Kasper (GER)	5 May 1988 (age 38)
Roxane Knetemann (NED)	1 April 1987 (age 39)
Soraya Paladin (ITA)	4 May 1993 (age 33)

Rider	Date of birth
Ane Santesteban (ESP)	12 December 1990 (age 35)
Martina Stefani (ITA)	6 November 1998 (age 28)
Karlijn Swinkels (NED)	28 October 1998 (age 28)
Carlee Taylor (AUS)	15 February 1989 (age 37)
Anna Trevisi (ITA)	8 May 1992 (age 34)
Daiva Tušlaitė (LTU)	18 June 1986 (age 40)
Anisha Vekemans (BEL)	17 August 1991 (age 35)

=== Aromitalia Vaiano ===
Rider	Date of birth
Michela Balducci (ITA)	30 July 1995 (age 31)
Angelica Brogi (ITA)	20 October 1998 (age 28)
Alessia Bulleri (ITA)	19 July 1993 (age 33)
Claudia Cadeddu (ITA)	9 August 1999 (age 27)
Heidi Dalton (RSA)	21 March 1995 (age 31)

Rider	Date of birth
Lisa De Ranieri (ITA)	30 July 1997 (age 29)
Rasa Leleivytė (LTU)	22 July 1988 (age 38)
Giulia Marchesini (ITA)	14 May 1998 (age 28)
Emilia Matteoli (ITA)	12 November 1999 (age 26)
Nicole Nesti (ITA)	20 September 1997 (age 29)

=== Astana Womens Team ===
Rider	Date of birth
Martina Alzini (ITA)	10 February 1997 (age 29)
Sofia Beggin (ITA)	12 October 1997 (age 29)
Sofia Bertizzolo (ITA)	21 August 1997 (age 29)
Amiliya Iskakova (KAZ)	29 March 1995 (age 31)
Blanca Liliana Moreno (COL)	8 July 1992 (age 34)
Letizia Paternoster (ITA)	22 July 1999 (age 27)
Elena Pirrone (ITA)	21 February 1999 (age 27)

Rider	Date of birth
Jeidi Pradera (CUB)	7 February 1998 (age 28)
Carolina Rodríguez (MEX)	10 February 1997 (age 29)
Natalya Saifutdinova (KAZ)	11 February 1989 (age 37)
Arlenis Sierra (CUB)	7 December 1992 (age 33)
Makhabbat Umutzhanova (KAZ)	11 August 1994 (age 32)
Lara Vieceli (ITA)	16 July 1993 (age 33)

=== Bepink ===
Rider	Date of birth
Letizia Borghesi (ITA)	16 October 1998 (age 28)
Eyerusalem Kelil (ETH)	21 January 1992 (age 34)
Erica Magnaldi (ITA)	24 August 1992 (age 34)
Tereza Medveďová (SVK)	27 March 1996 (age 30)
Lisa Morzenti (ITA)	23 January 1998 (age 28)

Rider	Date of birth
Nikola Nosková (CZE)	1 July 1991 (age 35)
Francesca Pattaro (ITA)	12 March 1995 (age 31)
Katia Ragusa (ITA)	19 May 1997 (age 29)
Maria Vittoria Sperotto (ITA)	20 November 1996 (age 29)
Silvia Valsecchi (ITA)	19 July 1982 (age 44)

=== Bizkaia Durango–Euskadi Murias ===
Rider	Date of birth
Sandra Alonso (ESP)	19 August 1998 (age 28)
Alice Maria Arzuffi (ITA)	19 November 1994 (age 31)
Danielle Christmas (GBR)	21 December 1987 (age 38)
Henrietta Colborne (GBR)	20 April 1998 (age 28)
Miriam Gardachal Bozal (ESP)	22 July 1999 (age 27)
Lucia Gonzalez (ESP)	9 July 1990 (age 36)
Aroa Gorostiza Nicole Ulloa (ESP)	22 July 1999 (age 27)

Rider	Date of birth
Irati Idirin (ESP)	13 May 1994 (age 32)
Ane Iriarte (ESP)	4 April 1995 (age 31)
Lierni Lekuona (ESP)	8 April 1995 (age 31)
Cristina Martinez (ESP)	2 January 1996 (age 30)
Yessica Pérez Torrente (ESP)	20 July 1992 (age 34)
Anna Zita Maria Stricker (ITA)	3 July 1994 (age 32)
Zaloa Trevilla Martin (ESP)	29 August 1992 (age 34)

=== Boels–Dolmans ===
Rider	Date of birth
Chantal Blaak (NED)	22 October 1989 (age 37)
Karol-Ann Canuel (CAN)	18 April 1988 (age 38)
Lizzie Deignan (GBR)	18 December 1988 (age 37)
Amalie Dideriksen (DEN)	24 May 1996 (age 30)
Megan Guarnier (USA)	4 May 1985 (age 41)
Christine Majerus (LUX)	25 February 1987 (age 39)

Rider	Date of birth
Amy Pieters (NED)	1 June 1991 (age 35)
Anna Plichta (POL)	10 February 1992 (age 34)
Skylar Schneider (USA)	3 September 1998 (age 28)
Jip van den Bos (NED)	12 April 1996 (age 30)
Anna van der Breggen (NED)	18 April 1990 (age 36)

=== BTC City Ljubljana ===
Rider	Date of birth
Polona Batagelj (SLO)	7 June 1989 (age 37)
Maaike Boogaard (NED)	24 August 1998 (age 28)
Urška Bravec (SLO)	14 December 1996 (age 29)
Eugenia Bujak (POL)	25 June 1989 (age 37)
Tanja Elsner (SLO)	16 January 1993 (age 33)
Anastasia Iakovenko (RUS)	7 April 1995 (age 31)
Corinna Lechner (GER)	10 August 1994 (age 32)

Rider	Date of birth
Hanna Nilsson (SWE)	16 February 1992 (age 34)
Olena Pavlukhina (AZE)	1 March 1989 (age 37)
Karin Penko (SLO)	3 August 1999 (age 27)
Urša Pintar (SLO)	3 October 1985 (age 41)
Mia Radotić (CRO)	2 December 1984 (age 41)
Saša Žavbi (SLO)	20 March 1998 (age 28)
Urška Žigart (SLO)	4 December 1996 (age 29)

=== Canyon–SRAM ===
Rider	Date of birth
Alena Amialiusik (BLR)	6 February 1989 (age 37)
Alice Barnes (GBR)	17 July 1995 (age 31)
Hannah Barnes (GBR)	4 May 1993 (age 33)
Elena Cecchini (ITA)	25 May 1992 (age 34)
Tiffany Cromwell (AUS)	6 July 1988 (age 38)
Tanja Erath (GER)	7 October 1989 (age 37)
Pauline Ferrand-Prévot (FRA)	10 February 1992 (age 34)

Rider	Date of birth
Lisa Klein (GER)	15 July 1996 (age 30)
Katarzyna Niewiadoma (POL)	29 September 1994 (age 32)
Christa Riffel (GER)	30 July 1998 (age 28)
Alexis Ryan (USA)	18 August 1994 (age 32)
Leah Thorvilson (USA)	9 January 1979 (age 47)
Trixi Worrack (GER)	28 September 1981 (age 45)

=== Cervélo–Bigla Pro Cycling ===
Rider	Date of birth
Emma Cecilie Norsgaard (DEN)	26 July 1999 (age 27)
Ann-Sophie Duyck (BEL)	23 July 1987 (age 39)
Nicole Hanselmann (SUI)	6 May 1991 (age 35)
Clara Koppenburg (GER)	3 August 1995 (age 31)
Lotta Lepistö (FIN)	28 June 1989 (age 37)

Rider	Date of birth
Cecilie Uttrup Ludwig (DNK)	23 August 1995 (age 31)
Ashleigh Moolman (RSA)	9 December 1985 (age 40)
Claire Rose (GBR)	23 May 1987 (age 39)
Marie Vilmann (DNK)	21 October 1993 (age 33)

=== China Liv Pro Cycling ===
Rider	Date of birth
Bai Yue (CHN)	13 December 1992 (age 33)
Qialon Chen (CHN)	2 September 1996 (age 30)
Jiaqi Li (CHN)	27 July 1995 (age 31)
Liang Hongyu (CHN)	23 October 1990 (age 36)
Dexiang Liu (CHN)	23 January 1993 (age 33)
Liu Jiali (CHN)	6 April 1994 (age 32)
Mei Lu (CHN)	16 April 1997 (age 29)

Rider	Date of birth
Siying Lu (CHN)	4 November 1996 (age 30)
Meng Zhaojuan (HKG)	14 December 1989 (age 36)
Pu Yixian (CHN)	23 December 1992 (age 33)
Sun Xue (CHN)	23 November 1990 (age 35)
Peixiao Wu (CHN)	27 August 1996 (age 30)
Zhao Xisha (CHN)	28 September 1992 (age 34)

=== Cogeas–Mettler Pro Cycling Team ===
Rider	Date of birth
Ekaterina Anoshina (RUS)	26 April 1991 (age 35)
Evgenya Augustinas (RUS)	22 January 1988 (age 38)
Gulnaz Badykova (RUS)	21 April 1994 (age 32)
Elise Chabbey (SUI)	24 April 1993 (age 33)
Antri Christoforou (CYP)	4 February 1992 (age 34)

Rider	Date of birth
Karina Kasenova (RUS)	5 June 1998 (age 28)
Maria Novolodskaya (RUS)	28 July 1999 (age 27)
Yelyzaveta Oshurkova (RUS)	19 June 1991 (age 35)
Ksenia Tuhai (BLR)	1 July 1995 (age 31)
Olga Zabelinskaya (RUS)	10 May 1980 (age 46)

=== Conceria Zabri–Fanini ===
Rider	Date of birth
Lisa Allkokondi (ALB)	17 May 1995 (age 31)
Carmela Cipriani (ITA)	11 November 1996 (age 29)
Manuela De Iuliis (ITA)	23 March 1991 (age 35)
Clemilda Fernandes (BRA)	25 June 1979 (age 47)
Keti Fetishi (ALB)	15 April 1997 (age 29)
Elena Franchi (ITA)	26 August 1996 (age 30)
Joli Karafili (ALB)	6 October 1995 (age 31)
Xhorxhia Kristollari (ALB)	2 May 1995 (age 31)

Rider	Date of birth
Daniela Magnetto Allietta (ITA)	23 February 1996 (age 30)
Xheina Metalja (ALB)	6 February 1997 (age 29)
Claudia Meucci (ITA)	22 January 1999 (age 27)
Loreta Pirro (ALB)	15 November 1997 (age 28)
Jona Rizvanolli (ALB)	2 May 1992 (age 34)
Elona Rusta (ALB)	3 September 1996 (age 30)
Basei Marzia Salton (ITA)	7 July 1997 (age 29)
Isabella Strizzi (ITA)	31 August 1997 (age 29)

=== Cylance Pro Cycling ===
Rider	Date of birth
Holly Breck (USA)	27 May 1992 (age 34)
Giorgia Bronzini (ITA)	3 August 1983 (age 43)
Kristabel Doebel-Hickok (USA)	28 April 1989 (age 37)
Jelena Erić (SER)	15 January 1996 (age 30)
Sheyla Gutiérrez (ESP)	1 January 1994 (age 32)
Kaitie Keogh (USA)	1 January 1992 (age 34)

Rider	Date of birth
Rossella Ratto (ITA)	20 October 1993 (age 33)
Omer Shapira (ISR)	9 September 1994 (age 32)
Lauren Stephens (USA)	28 December 1986 (age 39)
Marta Tagliaferro (ITA)	4 November 1989 (age 37)
Marcella Toldi (BRA)	3 May 1984 (age 42)

=== Doltcini–Van Eyck Sport UCI Women Cycling ===
Rider	Date of birth
Kim de Baat (BEL)	29 May 1991 (age 35)
Sofie De Vuyst (BEL)	2 April 1987 (age 39)
Mieke Docx (BEL)	8 June 1996 (age 30)
Demmy Druyts (BEL)	4 October 1995 (age 31)
Kelly Druyts (BEL)	21 October 1989 (age 37)
Sarah Inghelbrecht (BEL)	1 October 1992 (age 34)
Pascale Jeuland-Tranchant (FRA)	2 June 1987 (age 39)
Ditte Lenseclaes (BEL)	22 June 1999 (age 27)

Rider	Date of birth
Kelly Markus (NED)	7 February 1993 (age 33)
Daniela Reis (POR)	6 April 1993 (age 33)
Tetyana Ryabchenko (UKR)	28 August 1989 (age 37)
Marion Sicot (FRA)	24 June 1992 (age 34)
Lotte van Hoek (NED)	8 August 1991 (age 35)
Bryony van Velzen (NED)	14 May 1996 (age 30)
Saartje Vandenbroucke (BEL)	13 February 1996 (age 30)

=== Eurotarget–Bianchi–Vitasana ===
Rider	Date of birth
Ana Covrig (ROM)	8 December 1994 (age 31)
Nicole D'Agostin (ITA)	1 February 1999 (age 27)
Arianna Fidanza (ITA)	6 January 1995 (age 31)
Martina Fidanza (ITA)	5 November 1999 (age 27)
Alice Gasparini (ITA)	14 December 1997 (age 28)

Rider	Date of birth
Gloria Manzoni (ITA)	25 April 1998 (age 28)
Anna Pedroni (ITA)	26 February 1999 (age 27)
Debora Silvestri (ITA)	8 May 1998 (age 28)
Manuela Sonzogni (ITA)	30 June 1985 (age 41)
Suzanne Verhoeven (BEL)	8 May 1996 (age 30)

=== Experza–Footlogix Ladies Cycling Team ===
Rider	Date of birth
Manon Bakker (NED)	15 July 1999 (age 27)
Nathalie Bex (BEL)	12 April 1998 (age 28)
Thalita de Jong (NED)	6 November 1993 (age 33)
Jessy Druyts (BEL)	22 January 1994 (age 32)
Lenny Druyts (BEL)	18 May 1997 (age 29)
Axellle Dubau-Prevot (FRA)	31 July 1996 (age 30)
Séverine Eraud (FRA)	24 May 1992 (age 34)

Rider	Date of birth
Trine Holmsgaard (DEN)	4 September 1997 (age 29)
Sara Mustonen (SWE)	8 February 1981 (age 45)
Sarah Rijkes (AUT)	2 April 1991 (age 35)
Lotte Rotman (BEL)	19 June 1999 (age 27)
Agnieszka Skalniak (POL)	22 April 1997 (age 29)
Susanna Zorzi (ITA)	13 March 1992 (age 34)

=== FDJ Nouvelle-Aquitaine Futuroscope ===
Rider	Date of birth
Charlotte Bravard (FRA)	12 January 1992 (age 34)
Coralie Demay (FRA)	10 October 1992 (age 34)
Eugénie Duval (FRA)	3 May 1993 (age 33)
Roxane Fournier (FRA)	7 November 1991 (age 34)
Shara Gillow (AUS)	23 December 1987 (age 38)
Maëlle Grossetête (FRA)	10 April 1998 (age 28)

Rider	Date of birth
Victorie Guilman (FRA)	25 March 1996 (age 30)
Lauren Kitchen (AUS)	21 November 1990 (age 35)
Evita Muzic (FRA)	11 October 1996 (age 30)
Greta Richioud (FRA)	11 October 1996 (age 30)
Rozanne Slik (NED)	12 April 1991 (age 35)
Moniek Tenniglo (NED)	2 May 1988 (age 38)

=== Hagens Berman–Supermint ===
Rider	Date of birth
Whitney Allison (USA)	1 March 1988 (age 38)
Jessica Cerra (USA)	1 May 1982 (age 44)
Tarah Cole (USA)	15 November 1989 (age 36)
Lindsay Goldman (USA)	31 October 1984 (age 42)
Mandy Heintz (USA)	27 July 1981 (age 45)
Julie Kuliecza (USA)	4 November 1980 (age 46)

Rider	Date of birth
Jennifer Luebke (USA)	1 April 1986 (age 40)
Peta Mullens (AUS)	8 March 1988 (age 38)
Harriet Owen (GBR)	16 December 1993 (age 32)
Liza Rachetto (USA)	30 January 1974 (age 52)
Starla Teddergreen (USA)	11 December 1979 (age 46)
Lizzie Williams (AUS)	15 August 1983 (age 43)

=== Health Mate–Cyclelive Team ===
Rider	Date of birth
Delphine Brits (BEL)	2 November 1982 (age 44)
Megan Chard (GBR)	6 January 1998 (age 28)
Fien De Paepe (BEL)	17 May 1996 (age 30)
Lara Defour (BEL)	12 November 1997 (age 28)
Tara Gins (BEL)	2 December 1990 (age 35)
Špela Kern (SLO)	24 February 1990 (age 36)
Desiree Liegeois (NED)	27 September 1997 (age 29)
Elena Novikova (UKR)	14 January 1984 (age 42)
Flávia Oliveira (BRA)	27 October 1981 (age 45)

Rider	Date of birth
Christina Perchtold (AUT)	11 May 1993 (age 33)
Kathrin Schweinberger (AUT)	29 October 1996 (age 30)
Christina Schweinberger (AUT)	29 October 1996 (age 30)
Chloë Turblin (FRA)	19 September 1995 (age 31)
Laura Vainionpää (FIN)	11 April 1994 (age 32)
Janine van der Meer (NED)	17 February 1994 (age 32)
Marieke van Witzenburg (NED)	29 October 1985 (age 41)
Lore Verstraete (BEL)	15 August 1998 (age 28)

=== Hitec Products–Birk Sport ===
Rider	Date of birth
Susanne Andersen (NOR)	23 July 1998 (age 28)
Charlotte Becker (GER)	19 May 1983 (age 43)
Simona Frapporti (ITA)	14 July 1988 (age 38)
Ingvild Gåskjenn (NOR)	1 July 1998 (age 28)
Tatiana Guderzo (ITA)	22 August 1984 (age 42)
Line Marie Gulliksen (NOR)	4 July 1990 (age 36)
Vita Heine (NOR)	21 November 1984 (age 41)

Rider	Date of birth
Nina Kessler (NED)	4 July 1988 (age 38)
Ingrid Lorvik (NOR)	21 February 1986 (age 40)
Ingrid Moe (NOR)	15 November 1984 (age 41)
Camilla Mollerbro (DEN)	21 May 1984 (age 42)
Julie Meyer Solvang (NOR)	3 September 1989 (age 37)
Thea Thorsen (NOR)	15 March 1992 (age 34)

=== Lotto–Soudal Ladies ===
Rider	Date of birth
Isabelle Beckers (BEL)	4 March 1983 (age 43)
Alana Castrique (BEL)	8 May 1999 (age 27)
Demi de Jong (NED)	11 February 1995 (age 31)
Élise Delzenne (FRA)	28 January 1989 (age 37)
Valerie Demey (BEL)	17 January 1994 (age 32)
Annelies Dom (BEL)	8 April 1986 (age 40)
Annabelle Dreville (FRA)	4 March 1995 (age 31)

Rider	Date of birth
Chantal Hoffmann (LUX)	30 October 1987 (age 39)
Lotte Kopecky (BEL)	10 November 1995 (age 30)
Puck Moonen (NED)	20 March 1996 (age 30)
Marjolein van 't Geloof (NED)	27 March 1996 (age 30)
Julie Van De Velde (BEL)	2 June 1993 (age 33)
Kelly Van den Steen (BEL)	1 September 1995 (age 31)
Fenna Vanhoutte (BEL)	6 July 1997 (age 29)

=== Minsk Cycling Club ===
Rider	Date of birth
Krystsina Bialetskaya (BLR)	6 August 1998 (age 28)
Anastasiya Dzedzikava (BLR)	2 January 1997 (age 29)
nastassia Kiptsikava (BLR)	10 August 1999 (age 27)
Maryna Kuchynskaya (BLR)	20 January 1996 (age 30)
Taisa Naskovich (BLR)	19 September 1995 (age 31)

Rider	Date of birth
Anastasia Safonava (BLR)	26 December 1997 (age 28)
Karalina Savenka (BLR)	21 April 1998 (age 28)
Ina Savenka (BLR)	5 August 1994 (age 32)
Tatsiana Sharakova (BLR)	31 July 1984 (age 42)
Hanna Tserah (BLR)	7 September 1998 (age 28)

=== Mitchelton–Scott ===
Rider	Date of birth
Jessica Allen (AUS)	17 April 1993 (age 33)
Jenelle Crooks (AUS)	2 July 1994 (age 32)
Jolien D'Hoore (BEL)	14 March 1990 (age 36)
Gracie Elvin (AUS)	31 October 1988 (age 38)
Lucy Kennedy (AUS)	11 July 1988 (age 38)

Rider	Date of birth
Alexandra Manly (AUS)	28 February 1996 (age 30)
Sarah Roy (AUS)	27 February 1986 (age 40)
Amanda Spratt (AUS)	17 September 1987 (age 39)
Annemiek van Vleuten (NED)	8 October 1982 (age 44)
Georgia Williams (NZL)	25 August 1993 (age 33)

=== Parkhotel Valkenburg Cycling Team ===
Rider	Date of birth
Nina Buysman (NED)	16 November 1997 (age 28)
Sophie de Boer (NED)	12 December 1990 (age 35)
Belle de Gast (NED)	4 February 1991 (age 35)
Anne de Ruiter (NED)	30 November 1999 (age 26)
Ilona Hoeksma (NED)	22 May 1991 (age 35)
Marit Raaijmakers (NED)	2 June 1999 (age 27)
Amy Roberts (GBR)	24 December 1994 (age 31)

Rider	Date of birth
Hanna Solovey (UKR)	31 January 1992 (age 34)
Chanella Stougje (NED)	23 October 1996 (age 30)
Meike Uiterwijk Winkel (NED)	4 December 1999 (age 26)
Nancy van der Burg (NED)	18 May 1992 (age 34)
Natalie van Gogh (NED)	14 September 1974 (age 52)
Esther van Veen (NED)	27 September 1990 (age 36)
Lorena Wiebes (NED)	17 March 1999 (age 27)

=== Rally Cycling ===
Rider	Date of birth
Erica Allar (USA)	5 November 1985 (age 41)
Sara Bergen (CAN)	6 December 1988 (age 37)
Allison Beveridge (CAN)	1 June 1993 (age 33)
Kelly Catlin (USA)	3 November 1995 (age 31)
Gillian Ellsay (CAN)	26 March 1997 (age 29)
Heidi Franz (USA)	Unknown
Megan Heath (USA)	27 March 1999 (age 27)

Rider	Date of birth
Kirsti Lay (CAN)	7 April 1988 (age 38)
Katherine Maine (CAN)	22 November 1997 (age 28)
Abigail Mickey (USA)	3 July 1990 (age 36)
Summer Moak (USA)	3 June 1999 (age 27)
Sara Poidevin (CAN)	7 May 1996 (age 30)
Emma White (USA)	23 August 1997 (age 29)

=== S.C. Michela Fanini Rox ===
Rider	Date of birth
Francesca Balducci (ITA)	1 May 1996 (age 30)
Sara Barbieri (ITA)	28 June 1991 (age 35)
Anna Ceoloni (ITA)	8 October 1991 (age 35)
Lilibeth Chacón (VEN)	1 March 1992 (age 34)
Alessia Dal Magro (ITA)	21 August 1998 (age 28)
Elisa Dalla Valle (ITA)	16 January 1998 (age 28)

Rider	Date of birth
Leonora Geppi (ITA)	9 December 1999 (age 26)
Mónika Király (HUN)	10 November 1983 (age 42)
Greta Marturano (ITA)	14 June 1998 (age 28)
Olga Shekel (UKR)	28 May 1994 (age 32)
Yevgenia Vysotska (UKR)	11 December 1975 (age 50)

=== Servetto–Stradalli Cycle–Alurecycling ===
Rider	Date of birth
Sara Casasola (ITA)	29 November 1999 (age 26)
Mossana Debesay (ERI)	25 November 1993 (age 32)
Marika Depetris (ITA)	2 March 1999 (age 27)
Kseniya Dobrynina (RUS)	11 January 1994 (age 32)
Katja Jeretina (SLO)	23 May 1997 (age 29)
Francesca Marengo (ITA)	25 August 1999 (age 27)
Argiro Milaki (GRE)	3 July 1992 (age 34)

Rider	Date of birth
Barbara Milone (ITA)	22 October 1983 (age 43)
Rosalia Ortiz (ESP)	20 March 1999 (age 27)
Jessica Parra (COL)	10 August 1995 (age 31)
Anna Potokina (RUS)	18 June 1987 (age 39)
Ana Sanabria (COL)	2 May 1990 (age 36)
Paula Sanmartín (ESP)	16 March 1997 (age 29)
Femke Verstichelen (BEL)	22 March 1984 (age 42)

=== Team Virtu Cycling Women ===
Rider	Date of birth
Katrine Aalerud (NOR)	4 December 1994 (age 31)
Barbara Guarischi (ITA)	2 October 1990 (age 36)
Claudia Koster (NED)	22 March 1992 (age 34)
Mieke Kröger (GER)	18 July 1993 (age 33)
Emilie Moberg (NOR)	12 July 1991 (age 35)
Louise Hansen (DNK)	12 February 1995 (age 31)

Rider	Date of birth
Katarzyna Pawłowska (POL)	16 August 1989 (age 37)
Sara Penton (SWE)	15 November 1988 (age 37)
Trine Schmidt (DEN)	3 July 1988 (age 38)
Doris Schweizer (SUI)	28 August 1989 (age 37)
Christina Siggaard (DNK)	24 March 1994 (age 32)
Linda Villumsen (NZL)	9 April 1985 (age 41)

=== Team Sunweb ===
Rider	Date of birth
Lucinda Brand (NED)	2 July 1989 (age 37)
Leah Kirchmann (CAN)	30 June 1990 (age 36)
Juliette Labous (FRA)	4 November 1998 (age 28)
Liane Lippert (GER)	13 January 1998 (age 28)
Floortje Mackaij (NED)	18 October 1995 (age 31)

Rider	Date of birth
Pernille Mathiesen (DEN)	5 October 1997 (age 29)
Coryn Rivera (USA)	26 August 1992 (age 34)
Julia Soek (NED)	12 December 1990 (age 35)
Ellen van Dijk (NED)	11 February 1987 (age 39)
Ruth Winder (USA)	9 July 1993 (age 33)

=== Tibco–Silicon Valley Bank ===
Rider	Date of birth
Lex Albrecht (CAN)	6 April 1987 (age 39)
Nicolle Bruderer (GUA)	15 August 1993 (age 33)
Kathryn Buss (USA)	4 October 1993 (age 33)
Brodie Chapman (AUS)	9 April 1991 (age 35)
Alice Cobb (GBR)	31 July 1995 (age 31)
Íngrid Drexel (MEX)	28 July 1993 (age 33)
Emma Grant (GBR)	30 September 1991 (age 35)

Rider	Date of birth
Alison Jackson (CAN)	14 December 1988 (age 37)
Shannon Malseed (AUS)	27 December 1994 (age 31)
Emily Newsom (USA)	4 September 1983 (age 43)
Kendall Ryan (USA)	10 August 1992 (age 34)
Jennifer Tetrick (USA)	15 November 1981 (age 44)
Lizzie Williams (USA)	15 August 1983 (age 43)

=== Thailand Women's Cycling Team ===
Rider	Date of birth
Thiangkaew Apinya (THA)	9 March 1995 (age 31)
Chaniporn Batriya (THA)	12 August 1999 (age 27)
Sarocha Kamonkhon (THA)	15 August 1997 (age 29)
Wilaiwan Kunlapha (THA)	25 December 1987 (age 38)
Wathinee Luekajorh (THA)	21 July 1987 (age 39)
Jutatip Maneephan (THA)	8 July 1998 (age 28)

Rider	Date of birth
Chanpeng Nontasin (THA)	9 October 1984 (age 42)
Supaksorn Nuntana (THA)	8 December 1989 (age 36)
Pannaray Rasee (THA)	21 August 1996 (age 30)
Suthima Sopa (THA)	10 September 1996 (age 30)
Piyathida Thitjan (THA)	15 December 1998 (age 27)

=== Top Girls Fassa Bortolo ===
Rider	Date of birth
Vania Canvelli (ITA)	21 October 1997 (age 29)
Francesca Cauz (ITA)	24 September 1992 (age 34)
Elena Leonardi (ITA)	7 December 1995 (age 30)
Sara Mariotto (ITA)	7 June 1997 (age 29)
Chiara Perini (ITA)	9 December 1997 (age 28)

Rider	Date of birth
Maja Perinović (CRO)	24 September 1999 (age 27)
Francesca Pisciali (ITA)	19 May 1998 (age 28)
Nadia Quagliotto (ITA)	22 March 1997 (age 29)
Beatrice Rossato (ITA)	6 November 1996 (age 30)
Laura Tomasi (ITA)	1 July 1999 (age 27)

=== TWENTY20 p/b Sho-Air ===
Rider	Date of birth
Sofía Arreola (MEX)	22 April 1991 (age 35)
Erica Clevenger (USA)	1 May 1994 (age 32)
Margo Clyne (USA)	27 February 1995 (age 31)
Allie Dragoo (USA)	17 December 1989 (age 36)
Jasmin Duehring (CAN)	8 July 1992 (age 34)
Chloé Dygert (USA)	1 January 1997 (age 29)

Rider	Date of birth
Scotti Lechuga (USA)	7 January 1983 (age 43)
Marlies Mejías (CUB)	29 December 1992 (age 33)
Danielle Morshead (USA)	26 September 1996 (age 30)
Shayna Powless (USA)	8 January 1994 (age 32)
Stephanie Roorda (CAN)	3 December 1986 (age 39)
Jennifer Valente (USA)	24 December 1994 (age 31)

=== UnitedHealthcare Pro Cycling ===
Rider	Date of birth
Elizabeth Banks (UK)	7 November 1990 (age 35)
Rushlee Buchanan (NZL)	20 January 1988 (age 38)
Janelle Cole (USA)	19 October 1996 (age 30)
Katie Hall (USA)	6 January 1987 (age 39)

Rider	Date of birth
Lauren Hall (USA)	2 February 1979 (age 47)
Lauretta Hanson (AUS)	29 October 1994 (age 32)
Diana Peñuela (COL)	8 September 1986 (age 40)
Leah Thomas (USA)	30 May 1989 (age 37)

=== Valcar–PBM ===
Rider	Date of birth
Allegra Arzuffi (ITA)	17 April 1993 (age 33)
Elisa Balsamo (ITA)	27 February 1998 (age 28)
Marta Cavalli (ITA)	18 March 1998 (age 28)
Maria Giulia Confalonieri (ITA)	30 March 1993 (age 33)
Chiara Consonni (ITA)	24 June 1999 (age 27)
Dalia Muccioli (ITA)	28 February 1996 (age 30)
Asja Paladin (ITA)	27 September 1994 (age 32)

Rider	Date of birth
Silvia Persico (ITA)	9 March 1982 (age 44)
Silvia Pollicini (ITA)	14 October 1988 (age 38)
Ilaria Sanguineti (ITA)	15 April 1994 (age 32)
Miriam Vece (ITA)	27 February 1986 (age 40)
Alessia Vigilia (ITA)	1 September 1999 (age 27)
Chiara Zanettin (ITA)	17 September 1987 (age 39)

=== Wiggle High5 Pro Cycling ===
Rider	Date of birth
Katie Archibald (GBR)	12 March 1994 (age 32)
Rachele Barbieri (ITA)	21 February 1997 (age 29)
Elinor Barker (GBR)	7 September 1994 (age 32)
Lisa Brennauer (GER)	8 June 1988 (age 38)
Grace Brown (AUS)	7 July 1992 (age 34)
Audrey Cordon (FRA)	22 September 1989 (age 37)
Amy Cure (AUS)	31 December 1992 (age 33)
Annette Edmondson (AUS)	12 December 1991 (age 34)
Emilia Fahlin (SWE)	24 October 1988 (age 38)

Rider	Date of birth
Lucy Garner (GBR)	20 September 1994 (age 32)
Grace Garner (GBR)	19 June 1997 (age 29)
Julie Leth (DNK)	13 July 1992 (age 34)
Elisa Longo Borghini (ITA)	10 December 1991 (age 34)
Martina Ritter (AUT)	23 September 1982 (age 44)
Macey Stewart (AUS)	16 January 1996 (age 30)
Kirsten Wild (NED)	15 October 1982 (age 44)
Eri Yonamine (JPN)	25 April 1991 (age 35)

=== WaowDeals Pro Cycling ===
Rider	Date of birth
Rotem Gafinovitz (ISR)	9 June 1992 (age 34)
Yara Kastelijn (NED)	9 August 1997 (age 29)
Jeanne Korevaar (NED)	24 September 1996 (age 30)
Anouska Koster (NED)	20 August 1993 (age 33)
Riejanne Markus (NED)	1 September 1994 (age 32)
Katarzyna Niewiadoma (POL)	29 September 1994 (age 32)

Rider	Date of birth
Pauliena Rooijakkers (NED)	12 May 1993 (age 33)
Danielle Rowe (GBR)	21 November 1990 (age 35)
Sabrina Stultiens (NED)	8 July 1993 (age 33)
Monique van de Ree (NED)	2 March 1988 (age 38)
Inge van der Heijden (NED)	12 August 1999 (age 27)
Marianne Vos (NED)	13 May 1987 (age 39)

Preceded by 2017	List of UCI Women's Teams; 2018	Succeeded by 2019
