= 2018 UCI Road World Championships – Women's road race =

Cycling race

Women's road race
2018 UCI Road World Championships
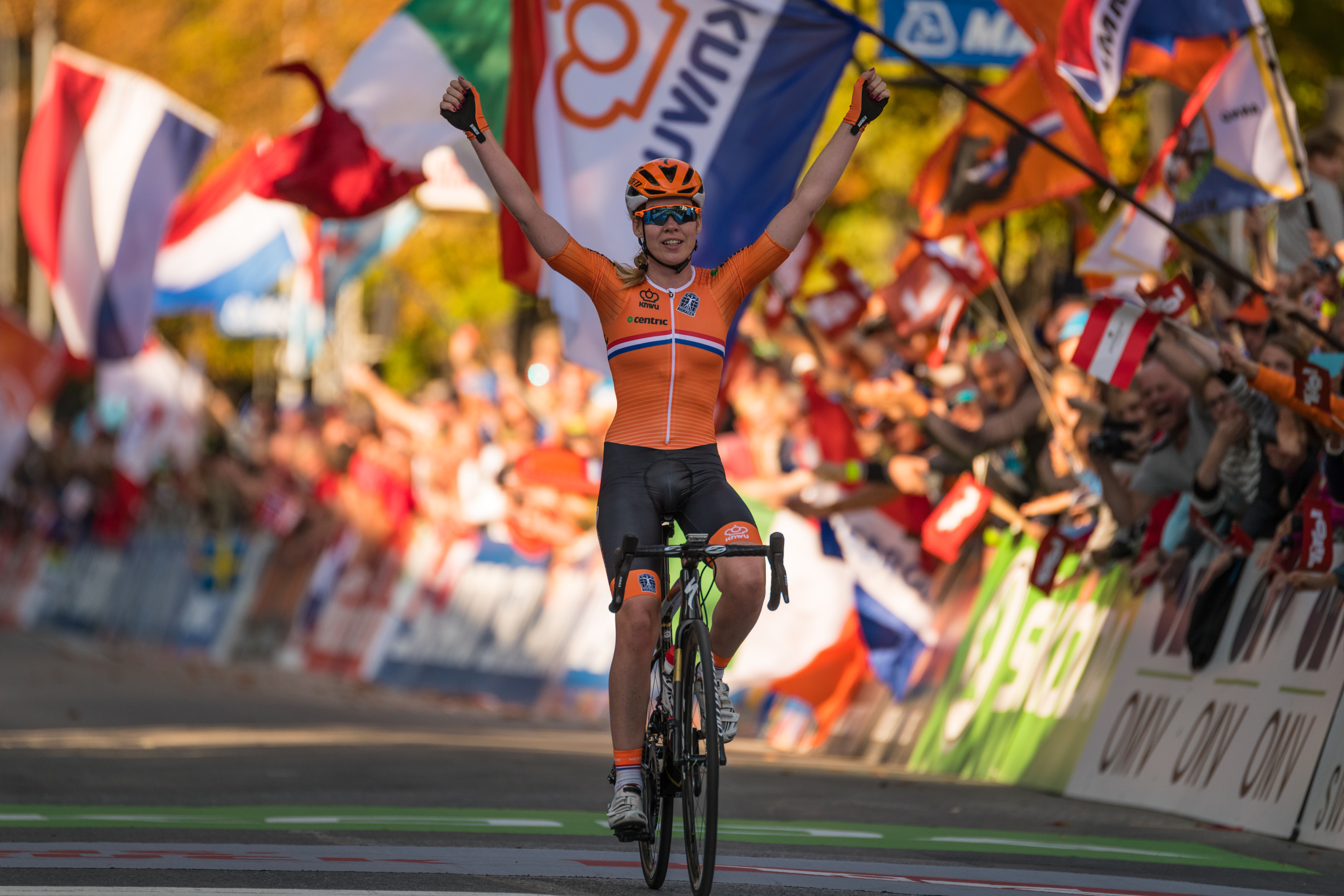

Race details
- Dates: 29 September 2018
- Stages: 1 in Innsbruck, Austria
- Distance: 155.6 km (96.7 mi)
- Winning time: 4h 11' 04"

Medalists
	Gold	(Netherlands) Anna van der Breggen (NED)
	Silver	(Australia) Amanda Spratt (AUS)
	Bronze	(Italy) Tatiana Guderzo (ITA)

The Women's road race of the 2018 UCI Road World Championships was a cycling event that took place on 29 September 2018 in Innsbruck, Austria. It was the 58th edition of the event, for which Dutch rider Chantal Blaak was the defending champion, having won in 2017. 149 riders from 48 nations entered the competition.

Blaak surrendered the title to her teammate Anna van der Breggen, the reigning Olympic champion, after attacking on the penultimate ascent of the Aldrans–Lans–Igls climb. Having caught the erstwhile leaders a few kilometres later, van der Breggen soloed away from them not long after. Van der Breggen extended her advantage over the remaining 40 kilometres (25 miles) and continued on to her first world championship title with a winning margin of three minutes and forty-two seconds. Australia's Amanda Spratt managed to remain clear from the breakaway to take Australia's second consecutive silver medal, while Italy's Tatiana Guderzo – the 2009 world champion – completed the podium, attacking on the final lap from a small group; she finished almost five-and-a-half minutes in arrears of van der Breggen.

== Course ==
The race started in Kufstein and headed south-west towards Innsbruck with a primarily rolling route, except for a climb of 5 kilometres (3.1 miles) between Fritzens and Gnadenwald – as had been in the time trial events earlier in the week – with an average 7.1% gradient and maximum of 14% in places. After 84.2 kilometres (52.3 miles), the riders crossed the finish line for the first time, before starting three laps of a circuit 23.8 kilometres (14.8 miles) in length. The circuit contained a climb of 7.9 kilometres (4.9 miles), at an average gradient of 5.9% but reaching 10% in places, from the outskirts of Innsbruck through Aldrans and Lans towards Igls. After a short period of flat roads, the race descended through Igls back towards Innsbruck and the finish line in front of the Tyrolean State Theatre. At 155.6 kilometres (96.7 miles), the 2018 women's road race was the longest in the championships' history, surpassing the previous record of 152.8 kilometres (94.9 miles) in 2017.

== Qualification ==
Qualification was based mainly on the UCI World Ranking by nations as of 12 August 2018. The first five nations in this classification qualified seven riders to start, the next ten nations qualified six riders to start and the next five nations qualified five riders to start. All other nations had the possibility to send three riders to start. In addition to this number, the outgoing World Champion and the current continental champions (for both elite and under-23 riders) were also able to take part.

=== Continental champions ===
Champion	Name	Note
Outgoing World Champion	Chantal Blaak (NED)	Competed
Asian Champion	Nguyễn Thị Thật (VIE)	Competed
Pan American Champion	Arlenis Sierra (CUB)	Competed
African Champion	Bisrat Gebremeskel (ERI)	Did not compete
Asian Under-23 Champion	Liu Zixin (CHN)	Did not compete
European Champion	Marta Bastianelli (ITA)	Did not compete
European Under-23 Champion	Nikola Nosková (CZE)	Did not compete
Oceanian Champion	Sharlotte Lucas (NZL)	Did not compete

=== UCI World Ranking by Nations ===
Rankings as at 12 August 2018.

Rank	Nation	Points
1	Netherlands	7123.71
2	Australia	3644.91
3	Italy	3521.43
4	United States	3069.14
5	Germany	2025.60
6	Belgium	1947.98
7	South Africa	1747.12
8	Poland	1577.81
9	France	1539.32
10	Spain	1262.62

Rank	Nation	Points
11	Denmark	1241.74
12	Canada	1122.47
13	Great Britain	1110.21
14	New Zealand	1110
15	Cuba	950
16	Slovenia	910
17	Luxembourg	907.57
18	Russia	891
19	Norway	623.33
20	Sweden	597.60

=== Participating nations ===
149 cyclists from 48 nations were entered in the women's road race. The number of cyclists per nation is shown in parentheses.

- Albania (1)
- Argentina (1)
- Australia (7)
- Austria (3)
- Belgium (6)
- Brazil (2)
- Canada (6)
- Chile (1)
- China (1)
- Colombia (3)
- Croatia (1)
- Cuba (2)
- Cyprus (1)
- Czech Republic (1)
- Denmark (6)
- Eritrea (1)
- Ethiopia (1)
- Finland (2)
- France (6)
- Germany (7)
- Great Britain (6)
- Greece (1)
- Hong Kong (2)
- Hungary (1)
- Ireland (1)
- Israel (2)
- Italy (7)
- Japan (3)
- Kazakhstan (3)
- Lithuania (1)
- Luxembourg (2)
- Netherlands (8)
- New Zealand (3)
- Norway (5)
- Poland (6)
- Romania (1)
- Russia (5)
- Serbia (1)
- Slovakia (2)
- Slovenia (4)
- South Africa (2)
- Spain (6)
- Sweden (3)
- Switzerland (3)
- Trinidad and Tobago (1)
- Ukraine (3)
- United States (7)
- Vietnam (1)

== Final classification ==
Of the race's 149 entrants, 81 riders completed the full distance of 155.6 kilometres (96.7 mi).

Rank	Rider	Country	Time
1	Anna van der Breggen	Netherlands	4h 11' 04"
2	Amanda Spratt	Australia	+ 3' 42"
3	Tatiana Guderzo	Italy	+ 5' 26"
4	Emilia Fahlin	Sweden	+ 6' 13"
5	Małgorzata Jasińska	Poland	+ 6' 13"
6	Karol-Ann Canuel	Canada	+ 6' 17"
7	Annemiek van Vleuten	Netherlands	+ 7' 05"
8	Amy Pieters	Netherlands	+ 7' 05"
9	Lucinda Brand	Netherlands	+ 7' 17"
10	Ruth Winder	United States	+ 7' 17"
11	Rasa Leleivytė	Lithuania	+ 7' 17"
12	Katarzyna Niewiadoma	Poland	+ 7' 17"
13	Elisa Longo Borghini	Italy	+ 7' 17"
14	Sara Poidevin	Canada	+ 7' 17"
15	Anastasiia Iakovenko	Russia	+ 7' 17"
16	Megan Guarnier	United States	+ 7' 17"
17	Ashleigh Moolman	South Africa	+ 7' 17"
18	Clara Koppenburg	Germany	+ 7' 17"
19	Margarita Victoria García	Spain	+ 7' 17"
20	Erica Magnaldi	Italy	+ 7' 17"
21	Katie Hall	United States	+ 7' 17"
22	Jolanda Neff	Switzerland	+ 7' 17"
23	Cecilie Uttrup Ludwig	Denmark	+ 7' 22"
24	Lucy Kennedy	Australia	+ 7' 31"
25	Leah Kirchmann	Canada	+ 8' 18"
26	Dani Rowe	United Kingdom	+ 8' 18"
27	Arlenis Sierra	Cuba	+ 8' 18"
28	Sofie De Vuyst	Belgium	+ 8' 18"
29	Stine Borgli	Norway	+ 8' 18"
30	Polona Batagelj	Slovenia	+ 8' 18"
31	Coryn Rivera	United States	+ 8' 18"
32	Hanna Nilsson	Sweden	+ 8' 18"
33	Urša Pintar	Slovenia	+ 8' 18"
34	Eider Merino Cortazar	Spain	+ 8' 18"
35	Shara Gillow	Australia	+ 8' 18"
36	Sina Frei	Switzerland	+ 8' 18"
37	Annika Langvad	Denmark	+ 8' 18"
38	Edwige Pitel	France	+ 8' 18"
39	Yevheniya Vysotska	Ukraine	+ 8' 18"
40	Julie Van de Velde	Belgium	+ 8' 18"
41	Sophie Wright	United Kingdom	+ 8' 36"
42	Kelly Van den Steen	Belgium	+ 9' 00"
43	Ingrid Lorvik	Norway	+ 9' 00"
44	Chantal Blaak	Netherlands	+ 9' 00"
45	Hannah Barnes	United Kingdom	+ 10' 58"
46	Liane Lippert	Germany	+ 10' 58"
47	Georgia Williams	New Zealand	+ 11' 01"
48	Grace Brown	Australia	+ 11' 01"
49	Omer Shapira	Israel	+ 11' 14"
50	Githa Michiels	Belgium	+ 12' 32"
51	Alison Jackson	Canada	+ 12' 48"
52	Liliana Moreno	Colombia	+ 13' 01"
53	Ane Santesteban	Spain	+ 13' 01"
54	Brodie Chapman	Australia	+ 13' 01"
55	Maria Novolodskaya	Russia	+ 13' 10"
56	Olga Shekel	Ukraine	+ 13' 46"
57	Lorena Llamas	Spain	+ 14' 05"
58	Elena Pirrone	Italy	+ 14' 05"
59	Angelika Tazreiter	Austria	+ 14' 26"
60	Ellen van Dijk	Netherlands	+ 14' 29"
61	Juliette Labous	France	+ 14' 29"
62	Anabel Yapura	Argentina	+ 14' 29"
63	Sofia Bertizzolo	Italy	+ 14' 29"
64	Dani Christmas	United Kingdom	+ 14' 51"
65	Špela Kern	Slovenia	+ 14' 51"
66	Grace Anderson	New Zealand	+ 14' 51"
67	Urška Žigart	Slovenia	+ 14' 55"
68	Anna Plichta	Poland	+ 16' 05"
69	Janneke Ensing	Netherlands	+ 16' 05"
70	Diana Klimova	Russia	+ 18' 04"
71	Amalie Dideriksen	Denmark	+ 18' 04"
72	Soraya Paladin	Italy	+ 18' 04"
73	Audrey Cordon-Ragot	France	+ 18' 04"
74	Sara Bergen	Canada	+ 18' 20"
75	Stephanie Subercaseaux	Chile	+ 18' 44"
76	Paula Patiño	Colombia	+ 18' 44"
77	Natalya Saifutdinova	Kazakhstan	+ 18' 44"
78	Caroline Bohé	Denmark	+ 18' 44"
79	Eri Yonamine	Japan	+ 20' 47"
80	Jeanne Korevaar	Netherlands	+ 22' 33"
81	Sarah Rijkes	Austria	+ 23' 06"

Rank	Rider	Country	Time
	Marta Lach	Poland	DNF
	Alice Sharpe	Ireland	DNF
	Tayler Wiles	United States	DNF
	Lisa Brennauer	Germany	DNF
	Anna Henderson	United Kingdom	DNF
	Annabelle Dreville	France	DNF
	Sara Penton	Sweden	DNF
	Ana Maria Covrig	Romania	DNF
	Mónika Király	Hungary	DNF
	Antri Christoforou	Cyprus	DNF
	Pernille Mathiesen	Denmark	DNF
	Mikayla Harvey	New Zealand	DNF
	Katherine Maine	Canada	DNF
	Pu Yixian	China	DNF
	Amiliya Iskakova	Kazakhstan	DNF
	Trixi Worrack	Germany	DNF
	Elena Cecchini	Italy	DNF
	Charlotte Becker	Germany	DNF
	Eugénie Duval	France	DNF
	Aude Biannic	France	DNF
	Leah Thomas	United States	DNF
	Lotta Lepistö	Finland	DNF
	Jelena Erić	Serbia	DNF
	Eyeru Tesfoam Gebru	Ethiopia	DNF
	Kathrin Hammes	Germany	DNF
	Varvara Fasoi	Greece	DNF
	Anna Potokina	Russia	DNF
	Katarzyna Wilkos	Poland	DNF
	Alicia González Blanco	Spain	DNF
	Nguyễn Thị Thật	Vietnam	DNF
	Aurela Nerlo	Poland	DNF
	Emma Cecilie Norsgaard	Denmark	DNF
	Nicole Hanselmann	Switzerland	DNF
	Hiromi Kaneko	Japan	DNF
	Vita Heine	Norway	DNF
	Susanne Andersen	Norway	DNF
	Tereza Medveďová	Slovakia	DNF
	Claire Faber	Luxembourg	DNF
	Teniel Campbell	Trinidad and Tobago	DNF
	Leung Wing Yee	Hong Kong	DNF
	Ana Sanabria	Colombia	DNF
	Miyoko Karami	Japan	DNF
	Faina Potapova	Kazakhstan	DNF
	Anne-Sophie Harsch	Luxembourg	DNF
	Rotem Gafinovitz	Israel	DNF
	Alice Cobb	United Kingdom	DNF
	Maja Perinović	Croatia	DNF
	Cristina Martínez	Spain	DNF
	Tatiana Jaseková	Slovakia	DNF
	Sarah Roy	Australia	DNF
	Tiffany Cromwell	Australia	DNF
	Alexis Ryan	United States	DNF
	Tetyana Ryabchenko	Ukraine	DNF
	Katrine Aalerud	Norway	DNF
	Martina Ritter	Austria	DNF
	Kseniya Dobrynina	Russia	DNF
	Tereza Korvasová	Czech Republic	DNF
	Viivi Puskala	Finland	DNF
	Kaat Hannes	Belgium	DNF
	Camila Coelho	Brazil	DNF
	Clemilda Fernandes	Brazil	DNF
	Valerie Demey	Belgium	DNF
	Christa Riffel	Germany	DNF
	Elne Owen	South Africa	DNF
	Heidy Bernal	Cuba	DNF
	Mosana Debesay	Eritrea	DNF
	Leung Hoi-wah	Hong Kong	DNF
	Rudina Baku	Albania	DNF
