= 2014 Tour de Feminin – O cenu Českého Švýcarska =

Race details
- Dates: 10–13 July 2014
- Stages: 5

The 2014 Tour de Feminin – O cenu Českého Švýcarska or 2014 Tour de Feminin – Krásná Lípa, was the 27th running of the Tour de Feminin – O cenu Českého Švýcarska rated by the UCI as 2.2. Tour de Feminin – Krásná Lípa is a stage race based in the Czech Republic, which forms part of the 2014 women's road cycling calendar and was held over five stages starting in Krásná Lípa, in the Ústí nad Labem Region and concluding back in Krásná Lípa. The race was run over four stages and one individual time trial.

== Stages ==
=== Stage 1 ===
10 July 2014 – Krásná Lípa to Krásná Lípa, 115.8 km (72.0 mi)

Stage 1 result

	Rider	Team	Time
1	Ingrid Lorvik (NOR)	CK Viktoria	3h 14' 40"
2	Vera Koedooder (NED)	Bigla Cycling Team	+ 3"
3	Henriette Woering (NED)	RC Jan van Arckel	+ 22"
4	Brianna Walle (USA)	Team Optum p/b Kelly Benefit Strategies	+ 22"
5	Amy Charity (USA)	USA (national team)	+ 24"
6	Tamina Kate Oliver (GBR)	Mixteam Eleven — Bicykl Kriz	+ 27"
7	Alexandra Nessmar (SWE)	Firefighters Upsala CK	+ 27"
8	Roos Hoogeboom (NED)	RC Jan van Arckel	+ 27"
9	Moniek Tenniglo (NED)	RC Jan van Arckel	+ 27"
10	Lotte van Hoek (NED)	RC Jan van Arckel	+ 27"

General classification after stage 1

	Rider	Team	Time
1	Ingrid Lorvik (NOR)	CK Viktoria	3h 14' 30"
2	Vera Koedooder (NED)	Bigla Cycling Team	+ 7"
3	Henriette Woering (NED)	RC Jan van Arckel	+ 28"
4	Brianna Walle (USA)	Team Optum p/b Kelly Benefit Strategies	+ 30"
5	Amy Charity (USA)	USA (national team)	+ 34"
6	Tamina Kate Oliver (GBR)	Mixteam Eleven — Bicykl Kriz	+ 35"
7	Alexandra Nessmar (SWE)	Firefighters Upsala CK	+ 37"
8	Roos Hoogeboom (NED)	RC Jan van Arckel	+ 37"
9	Moniek Tenniglo (NED)	RC Jan van Arckel	+ 37"
10	Lotte van Hoek (NED)	RC Jan van Arckel	+ 37"

=== Stage 2 ===
11 July 2014 – Jiříkov to Jiříkov, 100.7 km (62.6 mi)

Stage 2 result

	Rider	Team	Time
1	Iris van der Stelt (NED)	WV Breda	2h 58' 24"
2	Brianna Walle (USA)	Team Optum p/b Kelly Benefit Strategies	s.t.
3	Vera Koedooder (NED)	Bigla Cycling Team	s.t.
4	Henriette Woering (NED)	RC Jan van Arckel	s.t.
5	Amy Charity (USA)	USA (national team)	s.t.
6	Alexandra Nessmar (SWE)	Firefighters Upsala CK	s.t.
7	Martina Sáblíková (CZE)	Czech (national team)	s.t.
8	Yvonne Fiedler (GER)	LV Berlin	s.t.
9	Mary Rose Postma (NED)	WV Breda	s.t.
10	Ingrid Lorvik (NOR)	CK Viktoria	s.t.

General classification after stage 2

	Rider	Team	Time
1	Ingrid Lorvik (NOR)	CK Viktoria	6h 12' 54"
2	Vera Koedooder (NED)	Bigla Cycling Team	+ 3"
3	Brianna Walle (USA)	Team Optum p/b Kelly Benefit Strategies	+ 21"
4	Moniek Tenniglo (NED)	RC Jan van Arckel	+ 27"
5	Henriette Woering (NED)	RC Jan van Arckel	+ 28"
6	Amy Charity (USA)	USA (national team)	+ 32"
7	Tamina Kate Oliver (GBR)	Mixteam Eleven — Bicykl Kriz	+ 35"
8	Lotte van Hoek (NED)	RC Jan van Arckel	+ 35"
9	Alexandra Nessmar (SWE)	Firefighters Upsala CK	+ 37"
10	Iris van der Stelt (NED)	WV Breda	+ 46"

=== Stage 3 ===
12 July 2014 – Bogatynia to Bogatynia, 17.8 km (11.1 mi), individual time trial (ITT)

Stage 3 result

	Rider	Team	Time
1	Martina Sáblíková (CZE)	Czech (national team)	26' 52"
2	Brianna Walle (USA)	Team Optum p/b Kelly Benefit Strategies	+ 12"
3	Vera Koedooder (NED)	Bigla Cycling Team	+ 28"
4	Amy Charity (USA)	USA (national team)	+ 1' 07"
5	Vittoria Bussi (ITA)	S.C. Michela Fanini Rox	+ 1' 13"
6	Thrude Natholmen (NOR)	CK Vittoria	+ 1' 28"
7	Moniek Tenniglo (NED)	RC Jan van Arckel	+ 1' 30"
8	Henriette Woering (NED)	RC Jan van Arckel	+ 1' 39"
9	Kendall Ryan (USA)	Team TIBCO - To The Top	+ 1' 43"
10	Svetlana Belevantseva (RUS)	Rusko	+ 2' 01"

General classification after stage 3

	Rider	Team	Time
1	Vera Koedooder (NED)	Bigla Cycling Team	6h 40' 17"
2	Brianna Walle (USA)	Team Optum p/b Kelly Benefit Strategies	+ 2"
3	Martina Sáblíková (CZE)	Czech (national team)	+ 31"
4	Amy Charity (USA)	USA (national team)	+ 1' 08"
5	Moniek Tenniglo (NED)	RC Jan van Arckel	+ 1' 25"
6	Henriette Woering (NED)	RC Jan van Arckel	+ 1' 35"
7	Ingrid Lorvik (NOR)	CK Viktoria	+ 1' 42"
8	Alexandra Nessmar (SWE)	Firefighters Upsala CK	+ 2' 40"
9	Roos Hoogeboom (NED)	RC Jan van Arckel	+ 2' 53"
10	Abigail Mickey (USA)	USA (national team)	+ 2' 57"

=== Stage 4 ===
12 July 2014 – Rumburk to Rumburk, 92.4 km (57.4 mi)

Stage 4 result

	Rider	Team	Time
1	Winanda Spoor (NED)	RC Jan van Arckel	26' 52"
2	Mirthe Wagenaar (NED)	WV Breda	+ 12"
3	Anne Ewing (GBR)	WV Breda	+ 28"
4	Lauren de Crescenzo (USA)	USA (national team)	+ 1' 07"
5	Zuzana Neckářová (CZE)	Czech Republic (national team)	+ 1' 13"
6	Henriette Woering (NED)	RC Jan van Arckel	+ 1' 28"
7	Iris van der Stelt (NED)	WV Breda	+ 1' 30"
8	Moniek Tenniglo (NED)	RC Jan van Arckel	+ 1' 39"
9	Vera Koedooder (NED)	Bigla Cycling Team	+ 1' 43"
10	Heather Fischer (USA)	USA (national team)	+ 2' 01"

General classification after stage 4

	Rider	Team	Time
1	Vera Koedooder (NED)	Bigla Cycling Team	9h 12' 26"
2	Brianna Walle (USA)	Team Optum p/b Kelly Benefit Strategies	+ 4"
3	Martina Sáblíková (CZE)	Czech (national team)	+ 39"
4	Amy Charity (USA)	USA (national team)	+ 1' 20"
5	Moniek Tenniglo (NED)	RC Jan van Arckel	+ 1' 29"
6	Henriette Woering (NED)	RC Jan van Arckel	+ 1' 37"
7	Ingrid Lorvik (NOR)	CK Viktoria	+ 1' 50"
8	Mirthe Wagenaar (USA)	WV Breda	+ 1' 57"
9	Alexandra Nessmar (SWE)	Firefighters Upsala CK	+ 2' 48"
10	Roos Hoogeboom (NED)	RC Jan van Arckel	+ 2' 56"

=== Stage 5 ===
13 July 2014 – Varnsdorp to Krásná Lípa, 98.7 km (61.3 mi)

Stage 5 result

	Rider	Team	Time
1	Brianna Walle (USA)	Team Optum p/b Kelly Benefit Strategies	2h 53' 26"
2	Amy Charity (USA)	USA (national team)	s.t.
3	Ingrid Lorvik (NOR)	CK Victoria	s.t.
4	Martina Sáblíková (CZE)	Czech (national team)	s.t.
5	Alexandra Nessmar (SWE)	Firefighters Upsala CK	+ 42"
6	Vera Koedooder (NED)	Bigla Cycling Team	+ 1' 28"
7	Henriette Woering (NED)	RC Jan van Arckel	+ 1' 30"
8	Iris van der Stelt (NED)	WV Breda	+ 1' 39"
9	Roos Hoogeboom (NED)	RC Jan van Arckel	+ 1' 43"
10	Abigail Mickey (USA)	USA (national team)	+ 2' 01"

Final general classification

	Rider	Team	Time
1	Brianna Walle (USA)	Team Optum p/b Kelly Benefit Strategies	12h 05' 41"
2	Martina Sáblíková (CZE)	Czech (national team)	+ 50"
3	Vera Koedooder (NED)	Bigla Cycling Team	+ 1' 10"
4	Amy Charity (USA)	USA (national team)	+ 1' 25"
5	Ingrid Lorvik (NOR)	CK Viktoria	+ 1' 57"
6	Henriette Woering (NED)	RC Jan van Arckel	+ 2' 52"
7	Mirthe Wagenaar (USA)	WV Breda	+ 3' 12"
8	Alexandra Nessmar (SWE)	Firefighters Upsala CK	+ 3' 41"
9	Roos Hoogeboom (NED)	RC Jan van Arckel	+ 4' 11"
10	Abigail Mickey (USA)	USA (national team)	+ 4' 23"

== Classification progress ==
Stage	Winner	General classification	Points classification	Mountains classification	Young rider classification	Team classification
1	Ingrid Lorvik	Ingrid Lorvik	Ingrid Lorvik	Martina Sáblíková	Henriette Woering	CK Victoria
2	Iris van der Stelt	Ingrid Lorvik	Brianna Walle	Martina Sáblíková	Henriette Woering	CK Victoria
3 (ITT)	Martina Sáblíková	Vera Koedooder	Brianna Walle	Martina Sáblíková	Henriette Woering	CK Victoria
4						
5						
Final						
