= List of 2017 UCI Women's Teams and riders =

The purpose of this template is to collect source text used in several articles in one place, in order to minimize maintenance and storage space. The template is typically used in the articles: List of 2017 UCI Women's Teams and riders and 2017 in women's road cycling and in the current year also on the UCI Women's Teams page. List updated 16 November 2017

The 2017 UCI Women's Teams are:

Code	Official team name	Country
ALE	Alé–Cipollini (2017 season)	Italy
VAI	Aromitalia Vaiano (2017 season)	Italy
ASA	Astana (2017 season)	Kazakhstan
BPK	Bepink–Cogeas (2017 season)	Italy
BDP	Bizkaia–Durango (2017 season)	Spain
CZG	Conceria Zabri–Fanini–Guerciotti (2017 season)	Albania
DLT	Boels–Dolmans (2017 season)	Netherlands
BTC	BTC City Ljubljana (2017 season)	Slovenia
LPR2	Canyon//SRAM (2017 season)	Germany
CBT	Cervélo–Bigla Pro Cycling (2017 season)	Germany
GPC	China Chongming–Liv (2017 season)	Hong Kong
CVB	Colavita/Bianchi (2017 season)	United States
CPC	Cylance Pro Cycling (2017 season)	United States
DRP	Drops (2017 season)	United Kingdom
FUT	FDJ Nouvelle-Aquitaine Futuroscope (2017 season)	France
HBS	Hagens Berman–Supermint (2017 season)	United States
HPU	Team Hitec Products (2017 season)	Norway
ISG	Giusfredi–Bianchi (2017 season)	Italy
LWW	Lares–Waowdeals (2017 season)	Belgium
LZE	Lensworld–Kuota (2017 season)	Belgium
LTK	Lointek (2017 season)	Spain
LBL	Lotto–Soudal Ladies (2017 season)	Belgium
ORS	Orica–Scott (2017 season)	Australia
PHV	Parkhotel Valkenburg–Destil (2017 season)	Netherlands
RLW	Rally Cycling (2017 season)	United States
MIC	S.C. Michela Fanini Rox (2017 season)	Italy
SAS	SAS–Macogep (2017 season)	Canada
SEF	Servetto Giusta (2017 season)	Italy
BMS	Team Virtu Cycling (2017 season)	Denmark
TLP	Team Sunweb (2017 season)	Netherlands
TIB	Tibco–Silicon Valley Bank (2017 season)	United States
TWC	Thailand Women's Cycling Team (2017 season)	Thailand
TOG	Top Girls Fassa Bortolo (2017 season)	Italy
VLL	Sport Vlaanderen–Guill D'or (2017 season)	Belgium
T20	Sho-Air Twenty20 (2017 season)	United States
UHC	UnitedHealthcare (2017 season)	United States
VAL	Valcar–PBM (2017 season)	Italy
DNA	Visit Dallas DNA Pro Cycling (2017 season)	United States
SLP	Weber Shimano Ladies Power (2017 season)	Argentina
WHT	Wiggle High5 (2017 season)	United Kingdom
WM3	WM3 Energie (2017 season)	Netherlands

== Defunct teams ==
The below lists all teams which folded completely at the end of the 2016 season, or dropped down from UCI level to National level.

- Vitalogic Astrokalb Radunion NÖ
- Xirayas de San Luis–OPW

Preceded by 2016	List of UCI Women's Teams; 2017	Succeeded by 2018
