= Human Powered Health =

Human Powered Health, or its former names Optum-Kelly Benefit Strategies and Rally Cycling may refer to:

- Human Powered Health (men's team), a professional cycling team that competes on UCI Continental Tours
- Human Powered Health (women's team), a professional cycling team that competes on the UCI Women's World Tour
