= Rally UHC Cycling =

Rally UHC Cycling can refer to:

- Rally UHC Cycling (men's team)
- Rally UHC Cycling (women's team)
