= Andrew Bajadali =

American bicycle racer

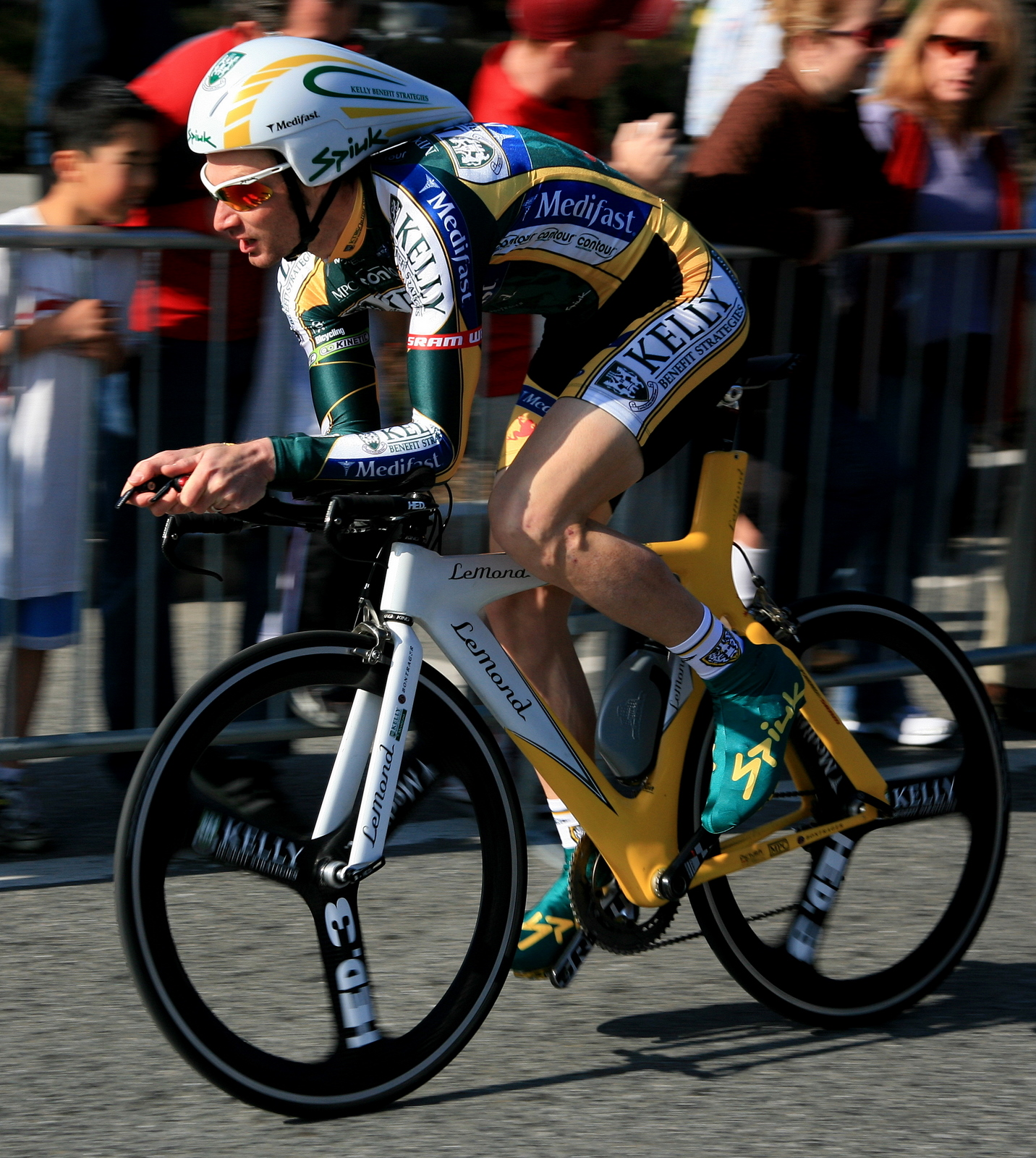
- Bajadali at the 2008 Tour of California

Personal information
- Full name: Andrew Bajadali
- Born: May 1, 1973 (age 53) Boulder, Colorado

Cycling career
- Sport: Cycling
- Current team: Human Powered Health (men); Human Powered Health (women)
- Discipline: Road
- Role: Rider
- Rider type: Climber

Amateur team
- 2005: Vitamin Cottage

Professional teams
- 2003–2004: Ofoto – Lombardi
- 2006–2007: Jelly Belly Cycling Team
- 2008–2012: Kelly Benefit Strategies–Medifast

Managerial teams
- 2018–: Rally Cycling (men)
- 2020–: Rally Cycling (women)

Andrew Bajadali (born May 1, 1973 in Boulder, Colorado) is an American former professional cyclist, who now works as a directeur sportif for UCI ProTeam Human Powered Health, and UCI Women's Continental Team Human Powered Health.

== Major results ==
2005
1st Overall Tour of Utah
1st Overall Boulder Stage Race
2nd Overall Mount Hood Cycling Classic

1st Stage 2

2nd Tour de Nez
2nd Nevada City Classic
2006
1st Tri-Peaks Challenge
3rd Tour de Toona
2007
1st Overall Redlands Bicycle Classic
1st Overall Tri-Peaks Challenge

1st Stage 5

2008
2nd Overall Tour des Pyrénées
2nd Tour de Nez
2009
1st Overall Tour of Thailand
2nd Road race, National Road Championships
2012
2nd Tobago Cycling Classic
