= Melanie Woering =

Dutch bicycle racer

Personal information
- Born: 18 January 1992 (age 34) Assen, Netherlands

Cycling career
- Sport: Cycling
- Discipline: Road
- Role: Rider

Amateur teams
- 2010–2011: SRAM–W.V. Eemland
- 2012: Ruiter Dakkapellen
- 2013: Endura Lady Force
- 2014: RC Jan van Arckel
- 2014: Team Rytger (guest)
- 2016: RC Jan van Arckel
- 2016: Restore Cycling Ladies (guest)
- 2018: RC Jan van Arckel

Professional team
- 2015: Team Rytger

Melanie Woering (born 18 January 1992) is a Dutch racing cyclist. Her twin sister, Henriette Woering, also competed professionally as a cyclist.

== See also ==
- List of 2015 UCI Women's Teams and riders
