= Brianna Walle =

American bicycle racer

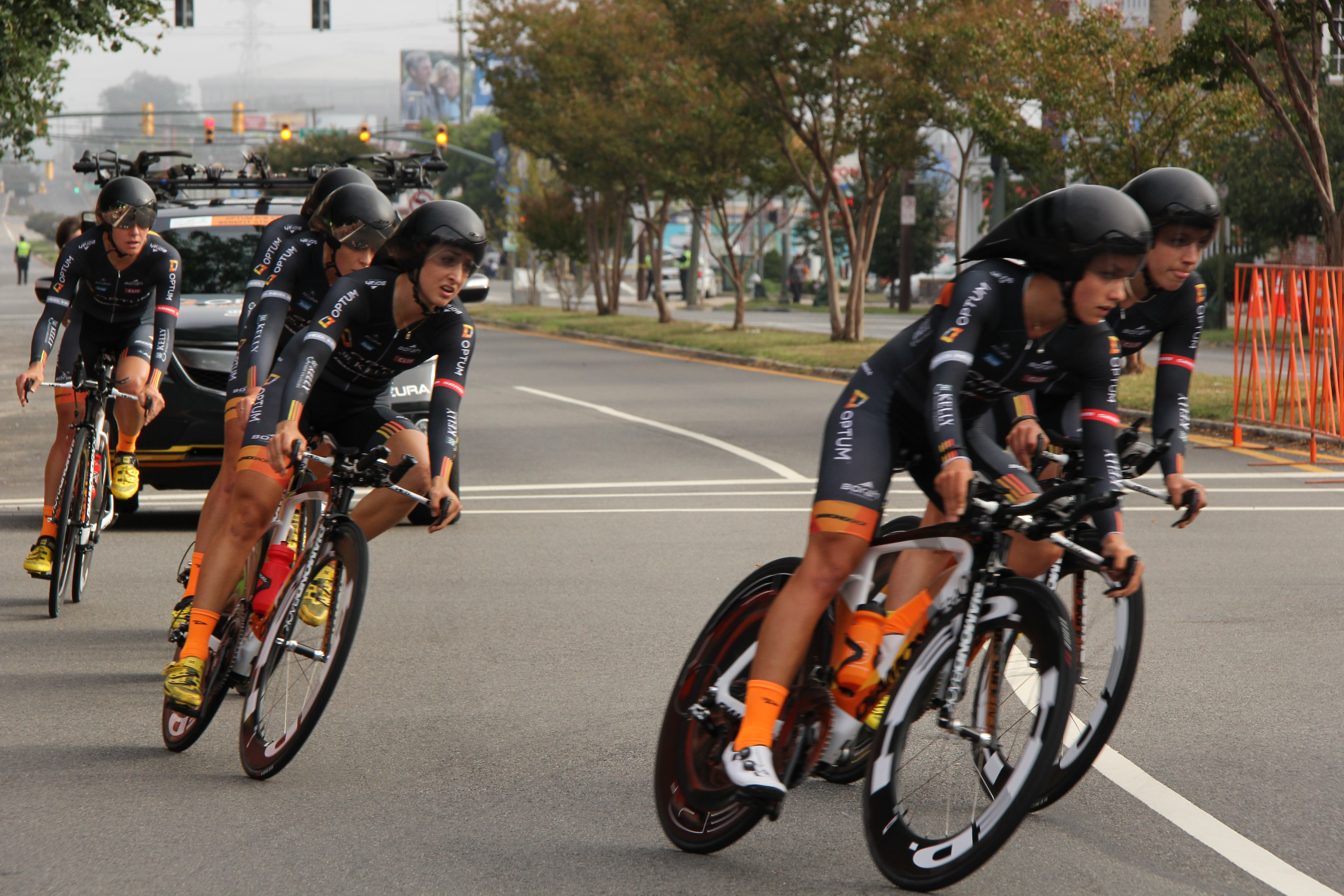
- Riding with Optum–KBS at the 2015 UCI Road World Championships

Personal information
- Full name: Brianna Walle
- Nickname: Brie
- Born: April 25, 1984 (age 42) Delray Beach, Florida, U.S.

Cycling career
- Sport: Cycling
- Current team: Retired
- Discipline: Road
- Role: Rider

Professional teams
- 2013–2015: Optum–Kelly Benefit Strategies
- 2016–2017: Tibco–Silicon Valley Bank

Brianna Walle (born April 25, 1984) is an American former racing cyclist.

== Major results ==
2013
10th Time trial, National Road Championships
2014
1st Overall Tour de Feminin-O cenu Českého Švýcarska

1st Sprints classification
1st Stage 5

7th Time trial, National Road Championships
2015
2nd Overall San Dimas Stage Race

1st Sprints classification
1st Stage 3

3rd Criterium, National Road Championships
5th Overall Redlands Bicycle Classic
5th Overall BeNe Ladies Tour
6th Overall Tour of the Gila
9th Overall La Route de France
9th Chrono Gatineau
10th Philadelphia Cycling Classic
2016
4th Overall Joe Martin Stage Race
4th Overall Tour of the Gila
5th Winston-Salem Cycling Classic
5th Philadelphia Cycling Classic
8th Chrono Gatineau
