= 2015 BeNe Ladies Tour =

Race details
- Dates: 17–19 July 2016
- Stages: 4
- Winning time: 7h 39' 00"

Results
	Winner	Jolien D'Hoore (BEL)
	Second	Floortje Mackaij (NED)
	Third	Elena Cecchini (ITA)
	Points	Jolien D'Hoore (BEL)
	Youth	Floortje Mackaij (NED)
	Team	Wiggle–Honda

The 2015 BeNe Ladies Tour is the second edition of the BeNe Ladies Tour, a women's cycling stage race in the Netherlands and Belgium. It is rated by the UCI as a category 2.2 race and is held between 17 and 19 July 2015.

== Route ==
Stage characteristics and winners
Stage	Date	Course	Distance	Type	Stage winner
1	17 July	Philippine to Philippine	84.4 km (52.4 mi)	Flat stage	Jolien D'Hoore (BEL)
2a	18 July	Sint-Laureins to Sint-Laureins	6.3 km (3.9 mi)	Individual time trial	Jolien D'Hoore (BEL)
2b	18 July	Sint-Laureins to Sint-Laureins	101.3 km (62.9 mi)	Flat stage	Jolien D'Hoore (BEL)
3	19 July	Zelzate to Zelzate	108.3 km (67.3 mi)	Flat stage	Alison Tetrick (USA)

== Stages ==
=== Stage 1 ===
17 July 2015, – Philippine to Philippine, 78.1 km (48.5 mi)

Stage 1 result

Rank	Rider	Team	Time
1	Jolien D'Hoore (BEL)	Wiggle–Honda	1h 57' 57"
2	Floortje Mackaij (NED)	Team Liv–Plantur	s.t.
3	Elena Cecchini (ITA)	Lotto–Soudal Ladies	s.t.
4	Chloe Hosking (AUS)	Wiggle–Honda	+ 8"
5	Lucy Garner (GBR)	Team Liv–Plantur	+ 24"
6	Ashlynn van Baarle (NED)		s.t.
7	Leah Kirchmann (CAN)	Optum–KBS	s.t.
8	Sara Penton (SWE)		s.t.
9	Marta Bastianelli (ITA)	Aromitalia Vaiano	s.t.
10	Anouk Rijff (NED)	Lotto–Soudal Ladies	s.t.

General classification after Stage 1

Rank	Rider	Team	Time
1	Jolien D'Hoore (BEL)	Wiggle–Honda	1h 57' 41"
2	Floortje Mackaij (NED)	Team Liv–Plantur	+ 8"
3	Elena Cecchini (ITA)	Lotto–Soudal Ladies	+ 10"
4	Chloe Hosking (AUS)	Wiggle–Honda	+ 24"
5	Brianna Walle (USA)	Optum–KBS	+ 38"
6	Lucy Garner (GBR)	Team Liv–Plantur	+ 40"
7	Ashlynn van Baarle (NED)		s.t.
8	Leah Kirchmann (CAN)	Optum–KBS	s.t.
9	Sara Penton (SWE)		s.t.
10	Marta Bastianelli (ITA)	Aromitalia Vaiano	s.t.

=== Stage 2a ===
18 July 2015 – Sint-Laureins to Sint-Laureins, (individual time trial) 6.3 km (3.9 mi)

Stage 2a result

Rank	Rider	Team	Time
1	Jolien D'Hoore (BEL)	Wiggle–Honda	8' 21"
2	Ann-Sophie Duyck (BEL)	Topsport Vlaanderen–Pro-Duo	+ 2"
3	Leah Kirchmann (CAN)	Optum–KBS	+ 5"
4	Brianna Walle (USA)	Optum–KBS	+ 7"
5	Annette Edmondson (AUS)	Wiggle–Honda	+ 10"
6	Floortje Mackaij (NED)	Team Liv–Plantur	+ 11"
7	Camilla Møllebro (DEN)		+ 14"
8	Alison Tetrick (USA)	Optum–KBS	+ 18"
9	Minke Slingerland (NED)		+ 19"
10	Natalie van Gogh (NED)	Parkhotel Valkenburg Continental Team	s.t.

General classification after Stage 2a

Rank	Rider	Team	Time
1	Jolien D'Hoore (BEL)	Wiggle–Honda	2h 06' 02"
2	Floortje Mackaij (NED)	Team Liv–Plantur	+ 19"
3	Elena Cecchini (ITA)	Lotto–Soudal Ladies	+ 37"
4	Ann-Sophie Duyck (BEL)	Topsport Vlaanderen–Pro-Duo	+ 42"
5	Brianna Walle (USA)	Optum–KBS	+ 45"
6	Leah Kirchmann (CAN)	Optum–KBS	s.t.
7	Annette Edmondson (AUS)	Wiggle–Honda	+ 50"
8	Camilla Møllebro (DEN)		+ 54"
9	Alison Tetrick (USA)	Optum–KBS	+ 58"
10	Minke Slingerland (NED)		+ 59"

=== Stage 2b ===
18 July 2015 – Sint-Laureins to Sint-Laureins, 101.3 km (62.9 mi)

Stage 2b result

Rank	Rider	Team	Time
1	Jolien D'Hoore (BEL)	Wiggle–Honda	2h 36' 13"
2	Floortje Mackaij (NED)	Team Liv–Plantur	s.t.
3	Sara Mustonen (SWE)	Team Liv–Plantur	s.t.
4	Annelies Dom (BEL)	Lensworld.eu–Zannata	s.t.
5	Marta Bastianelli (ITA)	Aromitalia Vaiano	s.t.
6	Rasa Leleivytė (LTU)	Aromitalia Vaiano	s.t.
7	Lucy Garner (GBR)	Team Liv–Plantur	s.t.
8	Kelly Druyts (BEL)	Topsport Vlaanderen–Pro-Duo	s.t.
9	Eva Buurman (NED)		s.t.
10	Marjolein van't Geloof (NED)		s.t.

General classification after Stage 2b

Rank	Rider	Team	Time
1	Jolien D'Hoore (BEL)	Wiggle–Honda	4h 42' 06"
2	Floortje Mackaij (NED)	Team Liv–Plantur	+ 22"
3	Elena Cecchini (ITA)	Lotto–Soudal Ladies	+ 45"
4	Ann-Sophie Duyck (BEL)	Topsport Vlaanderen–Pro-Duo	+ 51"
5	Brianna Walle (USA)	Optum–KBS	+ 54"
6	Leah Kirchmann (CAN)	Optum–KBS	s.t.
7	Annette Edmondson (AUS)	Wiggle–Honda	+ 59"
8	Camilla Møllebro (DEN)		+ 1' 03"
9	Alison Tetrick (USA)	Optum–KBS	+ 1' 07"
10	Minke Slingerland (NED)		+ 1' 08"

=== Stage 3 ===
19 July 2015 – Zelzate to Zelzate, 108.3 km (67.3 mi)

Stage 3 result

Rank	Rider	Team	Time
1	Alison Tetrick (USA)	Optum–KBS	2h 56' 44"
2	Lucy Garner (GBR)	Team Liv–Plantur	+ 12"
3	Chloe Hosking (AUS)	Wiggle–Honda	s.t.
4	Marta Bastianelli (ITA)	Aromitalia Vaiano	s.t.
5	Monique van de Ree (NED)		s.t.
6	Fiona Dutriaux (FRA)		s.t.
7	Sara Mustonen (SWE)	Team Liv–Plantur	s.t.
8	Floortje Mackaij (NED)	Team Liv–Plantur	s.t.
9	Chanella Stougje (NED)	Parkhotel Valkenburg Continental Team	s.t.
10	Camilla Møllebro (DEN)		s.t.

General classification after Stage 3

Rank	Rider	Team	Time
1	Jolien D'Hoore (BEL)	Wiggle–Honda	7h 39' 00"
2	Floortje Mackaij (NED)	Team Liv–Plantur	+ 23"
3	Elena Cecchini (ITA)	Lotto–Soudal Ladies	+ 46"
4	Alison Tetrick (USA)	Optum–KBS	+ 47"
5	Brianna Walle (USA)	Optum–KBS	+ 53"
6	Ann-Sophie Duyck (BEL)	Topsport Vlaanderen–Pro-Duo	s.t.
7	Annette Edmondson (AUS)	Wiggle–Honda	+ 1' 01"
8	Camilla Møllebro (DEN)		+ 1' 05"
9	Minke Slingerland (NED)		+ 1' 10"
10	Natalie van Gogh (NED)	Parkhotel Valkenburg Continental Team	s.t.

== Classification leadership ==
Stage	Winner	General classification	Points classification	Young rider classification
1	Jolien D'Hoore	Jolien D'Hoore	Jolien D'Hoore	Floortje Mackaij
2a	Jolien D'Hoore	Jolien D'Hoore	Jolien D'Hoore	Floortje Mackaij
2b	Jolien D'Hoore	Jolien D'Hoore	Jolien D'Hoore	Floortje Mackaij
3	Alison Tetrick	Jolien D'Hoore	Jolien D'Hoore	Floortje Mackaij
Final Classification		Jolien D'Hoore	Jolien D'Hoore	Floortje Mackaij

== See also ==
- 2015 in women's road cycling
