= Viivi Puskala =

Finnish cyclist

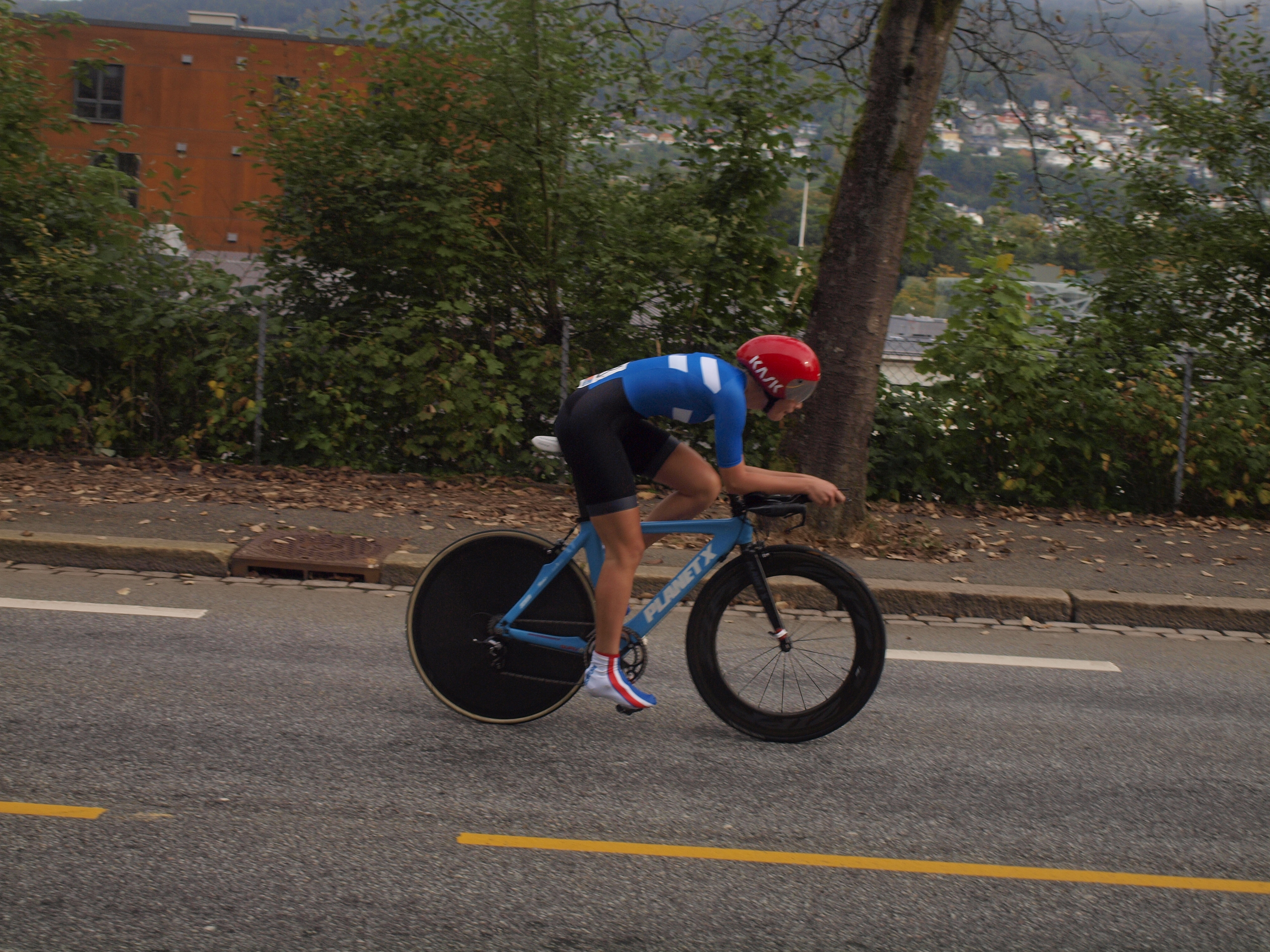

Personal information
- Born: 16 January 1999 (age 27)

Cycling career
- Sport: Cycling
- Role: Rider

Viivi Puskala (born 16 January 1999) is a Finnish racing cyclist. She rode in the women's road race event at the 2018 UCI Road World Championships.
