= 2018 Tour Cycliste Féminin International de l'Ardèche =

Race details
- Dates: 13–18 September 2018
- Stages: 7 stages
- Distance: 680.3 km (422.7 mi)

The 2018 Tour Cycliste Féminin International de l'Ardèche is a women's cycle stage race held in France from 13 September to 18 September, 2018. The tour has an UCI rating of 2.1.

== Stages ==
List of stages
Stage	Date	Course	Distance	Type	Winner
1	13 September	Saint-Marcel-d'Ardèche to Beauchastel	65 km (40.4 mi)	Flat stage	Alexis Ryan (USA)
2	13 September	Saint-Fortunat-sur-Eyrieux to Cruas	31.3 km (19.4 mi)	Flat stage	Arlenis Sierra (CUB)
3	14 September	Saint-Sauveur-de-Montagut to Villeneuve-de-Berg	125 km (77.7 mi)	Mountain stage	Ruth Winder (USA)
4	15 September	Châteauneuf-de-Gadagne to Mont-Serein Station	117 km (72.7 mi)	Mountain stage	Eider Merino (ESP)
5	16 September	Grandrieu to Mont Lozère	139 km (86.4 mi)	Mountain stage	Katarzyna Niewiadoma (POL)
6	17 September	Savasse to Montboucher-sur-Jabron	113 km (70.2 mi)	Mountain stage	Ruth Winder (USA)
7	18 September	Chomérac to Privas	90 km (55.9 mi)	Mountain stage	Erica Magnaldi (ITA)
Total			680.3 km (422.7 mi)		

== Classification leadership ==
Stage	Winner	General classification	Young rider classification	Points classification	Mountains classification	Sprints classification	Combination classification	Combativity classification	Teams classification
1	Alexis Ryan	Alexis Ryan	Katia Ragusa	Arlenis Sierra	Alison Jackson	Tanja Erath	Susanne Andersen	Berangere Staelens	Canyon–SRAM
2	Arlenis Sierra	Arlenis Sierra	Susanne Andersen	Alexis Ryan	Heidi Franz	Melissa Van Neck	Kseniya Dobrynina	Berangere Staelens	Canyon–SRAM
3	Ruth Winder	Ruth Winder	Sara Poidevin	Arlenis Sierra	Katarzyna Niewiadoma	Melissa Van Neck	Katarzyna Niewiadoma	Eider Merino	United States (National Team)
4	Eider Merino	Margarita Victoria Garcia	Sara Poidevin	Ruth Winder	Katarzyna Niewiadoma	Tanja Erath	Olga Shekel	Kseniya Dobrynina	Spain (National Team)
5	Katarzyna Niewiadoma	Margarita Victoria Garcia	Sara Poidevin	Arlenis Sierra	Katarzyna Niewiadoma	Melissa Van Neck	Erica Magnaldi	Kseniya Dobrynina	Spain (National Team)
6	Ruth Winder	Katarzyna Niewiadoma	Sara Poidevin	Ruth Winder	Katarzyna Niewiadoma	Tanja Erath	Erica Magnaldi	Tesfoam Gebru Eyeru	Spain (National Team)
7	Erica Magnaldi	Katarzyna Niewiadoma	Sara Poidevin	Ruth Winder	Katarzyna Niewiadoma	Kseniya Dobrynina	Katarzyna Niewiadoma	Kseniya Dobrynina	Spain (National Team)
Final		Katarzyna Niewiadoma	Sara Poidevin	Ruth Winder	Katarzyna Niewiadoma	Kseniya Dobrynina	Katarzyna Niewiadoma	Kseniya Dobrynina	Spain (National Team)
