= Camilla Møllebro =

Danish cyclist (born 1984)

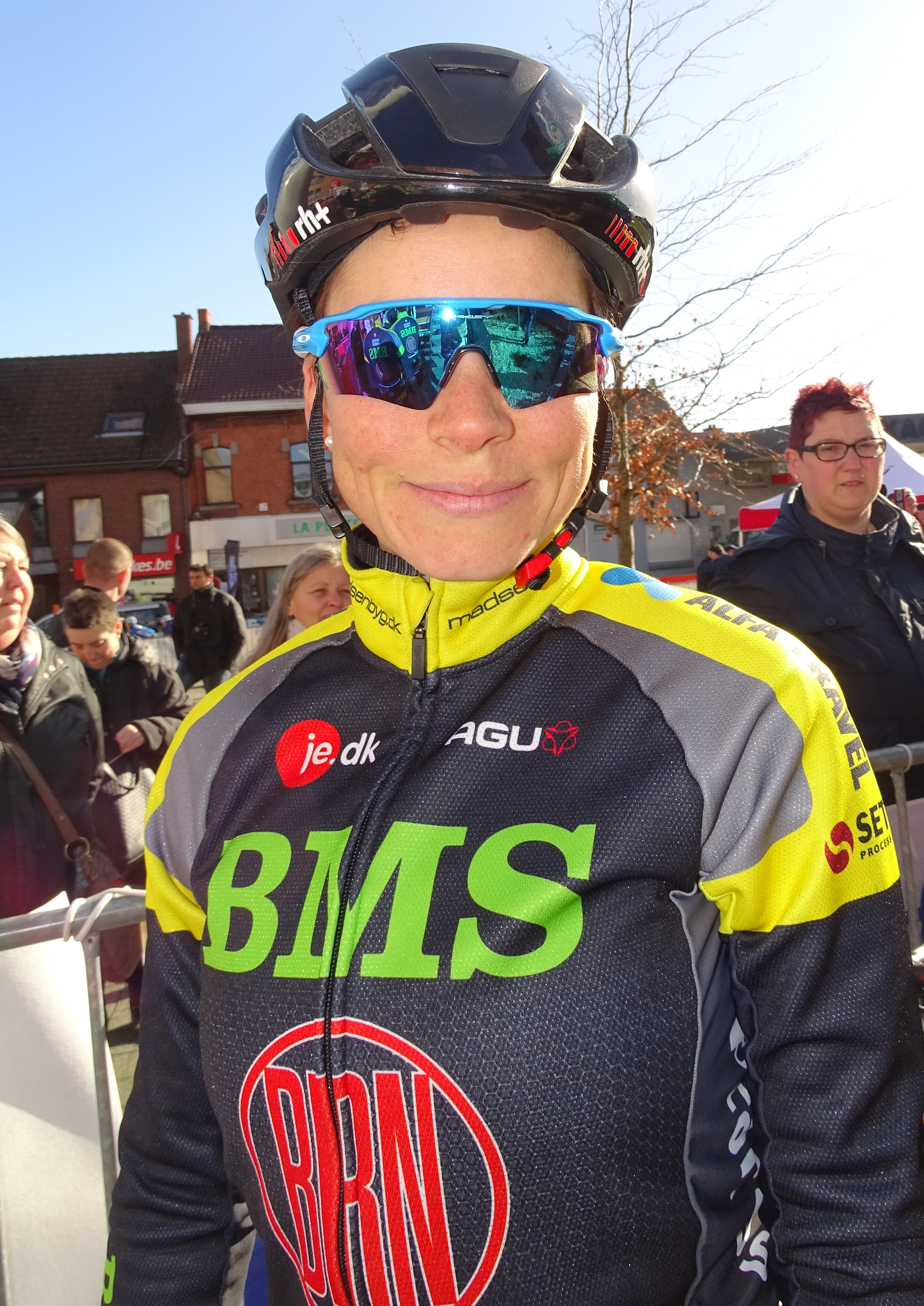
- Møllebro in 2016

Personal information
- Full name: Camilla Møllebro Pedersen
- Born: 21 May 1984 (age 42)

Cycling career
- Sport: Cycling
- Current team: Retired
- Discipline: Road
- Role: Rider

Amateur team
- 2015: Team BMS BIRN

Professional teams
- 2016: Team BMS BIRN
- 2017: Team VéloCONCEPT
- 2018: Hitec Products–Birk Sport

Camilla Møllebro Pedersen (born 21 May 1984) is a Danish former professional racing cyclist. She rode in the women's time trial at the 2015 UCI Road World Championships.

== Major results ==
2014
3rd Time trial, National Road Championships
2015
2nd Time trial, National Road Championships
8th Overall BeNe Ladies Tour
10th Time trial, European Games
2016
10th Pajot Hills Classic
2017
1st Road race, National Road Championships
1st Mountains classification Tour of Zhoushan Island
