= Camila Coelho =

Brazilian-American content creator

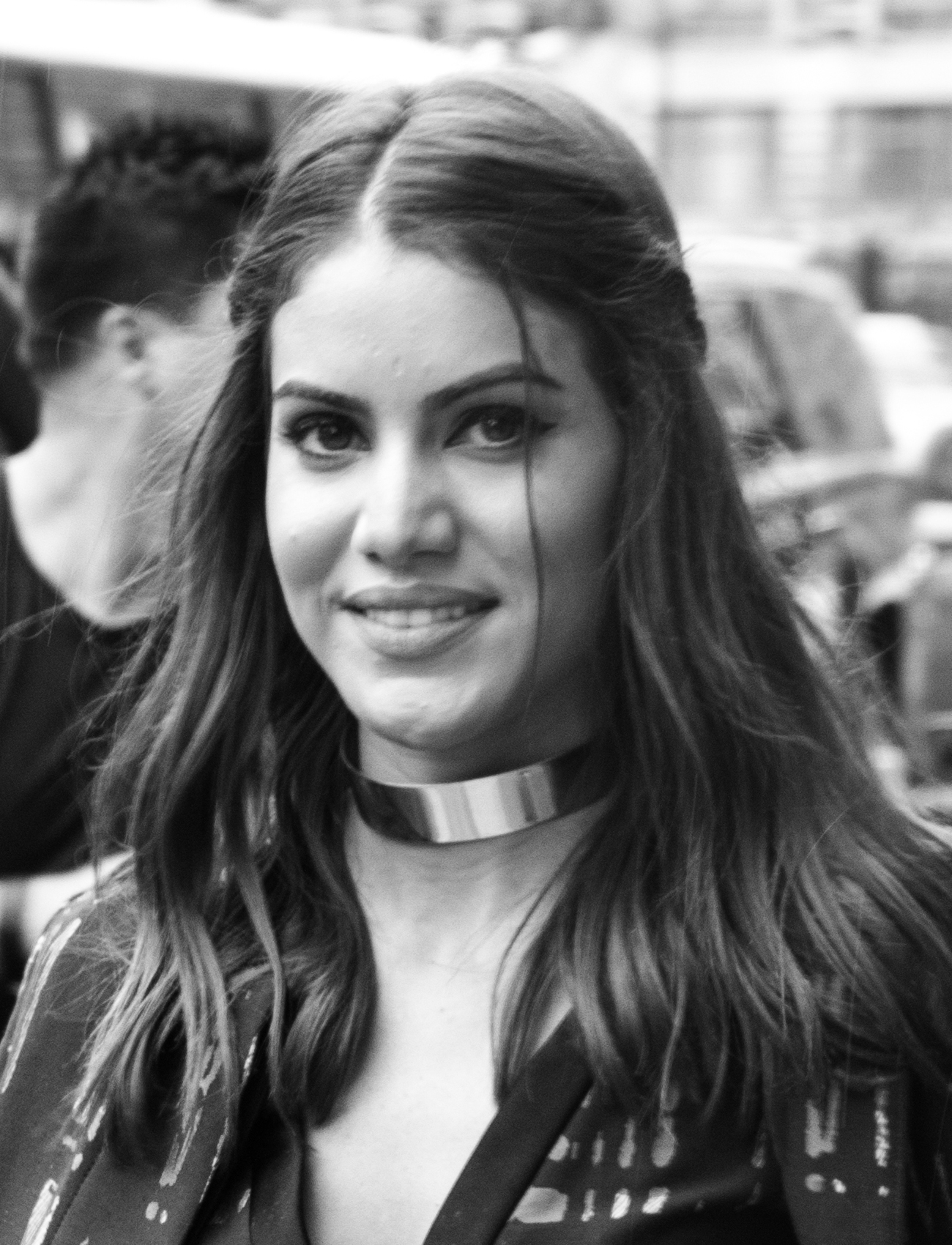
Camila Coelho in 2015

Camila Coelho (born c. 1988) is a Brazilian-American fashion and beauty YouTube and internet personality.

== Early life ==
In 2004, Coelho immigrated from her hometown of Virginópolis in the Brazilian state of Minas Gerais to Boston, Massachusetts. As a 14-year-old, she worked at her local Macy's Dior beauty counter as a makeup artist, Camila walked the Miss Brasil USA catwalk in 2004 and 2007, the biggest event that promotes the beauty of Brazilian women in the United States of America and in 2010, began uploading videos to YouTube in order to stay in touch with her family and friends back in Brazil.

== Career ==
As an entrepreneur, she is the founder of two brands. Her namesake fashion label, Camila Coelho Collection, retails through e-retailer Revolve, and her beauty brand Elaluz retails direct-to-consumer and through nationwide U.S. beauty retailer Ulta Beauty. Together, both businesses generated more than $10 million during the year 2021.

Following a photo taken during Paris Fashion Week in March 2023, British, Australian and U.S. media criticized Coelho for holding her baby son close to her hotel's balcony.

Coelho attended the Met Gala in 2019 with Diane von Furstenberg, becoming one of the first digital creators to attend the event. The trilingual Coelho who speaks in English, Portuguese and Spanish, was called a Top 100 Latina Powerhouse by Hola! Magazine in 2021. Forbes named Coelho as one of the Top 30 Content Creators in 2022, the same year that Bloomberg Línea titled her as one of the "100 most influential Latinos." and Comesitify ranked Coelho as the 5th most powerful beauty influencer globally. Forbes Brasil first placed Coelho in their annual "30 Under 30" list in 2014.

== Personal life ==
Coelho opened up about her epilepsy diagnosis in 2020 on an episode of CBS Mornings and in People magazine, where she opened up about her fear of having a baby and losing it due to her neurological disorder. Due to her advocacy for those with Epilepsy, she was later named a member of the board of the Epilepsy Foundation. Coelho and her husband, Icaro Brenner, gave birth to their son Kai in 2022.
