= Amy Charity =

American racing cyclist

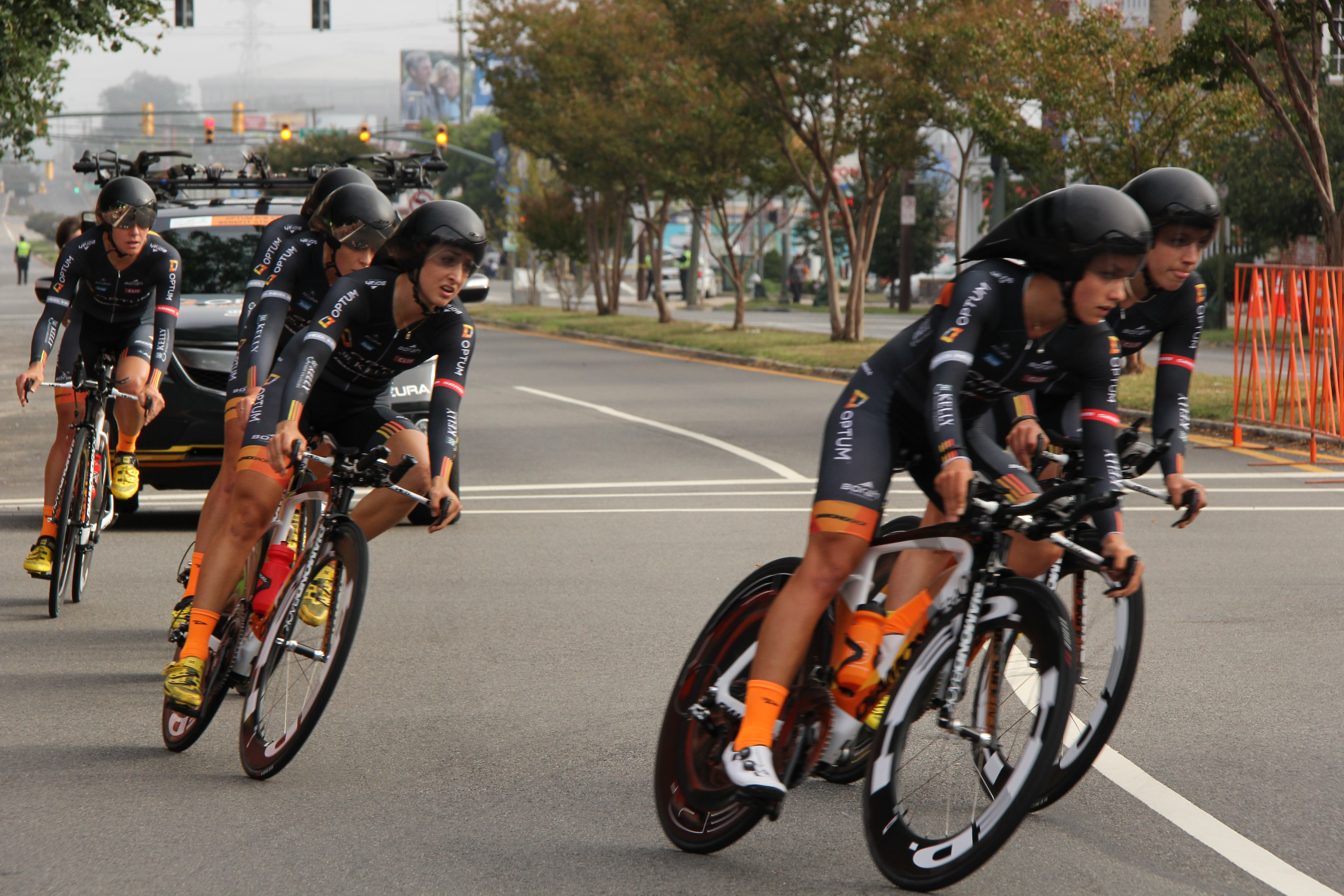
- Riding with Optum–KBS at the 2015 UCI Road World Championships

Personal information
- Full name: Amy M. Charity
- Born: November 25, 1976 (age 49) Fort Collins, Colorado, U.S.

Cycling career
- Sport: Cycling
- Current team: Retired
- Discipline: Road
- Role: Rider

Amateur teams
- 2013–2014: Vanderkitten
- 2019: DNA Pro Cycling

Professional team
- 2015: Optum–KBS

Amy M. Charity (born November 25, 1976) is an American former professional racing cyclist, who rode professionally for the Optum–KBS team in 2015. She raced in the 2015 UCI Road World Championships. Since retiring, Charity co-founded the SBT GRVL off-road event in Steamboat Springs, Colorado.

== Major results ==
2013
1st Road race, Colorado State Road Championships
1st Tour de Park City
2014
4th Overall Tour de Feminin-O cenu Českého Švýcarska
2015
1st Team time trial, National Road Championships
10th Overall Redlands Bicycle Classic

== See also ==
- List of 2015 UCI Women's Teams and riders
