= Henriette Woering =

Dutch cyclist

Personal information
- Born: 18 January 1992 (age 34)

Cycling career
- Sport: Cycling
- Role: Rider

Henriette Woering (born 18 January 1992) is a Dutch professional racing cyclist. She rides for Team Rytger. Her twin sister, Melanie Woering, also rides for Team Rytger.

== See also ==
- List of 2015 UCI Women's Teams and riders
