= Ingrid Moe =

Norwegian cyclist

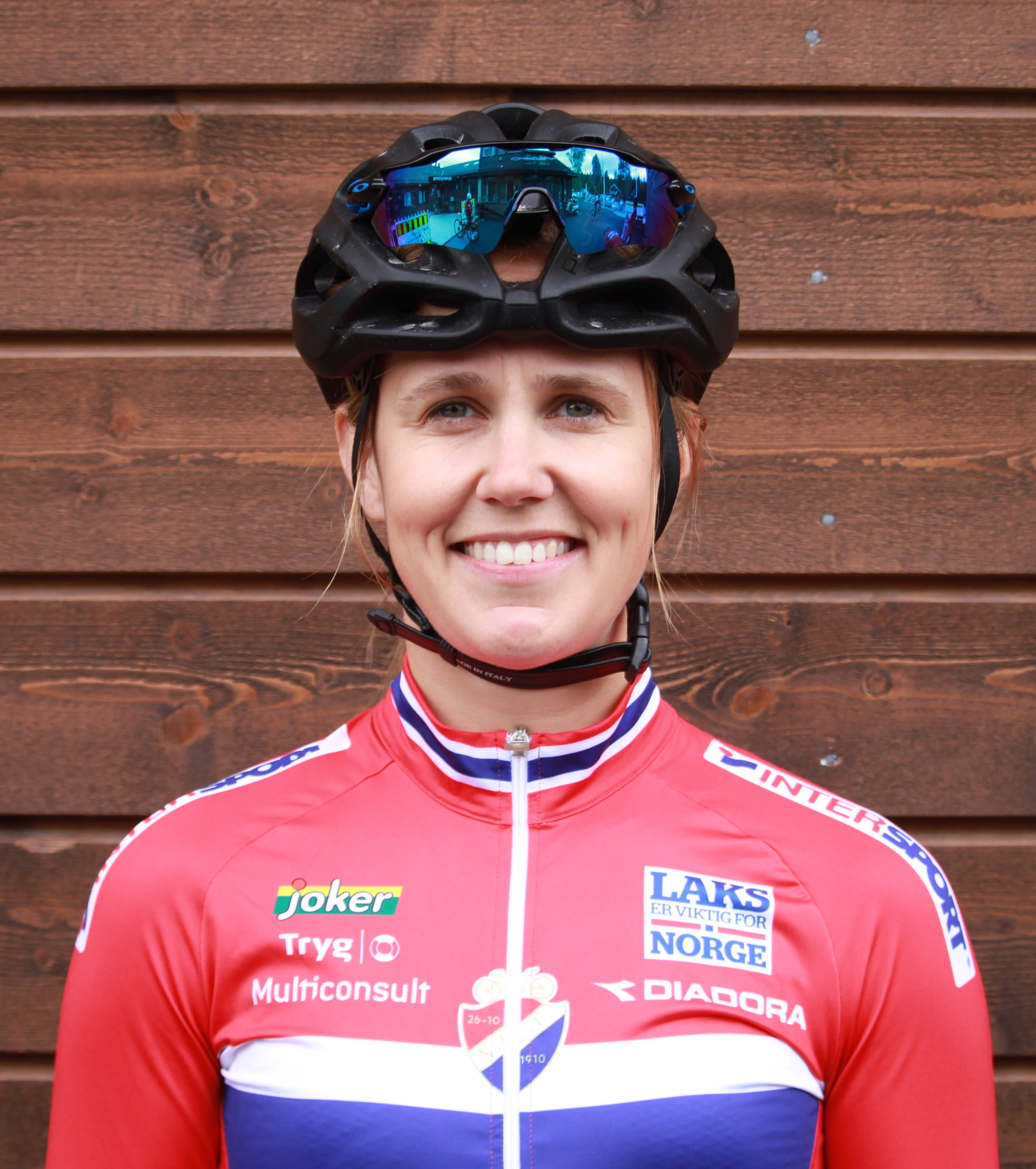
- Moe in 2017.

Personal information
- Full name: Ingrid Moe
- Born: 15 November 1984 (age 41) Bergen, Norway

Cycling career
- Sport: Cycling
- Discipline: Road
- Role: Rider

Amateur team
- 2014–2017: Bergen CK

Professional team
- 2018: Hitec Products–Birk Sport

Ingrid Moe (born 15 November 1984) is a Norwegian racing cyclist, who last rode for UCI Women's Team Hitec Products–Birk Sport. She rode in the women's road race event at the 2017 UCI Road World Championships.
