= Nicole D'Agostin =

Italian cyclist (born 1999)

Personal information
- Full name: Nicole D'Agostin
- Born: 1 February 1999 (age 27)

Cycling career
- Sport: Cycling
- Current team: Eneicat–CMTeam
- Disciplines: Road; Cyclo-cross
- Role: Rider

Professional teams
- 2018: Eurotarget–Bianchi–Vitasana
- 2019: Bizkaia–Durango
- 2020: Aromitalia–Basso Bikes–Vaiano
- 2021–: Eneicat–RBH Global–Martín Villa

Nicole D'Agostin (born 1 February 1999) is an Italian professional racing cyclist, who currently rides for UCI Women's Continental Team Eneicat–CMTeam.

== Major results ==
2016
1st Giro dei Cinque Comuni - San Giorgio di Perlena (Veneto)
1st Bolzano
1st Bibano Cyclo-cross
2nd San Giustino
2nd Monza–Madonna del Ghisallo
2017
1st Monza–Madonna del Ghisallo
1st Assisi
1st Stage 2 Giro della Campania
2nd San Remo
2nd Bolzano Cyclo-cross
3rd Giro dei Cinque Comuni - San Giorgio di Perlena (Veneto)
6th Memorial Franco Basso (Breganze, Vicenza, Veneto)
2018
1st Trofeo Massetani a Corridonia
4th Bolzano Cyclo-cross
5th Trofeo Triveneto
6th Memorial Franco Basso (Breganze, Vicenza, Veneto)
2019
2nd Bizkaikoloreak Klasikoa Zaldibar
2nd Subida a Gorla
2nd Balmasedako Emakumeen Saria
3rd Trofeo Bajo Andarax

2024

1 st monsterrando gravel
2 th european championship
1 st italian gravel championship
2 st europeanchampionship asiago

2025

1st swisse gravel
1st monaco gravel
1st wörthersee gravel
2 th Monsterrando gravel
1 st italian championship
