= Colorado Classic (cycling) =

American cycling race

Race details
- Date: August
- Region: Colorado
- Discipline: Road
- Competition: UCI America Tour (2017–2018) USA Cycling's Pro Road Tour (2019)
- Web site: www.coloradoclassic.com

History
- First edition: 2017
- Editions: 3 (as of 2019)
- First winner: Manuel Senni (ITA) (men); Sara Poidevin (CAN) (women)
- Most recent: Gavin Mannion (USA) (men); Chloé Dygert Owen (USA) (women)

The Colorado Classic was a four-stage cycling race that was first held in 2017. First organized with both men's and women's races, the men's race was discontinued after the 2018 edition; the Classic was held as a women-only event in 2019. The men's version of the race was designated as 2.HC and was part of the UCI America Tour. In 2017, the race was 313 miles (504 km) long and was held in Colorado Springs, Breckenridge, and Denver. In 2018, the first two stages were in Vail (August 16–17) and the last two were in Denver (August 18–19). The Denver stages were accompanied by a music and cycling fan fest extravaganza called Velorama.

In December 2018, the organizers announced that the Classic would become a women-only race from 2019 forward. As part of the change, the women's purse was increased from $20,000 in 2018 to $75,000 for 2019—which was $5,000 more than the purse for the final men's Classic in 2018. The Classic became the only standalone women's stage race in the Western Hemisphere included in the official UCI calendar; the 2019 edition was the first to be part of USA Cycling's Pro Road Tour and is classified as a 2.1 race by the UCI. The race has not been held since 2019; the 2020 edition was canceled due to the COVID-19 pandemic and further races failed to attract a title sponsor.

== Winners - Men ==
Year	Country	Rider	Team
2017	Italy	Manuel Senni	BMC Racing Team
2018	United States	Gavin Mannion	UnitedHealthcare

== Winners - Women ==
Year	Country	Rider	Team
2017	Canada	Sara Poidevin	Rally Cycling
2018	United States	Katie Hall	UnitedHealthcare
2019	United States	Chloé Dygert Owen	Sho-Air Twenty20

== See also ==
- Coors Classic, Colorado cycling race held in 1980–1988
- USA Pro Cycling Challenge, Colorado cycling race held in 2011–2015
