= Summer Moak =

American cyclist

Personal information
- Full name: Summer Moak
- Born: June 3, 1999 (age 27)

Cycling career
- Sport: Cycling
- Current team: LUX Development Cycling Team
- Discipline: Road
- Role: Rider

Amateur team
- 2020: LUX Development Cycling Team

Professional team
- 2018–2019: Rally Cycling

Summer Moak (born June 3, 1999) is an American racing cyclist, who currently rides for American amateur team LUX Development Cycling Team.
