= Peixiao Wu =

Chinese cyclist

Personal information
- Full name: Peixiao Wu
- Born: 27 August 1996 (age 30)

Cycling career
- Sport: Cycling
- Discipline: Road
- Role: Rider

Professional team
- 2018–2020: China Chongming–Liv

Peixiao Wu (born 27 August 1996) is a Chinese professional racing cyclist, who most recently rode for UCI Women's Continental Team China Liv Pro Cycling.
