= Amiliya Iskakova =

Kazakhstani cyclist (born 1995)

Personal information
- Full name: Amiliya Iskakova
- Born: 29 March 1995 (age 31)

Cycling career
- Sport: Cycling
- Discipline: Road
- Role: Rider

Professional team
- 2017–2019: Astana

Amiliya Iskakova (born 29 March 1995) is a Kazakhstani racing cyclist, who last rode for UCI Women's Team Astana. She rode in the women's road race event at the 2018 UCI Road World Championships.
