= Virginópolis =

Brazilian municipality in the state of Minas Gerais

Coordinates: 18°45′S 42°45′W

- Municipality
- Interactive map of Virginópolis
- Country: Brazil
- State: Minas Gerais
- Region: Southeast

Population (2022 Census)
  - Total: 10,314
  - Estimate (2025): 10,511
- Time zone: UTC−3 (BRT)

Virginópolis is a Brazilian municipality in the state of Minas Gerais. As of 2025 its population is estimated to be 10,511. Every year, from the end of October to the beginning of November, the municipality celebrates its Festival of Jabuticaba, a fruit commonly grown in the area.

== See also ==
- List of municipalities in Minas Gerais
