= Sara Bergen =

Canadian cyclist

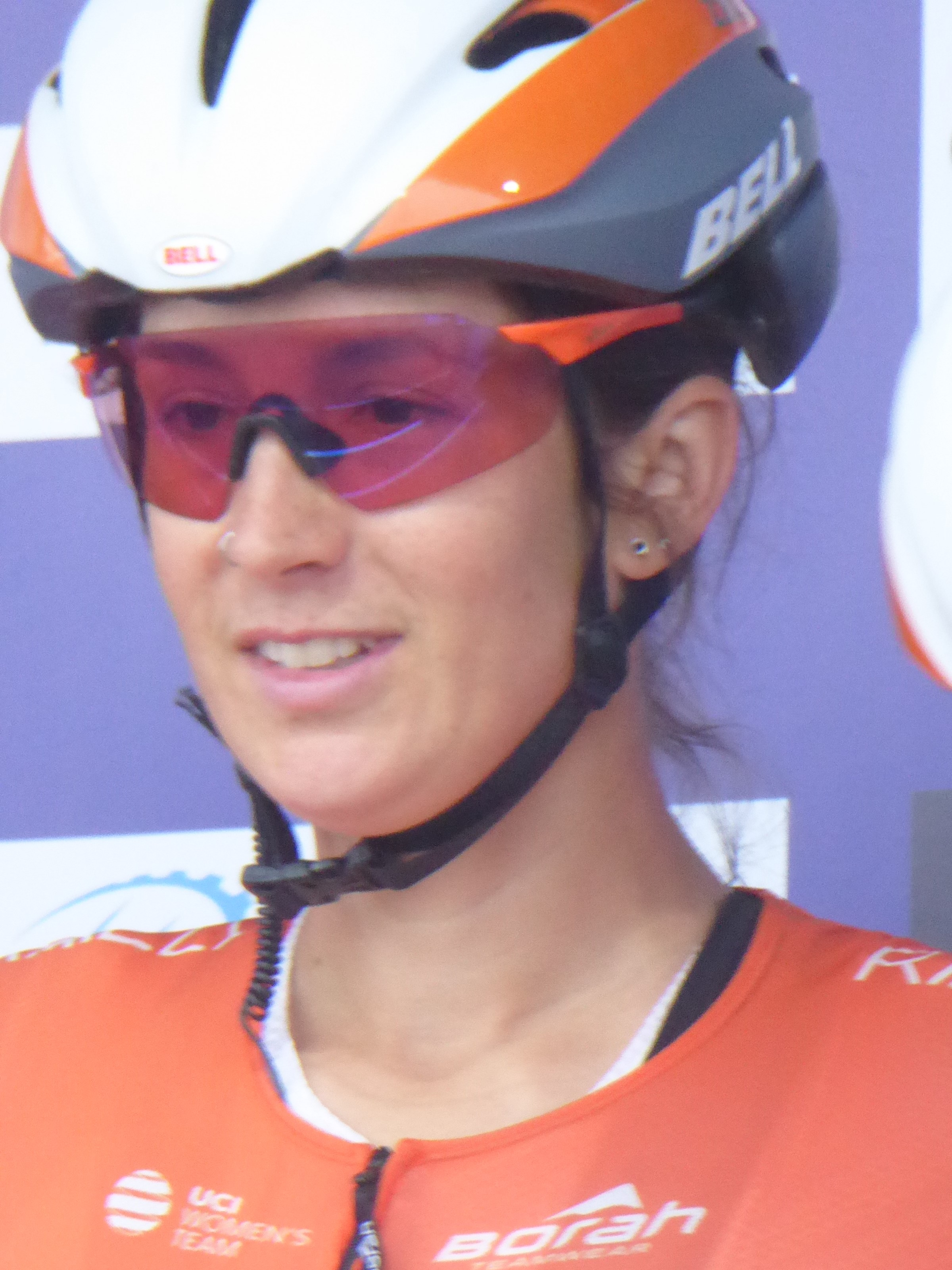
- Bergen at the 2019 Women's Tour of Scotland

Personal information
- Born: 6 December 1988 (age 37) Vancouver, British Columbia
- Height: 5 ft 8 in (173 cm)
- Weight: 140 lb (64 kg)

Cycling career
- Sport: Cycling
- Current team: Retired
- Discipline: Road
- Role: Rider
- Rider type: All-rounder

Amateur team
- 2015–2016: Trek–Red Truck Beer–Mosaic Homes

Professional team
- 2017–2020: Rally Cycling

Major wins
- Provincial Road Race Championships (2015, 2016)

Sara Bergen (born 6 December 1988) is a Canadian former professional racing cyclist, who rode professionally for UCI Women's Continental Team Rally Cycling, between 2017 and 2020. During her career, Bergen took two professional victories – winning a stage at both the 2017 Cascade Cycling Classic and the 2018 Joe Martin Stage Race.

== Career ==
She rode in the women's road race at the 2016 UCI Road World Championships, riding lead out to sprinters Joëlle Numainville and Leah Kirchmann to a record two top 15 finishes, finishing in 91st place. In 2017, she signed with Rally Cycling, leaving Trek–Red Truck Beer–Mosaic Homes. She won the third stage of the Cascade Cycling Classic that year, before going on to win the second stage of the Joe Martin Stage Race in 2018.

== Personal life ==
Outside of cycling, Bergen holds a Bachelor of Technology degree in Architectural Science and a diploma in Architectural and Building Engineering Technology from British Columbia Institute of Technology.
