= Human Powered Health (women's team) =

American cycling team

Team information
- UCI code: HPH
- Registered: United States
- Founded: 2012
- Discipline: Road
- Status: UCI Women's Team (2013–2019); UCI Women's Continental Team (2020–2021); UCI Women's WorldTeam (2022–present)
- Bicycles: Orbea (2012–2013); Diamondback (2014–2018); Felt (2019–2023); Factor (2024–)
- Website: Team home page

Key personnel
- General manager: Jonas Carney
- Team managers: Joanne Kiesanowski; Andrew Bajadali

Team name history
- 2012 2013–2014 2015 2016–2018 2019 2020–2021 2022–: Optum Pro Cycling; Optum p/b Kelly Benefit Strategies; Optum p/b KBS; Rally Cycling; Rally UHC Cycling; Rally Cycling; Human Powered Health
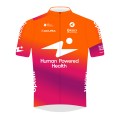
Human Powered Health jersey
Jersey

Human Powered Health (UCI team code: HPH) is a women's professional cycling team founded in 2012 which currently competes in the UCI Women's World Tour. In 2022, Human Powered Health became the first co-educational professional cycling team to promote its women's team to the WorldTour level ahead of its men's program.

The team was founded as Optum-Kelly Benefit Strategies and was initially directed by Rachel Heal. The team's current sports directors are Joanne Kiesanowski and Andrew Bajadali.

The team is sponsored by Human Powered Health, a subsidiary of American healthcare services provider Optum.

== Team roster ==
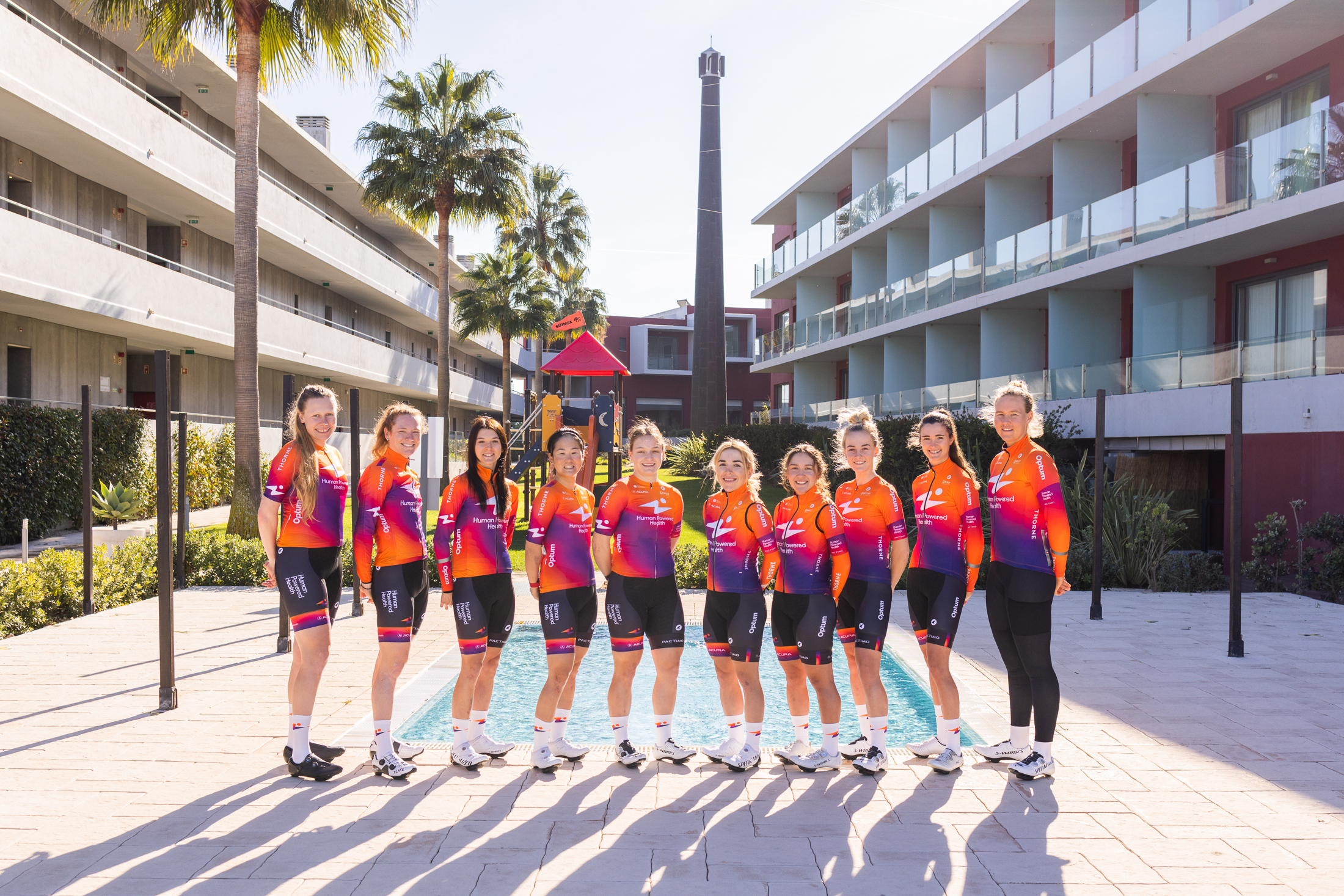
The UCI Women's WorldTour Human Powered Health Women's squad at a pre-season camp in Portugal, 2022.

As of 17 January 2025.

| Rider | Date of birth |
|---|---|
| Yurani Blanco (ESP) | 3 February 1998 (age 28) |
| Giada Borghesi (ITA) | 27 November 2002 (age 23) |
| Carlotta Cipressi (ITA) | 11 June 2003 (age 23) |
| Maggie Coles-Lyster (CAN) | 12 February 1999 (age 27) |
| Thalita de Jong (NED) | 6 November 1993 (age 32) |
| Ruth Edwards (USA) | 3 July 1993 (age 33) |
| Maëlle Grossetête (FRA) | 10 April 1998 (age 28) |
| Romy Kasper (GER) | 5 May 1988 (age 38) |
| Barbara Malcotti (ITA) | 19 February 2000 (age 26) |

| Rider | Date of birth |
|---|---|
| Mona Mitterwallner (AUT) | 9 January 2002 (age 24) |
| Daria Pikulik (POL) | 6 January 1997 (age 29) |
| Wiktoria Pikulik (POL) | 15 June 1998 (age 28) |
| Marit Raaijmakers (NED) | 2 June 1999 (age 27) |
| Katia Ragusa (ITA) | 19 May 1997 (age 29) |
| Kathrin Schweinberger (AUT) | 29 October 1996 (age 29) |
| Lily Williams (USA) | 24 June 1994 (age 32) |
| Silvia Zanardi (ITA) | 3 March 2000 (age 26) |

== Major wins ==
2012
Stage 4 Tour Cycliste Féminin International de l'Ardèche, Joëlle Numainville
2013
Stages 3 & 4 Tour Cycliste Féminin International de l'Ardèche, Joëlle Numainville
2014
Gent–Wevelgem, Lauren Hall
Sprints classification Redlands Bicycle Classic, Leah Kirchmann

Stages 3 & 4, Leah Kirchmann

Teams classification The Women's Tour
Grand Prix cycliste de Gatineau, Denise Ramsden
Young rider classification North Star Grand Prix, Leah Kirchmann

Teams classification

Tour de Delta MK Criterium, Denise Ramsden
Tour de Delta Brenco Criterium, Leah Kirchmann
White Spot / Delta Road Race, Leah Kirchmann
Gastown Grand Prix, (NCC), Leah Kirchmann
Overall Tour de Feminin-O cenu Českého Švýcarska, Brianna Walle

Sprints classification, Brianna Walle
Stage 5, Brianna Walle

2015
Stage 2 San Dimas Stage Race, Lex Albrecht
Stage 3 San Dimas Stage Race, Brianna Walle
Stage 2 Joe Martin Stage Race p/b Nature Valley, Leah Kirchmann
Stage 2 Tour of the Gila, Annie Ewart
Stages 2 & 3 Tour of California, Leah Kirchmann
Stage 3 BeNe Ladies Tour, Alison Tetrick
Pan American Games Road Race, Jasmin Glaesser
2016
Stage 2 Tour of the Gila, Jasmin Glaesser
Stage 4 Tour of the Gila, Heather Fischer
2017
Stage 4 Tour of the Gila, Emma White
Mountains classification Cascade Cycling Classic, Sara Poidevin

Young rider classification, Sara Poidevin
Stages 1 & 5, Kirsti Lay
Stage 3, Sara Bergen

Overall Colorado Classic, Sara Poidevin

Points classification, Sara Poidevin
Mountains classification, Sara Poidevin
Young rider classification, Sara Poidevin
Stage 2, Sara Poidevin

2018
Stage 1 Chico Stage Race, Summer Moak
Points classification Joe Martin Stage Race, Sara Bergen

Stage 2, Sara Bergen

Stage 4 Tour of the Gila, Emma White
Sprints classification Tour of California, Emma White

Young rider classification, Sara Poidevin

Young rider classification Tour Cycliste Féminin International de l'Ardèche, Sara Poidevin
2019
Stage 2 Tour of the Gila, Heidi Franz
2020
Stage 1 Tour Down Under, Chloe Hosking
2023
Stage 1 Tour Down Under, Daria Pikulik
Aphrodite Cycling Race ITT, Antri Christoforou

== National champions ==
2012
Canada Road Race, Denise Ramsden
2013
New Zealand Road Race, Courteney Lowe
USA Road Race, Jade Wilcoxson
Canada Time Trial, Joëlle Numainville
Canada Road Race, Joëlle Numainville
2014
Canada Time Trial, Leah Kirchmann
Canada Road Race, Leah Kirchmann
Canada Criterium, Leah Kirchmann
2015
Canada Track (Team pursuit), Jasmin Glaesser
Canada Track (Individual pursuit), Jasmin Glaesser
Canada Track (Omnium), Jasmin Glaesser
USA TTT (Note: The riders on the squad were Brianna Walle, Jasmin Glaesser, Amy Charity, Annie Ewart, Leah Kirchmann and Alison Tetrick.)
2017
World Track (Team pursuit), Kelly Catlin
Canada Road Race, Allison Beveridge
Pan American Track (Individual pursuit), Kelly Catlin
Pan American Track (Madison), Allison Beveridge
Canada Track (Omnium), Allison Beveridge
Canada Track (Team pursuit), Allison Beveridge
Canada Track (Team pursuit), Katherine Maine
Canada Track (Madison), Allison Beveridge
Canada Track (Points race), Allison Beveridge
2018
Canada U23 Time Trial, Sara Poidevin
Canada Road Race, Katherine Maine
Canada U23 Road Race, Katherine Maine
Canada Criterium, Sara Bergen
USA U23 Criterium, Emma White
USA U23 Time Trial, Emma White
USA U23 Road Race, Emma White
Pan American Track (Team Pursuit), Kelly Catlin
Pan American Track (Individual Pursuit), Kelly Catlin
2020
Australia Criterium, Chloe Hosking
2021
New Zealand Track (Scratch race), Olivia Ray
USA U23 Cyclo-cross, Katie Clouse
2022
New Zealand Road Race, Olivia Ray
European Track (Individual Pursuit), Mieke Kröger
Cyprus Time Trial, Antri Christoforou
Cyprus Road Race, Antri Christoforou
Netherlands Track (Madison), Marit Raaijmakers
Netherlands Track (Points race), Marit Raaijmakers
2023
Cyprus Time Trial, Antri Christoforou
