= Sara Poidevin =

Canadian cyclist

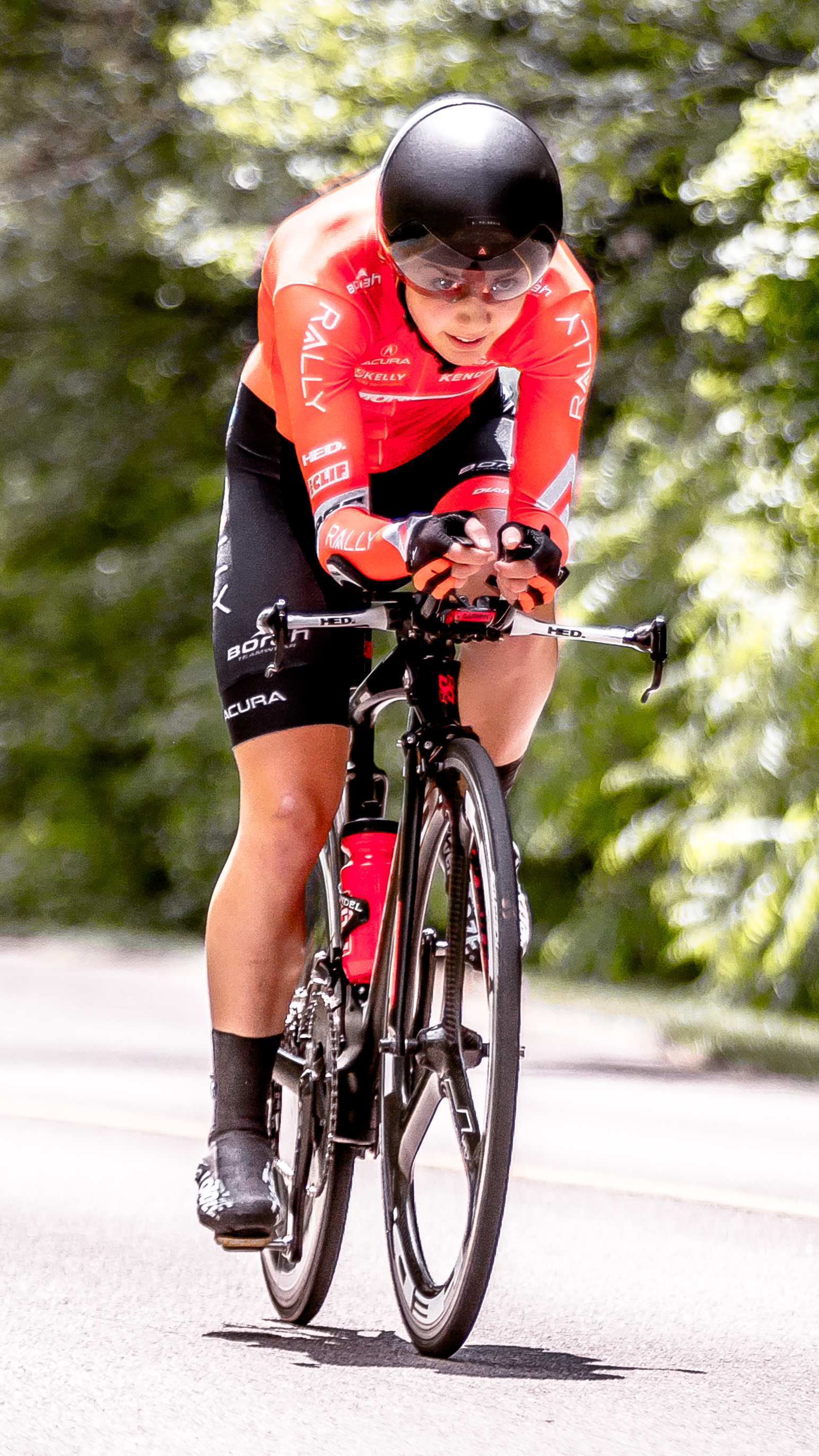
- Poidevin in 2016.

Personal information
- Full name: Sara Poidevin
- Nickname: Poido
- Born: 7 May 1996 (age 30) Canmore, Alberta, Canada
- Height: 5 ft 6 in (168 cm)

Cycling career
- Sport: Cycling
- Current team: DNA Pro Cycling
- Disciplines: Road; Mountain biking
- Role: Rider
- Rider type: All-rounder

Professional teams
- 2016–2021: Rally Cycling
- 2022–2023: EF Education–Tibco–SVB
- 2024–: DNA Pro Cycling

Sara Poidevin (born 7 May 1996) is a Canadian professional racing cyclist, who currently rides for UCI Women's Continental Team DNA Pro Cycling. She initially raced mountain bikes before switching to road racing in 2013.

== Major results ==
2016
1st Young rider classification, Cascade Cycling Classic
1st Mountains classification, Redlands Classic
4th White Spot / Delta Road Race
2017
1st Overall Colorado Classic

1st Points classification
1st Mountains classification
1st Young rider classification
1st Stage 2

2nd Overall Cascade Cycling Classic

1st Mountains classification
1st Young rider classification
1st Stage 5

3rd Road race, National Road Championships
8th Overall Tour Cycliste Féminin International de l'Ardèche
2018
2nd Overall Tour of the Gila

1st Young rider classification

6th Overall Tour Cycliste Féminin International de l'Ardèche

1st Young rider classification

7th Overall Tour of California

1st Young rider classification

2020
7th Overall Tour Cycliste Féminin International de l'Ardèche
10th Trophée des Grimpeuses
2021
3rd Road race, National Road Championships
2022
1st Stage 1a Tour Féminin International des Pyrénées
10th Overall Joe Martin Stage Race
2023
9th Overall Joe Martin Stage Race
