= Heidi Franz =

American cyclist

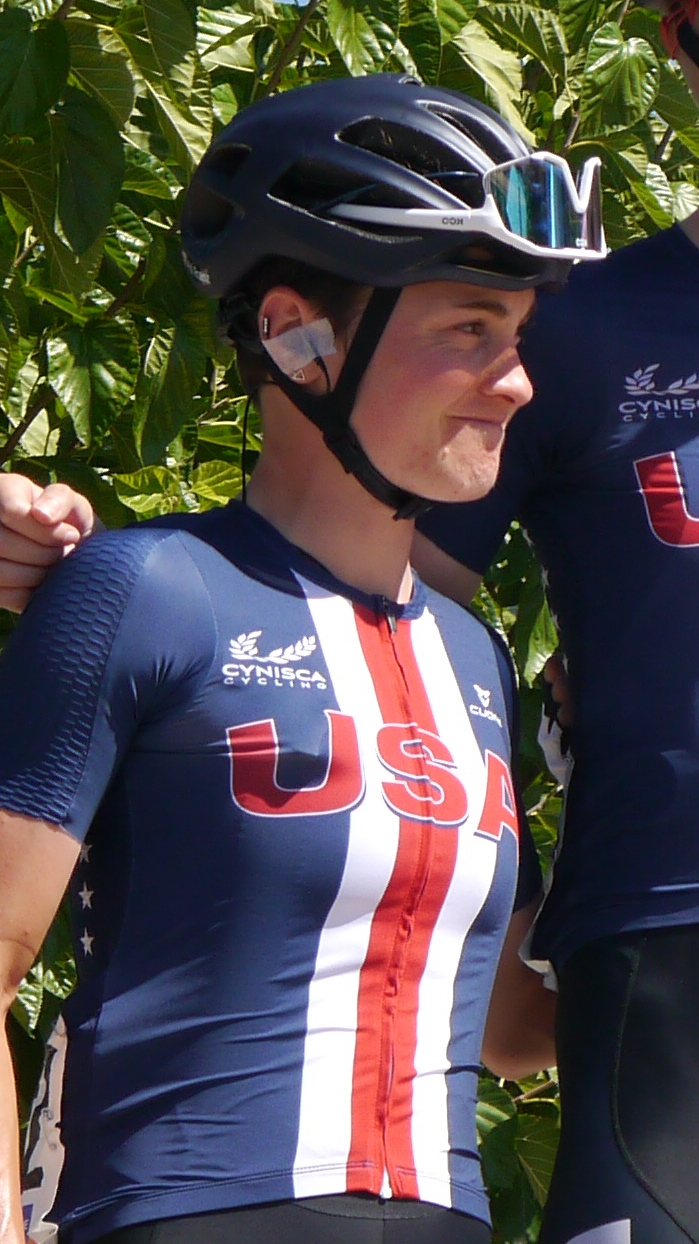
- Heidi Franz in 2022

Personal information
- Full name: Heidi Franz
- Born: January 14, 1995 (age 31) Bainbridge Island, Washington

Cycling career
- Sport: Cycling
- Current team: St. Michel–Preference Home–Auber93
- Discipline: Road
- Role: Rider

Professional teams
- 2018–2021: Rally Cycling
- 2022: InstaFund Racing
- 2023: Zaaf Cycling Team
- 2023: DNA Pro Cycling
- 2024: Lifeplus Wahoo
- 2025: Cynisca Cycling
- 2026: St. Michel–Preference Home–Auber93

Heidi Franz (born January 14, 1995) is an American professional racing cyclist, who currently rides for UCI Women's Continental Team St. Michel–Preference Home–Auber93.

== Major results ==
2019
1st Stage 2 Tour of the Gila
2021
1st Sprints classification Setmana Ciclista Valenciana
2022
Redlands Bicycle Classic

1st Stage 1
2nd Stage 5
1st General classification

Joe Martin Stage Race

1st Stage 2
1st Points classification
2nd General classification

2023
1st Egmont Cycling Race
