= Ingrid Lorvik =

Norwegian cyclist

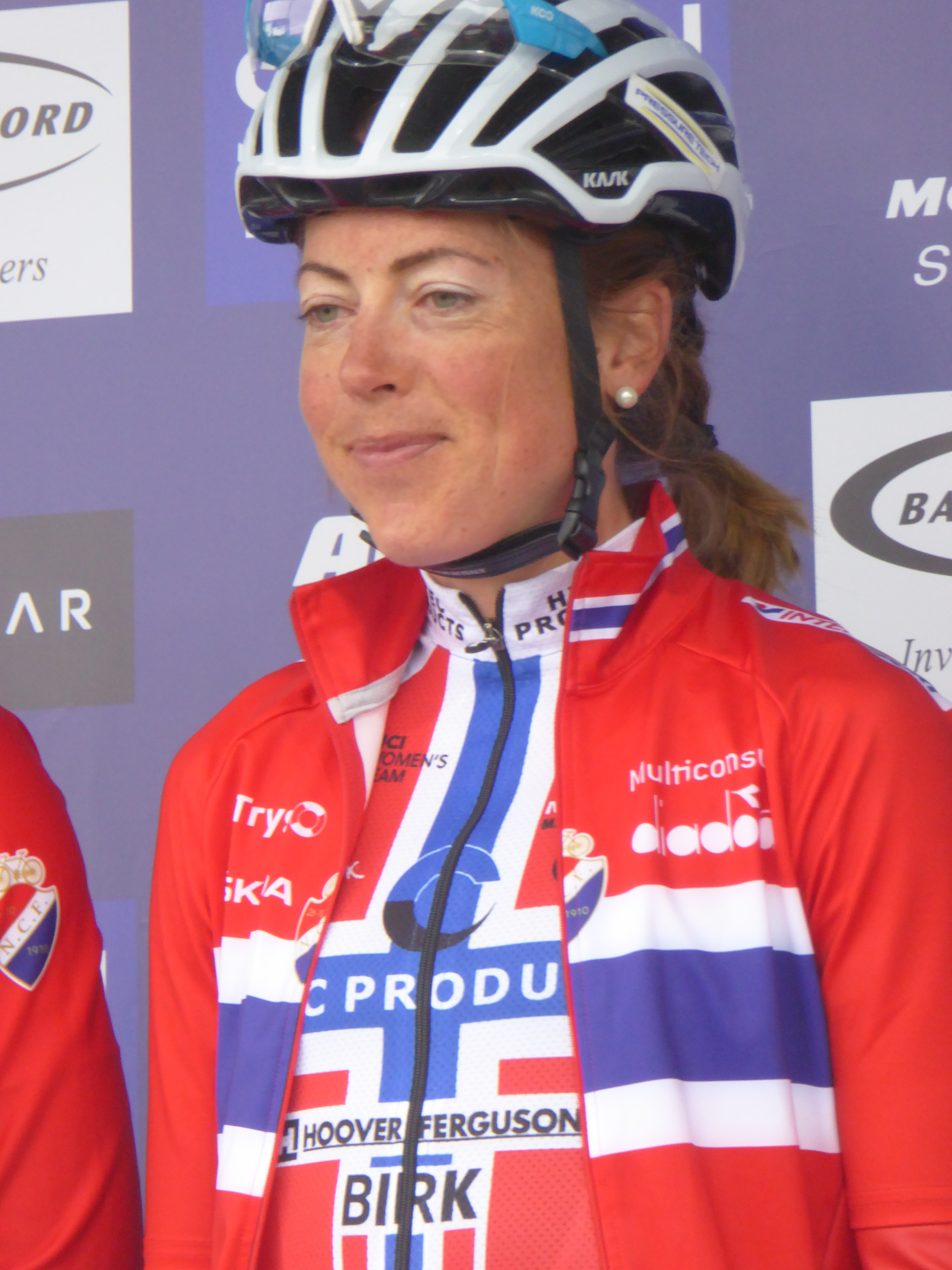
- Lorvik at the 2019 Women's Tour of Scotland

Personal information
- Full name: Ingrid Lorvik
- Born: 21 February 1986 (age 40)

Cycling career
- Sport: Cycling
- Discipline: Road
- Role: Rider

Amateur teams
- 2014: CK Victoria
- 2017: CK Victoria

Professional teams
- 2015–2016: Team Hitec Products
- 2018–2020: Hitec Products–Birk Sport

Ingrid Lorvik (born 21 February 1986) is a Norwegian racing cyclist, who most recently rode for UCI Women's Continental Team Hitec Products–Birk Sport.

During her career, Lorvik has taken three professional victories – a stage at both the 2014 Tour de Feminin – O cenu Českého Švýcarska and the 2015 Gracia–Orlová, as well as the 2019 Norwegian National Road Race Championships. She has also contested the women's road race at the UCI Road World Championships on four occasions between 2013 and 2020.

== Major results ==
2014
3rd Road race, National Road Championships
5th Overall Tour de Feminin – O cenu Českého Švýcarska

1st Stage 1

2015
3rd Road race, National Road Championships
6th Overall Gracia–Orlová

1st Stage 2

2017
3rd Road race, National Road Championships
2018
8th Overall The Princess Maha Chackri Sirindhorn's Cup "Women's Tour of Thailand"
2019
1st Road race, National Road Championships
5th Overall Vuelta a Burgos Feminas
2020
8th Overall Dubai Women's Tour
