= 2018 Women's Herald Sun Tour =

Race details
- Dates: 30–31 January 2018
- Stages: 2
- Distance: 125.1 km (77.7 mi)
- Winning time: 3h 22' 16"

Results
Jersey awarded to the overall winner	Winner	Brodie Chapman (AUS)	(Australia (national team))
	Second	Annemiek van Vleuten (NED)	(Mitchelton–Scott)
	Third	Chloe Hosking (AUS)	(Alé–Cipollini)
Jersey awarded to the mountains classification winner	Mountains	Brodie Chapman (AUS)	(Australia (national team))
Jersey awarded to the young rider classification winner	Young rider	Jeanne Korevaar (NED)	(WaowDeals Pro Cycling)
Jersey awarded to the sprints classification winner	Sprints	Chloe Hosking (AUS)	(Alé–Cipollini)
	Team	Australia (national team)	

The 2018 Women's Herald Sun Tour presented by Let's Go Motorhomes was a women's cycle stage race held in Australia from 30 to 31 January 2018. The 2018 edition was the inaugural edition of the race.

The race was won by Brodie Chapman, riding for an Australian national team. Chapman soloed to victory in the opening stage, before maintaining her lead in the following day's time trial, won by world champion Annemiek van Vleuten (Mitchelton–Scott). Van Vleuten finished second overall, five seconds down on Chapman, while the podium was completed by Chloe Hosking, 63 seconds behind for the Alé–Cipollini team. Chapman won the mountains classification, Hosking was the winner of the sprints classification, while the Australian national team won the teams classification. Jeanne Korevaar of WaowDeals Pro Cycling won the other jersey, the white jersey, as winner of the young rider classification for under-23 riders.

== Teams ==
16 teams participated in the 2018 Women's Herald Sun Tour.

UCI Women's Teams

- Alé–Cipollini
- Bepink
- Cylance Pro Cycling
- Mitchelton–Scott
- Tibco–Silicon Valley Bank
- Trek–Drops
- Twenty20 p/b Sho-Air
- Team Virtu Cycling
- WaowDeals Pro Cycling
- Wiggle High5

Other teams

- Australia (national team)
- Mike Greer Homes Women's Cycling Team
- New Zealand (national team)
- Rush Women's Team
- Specialized Women's Racing
- Sydney Uni–Staminade

== Route ==
The race route was announced on 6 December 2017.

List of stages
Stage	Date	Course	Distance	Type	Winner
1	30 January	Healesville to Healesville	123.5 km (76.7 mi)	Hilly stage	Brodie Chapman (AUS)
2	31 January	Alexandra Gardens to Southbank	1.6 km (1.0 mi)	Individual time trial	Annemiek van Vleuten (NED)

== Stages ==
=== Stage 1 ===
30 January 2018 — Healesville to Healesville, 123.5 km (76.7 mi)

Result of Stage 1
Rank	Rider	Team	Time
1	Brodie Chapman (AUS)	Australia (national team)	3h 20' 10"
2	Annemiek van Vleuten (NED)	Mitchelton–Scott	+ 8"
3	Chloe Hosking (AUS)	Alé–Cipollini	+ 1' 02"
4	Katrin Garfoot (AUS)	Australia (national team)	+ 1' 02"
5	Giorgia Bronzini (ITA)	Cylance Pro Cycling	+ 1' 02"
6	Anouska Koster (NED)	WaowDeals Pro Cycling	+ 1' 02"
7	Tiffany Cromwell (AUS)	Australia (national team)	+ 1' 02"
8	Eva Buurman (NED)	Trek–Drops	+ 1' 02"
9	Alison Jackson (CAN)	Tibco–Silicon Valley Bank	+ 1' 02"
10	Shannon Malseed (AUS)	Tibco–Silicon Valley Bank	+ 1' 02"

General classification after Stage 1
Rank	Rider	Team	Time
1	Brodie Chapman (AUS)	Australia (national team)	3h 20' 00"
2	Annemiek van Vleuten (NED)	Mitchelton–Scott	+ 12"
3	Chloe Hosking (AUS)	Alé–Cipollini	+ 1' 03"
4	Alison Jackson (CAN)	Tibco–Silicon Valley Bank	+ 1' 11"
5	Justine Barrow (AUS)	Rush Women's Team	+ 1' 12"
6	Katrin Garfoot (AUS)	Australia (national team)	+ 1' 12"
7	Rachel Neylan (AUS)	Australia (national team)	+ 1' 12"
8	Tiffany Cromwell (AUS)	Australia (national team)	+ 1' 12"
9	Grace Anderson (NZL)	New Zealand (national team)	+ 1' 12"
10	Jeanne Korevaar (NED)	WaowDeals Pro Cycling	+ 1' 12"

=== Stage 2 ===
31 January 2018 — Alexandra Gardens to Southbank, 1.6 km (1.0 mi), individual time trial (ITT)

Result of Stage 2
Rank	Rider	Team	Time
1	Annemiek van Vleuten (NED)	Mitchelton–Scott	2' 09"
2	Katrin Garfoot (AUS)	Australia (national team)	+ 2"
3	Georgia Williams (NZL)	Mitchelton–Scott	+ 2"
4	Marlies Mejías (CUB)	Tibco–Silicon Valley Bank	+ 4"
5	Tiffany Cromwell (AUS)	Australia (national team)	+ 4"
6	Anouska Koster (NED)	WaowDeals Pro Cycling	+ 4"
7	Annette Edmondson (AUS)	Wiggle High5	+ 4"
8	Grace Brown (AUS)	Rush Women's Team	+ 4"
9	Kate McIlroy (NZL)	Specialized Women's Racing	+ 6"
10	Rachele Barbieri (ITA)	Wiggle High5	+ 6"

Final general classification
Rank	Rider	Team	Time
1	Brodie Chapman (AUS)	Australia (national team)	3h 22' 16"
2	Annemiek van Vleuten (NED)	Mitchelton–Scott	+ 5"
3	Chloe Hosking (AUS)	Alé–Cipollini	+ 1' 03"
4	Katrin Garfoot (AUS)	Australia (national team)	+ 1' 07"
5	Georgia Williams (NZL)	Mitchelton–Scott	+ 1' 07"
6	Anouska Koster (NED)	WaowDeals Pro Cycling	+ 1' 09"
7	Tiffany Cromwell (AUS)	Australia (national team)	+ 1' 09"
8	Alison Jackson (CAN)	Tibco–Silicon Valley Bank	+ 1' 10"
9	Grace Brown (AUS)	Rush Women's Team	+ 1' 10"
10	Linda Villumsen (NZL)	Team Virtu Cycling	+ 1' 11"

== Classification leadership table ==
Stage	Winner	General classification	Sprint classification	Mountains classification	Young rider classification	Most competitive rider	Team classification
1	Brodie Chapman	Brodie Chapman	Chloe Hosking	Brodie Chapman	Grace Anderson	Brodie Chapman	Australia (national team)
2	Annemiek van Vleuten	Brodie Chapman	Chloe Hosking	Brodie Chapman	Jeanne Korevaar	Not awarded	Australia (national team)
Final		Brodie Chapman	Chloe Hosking	Brodie Chapman	Jeanne Korevaar	No final award	Australia (national team)
