= 2018 in women's road cycling =

2018 in women's road cycling is about the 2018 women's bicycle races ruled by the UCI and the 2018 UCI Women's Teams.

== World Championships ==
The World Road Championships is set to be held in Innsbruck, Austria.

	Race	Winner	Second	Third
World Road Championships	Team Time Trial	Canyon//SRAM	Boels–Dolmans	Team Sunweb
World Road Championships	Individual Time Trial	Annemiek van Vleuten (NED)	Anna van der Breggen (NED)	Ellen van Dijk (NED)
World Road Championships	Road Race	Anna van der Breggen (NED)	Amanda Spratt (AUS)	Tatiana Guderzo (ITA)

== Single day races (1.1 and 1.2) ==
Race	Date	Cat. †	Winner	Second	Third
(Australia) Cadel Evans Great Ocean Road Race	January 27	1.1	Chloe Hosking (AUS)	Gracie Elvin (AUS)	Giorgia Bronzini (ITA)
(Belgium) Omloop Het Nieuwsblad	February 24	1.1	Christina Siggaard (DEN)	Alexis Ryan (USA)	Maria Giulia Confalonieri (ITA)
(Belgium) Omloop van het Hageland	February 25	1.1	Ellen van Dijk (NED)	Chloe Hosking (AUS)	Jolien D'Hoore (BEL)
(Belgium) Le Samyn des Dames	February 27	1.2	Janneke Ensing (NED)	Floortje Mackaij (NED)	Lauren Kitchen (AUS)
(Belgium) Omloop van de Westhoek	March 4	1.2	Floortje Mackaij (NED)	Lorena Wiebes (NED)	Marjolein van 't Geloof (NED)
(Netherlands) Acht van Westerveld	March 9	1.2	Alexis Ryan (USA)	Jolien D'Hoore (BEL)	Chloe Hosking (AUS)
(Belgium) Dwars door Vlaanderen	March 28	1.1	Ellen van Dijk (NED)	Amy Pieters (NED)	Floortje Mackaij (NED)
(Belgium) Grand Prix de Dottignies	April 2	1.2	Marta Bastianelli (ITA)	Elisa Balsamo (ITA)	Pascale Jeuland (FRA)
(Belgium) Brabantse Pijl Dames Gooik	April 11	1.1	Marta Bastianelli (ITA)	Leah Kirchmann (CAN)	Marianne Vos (NED)
(Netherlands) EPZ Omloop van Borsele	April 21	1.1	Elisa Balsamo (ITA)	Lorena Wiebes (NED)	Evy Kuijpers (NED)
(Italy) GP della Liberazione	April 25	1.2	Letizia Paternoster (ITA)	Maria Giulia Confalonieri (ITA)	Rasa Leleivytė (LTU)
(South Africa) 100 Cycle Challenge	May 6	1.2	Kimberley Le Court (MRI)	Maroesjka Matthee (RSA)	Joanna Van de Winkel (RSA)
(Belgium) Trofee Maarten Wynants	May 6	1.1	Marta Bastianelli (ITA)	Monique van de Ree (NED)	Lorena Wiebes (NED)
(Spain) Durango-Durango Emakumeen Saria	May 15	1.2	Anna van der Breggen (NED)	Annemiek van Vleuten (NED)	Sabrina Stultiens (NED)
(France) La Classique Morbihan	May 25	1.1	Ashleigh Moolman (RSA)	Rasa Leleivytė (LIT)	Alicia González (ESP)
(France) Grand Prix de Plumelec-Morbihan Dames	May 26	1.1	Ashleigh Moolman (RSA)	Małgorzata Jasińska (POL)	Ane Santesteban (ESP)
(Switzerland) SwissEver GP Cham-Hagendorn	May 27	1.2	Amanda Spratt (AUS)	Arianna Fidanza (ITA)	Desiree Ehrler (SUI)
(Belgium) Gooik–Geraardsbergen–Gooik	May 27	1.1	Sarah Roy (AUS)	Gracie Elvin (AUS)	Elisa Balsamo (ITA)
(United States) Winston-Salem Cycling Classic	May 28	1.2	Lily Williams (USA)	Arlenis Sierra (CUB)	Diana Penuela (COL)
(Ukraine) Horizon Park Women Challenge	June 2	1.2	Yevgenia Vysotska (UKR)	Olga Shekel (UKR)	Lucie Hochmann (CZE)
(Netherlands) Salverda Omloop van de IJsseldelta	June 2	1.2	Lorena Wiebes (NED)	Sarah Roy (AUS)	Annelies Dom (BEL)
(Ukraine) VR Women ITT	June 3	1.2	Antri Christoforou (CYP)	Valeriya Kononenko (UKR)	Olga Shekel (UKR)
(Belgium) Dwars door de Westhoek	June 3	1.1	Thi That Nguyen (VIE)	Lorena Wiebes (NED)	Elisa Balsamo (ITA)
(Canada) Grand Prix Cycliste de Gatineau	June 7	1.1	Lauren Hall (USA)	Alison Jackson (CAN)	Sara Bergen (CAN)
(Canada) Chrono Gatineau	June 8	1.1	Amber Neben (USA)	Karol-Ann Canuel (CAN)	Tayler Wiles (USA)
(Slovenia) Ljubljana–Domžale–Ljubljana TT	June 8	1.2	Olga Zabelinskaya (RUS)	Hayley Simmonds (GBR)	Eugenia Bujak (SLO)
(Belgium) Diamond Tour	June 10	1.1	Janine Van Der Meer (NED)	Kathrin Schweinberger (AUT)	Chiara Consonni (ITA)
(Canada) White Spot / Delta Road Race	July 8	1.2	Kendall Ryan (USA)	Lily Williams (USA)	Kirsti Lay (CAN)
(Belgium) GP Sofie Goos	July 8	1.2	Lorena Wiebes (NED)	Janine Van Der Meer (NED)	Thi That Nguyen (VIE)
(United States) Chrono Kristin Armstrong	July 13	1.2	Amber Neben (USA)	Chloé Dygert (USA)	Jasmin Duehring (CAN)
(France) Tour de Belle Isle en Terre–Kreiz Breizh Elites Dames	July 26	1.2	Dani Christmas (GBR)	Maëlle Grossetête (FRA)	Sofie De Vuyst (BEL)
(Belgium) Erondegemse Pijl	August 4	1.2	Nina Kessler (NED)	Evy Kuijpers (NED)	Monique van de Ree (NED)
(Belgium) Flanders Ladies Classic	August 18	1.2	Séverine Eraud (FRA)	Fien Delbaere (BEL)	Lorena Wiebes (NED)
(Netherlands) Veenendaal Veenendaal Classic	August 22	1.1	Annemiek van Vleuten (NED)	Małgorzata Jasinska (POL)	Lorena Wiebes (NED)
(France) Chrono Champenois	September 9	1.1	Leah Thomas (USA)	Olga Zabelinskaya (UZB)	Hayley Simmonds (GBR)
(France) Grand Prix International d'Isbergues–Pas de Calais Feminin	September 23	1.2	Lauren Kitchen (AUS)	Roxane Fournier (FRA)	Pascale Jeuland-Tranchant (FRA)
(Italy) Giro dell'Emilia Internazionale Donne Elite	October 6	1.1	Rasa Leleivytė (LTU)	Arlenis Sierra (CUB)	Cecilie Uttrup Ludwig (DEN)
(Italy) Gran Premio Bruno Beghelli Internazionale Donne Elite	October 7	1.1	Elisa Balsamo (ITA)	Marta Bastianelli (ITA)	Lorena Wiebes (NED)
(France) Chrono des Nations	October 14	1.1	Olga Zabelinskaya (UZB)	Emma Cecilie Norsgaard (DEN)	Audrey Cordon-Ragot (FRA)
(Costa Rica) Gran Premio ICODER	October 29	1.2	Maria José Vargas (CRC)	Jennifer Cesar (VEN)	Marcela Prieto (MEX)
(Costa Rica) Gran Premio Comite Olimpico Nacional Femenino	October 30	1.2	Marcela Prieto (MEX)	Blanca Liliana Moreno (COL)	Brenda Andrea Santoyo (MEX)
(Eritrea) Africa Cup TTT	November 21	1.2	Eritrea	Ethiopia	South Africa
(Eritrea) Africa Cup ITT	November 22	1.2	Adiam Tesfalem (ERI)	Miheret Asgele (ETH)	Liezel Jordaan (RSA)
(Eritrea) Africa Cup Road Race	November 25	1.1	Maroesjka Matthee (RSA)	Ese Lovina Ukpeseraye (NIG)	Tsega Beyene (ETH)

† The clock symbol denotes a race which takes the form of a one-day time trial.

=== Cancelled events ===
- Independence Cycling Classic

== Stage races (2.1 and 2.2) ==
Race	Date	Cat.	Winner	Second	Third
(Australia) Santos Women's Tour	January 11–14	2.1	Amanda Spratt (AUS)	Lauren Stephens (USA)	Katrin Garfoot (AUS)
(Australia) Women's Herald Sun Tour	January 31–February 1	2.2	Brodie Chapman (AUS)	Annemiek van Vleuten (NED)	Chloe Hosking (AUS)
(Turkey) Tour of Eftalia Hotels & Velo Alanya	January 15–17	2.2	Olga Zabelinskaya (RUS)	Maria Novolodskaya (RUS)	Hanna Solovey (UKR)
(Spain) Setmana Ciclista Valenciana	February 22–25	2.2	Hannah Barnes (GBR)	Ashleigh Moolman (RSA)	Alicia González Blanco (ESP)
(Netherlands) Healthy Ageing Tour	April 4–8	2.1	Amy Pieters (NED)	Chantal Blaak (NED)	Christine Majerus (LUX)
(Thailand) The Princess Maha Chackri Sirindhon's Cup	April 8–10	2.1	Olga Zabelinskaya (RUS)	Karina Kasenova (RUS)	Gulnaz Badykova (RUS)
(United States) Joe Martin Stage Race	April 12–15	2.2	Katie Hall (USA)	Sara Bergen (CAN)	Leah Thomas (USA)
(United States) Tour of the Gila	April 18–22	2.2	Katie Hall (USA)	Sara Poidevin (CAN)	Leah Thomas (USA)
(Czech Republic) Gracia–Orlová	April 26–29	2.2	Emilia Fahlin (SWE)	Olga Zabelinskaya (RUS)	Alexis Ryan (USA)
(Luxembourg) Festival Luxembourgeois du cyclisme féminin Elsy Jacobs	April 27–29	2.1	Letizia Paternoster (ITA)	Christine Majerus (LUX)	Gulnaz Badykova (RUS)
(China) Tour of Zhoushan Island	May 1–3	2.2	Sheyla Gutiérrez (ESP)	Charlotte Becker (GER)	Yelyzaveta Oshurkova (RUS)
(United Kingdom) Tour de Yorkshire	May 4–5	2.1	Megan Guarnier (USA)	Danielle Rowe (GBR)	Alena Amialiusik (BLR)
(China) Panorama Guizhou International Women's Road Cycling Race	May 6–10	2.2	Sheyla Gutiérrez (ESP)	Daniela Gass (GER)	Hanna Tserakh (BEL)
(Sweden) Tour of Uppsala	May 10–11	2.2	Ida Erngren (SWE)	Kathrin Schweinberger (AUT)	Sara Mustonen (SWE)
(Germany) Internationale Thüringen Rundfahrt der Frauen	May 28–June 3	2.1	Lisa Brennauer (GER)	Ellen van Dijk (NED)	Lucinda Brand (NED)
(Czech Republic) Tour de Feminin-O cenu Českého Švýcarska	July 5–8	2.2	Leah Thomas (USA)	Yelyzaveta Oshurkova (RUS)	Sofie De Vuyst (BEL)
(Netherlands) BeNe Ladies Tour	July 19–22	2.1	Marianne Vos (NED)	Lisa Klein (GER)	Katie Archibald (GBR)
Vuelta Femenina a Guatemala	August 5–7	2.1	Marcela Prieto (MEX)	Flávia Oliveira (BRA)	Gabriela Soto Lopez (GUA)
Lotto Belisol Belgium Tour	September 4–7	2.1	Liane Lippert (GER)	Aude Biannic (FRA)	Lotte Kopecky (BEL)
(France) Tour Cycliste Féminin International de l'Ardèche	September 5–10	2.1	Katarzyna Niewiadoma (POL)	Margarita Victoria Garcia (ESP)	Eider Merino (ESP)
(Italy) Giro della Toscana	September 7–9	2.2	Soraya Paladin (ITA)	Maria Giulia Confalonieri (ITA)	Tetyana Ryabchenko (UKR)
(Costa Rica) Gran Premio Comite Olimpico Nacional Femenino	October 29–30	2.2	Marcela Prieto (MEX)	Blanca Liliana Moreno (COL)	Brenda Andrea Santoyo (MEX)
Vuelta Internacional Femenina a Costa Rica	November 2–4	2.2	Blanca Liliana Moreno (COL)	Marcela Prieto (MEX)	Maria José Vargas (CRC)

=== Cancelled events ===
- La Route de France
- Trophée d'Or Féminin
- Tour of Dongting Lake International Women's Road Cycling Race

== Criteriums (CRT) ==
Race	Date	Cat.	Winner	Second	Third
(Australia) Cadel Evans Great Ocean Road Race – Towards Zero Race Melbourne	January 25	CRT	Annette Edmondson (AUS)	Giorgia Bronzini (ITA)	Kendall Ryan (USA)
(Netherlands) Profronde van Made	April 21	CRT			
(United States) Winston Salem Cycling Classic	May 26	CRT			
(Canada) Global Relay Gastown Grand Prix	July 11	CRT			
(Netherlands) Daags na de Tour	July 30	CRT			
(Netherlands) Profronde van Surhuisterveen	July 31	CRT			
(Netherlands) Acht van Chaam	August 1	CRT			
(Netherlands) RaboRonde Heerlen	August 3	CRT			
(Netherlands) Cityronde van Tiel	August 5	CRT			
(Netherlands) Draai van de Kaai	August 6	CRT			
(Netherlands) Profronde van Oostvoorne	August 9	CRT			
(Netherlands) Gouden Pijl	August 14	CRT			
(Netherlands) Profronde Etten-Leur	August 19	CRT			
(Poland) Memoriał im Stanisława Szozdy	September 9	CRT			

== Championships ==
=== International Games ===
Championships	Race	Winner	Second	Third
Commonwealth Games; Australia	Road race	Chloe Hosking (AUS)	Georgia Williams (NZL)	Danielle Rowe (WAL)
Commonwealth Games; Australia	Time trial	Katrin Garfoot (AUS)	Linda Villumsen (NZL)	Hayley Simmonds (ENG)
Mediterranean Games; Spain	Road race	Elisa Longo Borghini (ITA)	Ane Santesteban (ESP)	Erica Magnaldi (ITA)
Mediterranean Games; Spain	Time trial	Elena Cecchini (ITA)	Lisa Morzenti (ITA)	Antri Christoforou (CYP)
Central American and Caribbean Games; Colombia	Road race	Teneil Campbell (TTO)	Yudelmis Domínguez (CUB)	Lizbeth Salazar (MEX)
Central American and Caribbean Games; Colombia	Time trial	Arlenis Sierra (CUB)	Ana Sanabria (COL)	Sérika Gulumá (COL)
Asian Games; Malaysia	Road race	Na Ah-reum (KOR)	Pu Yixian (CHN)	Eri Yonamine (JPN)
Asian Games; Malaysia	Time trial	Na Ah-reum (KOR)	Eri Yonamine (JPN)	Leung Wing Yee (HKG)

=== Continental Championships ===
Championships	Race	Winner	Second	Third
African Continental Championships; Rwanda	Road race	Bisrat Ghebremesk (ERI)	Tsega Beyene (ETH)	Mossana Debesay (ERI)
African Continental Championships; Rwanda	Junior Road race	Desiet Kidane (ERI)	Furtuna Kasahun (ETH)	Zayid Hailu (ETH)
African Continental Championships; Rwanda	Individual time trial	Mossana Debesay (ERI)	Selam Amha (ETH)	Eyeru Tesfoam Gebru (ETH)
African Continental Championships; Rwanda	Junior Individual time trial	Desiet Kidane (ERI)	Kasahun Tsadkan Gebremedhn (ETH)	Zayid Hailu (ETH)
African Continental Championships; Rwanda	Team time trial	Ethiopia	Eritrea	Rwanda
African Continental Championships; Rwanda	Junior Team time trial	Rwanda	Burundi	
Oceania Cycling Championships; Tasmania	Road race	Sharlotte Lucas (NZL)	Grace Brown (AUS)	Justine Barrow (AUS)
Oceania Cycling Championships; Tasmania	U23 Road race	Mikayla Harvey (NZL)	Grace Anderson (NZL)	Georgia Catterick (NZL)
Oceania Cycling Championships; Tasmania	Junior Road race	Sarah Gigante (AUS)	Jenna Merrick (NZL)	Connie O'Brien (NZL)
Oceania Cycling Championships; Tasmania	Individual time trial	Grace Brown (AUS)	Kate Perry (AUS)	Sharlotte Lucas (NZL)
Oceania Cycling Championships; Tasmania	U23 Individual time trial	Mikayla Harvey (NZL)	Libby Arbuckle (NZL)	Maeve Moroney-Plouffe (AUS)
Oceania Cycling Championships; Tasmania	Junior Individual time trial	Anya Louw (AUS)	Phoebe Young (NZL)	Sarah Gigante (AUS)
Pan American Championships; Argentina	Road race	Arlenis Sierra (CUB)	Iraida Garcia (CUB)	Marlies Mejías (CUB)
Pan American Championships; Argentina	Individual time trial	Amber Neben (USA)	Lauren Stephens (USA)	Ana Sanabria (COL)
Asian Cycling Championships; Myanmar (2018 summary)	Road race	Thi That Nguyen (VIE)	Ting Ying Huang (TAI)	Yao Chang (TAI)
Asian Cycling Championships; Myanmar (2018 summary)	U23 Road race	Zixin Liu (CHN)	Jiajun Sun (CHN)	Thi Thu Mai Nguyen (VIE)
Asian Cycling Championships; Myanmar (2018 summary)	Junior Road race	Vivien Chiu (HKG)	Anna Iwamoto (JPN)	Marina Kurnossova (KAZ)
Asian Cycling Championships; Myanmar (2018 summary)	Individual time trial	Ju Mi Lee (KOR)	Ting Ying Huang (TAI)	Miyoko Karami (JPN)
Asian Cycling Championships; Myanmar (2018 summary)	U23 Individual time trial	Zixin Liu (CHN)	Wing Yee Leung (HKG)	Nur Aisyah Mohamad Zubir (MAS)
Asian Cycling Championships; Myanmar (2018 summary)	Junior Individual time trial	Marina Kurnossova (KAZ)	Yuno Ishigami (JPN)	Sze Wing Lee (HKG)
European Road Championships; United Kingdom (2018 summary)	Road race	Marta Bastianelli (ITA)	Marianne Vos (NED)	Lisa Brennauer (GER)
European Road Championships; United Kingdom (2018 summary)	Individual time trial	Ellen van Dijk (NED)	Anna van der Breggen (NED)	Trixi Worrack (GER)
European Road Championships; United Kingdom (2018 summary)	Road race (U23)	Nikola Nosková (CZE)	Aafke Soet (NED)	Letizia Paternoster (ITA)
European Road Championships; United Kingdom (2018 summary)	Individual time trial (U23)	Aafke Soet (NED)	Lisa Klein (GER)	Nikola Nosková (CZE)

== UCI teams ==
The country designation of each team is determined by the country of registration of the largest number of its riders, and is not necessarily the country where the team is registered or based.
