= 2018 Women's Tour Down Under =

Race details
- Dates: 11–14 January 2018
- Stages: 4
- Distance: 384 km (239 mi)
- Winning time: 10h 47' 21"

Results
Jersey awarded to the overall winner	Winner	Amanda Spratt (AUS)	(Mitchelton–Scott)
	Second	Lauren Stephens (USA)	(Cylance Pro Cycling)
	Third	Katrin Garfoot (AUS)	(UniSA–Australia)
Jersey awarded to the mountains classification winner	Mountains	Amanda Spratt (AUS)	(Mitchelton–Scott)
Jersey awarded to the young rider classification winner	Young rider	Grace Anderson (NZL)	(New Zealand (national team))
Jersey awarded to the sprints classification winner	Sprints	Katrin Garfoot (AUS)	(UniSA–Australia)
	Team	Mitchelton–Scott	

The 2018 Santos Women's Tour Down Under was a women's cycle stage race held in Australia from 11 to 14 January, 2018. The Women's Tour Down Under, being held for the third time, was held as a UCI rating of 2.1 race, having been a 2.2 race in 2017.

The race was won for the second year in succession – becoming the first rider to win multiple Tour Down Under races – by Mitchelton–Scott rider Amanda Spratt. Spratt placed third on the stage to Mengler Hill, and assumed the race leader's ochre jersey the following day by winning the stage into Hahndorf. Spratt won the race by 41 seconds ahead of Lauren Stephens, riding for Cylance Pro Cycling. 2016 race winner Katrin Garfoot completed the podium, riding for the UniSA–Australia team, a further 40 seconds in arrears of Stephens. With her above finishes on hill-top stages, Spratt won the polka-dot jersey for the mountains classification, while Garfoot won the sprints classification and its green jersey on the final day in Adelaide, winning all four intermediate sprints during the stage.

The race's other jersey, the white jersey, went to Grace Anderson of the New Zealand national team, as the best-placed rider – in ninth overall – under the age of 25. Mitchelton–Scott won the teams classification, after placing Spratt, Lucy Kennedy and Annemiek van Vleuten in the top-six overall.

== Teams ==
17 teams participated in the 2018 Women's Tour Down Under.

UCI Women's Teams

- Alé–Cipollini
- Bepink
- Cylance Pro Cycling
- Mitchelton–Scott
- Tibco–Silicon Valley Bank
- Trek–Drops
- Twenty20 p/b Sho-Air
- Team Virtu Cycling
- WaowDeals Pro Cycling
- Wiggle High5

Other teams

- Holden Team Gusto Racing
- Maaslandster International
- New Zealand (national team)
- Specialized Women's Racing
- Sydney Uni–Staminade
- TIS Racing
- UniSA–Australia

== Route ==
The race route was announced on 22 November 2017.

List of stages
Stage	Date	Course	Distance	Type	Winner
1	11 January	Gumeracha to Gumeracha	115.7 km (71.9 mi)	Hilly stage	Annette Edmondson (AUS)
2	12 January	Lyndoch to Mengler Hill	101.2 km (62.9 mi)	Hilly stage	Katrin Garfoot (AUS)
3	13 January	The Bend Motorsport Park to Hahndorf	121.1 km (75.2 mi)	Hilly stage	Amanda Spratt (AUS)
4	14 January	Adelaide	46 km (28.6 mi)	Flat stage	Chloe Hosking (AUS)

== Stages ==
=== Stage 1 ===
11 January 2018 — Gumeracha to Gumeracha, 115.7 km (71.9 mi)

Result of Stage 1
Rank	Rider	Team	Time
1	Annette Edmondson (AUS)	Wiggle High5	3h 08' 53"
2	Giorgia Bronzini (ITA)	Cylance Pro Cycling	+ 0"
3	Lauretta Hanson (AUS)	UniSA–Australia	+ 0"
4	Sarah Roy (AUS)	Mitchelton–Scott	+ 0"
5	Emilie Moberg (NOR)	Team Virtu Cycling	+ 0"
6	Chloe Hosking (AUS)	Alé–Cipollini	+ 0"
7	Maria Vittoria Sperotto (ITA)	Bepink	+ 0"
8	Kristina Clonan (AUS)	TIS Racing	+ 0"
9	Barbara Guarischi (ITA)	Team Virtu Cycling	+ 0"
10	Georgia Baker (AUS)	TIS Racing	+ 0"

General classification after Stage 1
Rank	Rider	Team	Time
1	Annette Edmondson (AUS)	Wiggle High5	3h 08' 41"
2	Giorgia Bronzini (ITA)	Cylance Pro Cycling	+ 6"
3	Lauretta Hanson (AUS)	UniSA–Australia	+ 8"
4	Chloe Hosking (AUS)	Alé–Cipollini	+ 9"
5	Emilie Moberg (NOR)	Team Virtu Cycling	+ 11"
6	Sarah Roy (AUS)	Mitchelton–Scott	+ 12"
7	Maria Vittoria Sperotto (ITA)	Bepink	+ 12"
8	Kristina Clonan (AUS)	TIS Racing	+ 12"
9	Barbara Guarischi (ITA)	Team Virtu Cycling	+ 12"
10	Georgia Baker (AUS)	TIS Racing	+ 12"

=== Stage 2 ===
12 January 2018 — Lyndoch to Mengler Hill, 101.2 km (62.9 mi)

Result of Stage 2
Rank	Rider	Team	Time
1	Katrin Garfoot (AUS)	UniSA–Australia	2h 43' 43"
2	Lucy Kennedy (AUS)	Mitchelton–Scott	+ 0"
3	Amanda Spratt (AUS)	Mitchelton–Scott	+ 8"
4	Annemiek van Vleuten (NED)	Mitchelton–Scott	+ 15"
5	Kate McIlroy (NZL)	Specialized Women's Racing	+ 16"
6	Shannon Malseed (AUS)	Tibco–Silicon Valley Bank	+ 21"
7	Lauren Stephens (USA)	Cylance Pro Cycling	+ 21"
8	Kathrin Hammes (GER)	Trek–Drops	+ 51"
9	Taryn Heather (AUS)	Specialized Women's Racing	+ 51"
10	Grace Brown (AUS)	Holden Team Gusto Racing	+ 51"

General classification after Stage 2
Rank	Rider	Team	Time
1	Katrin Garfoot (AUS)	UniSA–Australia	5h 52' 26"
2	Lucy Kennedy (AUS)	Mitchelton–Scott	+ 4"
3	Amanda Spratt (AUS)	Mitchelton–Scott	+ 14"
4	Annemiek van Vleuten (NED)	Mitchelton–Scott	+ 25"
5	Kate McIlroy (NZL)	Specialized Women's Racing	+ 26"
6	Lauren Stephens (USA)	Cylance Pro Cycling	+ 31"
7	Shannon Malseed (AUS)	Tibco–Silicon Valley Bank	+ 31"
8	Taryn Heather (AUS)	Specialized Women's Racing	+ 1' 01"
9	Grace Brown (AUS)	Holden Team Gusto Racing	+ 1' 01"
10	Kathrin Hammes (GER)	Trek–Drops	+ 1' 01"

=== Stage 3 ===
13 January 2018 — The Bend Motorsport Park to Hahndorf, 121.1 km (75.2 mi)

Result of Stage 3
Rank	Rider	Team	Time
1	Amanda Spratt (AUS)	Mitchelton–Scott	3h 47' 24"
2	Lauren Stephens (USA)	Cylance Pro Cycling	+ 7"
3	Grace Brown (AUS)	Holden Team Gusto Racing	+ 59"
4	Katrin Garfoot (AUS)	UniSA–Australia	+ 1' 32"
5	Lucy Kennedy (AUS)	Mitchelton–Scott	+ 1' 34"
6	Emma Grant (GBR)	Tibco–Silicon Valley Bank	+ 1' 34"
7	Mikayla Harvey (NZL)	New Zealand (national team)	+ 1' 38"
8	Grace Anderson (NZL)	New Zealand (national team)	+ 1' 40"
9	Chloe Hosking (AUS)	Alé–Cipollini	+ 1' 40"
10	Marlies Mejías (CUB)	Twenty20 p/b Sho-Air	+ 1' 40"

General classification after Stage 3
Rank	Rider	Team	Time
1	Amanda Spratt (AUS)	Mitchelton–Scott	9h 39' 52"
2	Lauren Stephens (USA)	Cylance Pro Cycling	+ 29"
3	Katrin Garfoot (AUS)	UniSA–Australia	+ 1' 30"
4	Lucy Kennedy (AUS)	Mitchelton–Scott	+ 1' 36"
5	Grace Brown (AUS)	Holden Team Gusto Racing	+ 1' 54"
6	Annemiek van Vleuten (NED)	Mitchelton–Scott	+ 2' 07"
7	Shannon Malseed (AUS)	Tibco–Silicon Valley Bank	+ 2' 09"
8	Kate McIlroy (NZL)	Specialized Women's Racing	+ 2' 25"
9	Grace Anderson (NZL)	New Zealand (national team)	+ 2' 42"
10	Emma Grant (GBR)	Tibco–Silicon Valley Bank	+ 2' 46"

=== Stage 4 ===
14 January 2018 — Adelaide, 46 km (28.6 mi)

Result of Stage 4
Rank	Rider	Team	Time
1	Chloe Hosking (AUS)	Alé–Cipollini	1h 07' 29"
2	Giorgia Bronzini (ITA)	Cylance Pro Cycling	+ 0"
3	Annette Edmondson (AUS)	Wiggle High5	+ 0"
4	Abi Van Twisk (GBR)	Trek–Drops	+ 0"
5	Maria Vittoria Sperotto (ITA)	Bepink	+ 0"
6	Emilie Moberg (NOR)	Team Virtu Cycling	+ 0"
7	Jelena Erić (SRB)	Cylance Pro Cycling	+ 0"
8	Sarah Roy (AUS)	Mitchelton–Scott	+ 0"
9	Alison Jackson (CAN)	Tibco–Silicon Valley Bank	+ 0"
10	Marlies Mejías (CUB)	Twenty20 p/b Sho-Air	+ 0"

Final general classification
Rank	Rider	Team	Time
1	Amanda Spratt (AUS)	Mitchelton–Scott	10h 47' 21"
2	Lauren Stephens (USA)	Cylance Pro Cycling	+ 41"
3	Katrin Garfoot (AUS)	UniSA–Australia	+ 1' 21"
4	Lucy Kennedy (AUS)	Mitchelton–Scott	+ 1' 36"
5	Grace Brown (AUS)	Holden Team Gusto Racing	+ 1' 54"
6	Annemiek van Vleuten (NED)	Mitchelton–Scott	+ 2' 07"
7	Shannon Malseed (AUS)	Tibco–Silicon Valley Bank	+ 2' 09"
8	Kate McIlroy (NZL)	Specialized Women's Racing	+ 2' 25"
9	Grace Anderson (NZL)	New Zealand (national team)	+ 2' 42"
10	Emma Grant (GBR)	Tibco–Silicon Valley Bank	+ 2' 46"

== Classification leadership table ==
In the 2018 Women's Tour Down Under, four different jerseys were awarded. For the general classification, calculated by adding each cyclist's finishing times on each stage, and allowing time bonuses for the first three finishers at intermediate sprints and at the finish of mass-start stages, the leader received an ochre jersey. This classification was considered the most important of the 2018 Women's Tour Down Under, and the winner of the classification was considered the winner of the race.

Additionally, there was a sprints classification, which awarded a green jersey. In the sprints classification, cyclists received points for finishing in the top 8 in a stage. For winning a stage, a rider earned 16 points, with 12 for second, 8 for third, 6 for fourth, with one point fewer per place down to 2 points for 8th place. Points towards the classification could also be accrued – awarded on a 5–3–2 scale – at intermediate sprint points during each stage; these intermediate sprints also offered bonus seconds towards the general classification as noted above. There was also a mountains classification, the leadership of which was marked by a white jersey with navy polka dots. In the mountains classification, points were won by reaching the top of a climb before other cyclists, with more points available for the higher-categorised climbs.

The fourth jersey represented the young rider classification, marked by a white jersey. This was decided in the same way as the general classification, but only riders born after 1 January 1993 were eligible to be ranked in the classification. There was also a classification for teams, in which the times of the best three cyclists per team on each stage were added together; the leading team at the end of the race was the team with the lowest total time.

Stage	Winner	General classification	Mountains classification	Sprint classification	Young rider classification	Team classification
1	Annette Edmondson	Annette Edmondson	Sabrina Stultiens	Annette Edmondson	Maria Vittoria Sperotto	UniSA–Australia
2	Katrin Garfoot	Katrin Garfoot	Katrin Garfoot	Annette Edmondson	Grace Anderson	Mitchelton–Scott
3	Amanda Spratt	Amanda Spratt	Amanda Spratt	Amanda Spratt	Grace Anderson	Mitchelton–Scott
4	Chloe Hosking	Amanda Spratt	Amanda Spratt	Katrin Garfoot	Grace Anderson	Mitchelton–Scott
Final		Amanda Spratt	Amanda Spratt	Katrin Garfoot	Grace Anderson	Mitchelton–Scott

== Classification standings ==
Legend
Denotes the leader of the general classification	Denotes the leader of the sprints classification
Denotes the leader of the mountains classification	Denotes the leader of the young rider classification

=== General classification ===
Final general classification (1–10)
Rank	Rider	Team	Time
1	Amanda Spratt (AUS)	Mitchelton–Scott	10h 47' 21"
2	Lauren Stephens (USA)	Cylance Pro Cycling	+ 41"
3	Katrin Garfoot (AUS)	UniSA–Australia	+ 1' 21"
4	Lucy Kennedy (AUS)	Mitchelton–Scott	+ 1' 36"
5	Grace Brown (AUS)	Holden Team Gusto Racing	+ 1' 54"
6	Annemiek van Vleuten (NED)	Mitchelton–Scott	+ 2' 07"
7	Shannon Malseed (AUS)	Tibco–Silicon Valley Bank	+ 2' 09"
8	Kate McIlroy (NZL)	Specialized Women's Racing	+ 2' 25"
9	Grace Anderson (NZL)	New Zealand (national team)	+ 2' 42"
10	Emma Grant (GBR)	Tibco–Silicon Valley Bank	+ 2' 46"

=== Sprints classification ===
Final sprints classification (1–10)
Rank	Rider	Team	Points
1	Katrin Garfoot (AUS)	UniSA–Australia	42
2	Annette Edmondson (AUS)	Wiggle High5	31
3	Chloe Hosking (AUS)	Alé–Cipollini	28
4	Amanda Spratt (AUS)	Mitchelton–Scott	27
5	Giorgia Bronzini (ITA)	Cylance Pro Cycling	24
6	Lauren Stephens (USA)	Cylance Pro Cycling	19
7	Lucy Kennedy (AUS)	Mitchelton–Scott	17
8	Emilie Moberg (NOR)	Team Virtu Cycling	14
9	Abi Van Twisk (GBR)	Trek–Drops	12
10	Linda Villumsen (NZL)	Team Virtu Cycling	10

=== Mountains classification ===
Final mountains classification (1–10)
Rank	Rider	Team	Points
1	Amanda Spratt (AUS)	Mitchelton–Scott	24
2	Katrin Garfoot (AUS)	UniSA–Australia	22
3	Annemiek van Vleuten (NED)	Mitchelton–Scott	13
4	Lauren Stephens (USA)	Cylance Pro Cycling	12
5	Lucy Kennedy (AUS)	Mitchelton–Scott	12
6	Kate McIlroy (NZL)	Specialized Women's Racing	11
7	Grace Brown (AUS)	Holden Team Gusto Racing	8
8	Emma Grant (GBR)	Tibco–Silicon Valley Bank	6
9	Roxane Knetemann (NED)	Alé–Cipollini	2

=== Young rider classification ===
Final young rider classification (1–10)
Rank	Rider	Team	Time
1	Grace Anderson (NZL)	New Zealand (national team)	10h 50' 03"
2	Mikayla Harvey (NZL)	New Zealand (national team)	+ 12"
3	Abi Van Twisk (GBR)	Trek–Drops	+ 42"
4	Deborah Paine (NZL)	New Zealand (national team)	+ 1' 38"
5	Maeve Plouffe (AUS)	TIS Racing	+ 1' 57"
6	Alexandra Manly (AUS)	Mitchelton–Scott	+ 2' 28"
7	Jeanne Korevaar (NED)	WaowDeals Pro Cycling	+ 2' 28"
8	Amanda Jamieson (NZL)	Maaslandster International	+ 2' 44"
9	Rachele Barbieri (ITA)	Wiggle High5	+ 4' 07"
10	Maria Vittoria Sperotto (ITA)	Bepink	+ 13' 12"

=== Team classification ===
Final team classification (1–10)
Rank	Team	Time
1	(Australia) Mitchelton–Scott	32h 26' 08"
2	(United States) Tibco–Silicon Valley Bank	+ 4' 29"
3	(Australia) Specialized Women's Racing	+ 4' 34"
4	UniSA–Australia	+ 5' 35"
5	(United Kingdom) Trek–Drops	+ 5' 41"
6	New Zealand (national team)	+ 5' 51"
7	(United States) Cylance Pro Cycling	+ 8' 05"
8	(United Kingdom) Wiggle High5	+ 8' 06"
9	(United States) Twenty20 p/b Sho-Air	+ 9' 01"
10	(Italy) Alé–Cipollini	+ 9' 25"
