= Cycling at the 2018 Commonwealth Games – Women's road race =

Cycling – Women's road race at the 2018 Commonwealth Games
- Venue: Currumbin Beachfront
- Dates: 14 April
- Competitors: 49 from 15 nations
- Winning time: 3:02:18

Medalists
gold medal	Chloe Hosking	Australia
silver medal	Georgia Williams	New Zealand
bronze medal	Dani Rowe	Wales

The women's road race at the 2018 Commonwealth Games in Gold Coast, Australia was held on 14 April.

== Schedule ==
The schedule was as follows:

Date	Time	Round
Saturday 14 April 2018	7:45	Race

All times are Australian Eastern Standard Time (UTC+10)

== Results ==
The results were as follows:

Rank	Name	Time	Behind
1st place, gold medalist(s)	Chloe Hosking (AUS)	3:02:18	–
2nd place, silver medalist(s)	Georgia Williams (NZL)	s.t.	+0
3rd place, bronze medalist(s)	Dani Rowe (WAL)	s.t.	"
4	Sharlotte Lucas (NZL)	s.t.	"
5	Sarah Roy (AUS)	s.t.	"
6	Tiffany Cromwell (AUS)	3:02:21	+3
7	Elinor Barker (WAL)	3:02:25	+7
8	Neah Evans (SCO)	3:02:26	+8
9	Melissa Lowther (ENG)	s.t.	"
10	Hayley Simmonds (ENG)	3:02:29	+11
11	Antri Christoforou (CYP)	3:02:31	+13
12	Linda Villumsen (NZL)	3:02:43	+25
13	Katrin Garfoot (AUS)	3:02:47	+29
14	Ellie Dickinson (ENG)	3:03:32	+1:14
15	Vera Adrian (NAM)	s.t.	"
16	Abi Van Twisk (ENG)	s.t.	"
17	Annie Foreman-Mackey (CAN)	s.t.	"
18	Elizabeth Holden (IOM)	s.t.	"
19	Kate McIlroy (NZL)	s.t.	"
20	Kimberley Ashton (JEY)	s.t.	"
21	Michelle Vorster (NAM)	s.t.	"
22	Gracie Elvin (AUS)	s.t.	"
23	Katie Archibald (SCO)	3:03:38	+1:20
24	Shannon Malseed (AUS)	3:05:40	+3:22
25	Stephanie Roorda (CAN)	s.t.	"
26	Rushlee Buchanan (NZL)	s.t.	"
27	Megan Barker (WAL)	3:08:16	+5:58
28	Anna Christian (IOM)	s.t.	"
29	Allison Beveridge (CAN)	3:10:59	+8.41
30	Kimberley Le Court (MRI)	s.t.	"
31	Helen Ralston (JEY)	3:12:48	+10:30
32	Lydia Boylan (NIR)	s.t.	"
33	Aurelie Halbwachs (MRI)	3:12:57	+10:39
–	Eileen Roe (SCO)	DNF	–
–	Emily Kay (ENG)	DNF	–
–	Jessica Roberts (WAL)	DNF	–
–	Manon Lloyd (WAL)	DNF	–
–	Ariane Bonhomme (CAN)	DNF	–
–	Bryony Botha (NZL)	DNF	–
–	Eileen Burns (NIR)	DNF	–
–	Isla Short (SCO)	DNF	–
–	Hayley Jones (WAL)	DNF	–
–	Emily Nelson (ENG)	DNF	–
–	Kinley Gibson (CAN)	DNF	–
–	Karina Jackson (GGY)	DNF	–
–	Magnifique Manizabayo (RWA)	DNF	–
–	Beatha Ingabire (RWA)	DNF	–
–	Alicia Thompson (BIZ)	DNF	–
–	Louise Haston (SCO)	DNF	–
