= 2019 Women's Herald Sun Tour =

Race details
- Dates: 30–31 January 2019
- Stages: 2
- Distance: 189.4 km (117.7 mi)
- Winning time: 4h58:21

Results
Jersey awarded to the overall winner	Winner	Lucy Kennedy (AUS)	(Mitchelton–Scott)
	Second	Amanda Spratt (AUS)	(Mitchelton–Scott)
	Third	Brodie Chapman (AUS)	(Tibco–Silicon Valley Bank)
Jersey awarded to the mountains classification winner	Mountains	Lucy Kennedy (AUS)	(Mitchelton–Scott)
Jersey awarded to the youth classification winner	Youth	Jenna Merrick (NZL)	(Mike Greer Homes)
Jersey awarded to the sprints classification winner	Sprints	Chloe Hosking (AUS)	(Alé–Cipollini)
	Team	Mitchelton–Scott	

The 2019 Women's Herald Sun Tour sponsored by Lexus of Blackburn was a women's cycle stage race held in Victoria, Australia, from 30 to 31 January 2019. The 2019 edition was the second edition of the race and centred around Phillip Island and Churchill. The race was won by Lucy Kennedy.

== Route ==
List of stages
Stage	Date	Course	Distance	Type	Winner
1	30 January	Phillip Island to Phillip Island	97.9 km (60.8 mi)	Hilly stage	Chloe Hosking (AUS)
2	31 January	Churchill to Churchill	91.5 km (56.9 mi)	Hilly stage	Lucy Kennedy (AUS)

== Classification leadership table ==
Stage	Winner	General classification	Sprint classification	Mountains classification	Young rider classification	Team classification
1	Chloe Hosking	Chloe Hosking	Chloe Hosking	Not awarded	Rachele Barbieri	Mitchelton–Scott
2	Lucy Kennedy	Lucy Kennedy	Chloe Hosking	Lucy Kennedy	Jenna Merrick	Mitchelton–Scott
Final		Lucy Kennedy	Chloe Hosking	Lucy Kennedy	Jenna Merrick	Mitchelton–Scott
