= Liv AlUla Jayco =

Australian cycling team

Team information
- UCI code: LIV
- Registered: Australia
- Founded: 2012
- Discipline: Road
- Status: UCI Women's Team (2012–2019); UCI Women's WorldTeam (2020–present)
- Bicycles: Scott (2012–2020); Bianchi (2021–2023); Giant (2024–)
- Website: Team home page

Key personnel
- General manager: Brent Copeland
- Team managers: Martin Vestby; Alejandro Gonzalez-Tablas

Team name history
- 2012 2013–2016 2017 2018–2020 2021 2022 2023 2024–: GreenEDGE–AIS (GEW); Orica–AIS (GEW); Orica–Scott (ORS); Mitchelton–Scott (MTS); Team BikeExchange (BEX); Team BikeExchange–Jayco (BEX); Team Jayco–AlUla (JAY); Liv AlUla Jayco (LAJ/LIV)
Liv AlUla Jayco jersey
Jersey

Liv AlUla Jayco (UCI Code: LIV) is a women's professional cycling team based in Australia which competes in the UCI Women's World Tour and other elite women's events throughout the world.

After being sponsored by Orica for five years, the team secured sponsorship from Mitchelton Wineries and Scott bicycles, and was known as Mitchelton–Scott, from 2018 to 2020. Since merging with Liv Racing TeqFind ahead of the 2024 season, the team's title sponsors have been Liv, a sub-brand of Giant Bicycles, AlUla, a city in Saudi Arabia, and Jayco, a recreational vehicle manufacturer.

== Team history ==
Former Mitchelton–Scott logo

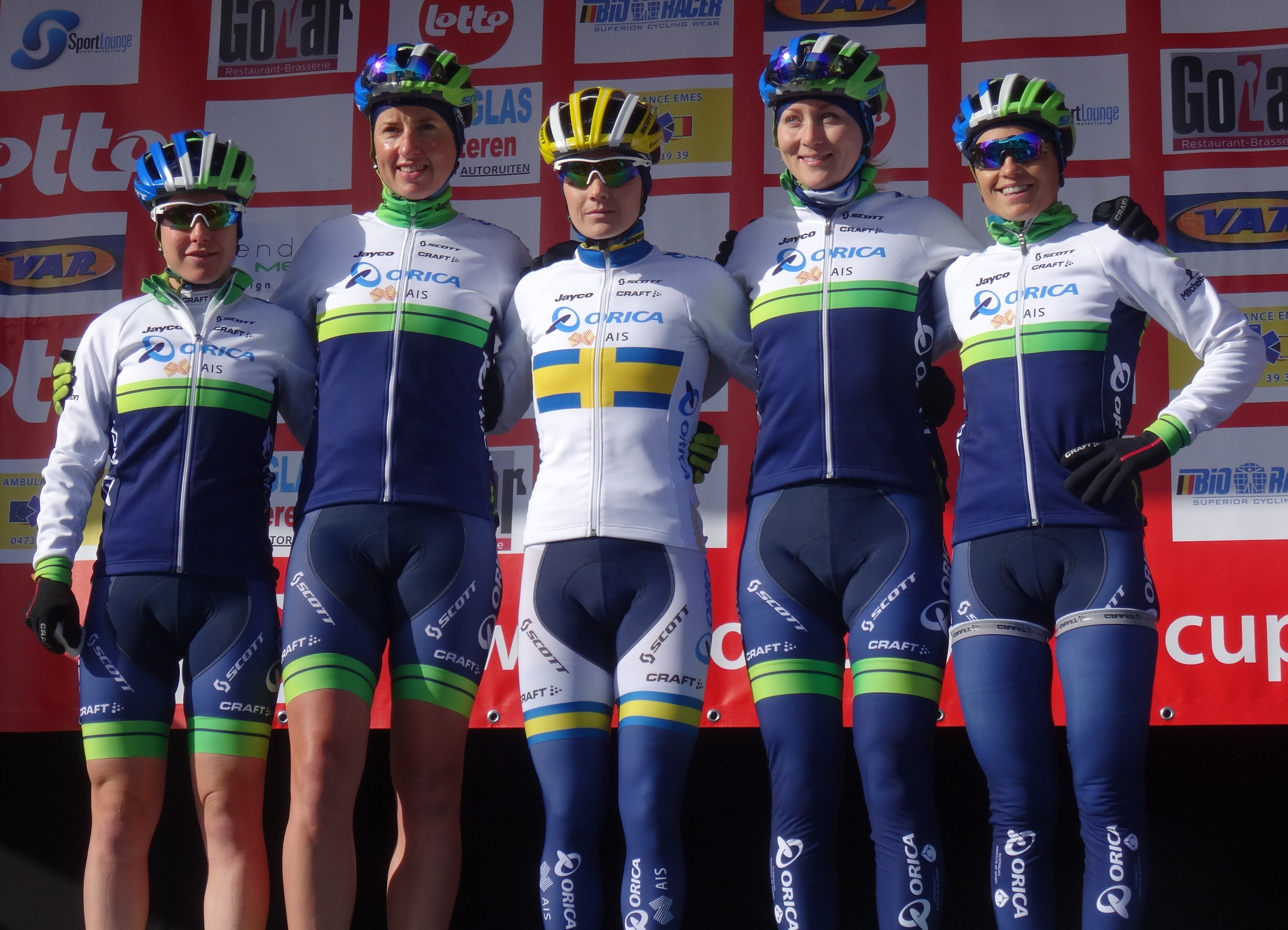
The team at the 2015 Le Samyn des Dames

=== 2014 season ===
2014 saw a change in leadership at Orica–AIS as the women's team's original directeur sportif Dave McPartland took up a role with the men's team Orica Greenedge, while former Tasmanian Institute of Sport head cycling coach Gene Bates took over McPartland's position. Martin Barras maintains his dual role as the trade team Orica–AIS assistant DS since 2012, and Cycling Australia's woman's road coach.

On 17 June, the team announced the signing of Katrin Garfoot for the remainder of the 2014 season. On 16 October Chloe McConville, Sarah Roy and Lizzie Williams signed with the team for the 2015 season with Amanda Spratt signing a contract extension. On 28 October Gracie Elvin signed a contract extension. On 4 November, Katrin Garfoot signed a contract extension. On 13 November Melissa Hoskins signed a contract extension. On 3 December, Macey Stewart and Alexandra Manly joined the team. On 13 November Carlee Taylor left the team to join Lotto–Belisol Ladies.

=== 2015 ===
The team opened its account at the Bay Classic Series where Gracie Elvin took victory in the second stage of the race. This was followed up by a double win in the Santos Women's Cup courtesy of Valentina Scandolara and Melissa Hoskins.

Former road race world championship silver medallist Rachel Neylan joined Orica–AIS at the end of March.

Loes Gunnewijk would have to prematurely retire from racing early after sustaining a broken shoulder from the year before, Gunnewijk would return to Orica–AIS in 2016 as a trainee director sportif. In August 2015, it was announced that Johansson would leave the team at the end of the 2015 season and join Wiggle High5 on a two-year deal for the 2016 season. Melissa Hoskins would move away from Orica–AIS to concentrate her efforts on the track in the lead up to the 2016 Rio Olympics. Valentina Scandolara moved to Cylance looking to advance a more leadership role and hoping to secure an Olympic placement.

=== 2016 ===
Three new signings were announced for 2016, from the disbanded Velocio-SRAM American Tayler Wiles and Australian Loren Rowney, and from Bigla Dutch Annemiek van Vleuten. After Emma Johansson left as Orica–AIS team leader and Loes Gunnewijk retiring as road captain, Gracie Elvin and Amanda Spratt were given the opportunity to step up as team leaders.

However Orica–AIS's roster aspirations didn't go to plan in 2016, Chloe McConville had planned to retire mid-way through 2016 but was forced to retire early due to a prolapsed disc back injury while on recon for the Tour of Flanders. Another casualty of the Classics season was Lizzie Williams when injury, depression and anxiety took its toll on Williams. In between road seasons, Macey Stewart participated in Track World and Oceania Championships, then onto working towards Rio 2016 left Stewart drained, and decided to spend more time with family.

Midway through the 2016 season, Orica–AIS signed Jess Allen and Jenelle Crooks from Rochelle Gilmore's High5 Dream Team Australian development team.

For both the men's Orica–GreenEDGE and women's Orica–AIS teams, GreenEDGE Cycling's headline naming sponsor Orica two-year contract would be coming to an end at the end of 2016, but Orica decided to extend its sponsorship for one more year for 2017 to provide GreenEDGE extra time to search for new sponsors. On the same month as Orica publicly announcing in June 2016 its exit from GreenEDGE, GreenEDGE Cycling's owner's Gerry Ryan's co-owned business BikeExchange took place next to Orica as naming sponsors for the men's Orica–GreenEDGE squad on the eve of July's Tour de France while the women's team maintained the same team name since Orica sponsored the team. Ahead of the 2017 season, GreenEDGE's sole longstanding bicycle supplier Scott Sports took up the task as naming sponsor alongside Orica for 2017 for three years, unifying both men's and women's teams under the same name for the first in GreenEDGE's history.

The roster of riders for 2017 remained largely the same as the 2016 season closing, but with Orica–AIS not keeping Tayler Wiles due to an uncertain 2017 budget for GreenEDGE as Orica prepares for its final year as sponsor. Australian track racer Georgia Baker took Wiles' place in the 2017 team roster.

=== 2017 ===
Orica–Scott dominated the Australian national championships, taking every green and gold jersey except for the under-23 criterium. Jessica Allen starting by claiming the elite criterium; then both Katrin Garfoot and Alexandra Manly winning both time trial and road race, elite and U23 titles respectively.

With Scott Sports taking more prominence as a naming sponsor, non-drivetrain components from Shimano subsidiary PRO such as seatposts and handlebars were replaced by Scott subsidiary Syncros. Also for 2017, Italian clothing brand Giordana replaces all apparel previously supplied from Swedish company Craft.

At the end of January, Loren Rowney officially announced her retirement from professional racing. Orica–Scott would sign long time BePink team member Georgia Williams from New Zealand who had taken a pause from road racing to focus on the track at the Rio Olympics.

After a few Women's World Tour podiums over two years with Elvin, Roy, and van Vleuten; Orica–Scott accomplished its breakthrough WWT win on Stage 4 at The Women's Tour with sprinter Sarah Roy. Orica–Scott also achieved its milestone first one-day WWT win at La Course, and WWT general classification victory at the Boels Ladies Tour with Annemiek van Vleuten.

Although GreenEDGE had set up a Chinese-registered continental men's team, Mitchelton–Scott at the start of the year in order to attract a new naming sponsor in the Far East after Orica's five year commitment finished up at the end of 2017. In September, a week before the road world championships, Cycling Australia confirmed it would withdraw support from both the Orica–Scott women's team and the Mitchelton–Scott U23 team at the end of 2017. In order to fill the funding gap, GreenEDGE owner Gerry Ryan will step in for CA and Orica for 2018, and continue supporting the women's team and U23 men's team even though the team had been unsuccessful in finding a replacement sponsor for Orica. By December, with the team unable to bring in a new title sponsor outside the Ryan family business, GreenEDGE announced their new team names and title sponsors for 2018 men's World Tour and UCI women's teams as Mitchelton–Scott. The U23 continental men's team that previously used the Mitchelton–Scott team name in 2017, announced its naming co-sponsors for 2018 with Ryan family businesses just ahead of the Australian national championships in January 2018, racing as Mitchelton–BikeExchange. With Orica exiting sponsorship of the teams, the team jerseys' loses their blue colours, for 2018 the team adopts Scott Sports RC (Racing Concept) team colours of black and yellow as used by the Scott mountain bike teams.

At the Bergen road world championships, the team scored its first road rainbow jersey in either men's or women's team with Van Vleuten in the individual time trial, becoming the third Dutch woman to ever win the time trial gold medal. The closest the team had gotten to the rainbow jersey was in 2012 with Judith Arndt who earned it the year before at HTC–Highroad Women, she then retired from racing after the Limburg world championships with another ITT rainbow jersey. Katrin Garfoot earned two individual world championship medals in the same Bergen world championships with a bronze in the time trial and a silver at the road race, being only the second Australian to achieve such a feat since Anna Wilson. Both Orica–Scott and Boels–Dolmans claimed three each of all the individual elite women's medals available at the 2017 world championships.

On the eve of the world championship time trial, Orica–Scott announced its first signing for 2018 that Annemiek van Vleuten would extend her contract with the team for another two years. During the world championship week, the team announced Belgian Jolien D'Hoore would join the team for 2018 after her three years at Wiggle High5. At the start of October, Spanish team Movistar announced Rachel Neylan would be joining their new women's team as one of its experienced riders in the relatively young roster, after her three years at Orica. Lucy Kennedy signs with Orica Scott, coming from Rochelle Gilmore's High5 Dream Team after strong performances in the domestic scene, and with the Australian Development Team in 2017 overseas in Europe. Kat Garfoot confirmed that she would not renew her contract with the team, but she would still continue to work towards her home 2018 Commonwealth Games at the Gold Coast, with GreenEDGE providing access to her familiar bikes. Garfoot citing not wanting to be separate from family while racing in Europe, and the team unable to support her racing in Australia. Georgia Baker returns to domestic road racing with TIS Racing, and continues with Cycling Australia's track scholarship along with teammate Alex Manly.

The team starts 2018 with ten riders; Allen, Crooks, D'hoore, Kennedy, Manly, Spratt, Williams signing for one year. Together with Van Vleuten, Gracie Elvin and Sarah Roy re-signed with GreenEDGE for two more years.

=== 2018 ===
In between 2017 and 2018 seasons, former directeur sportif Martin Barras was removed as the Cycling Australia's national women's road coach after the September's Bergen 2017 road world championships as a part of restructuring by Cycling Australia's new high performance director Simon Jones, his last race directing Orica–Scott was the women's Tour of Guangxi in October. Barras later taking up the role as Cycling New Zealand's high performance director. Taking the place of Barras' DS role was former Wiggle High5 DS Martin Vestby.

Mitchelton–Scott started the year in its national championship campaigns in Australia and New Zealand, with Sarah Roy achieving her best Australian National Criterium Championships finish with GreenEDGE with a second place since previously winning the title in 2014 when signed with Poitou-Charentes.Futuroscope.86. Georgia Williams won the New Zealand time trial championships after multiple podiums in previous years' time trial and road race, Alexandra Manly followed up last year's U23 time trial win with another, while new signing Lucy Kennedy achieved a silver medal in the elite time trial classification. Georgia Williams followed up her time trial win the previous day by claiming the elite road race title in a solo breakaway, gapping the peloton by just under five minutes at the finish line. Alexandra repeated her 2017 nationals results by again winning the under-23 classification in the road race; in the elites, Amanda Spratt missed out on a podium, finishing fourth in a seven rider sprint. Mitchelton–Scott earned their first international win of the year with Amanda Spratt in a breakaway on stage 3 of the Tour Down Under putting a minute and a half into former teammate and GC leader Katrin Garfoot; claiming the GC, climber's jersey and the team's classification.

Four Mitchelton–Scott riders were named to be participating at the Cycling at the 2018 Commonwealth Games in Australia in April; for Australia in the road race, Gracie Elvin and Sarah Roy, and on the track, Alex Manly. Representing New Zealand as a part of their Commonwealth Games road race squad is Georgia Williams. Alex Manly was part of the squad for the newly added team pursuit event to the women's Commonwealth Games programme, with a time in the finals that would have unseated defending world champions USA at the 2018 Apeldoorn world championships. Georgia Williams won New Zealand's second ever medal in the women's road race at a Commonwealth Games, a silver medal since the 1998 Commonwealth Games; Mitchelton–Scott teammate Sarah Roy finished fifth in the reduced bunch sprint.

The team claimed its first European race win with newly signed sprinter Jolien D'Hoore at the inaugural Three Days De Panne Koksijde. The team won its first WWT stage race in 2018 at Emakumeen Euskal Bira in May, eventually finishing with riders in first, second, and fourth in the general classification, with Amanda Spratt winning for her first ever top level UCI status race. In July, the Mitchelton–Scott women's team achieve the GreenEDGE organisation's first Grand Tour win at the 2018 Giro Rosa. Finishing the Giro with six stage wins of the ten stages by D'hoore, Spratt, and Van Vleuten; and every jersey the team were eligible for, the general classification pink jersey and points purple jersey with Van Vleuten, the mountains green jersey with Spratt. Spratt's stage six win, put an Australian in the maglia rosa, the first time since Shara Gillow on stage 2 in 2012, and her third place on GC is the first Australian final GC podium at the Giro since 1994 by Kathy Watt. After Van Vleuten claimed another Women's World Tour level stage race GC win at September's Boels Ladies Tour, Mitchelton–Scott has won three of six of the WWT stage races it had attended, and the only team with WWT stage race GC wins in 2018.

Ahead of the 2018 UCI Road World Championships, half of the team's ten members were selected to represent their country, for Australia, Lucy Kennedy, Sarah Roy, and Amanda Spratt, for New Zealand, Georgia Williams, and for the Netherlands, Annemiek van Vleuten.

== Team roster ==
As of 17 January 2025.

Rider	Date of birth
Caroline Andersson (SWE)	29 July 2001 (age 25)
Georgia Baker (AUS)	21 September 1994 (age 32)
Mavi García (ESP)	2 January 1984 (age 42)
Jeanne Korevaar (NED)	24 September 1996 (age 30)
Amber Pate (AUS)	21 April 1995 (age 31)
Letizia Paternoster (ITA)	22 July 1999 (age 27)
Ruby Roseman-Gannon (AUS)	8 November 1998 (age 28)

Rider	Date of birth
Silke Smulders (NED)	1 April 2001 (age 25)
Josie Talbot (AUS)	9 August 1996 (age 30)
Quinty Ton (NED)	4 August 1998 (age 28)
Anna Trevisi (ITA)	8 May 1992 (age 34)
Monica Trinca Colonel (ITA)	21 May 1999 (age 27)
Amber van der Hulst (NED)	21 September 1999 (age 27)
Ella Wyllie (NZL)	1 September 2002 (age 24)

== Major wins ==
2012
Overall Rendition Homes-Santos Women's Cup, Judith Arndt

Stage 2, Judith Arndt
Stage 3, Alexis Rhodes

Overall Ladies Tour of Qatar, Judith Arndt
Stage 3 Women's Tour of New Zealand, Judith Arndt
Omloop Het Nieuwsblad, Loes Gunnewijk
Stage 5 Women's Tour of New Zealand, Linda Villumsen
Tour of Flanders for Women, Judith Arndt
Overall Tour of Chongming Island Stage Race, Melissa Hoskins

Stages 1 & 3, Melissa Hoskins

Stage 4 The Exergy Tour, Claudia Häusler
Overall Emakumeen Euskal Bira, Judith Arndt

Stage 3, Linda Villumsen

Overall Giro del Trentino Alto Adige-Südtirol, Linda Villumsen

Stage 2b, Linda Villumsen

Stage 5 Giro d'Italia Femminile, Tiffany Cromwell
Overall Thüringen Rundfahrt der Frauen, Judith Arndt

2013
Teams classification Ladies Tour of Qatar
Omloop Het Nieuwsblad, Tiffany Cromwell
Cholet Pays de Loire Dames, Emma Johansson
Teams classification Energiewacht Tour
Overall Tour of Chongming Island, Annette Edmondson

Stage 3, Annette Edmondson

Gooik–Geraardsbergen–Gooik, Emma Johansson
Overall Emakumeen Euskal Bira, Emma Johansson

Teams classification
Stages 2 & 3 (ITT), Emma Johansson

Stage 2 Giro del Trentino Alto Adige-Südtirol, Emma Johansson
Overall Thüringen Rundfahrt der Frauen, Emma Johansson

Stage 1, Emma Johansson
Stage 4, Shara Gillow

Prologue La Route de France, Emma Johansson
Teams classification Belgium Tour
Combativity award Stage 4 Belgium Tour, Loes Gunnewijk
UCI Team Road World Rankings

2014
Overall Santos Women's Cup, Loes Gunnewijk

Stage 1, Loes Gunnewijk
Stage 2, Amanda Spratt
Stage 3, Shara Gillow

Le Samyn des Dames, Emma Johansson
Cholet Pays de Loire Dames, Emma Johansson
Trofeo Alfredo Binda-Comune di Cittiglio, Emma Johansson
Stage 1 The Women's Tour, Emma Johansson
Holland Hills Classic, Emma Johansson
Giro del Trentino Alto Adige-Südtirol, Valentina Scandolara
Stage 4 Combativity award Internationale Thüringen Rundfahrt der Frauen, Gracie Elvin
Overall BeNe Ladies Tour, Emma Johansson

Stage 2a, Emma Johansson

Commonwealth Games Track Championships (Scratch race), Annette Edmondson
Combativity award Stage 3 Holland Ladies Tour, Valentina Scandolara
Stage 6 Holland Ladies Tour, Emma Johansson

2015
Stage 2 Bay Classic Series, Gracie Elvin
Overall Santos Women's Tour, Valentina Scandolara

Teams classification
Stage 1, Valentina Scandolara
Stages 2 & 4, Melissa Hoskins

SwissEver GP Cham-Hagendorn, Lizzie Williams
Gooik–Geraardsbergen–Gooik, Gracie Elvin
Durango-Durango Emakumeen Saria, Emma Johansson
Stages 2 & 4 Emakumeen Euskal Bira, Emma Johansson
Giro del Trentino Alto Adige-Südtirol, Amanda Spratt
Overall Thüringen Rundfahrt der Frauen, Emma Johansson

Teams classification
Stage 3b, Gracie Elvin

Overall Trophée d'Or Féminin, Rachel Neylan

Stage 3, Rachel Neylan

Stage 4 Tour Cycliste Féminin International de l'Ardèche, Valentina Scandolara
Overall Belgium Tour, Emma Johansson

2016
Overall Santos Women's Tour, Katrin Garfoot

Teams classification
Stage 1, Katrin Garfoot
Stage 3, Lizzie Williams

Cadel Evans Great Ocean Road Race, Amanda Spratt
Stage 2 Ladies Tour of Qatar, Katrin Garfoot
Prologue Festival Elsy Jacobs, Annemiek van Vleuten
Gooik–Geraardsbergen–Gooik, Gracie Elvin
Stage 2a (ITT) Auensteiner–Radsporttage, Annemiek van Vleuten
Stage 2 Tour de Feminin-O cenu Českého Švýcarska, Loren Rowney
Teams classification Thüringen Rundfahrt der Frauen

Stage 6, Amanda Spratt

Stage 4 Holland Ladies Tour, Sarah Roy
Chrono Champenois, Katrin Garfoot

2017
Overall Santos Women's Tour, Amanda Spratt

Teams classification
Stage 1, Amanda Spratt

Cadel Evans Great Ocean Road Race, Annemiek van Vleuten
Durango-Durango Emakumeen Saria, Annemiek van Vleuten
Teams classification Emakumeen Euskal Bira

Stage 2, Amanda Spratt
Stage 3, Katrin Garfoot
Stage 4, Annemiek van Vleuten

SwissEver GP Cham-Hagendorn, Sarah Roy
Stage 4 The Women's Tour, Sarah Roy
Points classification Giro d'Italia Femminile, Annemiek van Vleuten

Mountains classification, Annemiek van Vleuten
Stages 2 & 5, Annemiek van Vleuten

La Course by Le Tour de France, Annemiek van Vleuten
RaboRonde Heerlen, Annemiek van Vleuten
Overall Holland Ladies Tour, Annemiek van Vleuten

Prologue & Stage 3, Annemiek van Vleuten

2018
Overall Women's Tour Down Under, Amanda Spratt

Mountains classification, Amanda Spratt
Teams classification
Stage 3, Amanda Spratt

Stage 2 (ITT) Women's Herald Sun Tour, Annemiek van Vleuten
Three Days of Bruges–De Panne, Jolien D'Hoore
Commonwealth Games, Team Pursuit, Alexandra Manly
Overall Emakumeen Euskal Bira, Amanda Spratt

Team classification
Stage 2 (ITT), Annemiek van Vleuten
Stage 4, Amanda Spratt

GP Cham-Hagendorn, Amanda Spratt
Gooik–Geraardsbergen–Gooik, Sarah Roy
Stage 1 The Women's Tour, Jolien D'Hoore
Stage 3 The Women's Tour, Sarah Roy
Overall Giro Rosa, Annemiek van Vleuten

Points classification, Annemiek van Vleuten
Mountains classification, Amanda Spratt
Stages 3 & 4, Jolien D'Hoore
Stages 7 (ITT), 9 & 10, Annemiek van Vleuten
Stage 6, Amanda Spratt

La Course by Le Tour de France, Annemiek van Vleuten
Overall Holland Ladies Tour, Annemiek van Vleuten

Points classification, Annemiek van Vleuten
Prologue, Stages 1 & 5, Annemiek van Vleuten

Overall UCI Women's World Tour, Annemiek van Vleuten
Taiwan KOM Challenge, Lucy Kennedy

2019
Overall Women's Tour Down Under, Amanda Spratt

Points classification, Sarah Roy
Team classification
Stage 2, Amanda Spratt
Stage 3, Grace Brown

Overall Women's Herald Sun Tour, Lucy Kennedy

Stage 2, Lucy Kennedy
Mountains classification, Lucy Kennedy
Team classification

Strade Bianche, Annemiek van Vleuten
Liège–Bastogne–Liège, Annemiek van Vleuten
Durango-Durango Emakumeen Saria, Lucy Kennedy
Stage 2 Emakumeen Euskal Bira, Amanda Spratt
Overall Giro Rosa, Annemiek van Vleuten

Points classification, Annemiek van Vleuten
Mountains classification, Annemiek van Vleuten
Stages 5 & 6 (ITT), Annemiek van Vleuten

Clasica Femenina Navarra, Sarah Roy
Donostia San Sebastian Klasikoa, Lucy Kennedy
Prologue Holland Ladies Tour, Annemiek van Vleuten

2020
Stage 2 Women's Tour Down Under, Amanda Spratt
Stage 1 Bay Classic Series, Amanda Spratt
Overall Women's Herald Sun Tour, Lucy Kennedy
Omloop Het Nieuwsblad, Annemiek van Vleuten
Brabantse Pijl, Grace Brown
Emakumeen Nafarroako Klasikoa, Annemiek van Vleuten
Durango-Durango Emakumeen Saria, Annemiek van Vleuten
Strade Bianche, Annemiek van Vleuten

2021
Classic Brugge–De Panne, Grace Brown
Stage 1 Vuelta a Burgos Feminas, Grace Brown
Stage 4 Setmana Ciclista Valenciana, Urška Žigart
Stage 6 Tour Cycliste Féminin International de l'Ardèche, Teniel Campbell

2023
Stage 2 Tour Down Under, Alexandra Manly

== National, Continental and World Champions ==
2012
Australian U23 Criterium, Melissa Hoskins
Australian Criterium, Alex Rhodes
Australian Road Race, Amanda Spratt
Australian Time Trial, Shara Gillow
Australian Track (Team pursuit), Melissa Hoskins
Oceania Time Trial, Shara Gillow
German Road Race, Judith Arndt
German Time Trial, Judith Arndt
World Time Trial, Judith Arndt

2013
Australian Road Race, Gracie Elvin
Australian Time Trial, Shara Gillow
Australian Track (Individual pursuit), Annette Edmondson
Swedish Time Trial, Emma Johansson
Australian Track (Omnium), Annette Edmondson
Australian Track (Madison), Annette Edmondson
Oceania Track (Points race), Annette Edmondson
Oceania Track (Omnium), Annette Edmondson

2014
National Cyclo-cross, Emma Johansson
Australian Road Race, Gracie Elvin
Oceania Time Trial, Shara Gillow
Australian Track (Scratch race), Annette Edmondson
Australian Track (Points race), Annette Edmondson
Australian Track (Omnium), Annette Edmondson
Australian Track (Madison), Annette Edmondson
Swedish Time Trial, Emma Johansson
Swedish Road Race, Emma Johansson
Oceania Track (Individual pursuit), Annette Edmondson
Oceania Track (Omnium), Annette Edmondson

2015
Australian Track (Team Pursuit), Macey Stewart
Oceania Time Trial, Katrin Garfoot
World Track (Team pursuit), Melissa Hoskins
Swedish Time Trial, Emma Johansson
Swedish Road Race, Emma Johansson

2016
Australian Time Trial, Katrin Garfoot
Australian Road Race, Amanda Spratt
Oceania Time Trial, Katrin Garfoot
Netherlands Time Trial, Annemiek van Vleuten

2017
Oceania Track (Team pursuit), Alexandra Manly
Australian Criterium, Jessica Allen
Australian Time Trial, Katrin Garfoot
Australian Road Race, Katrin Garfoot
Australian U23 Time Trial, Alexandra Manly
Australian U23 Road Race, Alexandra Manly
Australian Track (Team Pursuit), Alexandra Manly
Netherlands Time Trial, Annemiek van Vleuten
World Time trial, Annemiek van Vleuten
Netherlands Cross Country Marathon, Annemiek van Vleuten

2018
New Zealand Time Trial, Georgia Williams
Australian U23 Time Trial, Alexandra Manly
New Zealand Road Race, Georgia Williams
Australian U23 Road Race, Alexandra Manly
Australian Track (Team pursuit), Alexandra Manly
World Time Trial, Annemiek van Vleuten

2019
New Zealand Time Trial, Georgia Williams
Australian Time Trial, Grace Brown
World Track (Team pursuit), Alexandra Manly
Netherlands Time Trial, Annemiek van Vleuten
World Road Race, Annemiek van Vleuten

2020
Australian Road Race, Amanda Spratt
European Road Race, Annemiek van Vleuten

2021
Australian Road Race, Sarah Roy

2022
Australian Criterium, Ruby Roseman-Gannon
New Zealand Time Trial, Georgia Williams
Slovenian Time Trial, Urška Žigart
Trinidad & Tobago Road race, Teniel Campbell
