= Martin Barras =

French-Canadian cycling coach

Martin Barras (born 23 February 1962 in Quebec) is a French-Canadian cycling coach who has coached British and Australian Olympic teams.

Barras was employed as a track cycling coach at the Western Australian Institute of Sport from 1995 to 1998 where he coached Ryan Bayley. In 1999, he was appointed coach with Great Britain's sprint cycling program and his athletes - won gold (Jason Queally) and silver medals (team sprint) at the 2000 Sydney Olympics. In 2001, he was appointed Australian Institute of Sport / Cycling Australia track sprint coach. In 2002 and 2004, he was named Australian Institute of Sport Coach of the Year.

He had a very successful 2004 Athens Olympics with Ryan Bayley winning two gold medals, Anna Meares one gold medal and one bronze medal and Shane Kelly winning a bronze medal. After the being track sprint coach at the 2008 Beijing Olympics, where the Australian team won only one track medal, he transferred to Australia Institute of Sport / Cycling Australia women's road cycling program. He was women's road coach at the 2012 London Olympics and 2016 Rio Olympics.

In November 2017, he was appointed High Performance Director of Cycling New Zealand.

Barras resigned from Cycling NZ in 2021 after an integrity breach occurred regarding athlete selection for the Tokyo Olympics, accepting responsibility "for the conduct of the New Zealand Cycling Team at the Olympic Games".
