= Abi Van Twisk =

British cyclist (born 1997)

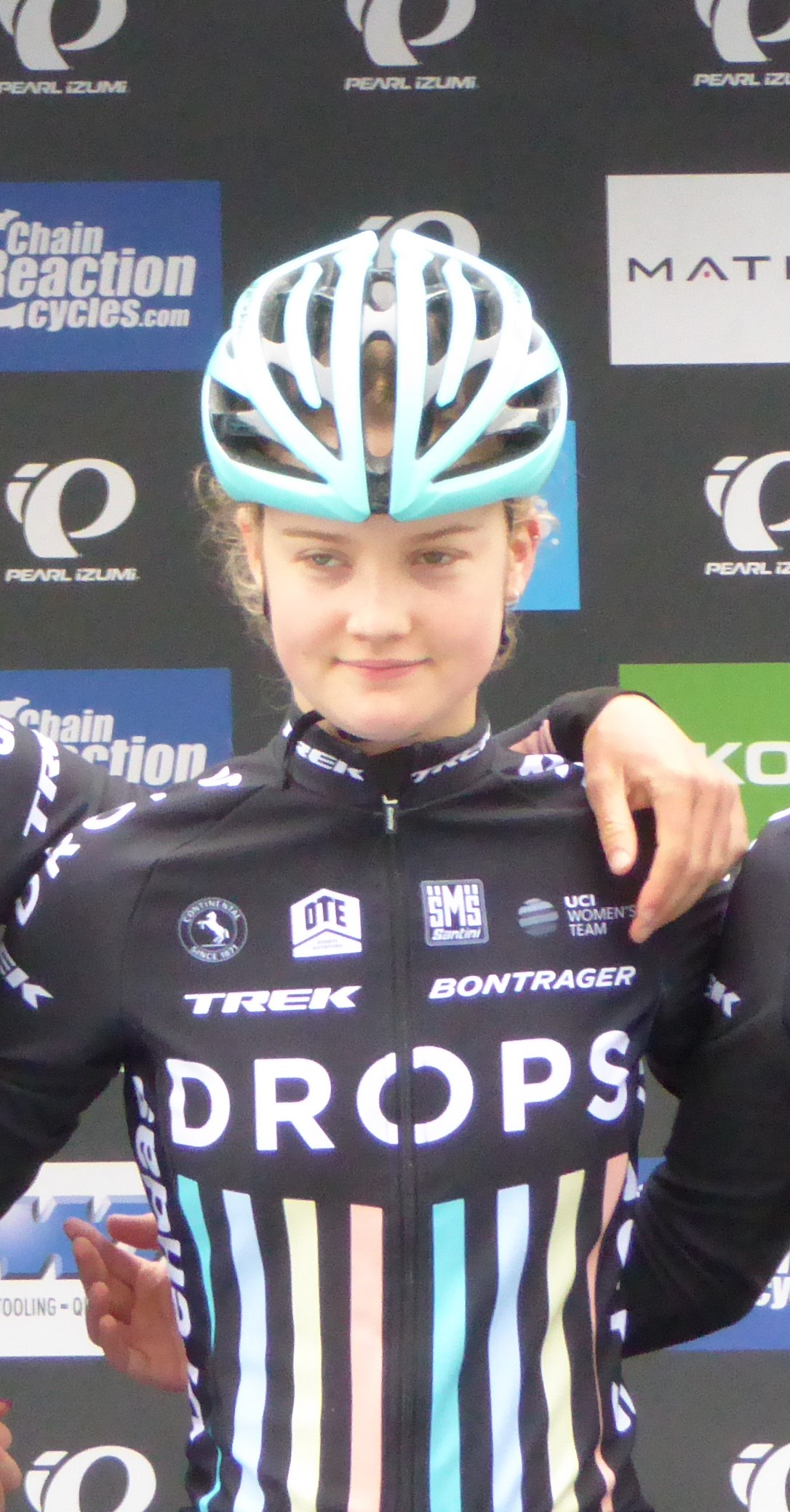
- Van Twisk in 2016.

Personal information
- Full name: Abigail Anna Van Twisk
- Born: 1 March 1997 (age 29) Lambeth, United Kingdom
- Height: 5 ft 7 in (171 cm)
- Weight: 53 kg (117 lb)

Cycling career
- Sport: Cycling
- Discipline: Road
- Role: Rider

Amateur team
- 2015: Corley Cycles–Drops RT

Professional teams
- 2016–2018: Drops
- 2019–2020: Trek–Segafredo

Abigail Anna Van Twisk (born 1 March 1997) is a British professional racing cyclist, who most recently rode for UCI Women's WorldTeam Trek–Segafredo. Prior to joining Trek–Segafredo in 2019, Van Twisk rode for the Corley Cycles–Drops RT/Drops team between 2015 and 2018. She competed in the road race at the 2018 Commonwealth Games in Gold Coast. She is coached by Tim Kennaugh. In September 2020, Trek–Segafredo announced that Van Twisk would go on maternity leave to give birth to her first child, due in February 2021.

== See also ==
- List of 2016 UCI Women's Teams and riders
