= Georgia Williams =

New Zealand cyclist (born 1993)

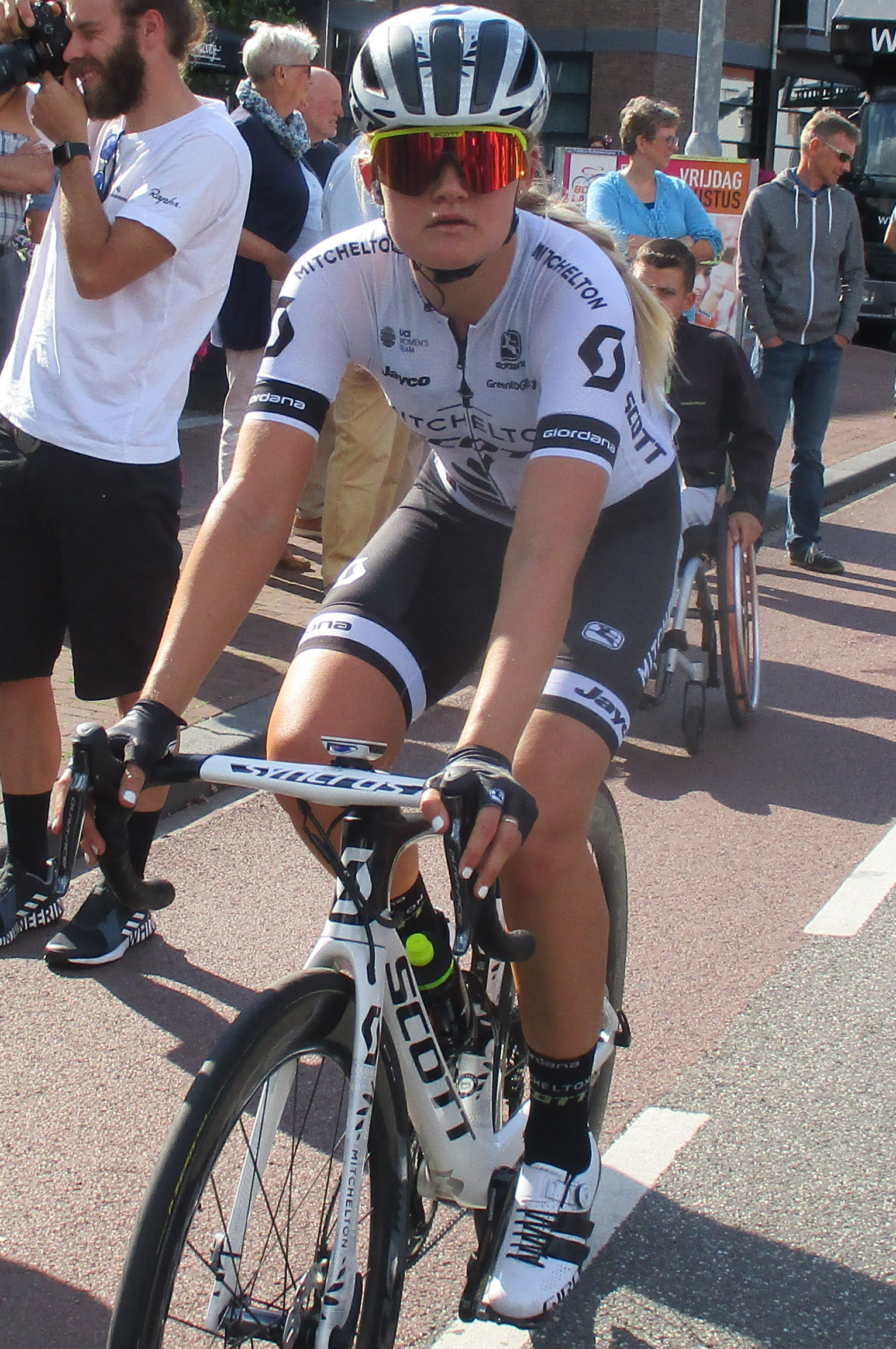
- Williams in 2018

Personal information
- Full name: Georgia Williams
- Born: 25 August 1993 (age 33) Takapuna, North Island, New Zealand
- Height: 170 cm (5 ft 7 in)

Cycling career
- Sport: Cycling
- Disciplines: Road; Track
- Role: Rider

Professional teams
- 2013–2016: Be Pink
- 2017–2022: Team BikeExchange–Jayco
- 2023: EF Education–Tibco–SVB

Major wins
- One-day races and Classics National Time trial Championships (2018, 2019, 2021, 2022) National Road race Championships (2018, 2021)
Medal record
Representing New Zealand
Women's road cycling
Commonwealth Games
Silver medal – second place	2018 Gold Coast	Road race

Georgia Williams (born 25 August 1993) is a retired New Zealand professional racing cyclist, who last rode for UCI Women's WorldTeam EF Education–Tibco–SVB.

== Career ==
She took up cycling whilst attending Albany Junior High School, where testing at the school's sports academy suggested that she was suited to the sport, having previously competed in netball and water polo.

She took two silver medals at the UCI Juniors Track World Championships: one in the team pursuit in 2010 and another in the individual pursuit in 2011. Williams joined the Be Pink team in 2013. She competed at the 2014 Commonwealth Games. In 2016, she was part of the New Zealand team pursuit squads that finished fourth at the UCI Track Cycling World Championships and the 2016 Summer Olympics. In February 2017 it was announced that Williams would join Orica–Scott for the 2017 season. She won New Zealand's second ever medal in the women's road race at a Commonwealth Games, a silver medal in 2018, after Susy Pryde at the 1998 Commonwealth Games.

== Major results ==
2009
1st Time trial, Oceania Junior Road Championships
2010
2nd Team pursuit, UCI Junior Track World Championships (with Alexandra Neems, and Elizabeth Steel)
2011
2nd Individual pursuit, UCI Junior Track World Championships
3rd Time trial, Oceania Junior Road Championships
2012
1st Criterium, National Road Championships
2013
National Road Championships

2nd Road race
3rd Time trial

1st Young rider classification Grand Prix Elsy Jacobs
1st Young rider classification Tour Languedoc Roussillon
5th Overall Giro del Trentino Alto Adige-Südtirol

1st Stage 1a (TTT)

8th Overall Thüringen Rundfahrt der Frauen
2014
Oceania Track Championships

1st Team pursuit (with Lauren Ellis, Jaime Nielsen and Racquel Sheath)
3rd Points race

2nd Points race, BikeNZ Classic
2016
2nd Road race, National Road Championships
2017
National Road Championships

2nd Time trial
2nd Road race

2018
National Road Championships

1st Time trial
1st Road race

2nd Road race, Commonwealth Games
4th Overall Emakumeen Euskal Bira
4th Tour of Guangxi Women's Elite World Challenge
5th Overall Women's Herald Sun Tour
6th Gooik–Geraardsbergen–Gooik
2019
1st Time trial, National Road Championships
2021
National Road Championships

1st Time trial
1st Road race

2022
1st Time trial, National Road Championships
