= Lucy Kennedy (cyclist) =

Australian cyclist

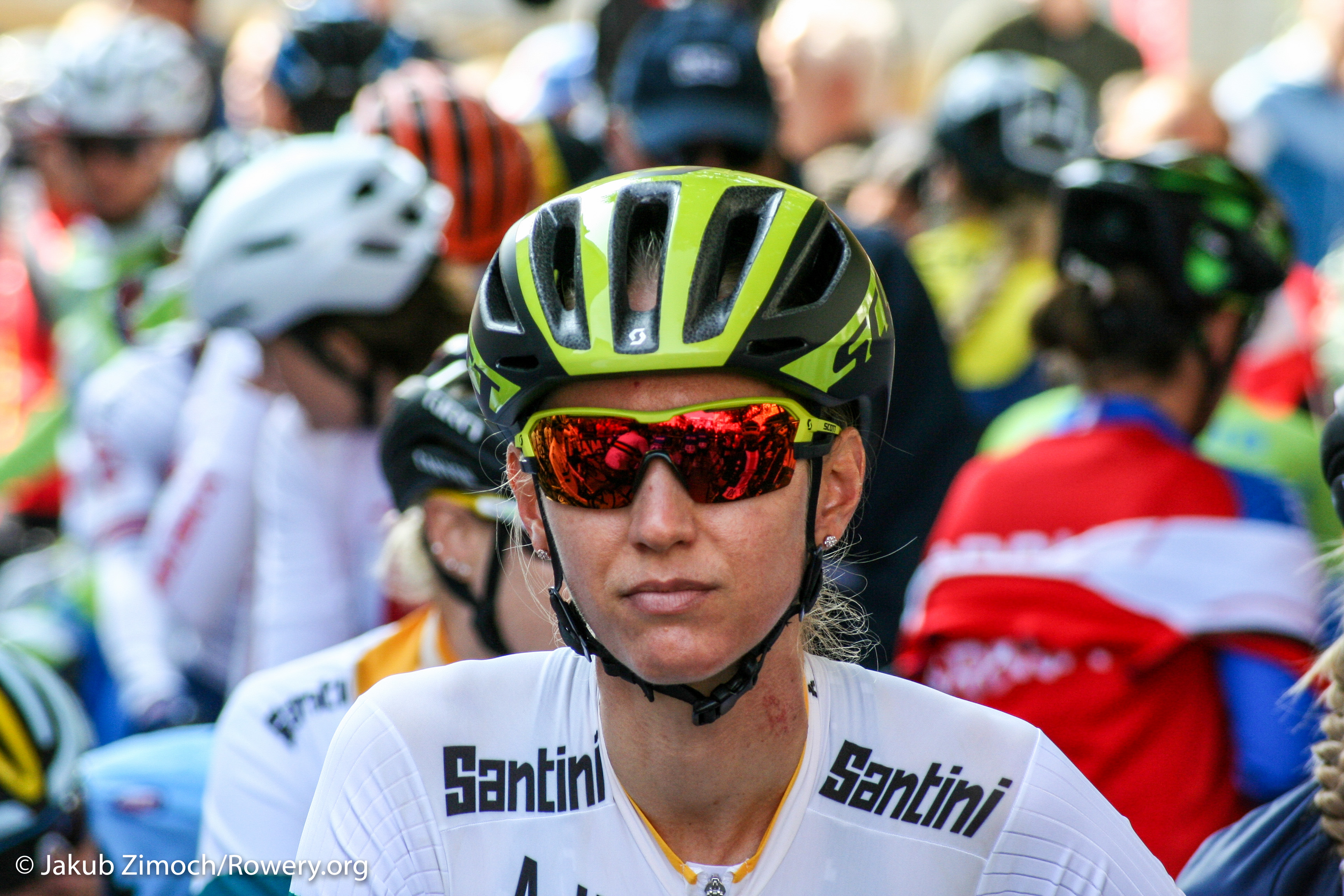
- Kennedy at the start of the 2018 UCI Road World Championships in Innsbruck

Personal information
- Full name: Lucy Kennedy
- Nickname: Goose
- Born: 11 July 1988 (age 38) Brisbane, Australia
- Height: 183 cm (6 ft 0 in)

Cycling career
- Sport: Cycling
- Current team: Team BikeExchange
- Discipline: Road
- Role: Rider
- Rider type: Climber; Time trialist

Amateur teams
- 2015: Lifecycle Cycling Club
- 2016–2017: High5 Dream Team
- 2017: High5 Australian Development Team

Professional team
- 2018–2021: Mitchelton–Scott

Lucy Kennedy (born 11 July 1988) is an Australian former racing cyclist, who last rode for UCI Women's WorldTeam Team BikeExchange.

A former triathlete, track and cross country runner, Kennedy was the recipient of the 2017 Amy Gillett Scholarship to do a European tour of races with the High5 Australian Development Team. She has degrees in Civil Engineering, and Commerce, working as a traffic modeller. Kennedy joined UCI Women's Team Mitchelton–Scott for the 2018 season.

In August 2021 she announced that she would retire from professional cycling at the end of the season.

== Major results ==
2016
4th Time trial, Oceania Road Championships
2017
Oceania Road Championships

1st Time trial
3rd Road race

1st Overall Tour de l'Ardèche

1st Sprints classification
1st Stage 6

3rd Road race, National Road Championships
2018
26th Taiwan KOM Challenge
2nd Time trial, National Road Championships
4th Overall Women's Tour Down Under
5th Strade Bianche
9th Trofeo Alfredo Binda-Comune di Cittiglio
2019
1st Overall Women's Herald Sun Tour

1st Mountains classification
1st Stage 2

1st Durango-Durango Emakumeen Saria
1st Donostia San Sebastian Klasikoa
2nd Overall Women's Tour Down Under
2nd Cadel Evans Great Ocean Road Race
2nd Emakumeen Nafarroako Klasikoa
2020
1st Overall Women's Herald Sun Tour
