= Profronde van Tiel =

Race details
- Region: Tiel, Netherlands
- Local name: Profronde van Tiel (in Dutch)
- Discipline: Road race
- Type: criterium
- Web site: www.sw-rivierenland.nl/profronde-tiel/

History
- First edition: 2011
- Final edition: 2017
- First winner: Men; Laurens Ten Dam (NED); Women; Marianne Vos (NED)
- Final winner: Men; Tom Dumoulin (NED); Women; Chantal Blaak (NED)

Profronde van Tiel (English: Proftour of Tiel) is an elite men's and women's professional road bicycle racing event held annually in Tiel, Netherlands after the Tour de France. Since 2013 the event also includes a women's race. In 2018 the organizers announced that the race would not be held in that year and would possibly not come back in the near future.

== Honours ==
=== Men's ===
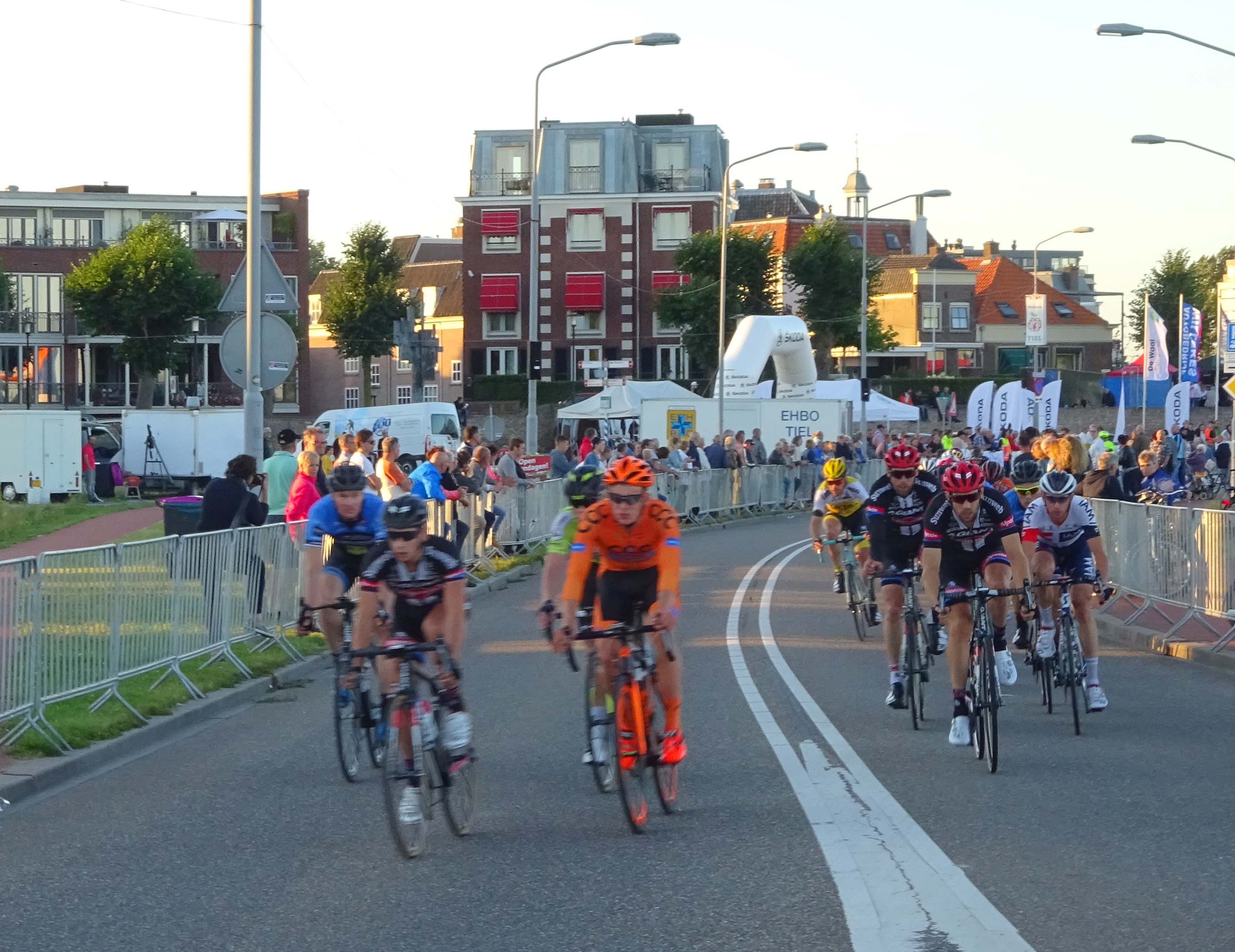
Race in 2016

Year	Winner	Second	Third
2011	(Netherlands) Laurens Ten Dam	(Netherlands) Johnny Hoogerland	(Netherlands) Rob Ruijgh
2012	(Netherlands) Karsten Kroon	(Netherlands) Laurens Ten Dam	(Netherlands) Kenny van Hummel
2013	(Netherlands) Johnny Hoogerland	(Netherlands) Bauke Mollema	(Netherlands) Bobbie Traksel
2014	(Netherlands) Laurens Ten Dam	(Netherlands) Sebastian Langeveld	(Netherlands) Lieuwe Westra
2015	(Netherlands) Bauke Mollema	(Netherlands) Lars Boom	(Netherlands) Wilco Kelderman
2016	(Netherlands) Wilco Kelderman	(Netherlands) Laurens Ten Dam	(Poland) Patryk Stosz
2017	(Netherlands) Tom Dumoulin	(Netherlands) Laurens Ten Dam	(Netherlands) Dylan Groenewegen

=== Women's ===
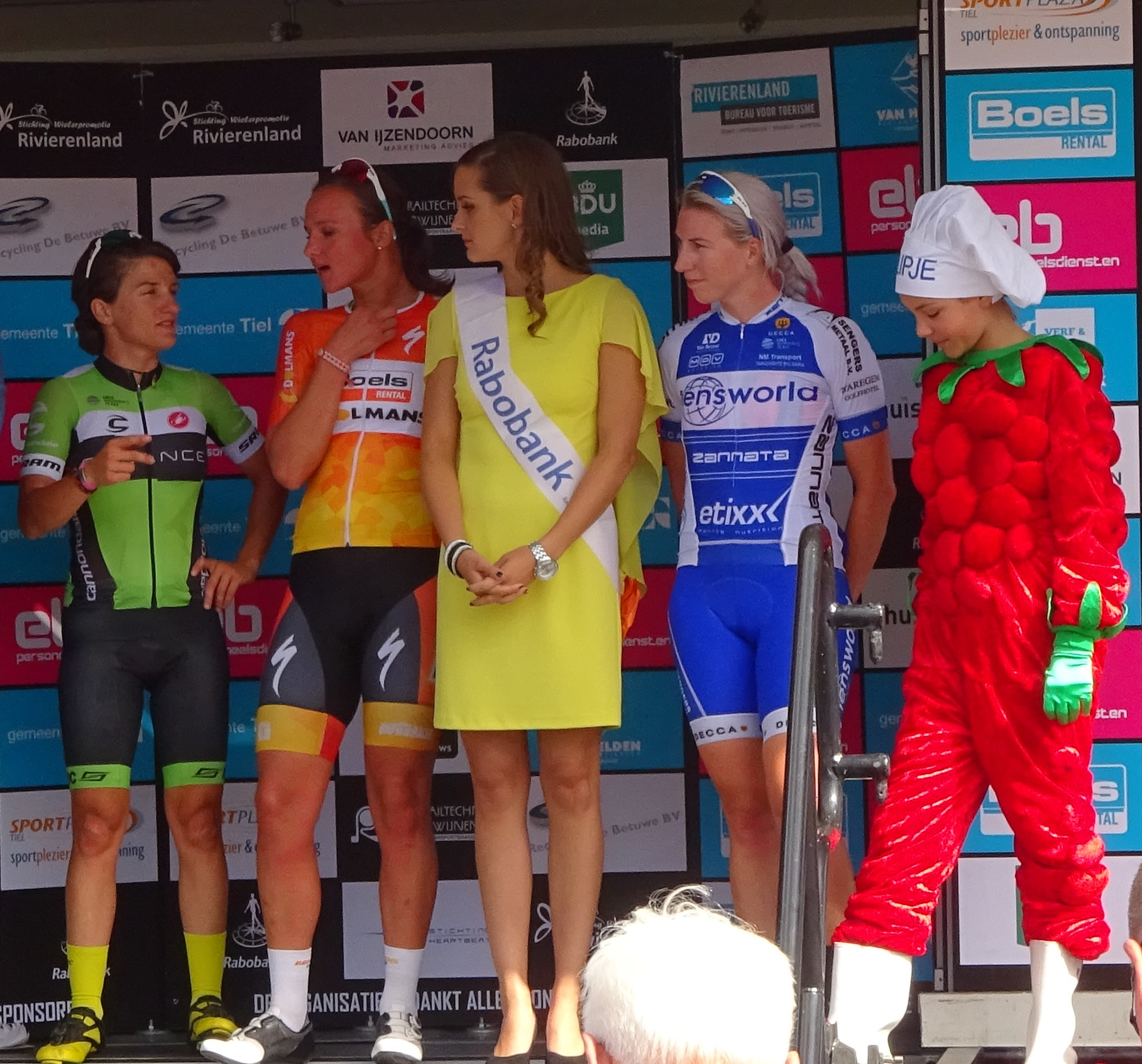
Podium in 2016

Year	Winner	Second	Third
2013	(Netherlands) Marianne Vos	(Netherlands) Lucinda Brand	(Netherlands) Ellen van Dijk
2014	(Netherlands) Anna van der Breggen	(Netherlands) Moniek Tenniglo	(Netherlands) Sandra van Veghel
2015	(Canada) Stephanie Roorda	(Netherlands) Eva Buurman	(Czech Republic) Jarmila Machačová
2016	(Netherlands) Chantal Blaak	(Netherlands) Nina Kessler	(Italy) Valentina Scandolara
2017	(Netherlands) Chantal Blaak	(Netherlands) Annemiek van Vleuten	(Netherlands) Anna van der Breggen
