= Daags na de Tour =

Bicycle race in Boxmeer, The Netherlands

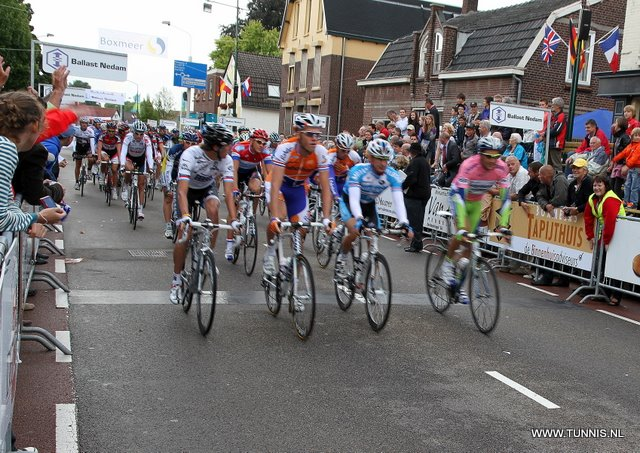
Daags na de Tour, 2010.

The Daags na de Tour (the former Ronde van Boxmeer) is a Criterium around the city of Boxmeer in The Netherlands. Traditionally the race will take place the day after the Tour de France.

== Winners ==
- 1975 Rik Van Linden
- 1978 Jan Krekels
- 1979 Gerrie Knetemann
- 1980 Gerrie Knetemann
- 1981 Ad Wijnands
- 1982 Henk Lubberding
- 1983 Peter Winnen
- 1984 Ad Wijnands
- 1985 Phil Anderson
- 1986 Eric Vanderaerden
- 1987 Adrie van der Poel
- 1988 Gert-Jan Theunisse
- 1989 Frans Maassen
- 1990 Adrie van der Poel
- 1991 Gianni Bugno
- 1992 Claudio Chiappucci
- 1993 Tony Rominger
- 1994 Jean-Paul van Poppel
- 1995 Maarten den Bakker
- 1996 Bart Voskamp
- 1997 Jan Ullrich
- 1998 Michael Boogerd
- 1999 Lance Armstrong
- 2000 Erik Dekker
- 2001 Erik Zabel
- 2004 Servais Knaven
- 2005 Michael Boogerd
- 2007 Michael Boogerd
- 2008 Koos Moerenhout
- 2009 Andy Schleck
- 2010 Lars Boom
- 2011 Lars Boom
- 2012 Vincenzo Nibali
- 2013 Bauke Mollema
- 2014 Lars Boom
- 2015 Wout Poels
- 2016 Bauke Mollema
- 2017 Dylan Groenewegen
- 2022 Mathieu Van Der Poel
- 2023 Jonas Vingegaard
