= Women's Herald Sun Tour =

Australian Cycling Race

Race details
- Date: January–February
- Region: Australia
- Discipline: Road
- Competition: UCI 2.2 (2018–)
- Type: Stage race

History
- First edition: 2018
- Editions: 3 (as of 2020)
- First winner: Brodie Chapman (AUS)
- Most wins: Lucy Kennedy (AUS) (2 wins)
- Most recent: Lucy Kennedy (AUS)

The Women's Herald Sun Tour is an annual professional road bicycle racing event for women in Australia. It is held in conjunction with the Herald Sun Tour.

== Winners ==
Year	Country	Rider	Team
2018	Australia	Brodie Chapman	Australia (national team)
2019	Australia	Lucy Kennedy	Mitchelton-Scott
2020	Australia	Lucy Kennedy	Mitchelton-Scott

== Classification leaders' jerseys ==
Classification	2018	2019	2020
General			
Sprints			
Mountains			
Youth			
Competitive			
