= Grace Anderson =

New Zealand cyclist

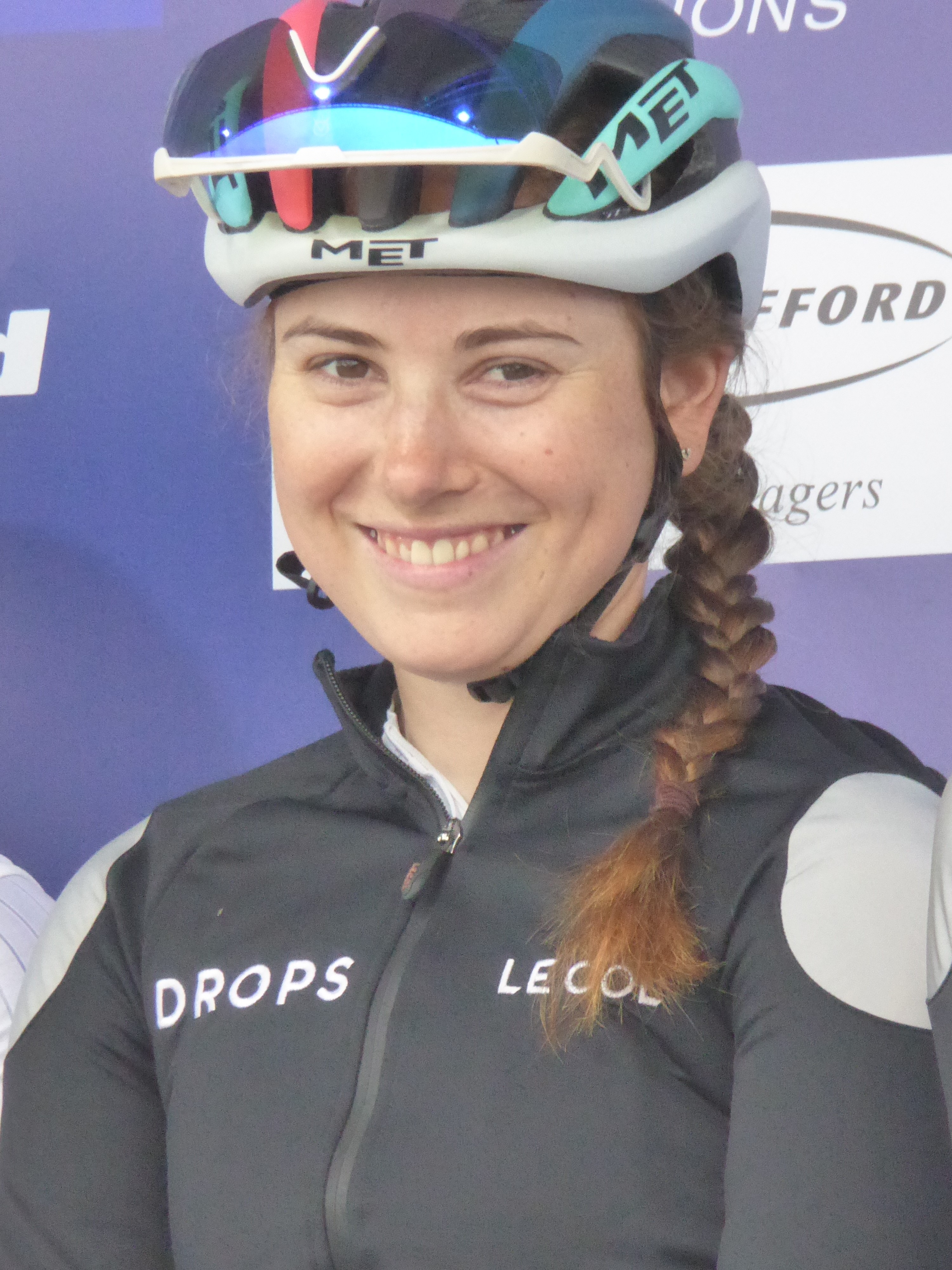
- Anderson at the 2019 Women's Tour of Scotland

Personal information
- Full name: Grace Anderson
- Born: 9 July 1997 (age 29)

Cycling career
- Sport: Cycling
- Current team: Retired
- Discipline: Road
- Role: Rider

Professional teams
- 2018: Team Illuminate
- 2019: Drops
- 2020: Bepink
- 2021: Andy Schleck–CP NVST–Immo Losch

Grace Anderson (born 9 July 1997) is a New Zealand former racing cyclist, who rode professionally between 2018 and 2021 for UCI Women's Teams Team Illuminate and Drops, and UCI Women's Continental Teams Bepink, and Andy Schleck–CP NVST–Immo Losch. She rode in the women's road race event at the 2018 UCI Road World Championships.

== Major results ==
2018
9th Women's Tour Down Under

1st Young rider classification
