= Brodie Chapman =

Australian cyclist (born 1991)

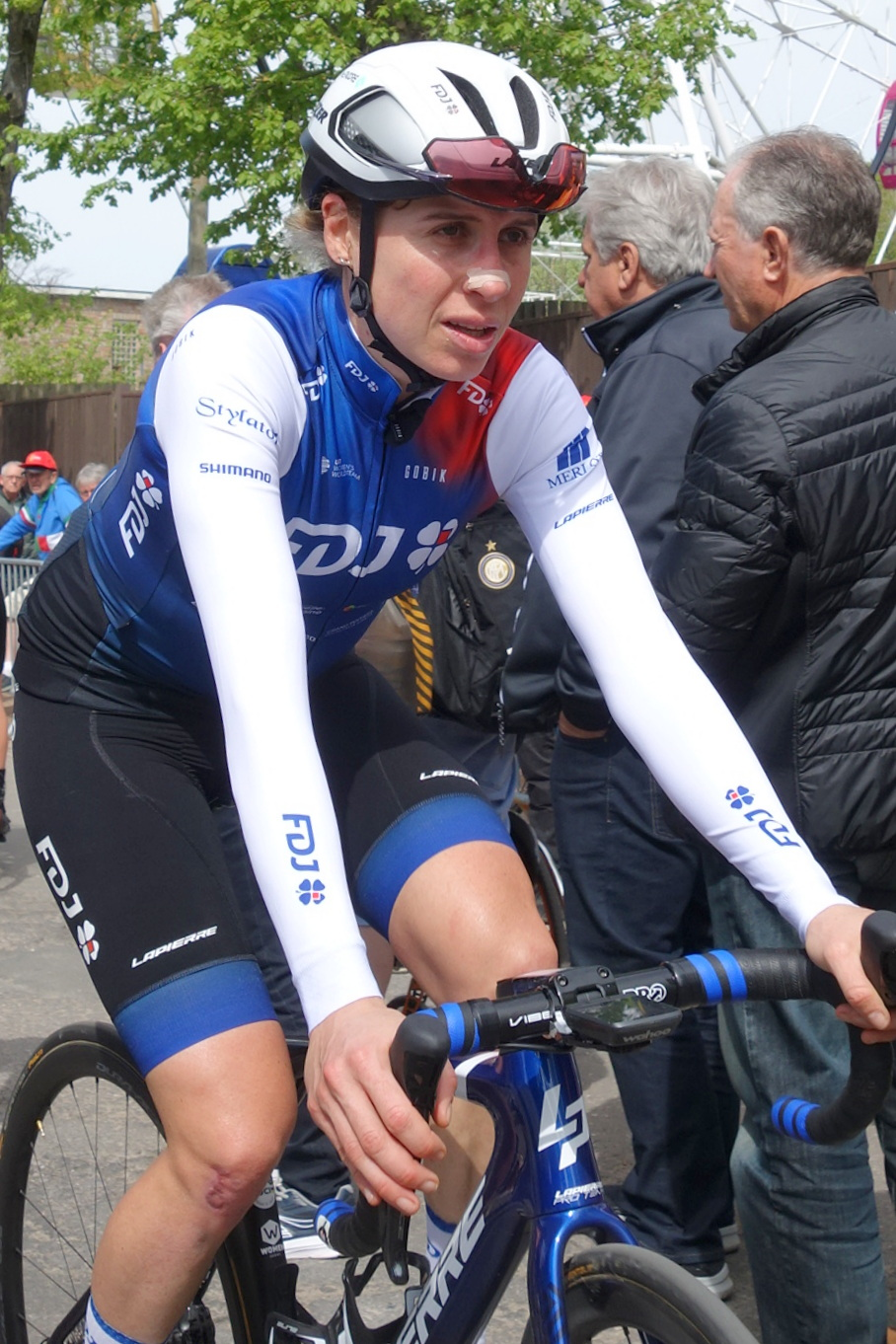
- Brodie Chapman in 2022

Personal information
- Full name: Brodie Mai Chapman
- Born: 9 April 1991 (age 35)
- Height: 1.72 m (5 ft 8 in)

Cycling career
- Sport: Cycling
- Current team: UAE Team ADQ
- Discipline: Road
- Role: Rider
- Rider type: Climber

Amateur teams
- 2017: CBR Women's Cycling (guest)
- 2018: Holden Team Gusto (guest)

Professional teams
- 2018–2019: Tibco–Silicon Valley Bank
- 2020–2022: FDJ Nouvelle-Aquitaine Futuroscope
- 2023–2024: Trek–Segafredo
- 2025–: UAE Team ADQ

Major wins
- One-day races and Classics National Road Race Championships (2023) National Time Trial Championships (2025)
Medal record
Women's road bicycle racing
Representing Australia
World Championships
Gold medal – first place	2024 Zurich	Mixed team relay
Gold medal – first place	2025 Kigali	Mixed team relay

Brodie Mai Chapman (born 9 April 1991) is an Australian road cyclist, who currently rides for UCI Women's WorldTeam UAE Team ADQ.

== Cycling career ==
Chapman competed in mountain bike events before transitioning to road racing. Sixth place at the Australian National Road Championships in 2018 led to her selection for the Herald Sun Tour. She won the first stage and the overall at the Herald Sun Tour. After this victory she joined Tibco–Silicon Valley Bank for the 2018 season. In 2019 Chapman won two stages, the Queen of the Mountains jersey and overall victory at the Tour of the Gila.

Chapman joined the French team FDJ Nouvelle-Aquitaine Futuroscope at the start of the 2020 season. She started the 2020 season with victory in the inaugural edition of Race Torquay. In 2023 she joined the Trek-Segafredo team and won the road race at the National Road Championships. Chapman has signed a two-year contract to join UAE Team ADQ in 2025.

== Major results ==
2016
2nd Overall Tour of the South West

1st Stage 3

3rd Baw Baw Classic
5th Overall Battle on the Border
2017
2nd Giro Della Donna
6th Overall Tour of East Gippsland
7th Subaru Australian Open Criterium
10th Shimano Super Criterium
2018
1st Overall Herald Sun Tour

1st Mountains classification
1st Stage 1

5th Overall Tour of California
2019
1st Overall Tour of the Gila

1st Mountains classification
1st Stages 1 & 5

1st Gravel and Tar
2nd Overall Colorado Classic
3rd Overall Herald Sun Tour
6th Cadel Evans Great Ocean Road Race
6th Overall Tour of California
9th La Flèche Wallonne
9th Overall Tour de Feminin - O cenu Českého Švýcarska

1st Stage 2

2020
1st Race Torquay
10th Cadel Evans Great Ocean Road Race
2021
6th Donostia San Sebastian Klasikoa
2022
1st Grand Prix Féminin de Chambéry
4th Tour de Suisse
8th Mont Ventoux Dénivelé Challenge
9th Tour of Flanders
9th Durango-Durango Emakumeen Saria
2023
1st Road race, National Road Championships
2024
1st Team relay, UCI Road World Championships
1st Stage 1 (TTT) La Vuelta Femenina
2nd Time trial, National Road Championships
3rd Overall Vuelta Extremadura
3rd Overall Thüringen Ladies Tour
7th Clasica Femenina Navarra
2025
1st UCI Road World Championships – Mixed team relay
1st Time trial, National Road Championships
4th UCI Road World Championships – Women's time trial
8th Overall Setmana Ciclista Valenciana

1st Mountains classification

Combativity award Stage 5 Tour de France
