= Katrin Garfoot =

Australian cyclist

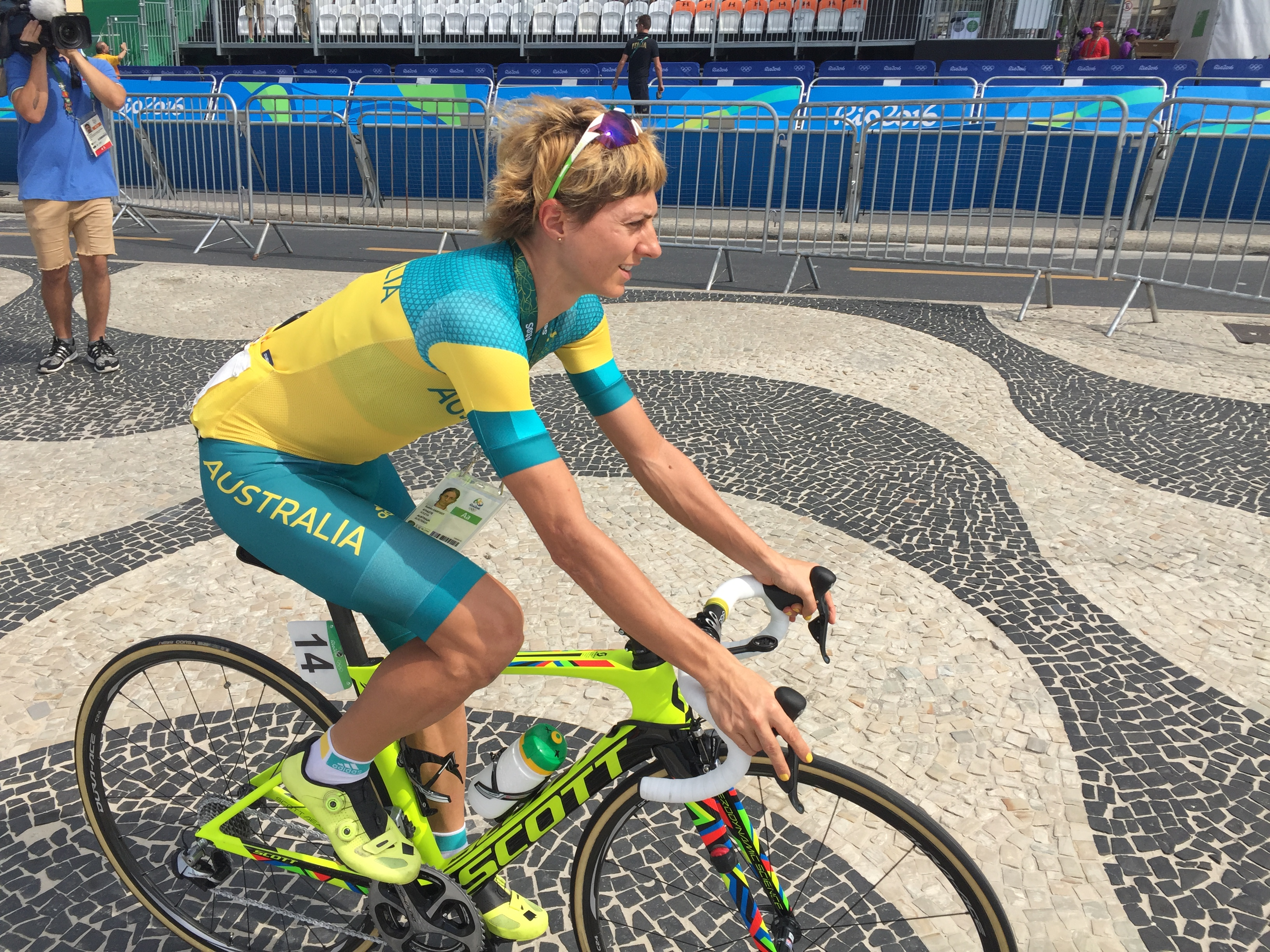
- Katrin Garfoot at the 2016 Rio Olympics Road Race

Personal information
- Born: 8 October 1981 (age 45) Eggenfelden, Germany
- Height: 1.66 m (5 ft 5 in)
- Weight: 55 kg (121 lb)

Cycling career
- Sport: Cycling
- Discipline: Road
- Role: Rider
- Rider type: Time trialist

Professional team
- 2014–2017: Orica–AIS

Major wins
- One day races & classics Oceania Road Race Champion (2013) Oceania Time Trial Champion (2015, 2016) National Time Trial Champion (2016, 2017), 2018) National Road Race Champion (2017)
Medal record
Representing Australia
Women's road cycling
World Championships
Silver medal – second place	2017 Bergen	Road race
Bronze medal – third place	2016 Doha	Time trial
Bronze medal – third place	2017 Bergen	Time trial
Commonwealth Games
Gold medal – first place	2018 Gold Coast	Time trial
Bronze medal – third place	2014 Glasgow	Time trial

Katrin Garfoot (born 8 October 1981) is a German-born Australian former cyclist who won a bronze medal at the 2014 Commonwealth Games in the road time trial. She started cycle racing in 2011, three years after moving to Australia, having previously competed in athletics up to junior level. In addition to this, Katrin was a teacher at Southport State High School on the Gold Coast.

At the 2016 UCI Road World Championships she won the bronze medal in the women's time trial, 8 seconds behind the winner Amber Neben. In the 2017 road world championships, Garfoot became the second Australian after Anna Wilson to achieve two individual medals at the same road world championships, with a bronze in the individual time trial and a silver in the road race. She completed the three-peat in the 2018 national time trial championships, two and a half minutes clear of second place over the 29.5 km course.

After three and a half years signed with the Orica–AIS UCI women's team, Garfoot confirmed that she would not re-sign with the Orica in 2018, choosing to focus on family life in Australia while keeping her local Commonwealth Games on the Gold Coast as a focus. In 2018, Katrin will represent the Queensland Academy of Sport on the road and in the velodrome, and was selected as a part of the Cycling Australia national team to race at UCI international road races in Australia.

On 12 July 2018, Garfoot announced her retirement from professional cycling.

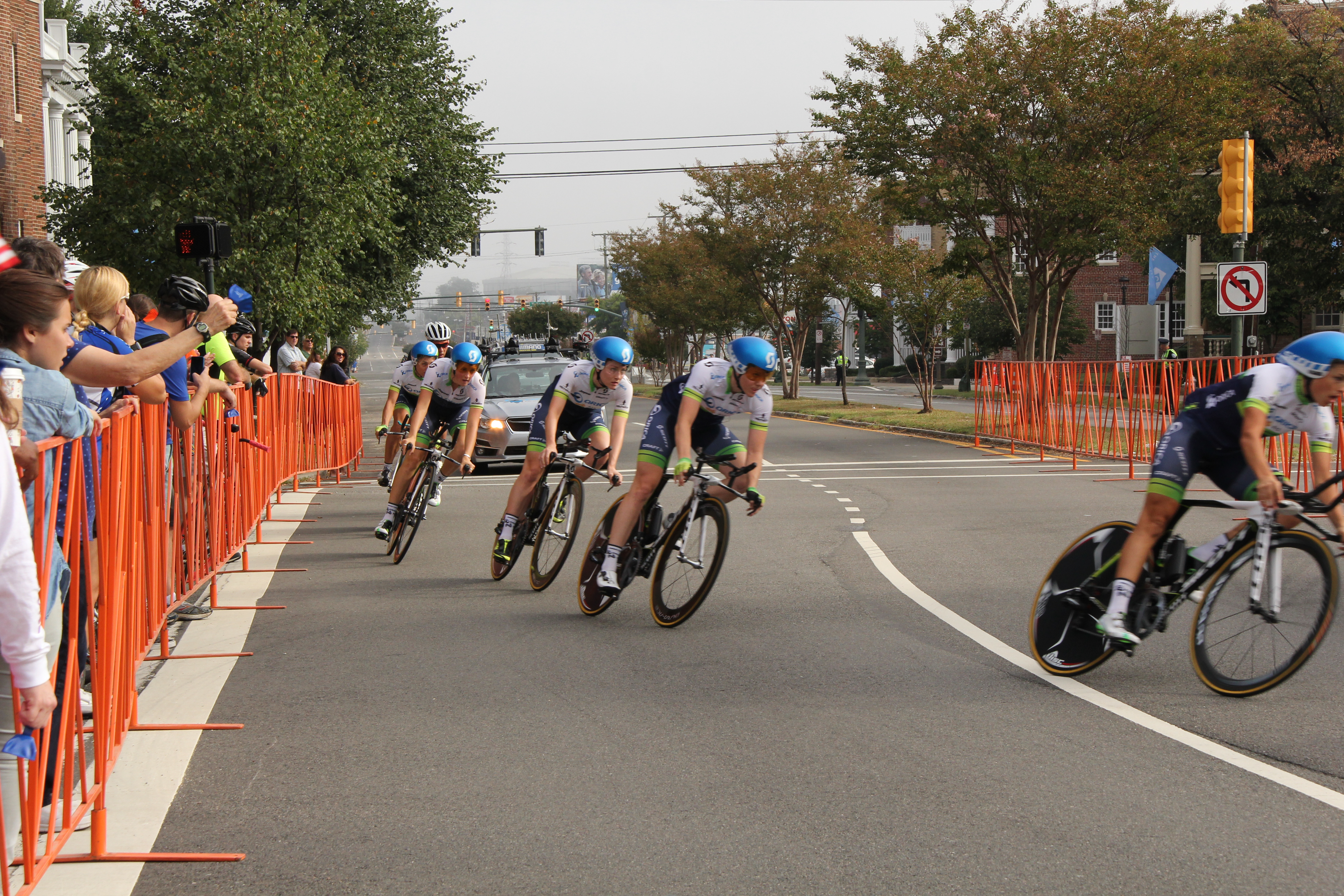
Riding with Orica–AIS at the 2015 UCI Road World Championships

== Major results ==
2012
2nd Overall Canberra Women's Tour
6th Overall Battle on the Border
7th Overall Santos North Western Tour
8th Noosa GP
2013
Oceania Road Cycling Championships

1st Road race
4th Time trial

1st Overall Tour of the Murray River

1st Stages 2 (ITT), 4 & 5

1st Overall Sam Miranda Tour of the King Valley

1st Stage 1

1st Overall Mersey Valley Tour
1st Noosa GP
2nd Overall Santos North West Tour

1st Stage 2

2nd Overall National Capital Tour
4th Overall Battle on the Border
6th Overall Tour of the Goldfields

1st Stages 1, 2 & 4

6th Overall Shipwreck Coast Classic

1st Stage 1 (ITT)

6th Overall Jarvis Subaru Adelaide Tour
2014
2nd Overall Gracia–Orlová
3rd Time trial, Commonwealth Games
National Road Championships

3rd Road race
4th Time trial

3rd Chrono Champenois
Oceania Road Cycling Championships

4th Time trial
5th Road race

4th Overall Tour of Zhoushan Island

1st Mountains classification

8th Giro del Trentino Alto Adige-Südtirol
2015
Oceania Road Cycling Championships

1st Time trial
3rd Road race

4th UCI Road World Championships – Women's time trial
4th Overall Festival Luxembourgeois du Cyclisme Féminin Elsy Jacobs
4th Giro del Trentino Alto Adige-Südtirol
5th Overall Emakumeen Euskal Bira
5th Durango-Durango Emakumeen Saria
6th Overall Women's Tour of New Zealand

1st Stage 3

7th UCI Road World Championships – Women's team time trial
7th Holland Hills Classic
8th Crescent Women World Cup Vårgårda TTT
2016
Oceania Road Cycling Championships

1st Time trial
4th Road race

National Road Championships

1st Time trial
4th Road race

1st Overall Women's Tour Down Under

1st Stage 1

1st Chrono Champenois
1st Launceston Cycling Classic
2nd Overall Grand Prix Elsy Jacobs
2nd Noosa GP
3rd UCI Road World Championships – Women's time trial
4th Overall Ladies Tour of Qatar

1st Stage 2

4th Overall Auensteiner–Radsporttage
4th Dwars door de Westhoek
6th Giro dell'Emilia Internazionale Donne Elite
8th GP de Plouay – Bretagne
8th La Flèche Wallonne Féminine
8th Holland Hills Classic
8th Time trial, Omloop van Borsele
9th Time trial, Olympic Games
2017
National Road Championships

1st Time trial
1st Road race

2nd UCI Road World Championships – Women's road race
3rd UCI Road World Championships – Women's time trial
3rd Overall Emakumeen Euskal Bira

1st Stage 3

4th Overall Ladies Tour of Norway
4th Durango-Durango Emakumeen Saria
7th Overall Women's Tour Down Under
7th Strade Bianche
9th La Flèche Wallonne Féminine
2018
1st Time trial, Commonwealth Games
National Road Championships

1st Time trial
5th Road race

2nd Team pursuit, National Track Championships
3rd Overall Women's Tour Down Under

1st Sprints classification
1st Stage 2

4th Overall Women's Herald Sun Tour

== See also ==
- 2014 Orica–AIS season
