= Shannon Malseed =

Australian professional cyclist

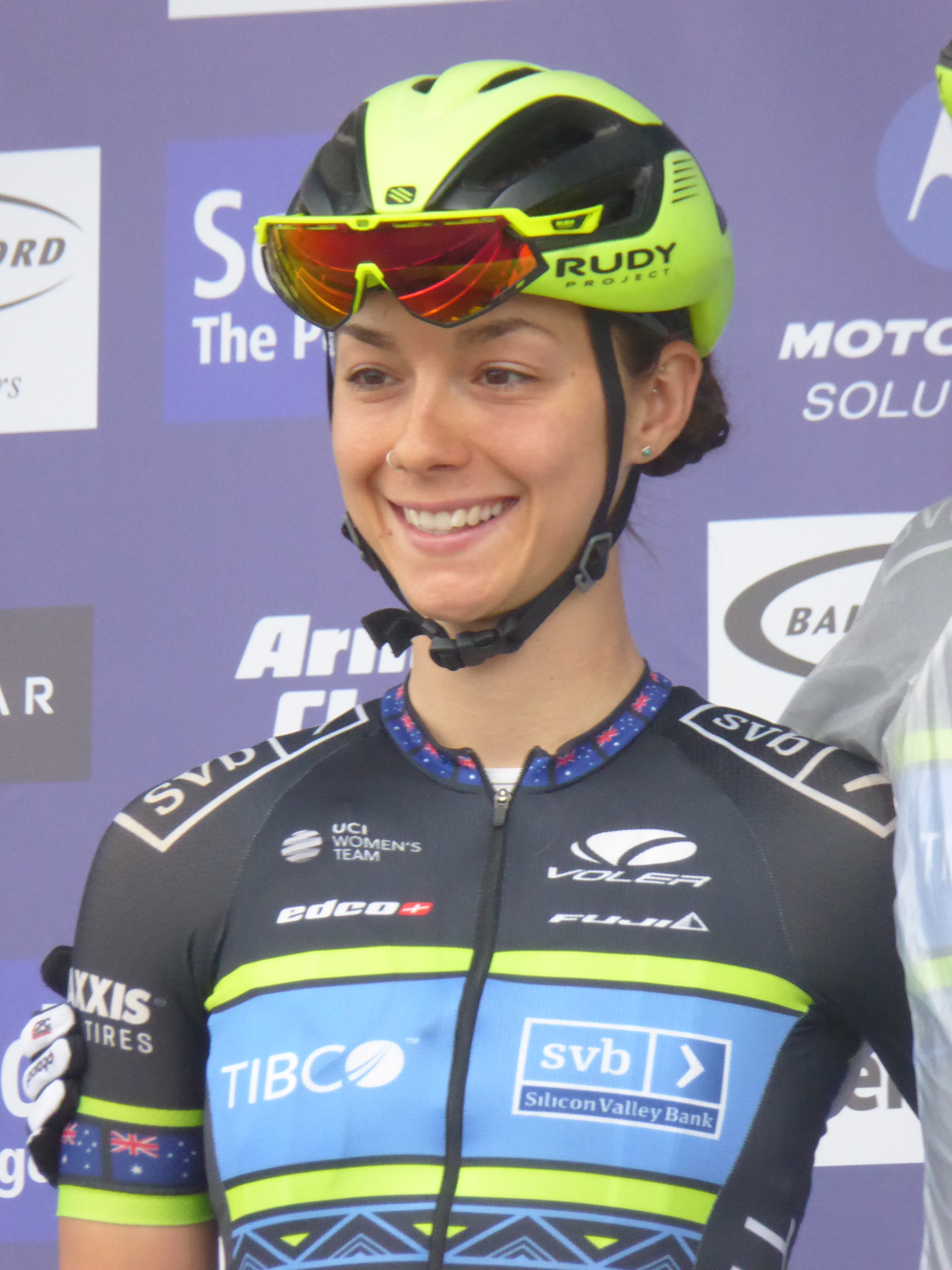
- Malseed at the 2019 Women's Tour of Scotland

Personal information
- Full name: Shannon Malseed
- Nicknames: Dash; Dachshund
- Born: 27 December 1994 (age 31) Narrawong, Victoria, Australia

Cycling career
- Sport: Cycling
- Discipline: Road
- Role: Rider

Amateur team
- 2013–2017: Holden Women's Cycling Team

Professional team
- 2018–2020: Tibco–Silicon Valley Bank

Major wins
- One day races & Classics Oceania Road Race Championships (2016) National Road Race Championships (2018)

Shannon Malseed (born 27 December 1994) is an Australian former professional racing cyclist, who rode professionally between 2018 and 2020 for the Tibco–Silicon Valley Bank team.

Malseed was victorious at the 2018 Australian National Road Race Championships in Ballarat, beating many race favorites and automatically qualifying a place for the 2018 Commonwealth Games. Malseed won the overall leader jersey for the 2017 Australian National Road Series (NRS), then racing for the highly successful domestic cycling team, Holden Women's Racing. Tibco–Silicon Valley Bank signed Malseed as a neo-pro for 2018 to race both in the United States and Europe.

At the start of the 2020 season, Malseed broke her scapula during Stage Two of the Bay Crits and missed the rest of the Australian part of the season. She announced her retirement from professional cycling at the end of the 2020 season.

== Major results ==
2015
National Under-23 Road Championships

1st Road race
1st Criterium

2016
1st Road race, Oceania Road Cycling Championships
2nd Criterium, National Under-23 Road Championships
5th White Spot / Delta Road Race
2017
2nd Road race, Oceania Road Cycling Championships
National Road Championships

3rd Criterium
4th Road race

2018
1st Road race, National Road Championships
2nd Overall Tour of Chongming Island
7th Overall Women's Tour Down Under
2019
2nd Overall Joe Martin Stage Race

1st Stage 2
