= Kate McIlroy =

New Zealand triathlete and distance runner (born 1981)

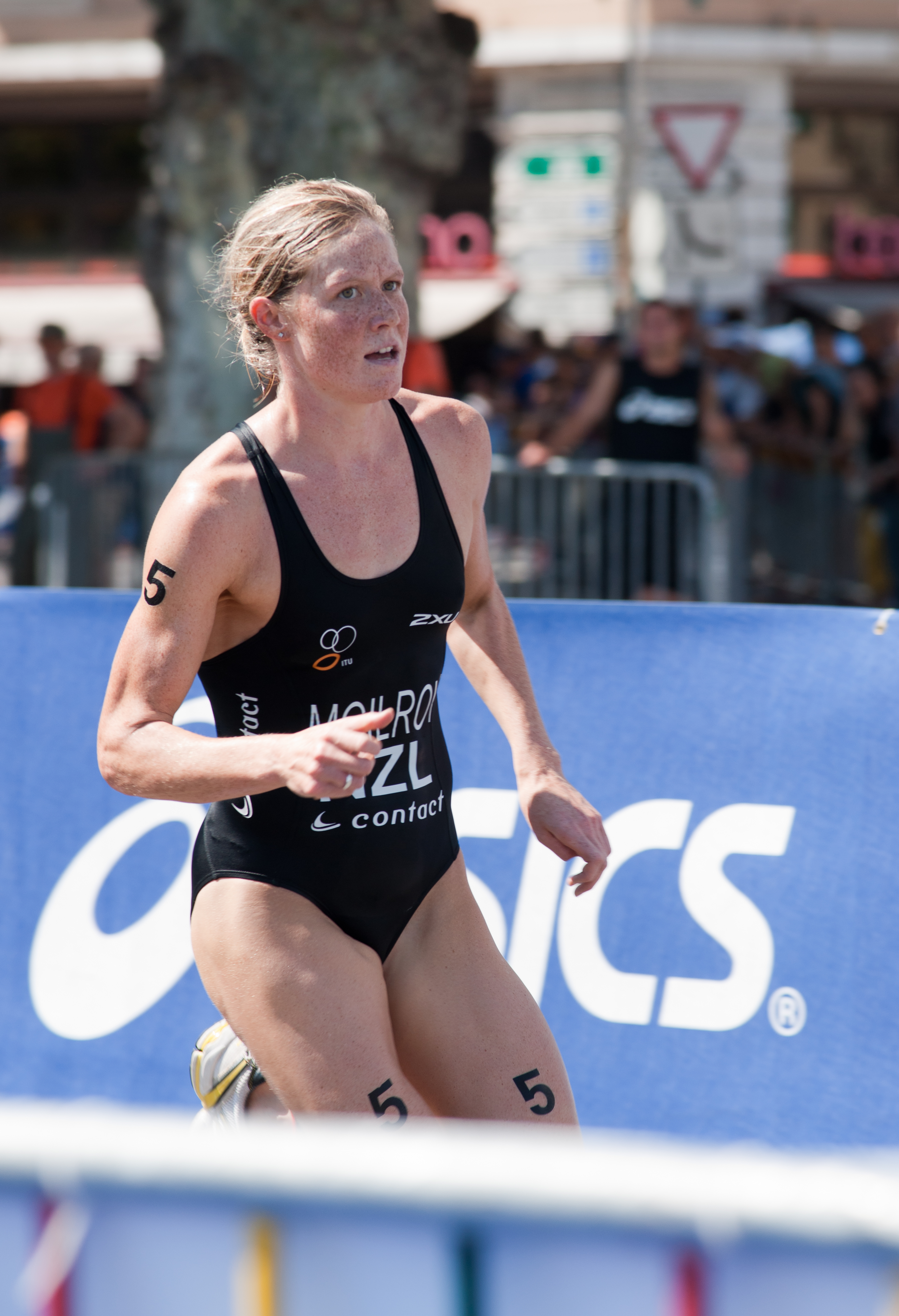
- Kate McIlroy competing in 2010

Personal information
- Born: 26 August 1981 (age 45) Wellington
- Height: 173 cm (5 ft 8 in)
- Weight: 57 kg (126 lb)

Sport
- Country: New Zealand

Kate McIlroy (born 26 August 1981) is a New Zealand cyclist, triathlete and former runner. She won the World Mountain Running title in 2005 and was later named New Zealand Sportswoman of the Year at the Halberg Awards.

She is the national women's record holder for the 3000 metre steeplechase with a time of 9:32.54 set in Heusden, Belgium during 2006.

McIlroy converted to track in a bid to compete at the 2008 Beijing Olympics, but sustained a leg injury and was unable recover in time.

She started competing in triathlons at the end of 2008. In 2012, she was selected to compete at the 2012 Summer Olympics in the triathlon, where she finished in 10th place.

In 2019 and 2021 McIlroy won the New Zealand national championships cyclo-cross.

== Achievements ==
- 2021: New Zealand cyclo-cross champion
- 2019: New Zealand cyclo-cross champion
- 2019: 3rd woman in the Taiwan KOM Challenge
- 2017: 3rd place New Zealand Elite Road Cycling Nationals in Napier
- 2017: 30th place, Cadel Evans Great Ocean Road Race
- 2016: First female to go under 4 hours at the Taupo Road Race
- 2014: 12th place in triathlon at the Glasgow Commonwealth Games
- 2012: Placed 10th in the 2012 London Olympics Triathlon.
- 2012: 3rd place New Zealand Elite Road Cycling Nationals in Christchurch
- 2009: Started competing in triathlon, winning a World Cup race in Hungary.
- 2006: Represented New Zealand at the Commonwealth Games, finishing fifth in the 3000m steeplechase.
- 2005: Won World Mountain Running champs in Wellington,
- 2005: Named New Zealand Sportswomen of the Year at the Halberg Awards.
- 1997: Named New Zealand Junior Athlete of the Year.

Awards
Preceded by Sarah Ulmer	New Zealand's Sportswoman of the Year; 2005	Succeeded by Valerie Adams
