= Cycling New Zealand =

Name of peak body for cycling in New Zealand

Cycling New Zealand Māori: Eke Paihikara Aotearoa
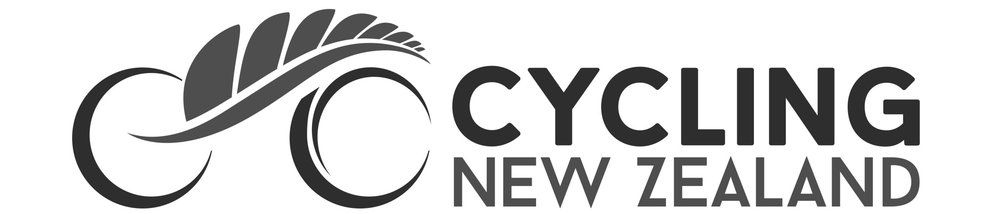
- Sport: Cycling
- Jurisdiction: New Zealand
- Abbreviation: CNZ
- Founded: 1 July 2003
- Affiliation: UCI
- Affiliation date: 1 July 2003
- Regional affiliation: OCC
- Affiliation date: 1 July 2003
- Headquarters: Cambridge, New Zealand
- Chairperson: Martin Snedden CNZM
- CEO: Simon Peterson

Official website
- www.cyclingnewzealand.nz
- (New Zealand)

Cycling New Zealand (Māori: Eke Paihikara Aotearoa), originally known as BikeNZ, is the national governing body for cycling organisations in New Zealand, and represents the interests of BMX NZ, Cycling New Zealand Road & Track, Mountain Bike NZ, and Cycling New Zealand Schools (formerly NZ Schools Cycling Association). Cycling New Zealand covers the disciplines of road, track, mountain bike, cyclo-cross, BMX, BMX freestyle, e-cycling sports and para-cycling.

Cycling New Zealand was established in July 2003 and is a member of the Union Cycliste Internationale (UCI) and the Oceania Cycling Confederation (OCC). It is also recognised by the New Zealand Government, the New Zealand Olympic Committee, and the New Zealand Paralympic Committee.

Cycling New Zealand's mission is to ensure cyclists of every age and ability are given the opportunity to participate, develop, compete and perform at the level they aspire to.

== BikeNZ ==
BikeNZ logo

From November 2008 until December 2012, Rabobank New Zealand was the principal sponsor of BikeNZ. After the sponsorship arrangement expired, BikeNZ got close to becoming insolvent. Under its new chief executive officer, Andrew Matheson, BikeNZ was rebranded as Cycling New Zealand in December 2014.

== Association with Cycling Action Network ==
Cycling Action Network (CAN), formerly known as Cycling Advocates' Network, another New Zealand cycling organisation, was one of the founding members of BikeNZ and provided one board member from BikeNZ's inception in July 2003. CAN resigned from BikeNZ in October 2007 over disagreements in the focus of BikeNZ's work, but has continued to work with BikeNZ on advocacy issues.

== Inquiries into Cycling New Zealand ==
In 2018, former New Zealand solicitor-general, Michael Heron KC headed an inquiry into Cycling New Zealand following allegations of bullying, intimidation, an inappropriate personal relationship, a dysfunctional culture, a drinking culture, and a lack of accountability. Heron's independent review found there was a dysfunctional culture within Cycling NZ's high performance programme from 2016 until early 2018. Heron found that there had been bullying, but the broad consensus was that it was concentrated around a coach, and there was no evidence of "a widespread, systemic culture of bullying". He was satisfied that a coach and an athlete had an inappropriate relationship. He found there had been a dysfunctional culture, but not a drinking culture, save for a few individuals, the coach being one of them. He found there had been a lack of accountability at Cycling NZ.

Following the 2021 sudden death of Olivia Podmore, CNZ and High Performance Sport New Zealand (HPSNZ) appointed Herron and Professor Sarah Leberman MNZM to co-chair an inquiry. Also sitting on the panel are Dr Lesley Nicol ONZM and rowing Olympic medalist, Genevieve Macky. The terms of reference of the inquiry included:

1. assessing the adequacy of the implementation of the recommendations from the 2018 Heron Report; identification of areas of further improvement that would ensure the wellbeing of athletes, coaches, support staff and others involved in Cycling New Zealand’s high performance programme are a top priority within the environment
2. assessment of the support offered to athletes at critical points within Cycling New Zealand’s high performance programme (by both Cycling New Zealand and HPSNZ), with a particular emphasis on induction, selection and exit transitions;
3. assessment of the impact that HPSNZ investment and engagement has on Cycling New Zealand’s high performance programme;
4. assessment of the impacts of high performance programmes which require elite athletes to be in one location for most of the year, with a particular focus on Cambridge; and
5. an understanding of what steps can be taken to improve current and future practices, policies and governance of Cycling New Zealand’s high performance programme with a view to ensuring the safety, wellbeing and empowerment of all individuals within that environment.

An independent investigation into Cycling New Zealand's handling of athlete selection for the 2020 Olympics uncovered the breach of both Olympic and international cycling regulations. The investigation revealed that the process to replace an athlete during an event in Tokyo didn't respect IOC and UCI rules. High Performance Director Martin Barras resigned after confirmation of an "integrity breach" during the Tokyo Olympics. Jacques Landry, the Chief Executive Officer, also resigned.

== See also ==
- Cycling in New Zealand
