= 2020 Women's Tour Down Under =

2020 UCI Women's ProSeries, race 1 of 7

Race details
- Dates: 16–19 January 2020
- Stages: 4
- Distance: 382.8 km (237.9 mi)
- Winning time: 10h 11' 07"

Results
Jersey awarded to the overall winner	Winner	Ruth Edwards (USA)	(Trek–Segafredo)
	Second	Liane Lippert (GER)	(Team Sunweb)
	Third	Amanda Spratt (AUS)	(Mitchelton–Scott)
Jersey awarded to the mountains classification winner	Mountains	Liane Lippert (GER)	(Team Sunweb)
Jersey awarded to the young rider classification winner	Young rider	Liane Lippert (GER)	(Team Sunweb)
Jersey awarded to the sprints classification winner	Sprints	Leah Kirchmann (CAN)	(Team Sunweb)
	Team	Team Sunweb	

The 2020 Women's Tour Down Under (officially Santos Women's Tour Down Under 2020 for sponsorship reasons) was a women's cycle stage race held in Australia from 16 to 19 January. It was the fifth edition of the Women's Tour Down Under. It was also part of the 2020 UCI Women's ProSeries for the first time.

The race was won by American rider Ruth Edwards of Trek–Segafredo.

== Teams ==
Six UCI Women's WorldTeams, seven UCI Women's Continental Teams, two national teams and one amateur team participated in the race.

UCI Women's WorldTeams

- Alé BTC Ljubljana
- Canyon//SRAM
- FDJ Nouvelle-Aquitaine Futuroscope
- Mitchelton–Scott
- Team Sunweb
- Trek–Segafredo

UCI Women's Continental Teams

- Agolíco–BMC–PatoBike
- Astana
- Bepink
- Doltcini–Van Eyck Sport
- Rally Cycling
- Roxsolt Attaquer
- Tibco–Silicon Valley Bank

Other Teams

- Australia
- New Zealand
- Specialized Women's Racing

== Route ==
List of stages
Stage	Date	Course	Distance	Type	Winner	Team
1	16 January	Hahndorf to Macclesfield	116.3 km (72.3 mi)	Hilly stage	Chloe Hosking (AUS)	Rally Cycling
2	17 January	Murray Bridge to Birdwood	114.9 km (71.4 mi)	Hilly stage	Amanda Spratt (AUS)	Mitchelton–Scott
3	18 January	Nairne to Stirling	109.1 km (67.8 mi)	Hilly stage	Ruth Edwards (USA)	Trek–Segafredo
4	19 January	Adelaide to Adelaide	42.5 km (26.4 mi)	Flat stage	Simona Frapporti (ITA)	Bepink
Total			382.8 km (237.9 mi)			

== Stages ==
=== Stage 1 ===
16 January — Hahndorf to Macclesfield, 116.3 km (72.3 mi)

Stage 1 Result
Rank	Rider	Team	Time
1	Chloe Hosking (AUS)	Rally Cycling	3h 17' 02"
2	Lotta Henttala (FIN)	Trek–Segafredo	+ 0"
3	Matilda Raynolds (AUS)	Specialized Women's Racing	+ 0"
4	Gracie Elvin (AUS)	Mitchelton–Scott	+ 0"
5	Peta Mullens (AUS)	Roxsolt Attaquer	+ 0"
6	Leah Kirchmann (CAN)	Team Sunweb	+ 0"
7	Liane Lippert (GER)	Team Sunweb	+ 0"
8	Lauren Kitchen (AUS)	FDJ Nouvelle-Aquitaine Futuroscope	+ 0"
9	Arlenis Sierra (CUB)	Astana	+ 0"
10	Alexis Magner (USA)	Canyon//SRAM	+ 0"

General classification after Stage 1
Rank	Rider	Team	Time
1	Chloe Hosking (AUS)	Rally Cycling	3h 16' 51"
2	Lotta Henttala (FIN)	Trek–Segafredo	+ 4"
3	Leah Kirchmann (CAN)	Team Sunweb	+ 6"
4	Matilda Raynolds (AUS)	Specialized Women's Racing	+ 7"
5	Gracie Elvin (AUS)	Mitchelton–Scott	+ 8"
6	Brodie Chapman (AUS)	FDJ Nouvelle-Aquitaine Futuroscope	+ 8"
7	Nina Kessler (NED)	Tibco–Silicon Valley Bank	+ 9"
8	Anastasiia Chursina	Alé BTC Ljubljana	+ 9"
9	Juliette Berthet (FRA)	Team Sunweb	+ 10"
10	Peta Mullens (AUS)	Roxsolt Attaquer	+ 11"

=== Stage 2 ===
17 January — Murray Bridge to Birdwood, 114.9 km (71.4 mi)

Stage 2 Result
Rank	Rider	Team	Time
1	Amanda Spratt (AUS)	Mitchelton–Scott	3h 04' 27"
2	Ruth Edwards (USA)	Trek–Segafredo	+ 0"
3	Liane Lippert (GER)	Team Sunweb	+ 0"
4	Grace Brown (AUS)	Mitchelton–Scott	+ 2"
5	Jaime Gunning (AUS)	Specialized Women's Racing	+ 13"
6	Peta Mullens (AUS)	Roxsolt Attaquer	+ 15"
7	Rachel Neylan (AUS)	Australia	+ 18"
8	Ella Harris (NZL)	Canyon//SRAM	+ 18"
9	Shara Marche (AUS)	FDJ Nouvelle-Aquitaine Futuroscope	+ 18"
10	Juliette Berthet (FRA)	Team Sunweb	+ 18"

General classification after Stage 2
Rank	Rider	Team	Time
1	Amanda Spratt (AUS)	Mitchelton–Scott	6h 21' 19"
2	Ruth Edwards (USA)	Trek–Segafredo	+ 4"
3	Liane Lippert (GER)	Team Sunweb	+ 5"
4	Grace Brown (AUS)	Mitchelton–Scott	+ 12"
5	Chloe Hosking (AUS)	Rally Cycling	+ 21"
6	Jaime Gunning (AUS)	Specialized Women's Racing	+ 23"
7	Leah Kirchmann (CAN)	Team Sunweb	+ 24"
8	Peta Mullens (AUS)	Roxsolt Attaquer	+ 25"
9	Juliette Berthet (FRA)	Team Sunweb	+ 27"
10	Shara Marche (AUS)	FDJ Nouvelle-Aquitaine Futuroscope	+ 28"

=== Stage 3 ===
18 January — Nairne to Stirling, 109.1 km (67.8 mi)

Stage 3 Result
Rank	Rider	Team	Time
1	Ruth Edwards (USA)	Trek–Segafredo	2h 51' 16"
2	Liane Lippert (GER)	Team Sunweb	+ 0"
3	Lauren Stephens (USA)	Tibco–Silicon Valley Bank	+ 0"
4	Peta Mullens (AUS)	Roxsolt Attaquer	+ 0"
5	Chloe Hosking (AUS)	Rally Cycling	+ 0"
6	Anastasiia Chursina	Alé BTC Ljubljana	+ 0"
7	Ella Harris (NZL)	Canyon//SRAM	+ 0"
8	Shara Marche (AUS)	FDJ Nouvelle-Aquitaine Futuroscope	+ 0"
9	Rachel Neylan (AUS)	Australia	+ 0"
10	Amanda Spratt (AUS)	Mitchelton–Scott	+ 0"

General classification after Stage 3
Rank	Rider	Team	Time
1	Ruth Edwards (USA)	Trek–Segafredo	9h 12' 26"
2	Liane Lippert (GER)	Team Sunweb	+ 7"
3	Amanda Spratt (AUS)	Mitchelton–Scott	+ 7"
4	Chloe Hosking (AUS)	Rally Cycling	+ 30"
5	Leah Kirchmann (CAN)	Team Sunweb	+ 33"
6	Peta Mullens (AUS)	Roxsolt Attaquer	+ 34"
7	Lauren Stephens (USA)	Tibco–Silicon Valley Bank	+ 34"
8	Juliette Berthet (FRA)	Team Sunweb	+ 36"
9	Shara Marche (AUS)	FDJ Nouvelle-Aquitaine Futuroscope	+ 37"
10	Ella Harris (NZL)	Canyon//SRAM	+ 37"

=== Stage 4 ===
19 January — Adelaide to Adelaide, 42.5 km (26.4 mi)

Stage 4 Result
Rank	Rider	Team	Time
1	Simona Frapporti (ITA)	Bepink	58" 32'
2	Lauren Stephens (USA)	Tibco–Silicon Valley Bank	+ 0"
3	Rushlee Buchanan (NZL)	New Zealand	+ 0"
4	Leigh Ann Ganzar (USA)	Rally Cycling	+ 0"
5	Jaime Gunning (AUS)	Specialized Women's Racing	+ 0"
6	Katia Ragusa (ITA)	Astana	+ 0"
7	Brodie Chapman (AUS)	FDJ Nouvelle-Aquitaine Futuroscope	+ 0"
8	Jessica Pratt (AUS)	Canyon//SRAM	+ 0"
9	Georgia Williams (NZL)	Mitchelton–Scott	+ 0"
10	Tatiana Guderzo (ITA)	Alé BTC Ljubljana	+ 0"

General classification after Stage 4
Rank	Rider	Team	Time
1	Ruth Edwards (USA)	Trek–Segafredo	10h 11' 07"
2	Liane Lippert (GER)	Team Sunweb	+ 5"
3	Amanda Spratt (AUS)	Mitchelton–Scott	+ 6"
4	Lauren Stephens (USA)	Tibco–Silicon Valley Bank	+ 17"
5	Chloe Hosking (AUS)	Rally Cycling	+ 30"
6	Leah Kirchmann (CAN)	Team Sunweb	+ 32"
7	Andrea Ramírez (MEX)	Agolíco–BMC–PatoBike	+ 33"
8	Katia Ragusa (ITA)	Astana	+ 34"
9	Jessica Pratt (AUS)	Canyon//SRAM	+ 34"
10	Peta Mullens (AUS)	Roxsolt Attaquer	+ 35"

== Classification leadership table ==
In the 2020 Women's Tour Down Under, four different jerseys were awarded. For the general classification, calculated by adding each cyclist's finishing times on each stage, and allowing time bonuses for the first three finishers at intermediate sprints and at the finish of mass-start stages, the leader received an ochre jersey. This classification was considered the most important of the 2020 Women's Tour Down Under, and the winner of the classification was considered the winner of the race.

Stage	Winner	General classification	Mountains classification	Sprint classification	Young rider classification	Team classification
1	Chloe Hosking	Chloe Hosking	Marieke van Witzenburg	Chloe Hosking	Juliette Labous	Team Sunweb
2	Amanda Spratt	Amanda Spratt	Liane Lippert	Leah Kirchmann	Liane Lippert	Mitchelton–Scott
3	Ruth Edwards	Ruth Edwards	Liane Lippert	Leah Kirchmann	Liane Lippert	Team Sunweb
4	Simona Frapporti	Ruth Edwards	Liane Lippert	Leah Kirchmann	Liane Lippert	Team Sunweb
Final		Ruth Edwards	Liane Lippert	Leah Kirchmann	Liane Lippert	Team Sunweb

== Classification standings ==
=== General classification ===
Final general classification (1–10)
Rank	Rider	Team	Time
1	Ruth Edwards (USA)	Trek–Segafredo	10h 11' 07"
2	Liane Lippert (GER)	Team Sunweb	+ 5"
3	Amanda Spratt (AUS)	Mitchelton–Scott	+ 6"
4	Lauren Stephens (USA)	Tibco–Silicon Valley Bank	+ 17"
5	Chloe Hosking (AUS)	Rally Cycling	+ 30"
6	Leah Kirchmann (CAN)	Team Sunweb	+ 32"
7	Andrea Ramírez (MEX)	Agolíco–BMC–PatoBike	+ 33"
8	Katia Ragusa (ITA)	Astana	+ 34"
9	Jessica Pratt (AUS)	Canyon//SRAM	+ 34"
10	Peta Mullens (AUS)	Roxsolt Attaquer	+ 35"

=== Points classification ===
Final points classification (1–10)
Rank	Rider	Team	Points
1	Leah Kirchmann (CAN)	Team Sunweb	136
2	Liane Lippert (GER)	Team Sunweb	136
3	Chloe Hosking (AUS)	Rally Cycling	130
4	Lotta Henttala (FIN)	Trek–Segafredo	121
5	Ruth Edwards (USA)	Trek–Segafredo	94
6	Gracie Elvin (AUS)	Mitchelton–Scott	90
7	Simona Frapporti (ITA)	Bepink	83
8	Anna Henderson (GBR)	Team Sunweb	82
9	Amanda Spratt (AUS)	Mitchelton–Scott	74
10	Lauren Stephens (USA)	Tibco–Silicon Valley Bank	68

=== Mountains classification ===
Final mountains classification (1–10)
Rank	Rider	Team	Points
1	Liane Lippert (GER)	Team Sunweb	19
2	Marieke de Groot (NED)	Doltcini–Van Eyck Sport	15
3	Amanda Spratt (AUS)	Mitchelton–Scott	14
4	Ella Harris (NZL)	Mitchelton–Scott	9
5	Ruth Edwards (USA)	Trek–Segafredo	9
6	Bree Wilson (AUS)	Roxsolt Attaquer	8
7	Urška Pintar (SLO)	Alé BTC Ljubljana	6
8	Grace Brown (AUS)	Mitchelton–Scott	6
9	Sarah Gigante (AUS)	Tibco–Silicon Valley Bank	4
10	Lucy Kennedy (AUS)	Mitchelton–Scott	4

=== Youth classification ===
Final youth classification (1–10)
Rank	Rider	Team	Time
1	Liane Lippert (GER)	Team Sunweb	10h 11' 12"
2	Andrea Ramírez (MEX)	Agolíco–BMC–PatoBike	+ 28"
3	Katia Ragusa (ITA)	Astana	+ 29"
4	Jessica Pratt (AUS)	Canyon//SRAM	+ 29"
5	Juliette Berthet (FRA)	Team Sunweb	+ 32"
6	Ella Harris (NZL)	Canyon//SRAM	+ 33"
7	Jaime Gunning (AUS)	Specialized Women's Racing	+ 35"
8	Ruby Roseman-Gannon (AUS)	Australia	+ 39"
9	Jenna Merrick (NZL)	Doltcini–Van Eyck Sport	+ 39"
10	Sarah Gigante (AUS)	Tibco–Silicon Valley Bank	+ 45

=== Teams classification ===
Final teams classification (1–10)
Rank	Team	Time
1	(Germany) Team Sunweb	30h 35' 03"
2	(Australia) Specialized Women's Racing	+ 29"
3	(France) FDJ Nouvelle-Aquitaine Futuroscope	+ 58"
4	(United States) Tibco–Silicon Valley Bank	+ 2' 19"
5	(Germany) Canyon//SRAM	+ 3' 46"
6	(Australia) Mitchelton–Scott	+ 4' 00"
7	(Australia) Roxsolt Attaquer	+ 4' 09"
8	(Italy) Alé BTC Ljubljana	+ 4' 25"
9	(United States) Rally Cycling	+ 5' 39"
10	(Mexico) Agolíco–BMC–PatoBike	+ 12' 01"
