= 2017 Women's Tour Down Under =

Race details
- Dates: 14–17 January 2017
- Stages: 4
- Distance: 271.9 km (169.0 mi)
- Winning time: 6h 59' 36"

Results
Jersey awarded to the overall winner	Winner	Amanda Spratt (AUS)	(Orica–Scott)
	Second	Janneke Ensing (NED)	(Alé–Cipollini)
	Third	Kirsten Wild (NED)	(Cylance Pro Cycling)
Jersey awarded to the mountains classification winner	Mountains	Janneke Ensing (NED)	(Alé–Cipollini)
Jersey awarded to the young rider classification winner	Young rider	Alexis Magner (USA)	(Canyon//SRAM)
Jersey awarded to the sprints classification winner	Sprints	Chloe Hosking (AUS)	(Alé–Cipollini)
	Team	Alé–Cipollini	

The 2017 Women's Tour Down Under (officially Santos Women's Tour for sponsorship reasons) was the 2nd edition of the Women's Tour Down Under. It began on 14 January in Hahndorf and finished on 17 January in Adelaide.

The race was won by Australian rider Amanda Spratt of Orica–Scott.

== Teams ==
Seventeen teams took part in the race.

- Canyon//SRAM
- High5 Dream Team
- Mercedes Adelaide Blackchrome
- Holden Racing
- New Zealand national team
- Specialized
- Orica–Scott
- Alé–Cipollini
- Cylance Pro Cycling
- NSWIS Syndey Uni
- Hagens Berman–Supermint
- UnitedHealthcare
- Drops
- Rush
- Sho-Air Twenty20
- Maaslandster Veris CCN
- Wiggle High5

== Route ==
Stage characteristics and winners
Stage	Date	Course	Distance	Type	Stage winner
1	14 January	Hahndorf to Meadows	106.5 km (66.2 mi)	Hilly stage	Amanda Spratt (AUS)
2	15 January	Adelaide to Adelaide	32.2 km (20.0 mi)	Flat stage	Kirsten Wild (NED)
3	16 January	Tanunda to Lyndoc	92.4 km (57.4 mi)	Hilly stage	Chloe Hosking (AUS)
4	17 January	Adelaide to Adelaide	40.8 km (25.4 mi)	Flat stage	Kirsten Wild (NED)
Total			271.9 km (169.0 mi)		

== Stages ==
=== Stage 1 ===
14 January 2017 — Hahndorf to Meadows, 106.5 km (66.2 mi)

Stage 1 Result
Rank	Rider	Team	Time
1	Amanda Spratt (AUS)	Orica–Scott	2h 51' 01"
2	Janneke Ensing (NED)	Alé–Cipollini	+ 19"
3	Katie Hall (USA)	UnitedHealthcare	+ 59"
4	Alexis Magner (USA)	Canyon//SRAM	+ 1' 01"
5	Danielle Rowe (GBR)	Cylance Pro Cycling	+ 1' 01"
6	Katrin Garfoot (AUS)	Orica–Scott	+ 1' 01"
7	Alice Wood (GBR)	Drops	+ 1' 01"
8	Peta Mullens (AUS)	Hagens Berman–Supermint	+ 1' 01"
9	Ruth Edwards (USA)	UnitedHealthcare	+ 1' 01"
10	Lauren Kitchen (AUS)	NSWIS Syndey Uni	+ 1' 01"

General classification after Stage 1
Rank	Rider	Team	Time
1	Amanda Spratt (AUS)	Orica–Scott	2h 51' 01"
2	Janneke Ensing (NED)	Alé–Cipollini	+ 19"
3	Katie Hall (USA)	UnitedHealthcare	+ 59"
4	Alexis Magner (USA)	Canyon//SRAM	+ 1' 01"
5	Danielle Rowe (GBR)	Cylance Pro Cycling	+ 1' 01"
6	Katrin Garfoot (AUS)	Orica–Scott	+ 1' 01"
7	Alice Wood (GBR)	Drops	+ 1' 01"
8	Peta Mullens (AUS)	Hagens Berman–Supermint	+ 1' 01"
9	Ruth Edwards (USA)	UnitedHealthcare	+ 1' 01"
10	Lauren Kitchen (AUS)	NSWIS Syndey Uni	+ 1' 01"

=== Stage 2 ===
15 January 2017 — Adelaide to Adelaide, 32.2 km (20.0 mi)

Stage 2 Result
Rank	Rider	Team	Time
1	Kirsten Wild (NED)	Cylance Pro Cycling	43' 57"
2	Rachele Barbieri (ITA)	Cylance Pro Cycling	+ 0"
3	Chloe Hosking (AUS)	Alé–Cipollini	+ 0"
4	Alice Wood (AUS)	Drops	+ 0"
5	Annette Edmondson (AUS)	Wiggle High5	+ 0"
6	Barbara Guarischi (ITA)	Canyon//SRAM	+ 0"
7	Anna Trevisi (ITA)	Alé–Cipollini	+ 0"
8	Gretchen Stumhofer (USA)	Sho-Air Twenty20	+ 0"
9	Chloé Dygert (USA)	Sho-Air Twenty20	+ 0"
10	Ruth Edwards (USA)	UnitedHealthcare	+ 0"

General classification after Stage 2
Rank	Rider	Team	Time
1	Amanda Spratt (AUS)	Orica–Scott	3h 34' 58"
2	Janneke Ensing (NED)	Alé–Cipollini	+ 19"
3	Kirsten Wild (NED)	Cylance Pro Cycling	+ 50"
4	Lauren Kitchen (AUS)	NSWIS Syndey Uni	+ 55"
5	Ruth Edwards (USA)	UnitedHealthcare	+ 57"
6	Katrin Garfoot (AUS)	Orica–Scott	+ 59"
7	Katie Hall (USA)	UnitedHealthcare	+ 59"
8	Peta Mullens (AUS)	Hagens Berman–Supermint	+ 1' 00"
9	Danielle Rowe (GBR)	Cylance Pro Cycling	+ 1' 00"
10	Alice Wood (GBR)	Drops	+ 1' 01"

=== Stage 3 ===
16 January 2017 — Tanunda to Lyndoc, 92.4 km (57.4 mi)

Stage 3 Result
Rank	Rider	Team	Time
1	Chloe Hosking (AUS)	Alé–Cipollini	+ 0"
2	Kirsten Wild (NED)	Cylance Pro Cycling	+ 50"
3	Alexis Magner (USA)	Canyon//SRAM	+ 1' 01"
4	Peta Mullens (AUS)	Hagens Berman–Supermint	+ 1' 00"
5	Rebecca Wiasak (AUS)	High5 Dream Team	+ 1' 00"
6	Tiffany Cromwell (AUS)	Canyon//SRAM	+ 1' 00"
7	Chloé Dygert (USA)	Sho-Air Twenty20	+ 0"
8	Susanna Zorzi (ITA)	Drops	+ 0"
9	Alice Wood (GBR)	Drops	+ 1' 01"
10	Julie Norman Leth (DEN)	Wiggle High5	+ 1' 01"

General classification after Stage 3
Rank	Rider	Team	Time
1	Amanda Spratt (AUS)	Orica–Scott	5h 56' 54"
2	Janneke Ensing (NED)	Alé–Cipollini	+ 19"
3	Kirsten Wild (NED)	Cylance Pro Cycling	+ 50"
4	Lauren Kitchen (AUS)	NSWIS Syndey Uni	+ 55"
5	Ruth Edwards (USA)	UnitedHealthcare	+ 57"
6	Katrin Garfoot (AUS)	Orica–Scott	+ 59"
7	Katie Hall (USA)	UnitedHealthcare	+ 59"
8	Peta Mullens (AUS)	Hagens Berman–Supermint	+ 1' 00"
9	Danielle Rowe (GBR)	Cylance Pro Cycling	+ 1' 00"
10	Alice Wood (GBR)	Drops	+ 1' 01"

=== Stage 4 ===
17 January 2017 — Adelaide to Adelaide, 40.8 km (25.4 mi)

Stage 4 Result
Rank	Rider	Team	Time
1	Kirsten Wild (NED)	Cylance Pro Cycling	1h 02' 42"
2	Annette Edmondson (AUS)	Wiggle High5	+ 0"
3	Chloe Hosking (AUS)	Alé–Cipollini	+ 0"
4	Peta Mullens (AUS)	Hagens Berman–Supermint	+ 0"
5	Grace Garner (GBR)	Wiggle High5	+ 0"
6	Chloé Dygert (USA)	Sho-Air Twenty20	+ 0"
7	Gretchen Stumhofer (USA)	Sho-Air Twenty20	+ 0"
8	Anna Trevisi (ITA)	Alé–Cipollini	+ 0"
9	Alexis Magner (USA)	Canyon//SRAM	+ 0"
10	Katrin Garfoot (AUS)	Orica–Scott	+ 0"

General classification after Stage 4
Rank	Rider	Team	Time
1	Amanda Spratt (AUS)	Orica–Scott	6h 59' 36"
2	Janneke Ensing (NED)	Alé–Cipollini	+ 25"
3	Kirsten Wild (NED)	Cylance Pro Cycling	+ 40"
4	Lauren Kitchen (AUS)	NSWIS Syndey Uni	+ 50"
5	Alexis Magner (USA)	Canyon//SRAM	+ 51"
6	Peta Mullens (AUS)	Hagens Berman–Supermint	+ 58"
7	Katrin Garfoot (AUS)	Orica–Scott	+ 59"
8	Ruth Edwards (USA)	UnitedHealthcare	+ 59"
9	Alice Wood (GBR)	Drops	+ 1' 01"
10	Susanna Zorzi (ITA)	Drops	+ 1'01"

== Classification leadership table ==
Classification leadership by stage
Stage	Winner	General classification	Sprints classification	Mountains classification	Young rider classification
1	Amanda Spratt	Amanda Spratt	Amanda Spratt	Amanda Spratt	Alexis Magner
2	Kirsten Wild	Amanda Spratt	Chloe Hosking	Amanda Spratt	Ruth Edwards
3	Chloe Hosking	Amanda Spratt	Chloe Hosking	Janneke Ensing	Ruth Edwards
4	Kirsten Wild	Amanda Spratt	Chloe Hosking	Janneke Ensing	Alexis Magner
Final		Amanda Spratt	Chloe Hosking	Janneke Ensing	Alexis Magner

== Classification standings ==
Legend
Denotes the winner of the general classification	Denotes the winner of the sprints classification
Denotes the winner of the mountains classification	Denotes the winner of the young rider classification

=== General classification ===
Final general classification (1–10)
Rank	Rider	Team	Time
1	Amanda Spratt (AUS)	Orica–Scott	6h 59' 36"
2	Janneke Ensing (NED)	Alé–Cipollini	+ 25"
3	Kirsten Wild (NED)	Cylance Pro Cycling	+ 40"
4	Lauren Kitchen (AUS)	NSWIS Syndey Uni	+ 50"
5	Alexis Magner (USA)	Canyon//SRAM	+ 51"
6	Peta Mullens (AUS)	Hagens Berman–Supermint	+ 58"
7	Katrin Garfoot (AUS)	Orica–Scott	+ 59"
8	Ruth Edwards (USA)	UnitedHealthcare	+ 59"
9	Alice Wood (GBR)	Drops	+ 1' 01"
10	Susanna Zorzi (ITA)	Drops	+ 1'01"

=== Sprints classification ===
Final sprints classification (1–10)
Rank	Rider	Team	Points
1	Chloe Hosking (AUS)	Alé–Cipollini	44
2	Kirsten Wild (NED)	Cylance Pro Cycling	30
3	Lauren Kitchen (AUS)	NSWIS Syndey Uni	30
4	Alexis Magner (USA)	Canyon//SRAM	30
5	Ruth Edwards (USA)	UnitedHealthcare	16
6	Peta Mullens (AUS)	Hagens Berman–Supermint	14
7	Amanda Spratt (AUS)	Orica–Scott	10
8	Janneke Ensing (NED)	Alé–Cipollini	8
9	Annette Edmondson (AUS)	Wiggle High5	8
10	Rachele Barbieri (ITA)	Cylance Pro Cycling	8

=== Mountains classification ===
Final mountains classification (1–9)
Rank	Rider	Team	Points
1	Janneke Ensing (NED)	Alé–Cipollini	40
2	Amanda Spratt (AUS)	Orica–Scott	24
3	Katrin Garfoot (AUS)	Orica–Scott	9
4	Georgia Williams (NZL)	New Zealand national team	8
5	Rushlee Buchanan (NZL)	UnitedHealthcare	8
6	Peta Mullens (AUS)	Hagens Berman–Supermint	4
7	Alice Wood (GBR)	Drops	4
8	Emma Pooley (GBR)	Holden Racing	4
9	Danielle King (GBR)	Cylance Pro Cycling	1

=== Young rider classification ===
Final young rider classification (1–10)
Rank	Rider	Team	Time
1	Alexis Magner (USA)	Canyon//SRAM	7h 00' 27"
2	Ruth Edwards (USA)	UnitedHealthcare	+ 8"
3	Alice Wood (GBR)	Drops	+ 10"
4	Susanna Zorzi (ITA)	Drops	+ 10"
5	Georgia Williams (NZL)	New Zealand national team	+ 10"
6	Jenelle Crooks (AUS)	Orica–Scott	+ 16"
7	Shannon Malseed (AUS)	Holden Racing	+ 16"
8	Amanda Jamieson (NZL)	Maaslandster Veris CCN	+ 1' 48"
9	Mikayla Harvey (NZL)	New Zealand national team	+ 1' 48"
10	Julie Norman Leth (DEN)	Wiggle High5	+ 1' 48"

=== Team classification ===
Final team classification (1–6)
Rank	Team	Time
1	(Australia) Orica–Scott	21h 00' 50"
2	(United Kingdom) Drops	+ 1' 01"
3	(United States) UnitedHealthcare	+ 1' 11"
4	(Italy) Alé–Cipollini	+ 1' 57"
5	(United States) Cylance Pro Cycling	+ 1' 59"
6	(United States) Sho-Air Twenty20	+ 4' 11"
