= 2017 Tour Cycliste Féminin International de l'Ardèche =

Race details
- Dates: 5–11 September 2017
- Stages: 7 stages
- Distance: 628.32 km (390.4 mi)

The 2017 Tour Cycliste Féminin International de l'Ardèche is a women's cycle stage race held in France from 5 September to 11 September, 2017. The tour has an UCI rating of 2.2.

== Stages ==
List of stages
Stage	Date	Course	Distance	Type	Winner
1	5 September	Le Pouzin to Beauchastel	97.42 km (60.5 mi)	Flat stage	Katarzyna Pawłowska (POL)
2	6 September	Orange to Orange	122.3 km (76.0 mi)	Flat stage	Katarzyna Pawłowska (POL)
3	7 September	Malataverne to Malataverne	9.31 km (5.8 mi)	Time Trial	Lauren Stephens (USA)
4	7 September	Montélimar to Cruas	89.55 km (55.6 mi)	Flat stage	Silvia Valsecchi (ITA)
5	8 September	Privas to Villeneuve-de-Berg	129.18 km (80.3 mi)	Flat stage	Jessica Pratt (AUS)
6	9 September	Saint-Sauveur-de-Montagut to Vernoux-en-Vivarais	91.08 km (56.6 mi)	Flat stage	Lucy Kennedy (AUS)
7	10 September	Mende to Station de ski du Mont Lozère	89.48 km (55.6 mi)	Mountain stage	Pauliena Rooijakkers (NED)
Total			628.32 km (390.4 mi)		

== Classification leadership ==
Stage	Winner	General classification	Young rider classification	Points classification	Mountains classification	Sprints classification	Combination classification	Combativity classification	Teams classification
1	Katarzyna Pawłowska	Katarzyna Pawłowska	Ramona Forchini	Katarzyna Pawłowska	Nikola Nosková	Ramona Forchini	Alison Jackson	Silvia Valsecchi	Bepink–Cogeas
2	Katarzyna Pawłowska	Katarzyna Pawłowska	Ramona Forchini	Katarzyna Pawłowska	Danielle Christmas	Ramona Forchini	Alison Jackson	Shannon Malseed	Bepink–Cogeas
3	Lauren Stephens	Lauren Stephens	Ramona Forchini	Katarzyna Pawłowska	Danielle Christmas	Ramona Forchini	Lauren Stephens	Not awarded	Tibco–Silicon Valley Bank
4	Silvia Valsecchi	Lauren Stephens	Ramona Forchini	Katarzyna Pawłowska	Danielle Christmas	Ramona Forchini	Lauren Stephens	Bérengère Staelens	Tibco–Silicon Valley Bank
5	Jessica Pratt	Lauren Stephens	Annabelle Dreville	Katarzyna Pawłowska	Danielle Christmas	Ramona Forchini	Danielle Christmas	Lex Albrecht	Australia (National team)
6	Lucy Kennedy	Lucy Kennedy	Nikola Nosková	Lucy Kennedy	Hanna Nilsson	Maria Vittoria Sperotto	Leah Thomas	Llorena Llamas Garcia	Australia (National team)
7	Pauliena Rooijakkers	Lucy Kennedy	Nikola Nosková	Lucy Kennedy	Hanna Nilsson	Alison Jackson	Leah Thomas		Parkhotel Valkenburg–Destil
Final		Lucy Kennedy	Nikola Nosková	Lucy Kennedy	Hanna Nilsson	Alison Jackson	Leah Thomas		Parkhotel Valkenburg–Destil
