= Alison Jackson (cyclist) =

Canadian cyclist (born 1988)

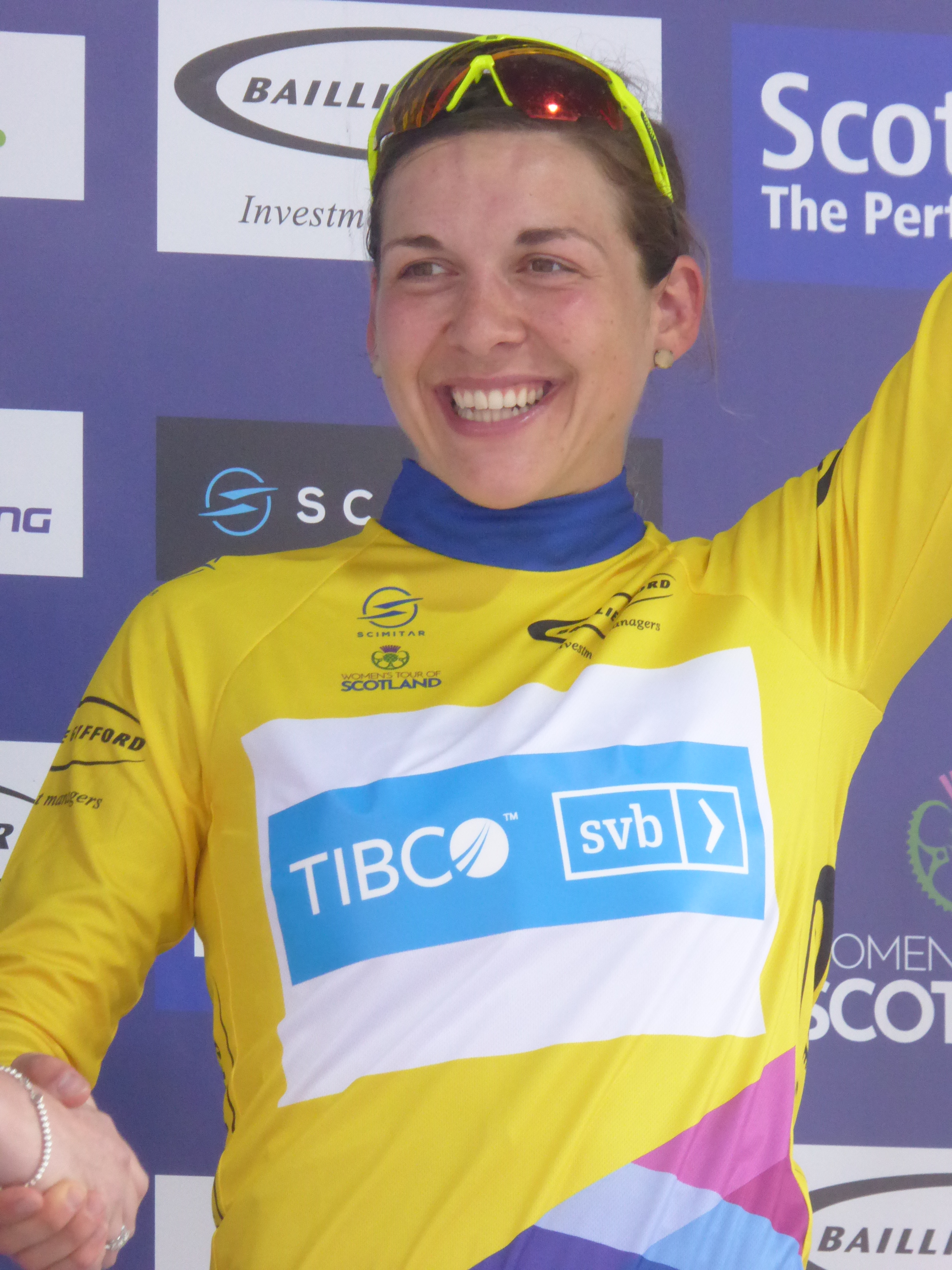
- Jackson at the 2019 Women's Tour of Scotland

Personal information
- Full name: Alison Jackson
- Born: Alison Farkash; 14 December 1988 (age 37) Vermilion, Alberta, Canada
- Height: 1.68 m (5 ft 6 in)

Cycling career
- Sport: Cycling
- Current team: St. Michel–Preference Home–Auber93
- Role: Rider
- Rider type: All-rounder

Professional teams
- 2015–2016: Twenty16 p/b Sho-Air
- 2017: Bepink–Cogeas
- 2018–2019: Tibco–Silicon Valley Bank
- 2020: Team Sunweb
- 2021–2022: Liv Racing Xstra
- 2023: EF Education–Tibco–SVB
- 2024–2025: EF Education–Cannondale
- 2025–: St. Michel–Preference Home–Auber93

Major wins
- Major Tours La Vuelta Femenina 1 individual stage (2024) One-day races and Classics National Road Race Championships (2021, 2023, 2025) National Time Trial Championships (2021) Paris–Roubaix (2023)
Medal record
Women's road bicycle racing
Representing Canada
Pan American Championships
Silver medal – second place	2023 Panama City	Road race
Bronze medal – third place	2023 Panama City	Time trial

Alison Jackson (née Farkash; born 14 December 1988) is a Canadian professional racing cyclist, who rides for UCI Women's ProTeam St. Michel–Preference Home–Auber93. Since turning professional, Jackson has taken eleven victories – including the Canadian National Road Race Championships three times (2021, 2023 and 2025), the Canadian National Time Trial Championships in 2021, and in April 2023, she won Paris–Roubaix Femmes, described as the "biggest win of her career".

== Early life ==
Jackson was born and raised on a bison farm in rural Alberta, the second of three children. As a young adult, she competed in triathlon, subsequently being offered a running scholarship at Trinity Western University. After graduating in 2014 with a degree in human kinetics, kinesiology and exercise science, Jackson made the decision to focus on cycling.

== Career ==
=== 2015–2019 ===
Jackson signed her first professional contract in 2015 for Twenty16 p/b Sho-Air. During her time at the team, she won stages at the Tour Cycliste Féminin International de l'Ardèche and the Trophée d'Or Féminin. She also rode for Twenty16 p/b Sho-Air in the women's team time trial at the 2015 UCI Road World Championships. She moved to Bepink–Cogeas for the 2017 season, before moving again in 2018, to Tibco–Silicon Valley Bank. During her time at Tibco–Silicon Valley Bank, Jackson won the second stage of the 2019 Women's Tour of Scotland, finishing second to Leah Thomas in the overall general classification.

=== 2020s ===
Jackson moved to Team Sunweb for the 2020 season, competing in only eleven races due to the COVID-19 pandemic. Jackson moved to Liv Racing for the 2021 season. That July, Jackson received a last minute quota spot to enter the road race competition at the pandemic-delayed 2020 Summer Olympics, with Jackson finishing 32nd. Following her wins in both the Canadian National Road Race Championships and the Canadian National Time Trial Championships, and a sixth-place finish in the women's road race at the UCI Road World Championships in Belgium, Jackson signed a contract extension with Liv Racing. She won the points classification at the 2022 Tour of Scandinavia, and finished second in both the Canadian National Road Race Championships and the Drentse Acht van Westerveld, but took no individual victories.

At the end of the 2022 season, Jackson returned to the now-named EF Education–Tibco–SVB team for the 2023 season, having ridden for the team in 2018 and 2019. That April, Jackson won Paris–Roubaix Femmes in a sprint finish, which was described as the "biggest victory of her career". She also won two medals at the Pan American Road Championships in Panama – finishing third in the time trial and second to Skylar Schneider in the road race – and a second Canadian National Road Race Championships title, won in her home province of Alberta. EF Education–Tibco–SVB folded at the end of the 2023 season, with Jackson joining EF Education–Cannondale for 2024. Her first victory with the team came when she won the second stage of La Vuelta Femenina, winning the sprint into Moncofa. She also contested several gravel cycling races, including the British National Championships route, in which she was the first rider to finish.

In 2025, and after top-ten placings at Paris–Roubaix (fifth) and the Amstel Gold Race (seventh), Jackson won the Gracia–Orlová stage race – her first general classification victory – also winning a stage, and the points classification. She then won the Canadian National Road Race Championships for the third time in five years, winning by more than a minute in Saint-Georges, Quebec.

In October 2025, Jackson announced her move to from EF Education-Oatly to join French squad St Michel-Preference Home-Auber93 on a two-year deal.

== Major results ==
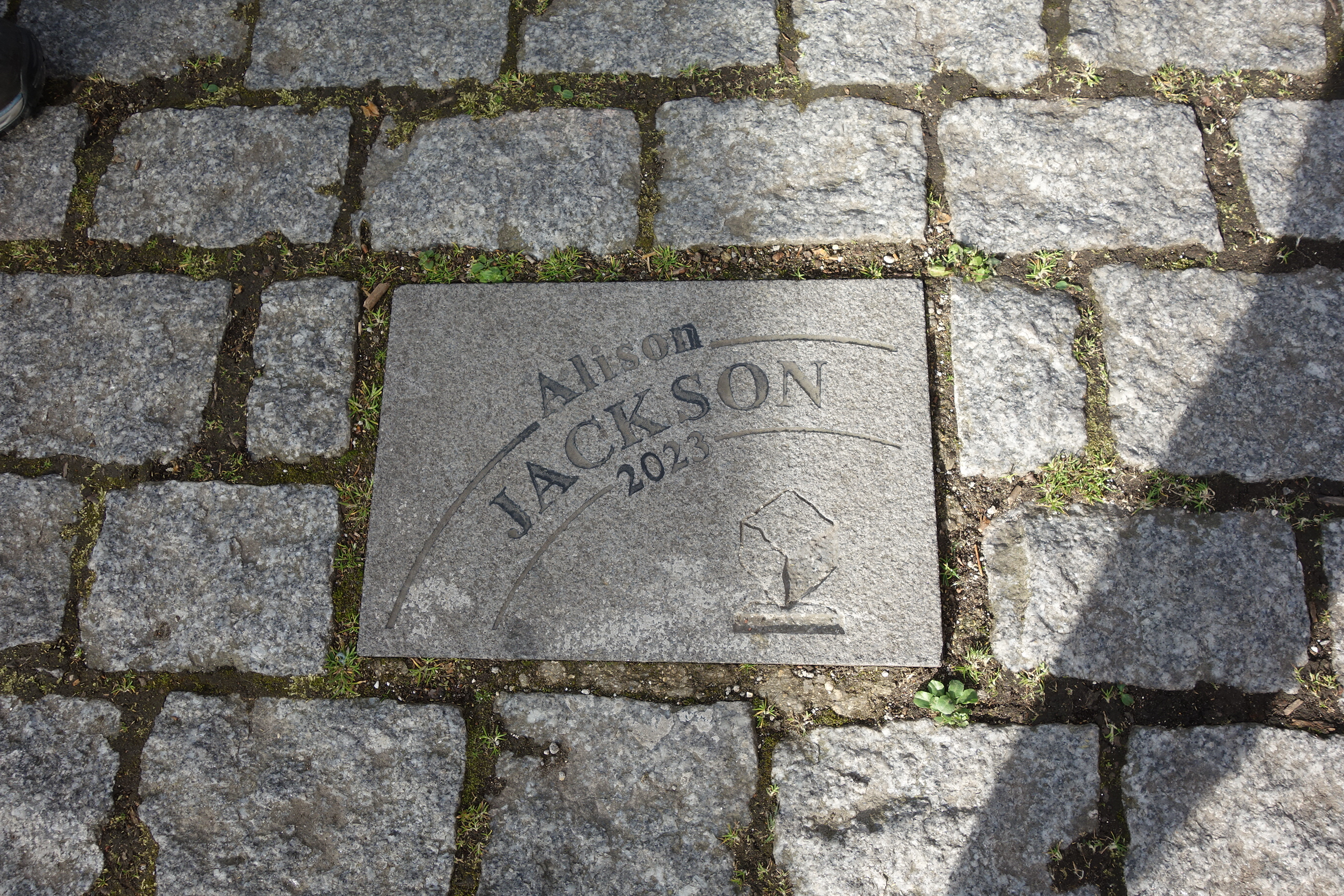
Plaque in Roubaix commemorating her victory at the 2023 Paris–Roubaix Femmes

2014
1st Overall Tour de White Rock

1st Stage 1

Tour de Delta

2nd MK Delta Criterium
6th Brenco Criterium

9th White Spot / Delta Road Race
2015
National Road Championships

1st Criterium
4th Road race
7th Time trial

1st Heusden
1st Points classification, Tour of the Gila
2nd Massemen
2nd Haasdonk
3rd Overall Tour de White Rock
3rd Profronde van Oostvoorne
4th Ridderronde Maastricht
5th De Klinge
6th Overall Chico Stage Race

1st Stages 1 & 4

6th Draai van de Kaai
6th Maria-Ter-Heide
7th Overall Tour of California
7th Gastown Grand Prix
8th Overall Redlands Bicycle Classic

1st Stage 1

8th Cityronde van Tiel
10th Grand Prix cycliste de Gatineau
2016
1st Stage 6 Tour Cycliste Féminin International de l'Ardèche
1st Stage 1 Chico Stage Race
1st Stage 2 (TTT) Tour of California
2nd Overall Tour de Murrieta
2nd Overall Tour de White Rock
3rd White Spot / Delta Road Race
3rd Giro di Burnaby
3rd PoCo Grand Prix
4th Overall Valley of the Sun

1st Stages 2 & 3

5th Road race, National Road Championships
5th Gastown Grand Prix
6th Grand Prix Cycliste de Gatineau
Winston-Salem Cycling Classic

6th Road race
6th Criterium

Tour de Delta

6th Brenco Criterium
6th MK Delta Criterium

8th Overall Cascade Cycling Classic
8th Overall Trophée d'Or Féminin

1st Stage 3

9th Chrono Gatineau
10th Philadelphia Cycling Classic
2017
1st Romanengo ITT
1st Stage 1 (TTT) Setmana Ciclista Valenciana
3rd Road race, National Road Championships
2018
1st Oudenaarde–GP de President
2nd Grand Prix Cycliste de Gatineau
National Road Championships

4th Road race
5th Time trial

5th Winston-Salem Cycling Classic
6th Overall Belgium Tour
6th Erondegemse Pijl
6th GP de Plouay
8th Overall Herald Sun Tour
9th Overall Ladies Tour of Norway
10th White Spot / Delta Road Race
10th Tour of Guangxi
2019
1st White Spot / Delta Road Race
2nd Overall Tour of Scotland

1st Stage 2

2nd Tour of Guangxi
5th Time trial, National Road Championships
5th Overall Women's Tour Down Under
9th Overall Herald Sun Tour
9th Amstel Gold Race
2020
9th Three Days of Bruges–De Panne
2021
National Road Championships

1st Road race
1st Time trial

1st Points classification, Ladies Tour of Norway
5th Dwars door Vlaanderen
5th Drentse Acht van Westerveld
6th Road race, UCI Road World Championships
8th Overall Holland Ladies Tour

1st Stage 1

2022
1st Points classification, Tour of Scandinavia
2nd Road race, National Road Championships
2nd Drentse Acht van Westerveld
7th Overall Baloise Ladies Tour
8th Overall Holland Ladies Tour
2023
National Road Championships

1st Road race
4th Time trial

1st Paris–Roubaix
Pan American Road Championships

2nd Road race
3rd Time trial

2nd Tour de Gatineau
2nd Clásica de Almería
4th Trofeo Oro in Euro
5th Dwars door de Westhoek
5th Chrono Gatineau
2024
1st Stage 2 La Vuelta Femenina
4th Grand Prix International d'Isbergues
8th Flanders Diamond Tour
10th Trofeo Felanitx–Colònia de Sant Jordi (Ses Salines)
2025
National Road Championships

1st Road race
4th Time trial

1st Overall Gracia–Orlová

1st Points classification
1st Stage 2

5th Paris–Roubaix
7th Amstel Gold Race
