= Carlee Taylor =

Australian cyclist

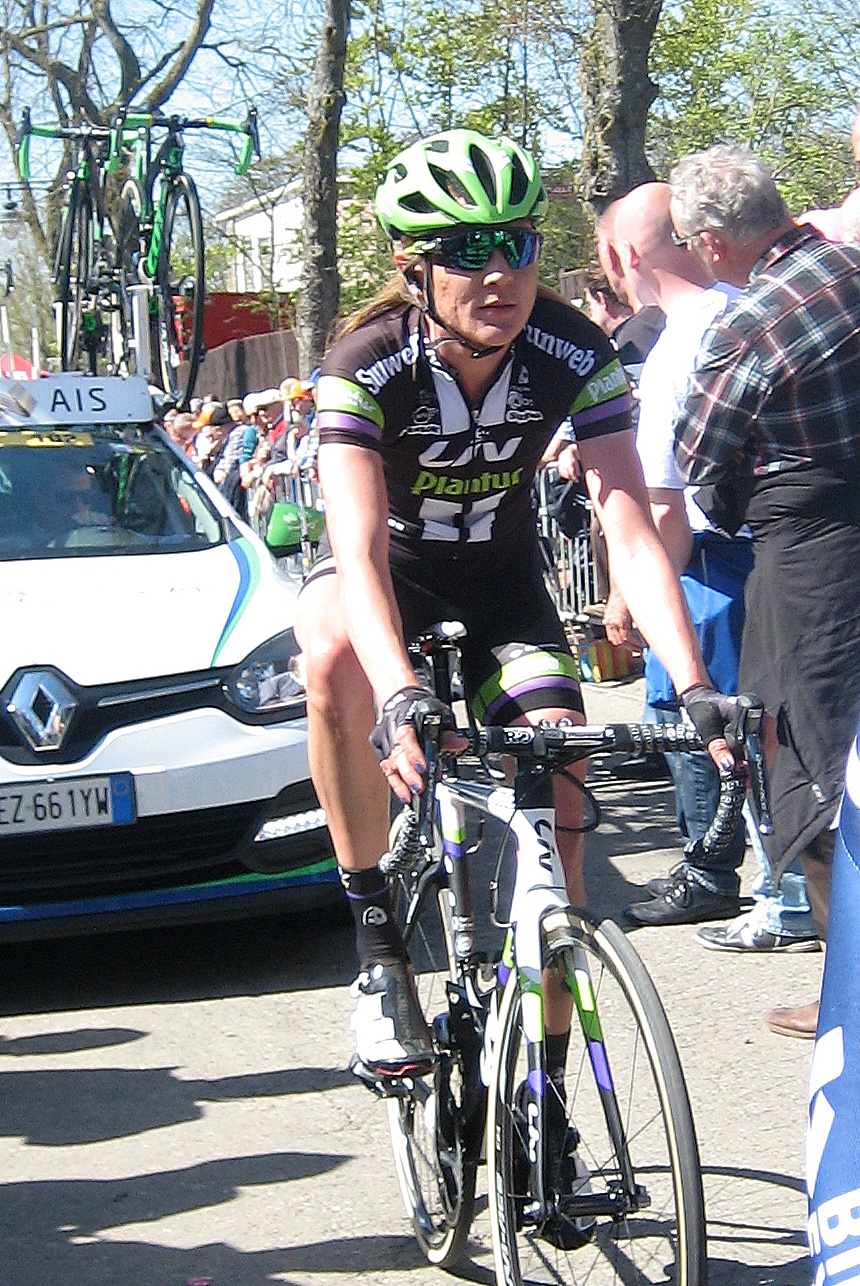
- Carlee Taylor after the Walloon Arrow 2016 finish

Personal information
- Born: 15 February 1989 (age 37) Adelaide, Australia

Cycling career
- Sport: Cycling
- Current team: Roxsolt Liv SRAM
- Discipline: Road
- Role: Rider
- Rider type: Climbing specialist

Amateur team
- 2018: Holden Women's Racing

Professional teams
- 2011: Team TIBCO–To The Top
- 2012: Vienne Futuroscope
- 2013: Lotto–Belisol Ladies
- 2014: Orica–AIS
- 2015: Lotto–Soudal Ladies
- 2016: Team Liv–Plantur
- 2017: Alé–Cipollini
- 2021–: Roxsolt Liv SRAM

Carlee Taylor (born 15 February 1989) is an Australian racing cyclist, who currently rides for UCI Women's Continental Team Roxsolt Liv SRAM. She took up cycling in 2007 after previously competing in triathlon.

== See also ==
- 2014 Orica-AIS season
