= White Spot / Delta Road Race =

White Spot / Delta Road Race is the name of two cycling races:

- White Spot / Delta Road Race (men's race)
- White Spot / Delta Road Race (women's race)
