= Tour de Timor =

Race details
- Date: September
- Region: East Timor
- English name: Tour de Timor
- Discipline: Mountain
- Type: Stage race
- Web site: www.tourdetimor.com

History
- First edition: August 2009; 17 years ago
- Editions: 10 (as of 2018)
- First winner: M: Neil Van der Ploeg (AUS); W: Tory Thomas (AUS)
- Most recent: M: David Vaz (PRT); W: Gina Ricardo (AUS)

The Tour de Timor is an international mountain bike race held in East Timor. It is a stage race with five stages, with US$75,000 in total prizes.

The race is open for male and female cyclists.

The first Tour de Timor international mountain bike race was held in August 2009

This race is an initiative of HE the President of the Republic, Dr. José Ramos-Horta, as part of his “Dili – City of Peace” campaign.

The inaugural race was a watershed event for the country, with 300 competitors from 12 countries, over 100 registered media and the largest level of Timorese participation in any event of the young country’s history.

288 riders participated in the 5-day, 450 km race that commenced on 24 August and ended in Dili on 28 August 2009. Hundreds of thousands of Timorese lined the streets of the 450-km course through 9 of the country’s 13 districts.

The event included a squad of 25 Timorese riders, chosen from a national selection race in July 2009, who represented their country for the first time. The Timor-Leste National squad was provided with one month of support with professional coaching, rations and quarters at the F-FDTL 1 BIL Base Baucau, per-diem wages and full professional cycling equipment to the value of approx US$2500 each.

The Timorese public were engaged in the event through organising and in supporting the athletes as they passed through their communities. The “Festival of Peace” was a further element of the Tour de Timor, which engaged thousands of children and youth in social activities such as art, music and drama at each of the end stages of the Tour in the districts.

The Tour de Timor was covered by national and international press and journalists. The Tour generated substantial regional and International interest and coverage of Timor-Leste in the lead up to the 10th anniversary of the Popular Consultation.

The event was won by Australian Neil Van der Ploeg. The first-place prize was US$15,000 out of a total prize pool of US$75,000. Two Timorese riders, Ozorio Marquas and Jacinto de Jesus da Costa finished in the top 25.

The Government of Timor-Leste, in conjunction with the Office of the President of the Republic, was the main sponsor of the Tour de Timor. Her Royal Highness Princess Haya Bint Al Hussein of Jordan was the largest private sponsor and Digicel was the major commercial sponsor. Substantial in-kind support was also sourced from AirNorth, UNMIT, the Australian Army (ISF), AustAsia Airlines, Timor Telecom and many other private enterprises, which contributed to making the event a success.

The inaugural Tour de Timor was considered a commercial success. The 2010 Tour de Timor was subsequently scheduled for 13 – 17 September 2010.

== History ==
In 2006, a first edition of the Tour de Timor was planned, but was cancelled due to an outbreak of violence.

== 2009 event ==
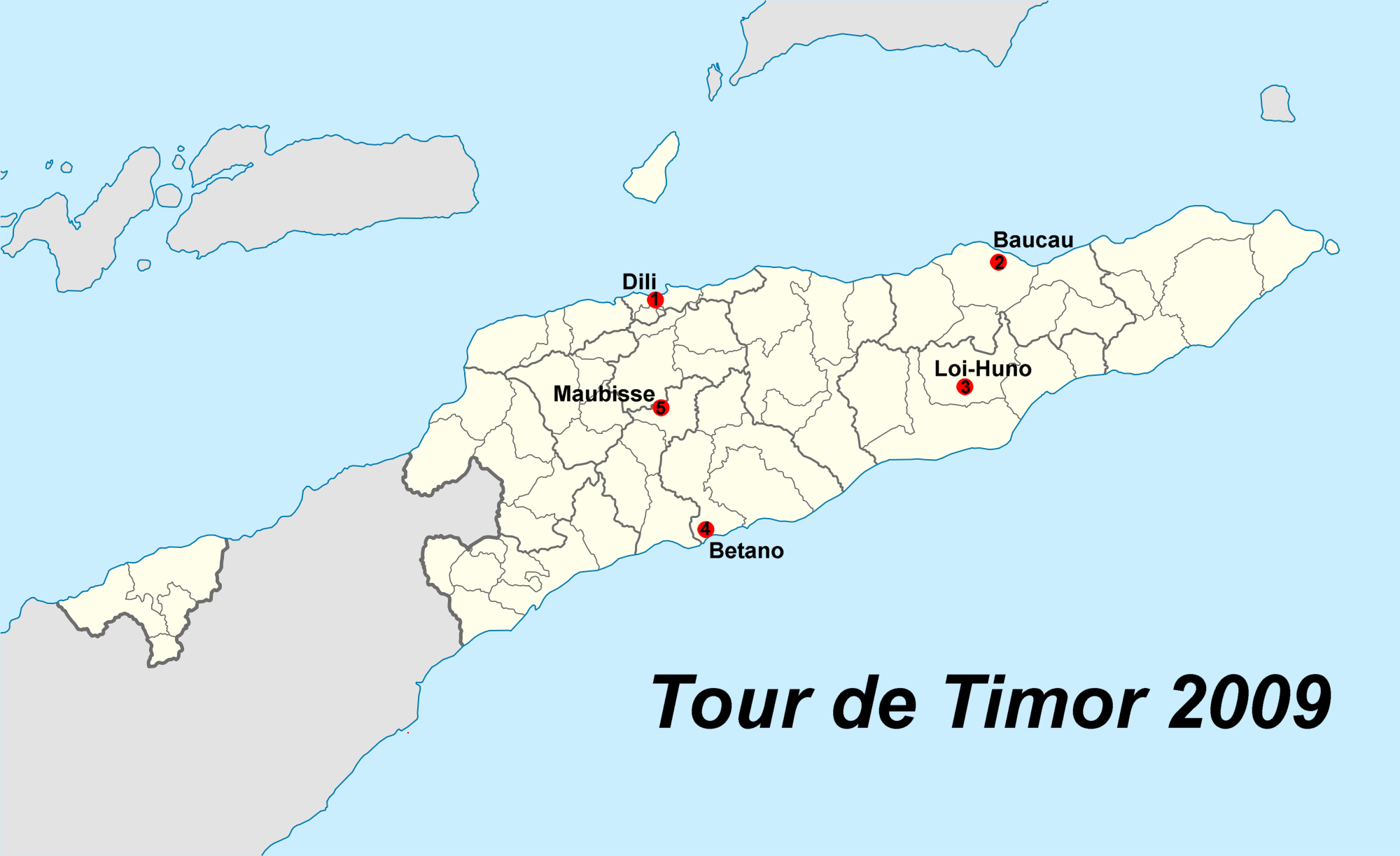
Tour de Timor 2009

The inaugural 2009 edition of the Tour de Timor started on 24 August, and ended on 28 August. 257 cyclists from 15 countries were in the race. The course covered approximately 450 km over the five days.

Neil Van der Ploeg won the Open Men's in a total time of 14:23:26, while Tory Thomas took out the Open Women's title in a time of 17:13:40. Ben Mather was crowned King of the Mountain(s). Ozorio Marquas was the top placed Timorese rider, crossing the finish line in 22nd place.

The race began at the presidential palace in Dili and visited Baucau, Loi-Huno, Betano and Maubisse, ending in Dili.

Category	Winner	Overall Time	Nationality
Male	Neil Van der Ploeg	14:23:26	Australian
Female	Tory Thomas	17:13:40	Australian

Overall course profile and map

== 2010 event ==
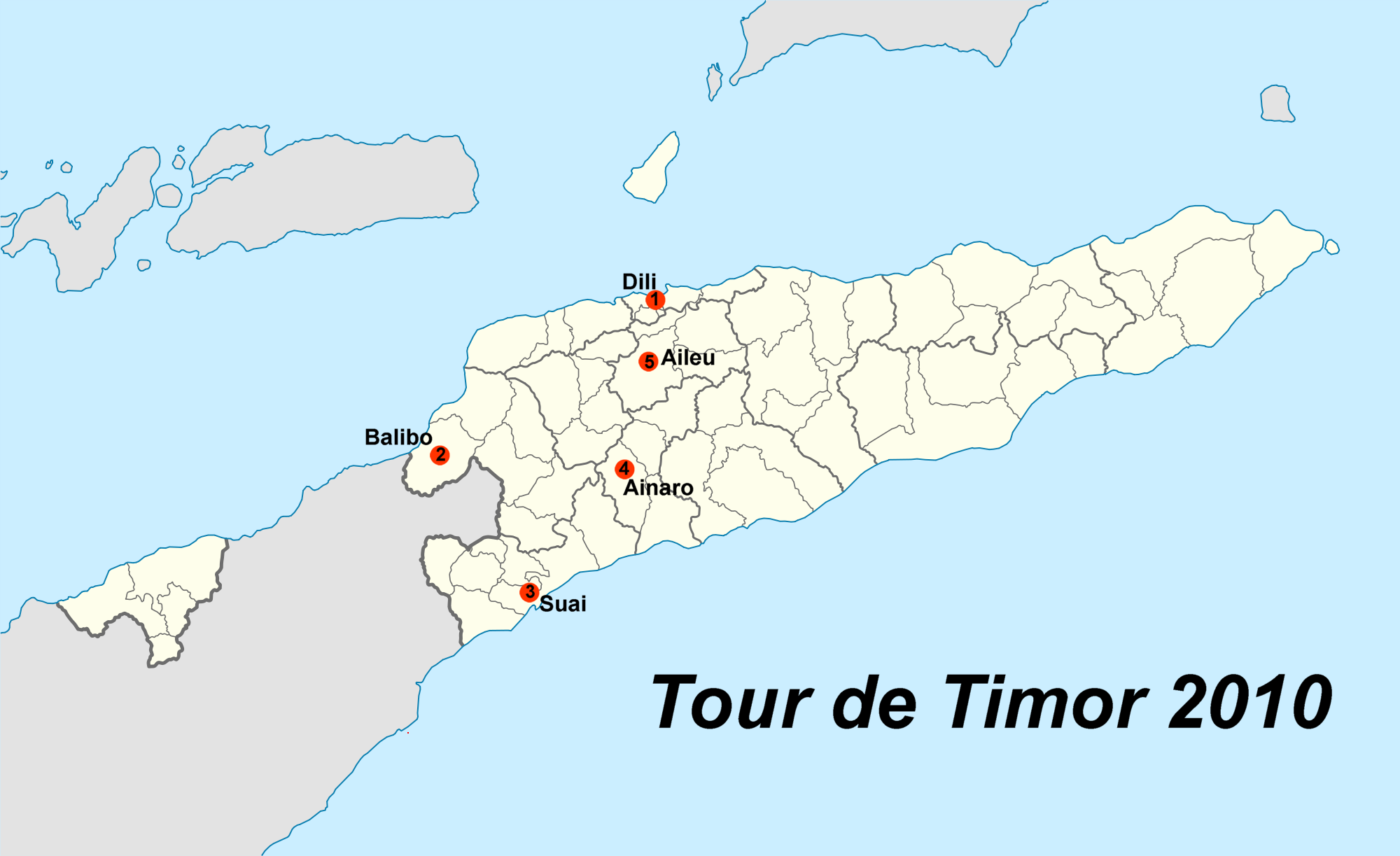
Tour de Timor 2010

The 2010 Tour de Timor was given the tagline: bigger, better, tougher. Over 350 international and local riders took part in the event. The course once again lasted 5 days and travelled over 420 km.

Adrian Jackson won the open men's category, beating out Steele Von Hoff by 29 seconds, with a time of 14:35:22, and Rowena Fry won the open women's category in 16:35:23. The first placed Timorese rider was Jacinto da Costa, coming in 13th overall, while his brother Orlando came in 14th.

The race started at the Presidential palace in Dili and travelled to Balibo, Suai, Ainaro and Aileu before returning to Dili.

Category	Winner	Overall Time	Nationality
Male	Adrian Jackson	14:35:22	Australia
Female	Rowena Fry	16:35:23	Australia

== 2011 event ==
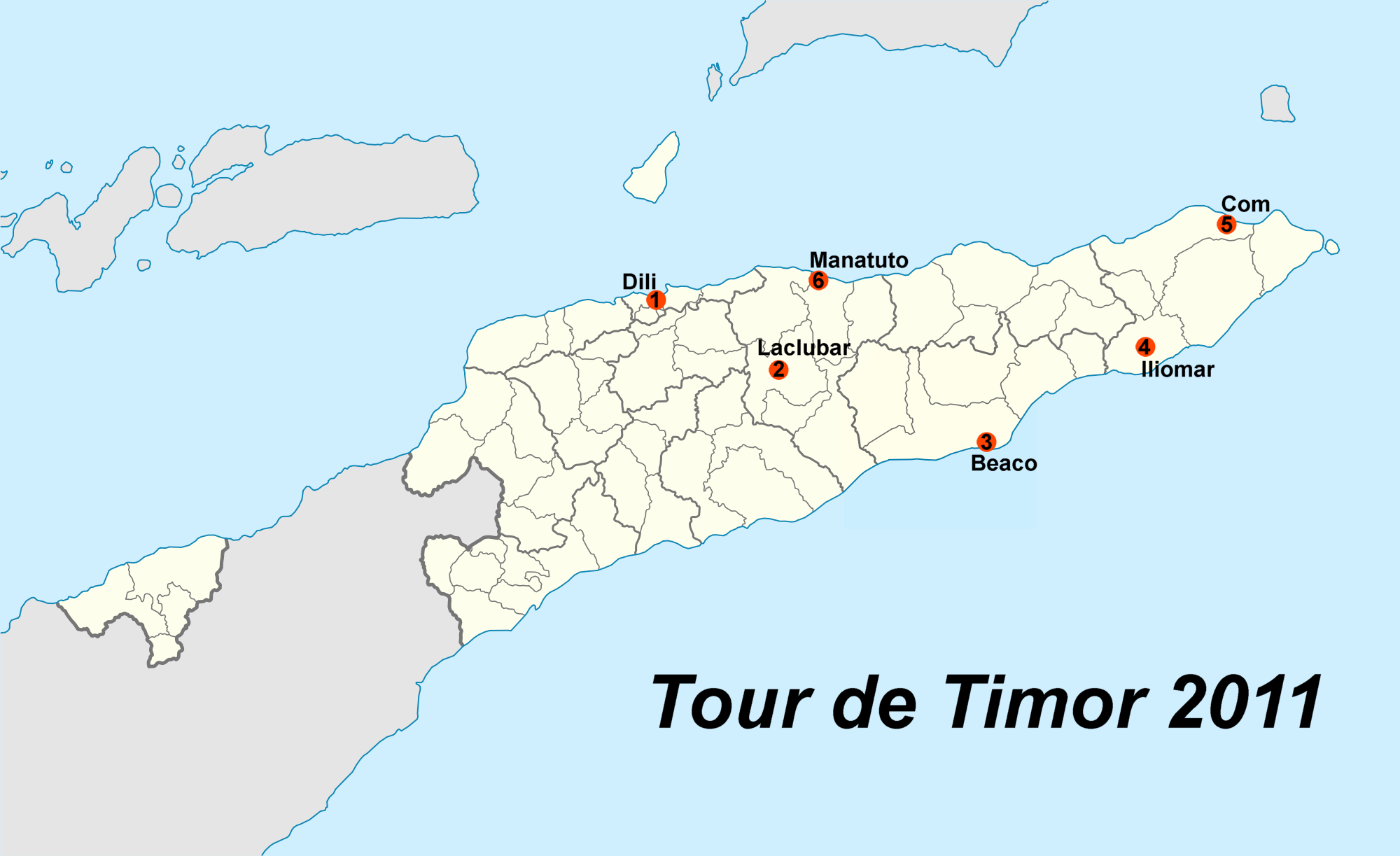
Tour de Timor 2011

The 2011 Tour de Timor was held from 11 to 16 September and ran under the theme "Peace Begins With Me." 350 riders in total took part in the race, and about 80 of them were natives of East Timor. The course lasted 6 days and covered approximately 500 km. The total prize money increased to 100,000 U.S. dollars, of which $10,000 each went to the male and female winners.

Luke Fetch won the open men's category, and Peta Mullens won the open women's category. The highest finishing East Timorese woman and man were Franchilina "Anche" Cabral and Orlando da Costa respectively.

The first stage started from the capital Dili and ran southeast to Laclubar. On the second day it went south to Beaco, and on the third day it went along the coast to Iliomar. The fourth stage ended in Com on the north coast. Stage Five was from Baucau along the north coast to Manatuto, with a return to Dili on the sixth and final stage.

Category	Winner	Overall Time	Nationality
Male	Luke Fetch	20:49:56	Australia
Female	Peta Mullens	23:53:13	Australia

== 2012 event ==
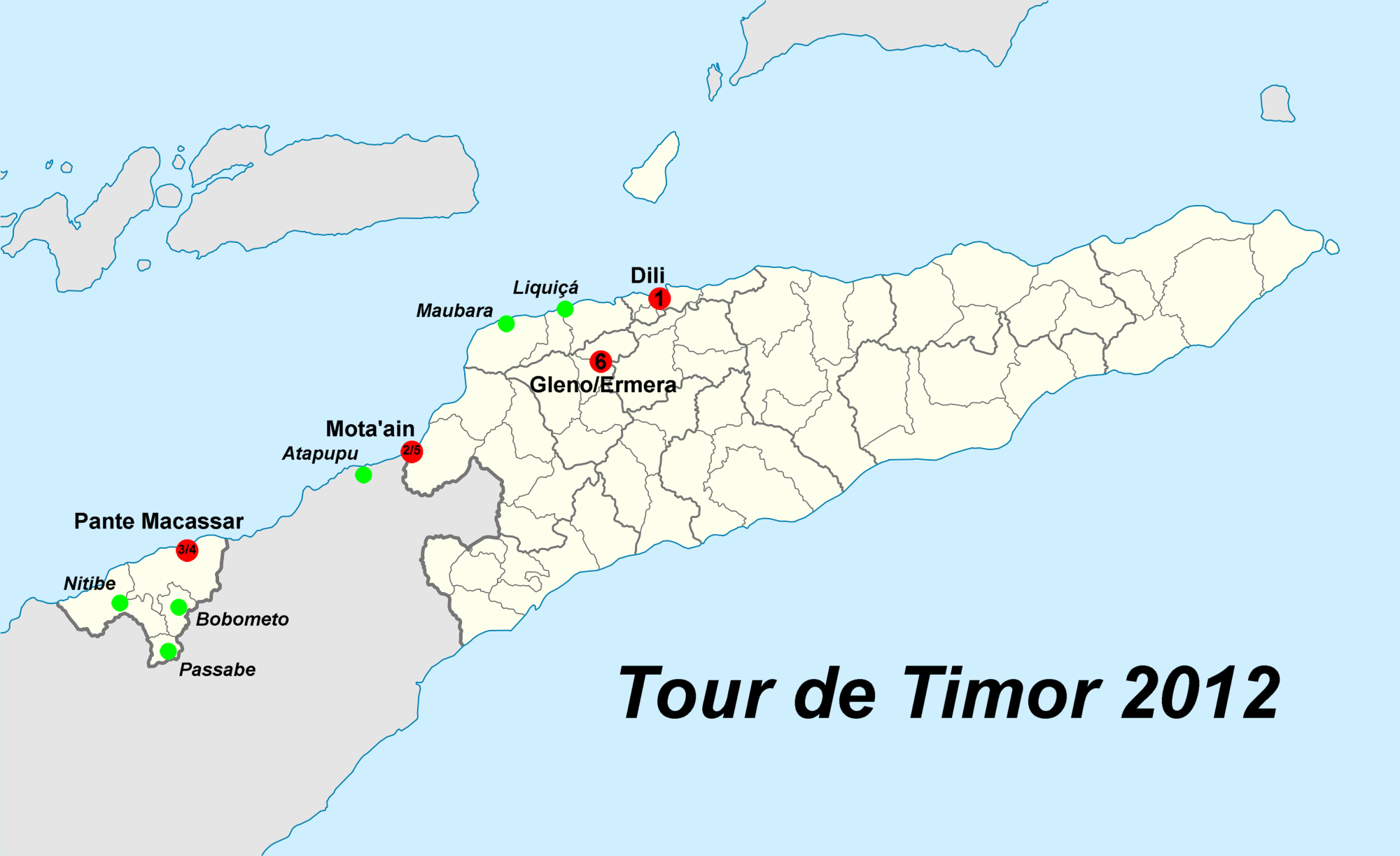
Tour de Timor 2012

== 2013 event ==
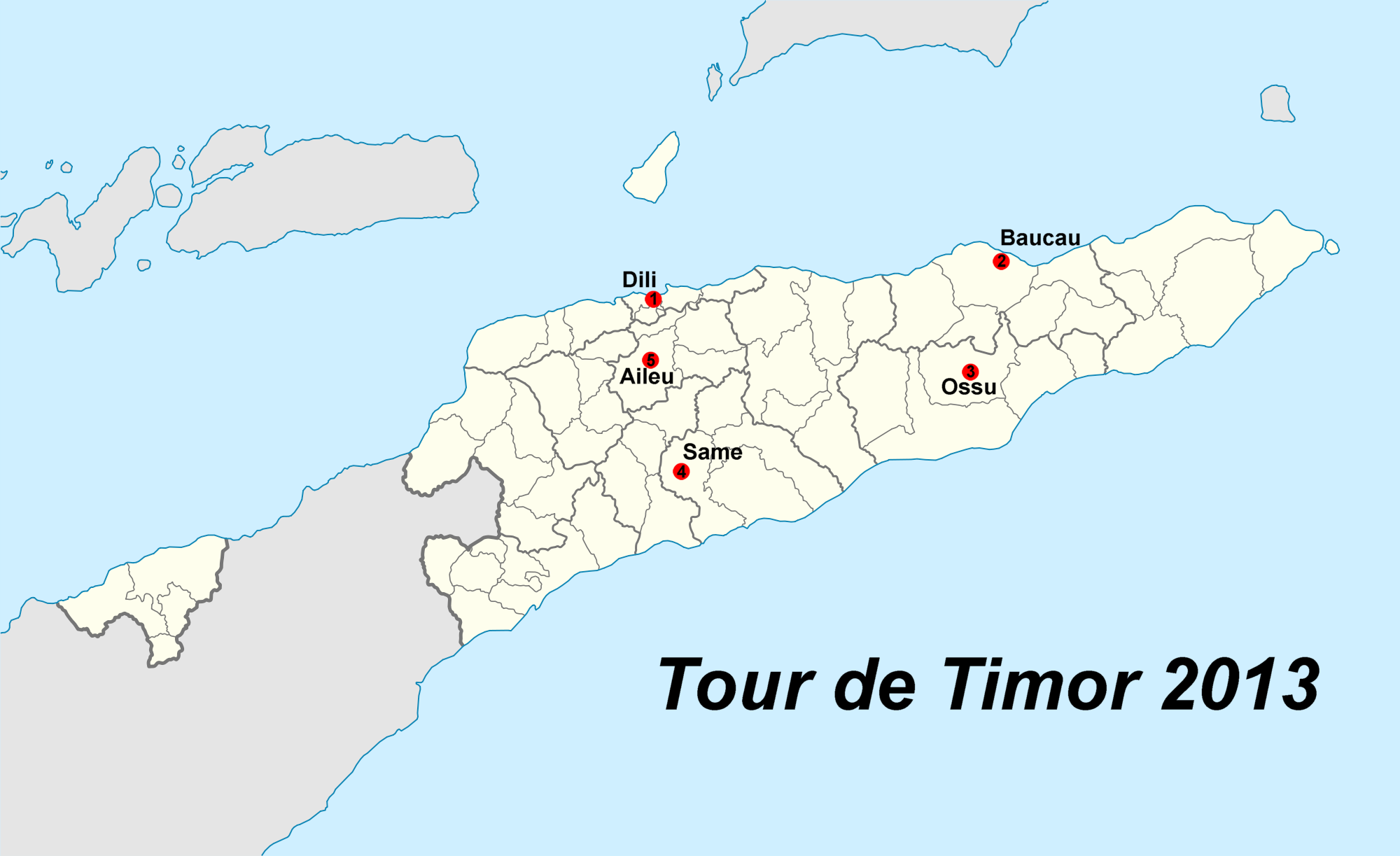
Tour de Timor 2013

== 2018 event ==
Category	Winner	Overall Time	Nationality
Male	David Vaz	15:03:12	Portugal
Female	Gina Ricardo	18:08:51	Australia
