= 2020 UCI Women's ProSeries =

- First edition of the UCI Women's ProSeries

Details
- Dates: 16 January – 4 October 2020
- Location: Europe, Australia
- Races: 7

The 2020 UCI Women's ProSeries was the first season of the second-tier UCI Women's ProSeries road cycling tour, which sits below the UCI Women's World Tour but above the UCI Class 1 and Class 2 races.

The 2020 calendar initially consisted of eight events, four one-day races (1.Pro) and four stage races (2.Pro). As a result of the COVID-19 pandemic, the season was heavily disrupted, with only two events being held – the season-opening Women's Tour Down Under stage race in Australia prior to the emergence of the pandemic, and the Giro dell'Emilia Internazionale Donne Elite in August.

== Events ==
Races in the 2020 UCI Women's ProSeries
Race	Date	Winner	Team	Ref.
(Australia) Women's Tour Down Under	16–17 January	Ruth Edwards (USA)	Trek–Segafredo	
(Luxembourg) Festival Elsy Jacobs	8–10 May	Cancelled		
(Spain) Vuelta a Burgos Feminas	21–24 May	Cancelled		
(Germany) Thüringen Ladies Tour	26–31 May	Cancelled		
(Spain) Donostia San Sebastian Emakumeen Klasikoa	25 July	Cancelled		
(United Kingdom) RideLondon Classique	15 August	Cancelled		
(Italy) Giro dell'Emilia Internazionale Donne Elite	18 August	Cecilie Uttrup Ludwig (DEN)	FDJ Nouvelle-Aquitaine Futuroscope	
(Italy) Gran Premio Bruno Beghelli Internazionale Donne Elite	4 October	Cancelled		
