= Lauren Stephens =

American cyclist (born 1986)

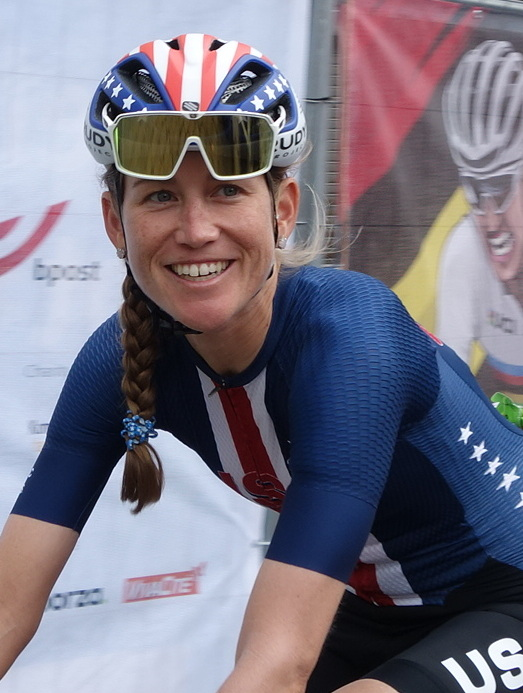
- Stephens at the 2021 UCI Road World Championships

Personal information
- Full name: Lauren Michelle Stephens
- Born: Lauren Michelle Robertson; December 28, 1986 (age 39) Mesquite, Texas, United States

Cycling career
- Sport: Cycling
- Current team: Cynisca Cycling
- Discipline: Road
- Role: Rider

Amateur team
- 2010–2013: FCS–Rouse p/b Mr. Restore

Professional teams
- 2013–2017: Team TIBCO–To The Top
- 2018: Cylance Pro Cycling
- 2019–2023: Tibco–Silicon Valley Bank
- 2024–: Cynisca Cycling

Major wins
- One-day races and Classics National Road Race Championships (2021) Pan American Road Race Championships (2024)
Medal record
Women's road bicycle racing
Representing United States
Pan American Games
Gold medal – first place	2023 Santiago	Road race
Pan American Championships
Gold medal – first place	2024 São José dos Campos	Road race
Silver medal – second place	2018 San Juan	Time trial
Silver medal – second place	2024 São José dos Campos	Time trial

Lauren Michelle Stephens (née Robertson; born December 28, 1986) is an American racing cyclist, who currently rides for UCI Women's Continental Team Cynisca Cycling. She raced the Team Time Trial at the 2014 UCI Road World Championships.

== Major results ==
2013
7th Philadelphia Cycling Classic
2014
3rd White Spot / Delta Road Race
4th Overall Belgium Tour
8th Winston-Salem Cycling Classic
2015
1st Overall Joe Martin Stage Race

1st Stage 1 (ITT)

2nd Overall Tour Femenino de San Luis

1st Stage 4 (ITT)

2nd Overall Tour de Feminin-O cenu Českého Švýcarska

1st Points classification

2nd Overall Tour Cycliste Féminin International de l'Ardèche

1st Stage 1 (ITT)

3rd Overall Tour of the Gila

1st Stage 3 (ITT)

3rd Overall Thüringen Rundfahrt der Frauen
4th Time trial, National Road Championships
4th Overall Armed Forces Association Cycling Classic

1st Clarendon Cup

5th Chrono Gatineau
6th Gran Prix San Luis Femenino
7th Winston-Salem Cycling Classic
8th Overall Women's Tour of New Zealand
8th Overall Tour of California
2016
1st Matrix Challenge Criterium 1
1st Stage 4 (ITT) Tour Femenino de San Luis
3rd Overall Joe Martin Stage Race

1st Stage 4

4th Overall Tour Femenino de San Luis

1st Stage 4 (ITT)

4th Chrono Gatineau
5th Time trial, National Road Championships
6th North Star Grand Prix
7th Overall Tour of the Gila
10th Overall Tour of California
2017
1st Chrono Gatineau
1st Winston-Salem Cycling Classic
Matrix Challenge

1st Criteriums 1 & 2

1st Stage 3 (ITT) Tour Cycliste Féminin International de l'Ardèche
1st Stage 4 (ITT) Thüringen Rundfahrt der Frauen
National Road Championships

2nd Time trial
2nd Criterium
6th Road race

2nd Overall Joe Martin Stage Race
3rd Overall Valley of the Sun Stage Race
5th Overall Tour of the Gila
5th Grand Prix Cycliste de Gatineau
6th Dana Point Grand Prix
7th Overall Tour of California
7th GP de Plouay – Bretagne
7th La Course by Le Tour de France
8th UCI Road World Championships – Women's time trial
9th Overall Redlands Bicycle Classic

1st Stage 3

2018
1st GP Jodofi
1st reVolta
2nd Time trial, Pan American Road Championships
2nd Overall Women's Tour Down Under
2019
1st Unbound Gravel 100
7th Overall Women's Tour Down Under
7th Overall Colorado Classic
7th Winston-Salem Cycling Classic
9th Overall Tour Cycliste Féminin International de l'Ardèche
9th Chrono Gatineau
10th Tour of Guangxi
2020
1st Overall Tour Cycliste Féminin International de l'Ardèche

1st Points classification
1st Combination classification

4th Overall Women's Tour Down Under
4th Race Torquay
4th UCI Esports World Championships
6th Gent–Wevelgem
7th Cadel Evans Great Ocean Road Race
9th UCI Road World Championships – Women's time trial
9th Tour of Flanders for Women
10th Brabantse Pijl Dames Gooik
2021
1st Road race, National Road Championships
1st Unbound Gravel 100
10th Gent–Wevelgem
2022
National Road Championships

3rd Road race
3rd Time trial

2023
Pan American Games

1st Road race
4th Time trial

1st Overall Joe Martin Stage Race

1st Mountains classification
1st Stage 3

National Road Championships

2nd Time trial
4th Road race

4th Chrono Féminin de la Gatineau
6th UCI Gravel World Championships
8th Time trial, Pan American Road Championships
2024
Pan American Road Championships

1st Road race
2nd Time trial

1st Overall Tour of the Gila

1st Mountains classification
1st Stages 1 & 3 (ITT)

1st Clásica de Almería
1st Rattlesnake Gravel Grind
1st Unbound Gravel 100
National Road Championships

4th Road race
5th Time trial

6th Overall Tour de Normandie féminin
