= Emma Langley =

American cyclist (born 1995)

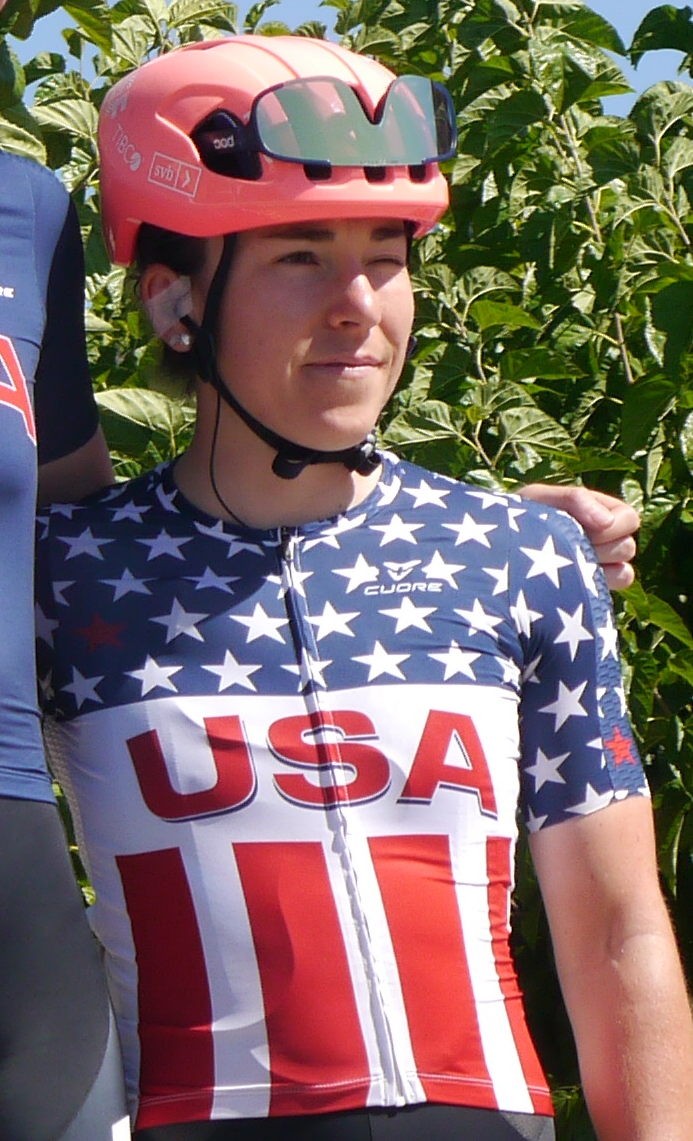

Personal information
- Born: 23 November 1995 (age 30) England

Cycling career
- Sport: Cycling
- Current team: Virginia's Blue Ridge–Twenty28
- Discipline: Road
- Role: Rider
- Rider type: All-rounder

Professional teams
- 2020: Team Illuminate
- 2021–2023: Tibco–Silicon Valley Bank
- 2024–: Virginia's Blue Ridge–Twenty24

Major wins
- One-day races and classics National Road Race Championships (2022)

Emma Langley (born 23 November 1995) is an American professional road racing cyclist who currently rides for UCI Women's Continental Team Virginia's Blue Ridge–Twenty28.

Langley was born in England, and lived during her childhood in Saudi Arabia, South Africa, and Sweden, before moving to the United States. After competing in swimming and triathlons, she began competing predominantly in cycling, including a collegiate career at the College of William & Mary. After a seventh-place finish in the 2019 United States National Road Race Championships as an unaffiliated rider, she signed with EF Education–Tibco–SVB.

Langley began her professional racing career with EF Education–Tibco–SVB in 2021, where she scored two stage wins in the 2021 Joe Martin Stage Race, winning the mountains classification as well.

Langley won the individual time trial stage 3 of the 2022 Joe Martin Stage Race WE (2.2), and defended the overall leader's pink jersey through the final criterium stage to take the general classification. Langley earned the title of National Champion after winning the 2022 USA Cycling Road Race National Championship held in Knoxville, Tennessee as a member of UCI Women's WorldTeam EF Education–Tibco–SVB. She represented Team USA in the road race at the 2022 UCI Road World Championships in Wollongong, New South Wales, Australia.

== Major results ==
2021
6th Overall Joe Martin Stage Race

1st Mountains Classification
1st Stage 2
1st Stage 3 (ITT)

2022
1st Road race, National Road Championships
1st Overall Joe Martin Stage Race

1st Stage 3 (ITT)

6th Overall Tour Cycliste Féminin International de l'Ardèche
8th Overall Tour of the Gila
9th Overall Tour Féminin International des Pyrénées
