= 2014 White Spot / Delta Road Race =

Cycling race in Tsawwassen, Canada

Race details
- Dates: 6 July 2014
- Stages: 1
- Distance: 93.04 km (57.81 mi)
- Winning time: 2h 25' 08"

Results
	Winner	Leah Kirchmann (CAN)	(Team Optum p/b Kelly Benefit Strategies)
	Second	Samantha Schneider (USA)	(Team TIBCO - To The Top)
	Third	Lauren Stephens (USA)	(Team TIBCO - To The Top)

The 2014 White Spot / Delta Road Race was a one-day women's cycle race held in Tsawwassen, British Columbia, Canada on 6 July 2014. The race has an UCI rating of 1.2.

== Result ==
	Rider	Team	Time
1	Leah Kirchmann (CAN)	Team Optum p/b Kelly Benefit Strategies	2h 25' 08"
2	Samantha Schneider (USA)	Team TIBCO - To The Top	s.t.
3	Lauren Stephens (USA)	Team TIBCO - To The Top	s.t.
4	Sara Headley (USA)	Team TIBCO - To The Top	s.t.
5	Kate Chilcott (NZL)	Vanderkitten	s.t.
6	María Luisa Calle (COL)	Louis Garneau Factory Team	s.t.
7	Elle Anderson (USA)	Vanderkitten	s.t.
8	Amy Cutler (USA)	Louis Garneau Factory Team	s.t.
9	Alison Jackson (CAN)	Team TIBCO - To The Top	s.t.
10	Joanne Kiesanowski (NZL)	Team TIBCO - To The Top	s.t.
