= 2020 Tour Cycliste Féminin International de l'Ardèche =

Race details
- Dates: 3–9 September 2020
- Stages: 7 stages
- Distance: 843.9 km (524.4 mi)

The 2020 Tour Cycliste Féminin International de l'Ardèche is a women's cycle stage race held in France from 3 September to 9 September, 2020. The tour has an UCI rating of 2.1.

== Stages ==
List of stages
Stage	Date	Course	Distance	Type	Winner	Team
1	3 September	Saint-Marcel-d'Ardèche to Bourg-Saint-Andéol	90.3 km (56.1 mi)	Flat stage	Mavi García (ESP)	Alé BTC Ljubljana
2	4 September	Saint-Georges-les-Bains to Font d'Urle	135.6 km (84.3 mi)	Mountain stage	Mavi García (ESP)	Alé BTC Ljubljana
3	5 September	Avignon to Avignon	113.4 km (70.5 mi)	Flat stage	Audrey Cordon-Ragot (FRA)	Trek–Segafredo
4	6 September	Meyrueis to Mont Lozère	133.6 km (83.0 mi)	Mountain stage	Kristen Faulkner (USA)	Tibco–Silicon Valley Bank
5	7 September	Pont du Gard to Ruoms	134.5 km (83.6 mi)	Flat stage	Leigh Ann Ganzar (USA)	Rally Cycling
6	8 September	Valréas to Rochemaure	137.9 km (85.7 mi)	Mountain stage	Pauline Allin (FRA)	Arkéa Pro Cycling Team
7	9 September	Savasse to Beauchastel	98.6 km (61.3 mi)	Flat stage	Chloe Hosking (AUS)	Rally Cycling
Total			843.9 km (524.4 mi)			

== Classification leadership ==
Stage	Winner	General classification	Young rider classification	Points classification	Mountains classification	Sprints classification	Combination classification	Combativity classification	Teams classification
1	Mavi García	Mavi García	Inge van der Heijden	Mavi García	Mavi García	Emma White	Mavi García	Maaike Boogaard	Alé BTC Ljubljana
2	Mavi García	Mavi García	Camilla Alessio	Mavi García	Mavi García	Emma White	Mavi García	Eri Yonamine	Alé BTC Ljubljana
3	Audrey Cordon-Ragot	Mavi García	Camilla Alessio	Mavi García	Mavi García	Emma White	Mavi García	Silvia Valsecchi	Alé BTC Ljubljana
4	Kristen Faulkner	Mavi García	Camilla Alessio	Mavi García	Mavi García	Emma White	Kristen Faulkner	Mireia Benito	Alé BTC Ljubljana
5	Leigh Ann Ganzar	Lauren Stephens	Camilla Alessio	Mavi García	Mavi García	Emma White	Lauren Stephens	Lauren Stephens	Alé BTC Ljubljana
6	Pauline Allin	Lauren Stephens	Camilla Alessio	Lauren Stephens	Mavi García	Emma White	Lauren Stephens	Eyeru Tesfoam Gebru	Alé BTC Ljubljana
7	Chloe Hosking	Lauren Stephens	Camilla Alessio	Lauren Stephens	Yara Kastelijn	Emma White	Lauren Stephens	Tereza Medveďová	Alé BTC Ljubljana
Final		Lauren Stephens	Camilla Alessio	Lauren Stephens	Yara Kastelijn	Emma White	Lauren Stephens	Maeva Squiban	Alé BTC Ljubljana
