= Jess Pratt =

Australian cyclist

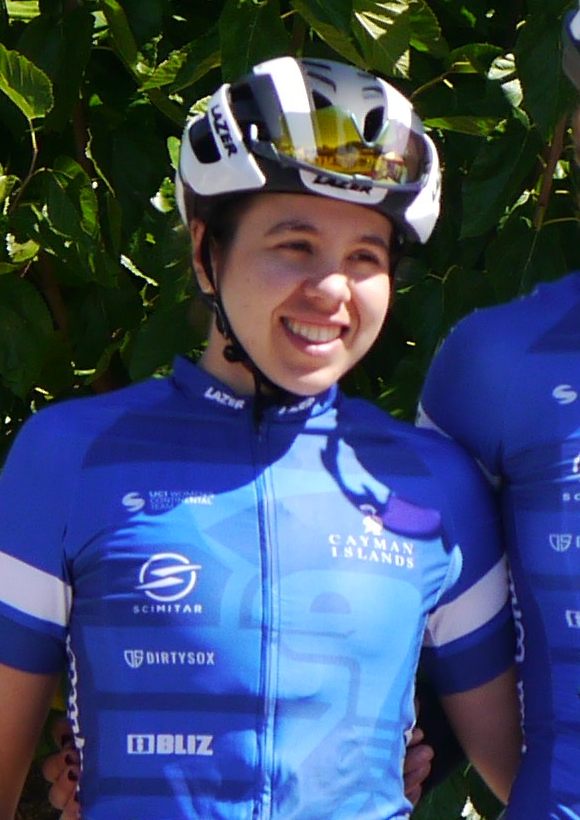
- Jessica Pratt (2022)

Personal information
- Full name: Jessica Pratt
- Born: 9 October 1997 (age 29) Greenville, Michigan, U.S.

Cycling career
- Sport: Cycling
- Discipline: Road
- Role: Rider

Amateur teams
- 2017: High5 Dream Team
- 2019: Sydney Uni–Staminade

Professional team
- 2020: Canyon//SRAM

Jessica Pratt (born 9 October 1997) is an American-born Australian professional racing cyclist, who most recently rode for UCI Women's WorldTeam Canyon//SRAM.

Outside of cycling, Pratt is a registered nurse.

== Major results ==
2014
Oceania Junior Road Championships

2nd Road race
5th Time trial

2015
1st Road race, National Junior Road Championships
Oceania Junior Road Championships

3rd Road race
4th Time trial

9th Road race, UCI Junior Road World Championships
2017
1st Stage 5 Tour Cycliste Féminin International de l'Ardèche
4th Road race, Oceania Road Championships
2020
9th Overall Women's Tour Down Under
