= Peta Mullens =

Australian cyclist (born 1988)

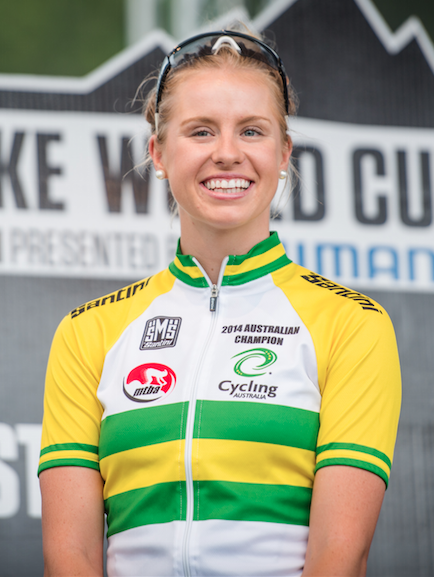
- Mullens in 2014

Personal information
- Full name: Peta Mullens
- Nickname: Pesta
- Born: 8 March 1988 (age 38) Sale, Victoria, Australia
- Height: 172 cm (5 ft 8 in)
- Weight: 58 kg (128 lb)

Cycling career
- Sport: Cycling
- Current team: Liv Brazilian Butterfly Racing
- Disciplines: Road; Mountain biking; Cyclo-cross
- Role: Rider
- Rider type: All-rounder

Amateur teams
- 2009: HP–Teschner
- 2016: Roxsolt
- 2016: Moroni's Bikes
- 2016: Rapha Cycling Club
- 2017: Focus Attaquer (off-road)
- 2019-2023: Roxsolt Attaquer (road)
- 2024-: Liv Brazilian Butterfly Racing (off-road)

Professional teams
- 2014–2016: Wiggle–Honda
- 2017–2018: Hagens Berman–Supermint
- 2020–2023: Roxsolt Attaquer

Peta Mullens (born 8 March 1988) is an Australian racing cyclist, who currently rides for Liv Brazilian Butterfly Racing. She is a former Australian road, MTB and cyclo-cross champion.

Less than 24 hours after taking victory in the 2015 Australian National Road Race Championships, Mullens re-signed with Wiggle–Honda. She has also competed professionally with the Hagens Berman–Supermint team. She was co-owner of team Roxsolt from 2019-2023 when the team folded. In 2024 she has been selected to race the US off-road series Lifetime Grand Prix.

== Major results ==
2002
1st National Under-18 Mountain Running Championships
2004
3rd Individual pursuit, National Youth Track Championships
3rd Individual pursuit, Junior Oceania Games
2005
3rd Individual pursuit, National Junior Track Championships
2006
1st Individual pursuit, National Junior Track Championships
3rd Individual pursuit, UCI Juniors World Championships
3rd Overall Tour of Southern Grampians
2007
1st Overall Tour of Southern Grampians

1st Stages 1, 2 & 4

3rd Road race, Oceania Games
3rd Overall Canberra Tour

1st Stage 3

3rd Overall UniSA Women's Criterium Series
2008
1st Overall Tour of Southern Grampians

1st Stage 2

7th Sparkassen Giro Bochum
2009
National Road Championships

1st Under-23 road race
3rd Under-23 criterium
7th Road race

2nd Cross-country marathon, National Mountain Bike Championships
4th Road race, Oceania Road Championships
9th Wellington Women's Race
2010
3rd Criterium, National Road Championships
2011
1st Overall Tour de Timor
7th Road race, Oceania Road Championships
7th Cross-country, Oceania Mountain Bike Championships
2012
1st Cross-country marathon, National Mountain Bike Championships
2013
1st Cross-country, National Mountain Bike Championships
1st Round 2, NSW International Grand Prix criterium series – Wollongong
National Mountain Bike Series

1st Mount Buller
2nd Thredbo

10th Road race, National Road Championships
2014
National Mountain Bike Championships

1st Cross-country eliminator
2nd Cross-country

1st Points classification Bay Classic Series
2nd Criterium, National Road Championships
National Mountain Bike Series

2nd Moama
3rd Eagle Park

4th Cross-country eliminator, UCI Mountain Bike World Cup, Nové Město na Moravě
6th GP Comune di Cornaredo
2015
National Road Championships

1st Road race
2nd Criterium

1st National Mountain Bike Series, Pemberton
National Mountain Bike Championships

2nd Cross-country eliminator
2nd Cross-country

6th Overall Bay Classic Series

1st Stage 3

2016
2nd Cross-country, Oceania Mountain Bike Championships
2nd Cross-country, National Mountain Bike Championships
2nd National Cyclo-cross Championships
10th Cadel Evans Great Ocean Road Race
2017
1st National Cyclo-cross Championships
1st Melbourne Grand Prix of Cyclocross
5th Winston-Salem Cycling Classic
6th Overall Santos Women's Tour
2018
9th White Spot / Delta Road Race
2019
1st National Cyclo-cross Championships
1st Melbourne to Warrnambool Classic
2020
1st National Criterium Series
National Mountain Bike Championships

2nd Cross-country
2nd Cross-country short track

National Road Championships

7th Road race
7th Criterium

7th Race Torquay
10th Overall Women's Tour Down Under
2021
1st Stage 1 Santos Festival of Cyling
National Road Championships

31st Road race
30th Criterium

2022
National Road Championships

3rd Road race
23rd Criterium

2023
National Road Championships

16th Road race
34th Criterium

1st Otway Odyssey
National Mountain Bike Championships

1st XC Marathon
3rd Cross-country
3rd Enduro
4th Cross-country short track

2nd National Gravel Championships
3rd National Cyclocross Championships
2024
National Road Championships

18th Road race
7th Criterium

1st Snowies MTB Festival
National Mountain Bike Championships

4th XC Marathon

4th UCI Gravel World Series; SEVEN
