= Joe Martin Stage Race =

American multi-day road cycling race

Race details
- Region: Fayetteville, Arkansas
- Discipline: Road
- Competition: UCI America Tour
- Type: Stage race
- Web site: joemartinstagerace.com

History
- First edition: 1978
- Editions: Men: 45 (as of 2023); Women: 16 (as of 2023)
- Most wins: Men: Rory Sutherland (AUS) (3 wins); Women: Lynn Gaggioli-Brotzman (USA) (3 wins)
- Most recent: Men: Riley Sheehan (USA); Women: Lauren Stephens (USA)

Joe Martin Stage Race was a road cycling stage race held annually in Fayetteville, Arkansas between 1978 and 2023. It was part of the UCI America Tour in category 2.2. Created in 1978 under the name of Fayetteville Spring Classic, it was renamed the Joe Martin Stage Race in 1989 in honor of the race director Joe Martin, who died that year. The organisers have announced that they are now focused on delivering a new race, the Tour of Arkansas, from 2026.

== Men's race ==
=== Winners (since 1996) ===
Year	Country	Rider	Team
1996	United States	Thurlow Rogers	
1997	United States	Kevin Ross	
1998	United States	Shane Thellman	
1999	United States	John Matthews	
2000	United States	Erin Hartwell	
2001	United States	Steven Cate	
2002	Guatemala	Gustavo Carrillo	
2003	United States	Jason McCartney	7Up-Maxxis
2004	United States	Adam Bergman	Jelly Belly-Aramark
2005	United States	Scott Moninger	Health Net–Maxxis
2006	Canada	Gord Fraser	Health Net–Maxxis
2007	Australia	Rory Sutherland	Health Net–Maxxis
2008	Australia	Rory Sutherland	Health Net–Maxxis
2009	Australia	Rory Sutherland	OUCH–Maxxis
2010	Cuba	Luis Amarán	Jamis–Sutter Home
2011	United States	Frank Pipp	Bissell
2012	Spain	Francisco Mancebo	CompetitiveCyclist.com
2013	United States	Chad Haga	Optum–Kelly Benefit Strategies
2014	United States	Ian Crane	Jamis–Hagens Berman
2015	United States	John Murphy	UnitedHealthcare
2016	United States	Neilson Powless	Axeon–Hagens Berman
2017	United States	Robin Carpenter	Holowesko Citadel Racing Team
2018	Cuba	Rubén Companioni	Holowesko Citadel p/b Arapahoe Resources
2019	United States	Stephen Bassett	First Internet Bank
2020	No race due to the COVID-19 pandemic		
2021	United States	Tyler Williams	L39ION of Los Angeles
2022	Australia	Jonathan Clarke	Wildlife Generation Pro Cycling
2023	United States	Riley Sheehan	Denver Disruptors

=== Classification jerseys ===
General classification leader
Points classification leader
Under 23 classification leader

== Women's race ==
=== Race winners ===
Year	Country	Rider	Team
2003	United States	Lynn Gaggioli-Brotzman	
2004	United States	Lynn Gaggioli-Brotzman	T-Mobile Professional Cycling Team
2005	United States	Lynn Gaggioli-Brotzman	SC Michela Fanini Record Rox
2006	Canada	Erinne Willock	
2007	United States	Katharine Carroll	
2008	United States	Robin Farina	
2009	United States	Alison Powers	
2010	United States	Alison Powers	Vera Bradley Foundation
2011–2014	No race		
2015	United States	Lauren Stephens	Team TIBCO–SVB
2016	United States	Coryn Rivera	UnitedHealthcare
2017	United States	Ruth Winder	UnitedHealthcare
2018	United States	Katie Hall	UnitedHealthcare
2019	United States	Chloé Dygert	Sho-Air TWENTY20
2020	No race due to the COVID-19 pandemic		
2021	United States	Skylar Schneider	L39ION of Los Angeles
2022	United States	Emma Langley	EF Education–Tibco–SVB
2023	United States	Lauren Stephens	EF Education–Tibco–SVB

=== Classification jerseys ===
General classification leader
Points classification leader
Under 23 classification leader
