= Roxsolt Liv SRAM =

Australian cycling team

Team information
- UCI code: ROX (2013–2019); RXS (2020–)
- Registered: Australia
- Founded: 2013
- Status: National (2013–2019); UCI Women's Continental Team (2020–)

Team name history
- 2013–2018 2019–2020 2021–: Roxsolt; Roxsolt Attaquer; Roxsolt Liv SRAM

Roxsolt Liv SRAM is an Australian women's road bicycle racing team which participates in elite women's races. The team was established in 2013.

== Team roster ==
As of 3 February 2021.

Rider	Date of birth
Justine Barrow (AUS)	7 March 1979 (age 47)
Saffron Button (AUS)	25 June 1996 (age 30)
Emma Chilton (AUS)	10 June 1998 (age 28)
Izzy Flint (AUS)	16 May 2002 (age 24)
Emily Herfoss (AUS)	24 July 1994 (age 32)
Nicola Macdonald (AUS)	2 June 1998 (age 28)

Rider	Date of birth
Peta Mullens (AUS)	8 March 1988 (age 38)
Franky Sewell (AUS)	18 December 2002 (age 23)
Courtney Sherwell (AUS)	6 July 1988 (age 38)
Carlee Taylor (AUS)	15 February 1989 (age 37)
Bree Wilson (AUS)	21 June 1987 (age 39)
Madeline Wright (AUS)	21 August 1985 (age 41)

== Major results ==
2021
Zombie Park #1 Adelaide Cyclo-cross, Isabella Flint
Zombie Park #2 Adelaide Cyclo-cross, Isabella Flint

== National Champions ==
2016
New Zealand U23 Time Trial, Georgia Catterick

2019
Australia Road Race, Sarah Gigante
