= EF Education–Tibco–SVB =

American cycling team

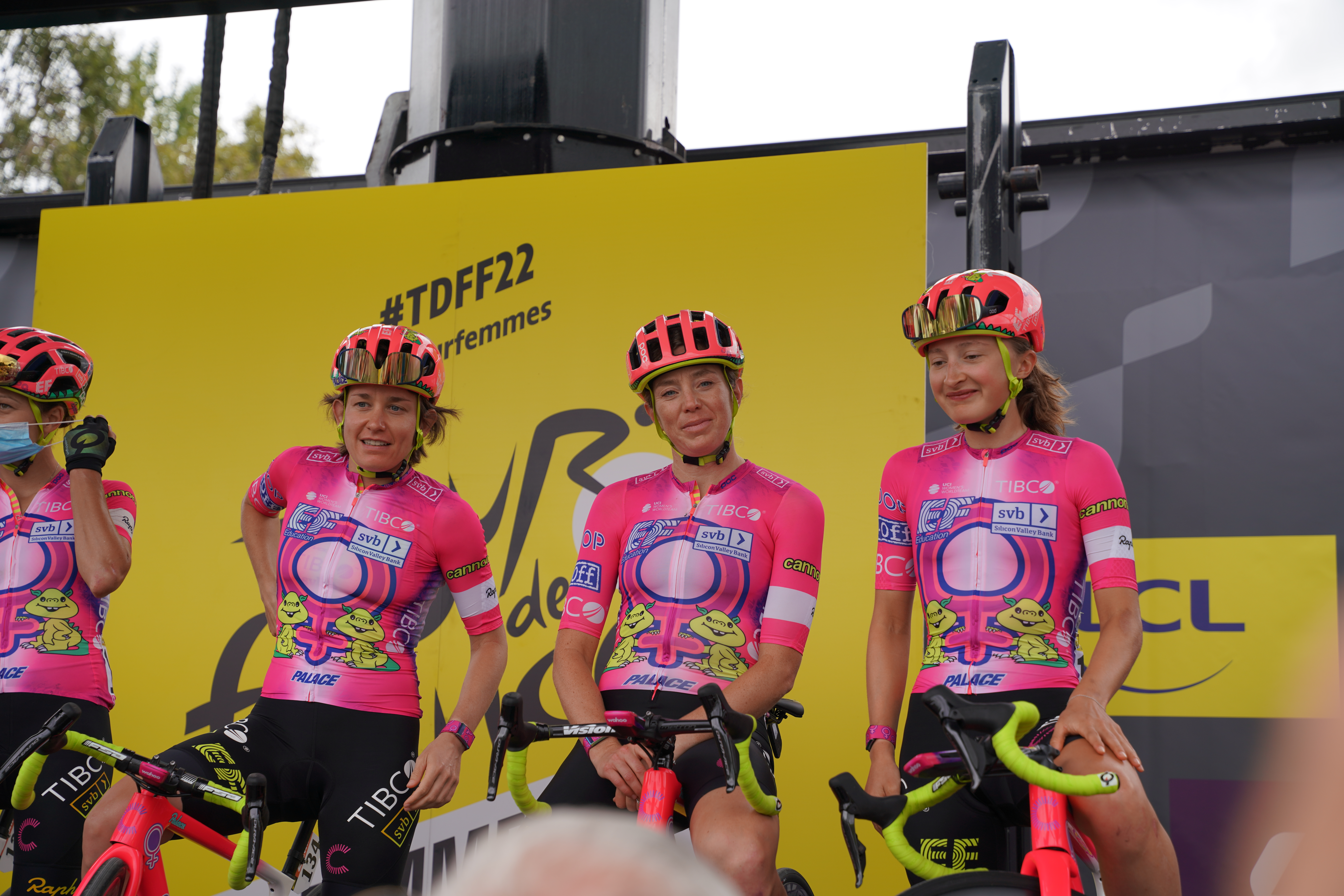
- Riders at the 2022 Tour de France Femmes

Team information
- UCI code: TIB
- Registered: United States
- Founded: 2006
- Disbanded: 2023
- Discipline: Road
- Status: UCI Women's Team (2010–2019); UCI Women's Continental Team (2020–2021); UCI Women's WorldTeam (2022–2023)

Key personnel
- Team manager: Linda Jackson

Team name history
- 2006 2007–2009 2010–2014 2015 2016–2021 2022–2023: PABW Powered by TIBCO; Team TIBCO; Team TIBCO–To The Top; Team TIBCO–SVB; Tibco–Silicon Valley Bank; EF Education–Tibco–SVB

EF Education–Tibco–SVB is a former women's professional cycling team based in the United States that competed in elite road bicycle racing. The team's main sponsors were EF Education First, TIBCO Software and Silicon Valley Bank. The owner was Linda Jackson, a former professional cyclist.

== Team history ==
Before its demise in 2023, Team EF Education–Tibco–SVB was the longest running women's professional cycling team in North America and traced its roots back to the Palo Alto Bicycles Women's (PABW) team. The team was created by Stanford MBA and investment banker, Linda Jackson. Jackson left investment banking in the early 90s to pursue her dream of becoming an Olympian. After becoming Canada's National Champion in 1995, Jackson was selected to represent Canada in the time trial and road race at the 1996 Atlanta Games. She went on to win the bronze medal at the 1996 World Championship Road Race in Lugano, Switzerland and accumulated numerous Canadian national championship titles in the road race and time trial. Cycling gave Jackson so much personally, that when she retired from the sport, she knew she wanted to help other women pursue their cycling aspirations.

Jackson became involved with PABW on a coaching basis in 2004, directed the team in 2005 and then added TIBCO as a sponsor in 2005 in order to help the team grow from a local racing team to a national-level team. Racing as PABW powered by TIBCO in 2006, the team finished the year ranked 36th overall in North America, up from 60th overall the year before. The following year, Jackson added Silicon Valley Bank as a sponsor. Jackson also created the Silicon Valley Cycling Foundation; a 501c3 formed to help develop promising female cyclists into top international competitors. The team soon rose to the top of the North American peloton and then began an expansion into International racing.

In 2008, the Team won both the National Road Race and Criterium (Brooke Miller) and was ranked 4th overall in North America. In 2009, the team became the top team in North America, won the National Road Race (Meredith Miller) and was named Team of the Year by VeloNews. In 2010, the team expanded to racing in Europe. In 2012, Team TIBCO won the National Road Race for the third time in five years with Megan Guarnier. In 2013 and 2014 the team repeated as the top team in North America. In 2015 Silicon Valley Bank became a co-title sponsor and the team added significantly more international events to its race calendar.

In 2017, the Team added four more National Championships to its tally with both Íngrid Drexel (Mexico) and Nicolle Bruderer (Guatemala) scoring double wins in the road race and time trial. 2018 started off with yet another national championship win; this time with new recruit Shannon Malseed winning the Australia National championship road race. In 2019, the team won the Australian national road race championship again, this time with new recruit Sarah Gigante. In 2020, Gigante won another national championship title, this time winning the Australian national time trial championships.

In 2022, the team joined the UCI Women's World Tour and became known as EF Education–Tibco–SVB. During that season, Emma Langley secured overall victory in the 2022 Joe Martin Stage Race after winning the stage 3 time trial, and the team successfully defending the jersey through the final day's criterium stage.

In 2023, Alison Jackson won Paris–Roubaix Femmes in a sprint finish after the break stayed away from the chasing pack – with the team describing the win as the biggest in their history.

At the end of 2023 both SVB and Tibco stopped their sponsorship. EF Education then announced a new women's team (EF Education–Cannondale). Veronica Ewers was announced as signing for the new EF Education–Cannondale team. In August 2023 it was officially confirmed that the team will disband at the end of 2023.

== Final team roster ==
As of December 31, 2023.

Rider	Date of birth
Lizzy Banks (GBR)	November 7, 1990 (age 35)
Letizia Borghesi (ITA)	October 16, 1998 (age 27)
Krista Doebel-Hickok (USA)	April 28, 1989 (age 37)
Veronica Ewers (USA)	September 1, 1994 (age 32)
Kathrin Hammes (GER)	January 9, 1989 (age 37)
Clara Honsinger (USA)	June 5, 1997 (age 29)

Rider	Date of birth
Alison Jackson (CAN)	December 14, 1988 (age 37)
Emma Langley (USA)	November 23, 1995 (age 30)
Sara Poidevin (CAN)	May 7, 1996 (age 30)
Omer Shapira (ISR)	September 9, 1994 (age 31)
Lauren Stephens (USA)	December 28, 1986 (age 39)
Georgia Williams (NZL)	August 25, 1993 (age 33)

== Major wins ==
2008
United States National Road Race Championships, Brooke Miller
2009
United States National Road Race Championships, Meredith Miller
2010
Sprints classification Tour de l'Aude Cycliste Féminin, Brooke Miller
Stage 4 Cascade Cycling Classic, Jo Kiesanowski
Stage 2 Tour Cycliste Féminin International de l'Ardèche, Ruth Corset
Gloucester Cyclo-cross, Meredith Miller
Providence Cyclo-cross, Meredith Miller
Iowa City Cyclo-cross, Meredith Miller
Iowa City Cyclo-cross, Amanda Miller
2011
Overall UCI Track World Cup (Beijing) Omnium, Tara Whitten

Individual Pursuit, Tara Whitten

Overall Giro della Toscana Int. Femminile – Memorial Michela Fanini, Megan Guarnier
Iowa City Cyclo-cross, Meredith Miller
Iowa City Cyclo-cross, Meredith Miller
Los Angeles Cyclo-cross, Meredith Miller
Los Angeles Cyclo-cross, Meredith Miller
2012
Prologue The Exergy Tour, Tara Whitten
2013
Overall Joe Martin Stage Race, Claudia Häusler

Prologue, Claudia Häusler

Stage 6 Nature Valley Grand Prix, Claudia Häusler
Stage 1 Cascade Cycling Classic, Claudia Häusler
Chrono Gatineau, Shelley Olds
Madison Cup (Points race), Rushlee Buchanan
Challenge International sur piste (Points race), Jasmin Glaesser
Challenge International sur piste (Scratch), Rushlee Buchanan
Overall Giro della Toscana Int. Femminile – Memorial Michela Fanini, Claudia Häusler
Saint Louis Cyclo-cross, Amanda Miller
2014
Tour of America's Dairyland – Giro d'Grafton, Samantha Schneider
Overall Cascade Cycling Classic, Lauren Stephens

Mountains classification, Andrea Dvorak
Prologue, Stages 1 & 2, Lauren Stephens
Stage 3, Kristabel Doebel-Hickok
Stage 4, Jo Kiesanowski

2015
Stage 4 (ITT) Tour Femenino de San Luis, Lauren Stephens
Mountains classification Women's Tour of New Zealand, Joanne Hogan
Overall Joe Martin Stage Race, Lauren Stephens

Stage 1 (ITT), Lauren Stephens

Stage 3 (ITT) Tour of the Gila, Lauren Stephens
Points classification Tour de Feminin-O cenu Českého Švýcarska, Lauren Stephens

Stage 5, Kristabel Doebel-Hickok

Stage 2 Tour Cycliste Féminin International de l'Ardèche, Lauren Stephens
Stage 5 Tour Cycliste Féminin International de l'Ardèche, Kristabel Doebel-Hickok
2016
Stage 4 (ITT) Tour Femenino de San Luis, Lauren Stephens
Stage 4 Joe Martin Stage Race, Lauren Stephens
2017
Stage 2 Tour of the Gila, Lex Albrecht
Chrono Gatineau, Lauren Stephens
Winston-Salem Cycling Classic, Lauren Stephens
Stage 2 Thüringen Rundfahrt der Frauen, Lex Albrecht
Stage 4 (ITT) Thüringen Rundfahrt der Frauen, Lauren Stephens
Combativity award Stage 5 Tour Cycliste Féminin International de l'Ardèche, Lex Albrecht
2018
Stage 5 Redlands Bicycle Classic, Emma Grant
Stage 3 Valley of the Sun Stage Race, Kendall Ryan
Stage 1 Tour of California, Kendall Ryan
Overall Armed Forces Association Cycling Classic, Kendall Ryan

Clarendon Cup, Kendall Ryan

2019
Stage 2 Joe Martin Stage Race, Shannon Malseed
Overall Tour of the Gila, Brodie Chapman

Stages 1 & 5, Brodie Chapman

White Spot / Delta Road Race, Alison Jackson
Stage 2 Tour de Feminin-O cenu Českého Švýcarska, Brodie Chapman
Stage 2 Women's Tour of Scotland, Alison Jackson
2020
Overall Tour Cycliste Féminin International de l'Ardèche, Lauren Stephens

Points classification, Lauren Stephens
Stage 4, Kristen Faulkner

2021
Stage 1 Ladies Tour of Norway, Kristen Faulkner
Stages 2 & 3 (ITT) Joe Martin Stage Race, Emma Langley
2022
Mountains classification Tour of the Gila Kristabel Doebel-Hickok

Team classification
Stages 1 & 3 (ITT), Kristabel Doebel-Hickok

Stage 2 Grand Prix Elsy Jacobs, Veronica Ewers
Overall 2022 Joe Martin Stage Race, Emma Langley

Stage 3 (ITT), Emma Langley

Clasica Femenina Navarra, Veronica Ewers
2023
1st Paris–Roubaix Femmes, Alison Jackson

== National and world champions ==
2008
USA Road Race, Brooke Miller
2009
USA Road Race, Meredith Miller
2010
Australia Road Race, Ruth Corset
2011
World Track (Omnium), Tara Whitten
Canada Track (Omnium), Tara Whitten
2012
USA Road Race, Megan Guarnier
USA Track (Pursuit), Lauren Hall
2015
USA Criterium, Kendall Ryan
2017
Mexican Road Race, Íngrid Drexel
Mexican Time Trial, Íngrid Drexel
Guatemala Time Trial, Nicolle Bruderer
Guatemala Road Race, Nicolle Bruderer
2018
Australia Road Race, Shannon Malseed
Guatemala Time Trial, Nicolle Bruderer
Mexican Time Trial, Íngrid Drexel
Oceania Road Race, Sharlotte Lucas
2019
Oceania Road Race, Sharlotte Lucas
2020
Australia Time Trial, Sarah Gigante
2021
Australia Time Trial, Sarah Gigante
USA Road Race, Lauren Stephens
USA Cyclo-cross, Clara Honsinger
2022
Israel Time Trial, Omer Shapira
Israel Road Race, Omer Shapira
USA Road Race, Emma Langley

2023
Canada Road Race, Alison Jackson
