= White Spot / Delta Road Race (women's race) =

Race details
- Date: July
- Region: Delta, British Columbia
- Discipline: Road
- Web site: tourdedelta.ca

History
- First edition: 2011
- Editions: 9
- First winner: Jasmin Glaesser (CAN)
- Most wins: Leah Kirchmann (CAN) (2 wins)
- Most recent: Kendall Ryan (USA)

The White Spot / Delta Road Race was an elite women's professional one-day road bicycle race held in Canada up until 2019, and was rated by the UCI as a 1.2 race.

== Past winners ==
Year	Country	Rider	Team
2011	Canada	Jasmin Glaesser	Local Ride Racing / Dr. Vie Superfoods+
2012	Canada	Morgan Cabot	Glotman Simpson Cycling
2013	Canada	Leah Kirchmann	Optum–Kelly Benefit Strategies
2014	Canada	Leah Kirchmann	Optum–Kelly Benefit Strategies
2015	United States	Shelley Olds	Bigla Pro Cycling Team
2016	Canada	Joëlle Numainville	Cervélo–Bigla Pro Cycling
2017	United States	Kendall Ryan	Tibco–Silicon Valley Bank
