= Tour Cycliste Féminin International de l'Ardèche =

French women's cycling race

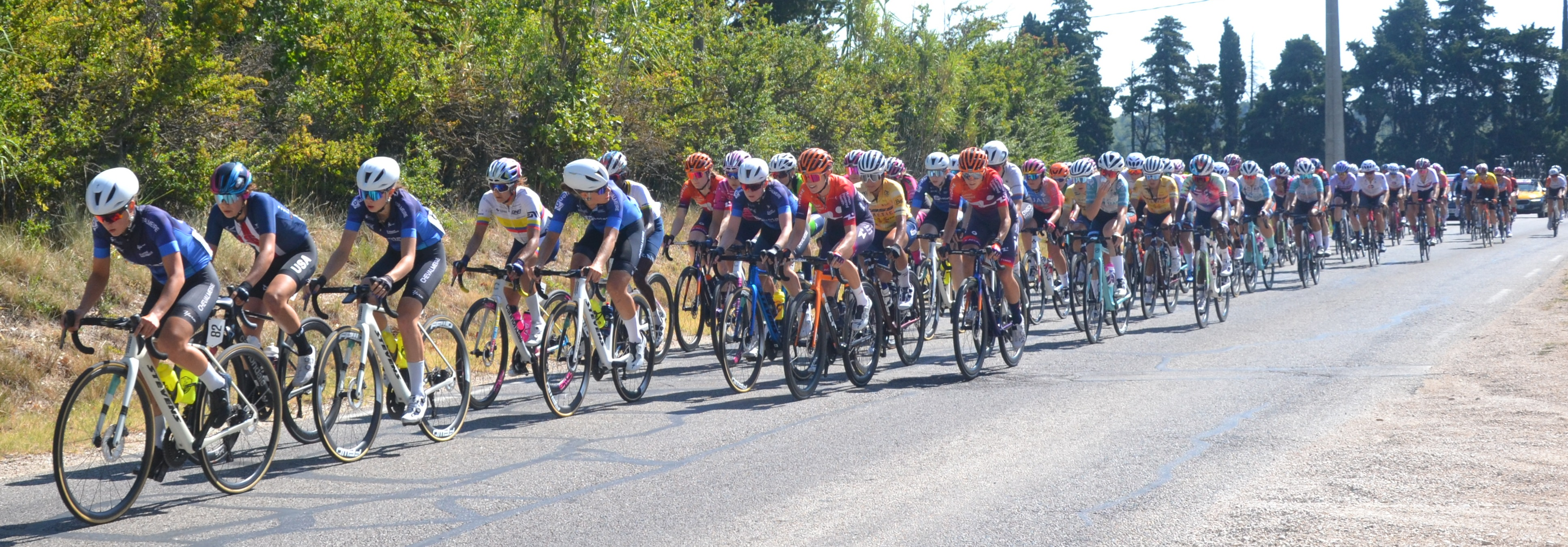

Race details
- Date: September
- Region: France
- Local name(s): Tour de l'Ardèche
- Type: Stage race
- Organiser: Vélo Club Vallée du Rhône Ardéchoise
- Race director: Louis Jeannin
- Web site: tcfia.com

History
- First edition: 2003
- Editions: 19 (as of 2021)
- First winner: Edita Pučinskaitė (LTU)
- Most wins: Edita Pučinskaitė (LTU) (3 wins)
- Most recent: Thalita de Jong (NED)

Tour Cycliste Féminin International de l'Ardèche is a women's staged cycle race which takes place in the Ardèche region in southeastern France. The race was rated by the UCI as a 2.2 race, until 2018 when it was promoted to 2.1 status.

Following the removal of the Grande Boucle Féminine Internationale from the UCI calendar, the first edition of the Tour Cycliste Féminin International de l'Ardèche was staged in 2003.

Following the collapse of the Tour de l'Aude Cycliste Féminin and the Route de France Féminine races in 2010 and 2016 respectively, the Tour de l'Ardèche became the only international level multi day stage race for women in France. The race was joined by Tour de France Femmes in 2022.

== Previous winners ==
Year	Winner	Second	Third
2003	Edita Pučinskaitė (LTU)	Modesta Vžesniauskaitė (LTU)	Sigrid Corneo (SLO)
2004	Elisabeth Chevanne Brunel (FRA)	Béatrice Thomas (FRA)	Uenia Fernandes Sousa (BRA)
2005	Edita Pučinskaitė (LTU)	Kristin Armstrong (USA)	Daiva Tušlaitė (LTU)
2006	Edita Pučinskaitė (LTU)	Tatiana Guderzo (ITA)	Uenia Fernandes Sousa (BRA)
2007	Maria Moreno (ESP)	Fabiana Luperini (ITA)	Kathryn Curi Mattis (USA)
2008	Amber Neben (USA)	Emma Pooley (GBR)	Susanne Ljungskog (SWE)
2009	Kristin Armstrong (USA)	Grace Verbeke (BEL)	Lizzie Armitstead (GBR)
2010	Vicki Whitelaw (AUS)	Sharon Laws (GBR)	Ruth Corset (AUS)
2011	Emma Pooley (GBR)	Ashleigh Moolman (RSA)	Christelle Ferrier-Bruneau (FRA)
2012	Emma Pooley (GBR)	Ashleigh Moolman (RSA)	Tayler Wiles (USA)
2013	Tatiana Antoshina (RUS)	Ashleigh Moolman (RSA)	Karol-Ann Canuel (CAN)
2014	Linda Villumsen (DEN)	Tayler Wiles (USA)	Rossella Ratto (ITA)
2015	Tayler Wiles (USA)	Lauren Stephens (USA)	Rossella Ratto (ITA)
2016	Flávia Oliveira (BRA)	Anna Kiesenhofer (AUT)	Edwige Pitel (FRA)
2017	Lucy Kennedy (AUS)	Hanna Nilsson (SWE)	Leah Thomas (USA)
2018	Katarzyna Niewiadoma (POL)	Mavi García (ESP)	Eider Merino (ESP)
2019	Marianne Vos (NED)	Clara Koppenburg (GER)	Eider Merino (ESP)
2020	Lauren Stephens (USA)	Mavi García (ESP)	Anna Kiesenhofer (AUT)
2021	Leah Thomas (USA)	Mavi García (ESP)	Ane Santesteban (ESP)
2022	Antonia Niedermaier (GER)	Loes Adegeest (NED)	Paula Patiño (COL)
2023	Marta Cavalli (ITA)	Erica Magnaldi (ITA)	Anastasiya Kolesava (BLR)
2024	Thalita de Jong (NED)	Marion Bunel (FRA)	Monica Trinca Colonel (ITA)

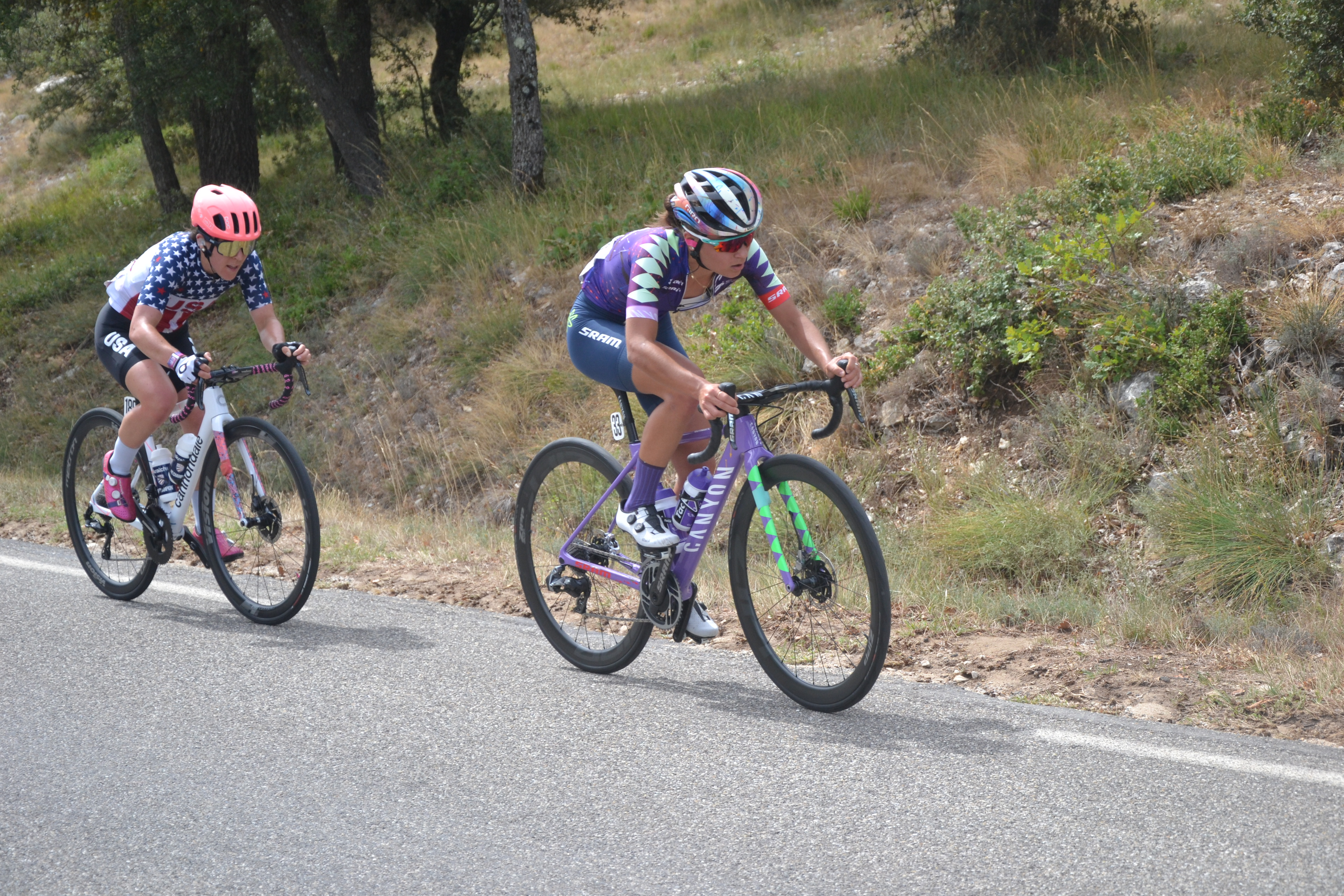
Emma Langley and Ricarda Bauernfeind in 2022.

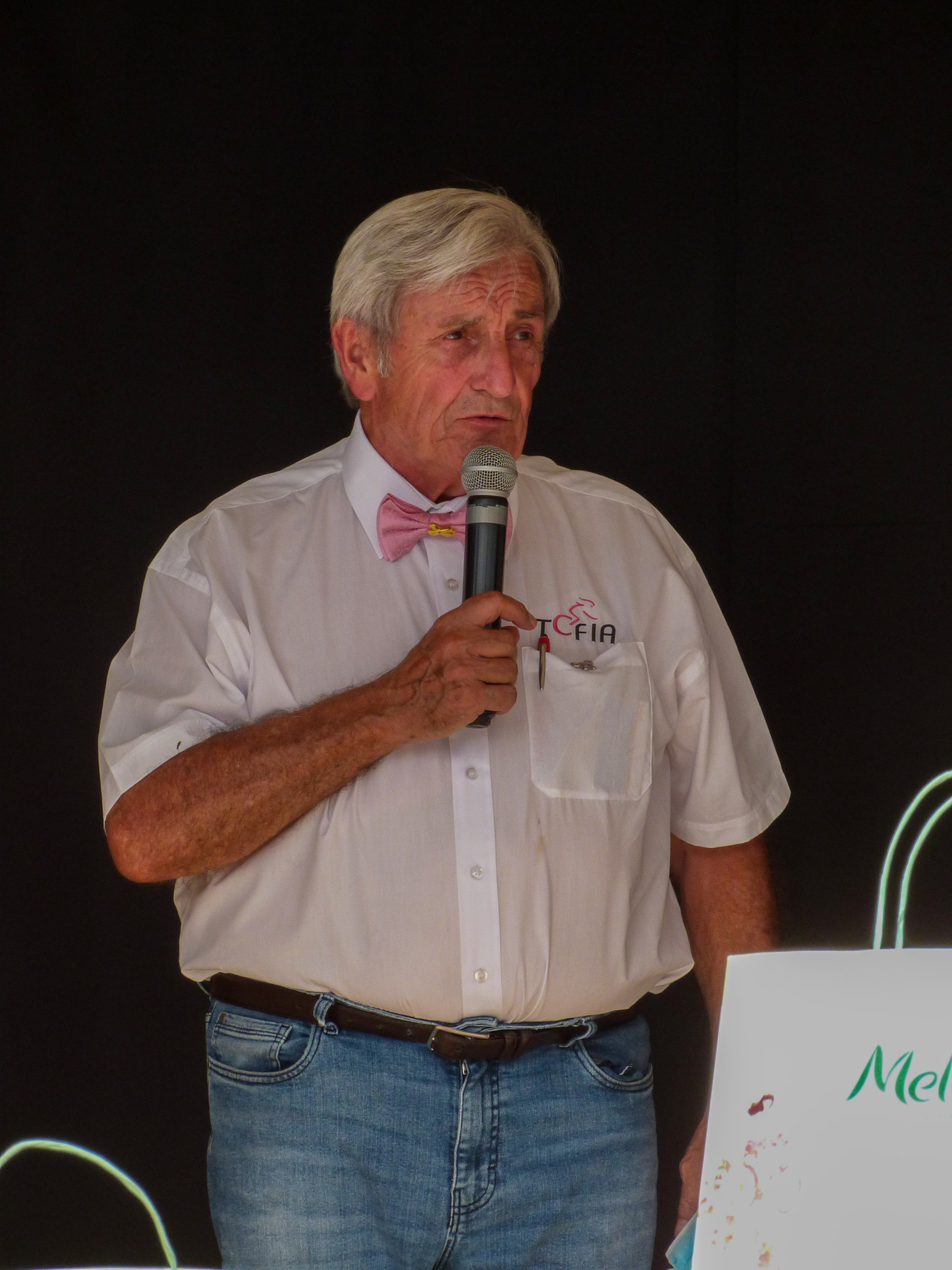
Louis Jeannin, race director in 2023.

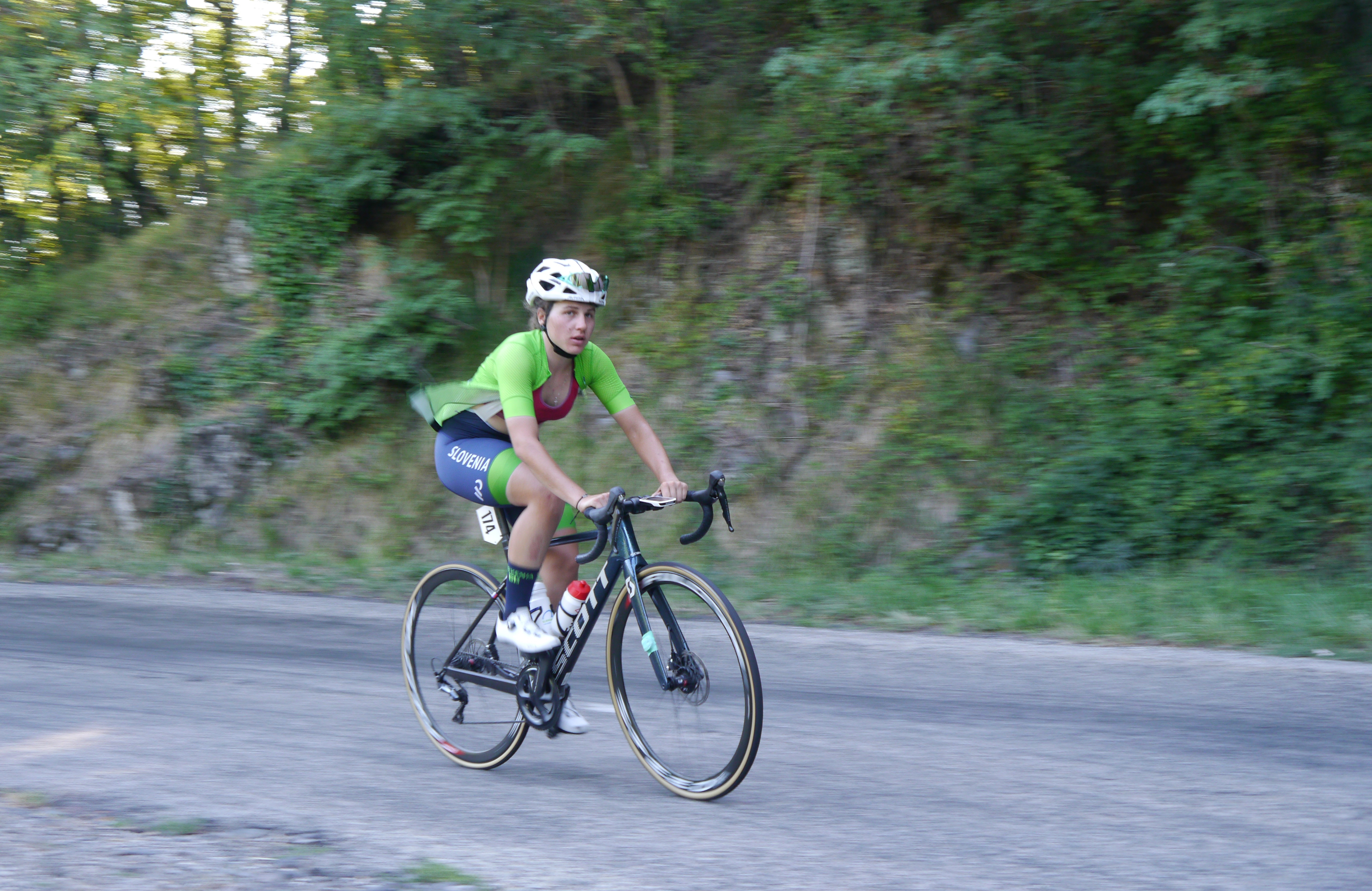
Nika Bobnar in TCFIA 2022.

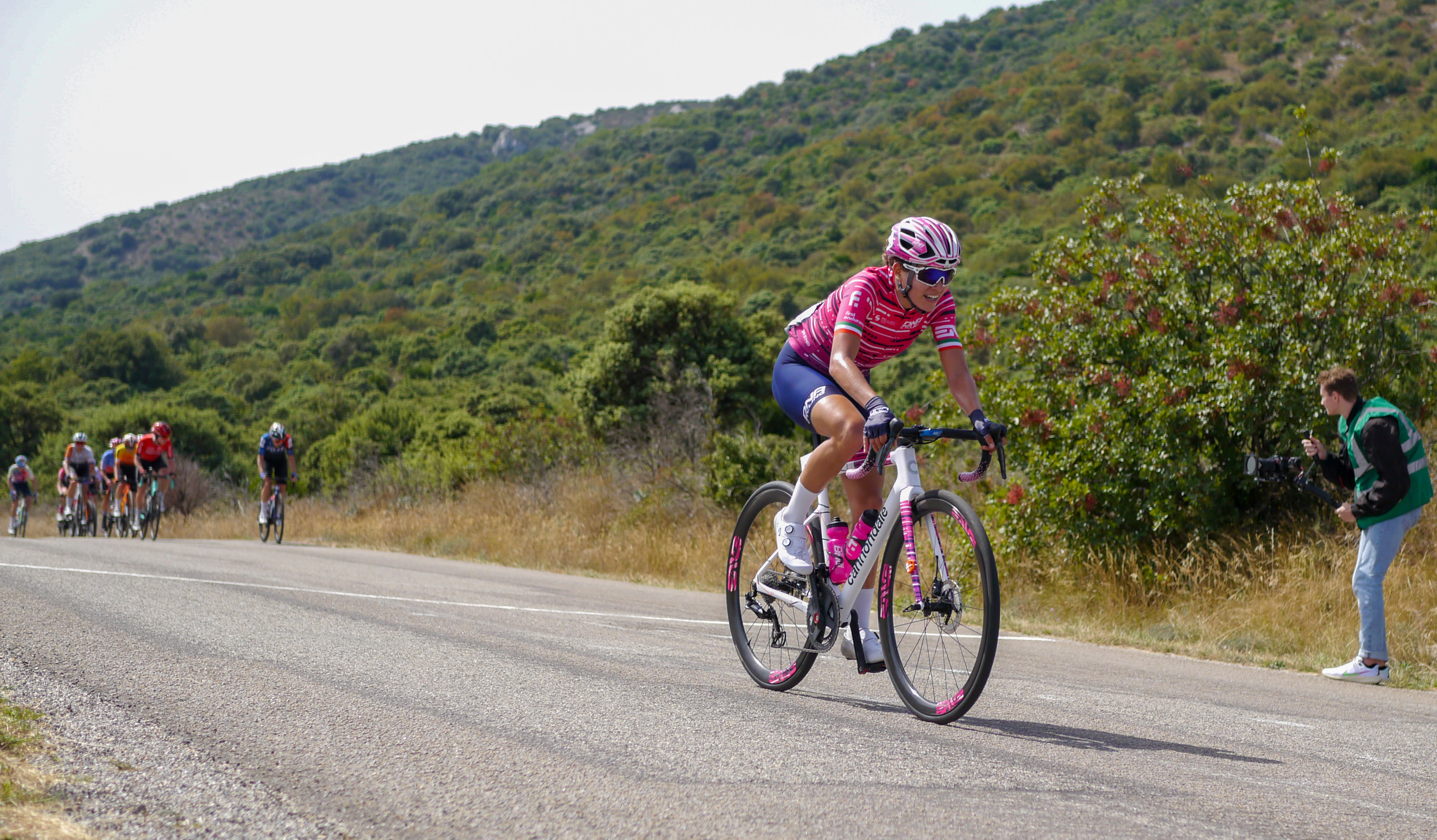
Anet Barrera in 2023.
