= Australian National Mountain Bike Championships =

National mountain bike championship in Australia

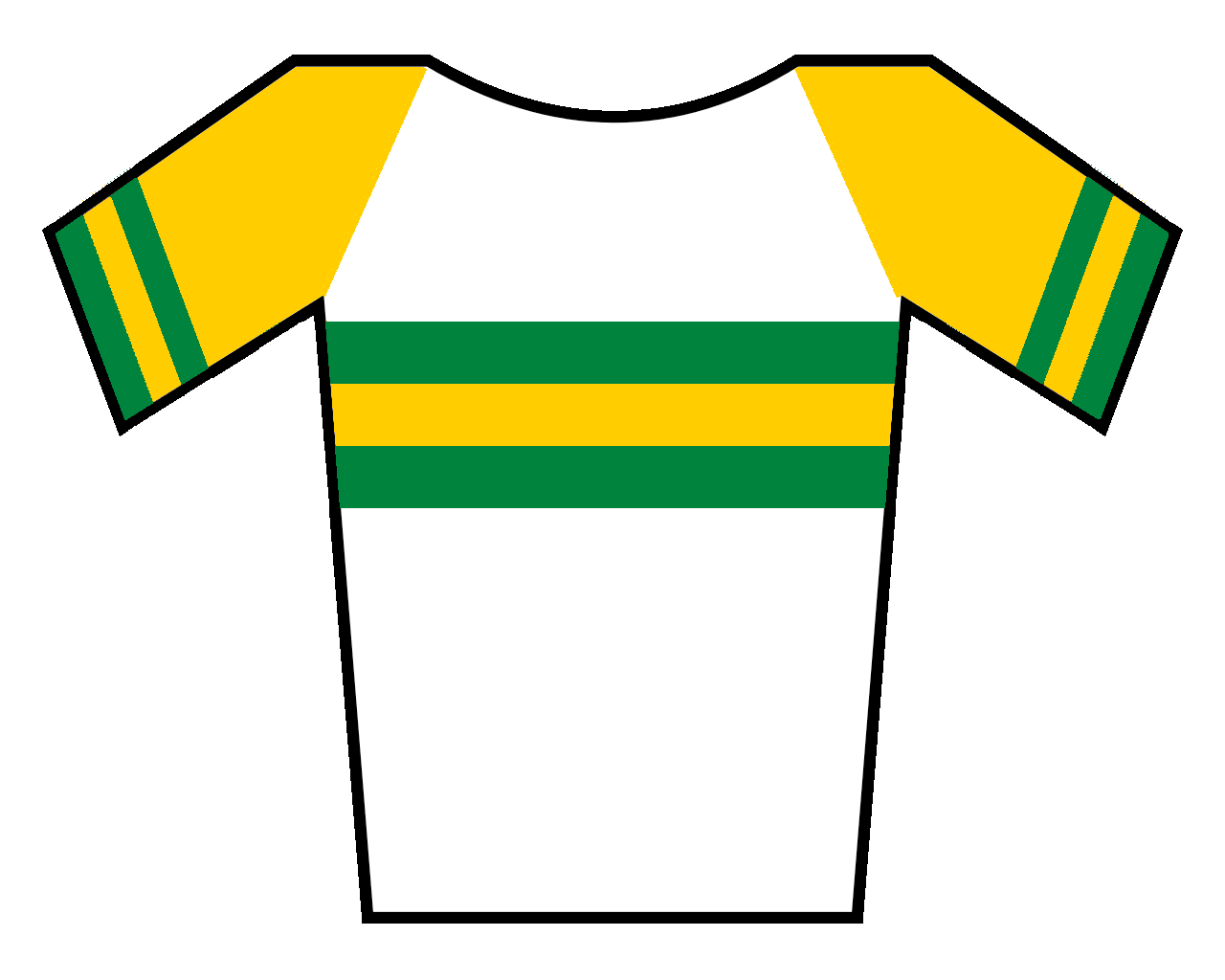
- The champion's jersey

Race details
- Region: Australia
- Discipline: Mountain biking
- Type: National championship
- Organiser: AusCycling

History
- First edition: 1984

The Australian National Mountain Bike Championships are held annually to decide the cycling champions in the mountain biking discipline, across various categories.

== Cross-country (XCO) ==
=== Elite ===
==== Women ====
Year	Winner	Second	Third	Location
2010	Rowena Fry	Heather Logie	Jenni King	Adelaide, SA
2011	Katherine O'shea	Heather Logie	Jenni King	Adelaide, SA
2012	Jenni King	Rowena Fry	Jodie Willett	Adelaide, SA
2013	Peta Mullens	Jenni King	Rowena Fry	Canberra, ACT
2014	Rebecca Henderson	Peta Mullens	Jenni King	Bright, VIC
2015	Rebecca Henderson	Peta Mullens	Jenni King	Bright, VIC
2016	Rebecca Henderson	Peta Mullens	Jenni King	Bright, VIC
2017	Rebecca Henderson	Holly Harris	Kathryn Mcinerney	Canungra, QLD
2018	Rebecca Henderson	Holly Harris	Eliza Smyth	Armidale, NSW
2019	Rebecca Henderson	Holly Harris	Kathryn Mcinerney	Bright, VIC
2020	Rebecca Henderson	Peta Mullens	Kathryn Mcinerney	Bright, VIC
2021	Rebecca Henderson	Zoe Cuthbert	Karen Hill	Maydena, TAS
2022	Rebecca Henderson	Zoe Cuthbert	Holly Harris	Maydena, TAS
2023	Rebecca Henderson	Zoe Cuthbert	Peta Mullens	Thredbo, NSW
2024	Rebecca Henderson	Zoe Cuthbert	Katherine Hosking	Newcastle, NSW
2025	Rebecca Henderson	Izzy Flint	Zoe Cuthbert	Mt Buller, VIC

==== Men ====
Year	Winner	Second	Third	Location
2010	Daniel Mcconnell	Lachlan Norris	Joshua Carlson	Adelaide, SA
2011	Chris Jongewaard	Lachlan Norris	Lefmann Aiden	Adelaide, SA
2012	Daniel Mcconnell	Paul Van Der Ploeg	Andrew Blair	Adelaide, SA
2013	Chris Jongewaard	Daniel Mcconnell	Sid Taberlay	Canberra, ACT
2014	Daniel Mcconnell	Jared Graves	Mark Tupalski	Bright, VIC
2015	Daniel Mcconnell	Brendan Johnston	Paul Van Der Ploeg	Bright, VIC
2016	Daniel Mcconnell	Cameron Ivory	Kyle Ward	Bright, VIC
2017	Daniel Mcconnell	Cameron Ivory	Mark Tupalski	Canungra, QLD
2018	Cameron Ivory	Daniel Mcconnell	Jayne Sebastian	Armidale, NSW
2019	Daniel Mcconnell	Cameron Ivory	Reece Tucknott	Bright, VIC
2020	Daniel Mcconnell	Cameron Ivory	Reece Tucknott	Bright, VIC
2021	Daniel Mcconnell	Jared Graves	Cameron Ivory	Maydena, TAS
2022	Matthew Dinham	Daniel Mcconnell	Cameron Ivory	Maydena, TAS
2023	Sam Fox	Daniel Mcconnell	Cameron Ivory	Thredbo, NSW
2024	Cameron Ivory	Jack Ward	Daniel Mcconnell	Newcastle, NSW
2025	Sam Fox	Jack Ward	Reece Tucknott	Mt Buller, VIC

=== Under 23 ===
==== Women ====
Year	Winner	Second	Third	Location
2010	Rebecca Henderson	Sarah Holmes	Therese Rhodes	Adelaide, SA
2011	Rebecca Henderson	Shelly Flood	-	Adelaide, SA
2012	Rebecca Henderson	Amy Austin	Shelly Flood	Adelaide, SA
2013	Rebecca Henderson	Clea O'brien	Rosemary Stewart	Canberra, ACT
2014	Holly Harris	Emily Parkes	-	Bright, VIC
2015	Emily Parkes	Holly Harris	-	Bright, VIC
2016	Holly Harris	Emily Parkes	Chantal Eheim	Bright, VIC
2017	Megan Williams	Charlotte Culver	-	Canungra, QLD
2018	Charlotte Culver	Sarah Tucknott	-	Armidale, NSW
2019	Katherine Hosking	Sarah Tucknott	Courtney SnowbalL	Bright, VIC
2020	Zoe Cuthbert	Katherine Hosking	Emily Wooster	Bright, VIC
2021	Katherine Hosking	Isabella Flint	Holly Lubcke	Maydena, TAS
2022	Katherine Hosking	Holly Lubcke	Izzy Flint	Maydena, TAS
2023	Izzy Flint	Oakes Hayley	Lillee Pollock	Thredbo, NSW
2024	Izzy Flint	Lillee Pollock	Anook Simpson	Newcastle, NSW
2025	Ella Menigoz	Ruby Dobson	Anook Simpson	Mt Buller, VIC

==== Men ====
Year	Winner	Second	Third	Location
2010	Paul Van Der Ploeg	Cal Britten	Daniel Braunsteins	Adelaide, SA
2011	Paul Van Der Ploeg	Luke Fetch	Trenton Day	Adelaide, SA
2012	Robbie Hucker	Jack Haig	Trenton Day	Adelaide, SA
2013	Jack Haig	Benjamin Forbes	Cameron Ivory	Canberra, ACT
2014	Cameron Ivory	Jack Haig	Michael Crosbie	Bright, VIC
2015	Scott Bowden	Christopher Hamilton	Jayne Sebastian	Bright, VIC
2016	Scott Bowden	Tasman Nankervis	Christopher Hamilton	Bright, VIC
2017	Tasman Nankervis	Reece Tucknott	Ben Bradley	Canungra, QLD
2018	Alex Lack	Michael Harris	Reece Tucknott	Armidale, NSW
2019	Matthew Dinham	Cameron Wright	Alex Lack	Bright, VIC
2020	Cameron Wright	Sam Fox	Matthew Dinham	Bright, VIC
2021	Sam Fox	Matthew Dinham	Domenic Paolilli	Maydena, TAS
2022	Cameron Wright	Domenic Paolilli	Tom Cheesman	Maydena, TAS
2023	Domenic Paolilli	Isaac Fletcher	Joel Dodds	Thredbo, NSW
2024	Joel Dodds	Daniel Aurik	Patrick Flood	Newcastle, NSW
2025	Harry Doye	Sam Northey	Reuben Page-Brown	Mt Buller, VIC

=== Junior ===
==== Women ====
Year	Winner	Second	Third	Location
2010	Amy Austin	Sarah Holmes	Therese Rhodes	Adelaide, SA
2011	Amy Austin	Jess Wigan	Rosemary Stewart	Adelaide, SA
2012	Holly Harris	Kyna Millan	Emily Parkes	Adelaide, SA
2013	Holly Harris	Emily Parkes	Gibson Karlee	Canberra, ACT
2014	Megan Williams	Elle Wale		Bright, VIC
2015	Megan Williams	Ebony Tanzen	Sara Mills	Bright, VIC
2016	Sarah I'ons	Ruby Wilson	Mikayla Wolfe	Bright, VIC
2017	Katherine Hosking	Teagan Atherstone	Sarah Tucknott	Canungra, QLD
2018	Zoe Cuthbert	Teagan Atherstone	Courtney Snowball	Armidale, NSW
2019	Zoe Cuthbert	Holly Lubcke	Phoebe Thompson	Bright, VIC
2020	Isabella Flint	Holly Lubcke	Isabella Hosking	Bright, VIC
2021	Oakes Hayley	Lillee Pollock	Zoe Davison	Maydena, TAS
2022	Ruby Dobson	Jessica Williams	Millie Chester	Maydena, TAS
2023	Amelie Burrell	Ruby Taylor	Caitlyn Brazier	Thredbo, NSW
2024	Amelie Burrell	Ruby Taylor	Alana Fletcher	Newcastle, NSW
2025	Amelie Burrell	Ruby Taylor	Alana Fletcher	Mt Buller, VIC

==== Men ====
Year	Winner	Second	Third	Location
2010	Mitchell Codner	Cameron Ivory	Kyle Ward	Adelaide, SA
2011	Ryan Standish	Billy Sewell	Christopher Aitken	Adelaide, SA
2012	Ben Bradley	Billy Sewell	Benjamin Forbes	Adelaide, SA
2013	Ben Bradley	Jack Lavis	Felix Smalley	Canberra, ACT
2014	Reece Tucknott	Mitchell Greenway	Felix Smalley	Bright, VIC
2015	Liam Jeffries	Dunkin Bryan	Luke Brame	Bright, VIC
2016	Michael Harris	Kian Lerch-Mackinnon	Luke Pankhurst	Bright, VIC
2017	Cameron Wright	Kian Lerch-Mackinnon	Sam Fox	Canungra, QLD
2018	Cameron Wright	Matthew Dinham	Sam Fox	Armidale, NSW
2019	Smith Corey	Chisholm Nick	Liam Johnston	Bright, VIC
2020	Domenic Paolilli	Martin Brayden	Liam Johnston	Bright, VIC
2021	Joel Dodds	Isaac Fletcher	Riley Corke	Maydena, TAS
2022	Joel Dodds	Jack Ward	Cohen Jessen	Maydena, TAS
2023	Jack Ward	Cohen Jessen	Harry Doye	Thredbo, NSW
2024	Harry Doye	Vinnie Manion	Eddie Mungoven	Newcastle, NSW
2025	Connor Wright	Liam Roberts Thompson	Eddie Mungoven	Mt Buller, VIC

== Downhill (DHI) ==
=== Women ===
Year	Winner	Second	Third	Location
2010	Claire Whiteman	Leonie Picton	Emily Hockey	Adelaide, SA
2011	Leonie Picton	Claire Buchar	Julia Boer	Adelaide, SA
2012	Tracey Hannah	Jill Kintner	Danielle Beecroft	Adelaide, SA
2013	Tracey Hannah	Caroline Buchanan	Lisa Mathison	Canberra, ACT
2014	Tracey Hannah	Emma Mcnaughton	Shelly Flood	Bright, VIC
2015	Tracey Hannah	Claire Buchar	Tegan Molloy	Bright, VIC
2016	Tracey Hannah	Lisa Mathison	Sian A'hern	Bright, VIC
2017	Ronja Hill-Wright	Sian A'hern	Kaitlin Lawlor	Beaudesert, QLD
2018	Tracey Hannah	Tegan Molloy	Sian A'hern	Bright, VIC
2019	Tracey Hannah	Sian A'hern	Tegan Molloy	Bright, VIC
2020	Sian A'hern	Tegan Molloy	Cassie Voysey	Bright, VIC
2021	Sian A'hern	Elise Empey	Lia Ladbrook	Maydena, TAS
2022	Ellie Smith	Sian A'hern	Harriet Burbidge-Smith	Maydena, TAS
2023	Sian A'hern	Nina Hoffmann	Anna Newkirk	Thredbo, NSW
2024	Ellie Smith	Elleni Turkovic	Elise Empey	Newcastle, NSW
2025	Sian A'hern	Sacha Mills	Zali Miklas	Mt Buller, VIC

=== Men ===
Year	Winner	Second	Third	Location
2010	Chris Kovarik	Shaun O'connor	Joshua Button	Adelaide, SA
2011	Michael Hannah	Connor Fearon	Joshua Button	Adelaide, SA
2012	Troy Brosnan	Samuel Hill	Rhys Willemse	Adelaide, SA
2013	Michael Hannah	Jared Graves	Samuel Hill	Canberra, ACT
2014	Troy Brosnan	Connor Fearon	Jack Moir	Bright, VIC
2015	Troy Brosnan	Connor Fearon	Dean Lucas	Bright, VIC
2016	Troy Brosnan	Connor Fearon	Joshua Button	Bright, VIC
2017	Jack Moir	Connor Fearon	Troy Brosnan	Beaudesert, QLD
2018	Troy Brosnan	Jack Moir	Jackson Frew	Bright, VIC
2019	Troy Brosnan	Dean Lucas	Connor Fearon	Bright, VIC
2020	Troy Brosnan	Connor Fearon	Aaron Gungl	Bright, VIC
2021	Troy Brosnan	Daniel Booker	Dean Lucas	Maydena, TAS
2022	Connor Fearon	Jackson Frew	Baxter Maiwald	Maydena, TAS
2023	Jackson Goldstone	Luke Meier-Smith	Troy Brosnan	Thredbo, NSW
2024	Luke Meier-Smith	Jack Moir	Troy Brosnan	Newcastle, NSW
2025	Luke Meier-Smith	Troy Brosnan	Kye A’Hern	Mt Buller, VIC

== Cross-country Short Circuit (XCC) ==
=== Women ===
Year	Winner	Second	Third	Location
2016	Rebecca Henderson	Emily Parkes	Holly Harris	Bright, VIC
2017	Caitlin Dore	-	-	Canungra, QLD
2019	Kathryn Mcinerney	Charlotte Culver	Cristy Henderson	Bright, VIC
2020	Rebecca Henderson	Peta Mullens	Kathryn Mcinerney	Bright, VIC
2021	Rebecca Henderson	Zoe Cuthbert	Katherine Hosking	Maydena, TAS
2022	Rebecca Henderson	Zoe Cuthbert	Alice Patterson-Robert	Maydena, TAS
2023	Rebecca Henderson	Zoe Cuthbert	Katherine Hosking	Thredbo, NSW
2024	Zoe Cuthbert	Anook Simpson	Mercede Cornelius-Feltus	Newcastle, NSW
2025	Rebecca Henderson	Izzy Flint	Zoe Cuthbert	Mt Buller, VIC

=== Men ===
Year	Winner	Second	Third	Location
2016	Daniel Mcconnell	Brendan Johnston	Cameron Ivory	Bright, VIC
2017	Jack Lamshed	Boaz Clark	Benjamin Gooley	Canungra, QLD
2019	Cameron Ivory	Reece Tucknott	Russell Nankervis	Bright, VIC
2020	Cameron Ivory	Tristan Ward	Sebastian Jayne	Bright, VIC
2021	Daniel Mcconnell	Sam Fox	Cameron Wright	Maydena, TAS
2022	Jared Graves	Matthew Dinham	Sam Fox	Maydena, TAS
2023	Sam Fox	Cameron Ivory	Brendan Johnston	Thredbo, NSW
2024	Daniel Mcconnell	Scott Bowden	Jared Graves	Newcastle, NSW
2025	Jack Ward	Scott Bowden	Tasman Nankervis	Mt Buller, VIC

== Cross-country Marathon (XCM) ==
=== Women ===
Year	Winner	Second	Third	Location
2010	Heather Logie	Jodie Willett	Tory Thomas	Avoca, VIC
2011	-	-	-	
2012	Peta Mullens	Jodie Willett	Jenny Blair	Canberra, ACT
2013	-	-	-	
2014	Melissa Anset	Therese Rhodes	Imogen Smith	Mt Joyce, QLD
2015	Jenny Blair	Eliza Smyth	Rebecca Locke	Derby, TAS
2016	Peta Mullens	Jenni King	Mattocks Briony	Derby, TAS
2017	Rebecca Henderson	Holly Harris	Emma Viotto	Townsville, QLD
2018	-	-	-	
2019	Holly Harris	Cristy Henderson	Emma Viotto	Redland Bay, QLD
2020	-	-	-	
2021	-	-	-	
2022	Emma Viotto	Karen Hill	Peta Mullens	Wagga Wagga, NSW
2023	Peta Mullens	Katherine Hosking	Elizabeth Nuspan	Wagga Wagga, NSW
2024	Courtney Sherwell	Izzy Flint	Ella Bloor	Wagga Wagga, NSW

=== Men ===
Year	Winner	Second	Third	Location
2010	Ben Mather	Peter Hatton	Craig Gordon	Avoca, VIC
2011	-	-	-	
2012	Andrew Blair	Trenton Day	Peter Hatton	Canberra, ACT
2013	-	-	-	
2014	Andrew Blair	Shaun Lewis	Adrian Jackson	Mt Joyce, QLD
2015	Brendan Johnston	Mark Tupalski	Andrew Blair	Derby, TAS
2016	Brendan Johnston	Tasman Nankervis	Scott Bowden	Derby, TAS
2017	Brendan Johnston	Daniel Mcconnell	Ryan Standish	Townsville, QLD
2018	-	-	-	
2019	Brendan Johnston	Reece Tucknott	Alex Lack	Redland Bay, QLD
2020	-	-	-	
2021	-	-	-	
2022	Brendan Johnston	Tasman Nankervis	Adrian Jackson	Wagga Wagga, NSW
2023	Rees Brent	Tasman Nankervis	Brendan Johnston	Wagga Wagga, NSW
2024	Brendan Johnston	Scott Bowden	Daniel Mcconnell	Wagga Wagga, NSW

== Enduro (EDR) ==
=== Women ===
Year	Winner	Second	Third	Location
2015	Emily Parkes	Jaclyn Schapel	Williams Angela	Cairns, QLD
2016	Philippa Rostan	Shelly Flood	Emily Parkes	Eagle MTB Park, SA
2017	Rowena Fry	Philippa Rostan	Shelly Flood	Fox Creek, SA
2018	Rowena Fry	Shelly Flood	Emily Parkes	Fox Creek, SA
2019	Rowena Fry	Leanna Curtis	Shelly Flood	Maydena, TAS
2022	Jessica Hoskin	Zoe Cuthbert	Sian A'hern	Red Hill, VIC
2023	Jessica Hoskin	Rachel Hore	Peta Mullens	Red Hill, VIC
2024	Elle De Nooyer	Jessica Hoskin	Lacey Adams	Perth, WA

=== Men ===
Year	Winner	Second	Third	Location
2015	Christopher Panozzo	Berend Boer	Shannon Hewetson	Cairns, QLD
2016	Christopher Panozzo	Ben Cory	Jordan Prochyra	Eagle MTB Park, SA
2017	Troy Brosnan	Connor Fearon	Christopher Panozzo	Fox Creek, SA
2018	Connor Fearon	Andrew Cavaye	Benjamin Mcilroy	Fox Creek, SA
2019	Connor Fearon	Dan Booker	Troy Brosnan	Maydena, TAS
2022	Hayden Stead	Timothy Eaton	Sam Walsh	Red Hill, VIC
2023	Ryan Gilchrist	Timothy Eaton	Hayden Stead	Red Hill, VIC
2024	Luke Meier-Smith	Bailey Christie	Cooper Northey	Perth, WA

== Pump Track (PUM) ==
=== Women ===
Year	Winner	Second	Third	Location
2019	Danielle Beecroft	Harriet Burbidge-Smith	Ellie Smith	Bright, VIC
2020	Zoe Cuthbert	Harriet Burbridge	Ellie Smith	Bright, VIC
2022	Caroline Buchanan	Shannon Petre	Harriet Burbidge-Smith	Maydena, TAS
2023	-	-	-	Thredbo, NSW
2024	Elleni Turkovic	Connor Mielke	Zoe Cuthbert	Newcastle, NSW

=== Men ===
Year	Winner	Second	Third	Location
2019	Duke Millington	Luke Meier-Smith	Stephan Ficovic	Bright, VIC
2020	Luke Meier-Smith	Duke Millington	Ash Allnut	Bright, VIC
2022	Jayce Cunning	Oliver Moran	Ryan Gilchrist	Maydena, TAS
2023	-	-	-	Thredbo, NSW
2024	Ryan Gilchrist	Jayce Cunning	Billy Smidt	Newcastle, NSW

== Cross-country Eliminator (XCE) ==
=== Women ===
Year	Winner	Second	Third	Location
2013	Katherine O'shea	Rowena Fry	Lindsay Gorrell	Canberra, ACT
2014	Peta Mullens	Rowena Fry	Emily Parkes	Bright, VIC
2015	Emily Parkes	Rebecca Henderson	Peta Mullens	Bright, VIC
2016	-	-	-	
2017	-	-	-	
2018	Charlotte Culver	Zoe Cuthbert	Kathryn Mcinerney	Armidale, NSW

=== Men ===
Year	Winner	Second	Third	Location
2013	Paul Van Der Ploeg	Troy Herfoss	Daniel Mcconnell	Canberra, ACT
2014	Jared Graves	Daniel Mcconnell	Cameron Ivory	Bright, VIC
2015	Paul Van Der Ploeg	Tristan Ward	Cameron Ivory	Bright, VIC
2016	-	-	-	
2017	-	-	-	
2018	Cameron Ivory	Charlie Brodie	Matthew Dinham	Armidale, NSW

== Four Cross (4X) ==
=== Women ===
Year	Winner	Second	Third	Location
2010	Caroline Buchanan	Sarsha Huntington	Emily Hockey	Adelaide, SA
2011	Sarsha Huntington	Julia Boer	Jayne Rutter	Adelaide, SA
2012	-	-	-	Adelaide, SA

=== Men ===
Year	Winner	Second	Third	Location
2010	Luke Madill	Randal Huntington	Graeme Mudd	Adelaide, SA
2011	Jared Graves	Joe Vejvoda	Richard Levinson	Adelaide, SA
2012	Graeme Mudd	Blake Nielsen	Richard Levinson	Adelaide, SA

== Electric ==
=== E-Bike Cross-country (E-XC) ===
==== Women ====
Year	Winner	Second	Third	Location
2020	Beverley Anderson	-	-	Bright, VIC
2021	Rebecca Henderson	Isabella Hosking	Beverley Anderson	Maydena, TAS
2022	Jody Mielke	-	-	Maydena, TAS
2023	-	-	-	Thredbo, NSW
2024	Jessica Hoskin	Connor Mielke	Emma Stevenson	Newcastle, NSW
2025	Jessica Hoskin	Connor Mielke	-	Mt Buller, VIC

==== Men ====
Year	Winner	Second	Third	Location
2020	Joshua Carlson	Shannon Johnson	Paul Van Der Ploeg	Bright, VIC
2021	Joshua Carlson	Rohin Adams	Danny Taugge	Maydena, TAS
2022	Joshua Carlson	Caleb Dodds	Glen Goggin	Maydena, TAS
2023	-	-	-	Thredbo, NSW
2024	Jon Odams	Shannon Johnson	Thiago Boaretto	Newcastle, NSW
2025	Shannon Johnson	Martin Broman	Scott Farrar	Mt Buller, VIC

== Enduro Electric (EDR-E) ==
=== Women ===
Year	Winner	Second	Third	Location
2019	-	-	-	Maydena, TAS
2023	Caroline Buchanan	Kellie Catanese	-	Red Hill, VIC
2024	Ellie Smith	Waldron Jessica	Caroline Buchanan	Perth, WA

=== Men ===
Year	Winner	Second	Third	Location
2019	Joshua Carlson	Will Rischbieth	Benjamin Trinder	Maydena, TAS
2023	Thiago Boaretto	Tarenidis Noah	Daniel Griffin	Red Hill, VIC
2024	Jordan Prochyra	Michael Kennedy	Jacob Parker	Perth, WA

== See also ==
- Australian National Road Race Championships
- Australian National Time Trial Championships
- Australian National Criterium Championships
- National Road Cycling Championships
