= SIT Zero Fees Velodrome =

Sports venue in Invercargill

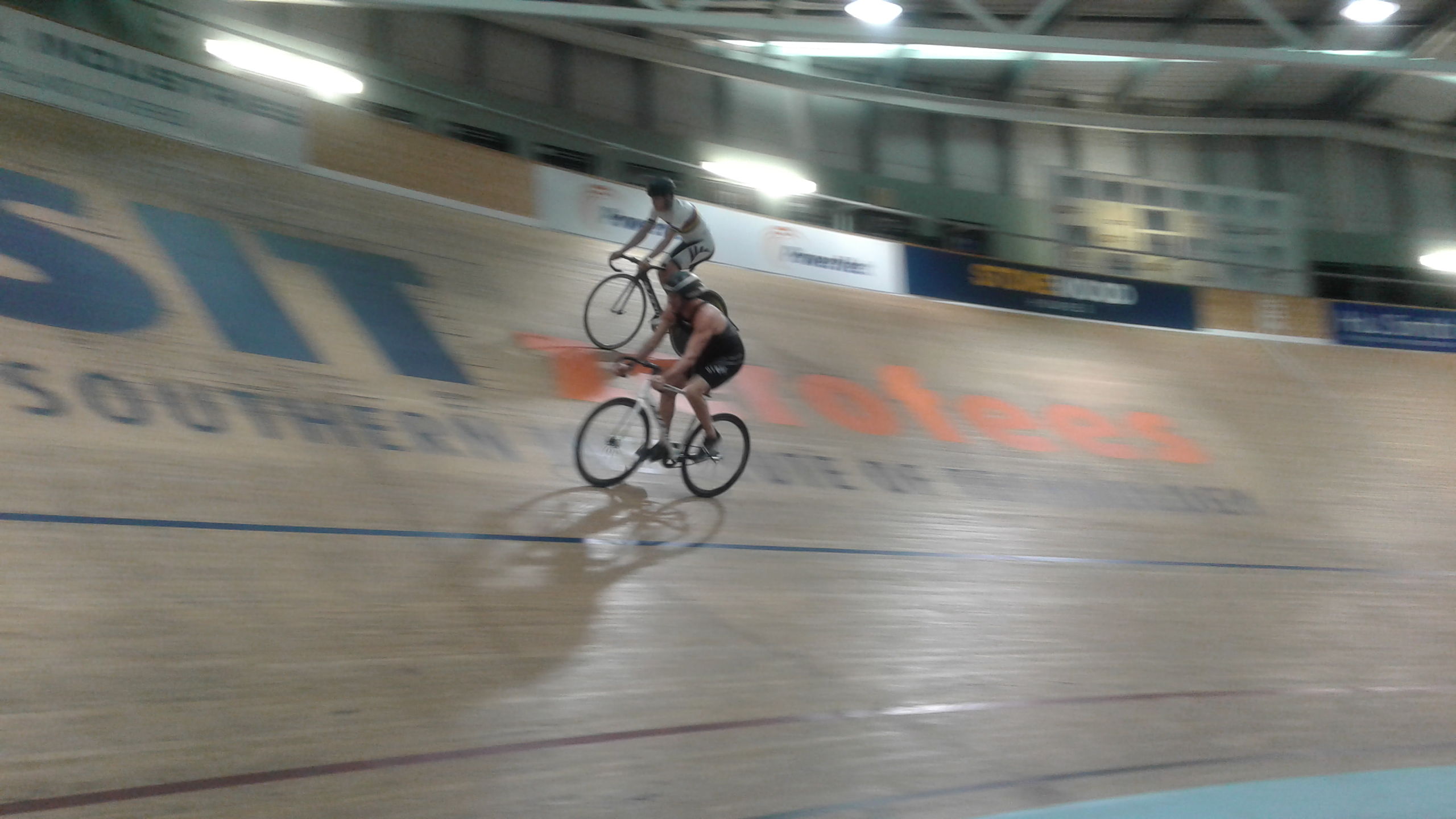
- September 2018: Corbin Strong and U.S. Ambassador, Scott Brown complete a circuit at SIT Zero Fees Velodrome
- Interactive map of SIT Zero Fees Velodrome
- Former names: Invercargill Velodrome; ILT Velodrome
- Location: Surrey Park Sports Centre; Glengarry; Invercargill; Southland
- Coordinates: 46°24′25″S 168°22′52″E
- Owner: Southland Indoor Leisure Centre Charitable Trust
- Capacity: Permanent seating: 1,064

Construction
- Opened: 26 May 2006

Tenants
- Cycling Southland; Cycling New Zealand; Southern Steel; Southland Sharks; Southland Stags

Website
- www.stadiumsouth.co.nz

The SIT Zero Fees Velodrome, previously known as the ILT Velodrome and also known as the Invercargill Velodrome, is an indoor velodrome located in Surrey Park, Invercargill, Southland, New Zealand. It is next door to the ILT Stadium Southland and is part of the same complex. It is the main home venue of Cycling Southland and it serves as a training facility for three Invercargill sporting franchises – Southland Stags, Southland Sharks and Southern Steel. The velodrome was originally opened in 2006. The venue is owned by Southland Indoor Leisure Centre Charitable Trust. Invercargill Licensing Trust previously held the naming rights. Since 2013, they have been held by the Southern Institute of Technology.

== Facilities ==
The SIT Zero Fees Velodrome features permanent seating for 1,064 with views available all around the fully carpeted concourse. In the middle of the cycling track is a pillar-less flat floor area of 2195 square metres comprising three full-size multi-sport courts with a Rebound Ace surface. Motorised nets surround the courts which allow for the track and courts to be utilised at the same time. There is a training facility in the centre of the velodrome where all three local sporting franchises, Southland Stags, Southern Steel and Southland Sharks are able to train.

== History ==
=== Construction ===
In 2003, a joint proposal from Cycling Southland and Stadium Southland was put together to develop a velodrome in Invercargill. Cycling enthusiasts, including Graham Sycamore, had long advocated for the establishment of a velodrome in New Zealand. Ray Harper subsequently chaired the Stadium Southland Extension Project. In 2005 construction began with German track designer, Ralph Schuermann, as the main designer, while Calder Stewart Industries were appointed as the project design and build company. The entire project was completed in 57 weeks, with 150 tonnes of track timber and equipment shipped from Germany to Dunedin via ship. The six containers were then transported by road to Invercargill from Dunedin. The project cost NZ$11 million to complete. On 26 May 2006, the velodrome was officially opened by Prime Minister Helen Clark. Sarah Ulmer subsequently became the first cyclist to officially ride the new velodrome.

=== Cycling ===
Between 2006 and 2014, the velodrome served as the home of Cycling New Zealand. However it was subsequently replaced by Cambridge's Avantidrome. The velodrome hosted the 2012 UCI Juniors Track World Championships. It has also hosted several Oceania Track Championships as well as Cycling Southland and Cycling New Zealand competitions.

The velodrome has helped develop several leading local cyclists, including Eddie Dawkins, Natasha Hansen, Tom Scully and Alison Shanks. Between 2018 and 2023, the velodrome served as home of the Southern Performance Hub, developing cyclists aged between 15 and 22.

=== Southern Steel ===
Three netball courts are situated inside the velodrome. During the 2011, 2012 and 2013 seasons, while Stadium Southland was unavailable following a roof collapse in September 2010, Southern Steel played their Invercargill home games at the velodrome.

=== Southland Sharks ===
Between 2011 and 2013, the velodrome also served as the temporary home venue for Southland Sharks of New Zealand's National Basketball League.

== Events hosted ==
Date	Event	
11–14 November 2009	2010 Oceania Track Championships	
6 October 2011	2011 Taini Jamison Trophy Series	International netball test between New Zealand and England
22–26 August 2012	2012 UCI Juniors Track World Championships	
21–24 November 2011	2012 Oceania Track Championships	
15 September 2013	2013 Constellation Cup	International netball test between New Zealand and Australia
19–22 November 2013	2014 Oceania Track Championships	
8–11 October 2015	2016 Oceania Track Championships	
16–19 October 2019	2020 Oceania Track Championships	

== Naming rights sponsor ==
	Years
Invercargill Licensing Trust	2006–2013
Southern Institute of Technology	2013–

== See also ==
- List of cycling tracks and velodromes

== Gallery ==
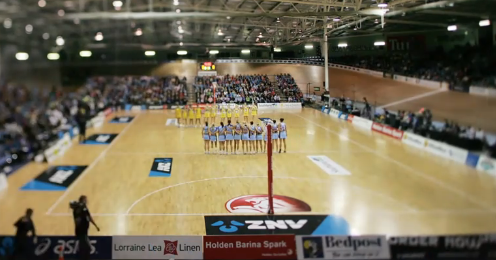
Between 2011 and 2013, the ILT Velodrome served as Southern Steel's temporary home.

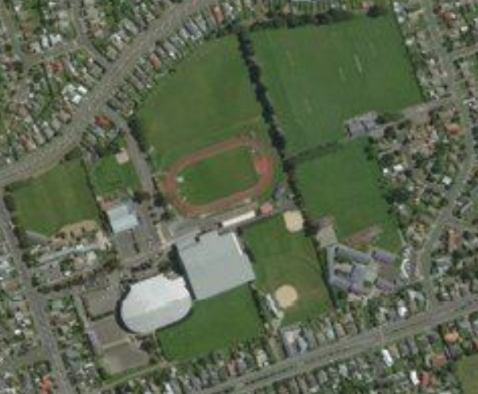
Satellite view of Surrey Park featuring the SIT Zero Fees Velodrome (right) and ILT Stadium Southland.

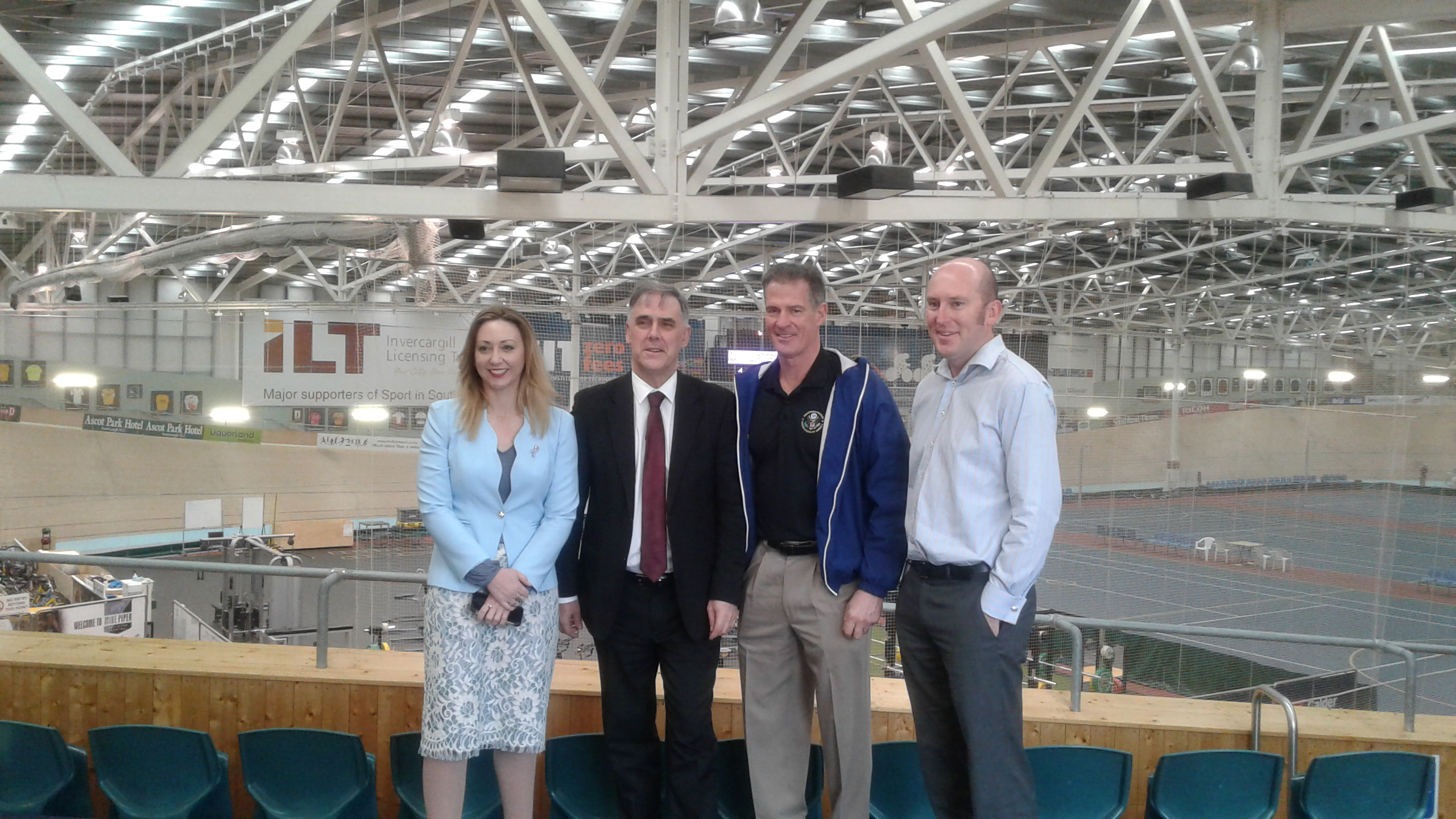
September 2018: U.S. Ambassador, Scott Brown (second from right) and Invercargill MP Sarah Dowie (left) visit the SIT Zero Fees Velodrome.
