= Kiwarrak Mountain Bike Park =

Mountain bike trail network in New South Wales, Australia

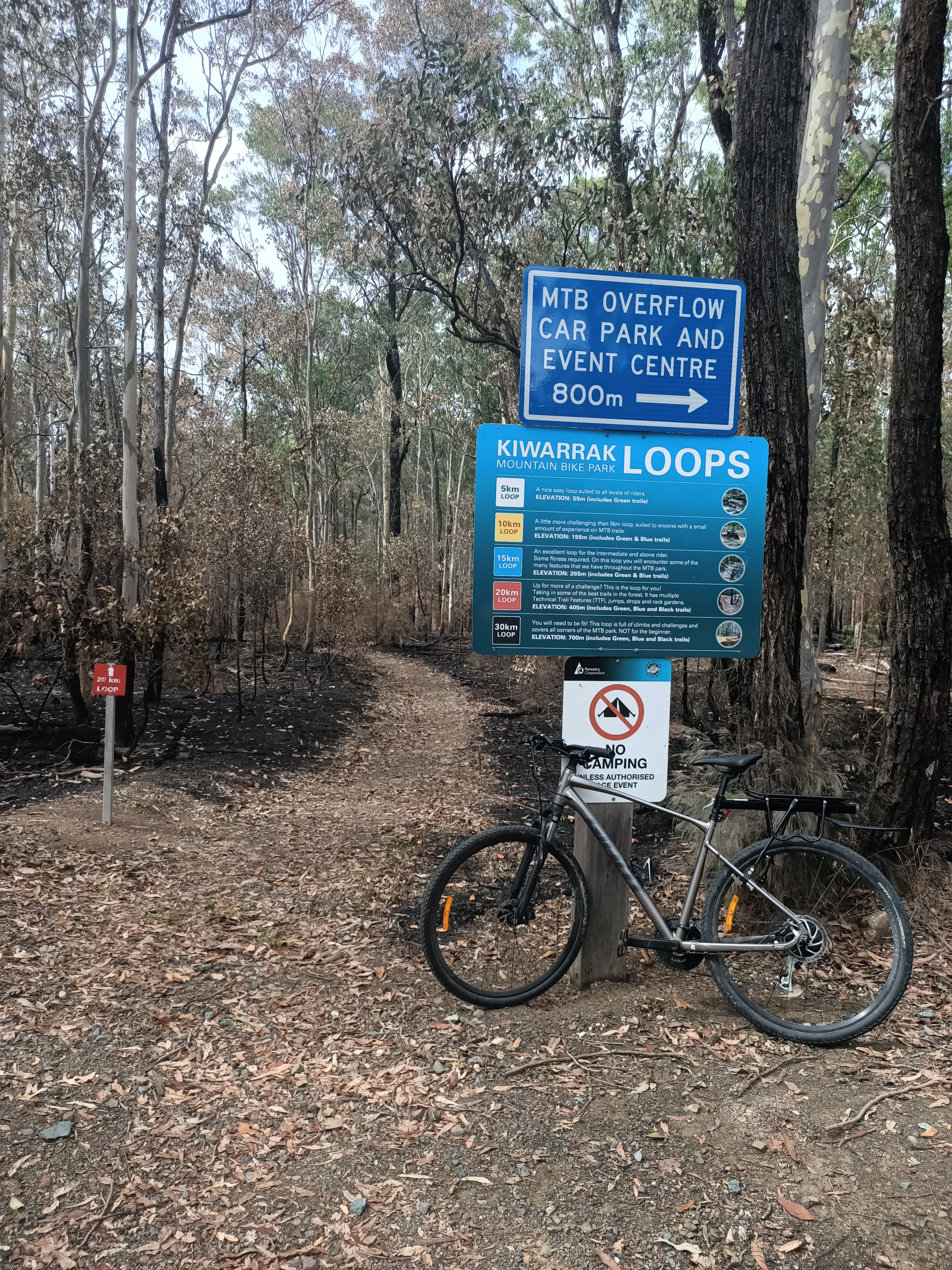
- Sign showing details of trail loops at Kiwarrak Mountain Bike Park
- Length: 80 km (50 mi)
- Location: Tinonee, New South Wales, Australia
- Established: Late 1990s
- Designation: State forest mountain bike park
- Trailheads: Main car park off Bucketts Way
- Use: Mountain biking
- Difficulty: Beginner, intermediate, and advanced
- Season: Year-round
- Website: https://www.tipriders.com/

Kiwarrak Mountain Bike Park (also known as the Kiwarrak Mountain Bike Trail) is a purpose-built mountain biking trail network located within Kiwarrak State Forest near Tinonee, New South Wales, Australia.

The park comprises approximately 80 kilometres of singletrack, ranging from beginner and adaptive trails to advanced gravity-fed trails. It is managed by the Manning–Great Lakes Tip Riders club in partnership with the Government of New South Wales and the Forestry Corporation of NSW, and is open year-round.

== History and development ==
Local volunteers began constructing the first trails in the late 1990s. The Manning–Great Lakes Tip Riders mountain bike club was formed in September 2010 to coordinate trail maintenance, future development, and organised club events.

The park has hosted regional and state-level competitive events, including rounds of the Mid North Coast XC Series and the Chocolate Foot Singletrack Mind Series during 2013–2014.

During the 2019–20 Australian bushfire season and the 2021 eastern Australia floods, much of the park’s wooden infrastructure—including bridges and jumps—was destroyed.

The park subsequently underwent a major redevelopment funded by the NSW Government, which contributed $403,980, supplemented by community fundraising and club sponsorships, bringing total project funding to $543,095.

The redevelopment expanded the trail network from approximately 40 kilometres in 2014 to around 80 kilometres, adding new bridges, jumps, gravity trails, community facilities, and a 2.7-kilometre adaptive trail. The park officially reopened on 6 June 2024.

== Facilities and infrastructure ==
Redevelopment works introduced new trail signage, an upgraded car park, climbing and downhill trails, toilet facilities, change rooms, and a covered barbecue area.

The park contains over 100 trail structures, including wall rides, jumps, and bridges built to international standards.

A 2.7-kilometre adaptive trail was constructed for wheelchair users and adaptive mountain bike riders and is among the longest of its type in Australia.

A wooden bridge crossing a gully along one of the park's trails.

A wooden seesaw obstacle on one of the park's trails.

== Community, events and tourism ==
The Manning–Great Lakes Tip Riders club organises volunteer trail-building events, community rides, and competitive races.

Major events hosted at the park include the Tippies MTB Trifecta and the PBM Hardrock 6 Hour cross-country race, which attracted over 140 competitors in 2023.

Regional media have reported that the park generates an estimated $2 million annually for the local economy and attracts hundreds of visitors per day.

== See also ==
- Mountain biking in Australia
- Forestry Corporation of NSW
- Mountain Bike Australia
