= Cycling Australia =

Former name of peak body for bicycle racing in Australia

- Sport: Cycling
- Jurisdiction: Australia
- Abbreviation: CA
- Affiliation: UCI
- Regional affiliation: OCC
- Headquarters: Melbourne, Victoria
- President: Steve Bracks
- CEO: Steven Drake
- Operating income: $16 million
- Closure date: 31 October 2020

Official website
- www.cycling.org.au
- (Australia)

Cycling Australia (CA), the trading name of the Australian Cycling Federation Inc, was the national governing body for bicycle racing in Australia, and represented the interests of affiliated cycling clubs and State federations. It covered the disciplines of road, track, mountain bike, cyclo-cross, and BMX.

In 2013, Cycling Australia had nearly 50,000 members including Mountain Bike Australia (MTBA) and BMX Australia (BMXA) members. In late November 2020, the three organisations rebranded as AusCycling.

Cycling Australia was a member of the Union Cycliste Internationale (UCI) and the Oceania Cycling Confederation (OCC). It was also recognised by the Australian Government, the Australian Olympic Committee, the Australian Commonwealth Games Association and the Australian Paralympic Committee.

== History ==
After World War II, the two organisations controlling cycling were the Australian Cycling Council and the Amateur Cyclists’ Association of Australia. In 1963, the UCI gave Australia "approximately 12 months to form one controlling body, to be recognised as the Australian Cycling Federation". It took more than 30 years for that to happen.

Under the direction of Charlie Walsh at the Australian Institute of Sport and national cycling coach from 1980 to 2001, Australia's international cycling performance ranking moved from between 20 and 30 in track cycling in the world, to the number one ranked nation in 1993 and 1994, and placed third at the 2000 Summer Olympics in Sydney.

The national coaching team of Shayne Bannan, Martin Barras, Ian McKenzie and Neil Stephens built on this foundation to take Australia to the leading nation in track cycling at the 2004 Summer Olympics in Athens.

In late 2011, federal Sports Minister Kate Lundy called for an investigation into Cycling Australia. A review by Justice James Wood produced a 95-page report which described the organisation's set-up as outdated and complicated. In 2012, the national coach Matt White was sacked due to his admissions regarding performance-enhancing drugs. Stephen Hodge stepped down as vice-president for similar reasons following the publicity surrounding the Lance Armstrong doping allegations.

The federation suffered financial problems in the early 2010s, after the approval of a strategy in 2010, which attempted to increase Cycling Australia's revenue through a programme of events organisation, led to the organisation making significant losses, compounded by lower than expected sponsorship revenue. Under the subsequent short-term presidency of Orica–GreenEDGE team owner Gerry Ryan, the federation's involvement in events organisation reduced, a new board was appointed and a A$2 million loan package was agreed with the Australian Sports Commission, state affiliates and Mountain Bike Australia.

In November 2020, Cycling Australia was amalgamated with two other national cycling bodies BMX Australia and Mountain Bike Australia to form AusCycling the national sporting organisation representing all cycling disciplines in Australia.

== Departments ==
Cycling Australia had eight operation departments.

- High Performance Unit (HPU)
- Para-Cycling Program
- General Operations
- Marketing & Communications
- Commercial & Events
- Coaching & Development
- Participation
- Sport

== Commissions ==
Cycling Australia had nine advisory and planning commissions.

- Road Commission
- Track Commission
- Master Commission
- Para-cycling Commission
- Cyclo-Cross Commission
- Coaching Commission
- Technical Commission & Officiating
- Athletes Commission
- Women's Commission

== Affiliates ==
Cycling Australia was affiliated with following organisations as of 2013:

- Mountain Bike Australia (MTBA)
- BMX Australia (BMXA)
- AustCycle
- Amy Gillett Foundation

=== State associations ===
There is a bicycle racing body in each Australian state and territory:

- Cycling ACT
- Cycling NSW
- Cycling NT
- Cycling Queensland
- Cycling SA
- Cycling Victoria
- CycleSport Western Australia
- Tasmanian Cycling

== See also ==
- Cycling in Australia
- National Road Series
