= Graham Sycamore =

New Zealand cyclist

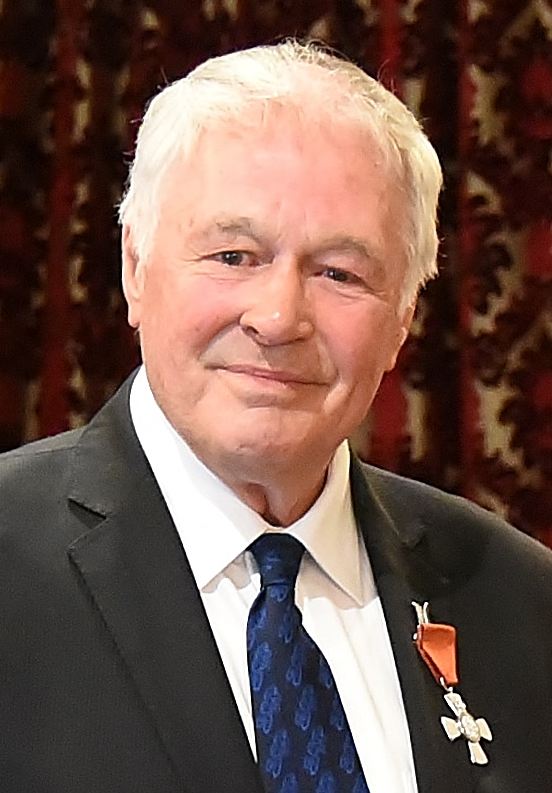
Sycamore in 2016

Graham John Sycamore MNZM (born 1941/42) is a former New Zealand cyclist, international commissaire, and Invercargill city councillor.

Sycamore was an international commissaire for 26 years, attending seven Commonwealth Games, three Olympic Games and two UCI World Championships. His final engagement was the 2012 Summer Olympics in London, after which he was forced to retire by the Union Cycliste Internationale due to his age. He was secretary-general of the Oceania Cycling Confederation from 1992 to 2014, and was made a life member of Cycling Southland and Cycling New Zealand in 1993 and 1999, respectively. He was involved with the Tour of Southland for 52 years, including 12 years as race director.

Sycamore served on the Invercargill City Council from 2001 to 2016. Initially believed to have been re-elected in 2016, he fell short by six votes after the special votes were counted.

Sycamore was awarded a lifetime achievement award at the 2013 Halberg Awards, and appointed a Member of the New Zealand Order of Merit, for services to cycling, in the 2016 Queen's Birthday Honours.
