= Adaptive mountain biking =

Mountain biking for disabled riders

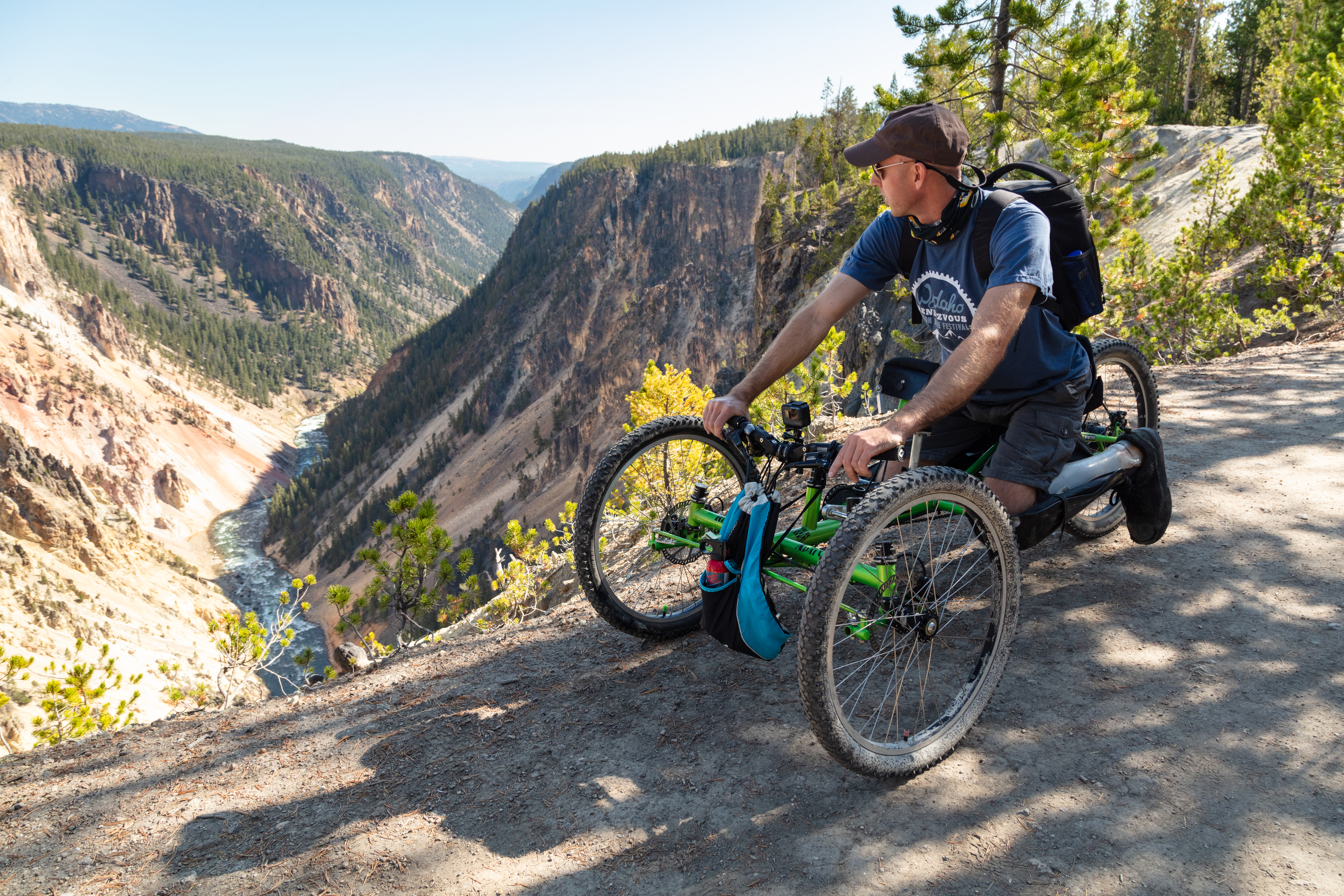
An adaptive rider navigating a trail using an off-road adaptive MTB

Adaptive mountain biking (aMTB) is a form of mountain biking that enables riders with disabilities to participate in off-road cycling. The discipline involves specialized bikes, inclusive trail designs and adaptive programs to allow riders to enjoy off-road trails safely. Adaptive mountain biking has organized events, competitions, and dedicated trails worldwide, and is recognized as a distinct discipline within disability sports.

== History ==
The world's first cited trail designed for adaptive mountain biking is the Jetton Park's Trail Loop in North Carolina, USA. In 2009, a mountain biking club for disabled riders was reported in a piece in The Guardian. By 2020, several mountain bike parks and public land managers had built more trails designed to accommodate adaptive mountain biking. Notable examples include Arklow mountain bike trail in Australia and the Squamish Off-road Cycling Association trails in the United States. In Australia, adaptive cross-country mountain biking (adaptive XC) was included as a racing event in the country's national mountain biking championships in 2017. In the 2024 meet, GWM Mountain Bike National Championships later introduced the adaptive Downhill (adaptive DH) as a competitive discipline.

== Equipment ==
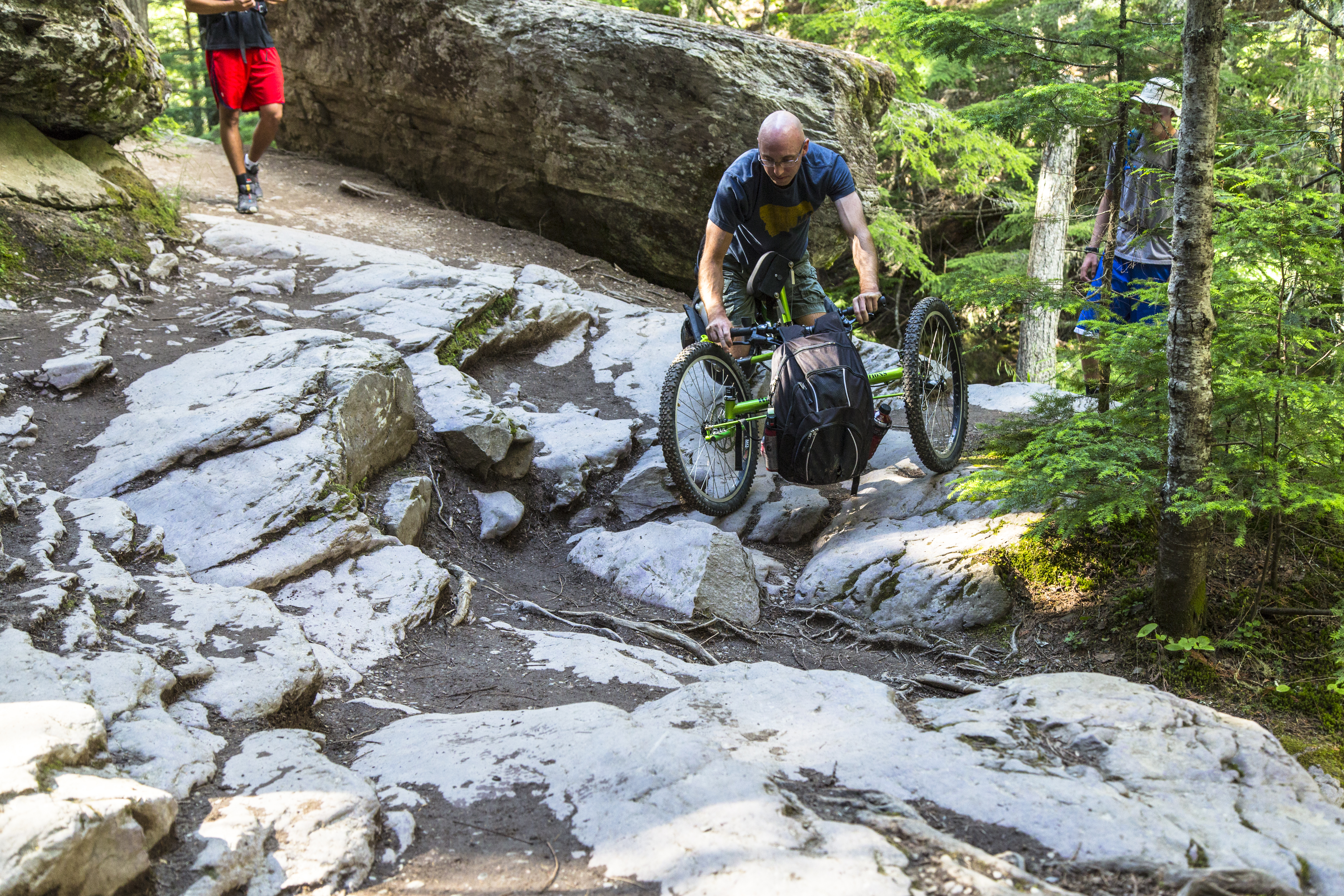
Adaptive rider maneuvering uneven rocky terrain

Specialized mountain bikes exist to meet the needs of riders who are not able to operate a standard mountain bike. Bikes vary in their design and method of propulsion depending on the needs of the rider and intended trails. Some adaptive bikes are pedal-powered, where others propel the bike with hand-cranks, power-assisted pedals, or motors. Adaptive bikes typically have two, three, or four wheels.

== Trail design and accessibility ==
Specially-designed trails called "adaptive" or "accessible" trails have been developed to better accommodate disabled riders. Organisations such as the International Mountain Bicycling Association (IMBA) and AusCycling have published standards to support the creation of safe, accessible, and sustainable adaptive trail designs.

Adaptive trails are typically designed with wider tread, smoother surfaces, and gentler gradients so that adaptive cycles and less-experienced riders can use them. As a result, these trails commonly double as beginner or family-friendly mountain bike routes.

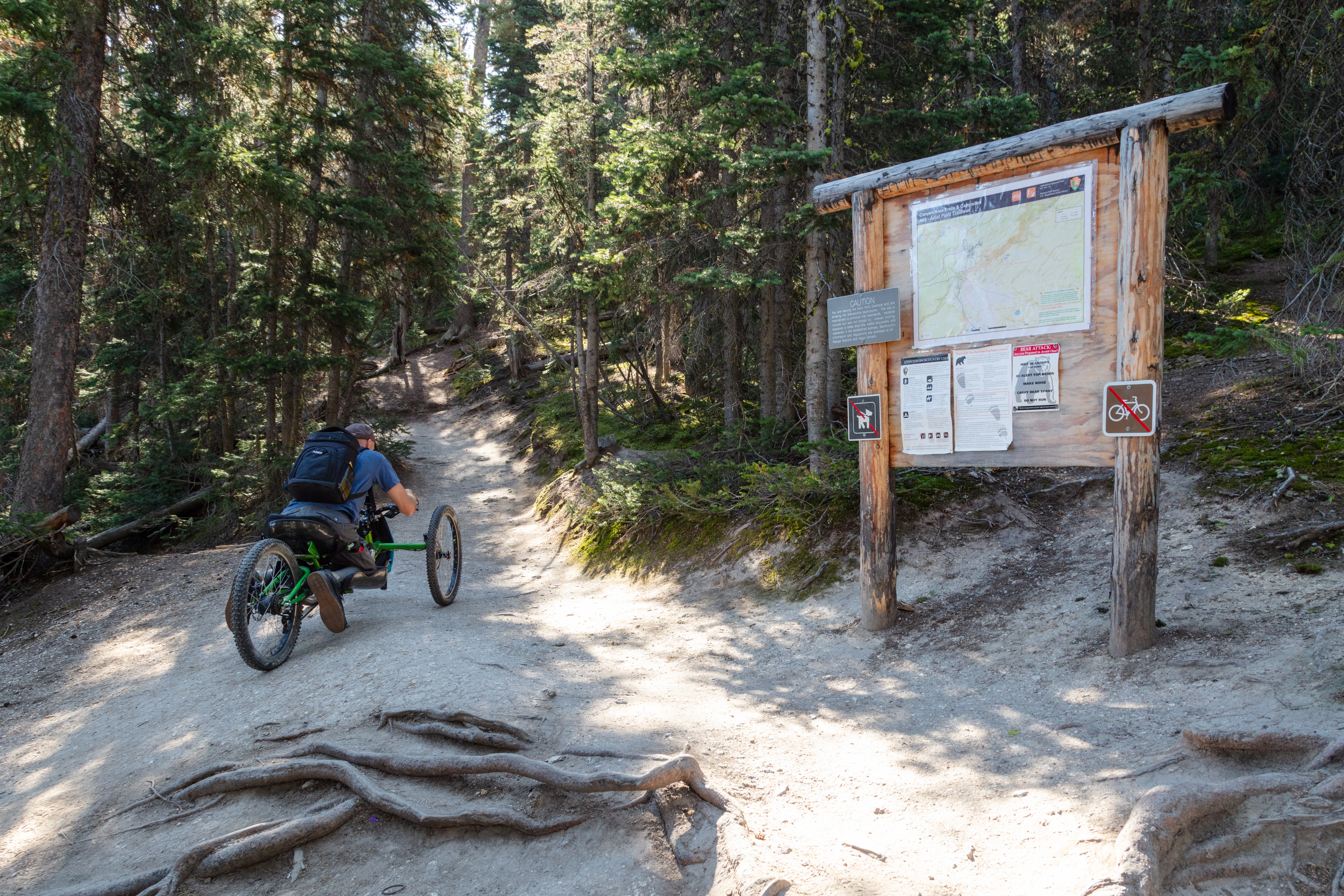
Adaptive rider navigating a mountain trail at Yellowstone National Park

=== Notable adaptive trails ===
A number of locations have constructed trails that are specifically built or modified for adaptive MTB:

==== North America ====
- Jetton Park Trail Loop (North Carolina, USA)
- West Kootenays (British Columbia, Canada)
- Wascana Trails (Saskatchewan, Canada)
- Squamish Off-Road Cycling Association trails (Canada)

==== United Kingdom & Ireland ====
- Old Bob’s (England)
- Dalby Forest (North Yorkshire)
- Coed y Brenin (Wales)

==== Oceania ====
- Fox Creek Bike Park (Australia)
- Rotorua Whakarewarewa loop (New Zealand)
- West Coast Wilderness Trail (New Zealand)
- Kiwarrak Mountain Bike Trail (Australia)
- Arklow Adaptive Trail (Australia)
- Forrest - Southern Networks (Australia)

== Organisations and events ==
- Gravity Adaptive Inc. (Australia) - a non-profit organization that advocates for aMTB trail access, provides rider support and education for disabled riders.
- Adaptive Sports Center (USA) - Hosts the Adaptive Mountain Biking World Championship and the annual Off-Road Handcycling World Championship.
- Vermont Mountain Bike Association (USA) - provides adaptive mountain biking opportunities and hosts events for adaptive cyclists.
- The UNPavement Movement (USA) – An organization that aims "to document trails for adaptive riders".
- Kelly Brush Foundation (USA) - A non-profit that advocate and educates for trails to accommodate the sport. In collaboration with Richmond Mountain Trails and Vermont Mountain Bike Association, it also produced a documentary called "Best Day Ever", that tells the story of two adaptive mountain bikers.
- Kootenay Adaptive Sport Association (Canada) - developed a comprehensive set of standards for safer adaptive trails.

== See also ==
- Para-cycling
- Accessibility
- List of cycleways
