= Zakarin =

Zakarin is a surname. Notable people with the surname include:

- Aydar Zakarin (born 1994), Russian racing cyclist, brother of Ilnur
- Ilnur Zakarin (born 1989), Russian racing cyclist
- Scott Zakarin (born 1963), American writer and film producer
