= Mountain biking in Australia =

Mountain Biking Australia Limited
- Sport: Mountain Biking
- Category: Lifestyle activity
- Jurisdiction: Australia
- Abbreviation: MTBA
- Headquarters: Varsity Lakes, Queensland
- CEO: Shane Coppin

Official website
- www.mtba.org.au
- (Australia)

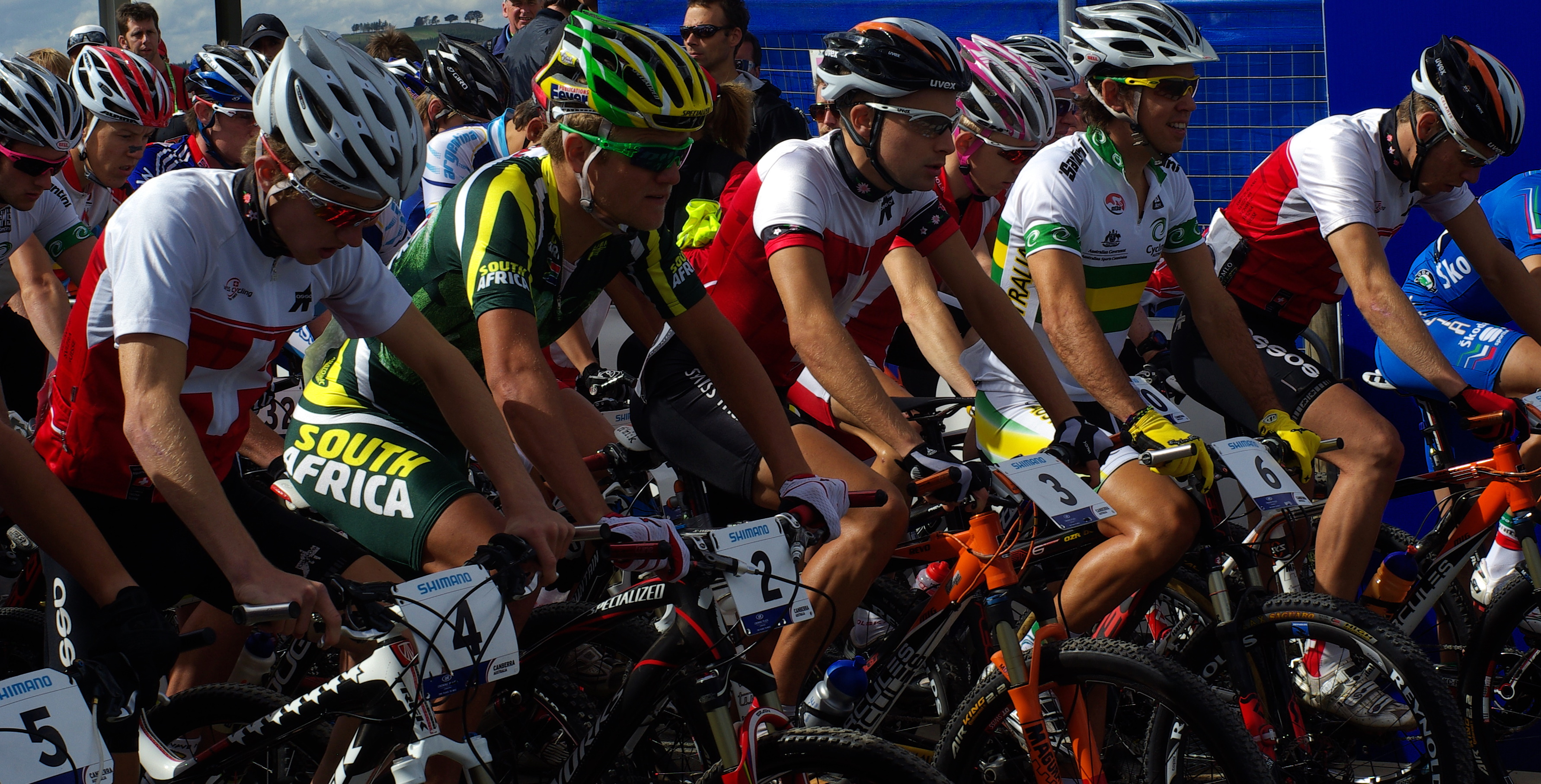
The start of the men's under 23 cross-country event at the 2009 UCI World Mountain Bike Championships in Canberra.

Mountain biking in Australia is a mix of dedicated mountain bike parks, ski resorts with mountain bike facilities, and other parks that have become popular with mountain bikers despite lacking dedicated facilities. The peak body for the sport is Mountain Bike Australia (MTBA). According to AusCycling officials, more people in the country, participate in mountain biking than rugby league and rugby union combined, and is more popular than fishing as a recreational activity. Mountain biking has prompted regional towns to invest heavily in new trails to meet increasing demand for the sport, with local governments viewing mountain biking as a significant driver of tourism revenue.

== Facilities ==
=== Australian Capital Territory ===
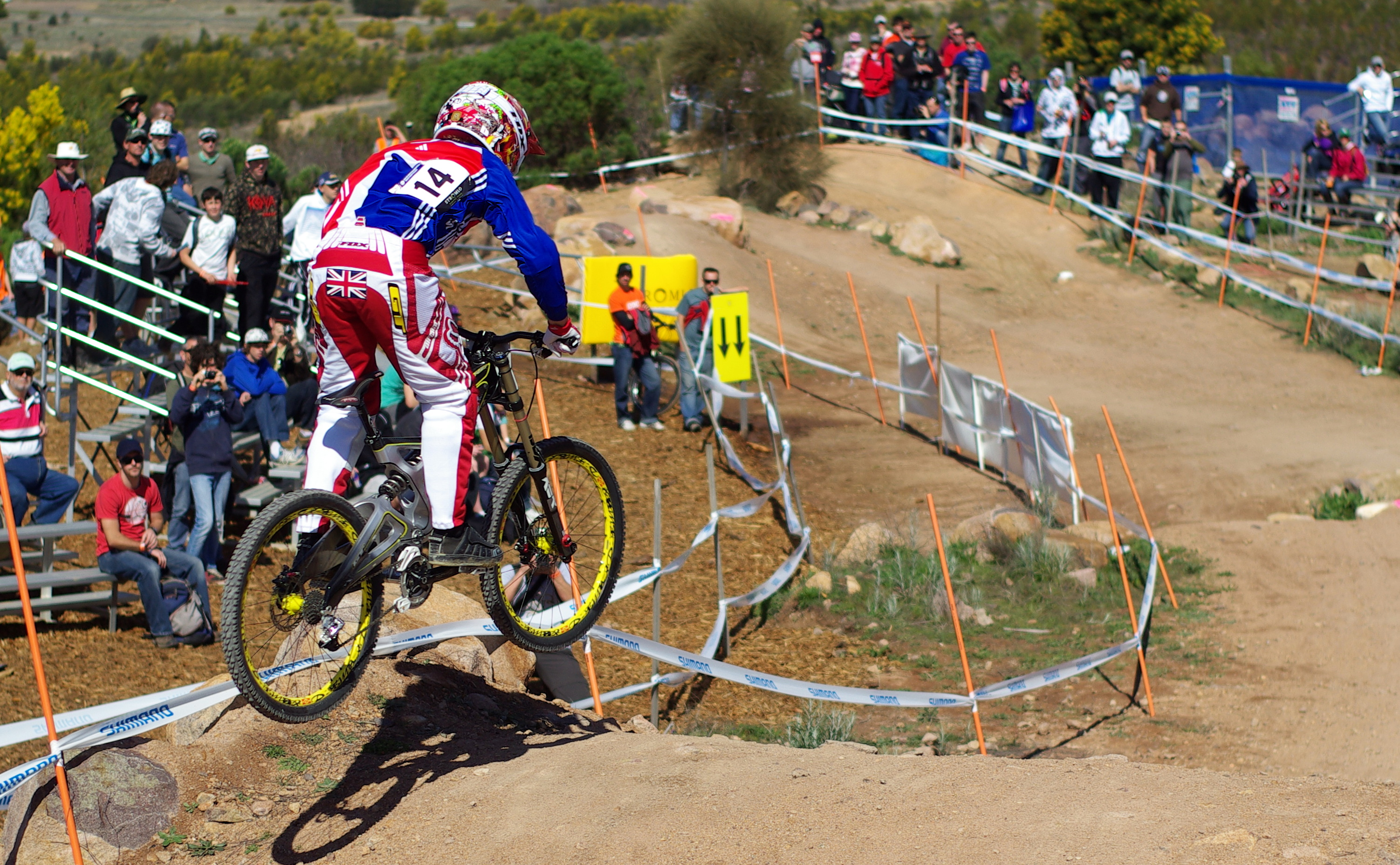
Mount Stromlo's downhill track, during the 2009 UCI World Mountain Bike Championships.

Mount Stromlo Forest Park has international standard tracks including a downhill track, 60 kilometres of cross-country, four-cross track, and a dedicated mountain bike trials course. There is also a testing track known as "the playground" for training and testing demonstration bikes.

- Sparrow Hill, part of Kowen Pine Forest, 11 km from Queanbeyan on the Kings Highway, and 25 minutes from Canberra CBD, has 50 km of world-class cross-country tracks renowned for being fast and flowing, popular with beginner and elite alike. All tracks are named and maintained, and clear signage offers numerous routes of varying length.

=== New South Wales ===
- Manly Dam, Sydney
- Thredbo
- Oaks Fire Trail, Blue Mountains
- Hunter Valley

=== Tasmania ===
Tasmania has a strong mountain biking culture with a large network of tracks around the state including the world class Blue Derby which hosted the Enduro World Series in 2017. Hollybank, Wellington Park and Trevallyn are other popular mountain biking areas.

=== Victoria ===
Since the early 2000s, investment in mountain biking facilities has produced a number of areas of high quality trails. The 2006 Commonwealth Games in particular caused the creation of the Lysterfield Park mountain bike network, including the 6.4 kilometre race circuit. Nearly 60 mountain biking clubs are registered with Mountain Bike Australia. The trail network at Mount Buller is one of only three "IMBA Ride Centers" outside the US designated by the International Mountain Biking Association.

Parks Victoria and the Department of Sustainability and Environment (DSE) have assisted with the creation of trail networks in recent years, such as at Forrest and Lysterfield Park. In 2012, Parks supported the creation of a downhill trail in Kinglake National Park, the first mountain bike trail in a Victorian national park. The trail, Shepherds, follows an existing powerline easement to minimise environmental damage.

From the mid-2000s, a large number of tracks began to be constructed, with support from government agencies, local councils and tourism bodies. Reasons for the growth included the need to replace shrinking or displaced industries (as with the timber industry at Forrest), the need to supplement short ski seasons (as at all the ski resorts except Mount Hotham), the desire to attract more visitors to the national parks (as with Kinglake) and the need for facilities to support a growing sport (as with Lysterfield Park).

Formal trail networks:

Location	XC trails (number)	XC trails (km)	Downhill trails	Lift services
Lysterfield Park	14	21	2	-
You Yangs	15	37.6	2	-
Mount Baw Baw	10	10	1	Shuttle (specific dates)
Mount Buller	16	50+	7	1 lift, 1 shuttle (seasonal)
Falls Creek	4	67.4	(under construction)	1 (specific dates)
Big Hill (Mount Beauty)	14	40-50	2	-
Mount Hotham	?	?	-	-
Lake Mountain	8	15	-	-
Forrest	16	50+	-	-
Beechworth	9	19.2	1 DH, 1 jumps	-
Wombat State Forest	1	23	-	-
Nowa Nowa	7	27.4	-	-
Kinglake	-	-	1 (2 under construction)	-
Erica	?	30	-	-
Colquoun State Forest	?	?	-	-

Other important mountain biking areas include:

Great Dividing Trail
This 280 km hiking trail has several sections which are popular with mountain bikers, especially between Daylesford and Castlemaine.
Wombat State Forest
Site of the annual 100 kilometre endurance event, the Wombat 100.
Dandenong Ranges
Avoca
Site of the annual Marathon Challenge.

==== External links ====
- Bancoora website extensive list of locations with photos and videos of a lot of Victorian trails.
- Trailmate list of locations.
- Mountain Bike Victoria Independent commercial organisation providing a relatively comprehensive list of competition events run by clubs and private promoters.
- Trailforks list of trails & locations across Australia.

== Competitions ==
Major races and other competitions include:

- Wombat 100 – 100 kilometre singletrack/firetrail course held near Woodend each year.
- Marathon Challenge
- Mountain bike orienteering events run by Orienteering Victoria
- Otway Odyssey – 100 kilometre held at Forrest.
- Granite Grind – 4 hour enduro event held at Lake Mountain.
- Bike Buller – a 'festival' of events at Mt Buller.
- Convict 100 – 100 kilometre held in St Albans, New South Wales
- Cape to Cape – Multi Day Endurance ride in Western Australia

== Athletes ==
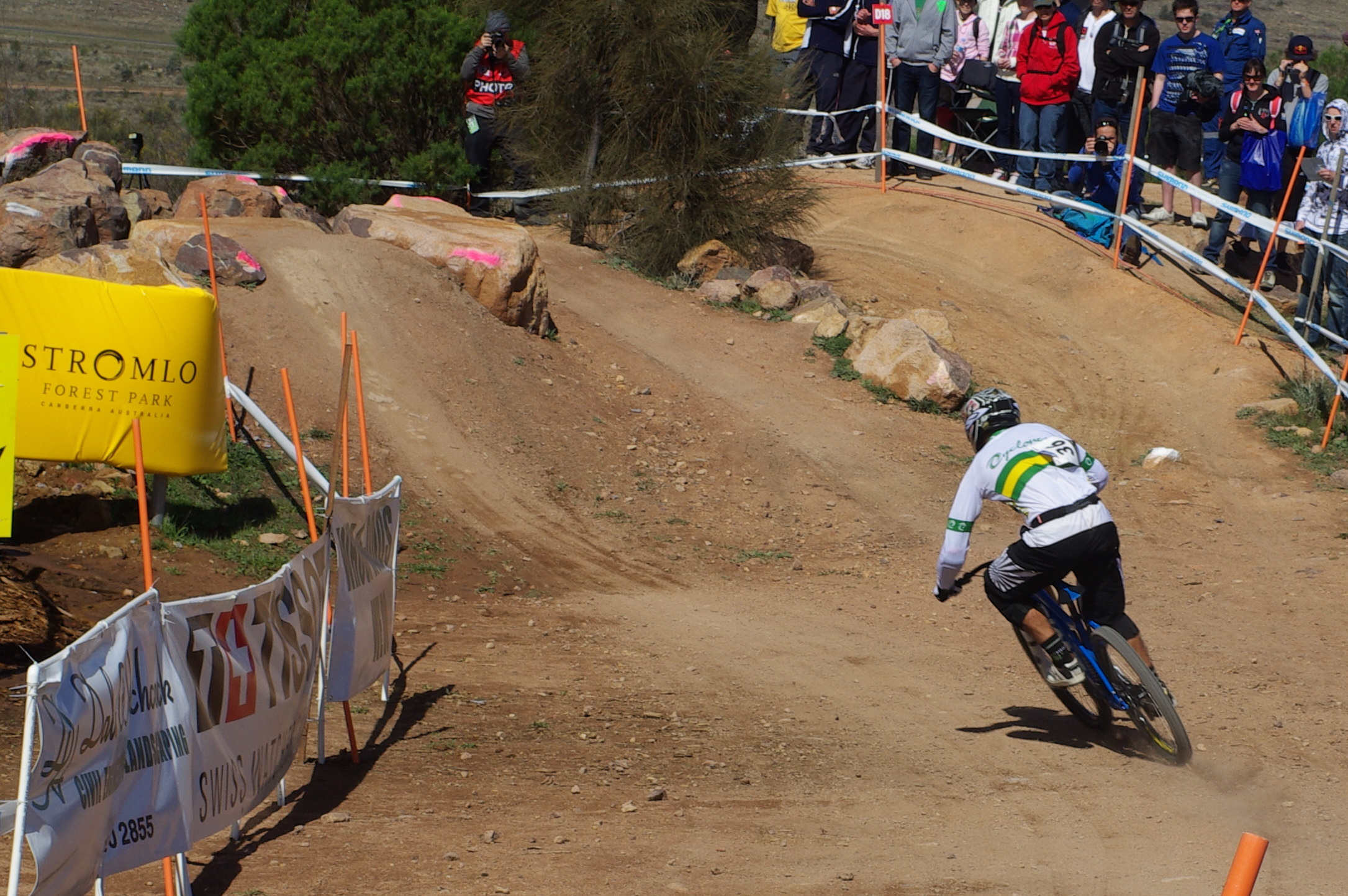
Downhill mountain biker Jared Rando.

Successful Australian mountain bikers include:

- Cadel Evans: competed at the 1996 and 2000 Olympics before switching to road cycling.
- Nathan Rennie: downhill
- Sam Hill: downhill
- Bryn Atkinson: downhill
- Jared Rando: Four-cross and downhill
- Trent Lowe: cross country, switched to road cycling.
- Jared Graves: 2009 Four-cross World Champion
- Caroline Buchanan: 2009, 2010, 2013 Four-cross World Champion; 2013 BMX World Champion. 2013 Australian Cyclist of the Year.
