= 2012 UCI Juniors Track World Championships =

Track cycling event in New Zealand

- Venue: (New Zealand) ILT Velodrome in Invercargill
- Date: 22–26 August 2012

The 2012 UCI Juniors Track World Championships were the 38th annual Junior World Championships for track cycling, held at the ILT Velodrome in Invercargill, New Zealand, from 22 to 26 August.

The Championships had ten events for men (sprint, points race, individual pursuit, team pursuit, 1 kilometre time trial, team sprint, keirin, madison, scratch race, omnium) and nine for women (sprint, individual pursuit, 500 metre time trial, points race, keirin, scratch race, team sprint, team pursuit, omnium).

== Events ==
Event	Gold	Silver	Bronze
Men's Events
Sprint	Jacob Schmid; Australia	Emerson Harwood; Australia	Zachary Shaw; Australia
Points race	Chun Wing Leung; Hong Kong	Aydar Zakarin; Russia	Cristian Cornejo Aliste; Chile
Individual pursuit	Tom Bohli; Switzerland	Dylan Kennett; New Zealand	Alexander Morgan; Australia
Team pursuit	Jack Cummings; Evan Hull; Alexander Morgan; Miles Scotson; Australia	Liam Aitcheson; Dylan Kennett; Hayden McCormick; Hamish Schreurs; New Zealand	Alexey Kurbatov; Andrey Sazanov; Dmitry Strahov; Aydar Zakarin; Russia
Time trial	Zachary Shaw; Australia	Dylan Kennett; New Zealand	Jakub Vyvoda; Czech Republic
Team sprint	Alexander Dubchenko; Vladislav Fedin; Alexander Sharapov; Russia	Emerson Harwood; Jacob Schmid; Zachary Shaw; Australia	Emmanuel Mejia; Oliver Valenzuela; Edgar Verdugo; Mexico
Keirin	Jacob Schmid; Australia	Emerson Harwood; Australia	Alexander Dubchenko; Russia
Madison	Fernando Gaviria; Jordan Parra; Colombia	Jonas Rickaert; Otto Vergaerde; Belgium	Dylan Kennett; Hayden McCormick; New Zealand
Scratch race	Anton Muzychkin; Belarus	Jordan Parra; Colombia	Robert Gaineyev; Kazakhstan
Omnium	Fernando Gaviria; Colombia	Jon Dibben; Great Britain	Tirian McManus; Australia

Event	Gold	Silver	Bronze
Women's Events
Sprint	Daria Shmeleva; Russia	Caitlin Ward; Australia	Paige Paterson; New Zealand
Individual pursuit	Kelsey Robson; Australia	Elinor Barker; Great Britain	Natalia Mozharova; Russia
Time trial	Daria Shmeleva; Russia	Elis Ligtlee; Netherlands	Lidia Pluzhnikova; Russia
Points race	Taylah Jennings; Australia	Sophie Williamson; New Zealand	Amy Roberts; Great Britain
Keirin	Daria Shmeleva; Russia	Lidia Pluzhnikova; Russia	Jennifer Valente; United States
Scratch race	Georgia Baker; Australia	Sophie Williamson; New Zealand	Shana Dalving; Belgium
Team sprint	Lidia Pluzhnikova; Daria Shmeleva; Russia	Paige Paterson; Victoria Steel; New Zealand	Allee Proud; Caitlin Ward; Australia
Team pursuit	Georgia Baker; Taylah Jennings; Kelsey Robson; Australia	Cassie Cameron; Alysha Keith; Racquel Sheath; New Zealand	Elinor Barker; Hayley Jones; Amy Roberts; Great Britain
Omnium	Taylah Jennings; Australia	Elinor Barker; Great Britain	Racquel Sheath; New Zealand

== Medal table ==
* Host nation (New Zealand)

Rank	Nation	Gold	Silver	Bronze	Total
1	Australia (AUS)	9	4	4	17
2	Russia (RUS)	5	2	4	11
3	Colombia (COL)	2	1	0	3
4	Belarus (BLR)	1	0	0	1
4	Hong Kong (HKG)	1	0	0	1
4	Switzerland (SUI)	1	0	0	1
7	New Zealand (NZL)*	0	7	3	10
8	Great Britain (GBR)	0	3	2	5
9	Belgium (BEL)	0	1	1	2
10	Netherlands (NED)	0	1	0	1
11	Chile (CHI)	0	0	1	1
11	Czech Republic (CZE)	0	0	1	1
11	Kazakhstan (KAZ)	0	0	1	1
11	Mexico (MEX)	0	0	1	1
11	United States (USA)	0	0	1	1
Totals (15 entries)		19	19	19	57
