= Cycling Southland =

Cycling Southland is a cycling club based at the SIT Zero Fees Velodrome in Invercargill, New Zealand. It manages all Southland road and track cycling activities at Club and Centre level along with responsibility for delivering events like the SBS Bank Tour of Southland and major national and international track cycling events including Oceania and New Zealand Elite and Age Group Track Cycling Championships.

In 2012 Cycling Southland hosted the 2012 UCI Juniors Track World Championships after the UCI awarded the event to Invercargill, following a joint application by Cycling Southland and BikeNZ.
