= Fiji Cycling Association =

National governing body of cycle racing in Fiji

The Fiji [Amateur] Cycling Association or FACA is the national governing body of cycle racing in Fiji.

The FACA is a member of the UCI and the OCC.
