= Guam Cycling Federation =

National governing body of cycle racing in Guam

The Guam Cycling Federation or GCF is the national governing body of cycle racing in Guam.

The GCF is a member of the UCI and the OCC.
