= Brendan Johnston =

Australian sport cyclist

Personal information
- Born: 25 November 1991 (age 34) Moruya, New South Wales, Australia

Cycling career
- Sport: Cycling
- Current team: Giant Australia Off Road Team
- Disciplines: Gravel; Road; Mountain biking
- Role: Rider

Amateur teams
- 2019: CCS Cycling
- 2019: Stitch and Dart
- 2020–2024: Team CCS Canberra

Professional team
- Giant Australia Off Road Team

Brendan Johnston (born 25 November 1991) is an Australian professional racing cyclist, who primarily competes in gravel, road and mountain bike racing. He has won the national cross-country marathon championships six times, as well as three rounds of the UCI Gravel World Series and the Melbourne to Warrnambool Classic on the road.

Johnston started his career in junior mountain biking, where he saw success at the national level. However, his career was interrupted in 2009 when he was diagnosed with testicular cancer. He recovered and returned to competition in 2011.

== Major results ==
=== Gravel ===
2023
Belgian Waffle Ride

1st Utah
2nd Kansas
4th California

2nd Big Sugar Gravel
2024
1st National Championships
UCI World Series

1st Seven Race

2nd RADL GRVL
4th SBT GRVL
5th Big Sugar Gravel
5th Belgian Waffle Ride California
2025
UCI World Series

1st Gravelista (2024)
1st The Devils Cardigan

1st Salty Lizard
1st RADL GRVL
3rd National Championships
5th Unbound Gravel 200
5th Sea Otter Classic

=== Road ===
2013
5th Road race, National Under-23 Championships
2017
1st Overall National Capital Tour

1st Stage 1

2019
3rd Melbourne to Warrnambool Classic
2020
1st Overall National Road Series
1st Overall Tweed Tour
1st Melbourne to Warrnambool Classic
2023
3rd Road race, National Championships
2024
2nd Hayman Classic

=== Mountain bike ===
2015
National Championships

1st Cross-country marathon
2nd Cross-country

2016
1st Cross-country marathon, National Championships
2017
1st Cross-country marathon, National Championships
2018
2nd Cross-country marathon, National Championships
2019
1st Cross-country marathon, National Championships
2022
1st Cross-country marathon, National Championships
2023
National Championships

3rd Cross-country marathon
3rd Cross-country short track

2024
1st Cross-country marathon, National Championships
