= Rebecca Henderson (cyclist) =

Australian mountain biker

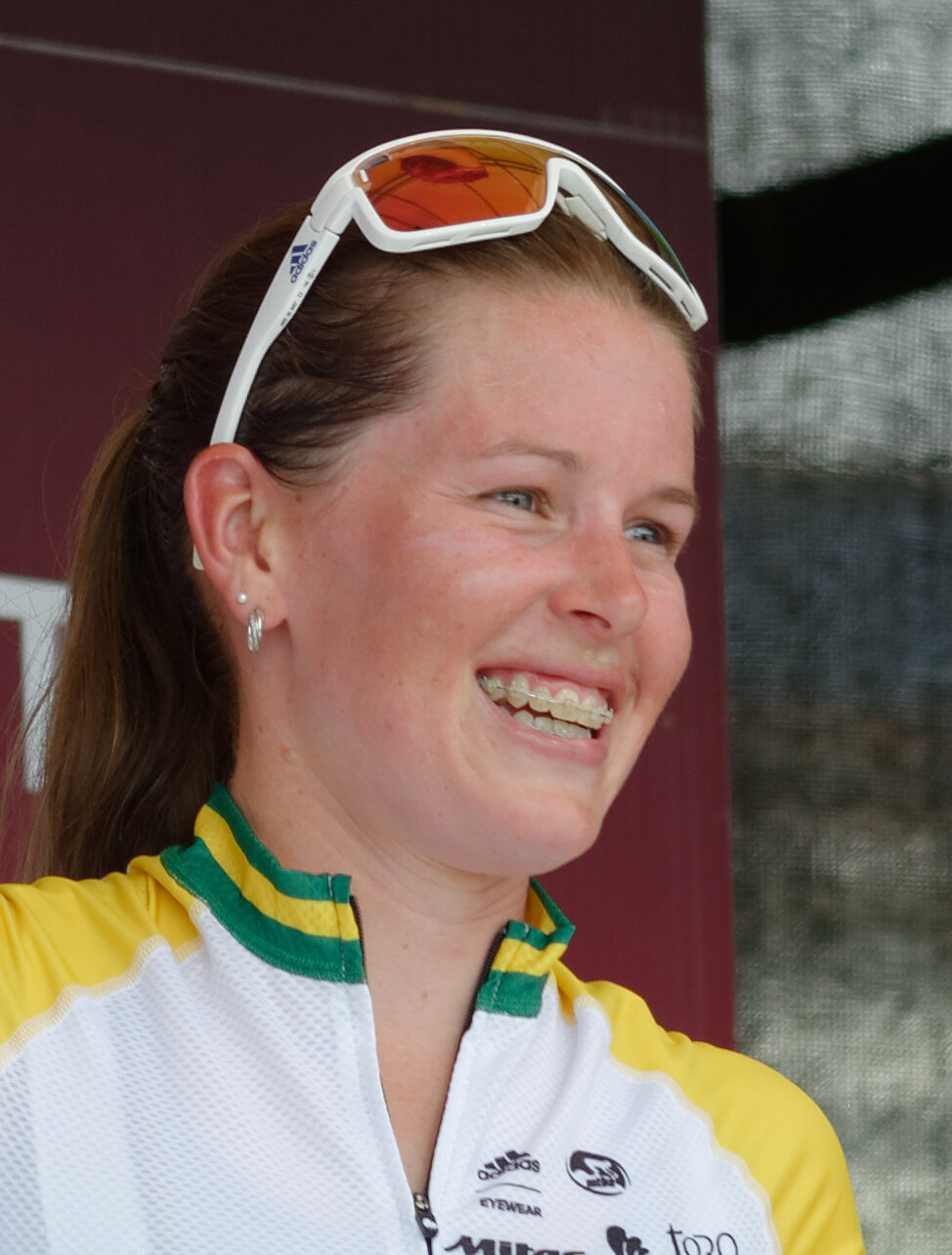
- Henderson in 2017

Personal information
- Nickname: Bec
- Born: 27 September 1991 (age 35) Canberra, Australia
- Height: 158 cm (5 ft 2 in)
- Weight: 49 kg (108 lb)

Cycling career
- Sport: Cycling
- Discipline: Mountain Bike (Cross Country)
- Role: Rider

Amateur teams
- Canberra Off Road Cyclists
- Vikings Cycling Club

Professional teams
- 2013-2015: Trek Factory Racing
- 2016: Trek Factory Racing XC
- 2018-2019: Primaflor Mondraker Rotor
- 2020-2021: Primaflor Mondraker XSauce
- 2022: Primaflor Mondraker Genuins
- 2023: Primaflor Mondraker Genuins Racing Team
- 2024: Primaflor Mondraker Racing Team
- 2025: Orbea Fox Factory Team

Major wins
- Mountain bike XC World Cup 3 individual wins (2022)
Medal record
Women's mountain bike racing
Representing Australia
World Championships
Bronze medal – third place	2019 Mont-Sainte-Anne	Cross-country
Bronze medal – third place	2020 Leogang	Cross-country
Commonwealth Games
Bronze medal – third place	2014 Glasgow	Cross country
Oceania Championship
Gold medal – first place	2011 Shepparton, Australia	Cross country U23
Gold medal – first place	2012 Rotorua, New Zealand	Cross country U23
Gold medal – first place	2013 Hobart, Australia	Cross country U23
Gold medal – first place	2015 Toowoomba, Australia	Cross country
Gold medal – first place	2016 Queenstown, Australia	Cross country
Bronze medal – third place	2017 Toowoomba, Australia	Cross country
Gold medal – first place	2019 Bright, Australia	Cross country
Gold medal – first place	2020 Dunedin, New Zealand	Cross country
Gold medal – first place	2022 Gold Coast, Australia	Cross country
Gold medal – first place	2023 Mount Cotton, Australia	Cross country
Bronze medal – third place	2024 Brisbane, Australia	Cross country
Gold medal – first place	2026 Brisbane, Australia	Cross country

Rebecca Henderson (born 27 September 1991), for some years competing as Rebecca McConnell, is an Australian mountain biker. She represented Australia at the 2012, 2016, 2020 and 2024 Summer Olympics in the Mountain Bike Cross Country event. She came 28th at the 2020 Olympics.

Henderson won a bronze medal at the 2019 and 2020 Mountain Bike World Championships.

== Personal life ==
Nicknamed Bec, Henderson was born on 27 September 1991 in Canberra, Australia. She attended Monash Primary School before going to high school at Mackillop Catholic College. As of 2020, she lives in Canberra, Australia. Henderson is 158 centimetres (62 in) tall and weighs 49 kilograms (108 lb).

She married her coach and partner, Daniel McConnell, in 2017; he is also an Olympian. After they separated, she returned to using her maiden name in early 2023.

== Cycling ==
Henderson is a mountain biker, specialising in cross country events. She started cycling when she was twelve years old. She was coached by Dan McConnell, an Australian male cyclist who was selected to represent Australia at the 2012 Summer Olympics. Her primary cycling base is Canberra She is a member of the Canberra Off Road Cyclists and Vikings Cycling Club ACT. As of June 2012, she was 2nd in the Under 23 World Cup series in 2012 and she is currently ranked 32nd in the World.

Henderson finished 1st at the 2011 U23 Australian Championships in Adelaide, Australia. She finished 1st at the 2011 U23 Oceania Championships in Shepparton, Australia. She finished 7th at the 2011 U23 UCI MTB World Cup in Dalby Forest, England.

Henderson finished 3rd at the 2012 U23 UCI MTB World Cup 5 in Mont Sainte Anne, Canada. She finished 2nd at the 2012 U23 UCI MTB World Cup 4 in La Bresse, France. She finished 13th at the 2012 U23 UCI MTB World Cup 3 in Nové Mesto na Morave, Czech Republic. She finished 3rd at the 2012 U23 UCI MTB World Cup 2 in Houffalize, Belgium.

Henderson has been selected to represent Australia at the 2012 Summer Olympics in the Mountain Bike Cross Country — Women event. She was one of four Canberra cyclists from three different cycling disciplines selected to represent Australia at the Games. Her family was scheduled to travel to London to watch her compete.

Henderson finished third in the cross-country at the 2019 World Championships in Mont Sainte Anne. She repeated her result again at the 2020 World Championships in Leogang.

Henderson was selected to represent Australia in mountain biking at the Tokyo Olympics. She finished the Olympics in 28th place.

2022 was a very successful UCI World Cup season for Henderson; with three wins at the beginning of the season and finishing the season overall in second place. Henderson chose not to attend the 2022 Commonwealth Games in favour of staying fresh and focusing on her World Cup bid.

Henderson was selected to represent Australia in mountain biking at the Paris Olympics. She finished the event in 13th place.

== Career Achievements ==
=== Major Championships ===
Event		2009	2010	2011	2012	2013	2014	2015	2016	2017	2018	2019	2020	2021	2022	2023	2024	2025	
Olympic Games	XCO				24				25				28				13		
Commonwealth Games	XCO		NE				3				6				-				
World Championships	XCO	-	-	20 U23	-	10	15	DNF	48	20	-	3	3	7	26	22	10	11	
World Championships	XCC	-	-	-	-	-	-	-	-	-	-	-	-	6	-	5	9	8	
World Championships	XCE	-	-	-	-	15	-	-	-	-	-	-	-	-	-	-	-	-	-
World Championships	XCM	-	-	-	-	-	-	-	-	-	-	-	-	10	-	-	-	-	-
Oceania Continental Championships	XCO	-	5	1 U23	1 U23	1 U23	-	1	1	3	4	1	1	-	1	1	3	-	1
Australian National Championships	XCO	1 Jnr	1 U23	1 U23	1 U23	1 U23	1	1	1	1	1	1	1	1	1	1	1	1	1
Australian National Championships	XCC	-	-	-	-	-	-	-	1	-	-	-	1	1	1	1	DNF	1	1
Australian National Championships	XCE	-	-	-	-	-	-	2	-	-	-	-	-	-	-	-	-	-	-
Australian National Championships	XCM	-	-	-	-	-	-	-	-	1	-	-	-	-	-	-	-	-	-
Australian National Championships	E-XC	-	-	-	-	-	-	-	-	-	-	-	-	1	-	-	-	-	-
Australian National Championships	Gravel	-	-	-	-	-	-	-	-	-	-	-	-	-	-	-	-	3	-

=== UCI World Cup Results ===
==== 2022 UCI MOUNTAIN BIKE WORLD CUP ====
1st CZ MERCEDES-BENZ UCI MTB WORLD CUP – XCO/XCC Nove Mesto Na Morave / WC
1st DE MERCEDES-BENZ UCI MTB WORLD CUP – XCO/XCC Albstadt / WC
1st BR MERCEDES-BENZ UCI MTB WORLD CUP – XCO/XCC Petropolis / WC
2nd Biker Final Standing 2022

==== Cross-Country Olympic ====
Season	1	2	3	4	5	6	7	8	9	10	Standing	Season Points
2009 Jnr	PIE -	OFF; DNF	HOU; 13	MAD -	MON -	BRO -	CHP -	SCH -			-	-
2010	DLB; 61	HOU; 102	OFF; 78	LAB -	MON -	WIN -					116	9
2011 U23	PIE; 9	DLB; 7	OFF; 7	MON -	WIN -	NOV -	VAL; 11				16	104
2012 U23	PIE; 6	HOU; 3	NOV; 13	LAB; 2	MON; 3	WIN; 2	ISE; 3				2	371
2013 U23	ALB; 1	NOV; 2	VAL; 2	AND; 2	MON; 1	HAF; 4					1	440
2014	PIE; 16	CAI; 10	NOV; 29	ALB; 16	MON; 30	WIN; 28	MER; 15				18	463
2015	NOV; 8	ALB; 8	LEN; 26	MON; 33	WIN -	VAL; DNS					25	314
2016	CAI; 3	ALB; 26	LAB; 8	LEN; 12	MON; 8	AND; 32					9	561
2017	NOV; 8	ALB; 5	AND; 20	LEN; 29	MON; 17	VAL; 23					15	496
2018	STE; 15	ALB; 35	NOV; 26	VAL; DNF	AND -	MON -	LAB -				45	179
2019	ALB; 8	NOV; 2	AND; 20	LES; 8	VAL; 7	LEN; 6	SNO; 4				5	1217
2020	LEN; NH	VAL; NH	LES; NH	NOV; 9	NOV; 4						NP	286
2021	ALB; 7	NOV; 3	LEO; 7	LES; 5	LEN; 2	SNO; 2					4	1215
2022	PET; 1	ALB; 1	NOV; 1	LEO; 7	LEN; 14	AND; 21	SNO; 13	MON; 19	VAL; 19		2	1626
2023	NOV; 8	LEN; 24	LEO; 38	VAL; 3	AND; 12	LES; 8	SNO; 16	MON; 21			11	846
2024	MAI; 19	ARA; 22	NOV; 16	VAL; 21	CRA; 16	SAV; 14	PLA; 5	MON; 11			10	959
2025	ARA -	ARA -	NOV; 5,13	LEO; DNF	VAL; 27,11	AND -	SAV; 4,10	LEN; 18,9	PLA; 19,10	MON; 15,DNF	25	718
