= Tracey Hannah =

Australian mountain biker (born 1988)

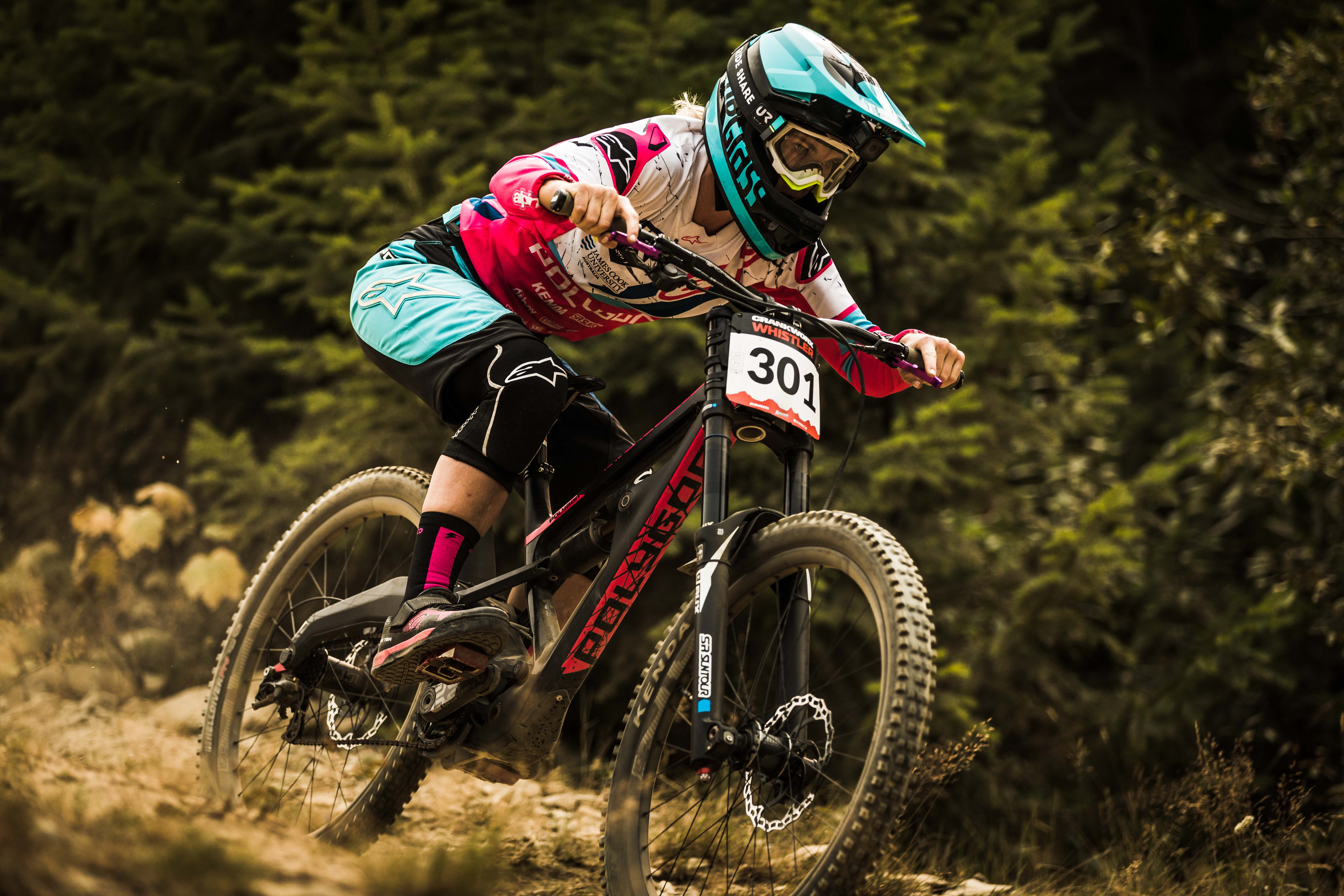
- Hannah in 2018

Personal information
- Born: 13 June 1988 (age 38) Cairns, Australia
- Height: 5 ft 6 in (1.68 m)
- Weight: 116 lb (53 kg)

Cycling career
- Sport: Cycling
- Current team: NS Bikes UR
- Discipline: Mountain biking
- Role: Rider
- Rider type: Downhill
Medal record
Representing Australia
Women's Mountain biking
World Championships
Gold medal – first place	2006 Rotorua	Junior downhill
Bronze medal – third place	2007 Fort William	Downhill
Bronze medal – third place	2013 Pietermaritzburg	Downhill
Bronze medal – third place	2015 Vallnord	Downhill
Bronze medal – third place	2016 Val di Sole	Downhill

Tracey Hannah (born 13 June 1988 in Cairns, Australia) is a professional downhill bike rider. She raced her first national BMX title when she was 4 years old. Tracey chose to do MTB when she saw Mick Hannah (her eldest brother of four) was racing down a hill very fast on an MTB camp in 1997.

When she was 13 her parents let her try downhill riding. As soon as she was 14, she raced for the national titles in elite, and she came in 2nd place. For 7 years, she was Australian National Champion. After that, she started racing overseas and her results were; First in the NORBA Series overall, A Junior World Championship, Third in a World Cup overall, Third in Elite World Championships, and she has won a World Cup Round.

In 2012 her best places were 1st and 2nd out of 7 rounds of the World Cup Series, and she finished 4th Overall. However, she missed out on racing the 6th, and 7th rounds. During practice for the 6th round, she crashed and was helicoptered out to the nearest hospital. She had broken her femur, collarbone, bruised a lung, and had a hematoma.

Her first race, after recovering from her injury, was 7 months later in February 2013. This was the Australian National Championships, and she took first place. She was the National Champion for 2013.

== Team ==
Tracey Hannah is currently racing for the NS bikes UR team as a Downhill rider.

== Achievement ==
- Eleven time Australian National Champion
- 2019
  - 1st 2019 UCI World Cup Champion (DH)
  - 1st UCI World Cup Round 5, Les Gets France
  - 1st UCI World Cup Round 3, Leogang Austria
  - 1st iXS European Cup #1, Maribor Slovenia
  - 1st Crankworx Whistler - Canadian Open DH, Whistler B.C. Canada
  - 1st Crankworx Innsbruck - DH, Innsbruck Austria
  - 1st Crankworx Rotorua - DH, Rotorua New Zealand
  - 1st MTBA - Australian National Championship
- 2018
  - 1st Crankworx Whistler - Canadian Open DH, Whistler B.C. Canada
  - 1st Crankworx Innsbruck - DH, Innsbruck Austria
  - 1st MTBA - Australian National Championship
- 2017
  - 3rd UCI World Championships Elite Women, Cairns Australia
  - 1st UCI World Cup Round 2, Fort William Scotland
  - 1st Crankworx Whistler - Canadian Open DH, Whistler B.C. Canada
  - 1st Crankworx Whistler - Garbonzo DH, Whistler B.C. Canada
  - 1st Crankworx Innsbruck - DH, Innsbruck Austria
  - 1st Crankworx Rotorua - iXS DH, Rotorua New Zealand
- 2016
  - 3rd UCI World Championships Elite Women, Val di Sole Italy
  - 1st Crankworx Whistler - Canadian Open DH, Whistler B.C. Canada
  - 1st MTBA - Australian National Championship
- 2015
  - 3rd UCI World Championships Elite Women, Vallnord Andorra
  - 1st MTBA - Australian National Championship
- 2014
  - 4th Overall UCI World Cup Series
  - 1st Crankworx Whistler - Canadian Open DH, Whistler B.C. Canada
  - 1st MTBA - Australian National Championship
- 2013
  - 3rd UCI World Championships Elite Women, Pietermaritzburg South Africa
  - 1st MTBA - Australian National Championship
  - 1st City Downhill, Bratislava Slovakia
- 2012
  - 4th Overall UCI World Cup Series
  - 1st UCI World Cup round 1, Pietermaritzburg South Africa
  - 1st MTBA - Australian National Championship
- 2007
  - 3rd UCI World Championships Elite Women, Fort William Scotland
  - 3rd Overall UCI World Cup Series
  - 1st UCI World Cup Round 4, Schladming Austria
- 2006
  - Junior UCI World Champion
  - Norba Series Champion
