= Therese Rhodes =

Australian cyclist

Personal information
- Born: 10 April 1988 (age 38)

Cycling career
- Sport: Cycling
- Discipline: Cyclo-cross
- Role: Rider

Therese Rhodes (born 10 April 1988) is an Australian female cyclo-cross cyclist. She represented her nation in the women's elite event at the 2016 UCI Cyclo-cross World Championships in Heusden-Zolder.
