= Scott Bowden =

Australian cyclist (born 1995)

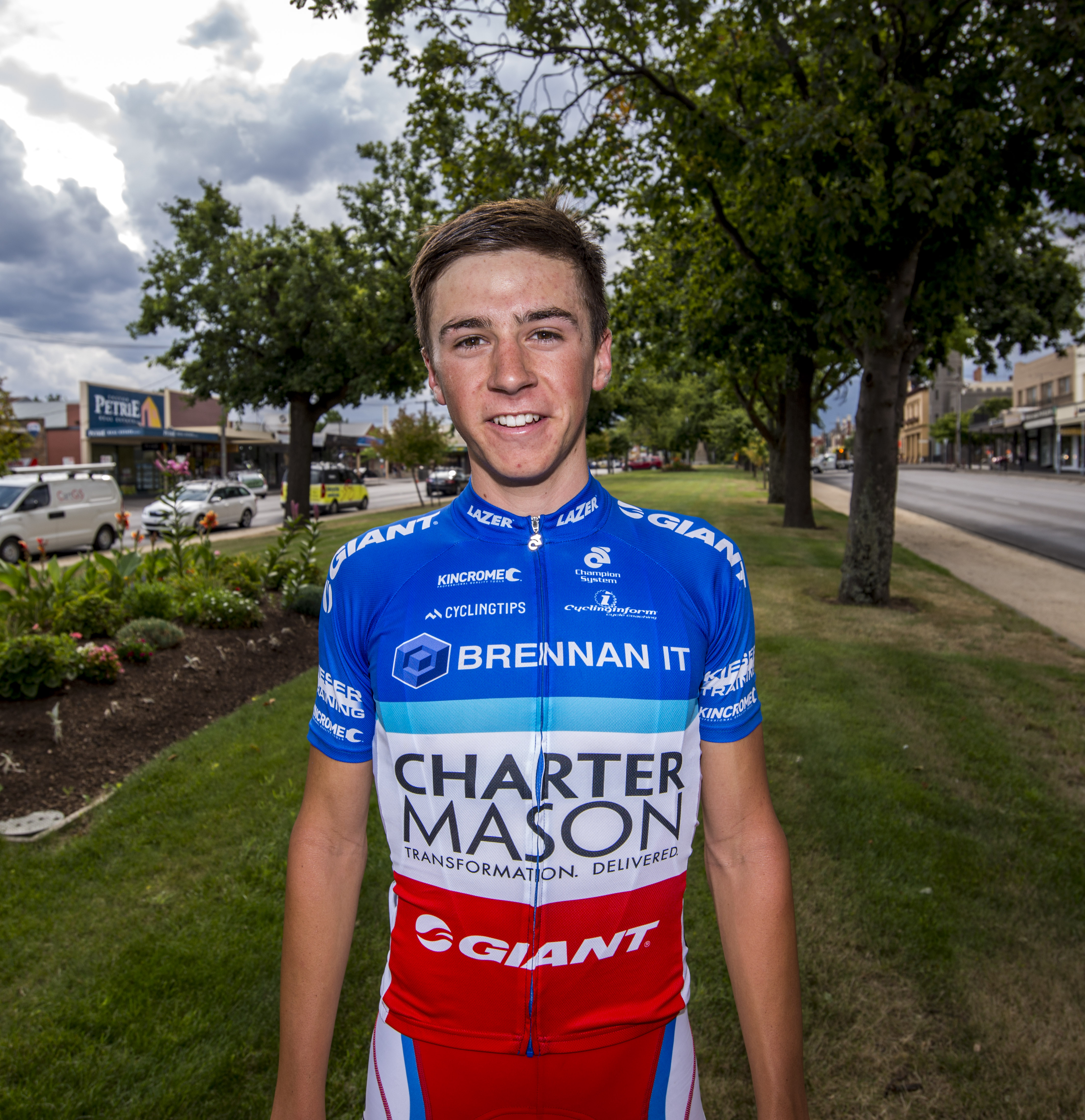

Personal information
- Full name: Scott Bowden
- Born: 4 April 1995 (age 31) Hobart, Australia
- Height: 1.75 m (5 ft 9 in)
- Weight: 65 kg (143 lb)

Cycling career
- Sport: Cycling
- Current team: Bourg-en-Bresse Ain Cyclisme
- Disciplines: Road; Mountain biking
- Role: Rider

Amateur team
- 2021–: Bourg-en-Bresse Ain Cyclisme

Professional teams
- 2017–2018: IsoWhey Sports SwissWellness
- 2019–2020: Team BridgeLane

Scott Bowden (born 4 April 1995) is an Australian mountain biking and road cyclist, who currently rides for French amateur team Bourg-en-Bresse Ain Cyclisme. He rode in the road race and the cross-country at the 2016 Summer Olympics, representing Australia. Bowden first started cycling while he was a student at St. Virgil's College, Tasmania.

== Major results ==
2015
1st Cross-country, Oceania Under-23 Mountain Bike Championships
2016
1st Cross-country, National Under-23 Mountain Bike Championships
2017
6th Road race, National Under-23 Road Championships
2019
6th Road race, National Road Championships
9th Overall Tour of China II
2021
3rd Road race, National Road Championships
