= Wombat 100 =

Australian mountain biking event

The Wombat 100 is an endurance mountain biking event held each year since 2008 in Wombat State Forest, in western central Victoria, Australia. The main race is set on a 100 kilometre course with minimal repetition. The exact route changes each year, but usually features roughly equal parts of singletrack and firetrail or dirt road, with no asphalt. Categories include men, women, elite, veterans, juniors (on a much shorter course) and cyclocross.

== Winners ==
Year	Men's elite	Women's elite
2012 "Wombat 100"	Shaun Lewis	Jenny Fay
2011 (not held)
2010 "Dirt Works 100km"	Robbie Hucker	Jenni King
2009 "BMC 100km Classic"	Matthew Fleming	Tory Thomas
2008 "BMC 100km Classic"	Murray Spink	Jo Wall
