= Mountain Bike Australia =

Mountain Bike Australia Ltd.
- Sport: Mountain Biking
- Jurisdiction: Australia
- Abbreviation: MTBA
- Headquarters: Gold Coast, Queensland
- Chairperson: Lee Brentzell
- CEO: Shane Coppin
- Closure date: 31 October 2020

Official website
- www.mtba.org.au
- (Australia)

Mountain Bike Australia (MTBA) was the peak body responsible for the governance, promotion and advocacy of mountain biking in Australia. MTBA gained National Sporting Organisation (NSO) status from the Australian Sports Commission (ASC) in November 2017.

MTBA covers an array of disciplines including cross-country (XCO), downhill (DHI), observed trials (OT), cross-country marathon (XCM), cyclo-cross (CX). There are currently over 15,000 members, 175 affiliated clubs and private promoters, over 400 coaches/skills instructors and 200 officials supporting the activity of mountain biking in Australia. MTBA is a member owned organisation operating under a unitarian governance model. The organisation also sets the Australian MTB Trail Guidelines which includes the Trail Difficulty Rating System (TDRS), that is used to measure the difficulty level of a trail.

== History ==
In November 2020, Mountain Bike Australia was amalgamated with two other national cycling bodies BMX Australia and Cycling Australia to form AusCycling the national sporting organisation representing all cycling disciplines in Australia.

== Mountain Bike Competition Types ==
- Cross-Country Olympic (XCO)
- Cross-Country Short Course (XCC)
- Cross-Country Marathon (XCM)
- Cross-Country Eliminator (XCE)
- Super D (SD)
- Cross-Country Enduro (XCEN)
- Cross-Country Point-to-Point (XCP)
- Cross-Country Stage Race (XCS)
- Downhill (DHI)
- Gravity Enduro (GE)
- Four Cross (4X)
- Observed Trials (OT)
- Cyclo-Cross (CX)
