= Aydar Zakarin =

Russian cyclist (born 1994)

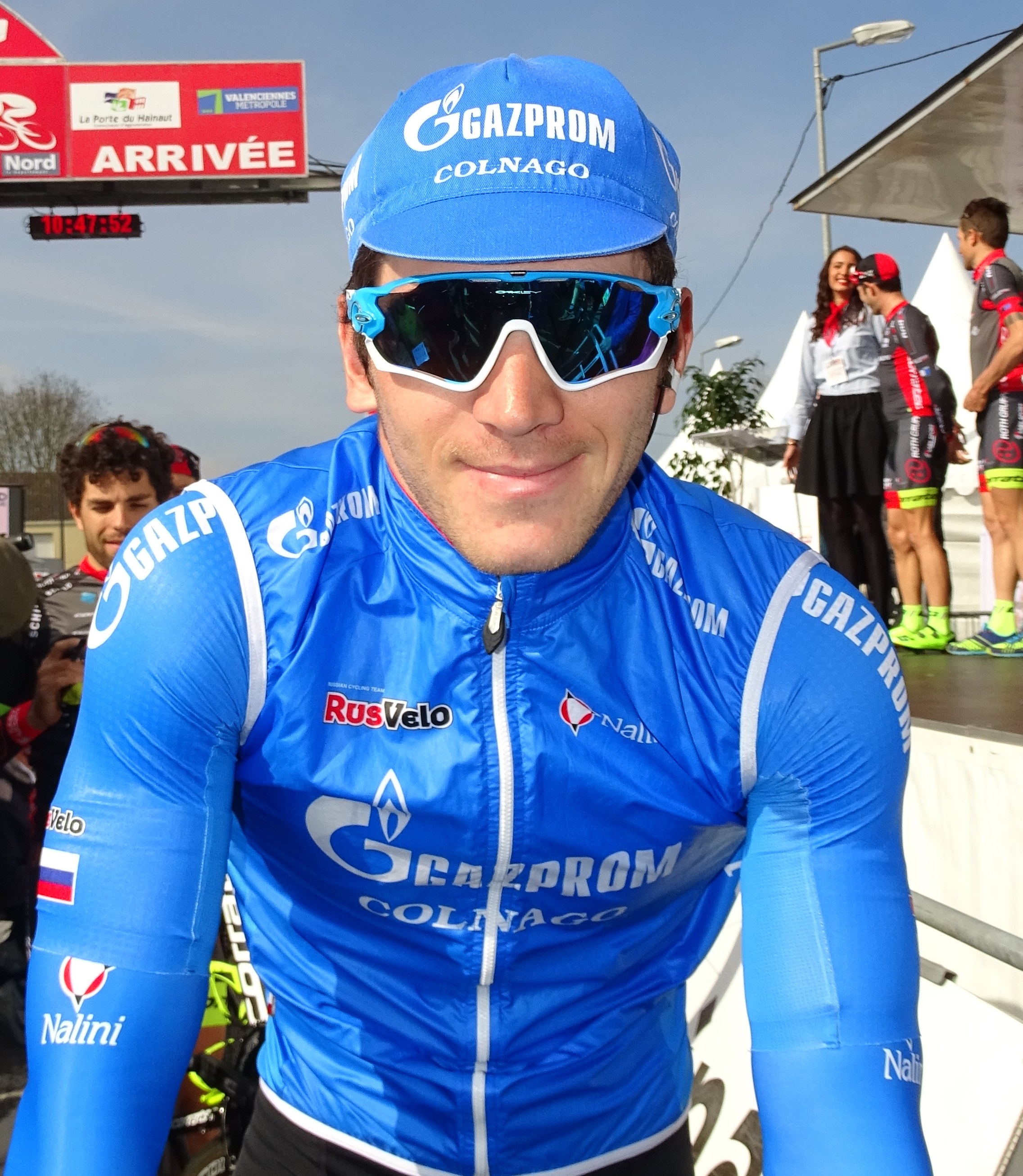
- Zakarin in 2016.

Personal information
- Full name: Aydar Azatovich Zakarin; Russian: Айдар Азатович Закарин
- Born: 19 April 1994 (age 32) Lipetsk, Russia

Cycling career
- Sport: Cycling
- Current team: Retired
- Discipline: Road
- Role: Rider

Professional teams
- 2013: Russian Helicopters
- 2014: Itera–Katusha
- 2016–2017: Gazprom–RusVelo
- 2017: Lokosphinx

Aydar Azatovich Zakarin (Russian: Айдар Азатович Закарин; born 19 April 1994 in Lipetsk) is a Russian former professional cyclist, who rode professionally between 2013 and 2017 for the Russian Helicopters, Itera–Katusha, Gazprom–RusVelo and Lokosphinx teams. His brother Ilnur Zakarin has also competed professionally as a cyclist.
