= AusCycling =

Name of peak body for bicycle racing in Australia

- Sport: Cycling
- Jurisdiction: Australia
- Founded: 1 November 2020
- Affiliation: UCI
- Affiliation date: 1 November 2020
- Regional affiliation: OCC
- Affiliation date: 1 November 2020
- Headquarters: Melbourne, Victoria
- Chairperson: Craig Bingham
- CEO: Marne Fechner

Official website
- www.auscycling.org.au
- (Australia)

AusCycling, the trading name of the AusCycling Limited, is the national governing body for cycling in Australia, and represents the interests of affiliated cycling clubs and its individual members. AusCycling covers the disciplines of road, track, mountain bike, cyclo-cross, BMX, BMX freestyle, e-cycling sports, para-cycling, and recreational and commuter riding.

AusCycling was formed on 1 November 2020 when Cycling Australia, Mountain Bike Australia, and BMX Australia merged to form the one organisation. The inaugural chief executive is Marne Fechner, appointed with effect from 1 February 2021.

AusCycling is a member of the Union Cycliste Internationale (UCI) and the Oceania Cycling Confederation (OCC). It is also recognised by the Australian Government, the Australian Olympic Committee, the Australian Commonwealth Games Association and the Australian Paralympic Committee.

The vision of AusCycling is to make Australia a nation of bike riders, to advocate for riders' safety, build strong club communities and to make all forms of cycling accessible to everyone be it on a track, off a jump, in the great Australian bush or on the road. As of 2021, AusCycling represented over 52,000 members throughout Australia.

== History ==
In late 2011, federal Sports Minister Kate Lundy called for an investigation into Cycling Australia. A review by Justice James Wood produced a 95-page report which described the organisation's set-up as outdated and complicated. In 2012, the national coach Matt White was sacked due to his admissions regarding performance-enhancing drugs. Stephen Hodge stepped down as vice-president for similar reasons following the publicity surrounding the Lance Armstrong doping allegations. Cycling Australia suffered financial problems in the early 2010s, after the approval of a strategy in 2010, which attempted to increase Cycling Australia's revenue through a program of event organisation, led to the organisation making significant losses, compounded by lower than expected sponsorship revenue. Under the subsequent short-term presidency of Gerry Ryan, team owner of Orica–GreenEDGE, Cycling Australia's involvement in event organisation reduced, a new board was appointed and an A$2 million loan package was agreed with the Australian Sports Commission, state affiliates and Mountain Bike Australia.

In the wake of this history, Cycling Australia and all its state affiliates, BMX Australia, and Mountain Bike Australia, resolved to form AusCycling. Cycling Australia, BMX Australia and Mountain Bike Australia were dissolved with effect from 31 October 2020, and AusCycling was formed with effect from 1 November 2020.

== Organisational structure ==
In accordance with its Constitution, AusCycling has established the following organisational structure:

- National advisory council
- State advisory council, for each state and territory in Australia

== See also ==
- Cycling in Australia
- National Road Series
