= Oceania Cycling Confederation =

Regional governing body for the sport of cycling in the continent of Oceania

The Oceania Cycling Confederation (OCC) is recognised by the Union Cycliste International (UCI) as the regional governing body for the sport of cycling in the continent of Oceania. The OCC is one of five continental confederations recognised by the UCI, encompassing the continents of Africa, Asia, Europe, Oceania and Pan-America. The OCC is headquartered in Melbourne.

== Management ==
Presidents

Name	Nation	Years
Tony Mitchell	New Zealand	2021 - Current
Tracey Gaudry	Australia	2012 - 2021
Michael Turtur	Australia	2008 - 2012
Ray Godkin	Australia	1986 - 2008

Tony Mitchell is the current president of the Oceania Cycling Confederation, elected in 2021. He replaced dual Australian Olympian Tracey Gaudry who served in the role from December 2012 to Match 2021. Gaudry replaced Michael Turtur who served between a four-year term between 2008 and 2012, following Ray Godkin, who served for 22 years since the inception of the confederation in 1986.

Executive Board

Name	Nation	Position
Tony Mitchell	New Zealand	President
Eric Tydingco	Guam	Vice President
Tracey Gaudry	Australia	Member
Patrick Keenan	Fiji	Member
Anne Gripper	Australia	Member

Representatives on UCI Management Committee

Name	Nation	Team	
Tony Mitchell	New Zealand	2017 - Present	Elected at 2017 UCI Congress
Anne Gripper	Australia	2021 - Present	Elected at 2021 UCI Congress

== Oceania Cycling Championships ==
The Oceania Cycling Confederation organises all Oceania Cycling Championships. As of 2019 the OCC organises championships in track cycling, road cycling, mountain biking, BMX racing, and freestyle BMX.

== Events ==
The Oceania Cycling Confederation oversees the UCI Oceania Tour a series of UCI road races in Australia and New Zealand and organises the Oceania Pacific Calendar a series of races in the Pacific.

== Member Federations ==
As of 2026 the Oceania Cycling Confederation comprises fifteen member federations - 13 full members and 3 associate members.

Full Members

Country	Federation
American Samoa	American Samoa Cycling Federation
Australia	AusCycling
Cook Islands	Cook Islands Cycling Federation
Fiji	Cycling Fiji
Guam	Guam Cycling Federation
Kiribati	Kiribati Cycling Federation
Nauru	Nauru Cycling Federation
New Zealand	Cycling New Zealand
Palau	Belau Cycling Federation
Samoa	Cycling Federation of Samoa
Solomon Islands	Solomon Islands Cycling Federation
Tonga	Cycling Federation of Tonga
Vanuatu	Vanuatu Cycling Federation

Associate Members

Country	Federation
New Caledonia	Comité Régional de Cyclisme Nouvelle-Calédonie
Northern Mariana Islands	Northern Mariana Islands Cycling Federation
French Polynesia	Fédération Tahitienne de Cyclisme
