= 2016 UCI Road World Championships – Women's time trial =

Women's time trial
2016 UCI Road World Championships
- Time trial Rainbow jersey

Race details
- Dates: 11 October 2016
- Stages: 1
- Distance: 28.9 km (18.0 mi)
- Winning time: 36' 37"

Medalists
	Gold	Amber Neben (USA)
	Silver	Ellen van Dijk (NED)
	Bronze	Katrin Garfoot (AUS)

The Women's time trial of the 2016 UCI Road World Championships took place in and around in Doha, Qatar on 11 October 2016. The course of the race was 28.9 km (18.0 mi). Linda Villumsen won her first world time trial title in 2015 but did not take part in the 2016 race.

2008 world champion Amber Neben, from the United States, claimed her second rainbow jersey, completing the course 5.99 seconds quicker than the European champion Ellen van Dijk, from the Netherlands. Australia's Katrin Garfoot, the Oceanian champion, won the bronze medal, 2.33 seconds behind van Dijk and 8.32 seconds in arrears of Neben's winning time.

== Qualification ==
=== Qualification for the event ===
All National Federations were allowed to enter four riders for the race, with a maximum of two riders to start. In addition to this number, the outgoing World Champion, the Olympic champion and the current continental champions were also able to take part.

Champion	Name	Note
European Champion	Ellen van Dijk (NED)	
Oceanian Champion	Katrin Garfoot (AUS)	
Outgoing World Champion	Linda Villumsen (NZL)	Did not compete
Pan American Champion	Serika Gulumá (COL)	Did not compete
African Champion	Vera Adrian (NAM)	Did not compete
Asian Champion	Mayuko Hagiwara (JPN)	Did not compete
Olympic Champion	Kristin Armstrong (USA)	Did not compete

== Schedule ==
All times are in Arabia Standard Time (UTC+3).

Date	Time	Event
11 October 2016	13:30–16:45	Women's time trial

== Final classification ==
Rank	Rider	Country	Time
1	Amber Neben	United States	36' 37"
2	Ellen van Dijk	Netherlands	+ 5"
3	Katrin Garfoot	Australia	+ 8"
4	Olga Zabelinskaya	Russia	+ 11"
5	Annemiek van Vleuten	Netherlands	+ 25"
6	Lisa Brennauer	Germany	+ 57"
7	Trixi Worrack	Germany	+ 1' 11"
8	Ann-Sophie Duyck	Belgium	+ 1' 27"
9	Katarzyna Pawłowska	Poland	+ 1' 36"
10	Alena Amialiusik	Belarus	+ 1' 41"
11	Lotta Lepistö	Finland	+ 1' 57"
12	Carmen Small	United States	+ 2' 02"
13	Anna van der Breggen	Netherlands	+ 2' 11"
14	Hannah Barnes	United Kingdom	+ 2' 23"
15	Elena Cecchini	Italy	+ 2' 30"
16	Emilia Fahlin	Sweden	+ 2' 30"
17	Julie Leth	Denmark	+ 2' 31"
18	Ashleigh Moolman	South Africa	+ 2' 45"
19	Karol-Ann Canuel	Canada	+ 2' 48"
20	Cecilie Uttrup Ludwig	Denmark	+ 2' 53"
21	Eri Yonamine	Japan	+ 3' 01"
22	Audrey Cordon	France	+ 3' 14"
23	Olena Pavlukhina	Azerbaijan	+ 3' 21"
24	Olga Shekel	Ukraine	+ 3' 28"
25	Hayley Simmonds	United Kingdom	+ 3' 47"
26	Valeriya Kononenko	Ukraine	+ 3' 58"
27	Anastasiia Iakovenko	Russia	+ 4' 02"
28	Anna Turvey	Ireland	+ 4' 14"
29	Nicole Hanselmann	Switzerland	+ 4' 15"
30	Sheyla Gutiérrez	Spain	+ 4' 55"
31	Varvara Fasoi	Greece	+ 5' 09"
32	Samantha Sanders	South Africa	+ 5' 55"
33	Mossana Debesai	Eritrea	+ 6' 53"
34	Ebtissam Mohamed	Egypt	+ 8' 15"
35	Wehazit Kidane	Eritrea	+ 8' 56"
36	Guo Hong	China	+ 9' 42"
37	Sun Jiajun	China	+ 10' 13"
38	Najla Aljeraiwi	Kuwait	+ 10' 19"
39	Beatha Ingabire	Rwanda	+ 13' 25"
40	Nada Aljeraiwi	Kuwait	+ 15' 10"
DSQ	Phetdarin Somrat	Thailand	—
