= 2014 Tour of Adygeya =

Race details
- Dates: 22–25 May
- Stages: 4

The 2014 Tour of Adygeya is a stage race held in Russia, with a UCI rating of 2.2. It was the twelfth stage race of the 2014 Women's Elite cycling calendar.

== Stages ==
=== Stage 1 ===
22 May 2014 — Kamennomostskiy to Pobeda, 10 km (6.2 mi), individual time trial (ITT)

Stage 1 Result and General Classification after Stage 1

	Rider	Team	Time
1	Natalia Boyarskaya (RUS)	Servetto Footon	19' 57"
2	Anna Zavershinskaya (RUS)		+ 1' 12"
3	Aušrinė Trebaitė (LTU)		+ 1' 16"
4	Anna Evseeva (RUS)		+ 1' 16"
5	Marina Likhanova (RUS)	Servetto Footon	+ 1' 26"
6	Yulia Iliynkh (RUS)	Bizkaia–Durango	+ 1' 30"
7	Tatiana Shamanova (RUS)		+ 1' 33"
8	Kseniya Dobrynina (RUS)	Astana BePink	+ 1' 45"
9	Irina Molicheva (RUS)		+ 1' 52"
10	Ekaterina Malomoura (RUS)		+ 1' 53"

=== Stage 2 ===
23 May 2014 — Maykop to Pobeda, 128.9 km (80.1 mi)

Stage 2 Result

	Rider	Team	Time
1	Natalia Boyarskaya (RUS)	Servetto Footon	3h 36' 48"
2	Anna Zavershinskaya (RUS)		s.t.
3	Tatiana Shamanova (RUS)		+ 7"
4	Kseniya Dobrynina (RUS)	Astana BePink	+ 10"
5	Aušrinė Trebaitė (LTU)		+ 12"
6	Anastasia Iakovenko (RUS)		+ 12"
7	Valentina Nesterova (RUS)		+ 13"
8	Alexandra Chekina (RUS)		+ 13"
9	Marina Likhanova (RUS)	Servetto Footon	+ 13"
10	Marina Utkina (RUS)		+ 19"

General Classification after Stage 2

	Rider	Team	Time
1	Natalia Boyarskaya (RUS)	Servetto Footon	3h 56' 35"
2	Anna Zavershinskaya (RUS)		+ 1' 16"
3	Aušrinė Trebaitė (LTU)		+ 1' 36"
4	Tatiana Shamanova (RUS)		+ 1' 46"
5	Anna Evseeva (RUS)		+ 1' 47"
6	Marina Likhanova (RUS)	Servetto Footon	+ 1' 49"
7	Kseniya Dobrynina (RUS)	Astana BePink	+ 2' 05"
8	Ekaterina Malomoura (RUS)		+ 2' 24"
9	Alexandra Chekina (RUS)		+ 2' 33"
10	Marina Utkina (RUS)		+ 2' 38"

=== Stage 3 ===
24 May 2014 — Maykop to Maykop, 96.2 km (59.8 mi)

Stage 3 Result

	Rider	Team	Time
1	Tereza Trefná (CZE)		2h 34' 43"
2	Yelyzaveta Oshurkova (UKR)	Servetto Footon	s.t.
3	Alexandra Chekina (RUS)		s.t.
4	Anatstaiya Chulkova (RUS)	RusVelo	s.t.
5	Kseniya Dobrynina (RUS)	Astana BePink	s.t.
6	Elena Gogoleva (RUS)		s.t.
7	Yulia Iliynkh (RUS)	Bizkaia–Durango	s.t.
8	Yulia Blindyuk (RUS)	RusVelo	s.t.
9	Natalia Zaharova (RUS)		s.t.
10	Ksenia Tuhai (BLR)		s.t.

General Classification after Stage 3

	Rider	Team	Time
1	Natalia Boyarskaya (RUS)	Servetto Footon	6h 31' 17"
2	Anna Zavershinskaya (RUS)		+ 1' 17"
3	Aušrinė Trebaitė (LTU)		+ 1' 37"
4	Tatiana Shamanova (RUS)		+ 1' 47"
5	Anna Evseeva (RUS)		+ 1' 48"
6	Marina Likhanova (RUS)	Servetto Footon	+ 1' 50"
7	Kseniya Dobrynina (RUS)	Astana BePink	+ 2' 05"
8	Ekaterina Malomoura (RUS)		+ 2' 25"
9	Alexandra Chekina (RUS)		+ 2' 26"
10	Marina Utkina (RUS)		+ 2' 39"

=== Stage 4 ===
25 May 2014 — Tulskiy to Partizanskaya Polyana, 84.7 km (52.6 mi)

Stage 4 Result

	Rider	Team	Time
1	Anna Zavershinskaya (RUS)		2h 50' 45"
2	Natalia Boyarskaya (RUS)	Servetto Footon	s.t.
3	Tatiana Shamanova (RUS)		s.t.
4	Marina Likhanova (RUS)	Servetto Footon	+ 1' 26"
5	Ekaterina Malomoura (RUS)		+ 1' 42"
6	Anna Evseeva (RUS)		+ 1' 44"
7	Anastasia Iakovenko (RUS)	Bizkaia–Durango	+ 2' 17"
8	Galina Chernyshova (RUS)		+ 2' 48"
9	Ksenia Tuhai (BLR)		+ 2' 48"
10	Kristina Mashtalerova (RUS)		+ 3' 02"

Final General Classification

	Rider	Team	Time
1	Natalia Boyarskaya (RUS)	Servetto Footon	9h 21' 56"
2	Anna Zavershinskaya (RUS)		+ 1' 13"
3	Tatiana Shamanova (RUS)		+ 1' 49"
4	Marina Likhanova (RUS)	Servetto Footon	+ 3' 22"
5	Anna Evseeva (RUS)		+ 3' 38"
6	Ekaterina Malomoura (RUS)		+ 4' 13"
7	Aušrinė Trebaitė (LTU)		+ 4' 42"
8	Ksenia Tuhai (BLR)		+ 5' 49"
9	Kristina Mashtalerova (RUS)		+ 5' 51"
10	Anastasia Iakovenko (RUS)		+ 6' 04"

== Classification leadership table ==
Stage	Winner	General classification	Points classification	Mountains classification	Teams classification
1	Natalia Boyarskaya	Natalia Boyarskaya	Natalia Boyarskaya	Not awarded	Servetto Footon
2	Natalia Boyarskaya	Natalia Boyarskaya	Natalia Boyarskaya	Anna Zavershinskaya	Servetto Footon
3	Tereza Trefná	Natalia Boyarskaya	Natalia Boyarskaya	Anna Zavershinskaya	Servetto Footon
4	Anna Zavershinskaya	Natalia Boyarskaya	Natalia Boyarskaya	Anna Zavershinskaya	Russia (national team)
Final		Natalia Boyarskaya	Natalia Boyarskaya	Anna Zavershinskaya	Russia (national team)
