= Anna Potokina =

Russian cyclist

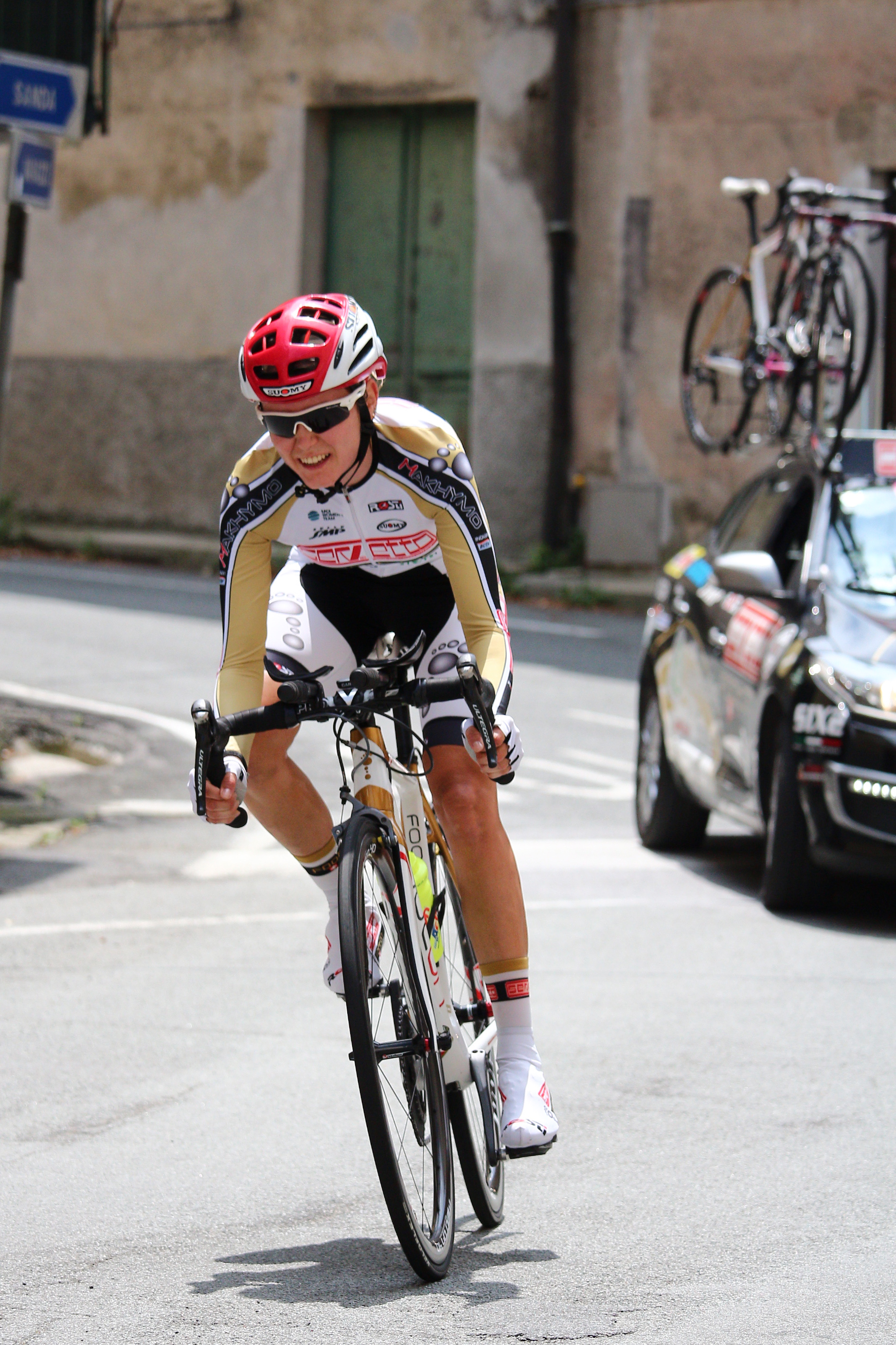
- Potokina during the 2016 Giro d'Italia Femminile

Personal information
- Full name: Anna Potokina; Анна Потокина
- Born: 18 June 1987 (age 39)

Cycling career
- Sport: Cycling
- Discipline: Road
- Role: Rider

Professional teams
- 2012–2013: Lointek
- 2014–2016: Servetto Footon
- 2017: Servetto Giusta
- 2018: Servetto–Stradalli Cycle–Alurecycling
- 2019–2020: Servetto–Piumate–Beltrami TSA
- 2021–2022: Servetto–Makhymo–Beltrami TSA

Anna Potokina (Анна Потокина; born 18 June 1987) is a Russian professional racing cyclist, who rode for UCI Women's Continental Team Servetto–Makhymo–Beltrami TSA.

== Major results ==
2011
10th Overall Tour de Bretagne Féminin

1st Stage 4

2012
2nd Road race, National Road Championships
10th Overall Tour of Adygeya
2013
6th Overall Vuelta Internacional Femenina a Costa Rica
2015
1st Road race, National Road Championships
7th Overall Tour Cycliste Féminin International de l'Ardèche
8th Overall Tour of Adygeya
8th Grand Prix of Maykop
8th Giro del Trentino Alto Adige-Südtirol
2016
9th Overall Giro del Trentino Alto Adige-Südtirol
2017
5th Ljubljana–Domžale–Ljubljana TT
2018
2nd Road race, National Road Championships
4th Overall Tour of Zhoushan Island
2019
3rd Road race, National Road Championships

== See also ==
- List of 2015 UCI Women's Teams and riders
