= 2016 European Road Championships – Women's time trial =

Women's time trial
2016 European Road Championships
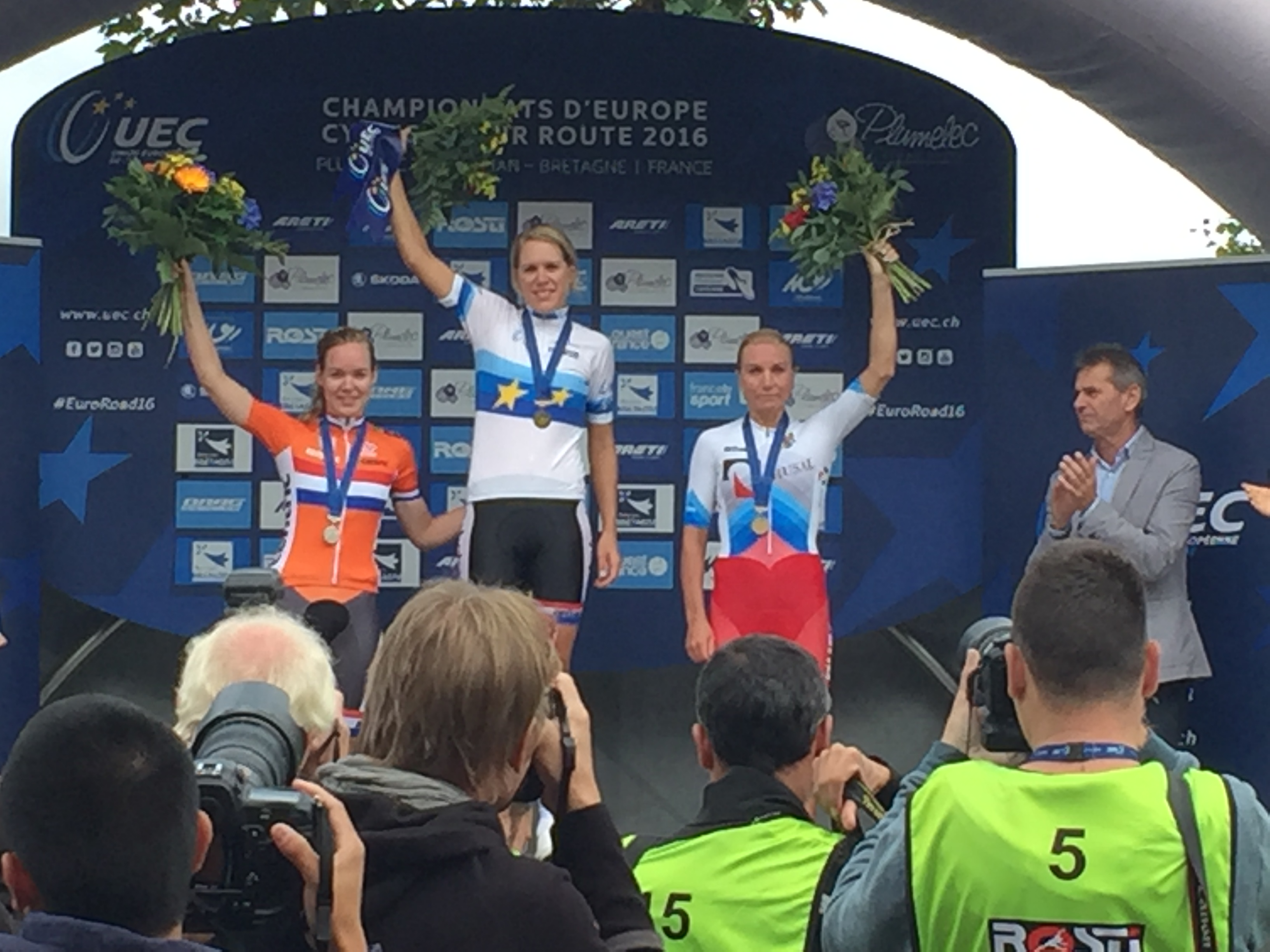
- The podium of the event (from left to right): Anna van der Breggen, Ellen van Dijk and Olga Zabelinskaya

Race details
- Dates: 15 September 2016; Plumelec, France
- Stages: 1
- Distance: 25.40 km (15.78 mi)
- Winning time: 36' 41.07"

Results
	Winner	Ellen van Dijk (NED)
	Second	Anna van der Breggen (NED)
	Third	Olga Zabelinskaya (RUS)

Women's under-23 classification
European Road Championships – Women's under-23 time trial
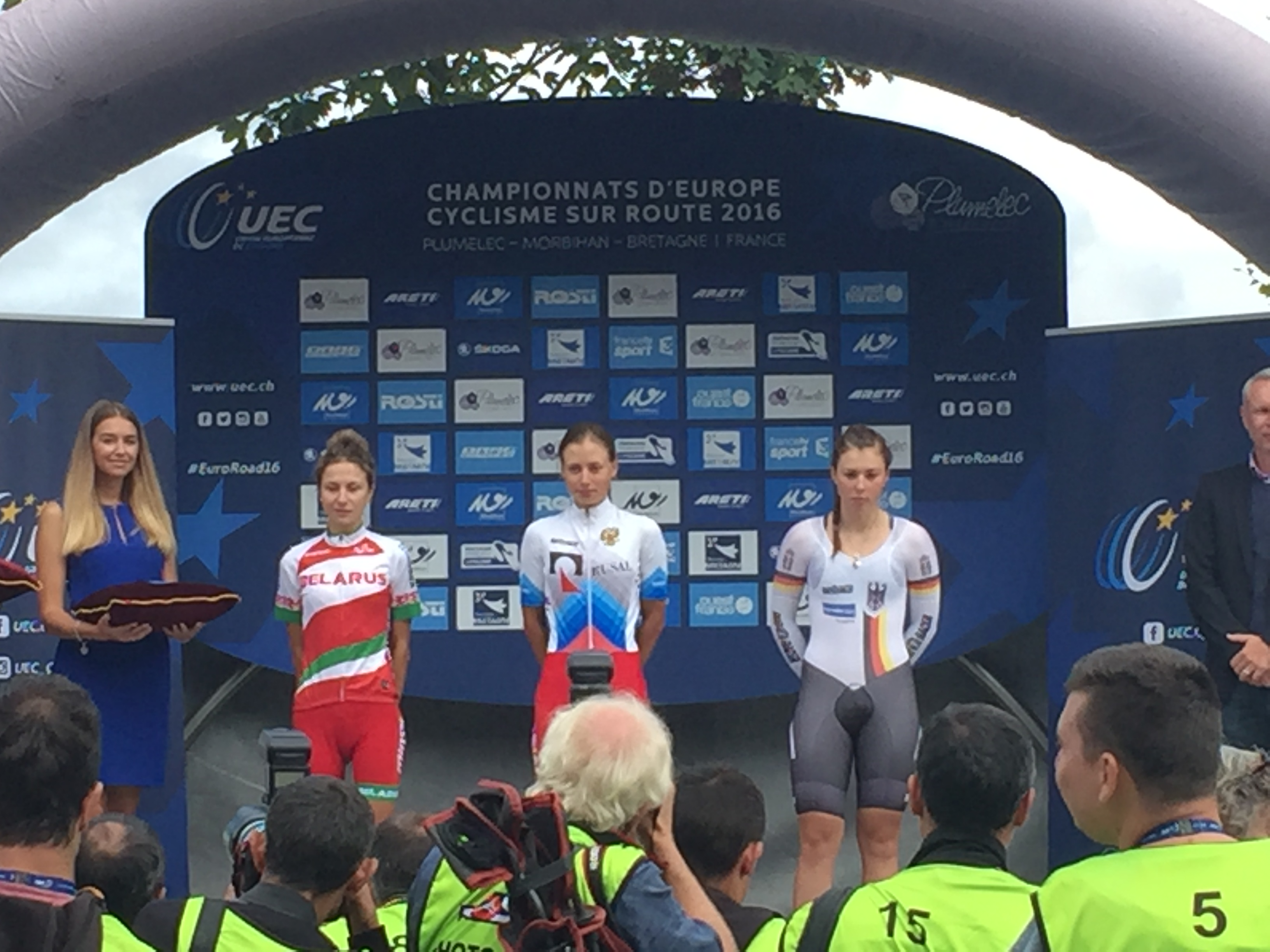
- Podium of the under-23 classification (from left to right): Ksenyia Tuhai, Anastasiia Iakovenko and Lisa Klein

Race details
- Stages: 1
- Winning time: 39' 35.87"

Results
	Winner	Anastasiia Iakovenko (RUS)
	Second	Ksenyia Tuhai (BLR)
	Third	Lisa Klein (GER)

The Women's time trial at the 2016 European Road Championships took place on 15 September. It was the first time that an elite time trial event for women was contested at the European Road Championships. The start of the time trial was in Josselin, with the finish at the top of the Côte de Cadoudal, in Plumelec; in total, the course was 25.4 km (15.8 mi) in length. The event also saw riders under the age of 23 take part, with separated rankings and the UEC European Champion jersey on offer to the fastest rider. In total, 52 riders contested the event.

The elite title was won by Dutch rider Ellen van Dijk, completing the course in a time of 36 minutes, 41.07 seconds. Van Dijk finished 18.40 seconds ahead of her compatriot Anna van der Breggen, with Russia's Olga Zabelinskaya completing the podium, a further 4.99 seconds in arrears of van der Breggen.

In the concurrent under-23 race, Russia's Anastasiia Iakovenko claimed the title in a time of 39 minutes, 35.87 seconds. Second place went to Ksenyia Tuhai of Belarus, 9.62 seconds in arrears of Iakovenko, while the bronze medal was taken by Germany's Lisa Klein, 1.99 seconds behind Tuhai.

== Course ==
The race start was held on the Rue du Canal in Josselin. The finish was at the top of the Côte de Cadoudal, a 1.8 km (1.1 mi), 7.8% average gradient hill in Plumelec.

== Preview ==
It was the first time that an elite time trial event was organised at the European Road Championships, although there had been a time trial competition held exclusively for riders under 23 years of age since 1997. Of those competing in Plumelec, five riders had previously won the European under-23 championship; Olga Zabelinskaya (2002), Ellen van Dijk (2007 and 2008), Anna van der Breggen (2012), Hanna Solovey (2013) and Mieke Kröger (2014). The inaugural edition of the European Games, held in 2015, also included an individual time trial, won by van Dijk ahead of Solovey. Previous UCI Road World Championships medallists that participated at the championships were 2013 gold medal winner van Dijk, as well as previous silver medallists Solovey (2014) and van der Breggen (2015).

On the 2016 women's road cycling calendar there were only a few international individual time trial event. The most important one was the time trial at the 2016 Summer Olympics. Behind gold medal winner Kristin Armstrong from the United States, Zabelinskaya finished the 29.8 km (18.5 mi)-long course with the silver medal, six seconds ahead of van der Breggen, with van Dijk in fourth after going off-course during her race. A week before the European Championships, the annual Chrono Champenois was held in the French commune of Bétheny. Over the 33.4 km (20.8 mi) course, Zabelinskaya finished five seconds ahead of van Dijk; however, both riders were beaten by Australia's Katrin Garfoot.

== Race report ==
Despite predicted rain for race day it was dry during the time trial. The time trial started at 10:30 with the Ukrainian rider Olga Shekel first to set off onto the course, setting a time of 39 minutes, 49.88 seconds. The fifth rider to set off, Anastasiia Iakovenko then set the fastest time at 39' 35", a time that was ultimately good enough for her to win the under-23 race. Later the French rider Edwige Pitel went quicker with a new fastest time of 39' 13". At the intermediate time point after 14.5 km (9.0 mi), Azerbaijan's Olena Pavlukhina went 22 seconds faster than Pitel (22' 22") before French team-mate Audrey Cordon became the first rider to go below 22 minutes to the intermediate point. When Pavlukhina finished she was the new leader with a time of 39' 12", but was later beaten by Cordon in 38' 29".

Meanwhile Ellen van Dijk had set the fastest intermediate time by over a minute with a time of 20' 59", before recording the fastest time at the finish of 36' 41". Olga Zabelinskaya, with an intermediate time of 21' 19", was not able to beat the time of van Dijk and finished in a time of 37' 04"; a time ultimately good enough for the bronze medal. Finally Anna van der Breggen, who was 5 seconds slower than van Dijk at the intermediate time point, was also not able to improve, finishing 18 seconds in arrears of her compatriot, with the silver medal.

== Post-race reactions ==
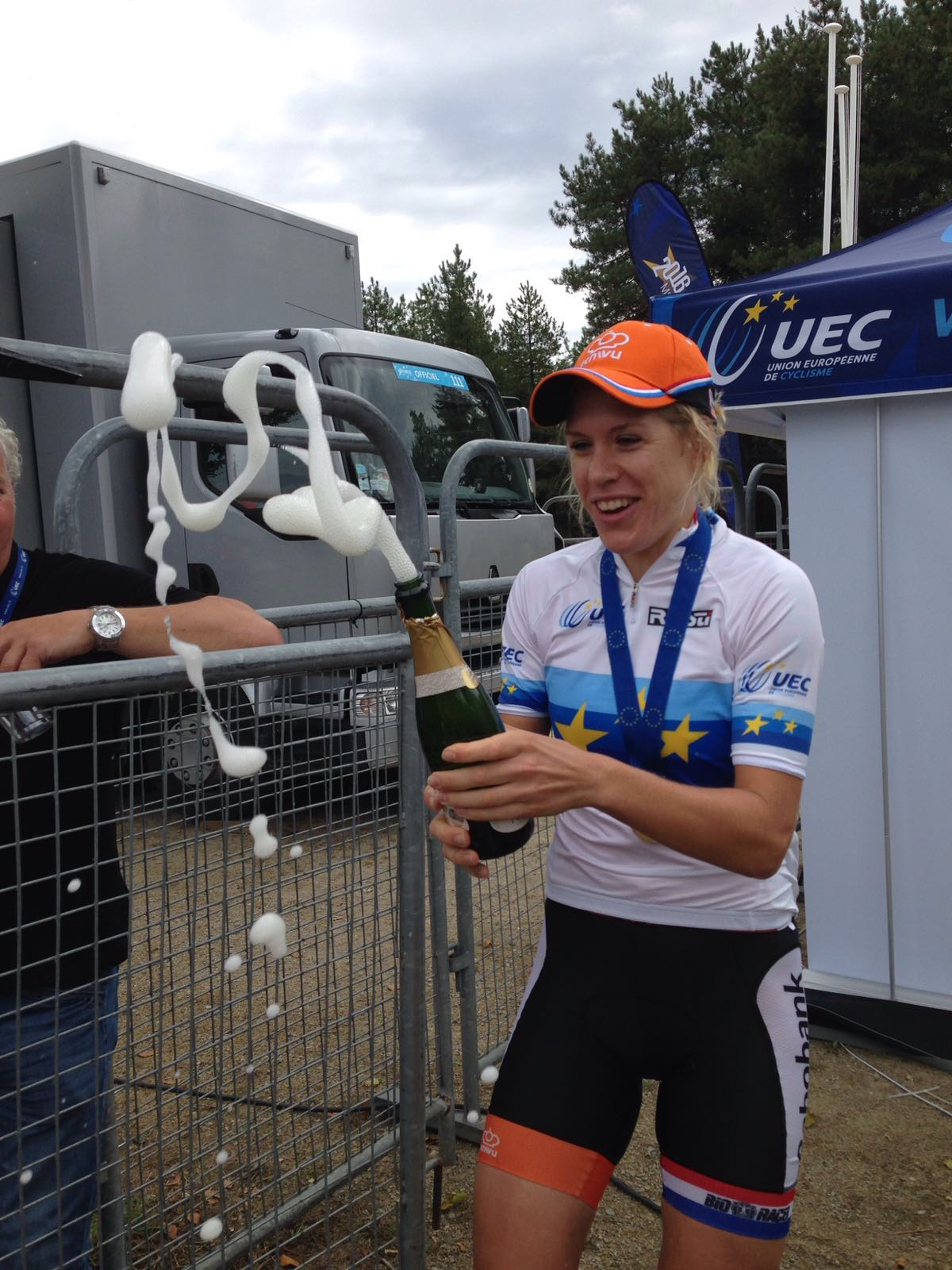
Ellen van Dijk celebrating her victory

After winning the gold medal, van Dijk explained that she had been unwell in the run-up to the championships, but elected to compete after consultations with her doctor. Van Dijk stated that she was "happy" to win overall, and found the result to be "a boost towards the World Championships in Qatar".

With van Dijk having already qualified for October's UCI Road World Championships in Qatar, an additional place was awarded for winning the European championships, and as a result, Annemiek van Vleuten was selected to also compete for the Netherlands.

== Final classification ==
Rank		Rider	Time
Ov.	U23	Rider	Time
1	—N/a	Ellen van Dijk (NED)	36' 41.07"
2	—N/a	Anna van der Breggen (NED)	+ 18.40"
3	—N/a	Olga Zabelinskaya (RUS)	+ 23.39"
4	—N/a	Alena Amialiusik (BLR)	+ 1' 31.92"
5	—N/a	Audrey Cordon (FRA)	+ 1' 48.91"
6	—N/a	Ann-Sophie Duyck (BEL)	+ 1' 50.48"
7	—N/a	Elisa Longo Borghini (ITA)	+ 1' 55.37"
8	—N/a	Katarzyna Pawłowska (POL)	+ 2' 25.31"
9	—N/a	Olena Pavlukhina (AZE)	+ 2' 31.43"
10	—N/a	Edwige Pitel (FRA)	+ 2' 32.72"
11	1	Anastasiia Iakovenko (RUS)	+ 2' 54.80"
12	—N/a	Doris Schweizer (SUI)	+ 2' 57.24"
13	2	Ksenyia Tuhai (BLR)	+ 3' 04.42"
14	3	Lisa Klein (DEU)	+ 3' 06.41"
15	4	Riejanne Markus (NED)	+ 3' 07.57"
16	5	Olga Shekel (UKR)	+ 3' 08.81"
17	—N/a	Mieke Kröger (DEU)	+ 3' 10.29"
18	6	Cecilie Uttrup Ludwig (DNK)	+ 3' 16.70"
19	—N/a	Jutta Stienen (SUI)	+ 3' 19.56"
20	7	Corinna Lechner (DEU)	+ 3' 22.76"
21	8	Katrine Aalerud (NOR)	+ 3' 24.34"
22	—N/a	Camilla Møllebro (DNK)	+ 3' 31.93"
23	9	Séverine Eraud (FRA)	+ 3' 37.11"
24	—N/a	Anna Turvey (IRL)	+ 3' 43.99"
25	—N/a	Martina Ritter (AUT)	+ 3' 44.38"
26	10	Alicja Ratajczak (POL)	+ 3' 44.78"
27	11	Aafke Soet (NED)	+ 3' 48.18"
28	—N/a	Emilia Fahlin (SWE)	+ 3' 49.03"
29	—N/a	Valeriya Kononenko (UKR)	+ 4' 01.53"
30	12	Annabelle Dreville (FRA)	+ 4' 01.85"
31	—N/a	Silvija Latožaitė (LTU)	+ 4' 04.04"
32	13	Nikol Płosaj (POL)	+ 4' 06.06"
33	—N/a	Julie Leth (DNK)	+ 4' 06.38"
34	14	Alice Barnes (GBR)	+ 4' 06.96"
35	15	Sheyla Gutiérrez (ESP)	+ 4' 15.08"
36	—N/a	Jarmila Machačová (CZE)	+ 4' 24.10"
37	16	Aline Seitz (SUI)	+ 4' 27.31"
38	17	Sofia Bertizzolo (ITA)	+ 4' 27.54"
39	—N/a	Hanna Solovey (UKR)	+ 4' 32.92"
40	—N/a	Sari Saarelainen (FIN)	+ 4' 34.82"
41	18	Svetlana Vasilieva (RUS)	+ 4' 37.49"
42	19	Abby-Mae Parkinson (GBR)	+ 4' 39.52"
43	—N/a	Lija Laizāne (LAT)	+ 4' 40.93"
44	20	Christina Siggaard (DNK)	+ 4' 46.72"
45	21	Viktoriia Aliekseieva (UKR)	+ 5' 17.16"
46	22	Tereza Medveďová (SVK)	+ 5' 17.87"
47	—N/a	Isabelle Beckers (BEL)	+ 5' 20.52"
48	—N/a	Romy Kasper (DEU)	+ 5' 52.52"
49	23	Antonia Gröndahl (FIN)	+ 5' 56.04"
50	24	Lucia Valachová (SVK)	+ 6' 17.64"
51	25	Josie Knight (IRL)	+ 6' 38.18"
52	26	Cansu Türkmenoğlu (TUR)	+ 11' 09.82"
