= Aljeraiwi =

Aljeraiwi is a surname. Notable people with the surname include:

- Nada Aljeraiwi (born 1985), Kuwaiti cyclist
- Najla Aljeraiwi (born 1988), Kuwaiti cyclist, sister of Nada
