= 2016 UCI Road World Championships – Women's road race =

Cycling race

Women's road race
2016 UCI Road World Championships
- Rainbow jersey

Race details
- Dates: 15 October 2016
- Stages: 1 in Doha, Qatar
- Distance: 134.1 km (83.3 mi)
- Winning time: 3h 10' 27"

Medalists
	Gold	(Denmark) Amalie Dideriksen (DEN)
	Silver	(Netherlands) Kirsten Wild (NED)
	Bronze	(Finland) Lotta Lepistö (FIN)

The Women's road race of the 2016 UCI Road World Championships took place in and around Doha, Qatar on 15 October 2016. The course of the race was 134.1 km (83.3 mi) with the start and finish in Doha. Lizzie Deignan was the defending champion, having won the world title in 2015. Deignan was unable to defend her title, as she finished fourth in the bunch sprint finish.

The gold medal and rainbow jersey went to 20-year-old Danish rider Amalie Dideriksen, who became the youngest rider in a decade to win the title, and only the fifth rider to win both the junior and elite world titles, having won the junior title in 2013 and 2014. She finished ahead of Kirsten Wild of the Netherlands, while the bronze medal went to Finland's Lotta Lepistö.

== Course ==
The race started at the Qatar Foundation in Education City before the race made its way towards The Pearl Island, with 27.7 kilometres (17.2 miles) being completed before the first passage of the finish line. Thereafter, seven laps of 15.2 kilometres (9.4 miles) were completed before the race's conclusion.

== Schedule ==
All times are in Arabia Standard Time (UTC+03:00).

Date	Time	Event
15 October 2016	12:45–16:20	Women's road race

== Participating nations ==
146 cyclists from 46 nations were entered in the women's road race, with 142 riders taking the start. The numbers of cyclists per nation are shown in parentheses.

- Australia (7)
- Austria (2)
- Azerbaijan (1)
- Belarus (1)
- Belgium (6)
- Canada (6)
- China (2)
- Chinese Taipei (1)
- Colombia (1)
- Croatia (1)
- Czech Republic (2)
- Denmark (3)
- Egypt (1)
- Eritrea (3)
- Estonia (1)
- Ethiopia (3)
- Finland (4)
- France (6)
- Germany (6)
- Great Britain (8)
- Greece (1)
- Guatemala (1)
- Hong Kong (2)
- Israel (2)
- Italy (7)
- Japan (3)
- Kazakhstan (2)
- Kuwait (3)
- Lithuania (2)
- Luxembourg (3)
- Mexico (2)
- Netherlands (8)
- Norway (3)
- Poland (6)
- Russia (5)
- Rwanda (1)
- Serbia (1)
- Slovenia (2)
- South Africa (6)
- Spain (3)
- Sweden (5)
- Switzerland (1)
- Thailand (1)
- Ukraine (3)
- United States (7)
- Vietnam (1)

== Final classification ==
Of the race's 146 entrants, 103 riders completed the full distance of 134.1 kilometres (83.3 mi).

Rank	Rider	Country	Time
1	Amalie Dideriksen	Denmark	3h 10' 27"
2	Kirsten Wild	Netherlands	+ 0"
3	Lotta Lepistö	Finland	+ 0"
4	Lizzie Deignan	United Kingdom	+ 0"
5	Marta Bastianelli	Italy	+ 0"
6	Roxane Fournier	France	+ 0"
7	Chloe Hosking	Australia	+ 0"
8	Sheyla Gutiérrez	Spain	+ 0"
9	Joëlle Numainville	Canada	+ 0"
10	Jolien D'Hoore	Belgium	+ 0"
11	Emilie Moberg	Norway	+ 0"
12	Lisa Brennauer	Germany	+ 0"
13	Katarzyna Pawłowska	Poland	+ 0"
14	Leah Kirchmann	Canada	+ 0"
15	Christine Majerus	Luxembourg	+ 0"
16	Coryn Rivera	United States	+ 0"
17	Sara Mustonen	Sweden	+ 0"
18	Mia Radotić	Croatia	+ 0"
19	Rasa Leleivytė	Lithuania	+ 0"
20	Barbara Guarischi	Italy	+ 4"
21	Miho Yoshikawa	Japan	+ 4"
22	Marianne Vos	Netherlands	+ 4"
23	Alison Jackson	Canada	+ 4"
24	Jelena Erić	Serbia	+ 4"
25	Barbora Průdková	Czech Republic	+ 4"
26	Ashleigh Moolman	South Africa	+ 4"
27	Megan Guarnier	United States	+ 4"
28	Christina Perchtold	Austria	+ 4"
29	Carmen Small	United States	+ 4"
30	Alexis Ryan	United States	+ 4"
31	Eugenia Bujak	Poland	+ 4"
32	Amy Pieters	Netherlands	+ 4"
33	Polona Batagelj	Slovenia	+ 4"
34	Alena Amialiusik	Belarus	+ 4"
35	Katarzyna Niewiadoma	Poland	+ 4"
36	Maria Giulia Confalonieri	Italy	+ 10"
37	Aude Biannic	France	+ 12"
38	Nicolle Bruderer	Guatemala	+ 12"
39	Katrine Aalerud	Norway	+ 12"
40	Olena Pavlukhina	Azerbaijan	+ 12"
41	Samantha Sanders	South Africa	+ 12"
42	Diana Peñuela	Colombia	+ 12"
43	Hanna Solovey	Ukraine	+ 12"
44	Yusseli Mendivil	Mexico	+ 12"
45	Urša Pintar	Slovenia	+ 12"
46	Alice Barnes	United Kingdom	+ 12"
47	Julie Leth	Denmark	+ 12"
48	Tiffany Cromwell	Australia	+ 12"
49	Emma Johansson	Sweden	+ 12"
50	Chantal Blaak	Netherlands	+ 12"
51	Katrin Garfoot	Australia	+ 12"
52	Stephanie Pohl	Germany	+ 12"
53	Annemiek van Vleuten	Netherlands	+ 12"
54	Natalya Saifutdinova	Kazakhstan	+ 16"
55	Sara Penton	Sweden	+ 18"
56	Dani King	United Kingdom	+ 18"
57	Eileen Roe	United Kingdom	+ 18"
58	Heidi Dalton	South Africa	+ 18"
59	Cecilie Gotaas Johnsen	Norway	+ 18"
60	Huang Ting-ying	Chinese Taipei	+ 18"
61	Emilia Fahlin	Sweden	+ 18"
62	Cecilie Uttrup Ludwig	Denmark	+ 18"
63	Sarah Rijkes	Austria	+ 18"
64	Yumi Kajihara	Japan	+ 18"
65	Alicia González Blanco	Spain	+ 18"
66	Kaat Van der Meulen	Belgium	+ 18"
67	Chantal Hoffmann	Luxembourg	+ 18"
68	Valerie Demey	Belgium	+ 18"
69	Lauren Kitchen	Australia	+ 22"
70	Romy Kasper	Germany	+ 22"
71	Karol-Ann Canuel	Canada	+ 22"
72	Mieke Kröger	Germany	+ 22"
73	Trixi Worrack	Germany	+ 27"
74	Tatiana Guderzo	Italy	+ 27"
75	Lotte Kopecky	Belgium	+ 30"
76	Hannah Barnes	United Kingdom	+ 39"
77	Olga Shekel	Ukraine	+ 39"
78	Rosa Törmänen	Finland	+ 39"
79	Abby-Mae Parkinson	United Kingdom	+ 39"
80	Lisa Klein	Germany	+ 39"
81	Elise Maes	Luxembourg	+ 39"
82	Annasley Park	United Kingdom	+ 42"
83	Lauren Stephens	United States	+ 42"
84	Anna Plichta	Poland	+ 42"
85	Ellen van Dijk	Netherlands	+ 45"
86	Eri Yonamine	Japan	+ 45"
87	Anna van der Breggen	Netherlands	+ 1' 00"
88	Audrey Cordon	France	+ 1' 00"
89	Elisa Longo Borghini	Italy	+ 1' 00"
90	Elena Cecchini	Italy	+ 1' 00"
91	Sara Bergen	Canada	+ 1' 00"
92	Gracie Elvin	Australia	+ 1' 00"
93	Roxane Knetemann	Netherlands	+ 1' 43"
94	Sofie De Vuyst	Belgium	+ 1' 43"
95	Anisha Vekemans	Belgium	+ 2' 30"
96	Wahazit Kidane	Eritrea	+ 3' 42"
97	Meng Zhaojuan	Hong Kong	+ 3' 42"
98	Amber Neben	United States	+ 6' 46"
99	Sarah Roy	Australia	+ 6' 46"
100	Eugénie Duval	France	+ 6' 46"
101	Nicole Hanselmann	Switzerland	+ 10' 31"
102	Alba Teruel Ribes	Spain	+ 10' 31"
103	Paz Bash	Israel	+ 11' 48"

Rank	Rider	Country	Time
	Annie Foreman-Mackey	Canada	DNF
	Loren Rowney	Australia	DNF
	Rotem Gafinovitz	Israel	DNF
	Alexandra Nessmar	Sweden	DNF
	Varvara Fasoi	Greece	DNF
	Allie Dragoo	United States	DNF
	Marta Lach	Poland	DNF
	Laura Vainionpää	Finland	DNF
	Alexandra Chekina	Russia	DNF
	Guo Hong	China	DNF
	Phetdarin Somrat	Thailand	DNF
	Anriette Schoeman	South Africa	DNF
	Nguyễn Thị Thật	Vietnam	DNF
	Coralie Demay	France	DNF
	Laura Massey	United Kingdom	DNF
	Valeriya Kononenko	Ukraine	DNF
	Nikola Nosková	Czech Republic	DNF
	Anastasiia Iakovenko	Russia	DNF
	Svetlana Vasilieva	Russia	DNF
	Pascale Jeuland	France	DNF
	Margarita Syrodoeva	Russia	DNF
	Antonia Gröndahl	Finland	DNF
	Makhabbat Umutzhanova	Kazakhstan	DNF
	Wogahta Gebrehiwet	Eritrea	DNF
	Ebtissam Mohamed	Egypt	DNF
	Mossana Debesai	Eritrea	DNF
	Sofía Arreola	Mexico	DNF
	Silvija Latožaitė	Lithuania	DNF
	Kelly Kalm	Estonia	DNF
	Alicja Ratajczak	Poland	DNF
	Eden Bekele	Ethiopia	DNF
	Carla Oberholzer	South Africa	DNF
	Tsega Gebre Beyene	Ethiopia	DNF
	Najla Aljeraiwi	Kuwait	DNF
	Zanele Tshoko	South Africa	DNF
	Sun Jiajun	China	DNF
	Noura Alameeri	Kuwait	DNF
	Nada Aljeraiwi	Kuwait	DNF
	Olga Zabelinskaya	Russia	DSQ
	Giorgia Bronzini	Italy	DNS
	Yang Qianyu	Hong Kong	DNS
	Beatha Ingabire	Rwanda	DNS
	Eyeru Tesfoam	Ethiopia	DNS
