= 2014 Grand Prix of Maykop =

Race details
- Dates: 20 May 2014
- Stages: 1
- Distance: 98.6 km (61.3 mi)

The 2014 Grand Prix of Maykop was a one-day women's cycle race held in Russia on 20 May 2014. The race had a UCI rating of 1.2.

== Results ==
	Rider	Team	Time
1	Yulia Ilyinykh (RUS)	Bizkaia–Durango	2h 30' 39"
2	Anastasia Chulkova (RUS)	RusVelo	s.t.
3	Elena Utrobina (RUS)		s.t.
4	Larisa Pankova (RUS)		s.t.
5	Alexandra Chekina (RUS)		s.t.
6	Kseniya Dobrynina (RUS)	Astana BePink	s.t.
7	Yulia Blindyuk (RUS)	RusVelo	s.t.
8	Elena Gogoleva (RUS)		s.t.
9	Olga Dobrynina (RUS)		s.t.
10	Irina Molicheva (RUS)		s.t.

== See also ==
- 2014 in women's road cycling
