= Anastasia Chulkova =

Russian cyclist (born 1985)

Anastasia Chulkova (Анастасия Александровна Чулкова)
Personal information
- Born: 7 March 1985 (age 41)

Cycling career
- Sport: Cycling
- Discipline: Racing
- Role: Road
Medal record
Women's track cycling
Representing Russia
World Championships
Gold medal – first place	2012 Melbourne	Points race
European Track Championships
Bronze medal – third place	2008 Pruszków	omnium

Anastasia Aleksandrovna Chulkova (Russian: Анастасия Александровна Чулкова; born 7 March 1985) is a Russian professional racing cyclist.

== Major results ==
=== Track ===
2002
3rd Keirin, UCI Junior Track Cycling World Championships
2003
UEC European Junior Track Championships

1st Points race
3rd 500m time trial

3rd Sprint, UCI Junior Track Cycling World Championships
2004
3rd Team sprint, 2004 UCI Track Cycling World Cup Classics, Sydney (with Oksana Grishina)
2005
3rd Keirin, UEC European Under-23 Track Championships
2006
2nd Sprint, UEC European Under-23 Track Championships
2007
2007–08 UCI Track Cycling World Cup Classics

1st Team pursuit, Sydney
2nd Team pursuit, Beijing
3rd Scratch, Sydney

3rd Points race, UEC European Under-23 Track Championships
2008
2007–08 UCI Track Cycling World Cup Classics

2nd Team pursuit, Los Angeles
3rd Scratch, Copenhagen

3rd Omnium, UEC European Track Championships
2011
1st Scratch, 2010–11 UCI Track Cycling World Cup Classics, Manchester
2nd Points race, Summer Universiade
2012
1st Points race, UCI Track Cycling World Championships
2013
2nd Points race, Revolution – Round 1, Manchester
2014
3rd Points race, Memorial of Alexander Lesnikov
2017
2nd Points race, Grand Prix of Moscow
2019
2nd Scratch, 2019–20 UCI Track Cycling World Cup, Glasgow
3rd Points race, Grand Prix of Moscow
3rd Omnium, Grand Prix of Saint Petersburg

=== Road ===
2012
1st Grand Prix of Maykop
10th Omloop van Borsele
2013
1st Stage 3 Tour of Adygeya
1st Stage 3 Trophée d'Or Féminin
2nd Grand Prix of Maykop
2014
2nd Grand Prix of Maykop
2015
6th Overall Tour of Zhoushan Island

1st Mountains classification
1st Stage 3

7th Overall Tour de Bretagne Féminin
10th Grand Prix of Maykop
