= Larisa Pankova =

Russian cyclist

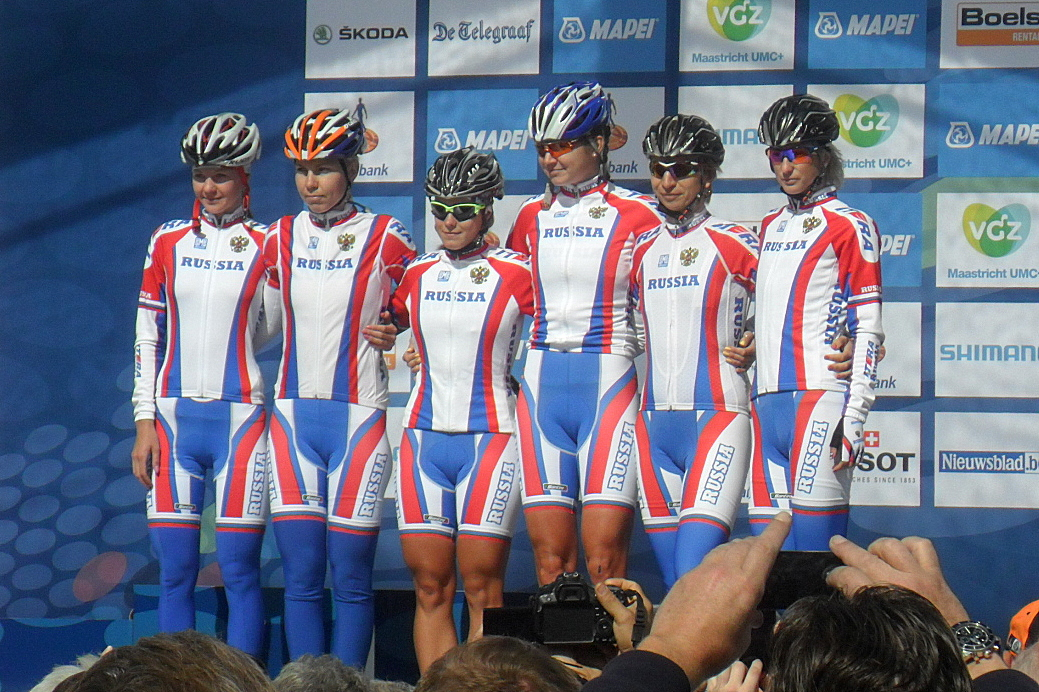
- Pankova at the 2012 UCI Road World Championships.

Personal information
- Full name: Larisa Olegovna Pankova
- Born: 12 May 1991 (age 35) Semey, Russia
- Height: 1.76 m (5 ft 9 in)
- Weight: 52 kg (115 lb)

Cycling career
- Sport: Cycling
- Current team: Retired
- Discipline: Road
- Role: Rider

Professional teams
- 2012–2013: RusVelo
- 2015: Astana–Acca Due O

Larisa Olegovna Pankova (Russian: Лариса Олеговна Панкова; born 12 May 1991) is a Russian former road bicycle racer. She competed at the 2012 Summer Olympics in the Women's road race, finishing 38th. In 2012, she won the Tour de Feminin-O cenu Českého Švýcarska. During her career, she raced for Rusvelo and Astana - Acca Due O. She also finished second in the Russian National Road Race Championships in 2011, following on from a third place in 2010. She competed in the Women's Road Race World Championships in 2012.

== Major results ==
2008
7th Road race, UCI Junior Road World Championships
2009
4th Road race, UCI Junior Road World Championships
8th Overall Tour Feminin-O Cenu Ceskeho Svycarska
2010
3rd Road race, National Road Championships
7th Time trial, UEC European Under-23 Road Championships
9th Overall Tour Feminin-O Cenu Ceskeho Svycarska
2011
UEC European Under-23 Road Championships

1st Road race
2nd Time trial

2nd Road race, National Road Championships
3rd Overall Tour Feminin-O Cenu Ceskeho Svycarska
6th Overall Gracia-Orlová

1st Stage 3

2012
1st Overall Tour Feminin-O Cenu Ceskeho Svycarska

1st Mountains classification
1st Points classification
1st Young rider classification
1st Stage 1, 3 & 4

4th Grand Prix of Maykop
4th Time trial, National Road Championships
6th Overall Tour of Adygeya
7th Overall Tour Féminin en Limousin
2014
4th Grand Prix of Maykop
4th Time trial, National Road Championships
