= Galina Chernyshova =

Russian cyclist

Personal information
- Full name: Galina Chernyshova
- Born: 21 November 1993 (age 32) Russia

Cycling career
- Sport: Cycling
- Current team: Sestroretsk
- Discipline: Road
- Role: Rider

Amateur teams
- 2017–2019: Petrogradets
- 2022–: Sestroretsk

Professional team
- 2020–2021: Sestroretsk

Galina Chernyshova (born 21 November 1993) is a Russian road cyclist, who currently rides for Russian amateur team Sestroretsk.

== Major results ==
2015
3rd Grand Prix of Maykop
2019
7th Pannonhalma, V4 Ladies Series
2020
3rd Grand Prix Gazipaşa
9th Grand Prix World's Best High Altitude
9th Grand Prix Central Anatolia
