= Shamanov =

Shamanov (Russian: Шаманов) is a Russian masculine surname originating from the noun shaman; its feminine counterpart is Shamanova. The surname may refer to:

- Boris Shamanov (1931–2008), Russian painter
- Nina Shamanova (1937–2021), Soviet rower
- Tatiana Shamanova (born 1992), Russian cyclist
- Vladimir Shamanov (born 1957), Russian general
