= Grand Prix Gazipaşa =

Grand Prix Gazipaşa is the name of two cycling races:

- Grand Prix Gazipaşa (men's race)
- Grand Prix Gazipaşa (women's race)
