= Margarita Syradoeva =

Russian cyclist

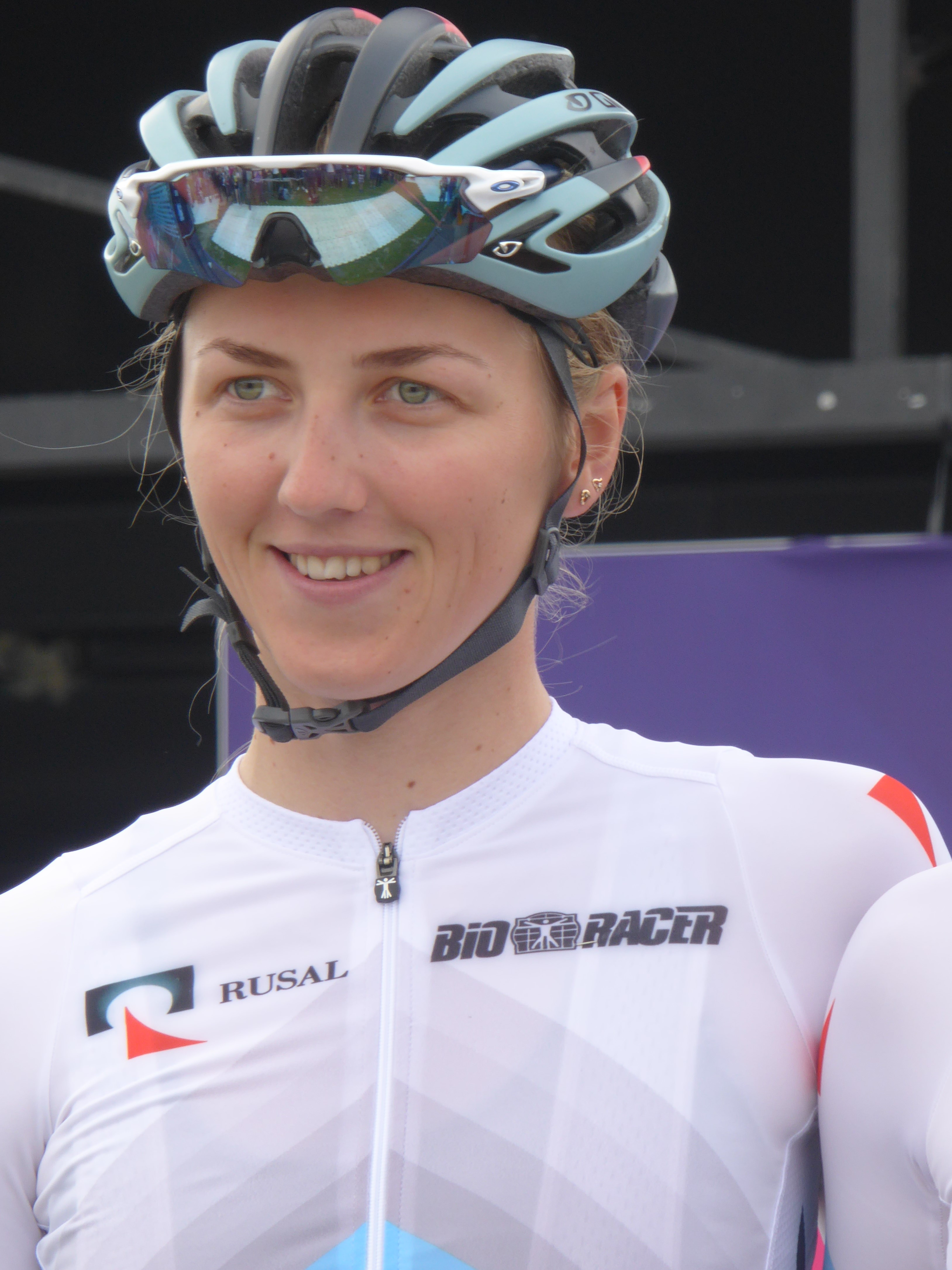
- Syradoeva at the 2018 European Road Cycling Championships.

Personal information
- Full name: Margarita Syradoeva
- Born: 6 April 1995 (age 31) Velikiye Luki, Russia

Cycling career
- Sport: Cycling
- Current team: Sestroretsk
- Discipline: Road
- Role: Rider

Amateur team
- 2018–2019: Sestroretsk–Petrogradets

Professional teams
- 2017: Bepink–Cogeas
- 2020–: Sestroretsk

Margarita Syradoeva (born 6 April 1995) is a Russian professional racing cyclist, who currently rides for UCI Women's Continental Team Sestroretsk. She rode in the women's road race at the 2016 UCI Road World Championships, but she did not finish the race.
