= Utrobin =

Utrobin or Utrobina is a surname. Notable people with the surname include:

- Ivan Utrobin (1934–2020), Russian cross-country skier
- Elena Utrobina (born 1985), Russian cyclist
