= Elena Utrobina =

Russian cyclist

Personal information
- Born: 1 January 1985 (age 41)

Cycling career
- Sport: Cycling
- Current team: Retired
- Discipline: Road
- Role: Rider

Professional teams
- 2012: Faren–Honda Team
- 2013: Lointek
- 2015: Bizkaia–Durango
- 2016: Hagens Berman–Supermint

Elena Utrobina (born 1 January 1985) is a Russian former professional racing cyclist.

== Major results ==
2012
7th Grand Prix of Maykop
2014
3rd Grand Prix of Maykop
2015
1st Stage 2 Tour of Adygeya
9th Grand Prix of Maykop

== See also ==
- List of 2016 UCI Women's Teams and riders
