= Marina Likhanova =

Russian cyclist

Personal information
- Born: 27 October 1990 (age 35)

Cycling career
- Sport: Cycling
- Discipline: Road
- Role: Rider

Amateur teams
- 2012: Cycling Club Rus
- 2019: Velo Alanya Regional Team

Professional team
- 2014–2015: Servetto Footon

Marina Likhanova (born 27 October 1990) is a Russian professional racing cyclist.

== Major results ==
2012
2nd Overall Tour of Adygeya
2013
10th Overall Tour of Adygeya
2014
4th Overall Tour of Adygeya
8th Grand Prix de Oriente
2015
4th Grand Prix of Maykop
7th Overall Tour of Adygeya

== See also ==
- List of 2015 UCI Women's Teams and riders
