= 2014 Nagrada Ljubljane TT =

Race details
- Dates: 6 June 2014
- Stages: 1

The 2014 Nagrada Ljubljane TT was a one-day women's time trial race held in Slovenia on 6 June. The race had a UCI rating of 1.2.

== Results ==
| | Rider | Team | Time |
|---|---|---|---|
| 1 | Martina Ritter (AUT) | BTC City Ljubljana | 24' 40" |
| 2 | Vera Koedooder (NED) | Bigla Cycling Team | + 13" |
| 3 | Taryn Heather (AUS) | Bigla Cycling Team | + 34" |
| 4 | Eugenia Bujak (POL) | BTC City Ljubljana | + 34" |
| 5 | Alena Amialiusik (BLR) | Astana BePink | + 37" |
| 6 | Esther Fennel (GER) | | + 40" |
| 7 | Jutta Stienen (SUI) | | + 47" |
| 8 | Reta Trotman (NZL) | | + 47" |
| 9 | Corinna Lechner (GER) | | + 56" |
| 10 | Natalia Boyarskaya (RUS) | Servetto Footon | + 1' 01" |

== See also ==
- 2014 in women's road cycling
