= Ann-Sophie Duyck =

Belgian cyclist

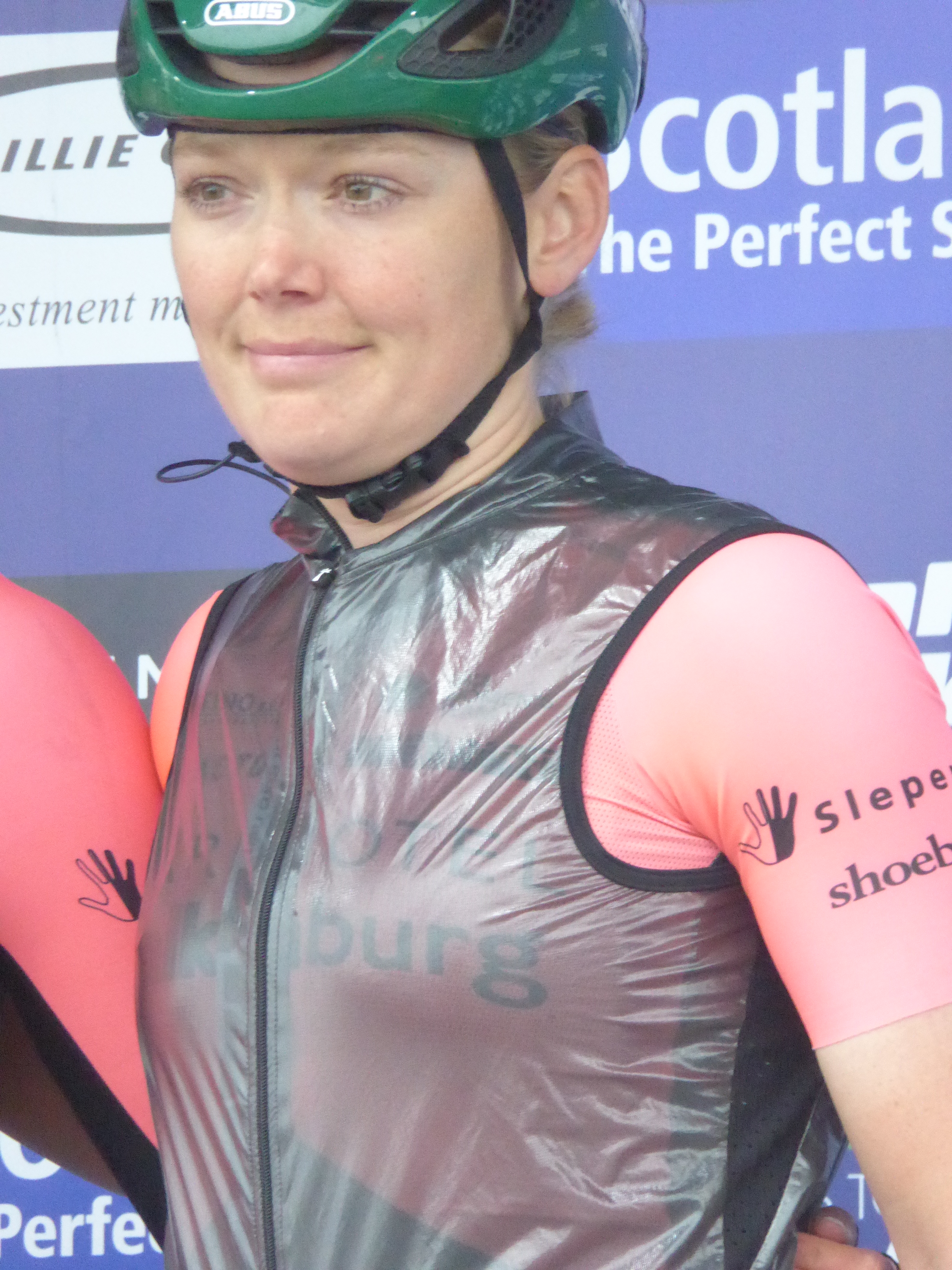
- Duyck at the 2019 Women's Tour of Scotland

Personal information
- Full name: Ann-Sophie Duyck
- Born: 23 July 1987 (age 39) Roeselare, Belgium

Cycling career
- Sport: Cycling
- Current team: Retired
- Discipline: Road
- Role: Rider
- Rider type: Time trialist

Amateur team
- 2014: Autoglas Wetteren–Group Solar

Professional teams
- 2012–2013: Lotto–Belisol Ladies
- 2015–2016: Topsport Vlaanderen–Pro-Duo
- 2017: Drops
- 2018: Cervélo–Bigla Pro Cycling
- 2019–2020: Parkhotel Valkenburg
- 2021: Multum Accountants Ladies

Major wins
- One day races & Classics National Time Trial Championships (2014–2018) Erondegemse Pijl (Erpe-Mere) (2014)

Ann-Sophie Duyck (born 23 July 1987) is a Belgian triathlete and former racing cyclist, who rode professionally between 2012 and 2021 for six different teams. She competed in the 2013 UCI women's team time trial in Florence. By winning her fourth Belgian National Time Trial Championships in 2017, Duyck became the first Belgian road cyclist to win four consecutive titles in their discipline. She took a total of 16 professional victories, 14 of which came in individual time trials.

== Major results ==
2011
1st Time trial, West Flanders Provincial Road Championships
6th Time trial, National Road Championships
2012
3rd Time trial, National Road Championships
9th Chrono des Nations
2013
1st Time trial, West Flanders Provincial Road Championships
1st Borlo Chrono (April)
1st Borlo Chrono (May)
9th Time trial, National Road Championships
2014
1st Time trial, National Road Championships
1st Time trial, West Flanders Provincial Road Championships
1st Erondegemse Pijl
3rd Overall Trophée d'Or Féminin

1st Stage 2 (ITT)

4th Chrono Champenois-Trophée Européen
5th UCI Road World Championships – Women's time trial
2015
1st Time trial, National Road Championships
1st Time trial, West Flanders Provincial Road Championships
1st Chrono Champenois
1st Stage 1 (ITT) Auensteiner–Radsporttage
2nd Ljubljana–Domžale–Ljubljana TT
3rd Chrono des Nations
6th Overall BeNe Ladies Tour
6th Overall Trophée d'Or Féminin

1st Stage 1 (ITT)

7th Time trial, European Games
9th UCI Road World Championships – Women's time trial
2016
1st Time trial, National Road Championships
1st Ljubljana–Domžale–Ljubljana TT
1st Chrono des Nations
2nd Overall Tour de Bretagne Féminin
6th Time trial, UEC European Road Championships
7th Chrono Champenois
8th UCI Road World Championships – Women's time trial
8th Overall Gracia–Orlová

1st Stage 3 (ITT)

2017
1st Time trial, National Road Championships
1st Time trial, West Flanders Provincial Road Championships
1st Ljubljana–Domžale–Ljubljana TT
2nd Time trial, UEC European Road Championships
2nd Chrono des Nations
3rd Overall Tour de Feminin – O cenu Českého Švýcarska

1st Stage 3 (ITT)

5th Overall Setmana Ciclista Valenciana

1st Mountains classification
1st Stage 2

8th Overall Emakumeen Euskal Bira
8th Overall Thüringen Rundfahrt der Frauen
8th Grand Prix de Plumelec-Morbihan Dames
9th Overall Grand Prix Elsy Jacobs
10th Dwars door Vlaanderen
2018
1st Time trial, National Road Championships
1st Time trial, West Flanders Provincial Road Championships
3rd Crescent Vårgårda TTT
3rd Team time trial, Ladies Tour of Norway
5th Ljubljana–Domžale–Ljubljana TT
5th Chrono Champenois
6th Chrono des Nations
9th Time trial, UEC European Road Championships
Combativity award Stage 3 The Women's Tour
2019
2nd Road race, National Road Championships
2021
1st Time trial, West Flanders Provincial Road Championships
8th Chrono des Nations
