= Luisa Ibarrola =

Spanish cyclist (born 2000)

Personal information
- Full name: Luisa Ibarrola Albizua
- Born: 13 March 2000 (age 26)

Cycling career
- Sport: Cycling
- Discipline: Road
- Role: Rider

Amateur team
- 2017–2018: Bizikleta.com

Professional team
- 2019: Bizkaia–Durango

Luisa Ibarrola Albizua (born 13 March 2000) is a Spanish professional racing cyclist, who last rode for the UCI Women's Team Bizkaia–Durango during the 2019 women's road cycling season.
