= Zanele Tshoko =

South African cyclist

Personal information
- Full name: Zanele Tshoko
- Born: 15 February 1993 (age 33)

Cycling career
- Sport: Cycling
- Discipline: Road
- Role: Rider

Amateur teams
- 2016: Time Freight
- 2017–2018: Team Bestmed–ASG

Zanele Tshoko (born 15 February 1993) is a South African professional racing cyclist. She rode in the women's road race at the 2016 UCI Road World Championships, but she did not finish the race.
