= Anastasia Chursina =

Russian cyclist

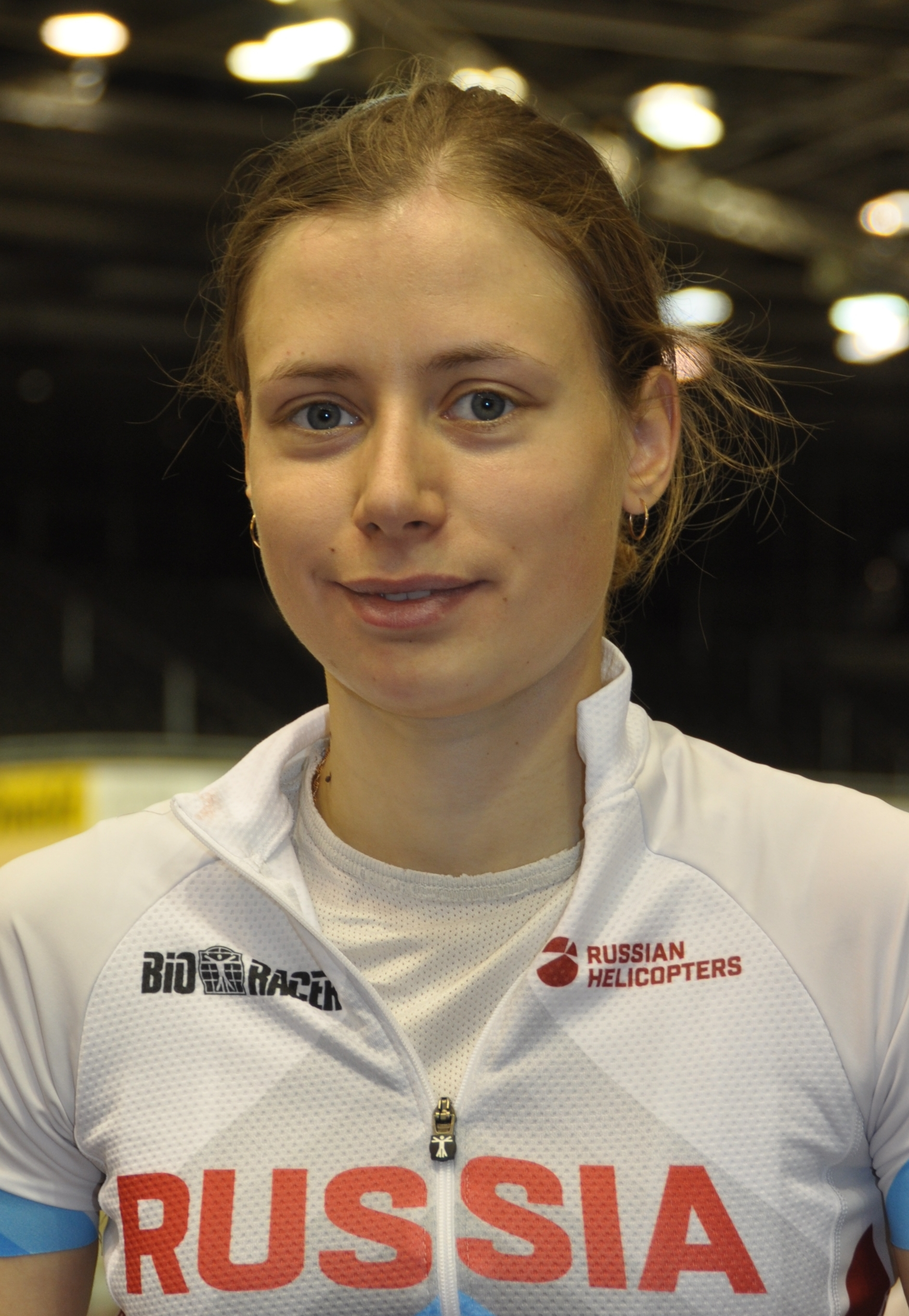
- Chursina in 2018

Personal information
- Full name: Anastasia Aleksandrovna Chursina
- Born: Anastasia Aleksandrovna Yakovenko; 7 April 1995 (age 31) Saint Petersburg, Russia

Cycling career
- Sport: Cycling
- Disciplines: Road; Track
- Role: Rider

Professional teams
- 2018–2019: BTC City Ljubljana
- 2020–2021: Alé BTC Ljubljana

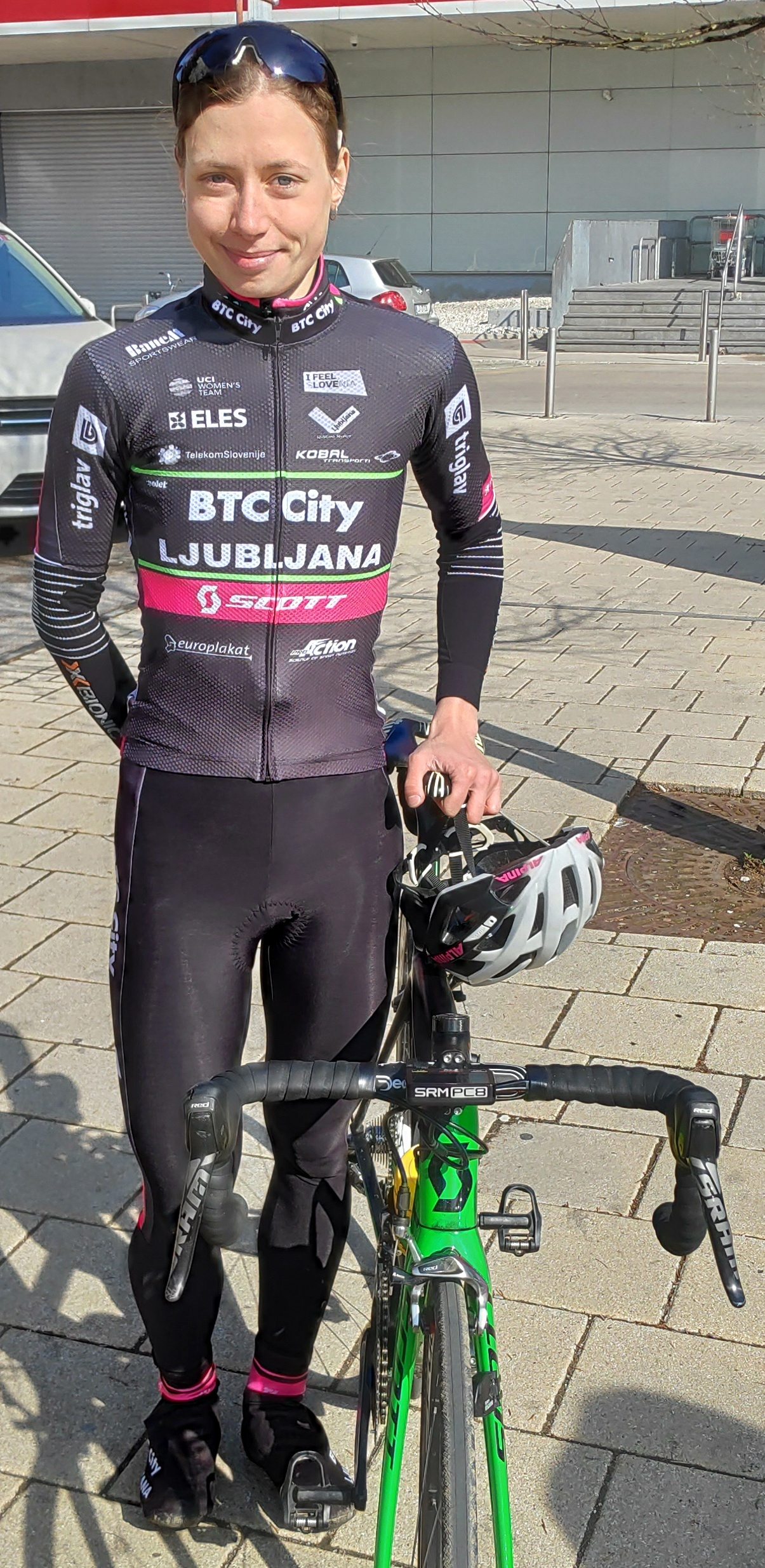
Chursina in 2019 in jersey of BTC City Ljubljana

Anastasia Aleksandrovna Chursina (Анастасия Александровна Чурсина; née Yakovenko; born 7 April 1995) ...is a Russian racing cyclist, who most recently rode for UCI Women's WorldTeam Roland. She rode at the 2014 UCI Road World Championships.

== Major results ==
2013
UCI Junior Road World Championships

2nd Road race
5th Time trial

4th Time trial, UEC European Junior Road Championships
2014
1st Young rider classification Trophée d'Or Féminin
10th Overall Tour of Adygeya
2015
1st Grand Prix of Maykop
2nd Overall Tour of Adygeya

1st Stage 3

8th Time trial, UEC European Under-23 Road Championships
2016
1st Time trial, UEC European Under-23 Road Championships
2nd Time trial, National Road Championships
2017
National Road Championships

1st Road race
4th Time trial

2nd Overall Tour of Zhoushan Island
3rd Individual pursuit, National Track Championships
6th Overall Gracia–Orlová
6th Ljubljana–Domžale–Ljubljana TT
10th Overall Giro della Toscana Int. Femminile – Memorial Michela Fanini
2018
1st Team pursuit, National Track Championships (with Gulnaz Badykova, Aleksandra Goncharova and Evgeniya Augustinas)
2nd Madison, International Belgian Track Meeting
3rd Overall Tour of Chongming Island

1st Young rider classification

5th Road race, National Road Championships
5th Grand Prix de Plumelec-Morbihan Dames
6th Ljubljana–Domžale–Ljubljana TT
7th La Classique Morbihan
9th La Flèche Wallonne Féminine
2019
3rd Overall Giro della Toscana Int. Femminile – Memorial Michela Fanini
4th Trofeo Alfredo Binda-Comune di Cittiglio
4th Donostia San Sebastian Klasikoa
7th Grand Prix Gazipaşa
2020
2nd Grand Prix Develi
2nd Grand Prix World's Best High Altitude
4th Grand Prix Cappadocia
7th Overall Women's Herald Sun Tour
7th Grand Prix Mount Erciyes
2021
1st Stage 2 Vuelta a Burgos Feminas
1st Kahramanmaraş Grand Prix Road Race
4th Germenica Grand Prix Road Race
5th Grand Prix Kayseri
National Road Championships

5th Road race
5th Time trial

7th Grand Prix Develi
