= Nadine Gill =

German cyclist

Personal information
- Full name: Nadine Michaela Gill
- Born: 19 April 1991 (age 35)

Cycling career
- Sport: Cycling
- Discipline: Road
- Role: Rider

Amateur teams
- 2004–2006: TV Mosbach
- 2020: Belori Vipeq
- 2020: Team Stuttgart

Professional teams
- 2020–2021: Bizkaia–Durango
- 2022: Sopela Women's Team
- 2023: Ceratizit–WNT Pro Cycling

Nadine Michaela Gill (born 19 April 1991) is a German professional racing cyclist, who rode for UCI Women's Continental Team Bizkaia–Durango.

== Major results ==
2019
7th Overall Giro delle Marche in Rosa
2021
National Road Championships

3rd Road race
6th Time trial

5th Overall Vuelta Ciclista Andalucía Ruta del Sol
5th Gran Premio Ciudad de Eibar
8th Grand Prix Féminin de Chambéry
10th Durango-Durango Emakumeen Saria
2022
8th Grand Prix Féminin de Chambéry
2023
9th Women Cycling Pro Costa De Almería
