= Lucía González Blanco =

Spanish cyclist (born 1990)

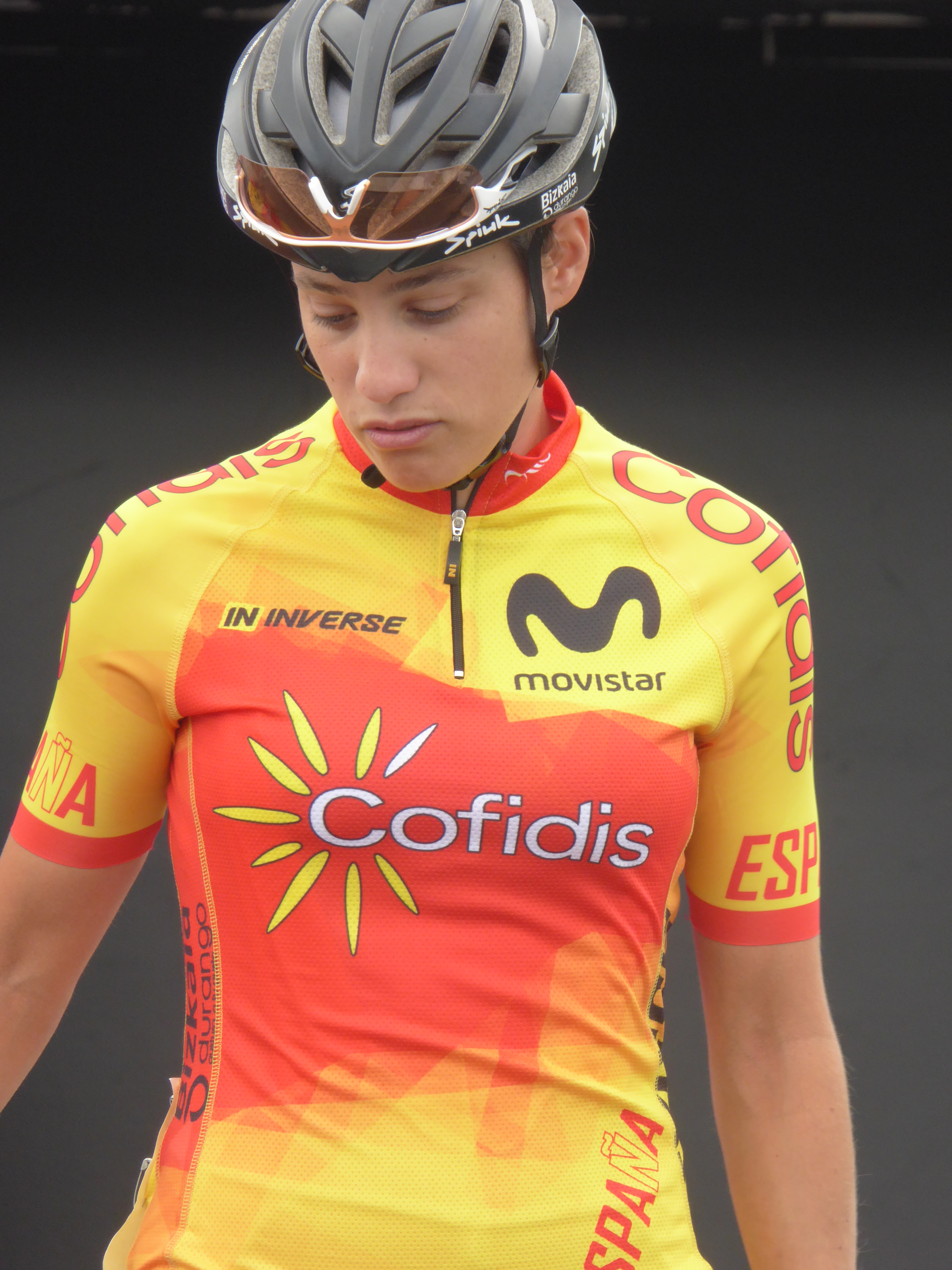
- González Blanco at the 2018 European Road Cycling Championships.

Personal information
- Full name: Lucía González Blanco
- Born: 9 July 1990 (age 36)

Cycling career
- Sport: Cycling
- Current team: Nesta–Škoda Alecar (cyclo-cross)
- Disciplines: Cyclo-cross; Road
- Role: Rider

Professional teams
- 2010–2017: Lointek
- 2018–2023: Bizkaia Durango–Euskadi Murias (road)
- 2018–: Nesta CX Team (cyclo-cross)

Lucía González Blanco (born 9 July 1990) is a Spanish professional cyclo-cross and road racing cyclist, who rode for UCI Women's Continental Team Bizkaia–Durango in road racing, and rides for UCI Cyclo-cross Team Nesta–Škoda Alecar in cyclo-cross. She represented her nation in the women's elite event at the 2016 UCI Cyclo-cross World Championships in Heusden-Zolder.

She finished third in the 2013 Spanish National Road Race Championships.

== See also ==
- List of 2015 UCI Women's Teams and riders
