= Yusseli Mendivil =

Mexican cyclist

Personal information
- Full name: Yusseli Guadalupe Mendivil Soto
- Born: 6 September 1991 (age 35)

Cycling career
- Sport: Cycling
- Discipline: Road
- Role: Rider

Amateur teams
- 2015–2016: ISCorp Pro Cycling
- 2018: ISCorp Pro Cycling
- 2019: Colavita–Bialetti

Professional team
- 2017: Team Illuminate

Yusseli Guadalupe Mendivil Soto (born 6 September 1991) is a Mexican racing cyclist, who last rode for American amateur team Colavita–Bialetti. Mendivil has also competed for UCI Women's Team Team Illuminate in 2017. She rode in the women's road race at the 2016 UCI Road World Championships, finishing in 21st place. In 2011, she finished fourth at the Vuelta Femenina a Guatemala, and finished third at the Tour of America's Dairyland in 2015.
