= Natalia Boyarskaya =

Russian cyclist (born 1983)

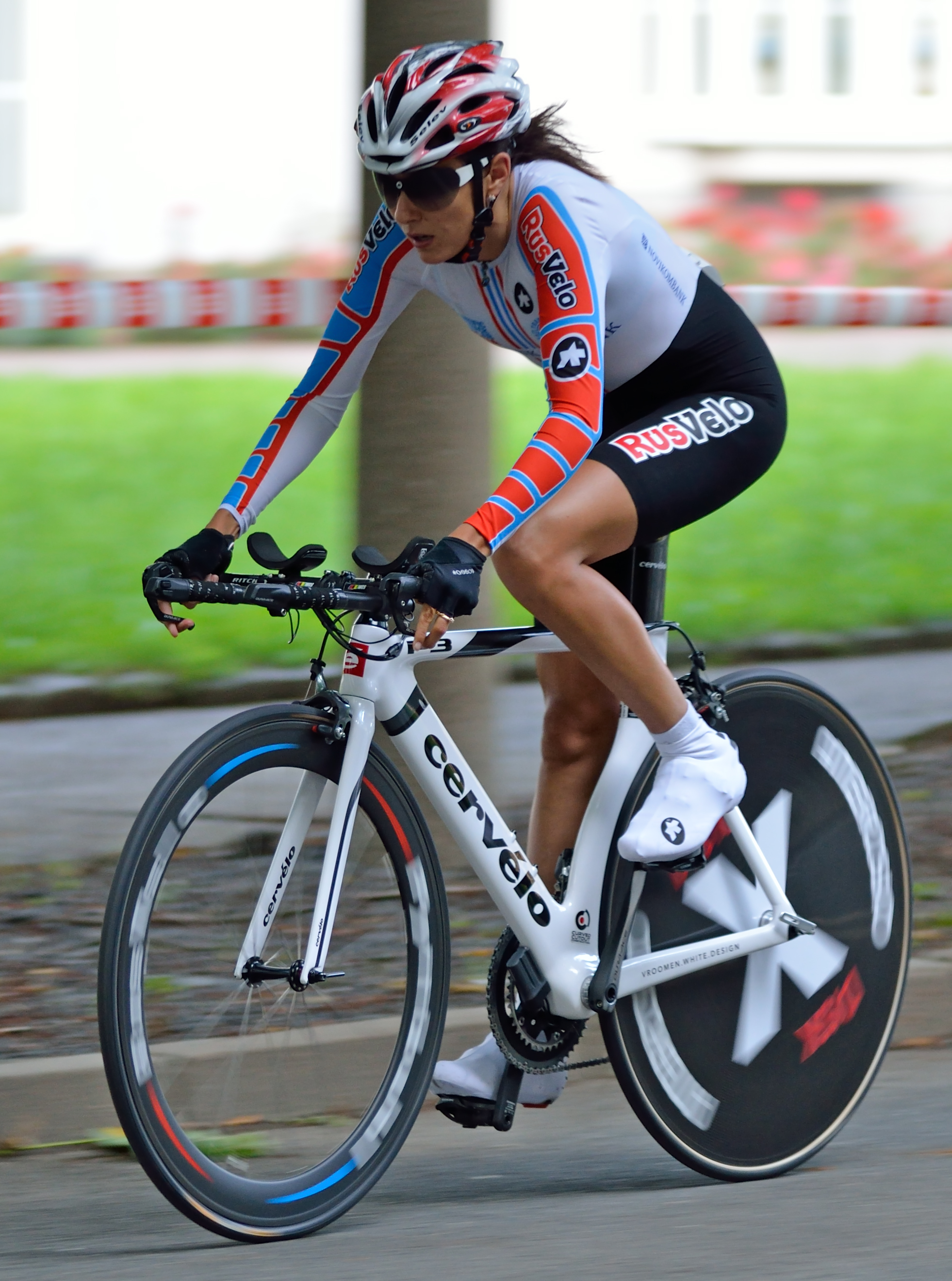

Personal information
- Full name: Natalia Sergeyevna Boyarskaya
- Born: February 27, 1983 (age 43) Priargunsk, Russian SFSR, Soviet Union
- Height: 1.67 m (5 ft 6 in)
- Weight: 67 kg (148 lb; 10.6 st)

Cycling career
- Sport: Cycling
- Current team: Retired
- Discipline: Road
- Role: Rider

Professional teams
- 2006–2011: Fenixs–Colnago
- 2006–2016: Russia (National team)
- 2012: RusVelo
- 2013: Team Pratomagno Women
- 2014: Servetto Footon

Natalia Sergeyevna Boyarskaya (born 27 February 1983) is a Russian former professional racing cyclist. She represented her country at the 2008 Summer Olympics in Beijing. Boyarskaya broke away from the main peloton in the road race and managed to build up a lead of 59 seconds, but had to stop when she could not see which way to choose. She was eventually caught and went on to finish 40th, and three days later she finished 16th in the time trial.

== Major results ==
2000
4th Road race, UCI Junior Road World Championships
2001
UCI Junior Road World Championships

2nd Time trial
4th Road race

2nd Points race, UEC European Junior Track Championships
3rd Points race, UCI Juniors Track World Championships
2002
9th Road race, National Road Championships
2003
9th Time trial, UEC European Under-23 Road Championships
2004
4th Time trial, UEC European Under-23 Road Championships
5th Overall Tour of Poland
2005
5th Overall Tour of Poland
7th Overall Gracia–Orlová
2006
1st Stage 3 Grande Boucle Féminine Internationale
7th Overall Giro della Toscana Int. Femminile – Memorial Michela Fanini
10th Overall Tour Féminin en Limousin
2007
National Road Championships

1st Road race
6th Time trial

5th Overall La Route de France
6th Overall Tour Féminin en Limousin
2008
1st Overall Tour Féminin en Limousin

1st Mountains classification
1st Stage 4

National Road Championships

3rd Road race
3rd Time trial

3rd Overall Wyscig Etapowy - Zamosc Féminin
3rd Overall Gracia–Orlová
9th Memorial Davide Fardelli
2010
6th Overall Tour Féminin en Limousin
7th GP de Plouay – Bretagne
8th Overall Trophée d'Or Féminin
10th Overall Giro della Toscana Int. Femminile – Memorial Michela Fanini
2011
2nd Overall Gracia–Orlová

1st Stage 1

2nd Overall Tour de Feminin-O cenu Českého Švýcarska
3rd Team pursuit, National Track Championships
9th Overall Thüringen Rundfahrt der Frauen
2012
2nd Time trial, National Road Championships
5th Open de Suède Vårgårda TTT
5th Chrono Champenois
2013
1st Overall Tour of Adygeya

1st Points classification
1st Stages 2 (ITT) & 4

1st Grand Prix of Maykop
6th Overall Gracia-Orlová
6th Overall Tour de Bretagne Féminin
10th Overall Tour de Feminin – O cenu Ceského Švýcarska
2014
1st Overall Tour of Adygeya

1st Points classification
1st Stages 1 (ITT) & 2

4th Overall Gracia-Orlová

1st Stage 2

8th GP du Canton d'Argovie
10th Nagrada Ljubljane TT
2015
2nd Time trial, National Road Championships
3rd Overall Tour of Adygeya

1st Prologue

5th Overall Gracia–Orlová
7th Grand Prix of Maykop
8th Overall Tour de Bretagne Féminin
8th Overall Giro della Toscana Int. Femminile – Memorial Michela Fanini
2016
National Road Championships

1st Road race
1st Time trial

3rd Overall Tour de Feminin-O cenu Českého Švýcarska

1st Stage 3 (ITT)

6th Overall Tour of Zhoushan Island
