= 2015 European Road Championships – Women's under-23 time trial =

Women's under-23 time trial
2015 European Road Championships
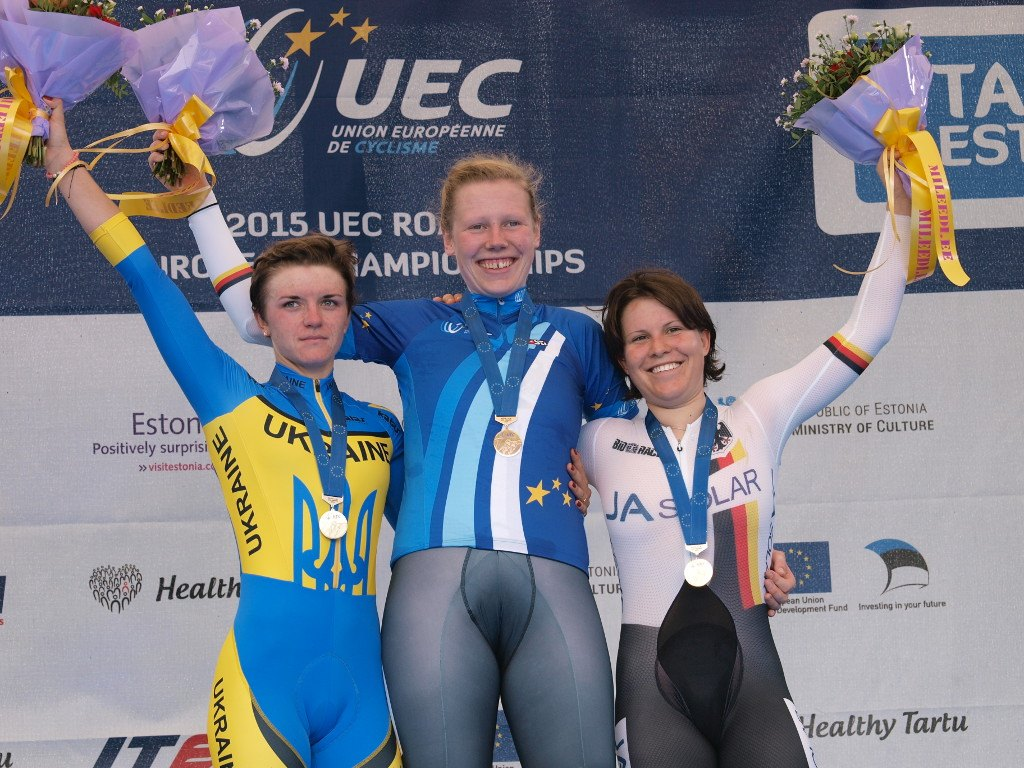
- Podium of the event

Race details
- Dates: 6 August 2015 in (Estonia) Tartu (EST)
- Stages: 1
- Distance: 18.4 km (11.43 mi)
- Winning time: 24' 57"

Results
	Winner	Mieke Kröger (GER)
	Second	Olga Shekel (UKR)
	Third	Corinna Lechner (GER)

The Women's under-23 time trial at the 2015 European Road Championships took place on 6 August. The Championships were hosted by the Estonian city Tartu. The course was 18.4 km long. 28 cyclists competed in the time trial. The course had a total elevation of 53m, with a maximal inclination of 5.1% and a maximal slope downhill of 4.9%.

The race was won by Mieke Kröger, who also won the time trial in 2014 in a time of 24' 57" with an average speed of 44.25 km/hour.

== Top 10 final classification ==
Rank	Rider	Time
1st place, gold medalist(s)	Mieke Kröger (GER)	24' 57"
2nd place, silver medalist(s)	Olga Shekel (UKR)	+ 8"
3rd place, bronze medalist(s)	Corinna Lechner (GER)	+ 19"
4	Thalita de Jong (NED)	+ 32"
5	Katarzyna Niewiadoma (POL)	+ 33"
6	Sabrina Stultiens (NED)	+ 44"
7	Maria Giulia Confalonieri (ITA)	+ 52"
8	Anastasia Iakovenko (RUS)	+ 52"
9	Sheyla Gutiérrez (ESP)	+ 53"
10	Floortje Mackaij (NED)	+ 57"

== See also ==
- 2015 European Road Championships – Women's under-23 road race
