= Servetto–Makhymo–Beltrami TSA =

Italian cycling team

Team information
- UCI code: SER
- Registered: Italy
- Founded: 2013
- Discipline: Road
- Status: UCI Women's Team (2013–2019); UCI Women's Continental Team (2020–present)
- Bicycles: Argon 18

Team name history
- 2013–2016 2017 2018 2019–2020 2021–: Servetto Footon; Servetto Giusta; Servetto–Stradalli Cycle–Alurecycling; Servetto–Piumate–Beltrami TSA; Servetto–Makhymo–Beltrami TSA

Servetto–Makhymo–Beltrami TSA (UCI team code: SER) is a professional cycling team based in Italy, which competes in elite road bicycle racing events such as the UCI Women's World Tour.

== Team history ==
For the 2015 season Veronica Cornolti, Marina Likhanova, Anna Potokina and Sari Saarelainen signed contract extensions. On November 5 Elena Kuchinskaya signed with the team. On November 8 the team signed Tatiana Antoshina and Elena Franchi. On November 11 Manuela Sonzogni signed with the team. On November 13 Vittoria Bussi and Riccarda Mazzotta joined the team. On October 30, Annalisa Cucinotta left the team, joining Alé–Cipollini for the 2015 season.

== Team roster ==
As of 10 March 2021.

Rider	Date of birth
Carlotta Borello (ITA)	7 January 2002 (age 24)
Sara Casasola (ITA)	29 November 1999 (age 26)
Nadja Heigl (AUT)	15 February 1996 (age 30)
Tereza Korvasová (CZE)	29 June 1996 (age 30)
Rosalia Ortíz (ESP)	20 March 1999 (age 27)

Rider	Date of birth
Anna Potokina (RUS)	18 June 1987 (age 39)
Elis Simeoni (ITA)	24 April 1993 (age 33)
Lina Svarinska (LAT)	15 March 2001 (age 25)
Asia Zontone (ITA)	4 November 2001 (age 24)

== Major wins ==
2014
Stage 2 (ITT) Gracia-Orlová, Natalia Boyarskaya
Overall Tour of Adygeya, Natalia Boyarskaya

Points classification, Natalia Boyarskaya
Stages 1 (ITT) & 2, Natalia Boyarskaya

2015
Ljubljana–Domžale–Ljubljana TT, Tatiana Antoshina
2017
Overall Clasica Alcaldia de Anapoima, Ana Sanabria

Stage 3, Ana Sanabria

Stage 1 Vuelta a Cundinamarca, Ana Sanabria
Overall Vuelta Al Tolima, Ana Sanabria

Stages 1 & 2, Ana Sanabaria

Overall Clásica de El Carmen de Viboral, Ana Sanabria

Stage 3, Ana Sanabaria

Overall Vuelta Femenino del Porvenir, Ana Sanabria

Stages 1 & 4, Ana Sanabria

Overall Vuelta a Colombia y Oro Paz, Ana Sanabria

Prologue, Stages 3 & 5, Ana Sanabria

2018
Memorial Diego e Stefano Trovó, Katja Jeretina
Stage 1 Tour of Zhoushan Island, Argiro Milaki
Time Trial, South American Games, Ana Sanabria
Road Race, South American Games, Ana Sanabria
Track (Team Pursuit), South American Games, Jessica Parra
Track (Madison), South American Games, Jessica Parra
Sprints classification Tour Cycliste Féminin International de l'Ardèche, Kseniya Dobrynina

Combativity classification, Kseniya Dobrynina

Overall Vuelta a Colombia Femenina, Ana Sanabria

Stage 3 (ITT), Ana Sanabria

== National champions ==
2014
Italy Track (Scratch Race), Annalisa Cucinotta
2015
Russia Time Trial, Tatiana Antoshina
Russia Road Race, Anna Potokina
Switzerland Road Race, Jolanda Neff
European Mountainbike (XC), Jolanda Neff
2016
European Mountainbike (XC), Jolanda Neff
Latvia Road Race, Lija Laizāne
Latvia Time Trial, Lija Laizāne
World Mountainbike (Marathon), Jolanda Neff
2017
Kazakhstan Time Trial, Natalya Sokovnina
Cyprus Road Race, Antri Christoforou
Cyprus Mountainbike (XC), Antri Christoforou
2018
Greece Road Race, Argiro Milaki
Greece Track (Keirin), Argiro Milaki
Greece Track (Scratch Race), Argiro Milaki
2019
Italy Cyclo-cross, Sara Casasola
Russia Road Race, Aleksandra Goncharova
Russia Track (Team Pursuit), Aleksandra Goncharova
