= Najla Aljeraiwi =

Kuwaiti cyclist

Personal information
- Born: 26 October 1988 (age 37)

Cycling career
- Sport: Cycling
- Role: Rider

Najla Aljeraiwi (born 26 October 1988) is a Kuwaiti professional racing cyclist. She competed at the 2016 UCI Road World Championships in the women's time trial but fell after riding ito a fence and finished 38th, and in the women's road race, but she did not finish the race.

She is the younger sister of road cyclist Nada Aljeraiwi who also competed at the 2016 UCI Road World Championships.
