= Yulia Ilinykh =

Russian cyclist

Personal information
- Born: 6 October 1985 (age 41) Russia

Cycling career
- Sport: Cycling
- Current team: Retired
- Discipline: Road
- Role: Rider

Professional teams
- 2007–2010: Petrogradets
- 2012–2013: Lointek
- 2014–2015: Bizkaia–Durango

Yulia Ilinykh (born 6 October 1985) is a Russian former professional road cyclist. She was the winner of the 2009 Russian National Road Race Championships, and she also won the 2014 Grand Prix of Maykop.

== Major results ==
2009
1st Road race, National Road Championships
2011
5th Overall Tour de Bretagne Féminin
5th Overall Tour Féminin en Limousin
8th Novilon Eurocup Ronde van Drenthe
2013
5th Grand Prix of Maykop
2014
1st Grand Prix of Maykop
2015
3rd Overall Vuelta a Burgos Feminas

1st Points classification
1st Stages 2 & 3

6th Road race, Military World Games
