= Samantha Sanders =

South African cyclist

Personal information
- Born: 21 August 1983 (age 43) South Africa

Cycling career
- Sport: Cycling
- Role: Rider

Samantha Sanders (born 21 August 1983) is a South African professional racing cyclist. She rode in the women's road race at the 2016 UCI Road World Championships, finishing in 41st place.
