= Kseniya Dobrynina =

Russian cyclist

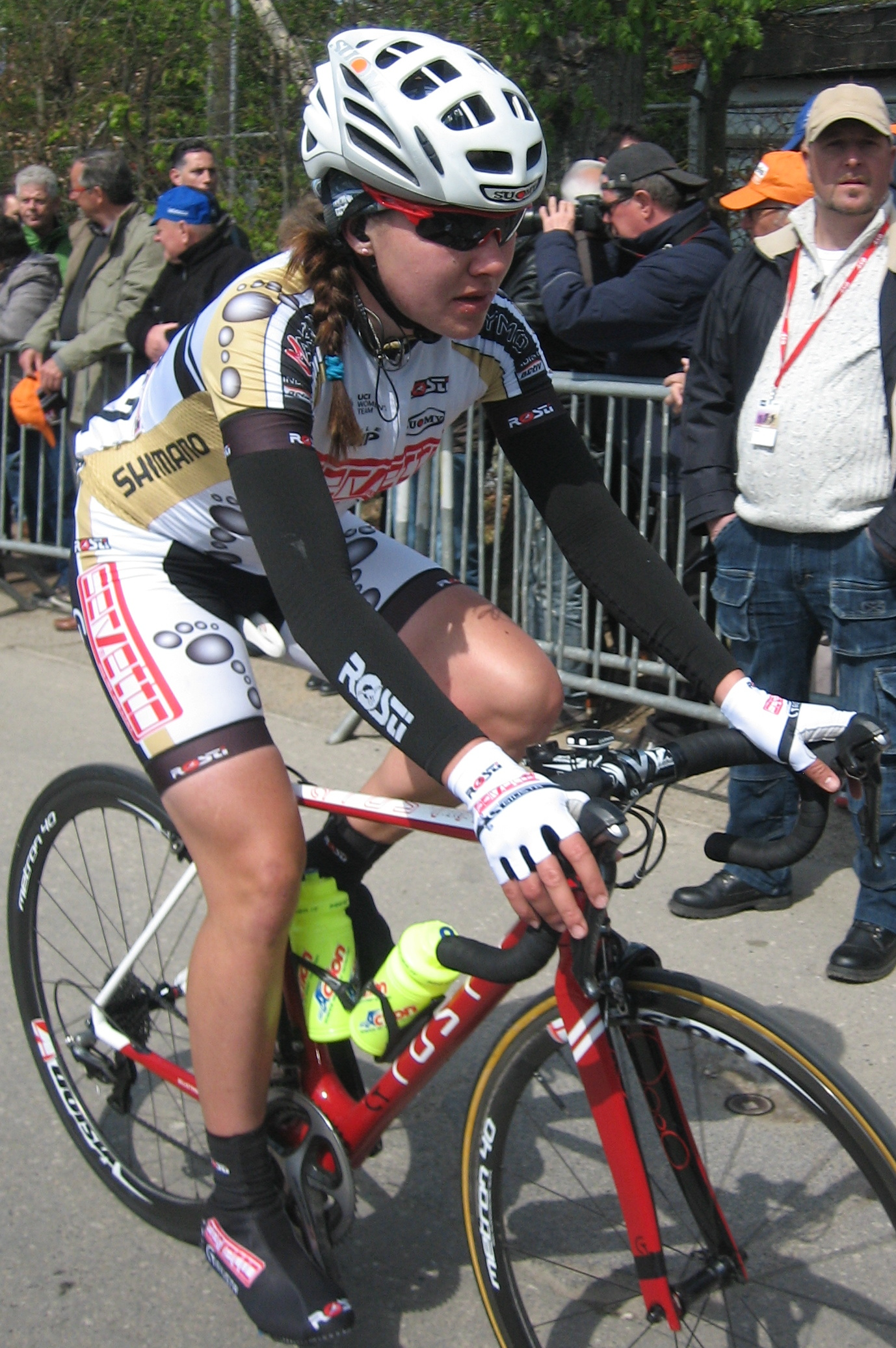
- Dobrynina at the 2017 Flèche Wallonne

Personal information
- Full name: Kseniya Dobrynina
- Born: 11 January 1994 (age 32) Voronezh, Russia

Cycling career
- Sport: Cycling
- Discipline: Road
- Role: Rider

Professional teams
- 2013: RusVelo
- 2014: Astana BePink Women Team
- 2015–2016: Astana–Acca Due O
- 2017–2020: Servetto Giusta

Kseniya Dobrynina (also written as Ksenia Dobrynina; born 11 January 1994) is a Russian professional racing cyclist, who most recently rode for UCI Women's Continental Team Servetto–Piumate–Beltrami TSA.

== Major results ==
2011
8th Time trial, UEC European Junior Road Championships

2012
2nd Time trial, UEC European Junior Road Championships

2013
2nd Time trial, National Road Championships
3rd Time trial, UEC European Under-23 Road Championships

2014
National Road Championships

2nd Time trial
3rd Road race

2nd GP Sälipark
6th Grand Prix of Maykop
7th Time trial, UEC European Under-23 Road Championships
9th GP Osterhas

2015
4th Time trial, National Road Championships

2016
6th Time trial, National Road Championships

2017
6th Time trial, National Road Championships
7th Ljubljana–Domžale–Ljubljana
8th Overall Tour of Chongming Island
9th Overall Giro Toscana Int. Femminile – Memorial Michela Fanini

2018
Tour Cycliste Féminin International de l'Ardèche

1st Sprints classification
1st Combativity classification

National Road Championships

4th Time trial
7th Road race

== See also ==
- List of 2016 UCI Women's Teams and riders
