= Nada Aljeraiwi =

Kuwaiti cyclist

Personal information
- Born: 24 June 1985 (age 41)

Cycling career
- Sport: Cycling
- Role: Rider

Nada Aljeraiwi (born 24 June 1985) is a Kuwaiti professional racing cyclist. She rode in the women's time trial and women's road race at the 2016 UCI Road World Championships, but she did not finish the race.

She is the older sister of road cyclist Najla Aljeraiwi who also competed at the 2016 UCI Road World Championships.
