= Tatiana Shamanova =

Russian cyclist

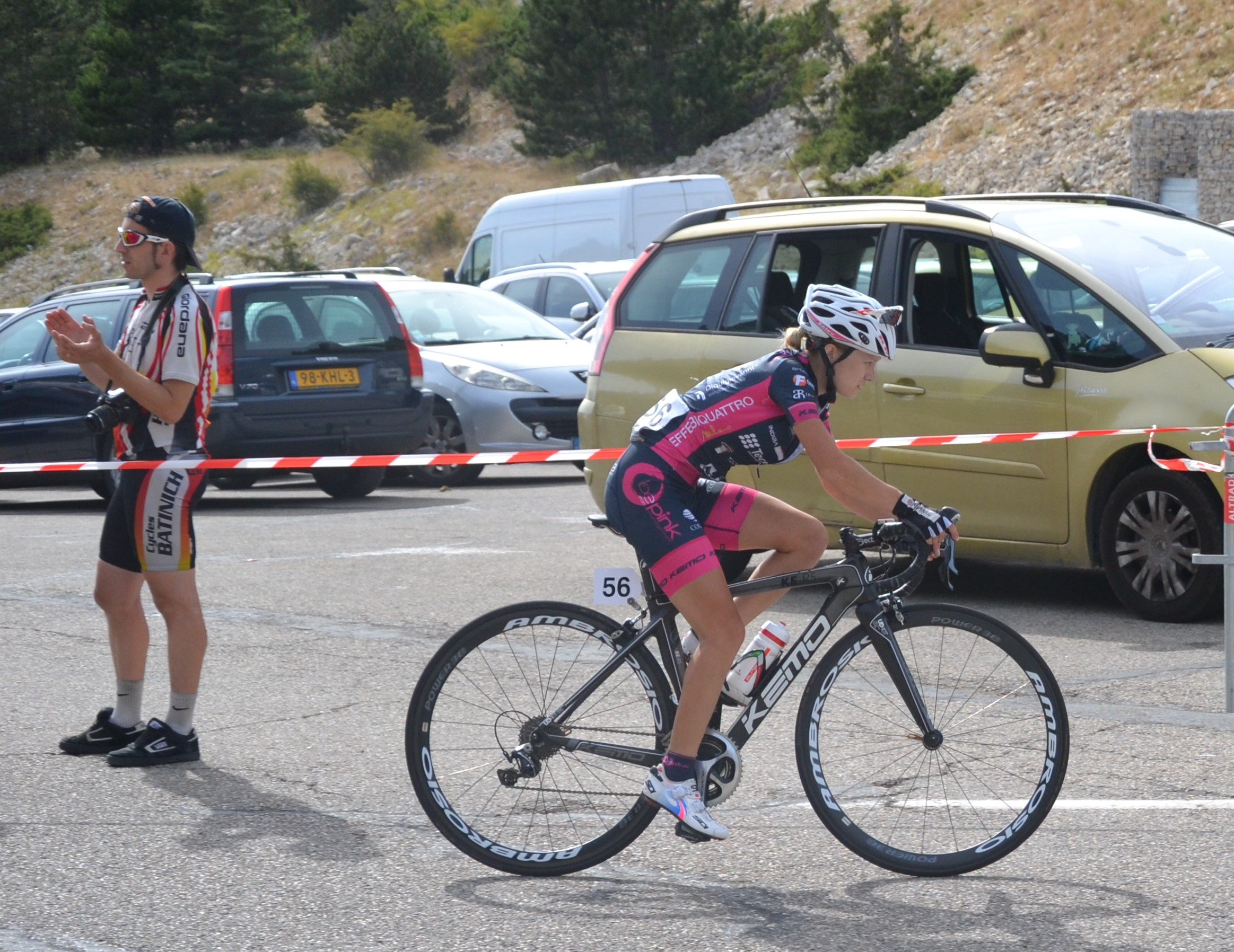
- Shamanova in 2016

Personal information
- Born: 18 January 1992 (age 34)

Cycling career
- Sport: Cycling
- Current team: Retired
- Discipline: Road
- Role: Rider

Professional team
- 2016–2017: Bepink

Tatiana Shamanova (born 18 January 1992) is a Russian former professional racing cyclist. For three consecutive years, Shamanova finished in the top ten overall of the Tour of Adygeya – seventh in 2013, third in 2014 and fifth in 2015.

== See also ==
- List of 2016 UCI Women's Teams and riders
