= Alicja Ratajczak =

Polish cyclist

Personal information
- Born: 25 June 1995 (age 31)

Cycling career
- Sport: Cycling
- Role: Rider

Alicja Ratajczak (born 25 June 1995) is a Polish professional racing cyclist. She rode in the women's road race at the 2016 UCI Road World Championships, but she did not finish the race.
