= 2013 Grand Prix of Maykop =

Race details
- Dates: 4 June 2013
- Distance: 98.6 km (61.27 mi)

Results
| | Winner | Natalia Boyarskaya (RUS) | |
| | Second | Anastasia Chulkova (RUS) | (RusVelo) |
| | Third | Ekaterina Malomoura (RUS) | |

The 2013 Grand Prix of Maykop was a one-day women's cycle race held in Russia on June 4 2013. The tour has an UCI rating of 1.2. The race was won by the Russian, Natalia Boyarskaya.

Result

| | Rider | Team | Time |
|---|---|---|---|
| 1 | Natalia Boyarskaya (RUS) | | 2h 26' 13" |
| 2 | Anastasia Chulkova (RUS) | RusVelo | + 1" |
| 3 | Ekaterina Malomoura (RUS) | | + 33" |
| 4 | Viktoriya Volohdina (UKR) | | + 33" |
| 5 | Yulia Iliynikh (RUS) | Lointek | + 1' 23" |
| 6 | Tereza Trefna (CZE) | Boels–Dolmans Cycling Team | + 1' 23" |
| 7 | Svetlana Stolbova (RUS) | Team Pratomagno Women | + 1' 23" |
| 8 | Maryna Ivanyuk (UKR) | | + 1' 23" |
| 9 | Olga Demidova (RUS) | | + 1' 23" |
| 10 | Elena Gogoleva (RUS) | | + 1' 23" |
