= Guo Hong (cyclist) =

Chinese cyclist

Personal information
- Born: 31 October 1991 (age 34)

Cycling career
- Sport: Cycling
- Role: Rider

Guo Hong (born 31 October 1991) is a Chinese professional racing cyclist. She rode in the women's road race at the 2016 UCI Road World Championships, but she did not finish the race.
