= Ksenyia Tuhai =

Belarusian cyclist

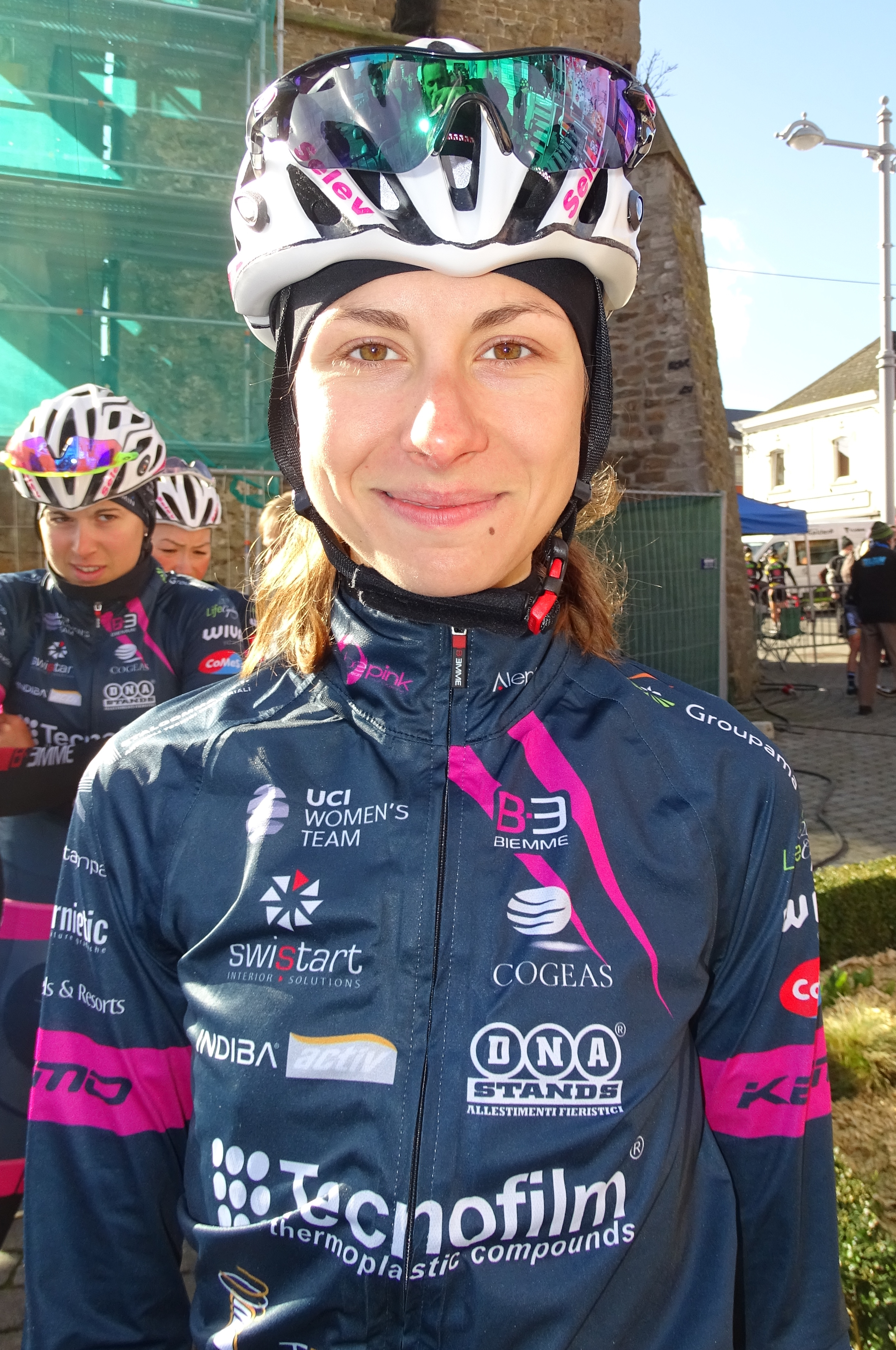
- Tuhai in 2016.

Personal information
- Full name: Ksenyia Tuhai
- Born: 1 July 1995 (age 31) Minsk, Belarus

Cycling career
- Sport: Cycling
- Discipline: Road
- Role: Rider

Professional teams
- 2014–2017: Astana BePink Women Team
- 2018: Cogeas

Ksenyia Tuhai (born 1 July 1995) is a Belarusian racing cyclist, who last rode for UCI Women's Team Cogeas–Mettler Pro Cycling Team. She rode at the 2014 UCI Road World Championships.
