= Olga Shekel =

Ukrainian cyclist

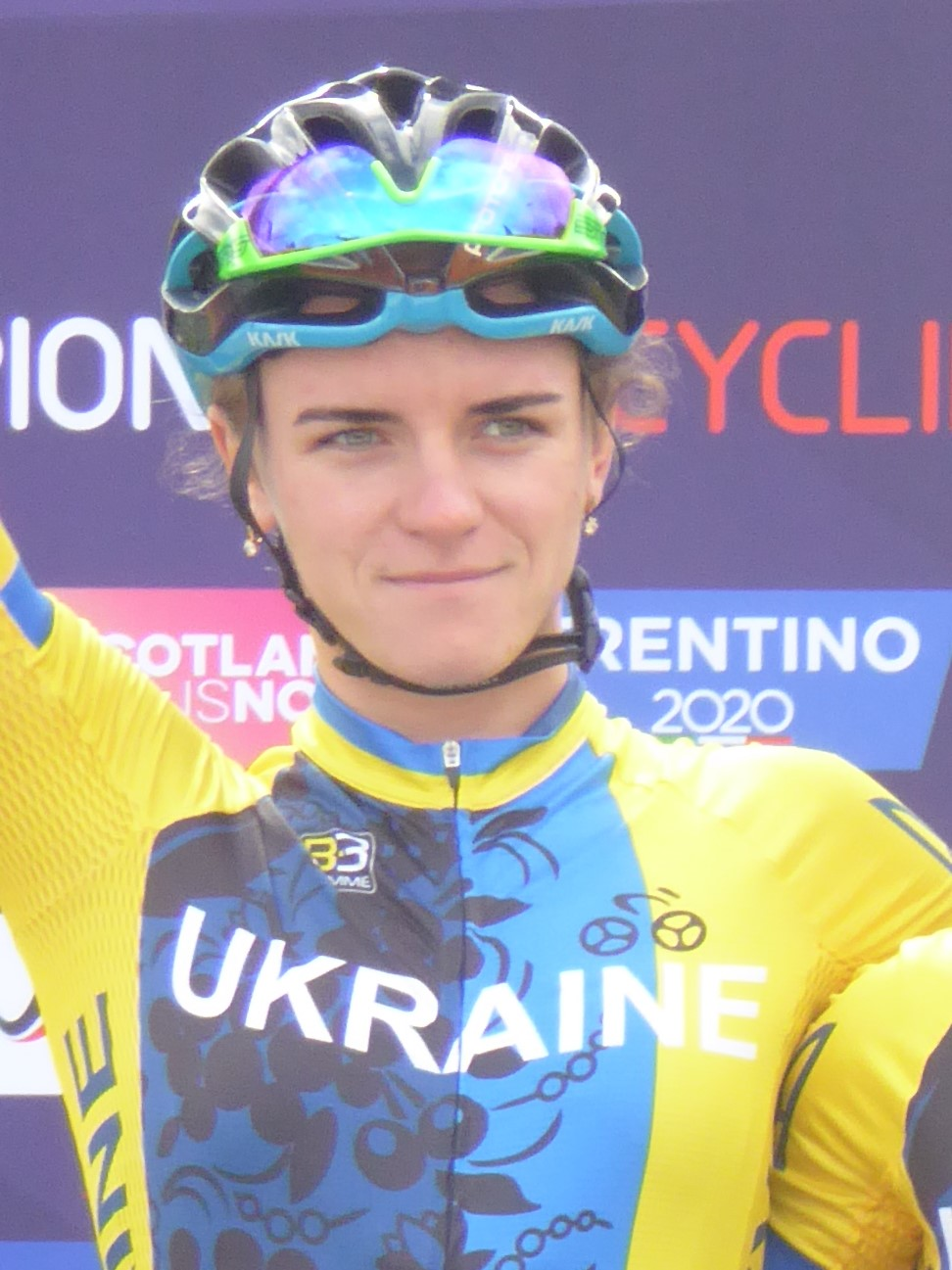
- Shekel at the 2018 European Road Cycling Championships.

Personal information
- Full name: Olga Shekel; Ukrainian: Ольга Шекель
- Born: 28 May 1994 (age 32) Ukraine

Cycling career
- Sport: Cycling
- Current team: A.R. Monex
- Discipline: Road
- Role: Rider
- Rider type: Time-trialist

Professional teams
- 2013: Chirio Forno d'Asolo
- 2016: Bizkaia–Durango
- 2018: S.C. Michela Fanini Rox
- 2019–2020: Astana
Medal record
Representing Ukraine
European Championships
Silver medal – second place	2015 Tartu	Time trial

Olga Shekel (Ukrainian: Ольга Шекель; born 28 May 1994) is a Ukrainian road racing cyclist, who currently rides for UCI Women's Continental Team A.R. Monex.

For the 2021 season, Shekel will join the Dubai Police team for its first season at UCI level.

== Career ==
She was a silver medalist in the under-23 time trial at the 2015 European Road Championships. A few days before the start, she was injured in a car crash. "I have suffered from pain all night, was nervous, but it is the most important that I am healthy. God has rewarded me for assiduity and sufferings. I am happy," – said she in an interview.

== Major results ==
2012
8th Time Trial, National Road Championships

2013
National Road Championships

10th Time Trial
10th Road Race

2015
2nd U23 Time Trial, European Road Championships
National Road Championships

4th Time Trial
4th Road Race

2017
2nd VR Women ITT
National Road Championships

3rd Road Race
7th Time Trial

9th Time Trial, European Road Championships

2018
National Road Championships

1st Road Race
3rd Time Trial

2nd Horizon Park Women Challenge
3rd VR Women ITT
5th Overall Tour of Eftalia Hotels and Velo Alanya
8th Overall Giro della Toscana Int. Femminile – Memorial Michela Fanini

2019
National Road Championships

1st Road Race
3rd Time Trial

1st Visegrad 4 Ladies Series Hungary
1st Chabany
2nd GP Alanya

2020
National Road Championships

1st Time Trial
2nd Road Race

1st Grand Prix Gazipaşa

2022
1st Grand Prix Gazipaşa
2nd Overall Princess Anna Vasa Tour
6th GP Mediterrennean
