= Ljubljana–Domžale–Ljubljana TT =

Slovenian one-day road cycling race

Race details
- Date: June
- Region: Slovenia
- Discipline: Road

History
- First edition: 2014
- Editions: 6 (as of 2019)
- First winner: Martina Ritter (AUT)
- Most wins: Ann-Sophie Duyck (BEL) (2 wins)
- Most recent: Marlen Reusser (SUI)

Ljubljana–Domžale–Ljubljana TT is an elite women's professional one-day road bicycle race held in Slovenia and is currently rated by the UCI as a 1.2 race.

== Past winners ==
Year	Country	Rider	Team
2014	Austria	Martina Ritter	BTC City Ljubljana
2015	Russia	Tatiana Antoshina	Servetto Footon
2016	Belgium	Ann-Sophie Duyck	Belgium (national team)
2017	Belgium	Ann-Sophie Duyck	Belgium (national team)
2018	Russia	Olga Zabelinskaya	Russia (national team)
2019	Switzerland	Marlen Reusser	Switzerland (national team)
2020	No race due to the COVID-19 pandemic in Slovenia		
2021	No race		
