= Sestroretsk (cycling team) =

Russian cycling team

Team information
- UCI code: SSK (2020–)
- Founded: 2020
- Discipline: Road
- Status: UCI Women's Continental Team (2020–)
- Bicycles: BMC (2020–)

Team name history
- 2020–: Sestroretsk

Sestroretsk is a Russian women's road bicycle racing team, established in 2020, which participates in elite women's races.

After the 2022 Russian invasion of Ukraine, the UCI said that Russian teams are forbidden from competing in international events.

== National champions ==
2021
Russia Road Race, Seda Krylova
