= Bizkaia–Durango =

Spanish cycling team

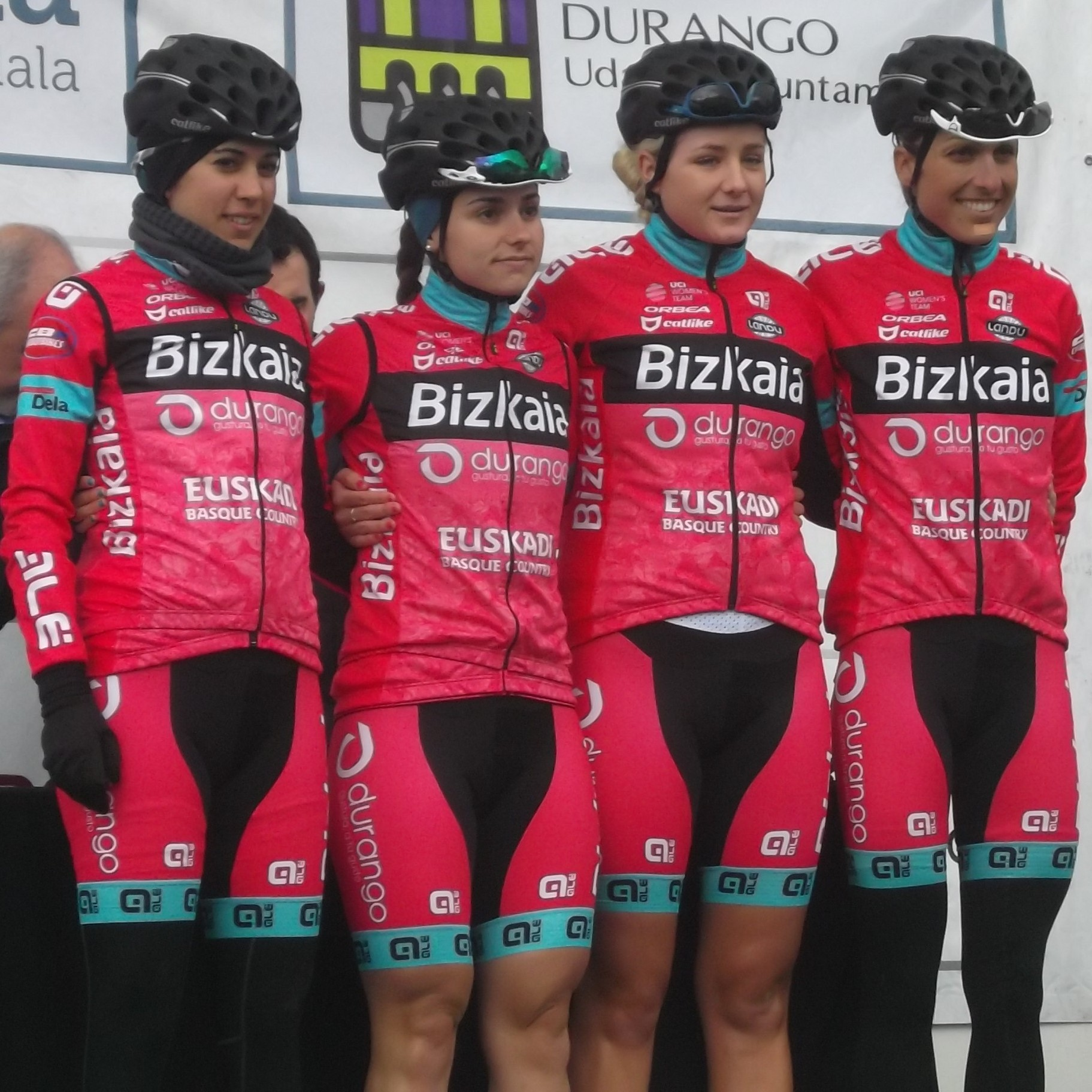

Team information
- UCI code: BDP (2004–2014, 2016–2017); BPD (2015); BDM (2018); BDU (2019–present)
- Registered: Spain
- Founded: 2004
- Disbanded: 2023
- Discipline: Road
- Status: UCI Women's Team (2005–2019); UCI Women's Continental Team (2020–2023)
- Bicycles: Beistegui Hermanos (BH)
- Website: Team home page

Key personnel
- General manager: Jon Elorriaga
- Team managers: Denis Gonzales, Agurtzane Elorriaga

Team name history
- 2004–2007 2008–2017 2018 2019–2023: Bizkaia–Panda Software–Durango (BDP); Bizkaia–Durango; Bizkaia Durango–Euskadi Murias (BDM); Bizkaia–Durango (BDU)

Bizkaia–Durango (UCI team code: BDU) was a women's professional road cycling team based in Spain that existed from 2004 to 2023.

== Team history ==
=== 2014 ===
Bizkaia–Durango was active during 2014 in women's road cycling. On October 30, current Brazilian National Time Trial champion, Márcia Fernandes, was suspended for two years for returning a positive doping test for EPO by the Brazilian cycling federation.

=== 2015 ===
For the 2015 season the team signed; Coral Casado, Elisabet Escursell, Paula Lanz and Alba Teruel. On November 22 the Lierni Lekuona, Lourdes Oyarbide and Ainara Sanz signed extensions with the team. On December 4, the team signed Samara Sheppard and offered extensions to Anna Ramírez, Mayalen Noriega and Dorleta Eskamendi.

=== 2016 ===
In 2016, the team was joined by Mauritian rider Kimberley Le Court, previously with British team Matrix Fitness Pro Cycling.

== Team roster ==
As of 18 January 2021.

Rider	Date of birth
Sandra Alonso (ESP)	19 August 1998 (age 28)
Yurani Blanco (ESP)	3 February 1998 (age 28)
Daniela Campos (POR)	31 March 2002 (age 24)
Émilie Fortin (CAN)	21 May 1999 (age 27)
Marina Garau (ESP)	15 September 2002 (age 23)
Ariana Gilabert (ESP)	12 April 2000 (age 26)
Nadine Gill (DEU)	19 April 1991 (age 35)
Lucía González Blanco (ESP)	9 July 1990 (age 36)

Rider	Date of birth
June Herrera (ESP)	18 November 2002 (age 23)
Lizzie Holden (GBR)	12 September 1997 (age 28)
Lydia Iglesias (ESP)	14 April 1997 (age 29)
Amaia Lartitegi (ESP)	12 March 2001 (age 25)
Irene Loizate (ESP)	17 May 1995 (age 31)
Irati Puigdefábregas (ESP)	24 September 2001 (age 24)
Julia Sánchez (ESP)	5 April 2002 (age 24)

== Major wins ==
2004
Stage 5 Tour de l'Aude Cycliste Féminin, Ghita Beltman
Durango-Durango Emakumeen Saria, Joane Somarriba
Overall Emakumeen Euskal Bira, Joane Somarriba

Stages 2, 3a & 3b, Joane Somarriba

2005
Overall & Stage 2b Trophée d'Or Féminin, Joane Somarriba
2006
Handzame, Emma Johansson
2007
Stage 5 Emakumeen Euskal Bira, Gema Pascual
Stage 2 La Route de France, Aran Azpiroz
2011
Stage 2 Giro Donne, Shara Gillow
2013
Bergara–Osintxu, Irene San Sebastian
2014
Grand Prix of Maykop, Yulia Ilinykh
Stage 2 Tour de San Luis, Clemilda Fernandes
2015
Stage 2 Tour of Adygeya, Elena Utrobina
Stages 2 & 3 Vuelta a Burgos Feminas, Yulia Ilinykh
Matiena-Abadiño, Yulia Ilinykh
Campeonato de Euskadi, Yulia Ilinykh
Zalla Road Race, Margarita Victoria García
2016
Overall Vuelta a Burgos Feminas, Margarita Victoria García

Stage 1, Margarita Victoria García

Gran Premio Comunidad de Cantabria, Margarita Victoria García
Trofeo Gobierno de La Rioja, Margarita Victoria García
Trofeo Ria de Marin, Margarita Victoria García
Zizurkil-Villabona Sari Nagusia, Margarita Victoria García
2017
Gran Premio Costa Blanca Calpe, Lourdes Oyarbide
Grand Premio Ciudad de Alcobendas, Lourdes Oyarbide
Stage 2 Vuelta a Burgos Feminas, Lourdes Oyarbide
Stage 4 Vuelta Internacional Femenina a Costa Rica, Paola Muñoz
Trofeo Iturmendi, Lourdes Oyarbide
Sopelana (Torneo Euskaldun), Lourdes Oyarbide
Tolosa, Lourdes Oyarbide
Overall Bestmed Jock Tour, Carla Oberholzer

Stages 2 & 3, Carla Oberholzer

Trofeo Gobierno de La Rioja, Margarita Victoria García
2018
Zeberio Cyclo-cross, Alice Maria Arzuffi
Zizurkil Cyclo-cross, Lucía González Blanco
Deba Cyclo-cross, Cristina Martínez
Lakuntza Cyclo-cross, Alice Maria Arzuffi
Kreiz Breizh Elites Dames, Dani Christmas
2019
Mountains classification Rás na mBan, Natalie Grinczer
Llodio Cyclo-cross, Lucía González Blanco
Elorrio Cyclo-cross, Lucía González Blanco
Les Franqueses del Vallès Cyclo-cross, Lucía González Blanco
Manlleu Cyclo-cross, Lucía González Blanco
Vic Cyclo-cross, Lucía González Blanco
Abadiano Cyclo-cross, Lucía González Blanco
Pontevedra Cyclo-cross, Lucía González Blanco
Ametzaga de Zuia Cyclo-cross, Lucía González Blanco
Igorre Cyclo-cross, Lucía González Blanco
Valencia Cyclo-cross, Lucía González Blanco
Coulounieix-Chamiers Cyclo-cross, Lucía González Blanco
2020
Sueca Cyclo-cross, Lucía González Blanco
Xàtiva Cyclo-cross, Lucía González Blanco
Valencia Cyclo-cross, Lucía González Blanco
2021
Stage 2 Setmana Ciclista Valenciana, Sandra Alonso
Les Franqueses del Vallès Cyclo-cross, Lucía González Blanco
Pontevedra Cyclo-cross, Lucía González Blanco
Marín Cyclo-cross, Lucía González Blanco
Karrantza Cyclo-cross, Lucía González Blanco
Xàtiva Cyclo-cross, Lucía González Blanco
Valencia Cyclo-cross, Lucía González Blanco

== National and continental champions ==
2009
Spain Time Trial, Gema Pascual Torrecilla
2010
Slovenia Road Race, Polona Batagelj
2011
Slovenia Road Race, Polona Batagelj
2012
Pan American Track (Points race), Paola Muñoz
Pan American Track (Scratch race), Lilibeth Chacón
Spain Time Trial, Anna Sanchis
Chile Time Trial, Paola Muñoz
Spain Road Race, Anna Sanchis
2013
Spain Time Trial, Anna Sanchis
Spain Road Race, Ane Santesteban
Slovenia Road Race, Polona Batagelj
2014
Spain Time Trial, Leire Olaberria
Hungary Time Trial, Veronika Anna Kormos
Spain Road Race, Anna Ramírez
Brazil Time Trial, Márcia Fernandes
2016
Spain Road Race, Margarita García
Mauritius Road Race, Kimberly Le Court de Billot
2017
Namibia Road Race, Vera Adrian
Namibia Time Trial, Vera Adrian
Spain Time Trial, Lourdes Oyarbide
Chile Time Trial, Paola Muñoz
2019
Spain U23 Cyclo-cross, Luisa Ibarrola
Japan Track (500m Time Trial), Miho Yoshikawa
Spain Track (Individual Pursuit), Sandra Alonso
Spain Track (Team Pursuit), Aroa Gorostiza
2020
Spain Cyclo-cross, Lucía González
2021
Spain Cyclo-cross, Lucía González
Portugal Time Trial, Daniela Campos
2022
Spain Cyclo-cross, Lucía González
Chile Time Trial, Catalina Soto Campos
Portugal Time Trial, Daniela Campos
Portugal Road Race, Daniela Campos
2023
Portugal U23 Time Trial, Beatriz Pereira
Brazil Road Race, Ana Vitória Magalhães
Mexico Time Trial, Andrea Ramírez
