= Grand Prix of Maykop =

Russian one-day road cycling race

Race details
- Date: May
- Region: Maykop, Russia
- Discipline: Road

History
- First edition: 2012
- Editions: 4
- Final edition: 2015
- First winner: Anastasia Chulkova (RUS)
- Most wins: No repeat winners
- Final winner: Anastasiia Iakovenko (RUS)

The Grand Prix of Maykop was an elite women's professional one-day road bicycle race held in Maykop, Russia, between 2012 and 2015. It was rated by the Union Cycliste Internationale (UCI) as a 1.2 race.

== Past winners ==
Year	Country	Rider	Team
2012	Russia	Anastasia Chulkova	
2013	Russia	Natalia Boyarskaya	
2014	Russia	Yulia Ilinykh	Bizkaia–Durango
2015	Russia	Anastasiia Iakovenko	
