= Grand Prix Gazipaşa (women's race) =

Grand Prix Gazipasa
Race details
- Date: February
- Discipline: Road
- Competition: UCI Europe Tour 1.2
- Type: One-day race
- Web site: grandprixgazipasa.com

History
- First edition: 2019
- Editions: 2 (as of 2020)
- First winner: Ina Savenka (BLR)
- Most wins: Olga Shekel (UKR) (2 wins)
- Most recent: Olga Shekel (UKR)

The Grand Prix Gazipasa is a cycling race held in Turkey and is rated as a 1.2 event.

== Winners ==
Year	Country	Rider	Team
2019	Belarus	Ina Savenka	Minsk Cycling Club
2020	Ukraine	Olga Shekel	Ukraine (national team)
2022	Ukraine	Olga Shekel	Ukraine (national team)
