= Tour of Adygeya =

Russian multi-day road cycling race

Race details
- Date: May (2012, 2014); June (2013, 2015); August (2021)
- Region: Russia
- Discipline: Road
- Type: Stage race

History
- First edition: 2012
- Editions: 5 (as of 2021)
- First winner: Alexandra Burchenkova (RUS)
- Most wins: Natalia Boyarskaya (RUS) (2 wins)
- Most recent: Galina Chernyshova (RUS)

Tour of Adygeya is a women's staged cycle race which takes place in Russia. Between 2012 and 2015, the race was rated by the Union Cycliste Internationale (UCI) as a 2.2 race.

== Winners ==
Year	Winner	Second	Third
2012	Alexandra Burchenkova (RUS)	Marina Likhanova (RUS)	Irina Molicheva (RUS)
2013	Natalia Boyarskaya (RUS)	Yevheniya Vysotska (UKR)	Anna Zavershinskaya (RUS)
2014	Natalia Boyarskaya (RUS)	Anna Zavershinskaya (RUS)	Tatiana Shamanova (RUS)
2015	Svetlana Vasilieva (RUS)	Anastasiia Iakovenko (RUS)	Natalia Boyarskaya (RUS)
2016– 2020	No race		
2021	Galina Chernyshova (RUS)	Seda Krylova (RUS)	Marina Uvarova (RUS)
