= 2014 UCI Road World Championships – Women's road race =

Women's road race
2014 UCI Road World Championships
- Rainbow jersey

Race details
- Dates: 27 September 2014
- Stages: 1 in (Spain) Ponferrada (ESP)
- Distance: 127.40 km (79.16 mi)
- Winning time: 3h 29' 21"

Medalists
	Gold	(France) Pauline Ferrand-Prévot (FRA)
	Silver	(Germany) Lisa Brennauer (DEU)
	Bronze	(Sweden) Emma Johansson (SWE)

The Women's road race of the 2014 UCI Road World Championships took place in and around Ponferrada, Spain on 27 September 2014. The course of the race was 127.40 km (79.16 mi) with the start and finish in Ponferrada. Marianne Vos was the defending champion, having won the world title in 2012 and 2013.

The world title was won by France's Pauline Ferrand-Prévot in a sprint finish, becoming the first French woman since Jeannie Longo in 1995 to win the women's world title. The silver medal went to Germany's Lisa Brennauer – the world time trial champion – having narrowly been beaten by Ferrand-Prévot in a photo finish, while Emma Johansson of Sweden won the bronze medal. Vos could only finish tenth in the race – the first time since the 2005 Championships that Vos had not won a medal – after her attack on the final climb (along with Johansson, Lizzie Armitstead and Elisa Longo Borghini) was negated in the closing kilometres, which led to a regrouping of 15 riders prior to the final sprint.

== Qualification ==
Qualification was based mainly on the 2014 UCI Nation Ranking as of 15 August 2014. The first five nations in this classification qualified seven riders to start, the next ten nations qualified six riders to start and the next five nations qualified five riders to start. Other nations and non ranked nations had the possibility to send three riders to start.

- Netherlands (7)
- Italy (7)
- United States (7)
- Sweden (7)
- Germany (7)
- United Kingdom (6)
- Russia (6)
- France (6)
- Belgium (6)
- Australia (6)
- Canada (6)
- Belarus (6)
- Brazil (6)
- New Zealand (6)
- Poland (6)
- South Africa (5)
- Switzerland (5)
- Ukraine (5)
- Norway (5)
- Venezuela (5)
- Other nations (3)

Moreover, the outgoing World Champion and continental champions were also able to take part in the race on top of the nation numbers.

Champion	Name	Note
Outgoing World Champion	Marianne Vos (NED)	
African Champion	Ashleigh Moolman (RSA)	
European Champion (under-23)	Sabrina Stultiens (NED)	
Pan American Champion	Arlenis Sierra (CUB)	Did not participate
Asian Champion	Hsiao Mei-yu (TPE)	Did not participate
Oceanian Champion	Jessica Allen (AUS)	Did not participate

== Course ==
The race was held on the same circuit as the other road races and consisted of seven laps. The circuit was 18.20 km (11.31 mi) long and included two hills. The total climbing was 306 m (1,004 ft) per lap and the maximum incline was 10.7%.

The first 4 km (2.5 mi) were flat, after which the climb to Alto de Montearenas started, with an average gradient of 8%. After a few hundred metres the ascent flattened and the remaining 5.1 km (3.2 mi) were at an average gradient of 3.5%. Next was a descent, with the steepest point after 11 km (6.8 mi) at a 16% negative gradient.

The Alto de Compostilla was a short climb of 1.1 km (0.68 mi), at an average gradient is 6.5% with some of the steepest parts at 11%. The remaining distance of 4.5 km (2.8 mi) was downhill thereafter, prior to the finish in Ponferrada.

== Schedule ==
All times are in Central European Time (UTC+1).

Date	Time	Event
27 September 2014	14:00–17:20	Women's road race
27 September 2014	17:40	Victory ceremony

== Participating nations ==
134 cyclists from 39 nations took part in the women's road race. The numbers of cyclists per nation are shown in parentheses.

- Australia (6)
- Austria (2)
- Belgium (6)
- Belarus (2)
- Brazil (3)
- Canada (4)
- Colombia (2)
- Croatia (2)
- Czech Republic (1)
- Denmark (1)
- Estonia (2)
- Finland (2)
- France (6)
- Germany (7)
- (United Kingdom) Great Britain (6)
- Greece (1)
- Hungary (2)
- Israel (2)
- Italy (7)
- Japan (2)
- Latvia (2)
- Lithuania (3)
- Luxembourg (1)
- Mexico (2)
- Netherlands (9)
- New Zealand (4)
- Norway (3)
- Poland (6)
- Portugal (1)
- Romania (1)
- Russia (6)
- Saint Kitts and Nevis (1)
- Slovenia (3)
- South Africa (3)
- Spain (3) (host)
- Sweden (6)
- Switzerland (5)
- Ukraine (2)
- United States (7)

== Prize money ==
The UCI assigned premiums for the top 3 finishers, with a total prize money of €16,101.

Position	1st	2nd	3rd	Total
Amount	€7,667	€5,367	€3,067	€16,101

== Results ==
Of the race's 134 entrants, 59 riders completed the full distance of 127.4 kilometres (79.2 mi).

Rank	Rider	Country	Time
1	Pauline Ferrand-Prévot	France	3h 29' 21"
2	Lisa Brennauer	Germany	+ 0"
3	Emma Johansson	Sweden	+ 0"
4	Giorgia Bronzini	Italy	+ 0"
5	Tiffany Cromwell	Australia	+ 0"
6	Shelley Olds	United States	+ 0"
7	Lizzie Armitstead	United Kingdom	+ 0"
8	Linda Villumsen	New Zealand	+ 0"
9	Hanna Solovey	Ukraine	+ 0"
10	Marianne Vos	Netherlands	+ 0"
11	Katarzyna Niewiadoma	Poland	+ 0"
12	Evelyn Stevens	United States	+ 3"
13	Rossella Ratto	Italy	+ 3"
14	Elisa Longo Borghini	Italy	+ 3"
15	Claudia Lichtenberg	Germany	+ 6"
16	Audrey Cordon	France	+ 41"
17	Chantal Blaak	Netherlands	+ 41"
18	Paulina Brzeźna-Bentkowska	Poland	+ 41"
19	Małgorzata Jasińska	Poland	+ 41"
20	Ashleigh Moolman	South Africa	+ 41"
21	Elena Kuchinskaya	Russia	+ 41"
22	Eri Yonamine	Japan	+ 41"
23	Doris Schweizer	Switzerland	+ 41"
24	Rachel Neylan	Australia	+ 41"
25	Flávia Oliveira	Brazil	+ 41"
26	Anna Sanchis	Spain	+ 41"
27	Sofie De Vuyst	Belgium	+ 47"
28	Tatyana Riabchenko	Ukraine	+ 47"
29	Ellen van Dijk	Netherlands	+ 47"
30	Ane Santesteban	Spain	+ 47"
31	Christine Majerus	Luxembourg	+ 47"
32	Trixi Worrack	Germany	+ 47"
33	Lucinda Brand	Netherlands	+ 47"
34	Kelly Druyts	Belgium	+ 1' 10"
35	Sérika Gulumá	Colombia	+ 1' 10"
36	Jessenia Meneses	Colombia	+ 1' 24"
37	Tatiana Guderzo	Italy	+ 2' 41"
38	Annie Last	United Kingdom	+ 3' 06"
39	Julie Leth	Denmark	+ 3' 06"
40	Maaike Polspoel	Belgium	+ 3' 06"
41	Lauren Hall	United States	+ 5' 30"
42	Emilie Moberg	Norway	+ 5' 46"
43	Élise Delzenne	France	+ 5' 46"
44	Amélie Rivat	France	+ 5' 46"
45	Polona Batagelj	Slovenia	+ 5' 46"
46	Špela Kern	Slovenia	+ 5' 46"
47	Megan Guarnier	United States	+ 5' 46"
48	Katrin Garfoot	Australia	+ 5' 46"
49	Sara Mustonen	Sweden	+ 5' 51"
50	Alexandra Burchenkova	Russia	+ 5' 51"
51	Anastasia Chulkova	Russia	+ 5' 51"
52	Mayuko Hagiwara	Japan	+ 5' 51"
53	Charlotte Becker	Germany	+ 5' 51"
54	Sari Saarelainen	Finland	+ 8' 38"
55	Elena Cecchini	Italy	+ 8' 45"
56	Sabrina Stultiens	Netherlands	+ 11' 06"
57	Carlee Taylor	Australia	+ 11' 44"
58	Verónica Leal	Mexico	+ 11' 44"
59	Paz Bash	Israel	+ 12' 28"

Rider	Country	Time
Uênia Fernandes de Souza	Brazil	DNF
An-Li Kachelhoffer	South Africa	DNF
Anna Christian	United Kingdom	DNF
Stephanie Pohl	Germany	DNF
Hannah Barnes	United Kingdom	DNF
Susanna Zorzi	Italy	DNF
Alison Powers	United States	DNF
Amy Pieters	Netherlands	DNF
Iris Slappendel	Netherlands	DNF
Sara Olsson	Sweden	DNF
Valentina Scandolara	Italy	DNF
Daiva Tušlaitė	Lithuania	DNF
Lija Laizāne	Latvia	DNF
Kataržina Sosna	Lithuania	DNF
Jacqueline Hahn	Austria	DNF
Ewelina Szybiak	Poland	DNF
Désirée Ehrler	Switzerland	DNF
Tatiana Antoshina	Russia	DNF
Emilia Fahlin	Sweden	DNF
Tayler Wiles	United States	DNF
Lotta Lepistö	Finland	DNF
Joanne Kiesanowski	New Zealand	DNF
Eline Gleditsch Brustad	Norway	DNF
Aude Biannic	France	DNF
Romy Kasper	Germany	DNF
Loren Rowney	Australia	DNF
Ksenyia Tuhai	Belarus	DNF
Émilie Aubry	Switzerland	DNF
Lex Albrecht	Canada	DNF
Nicole Hanselmann	Switzerland	DNF
Martina Ritter	Austria	DNF
Linda Indergand	Switzerland	DNF
Linnea Sjöblom	Sweden	DNF
Reta Trotman	New Zealand	DNF
Dana Rožlapa	Latvia	DNF
Kathryn Bertine	Saint Kitts and Nevis	DNF
Liisa Ehrberg	Estonia	DNF
Daniela Reis	Portugal	DNF
Mia Radotić	Croatia	DNF
Varvara Fasoi	Greece	DNF
Alice Barnes	United Kingdom	DNF
Lucy Garner	United Kingdom	DNF
Corinna Lechner	Germany	DNF
Eugénie Duval	France	DNF
Lavinia Rolea	Romania	DNF
Alena Amialiusik	Belarus	DNF
Eugenia Bujak	Poland	DNF
Roxane Knetemann	Netherlands	DNF
Heidi Dalton	South Africa	DNF
Antonela Ferenčić	Croatia	DNF
Milda Jankauskaitė	Lithuania	DNF
Ana Teresa Casas	Mexico	DNF
Veronika Kormos	Hungary	DNF
Liisi Rist	Estonia	DNF
Diána Szurominé Pulsfort	Hungary	DNF
Shani Bloch	Israel	DNF
Urša Pintar	Slovenia	DNF
Alexandra Nessmar	Sweden	DNF
Annelies Van Doorslaer	Belgium	DNF
Miriam Bjørnsrud	Norway	DNF
Jessie Daams	Belgium	DNF
Oxana Kozonchuk	Russia	DNF
Anna Plichta	Poland	DNF
Joëlle Numainville	Canada	DNF
Lizzie Williams	Australia	DNF
Ann-Sophie Duyck	Belgium	DNF
Leah Kirchmann	Canada	DNF
Thalita de Jong	Netherlands	DNF
Mara Abbott	United States	DNF
Karol-Ann Canuel	Canada	DNF
Anastasiia Iakovenko	Russia	DNF
Martina Sáblíková	Czech Republic	DNF
Sheyla Gutiérrez	Spain	DNF
Emily Collins	New Zealand	DNF
Clemilda Fernandes	Brazil	DNF
