= 2014 UCI Road World Championships – Women's team time trial =

Women's team time trial
2014 UCI Road World Championships

Race details
- Dates: 21 September 2014
- Stages: 1
- Distance: 36.15 km (22.46 mi)
- Winning time: 43' 33.35"

Medalists
| | Gold | Specialized–lululemon (USA) |
| | Silver | Orica–AIS (AUS) |
| | Bronze | Astana BePink (ITA) |

The Women's team time trial of the 2014 UCI Road World Championships took place in and around Ponferrada, Spain on 21 September 2014. The course of the race was 36.15 km (22.46 mi) with the start and finish in Ponferrada. It was the third edition of the team time trial event for UCI Women's Teams. Specialized–lululemon was the defending champion, having won both previous editions in 2012 and 2013.

Specialized–lululemon once again won the world title, finishing over a minute clear of their closest competitors, Orica–AIS. The bronze medal went to Astana BePink, after Rabobank-Liv Woman Cycling Team were severely delayed because of an incident that caused several members of the team to hit the ground.

== Qualification ==
Invitations were sent to the 25 leading UCI Women's Teams in the UCI Team Ranking as of 15 August 2014. Teams that accepted the invitation within the deadline had the right to participate. Every participating team had the opportunity to register nine riders from its team roster, with the exception of stagiaires, and had to select six riders to compete in the event.

Teams that did not accept the invitation are listed below in italics.

Top 25 as of 15 August 2014

| # | Nat | Team |
|---|---|---|
| 1 | (Netherlands) | Rabobank-Liv Woman Cycling Team |
| 2 | (Netherlands) | Boels–Dolmans |
| 3 | (Australia) | Orica–AIS |
| 4 | (Netherlands) | Giant–Shimano |
| 5 | (United States) | Specialized–lululemon |
| 6 | (United Kingdom) | Wiggle–Honda |
| 7 | (Norway) | Hitec Products |
| 8 | (Russia) | RusVelo |
| 9 | (Italy) | Alé Cipollini |
| 10 | (Italy) | Astana BePink Women's Team |
| 11 | (Mexico) | Estado de México-Faren |
| 12 | (Belgium) | Lotto–Belisol Ladies |
| 13 | (United States) | UnitedHealthcare |
| 14 | (United States) | Optum p/b Kelly Benefit Strategies |
| 15 | (Italy) | Servetto Footon |
| 16 | (Switzerland) | Bigla Cycling Team |
| 17 | (Slovenia) | BTC City Ljubljana |
| 18 | (Italy) | S.C. Michela Fanini Rox |
| 19 | (United States) | TIBCO–To The Top |
| 20 | (Netherlands) | Futurumshop.nl–Zannata |
| 21 | (France) | Poitou–Charentes.Futuroscope.86 |
| 22 | (Spain) | Lointek |
| 23 | (Spain) | Bizkaia–Durango |
| 24 | (Belgium) | Topsport Vlaanderen–Pro-Duo |
| 25 | (Italy) | Top Girls Fassa Bortolo |

== Course ==
The course for the women's team time trial was 36.15 km (22.46 mi) in length. The team time trial started in the centre of Ponferrada and passed through La Martina, Posada del Bierzo, Carracedelo and Cacabelos before returning to Ponferrada. The total elevation of the course was 198 m (650 ft). A few kilometres before the finish there was a climb with an incline of over 100 m (330 ft) and a maximum inclination of 7%. A short stretch before riding into Ponferrada was made for the championships.

== Schedule ==
All times are in Central European Time (UTC+1).

| Date | Time | Event |
|---|---|---|
| 21 September 2014 | 10:00–11:25 | Women's team time trial |
| 21 September 2014 | 11:45 | Victory ceremony |

== Prize money ==
The UCI assigned premiums for the top 5 finishers with a total prize money of €49,531.

| Position | 1st | 2nd | 3rd | 4th | 5th | Total |
| Amount | €10,666 | €6,666 | €4,166 | €2,500 | €1,666 | €49,531 |

== Final classification ==
| Rank | Team | Riders | Time |
|---|---|---|---|
| 1 | (United States) Specialized–lululemon | Chantal Blaak (NED); Lisa Brennauer (DEU); Karol-Ann Canuel (CAN); Carmen Small (USA); Evelyn Stevens (USA); Trixi Worrack (DEU) | 43' 33.35" |
| 2 | (Australia) Orica–AIS | Annette Edmondson (AUS); Melissa Hoskins (AUS); Emma Johansson (SWE); Jessie MacLean (AUS); Valentina Scandolara (ITA); Amanda Spratt (AUS) | + 1' 17.56" |
| 3 | (Italy) Astana BePink | Alena Amialiusik (BLR); Simona Frapporti (ITA); Doris Schweizer (SUI); Alison Tetrick (USA); Silvia Valsecchi (ITA); Susanna Zorzi (ITA) | + 2' 19.64" |
| 4 | (United States) Optum p/b Kelly Benefit Strategies | Annie Ewart (CAN); Lauren Hall (USA); Janel Holcomb (USA); Leah Kirchmann (CAN); Brianna Walle (USA); Jade Wilcoxson (USA) | + 2' 25.75" |
| 5 | (Netherlands) Boels–Dolmans | Lizzie Armitstead (GBR); Jessie Daams (BEL); Romy Kasper (DEU); Christine Majerus (LUX); Katarzyna Pawłowska (POL); Ellen van Dijk (NED) | + 2' 26.33" |
| 6 | (United States) UnitedHealthcare | Rushlee Buchanan (NZL); Cari Higgins (CAN); Sharon Laws (GBR); Alison Powers (USA); Lauren Tamayo (USA); Ruth Winder (USA) | + 2' 43.80" |
| 7 | (Switzerland) Bigla Cycling Team | Elke Gebhardt (DEU); Jacqueline Hahn (AUT); Nicole Hanselmann (SUI); Taryn Heather (AUS); Vera Koedooder (NED); Lotta Lepistö (FIN) | + 2' 55.54" |
| 8 | (Netherlands) Giant–Shimano | Marijn de Vries (NED); Claudia Lichtenberg (DEU); Floortje Mackaij (NED); Sara Mustonen (SWE); Amy Pieters (NED); Maaike Polspoel (BEL) | + 3' 45.05" |
| 9 | (Norway) Hitec Products | Miriam Bjørnsrud (NOR); Vita Heine (NOR); Cecilie Gotaas Johnsen (NOR); Julie Leth (DEN); Emilie Moberg (NOR); Sara Olsson (SWE) | + 4' 01.38" |
| 10 | (Russia) RusVelo | Tatiana Antoshina (RUS); Alexandra Burchenkova (RUS); Anastasia Chulkova (RUS); Oxana Kozonchuk (RUS); Elena Kuchinskaya (RUS); Maria Savitskaya (RUS) | + 4' 07.66" |
| 11 | (United States) TIBCO–To The Top | Joanne Kiesanowski (NZL); Amanda Miller (USA); Kendall Ryan (USA); Patricia Schwager (SUI); Lauren Stephens (USA); Anika Todd (CAN) | + 4' 10.25" |
| 12 | (Slovenia) BTC City Ljubljana | Polona Batagelj (SLO); Eugenia Bujak (POL); Urša Pintar (SLO); Mia Radotić (CRO); Martina Ritter (AUT); Elena Valentini (ITA) | + 4' 19.93" |
| 13 | (Belgium) Topsport Vlaanderen–Pro-Duo | Gilke Croket (BEL); Nel de Crits (BEL); Demmy Druyts (BEL); Kelly Druyts (BEL); Lotte Kopecky (BEL); Kelly Van den Steen (BEL) | + 5' 45.82" |
| 14 | (Netherlands) Rabobank-Liv Woman Cycling Team | Lucinda Brand (NED); Pauline Ferrand-Prévot (FRA); Roxane Knetemann (NED); Anna van der Breggen (NED); Annemiek van Vleuten (NED); Marianne Vos (NED) | + 10' 05.32" |
