= 2013 UCI Women's Road World Rankings =

The 2013 UCI Women's Road Rankings is an overview of the UCI Women's Road Rankings, based upon the results in all UCI-sanctioned races of the 2013 women's road cycling season.

== Summary ==
Top-ranked individual	Second-ranked individual	Third-ranked individual	Top-ranked team	Top-ranked nation
Emma Johansson (SWE); Orica–AIS	Marianne Vos (NED); Rabobank-Liv Giant	Ellen van Dijk (NED); Specialized–lululemon	Orica–AIS	Netherlands

Final results.

== Individual World Ranking (top 100) ==
	Cyclists	Nation	Team	Age	Points
1	Emma Johansson	Sweden	GEW	30	1388
2	Marianne Vos	Netherlands	RBW	26	1296.75
3	Ellen van Dijk	Netherlands	SLU	26	924
4	Giorgia Bronzini	Italy	WHT	30	614
5	Anna van der Breggen	Netherlands	SLT	23	540.5
6	Elisa Longo Borghini	Italy	HPU	22	531.58
7	Evelyn Stevens	United States	SLU	30	527
8	Kirsten Wild	Netherlands	ARW	31	370
9	Tatiana Antoshina	Russia	MCG	31	361
10	Rossella Ratto	Italy	HPU	20	336.08
11	Tatiana Guderzo	Italy	MCG	29	328
12	Linda Melanie Villumsen	New Zealand	WHT	28	324.5
13	Shelley Olds	United States	TIB	33	317.25
14	Alena Amialiusik	Belarus	BPK	24	317
15	Annemiek van Vleuten	Netherlands	RBW	31	311.25
16	Claudia Häusler	Germany	TIB	28	278.5
17	Elizabeth Armitstead	Great Britain	DLT	25	272.5
18	Noemi Cantele	Italy	BPK	32	260
19	Chloe Hosking	Australia	HPU	23	254.25
20	Tiffany Cromwell	Australia	GEW	25	253
21	Lisa Brennauer	Germany	SLU	25	244
22	Trixi Worrack	Germany	SLU	32	237
23	Katarzyna Pawłowska	Poland	GKS	24	232
24	Carmen Small	United States	SLU	33	231
25	Shara Gillow	Australia	GEW	26	205
26	Lucinda Brand	Netherlands	RBW	24	203.75
27	Ashleigh Moolman	South Africa	LBL	28	200
28	Joëlle Numainville	Canada	OPW	26	194
29	Christine Majerus	Luxembourg	SLT	26	191.25
30	Clemilda Fernandes Silva	Brazil	FCL	34	182.25
31	Amy Pieters	Netherlands	ARW	22	174
32	Maaike Polspoel	Belgium	SLT	24	156.25
33	Inga Čilvinaitė	Lithuania	PZC	27	154.5
34	Loes Gunnewijk	Netherlands	GEW	33	152.5
35	Oxana Kozonchuk	Russia	RVL	25	148
36	Francesca Cauz	Italy	TOG	21	142.33
37	Pauline Ferrand-Prévot	France	RBW	21	137
38	Tetyana Ryabchenko	Ukraine	FCL	24	131
39	Emma Pooley	Great Britain		31	127
40	Natalia Boyarskaya	Russia	TPW	30	126
41	Lorena María Vargas Villamil	Colombia	PZC	27	124
42	Vera Koedooder	Netherlands	SLT	30	123.5
43	Marta Tagliaferro	Italy	MCG	24	121
44	Valentina Scandolara	Italy	MCG	23	119
45	Hanna Solovey	Ukraine		21	118
46	Elena Kuchinskaya	Russia	RVL	29	113
47	Jolien D'Hoore	Belgium	LBL	23	112
48	Annette Edmondson	Australia	GEW	22	111.5
49	Chantal Blaak	Netherlands	TIB	24	109.25
50	Mara Abbott	United States	EXG	28	106
51	Karol-Ann Canuel	Canada	FUT	25	104
52	Megan Guarnier	United States	RBW	28	103.5
53	Liesbet De Vocht	Belgium	RBW	34	102.5
54	Amanda Spratt	Australia	GEW	26	98
55	Lauren Hall	United States	OPW	34	94
56	Gracie Elvin	Australia	GEW	25	91.5
57	Audrey Cordon	France	FUT	24	91
58	Amy Cure	Australia		21	90.5
59	Adrie Visser	Netherlands	DLT	30	86.5
60	Susanna Zorzi	Italy	FLF	21	83
61	Thalita de Jong	Netherlands	RBW	20	82.75
62	Arlenis Sierra Cañadilla	Cuba		21	80
63	Mei Yu Hsiao	Chinese Taipei		28	79
64	Evelyn García	El Salvador	PZC	31	77.5
65	Eivgenia Vysotska	Ukraine	MIC	38	76
66	Lucy Garner	Great Britain	ARW	19	75
67	Marta Bastianelli	Italy	FLF	26	74
68	Svetlana Stolbova	Russia	TPW	40	73
69	Silvia Valsecchi	Italy	BPK	31	73
70	Addyson Albershardt	United States	PZC	19	73
71	Roxane Knetemann	Netherlands	RBW	26	72
72	Olga Zabelinskaya	Russia	RVL	33	70
73	Sérika Gulumá Ortiz	Colombia	VAI	23	69
74	Edwige Pitel	France	MIC	46	69
75	Lauren Kitchen	Australia	WHT	23	66.5
76	Iris Slappendel	Netherlands	RBW	28	65.5
77	Alexandra Burchenkova	Russia	RVL	25	65
78	Íngrid Drexel	Mexico	PZC	20	63
79	Jessie Daams	Belgium	DLT	23	61.5
80	Sara Mustonen	Sweden	FLF	32	61
81	Dalia Muccioli	Italy	BPK	20	59
82	Aude Biannic	France	MIC	22	59
83	Sofie De Vuyst	Belgium	SLT	26	58.25
84	Anastasia Chulkova	Russia	RVL	28	57
85	Ana Sanabria	Colombia		23	57
86	Fabiana Luperini	Italy	FLF	39	56.5
87	Marlies Mejías Garcia	Cuba		21	56
88	Élise Delzenne	France	BCF	24	55
89	Emily Collins	New Zealand	WHT	23	55
90	Elke Gebhardt	Germany	ARW	30	54
91	Paulina Brzeźna	Poland		32	53
92	Huang Ting Ying	Chinese Taipei		23	50
93	Amber Neben	United States	PZC	38	50
94	Cecilie Gotaas Johnsen	Norway	HPU	37	49.83
95	Laura Trott	Great Britain	WHT	21	49
96	Martine Bras	Netherlands	DLT	35	48
97	Márcia Fernandes Silva	Brazil		22	47.25
98	Thuy Dung Nguyen	Vietnam		23	47
99	Emilia Fahlin	Sweden	HPU	25	46.5
100	Georgia Williams	New Zealand	BPK	20	46

Final results.

== UCI Teams Ranking ==
This is the ranking of the UCI women's teams from 2013.

	Team	Nation	Points
1	Orica–AIS	Australia	2138.5
2	Specialized–lululemon	United States	2132
3	Rabobank-Liv Giant	Netherlands	2118.75
4	Hitec Products UCK	Norway	1171.74
5	Wiggle–Honda	Great Britain	1170
6	Sengers Ladies Cycling Team	Belgium	1019.5
7	MCipollini–Giordana	Italy	1049
8	Team Argos–Shimano	Netherlands	773
9	Team TIBCO–To The Top	United States	720
10	BePink	Italy	709
11	Boels–Dolmans Cycling Team	Netherlands	538.5
12	RusVelo	Russia	526
13	Optum p/b Kelly Benefit Strategies	United States	449
14	Pasta Zara–Cogeas	Lithuania	429
15	Lotto–Belisol Ladies	Belgium	365
16	Chirio Forno D'Asolo	Lithuania	349.5
17	Faren Kuota	Italy	274.5
18	GSD Gestion-Kallisto	Canada	259
19	Vienne Futuroscope	France	258
20	S.C. Michela Fanini-Rox	Italy	229
21	Team Pratomagno Women	Uzbekistan	206
22	Top Girls Fassa Bortolo	Italy	180.66
23	Exergy Twenty16	United States	178
24	Vaiano Fondriest	Italy	124
25	China Chongming–Giant Pro Cycling	Hong Kong, China	110
26	Lointek	Spain	86
27	Bizkaia–Durango	Spain	73.25
28	Bourgogne–Pro Dialog	France	58
29	Topsport Vlaanderen–Bioracer	Belgium	51
30	Cyclelive Plus–Zannata	Belgium	50
31	Squadra Scappatella	Austria	47
32	Cramo Go:Green	Sweden	32
33	Team Futurumshop.nl	Netherlands	31
34	Servetto Footon	Italy	9

Final results.

== Nations Ranking ==
	Nation	Code	Points
1	Netherlands	NED	3442.5
2	Italy	ITA	2069.66
3	Sweden	SWE	1523.5
4	United States	USA	1284.75
5	Australia	AUS	921.75
6	Germany	GER	857.5
7	Russia	RUS	821
8	Great Britain	GBR	555
9	Belgium	BEL	490.5
10	New Zealand	NZL	450.5
11	France	FRA	411
12	Canada	CAN	406
13	Ukraine	UKR	348
14	Poland	POL	346.5
15	Belarus	BLR	326
16	Brazil	BRA	277.75
17	Colombia	COL	264
18	South Africa	RSA	210
19	Luxembourg	LUX	208.25
20	Lithuania	LTU	195.5
21	Cuba	CUB	136
22	Chinese Taipei	TPE	129
23	Mexico	MEX	100
24	El Salvador	ESA	99.5
25	Norway	NOR	89.58
26	Venezuela	VEN	85.75
27	China	CHN	80
28	Czech Republic	CZE	73
29	Vietnam	VIE	65
30	Hong Kong, China	HKG	64
31	Thailand	THA	63
32	Costa Rica	CRC	61
33	Austria	AUT	60
34	Switzerland	SUI	59.5
35	Japan	JPN	54
36	Denmark	DEN	51.5
37	Spain	ESP	50
38	Korea	KOR	47
39	Estonia	EST	39
40	Slovenia	SLO	34
41	Finland	FIN	32
42	Indonesia	INA	32
43	Guatemala	GUA	30
43	Eritrea	ERI	30
43	Puerto Rico	PUR	30
43	Malaysia	MAS	30
43	Ireland	IRL	30
43	Greece	GRE	30
43	Hungary	HUN	30
43	Croatia	CRO	30
43	Romania	ROU	30
43	Israel	ISR	30
53	Serbia	SRB	22
53	Algeria	ALG	22
53	Lesotho	LES	22
56	Zimbabwe	ZIM	20
56	Belize	BIZ	20
58	Bosnia & Herzegovina	BIH	20
59	Guam	GUM	20
60	Aruba	ARU	15
61	Morocco	MAR	13
62	Mongolia	MGL	12
63	Bermuda	BER	5
63	Latvia	LAT	5
65	Chile	CHI	5

Final results.

Preceded by 2012	UCI Women's Road Rankings; 2013	Succeeded by 2014
