= 2014 UCI Women's Road World Rankings =

The 2014 UCI Women's Road Rankings is an overview of the UCI Women's Road Rankings, based upon the results in all UCI-sanctioned races of the 2014 women's road cycling season.

== Summary ==
Top-ranked individual	Second-ranked individual	Third-ranked individual	Top-ranked team	Top-ranked nation
Marianne Vos (NED); Rabobank-Liv Woman Cycling Team	Emma Johansson (SWE); Orica–AIS	Lizzie Armitstead (GBR); Boels–Dolmans	Rabobank-Liv Woman Cycling Team	Netherlands

Final ranking.

== Individual World Ranking (top 100) ==
Final ranking 2014

	Cyclists	Nation	Team	Age	Points
1	Marianne Vos	Netherlands	RBW	27	1363
2	Emma Johansson	Sweden	GEW	31	1315
3	Lizzie Armitstead	Great Britain	DLT	26	923.25
4	Kirsten Wild	Netherlands	GIW	32	877.25
5	Lisa Brennauer	Germany	SLU	26	846
6	Giorgia Bronzini	Italy	WHT	31	845
7	Anna van der Breggen	Netherlands	RBW	24	839
8	Pauline Ferrand-Prévot	France	RBW	22	815
9	Shelley Olds	United States	ALE	34	792
10	Alena Amialiusik	Belarus	BPK	25	632
11	Elisa Longo Borghini	Italy	HPU	23	624
12	Ellen van Dijk	Netherlands	DLT	27	576.25
13	Evelyn Stevens	United States	SLU	31	560
14	Jolien D'Hoore	Belgium	LBL	24	463
15	Amy Pieters	Netherlands	GIW	23	417.5
16	Olga Zabelinskaya	Russia	RVL	34	412
17	Annemiek van Vleuten	Netherlands	RBW	32	405.75
18	Rossella Ratto	Italy	EMF	21	381
19	Elena Cecchini	Italy	EMF	22	377
20	Claudia Lichtenberg	Germany	GIW	29	366.25
21	Mara Abbott	United States	UHC	29	352
22	Chantal Blaak	Netherlands	SLU	25	322
23	Flávia Oliveira	Brazil		33	321
24	Hanna Solovey	Ukraine		22	310
25	Tiffany Cromwell	Australia	SLU	26	302
26	Megan Guarnier	United States	DLT	29	297.25
27	Ashleigh Moolman-Pasio	South Africa	HPU	29	285.25
28	Trixi Worrack	Germany	SLU	33	254
29	Audrey Cordon	France	HPU	25	251
30	Lucinda Brand	Netherlands	RBW	25	249.75
31	Linda Melanie Villumsen	New Zealand	WHT	29	219
32	Leah Kirchmann	Canada	OPW	24	216
33	Thalita de Jong	Netherlands	RBW	21	202.75
34	Roxane Knetemann	Netherlands	RBW	27	192.75
35	Katarzyna Niewiadoma	Poland	RBW	20	192
36	Sharon Laws	Great Britain	UHC	40	189
37	Christine Majerus	Luxembourg	DLT	27	185.25
38	Barbara Guarischi	Italy	ALE	24	183
39	Eugenia Bujak	Poland	BTC	25	169
40	Melissa Hoskins	Australia	GEW	23	164.5
41	Lucy Garner	Great Britain	GIW	20	163
42	Doris Schweizer	Switzerland	BPK	25	162
43	Charlotte Becker	Germany	WHT	31	158
44	Liesbet De Vocht	Belgium	LBL	35	158
45	Chloe Hosking	Australia	HPU	24	156.25
46	Sabrina Stultiens	Netherlands	RBW	21	156
47	Katrin Garfoot	Australia	GEW	33	151
48	Vera Koedooder	Netherlands	BCT	31	149
49	Ann-Sophie Duyck	Belgium		27	138
50	Lauren Hall	United States	OPW	35	131
51	Lotta Lepistö	Finland	BCT	25	128
52	Lizzie Williams	Australia		31	126
53	Valentina Scandolara	Italy	GEW	24	125
54	Elena Kuchinskaya	Russia	RVL	30	123
55	Tayler Wiles	United States	SLU	25	122
56	Susanna Zorzi	Italy	BPK	22	122
57	Aude Biannic	France	LKT	23	121
58	Emilie Moberg	Norway	HPU	23	118
59	Sofie De Vuyst	Belgium	FTZ	27	117.75
60	Maaike Polspoel	Belgium	GIW	25	114.25
61	Tetyana Ryabchenko	Ukraine	MIC	25	114
62	Kelly Druyts	Belgium	VLL	25	113
63	Emma Pooley	Great Britain	LBL	32	109
64	Arlenis Sierra Cañadilla	Cuba		22	108
65	Roxane Fournier	France	FUT	23	107
66	Martina Ritter	Austria	BTC	32	106
67	Elena Berlato	Italy	ALE	26	105
68	Lex Albrecht	Canada		27	105
69	Laura Camila Lozano Ramirez	Colombia		28	105
70	Reta Trotman	New Zealand		25	100
71	Jasmin Glaesser	Canada	TIB	22	98
72	Nina Kessler	Netherlands	DLT	26	98
73	Natalia Boyarskaya	Russia	SEF	31	97
74	Alison Tetrick	United States	BPK	29	96
75	Małgorzata Jasińska	Poland	ALE	30	96
76	Iris Slappendel	Netherlands	RBW	29	94
77	Edwige Pitel	France	MIC	47	92
78	Denise Ramsden	Canada	OPW	24	91
79	Cecilie Gotaas Johnsen	Norway	HPU	38	85
80	Mei Yu Hsiao	Chinese Taipei		29	84
81	Paulina Brzeźna	Poland		33	79
82	Karol-Ann Canuel	Canada	SLU	26	78
83	Alison Powers	United States	UHC	35	75
84	Tatiana Antoshina	Russia	RVL	32	75
85	Shara Gillow	Australia	GEW	27	73.5
86	Jessie Daams	Belgium	DLT	24	73
87	Sara Mustonen	Sweden	GIW	33	69.25
88	Zhao Juan Meng	Hong Kong, China		25	66
89	Annalisa Cucinotta	Italy	SEF	28	65
90	Brianna Walle	United States	OPW	30	63
91	Jutatip Maneephan	Thailand		26	63
92	Angie González	Venezuela		33	62
93	Martina Sáblíková	Czech Republic		27	59
94	Mélodie Lesueur	France	LKT	24	58
95	Marina Likhanova	Russia	SEF	24	58
96	Alexandra Burchenkova	Russia	RVL	26	58
97	Xiao Juan Diao	Hong Kong, China		28	56
98	Élise Delzenne	France	SLU	25	56
99	Elke Gebhardt	Germany	BCT	31	55
100	Marta Tagliaferro	Italy	ALE	25	53

== UCI Teams Ranking ==
Final ranking of the 2014 UCI women's teams.

	Team	Nation	Points
1	Rabo Liv Women Cycling Team	Netherlands	3422.75
2	Specialized–lululemon	United States	2230
3	Boels–Dolmans Cycling Team	Netherlands	2102
4	Orica–AIS	Australia	1925.5
5	Team Giant–Shimano	Netherlands	1914
6	Hitec Products	Norway	1396.5
7	Wiggle–Honda	Great Britain	1252
8	Alé–Cipollini	Italy	1176
9	Astana BePink Women's Team	Italy	1152
10	Estado De Mexico Faren	Mexico	851
11	UnitedHealthcare Professional Cycling Team	United States	778
12	Lotto–Belisol Ladies	Belgium	770
13	RusVelo	Russia	738
14	Optum p/b Kelly Benefit Strategies	United States	631
15	Bigla Cycling Team	Switzerland	484
16	BTC City Ljubljana	Slovenia	313
17	Servetto Footon	Italy	270
18	TIBCO / To The Top	United States	236
19	S.C. Michela Fanini Rox	Italy	226
20	Futurumshop.nl–Zannata	Netherlands	221.5
21	Poitou–Charentes.Futuroscope.86	France	213
22	Lointek	Spain	212
23	Topsport Vlaanderen–Pro-Duo	Belgium	140
24	Parkhotel Valkenburg Continental Team	Netherlands	94
25	Vaiano Fondriest	Italy	92
26	Bizkaia–Durango	Spain	71
27	Forno d'Asolo–Astute	Lithuania	42
28	Team Rytger	Denmark	37
29	China Chongming–Giant–Champion System Pro Cycling	Hong Kong	21
30	Top Girls Fassa Bortolo	Italy	19
31	No Radunion Vitalogic	Austria	7

== Nations Ranking ==
Final ranking 2014

	Nation	Code	Points
1	Netherlands	NED	4073
2	Italy	ITA	2410
3	United States	USA	2132.25
4	Germany	GER	1679.25
5	Great Britain	GBR	1436.25
6	Sweden	SWE	1408.5
7	France	FRA	1386
8	Belgium	BEL	991
9	Australia	AUS	899.75
10	Russia	RUS	765
11	Belarus	BLR	652
12	Canada	CAN	588
13	Poland	POL	583
14	Brazil	BRA	474
15	Ukraine	UKR	447
16	New Zealand	NZL	394.5
17	South Africa	RSA	314.25
18	Norway	NOR	256.25
19	Switzerland	SUI	245.5
20	Luxembourg	LUX	201.25
21	Venezuela	VEN	199
22	Colombia	COL	196
23	Finland	FIN	189
24	Cuba	CUB	163
25	Austria	AUT	162
26	Hong Kong, China	HKG	138
27	Chinese Taipei	TPE	115
28	Thailand	THA	105
29	Czech Republic	CZE	83
30	Lithuania	LTU	81
31	Korea	KOR	78
32	Denmark	DEN	77.25
33	Eritrea	ERI	69.68
34	Namibia	NAM	63
35	Japan	JPN	56
36	Mexico	MEX	53
37	Slovenia	SLO	52
38	Spain	ESP	46
39	Costa Rica	CRC	43
40	Argentina	ARG	39
41	Croatia	CRO	38
42	Greece	GRE	32
43	Hungary	HUN	32
44	Belize	BIZ	31
45	Guatemala	GUA	31
46	Turkey	TUR	31
47	Rwanda	RWA	31
48	Tunisia	TUN	31
49	Israel	ISR	31
50	Portugal	POR	30
51	Panama	PAN	30
52	Iran	IRI	30
53	Estonia	EST	30
54	Bermuda	BER	28
55	Romania	ROU	28
56	El Salvador	ESA	27
57	Syria	SYR	26
58	Puerto Rico	PUR	25
59	Algeria	ALG	22
60	Uzbekistan	UZB	22
61	Latvia	LAT	22
62	Morocco	MAR	21
63	Bosnia & Herzegovina	BIH	21
64	Vietnam	VIE	19
65	China	CHN	18
66	Indonesia	INA	15
67	Mongolia	MGL	15
68	Paraguay	PAR	12
69	Ethiopia	ETH	10.68
70	Serbia	SRB	9
71	Ireland	IRL	6
72	Chile	CHI	6
73	Nigeria	NGR	5.01
74	Ecuador	ECU	5
75	Kazakhstan	KAZ	4

Preceded by 2013	UCI Women's Road Rankings; 2014	Succeeded by 2015
