= 2014 Grand Prix GSB =

Race details
- Dates: 6 March 2014
- Stages: 1
- Distance: 97 km (60 mi)
- Winning time: 2h 51' 40"

Results
	Winner	Olga Zabelinskaya (RUS)	(RusVelo)
	Second	Alena Amialiusik (BLR)	(Astana BePink)
	Third	Mara Abbott (USA)	(UnitedHealthcare)

The 2014 Grand Prix GSB was a one-day women's cycle race held in El Salvador on 6 March 2014. It ran from Salvador del Mundo to Juayua over 97 km (60.3 mi), and had an UCI rating of 1.1.

== Results ==
	Rider	Team	Time
1	Olga Zabelinskaya (RUS)	RusVelo	2h 51' 40"
2	Alena Amialiusik (BLR)	Astana BePink	+ 1' 11"
3	Mara Abbott (USA)	UnitedHealthcare	+ 2' 09"
4	Sharon Laws (GBR)	UnitedHealthcare	+ 2' 41"
5	Elena Kuchinskaya (RUS)	RusVelo	+ 2' 41"
6	Tetyana Riabchenko (UKR)	DNA Cycling-K4	+ 2' 59"
7	Flávia Oliveira (BRA)	Brazil (national team)	+ 2' 59"
8	Alexandra Burchenkova (RUS)	RusVelo	+ 3' 01"
9	Doris Schweizer (SUI)	Astana BePink	+ 3' 02"
10	Diana Peñuela (COL)	Colombia-Specialized	+ 3' 04"

== See also ==
- 2014 in women's road cycling
