= 2014 Tour of Zhoushan Island =

Race details
- Dates: 21–23 May
- Stages: 3

The 2014 Tour of Zhoushan Island is a stage race held in China, with a UCI rating of 2.2. It was the eleventh stage race of the 2014 Women's Elite cycling calendar.

== Stages ==
=== Stage 1 ===
21 May 2014 — Shengsi to Shengsi

Stage 1 result

	Rider	Team	Time
1	Charlotte Becker (GER)	Wiggle–Honda	2h 15' 10"
2	Barbara Guarischi (ITA)	Alé Cipollini	s.t.
3	Marta Tagliaferro (ITA)	Alé Cipollini	s.t.
4	Anna Trevisi (ITA)	Estado de México–Faren Kuota	s.t.
5	Oxana Kozonchuk (ITA)	RusVelo	s.t.
6	Katrin Garfoot (AUS)	Australia (national team)	s.t.
7	Aizhan Zhaparova (RUS)	RusVelo	s.t.
8	Giada Borgato (ITA)	Estado de México–Faren Kuota	s.t.
9	Julie Leth (DEN)	Hitec Products	s.t.
10	Simona Frapporti (ITA)	Astana BePink	s.t.

General Classification after Stage 1

	Rider	Team	Time
1	Charlotte Becker (GER)	Wiggle–Honda	2h 14' 59"
2	Marta Tagliaferro (ITA)	Alé Cipollini	+ 4"
3	Barbara Guarischi (ITA)	Alé Cipollini	+ 5"
4	Julie Leth (DEN)	Hitec Products	+ 9"
5	Anna Trevisi (ITA)	Estado de México–Faren Kuota	+ 11"
6	Oxana Kozonchuk (ITA)	RusVelo	+ 11"
7	Katrin Garfoot (AUS)	Australia (national team)	+ 11"
8	Aizhan Zhaparova (RUS)	RusVelo	+ 11"
9	Giada Borgato (ITA)	Estado de México–Faren Kuota	+ 11"
10	Simona Frapporti (ITA)	Astana BePink	+ 11"

=== Stage 2 ===
22 May 2014 — Shengsi to Shengsi

Stage 2 result

	Rider	Team	Time
1	Olga Zabelinskaya (RUS)	RusVelo	2h 24' 41"
2	Giorgia Bronzini (ITA)	Wiggle–Honda	+ 4' 22"
3	Charlotte Becker (GER)	Wiggle–Honda	+ 4' 22"
4	Elena Cecchini (ITA)	Estado de México–Faren Kuota	+ 4' 22"
5	Katrin Garfoot (AUS)	Australia (national team)	+ 4' 22"
6	Shelley Olds (USA)	Alé Cipollini	+ 4' 22"
7	Aizhan Zhaparova (RUS)	RusVelo	+ 4' 22"
8	Olena Sharga (UKR)	Ukraine (national team)	+ 4' 24"
9	Sari Saarelainen (FIN)	Servetto Footon	+ 4' 24"
10	Elena Kuchinskaya (RUS)	RusVelo	+ 4' 24"

General Classification after Stage 2

	Rider	Team	Time
1	Charlotte Becker (GER)	Wiggle–Honda	4h 43' 58"
2	Marta Tagliaferro (ITA)	Alé Cipollini	+ 8"
3	Katrin Garfoot (AUS)	Australia (national team)	+ 15"
4	Aizhan Zhaparova (RUS)	RusVelo	+ 15"
5	Elena Kuchinskaya (RUS)	RusVelo	+ 16"
6	Olena Sharga (UKR)	Ukraine (national team)	+ 17"
7	Sari Saarelainen (FIN)	Servetto Footon	+ 17"
8	Rozanne Slik (NED)	Parkhotel Valkenburg	+ 20"
9	Olga Zabelinskaya (RUS)	RusVelo	+ 20"
10	Julie Leth (DEN)	Hitec Products	+ 1' 05"

=== Stage 3 ===
23 May 2014 — Zhujiajian to Zhujiajian

Stage 3 result

	Rider	Team	Time
1	Giorgia Bronzini (ITA)	Wiggle–Honda	2h 05' 12"
2	Annalisa Cucinotta (ITA)	Servetto Footon	s.t.
3	Shelley Olds (USA)	Alé Cipollini	s.t.
4	Elena Cecchini (ITA)	Estado de México–Faren Kuota	s.t.
5	Aizhan Zhaparova (RUS)	RusVelo	s.t."
6	Marta Tagliaferro (ITA)	Alé Cipollini	s.t.
7	Charlotte Becker (GER)	Wiggle–Honda	s.t.
8	Giada Borgato (ITA)	Estado de México–Faren Kuota	s.t."
9	Olga Zabelinskaya (RUS)	RusVelo	s.t.
10	Niman Song (CHN)	China Chongming–Giant Pro Cycling	s.t.

Final General Classification

	Rider	Team	Time
1	Charlotte Becker (GER)	Wiggle–Honda	6h 49' 10"
2	Marta Tagliaferro (ITA)	Alé Cipollini	+ 8"
3	Aizhan Zhaparova (RUS)	RusVelo	+ 15"
4	Katrin Garfoot (AUS)	Australia (national team)	+ 15"
5	Elena Kuchinskaya (RUS)	RusVelo	+ 16"
6	Sari Saarelainen (FIN)	Servetto Footon	+ 17"
7	Olena Sharga (UKR)	Ukraine (national team)	+ 17"
8	Olga Zabelinskaya (RUS)	RusVelo	+ 20"
9	Rozanne Slik (NED)	Parkhotel Valkenburg	+ 20"
10	Julie Leth (DEN)	Hitec Products	+ 1' 05"

== Classification leadership table ==
Jerseys
denotes the overall race leader.
denotes the leader of the points classification.
denotes the leader of the mountains classification.
denotes the best Asian rider classification.

Stage	Winner	General classification	Points classification	Mountains classification	Best Asian rider classification
1	Charlotte Becker	Charlotte Becker	Charlotte Becker	Elena Kuchinskaya	Mayuko Hagiwara
2	Olga Zabelinskaya	Charlotte Becker	Charlotte Becker	Katrin Garfoot	Mayuko Hagiwara
3	Giorgia Bronzini	Charlotte Becker	Giorgia Bronzini	Katrin Garfoot	Mayuko Hagiwara
Final		Charlotte Becker	Giorgia Bronzini	Katrin Garfoot	Mayuko Hagiwara
