= 2014 Grand Prix de Oriente =

Race details
- Dates: 7 March 2014
- Stages: 1
- Distance: 99 km (62 mi)
- Winning time: 2h 48' 19"

Results
	Winner	Mara Abbott (USA)	(UnitedHealthcare)
	Second	Flávia Oliveira (BRA)	(Brazil national team)
	Third	Sharon Laws (GBR)	(UnitedHealthcare)

The 2014 Grand Prix de Oriente was a single-day women's cycle race held in El Salvador on 7 March 2014. The race held a UCI rating of 1.2.

== Results ==
	Rider	Team	Time
1	Mara Abbott (USA)	UnitedHealthcare	2h 48' 19"
2	Flávia Oliveira (BRA)	Brazil (national team)	+ 1' 10"
3	Sharon Laws (GBR)	UnitedHealthcare	+ 1' 10"
4	Olga Zabelinskaya (RUS)	RusVelo	+ 1' 10"
5	Doris Schweizer (SUI)	Astana BePink	+ 1' 32"
6	Alena Amialiusik (BLR)	Astana BePink	+ 1' 48"
7	Elena Kuchinskaya (RUS)	RusVelo	+ 2' 36"
8	Marina Likhanova (RUS)	Servetto-Zhiraf	+ 2' 46"
9	Miranda Griffiths (AUS)	Vanderkitten	+ 3' 29"
10	Tetyana Riabchenko (UKR)	DNA Cycling-K4	+ 3' 53"

== See also ==
- 2014 in women's road cycling
