= 2013 UCI Road World Championships – Women's road race =

Women's road race
2013 UCI Road World Championships
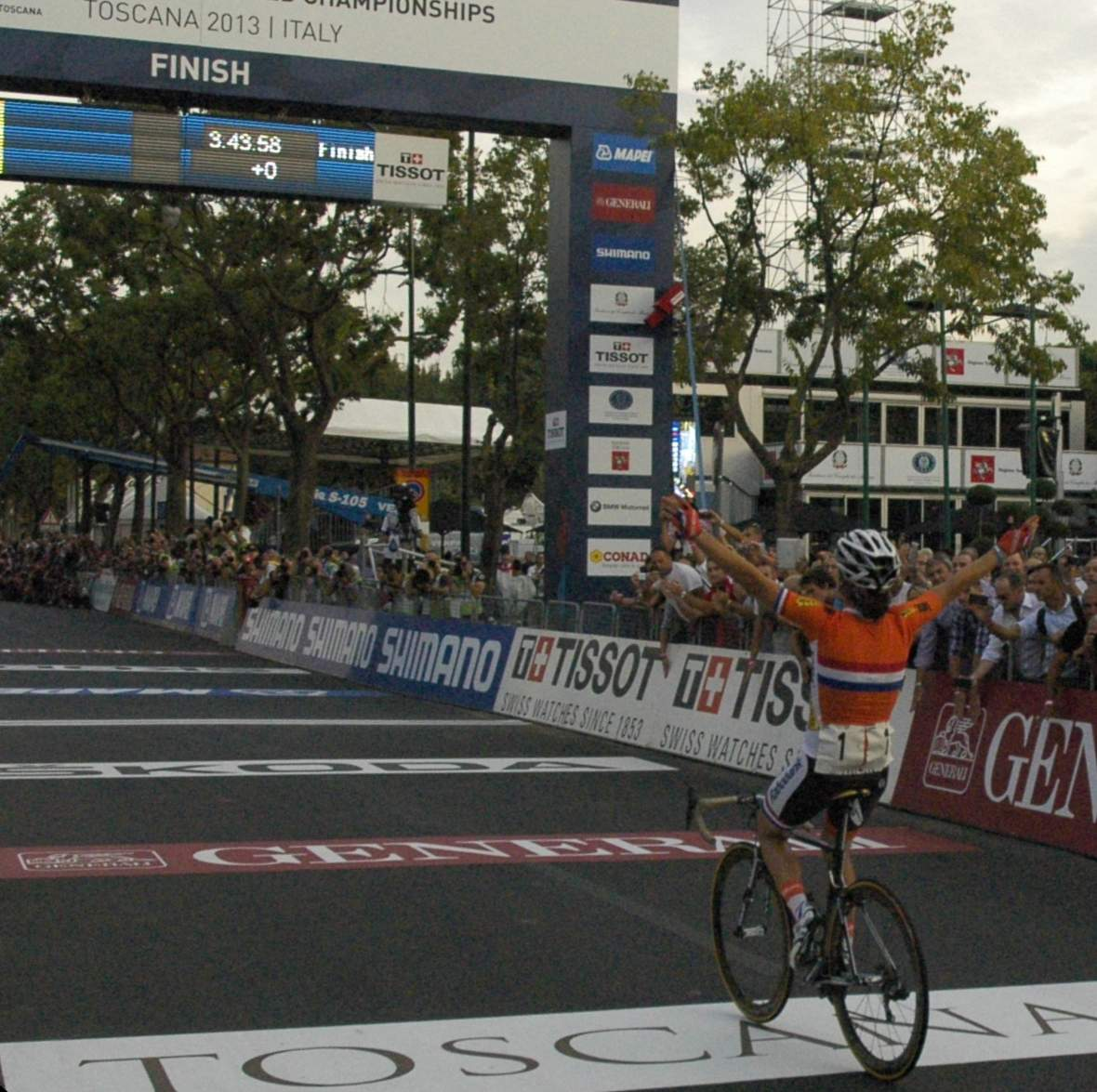
- Marianne Vos winning the race

Race details
- Dates: 28 September 2013
- Stages: 1 in (Italy) Florence (ITA)
- Distance: 140.05 km (87.02 mi)
- Winning time: 3h 44' 00"

Medalists
	Gold	(Netherlands) Marianne Vos (NED)
	Silver	(Sweden) Emma Johansson (SWE)
	Bronze	(Italy) Rossella Ratto (ITA)

Full re-run Highlights Interview Marianne Vos

The Women's road race of the 2013 UCI Road World Championships was a cycling event that took place on 28 September 2013 in the region of Tuscany, Italy.

The course of the race was 140.05 km (87.02 mi) from the town of Montecatini Terme to the Nelson Mandela Forum in Florence.

== Qualification ==
Qualification was based mainly on the 2013 UCI Nation Ranking as of 15 August 2013. The first five nations in this classification qualified 7 riders to start, the next ten nations qualified 6 riders to start and the next 5 nations qualified 5 riders to start. Other nations and non ranked nations had the possibility to send 3 riders to start.

- Netherlands (7)
- Italy (7)
- Australia (7)
- United States (7)
- Sweden (7)
- Germany (6)
- Great Britain (6)
- Russia (6)
- Belgium (6)
- Poland (6)
- New Zealand (6)
- Canada (6)
- France (6)
- South Africa (6)
- Belarus (6)
- Brazil (5)
- Colombia (5)
- Ukraine (5)
- Lithuania (5)
- Luxembourg (5)
- All other National Federations (3)

Moreover, the outgoing World Champion and continental champions were able to take part in the race.

- Outgoing World Champion: Marianne Vos (NED)
- African Champion: Ashleigh Moolman (RSA)
- American Champion: Alenis Sierra (CUB)
- Asian Champion: Mei Yu Hsia (TPE)
- European Champion: Susanna Zorzi (ITA)
- Oceanian Champion: Amy Bradley (AUS)

== Participating nations ==
141 riders from 43 nations participated in the women's road race.

- Argentina
- Australia
- Austria
- Belgium
- Belarus
- Brazil
- Canada
- Colombia
- Costa Rica
- Croatia
- Czech Republic
- Denmark
- Spain
- Finland
- France
- (United Kingdom) Great Britain
- Germany
- Hungary
- (Republic of Ireland) Ireland
- Israel
- Italy
- Jordan
- Japan
- Latvia
- Lithuania
- Luxembourg
- Mexico
- Mongolia
- Netherlands
- Norway
- New Zealand
- Paraguay
- Poland
- South Africa
- Russia
- Slovenia
- Serbia
- Switzerland
- Sweden
- Thailand
- Ukraine
- United States
- Venezuela

== Schedule ==
Date	Time	Event
28 September 2013	14:15–17:50	Women's road race
28 September 2013	18:10	Victory ceremony

== Results ==
=== Final classification ===
Of the race's 141 entrants, 46 riders completed the full distance of 140.05 kilometres (87.02 mi).

Rank	Rider	Country	Time
Gold medal	Marianne Vos	Netherlands	3h 44' 00"
Silver medal	Emma Johansson	Sweden	+ 15"
Bronze medal	Rossella Ratto	Italy	+ 15"
4	Anna van der Breggen	Netherlands	+ 33"
5	Evelyn Stevens	United States	+ 46"
6	Linda Villumsen	New Zealand	+ 50"
7	Tatiana Guderzo	Italy	+ 52"
8	Elisa Longo Borghini	Italy	+ 52"
9	Tiffany Cromwell	Australia	+ 1' 40"
10	Tatiana Antoshina	Russia	+ 1' 40"
11	Elena Kuchinskaya	Russia	+ 2' 41"
12	Claudia Häusler	Germany	+ 3' 34"
13	Pauline Ferrand-Prévot	France	+ 4' 20"
14	Megan Guarnier	United States	+ 4' 41"
15	Annemiek van Vleuten	Netherlands	+ 5' 03"
16	Ellen van Dijk	Netherlands	+ 5' 03"
17	Paulina Brzeźna-Bentkowska	Poland	+ 5' 03"
18	Maja Włoszczowska	Poland	+ 5' 05"
19	Lizzie Armitstead	United Kingdom	+ 5' 28"
20	Trixi Worrack	Germany	+ 5' 28"
21	Eugenia Bujak	Poland	+ 5' 28"
22	Ashleigh Moolman	South Africa	+ 5' 28"
23	Flávia Oliveira	Brazil	+ 5' 28"
24	Francesca Cauz	Italy	+ 5' 30"
25	Carlee Taylor	Australia	+ 5' 30"
26	Giorgia Bronzini	Italy	+ 5' 35"
27	Lucinda Brand	Netherlands	+ 6' 44"
28	Valentina Scandolara	Italy	+ 7' 40"
29	Jolanda Neff	Switzerland	+ 7' 40"
30	Oxana Kozonchuk	Russia	+ 7' 40"
31	Shara Gillow	Australia	+ 7' 40"
32	Kristin McGrath	United States	+ 7' 40"
33	Karol-Ann Canuel	Canada	+ 7' 40"
34	Edwige Pitel	France	+ 7' 40"
35	Doris Schweizer	Switzerland	+ 7' 46"
36	Tetyana Ryabchenko	Ukraine	+ 8' 51"
37	Mara Abbott	United States	+ 9' 40"
38	Miriam Bjørnsrud	Norway	+ 12' 09"
39	Liesbet De Vocht	Belgium	+ 12' 09"
40	Eri Yonamine	Japan	+ 12' 09"
41	Susanna Zorzi	Italy	+ 12' 09"
42	Inga Čilvinaitė	Lithuania	+ 12' 09"
43	Anastasia Chulkova	Russia	+ 13' 00"
44	Andrea Dvorak	United States	+ 13' 00"
45	Yevheniya Vysotska	Ukraine	+ 13' 00"
46	Anna Sanchis	Spain	+ 13' 00"

Rider	Country	Time
Noemi Cantele	Italy	DNF
Hanna Solovey	Ukraine	DNF
Audrey Cordon	France	DNF
Madelene Olsson	Sweden	DNF
Jo Kiesanowski	New Zealand	DNF
Natalia Boyarskaya	Russia	DNF
Lorena Vargas	Colombia	DNF
Maaike Polspoel	Belgium	DNF
Reta Trotman	New Zealand	DNF
Tüvshinjargalyn Enkhjargal	Mongolia	DNF
Cecilie Gotaas Johnsen	Norway	DNF
Paz Bash	Israel	DNF
Uênia Fernandes de Souza	Brazil	DNF
Aude Biannic	France	DNF
Amanda Spratt	Australia	DNF
Élise Delzenne	France	DNF
Olivia Dillon	Ireland	DNF
Melanie Späth	Ireland	DNF
Ingrid Lorvik	Norway	DNF
Julie Leth	Denmark	DNF
Daiva Tušlaitė	Lithuania	DNF
Diana Peñuela	Colombia	DNF
Agnė Šilinytė	Lithuania	DNF
Špela Kern	Slovenia	DNF
Małgorzata Jasińska	Poland	DNF
Patricia Schwager	Switzerland	DNF
Lex Albrecht	Canada	DNF
Romy Kasper	Germany	DNF
Lisa Brennauer	Germany	DNF
Leah Kirchmann	Canada	DNF
Ane Santesteban	Spain	DNF
Denise Ramsden	Canada	DNF
Polona Batagelj	Slovenia	DNF
Urša Pintar	Slovenia	DNF
Carolina Rodríguez	Mexico	DNF
Amy Cure	Australia	DNF
Gracie Elvin	Australia	DNF
Christine Majerus	Luxembourg	DNF
Annelies Van Doorslaer	Belgium	DNF
Sofie De Vuyst	Belgium	DNF
Esther Fennel	Germany	DNF
Andrea Graus	Austria	DNF
Martina Ritter	Austria	DNF
Daniela Pintarelli	Austria	DNF
Sara Mustonen	Sweden	DNF
Joëlle Numainville	Canada	DNF
Amy Pieters	Netherlands	DNF
Minami Uwano	Japan	DNF
Ana Fagu	Colombia	DNF
Lilibeth Chacón	Venezuela	DNF
Belén López	Spain	DNF
Vita Heine	Latvia	DNF
Katarzyna Niewiadoma	Poland	DNF
Sari Saarelainen	Finland	DNF
Íngrid Drexel	Mexico	DNF
Jessie Daams	Belgium	DNF
Kirsten Wild	Netherlands	DNF
Katie Colclough	United Kingdom	DNF
Nikki Harris	United Kingdom	DNF
Loes Gunnewijk	Netherlands	DNF
Yelyzaveta Oshurkova	Ukraine	DNF
Silvija Latožaitė	Lithuania	DNF
Ivanna Borovychenko	Ukraine	DNF
Katarzyna Pawłowska	Poland	DNF
Lauren Kitchen	Australia	DNF
Martina Růžičková	Czech Republic	DNF
Ana Teresa Casas	Mexico	DNF
Edith Guillén	Costa Rica	DNF
Diána Szurominé Pulsfort	Hungary	DNF
Chanpeng Nontasin	Thailand	DNF
Jutatip Maneephan	Thailand	DNF
Antonela Ferenčić	Croatia	DNF
Clemilda Fernandes	Brazil	DNF
Supaksorn Nuntana	Thailand	DNF
Kathryn Bertine	Saint Kitts and Nevis	DNF
Véronique Fortin	Canada	DNF
Kataržina Sosna	Lithuania	DNF
Christel Ferrier-Bruneau	France	DNF
Emilia Fahlin	Sweden	DNF
Jessica Kihlbom	Sweden	DNF
Céline Van Severen	Belgium	DNF
Svetlana Stolbova	Russia	DNF
Hanna Nilsson	Sweden	DNF
Martina Thomasson	Sweden	DNF
Elke Gebhardt	Germany	DNF
Karen Doljak	Paraguay	DNF
Carmen Small	United States	DNF
Jade Wilcoxson	United States	DNF
Lucy Garner	United Kingdom	DNF
Emily Collins	New Zealand	DNF
Tereza Trefná	Czech Republic	DNF
Lotta Lepistö	Finland	DNF
Samah Khaled	Jordan	DNF
Cindi Di Natale	Argentina	DNF
Dragana Kovačević	Serbia	DNF

== Gallery ==
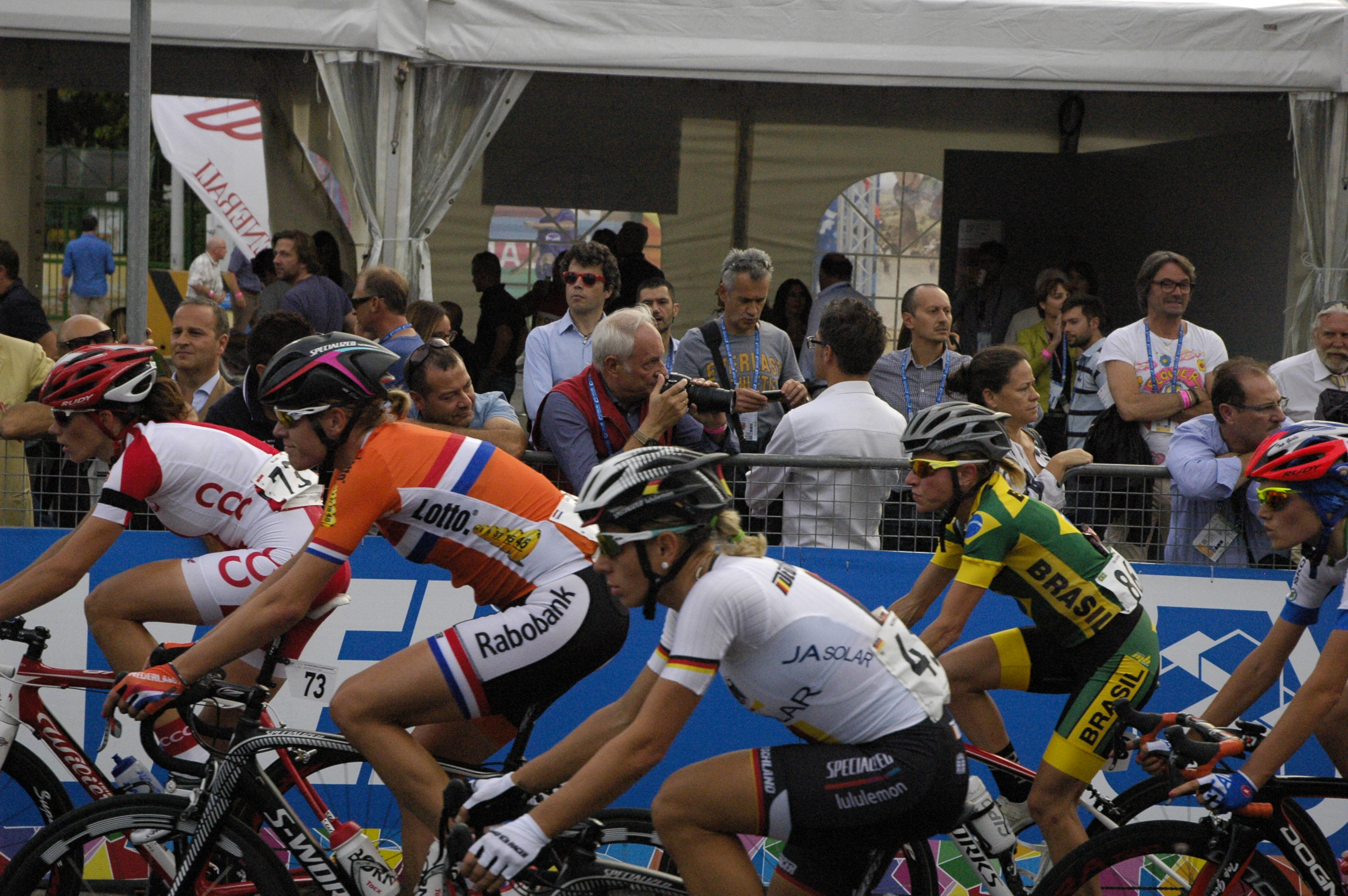
The peloton in an early stage of the race. (Eugenia Bujak (white red), Ellen van Dijk (orange), Trixi Worrack (white), and Flávia Oliveira (yellow green)

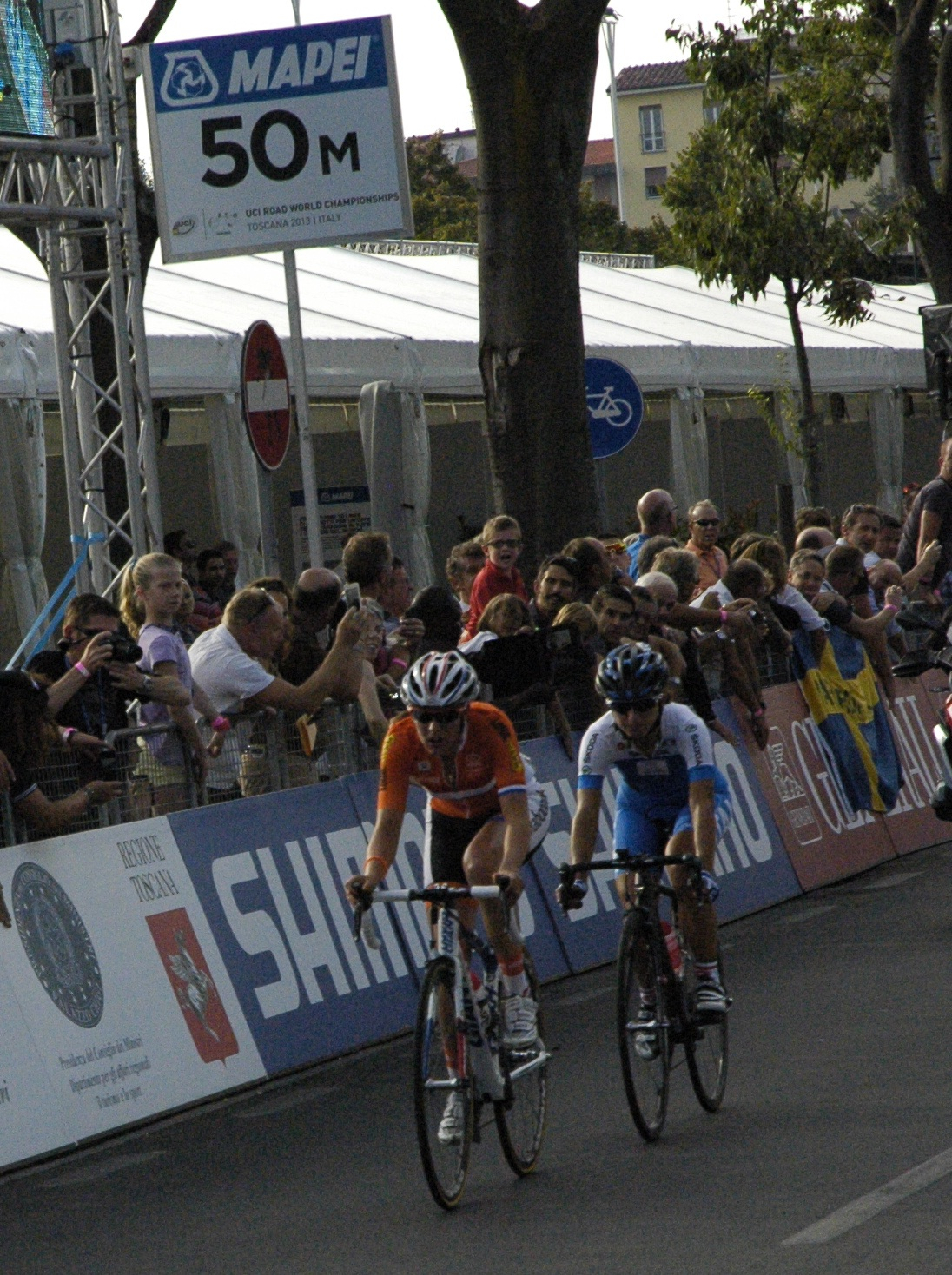
A breakaway of Lucinda Brand and Rossella Ratto

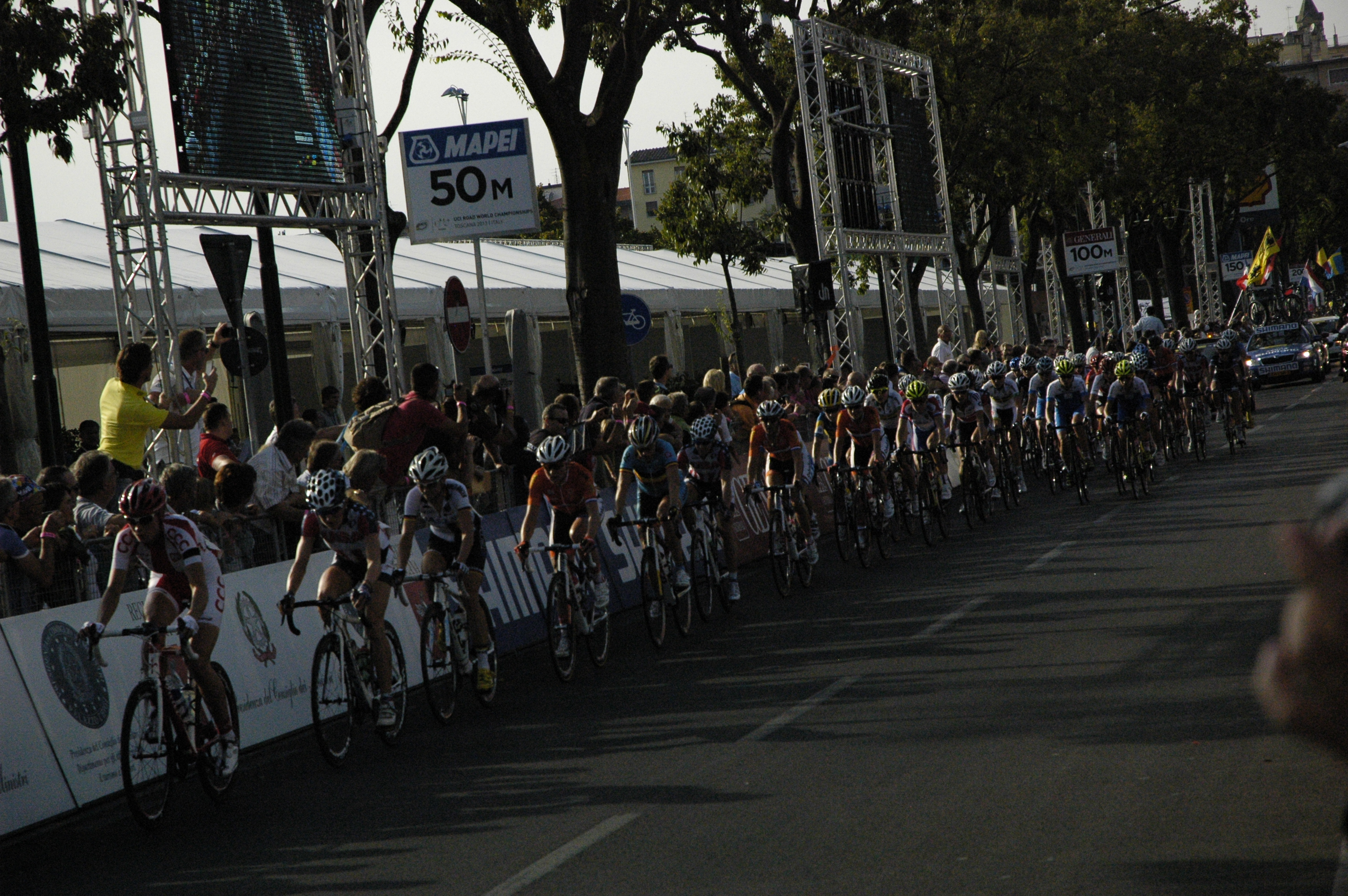
Peloton during the race

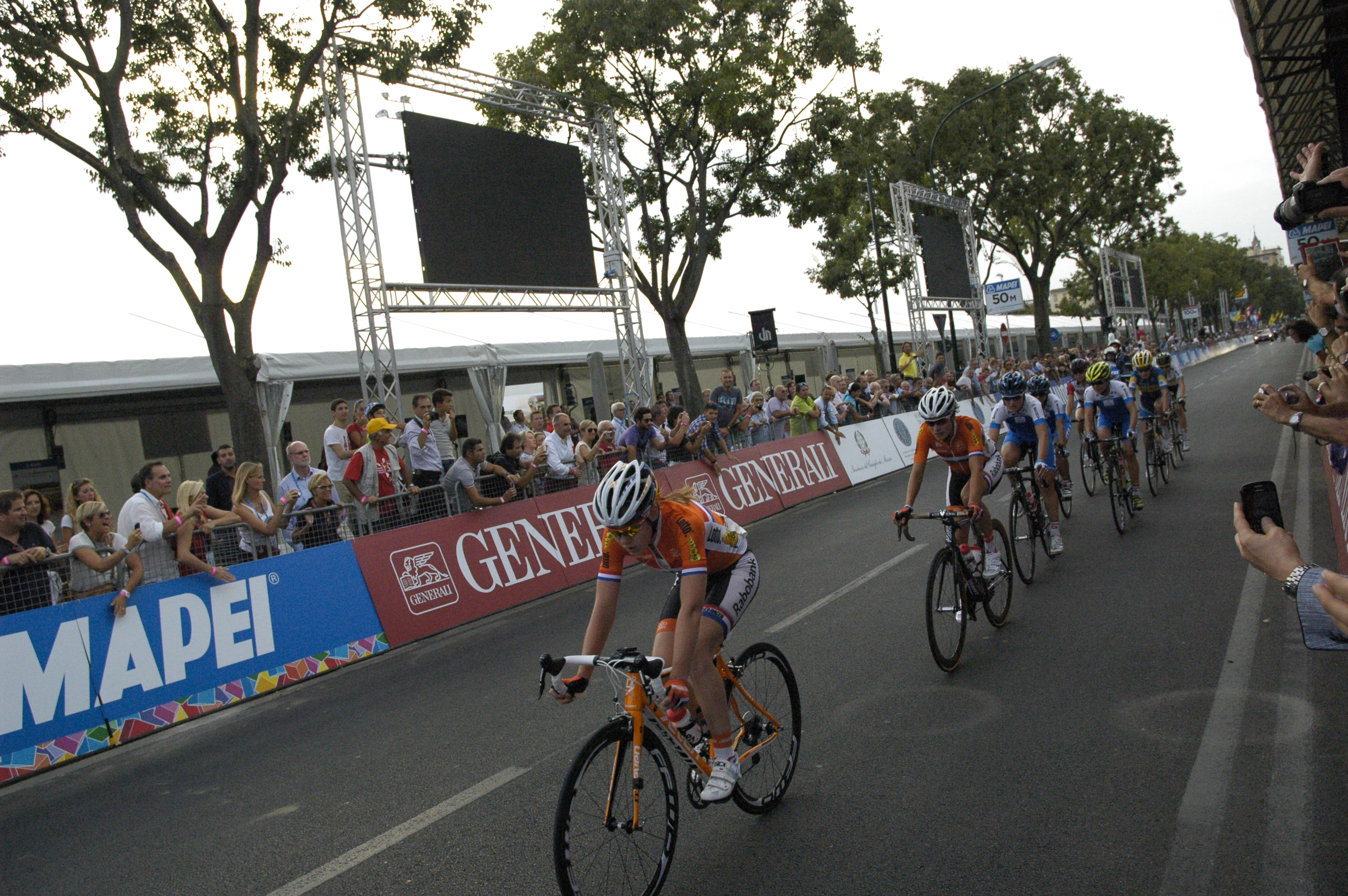
Front group in the final last lap
