= 2014 Vuelta Internacional Femenina a Costa Rica =

Race details
- Dates: 26 February–2 March
- Stages: 5
- Distance: 340.59 km (211.63 mi)
- Winning time: 8h 52' 19"

Results
Jersey awarded to the overall winner	Winner	Olga Zabelinskaya (Russia)	(RusVelo)
	Second	Flávia Oliveira (Brazil)	(Newton)
	Third	Alena Amialiusik (Belarus)	(Astana BePink)
Jersey awarded to the mountains classification winner	Mountains	Alena Amialiusik (Belarus)	(Astana BePink)
Jersey awarded to the youth classification winner	Youth	Susanna Zorzi (Italy)	(Astana BePink)
Jersey awarded to the sprints classification winner	Sprints	Shelley Olds (United States)	(Alé Cipollini)
	Team	RusVelo	

The 2014 Vuelta Internacional Femenina a Costa Rica was a stage race held in Costa Rica, with a UCI rating of 2.2. It was the third stage race of the 2014 Women's Elite cycling calendar.

== Stages ==
=== Stage 1 ===
26 February 2014 – Guápiles to San Miguel de Sarapiquí, 76.95 km (47.8 mi)

Stage 1 Result

	Rider	Team	Time
1	Flávia Oliveira (BRA)	Newton	2h 06' 10"
2	Alena Amialiusik (BLR)	Astana BePink	+ 6"
3	Olga Zabelinskaya (RUS)	RusVelo	+ 8"
4	Elena Kuchinskaya (RUS)	RusVelo	+ 15"
5	Alexandra Burchenkova (RUS)	RusVelo	+ 19"
6	Edith Guillén (CRC)	Pedalea Con Nosotras	+ 22"
7	Doris Schweizer (SUI)	Astana BePink	+ 22"
8	Sérika Gulumá (COL)	Specialized Colombia	+ 27"
9	Shelley Olds (USA)	Alé Cipollini	+ 33"
10	Elena Berlato (ITA)	Alé Cipollini	+ 38"

General Classification after Stage 1

	Rider	Team	Time
1	Flávia Oliveira (BRA)	Newton	2h 06' 00"
2	Alena Amialiusik (BLR)	Astana BePink	+ 10"
3	Olga Zabelinskaya (RUS)	RusVelo	+ 14"
4	Elena Kuchinskaya (RUS)	RusVelo	+ 25"
5	Alexandra Burchenkova (RUS)	RusVelo	+ 29"
6	Edith Guillén (CRC)	Pedalea Con Nosotras	+ 32"
7	Doris Schweizer (SUI)	Astana BePink	+ 32"
8	Sérika Gulumá (COL)	Specialized Colombia	+ 37"
9	Shelley Olds (USA)	Alé Cipollini	+ 43"
10	Elena Berlato (ITA)	Alé Cipollini	+ 48"

=== Stage 2 ===
27 February 2014 – San Gerardo Ticabán to San Rafael La Colonia, 20.4 km (12.7 mi), individual time trial (ITT)

Stage 2 Result

	Rider	Team	Time
1	Olga Zabelinskaya (RUS)	RusVelo	29' 07"
2	Sérika Gulumá (COL)	Specialized Colombia	+ 1' 16"
3	Alexandra Burchenkova (RUS)	RusVelo	+ 1' 31"
4	Shelley Olds (USA)	Alé Cipollini	+ 1' 32"
5	Flávia Oliveira (BRA)	Newton	+ 1' 48"
6	Alena Amialiusik (BLR)	Astana BePink	+ 2' 16"
7	Małgorzata Jasińska (POL)	Alé Cipollini	+ 2' 23"
8	Edith Guillén (CRC)	Pedalea Con Nosotras	+ 2' 28"
9	Elena Berlato (ITA)	Alé Cipollini	+ 2' 35"
10	Aizhan Zhaparova (RUS)	RusVelo	+ 2' 49"

General Classification after Stage 2

	Rider	Team	Time
1	Olga Zabelinskaya (RUS)	RusVelo	2h 35' 21"
2	Flávia Oliveira (BRA)	Newton	+ 1' 34"
3	Sérika Gulumá (COL)	Specialized Colombia	+ 1' 39"
4	Alexandra Burchenkova (RUS)	RusVelo	+ 1' 46"
5	Shelley Olds (USA)	Alé Cipollini	+ 1' 54"
6	Alena Amialiusik (BLR)	Astana BePink	+ 2' 12"
7	Edith Guillén (CRC)	Pedalea Con Nosotras	+ 2' 46"
8	Elena Kuchinskaya (RUS)	RusVelo	+ 3' 04"
9	Elena Berlato (ITA)	Alé Cipollini	+ 3' 09"
10	Małgorzata Jasińska (POL)	Alé Cipollini	+ 3' 23"

=== Stage 3 ===
28 February 2014 – Orotina to Parrita, 85.5 km (53.1 mi)

Stage 3 Result

	Rider	Team	Time
1	Shelley Olds (USA)	Alé Cipollini	1h 57' 57"
2	Anna Stricker (ITA)	Astana BePink	s.t.
3	Yussely Mendivil (MEX)	Mexico (national team)	s.t.
4	Barbara Guarischi (ITA)	Alé Cipollini	+ 3"
5	Diana Peñuela (COL)	Specialized Colombia	+ 3"
6	Małgorzata Jasińska (POL)	Alé Cipollini	+ 3"
7	Alena Amialiusik (BLR)	Astana BePink	+ 3"
8	Maria Tuia (ITA)	Servetto-Zhiraf	+ 3"
9	Flávia Oliveira (BRA)	Newton	+ 3"
10	Alexandra Burchenkova (RUS)	RusVelo	+ 3"

General Classification after Stage 3

	Rider	Team	Time
1	Olga Zabelinskaya (RUS)	RusVelo	4h 33' 21"
2	Flávia Oliveira (BRA)	Newton	+ 1' 34"
3	Shelley Olds (USA)	Alé Cipollini	+ 1' 35"
4	Sérika Gulumá (COL)	Specialized Colombia	+ 1' 39"
5	Alexandra Burchenkova (RUS)	RusVelo	+ 1' 46"
6	Alena Amialiusik (BLR)	Astana BePink	+ 2' 10"
7	Edith Guillén (CRC)	Pedalea Con Nosotras	+ 2' 46"
8	Elena Kuchinskaya (RUS)	RusVelo	+ 3' 04"
9	Elena Berlato (ITA)	Alé Cipollini	+ 3' 09"
10	Małgorzata Jasińska (POL)	Alé Cipollini	+ 3' 22"

=== Stage 4 ===
1 March 2014 – Heredia to Grecia, 84.14 km (52.3 mi)

Stage 4 Result

	Rider	Team	Time
1	Alena Amialiusik (BLR)	Astana BePink	2h 16' 08"
2	Flávia Oliveira (BRA)	Newton	s.t.
3	Olga Zabelinskaya (RUS)	RusVelo	s.t.
4	Elena Berlato (ITA)	Alé Cipollini	s.t.
5	Ana Fagua (COL)	Specialized Colombia	s.t.
6	Ane Santesteban (ESP)	Alé Cipollini	s.t.
7	Doris Schweizer (SUI)	Astana BePink	s.t.
8	Susanna Zorzi (ITA)	Astana BePink	s.t.
9	Bibiana Narváez (COL)	Pedalea Con Nosotras	+ 5"
10	Elena Kuchinskaya (RUS)	RusVelo	+ 20"

General Classification after Stage 4

	Rider	Team	Time
1	Olga Zabelinskaya (RUS)	RusVelo	6h 49' 25"
2	Flávia Oliveira (BRA)	Newton	+ 1' 32"
3	Alena Amialiusik (BLR)	Astana BePink	+ 2' 04"
4	Sérika Gulumá (COL)	Specialized Colombia	+ 2' 59"
5	Elena Berlato (ITA)	Alé Cipollini	+ 3' 13"
6	Edith Guillén (CRC)	Pedalea Con Nosotras	+ 3' 16"
7	Elena Kuchinskaya (RUS)	RusVelo	+ 3' 28"
8	Doris Schweizer (SUI)	Astana BePink	+ 3' 56"
9	Susanna Zorzi (ITA)	Astana BePink	+ 4' 09"
10	Shelley Olds (USA)	Alé Cipollini	+ 4' 09"

=== Stage 5 ===
2 March 2014 – San José to San José, 73.6 km (45.7 mi)

Stage 5 Result

	Rider	Team	Time
1	Shelley Olds (USA)	Alé Cipollini	2h 02' 54"
2	Barbara Guarischi (ITA)	Alé Cipollini	s.t.
3	Anna Stricker (ITA)	Astana BePink	s.t.
4	Yussely Mendivil (MEX)	Mexico (national team)	s.t.
5	Erika Varela (MEX)	Mexico (national team)	s.t.
6	Elena Kuchinskaya (RUS)	RusVelo	s.t.
7	Edith Guillén (CRC)	Pedalea Con Nosotras	s.t.
8	Olga Zabelinskaya (RUS)	RusVelo	s.t.
9	Ana Teresa Casas (MEX)	Mexico (national team)	s.t.
10	Aizhan Zhaparova (RUS)	RusVelo	s.t.

Final General Classification

	Rider	Team	Time
1	Olga Zabelinskaya (RUS)	RusVelo	8h 52' 19"
2	Flávia Oliveira (BRA)	Newton	+ 1' 32"
3	Alena Amialiusik (BLR)	Astana BePink	+ 2' 04"
4	Sérika Gulumá (COL)	Specialized Colombia	+ 2' 58"
5	Edith Guillén (CRC)	Pedalea Con Nosotras	+ 3' 11"
6	Elena Berlato (ITA)	Alé Cipollini	+ 3' 11"
7	Elena Kuchinskaya (RUS)	RusVelo	+ 3' 28"
8	Shelley Olds (USA)	Alé Cipollini	+ 3' 56"
9	Doris Schweizer (SUI)	Astana BePink	+ 3' 56"
10	Susanna Zorzi (ITA)	Astana BePink	+ 4' 09"

== Jerseys ==
denotes the leader of the General classification; the rider who has the lowest accumulated time.

== Classification leadership table ==
Stage	Winner	General classification	Mountains classification	Sprints classification	Young rider classification	Teams classification
1	Flávia Oliveira	Flávia Oliveira	Flávia Oliveira	Shelley Olds	Ana Fagua	RusVelo
2	Olga Zabelinskaya	Olga Zabelinskaya	Flávia Oliveira	Shelley Olds	Susanna Zorzi	RusVelo
3	Shelley Olds	Olga Zabelinskaya	Alena Amialiusik	Shelley Olds	Susanna Zorzi	RusVelo
4	Alena Amialiusik	Olga Zabelinskaya	Alena Amialiusik	Shelley Olds	Susanna Zorzi	RusVelo
5	Shelley Olds	Olga Zabelinskaya	Alena Amialiusik	Shelley Olds	Susanna Zorzi	RusVelo
Final		Olga Zabelinskaya	Alena Amialiusik	Shelley Olds	Susanna Zorzi	RusVelo
