= 2014 Philadelphia Cycling Classic =

Race details
- Dates: 1 June 2014
- Stages: 1

The 2014 The Philadelphia Cycling Classic is a one-day women's cycle race held in the United States on 1 June 2014. The race had a UCI rating of 1.1.

== Results ==
	Rider	Team	Time
1	Evelyn Stevens (USA)	Specialized–lululemon	2h 28' 57"
2	Lex Albrecht (CAN)		s.t.
3	Lauren Hall (USA)	Team Optum p/b Kelly Benefit Strategies	s.t.
4	Alena Amialiusik (BLR)	Astana BePink	s.t.
5	Flávia Oliveira (BRA)	Firefighters Upsala CK	s.t.
6	Lizzie Williams (AUS)		s.t.
7	Mara Abbott (USA)	UnitedHealthcare	s.t.
8	Sharon Laws (USA)	UnitedHealthcare	s.t.
9	Joanne Kiesanowski (NZL)	Team TIBCO - To The Top	s.t.
10	Mandy Heintz (USA)		s.t.

== See also ==
- 2014 in women's road cycling
