= Grand Prix GSB =

Salvador women bike race

Race details
- Date: March
- Region: El Salvador
- Discipline: Road

History
- First edition: 2012
- Editions: 3 (as of 2014)
- First winner: Evelyn García (SLV)
- Most wins: Evelyn García (SLV); Clemilda Fernandes Silva (BRA); Olga Zabelinskaya (RUS) (1 win)
- Most recent: Olga Zabelinskaya (RUS)

The Grand Prix GSB (Grand Saint Bernard) is an elite women's professional one-day road bicycle race held in El Salvador.

== Past winners ==
Year	Country	Rider	Team
2012	El Salvador	Evelyn García	
2013	Brazil	Clemilda Fernandes Silva	
2014	Russia	Olga Zabelinskaya	
