= Tour of Eftalia Hotels & Velo Alanya =

Annual professional road bicycle racing

Grand Prix Velo Alanya
Race details
- Date: February
- Region: Turkey
- Discipline: Road
- Competition: UCI 2.2 (2018); UCI 1.2 (2019–)
- Type: Oneday race
- Web site: gp.veloalanya.com

History
- First edition: 2018
- Editions: 4 (as of 2021)
- First winner: Olga Zabelinskaya (RUS)
- Most recent: Olga Zabelinskaya (RUS)

The Grand Prix Velo Alanya is an annual professional road bicycle racing for women in Turkey.

== Winners ==
Year	Country	Rider	Team
2018	Russia	Olga Zabelinskaya	Velo Alanya Cycling Team

== Classification leaders jerseys ==
Classification	2018
General	
Points	
Mountains	
