= Firefighters Upsala CK =

Swedish professional cycling team

Team information
- UCI code: FFT
- Registered: Sweden
- Founded: 2014
- Discipline: Road
- Status: UCI Women's Team

Team name history
- 2014: Firefighters Upsala CK

Firefighters Upsala CK (UCI team code: FFT) is a professional cycling team based in Sweden, which competes in elite road bicycle racing events such as the UCI Women's Road World Cup.

== Team roster ==
- Saga Lindströms

== Major wins ==
2014
Stage 1 Vuelta Internacional Femenina a Costa Rica, Flávia Oliveira
Stage 3 Vuelta a El Salvador, Flávia Oliveira
