= Thuy Dung Nguyen =

Vietnamese road cyclist

Personal information
- Born: 20 August 1978 (age 48) Vietnam

Cycling career
- Sport: Cycling
- Discipline: Road cycling

Professional team
- 2008–2009: Giant Pro Cycling

Thuy Dung Nguyen (born 20 August 1978) is a road cyclist from Vietnam. In 2012, she won The Princess Maha Chackri Sirindhon's Cup.
