= Salvador del Mundo, Asunción =

Coordinates: 25.2735°S 57.5507°W

Salvador del Mundo
- Barrio
- Interactive map of Salvador del Mundo
- Country: Paraguay
- Autonomous Capital District: Gran Asunción
- City: Asunción

Area
  - Total: 0.53 km^{2} (0.20 sq mi)
- Elevation: 43 m (141 ft)

Population
  - Total: 3,658

Salvador del Mundo is a neighbourhood (barrio) of Asunción, Paraguay.
