= Miriam Bjørnsrud =

Norwegian cyclist (born 1992)

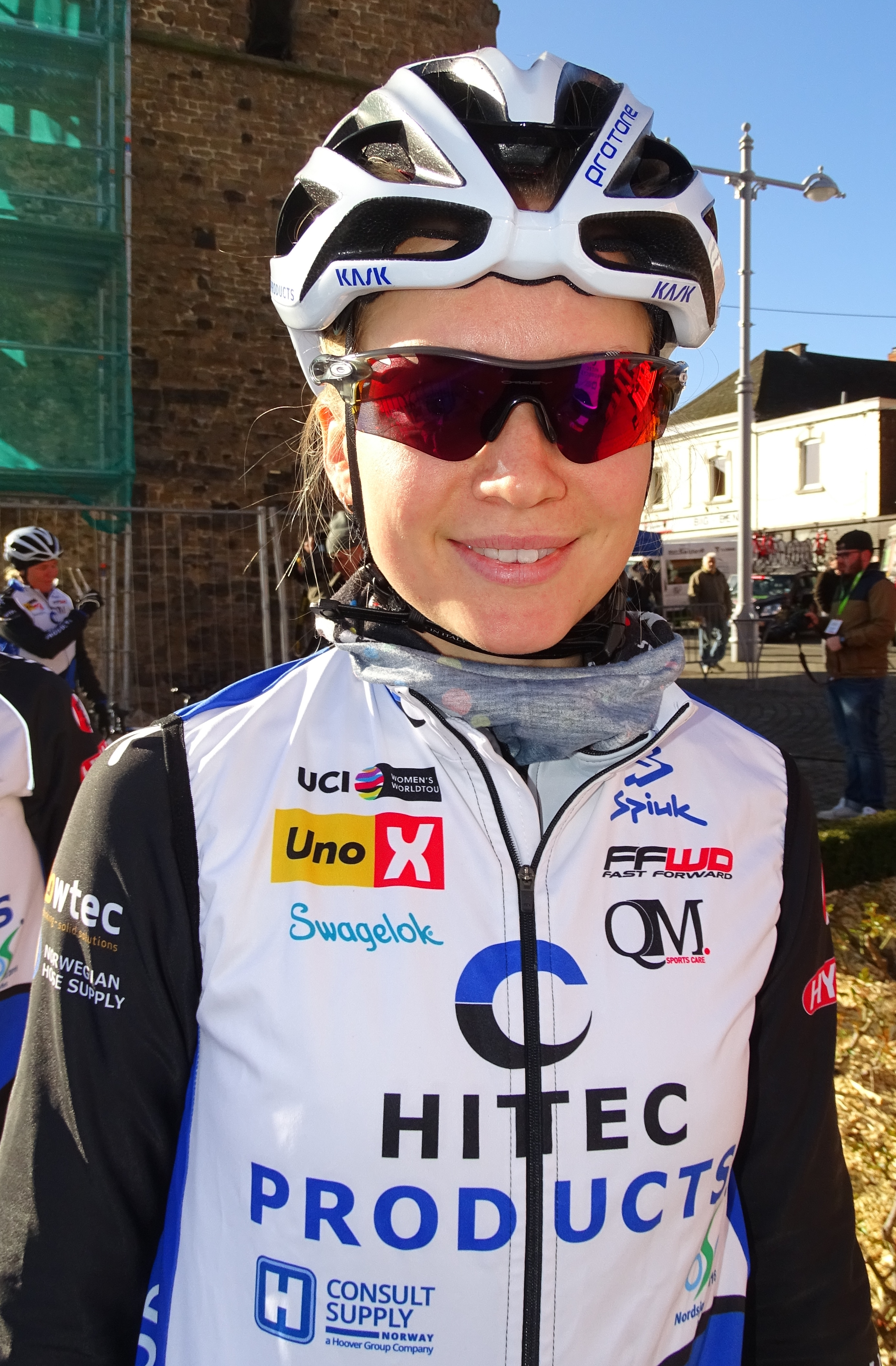
- Before the start of Le Samyn 2016

Personal information
- Born: 9 October 1992 (age 34) Eidsvoll, Norway

Cycling career
- Sport: Cycling
- Current team: Retired
- Discipline: Road
- Role: Rider

Professional team
- 2013–2017: Team Hitec Products

Major wins
- National Championships Road Race (2015)

Miriam Bjørnsrud (born 9 October 1992) is a Norwegian former racing cyclist. She finished 38th in the 2013 UCI women's road race in Florence. In 2015, she won the Norwegian National Road Race Championships.

Before the 2017 UCI Road World Championships being contested in her home country, she announced that she would retire from racing, her last race was with Team Hitec Products in the team time trial. She stated an inability to shake off anxiety completely while racing in the peloton after she was injured in a high speed crash at the 2014 Road World Championships road race.

== Major results ==
2010
National Junior Road Championships

1st Road race
2nd Time trial

2012
National Road Championships

2nd Road race
2nd Criterium

2013
2nd Road race, National Road Championships
7th Road race, UEC European Under-23 Road Championships
2014
1st Criterium, National Road Championships
2015
1st Road race, National Road Championships
3rd Cholet Pays de Loire Dames
4th Erondegemse Pijl
2016
National Road Championships

2nd Road race
3rd Time trial

2017
3rd Overall Tour of Thailand

1st Mountains classification
