= RusVelo Women's Team =

Russian cycling team

Team information
- UCI code: RVL
- Registered: Russia
- Founded: 2012
- Disbanded: 2014
- Discipline: Road
- Status: UCI Women's Team

Team name history
- 2012–2014: RusVelo Women's Team
RusVelo Women's Team jersey
Jersey

RusVelo Women's Team, a part of the Russian Global Cycling Project (which included Team Katusha and Itera–Katusha), was a Russian road & track cycling team. RusVelo included both men's and women's rosters.

== Team history ==
=== 2014 ===
==== Riders out ====
On November 5 Elena Kuchinskaya left the team to join Servetto Footon as did Tatiana Antoshina on November 8. On December 6, Aizhan Zhaparova left the team to join Astana–Acca Due O.

== Major wins ==
2012
Overall Albstadt, Hanka Kupfernagel
Stage 3 Tour of Adygeya, Irina Molicheva
Prologue Thüringen-Rundfahrt der Frauen, Hanka Kupfernagel
GP Oberbaselbiet, Hanka Kupfernagel
Lorsch Cyclo-cross, Hanka Kupfernagel
Frankfurt Cyclo-cross, Hanka Kupfernagel
2013
Stage 1 Tour of Adygeya, Alexandra Burchenkova
Stage 1 Tour de Bretagne, Oxana Kozonchuk
Stage 1 Tour Féminin en Limousin, Oxana Kozonchuk
Stadl Paura Cyclo-cross, Hanka Kupfernagel
Lorsch Cyclo-cross, Hanka Kupfernagel
2014
Overall Vuelta Femenina a Costa Rica, Olga Zabelinskaya

Team classification
Stage 2, Olga Zabelinskaya

Grand Prix GSB, Olga Zabelinskaya
Prologue Vuelta a El Salvador, Olga Zabelinskaya
Stage 5 Vuelta a El Salvador, Inga Čilvinaitė
EKZ CrossTour – Baden, Eva Lechner
EKZ CrossTour – Dielsdorf, Eva Lechner

== National and continental champions ==
2012
Russia National Time Trial Championships, Olga Zabelinskaya
European U23 Track Championships (Team Pursuit), Lydia Malakhova
European U23 Track Championships (Team Pursuit), Elena Lichmanova
2013
European U23 Track Championship, Maria Mishina
Russia National Track Championship (Team Pursuit), Maria Mishina
2014
Russia National Time Trial Championships, Tatiana Antoshina
Russia National Road Race Championships, Tatiana Antoshina

== See also ==
RusVelo men's team: RusVelo
