= Flávia Oliveira =

Brazilian cyclist (born 1981)

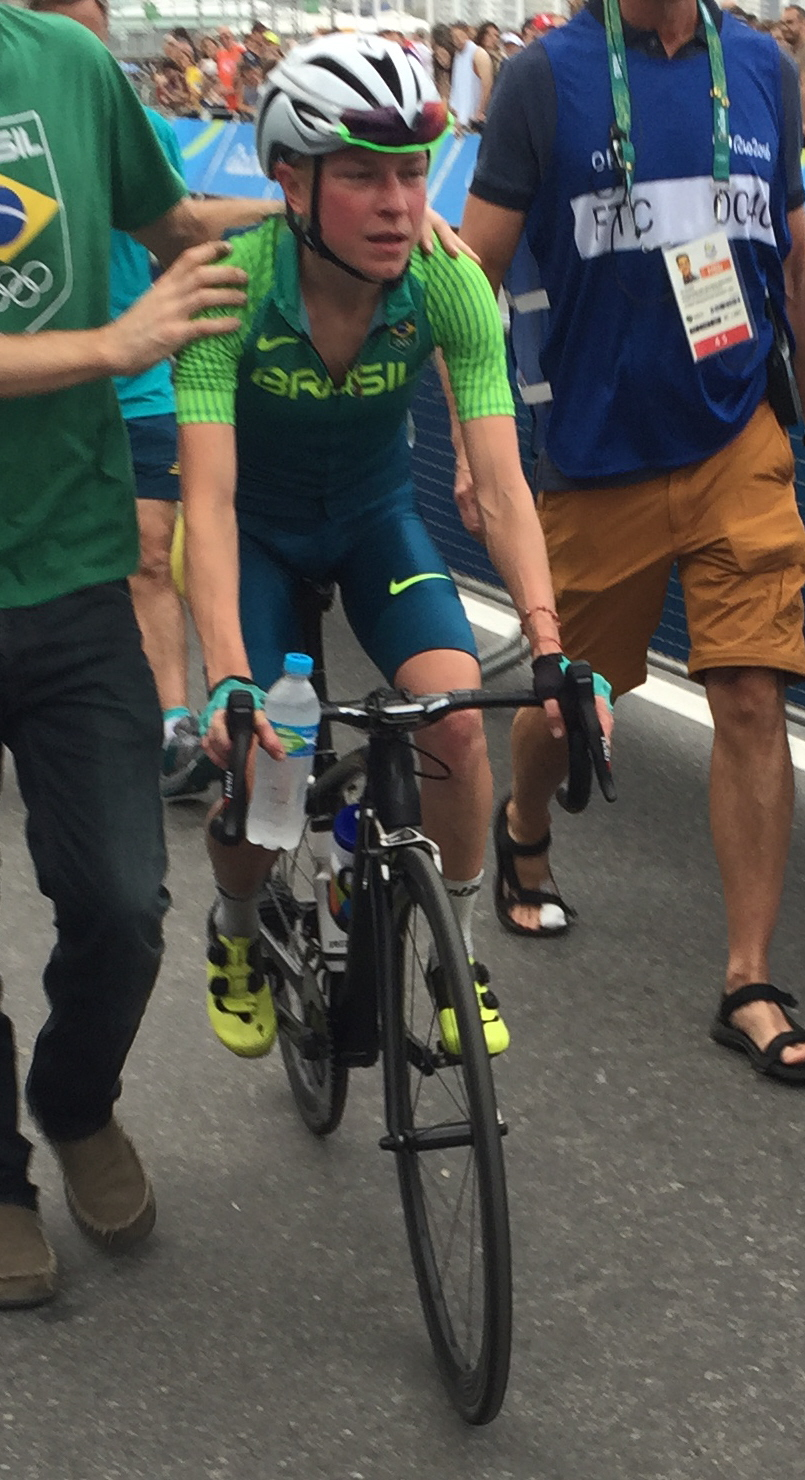
- Oliveira at the 2016 Summer Olympics

Personal information
- Full name: Flávia Maria de Oliveira Paparella
- Born: 27 October 1981 (age 44) Brazil
- Height: 157 cm (5 ft 2 in)
- Weight: 43 kg (95 lb)

Cycling career
- Sport: Cycling
- Current team: Força Aérea Brasileira
- Discipline: Road
- Role: Rider
- Rider type: Climber

Amateur teams
- 2007: Team Tibco
- 2008: Vanderkitten Racing
- 2008: Fenixs-Kutoa
- 2008: Metromint Cycling (Guest rider)
- 2008: Touchstone Climbing (Guest rider)
- 2011: Team PCW
- 2013: Swaboladies.nl
- 2014: DNA Cycling p/b K4Racing
- 2014: FCS Cycling Team (Guest rider)
- 2014: Louis Garneau Factory Team (Guest rider)
- 2014: Team Newton (Guest rider)
- 2015: Visit Dallas Cycling (Guest rider)
- 2016: Aprire Bicycles–HSS Hire (Guest rider)
- 2017–2019: Fearless Femme (Guest rider)
- 2020: ATX–Wolfpack p/b Jakroo

Professional teams
- 2009: SC Michela Fanini Record Rox
- 2010: Gauss Rdz Ormu
- 2011: Vaiano Solaristech
- 2012: Forno d'Asolo – Colavita
- 2013: GSD Gestion-Kallisto
- 2014: Firefighters Upsala CK
- 2014: Servetto Footon
- 2015: Alé–Cipollini
- 2015: Optum–KBS (Guest rider)
- 2016: Lensworld–Zannata
- 2016: BTC City Ljubljana (Guest rider)
- 2016–2017: Lares–Waowdeals
- 2018: Health Mate–Cyclelive Team
- 2019: Swapit–Agolíco
- 2019: Memorial–Santos
Medal record
Military World Games
Gold medal – first place	2015 Mungyeong	Team road race

Flávia Maria de Oliveira Paparella (born 27 October 1981) is a Brazilian racing cyclist. She competed in the 2013 UCI Women's World Championship Road Race in Florence, as well as the 2014 UCI Women's Road World Championships in Ponferrada. She competed at the 2016 Olympic Games in Rio de Janeiro where she finished in seventh place, the highest placed finish for a Brazilian rider in any Olympic cycling event.

Oliveira is a past winner of the mountains classification at the Giro d'Italia Femminile in 2015, the Brazilian National Road Race Championships, and she was the winner of the general and mountain classifications at the 2016 Tour Cycliste Féminin International de l'Ardèche.

During a coaching session early in Oliveira's career, she recorded one of the highest V̇O_{2} max scores ever across all athletics for females.

== Controls ==
In June 2009, in her first year as a professional, Oliveira tested positive for oxilofrine, a stimulant, while racing with the Italian professional team SC Michela Fanini at the Giro del Trentino Donne. The adverse finding came from a supplement purchased in the United States that did not include oxilofrine on the ingredients label. In fact, several supplement companies were making products that contained oxilofrine without indicating the substance on the label. Oliveira later sued the supplement manufacturer. In December 2009 the ban was reduced through an appeal to CAS after the panel found that she had not intentionally ingested the banned substance and there was no way that she could have known that the supplement would have contained a banned substance. This would see her resume competition on 1 March 2011.

A second positive occurred nine years later on 26 June 2018 at the Brazilian Road Championships. Oliveira won the race and was allowed to maintain the title of champion of Brasil after the hearing. In a unanimous decision, the arbitration panel ruled that Oliveira did not ingest the contaminant intentionally and in fact, the contaminant entered her system after the race had completed. Oliveira returned to racing shortly after, recording her best ever finish in a World Cup Event at GP Plouay, where she finished 8th.

In 2020, the prescribed use of vilanterol to treat an acute condition caused an adverse finding for Oliveira. Oliveira established she had no significant fault or negligence with respect to the violation. USADA granted a TUE to Oliveira for the medication after the fact. Additionally, WADA made the determination that vilanterol is not performance enhancing and removed it from the 2021 prohibited list when used as Oliveira did.

== 2020 Olympic Bid ==
While preparing for the 2020 Summer Olympics, Oliveira was struck by a car and suffered a broken pelvis. After rehabilitation, Oliveira collected enough Olympic qualification points to provisionally qualify her for the 2020 Tokyo Olympics. However, three weeks before the 2019 Road World Championships, Oliveira suffered a crash in the GP Fourmies in France that effectively ended her season.

== Major results ==
2007
1st Mount Diablo Hill Climb
4th Vacaville Gran Prix
5th Giro di San Francisco
7th Mount Tamalpais Hill Climb
7th Wente Vineyards Road Race
8th Berkeley Hills Road Race
9th Overall Mt. Hood Cycling Classic
2008
1st Overall California Cup
1st Mount Tamalpais Hill Climb
1st Stinson Beach Mt Tamalpais Hill Climb
1st Dunnigan Hills Road Race
1st San Ardo Road Race
1st Patterson Pass Road Race
2nd Santa Cruz University Road Race
2nd Suisun Harbor Criterium
2nd Berkeley Bicycle Club Criterium
3rd Mount Hamilton Classic
3rd Mount Diablo Hill Climb
4th Vacaville Gran Prix
5th Wente Vineyards Road Race
5th Giro di San Francisco
6th Norlund Construction, Inc. Corporate Criterium
6th Memorial Day Criterium
7th Merco Credit Union – Downtown Grand Prix
7th Davis 4th of July Criterium
2009
4th Overall Tour Féminin en Limousin
8th Giro del Friuli
9th Overall La Route de France
2011
2nd Mike's Bikes Cat's Hill Classic
3rd Overall Sea Otter Classic
National Road Championships

6th Time trial
7th Road race

7th Road race, Pan American Road Championships
9th Overall Giro della Toscana Int. Femminile – Memorial Michela Fanini
2012
2nd Nevada City Classic
3rd Road race, National Road Championships
3rd Overall Madera Stage Race
4th Snelling Road Race
4th Memorial Cesare Del Cancia
5th Berkeley Bicycle Club Criterium
7th Overall Merco Classic
7th Cherry Pie Criterium
7th Muri Fermani – Forza Marina – Gianmarco Lorenzi
7th San Rafael Twilight Criterium
2013
1st Wente Vineyards Road Race
1st Pescadero Coastal Classic
1st Mount Diablo Hill Climb
2nd Overall Sea Otter Classic
2nd Overall Volta do México Copa Governador
2nd Mount Hamilton Classic
National Road Championships

3rd Road race
4th Time trial

4th Berkeley Hills Road Race
5th Overall San Dimas Stage Race
6th San Rafael Twilight Criterium
7th Road race, Pan American Championships
7th Overall Cascade Cycling Classic
2014
National Road Championships

2nd Road race (Note: First place would later be disqualified from the race meaning that the National Championship was awarded to Oliveira)
9th Time trial

2nd Overall Vuelta Internacional Femenina a Costa Rica

1st Stage 1

2nd Overall Tour of the Gila
2nd Grand Prix de Oriente
2nd Grand Prix cycliste de Gatineau
4th Road race, Pan American Road Championships
4th Overall Vuelta Ciclista Femenina a El Salvador

1st Stage 3

5th Overall San Dimas Stage Race
5th Overall Redlands Bicycle Classic
5th Philadelphia Cycling Classic
7th Grand Prix GSB
2015
Military World Games

1st Team road race
7th Road race

2nd Overall Vuelta Internacional Femenina a Costa Rica

1st Stage 3 (ITT)

National Road Championships

3rd Road race
3rd Time trial

6th Overall Tour of California
7th Overall Tour Femenino de San Luis
7th Overall Giro d'Italia Femminile

1st Mountains classification

7th Overall Redlands Bicycle Classic
8th Overall San Dimas Stage Race
10th Overall Joe Martin Stage Race
10th Overall Tour of the Gila
2016
1st Overall classification Tour Cycliste Féminin International de l'Ardèche

1st Mountains classification
1st Stage 4

1st Mountains classification Tour de Feminin-O cenu Českého Švýcarska
2nd Overall Tour de Pologne Féminin

1st Stage 2 (ITT)

2nd Overall Giro della Toscana Int. Femminile – Memorial Michela Fanini
3rd Road race, Pan American Road Championships
3rd Overall Vuelta Internacional Femenina a Costa Rica

1st Stage 1 (ITT)

7th Road race, Olympic Games
9th Overall 4. NEA
2017
7th Overall Colorado Classic
10th Overall Tour Cycliste Féminin International de l'Ardèche
10th La Flèche Wallonne Féminine
2018
National Road Championships

1st Road race
3rd Time trial

2nd Overall Vuelta Femenina a Guatemala
6th Winston-Salem Cycling Classic
2019
National Road Championships

2nd Road race
2nd Time trial

3rd La Picto–Charentaise
6th Overall Colorado Classic
8th GP de Plouay – Bretagne
