= Susanna Zorzi =

Italian cyclist

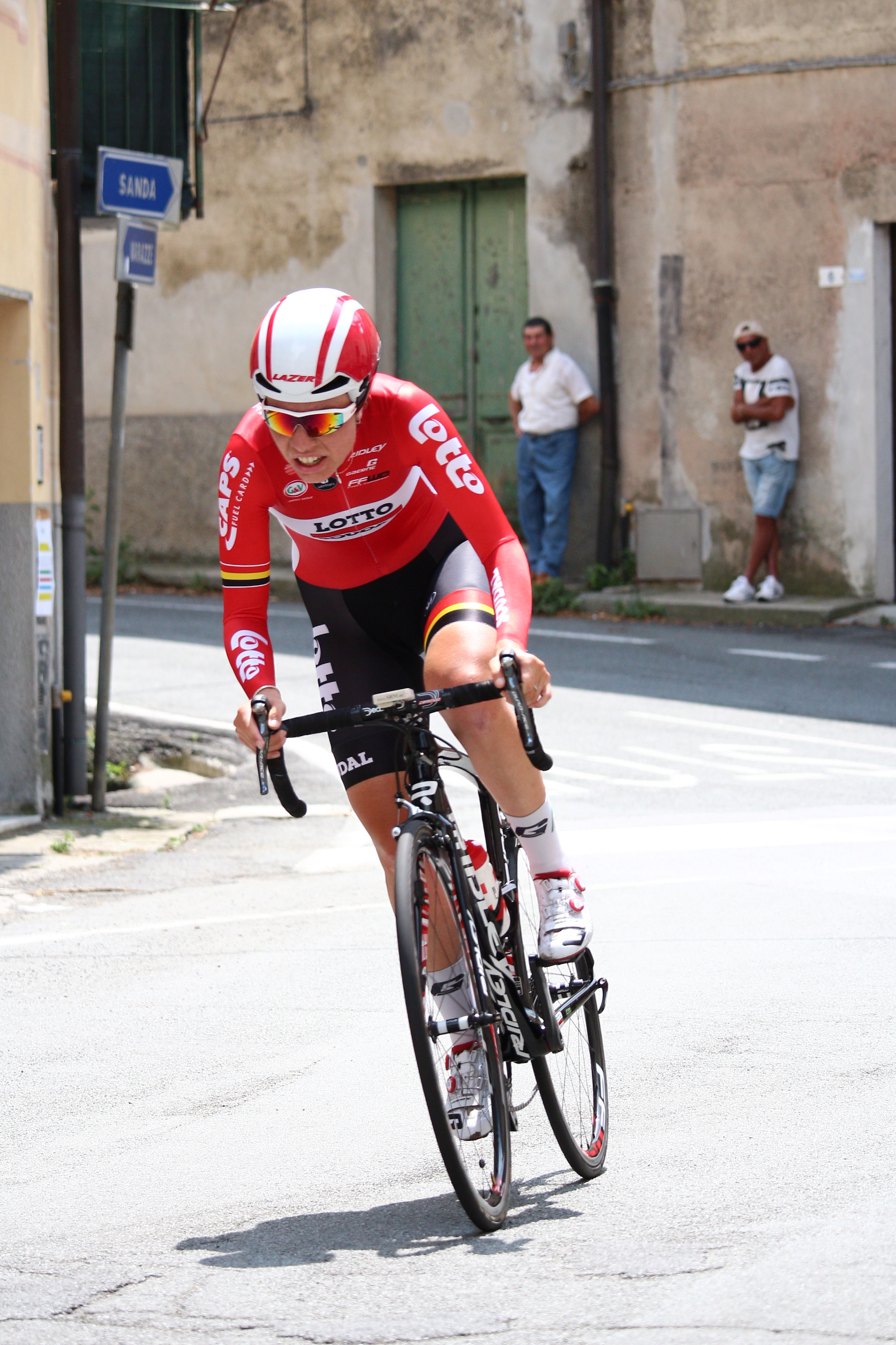
- Zorzi at the 2016 Giro d'Italia Femminile

Personal information
- Born: 13 March 1992 (age 34) Thiene, Italy

Cycling career
- Sport: Cycling
- Current team: Retired
- Discipline: Road
- Role: Rider

Professional teams
- 2011: Gauss
- 2012: MCipollini–Giambenini–Gauss
- 2013: Faren–Let's Go Finland
- 2014: Astana BePink Women Team
- 2015–2016: Lotto–Soudal Ladies
- 2017: Drops
- 2018: Experza–Footlogix

Susanna Zorzi (born 13 March 1992) is an Italian former racing cyclist.

== Major results ==
2009
3rd Road race, UCI Juniors World Championships
2010
5th Road race, UCI Juniors Road World Championships
2012
1st Stage 3 Trophée d'Or Féminin
10th Memorial Davide Fardelli
2013
1st Road race, UEC European Under-23 Road Championships
2014
3rd Team time trial, UCI Road World Championships
5th Overall The Women's Tour
5th Giro del Trentino Alto Adige-Südtirol
6th Time trial, UEC European Under-23 Road Championships
6th 7-Dorpenomloop Aalburg
8th Overall Tour de Bretagne Féminin
10th Overall Vuelta Internacional Femenina a Costa Rica

1st Young rider classification

2015
9th Gent–Wevelgem
2016
7th Overall Giro del Trentino Alto Adige-Südtirol
9th Omloop Het Nieuwsblad
2017
6th Cadel Evans Great Ocean Road Race
10th Overall Women's Tour Down Under

== See also ==
- 2014 Astana BePink Women's Team season
