= Elena Kuchinskaya =

Russian cyclist

Personal information
- Full name: Elena Kuchinskaya-Andreeva
- Born: Elena Kuchinskaya; 11 December 1984 (age 41): Taganrog, Russian SFSR, Soviet Union; (now Russia)

Cycling career
- Sport: Cycling
- Current team: Retired
- Discipline: Road
- Role: Rider

Professional teams
- 2006: Bianchi Alverti Kookai
- 2007: A.S. Team FRW
- 2010–2011: Gauss RDZ Ormu
- 2013–2014: RusVelo Women's Team
- 2015–2016: Servetto Footon

Elena Kuchinskaya-Andreeva (born 11 December 1984) is a Russian former racing cyclist. She participated between 2005 and 2014 at the UCI Road World Championships.

In 2007 Kuchinskaya was suspended for two years after she failed a drug test for furosemide doping.

== Major results ==
2007
National Road Championships

3rd Road race
3rd Time trial

9th Sparkassen Giro
2010
5th Overall Thüringen Rundfahrt der Frauen
2013
4th Overall Tour of Zhoushan Island
5th Overall Tour de Bretagne Féminin
6th Overall Tour of Adygeya

1st Mountains classification

2014
5th Overall Tour of Zhoushan Island
5th Grand Prix GSB
7th Overall Vuelta Internacional Femenina a Costa Rica
7th Grand Prix de Oriente
10th Grand Prix el Salvador
2015
2nd Overall Tour of Zhoushan Island
4th Overall Tour of Adygeya
5th Grand Prix of Maykop
2016
1st Overall Tour of Zhoushan Island

1st Mountains classification
1st Stage 2
