= Alexandra Burchenkova =

Russian road racing cyclist

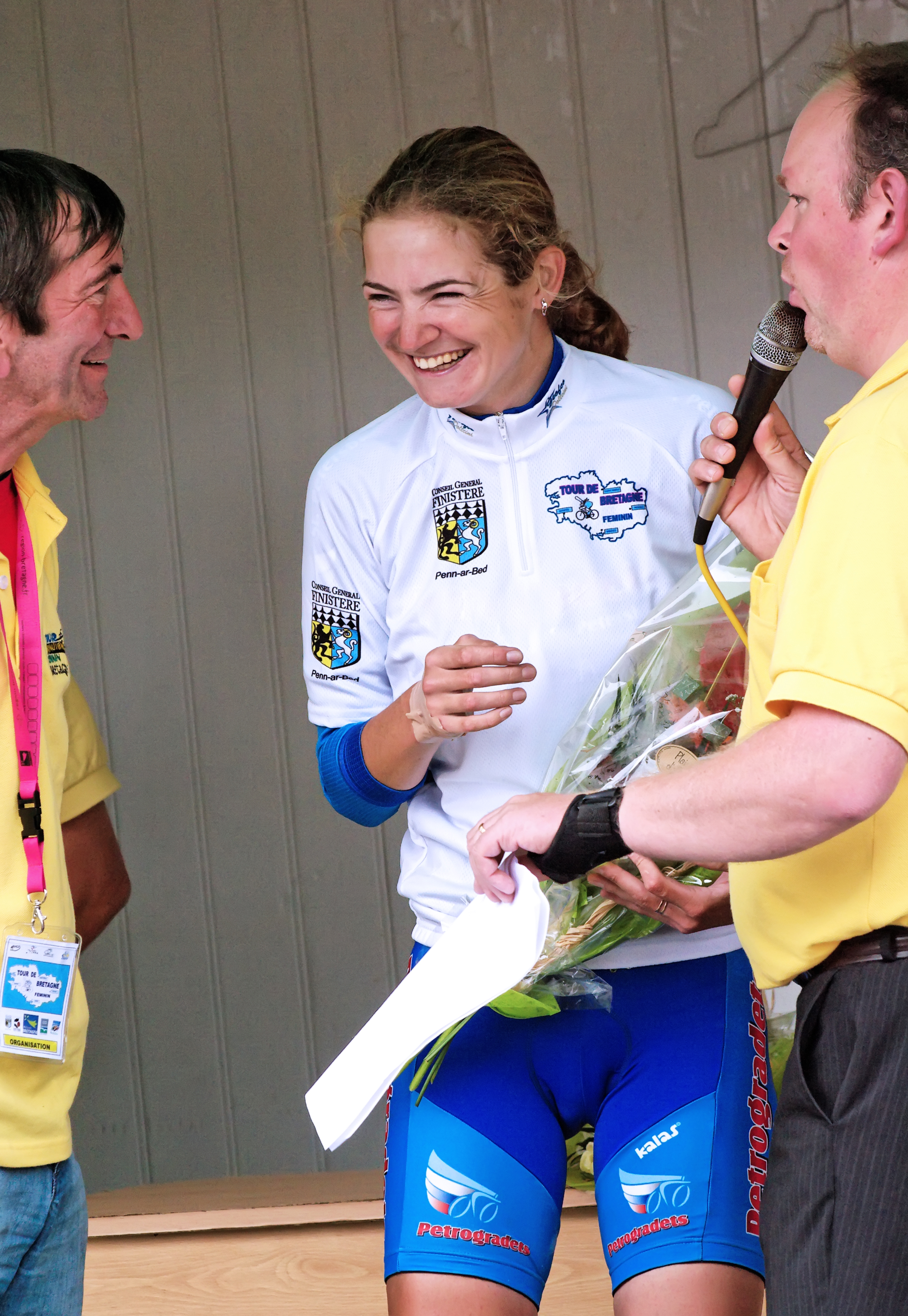
- Burchenkova at the 2009 Tour de Bretagne Féminin

Personal information
- Born: 16 September 1988 (age 38) Velikiye Luki, Russian SFSR

Cycling career
- Sport: Cycling
- Discipline: Road
- Role: Rider

Professional teams
- 2007–2009: Petrogradets
- 2010: Fenix–Petrogradets
- 2012: S.C. Michela Fanini–Rox
- 2013: Rusvelo Women Team

Alexandra Vasilyevna Burchenkova (Russian: Александра Васильевна Бурченкова; born 16 September 1988) is a Russian road racing cyclist.

Burchenkova participated at the 2008 Summer Olympics in the road race finishing 43rd. In 2010, she won a gold medal at the European Road Championships. In 2011, she won the Tour de Bretagne

Sporting positions
Preceded by Ellen van Dijk (NED)	U-23 European Road Champion (time trial); 2010	Succeeded by Mélodie Lesueur (FRA)
