= Olga Zabelinskaya =

Russian-born Uzbek cyclist

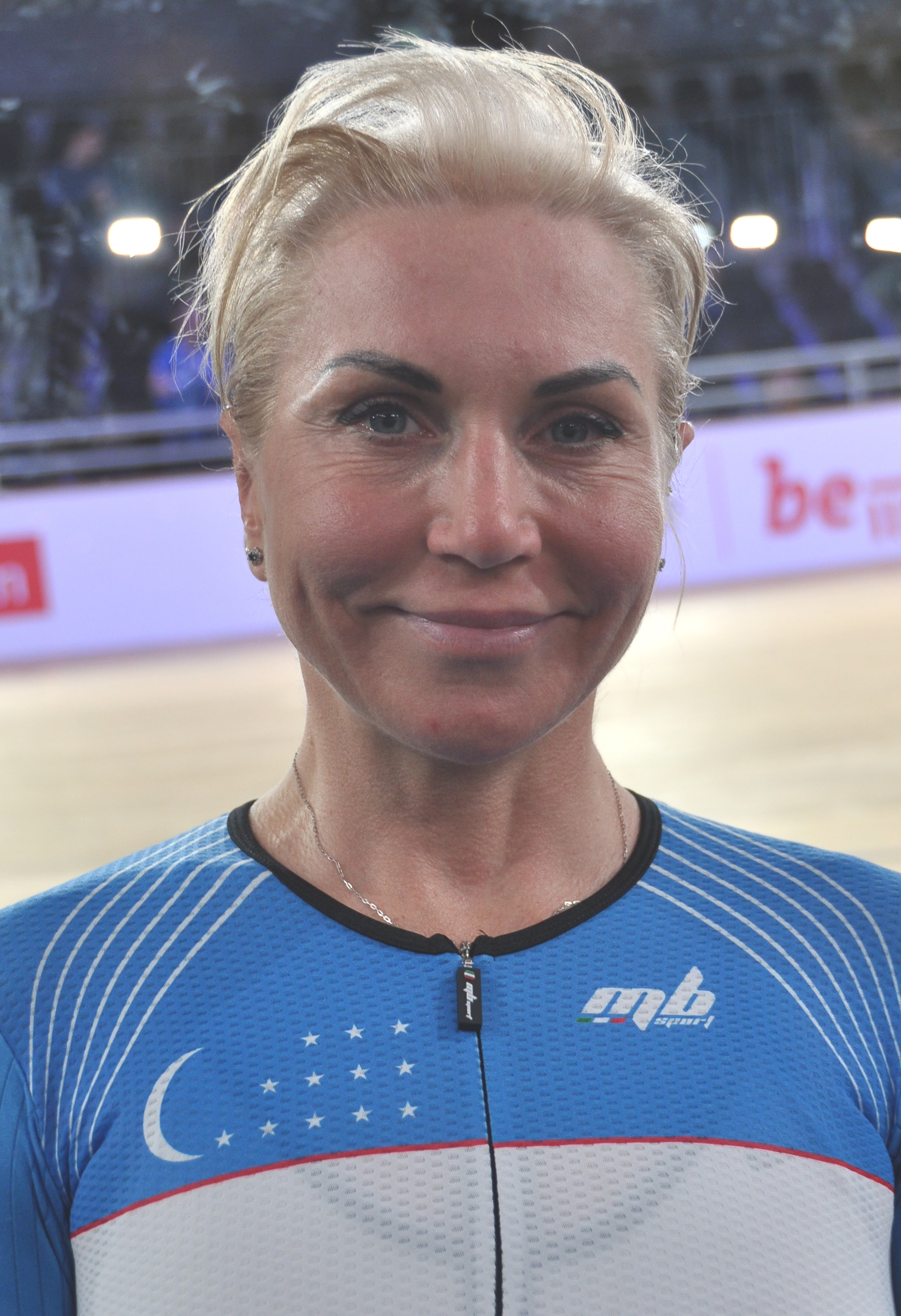
- Zabelinskaya in 2020

Personal information
- Full name: Olga Sergeyevna Zabelinskaya; Ольга Серге́евна Забелинская
- Born: 10 May 1980 (age 46): Leningrad, Russian SFSR, Soviet Union; (now Saint Petersburg, Russia)
- Height: 170 cm (5 ft 7 in)
- Weight: 61 kg (134 lb)

Cycling career
- Sport: Cycling
- Disciplines: Road; Track
- Role: Rider

Amateur teams
- 2010: Koga Miyata (guest)
- 2018: Velo Alanya Cycling Team (guest)

Professional teams
- 2001–2002: Carpe Diem–Itera
- 2003: Velodames–Colnago
- 2004: Equipe Nürnberger Versicherung
- 2006: Fenixs–Colnago
- 2010–2011: Safi–Pasta Zara
- 2012–2014: RusVelo
- 2016–2017: Bepink
- 2018–2022: Cogeas
- 2023–2024: Tashkent City Women Professional Cycling Team
Medal record
Representing Russia
Women's road bicycle racing
Olympic Games
Silver medal – second place	2016 Rio de Janeiro	Time trial
Bronze medal – third place	2012 London	Road race
Bronze medal – third place	2012 London	Time trial
World Championships
Gold medal – first place	1997 San Sebastián	Junior time trial
Silver medal – second place	1998 Valkenburg	Junior road race
Silver medal – second place	1998 Valkenburg	Junior time trial
European Championships
Gold medal – first place	2002 Bergamo	Under-23 time trial
Bronze medal – third place	2001 Apremont	Under-23 time trial
Bronze medal – third place	2016 Plumelec	Time trial
Bronze medal – third place	2017 Herning	Road race
Women's track cycling
Junior World Championships
Gold medal – first place	1997 Cape Town	Points race
Silver medal – second place	1998 Havana	Points race
Representing Uzbekistan
Women's road bicycle racing
Asian Games
Gold medal – first place	2022 Hangzhou	Time trial
Asian Championships
Gold medal – first place	2019 Tashkent	Road race
Gold medal – first place	2019 Tashkent	Time trial
Gold medal – first place	2023 Rayong	Time trial
Gold medal – first place	2024 Almaty	Time trial
Silver medal – second place	2023 Rayong	Team relay
Silver medal – second place	2024 Almaty	Mixed team relay
Islamic Solidarity Games
Gold medal – first place	2021 Konya	Road race
Gold medal – first place	2021 Konya	Time trial
Women's track cycling
Asian Championships
Gold medal – first place	2019 Jakarta	Points race
Gold medal – first place	2020 Jincheon	Points race
Silver medal – second place	2019 Jakarta	Individual pursuit
Silver medal – second place	2023 Nilai	Points race
Silver medal – second place	2024 New Delhi	Madison
Bronze medal – third place	2019 Jakarta	Madison
Bronze medal – third place	2019 Jakarta	Omnium
Bronze medal – third place	2023 Nilai	Madison
Islamic Solidarity Games
Gold medal – first place	2021 Konya	Points race

Olga Sergeyevna Zabelinskaya (also transliterated Zabelinskaia; Ольга Серге́евна Забелинская; born 10 May 1980) is a Russian-born Uzbekistani professional racing cyclist, who last rode for UCI Women's Continental Team Tashkent City Women Professional Cycling Team. While competing for Russia, she won three Olympic medals, before changing allegiances to Uzbekistan in 2018.

== Career ==
Born in Leningrad (now Saint Petersburg), Zabelinskaya twice became the junior world champion in 1997, in road and track individual races. She missed the 2004 Olympics because she was having a baby. In 2006, Zabelinskaya quit competitive cycling, but returned in 2009.

She qualified for the 2012 Summer Olympics in London, where she won bronze medals in both the road race and the time trial. Subsequently, she won a silver medal in the time trial at the 2016 Olympics. She is the first Russian female cyclist to win two Olympic medals in road events.

== Doping ==
In July 2014 it was reported that Zabelinskaya had tested positive for octopamine at an international race in the spring. In February 2016, she accepted an 18-month ban, which she already served and which expired in September 2015.

== Personal life ==
Zabelinskaya is the daughter of the Olympic champion former cyclist Sergei Sukhoruchenkov. She was separated from her father and they first met when Zabelinskaya was 16. She has three children. As of August 2012, she spends winters in Cyprus, where she trains, and summers in Saint Petersburg.

== Major results ==
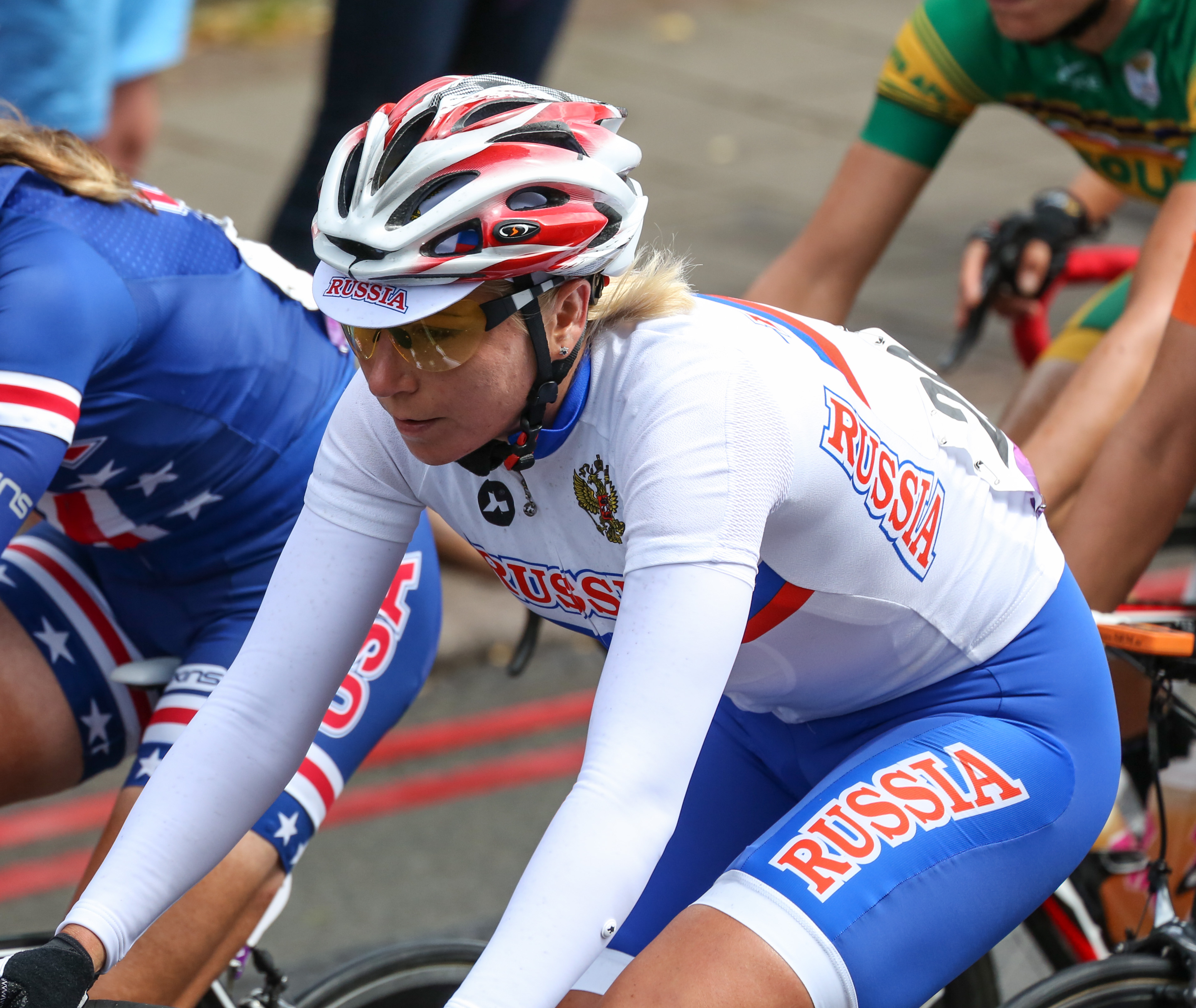
Zabelinskaya in 2012

1997
1st Time trial, UCI Junior Road World Championships
1st Points race, UCI Junior Track World Championships

1998
UCI Junior Road World Championships

2nd Road race
2nd Time trial

2nd Points race, UCI Junior Track World Championships

2001
3rd Time trial, UEC European Under-23 Road Championships
3rd Chrono Champenois-Trophée Européen
7th Trofeo Alfredo Binda-Comune di Cittiglio
7th Overall Tour de l'Aude Cycliste Féminin
9th Overall Giro d'Italia Femminile

2002
1st Time trial, UEC European Under-23 Road Championships

2003
3rd Overall Holland Ladies Tour
4th Overall Novilon Internationale Damesronde van Drenthe
5th Road race, UCI Road World Championships
9th Overall Grande Boucle Féminine Internationale

1st Stage 1 & 9

2006
1st Stage 7b Tour de l'Aude Cycliste Féminin

2010
1st Overall International Thüringen Rundfahrt der Frauen
National Road Championships

2nd Time trial
5th Road race

3rd Chrono Champenois – Trophée Européen
3rd Overall Route de France Féminine
4th Memorial Davide Fardelli
9th Overall Giro d'Italia Femminile
9th GP de Plouay
10th Trofeo Alfredo Binda

2011
National Road Championships

2nd Time trial
10th Road race

3rd Chrono des Nations
4th Chrono Champenois – Trophée Européen
5th Memorial Davide Fardelli
6th Open de Suède Vårgårda TTT
8th Trofeo Costa Etrusca
9th Overall Energiewacht Tour
9th Overall Iurreta-Emakumeen Bira
10th Trofeo Vannucci Alberto

2012
National Road Championships

1st Time trial
8th Road race

2nd Overall Giro del Trentino Alto Adige-Südtirol
2nd Celtic Chrono
Olympic Games

3rd Road Race
3rd Time Trial

3rd Chrono Champenois – Trophée Européen
5th Team time trial, UCI Road World Championships
8th National Road Race Championships
9th Overall Tour de Free State

2013
4th Team time trial
4th Chrono des Nations
5th Chrono Champenois – Trophée Européen
7th UCI Road World Championships – Women's time trial

2014
1st Overall Vuelta Femenina a Costa Rica

1st Stage 2 (ITT)

2016
2nd Time Trial, Olympic Games
2nd Overall Tour of Zhoushan Island
2nd Ljubljana–Domžale–Ljubljana
2nd Chrono Champenois – Trophée Européen
3rd Time trial, UEC European Road Championships
4th Overall Gracia–Orlová
4th UCI Road World Championships – Women's team time trial
4th UCI Road World Championships – Women's time trial
5th Time trial, National Road Championships
7th Overall Internationale Thüringen Rundfahrt der Frauen

1st Stage 2

7th Crescent Vårgårda TTT

2017
1st Points race, National Track Championships
UEC European Road Championships

3rd Road race
8th Time trial

4th Chrono des Nations
6th Overall Internationale Thüringen Rundfahrt der Frauen
8th Team time trial, UCI Road World Championships
8th Liège–Bastogne–Liège Femmes

2018
1st Time trial, National Road Championships
1st Overall The Princess Maha Chackri Sirindhorn's Cup "Women's Tour of Thailand"

1st Stage 1a (TTT)

1st Overall Tour of Eftalia Hotels & Velo Alanya

1st Prologue & Stage 1

1st Ljubljana–Domžale–Ljubljana TT
1st Chrono des Nations
2nd Overall Gracia–Orlová

1st Stage 3 (ITT)

2nd Chrono Champenois-Trophée Européen
3rd Omnium, Six Days of Bremen
7th Overall Emakumeen Euskal Bira
10th Durango-Durango Emakumeen Saria

2019
Asian Track Championships

1st Points race
2nd Individual pursuit
3rd Madison
3rd Omnium

Asian Road Championships

1st Road race
1st Time trial

National Road Championships

1st Road Race
1st Time Trial

1st Aphrodite Sanctuary Cycling Race
1st Aphrodite Cycling Race Individual Time Trial
2nd Chrono Kristin Armstrong
2nd Ljubljana-Domžale-Ljubljana
4th Grand Prix Justiniano Hotels
4th Grand Prix Alanya
4th Grand Prix Gazipasa
7th Chrono Champenois-Trophée Européen
10th Grand Prix Velo Alanya
2021
1st Grand Prix Kayseri
1st Germenica Grand Prix Road Race
2nd Grand Prix Gündoğmuş
8th Kahramanmaraş Grand Prix Road Race
9th Road race, Olympic Games
10th Grand Prix Velo Alanya
2022
Islamic Solidarity Games
1st Road race
1st Time trial
2023
1st The Tour Oqtosh - Chorvoq - Mountain Ladies
Asian Road Championships

1st Time trial
2nd Mixed relay
7th Road race

2nd Tour of Bostonliq I Ladies
2nd Tour of Bostonliq II Ladies
2nd Aphrodite Cycling Race Individual Time Trial
4th Aphrodite Cycling Race - Women for future
4th The Tour Oqtosh - Chorvoq - Mountain Ladies II
5th Umag Trophy Ladies
8th Poreč Trophy Ladies
8th Aphrodite Cycling Race - RR
2024
Asian Road Championships

1st Time trial
2nd Mixed relay
