= 2014 Astana BePink Women's Team season =

2015 Astana BePink Women's Team
- Manager: Walter Zini
- Main sponsor(s): Astana BePink
- Based: Italy

Season victories
- One-day races: 1
- Stage race overall: –
- Stage race stages: 5

The 2014 women's road cycling season was the third for the Astana BePink Women's Team cycling team, which began as Be Pink in 2012.

== Team roster ==
Ages as of 1 January 2014 As of April 2014.

| Rider | Date of birth |
|---|---|
| Alice Algisi (ITA) | March 10, 1993 (aged 20) |
| Alena Amialiusik (BLR) | February 6, 1989 (aged 24) |
| Alice Maria Arzuffi (ITA) | November 19, 1994 (aged 19) |
| Ana Maria Covrig (ITA) | August 12, 1994 (aged 19) |
| Michela Maltese (ITA) | April 20, 1995 (aged 18) |
| Simona Frapporti (ITA) | July 14, 1988 (aged 25) |
| Anna Zita Maria Stricker (ITA) | July 3, 1994 (aged 19) |

| Rider | Date of birth |
|---|---|
| Dalia Muccioli (ITA) | May 22, 1993 (aged 20) |
| Susanna Zorzi (ITA) | March 13, 1992 (aged 21) |
| Doris Schweizer (SUI) | August 28, 1989 (aged 24) |
| Silvia Valsecchi (ITA) | July 19, 1982 (aged 31) |
| Marzahan Baitleuova (KAZ) | March 12, 1994 (aged 19) |
| Kseniia Dobrynina (RUS) | January 11, 1994 (aged 19) |
| Mahabbat Umutzhanova (KAZ) | August 11, 1994 (aged 19) |

Riders who joined the team for the 2014 season

| Rider | 2013 team |
|---|---|
| Alice Maria Arzuffi (ITA) | Faren–Let's Go Finland |
| Marzhan Baitleuova (KAZ) | |
| Ana Covrig (ITA) | |
| Kseniya Dobrynina (RUS) | RusVelo |
| Michela Maltese (ITA) | |
| Anna Maria Stricker (ITA) | MCipollini–Giordana |
| Makhabbat Umutzhanova (KAZ) | |
| Susanna Zorzi (ITA) | Faren–Let's Go Finland |

Riders who left the team during or after the 2013 season

| Rider | 2014 team |
|---|---|
| Chiara Favaron Bissoli (ITA) | |
| Noemi Cantele (ITA) | Retired |
| Giulia Donato (ITA) | |
| Daniela Levi (ISR) | |
| Ilaria Sanguineti (ITA) | |
| Małgorzata Wojtyra (POL) | |
| Petra Zrimšek (SLO) | |

== Season victories ==
| Date | Race | Cat. | Rider | Country | Location |
|---|---|---|---|---|---|
| 1 March | Vuelta Internacional Femenina a Costa Rica, Stage 4 | 2.2 | Alena Amialiusik (BLR) | Costa Rica | Grecia |
| 2 March | Vuelta Internacional Femenina a Costa Rica, Mountains classification | 2.2 | Alena Amialiusik (BLR) | Costa Rica | |
| 2 March | Vuelta Internacional Femenina a Costa Rica, Young rider classification | 2.2 | Susanna Zorzi (ITA) | Costa Rica | |
| 8 March | Grand Prix el Salvador | 1.1 | Alena Amialiusik (BLR) | El Salvador | Zaragoza |
| 12 March | Vuelta a El Salvador, Stage 1 | 2.1 | Alena Amialiusik (BLR) | El Salvador | Nahuizalco |
| 13 March | Vuelta a El Salvador, Stage 2 | 2.1 | Alena Amialiusik (BLR) | El Salvador | Olocuilta |
| 16 March | Vuelta a El Salvador, Points classification | 2.1 | Anna Zita Maria Stricker (ITA) | El Salvador | |
| 16 March | Vuelta a El Salvador, Mountains classification | 2.1 | Alena Amialiusik (BLR) | El Salvador | |
| 16 March | Vuelta a El Salvador, Young rider Classification | 2.1 | Dalia Muccioli (ITA) | El Salvador | |
| 16 March | Vuelta a El Salvador, Teams classification | 2.1 | (Note: The riders on the squad were Alena Amialiusik, Dalia Muccioli, Doris Schweizer, Anna Zita Maria Stricker, Silvia Valsecchi and Susanna Zorzi) | El Salvador | |
| 17 July | Tour de Bretagne Féminin, Stage 1 | 2.2 | Doris Schweizer (SUI) | France | Saint-Méen-le-Grand |
| 5 September | Tour Cycliste Féminin International de l'Ardèche, Stage 5 | 2.2 | Alena Amialiusik (BLR) | France | Villeneuve-de-Berg |
| 7 September | Tour Cycliste Féminin International de l'Ardèche, Teams classification | 2.2 | (Note: The riders on the squad were Alena Amialiusik, Alice Maria Arzuffi, Dalia Muccioli, Ksenyia Tuhai, Doris Schweizer and Silvia Valsecchi) | France | |
