= 2017 Tour of Chongming Island =

2017 UCI Women's World Tour, race 9 of 20

Race details
- Dates: 5–7 May 2017
- Stages: 3
- Distance: 365.8 km (227.3 mi)
- Winning time: 9h 24' 09"

Results
Jersey awarded to the overall winner	Winner	Jolien D'Hoore (BEL)	(Wiggle High5)
	Second	Kirsten Wild (NED)	(Cylance Pro Cycling)
	Third	Chloe Hosking (AUS)	(Alé–Cipollini)
Jersey awarded to the points classification winner	Points	Chloe Hosking (AUS)	(Alé–Cipollini)
Jersey awarded to the mountains classification winner	Mountains	Jolien D'Hoore (BEL)	(Wiggle High5)
Jersey awarded to the youth classification winner	Youth	Maria Vittoria Sperotto (ITA)	(Bepink–Cogeas)
	Team	Alé–Cipollini	

The 2017 Tour of Chongming Island was the eleventh staging of the Tour of Chongming Island, a women's stage race held in Shanghai, China. It ran from 5 to 7 May 2017 and was held as part of the 2017 UCI Women's World Tour.

The race was won for the first time by Wiggle High5's Jolien D'Hoore, ahead of two-time race winners Kirsten Wild (Cylance Pro Cycling) and Chloe Hosking of Alé–Cipollini.

== Teams ==
18 teams contested the race.

UCI Women's Teams

- Alé–Cipollini
- Astana
- Bepink–Cogeas
- BTC City Ljubljana
- China Chongming–Liv
- Cylance Pro Cycling
- Team Hitec Products
- Minsk Cycling Club
- Orica–Scott
- Servetto Giusta
- Tibco–Silicon Valley Bank
- Wiggle High5
- WM3 Energie
- Team VéloCONCEPT

National teams

- Hong Kong
- Malaysia
- Russia
- Taiwan

== Schedule ==
List of stages
Stage	Date	Course	Distance	Type	Winner
1	5 May	Xincheng Park to Xincheng Park	118.8 km (73.8 mi)	Flat stage	Kirsten Wild (NED)
2	6 May	Xincheng Park to Xincheng Park	135.4 km (84.1 mi)	Flat stage	Jolien D'Hoore (BEL)
3	7 May	Xincheng Park to Xincheng Park	111.6 km (69.3 mi)	Flat stage	Jolien D'Hoore (BEL)
Total			365.8 km (227.3 mi)		

== Stages ==
=== Stage 1 ===
5 May 2017 — Xincheng Park to Xincheng Park, 118.8 km (73.8 mi)

Stage 1 result
Rank	Rider	Team	Time
1	Kirsten Wild (NED)	Cylance Pro Cycling	3h 03' 40"
2	Chloe Hosking (AUS)	Alé–Cipollini	+ 0"
3	Sarah Roy (AUS)	Orica–Scott	+ 0"
4	Annette Edmondson (AUS)	Wiggle High5	+ 0"
5	Marta Bastianelli (ITA)	Alé–Cipollini	+ 0"
6	Maria Vittoria Sperotto (ITA)	Bepink–Cogeas	+ 0"
7	Alison Jackson (CAN)	Bepink–Cogeas	+ 0"
8	Arianna Fidanza (ITA)	Astana	+ 0"
9	Christina Siggaard (DEN)	Team VéloCONCEPT	+ 0"
10	Jolien D'Hoore (BEL)	Wiggle High5	+ 0"

General classification after Stage 1
Rank	Rider	Team	Time
1	Chloe Hosking (AUS)	Alé–Cipollini	3h 03' 29"
2	Kirsten Wild (NED)	Cylance Pro Cycling	+ 1"
3	Sarah Roy (AUS)	Orica–Scott	+ 7"
4	Jolien D'Hoore (BEL)	Wiggle High5	+ 8"
5	Maria Vittoria Sperotto (ITA)	Bepink–Cogeas	+ 9"
6	Annette Edmondson (AUS)	Wiggle High5	+ 10"
7	Emilie Moberg (NOR)	Team Hitec Products	+ 10"
8	Marta Bastianelli (ITA)	Alé–Cipollini	+ 11"
9	Alison Jackson (CAN)	Bepink–Cogeas	+ 11"
10	Arianna Fidanza (ITA)	Astana	+ 11"

=== Stage 2 ===
6 May 2017 — Xincheng Park to Xincheng Park, 135.4 km (84.1 mi)

Stage 2 result
Rank	Rider	Team	Time
1	Jolien D'Hoore (BEL)	Wiggle High5	3h 32' 25"
2	Kirsten Wild (NED)	Cylance Pro Cycling	+ 0"
3	Anna Zita Maria Stricker (ITA)	BTC City Ljubljana	+ 0"
4	Chloe Hosking (AUS)	Alé–Cipollini	+ 0"
5	Emilie Moberg (NOR)	Team Hitec Products	+ 0"
6	Marta Bastianelli (ITA)	Alé–Cipollini	+ 0"
7	Maria Vittoria Sperotto (ITA)	Bepink–Cogeas	+ 0"
8	Christina Siggaard (DEN)	Team VéloCONCEPT	+ 0"
9	Anna Trevisi (ITA)	Alé–Cipollini	+ 0"
10	Jeanne Korevaar (NED)	WM3 Energie	+ 0"

General classification after Stage 2
Rank	Rider	Team	Time
1	Jolien D'Hoore (BEL)	Wiggle High5	6h 35' 48"
2	Kirsten Wild (NED)	Cylance Pro Cycling	+ 1"
3	Chloe Hosking (AUS)	Alé–Cipollini	+ 3"
4	Anna Zita Maria Stricker (ITA)	BTC City Ljubljana	+ 13"
5	Sarah Roy (AUS)	Orica–Scott	+ 13"
6	Emilie Moberg (NOR)	Team Hitec Products	+ 14"
7	Maria Vittoria Sperotto (ITA)	Bepink–Cogeas	+ 15"
8	Christina Siggaard (DEN)	Team VéloCONCEPT	+ 15"
9	Annette Edmondson (AUS)	Wiggle High5	+ 16"
10	Jelena Erić (SRB)	BTC City Ljubljana	+ 16"

=== Stage 3 ===
7 May 2017 — Xincheng Park to Xincheng Park, 111.6 km (69.3 mi)

Stage 3 result
Rank	Rider	Team	Time
1	Jolien D'Hoore (BEL)	Wiggle High5	2h 48' 31"
2	Kirsten Wild (NED)	Cylance Pro Cycling	+ 0"
3	Chloe Hosking (AUS)	Alé–Cipollini	+ 0"
4	Sarah Roy (AUS)	Orica–Scott	+ 0"
5	Jelena Erić (SRB)	BTC City Ljubljana	+ 0"
6	Kendall Ryan (USA)	Tibco–Silicon Valley Bank	+ 0"
7	Simona Frapporti (ITA)	Team Hitec Products	+ 0"
8	Emilie Moberg (NOR)	Team Hitec Products	+ 0"
9	Arianna Fidanza (ITA)	Astana	+ 0"
10	Daniela Gass (GER)	Servetto Giusta	+ 0"

Final general classification
Rank	Rider	Team	Time
1	Jolien D'Hoore (BEL)	Wiggle High5	9h 24' 09"
2	Kirsten Wild (NED)	Cylance Pro Cycling	+ 5"
3	Chloe Hosking (AUS)	Alé–Cipollini	+ 6"
4	Sarah Roy (AUS)	Orica–Scott	+ 23"
5	Christina Siggaard (DEN)	Team VéloCONCEPT	+ 23"
6	Anna Zita Maria Stricker (ITA)	BTC City Ljubljana	+ 23"
7	Emilie Moberg (NOR)	Team Hitec Products	+ 24"
8	Kseniya Dobrynina (RUS)	Servetto Giusta	+ 24"
9	Maria Vittoria Sperotto (ITA)	Bepink–Cogeas	+ 25"
10	Annette Edmondson (AUS)	Wiggle High5	+ 25"

== Classification leadership table ==
In the 2017 Tour of Chongming Island, five different jerseys were awarded. The most important was the general classification, which was calculated by adding each cyclist's finishing times on each stage. Time bonuses were awarded to the first three finishers on all mass-start stages: the stage winner won a ten-second bonus, with six and four seconds for the second and third riders respectively. The rider with the least accumulated time is the race leader, identified by a yellow jersey. This classification was considered the most important of the 2017 Tour of Chongming Island, and the winner of the classification was considered the winner of the race.

There was also a mountains classification, the leadership of which was marked by a polkadot jersey. In the mountains classification, points towards the classification were won by reaching the top of a climb before other cyclists. Additionally, there was a points classification, which awarded a green jersey. In the points classification, cyclists received points for finishing in the top 10 in a stage.

The fourth jersey represented the young rider classification, marked by a white jersey. This was decided the same way as the general classification, but only riders born on or after 1 January 1995 were eligible to be ranked in the classification, in line with the young rider classification of all UCI Women's World Tour events. The fifth and final jersey represented the classification for Chinese riders, marked by a blue jersey. This was decided the same way as the general classification, but only riders born in China were eligible to be ranked in the classification. There was also a team classification, in which the times of the best three cyclists per team on each stage were added together; the leading team at the end of the race was the team with the lowest total time.

Classification leadership by stage
Stage	Winner	General classification	Points classification	Mountains classification	Young rider classification	Chinese rider classification	Team classification
1	Kirsten Wild	Chloe Hosking	Chloe Hosking	Mia Radotić	Maria Vittoria Sperotto	Zhao Xisha	Alé–Cipollini
2	Jolien D'Hoore	Jolien D'Hoore	Chloe Hosking	Jolien D'Hoore	Maria Vittoria Sperotto	Zhao Xisha	Alé–Cipollini
3	Jolien D'Hoore	Jolien D'Hoore	Chloe Hosking	Jolien D'Hoore	Maria Vittoria Sperotto	Pu Yixian	Alé–Cipollini
Final		Jolien D'Hoore	Chloe Hosking	Jolien D'Hoore	Maria Vittoria Sperotto	Pu Yixian	Alé–Cipollini
