= 2019 UEC European Track Championships (under-23 & junior) =

European Championship

- Venue: Ghent
- Date(s): 9–14 July
- Velodrome: Vlaams Wielercentrum Eddy Merckx
- Nations participating: 25
- Cyclists participating: 425
- Events: 44

The 2019 UEC European Track Championships (under-23 & junior) was the 19th continental championships for European under-23 and junior track cyclists, and the 10th since the event was renamed following the reorganisation of European track cycling in 2010. The event took place at the Vlaams Wielercentrum Eddy Merckx in Ghent, Belgium from 9 to 14 July 2019.

== Medal summary ==
=== Under-23 ===
Event	Gold		Silver		Bronze	
Men's events
Sprint	Harrie Lavreysen; Netherlands		Sébastien Vigier; France		Rayan Helal; France	
Team sprint	Netherlands; Koen van der Wijst; Harrie Lavreysen; Sam Ligtlee	43.783	France; Melvin Landerneau; Sébastien Vigier; Rayan Helal; Florian Grengbo	44.031	Russia; Daniil Komkov; Alexey Nosov; Pavel Rostov; Dmitry Nesterov	44.223
1 km time trial	Anton Höhne; Germany	1:01.571	Melvin Landerneau; France	1:01.624	Jiří Janošek; Czech Republic	1:01.826
Keirin	Sébastien Vigier; France		Harrie Lavreysen; Netherlands		Rayan Helal; France	
Individual pursuit	Felix Groß; Germany	4:12.895	Ivan Smirnov; Russia	4:16.049	Lev Gonov; Russia	4:17.816
Team pursuit	Russia; Ivan Smirnov; Gleb Syritsa; Dmitry Mukhomediarov; Lev Gonov; Nikita Bersenev	3:53.843	Belgium; Fabio Van den Bossche; Robbe Ghys; Gerben Thijssen; Sasha Weemaes	3:59.100	Switzerland; Robin Froidevaux; Valère Thiébaud; Mauro Schmid; Alex Vogel	3:56.963
Points race	Richard Banusch; Germany	71 Points	Valère Thiébaud; Switzerland	59 Points	Savva Novikov; Russia	38 Points
Scratch	Moritz Malcharek; Germany		Daniel Babor; Czech Republic		Aurélien Costeplane; France	
Madison	Great Britain; Matthew Walls; Fred Wright	49 Points	France; Donavan Grondin; Thomas Denis	31 Points	Switzerland; Robin Froidevaux; Mauro Schmid	29 Points
Omnium	Matthew Walls; Great Britain	138 Points	Donavan Grondin; France	118 Points	Moritz Malcharek; Germany	113 Points
Elimination race	Jules Hesters; Belgium		Miguel Do Rego; Portugal		Vladislav Shcherban; Ukraine	
Women's events
Sprint	Mathilde Gros; France		Lea Sophie Friedrich; Germany		Miriam Vece; Italy	
Team sprint	Poland; Marlena Karwacka; Nikola Sibiak	33.870	Netherlands; Hetty van de Wouw; Steffie van der Peet	34.024	Great Britain; Milly Tanner; Blaine Ridge-Davis	33.962
500 m time trial	Lea Sophie Friedrich; Germany	33.635	Miriam Vece; Italy	34.046	Mathilde Gros; France	34.442
Keirin	Lea Sophie Friedrich; Germany		Steffie van der Peet; Netherlands		Hetty van de Wouw; Netherlands	
Individual pursuit	Franziska Brauße; Germany	3:29.538	Vittoria Guazzini; Italy	3:34.743	Maria Novolodskaya; Russia	3:34.041
Team pursuit	Italy; Letizia Paternoster; Marta Cavalli; Elisa Balsamo; Vittoria Guazzini; Martina Alzini	4:15.915	France; Clara Copponi; Valentine Fortin; Marion Borras; Marie Le Net	4:19.593	Germany; Franziska Brauße; Laura Süßemilch; Lena Charlotte Reißner; Michaela Ebert	
Points race	Natalia Studenikina; Russia	75 Points	Wiktoria Pikulik; Poland	61 Points	Shari Bossuyt; Belgium	51 Points
Scratch	Daria Malkova; Russia		Oksana Kliachina; Ukraine		Daria Pikulik; Poland	
Madison	Italy; Letizia Paternoster; Elisa Balsamo	37 Points	Poland; Daria Pikulik; Wiktoria Pikulik	23 Points	Russia; Maria Miliaeva; Maria Novolodskaya	21 Points
Omnium	Jessica Roberts; Great Britain	136 Points	Clara Copponi; France	119 Points	Daria Pikulik; Poland	113 Points
Elimination race	Letizia Paternoster; Italy		Maria Martins; Portugal		Shari Bossuyt; Belgium	

=== Junior ===
Event	Gold		Silver		Bronze	
Men's events
Sprint	Konstantinos Livanos; Greece		Julien Jäger; Germany		Daan Kool; Netherlands	
Team sprint	Germany; Domenic Kruse; Laurin Drescher; Julien Jäger	45.526	Poland; Konrad Burawski; Szymon Welens; Mateusz Sztrauch	45.756	Netherlands; Tijmen van Loon; Daan Kool; Gino Knies	45.862
1 km time trial	Konstantinos Livanos; Greece	1:01.825	Daan Kool; Netherlands	1:01.827	Matteo Bianchi; Italy	1:02.222
Keirin	Julien Jäger; Germany		Ivan Gladyshev; Russia		Daan Kool; Netherlands	
Individual pursuit	Nicolas Heinrich; Germany	3:12.884	Tobias Buck-Gramcko; Germany	3:13.937	Leo Hayter; Great Britain	3:16.197
Team pursuit	Great Britain; Max Rushby; Alfie George; Samuel Watson; Leo Hayter; Oscar Nilsson-Julien	4:01.338	Russia; Egor Igoshev; Ivan Novolodsky; Evgeny Poludenko; Ilia Schegolkov; Vlas Shichkin	4:03.334	Germany; Hannes Wilksch; Tobias Buck-Gramcko; Nicolas Heinrich; Pierre-Pascal Keup; Moritz Kretschy	4:01.680
Points race	Vlas Shichkin; Russia	80 Points	Enzo Leijnse; Netherlands	45 Points	Hannes Wilksch; Germany	39 Points
Scratch	Denis Denisov; Russia		Tim Wafler; Austria		Raúl García Pierna; Spain	
Madison	Russia; Ilia Schegolkov; Vlas Shichkin	56 Points	Netherlands; Enzo Leijnse; Casper van Uden	45 Points	Germany; Luca Dressler; Tim Torn Teutenberg	35 Points
Omnium	Casper van Uden; Netherlands	118 Points	Szymon Potasznik; Poland	109 Points	Javier Serrano; Spain	106 Points
Elimination race	Tim Torn Teutenberg; Germany		Panagiotis Karatsivis; Greece		Luboš Komínek; Czech Republic	
Women's events
Sprint	Alessa-Catriona Pröpster; Germany		Emma Finucane; Great Britain		Marie-Divine Taky Kouame; France	
Team sprint	Poland; Nikola Seremak; Nikola Wielowska	34.718	Great Britain; Emma Finucane; Charlotte Robinson	35.166	Germany; Christina Sperlich; Alessa-Catriona Pröpster	35.133
500 m time trial	Emma Finucane; Great Britain	35.563	Alessa-Catriona Pröpster; Germany	35.658	Marie-Divine Taky Kouame; France	35.917
Keirin	Alessa-Catriona Pröpster; Germany		Nikola Seremak; Poland		Marie-Divine Taky Kouame; France	
Individual pursuit	Elynor Bäckstedt; Great Britain	2:18.288	Lara Gillespie; Ireland	2:21.579	Camilla Alessio; Italy	2:23.359
Team pursuit	Italy; Eleonora Camilla Gasparrini; Camilla Alessio; Giorgia Catarzi; Sofia Collinelli; Matilde Vitillo	4:26.951	Great Britain; Elynor Bäckstedt; Sophie Lewis; Ella Barnwell; Eluned King; Amelia Sharpe	4:35.777	Germany; Finja Smekal; Hanna Dopjans; Paula Leonhardt; Friederike Stern; Hannah Buch	4:34.622
Points race	Matilde Vitillo; Italy	32 Points	Lara Gillespie; Ireland	21 Points	Maike van der Duin; Netherlands	13 Points
Scratch	Nikola Wielowska; Poland		Lara Gillespie; Ireland		Maike van der Duin; Netherlands	
Madison	Great Britain; Elynor Bäckstedt; Sophie Lewis	29 Points	Netherlands; Daniek Hengeveld; Maike van der Duin	21 Points	Italy; Eleonora Camilla Gasparrini; Sofia Collinelli	20 Points
Omnium	Eleonora Camilla Gasparrini; Italy	146 Points	Ella Barnwell; Great Britain	119 Points	Maria Miliaeva; Russia	100 Points
Elimination race	Daniek Hengeveld; Netherlands		Amelia Sharpe; Great Britain		Taisia Churenkova; Russia	

=== Notes ===
- Competitors named in italics only participated in rounds prior to the final.

== Medal table ==
Rank	Nation	Gold	Silver	Bronze	Total
1	Germany (GER)	13	4	7	24
2	Great Britain (GBR)	7	5	2	14
3	Russia (RUS)	6	3	7	16
4	Italy (ITA)	6	2	4	12
5	Netherlands (NED)	4	7	6	17
6	Poland (POL)	3	5	2	10
7	France (FRA)	2	7	7	16
8	Greece (GRE)	2	1	0	3
9	Belgium (BEL)	1	1	2	4
10	Ireland (IRL)	0	3	0	3
11	Portugal (POR)	0	2	0	2
12	Czech Republic (CZE)	0	1	2	3
12	Switzerland (SUI)	0	1	2	3
14	Ukraine (UKR)	0	1	1	2
15	Austria (AUT)	0	1	0	1
16	Spain (ESP)	0	0	2	2
Totals (16 entries)		44	44	44	132
