= 2013 Giro del Trentino Alto Adige-Südtirol =

Race details
- Dates: 15–16 June 2012
- Stages: 3
- Distance: 203.9 km (126.7 mi)

Results
| | Winner | Evelyn Stevens (USA) | (Team Specialized–lululemon) |
| | Second | Tatiana Guderzo (ITA) | (MCipollini–Giordana) |
| | Third | Tatiana Antoshina (RUS) | (MCipollini–Giordana) |
| | Points | Evelyn Stevens (USA) | (Team Specialized–lululemon) |
| | Mountains | Rossella Ratto (ITA) | (Hitec Products UCK) |

The 2013 Giro del Trentino Alto Adige-Südtirol is a women's cycling stage race in Italy. It was rated by the UCI as category 2.1, and was held between 15 and 16 June 2013.

== Stages ==
=== Stage 1a (TTT) ===
15 June 2013 – Revò to Lauregno 11.5 km (7.1 mi)

Stage 1 result & General Classification

| | Team | Time |
|---|---|---|
| 1 | Be Pink | 26'19" |
| 2 | Team Specialized–lululemon | + 14" |
| 3 | MCipollini–Giordana | + 16" |
| 4 | Hitec Products UCK | + 1' 00" |
| 5 | Team Pratomagno Women | + 1' 06" |

General classification after stage 1

| | Rider | Team | Time |
|---|---|---|---|
| 1 | Dalia Muccioli (ITA) | Be Pink | 26' 19" |
| 2 | Georgia Williams (NZL) | Be Pink | s.t. |
| 3 | Doris Schweizer (ITA) | Be Pink | s.t. |
| 4 | Trixi Worrack (GER) | Team Specialized–lululemon | + 14" |
| 5 | Evelyn Stevens (USA) | Team Specialized–lululemon | + 14" |

=== Stage 1b ===
15 June 2013 – Termon to Termon 88.6 km (55.1 mi)

Stage 1b result

| | Rider | Team | Time |
|---|---|---|---|
| 1 | Evelyn Stevens (USA) | Team Specialized–lululemon | 2hr 19' 23" |
| 2 | Emma Johansson (SWE) | Orica–AIS | + 39" |
| 3 | Elisa Longo Borghini (ITA) | Hitec Products UCK | + 40" |
| 4 | Tatiana GuderzoZ (ITA) | MCipollini–Giordana | + 40" |
| 5 | Paulina Brezezna Bentkowska (POL) | | + 1' 09" |

General classification after stage 1b

| | Rider | Team | Time |
|---|---|---|---|
| 1 | Evelyn Stevens (USA) | Team Specialized–lululemon | 2h 45' 50" |
| 2 | Tatiana Guderzo (ITA) | MCipollini–Giordana | + 46" |
| 3 | Tatiana Anotoshina (RUS) | MCipollini–Giordana | + 1' 15" |
| 4 | Elisa Longo Borghini (ITA) | Hitec Products UCK | + 1' 30" |
| 5 | Georgia Williams (NZL) | Be Pink | + 1' 41" |

=== Stage 2 ===
16 June 2013 – San Romedio to Sarnonico 103.8 km (64.5 mi)

Stage 1b result

| | Rider | Team | Time |
|---|---|---|---|
| 1 | Shara Gillow (AUS) | Orica–AIS | + 1' 05" |
| 2 | Emma Johansson (SWE) | Orica–AIS | + 1' 05" |
| 3 | Rossella Ratto (ITA) | Hitec Products UCK | + 1' 05" |
| 4 | Tatiana Guderzo (ITA) | MCipollini–Giordana | + 1' 05" |
| 5 | Valentina Scandolara (ITA) | MCipollini–Giordana | + 1' 05" |

Final general classification after stage 2

| | Rider | Team | Time |
|---|---|---|---|
| 1 | Evelyn Stevens (USA) | Team Specialized–lululemon | 6h 04' 22" |
| 2 | Tatiana Guderzo (ITA) | MCipollini–Giordana | + 46" |
| 3 | Tatiana Antoshina (RUS) | MCipollini–Giordana | + 1' 15" |
| 4 | Elisa Longo Borghini (ITA) | Hitec Products UCK | + 1' 30" |
| 5 | Georgia Williams (NZL) | Be Pink | + 1' 41" |
