= Grand Prix El Salvador =

Race details
- Date: March
- Region: El Salvador
- Discipline: Road

History
- First edition: 2012
- Editions: 4 (as of 2024)
- First winner: Noemi Cantele (ITA)
- Most wins: Noemi Cantele (ITA); Silvia Valsecchi (ITA); Alena Amialiusik (BLR) (1 win)
- Most recent: Valentina Basilico (ITA)

The Grand Prix El Salvador is an elite women's professional one-day road bicycle race held in El Salvador.

== Past winners ==
Year	Country	Rider	Team
2012	Italy	Noemi Cantele	
2013	Italy	Silvia Valsecchi	
2014	Belarus	Alena Amialiusik	
2024	Italy	Valentina Basilico	Eneicat–CMTeam
