= Alena Amialiusik =

Belarusian cyclist (born 1989)

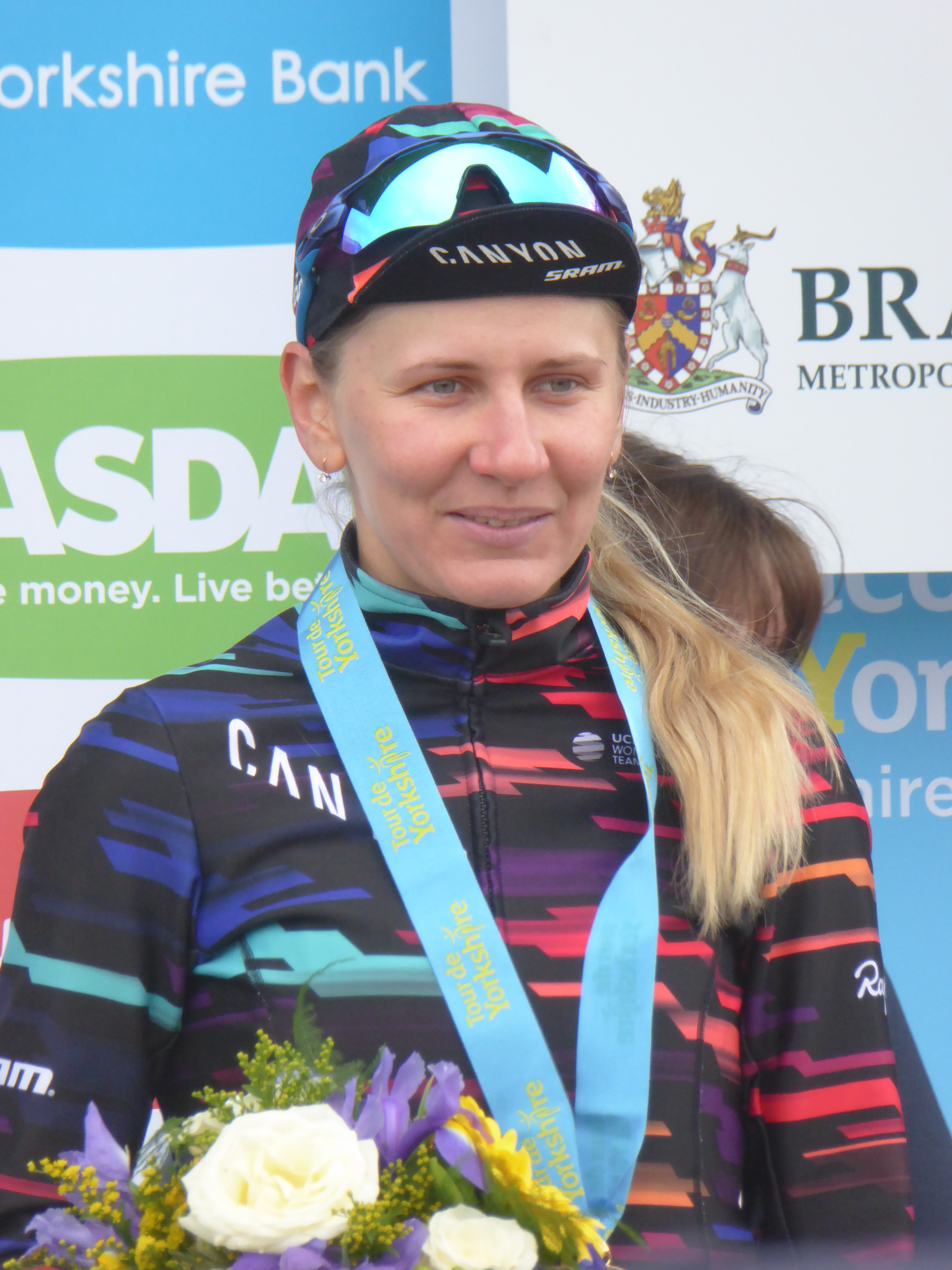
- Amialiusik at the 2018 Women's Tour de Yorkshire

Personal information
- Full name: Alena Vasileŭna Amialiusik
- Born: 6 February 1989 (age 37) Babruysk, Byelorussian SSR, Soviet Union
- Height: 1.69 m (5 ft 7 in)
- Weight: 53 kg (117 lb)

Cycling career
- Sport: Cycling
- Current team: UAE Team L'Imad
- Discipline: Road
- Role: Rider
- Rider type: All-rounder

Amateur team
- 2007: Ausra Gruodis

Professional teams
- 2008–2010: ISD–Sport Donetsk
- 2012–2014: Be Pink
- 2015: Velocio–SRAM
- 2016–2022: Canyon//SRAM
- 2023–: UAE Team ADQ

Major wins
- Stage races Gracia–Orlová (2015) One Day races National Time Trial Championships (2011–2015, 2018) National Road Race Championships (2011, 2013–2015, 2018) Grand Prix el Salvador (2014) Winston-Salem Cycling Classic (2015)
Medal record
Women's road cycling
Representing Belarus
European Games
Gold medal – first place	2015 Baku	Road Race
Representing her cycling team 2014 Astana BePink Women Team 2015 Velocio–SRAM
World Championships
Gold medal – first place	2015 Richmond	Team Time Trial
Bronze medal – third place	2014 Ponferrada	Team Time Trial

Alena Vasileŭna Amialiusik (Belarusian: Алена Васільеўна Амялюсік; born 6 February 1989) is a Belarusian road bicycle racer, who rides for UCI Women's WorldTeam UAE Team L'Imad.

She competed at the 2012 Summer Olympics in the Women's road race, finishing 15th. She was announced as a member of the Velocio–SRAM squad for the 2015 season. She also competed in the 2015 European Games for Belarus, in cycling, more specifically, the women's road race and earned a gold medal. At the World Championships in Richmond, she also won a gold medal on the team time trial with her team Velocio–SRAM. In November 2015 she was announced as part of the Canyon//SRAM team's inaugural squad for the 2016 season. At the 2016 Olympics, she competed in both the road race and the time trial.

Amialiusik spent seven seasons with the Canyon//SRAM team, before signing a two-year contract to ride for UAE Team ADQ from the 2023 season.

== Major results ==
2006
7th Road race, UCI Junior World Championships
2007
UEC European Junior Road Championships

3rd Time trial
9th Road race

National Road Championships

3rd Time trial
3rd Road race

2008
4th Team pursuit, UCI Track Cycling World Championships
UEC European Under-23 Track Championships

6th Scratch
9th Points race

2009
3rd Time trial, National Road Championships
7th Road race, UEC European Under-23 Road Championships
2010
2nd Road race, National Road Championships
2nd Team pursuit, National Track Championships
2011
National Road Championships

1st Time trial
1st Road race

UEC European Under-23 Road Championships

2nd Road race
7th Time trial

National Track Championships

3rd Points race
3rd Scratch

4th Overall Puchar Prezesa LZS
2012
National Road Championships

1st Time trial
3rd Road race

1st Stage 1 (ITT) La Route de France
2nd Overall Tour Féminin en Limousin
3rd Grand Prix GSB
4th Overall Emakumeen Euskal Bira
5th Overall Gracia–Orlová

1st Mountains classification
1st Sprints classification

5th GP Comune di Cornaredo
6th Durango-Durango Emakumeen Saria
8th Overall Vuelta a El Salvador
9th Grand Prix el Salvador
10th Tour of Flanders
2013
National Road Championships

1st Time trial
1st Road race

1st GP Oberbaselbiet
1st Stage 2 (ITT) Tour Cycliste Féminin International de l'Ardèche
2nd Overall Vuelta a El Salvador

1st Stage 2 (TTT)

2nd Grand Prix GSB
3rd Overall Tour Languedoc Roussillon

1st Mountains classification

4th GP de Plouay
5th Overall La Route de France
5th Overall Gracia–Orlová

1st Mountains classification
1st Sprints classification

6th Overall Emakumeen Euskal Bira
6th Grand Prix de Dottignies
7th La Flèche Wallonne Féminine
8th Grand Prix el Salvador
9th Grand Prix de Oriente
9th Durango-Durango Emakumeen Saria
10th Overall Giro d'Italia Femminile
2014
National Road Championships

1st Time trial
1st Road race

1st Grand Prix el Salvador
2nd Overall Vuelta a El Salvador

1st Points classification
1st Mountains classification
1st Stages 1 & 2

2nd Overall La Route de France
2nd Grand Prix GSB
3rd Team time trial, UCI Road World Championships
3rd Overall Vuelta Internacional Femenina a Costa Rica

1st Mountains classification
1st Stage 3

3rd Trofeo Alfredo Binda-Comune di Cittiglio
4th Philadelphia Cycling Classic
5th Overall Tour Cycliste Féminin International de l'Ardèche

1st Stage 5

5th Nagrada Ljubljane TT
6th Grand Prix de Oriente
6th Giro dell'Emilia Internazionale Donne Elite
9th GP de Plouay
2015
1st Team time trial
European Games

1st Road race
8th Time trial

National Road Championships

1st Time trial
1st Road race

1st Overall Gracia–Orlová

1st Points classification
1st Mountains classification
1st Active rider classification
1st Stage 1

1st Winston-Salem Cycling Classic
1st Mountains classification Holland Ladies Tour
1st Stage 2a (TTT) Energiewacht Tour
2nd Crescent Women World Cup Vårgårda TTT
3rd Philadelphia Cycling Classic
5th Overall Tour of California
5th Trofeo Alfredo Binda-Comune di Cittiglio
6th Tour of Flanders for Women
6th Chrono Gatineau
7th Strade Bianche Women
8th UCI Road World Championships – Women's time trial
8th UCI Road World Championships – Women's road race
9th La Flèche Wallonne Féminine
2016
2nd UCI Road World Championships – Women's team time trial
2nd Time trial, National Road Championships
3rd Overall Gracia–Orlová

1st Points classification
1st Stage 1

3rd Overall Holland Ladies Tour
3rd Philadelphia Cycling Classic
3rd Giro dell'Emilia Internazionale Donne Elite
UEC European Road Championships

4th Road race
4th Time trial

5th Trofeo Alfredo Binda-Comune di Cittiglio
6th La Flèche Wallonne Féminine
9th Overall Giro d'Italia Femminile
10th UCI Road World Championships – Women's time trial
10th GP de Plouay – Bretagne
2017
2nd Grand Prix de Plumelec-Morbihan Dames
2nd La Classique Morbihan
8th Overall Tour of California
2018
1st Team time trial, UCI Road World Championships
National Road Championships

1st Road race
1st Time trial

3rd Overall Women's Tour de Yorkshire
5th Trofeo Alfredo Binda-Comune di Cittiglio
2019
1st Stage 1 (TTT) Giro Rosa
National Road Championships

2nd Time trial
3rd Road race

2nd Postnord UCI WWT Vårgårda West Sweden TTT
5th Time trial, European Games
8th Liège–Bastogne–Liège
9th UCI Road World Championships – Women's time trial
10th Giro dell'Emilia Internazionale Donne Elite
2020
6th Tour of Flanders for Women
8th Time trial, UEC European Road Championships
2021
5th Overall Belgium Tour

1st Stage 2

8th Road race, UEC European Road Championships
10th UCI Road World Championships – Women's time trial
2022
Combativity award Stage 3 Tour de France
