= Grand Prix de Oriente =

Race details
- Date: March
- Region: El Salvador
- Discipline: Road

History
- First edition: 2013
- Editions: 2 (as of 2014)
- First winner: Noemi Cantele (ITA)
- Most wins: Noemi Cantele (ITA); Mara Abbott (USA) (1 win)
- Most recent: Mara Abbott (USA)

The Grand Prix de Oriente (Grand Prix San Miguel) is an elite women's professional one-day road bicycle race held in El Salvador.

== Past winners ==
Year	Country	Rider	Team
2013	Italy	Noemi Cantele	
2014	United States	Mara Abbott	
