= Maria Vittoria Sperotto =

Italian cyclist

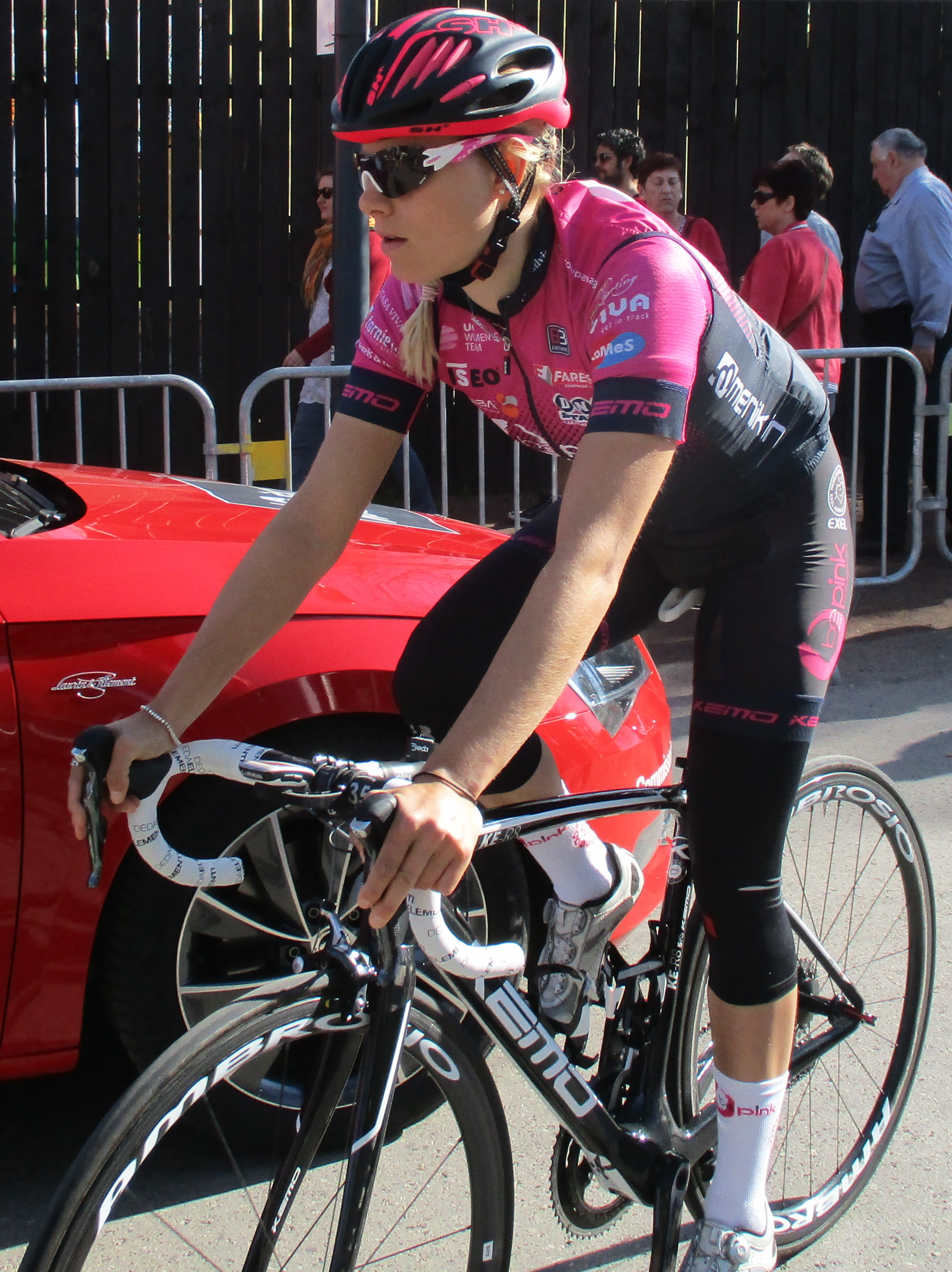
- Sperotto at the 2018 Flèche Wallonne

Personal information
- Full name: Maria Vittoria Sperotto
- Born: 20 November 1996 (age 29) Schio, Italy

Cycling career
- Sport: Cycling
- Current team: A.R. Monex
- Disciplines: Road; Track
- Role: Rider

Professional teams
- 2016: Servetto Footon
- 2017–2018: Bepink–Cogeas
- 2019–2020: Bigla Pro Cycling
- 2021: A.R. Monex

Maria Vittoria Sperotto (born 20 November 1996) is an Italian former professional racing cyclist, who last rode for UCI Women's Continental Team A.R. Monex. In November 2021, she set a record for the shortest distance ridden in an hour by a female cyclist. Sperotto retired from competition at the end of the 2021 season.

== Major results ==
2015
2nd Scratch Race, 6 giorni delle rose - Fiorenzuola (Under-23)
2017
3rd Scratch Race, GP Zürich - Oerlikon
1st Red Hook Crit Milan

== See also ==
- List of 2016 UCI Women's Teams and riders
