= Hannes Wilksch =

German cyclist

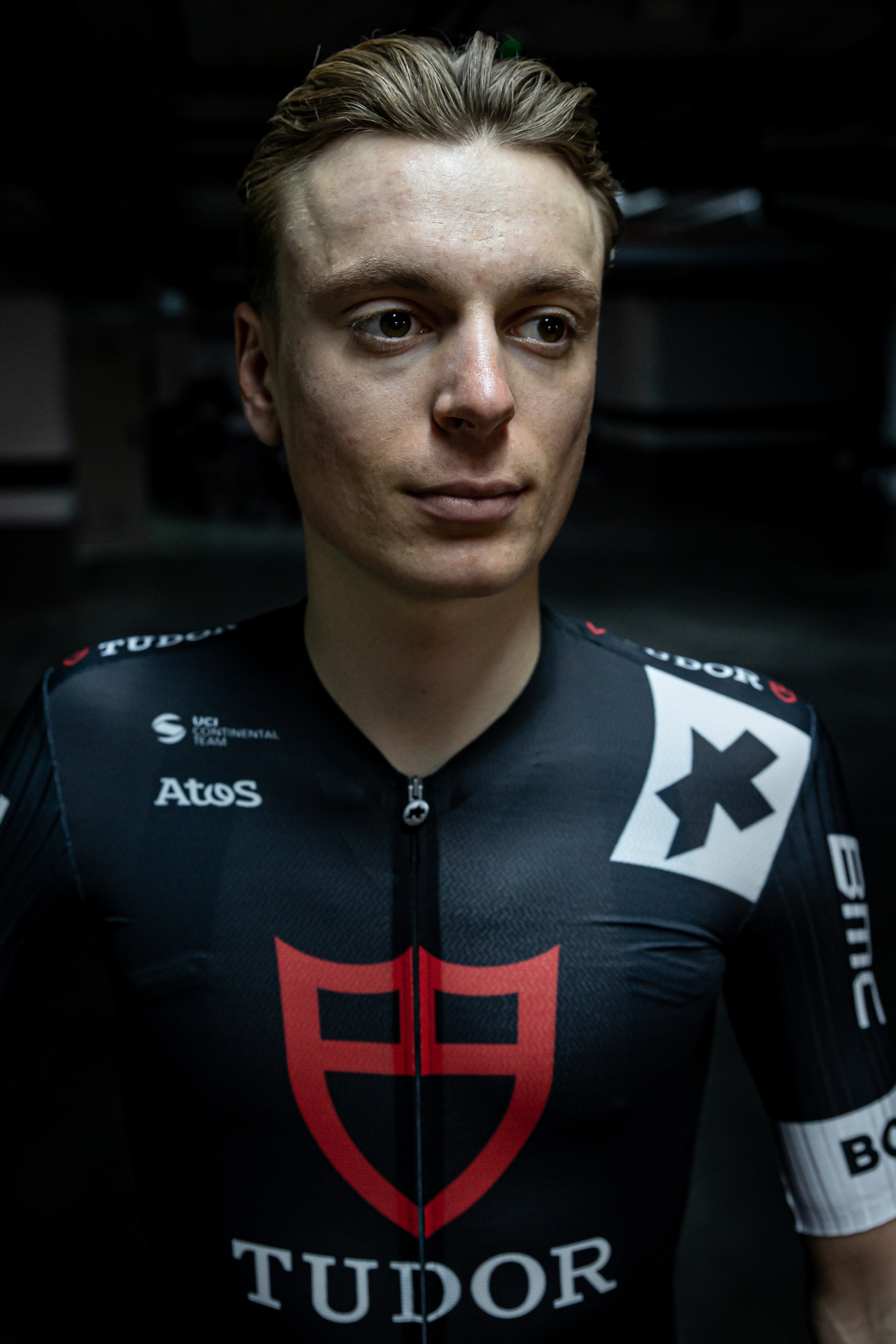
- Wilksch in 2023

Personal information
- Born: 30 October 2001 (age 24) Strausberg, Brandenburg, Germany
- Height: 1.81 m (5 ft 11 in)
- Weight: 62 kg (137 lb)

Cycling career
- Sport: Cycling
- Current team: Tudor Pro Cycling Team
- Disciplines: Road; Track (former)
- Role: Rider

Professional teams
- 2020–2022: Development Team Sunweb
- 2023: Tudor Pro Cycling Team U23 (Note: Until 4 August)
- 2023–: Tudor Pro Cycling Team (Note: Joined on 5 August)
Medal record
Men's track cycling
Representing Germany
World Junior Championships
Gold medal – first place	2019 Frankfurt	Team pursuit
Silver medal – second place	2019 Frankfurt	Madison
European Under-23 & Junior Championships
Bronze medal – third place	2019 Ghent	Junior points race
Bronze medal – third place	2019 Ghent	Junior team pursuit

Hannes Wilksch (born 30 October 2001) is a German cyclist, who currently rides for UCI ProTeam Tudor Pro Cycling Team.

== Major results ==
=== Road ===
2018
9th Overall Internationale Cottbuser Junioren-Etappenfahrt
2019
1st Overall Saarland Trofeo

1st Stage 3b (TTT)

2nd Overall Internationale Cottbuser Junioren-Etappenfahrt
3rd Overall Driedaagse van Axel
2020
4th Time trial, National Under-23 Championships
10th Overall Orlen Nations Grand Prix
2022
1st Mountains classification, Tour de l'Ain
National Under-23 Road Championships

2nd Road race
3rd Time trial

7th Overall Tour de l'Avenir

1st Stage 5 (TTT)

7th Overall Giro d'Italia Giovani Under 23
2023
3rd Overall Orlen Nations Grand Prix
3rd Overall Giro Next Gen
3rd Grand Prix de Plouay (1.2)
4th Time trial, National Under-23 Championships

=== Track ===
2019
UCI Junior World Championships

1st Team pursuit
2nd Madison (with Tim Torn Teutenberg)

UEC European Junior Championships

3rd Points race
3rd Team pursuit
