= 2013 Grand Prix de Oriente =

Race details
- Dates: 27 February 2013
- Distance: 99 km (61.52 mi)

Results
	Winner	Noemi Cantele (ITA)	(Bepink)
	Second	Lorena María Vargas (COL)	(Iscorp Inteligentsia Coffee Cycling Team)
	Third	Clemilda Fernandes Silva (BRA)	(Brazilian National Team)

The 2013 Grand Prix de Oriente was a one-day women's cycle race held in El Salvador on February 27, 2013. The tour has an UCI rating of 1.2. The race was won by the Italian Noemi Cantele of Be Pink.

Result

	Rider	Team	Time
1	Noemi Cantele (ITA)	Bepink	3h 10' 45"
2	Lorena María Vargas (COL)	Iscorp Intelligentsia Coffee Cycling Team	+ 2"
3	Clemilda Fernandes Silva (BRA)	Brazilian National Team	+ 4"
4	Evelyn García (SLV)	Pasta Zara–Cogeas	+ 29"
5	Sérika Mitchell Gulumá (COL)	Colombia–Specialized	+ 55"
6	Amber Neben (USA)	Pasta Zara–Cogeas	+ 1' 04"
7	Addyson Albershardt (USA)	Garrabo–Texops	+ 1' 28"
8	Inga Čilvinaitė (LTU)	Pasta Zara–Cogeas	+ 4' 01"
9	Alena Amialiusik (BLR)	Bepink	+ 4' 25"
10	Ana Sanabria (COL)	Colombia–Specialized	+ 4' 26"
