= 2014 Vuelta a El Salvador =

Race details
- Dates: 11–16 March
- Stages: 5 + Prologue
- Distance: 402 km (250 mi)
- Winning time: 11h 35' 25"

Results
Jersey awarded to the overall winner	Winner	Mara Abbott (United States)	(UnitedHealthcare)
	Second	Alena Amialiusik (Belarus)	(Astana BePink)
	Third	Olga Zabelinskaya (Russia)	(RusVelo)
Jersey awarded to the points classification winner	Points	Alena Amialiusik (Belarus)	(Astana BePink)
Jersey awarded to the mountains classification winner	Mountains	Alena Amialiusik (Belarus)	(Astana BePink)
Jersey awarded to the youth classification winner	Youth	Dalia Muccioli (Italy)	(Astana BePink)
Jersey awarded to the sprints classification winner	Sprints	Anna Stricker (Italy)	(Astana BePink)
	Team	Astana BePink	

The 2014 Vuelta a El Salvador is the ninth edition of a stage race held in El Salvador, with a UCI rating of 2.1. It is the fourth stage race of the 2014 Women's Elite cycling calendar.

== Teams ==
Elite UCI Women's teams

Astana BePink
RusVelo
UnitedHealthcare
Servetto-Zhiraf
Hitec Products UCK

Women's teams

Vanderkitten
DNA Cycling p/b K4 Racing
Fundación San Mateo — IDRD — Bogotá Humana
Pedalea CON Nosostras

National teams

Mexico
Colombia
Brazil
Guatemala

== Stages ==
=== Prologue ===
11 March 2014 – Nuevo Cuscatlán, 4 km (2.5 mi), individual time trial (ITT)

Prologue Result & General Classification after Prologue

	Rider	Team	Time
1	Olga Zabelinskaya (RUS)	RusVelo	6' 03"
2	Alena Amialiusik (BLR)	Astana BePink	+ 13"
3	Sharon Laws (GBR)	UnitedHealthcare	+ 19"
4	Laura Lozano (COL)	Fundación San Mateo IDRD Bogotá Humana	+ 27"
5	Tatiana Antoshina (RUS)	RusVelo	+ 28"
6	Alexandra Burchenkova (RUS)	RusVelo	+ 28"
7	Elena Kuchinskaya (RUS)	RusVelo	+ 28"
8	Rhae Shaw (CAN)	Vanderkitten	+ 29"
9	Inga Čilvinaitė (LTU)	RusVelo	+ 29"
10	Tetyana Riabchenko (UKR)	DNA Cycling p/b K4 Racing	+ 29"

=== Stage 1 ===
12 March 2014 – La Libertad to Nahuizalco, 95 km (59.0 mi)

Stage 1 Result

	Rider	Team	Time
1	Alena Amialiusik (BLR)	Astana BePink	2h 56' 34"
2	Sharon Laws (GBR)	UnitedHealthcare	s.t.
3	Flávia Oliveira (BRA)	Brazil (National team)	s.t.
4	Olga Zabelinskaya (RUS)	RusVelo	s.t.
5	Elena Kuchinskaya (RUS)	RusVelo	s.t.
6	Tetyana Riabchenko (UKR)	DNA Cycling p/b K4 Racing	+ 4"
7	Anna Potokina (RUS)	Servetto-Zhiraf	+ 4"
8	Uênia Fernandes de Souza (BRA)	Brazil (National team)	+ 4"
9	Dalia Muccioli (ITA)	Astana BePink	+ 4"
10	Laura Lozano (COL)	Fundación San Mateo IDRD Bogotá Humana	+ 4"

General Classification after Stage 1

	Rider	Team	Time
1	Olga Zabelinskaya (RUS)	RusVelo	3h 02' 37"
2	Alena Amialiusik (BLR)	Astana BePink	+ 13"
3	Sharon Laws (GBR)	UnitedHealthcare	+ 19"
4	Elena Kuchinskaya (RUS)	RusVelo	+ 28"
5	Laura Lozano (COL)	Fundación San Mateo IDRD Bogotá Humana	+ 31"
6	Alexandra Burchenkova (RUS)	RusVelo	+ 32"
7	Tetyana Riabchenko (UKR)	DNA Cycling p/b K4 Racing	+ 33"
8	Mara Abbott (USA)	UnitedHealthcare	+ 33"
9	Doris Schweizer (SUI)	Astana BePink	+ 33"
10	Kate Hall (USA)	UnitedHealthcare	+ 38"

=== Stage 2 ===
13 March 2014 – San Marcos - Zacatecoluca - San Marcos, 108.5 km (67.4 mi)

Stage 2 Result

	Rider	Team	Time
1	Alena Amialiusik (BLR)	Astana BePink	3h 09' 28"
2	Olga Zabelinskaya (RUS)	RusVelo	s.t.
3	Elena Kuchinskaya (RUS)	RusVelo	s.t.
4	Sharon Laws (GBR)	UnitedHealthcare	s.t.
5	Flávia Oliveira (BRA)	Brazil (National team)	s.t.
6	Mara Abbott (USA)	UnitedHealthcare	+ 4"
7	Alexandra Burchenkova (RUS)	RusVelo	+ 6"
8	Tetyana Riabchenko (UKR)	DNA Cycling p/b K4 Racing	+ 7"
9	Laura Lozano (COL)	Fundación San Mateo IDRD Bogotá Humana	+ 9"
10	Katie Hall (USA)	UnitedHealthcare	+ 9"

General Classification after Stage 2

	Rider	Team	Time
1	Olga Zabelinskaya (RUS)	RusVelo	6h 12' 05"
2	Alena Amialiusik (BLR)	Astana BePink	+ 13"
3	Sharon Laws (GBR)	UnitedHealthcare	+ 19"
4	Elena Kuchinskaya (RUS)	RusVelo	+ 28"
5	Mara Abbott (USA)	UnitedHealthcare	+ 37"
6	Alexandra Burchenkova (RUS)	RusVelo	+ 38"
7	Tetyana Riabchenko (UKR)	DNA Cycling p/b K4 Racing	+ 40"
8	Flávia Oliveira (BRA)	Brazil (National team)	+ 40"
9	Laura Lozano (COL)	Fundación San Mateo IDRD Bogotá Humana	+ 40"
10	Doris Schweizer (SUI)	Astana BePink	+ 42"

=== Stage 3 ===
14 March 2014 – Nueva Concepción - Santa Ana, 90 km (55.9 mi)

Stage 3 Result

	Rider	Team	Time
1	Flávia Oliveira (BRA)	Brazil (National team)	2h 05' 39"
2	Alena Amialiusik (BLR)	Astana BePink	s.t.
3	Olga Zabelinskaya (RUS)	RusVelo	s.t.
4	Sharon Laws (GBR)	UnitedHealthcare	+ 5"
5	Elena Kuchinskaya (BRA)	RusVelo	+ 9"
6	Laura Lozano (COL)	Fundación San Mateo IDRD Bogotá Humana	+ 11"
7	Alexandra Burchenkova (RUS)	RusVelo	+ 11"
8	Mara Abbott (USA)	UnitedHealthcare	+ 11"
9	Uênia Fernandes de Souza (BRA)	Brazil (National team)	+ 12"
10	Ana Polegatch (BRA)	Brazil (National team)	+ 12"

General Classification after Stage 3

	Rider	Team	Time
1	Olga Zabelinskaya (RUS)	RusVelo	8h 17' 44"
2	Alena Amialiusik (BLR)	Astana BePink	+ 13"
3	Sharon Laws (GBR)	UnitedHealthcare	+ 24"
4	Elena Kuchinskaya (RUS)	RusVelo	+ 37"
5	Flávia Oliveira (BRA)	Brazil (national team)	+ 40"
6	Laura Lozano (COL)	Fundación San Mateo IDRD Bogotá Humana	+ 42"
7	Alexandra Burchenkova (RUS)	RusVelo	+ 43"
8	Mara Abbott (USA)	UnitedHealthcare	+ 44"
9	Tetyana Riabchenko (UKR)	DNA Cycling p/b K4 Racing	+ 48"
10	Doris Schweizer (SUI)	Astana BePink	+ 48"

=== Stage 4 ===
15 March 2014 – Santa Tecla - El Boquerón, 43.8 km (27.2 mi)

Stage 4 Result

	Rider	Team	Time
1	Mara Abbott (USA)	UnitedHealthcare	1h 26' 47"
2	Alena Amialiusik (BLR)	Astana BePink	+ 2' 49"
3	Uênia Fernandes de Souza (BRA)	Brazil (National team)	+ 3' 18"
4	Flávia Oliveira (BRA)	Brazil (national team)	+ 3' 38"
5	Olga Zabelinskaya (RUS)	RusVelo	+ 3' 38"
6	Doris Schweizer (SUI)	Astana BePink	+ 3' 38"
7	Tetyana Riabchenko (UKR)	DNA Cycling p/b K4 Racing	+ 5' 48"
8	Sharon Laws (GBR)	UnitedHealthcare	+ 6' 03"
9	Marina Likanova (RUS)	Servetto-Zhiraf	+ 6' 17"
10	Laura Lozano (COL)	Fundación San Mateo IDRD Bogotá Humana	+ 6' 25"

General Classification after Stage 4

	Rider	Team	Time
1	Mara Abbott (USA)	UnitedHealthcare	9h 45' 15"
2	Alena Amialiusik (BLR)	Astana BePink	+ 2' 18"
3	Olga Zabelinskaya (RUS)	RusVelo	+ 2' 54"
4	Flávia Oliveira (BRA)	Brazil (national team)	+ 3' 34"
5	Doris Schweizer (SUI)	Astana BePink	+ 3' 42"
6	Uênia Fernandes de Souza (BRA)	Brazil (National team)	+ 3' 44"
7	Sharon Laws (GBR)	UnitedHealthcare	+ 5' 43"
8	Tetyana Riabchenko (UKR)	DNA Cycling p/b K4 Racing	+ 5' 52"
9	Laura Lozano (COL)	Fundación San Mateo IDRD Bogotá Humana	+ 6' 23"
10	Dalia Muccioli (ITA)	Astana BePink	+ 7' 52"

=== Stage 5 ===
16 March 2014 – Santa Tecla to San Luis Talpa, 83.1 km (51.6 mi)

Stage 5 Result

	Rider	Team	Time
1	Inga Čilvinaitė (LTU)	RusVelo	1h 50' 07"
2	Anna Potokina (RUS)	Servetto-Zhiraf	+ 3"
3	Hannah Barnes (GBR)	UnitedHealthcare	+ 3"
4	Anna Stricker (ITA)	Astana BePink	+ 3"
5	Annalisa Cucinotta (ITA)	Servetto-Zhiraf	+ 3"
6	Cecilie Gotaas Johnsen (NOR)	Hitec Products UCK	+ 3"
7	Flávia Oliveira (BRA)	Brazil National team	+ 3"
8	Alena Amialiusik (BLR)	Astana BePink	+ 3"
9	Laura Lozano (COL)	Fundación San Mateo IDRD Bogotá Humana	+ 3"
10	Olga Zabelinskaya (RUS)	RusVelo	+ 3"

Final General Classification

	Rider	Team	Time
1	Mara Abbott (USA)	UnitedHealthcare	11h 35' 25"
2	Alena Amialiusik (BLR)	Astana BePink	+ 2' 18"
3	Olga Zabelinskaya (RUS)	RusVelo	+ 2' 54"
4	Flávia Oliveira (BRA)	Brazil (national team)	+ 3' 34"
5	Doris Schweizer (SUI)	Astana BePink	+ 3' 42"
6	Uênia Fernandes de Souza (BRA)	Brazil (National team)	+ 3' 44"
7	Sharon Laws (GBR)	UnitedHealthcare	+ 5' 43"
8	Tetyana Riabchenko (UKR)	DNA Cycling p/b K4 Racing	+ 5' 52"
9	Laura Lozano (COL)	Fundación San Mateo IDRD Bogotá Humana	+ 6' 23"
10	Dalia Muccioli (ITA)	Astana BePink	+ 7' 52"

== Classification leadership table ==
General classification: the rider with the lowest overall accumulated time
Points classification: the rider who has scored the highest number of points
Sprints classification: the rider who has scored the highest number of points from intermediate sprints
Mountains classification: the rider who has scored the highest number of points from specified climbs
Combativity classification: the rider who has been the most aggressive
Young rider classification: the rider with the lowest overall accumulated time under a specified age
Best Salvadorean rider: the rider with the lowest overall accumulated time from El Salvador

Stage	Winner	General classification	Points classification	Young rider classification	Sprints classification	Mountains classification	Best Salvadorean rider	Teams classification
P	Olga Zabelinskaya	Olga Zabelinskaya	Olga Zabelinskaya	Ruth Winder	Not awarded	Not awarded	Xenia Estrada	RusVelo
1	Alena Amialiusik	Olga Zabelinskaya	Alena Amialiusik	Dalia Muccioli	Anna Stricker	Alena Amialiusik	Ana Figueroa	RusVelo
2	Alena Amialiusik	Olga Zabelinskaya	Alena Amialiusik	Dalia Muccioli	Alena Amialiusik	Alena Amialiusik	Ana Figueroa	RusVelo
3	Flávia Oliveira	Olga Zabelinskaya	Alena Amialiusik	Dalia Muccioli	Alena Amialiusik	Alena Amialiusik	Ana Figueroa	RusVelo
4	Mara Abbott	Mara Abbott	Alena Amialiusik	Dalia Muccioli	Anna Stricker	Alena Amialiusik	Ana Figueroa	Astana BePink
5	Inga Čilvinaitė	Mara Abbott	Alena Amialiusik	Dalia Muccioli	Anna Stricker	Alena Amialiusik	Ana Figueroa	Astana BePink
Final		Mara Abbott	Alena Amialiusik	Dalia Muccioli	Anna Stricker	Alena Amialiusik	Ana Figueroa	Astana BePink
