= 2020 UEC European Track Championships – Women's individual pursuit =

Women's individual pursuit at the 2020 UEC European Track Championships
- Venue: Kolodruma, Plovdiv
- Date: 13 November
- Competitors: 11 from 8 nations
- Winning time: 3:29.456

Medalists
gold medal	Neah Evans	Great Britain
silver medal	Martina Alzini	Italy
bronze medal	Silvia Valsecchi	Italy

The women's individual pursuit competition at the 2020 UEC European Track Championships was held on 13 November 2020.

== Results ==
=== Qualifying ===
The first two racers raced for gold, the third and fourth fastest rider raced for the bronze medal.

Rank	Name	Nation	Time	Behind	Notes
1	Neah Evans	Great Britain	3:26.826		QG
2	Martina Alzini	Italy	3:26.836	+0.010	QG
3	Josie Knight	Great Britain	3:28.387	+1.561	QB
4	Silvia Valsecchi	Italy	3:28.751	+1.925	QB
5	Tamara Dronova	Russia	3:33.089	+6.263	
6	Hanna Tserakh	Belarus	3:35.181	+8.355	
7	Léna Mettraux	Switzerland	3:37.853	+11.027	
8	Sandra Alonso	Spain	3:41.224	+14.398	
9	Michelle Andres	Switzerland	3:41.648	+14.822	
10	Patrycja Lorkowska	Poland	3:45.188	+18.362	
11	Tereza Medveďová	Slovakia	3:46.045	+19.219	

=== Finals ===
Rank	Name	Nation	Time	Behind	Notes
Gold medal final
1st place, gold medalist(s)	Neah Evans	Great Britain	3:29.456		
2nd place, silver medalist(s)	Martina Alzini	Italy	3:32.386	+2.930	
Bronze medal final
3rd place, bronze medalist(s)	Silvia Valsecchi	Italy	3:28.878		
4	Josie Knight	Great Britain	3:31.519	+2.642	
