= Doris Schweizer =

Swiss cyclist

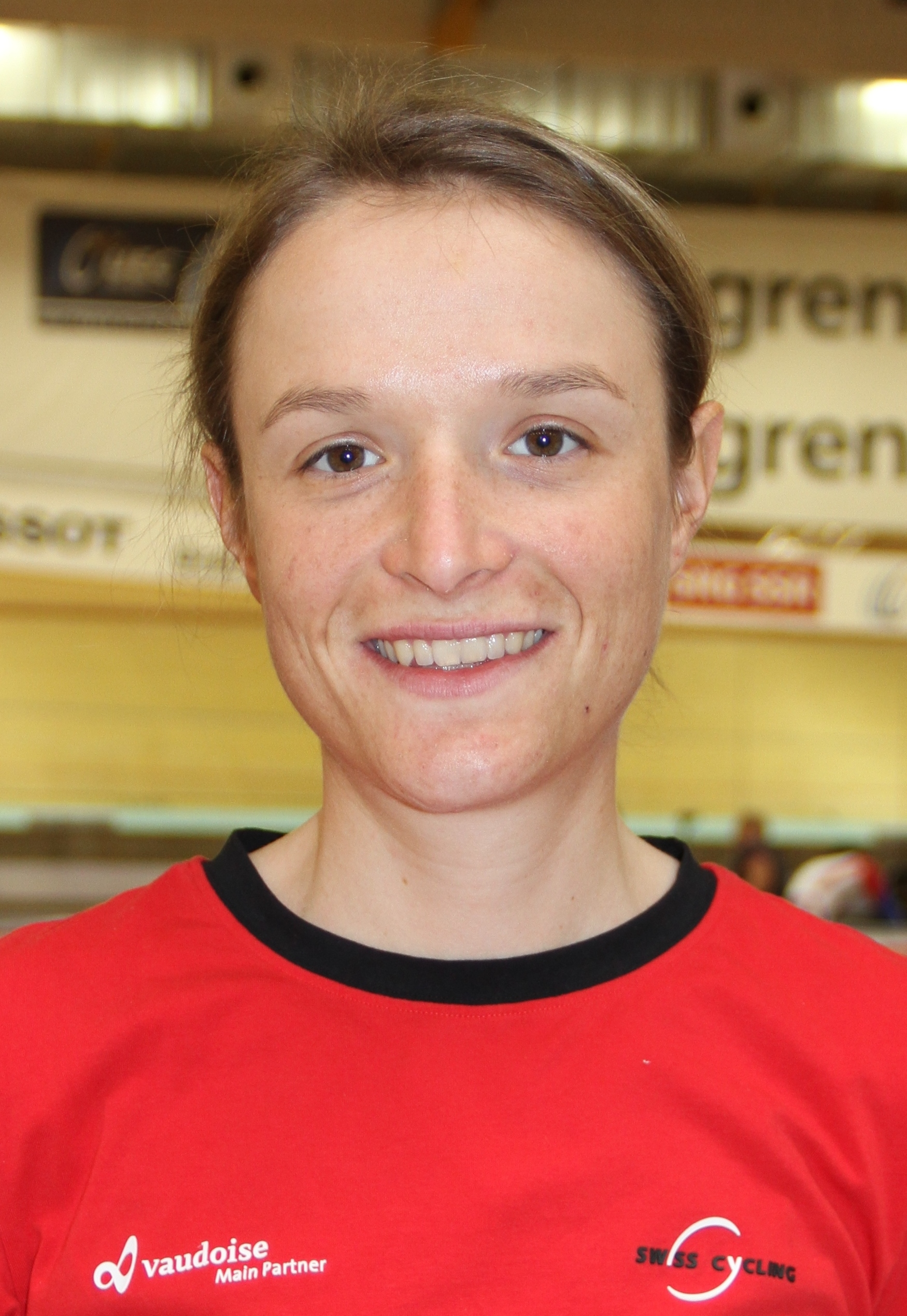
- Schweizer in 2015

Personal information
- Full name: Doris Schweizer
- Born: 28 August 1989 (age 37) Lucerne, Switzerland

Cycling career
- Sport: Cycling
- Disciplines: Road; Track
- Role: Rider

Amateur teams
- 2010: Bigla Team
- 2010: Bike-import.ch (guest)
- 2011: EKZ Racing Team
- 2019: High Ambition 2020 Japan (guest)

Professional teams
- 2012: Fassa Bortolo–Servetto
- 2013–2014: Be Pink
- 2015: Bigla Pro Cycling Team
- 2016: Cylance Pro Cycling
- 2017–2018: Team VéloCONCEPT
- 2019: Bizkaia–Durango
- 2020–2021: Team Illuminate
- 2022: InstaFund Racing

Doris Schweizer (born 28 August 1989) is a Swiss racing cyclist, who most recently rode for UCI Women's Continental Team InstaFund Racing. She was the winner of the Swiss National Road Race Championships in 2013 and 2016 and the Swiss National Time Trial Championships in 2015 and 2016.

In November 2015 she was announced as part of the inaugural squad for the Cylance Pro Cycling team for the 2016 season.

== Major results ==
2007
10th Time trial, UEC European Junior Road Championships
2010
3rd Road race, National Road Championships
8th Time trial, UEC European Under-23 Road Championships
2011
4th Time trial, UEC European Under-23 Road Championships
10th Road race, Summer Universiade
2012
8th Memorial Davide Fardelli
2013
National Road Championships

1st Road race
2nd Time trial

10th Overall Vuelta a El Salvador

1st Stage 2 (TTT)

2014
3 Jours d'Aigle

1st Points race
2nd Individual pursuit

National Road Championships

2nd Time trial
3rd Road race

3rd Team time trial, UCI Road World Championships
3rd Overall Tour de Bretagne Féminin

1st Stage 1

5th Overall Vuelta a El Salvador
5th Grand Prix de Oriente
5th Grand Prix el Salvador
7th Overall Tour Cycliste Féminin International de l'Ardèche
7th GP du Canton d'Argovie
9th Overall Vuelta Internacional Femenina a Costa Rica
9th Grand Prix GSB
2015
National Road Championships

1st Time trial
3rd Road race

8th Overall Gracia–Orlová
10th 94.7 Cycle Challenge
2016
National Road Championships

1st Road race
1st Time trial

1st Stage 7 Tour Cycliste Féminin International de l'Ardèche
10th Overall Emakumeen Euskal Bira

1st Mountains classification

== See also ==
- 2014 Astana BePink Women's Team season
