= Alice Algisi =

Italian cyclist (born 1993)

Personal information
- Born: 10 March 1993 (age 33)

Cycling career
- Sport: Cycling
- Role: Retired

Professional teams
- 2012–2014: BePink
- 2015: Alé Cipollini

Alice Algisi (born 10 March 1993) is an Italian former professional racing cyclist.

== See also ==
- 2014 Astana BePink Women's Team season
