= Anna Zita Maria Stricker =

Italian cyclist (born 1994)

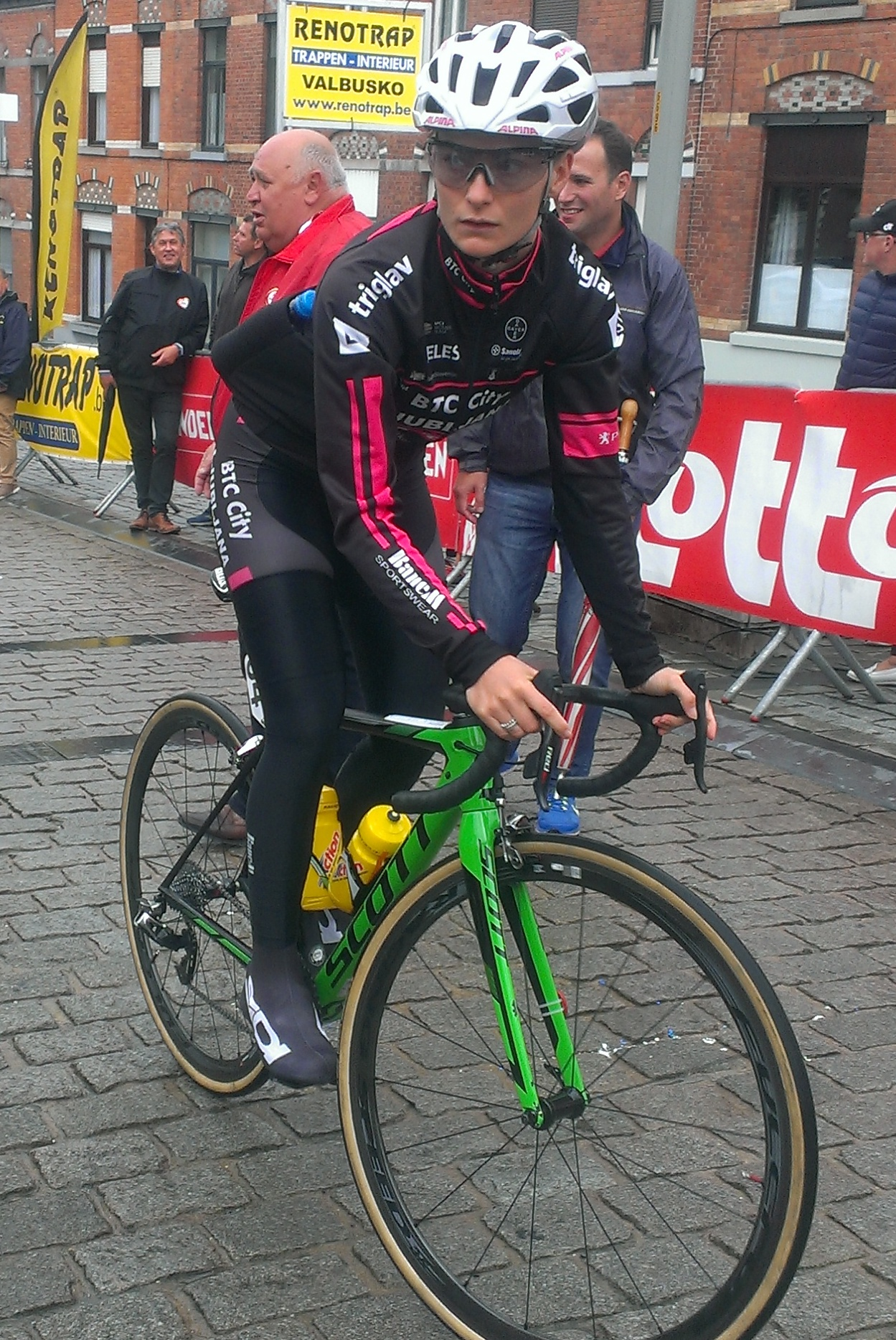
- Stricker in 2017.

Personal information
- Full name: Anna Zita Maria Stricker
- Born: 3 July 1994 (age 32) Zams, Austria

Cycling career
- Sport: Cycling
- Discipline: Road
- Role: Rider

Professional teams
- 2013: MCipollini–Giordana
- 2014: Astana BePink Women Team
- 2015–2016: Inpa–Bianchi
- 2017: BTC City Ljubljana
- 2018: Bizkaia Durango–Euskadi Murias

Anna Zita Maria Stricker (born 3 July 1994) is an Austrian-born Italian professional racing cyclist, who last rode for UCI Women's Team Bizkaia Durango–Euskadi Murias.

== Major results ==
2012
2nd Road race, UEC European Junior Road Championships
3rd Road race, UCI Junior Road World Championships
2014
1st Sprints classification, Vuelta a El Salvador
4th GP Comune di Cornaredo
2015
2nd Giro del Trentino Alto Adige-Südtirol
2016
3rd Road race, National Road Championships
3rd Overall Giro della Toscana Int. Femminile – Memorial Michela Fanini

1st Young rider classification
1st Stage 1

8th Overall Tour de Bretagne Féminin

1st Mountains classification

2017
1st Mountains classification, Grand Prix Elsy Jacobs
6th Overall Tour of Chongming Island

== See also ==
- 2014 Astana BePink Women's Team season
