= 2014 Tour Cycliste Féminin International de l'Ardèche =

Race details
- Dates: 2–7 September 2014
- Stages: 7 stages
- Distance: 644.7 km (400.6 mi)

The 2014 Tour Cycliste Féminin International de l'Ardèche was a women's cycle stage race held in France from 2 September to 7 September, 2014. The tour has an UCI rating of 2.2.

== Teams ==
The following teams participated:

UCI Women's Teams

- Astana BePink
- Estado de México–Faren Kuota
- Lointek
- Poitou–Charentes.Futuroscope.86
- RusVelo
- Servetto Footon
- Optum Kelly Benefit Strategies
- Top Girls Fassa Bortolo
- Wiggle–Honda

National teams

- Australia
- Denmark
- France
- Lithuania
- Norway
- Russia
- Switzerland

Club teams

- Boretti Ladies (Netherlands)
- Maxx–Solar (Germany)
- Racing Students + Stevens Hytera (Germany)
- TKK Pacific Toruń (Poland)

Mixed teams

- Mixed team 1
- Mixed team 2

== Stages ==
=== Stage 1 ===
2 September La Voulte to Beauchastel 104.4 km (64.9 mi)

Stage 1 result & General classification

	Rider	Team	Time
1	Giorgia Bronzini (ITA)	Wiggle High5	2h 38' 30"
2	Tiffany Cromwell (AUS)	Australia (National team)	s.t.
3	Tayler Wiles (USA)	Mixed team 1	s.t.
4	Lizzie Williams (AUS)	Australia (National team)	s.t.
5	Elena Kuchinskaya (RUS)	RusVelo	s.t.
6	Elena Cecchini (ITA)	Estado de México–Faren Kuota	s.t.
7	Oxana Kozonchuk (RUS)	RusVelo	s.t.
8	Elena Valentini (ITA)	Servetto Footon	s.t.
9	Christina Siggaard (DEN)	Denmark (National team)	s.t.
10	Daiva Tušlaitė (LTU)	Lithuania (National team)	s.t.

=== Stage 2 (ITT) ===
3 September Valvignères to Alba-la-Romaine 6.7 km (4.2 mi)

Stage 2 result

	Rider	Team	Time
1	Linda Villumsen (NZL)	Wiggle High5	10' 02"
2	Alena Amialiusik (BLR)	Astana BePink	+ 10"
3	Tayler Wiles (USA)	Mixed team 1	+ 12"
4	Rachel Neylan (AUS)	Australia (National team)	+ 19"
5	Lizzie Williams (AUS)	Australia (National team)	+ 23"
6	Charlotte Becker (GER)	Wiggle High5	+ 30"
7	Julie Leth (DEN)	Denmark (National team)	+ 31"
8	Lucy Coldwell (GBR)	Maxx-Solar	+ 33"
9	Silvia Valsecchi (ITA)	Astana BePink	+ 33"
10	Janel Holcomb (USA)	Team Optum p/b Kelly Benefit Strategies	+ 35"

General classification after stage 2

	Rider	Team	Time
1	Linda Villumsen (NZL)	Wiggle High5	2h 48' 32"
2	Alena Amialiusik (BLR)	Astana BePink	+ 10"
3	Tayler Wiles (USA)	Mixed team 1	+ 12"
4	Rachel Neylan (AUS)	Australia (National team)	+ 19"
5	Lizzie Williams (AUS)	Australia (National team)	+ 23"
6	Charlotte Becker (GER)	Wiggle High5	+ 30"
7	Julie Leth (DEN)	Denmark (National team)	+ 31"
8	Lucy Coldwell (GBR)	Maxx-Solar	+ 33"
9	Silvia Valsecchi (ITA)	Astana BePink	+ 33"
10	Janel Holcomb (USA)	Team Optum p/b Kelly Benefit Strategies	+ 35"

=== Stage 3 ===
3 September Alba-la-Romaine to Le Teil 77.3 km (48.0 mi)

Stage 3 result

	Rider	Team	Time
1	Loren Rowney (AUS)	Australia (National team)	2h 09' 14"
2	Giorgia Bronzini (ITA)	Wiggle High5	s.t.
3	Tiffany Cromwell (USA)	Australia (National team)	s.t.
4	Élise Delzenne (FRA)	France (National team)	s.t.
5	Elena Cecchini (ITA)	Estado de México–Faren Kuota	s.t.
6	Chiara Pierobon (ITA)	Top Girls Fassa Bortolo	s.t.
7	Chloe Hosking (AUS)	Mixed team 1	s.t.
8	Daiva Tušlaitė (LTU)	Lithuania (National team)	s.t.
9	Elena Valentini (ITA)	Servetto Footon	s.t.
10	Irene Bitto (ITA)	Top Girls Fassa Bortolo	s.t.

General classification after stage 3

	Rider	Team	Time
1	Linda Villumsen (NZL)	Wiggle High5	4h 57' 46"
2	Alena Amialiusik (BLR)	Astana BePink	+ 10"
3	Tayler Wiles (USA)	Mixed team 1	+ 12"
4	Rachel Neylan (AUS)	Australia (National team)	+ 19"
5	Lizzie Williams (AUS)	Australia (National team)	+ 23"
6	Charlotte Becker (GER)	Wiggle High5	+ 30"
7	Lucy Coldwell (GBR)	Maxx-Solar	+ 33"
8	Silvia Valsecchi (ITA)	Astana BePink	+ 33"
9	Janel Holcomb (USA)	Team Optum p/b Kelly Benefit Strategies	+ 35"
10	Edwige Pitel (FRA)	Mixed team 2	+ 37"

=== Stage 4 ===
4 September Le Pouzin to Cruas 111.6 km (69.3 mi)

Stage 4 result

	Rider	Team	Time
1	Giorgia Bronzini (ITA)	Wiggle High5	3h 28' 02"
2	Tiffany Cromwell (USA)	Australia (National team)	s.t.
3	Elena Cecchini (ITA)	Estado de México–Faren Kuota	s.t.
4	Lizzie Williams (AUS)	Australia (National team)	s.t.
5	Sheyla Gutiérrez Ruiz (ESP)	Lointek	s.t.
6	Elena Kuchinskaya (RUS)	RusVelo	s.t.
7	Carlee Taylor (AUS)	Australia (National team)	s.t.
8	Chiara Pierobon (ITA)	Top Girls Fassa Bortolo	s.t.
9	Edwige Pitel (FRA)	Mixed team 2	s.t.
10	Tayler Wiles (USA)	Mixed team 1	s.t.

General classification after stage 4

	Rider	Team	Time
1	Linda Villumsen (NZL)	Wiggle High5	8h 25' 48"
2	Tayler Wiles (USA)	Mixed team 1	+ 12"
3	Lizzie Williams (AUS)	Australia (National team)	+ 23"
4	Edwige Pitel (FRA)	Mixed team 2	+ 37"
5	Rossella Ratto (ITA)	Estado de México–Faren Kuota	+ 38"
6	Tiffany Cromwell (AUS)	Australia (National team)	+ 41"
7	Carlee Taylor (AUS)	Australia (National team)	+ 49"
8	Alena Amialiusik (BLR)	Astana BePink	+ 54"
9	Anna Plichta (POL)	TKK Pacific Toruń	+ 56"
10	Elena Cecchini (ITA)	Estado de México–Faren Kuota	+ 59"

=== Stage 5 ===
5 September St. Sauveur de Montagut to Villeneuve-de-Berg 124.1 km (77.1 mi)

Stage 5 result

	Rider	Team	Time
1	Alena Amialiusik (BLR)	Astana BePink	3h 41' 24"
2	Rossella Ratto (ITA)	Estado de México–Faren Kuota	s.t.
3	Amélie Rivat (FRA)	Poitou–Charentes.Futuroscope.86	s.t.
4	Linda Villumsen (NZL)	Wiggle High5	s.t.
5	Tayler Wiles (USA)	Mixed team 1	s.t.
6	Edwige Pitel (FRA)	Mixed team 2	+ 5"
7	Flávia Oliveira (BRA)	Mixed team 2	+ 5"
8	Doris Schweizer (SUI)	Astana BePink	+ 7"
9	Mélodie Lesueur (FRA)	Lointek	+ 6' 58"
10	Uênia Fernandes de Souza (BRA)	Estado de México–Faren Kuota	+ 6' 58"

General classification after stage 5

	Rider	Team	Time
1	Linda Villumsen (NZL)	Wiggle High5	12h 07' 12"
2	Tayler Wiles (USA)	Mixed team 1	+ 12"
3	Rossella Ratto (ITA)	Estado de México–Faren Kuota	+ 38"
4	Edwige Pitel (FRA)	Mixed team 2	+ 42"
5	Alena Amialiusik (BLR)	Astana BePink	+ 54"
6	Amélie Rivat (FRA)	Poitou–Charentes.Futuroscope.86	+ 2' 41"
7	Doris Schweizer (SUI)	Astana BePink	+ 6' 52"
8	Lizzie Williams (AUS)	Australia (National team)	+ 9' 53"
9	Mélodie Lesueur (FRA)	Lointek	+ 10' 00"
10	Carlee Taylor (AUS)	Australia (National team)	+ 10' 19"

=== Stage 6 ===
6 September Grignan to Rochegude 142.8 km (88.7 mi)

=== Stage 7 ===
7 September Grotte de Saint-Martin-d'Ardèche to Bourg-St-Andéol 77.8 km (48.3 mi)

== Classification leadership ==
Stage	Winner	General classification	Young rider classification	Points classification	Mountains classification	Sprints classification	Combination classification	Teams classification
1	Giorgia Bronzini	Giorgia Bronzini	Elena Cecchini	Giorgia Bronzini	Not awarded	Oxana Kozonchuk	Elena Cecchini	Australia (National team)
2 (ITT)	Linda Villumsen	Linda Villumsen	Julie Leth	Tayler Wiles	Alena Amialiusik	Oxana Kozonchuk	Daiva Tušlaitė	Australia (National team)
3	Loren Rowney	Linda Villumsen	Rossella Ratto	Giorgia Bronzini	Rossella Ratto	Elena Cecchini	Alena Amialiusik	Australia (National team)
4	Giorgia Bronzini	Linda Villumsen	Rossella Ratto	Giorgia Bronzini	Alena Amialiusik	Elena Cecchini	Rossella Ratto	Australia (National team)
5	Alena Amialiusik	Linda Villumsen	Rossella Ratto	Giorgia Bronzini	Rossella Ratto	Elena Cecchini	Rossella Ratto	Astana BePink
6	Giorgia Bronzini	Linda Villumsen	Rossella Ratto	Giorgia Bronzini	Rossella Ratto	Elena Cecchini	Rossella Ratto	Astana BePink
7	Kathrin Hammes	Linda Villumsen	Rossella Ratto	Giorgia Bronzini	Rossella Ratto	Elena Cecchini	Rossella Ratto	Astana BePink
Final		Linda Villumsen	Rossella Ratto	Giorgia Bronzini	Rossella Ratto	Elena Cecchini	Rossella Ratto	Astana BePink
