= 2013 Grand Prix el Salvador =

Race details
- Dates: 27 February 2013
- Distance: 99 km (61.52 mi)

Results
	Winner	Silvia Valsecchi (ITA)	(Be Pink)
	Second	Márcia Fernandes Silva (BRA)	
	Third	Martina Růžičková (CZE)	(Pasta Zara–Cogeas)

The 2013 Grand Prix el Salvador was a one-day women's cycle race held in El Salvador on February 27, 2013 over 93.2 km from San Marcos to Zaragoza, La Libertad. The race has an UCI rating of 1.1 and was won by the Italian Silvia Valsecchi of Be Pink.

== Results ==
Result

	Rider	Team	Time
1	Silvia Valsecchi (ITA)	Be Pink	2h 40' 42"
2	Márcia Fernandes Silva (BRA)		+ 18"
3	Martina Růžičková (CZE)	Pasta Zara–Cogeas	+ 1' 17"
4	Clemilda Fernandes Silva (BRA)		+ 1' 30"
5	Noemi Cantele (ITA)	Be Pink	+ 1' 30"
6	Lorena María Vargas (COL)	Pasta Zara–Cogeas	+ 1' 30"
7	Lilibeth Chacón Garcia (VEN)	Bizkaia–Durango	+ 1' 30"
8	Inga Čilvinaitė (LTU)	Pasta Zara–Cogeas	+ 1' 30"
9	Alena Amialiusik (BLR)	Be Pink	+ 1' 30"
10	Ruth Winder (USA)	Vanderkitten	+ 1' 30"
