= Vlaams Wielercentrum Eddy Merckx =

Indoor velodrome in Ghent, Belgium

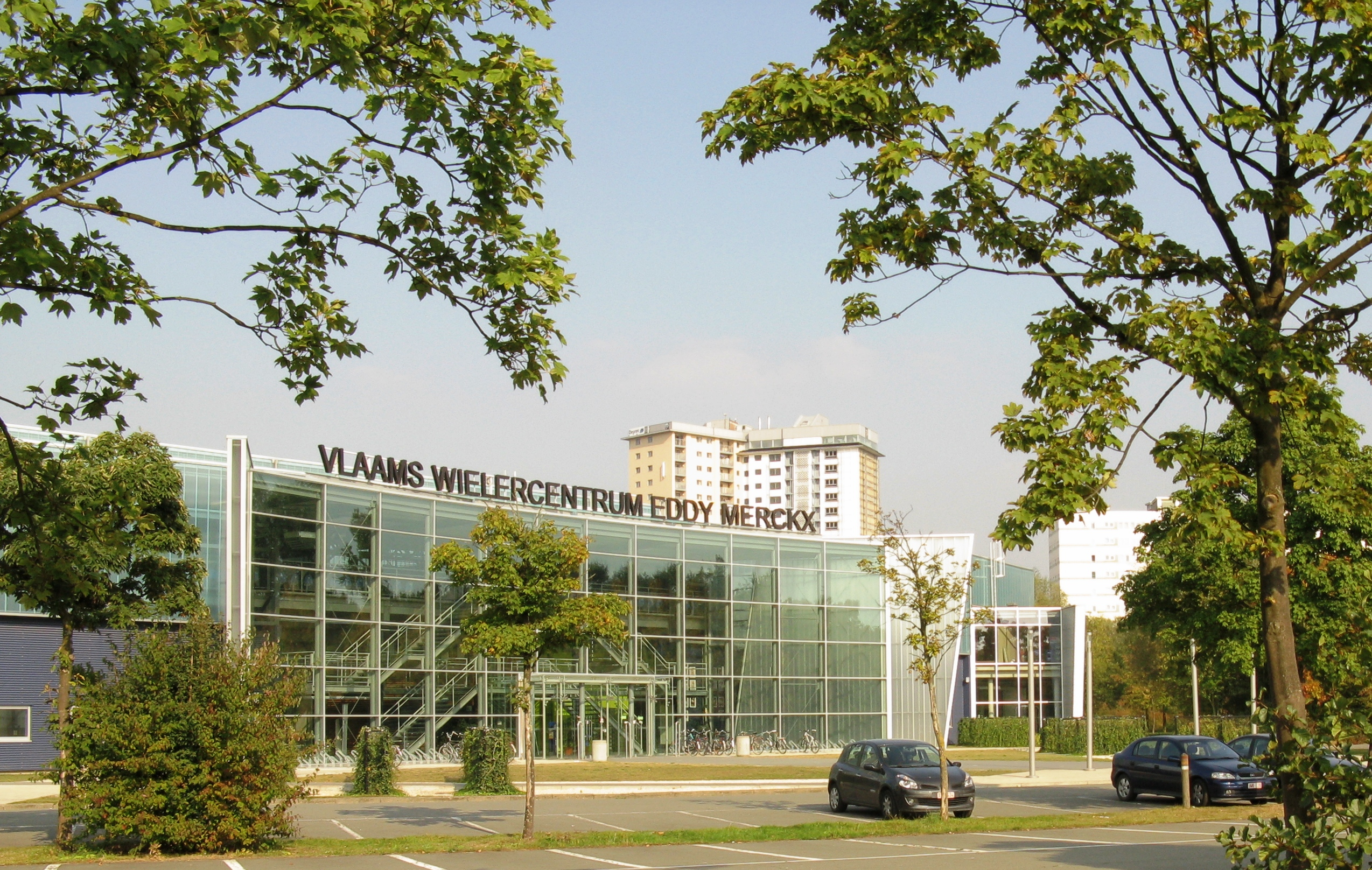
- Interactive map of Vlaams Wielercentrum Eddy Merckx
- Full name: Vlaams Wielercentrum Eddy Merckx
- Location: Blaarmeersen, Ghent (Belgium)
- Coordinates: 51°2′47.5″N 3°41′26.2″E
- Owner: City of Ghent
- Capacity: 5,000 seats
- Surface: wood
- Field size: 250 m (820 ft)

Construction
- Opened: 1988
- Expanded: 2006

Website
- www.sport.vlaanderen/onze-centra/gent/accommodaties/vlaams-wielercentrum-eddy-merckx/

The Flemish Cycling Center Eddy Merckx is a sport complex with indoor cycling track in the Belgian city of Ghent. It is named after the famous Belgian road and track cyclist Eddy Merckx.

The venue hosted the 1988 UCI Track Cycling World Championships and the 2009 European Track Cycling Championships, and for years it is the permanent location of the Belgian National track championships.

== History ==
In 1988, the open-air track "Blaarmeersen" was built in the Blaarmeersen recreation center close to the Watersportbaan in Ghent. The Track Cycling World Championships were organized there that same year. The weather conditions during these world championships were so bad that the competitions had to be postponed several times and the program was delayed. On this basis, the UCI changed the regulations stating that from then on the track cycling world championships had to be organized on an indoor cycling track.

The concept of the semi-covered cycling track was mainly tailored to training. The cycling track itself, the oval on which the race took place, was considered one of the best in Europe, even in the world. However, the ancillary accommodations were minimal, such that extra stands had to be added for important championships.

In 2005, the Blaarmeersen slope was covered after a cooperation agreement between, among others, the Flemish Government, the Royal Belgian Cycling League, Bloso, and the City of Ghent. The "Flemish Cycling Center Eddy Merckx" was officially opened on February 17, 2006. The permanently covered track of 250 meters bears the name of multiple world champion Eddy Merckx.

The first important championships that took place were the Men's and woman's omnium races of the 2009 European Track Championships.

In 2019, it hosted the UEC European Track Championships (under-23 & junior).

== Other sports ==
On June 25, 2009, a BMX track was opened, a track that meets UCI standards. The course is 375 meters long, has 4 dolomite strips, 3 bends and a starting hill with fully automatic starting gates.

Other sports are also be practiced on the center square of the track. There are courts for handball, korfball, volleyball, badminton and cycle ball.

== See also ==
- List of cycling tracks and velodromes
