= Dalia Muccioli =

Italian cyclist

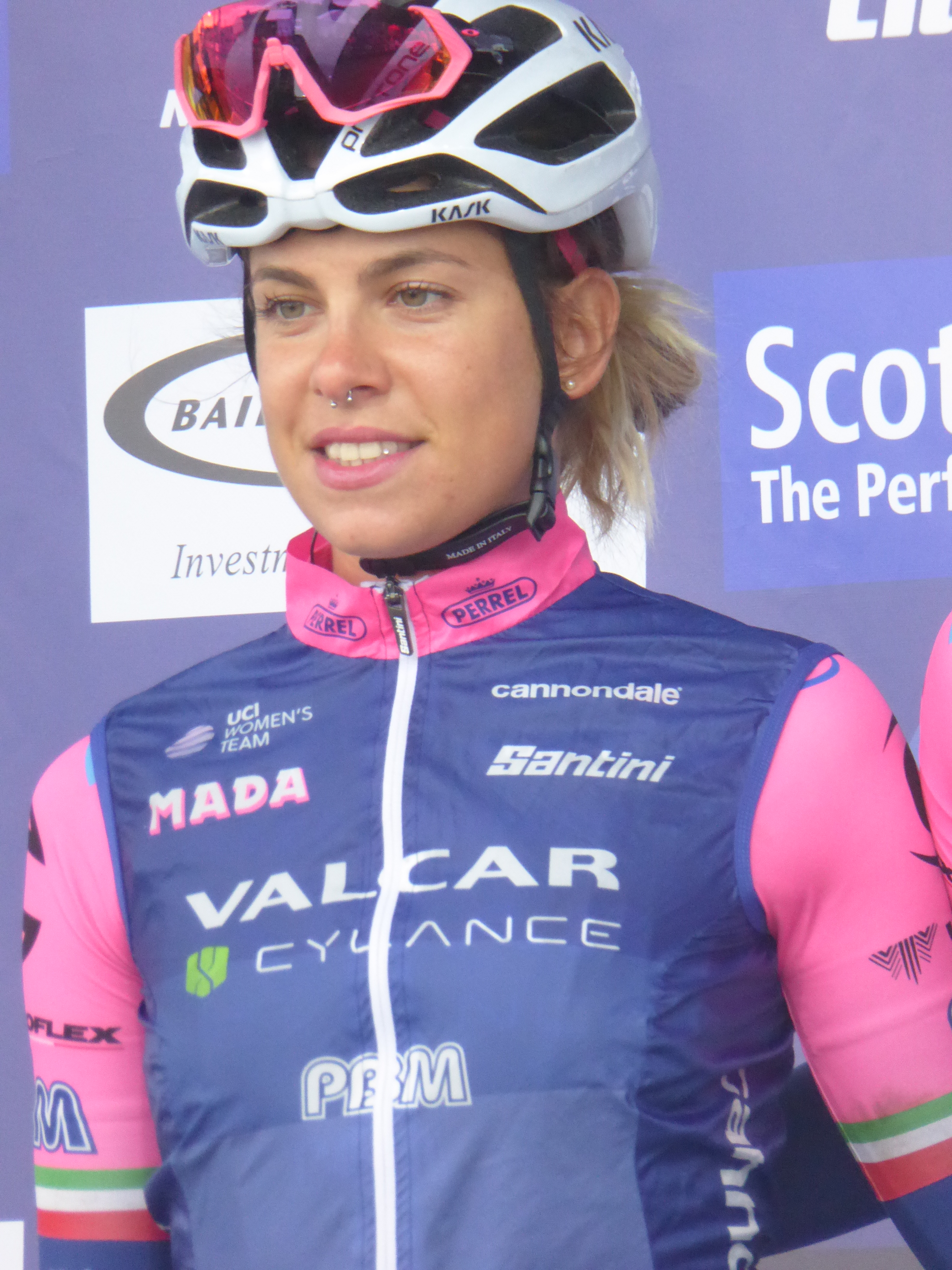
- Muccioli at the 2019 Women's Tour of Scotland

Personal information
- Full name: Dalia Muccioli
- Born: 22 May 1993 (age 33) Cesenatico, Italy

Cycling career
- Sport: Cycling
- Current team: Retired
- Discipline: Road
- Role: Rider

Professional teams
- 2012–2014: Be Pink
- 2015–2016: Alé–Cipollini
- 2017–2019: Valcar–PBM

Dalia Muccioli (born 22 May 1993) is an Italian former racing cyclist, who rode professionally between 2012 and 2019, for the Astana BePink Women Team, Alé–Cipollini and Valcar–Cylance teams. She competed in the 2013 UCI women's team time trial in Florence, and won the Italian National Road Race Championships in the same year.

Following her retirement, Muccioli now works as a tour guide for a cycling tours and adventure company.

== Major results ==
2012
10th Overall La Route de France
2013
1st Road race, National Road Championships
1st Stage 1a (TTT) Giro del Trentino Alto Adige-Südtirol
8th Road race, UEC European Under-23 Road Championships
2014
4th Giro dell'Emilia Internazionale Donne Elite
8th Overall Gracia-Orlová
10th Overall Vuelta a El Salvador

1st Young rider classification

2015
3rd Road race, National Road Championships
2018
4th Overall Tour of Chongming Island

== See also ==
- 2014 Astana BePink Women's Team season
