= Silvia Valsecchi =

Italian cyclist

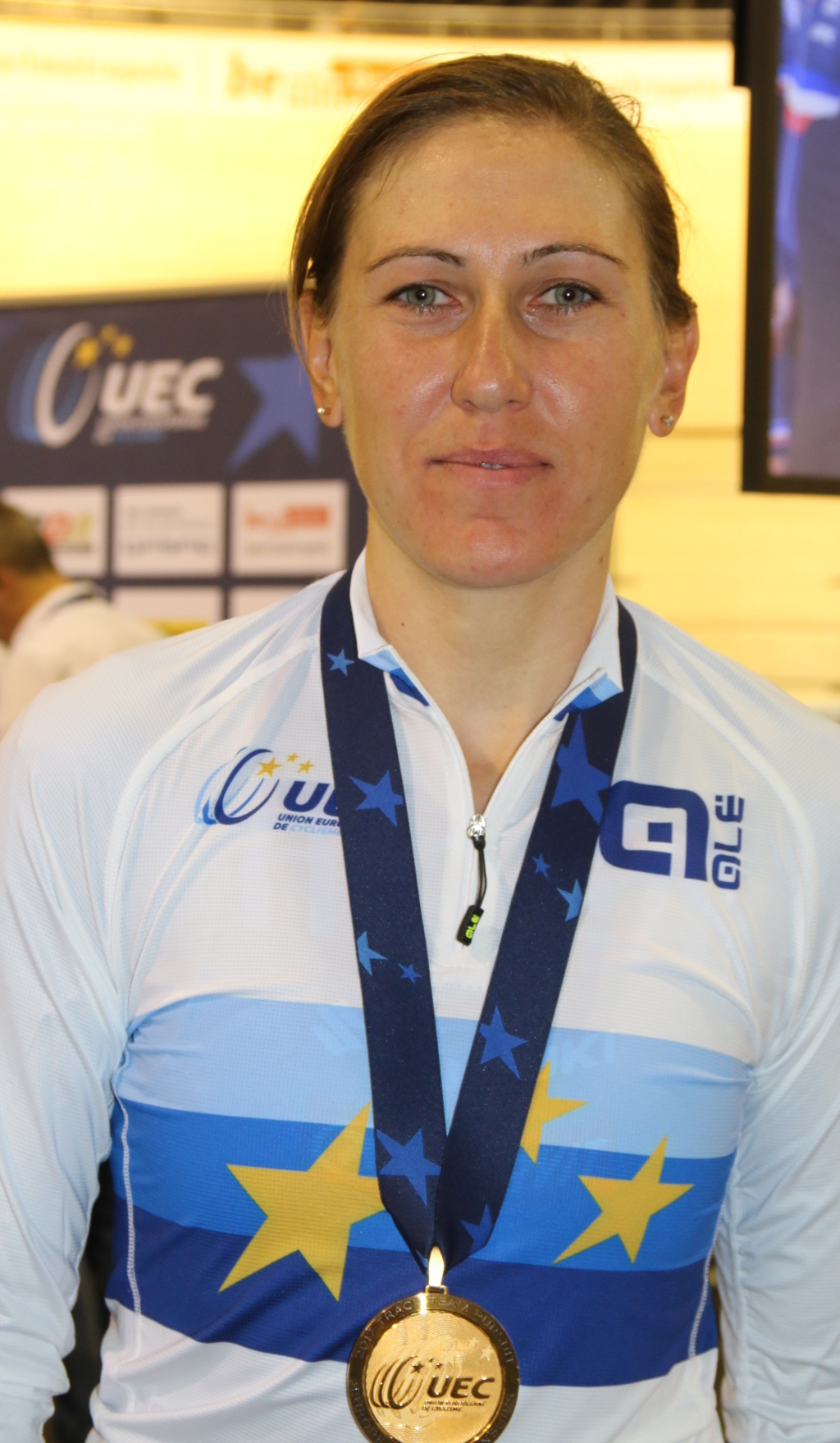
- Valsecchi in 2017

Personal information
- Full name: Silvia Valsecchi
- Born: 19 July 1982 (age 44) Lecco, Italy

Cycling career
- Sport: Cycling
- Current team: Retired
- Disciplines: Road; Track
- Role: Rider

Professional teams
- 2002–2009: Itera Team
- 2010–2011: Top Girls Fassa Bortolo–Ghezzi
- 2012–2021: Be Pink
Medal record
Representing Italy
Women's track cycling
World Championships
Bronze medal – third place	2018 Apeldoorn	Team pursuit
European Championships
Gold medal – first place	2016 Yvelines	Team pursuit
Gold medal – first place	2017 Berlin	Team pursuit
Silver medal – second place	2018 Glasgow	Team pursuit
Bronze medal – third place	2014 Baie-Mahault	Team pursuit
Bronze medal – third place	2017 Berlin	Individual pursuit
Bronze medal – third place	2020 Plovdiv	Individual pursuit
Women's road cycling
European Championships
Bronze medal – third place	2019 Alkmaar	Mixed team relay

Silvia Valsecchi (born 19 July 1982) is an Italian former racing cyclist, who rode professionally between 2002 and 2021 for the Itera Team, Top Girls–Fassa Bortolo and Bepink. She competed in the 2013 UCI women's team time trial in Florence.

== Major results ==
=== Road ===
2004
8th Chrono Champenois
2005
3rd Time trial, National Road Championships
4th Chrono Champenois
2006
1st Time trial, National Road Championships
3rd Overall Tour Féminin en Limousin
2007
3rd Time trial, National Road Championships
9th Overall Tour Féminin en Limousin
2008
3rd Time trial, National Road Championships
2009
3rd Time trial, National Road Championships
8th Memorial Davide Fardelli
2010
2nd Time trial, National Road Championships
10th Memorial Davide Fardelli
2011
National Road Championships

2nd Time trial
3rd Road race

2012
1st Stage 6 Vuelta a El Salvador
2nd Road race, National Road Championships
2013
1st Grand Prix el Salvador
1st Stage 2 (TTT) Vuelta a El Salvador
3rd Time trial, National Road Championships
2014
3rd Team time trial, UCI Road World Championships
2015
1st Time trial, National Road Championships
4th Overall Tour de Bretagne Féminin
8th Ljubljana–Domžale–Ljubljana TT
2016
3rd Time trial, National Road Championships
4th Overall Tour de Bretagne Féminin

1st Stage 2 (ITT)

2017
1st Stage 1 (TTT) Setmana Ciclista Valenciana
1st Stage 4 Tour Cycliste Féminin International de l'Ardèche
3rd Time trial, National Road Championships
2018
6th VR Women ITT
8th Horizon Park Women Challenge
8th Ljubljana–Domžale–Ljubljana TT
2019
3rd Mixed team relay, UEC European Road Championships

=== Track ===
2013
Copa Internacional de Pista

2nd Points race
3rd Individual pursuit

2014
1st Individual pursuit, International Belgian Open
3rd Team pursuit, UEC European Track Championships
2016
1st Team pursuit, UEC European Track Championships
2017
UEC European Track Championships

1st Team pursuit
3rd Individual pursuit

Team pursuit, 2017–18 UCI Track Cycling World Cup

1st Pruszków
2nd Manchester
2nd Santiago

2nd Team pursuit, 2016–17 UCI Track Cycling World Cup, Cali
2018
2nd Team pursuit, UEC European Track Championships
Team pursuit, 2018–19 UCI Track Cycling World Cup

2nd Milton
3rd Saint-Quentin-en-Yvelines
3rd London

3rd Team pursuit, UCI Track Cycling World Championships
2019
3rd Team pursuit, 2019–20 UCI Track Cycling World Cup, Glasgow
2020
3rd Individual pursuit, UEC European Track Championships

== See also ==
- 2014 Astana BePink Women's Team season
