= Camilla Alessio =

Italian cyclist

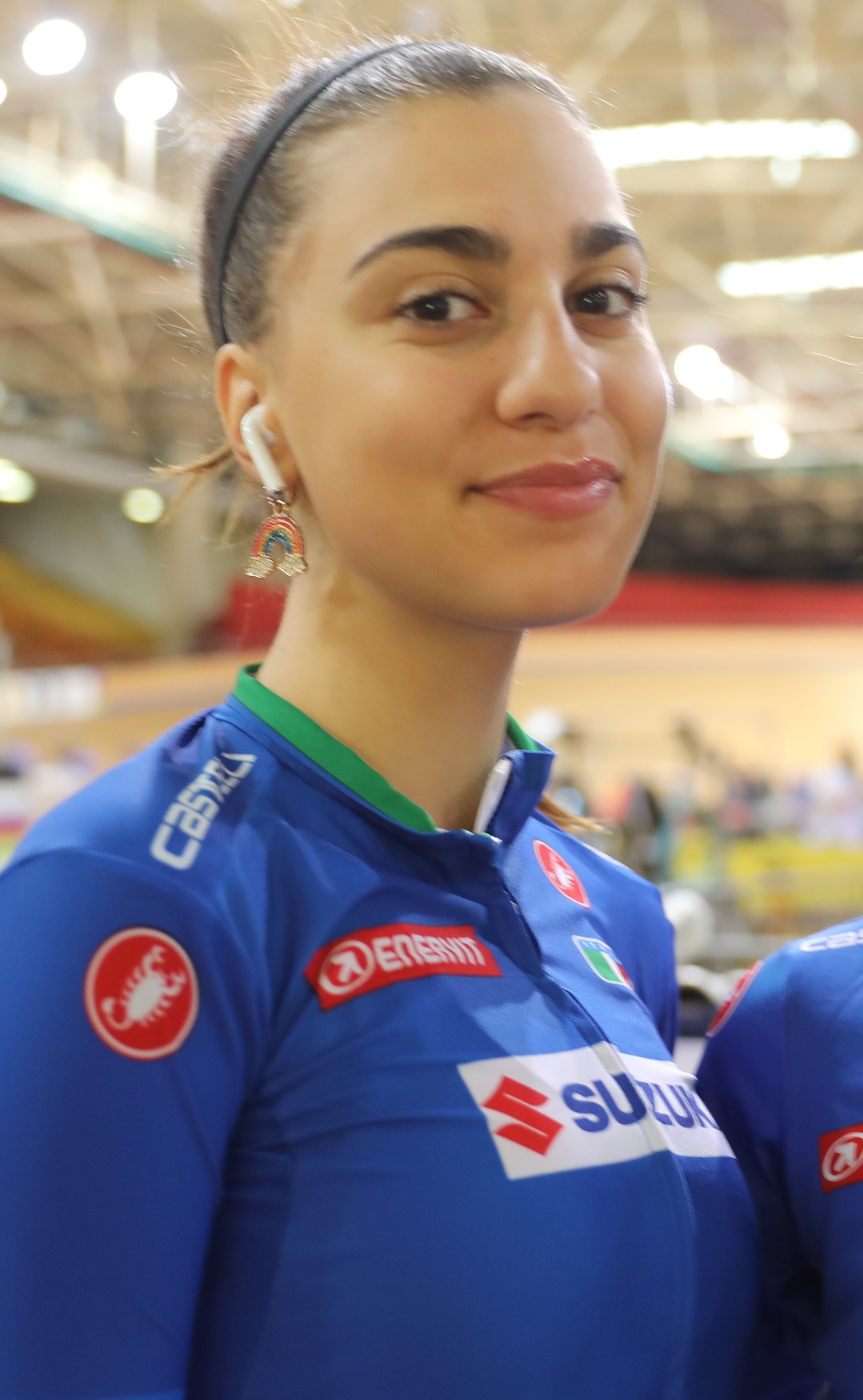
- Alessio at the 2019 UCI Junior Track Cycling World Championships

Personal information
- Born: 23 July 2001 (age 25) Cittadella, Italy

Cycling career
- Sport: Cycling
- Current team: Vini Fantini–BePink
- Disciplines: Road; Track
- Role: Rider

Professional team
- 2020–: Bepink

Camilla Alessio (born 23 July 2001) is an Italian professional racing cyclist, who currently rides for UCI Women's Continental Team Vini Fantini–BePink.
