= 2014 Grand Prix el Salvador =

Race details
- Dates: 8 March 2014
- Stages: 1
- Distance: 93.2 km (57.9 mi)
- Winning time: 2h 18' 50"

Results
	Winner	Alena Amialiusik (BLR)	(Astana BePink)
	Second	Olga Zabelinskaya (RUS)	(RusVelo)
	Third	Mara Abbott (USA)	(UnitedHealthcare)

The 2014 Grand Prix el Salvador was a one-day women's cycle race held in El Salvador on March 8 2014 over 93.2 km from San Marcos to Zaragoza. The race has an UCI rating of 1.1 and was won by the Belarusian Alena Amialiusik of Astana BePink.

== Results ==
	Rider	Team	Time
1	Alena Amialiusik (BLR)	Astana BePink	2h 18' 50"
2	Olga Zabelinskaya (RUS)	RusVelo	+ 2"
3	Mara Abbott (USA)	UnitedHealthcare	+ 4"
4	Sharon Laws (GBR)	UnitedHealthcare	+ 4"
5	Doris Schweizer (SUI)	Astana BePink	+ 30"
6	Katie Hall (USA)	UnitedHealthcare	+ 34"
7	Tetyana Riabchenko (UKR)	DNA Cycling-K4	+ 39"
8	Laura Lozano (COL)	Fundación San Mateo-IDRD-Liga de Bogotá	+ 42"
9	Sari Saarelainen (FIN)	D'Maiz	+ 45"
10	Elena Kuchinskaya (RUS)	RusVelo	+ 1' 13"
