= Ana Figuero =

Chilean educator, feminist, activist, and government official

Ana Figueroa
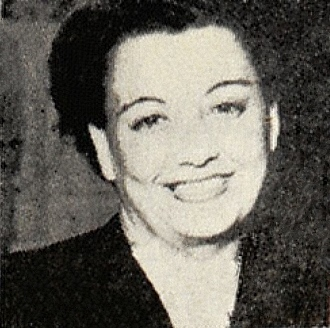
- Born: Ana Figueroa; 19 June 1907; Santiago, Chile
- Died: 1970 (aged 62–63); Santiago
- Occupations: Feminist, suffragist, government official, UN diplomat, Senior executive in ILO
- Years active: 1947 to 1967
- Known for: Work in UN and ILO
- Notable work: Woman's suffrage, Modernizing schooling education system in Chile, UN diplomat and International Labour Organization

Ana Figueroa (June 19, 1907 - 1970) (Note: 1908 is also mentioned as year of birth; 1997 is also mentioned as year of death.) was a Chilean educator, feminist, political activist, and government official.

== Biography ==
Figuero was born in Santiago on 19 June 1907 as the daughter of Miguel Figueroa Rebolledo and Ana Gajardo Infante. She studied at the University of Chile and graduated in 1928. She became a professor of English in 1928. She then worked as Director of the Liceo San Felipe in 1938 and the Liceo de Temuco during 1939. She then continued her further studies in USA at the Columbia University Teachers College in 1946 and in the Colorado State College (Greely) in 1946.

From 1947 until 1949, she was the general supervisor for Chile's high school system. She promoted universal suffrage in 1948 in the capacity of president of the Chilean Federation of Women's institutions (Federación Chilena de Instituciones Femeninas), which was achieved gradually between 1931 and 1952. From 1949 to 1950, she was head of the Women's Bureau of the Ministry of Foreign Affairs.

She taught psychology in the University school for social workers. She was also a journalist in Social Periodistica del Sur.

Between 1950 and 1952 she represented Chile as "Minister plenipotentiary" to the Third General Assembly of the United Nations. She was envoy on the Commissions on Human Rights. She was also president of the Social, Cultural and Humanitarian Committee. In 1952, she attended the UN Security Council. Then, she was represented on several key positions at the UN, which included looking into issues related to refugees from all regions of the world. In 1952 she also attended the UN Security Council. In 1952, she joined as Assistant Director General of the International Labour Organization devolved with duties related to women's issues. She also worked in ILO as Assistant Secretary General of several sessions of the Annual Conference and attended many regional conferences.

Figuero was the first women to chair a United Nations committee of the General Assembly; the first woman on the United Nations Security Council and United Nations Office for Disarmament Affairs; and the first woman to hold the position of assistant director general of the International Labour Organization.

Figuero took retirement from ILO in later half of 1967 due to reasons of poor health. She died in 1970. After her retirement, at the Governing Body session and subsequent to her death many of her colleagues paid rich tributes to her. Some of the tributes are as follows:

"Anita Figuero knew how to arrange her work. She acted in defense of freedom for more than 25 years. Dedicated also to the creative work of the ILO she won the affection of all those who encountered her there."

"In expressing our condolences on the death of this great lady, it only remains for me on behalf of the workers of America, to undertake to honour her memory by defending while we live the noble ideals of justice which always inspired her actions and her personality."

"She has a unique place in the hearts of us all. She has the gift of speaking like Chilean wine. She is for all of us the beloved symbol of the grace and charm, of the warmth and gaiety of Latin America."

== Memberships ==
Figuero was a Member of Social de Profesores, Federaciaon Chilena de Instituiciones Femeninans, Sindicato de Profesores Chilenos, Ateneo (Temuco), and Honorary member of the Society of Cultural Interamericanea (Buenos Aires).

== Publications ==
Figuero authored a book titled Educacion sexual (1934).

== Bibliography ==
- Bizzarro, Salvatore (20 April 2005). Historical Dictionary of Chile. Scarecrow Press. ISBN 978-0-8108-6542-6.
- Editors of the American Heritage Dictionaries (2005). The Riverside Dictionary of Biography. Houghton Mifflin Harcourt. ISBN 0-618-49337-9.
- Hilton, Ronald (1947). Who's Who in Latin America: Part IV, Bolivia, Chile and Peru. Stanford University Press. ISBN 978-0-8047-0737-4.
- Kinnear, Karen L. (22 July 2011). Women in Developing Countries: A Reference Handbook: A Reference Handbook. ABC-CLIO. ISBN 978-1-59884-426-9.
- Lubin, Carol Riegelman; Winslow, Anne (1990). Social Justice for Women: The International Labor Organization and Women. Duke University Press. p. 201. ISBN 0-8223-1062-7.
- Olsen, Kirstin (1 January 1994). Chronology of Women's History. Greenwood Publishing Group. p. 273. ISBN 978-0-313-28803-6.
