= Giorgia Catarzi =

Italian cyclist

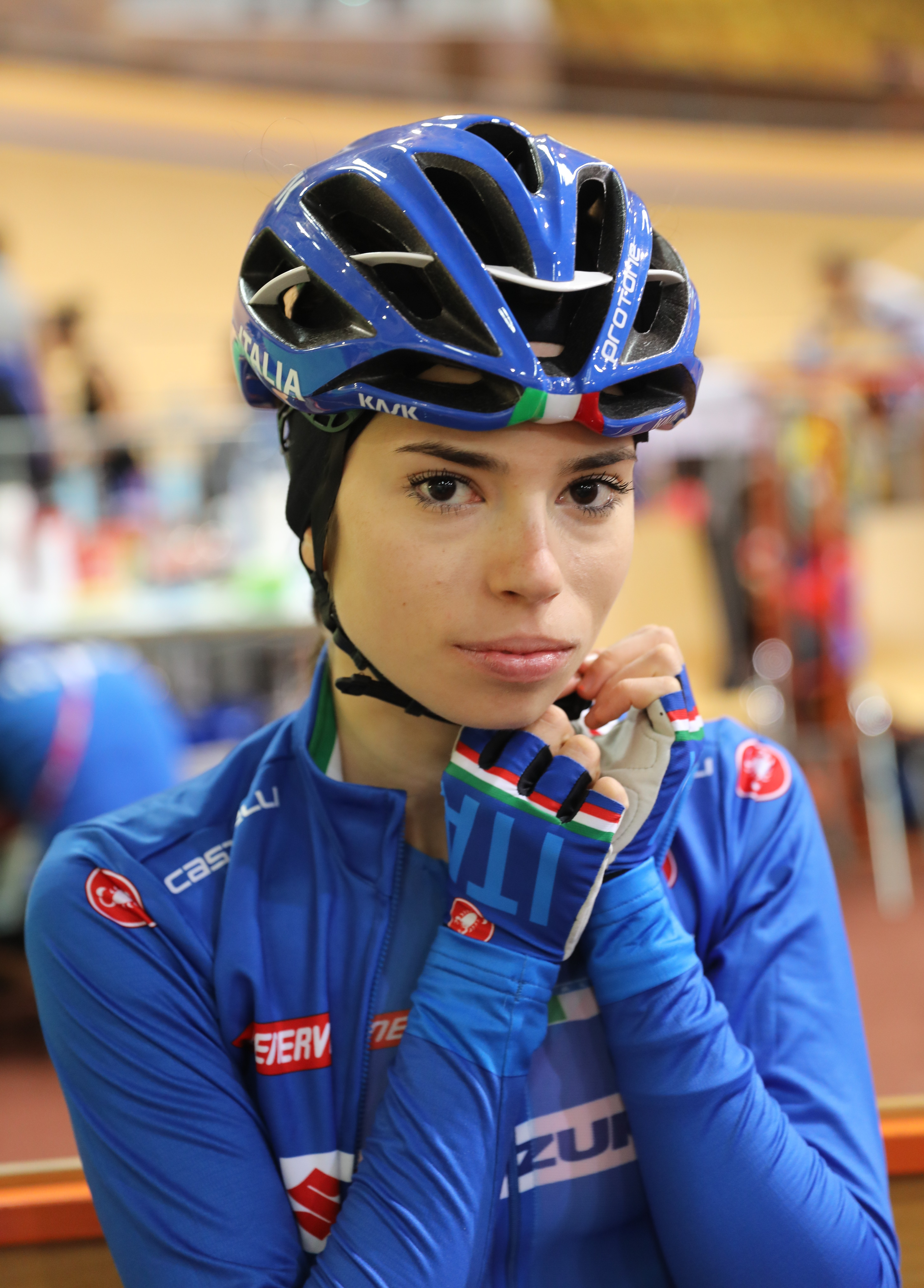
- Catarzi in 2019

Personal information
- Born: 15 June 2001 (age 25)

Cycling career
- Sport: Cycling
- Current team: Vini Fantini–BePink
- Disciplines: Road; Track
- Role: Rider

Professional team
- 2020–: Bepink

Giorgia Catarzi (born 15 June 2001) is an Italian professional racing cyclist, who currently rides for UCI Women's Continental Team Vini Fantini–BePink.
