= Bepink =

Italian cycling team

Team information
- UCI code: BPK
- Registered: Italy
- Founded: 2012
- Discipline: Road
- Status: UCI Women's Team (2012–2019); UCI Women's Continental Team (2020–present)
- Bicycles: Kemo
- Website: Team home page

Key personnel
- General manager: Walter Zini

Team name history
- 2012–2013 2014 2015 2016 2017 2018–22 2023 2024 2025: BePink; Astana BePink Women Team; BePink–La Classica; Bepink; Bepink–Cogeas; Bepink; BePink–GOLD; BePink–Bongioanni; Bepink–Imatra–Bongioanni

Bepink (UCI team code: BPK) is a professional women's cycling team based in Italy, which competes in elite road bicycle racing events such as the UCI Women's World Tour.

== Team history ==
=== 2014 ===
In November, it was announced that Astana would be moving sponsorship and resources away from the team, creating a new Kazakhstan based Women's team, Astana–Acca Due O. As a result, BePink stated it would partner with Italian apparel brand, La Classica. For 2015 the team raced under the name BePink–La Classica.

==== Riders in ====
On June 1, Ksenyia Tuhai joined the team. On August 1, 2014, Alison Tetrick joined the team along with Aliya Kargaliyeva as a stagiaire. On November 7, Ksenia Tuhai, Michela Maltese, Ana Covrig and Silvia Valsecchi. On November 8 the team signed Ilaria Sanguineti. On November 13 the team signed Ilaira Bonomi, Georgia Fraiegari, Tereza Medveďová, Jaime Nielsen, with Georgia Williams signing a contract extension. On November 14 the team signed Ruby Livingstone. On 18 November the team signed Simona Bortolotti and Anastasia Chulkova. On December 11, 2015, it was announced that Canadian cyclist Lex Albrecht signed with the team for the 2016 season.

==== Riders out ====
On October 30, Alice Algisi, Simona Frapporti and Dalia Muccioli left the team to join Alé–Cipollini for the 2015 season. On November 19 Barbara Guarischi and Alena Amialiusik left the team to join Velocio–SRAM. As a result of the creation of the new Kazakh-based team a number of Kazakh riders left the team. On November 28, Marzhan Baitlevova, Makhabbat Umutzhanova and Aliya Kargaliyeva left the team to join Astana-Acca Due O.

== Team roster ==
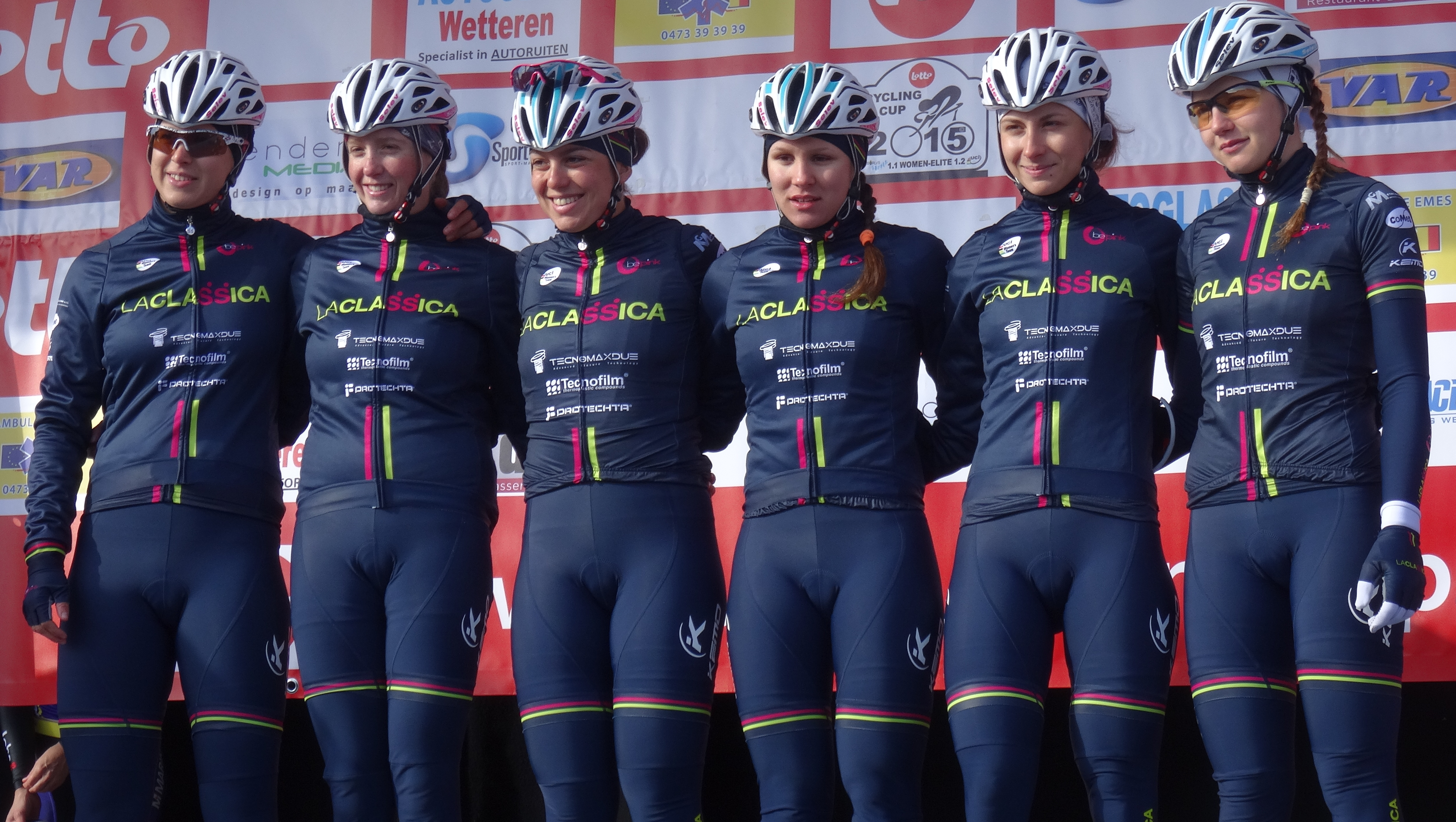
The squad during the 2015 Le Samyn des Dames

As of 13 May 2021.

Rider	Date of birth
Camilla Alessio (ITA)	23 July 2001 (age 25)
Vania Canvelli (ITA)	21 October 1997 (age 28)
Giorgia Catarzi (ITA)	15 June 2001 (age 25)
Lara Crestanello (ITA)	21 March 2002 (age 24)
Michaela Drummond (NZL)	5 April 1998 (age 28)
Markéta Hájková (CZE)	14 March 2000 (age 26)
Nora Jenčušová (SVK)	14 April 2002 (age 24)

Rider	Date of birth
Chiara Perini (ITA)	9 December 1997 (age 28)
Nadia Quagliotto (ITA)	22 March 1997 (age 29)
Prisca Savi (ITA)	21 March 2002 (age 24)
Silvia Valsecchi (ITA)	19 July 1982 (age 44)
Matilde Vitillo (ITA)	8 March 2001 (age 25)
Silvia Zanardi (ITA)	3 March 2000 (age 26)

== Major wins ==
2012
Grand Prix El Salvador, Noemi Cantele
Stage 1 Vuelta Ciclista Femenina a el Salvador, Noemi Cantele
Stage 6 Vuelta Ciclista Femenina a el Salvador, Silvia Valsecchi
Grand Prix Grand Saint Bernard, Evelyn García
GP Liberazione — WE, Noemi Cantele
Stage 1 Tour of Adygeya WE, Yuliya Martisova
Stage 1 Giro del Trentino Alto Adige-Südtirol, Noemi Cantele
Prologue Route de France Féminine, Alena Amialiusik
Stage 3 Route de France Féminine, Simona Frapporti
2013
Grand Prix San Miguel, Noemi Cantele
Overall Vuelta a El Salvador, Noemi Cantele

Stages 1 & 4, Noemi Cantele

Grand Prix El Salvador, Silvia Valsecchi
Youth classification Festival Luxembourgeois du cyclisme féminin, Georgia Williams
Mountains classification Tour Languedoc Roussillon, Alena Amialiusik

Youth classification, Georgia Williams

Stage 1a (TTT) Giro del Trentino Alto Adige-Südtirol
Stage 2 (ITT) Tour Cycliste Féminin International de l'Ardèche, Alena Amialiusik
2014
Mountains classification Vuelta Internacional Femenina a Costa Rica, Alena Amialiusik

Youth classification, Susanna Zorzi
Stage 3, Alena Amialiusik

Grand Prix el Salvador, Alena Amialiusik
Points classification Vuelta a El Salvador, Alena Amialiusik

Sprints classification, Anna Stricker
Youth classification Dalia Muccioli
Teams classification
Stages 1 & 2, Alena Amialiusik

Stage 1 Tour de Bretagne Féminin, Doris Schweizer
Teams classification Tour Cycliste Féminin International de l'Ardèche

Stage 5, Alena Amialiusik

Combativity award Stage 4 Boels Rental Ladies Tour, Alison Tetrick
2015
Stage 3 Tour of Zhoushan Island, Anastasia Chulkova
Overall Tour de Bretagne Féminin, Ilaria Sanguineti

Youth classification, Ilaria Sanguineti

Team classification

Stage 1, Ilaria Sanguineti

2016
Chrono de Gatineau, Amber Neben
Stage 2 (ITT) Tour de Bretagne Feminin, Silvia Valsecchi
Stage 4 Tour de Bretagne Feminin, Ilaria Sanguineti
Overall La Route de France, Amber Neben

Stages 4 (ITT) & 5, Amber Neben

2017
Youth classification Emakumeen Bira, Nikola Nosková
Giro del Trentino Alto Adige-Sudtirol, Nikola Nosková
Youth classification Tour Cycliste Féminin International de l'Ardèche, Nikola Nosková

Stage 4, Silvia Valsecchi
Combativity award Stage 1, Silvia Valsecchi

2018
Stage 7 Tour Cycliste Féminin International de l'Ardèche, Erica Magnaldi
2019
Mountains classification Vuelta a Burgos Feminas, Katia Ragusa
2020
Stage 4 Women's Tour Down Under, Simona Frapporti
2022
Youth classification Vuelta a Burgos Feminas, Silvia Zanardi
Stage 2 Vuelta a Burgos Feminas, Matilde Vitillo
Visegrad 4 Ladies Series Hungary, Silvia Zanardi
Stage 4 Tour International des Pyrénées, Silvia Zanardi
Stage 6 Tour de l'Ardèche, Silvia Zanardi
Stages 2 & 4 Vuelta a Formosa, Valentina Basilico

== National champions ==
2012
Belarus Time Trial, Alena Amialiusik
2013
Belarus Road Race, Alena Amialiusik
Switzerland Road Race, Doris Schweizer
Italy Road Race, Dalia Muccioli
Belarus Time Trial, Alena Amialiusik
2014
Belarus Time Trial, Alena Amialiusik
Belarus Road Race, Alena Amialiusik
Italy Track (500m Time Trial), Simona Frapporti
Italy Track (Omnium), Simona Frapporti
Italy Track (Individual pursuit), Silvia Valsecchi
2015
New Zealand Time Trial, Jaime Nielsen
New Zealand Track (Individual pursuit), Jaime Nielsen
Slovakia Time Trial, Tereza Medveďová
Italy Time Trial, Silvia Valsecchi
Romania Road Race, Ana Maria Covrig
Romania Time Trial, Ana Maria Covrig
2016
World Time Trial, Amber Neben
European Track (Team pursuit), Silvia Valsecchi
European Track (Team pursuit), Francesca Pattaro
2017
Russian Track (Points race), Olga Zabelinskaya
Czech Time Trial, Nikola Nosková
Czech Road Race, Nikola Nosková
European Track (Team Pursuit), Silvia Valsecchi
2018
Slovakia Road Race, Tereza Medveďová
Slovakia Track (500m Time Trial), Tereza Medveďová
Slovakia Track (Individual Pursuit), Tereza Medveďová
European Under-23 Road, Nikola Nosková
2019
Slovakia Track (500m Time Trial), Tereza Medveďová
Slovakia Track (Individual Pursuit), Tereza Medveďová
2020
European U23 Track (Points race), Silvia Zanardi
2021
Slovakia Track (Individual Pursuit), Nora Jenčušová
European U23 Track (Individual Pursuit), Silvia Zanardi
European U23 Track (Team Pursuit), Silvia Zanardi
European U23 Track (Points race), Silvia Zanardi
European U23 Road Race, Silvia Zanardi
2022
Slovakia Time Trial, Nora Jenčušová
Slovakia Road Race, Nora Jenčušová
European U23 (Team Pursuit), Matilde Vitillo
European U23 (Team Pursuit), Silvia Zanardi
European U23 (Madison), Matilde Vitillo
European U23 (Madison), Silvia Zanardi
European U23 (Points race), Silvia Zanardi
