= Vuelta a El Salvador =

Race details
- Date: April-may
- Region: El Salvador
- English name: Tour of El Salvador
- Discipline: Road race
- Competition: UCI America Tour
- Type: Stage race
- Organiser: Rubén Contreras Schweizer
- Web site: www.vueltaelsalvador.com

History
- First edition: 1964
- Editions: 25 (as of 2006)
- First winner: Armando Paniagua (GUA)
- Most recent: Wilson Zambrano (COL)

The Vuelta Ciclista a El Salvador (English: Tour of El Salvador) is a multi-day road bicycle racing stage race held annually in late April and early May in El Salvador. The Vuelta a El Salvador carries a UCI rating of 2.2 and is part of the UCI America Tour, which is one of six UCI Continental Circuits sponsored by the Union Cycliste Internationale, the sport's international governing body.

== Men’s race Past winners ==
Year	Winner	Country	Team
1964	Armando Paniagua	Guatemala	
1965	Juan Jose Pontaza	Guatemala	
1966–1967	No Event		
1968	Julio Patricio Merino	El Salvador	
1969–1972	No Event		
1973	Antonio "Pato" Funes	El Salvador	
1974	Fernando Moreno	Mexico	
1975	Pedro Acu Tura	Guatemala	
1976	No Event		
1977	Arquímedes Jaén	Panama	
1978	No Event		
1979	Roberto "Cuque" López	Guatemala	
1980	No Event		
1981	Gregorio Rodríguez	Guatemala	
1982	Carlos Aguilar	Guatemala	
1983	Rafael Ernesto Chávez	El Salvador	
1984	Arsenio Chaparro	Colombia	
1985	Héctor Julio Patarroyo	Colombia	Café Quetzal-Leche Klim
1986	Julio Carlos Morales	El Salvador	
1987	Jorge Landaverde	El Salvador	
1988	Luis Pérez	Colombia	Colombia
1989	Jair Bernal	Colombia	Colombia
1990	Marcos Wilches	Colombia	Colombia
1991	Luis Fernando Lara	Colombia	Colombia
1992	José Daniel Bernal	Colombia	Colombia
1993	Luis Cárdenas	Colombia	Colombia
1994	Fredy Núñez	Cuba	
1995–2003	No Event		
2004	Enrique Avalos	El Salvador	
2005	Cameron Hughes	Australia	
2006	Gregorio Ladino	Colombia	Colombia
2007	Wilson Zambrano	Colombia	Colombia es Pasión

== Women’s Race Past Winners ==
Year	Winner	Country	Team
2004	Evelyn García	El Salvador	Banco Cuscatlan - Cogeas
2005	Edita Pučinskaitė	Lithuania	Nobili Rubinetterie - Menikini - Cogeas
2006	Aimee Vasse	United States	Tria - USA
2007	Evelyn García	El Salvador	Team Cmax Dila - Guericiotti - Cogeas
2008	Tetyana Styazhkina	Ukraine	USC Chirio Forno d'Asolo
2009–2011	No event		
2012	Clemilda Fernandes Silva	Brazil	USC Chirio Forno d'Asolo
2013			
2014	Mara Abbott	United States	UnitedHealthcare
2015–2023	No event		
2024	Elena Hartmann	Switzerland	Roland Cycling

=== Jersey classifications ===
As of the 2014 edition of the race, the following jerseys were awarded:

General classification: the rider with the lowest overall accumulated time
Points classification: the rider who has scored the highest number of points
Sprints classification: the rider who has scored the highest number of points from intermediate sprints
Mountains classification: the rider who has scored the highest number of points from specified climbs
Combativity classification: the rider who has been the most aggressive
Young rider classification: the rider with the lowest overall accumulated time under a specified age
Best Salvadorean rider: the rider with the lowest overall accumulated time from El Salvador
