= 2014 in women's road cycling =

2014 in women's road cycling is about the 2014 women's bicycle races ruled by the UCI and the 2014 UCI Women's Teams.

== UCI Road World Rankings ==
Final ranking 2014

Top-ranked individual	Second-ranked individual	Third-ranked individual	Top-ranked team	Top-ranked nation
Marianne Vos (NED); Rabobank-Liv Woman Cycling Team	Emma Johansson (SWE); Orica–AIS	Lizzie Armitstead (GBR); Boels–Dolmans	Rabobank-Liv Woman Cycling Team	Netherlands

== World Championships ==
The World Road Championships is set to be held in Ponferrada, Spain.

Race	Date	Winner	Second	Third
World Championship Team Time Trial	September 21	(United States) Specialized–lululemon	(Australia) Orica–AIS	(Italy) Astana BePink Women's Team
World Championship Team Time Trial	September 21	Chantal Blaak (NED); Lisa Brennauer (GER); Karol-Ann Canuel (CAN); Carmen Small (USA); Evelyn Stevens (USA); Trixi Worrack (GER)	Annette Edmondson (AUS); Melissa Hoskins (AUS); Emma Johansson (SWE); Jessie MacLean (AUS); Valentina Scandolara (ITA); Amanda Spratt (AUS)	Alena Amialiusik (BLR); Simona Frapporti (ITA); Doris Schweizer (SUI); Alison Tetrick (USA); Silvia Valsecchi (ITA); Susanna Zorzi (ITA)
World Championship Time Trial	September 23	Lisa Brennauer (GER)	Hanna Solovey (UKR)	Evelyn Stevens (USA)
World Championship Road Race	September 27	Pauline Ferrand-Prévot (FRA)	Lisa Brennauer (GER)	Emma Johansson (SWE)

== UCI World Cup ==
Race	Date	Winner	Second	Third
(Netherlands) Ronde van Drenthe	15 March	Lizzie Armitstead (GBR)	Anna van der Breggen (NED)	Shelley Olds (USA)
(Italy) Trofeo Alfredo Binda-Comune di Cittiglio	30 March	Emma Johansson (SWE)	Lizzie Armitstead (GBR)	Alena Amialiusik (BLR)
(Belgium) Tour of Flanders	6 April	Ellen van Dijk (NED)	Lizzie Armitstead (GBR)	Emma Johansson (SWE)
(Belgium) La Flèche Wallonne Féminine	23 April	Pauline Ferrand-Prévot (FRA)	Lizzie Armitstead (GBR)	Elisa Longo Borghini (ITA)
(China) Tour of Chongming Island World Cup	18 May	Kirsten Wild (NED)	Elena Cecchini (ITA)	Giorgia Bronzini (ITA)
(Germany) Sparkassen Giro	3 August	Marianne Vos (NED)	Giorgia Bronzini (ITA)	Lotta Lepistö (FIN)
(Sweden) Open de Suède Vårgårda TTT	22 August	Specialized–lululemon; Lisa Brennauer (GER); Chantal Blaak (NED); Karol-Ann Canuel (CAN); Carmen Small (USA); Evelyn Stevens (USA); Trixi Worrack (GER)	Rabobank-Liv Woman Cycling Team; Lucinda Brand (NED); Thalita de Jong (NED); Roxane Knetemann (NED); Anna van der Breggen (NED); Annemiek van Vleuten (NED); Marianne Vos (NED)	Boels–Dolmans; Lizzie Armitstead (GBR); Megan Guarnier (USA); Romy Kasper (GER); Christine Majerus (LUX); Katarzyna Pawłowska (POL); Ellen van Dijk (NED)
(Sweden) Open de Suède Vårgårda	24 August	Chantal Blaak (NED)	Amy Pieters (NED)	Roxane Knetemann (NED)
(France) GP de Plouay	30 August	Lucinda Brand (NED)	Marianne Vos (NED)	Pauline Ferrand-Prévot (FRA)
Final standings		Lizzie Armitstead (GBR)	Emma Johansson (SWE)	Marianne Vos (NED)

== Single day races (1.1 and 1.2) ==
Race	Date	Cat. †	Winner	Second	Third
(Belgium) Omloop Het Nieuwsblad	March 1	1.2	Amy Pieters (NED)	Emma Johansson (SWE)	Lizzie Armitstead (GBR)
(Belgium) Le Samyn des Dames	March 5	1.2	Emma Johansson (SWE)	Ashleigh Moolman (RSA)	Sofie De Vuyst (BEL)
(El Salvador) Grand Prix GSB	March 6	1.1	Olga Zabelinskaya (RUS)	Alena Amialiusik (BLR)	Mara Abbott (USA)
(El Salvador) Grand Prix de Oriente	March 7	1.1	Mara Abbott (USA)	Flávia Oliveira (BRA)	Sharon Laws (GBR)
(El Salvador) Grand Prix el Salvador	March 8	1.1	Alena Amialiusik (BLR)	Olga Zabelinskaya (RUS)	Mara Abbott (USA)
(Belgium) Omloop van het Hageland	March 9	1.2	Lizzie Armitstead (GBR)	Emma Johansson (SWE)	Audrey Cordon (FRA)
(Netherlands) Drentse 8	March 13	1.2	Chantal Blaak (NED)	Lucy Garner (GBR)	Lizzie Armitstead (GBR)
(Netherlands) Novilon EDR Cup	March 16	1.2	Kirsten Wild (NED)	Shelley Olds (USA)	Emma Johansson (SWE)
(France) Cholet Pays de Loire Dames	March 23	1.2	Emma Johansson (SWE)	Jolien D'Hoore (BEL)	Elisa Longo Borghini (ITA)
(Italy) GP Comune di Cornaredo	March 23	1.2	Shelley Olds (USA)	Tiffany Cromwell (AUS)	Giorgia Bronzini (ITA)
(Belgium) Gent–Wevelgem	March 30	1.2	Lauren Hall (USA)	Janneke Ensing (NED)	Vera Koedooder (NED)
(Belgium) Grand Prix de Dottignies	April 7	1.2	Giorgia Bronzini (ITA)	Shelley Olds (USA)	Lucy Garner (GBR)
(United States) Winston-Salem Cycling Classic	April 18	1.2	Shelley Olds (USA)	Joëlle Numainville (CAN)	Eugenia Bujak (POL)
(Netherlands) Ronde van Gelderland	April 20	1.2	Kirsten Wild (NED)	Jolien D'Hoore (BEL)	Melissa Hoskins (AUS)
(Netherlands) EPZ Omloop van Borsele (Time Trial)	April 25	1.2	Ellen van Dijk (NED)	Chantal Blaak (NED)	Tayler Wiles (USA)
(Netherlands) EPZ Omloop van Borsele (Road Race)	April 26	1.2	Chloe Hosking (AUS)	Kirsten Wild (NED)	Ellen van Dijk (NED)
(Belgium) Dwars door de Westhoek	April 27	1.1	Anna van der Breggen (NED)	Jolien D'Hoore (BEL)	Lucy Garner (GBR)
(Netherlands) Ronde van Overijssel	May 2	1.1	Lisa Brennauer (GER)	Kirsten Wild (NED)	Nina Kessler (NED)
(Belgium) Trofee Maarten Wynants	May 17	1.2	Maaike Polspoel (BEL)	Amy Cure (AUS)	Liesbet De Vocht (BEL)
(Venezuela) Copa Federación Venezolana de Ciclismo	May 17	1.2	Angie González (VEN)	Ingrid Porras (VEN)	Lilibeth Chacón (VEN)
(Venezuela) Clasico FVCiclismo Corre Por la VIDA	May 18	1.2	Zuralmy Rivas (VEN)	Gleydimar Tapia (VEN)	Angie González (VEN)
(Russia) Grand Prix of Maykop	May 20	1.2	Yulia Ilyinykh (RUS)	Anastasia Chulkova (RUS)	Elena Utrobina (RUS)
(Netherlands) Boels Rental Hills Classic	May 30	1.1	Emma Johansson (SWE)	Ellen van Dijk (NED)	Amy Pieters (NED)
(Netherlands) Rabobank 7-Dorpenomloop Aalburg	May 31	1.2	Marianne Vos (NED)	Lucy Garner (GBR)	Emma Johansson (SWE)
(France) Grand Prix de Plumelec-Morbihan Dames	May 31	1.2	Audrey Cordon (FRA)	Elisa Longo Borghini (ITA)	Charlotte Bravard (FRA)
(United States) The Philadelphia Cycling Classic	June 1	1.1	Evelyn Stevens (USA)	Lex Albrecht (CAN)	Lauren Hall (USA)
(Belgium) Gooik–Geraardsbergen–Gooik	June 1	1.1	Marianne Vos (NED)	Emma Johansson (SWE)	Elisa Longo Borghini (ITA)
(Canada) Chrono Gatineau	June 6	1.1	Tayler Wiles (USA)	Leah Kirchmann (CAN)	Jasmin Glaesser (CAN)
(Slovenia) Nagrada Ljubljane TT	June 6	1.2	Martina Ritter (AUT)	Vera Koedooder (NED)	Taryn Heather (AUS)
(Canada) Grand Prix Cycliste de Gatineau	June 7	1.1	Denise Ramsden (CAN)	Flávia Oliveira (BRA)	Jasmin Glaesser (CAN)
(Spain) Durango-Durango Emakumeen Saria	June 10	1.2	Marianne Vos (NED)	Lizzie Armitstead (GBR)	Emma Johansson (SWE)
(Belgium) Diamond Tour	June 15	1.2	Jolien D'Hoore (BEL)	Beatrice Bartelloni (ITA)	Kelly Druyts (BEL)
(Switzerland) GP du Canton d'Argovie	June 15	1.2	Katarzyna Niewiadoma (POL)	Eugenia Bujak (POL)	Roxane Knetemann (NED)
(Italy) Giro del Trentino Alto Adige-Südtirol	June 21	1.1	Valentina Scandolara (ITA)	Giorgia Bronzini (ITA)	Rossella Ratto (ITA)
(Canada) White Spot / Delta Road Race	July 6	1.2	Leah Kirchmann (CAN)	Samantha Schneider (USA)	Lauren Stephens (USA)
La Course by Le Tour de France	July 27	1.1	Marianne Vos (NED)	Kirsten Wild (NED)	Leah Kirchmann (CAN)
(Belgium) Erondegemse Pijl (Erpe-Mere)	August 2	1.2	Ann-Sophie Duyck (BEL)	Liesbet De Vocht (BEL)	Désirée Ehrler (SUI)
(France) Chrono Champenois-Trophée Européen	September 14	1.1	Hanna Solovey (UKR)	Ellen van Dijk (NED)	Katrin Garfoot (AUS)
(Italy) Giro dell'Emilia Internazionale Donne Elite	October 11	1.2	Rossella Ratto (ITA)	Edwige Pitel (FRA)	Giorgia Bronzini (ITA)
(France) Chrono des Nations	October 19	1.1	Hanna Solovey (UKR)	Alison Tetrick (USA)	Mélodie Lesueur (FRA)

† The clock symbol denotes a race which takes the form of a one-day time trial.

== Stage races (2.1 and 2.2) ==
Race	Date	Cat.	Winner	Second	Third
(Argentina) Tour Femenino de San Luis	January 14–18	2.2	Alison Powers (USA)	Fernanda da Silva (BRA)	Clemilda Fernandes (BRA)
Ladies Tour of Qatar	February 4–7	2.1	Kirsten Wild (NED)	Amy Pieters (NED)	Chloe Hosking (AUS)
Vuelta Internacional Femenina a Costa Rica	February 26 – March 2	2.2	Olga Zabelinskaya (RUS)	Flávia Oliveira (BRA)	Alena Amialiusik (BLR)
Vuelta a El Salvador	March 11–16	2.1	Mara Abbott (USA)	Alena Amialiusik (BLR)	Olga Zabelinskaya (RUS)
(Thailand) The Princess Maha Chackri Sirindhon's Cup	April 8–10	2.2	Zhao Juan Meng (HKG)	Jutatip Maneephan (THA)	Hsiao Mei-yu (TWN)
(Netherlands) Energiewacht Tour	April 9–13	2.2	Lucinda Brand (NED)	Vera Koedooder (NED)	Trixi Worrack (GER)
(Czech Republic) Gracia–Orlová	May 1–4	2.2	Paulina Brzeźna-Bentkowska (POL)	Katrin Garfoot (AUS)	Eugenia Bujak (POL)
(Luxembourg) Festival Luxembourgeois du cyclisme féminin Elsy Jacobs	May 2–4	2.1	Anna van der Breggen (NED)	Marianne Vos (NED)	Shelley Olds (USA)
(United Kingdom) The Women's Tour	May 7–11	2.1	Marianne Vos (NED)	Emma Johansson (SWE)	Rossella Ratto (ITA)
(China) Tour of Chongming Island	May 14–16	2.1	Kirsten Wild (NED)	Shelley Olds (USA)	Giorgia Bronzini (ITA)
(China) Tour of Zhoushan Island	May 21–23	2.2	Charlotte Becker (GER)	Marta Tagliaferro (ITA)	Aizhan Zhaparova (RUS)
(Russia) Tour of Adygeya	May 22–25	2.2	Natalia Boyarskaya (RUS)	Anna Zavershinskaya (RUS)	Tatiana Shamanova (RUS)
(Germany) Auensteiner-Radsporttage	May 31 – June 1	2.2	Lisa Brennauer (GER)	Martina Ritter (AUT)	Trixi Worrack (GER)
(Spain) Emakumeen Euskal Bira	June 12–15	2.1	Pauline Ferrand-Prévot (FRA)	Marianne Vos (NED)	Anna van der Breggen (NED)
(Italy) Giro d'Italia Femminile	July 4–13	2.1	Marianne Vos (NED)	Pauline Ferrand-Prévot (FRA)	Anna van der Breggen (NED)
(Czech Republic) Tour de Feminin-O cenu Českého Švýcarska	July 10–13	2.2	Brianna Walle (USA)	Martina Sáblíková (CZE)	Vera Koedooder (NED)
(Germany) Internationale Thüringen Rundfahrt der Frauen	July 14–20	2.1	Evelyn Stevens (USA)	Lizzie Armitstead (GBR)	Lisa Brennauer (GER)
(France) Tour de Bretagne Féminin	July 16–20	2.2	Elisa Longo Borghini (ITA)	Audrey Cordon (FRA)	Doris Schweizer (SUI)
(Netherlands) BeNe Ladies Tour	July 19–20	2.2	Emma Johansson (SWE)	Jolien D'Hoore (BEL)	Shara Gillow (AUS)
La Route de France	August 10–16	2.1	Claudia Lichtenberg (GER)	Alena Amialiusik (BLR)	Aude Biannic (FRA)
Ladies Tour of Norway	August 15–17	2.2	Anna van der Breggen (NED)	Marianne Vos (NED)	Katarzyna Niewiadoma (POL)
(France) Trophée d'Or Féminin	August 23–27	2.2	Elisa Longo Borghini (ITA)	Elena Berlato (ITA)	Ann-Sophie Duyck (BEL)
(France) Tour Cycliste Féminin International de l'Ardèche	September 1–6	2.2	Linda Villumsen (NZL)	Tayler Wiles (USA)	Edwige Pitel (FRA)
(Netherlands) Boels Rental Ladies Tour	September 2–7	2.1	Evelyn Stevens (USA)	Lisa Brennauer (GER)	Ellen van Dijk (NED)
Lotto Belisol Belgium Tour	September 11–15	2.2	Annemiek van Vleuten (NED)	Anna van der Breggen (NED)	Thalita de Jong (NED)
(Italy) Giro della Toscana Int. Femminile – Memorial Michela Fanini	September 12–14	2.2	Shelley Olds (USA)	Małgorzata Jasińska (POL)	Ewelina Szybiak (POL)

== Cancelled events ==
Race	Date	Cat.
(Italy) Classica Citta di Padova	March 22	1.1
(Italy) GP Liberazione	April 25	1.2
(France) Tour Languedoc Roussillon	May 23–28	2.2
(Netherlands) Ster Zeeuwsche Eilanden	June 19–21	2.2
(Syria) Golan I	June 22	1.2
(Syria) Golan II	June 24	1.2
(Syria) Golan III	June 27	1.2
(France) Tour Féminin en Limousin	July 24–27	2.2
(Brazil) Giro Feminino de Ciclismo	November 7–9	2.2
(Brazil) GP Memorial Bruno Caloi	November 11	1.2
(Brazil) Volta Feminina da República	November 14–16	2.2

== Championships ==
=== International Games ===
Championships	Race	Date	Winner	Second	Third
World University Cycling Championship	Road race	July 10, 2014	(Germany) Kathrin Hammes	(Poland) Katarzyna Solus-Miśkowicz	(Poland) Martyna Klekot
World University Cycling Championship	Individual time trial	July 9, 2014	(Poland) Martyna Klekot	(Germany) Kathrin Hammes	(Germany) Monika Brzeźna
Commonwealth Games	Individual time trial	July 31, 2014	Linda Villumsen (NZL)	Emma Pooley (ENG)	Katrin Garfoot (AUS)
Commonwealth Games	Road race	August 3, 2014	Lizzie Armitstead (ENG)	Emma Pooley (ENG)	Ashleigh Moolman (RSA)
Asian Games	Road race	September 2014	Jutatip Maneephan (THA)	Thi That Nguyen (VIE)	Mei Yu Hsiao (TPE)

=== Continental Championships ===
Championships	Race	Date	Winner	Second	Third
African Cycling Championships	Road race	December 4, 2013	(South Africa) Ashleigh Moolman	(Namibia) Vera Adrian	(Eritrea) Wehazit Kidane
African Cycling Championships	Individual time trial	December 2, 2013	(South Africa) Ashleigh Moolman	(Eritrea) Wehazit Kidane	(Namibia) Vera Adrian
Oceania Cycling Championships	Road race	February 22, 2014	(Australia) Jessica Allen	(Australia) Lisa Keeling	(Australia) Shara Gillow
Oceania Cycling Championships	Individual time trial	February 21, 2014	(Australia) Shara Gillow	(Australia) Felicity Wardlaw	(New Zealand) Reta Trotman
Pan American Championships	Road race	May 10, 2014	(Cuba) Arlenis Sierra	(United States) Megan Guarnier	(Colombia) Laura Lozano
Pan American Championships	Individual time trial	May 8, 2014	(United States) Evelyn Stevens	(Colombia) Sérika Mitchell	(United States) Megan Guarnier
Asian Cycling Championships	Road race	May 31, 2014	(Taiwan) Mei Yu Hsiao	(China) Xiao Juan Diao	(South Korea) Sungeun Gu
Asian Cycling Championships	Individual time trial	May 28, 2014	(South Korea) Reum Ah Na	(Japan) Eri Yonamine	(Mongolia) Tüvshinjargalyn Enkhjargal
European Road Championships	Road race (under-23)	July 12, 2014	(Netherlands) Sabrina Stultiens	(Italy) Elena Cecchini	(France) Annabelle Dreville
European Road Championships	Individual time trial (under-23)	July 10, 2014	(Germany) Mieke Kröger	(France) Séverine Eraud	(Switzerland) Ramona Korchini

== UCI teams ==
The country designation of each team is determined by the country of registration of the largest number of its riders, and is not necessarily the country where the team is registered or based.

The 2014 UCI Women's Teams were:

Code	Official Team Name	Country	Website
ALE	Alé–Cipollini (2014 season)	Italy	alecipolliniteam.com
BPK	Astana BePink Women's Team (2014 season)	Italy	bepink.eu
BCT	Bigla Cycling Team (2014 season)	Switzerland	bigla-cycling-team.ch
BPD	Bizkaia–Durango (2014 season)	Spain	duranguesa.com
GPC	China Chongming–Giant–Champion System Pro Cycling (2014 season)	Hong Kong	
DLT	Boels–Dolmans (2014 season)	Netherlands	boelsdolmanscyclingteam.com
BTC	BTC City Ljubljana (2014 season)	Slovenia	kolesarke.si
EMF	Estado de México–Faren Kuota (2014 season)	Mexico	
FFT	Firefighters Upsala CK (2014 season)	Sweden	uppsalacykelcentrum.com
FDA	Forno d'Asolo–Astute (2014 season)	Lithuania	
FTZ	Futurumshop.nl–Zannata (2014 season)	Netherlands	futurumshop-zannata.com
HPU	Hitec Products (2014 season)	Norway	hitecproducts-uck.no
LKT	Lointek (2014 season)	Spain	equipociclistaugeraga.com
LBL	Lotto–Belisol Ladies (2014 season)	Belgium	lottobelisol.be
NOE	No Radunion Vitalogic (2014 season)	Austria	radteam.sportunion.at
OPW	Optum p/b Kelly Benefit Strategies (2014 season)	United States	optumprocycling.com
GEW	Orica–AIS (2014 season)	Australia	greenedgecycling.com
PHV	Parkhotel Valkenburg Continental Team (2014 season)	Netherlands	parkhotelvalkenburgct.nl
RBW	Rabobank-Liv Woman Cycling Team (2014 season)	Netherlands	raboliv.com
RVL	RusVelo (2014 season)	Russia	rusvelo.pro/en
MIC	S.C. Michela Fanini Rox (2014 season)	Italy	michelafanini.com
SEF	Servetto Footon (2014 season)	Italy	atbike.it
SLU	Specialized–lululemon (2014 season)	United States	velociosports.com
GIW	Team Giant–Shimano (2014 season)	Netherlands	1t4i.com
TRY	Team Rytger (2014 season)	Denmark	team-rytger.dk
TIB	Team TIBCO–To The Top (2014 season)	United States	teamtibco.com
TOG	Top Girls Fassa Bortolo (2014 season)	Italy	gstopgirls.com
VLL	Topsport Vlaanderen–Pro-Duo (2014 season)	Belgium	cyclingteam-damesvlaanderen.be
UHC	UnitedHealthcare Women's Team (2014 season)	United States	velociosports.com
VAI	Vaiano Fondriest (2014 season)	Italy	vcvaiano.com
FUT	Poitou–Charentes.Futuroscope.86 (2014 season)	France	cyclisme-vienne-futuroscope.fr
WHT	Wiggle–Honda (2014 season)	United Kingdom	wigglehonda.com

List updated 30 April 2014.

== See also ==
- 2014 in men's road cycling
