= List of German records in track cycling =

The following are the national records in track cycling in Germany maintained by the Germany's national cycling federation: Bund Deutscher Radfahrer (BDR).

== Men ==
Key to tables: Awaiting ratification Record not kept by Bund Deutscher Radfahrer Not ratified or later rescinded by the Bund Deutscher Radfahrer

Event	Record	Athlete	Date	Meet	Place	Ref
Flying 200m time trial	9.479	Luca Spiegel	7 August 2024	Olympic Games	Saint-Quentin-en-Yvelines, France	
250m time trial (standing start)	16.984 ^{[WB]}	René Enders	5 December 2013	World Cup	Aguascalientes, Mexico	
Flying 500m time trial	25.387	Maximilian Levy	2018		Frankfurt, Germany	
1km time trial	57.949	Maximilian Levy	7 December 2013	World Cup	Aguascalientes, Mexico	
1km time trial (sea level)	59.245	Maximilian Dörnbach	8 August 2023	World Championships	Glasgow, United Kingdom	
Team sprint	41.871	René Enders; Robert Förstemann; Joachim Eilers	5 December 2013	World Cup	Aguascalientes, Mexico	
4000m individual pursuit	4:06.232	Tobias Buck-Gramcko	14 May 2022	Nations Cup	Milton, Canada	
4000m team pursuit	3:45.853	Felix Groß; Benjamin Boos; Max-David Briese; Ben Jochum	2 February 2026	European Championships	Konya, Turkey	
Hour record	51.755 km	Axel Dopfer	18 September 2024		Grenchen, Switzerland	

== Women ==
Event	Record	Athlete	Date	Meet	Place	Ref
Flying 200m time trial	10.010	Lea Friedrich	2 February 2026	European Championships	Konya, Turkey	
250m time trial (standing start)	18.581	Miriam Welte	17 February 2017	World Cup	Cali, Colombia	
Flying 500m time trial	27.063	Emma Hinze	17 August 2024		Berlin, Germany	
500m time trial	32.668	Emma Hinze	13 August 2022	European Championships	Munich, Germany	
500m time trial (sea level)	32.668	Emma Hinze	13 August 2022	European Championships	Munich, Germany	
1 km time trial	1:04.474	Lea Friedrich	25 October 2025	World Championships	Santiago, Chile	
Team sprint (500 m)	31.905	Lea Friedrich; Emma Hinze	2 August 2021	Olympic Games	Izu, Japan	
Team sprint (750 m)	45.377	Pauline Grabosch; Emma Hinze; Lea Friedrich	5 August 2024	Olympic Games	Saint-Quentin-en-Yvelines, France	
3000m individual pursuit	3:17.572	Lisa Brennauer	23 October 2021	World Championships	Roubaix, France	
4000m individual pursuit	4:27.924	Lisa Klein	4 February 2026	European Championships	Konya, Turkey	
3000m team pursuit	3:20.824	Judith Arndt; Charlotte Becker; Lisa Brennauer	4 August 2012	Olympic Games	London, United Kingdom	
4000m team pursuit	4:04.242	Franziska Brauße; Lisa Brennauer; Lisa Klein; Mieke Kröger	3 August 2021	Olympic Games	Izu, Japan	
