= 2019 Madrid Challenge by la Vuelta =

2019 UCI Women's World Tour, race 22 of 23
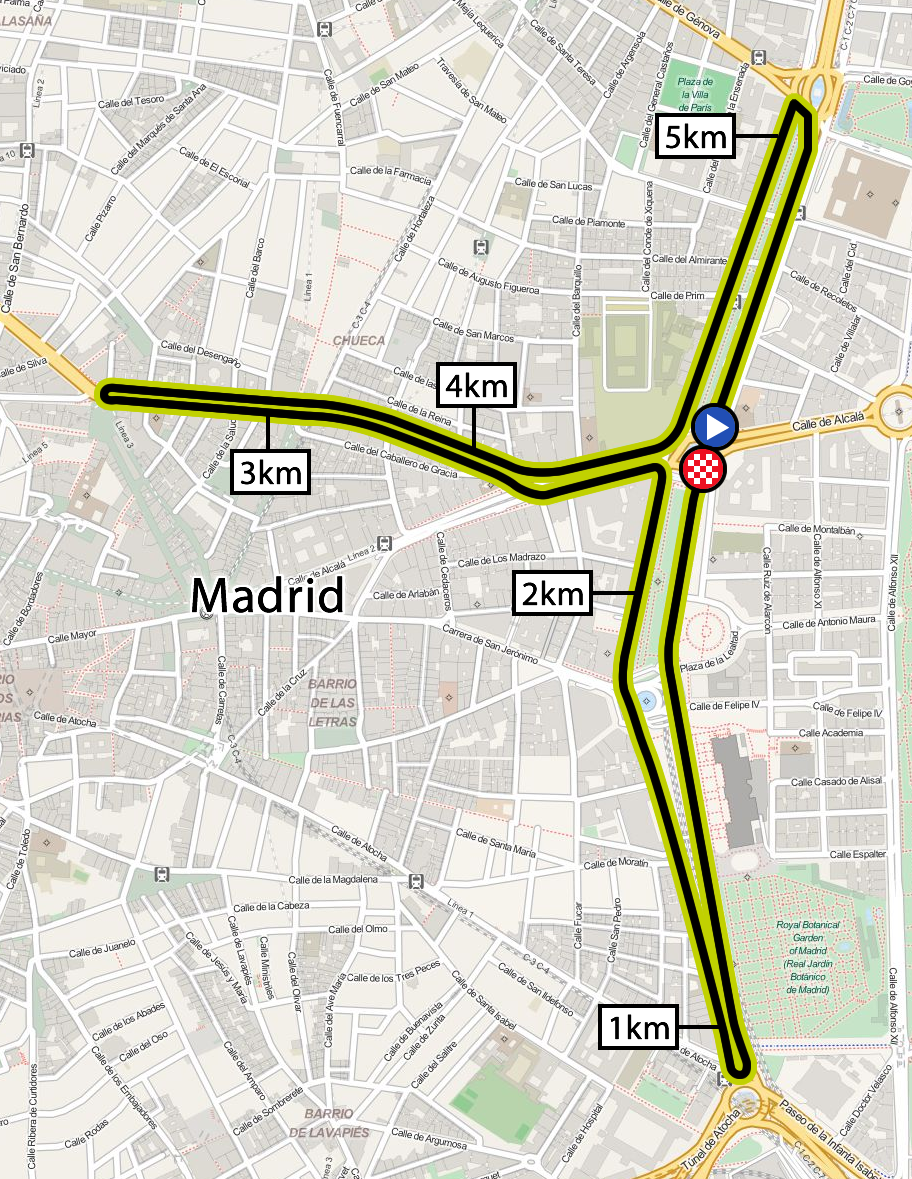
- Course for stage 2 of the 2019 Madrid Challenge

Race details
- Dates: 14–15 September 2019
- Stages: 2
- Distance: 108 km (67 mi)
- Winning time: 2h 33' 06"

Results
Jersey awarded to the overall winner	Winner	Lisa Brennauer (GER)	(WNT–Rotor Pro Cycling)
	Second	Lucinda Brand (NED)	(Team Sunweb)
	Third	Pernille Mathiesen (DEN)	(Team Sunweb)
Jersey awarded to the points classification winner	Points	Lucinda Brand (NED)	(Team Sunweb)
Jersey awarded to the young rider classification winner	Young rider	Pernille Mathiesen (DEN)	(Team Sunweb)

The fifth edition of the Madrid Challenge by La Vuelta, a women's cycling race held in Spain, took place on 14 and 15 September 2019. The event was organised by ASO, which also organises the Vuelta a España. It was the 22nd race of the 2019 UCI Women's World Tour. It was won by Lisa Brennauer of WNT-Rotor Pro Cycling.

== Route and organization ==
The race starts with and 9.3 km individual time trial in Boadilla del Monte, followed by a 98.6 km crit race in Madrid. Stage 2 will use the finishing circuit that will also be used for stage 21 of the 2019 Vuelta.

Stage characteristics and winners
Stage	Date	Course	Distance	Type	Winner
1	14 September	Boadilla del Monte to Boadilla del Monte	9.3 km (5.8 mi)	Individual time trial	Lisa Brennauer (GER)
2	15 September	Madrid to Madrid	98.6 km (61.3 mi)	Flat stage	Chloe Hosking (AUS)
Total		107.9 km (67.0 mi)			

== Results ==
Result
Rank	Rider	Team	Time
1	Lisa Brennauer (GER)	WNT–Rotor Pro Cycling	2h 33' 06"
2	Lucinda Brand (NED)	Team Sunweb	+ 10"
3	Pernille Mathiesen (DEN)	Team Sunweb	+ 28"
4	Christine Majerus (LUX)	Boels–Dolmans	+ 35"
5	Eugenia Bujak (SLO)	BTC City Ljubljana	+ 36"
6	Karol-Ann Canuel (CAN)	Boels–Dolmans	+ 36"
7	Anna Plichta (POL)	Trek–Segafredo	+ 37"
8	Letizia Paternoster (ITA)	Trek–Segafredo	+ 38"
9	Floortje Mackaij (NED)	Team Sunweb	+ 39"
10	Franziska Koch (GER)	Team Sunweb	+ 41"
Source: ProCyclingStats

== Classification leadership table ==
Stage	Winner	General classification	Points classification	Young rider classification	Teams classification
1	Lisa Brennauer	Lisa Brennauer	not awarded	Pernille Mathiesen	Team Sunweb
2	Chloe Hosking	Lisa Brennauer	Lucinda Brand	Pernille Mathiesen	Team Sunweb
Final		Lisa Brennauer	Lucinda Brand	Pernille Mathiesen	Team Sunweb

== See also ==
- 2019 in women's road cycling
