= 2019 Thüringen Rundfahrt der Frauen =

Race details
- Dates: 28 May–2 June
- Stages: 6 stages

The 2019 Thüringen Rundfahrt der Frauen (also known as the Internationalen LOTTO Thüringen Ladies Tour for sponsorship reasons) was the 31st edition of the Thüringen Rundfahrt der Frauen, a women's cycling stage race in Germany. It was rated by the Union Cycliste Internationale as a category 2.1 race and held from 28 May and 2 June 2019.

== Schedule ==
List of stages
Stage	Date	Course	Distance	Type	Winner	Team
1	28 May	Gera to Gera	98.4 km (61.1 mi)	Flat stage	Barbara Guarischi (ITA)	Team Virtu Cycling
2	29 May	Schleiz to Schleiz	113.4 km (70.5 mi)	Flat stage	Marta Bastianelli (ITA)	Team Virtu Cycling
3	30 May	Dörtendorf to Dörtendorf	94 km (58.4 mi)	Flat stage	Vita Heine (NOR)	Hitec Products–Birk Sport
4	31 May	Gotha to Gotha	119.8 km (74.4 mi)	Flat stage	Lisa Klein (GER)	Canyon//SRAM
5	1 June	Meiningen to Meiningen	17.9 km (11.1 mi)	Time Trial	Ellen van Dijk (NED)	Netherlands (National team)
6	2 June	Altenburg to Altenburg	102.2 km (63.5 mi)	Flat stage	Elena Cecchini (ITA)	Canyon//SRAM

== Classification leadership table ==
Stage	Winner	General classification	Mountains classification	Sprints classification	Young rider classification	Best German rider classification	Active rider classification	Best amateur rider classification	Team classification
1	Barbara Guarischi	Barbara Guarischi	Beate Zanner	Kathrin Hammes	Pernille Mathiesen	Kathrin Hammes	Kathrin Hammes	Beate Zanner	Canyon//SRAM
2	Marta Bastianelli	Kathrin Hammes	Kathrin Hammes	Kathrin Hammes	Pernille Mathiesen	Franziska Koch	Alice Barnes	Franziska Koch	Team Sunweb
3	Vita Heine	Kathrin Hammes	Pauliena Rooijakkers	Barbara Guarischi	Pernille Mathiesen	Liane Lippert	Marieke van Witzenburg	Yara Kastelijn	Team Sunweb
4	Lisa Klein	Kathrin Hammes	Pauliena Rooijakkers	Lisa Klein	Pernille Mathiesen	Lisa Klein	Marta Lach	Niamh Fisher-Black	Team Sunweb
5	Ellen van Dijk	Kathrin Hammes	Pauliena Rooijakkers	Lisa Klein	Pernille Mathiesen	Lisa Brennauer	Marta Lach	Franziska Koch	Team Sunweb
6	Elena Cecchini	Kathrin Hammes	Pauliena Rooijakkers	Barbara Guarischi	Pernille Mathiesen	Romy Kasper	Liane Lippert	Franziska Koch	Team Sunweb
Final		Kathrin Hammes	Pauliena Rooijakkers	Barbara Guarischi	Pernille Mathiesen	Romy Kasper	Liane Lippert	Franziska Koch	Team Sunweb

== See also ==
- Thüringen Rundfahrt der Frauen
- 2019 in women's road cycling
