= 2014 World University Cycling Championship – Women's road race =

Women's Road Race
2014 World University Cycling Championship

Race details
- Dates: 10 July 2014
- Stages: 1
- Distance: 66 km (41 mi)
- Winning time: 1h 59' 59"

Medalists
	Gold	Kathrin Hammes (GER)
	Silver	Katarzyna Solus-Miśkowicz (POL)
	Bronze	Martyna Klekot (POL)

The women's road race at the 2014 World University Cycling Championship took place in Jelenia Góra, Poland on 10 July 2014. The race was 66 km long. 32 riders from 12 countries registered for the race. One rider did not start and two riders did not finish.

After finishing second in the time trial the day before, Kathrin Hammes won the road race. Katarzyna Solus-Miśkowicz finished second and time trial winner Martyna Klekot took bronze.

== Top-10 final classification ==
Rank	Rider	Time	Behind
1st place, gold medalist(s)	Kathrin Hammes (GER)	1h 59' 59"	—N/a
2nd place, silver medalist(s)	Katarzyna Solus-Miśkowicz (POL)	2h 00' 54"	+ 55"
3rd place, bronze medalist(s)	Martyna Klekot (POL)	2h 02' 47"	+ 2' 48"
4	Paulina Cywinska (POL)	2h 03' 23"	+ 3' 24"
5	Nicole Hanselmann (SUI)	2h 03' 24"	+ 3' 25"
6	Barbara Denkó (HUN)	2h 03' 24"	+ 3' 25"
7	Yumiko Goda (JPN)	2h 03' 25"	+ 3' 25"
8	Monika Brzeźna (POL)	2h 03' 26"	+ 3' 27"
9	Lubica Dadova (SVK)	2h 04' 52"	+ 4' 52"
10	Shoko Kashiki (JPN)	2h 05' 39"	+ 5' 40"
