= Petr Vakoč =

Czech professional cyclist

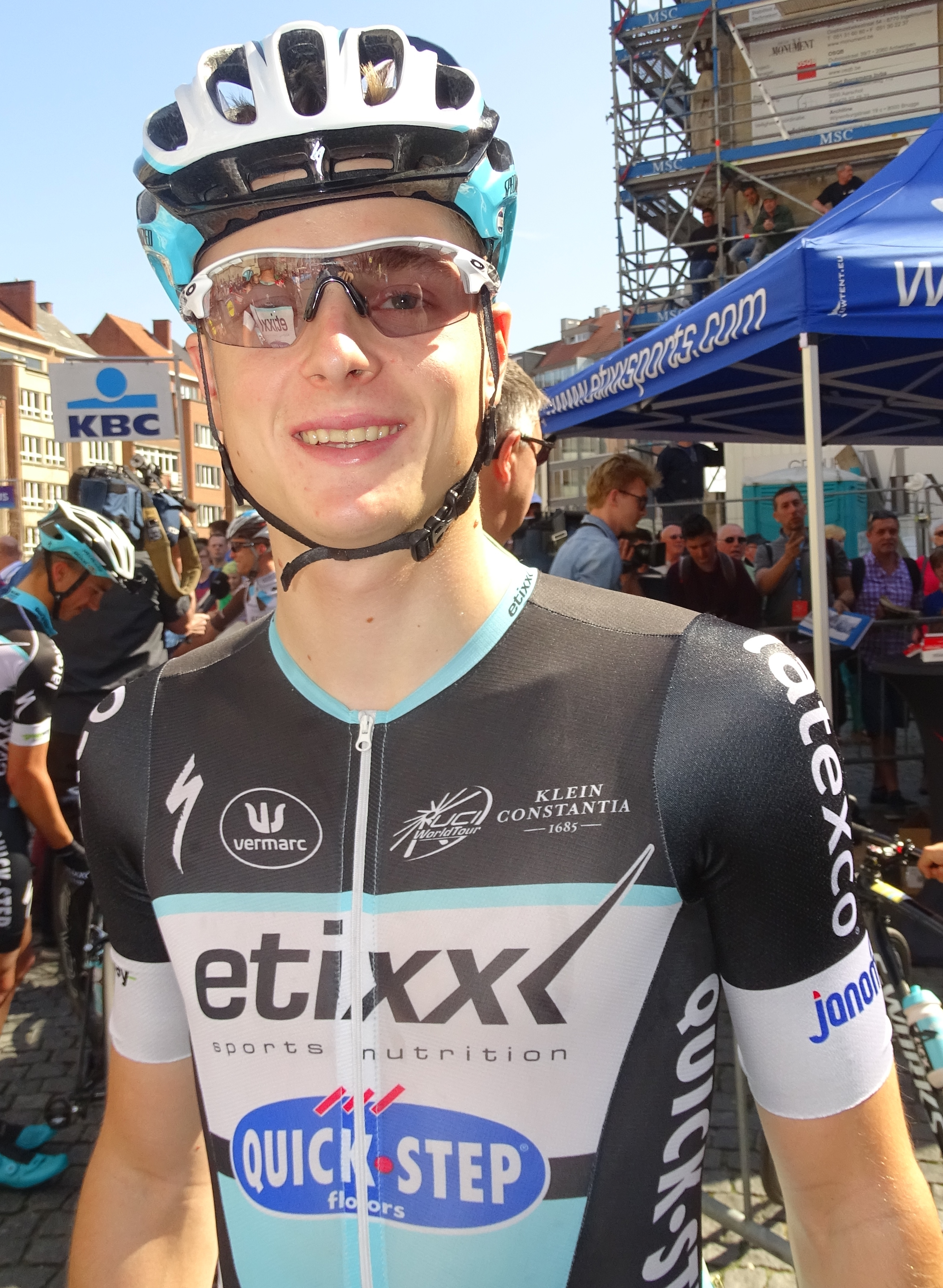
- Vakoč at the 2015 Brabantse Pijl

Personal information
- Full name: Petr Vakoč
- Nickname: Vaki
- Born: 11 July 1992 (age 34) Prague, Czechoslovakia
- Height: 1.79 m (5 ft 10 in)
- Weight: 68 kg (150 lb)

Cycling career
- Sport: Cycling
- Disciplines: Road; Gravel; Mountain biking
- Role: Rider
- Rider type: All-rounder

Amateur teams
- 2011: ASC Dukla Praha
- 2011: Centre Mondial du Cyclisme
- 2012: CC Etupes

Professional teams
- 2013: Etixx–IHNed
- 2014–2019: Omega Pharma–Quick-Step
- 2020–2021: Alpecin–Fenix
- 2022–2023: Canyon Northwave

Major wins
- One-day races and Classics National Road Race Championships (2015) Brabantse Pijl (2016)
Medal record
Men's road cycling
Representing the Czech Republic
European Games
Bronze medal – third place	2015 Baku	Road race
World University Cycling Championship
Gold medal – first place	2014 Jelenia Góra	Road race
Gold medal – first place	2014 Jelenia Góra	Time trial
European Championships
Silver medal – second place	2013 Olomouc	Under-23 road race

Petr Vakoč (born 11 July 1992) is a Czech cyclist, who currently competes in gravel racing.

== Career ==
=== 2013 ===
2013 was Prague-born Vakoč's first year as a professional, riding for Etixx–IHNed, the development team of Omega Pharma–Quick-Step. In June, he won the Okolo Slovenska stage race at the age of 20. His success continued when with ann overall victory in the Vuelta a la Comunidad de Madrid sub-23, the under-23 version of the Vuelta a la Comunidad de Madrid. In August Vakoč won the 1.2 event Grand Prix Královéhradeckého kraje, five seconds ahead of Josef Hosek.

=== 2014 ===
After Vakoč's successes in 2013, he was offered a contract with Omega Pharma–Quick-Step. He finished 10th overall and won a stage at the Tour de Pologne, a UCI World Tour event. He also placed second in both the Czech National Road Race and Time Trial Championships.

=== 2015 ===
In 2015, Vakoč won the Czech National Road Race Championships, finished 11 seconds ahead of Leopold König. In May, he rode his first Grand Tour, the Giro d'Italia, finishing 116th overall. Later that year, he claimed victory in the Czech Cycling Tour, one of his country's most prominent races, and also won a stage of the Tour of Britain. Representing the Czech Republic at the European Games, Vakoč earned a bronze medal in the road race.

=== 2016 ===
Vakoč found success in one-day races during his fourth professional season, winning three notable events. He claimed victory at both the Classic Sud-Ardèche and La Drôme Classic on consecutive days in February. In April, he secured the biggest win of his career at the Brabantse Pijl, a 1.HC race in Belgium. However, would prove to be his final professional victory. He was later named in the start list for the 2016 Tour de France.

=== Injury and recovery ===
In January 2018, Vakoč and his teammate Laurens De Plus were injured during a training camp in South Africa when they were struck by a truck. Vakoč sustained multiple broken vertebrae, requiring spinal surgery and a lengthy recovery that included relearning how to walk. After spending the remainder of 2018 recuperating, he returned to competition at the 2019 Vuelta a San Juan.

=== Alpecin–Fenix ===
Vakoč joined Alpecin–Fenix for the 2020 season. He rode for the team in the 2021 Tour de France. In October 2021, he announced his retirement from professional road cycling at the age of 29, following the Giro del Veneto that month. In February 2022, it was announced that Vakoč would join the UCI Mountain Bike Team Canyon Northwave to compete in marathon mountain bike races.

== Major results ==
=== Gravel ===
2023
UCI World Series

1st Świeradów-Zdrój
1st Berja

2nd Unbound Gravel 200
2nd SBT GRVL
6th European Championships
2024
UCI World Series

1st La Monsterrato
2nd Suisse
2nd Champéry
3rd Gatehouse of Fleet
3rd Hegau
3rd Girona

1st Overall Santa Vall

1st Prologue

1st The Traka 200
3rd Belgian Waffle Ride California
3rd MČR Gravel
2025
UCI World Series

1st Gatehouse of Fleet

2nd Overall Sahara Gravel

1st Stage 4

2nd Overall Santa Vall
2nd La Bescanonina
4th Sea Otter Classic
4th The Hills

=== Mountain bike ===
2022
UCI Marathon Series

2nd Jelenia Góra

5th Marathon, UEC European Championships

=== Road ===
2010
2nd Overall Tour du Pays de Vaud

1st Stage 3

3rd Road race, National Junior Championships
3rd Overall Course de la Paix Juniors
5th Brno–Velká Bíteš–Brno
2011
1st Time trial, National Under-23 Championships
2013
1st Overall Okolo Slovenska

1st Young rider classification

1st Overall Vuelta a la Comunidad de Madrid Sub-23

1st Points classification
1st Stage 1

1st Grand Prix Královéhradeckého kraje
2nd Road race, UEC European Under-23 Championships
2nd Memorial Van Coningsloo
3rd Time trial, National Under-23 Championships
4th Overall Czech Cycling Tour

1st Points classification
1st Stage 4

4th Memorial Jana Veselého
2014 (1 pro win)
World University Championships

1st Road race
1st Time trial

National Championships

2nd Road race
2nd Time trial

5th Trofeo Serra de Tramuntana
10th Overall Tour de Pologne

1st Stage 2

2015 (3)
National Championships

1st Road race
3rd Time trial

1st Overall Czech Cycling Tour

1st Stage 1 (TTT)

1st Stage 2 Tour of Britain
3rd Road race, European Games
7th Overall Tour du Poitou-Charentes

1st Young rider classification

2016 (3)
1st Brabantse Pijl
1st Classic Sud-Ardèche
1st La Drôme Classic
2nd Overall Tour La Provence

1st Young rider classification

2nd Grand Prix de Wallonie
National Championships

3rd Time trial
4th Road race

5th Road race, UEC European Championships
5th Overall Tour du Haut Var

1st Young rider classification

5th Strade Bianche
9th Grand Prix Cycliste de Québec
2017
National Championships

2nd Time trial
3rd Road race

2nd Brabantse Pijl
6th Cadel Evans Great Ocean Road Race
7th Grand Prix Cycliste de Québec
8th Binche–Chimay–Binche
10th Overall BinckBank Tour
2019
National Championships

3rd Road race
3rd Time trial

2020
3rd Road race, National Championships
6th Paris–Tours
9th Overall Czech Cycling Tour
9th Overall Tour de Luxembourg
2021
10th La Drôme Classic

==== Grand Tour general classification results timeline ====
Grand Tour	2015	2016	2017	2018	2019	2020	2021
Giro d'Italia	116	—	—	—	—	—	—
Tour de France	—	118	—	—	—	—	118
Vuelta a España	Did not contest during his career						

==== Classics results timeline ====
Monument	2014	2015	2016	2017	2018	2019	2020	2021
Milan–San Remo	—	—	—	—	—	—	—	132
Tour of Flanders	—	—	—	—	—	—	70	—
Paris–Roubaix	Did not contest during his career							
Liège–Bastogne–Liège	—	73	DNF	148	—	94	39	—
Giro di Lombardia	—	53	53	—	—	DNF	52	DNF
Classic	2014	2015	2016	2017	2018	2019	2020	2021
Strade Bianche	—	—	5	27	—	60	DNF	15
Brabantse Pijl	34	61	1	2	—	27	39	DNF
La Flèche Wallonne	—	122	107	126	—	87	41	—
Grand Prix Cycliste de Québec	32	—	9	7	—	—	Not held	
Grand Prix Cycliste de Montréal	13	—	52	13	—	—	Not held	
Paris–Tours	—	—	—	—	—	—	6	—

Legend
—	Did not compete
DNF	Did not finish
