= 2017 Holland Ladies Tour =

2017 Boels Rental Ladies Tour
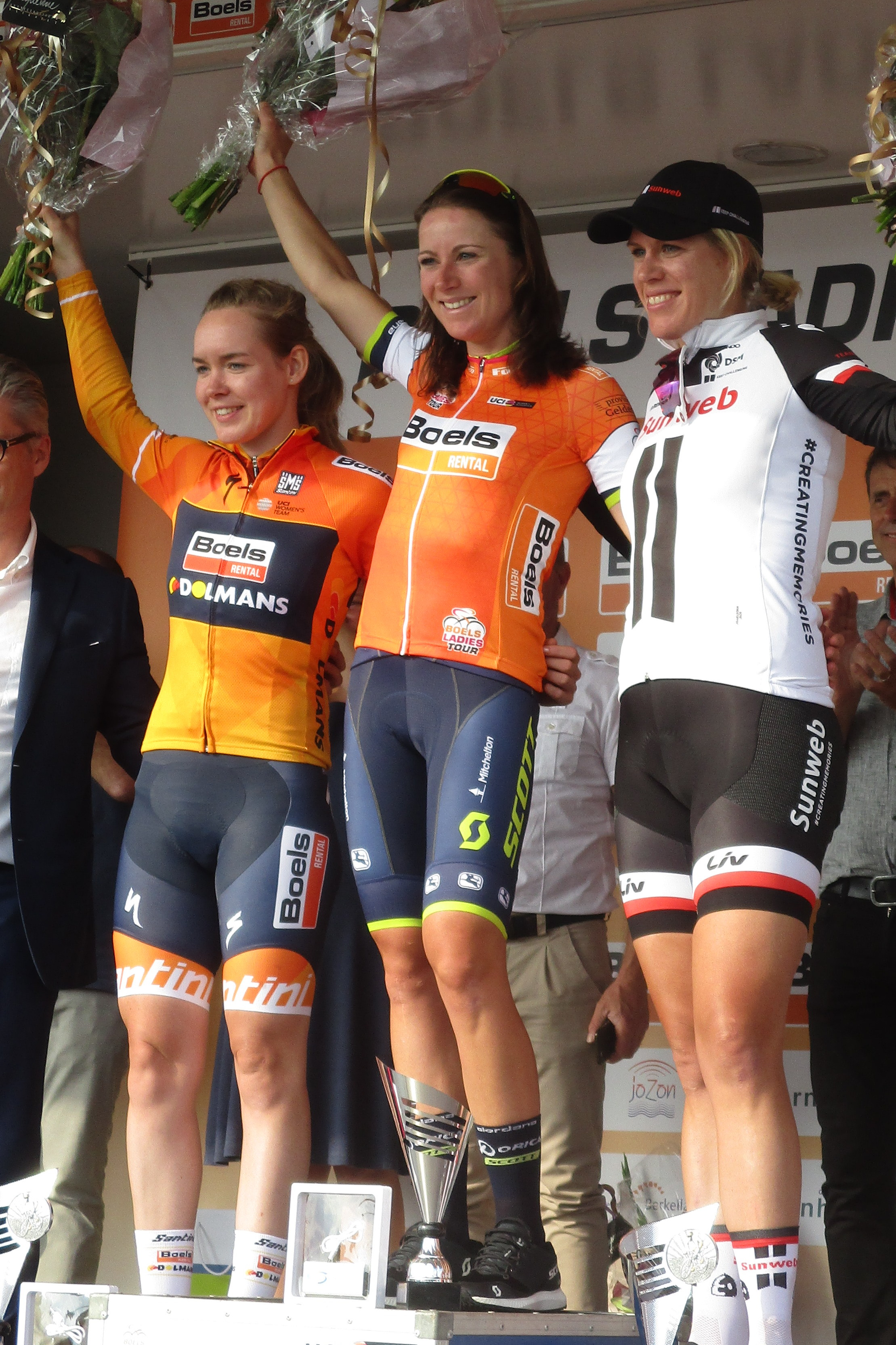
- 2017 Boels Ladies Tour 6e etappe

Race details
- Stages: 5 + Prologue

Results
Jersey awarded to the overall winner	Winner	Annemiek van Vleuten (NED)	(Orica–Scott)
	Second	Anna van der Breggen (NED)	(Boels–Dolmans)
	Third	Ellen van Dijk (NED)	(Team Sunweb)
Jersey awarded to the points classification winner	Points	Lisa Brennauer (GER)	(Canyon//SRAM)
Jersey awarded to the mountains classification winner	Mountains	Alexis Ryan (USA)	(Canyon//SRAM)
Jersey awarded to the youth classification winner	Youth	Demi de Jong (NED)	(Boels–Dolmans)
Jersey awarded to the sprints classification winner	Sprints	Winanda Spoor (NED)	(Lensworld–Kuota)
	Team	Boels–Dolmans	

The 2017 Boels Rental Ladies Tour also known as the 2017 Holland Ladies Tour is the 20th edition of the Holland Ladies Tour, a women's cycle stage race held in the Netherlands. The tour is part of the 2017 women's road cycling calendar and is part of the UCI Women's World Tour.

== Stages ==
List of stages
Stage	Date	Course	Distance	Type	Winner
P	29 August	Wageningen to Wageningen	4.3 km (2.7 mi)	Prologue	Annemiek van Vleuten (NED)
2	30 August	Eibergen to Arnhem	132.8 km (82.5 mi)	Flat stage	Kirsten Wild (NED)
3	31 August	Roosendaal to Roosendaal	16.9 km (10.5 mi)	Time Trial	Annemiek van Vleuten (NED)
4	1 September	Gennep to Weert	121.4 km (75.4 mi)	Flat stage	Lisa Brennauer (GER)
5	2 September	Stramproy to Vaals	137.5 km (85.4 mi)	Flat stage	Anna van der Breggen (NED)
6	3 September	Sittard to Sittard	157.1 km (97.6 mi)	Flat stage	Janneke Ensing (NED)
Total			570 km (354.2 mi)		

=== Prologue ===
29 August 2017 — Wageningen to Wageningen, 4.3 km (2.7 mi), individual time trial (ITT)

Prologue result & General classification after Prologue
Rank	Rider	Team	Time
1	Annemiek van Vleuten (NED)	Orica–Scott	5' 47"
2	Ellen Van Dijk (NED)	Team Sunweb	+ 5"
3	Lisa Brennauer (GER)	Canyon//SRAM	+ 11"
4	Anna van der Breggen (NED)	Boels–Dolmans	+ 15"
5	Trixi Worrack (GER)	Canyon//SRAM	+ 18"
6	Amy Pieters (NED)	Boels–Dolmans	+ 19"
7	Chantal Blaak (NED)	Boels–Dolmans	+ 19"
8	Mieke Kröger (GER)	Canyon//SRAM	+ 19"
9	Lizzie Deignan (GBR)	Boels–Dolmans	+ 20"
10	Lucinda Brand (NED)	Team Sunweb	+ 23"

=== Stage 2 ===
30 August 2017 — Eibergen to Arnhem, 132.8 km (82.5 mi)

Result
Rank	Rider	Team	Time
1	Kirsten Wild (NED)	Cylance Pro Cycling	3h 18' 48"
2	Maria Giulia Confalonieri (ITA)	Lensworld–Kuota	s.t.
3	Lisa Brennauer (GER)	Canyon//SRAM	s.t.
4	Amy Pieters (NED)	Boels–Dolmans	s.t.
5	Ellen Van Dijk (NED)	Team Sunweb	s.t.
6	Sheyla Gutiérrez (ESP)	Cylance Pro Cycling	s.t.
7	Claudia Koster (NED)	Team VéloCONCEPT	s.t.
8	Jessy Druyts (BEL)	Sport Vlaanderen–Guill D'or	s.t.
9	Jeanne Korevaar (NED)	WM3 Energie	s.t.
10	Roxane Fournier (FRA)	FDJ Nouvelle-Aquitaine Futuroscope	s.t.

General classification after Stage 2
Rank	Rider	Team	Time
1	Annemiek van Vleuten (NED)	Orica–Scott	3h 24' 25"
2	Ellen Van Dijk (NED)	Team Sunweb	+ 5"
3	Lisa Brennauer (GER)	Canyon//SRAM	+ 7"
4	Anna van der Breggen (NED)	Boels–Dolmans	+ 15"
5	Trixi Worrack (GER)	Canyon//SRAM	+ 18"
6	Kirsten Wild (NED)	Cylance Pro Cycling	+ 18"
7	Amy Pieters (NED)	Boels–Dolmans	+ 19"
8	Chantal Blaak (NED)	Boels–Dolmans	+ 19"
9	Mieke Kröger (GER)	Canyon//SRAM	+ 19"
10	Lizzie Deignan (GBR)	Boels–Dolmans	+ 20"

=== Stage 3 ===
31 August 2017 — Roosendaal to Roosendaal, 16.9 km (10.5 mi)

Stage 3
Rank	Rider	Team	Time
1	Annemiek van Vleuten (NED)	Orica–Scott	22' 12"
2	Ellen Van Dijk (NED)	Team Sunweb	+ 4"
3	Linda Villumsen (NZL)	Team VéloCONCEPT	+ 26"
4	Anna van der Breggen (NED)	Boels–Dolmans	+ 32"
5	Lisa Brennauer (GER)	Canyon//SRAM	+ 33"
6	Mieke Kröger (GER)	Canyon//SRAM	+ 37"
7	Ann-Sophie Duyck (BEL)	Belgium (National Team)	+ 38"
8	Chantal Blaak (NED)	Boels–Dolmans	+ 42"
9	Tayler Wiles (USA)	United States (National Team)	+ 57"
10	Elisa Longo Borghini (ITA)	Wiggle High5	+ 57"

General classification after Stage 3
Rank	Rider	Team	Time
1	Annemiek van Vleuten (NED)	Orica–Scott	3h 46' 47"
2	Ellen Van Dijk (NED)	Team Sunweb	+ 9"
3	Lisa Brennauer (GER)	Canyon//SRAM	+ 40"
4	Anna van der Breggen (NED)	Boels–Dolmans	+ 47"
5	Linda Villumsen (NZL)	Team VéloCONCEPT	+ 55"
6	Mieke Kröger (GER)	Canyon//SRAM	+ 56"
7	Chantal Blaak (NED)	Boels–Dolmans	+ 1' 01"
8	Ann-Sophie Duyck (BEL)	Belgium (National Team)	+ 1' 02"
9	Trixi Worrack (GER)	Canyon//SRAM	+ 1' 19"
10	Tayler Wiles (USA)	United States (National Team)	+ 1' 23"

=== Stage 4 ===
1 September 2017 — Gennep to Weert, 121.4 km (75.4 mi)

Stage 4
Rank	Rider	Team	Time
1	Lisa Brennauer (GER)	Canyon//SRAM	2h 57' 42"
2	Chloe Hosking (AUS)	Alé–Cipollini	s.t.
3	Roxane Fournier (FRA)	FDJ Nouvelle-Aquitaine Futuroscope	s.t.
4	Kirsten Wild (NED)	Cylance Pro Cycling	s.t.
5	Marta Bastianelli (ITA)	Alé–Cipollini	s.t.
6	Christine Majerus (LUX)	Boels–Dolmans	s.t.
7	Maria Giulia Confalonieri (ITA)	Lensworld–Kuota	s.t.
8	Gracie Elvin (AUS)	Orica–Scott	s.t.
9	Annemiek van Vleuten (NED)	Orica–Scott	s.t.
10	Trixi Worrack (GER)	Canyon//SRAM	s.t.

General classification after Stage 4
Rank	Rider	Team	Time
1	Annemiek van Vleuten (NED)	Orica–Scott	6h 44' 29"
2	Ellen Van Dijk (NED)	Team Sunweb	+ 9"
3	Lisa Brennauer (GER)	Canyon//SRAM	+ 30"
4	Anna van der Breggen (NED)	Boels–Dolmans	+ 47"
5	Linda Villumsen (NZL)	Team VéloCONCEPT	+ 55"
6	Chantal Blaak (NED)	Boels–Dolmans	+ 1' 01"
7	Mieke Kröger (GER)	Canyon//SRAM	+ 1' 04"
8	Ann-Sophie Duyck (BEL)	Belgium (National Team)	+ 1' 10"
9	Trixi Worrack (GER)	Canyon//SRAM	+ 1' 19"
10	Amy Pieters (NED)	Boels–Dolmans	+ 1' 29"

== Classification leadership ==
Stage	Winner	General classification	Points classification	Mountain classification	Sprint classification	Young rider classification	Combativity classification	Team classification
P	Annemiek van Vleuten	Annemiek van Vleuten	Annemiek van Vleuten	Lisa Brennauer	Trixi Worrack	Floortje Mackaij	Amy Pieters	Canyon//SRAM
2	Kirsten Wild	Annemiek van Vleuten	Ellen van Dijk	Nathalie van Gogh	Winanda Spoor	Floortje Mackaij	Eri Yonamine	Canyon//SRAM
3	Annemiek van Vleuten	Annemiek van Vleuten	Ellen van Dijk	Nathalie van Gogh	Winanda Spoor	Karlijn Swinkels	Eri Yonamine	Canyon//SRAM
4	Lisa Brennauer	Annemiek van Vleuten	Lisa Brennauer	Nathalie van Gogh	Winanda Spoor	Karlijn Swinkels	Pernille Mathiesen	Canyon//SRAM
5	Anna van der Breggen	Annemiek van Vleuten	Annemiek van Vleuten	Anouska Koster	Winanda Spoor	Demi de Jong	Alexis Ryan	Boels–Dolmans
6	Janneke Ensing	Annemiek van Vleuten	Lisa Brennauer	Alexis Ryan	Winanda Spoor	Demi de Jong	Katarzyna Niewiadoma	Boels–Dolmans
Final Classification		Annemiek van Vleuten	Lisa Brennauer	Alexis Ryan	Winanda Spoor	Demi de Jong	No overall	Boels–Dolmans

== See also ==
- 2017 in women's road cycling
