= 2015 Holland Ladies Tour =

2015 Boels Rental Ladies Tour
Race details
- Dates: 1–6 September 2015
- Stages: 6

The 2015 Boels Rental Ladies Tour also known as the 2015 Holland Ladies Tour is the 18th edition of the Holland Ladies Tour, a women's cycle stage race in the Netherlands. The tour is part of the 2014 women's road cycling calendar and was held 1 September to 6 September. The tour has six stages, including an individual time trial. The tour starts with the first stages in and around Tiel and concludes with a hilly stage in Limburg. The tour has an UCI rating of 2.1.

== Preview ==
The favorites for the overall title are Ellen van Dijk (Boels-Dolmans), Amy Pieters (Liv-Plantur), Lucinda Brand (Rabo-Liv) and Lisa Brennauer (Velocio-SRAM). For Ellen van Dijk (who won the Tour in 2013) it his her first race after she broke her collarbone in the 2015 La Course by Le Tour de France. She had a speedy recovery and went to a high altitude training, but it is unknown what her shape is.

For the sprint stages the most important sprinters will be: Kirsten Wild (Hitec), Jolien D'hoore (Wiggle-Honda) and Lucy Garner (Liv-Plantur).

== Stages ==
Legend
Yellow jersey	Denotes the leader of the General classification	Green jersey	Denotes the leader of the Points classification
White jersey	Denotes the leader of the Sprint classification		Denotes the leader of the Young rider classification
Mountains jersey	Denotes the leader of the Mountains classification		Denotes the Combative rider

=== Stage 1 ===
1 September – Zeddam to 's-Heerenberg, 110.9 km (68.9 mi)

Stage 1 result
Rank	Rider	Team	Time
1	Jolien D'Hoore (BEL)	Wiggle–Honda	2h 39' 23"
2	Lucy Garner (GBR)	Team Liv–Plantur	s.t.
3	Lucinda Brand (NED)	Rabo–Liv	s.t.
4	Trixi Worrack (GER)	Velocio–SRAM	s.t.
5	Christine Majerus (LUX)	Boels–Dolmans	s.t.
6	Amy Pieters (NED)	Team Liv–Plantur	s.t.
7	Carmen Small (USA)	Bigla Pro Cycling Team	s.t.
8	Thalita de Jong (NED)	Rabo–Liv	s.t.
9	Lizzie Williams (AUS)	Orica–GreenEDGE	s.t.
10	Demi de Jong (NED)	Boels–Dolmans	s.t.

General classification after Stage 1
Rank	Rider	Team	Time
1	Jolien D'Hoore (BEL)	Wiggle–Honda	2h 39' 13"
2	Lucy Garner (GBR)	Team Liv–Plantur	+ 4"
3	Amy Pieters (NED)	Team Liv–Plantur	+ 4"
4	Lucinda Brand (NED)	Rabo–Liv	+ 5"
5	Thalita de Jong (NED)	Rabo–Liv	+ 8"
6	Christine Majerus (LUX)	Boels–Dolmans	+ 9"
7	Trixi Worrack (GER)	Velocio–SRAM	+ 10"
8	Carmen Small (USA)	Bigla Pro Cycling Team	+ 10"
9	Lizzie Williams (AUS)	Orica–GreenEDGE	+ 10"
10	Demi de Jong (NED)	Boels–Dolmans	+ 10"

=== Stage 2 ===
2 September – Tiel to Tiel, 103.9 km (64.6 mi)

Stage 2 result
Rank	Rider	Team	Time
1	Jolien D'Hoore (BEL)	Wiggle–Honda	2h 34' 41"
2	Lucinda Brand (NED)	Rabo–Liv	s.t.
3	Christine Majerus (LUX)	Boels–Dolmans	s.t.
4	Trixi Worrack (GER)	Velocio–SRAM	s.t.
5	Lucy Garner (GBR)	Team Liv–Plantur	s.t.
6	Marta Bastianelli (ITA)	Italy national team	s.t.
7	Elena Cecchini (ITA)	Italy national team	s.t.
8	Amy Pieters (NED)	Team Liv–Plantur	s.t.
9	Coryn Rivera (USA)	United States national team	s.t.
10	Thalita de Jong (NED)	Rabo–Liv	s.t.

General classification after stage 2
Rank	Rider	Team	Time
1	Jolien D'Hoore (BEL)	Wiggle–Honda	5h 13' 24"
2	Lucinda Brand (NED)	Rabo–Liv	+ 8"
3	Amy Pieters (NED)	Team Liv–Plantur	+ 10"
4	Lucy Garner (GBR)	Team Liv–Plantur	+ 16"
5	Christine Majerus (LUX)	Boels–Dolmans	+ 17"
6	Thalita de Jong (NED)	Rabo–Liv	+ 20"
7	Trixi Worrack (GER)	Velocio–SRAM	+ 22"
8	Lizzie Williams (AUS)	Orica–GreenEDGE	+ 22"
9	Kirsten Wild (NED)	Team Hitec Products	+ 22"
10	Carmen Small (USA)	Bigla Pro Cycling Team	+ 22"

=== Stage 3 ===
3 September – Tiel to Tiel, 106.7 km (66.3 mi)

Stage 3 result
Rank	Rider	Team	Time
1	Lauren Hall (USA)	United States national team	2h 42' 08"
2	Marta Bastianelli (ITA)	Italy national team	s.t.
3	Kirsten Wild (NED)	Team Hitec Products	+ 2"
4	Lucinda Brand (NED)	Rabo–Liv	+ 2"
5	Christine Majerus (LUX)	Boels–Dolmans	+ 2"
6	Jolien D'Hoore (BEL)	Wiggle–Honda	+ 2"
7	Lucy Garner (GBR)	Team Liv–Plantur	+ 2"
8	Barbara Guarischi (ITA)	Velocio–SRAM	+ 2"
9	Maria Giulia Confalonieri (ITA)	Italy national team	+ 2"
10	Coryn Rivera (USA)	United States national team	+ 2"

General classification after stage 3
Rank	Rider	Team	Time
1	Marta Bastianelli (ITA)	Italy national team	7h 56' 07"
2	Lauren Hall (USA)	United States national team	+ 1"
3	Jolien D'Hoore (BEL)	Wiggle–Honda	+ 5"
4	Lucinda Brand (NED)	Rabo–Liv	+ 12"
5	Amy Pieters (NED)	Team Liv–Plantur	+ 15"
6	Lucy Garner (GBR)	Team Liv–Plantur	+ 21"
7	Christine Majerus (LUX)	Boels–Dolmans	+ 22"
8	Kirsten Wild (NED)	Team Hitec Products	+ 23"
9	Thalita de Jong (NED)	Rabo–Liv	+ 25"
10	Lizzie Williams (AUS)	Orica–GreenEDGE	+ 27"

=== Stage 4 ===
4 September – Oosterhout to Oosterhout, (Individual time trial) 11.4 km (7.1 mi)

German Time Trial World Champion Lisa Brennauer (Velocio-SRAM) won the time trial, two seconds ahead of Ellen van Dijk (Boels-Dolmans). During the time trial it started raining after Brennauer and Van Dijk were finished, which was a disadvantage for the riders finishing later. Brennauer was very happy winning in het world champion rainbow jersey. Van Dijk, who won the time trial previous year and the 2013 World Time Trial Champion broke her collarbone at the 2015 La Course by Le Tour de France. She was also happy with her result and gave her confidence that she was well recovered. With winning the time trial Brennauer also took the lead in the general classification.

Stage 4 result
Rank	Rider	Team	Time
1	Lisa Brennauer (GER)	Velocio–SRAM	+ 14' 38"
2	Ellen van Dijk (NED)	Boels–Dolmans	+ 2"
3	Trixi Worrack (GER)	Velocio–SRAM	+ 15"
4	Lucinda Brand (NED)	Rabo–Liv	+ 22"
5	Alena Amialiusik (BLR)	Velocio–SRAM	+ 25"
6	Katrin Garfoot (AUS)	Orica–GreenEDGE	+ 27"
7	Karol-Ann Canuel (CAN)	Velocio–SRAM	+ 28"
8	Annemiek van Vleuten (NED)	Bigla Pro Cycling Team	+ 28"
9	Thalita de Jong (NED)	Rabo–Liv	+ 29"
10	Elisa Longo Borghini (ITA)	Wiggle–Honda	+ 29"

General classification after stage 4
Rank	Rider	Team	Time
1	Lisa Brennauer (GER)	Velocio–SRAM	+ 8h 11' 18"
2	Lucinda Brand (NED)	Rabo–Liv	+ 1"
3	Ellen van Dijk (NED)	Boels–Dolmans	+ 2"
4	Trixi Worrack (GER)	Velocio–SRAM	+ 9"
5	Thalita de Jong (NED)	Rabo–Liv	+ 21"
6	Alena Amialiusik (BLR)	Velocio–SRAM	+ 25"
7	Jolien D'Hoore (BEL)	Wiggle–Honda	+ 25"
8	Elisa Longo Borghini (ITA)	Wiggle–Honda	+ 29"
9	Megan Guarnier (USA)	Boels–Dolmans	+ 32"
10	Karol-Ann Canuel (CAN)	Velocio–SRAM	+ 33"

=== Stage 5 ===
5 September – Gennep to Gennep, 126.2 km (78.4 mi)

Stage 5 result
Rank	Rider	Team	Time
1	Lisa Brennauer (GER)	Velocio–SRAM	3h 09' 45"
2	Kirsten Wild (NED)	Team Hitec Products	s.t.
3	Jolien D'Hoore (BEL)	Wiggle–Honda	s.t.
4	Amy Pieters (NED)	Team Liv–Plantur	s.t.
5	Christine Majerus (LUX)	Boels–Dolmans	s.t.
6	Lucinda Brand (NED)	Rabo–Liv	s.t.
7	Thalita de Jong (NED)	Rabo–Liv	s.t.
8	Lucy Garner (GBR)	Team Liv–Plantur	s.t.
9	Jip van den Bos (NED)	Parkhotel Valkenburg Continental Team	s.t.
10	Lizzie Williams (AUS)	Orica–GreenEDGE	+ 3"

General classification after stage 5
Rank	Rider	Team	Time
1	Lisa Brennauer (GER)	Velocio–SRAM	+ 11h 20' 53"
2	Lucinda Brand (NED)	Rabo–Liv	+ 8"
3	Ellen van Dijk (NED)	Boels–Dolmans	+ 15"
4	Trixi Worrack (GER)	Velocio–SRAM	+ 22"
5	Thalita de Jong (NED)	Rabo–Liv	+ 30"
6	Jolien D'Hoore (BEL)	Wiggle–Honda	+ 31"
7	Elisa Longo Borghini (ITA)	Wiggle–Honda	+ 42"
8	Amy Pieters (NED)	Team Liv–Plantur	+ 44"
9	Megan Guarnier (USA)	Boels–Dolmans	+ 45"
10	Alena Amialiusik (BLR)	Velocio–SRAM	+ 46"

=== Stage 6 ===
6 September – Bunde to Valkenburg, 117.5 km (73.0 mi)

Stage 6 result
Rank	Rider	Team	Time
1	Thalita de Jong (NED)	Rabo–Liv	3h 08' 36"
2	Elisa Longo Borghini (ITA)	Wiggle–Honda	+ 1"
3	Lisa Brennauer (GER)	Velocio–SRAM	s.t.
4	Lucinda Brand (NED)	Rabo–Liv	+ 2"
5	Ellen van Dijk (NED)	Boels–Dolmans	s.t.
6	Megan Guarnier (USA)	Boels–Dolmans	s.t.
7	Roxane Knetemann (NED)	Rabo–Liv	+ 5"
8	Amy Pieters (NED)	Team Liv–Plantur	s.t.
9	Claudia Lichtenberg (GER)	Team Liv–Plantur	s.t.
10	Amanda Spratt (AUS)	Orica–GreenEDGE	+ 27"

General classification after stage 5
Rank	Rider	Team	Time
1	Lisa Brennauer (GER)	Velocio–SRAM	+ 14h 29' 26"
2	Lucinda Brand (NED)	Rabo–Liv	+ 13"
3	Ellen van Dijk (NED)	Boels–Dolmans	+ 20"
4	Thalita de Jong (NED)	Rabo–Liv	+ 23"
5	Elisa Longo Borghini (ITA)	Wiggle–Honda	+ 40"
6	Megan Guarnier (USA)	Boels–Dolmans	+ 49"
7	Amy Pieters (NED)	Team Liv–Plantur	+ 52"
8	Roxane Knetemann (NED)	Rabo–Liv	+ 1' 10"
9	Trixi Worrack (GER)	Velocio–SRAM	+ 1' 27"
10	Annemiek van Vleuten (NED)	Bigla Pro Cycling Team	+ 1' 36"

== See also ==
- 2015 in women's road cycling
