= Katarzyna Solus-Miśkowicz =

Polish cyclist

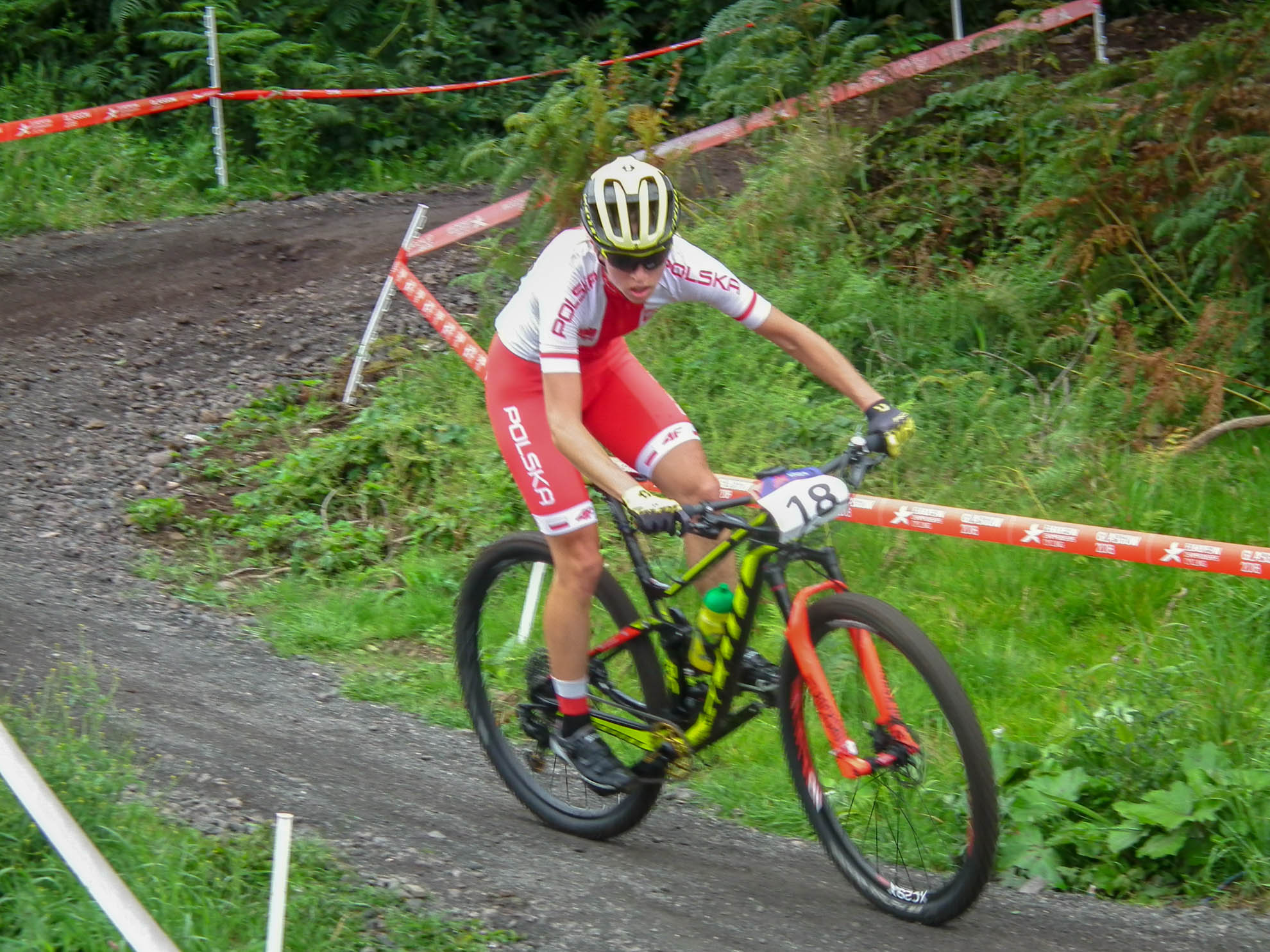

Personal information
- Born: 21 March 1988 (age 38) Zakopane, Poland

Cycling career
- Sport: Cycling
- Discipline: Mountain biking

Katarzyna Solus-Miśkowicz (born 21 March 1988) is a mountain biker and road racing cyclist from Poland. She represented her nation at the 2010 UCI Mountain Bike & Trials World Championships – Women's cross-country in the under-23 category. At the 2014 World University Cycling Championship she won both mountain bike disciplines, the mass start and time trial and won the silver medal in the road race. She was on the start list of 2018 Cross-Country European Championships and finished 25.
