= 2021 UCI Track Cycling World Championships – Women's individual pursuit =

Women's individual pursuit at the 2021 UCI Track Cycling World Championships
- Venue: Vélodrome Couvert Régional Jean Stablinski
- Location: Roubaix, France
- Dates: 23 October
- Competitors: 18 from 13 nations
- Winning time: 3:18.258

Medalists
gold medal	Lisa Brennauer	Germany
silver medal	Franziska Brauße	Germany
bronze medal	Mieke Kröger	Germany

The Women's individual pursuit competition at the 2021 UCI Track Cycling World Championships was held on 23 October 2021.

== Results ==
=== Qualifying ===
The Qualifying was started at 13:25. The two fasters riders will race for gold and the third and fourth fastest riders will race for bronze.

Rank	Name	Nation	Time	Behind	Notes
1	Lisa Brennauer	Germany	3:17.572		Q
2	Franziska Brauße	Germany	3:22.292	+4.720	Q
3	Mieke Kröger	Germany	3:22.336	+4.764	q
4	Martina Alzini	Italy	3:26.328	+8.756	q
5	Marion Borras	France	3:26.856	+9.284	
6	Kelly Murphy	Ireland	3:27.490	+9.918	
7	Lily Williams	United States	3:30.386	+12.814	
8	Mia Griffin	Ireland	3:34.713	+17.141	
9	Megan Barker	Great Britain	3:35.175	+17.603	
10	Ella Barnwell	Great Britain	3:35.539	+17.967	
11	Fabienne Buri	Switzerland	3:35.889	+18.317	
12	Aksana Salauyeva	Belarus	3:36.744	+19.172	
13	Viktoriia Yaroshenko	Ukraine	3:37.134	+19.562	
14	Tania Calvo	Spain	3:38.003	+20.431	
15	Lina Hernández	Colombia	3:40.261	+22.689	
16	Jessica Parra	Colombia	3:41.837	+24.265	
17	Luo Yiwei	Singapore	3:44.992	+27.420	
18	Ese Ukpeseraye	Nigeria	4:14.774	+57.202	

=== Finals ===
The finals were started at 19:41.

Rank	Name	Nation	Time	Behind
Gold medal race
1st place, gold medalist(s)	Lisa Brennauer	Germany	3:18.258	
2nd place, silver medalist(s)	Franziska Brauße	Germany	3:22.980	+4.732
Bronze medal race
3rd place, bronze medalist(s)	Mieke Kröger	Germany		
4	Martina Alzini	Italy	OVL	
