= Martyna Klekot =

Polish cyclist (born 1988)

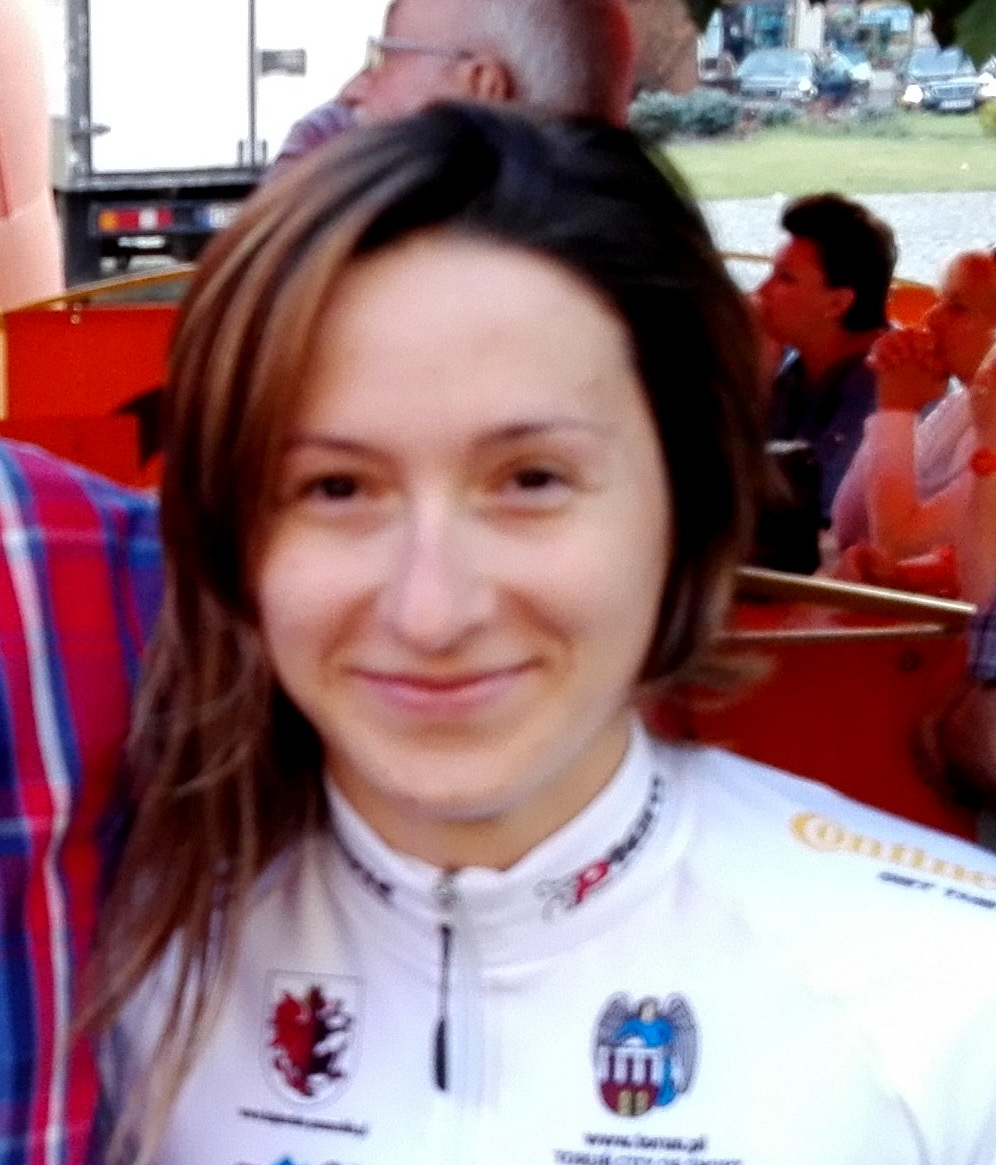
- Klekot in Prudnik, 2016

Personal information
- Born: 1 July 1988 (age 38) Blachownia, Poland

Cycling career
- Sport: Cycling
- Current team: TKK Pacific Nestle Toruń Fitness
- Discipline: Road cycling

Professional teams
- 2000–2015: Kolejarz Jura Częstochowa
- 2016–: TKK Pacific Nestle Toruń Fitness
Medal record
Women's road cycling
Representing Poland
World University Cycling Championship
Bronze medal – third place	2014 Jelenia Góra	Road race

Martyna Klekot (born 1 July 1988 in Blachownia) is a road cyclist from Poland. She participated at the 2012 UCI Road World Championships. She won the bronze medal at the 2014 World University Cycling Championship in the road race.
