= Kathrin Hammes =

German road bicycle racer (born 1989)

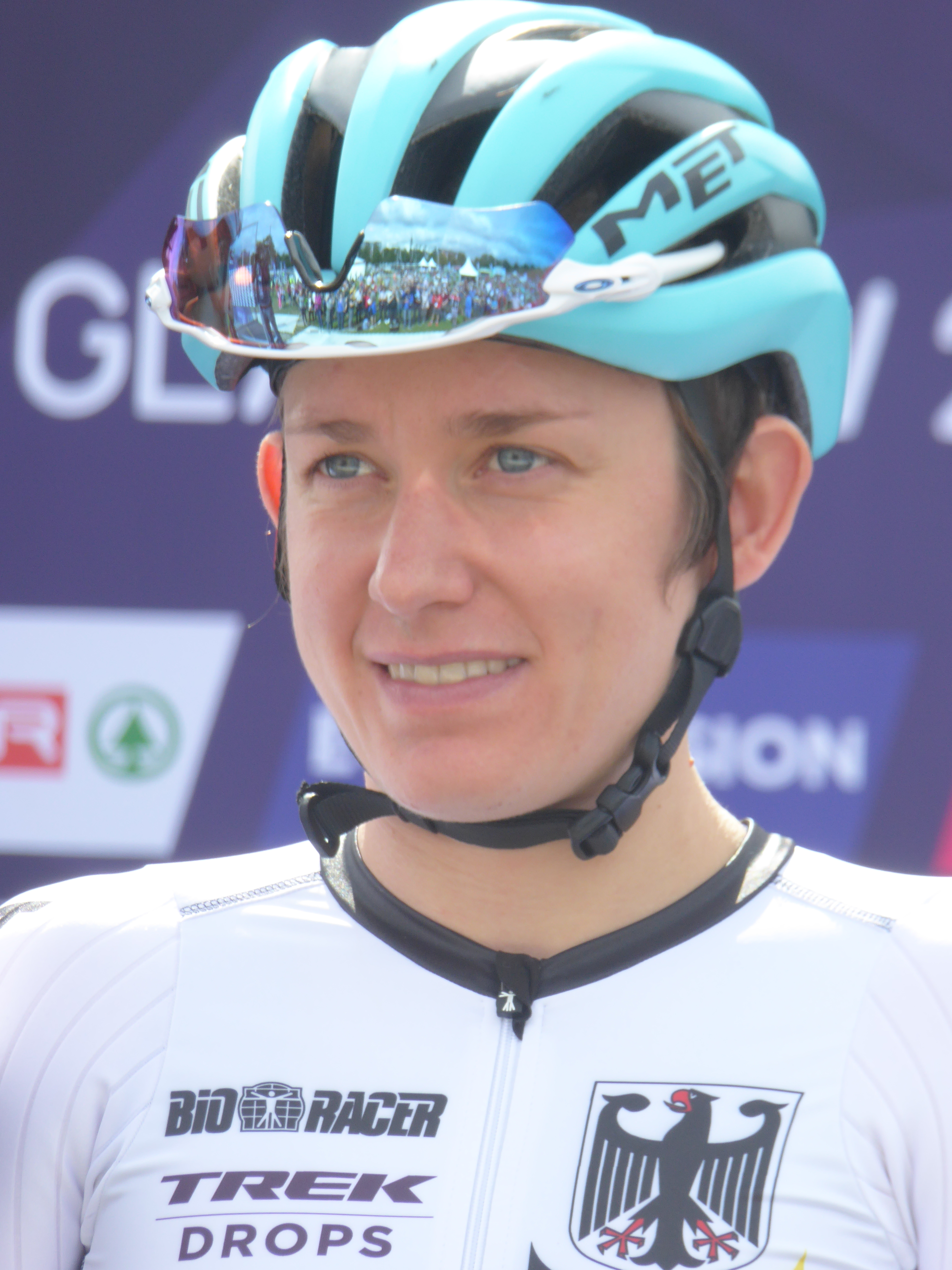
- Hammes at the 2018 European Road Cycling Championships.

Personal information
- Full name: Kathrin Hammes
- Born: 9 January 1989 (age 37): Cologne, West Germany

Cycling career
- Sport: Cycling
- Discipline: Road
- Role: Rider
- Rider type: Climber

Amateur teams
- 2008–2012: Team Rothaus Vita Classica
- 2013–2014: Racing Students

Professional teams
- 2015–2017: Team TIBCO–SVB
- 2018: Trek–Drops
- 2019–2021: WNT–Rotor Pro Cycling
- 2022–2023: EF Education–Tibco–SVB
Medal record
Women's road cycling
Representing Germany
World University Cycling Championship
Gold medal – first place	2014 Jelenia Góra	Road race
Silver medal – second place	2014 Jelenia Góra	Time trial

Kathrin Hammes (born 9 January 1989 in Cologne) is a German former professional road bicycle racer.

She won the gold medal at the 2014 World University Cycling Championship in the road race and the silver medal in the time trial. She represented her country at the 2011 Summer Universiade where she finished 14th in the road race. She also participated in the under-23 road race at the 2011 European Road Championships.

Hammes studies at the University of Freiburg as of 2014.

== Major results ==
2014
World University Cycling Championship

1st Road race
2nd Time trial

1st Stage 7 Tour de l'Ardèche
2019
1st Overall Thüringen Ladies Tour
2021
1st Mountains classification, Thüringen Ladies Tour
