= 2014 World University Cycling Championship =

- Venue: Jelenia Góra, Poland
- Date: 9–13 July 2014
- Events: 8

The 2014 World University Cycling Championship is the 6th World University Cycling Championship (5th according to the organisation) sponsored by the International University Sports Federation (FISU) and sanctioned by the Union Cycliste Internationale (UCI). The championship will take place in Jelenia Góra, Poland from 9 to 13 July 2014.

== Participation ==
Each country may enter a maximum of twenty competitors with limited number of competitors per event. For road cycling there is a maximum of 4 men and 4 women per discipline and for the mountainbike events a maximum of six 6 men and 6 women per discipline per country.

== Schedule ==
Wednesday, 9 July 2014

- Road cycling: women's time trial, 23 km
- Road cycling: men's time trial, 23 km

Thursday, 10 July 2014

- Road cycling: women's road race, 66 km
- Road cycling: men's road race, 94 km

Saturday, 12 July 2014

- Mountainbike: women's time trial, 4 km
- Mountainbike: men's time trial, 4 km

Sunday 13 July 2014

- Mountainbike: women's mass start, 18 km
- Mountainbike: men's mass start, 26 km

== Events summary ==
=== Road Cycling ===
Event	Gold		Silver		Bronze	
Men's events
Road Race details	Petr Vakoč; Czech Republic	2h 30' 33"	Tim Gebauer; Germany	+ 1' 09"	Emanuel Piaskowy; Poland	+ 1' 09"
Time trial details	Petr Vakoč; Czech Republic	33' 30.98"	Tim Gebauer; Germany	+ 6"	Adrian Kurek; Poland	+ 14"
Women's events
Road Race	Kathrin Hammes; Germany	1h 59' 59"	Katarzyna Solus-Miśkowicz; Poland	+ 55"	Martyna Klekot; Poland	+ 2' 48"
Time trial details	Martyna Klekot; Poland	38' 19.98"	Kathrin Hammes; Germany	+ 24"	Monika Brzeźna; Poland	+ 37"

=== Mountainbiking ===
Event	Gold		Silver		Bronze	
Men's events
Mass start details	Emilien Barben; Switzerland	1h 23' 06"	Marek Konwa; Poland	+ 44"	Jan Nesvadba; Czech Republic	+ 1' 18"
Time trial details	Marek Konwa; Poland	11' 56.40"	Jan Nesvadba; Czech Republic	+ 8.52"	Emilien Barben; Switzerland	+ 19.93"
Women's events
Mass start details	Katarzyna Solus-Miśkowicz; Poland	1h 09' 45"	Barbara Benkó; Hungary	+ 2' 20"	Marine Groccia; Switzerland	+ 4' 36"
Time trial details	Katarzyna Solus-Miśkowicz; Poland	15' 08.81"	Barbara Benkó; Hungary	+ 22.65"	Marine Groccia; Switzerland	+ 49.94"

== Medal table ==
Rank	Nation	Gold	Silver	Bronze	Total
1	Poland (POL)	4	2	4	10
2	Czech Republic (CZE)	2	1	1	4
3	Germany (GER)	1	3	0	4
4	Switzerland (SUI)	1	0	3	4
5	Hungary (HUN)	0	2	0	2
Totals (5 entries)		8	8	8	24
