= Lisa Brennauer =

German cyclist (born 1988)

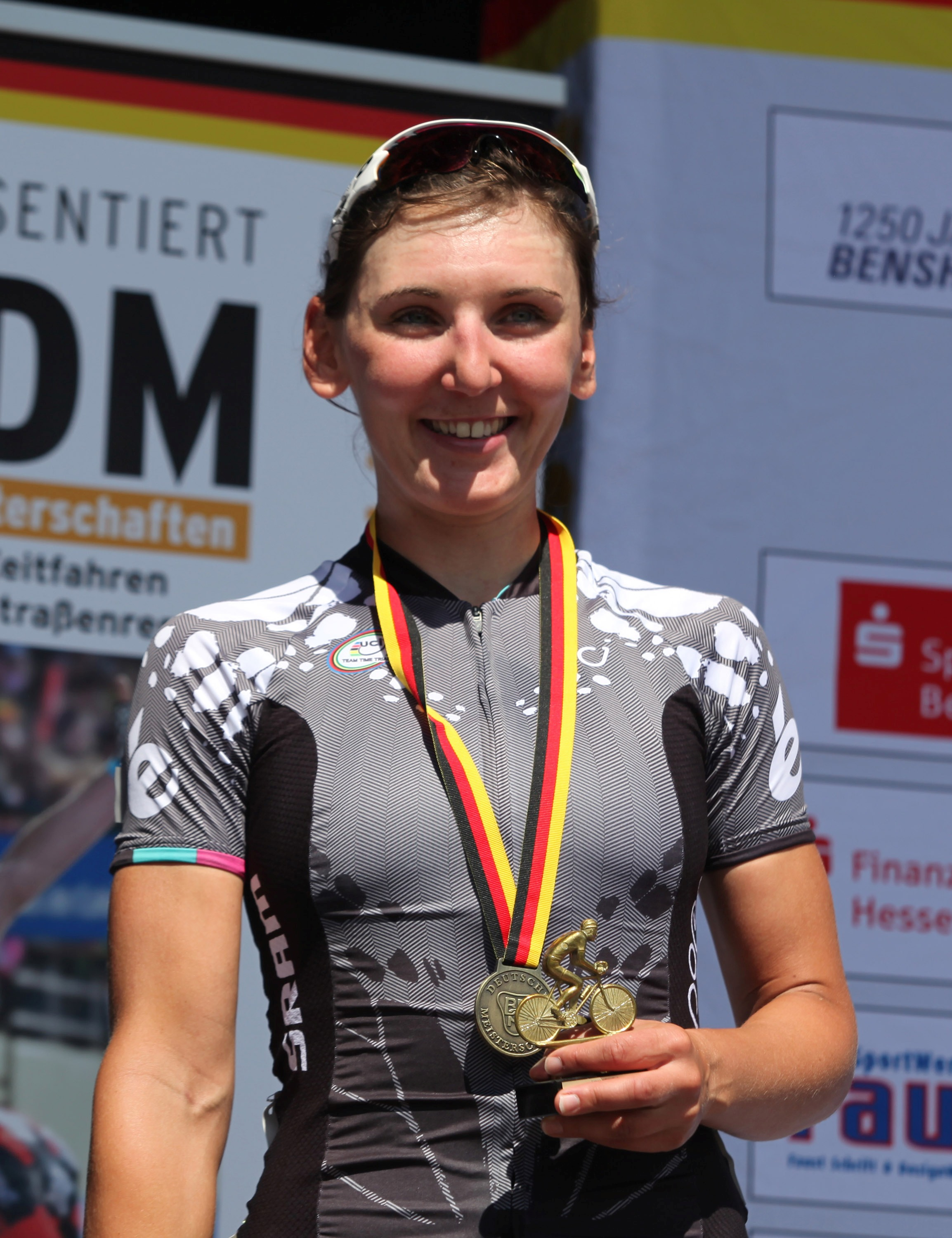
- Brennauer in 2015

Personal information
- Born: 8 June 1988 (age 38) Kempten, West Germany
- Height: 1.68 m (5 ft 6 in)
- Weight: 63 kg (139 lb)

Cycling career
- Sport: Cycling
- Disciplines: Road; Track
- Role: Rider
- Rider type: Time trialist

Amateur team
- 2008: Team Stuttgart

Professional teams
- 2009: Equipe Nürnberger Versicherung
- 2010–2011: Hitec Products UCK
- 2012–2015: Velocio–SRAM
- 2016–2017: Canyon//SRAM
- 2018: Wiggle High5
- 2019–2022: WNT–Rotor Pro Cycling

Major wins
- Stage races The Women's Tour (2015) Holland Ladies Tour (2015) Thüringen Rundfahrt der Frauen (2017, 2018) Challenge by La Vuelta (2019, 2020) Grand Prix Elsy Jacobs (2019) One day races & classics Olympic Games Track Championships – Team Pursuit (2020) World Team Time Trial Championships (2013, 2014, 2015) World Time Trial Championships (2014) World Mixed Relay Championships (2021) World Track Championships – Individual pursuit (2021) World Track Championships – Team pursuit (2021) National Time Trial Championships (2013, 2014, 2018, 2021, 2022) National Road Race Championships (2014, 2019–2021) Open de Suède Vårgårda TTT (2013, 2014)
Medal record
Representing Germany
Women's road cycling
World Championships
Gold medal – first place	2014 Ponferrada	Time trial
Gold medal – first place	2021 Flanders	Mixed team relay
Silver medal – second place	2014 Ponferrada	Road race
Silver medal – second place	2019 Yorkshire	Mixed team relay
Bronze medal – third place	2015 Richmond	Time trial
European Championships
Gold medal – first place	2020 Plouay	Mixed team relay
Silver medal – second place	2019 Alkmaar	Mixed team relay
Bronze medal – third place	2018 Glasgow	Road race
Bronze medal – third place	2021 Trentino	Time trial
Women's track cycling
Olympic Games
Gold medal – first place	2020 Tokyo	Team pursuit
World Championships
Gold medal – first place	2021 Roubaix	Team pursuit
Gold medal – first place	2021 Roubaix	Individual pursuit
Silver medal – second place	2019 Pruszków	Individual pursuit
Silver medal – second place	2020 Berlin	Individual pursuit
Bronze medal – third place	2020 Berlin	Team pursuit
European Championships
Gold medal – first place	2018 Glasgow	Individual pursuit
Gold medal – first place	2021 Grenchen	Individual pursuit
Gold medal – first place	2021 Grenchen	Team pursuit
Gold medal – first place	2022 Munich	Team pursuit
Silver medal – second place	2011 Apeldoorn	Team pursuit
Silver medal – second place	2019 Apeldoorn	Individual pursuit
Silver medal – second place	2019 Apeldoorn	Team pursuit
Silver medal – second place	2022 Munich	Individual pursuit
Bronze medal – third place	2010 Pruszkow	Team pursuit
Bronze medal – third place	2018 Glasgow	Team pursuit
Representing Velocio–SRAM
Women's road cycling
World Championships
Gold medal – first place	2013 Florence	Team time trial
Gold medal – first place	2014 Ponferrada	Team time trial
Gold medal – first place	2015 Richmond	Team time trial
Representing Canyon//SRAM
Women's road cycling
World Championships
Silver medal – second place	2016 Doha	Team time trial

Lisa Brennauer (born 8 June 1988) is a German former racing cyclist, who rode professionally between 2009 and 2022, for six different teams.

On the track, Brennauer won the gold medal at the 2020 Summer Olympics in the women's team pursuit with Mieke Kröger, Lisa Klein and Franziska Brauße, setting the new world record. She also won two gold medals at the 2021 UCI Track Cycling World Championships, and four gold medals over three different UEC European Track Championships. On the road, Brennauer formed part of three consecutive team time trial world championship victories between 2013 and 2015, and also won world titles in the individual time trial in 2014, and the mixed team relay in 2021. Brennauer also won nine national road titles during her career – five in the time trial and four in the road race – as well as several stage races such as The Women's Tour, the Holland Ladies Tour, the Grand Prix Elsy Jacobs, the Thüringen Rundfahrt der Frauen (twice) and the Challenge by La Vuelta (twice).

== Major results ==
=== Road ===
2005
1st Time trial, UCI Junior World Championships
2007
1st Weitnau Criterium
1st Duracher-Abend-Kriterium
1st Buchloer Citykriterium
2nd Rosenheimer Frucade-Straßenpreis
2nd Allgäuer Festwochenpreis Kempten
3rd Köln-Schuld-Frechen
2008
1st Duracher Straßenpreis
1st Grand Prix Allgäu
1st Günzach Criterium
2nd Preis der Stadtsparkasse Schrobenhausen
3rd Pinswanger Straßenrennen
3rd Rund um den Elm
3rd Allgäuer Festwochenpreis Kempten
UEC European Under-23 Road Championships

4th Road race
9th Time trial

2009
Bavaria State Road Championships

1st Road race
2nd Time trial

1st Aichacher-Frühjahrsstraßenpreis
2nd Overall Albstadt-Frauen-Etappenrennen

1st Stage 2

2nd Berner Rundfahrt
3rd Pinswanger Straßenrennen
3rd Großer Silber Pils Preis
2011
1st Eidsvollrittet Race 2
1st Betten Lima Kriterium
3rd Ronde van Goor
2012
3rd Overall Belgium Tour
2013
1st Team time trial, UCI Road World Championships
1st Time trial, National Road Championships
1st Open de Suède Vårgårda TTT
1st Stage 2 (TTT) Holland Ladies Tour
2nd Overall Belgium Tour

1st Stage 1 (TTT)

3rd Overall Internationale Thüringen Rundfahrt der Frauen
4th Overall Energiewacht Tour
4th Chrono Champenois – Trophée Européen
7th Overall Gracia-Orlová
7th Ronde van Gelderland
8th Overall Ladies Tour of Qatar
8th Overall Tour Languedoc Roussillon

1st Stage 5 (ITT)

2014
1st UCI Road World Championships – Women's time trial
1st UCI Road World Championships – Women's team time trial
2nd UCI Road World Championships – Women's road race
National Road Championships

1st Time trial
1st Road race

1st Overall Auensteiner-Radsporttage

1st Stages 1 (ITT) & 2

1st Ronde van Overijssel
1st Grand Prix Leende
Open de Suède Vårgårda

1st Team time trial
6th Road race

2nd Overall Holland Ladies Tour

1st Points classification
1st Stage 2

3rd Overall Internationale Thüringen Rundfahrt der Frauen

1st German rider classification
1st Prologue & Stage 3 (ITT)

4th La Course by Le Tour de France
5th Overall Energiewacht Tour

1st Stage 3b (TTT)

5th Sparkassen Giro
10th Novilon EDR Cup
2015
1st Team time trial
1st Overall Energiewacht Tour

1st Stage 2a (TTT)

1st Overall The Women's Tour

1st Points classification
1st Stage 4

1st Overall Holland Ladies Tour

1st Stages 4 (ITT) & 5

National Road Championships

2nd Time trial
3rd Road race

Open de Suède Vårgårda

2nd Team time trial
3rd Road race

2nd Time trial, EPZ Omloop van Borsele
3rd UCI Road World Championships – Women's time trial
3rd Diamond Tour
5th Overall Thüringen Rundfahrt

1st German rider classification
1st Stages 1 & 3a (ITT)

6th La Course by Le Tour de France
10th Overall Gracia–Orlová

1st Stage 3 (ITT)

2016
2nd UCI Road World Championships – Women's team time trial
National Road Championships

2nd Road race
3rd Time trial

2nd Overall Auensteiner–Radsporttage

1st Stage 1

2nd Gent–Wevelgem
3rd Overall Energiewacht Tour

1st Points classification

5th Overall Belgium Tour
5th Chrono Champenois
6th UCI Road World Championships – Women's time trial
8th Time trial, Summer Olympics
8th Overall Thüringen Rundfahrt

1st German rider classification

8th Overall Holland Ladies Tour

1st Stage 5

2017
1st Overall Internationale Thüringen Rundfahrt der Frauen

1st German rider classification
1st Prologue

National Road Championships

2nd Road race
2nd Time trial

3rd Overall Healthy Ageing Tour

1st Stage 3

3rd Tour of Flanders
3rd Dwars door Vlaanderen
3rd Prudential RideLondon Classique
3rd Crescent Vårgårda UCI Women's WorldTour TTT
3rd Race Melbourne – Albert Park
4th Overall Holland Ladies Tour

1st Points classification
1st Stage 4

5th Gent–Wevelgem
2018
1st Time trial, National Road Championships
1st Overall Internationale Thüringen Rundfahrt der Frauen

1st German rider classification
1st Stage 4

3rd Road race, UEC European Road Championships
5th Three Days of Bruges–De Panne
5th Team time trial, Crescent Vårgårda UCI Women's WorldTour
7th Overall Madrid Challenge by La Vuelta
8th Tour of Flanders
10th Overall Healthy Ageing Tour
2019
National Road Championships

1st Road race
3rd Time trial

1st Overall Grand Prix Elsy Jacobs

1st Points classification
1st Stage 2

1st Overall Madrid Challenge by la Vuelta

1st Stage 1 (ITT)

1st Stage 4b Healthy Ageing Tour
2nd Mixed team relay
UEC European Road Championships

2nd Team relay
7th Road race

6th Overall Women's Tour de Yorkshire
8th Overall Holland Ladies Tour
8th Tour of Flanders
9th Overall Thüringen Rundfahrt
9th UCI Road World Championships – Women's road race
10th UCI Road World Championships – Women's time trial
2020
UEC European Road Championships

1st Mixed team relay
4th Time trial
6th Road race

1st Road race, National Road Championships
1st Overall Challenge by La Vuelta

1st Points classification
1st Stage 2 (ITT)

2nd Three Days of Bruges–De Panne
3rd Gent–Wevelgem
4th UCI Road World Championships – Women's time trial
4th Tour of Flanders
8th Strade Bianche
9th UCI Road World Championships – Women's road race
2021
1st UCI Road World Championships – Mixed team relay
National Road Championships

1st Time trial
1st Road race

2nd Overall Healthy Ageing Tour
2nd Tour of Flanders
3rd Time trial, UEC European Road Championships
3rd Gent–Wevelgem
4th Paris–Roubaix
5th UCI Road World Championships – Women's time trial
Olympic Games

6th Road race
6th Time trial

7th Omloop Het Nieuwsblad
9th UCI Road World Championships – Women's road race
2022
1st Time trial, National Road Championships
4th Road race, UEC European Road Championships

==== Results timelines ====
Stage race results timeline
Grand Tour	2006	2007	2008	2009	2010	2011	2012	2013	2014	2015	2016	2017	2018	2019	2020	2021	2022
Giro d'Italia Femminile	—	—	—	—	—	—	59	—	—	—	—	—	—	—	45	19	—
Stage race	2006	2007	2008	2009	2010	2011	2012	2013	2014	2015	2016	2017	2018	2019	2020	2021	2022
Grand Prix Elsy Jacobs	—	—	—	45	—	—	—	—	—	—	—	—	—	1	NH	—	—
Tour of California	Did not exist									49	27	—	—	38	Not held		
Emakumeen Euskal Bira	—	—	38	—	33	38	30	14	18	—	—	—	21	—	Not held		
Giro del Trentino Alto Adige-Südtirol	—	—	—	—	—	22	22	41	—	—	—	—	Did not exist				
The Women's Tour	Did not exist								16	1	DNF	22	30	20	NH	—	—
Thüringen Rundfahrt der Frauen	DNF	—	58	—	13	33	—	3	3	5	8	1	1	9	NH	13	36
Belgium Tour	Did not exist						3	2	—	—	5	—	—	—	NH	—	—
Ladies Tour of Norway	Did not exist								DNF	—	—	—	—	—	NH	—	NH
Holland Ladies Tour	—	—	—	—	32	12	—	15	2	1	8	4	28	8	NH	—	—

Legend
—	Did not compete
DNF	Did not finish
NH	Not held

=== Track ===
2008
2nd Team pursuit, 2008–09 UCI Track Cycling World Cup Classics, Manchester
9th Individual pursuit, UEC European Under-23 Championships
2009
2nd Team pursuit, 2009–10 UCI Track Cycling World Cup Classics, Manchester
3rd Team pursuit, 2008–09 UCI Track Cycling World Cup Classics, Copenhagen
3rd Team pursuit, UEC European Under-23 Championships
2010
2nd Team pursuit, 2010–11 UCI Track Cycling World Cup Classics, Melbourne
2nd Individual pursuit, National Championships
3rd Team pursuit, UEC European Championships
2011
National Championships

1st Omnium
3rd Individual pursuit

2nd Team pursuit, UEC European Championships
3rd Team pursuit, 2011–12 UCI Track Cycling World Cup, Astana
4th Omnium, 2010–11 UCI Track Cycling World Cup Classics, Manchester
2013
1st Individual pursuit, National Championships
2018
UEC European Championships

1st Individual pursuit
3rd Team pursuit

1st Individual pursuit, National Championships
2019
2nd Individual pursuit, UCI World Championships
Team pursuit, 2019–20 UCI Track Cycling World Cup

2nd Minsk
2nd Glasgow

UEC European Championships

2nd Individual pursuit
2nd Team pursuit

2020
UCI World Championships

2nd Individual pursuit
3rd Team pursuit

2021
1st Team pursuit, Olympic Games
UCI World Championships

1st Individual pursuit
1st Team pursuit

UEC European Championships

1st Individual pursuit
1st Team pursuit

2022
UEC European Championships

1st Team pursuit
2nd Individual pursuit
