= Pernille Mathiesen =

Danish cyclist (born 1997)

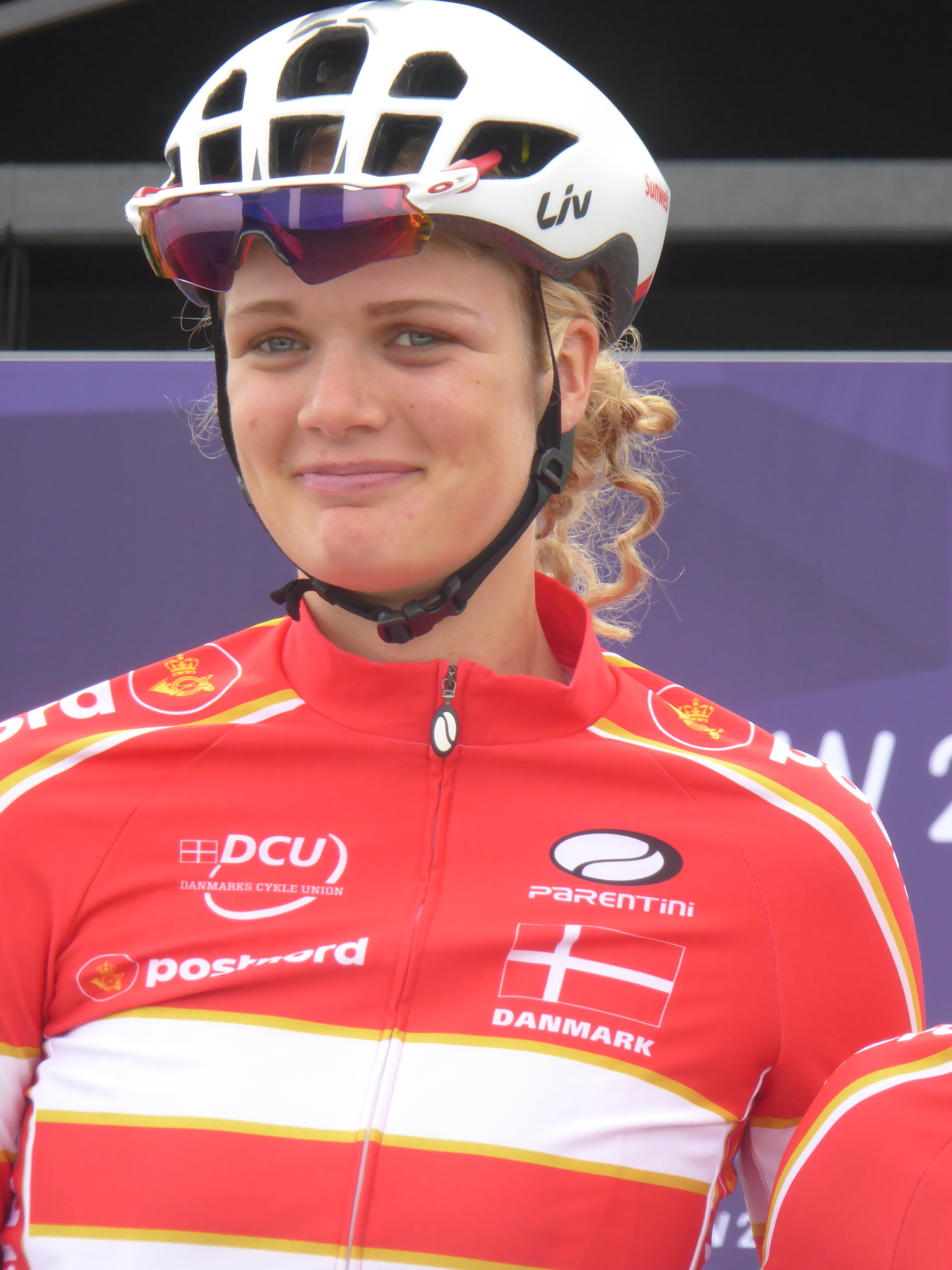
- Mathiesen at the 2018 European Road Cycling Championships.

Personal information
- Full name: Pernille Mathiesen
- Born: 5 October 1997 (age 29) Holstebro, Denmark

Cycling career
- Sport: Cycling
- Current team: Visma–Lease a Bike
- Discipline: Road
- Role: Rider
- Rider type: Time trialist

Amateur team
- 2015: Team BMS BIRN

Professional teams
- 2016–2017: Team BMS BIRN
- 2018–2020: Team Sunweb
- 2021–: Team Jumbo–Visma

Pernille Mathiesen (born 5 October 1997) is a Danish professional racing cyclist, who currently rides for UCI Women's Continental Team Visma–Lease a Bike.

== Major results ==
2016
1st Stage 4 Gracia–Orlová
2017
UEC European Under-23 Road Championships

1st Road race
1st Time trial

1st Combativity classification, Stage 4 Holland Ladies Tour
National Road Championships

2nd Time trial
4th Road race

== See also ==
- List of 2016 UCI Women's Teams and riders
