= 2015 UEC European Track Championships – Women's individual pursuit =

Women's individual pursuit at the 2015 UEC European Track Championships
- UEC European Champion jersey
- Venue: Velodrome Suisse, Grenchen
- Date: 18 October
- Competitors: 25 from 15 nations

Medalists
gold medal	Katie Archibald	Great Britain
silver medal	Élise Delzenne	France
bronze medal	Ciara Horne	Great Britain

The Women's individual pursuit was held on 18 October 2015.

== Results ==
=== Qualifying ===
The fastest 4 competitors qualify for the medal finals.

Rank	Name	Nation	Time	Notes
1	Katie Archibald	Great Britain	3:31.959	QG
2	Élise Delzenne	France	3:36.047	QG
3	Ciara Horne	Great Britain	3:36.735	QB
4	Mieke Kröger	Germany	3:37.744	QB
6	Gudrun Stock	Germany	3:38.154	
6	Katarzyna Pawłowska	Poland	3:39.158	
7	Melanie Späth	Ireland	3:40.698	
8	Tamara Balabolina	Russia	3:41.845	
9	Coralie Demay	France	3:41.909	
10	Edita Mazurevičiūtė	Lithuania	3:42.096	
11	Gloria Rodríguez	Spain	3:42.314	
12	Agata Drozdek	Poland	3:42.462	
13	Silvia Valsecchi	Italy	3:42.633	
14	Aleksandra Goncharova	Russia	3:43.919	
15	Beatrice Bartelloni	Italy	3:43.945	
16	Irene Usabiaga	Spain	3:44.815	
17	Katsiaryna Piatrouskaya	Belarus	3:45.148	
18	Ina Savenka	Belarus	3:46.531	
19	Doris Schweizer	Switzerland	3:46.612	
20	Josie Knight	Ireland	3:47.228	
21	Kaat Van der Meulen	Belgium	3:47.736	
22	Eleni Michalitsa Tsavari	Greece	3:53.118	
23	Sara Ferrara	Finland	3:55.286	
24	Vaida Pikauskaitė	Lithuania	3:55.449	
25	Inna Metalnikova	Ukraine	3:55.735	

- QG = qualified for gold medal final
- QB = qualified for bronze medal final

=== Finals ===
The final classification is determined in the medal finals.

Rank	Name	Nation	Time	Notes
Bronze medal final
3rd place, bronze medalist(s)	Ciara Horne	Great Britain	3:35.288	
4	Mieke Kröger	Germany	3:36.372	
Gold medal final
1st place, gold medalist(s)	Katie Archibald	Great Britain	3:32.832	
2nd place, silver medalist(s)	Élise Delzenne	France	3:37.331	
