= 2015 UEC European Track Championships – Women's elimination race =

Women's elimination race at the 2015 UEC European Track Championships
- UEC European Champion jersey
- Venue: Velodrome Suisse, Grenchen
- Date: 18 October
- Competitors: 14 from 14 nations

Medalists
gold medal	Katie Archibald	Great Britain
silver medal	Annalisa Cucinotta	Italy
bronze medal	Irene Usabiaga	Spain

The Women's elimination race was held on 18 October 2015.

== Results ==
Rank	Name	Nation
1st place, gold medalist(s)	Katie Archibald	Great Britain
2nd place, silver medalist(s)	Annalisa Cucinotta	Italy
3rd place, bronze medalist(s)	Irene Usabiaga	Spain
4	Kirsten Wild	Netherlands
5	Kaat Van der Meulen	Belgium
6	Tamara Balabolina	Russia
7	Fiona Dutriaux	France
8	Łucja Pietrzak	Poland
9	Jarmila Machačová	Czech Republic
10	Lisa Klein	Germany
11	Iryna Semionova	Ukraine
12	Kristina Jakubovskaja	Lithuania
13	Lauren Creamer	Ireland
14	Sara Ferrara	Finland
