= 2021 UEC European Track Championships – Women's madison =

Women's madison at the 2021 UEC European Track Championships
- Venue: Tissot Velodrome, Grenchen
- Date: 9 October
- Competitors: 32 from 16 nations
- Teams: 16
- Winning points: 63

Medalists
gold medal	Katie Archibald; Neah Evans	Great Britain
silver medal	Amalie Dideriksen; Julie Leth	Denmark
bronze medal	Victoire Berteau; Marion Borras	France

The women's madison competition at the 2021 UEC European Track Championships was held on 9 October 2021.

== Results ==
120 laps (30 km) were raced with 12 sprints.

Rank	Name	Nation	Lap points	Sprint points	Finish order	Total points
1st place, gold medalist(s)	Katie Archibald; Neah Evans	Great Britain	20	43	1	63
2nd place, silver medalist(s)	Amalie Dideriksen; Julie Leth	Denmark	20	30	2	50
3rd place, bronze medalist(s)	Victoire Berteau; Marion Borras	France	20	29	4	49
4	Michelle Andres; Léna Mettraux	Switzerland	20	3	5	23
5	Mariia Miliaeva; Maria Novolodskaya	Russia	20	2	9	22
6	Rachele Barbieri; Silvia Zanardi	Italy	0	19	3	19
7	Wiktoria Pikulik; Nikol Płosaj	Poland	0	8	10	8
8	Marit Raaijmakers; Maike van der Duin	Netherlands	0	6	11	6
9	Laura Süßemilch; Lea Lin Teutenberg	Germany	0	2	14	2
10	Shari Bossuyt; Katrijn De Clercq	Belgium	0	1	6	1
11	Tania Calvo; Eukene Larrarte	Spain	0	0	13	0
12	Kseniia Fedotova; Tetyana Klimchenko	Ukraine	0	0	15	0
13	Emily Kay; Alice Sharpe	Ireland	–40	0	7	–40
14	Jarmila Machačová; Petra Ševčíková	Czech Republic	–60	0	8	–60
15	Nastassia Kiptsikava; Hanna Tserakh	Belarus	–80	0	12	–80
16	Johanna Kitti Borissza; Tamara László	Hungary	–20	0	–	DNF
