= 2017 UEC European Track Championships – Women's individual pursuit =

Women's individual pursuit at the 2017 UEC European Track Championships
- UEC European Champion jersey
- Venue: Velodrom, Berlin
- Date: 20 October
- Competitors: 20 from 13 nations
- Winning time: 3:29.328

Medalists
gold medal	Katie Archibald	Great Britain
silver medal	Justyna Kaczkowska	Poland
bronze medal	Silvia Valsecchi	Italy

The Women's individual pursuit was held on 20 October 2017.

== Results ==
=== Qualifying ===
The fastest 4 competitors qualify for the medal finals.

Rank	Name	Nation	Time	Notes
1	Katie Archibald	Great Britain	3:28.003	QG
2	Justyna Kaczkowska	Poland	3:30.442	QG
3	Annemiek van Vleuten	Netherlands	3:33.607	QB
4	Silvia Valsecchi	Italy	3:33.757	QB
5	Simona Frapporti	Italy	3:34.224	
6	Gudrun Stock	Germany	3:37.795	
7	Marion Borras	France	3:39.608	
8	Lisa Klein	Germany	3:39.688	
9	Anastasiia Iakovenko	Russia	3:39.816	
10	Élise Delzenne	France	3:40.665	
11	Anna Nahirna	Ukraine	3:41.491	
12	Andrea Waldis	Switzerland	3:42.813	
13	Ina Savenka	Belarus	3:42.936	
14	Pia Pensaari	Finland	3:43.157	
15	Manon Lloyd	Great Britain	3:44.659	
16	Annelies Dom	Belgium	3:44.739	
17	Wiktoria Pikulik	Poland	3:45.912	
18	Tereza Medveďová	Slovakia	3:51.324	
19	Katsiaryna Piatrouskaya	Belarus	3:51.992	
20	Léna Mettraux	Switzerland	3:52.009	

=== Finals ===
The final classification is determined in the medal finals.

Rank	Name	Nation	Time	Notes
Bronze medal final
3rd place, bronze medalist(s)	Silvia Valsecchi	Italy	3:33.908	
4	Annemiek van Vleuten	Netherlands	3:36.581	
Gold medal final
1st place, gold medalist(s)	Katie Archibald	Great Britain	3:29.328	
2nd place, silver medalist(s)	Justyna Kaczkowska	Poland	3:32.452	
