= Anna Turvey =

Irish cyclist

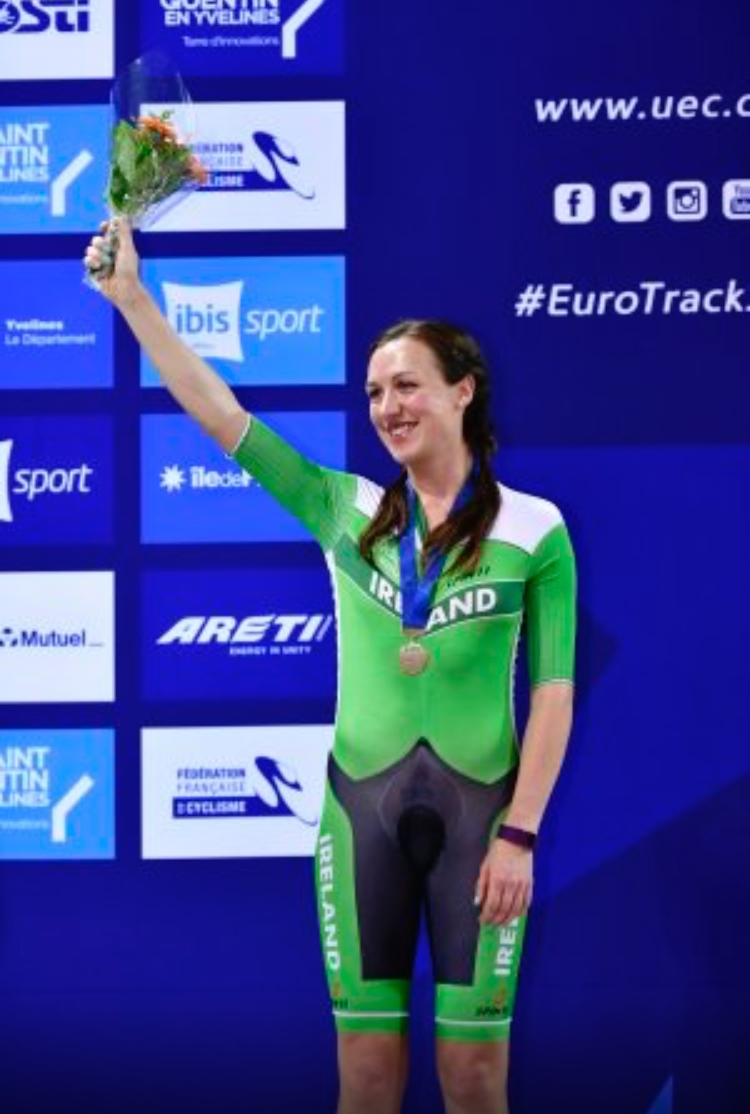
- Anna Turvey European Track Cycling Championships 2016

Personal information
- Full name: Anna Catherine Turvey
- Born: 5 February 1980 (age 46) Sunderland, Tyne and Wear, England
- Height: 5 ft 10 in (178 cm)

Cycling career
- Sport: Cycling
- Current team: Tyneside Vagabonds CC
- Disciplines: Road and track
- Role: Rider

Amateur teams
- 2013: Tyneside Vagabonds CC
- 2014–2015: Pearl Izumi Sports Tours International
- 2016–present: Tyneside Vagabonds CC
Medal record
Representing Ireland
Women's track cycling
European Championships
Bronze medal – third place	2016 Yvelines	Individual pursuit

Anna Turvey (born 5 February 1980) is a racing cyclist competing for Ireland. She holds the Irish National records for the 10 miles, 25 miles and 50 miles individual time trials.

== Career ==
In 2013, while competing as an amateur triathlete, Turvey finished second in RTTC National 25-mile time trial and top 10 in The British Elite time trial. Turvey joined the Scottish Cycling Performance Program in November 2013 with a view to competing in the 2014 Commonwealth Games. Turvey qualified to represent Scotland at the 2014 Commonwealth Games in the Road Time Trial and the Individual Pursuit on the track, finishing 9th in the road time trial and 12th in the individual pursuit.

Turvey declared for Ireland in December 2015, qualifying through her Mother. Turvey won the individual time trial at the Irish National Cycling Championships in June 2016. In 2016, she rode for Ireland at the 2016 European Road Championships and in the women's time trial event at the 2016 UCI Road World Championships.

Turvey answered a last minute call to ride for Ireland in the team pursuit in the 2016 UEC European Track Championships in Paris. While there she also competed in the Individual pursuit, finishing 8th in the team pursuit, with Lydia Boylan, Lydia Gurley and Eileen Burns, and 3rd in the Individual pursuit

Away from cycling, Turvey works as an Optometrist. She is the cousin of British Professional Racing driver Oliver Turvey.

== Major results ==
2019
2nd Irish National Road Championships Elite Women Time Trial
2nd RTTC National 10-mile Championships
12th UEC Road European Championships Elite Women Individual Time Trial
34th UCI Road World Championships Elite Women Individual Time trial
2018
3rd RTTC National 25 Mile Road Time Trial Championships
1st RTTC National 10 Miles Road Time Trial Championships
7th Chrono Champenois Trophee Europeen (1.1) (Betheny, France)(
1st RTTC National 50 Mile Road Time Trial Championships
9th Chrono des Nations Elite Women Individual Time trial WE (1.1) (Les Herbiers, France)
Beryl Burton Trophy (Champions of Champions)
2017
19th European Road cycling Championships individual time trial (Herning, Denmark)
3rd RTTC National 25-mile Individual Time Trial Championships
17th Individual Pursuit UCI Track World Championships (Hong Kong)
10th Individual Pursuit UCI Track cycling World Cup IV (Los Angeles)
2016
1st Irish National Road Championships Elite Women Time Trial, Irish National Cycling Championships
10th Irish National Road Championships Elite Women Road Race, Irish National Cycling Championships
2nd RCTT National 25 Miles Championship
2nd RCTT National 10 Miles Championship
24th European Elite Road cycling Championships (Plumelec, France)
28th UCI Road World Championships (Doha, Qatar)
3rd European Track Championships 2016 Elite Women 3 km Individual Pursuit 2016 UEC European Track Championships
8th European Track Championships 2016 Elite Women Team Pursuit with Lydia Boylan, Lydia Gurley and Eileen Burns

2015
1st RTTC National Team Time Trial Championship with Katie Archibald and Ciara Horne

2014
9th Commonwealth Games Individual Time Trial
12th Commonwealth Games 3 km Individual Pursuit
1st (Scotland) Individual Pursuit, Scottish National Championships Scottish National Track Championships
1st (Scotland) Scottish Cycling National 25 Mile Time Trial Championships

2013
1st British National Duathlon Championships (Age Group)
1st British National Sprint Distance Triathlon Championships (Age Group)
8th British Elite Road cycling Time Trial
2nd RTTC National 50 Miles Road Time Trial Championship
2nd RTTC National 25 miles Road Time Trial Championships
4th ITU World Triathlon Final (Age Group) (London)
2nd Individual Pursuit, Scottish National Track Championships
13th Chrono des Nations Elite Women Individual Time trial
2012
1st British National Duathlon Championships (Age Group)
3rd ITU World Triathlon Final (Age Group) (Auckland)

2011

2nd ETU Duathlon European Championships (Limerick, Ireland)
1st ETU Triathlon European (sprint distance) Championships (Age Group) (Pontevedra, Spain)
2nd ITU World Triathlon Final Sprint Distance (Age Group) (Beijing, China)

== See also ==
- 2016 national road cycling championships
