= 2016 UEC European Track Championships – Women's omnium =

Women's omnium at the 2016 UEC European Track Championships
- UEC European Champion jersey
- Venue: Vélodrome de Saint-Quentin-en-Yvelines, Yvelines
- Date: 22 October
- Competitors: 20 from 20 nations

Medalists
| gold medal | Katie Archibald | Great Britain |
| silver medal | Kirsten Wild | Netherlands |
| bronze medal | Lotte Kopecky | Belgium |

The Women's omnium was held on 22 October 2016; 20 riders competed across four events.

== Results ==
=== Scratch race ===
Standings after 1 event.

| Rank | Name | Nation | Laps down | Event points |
|---|---|---|---|---|
| 1 | Anita Stenberg | Norway | | 40 |
| 2 | Aušrinė Trebaitė | Lithuania | | 38 |
| 3 | Maryna Shmayankova | Belarus | | 36 |
| 4 | Pia Pensaari | Finland | | 34 |
| 5 | Katie Archibald | Great Britain | -1 | 32 |
| 6 | Kirsten Wild | Netherlands | -1 | 30 |
| 7 | Elisa Balsamo | Italy | -1 | 28 |
| 8 | Lotte Kopecky | Belgium | -1 | 26 |
| 9 | Tetyana Klimchenko | Ukraine | -1 | 24 |
| 10 | Alžbeta Pavlendová | Slovakia | -1 | 22 |
| 11 | Lucie Hochmann | Czech Republic | -1 | 20 |
| 12 | Roxane Fournier | France | -1 | 18 |
| 13 | Ana Usabiaga | Spain | -1 | 16 |
| 14 | Evgenia Romanyuta | Russia | -1 | 14 |
| 15 | Lydia Boylan | Ireland | -1 | 12 |
| 16 | Gudrun Stock | Germany | -1 | 10 |
| 17 | Johanna Kitti Borissza | Hungary | -1 | 8 |
| 18 | Virginie Perizzolo Pointet | Switzerland | -1 | 6 |
| 19 | Verena Eberhardt | Austria | -1 | 4 |
| 20 | Daria Pikulik | Poland | -1 | 2 |

=== Tempo race ===
Standings after 2 events.

| Rank | Name | Nation | Points in race | Finish order | Event points | Overall rank | Subtotal |
|---|---|---|---|---|---|---|---|
| 1 | Kirsten Wild | Netherlands | 12 | 14 | 40 | 1 | 70 |
| 2 | Lotte Kopecky | Belgium | 10 | 16 | 38 | 3 | 64 |
| 3 | Katie Archibald | Great Britain | 8 | 4 | 36 | 2 | 68 |
| 4 | Elisa Balsamo | Italy | 6 | 12 | 34 | 4 | 62 |
| 5 | Evgenia Romanyuta | Russia | 2 | 11 | 32 | 9 | 46 |
| 6 | Lydia Boylan | Ireland | 1 | 1 | 30 | 11 | 42 |
| 7 | Lucie Hochmann | Czech Republic | 1 | 2 | 28 | 8 | 48 |
| 8 | Roxane Fournier | France | 1 | 5 | 26 | 10 | 44 |
| 9 | Gudrun Stock | Germany | 1 | 13 | 24 | 14 | 34 |
| 10 | Maryna Shmayankova | Belarus | 0 | 3 | 22 | 5 | 58 |
| 11 | Alžbeta Pavlendová | Slovakia | 0 | 6 | 20 | 12 | 42 |
| 12 | Anita Stenberg | Norway | 0 | 7 | 18 | 6 | 58 |
| 13 | Ana Usabiaga | Spain | 0 | 8 | 16 | 16 | 32 |
| 14 | Verena Eberhardt | Austria | 0 | 9 | 14 | 17 | 18 |
| 15 | Aušrinė Trebaitė | Lithuania | 0 | 10 | 12 | 7 | 50 |
| 16 | Tetyana Klimchenko | Ukraine | 0 | 15 | 10 | 15 | 34 |
| 17 | Johanna Kitti Borissza | Hungary | 0 | 17 | 8 | 18 | 16 |
| 18 | Pia Pensaari | Finland | 0 | 18 | 6 | 13 | 40 |
| 19 | Virginie Perizzolo Pointet | Switzerland | 0 | 19 | 4 | 19 | 10 |
| — | Daria Pikulik | Poland | DNS | — | — | 20 | DNF |

=== Elimination race ===
Standings after 3 events.

| Rank | Name | Nation | Event points | Overall rank | Subtotal |
|---|---|---|---|---|---|
| 1 | Katie Archibald | Great Britain | 40 | 1 | 108 |
| 2 | Lotte Kopecky | Belgium | 38 | 2 | 102 |
| 3 | Anita Stenberg | Norway | 36 | 5 | 94 |
| 4 | Elisa Balsamo | Italy | 34 | 4 | 96 |
| 5 | Alžbeta Pavlendová | Slovakia | 32 | 8 | 74 |
| 6 | Kirsten Wild | Netherlands | 30 | 3 | 100 |
| 7 | Lucie Hochmann | Czech Republic | 28 | 7 | 76 |
| 8 | Ana Usabiaga | Spain | 26 | 12 | 58 |
| 9 | Johanna Kitti Borissza | Hungary | 24 | 16 | 40 |
| 10 | Roxane Fournier | France | 22 | 9 | 66 |
| 11 | Maryna Shmayankova | Belarus | 20 | 6 | 78 |
| 12 | Lydia Boylan | Ireland | 18 | 10 | 60 |
| 13 | Tetyana Klimchenko | Ukraine | 16 | 13 | 50 |
| 14 | Evgenia Romanyuta | Russia | 14 | 11 | 60 |
| 15 | Gudrun Stock | Germany | 12 | 15 | 46 |
| 16 | Verena Eberhardt | Austria | 10 | 17 | 28 |
| 17 | Pia Pensaari | Finland | 8 | 14 | 48 |
| 18 | Virginie Perizzolo Pointet | Switzerland | 6 | 18 | 16 |
| — | Daria Pikulik | Poland | DNS | 19 | DNF |
| — | Aušrinė Trebaitė | Lithuania | DSQ^{[A]} | 19 | DNF |

==== Note ====
^{^{A}}

=== Points race and final standings ===
Riders' points from the previous 3 events were carried into the points race, in which the final standings were decided.

| Overall rank | Name | Nation | Subtotal | Sprint points | Lap points | Finish order | Final standings |
|---|---|---|---|---|---|---|---|
| 1st place, gold medalist(s) | Katie Archibald | Great Britain | 108 | 13 | 20 | 6 | 141 |
| 2nd place, silver medalist(s) | Kirsten Wild | Netherlands | 100 | 15 | 20 | 4 | 135 |
| 3rd place, bronze medalist(s) | Lotte Kopecky | Belgium | 102 | 9 | 20 | 3 | 131 |
| 4 | Elisa Balsamo | Italy | 96 | 6 | 20 | 5 | 122 |
| 5 | Anita Stenberg | Norway | 94 | 4 | 20 | 12 | 118 |
| 6 | Lydia Boylan | Ireland | 60 | 10 | 40 | 8 | 110 |
| 7 | Roxane Fournier | France | 66 | 3 | 20 | 16 | 89 |
| 8 | Lucie Hochmann | Czech Republic | 76 | 3 | 0 | 9 | 79 |
| 9 | Maryna Shmayankova | Belarus | 78 | 1 | 0 | 15 | 79 |
| 10 | Evgenia Romanyuta | Russia | 60 | 15 | 0 | 1 | 75 |
| 11 | Alžbeta Pavlendová | Slovakia | 74 | 0 | 0 | 13 | 74 |
| 12 | Tetyana Klimchenko | Ukraine | 50 | 16 | 0 | 2 | 66 |
| 13 | Ana Usabiaga | Spain | 58 | 3 | 0 | 18 | 61 |
| 14 | Verena Eberhardt | Austria | 28 | 1 | 20 | 11 | 49 |
| 15 | Pia Pensaari | Finland | 48 | 0 | 0 | 17 | 48 |
| 16 | Gudrun Stock | Germany | 46 | 0 | 0 | 7 | 46 |
| 17 | Johanna Kitti Borissza | Hungary | 40 | 0 | 0 | 10 | 40 |
| 18 | Virginie Perizzolo Pointet | Switzerland | 16 | 0 | 0 | 14 | 16 |
| 19 | Daria Pikulik | Poland | — | — | — | — | DNF |
| 19 | Aušrinė Trebaitė | Lithuania | — | — | — | — | DNF |
