= 2018 UEC European Track Championships – Women's individual pursuit =

Women's individual pursuit at the 2018 UEC European Track Championships
- Venue: Sir Chris Hoy Velodrome, Glasgow
- Date: 4 August
- Competitors: 25 from 14 nations
- Winning time: 3:26.879

Medalists
gold medal	Lisa Brennauer	Germany
silver medal	Katie Archibald	Great Britain
bronze medal	Justyna Kaczkowska	Poland

The women's individual pursuit competition at the 2018 UEC European Track Championships was held on 4 August 2018.

== Results ==
=== Qualifying ===
The first two racers race for gold, the third and fourth fastest rider race for the bronze medal.

Rank	Name	Nation	Time	Behind	Notes
1	Lisa Brennauer	Germany	3:28.152		QG
2	Katie Archibald	Great Britain	3:30.893	+2.741	QG
3	Justyna Kaczkowska	Poland	3:33.355	+5.203	QB
4	Ina Savenka	Belarus	3:34.233	+6.081	QB
5	Coralie Demay	France	3:34.563	+6.411	
6	Gudrun Stock	Germany	3:34.775	+6.623	
7	Trine Schmidt	Denmark	3:36.549	+8.397	
8	Aksana Salauyeva	Belarus	3:37.514	+9.362	
9	Martina Alzini	Italy	3:37.881	+9.729	
10	Julie Leth	Denmark	3:38.328	+10.176	
11	Kelly Murphy	Ireland	3:39.317	+11.165	
12	Ellie Dickinson	Great Britain	3:39.544	+11.392	
13	Simona Frapporti	Italy	3:39.821	+11.669	
14	Łucja Pietrzak	Poland	3:39.945	+11.793	
15	Andrea Waldis	Switzerland	3:40.676	+12.524	
16	Valeriya Kononenko	Ukraine	3:41.436	+13.284	
17	Anna Nahirna	Ukraine	3:42.872	+14.720	
18	Annelies Dom	Belgium	3:44.537	+16.385	
19	Léna Mettraux	Switzerland	3:46.293	+18.141	
20	Victoire Berteau	France	3:47.117	+18.965	
21	Mia Griffin	Ireland	3:48.605	+20.453	
22	Pia Pensaari	Finland	3:49.240	+21.088	
23	Isabelle Beckers	Belgium	3:50.632	+22.480	
24	Tereza Medveďová	Slovakia	3:51.813	+23.661	
25	Kristina Kazlauskaitė	Lithuania	3:58.776	+30.624	

- QG = qualified for gold medal final
- QB = qualified for bronze medal final

=== Finals ===
Rank	Name	Nation	Time	Behind	Notes
Gold medal final
1st place, gold medalist(s)	Lisa Brennauer	Germany	3:26.879		
2nd place, silver medalist(s)	Katie Archibald	Great Britain	3:29.577	+2.698	
Bronze medal final
3rd place, bronze medalist(s)	Justyna Kaczkowska	Poland	3:34.750		
4	Ina Savenka	Belarus	3:38.547	+3.797	
