= 2021 UEC European Track Championships – Women's omnium =

Cycling competition

Women's omnium at the 2021 UEC European Track Championships
- Venue: Tissot Velodrome, Grenchen
- Date: 7 October
- Competitors: 20 from 20 nations
- Winning points: 154

Medalists
gold medal	Katie Archibald	Great Britain
silver medal	Victoire Berteau	France
bronze medal	Rachele Barbieri	Italy

The women's omnium competition at the 2021 UEC European Track Championships was held on 7 October 2021.

== Results ==
=== Scratch race ===
Rank	Name	Nation	Laps down	Event points
1	Katie Archibald	Great Britain		40
2	Rachele Barbieri	Italy		38
3	Daria Pikulik	Poland		36
4	Maike van der Duin	Netherlands		34
5	Olivija Baleišytė	Lithuania		32
6	Maria Martins	Portugal		30
7	Victoire Berteau	France		28
8	Alžbeta Bačíková	Slovakia		26
9	Amalie Dideriksen	Denmark		24
10	Lea Lin Teutenberg	Germany		22
11	Shari Bossuyt	Belgium		20
12	Eukene Larrarte	Spain		18
13	Gulnaz Khatuntseva	Russia		16
14	Emily Kay	Ireland		14
15	Aline Seitz	Switzerland		12
16	Hanna Solovey	Ukraine		10
17	Hanna Tserakh	Belarus		8
18	Anita Stenberg	Norway		6
19	Petra Ševčíková	Czech Republic		4
20	Johanna Kitti Borissza	Hungary		2

=== Tempo race ===
Rank	Name	Nation	Points in race	Event points
1	Katie Archibald	Great Britain	33	40
2	Victoire Berteau	France	23	38
3	Olivija Baleišytė	Lithuania	22	36
4	Hanna Solovey	Ukraine	21	34
5	Petra Ševčíková	Czech Republic	20	32
6	Maike van der Duin	Netherlands	2	30
7	Rachele Barbieri	Italy	0	28
8	Maria Martins	Portugal	1	26
9	Shari Bossuyt	Belgium	0	24
10	Hanna Tserakh	Belarus	0	22
11	Gulnaz Khatuntseva	Russia	0	20
12	Aline Seitz	Switzerland	0	18
13	Daria Pikulik	Poland	0	16
14	Lea Lin Teutenberg	Germany	0	14
15	Amalie Dideriksen	Denmark	0	12
16	Alžbeta Bačíková	Slovakia	0	10
17	Eukene Larrarte	Spain	0	8
18	Emily Kay	Ireland	0	6
19	Johanna Kitti Borissza	Hungary	–17	4
	Anita Stenberg	Norway	Did not start	

=== Elimination race ===
Rank	Name	Nation	Event points
1	Katie Archibald	Great Britain	40
2	Shari Bossuyt	Belgium	38
3	Victoire Berteau	France	36
4	Maike van der Duin	Netherlands	34
5	Rachele Barbieri	Italy	32
6	Lea Lin Teutenberg	Germany	30
7	Amalie Dideriksen	Denmark	28
8	Olivija Baleišytė	Lithuania	26
9	Gulnaz Khatuntseva	Russia	24
10	Hanna Solovey	Ukraine	22
11	Hanna Tserakh	Belarus	20
12	Eukene Larrarte	Spain	18
13	Petra Ševčíková	Czech Republic	16
14	Daria Pikulik	Poland	14
15	Emily Kay	Ireland	12
16	Johanna Kitti Borissza	Hungary	10
17	Alžbeta Bačíková	Slovakia	8
18	Aline Seitz	Switzerland	6
19	Maria Martins	Portugal	4

=== Points race and final standings ===
The final ranking is given by the sum of the points obtained in the 4 specialties.

Overall rank	Name	Nation	Scratch race	Tempo race	Elim. race	Subotal	Lap points	Sprint points	Finish order	Total points
1st place, gold medalist(s)	Katie Archibald	Great Britain	40	40	40	120	0	34	1	154
2nd place, silver medalist(s)	Victoire Berteau	France	28	38	36	102	0	18	2	120
3rd place, bronze medalist(s)	Rachele Barbieri	Italy	32	28	32	98	0	20	3	118
4	Maike van der Duin	Netherlands	34	30	34	98	0	5	13	103
5	Olivija Baleišytė	Lithuania	32	36	26	94	0	0	18	94
6	Shari Bossuyt	Belgium	20	24	38	82	0	0	11	82
7	Lea Lin Teutenberg	Germany	22	14	30	66	0	3	8	69
8	Amalie Dideriksen	Denmark	24	12	28	64	0	5	15	69
9	Hanna Solovey	Ukraine	10	34	22	66	0	2	6	68
10	Daria Pikulik	Poland	36	16	14	66	0	2	14	68
11	Gulnaz Khatuntseva	Russia	16	20	24	60	0	2	10	62
12	Maria Martins	Portugal	30	26	4	60	0	0	5	60
13	Hanna Tserakh	Belarus	8	22	20	50	0	2	7	52
14	Eukene Larrarte	Spain	18	8	18	44	0	1	16	45
15	Aline Seitz	Switzerland	12	18	6	36	0	2	4	38
16	Emily Kay	Ireland	14	6	12	32	0	3	9	35
17	Petra Ševčíková	Czech Republic	4	32	16	52	–20	0	12	32
18	Alžbeta Bačíková	Slovakia	26	10	8	44	–20	0	17	24
19	Johanna Kitti Borissza	Hungary	2	4	10	16	–60	0	19	–44
	Anita Stenberg	Norway	6	Did not start						DNF
