= 2019 UEC European Track Championships – Women's madison =

Women's madison at the 2019 UEC European Track Championships
- Venue: Omnisport Apeldoorn, Apeldoorn
- Date: 20 October
- Competitors: 28 from 14 nations
- Winning points: 33

Medalists
gold medal	Amalie Dideriksen; Julie Leth	Denmark
silver medal	Katie Archibald; Laura Kenny	Great Britain
bronze medal	Amy Pieters; Kirsten Wild	Netherlands

The women's madison competition at the 2019 UEC European Track Championships was held on 20 October 2019.

== Results ==
120 laps (30 km) were raced with 12 sprints.

Rank	Name	Nation	Lap points	Sprint points	Finish order	Total points
1st place, gold medalist(s)	Amalie Dideriksen; Julie Leth	Denmark		33	2	33
2nd place, silver medalist(s)	Katie Archibald; Laura Kenny	Great Britain		31	1	31
3rd place, bronze medalist(s)	Amy Pieters; Kirsten Wild	Netherlands		23	4	23
4	Maria Giulia Confalonieri; Letizia Paternoster	Italy		18	3	18
5	Clara Copponi; Marie Le Net	France		12	6	12
6	Daria Pikulik; Wiktoria Pikulik	Poland		8	7	8
7	Shari Bossuyt; Lotte Kopecky	Belgium		7	12	7
8	Lydia Boylan; Lydia Gurley	Ireland		5	8	5
9	Aline Seitz; Andrea Waldis	Switzerland		3	5	3
10	Franziska Brauße; Lisa Klein	Germany		2	11	2
11	Oksana Kliachina; Anna Nahirna	Ukraine		1	10	1
12	Tamara Dronova; Maria Novolodskaya	Russia		0	9	0
13	Palina Pivavarava; Ina Savenka	Belarus		0	13	0
14	Lucie Hochmann; Kateřina Kohoutková	Czech Republic	–80	0	14	–80
