= 2018 UEC European Track Championships – Women's omnium =

Women's omnium at the 2018 UEC European Track Championships
- Venue: Sir Chris Hoy Velodrome, Glasgow
- Date: 6 August
- Competitors: 21 from 21 nations
- Winning points: 156

Medalists
| gold medal | Kirsten Wild | Netherlands |
| silver medal | Katie Archibald | Great Britain |
| bronze medal | Letizia Paternoster | Italy |

The women's omnium competition at the 2018 UEC European Track Championships was held on 6 August 2018.

== Results ==
=== Scratch race ===
The scratch race was started at 14:25.

| Rank | Name | Nation | Laps down | Event points |
|---|---|---|---|---|
| 1 | Kirsten Wild | Netherlands | | 40 |
| 2 | Katie Archibald | Great Britain | | 38 |
| 3 | Daria Pikulik | Poland | | 36 |
| 4 | Letizia Paternoster | Italy | | 34 |
| 5 | Anna Knauer | Germany | | 32 |
| 6 | Lotte Kopecky | Belgium | | 30 |
| 7 | Laurie Berthon | France | | 28 |
| 8 | Amalie Dideriksen | Denmark | | 26 |
| 9 | Lydia Boylan | Ireland | | 24 |
| 10 | Alžbeta Bačíková | Slovakia | | 22 |
| 11 | Anita Stenberg | Norway | | 20 |
| 12 | Olivija Baleišytė | Lithuania | | 18 |
| 13 | Tetyana Klimchenko | Ukraine | | 16 |
| 14 | Evgenia Augustinas | Russia | | 14 |
| 15 | Andrea Waldis | Switzerland | | 12 |
| 16 | Verena Eberhardt | Austria | | 10 |
| 17 | Maria Martins | Portugal | | 8 |
| 18 | Ana Usabiaga | Spain | | 6 |
| 19 | Hanna Tserakh | Belarus | | 4 |
| 20 | Pia Pensaari | Finland | | 2 |
| 21 | Jarmila Machačová | Czech Republic | | 1 |

=== Tempo race ===
The tempo race was started at 16:10.

| Rank | Name | Nation | Points in race | Event points |
|---|---|---|---|---|
| 1 | Evgenia Augustinas | Russia | 22 | 40 |
| 2 | Lydia Boylan | Ireland | 10 | 38 |
| 3 | Lotte Kopecky | Belgium | 5 | 36 |
| 4 | Kirsten Wild | Netherlands | 3 | 34 |
| 5 | Katie Archibald | Great Britain | 2 | 32 |
| 6 | Letizia Paternoster | Italy | 1 | 30 |
| 7 | Laurie Berthon | France | 1 | 28 |
| 8 | Daria Pikulik | Poland | 1 | 26 |
| 9 | Olivija Baleišytė | Lithuania | 1 | 24 |
| 10 | Amalie Dideriksen | Denmark | 0 | 22 |
| 11 | Ana Usabiaga | Spain | 0 | 20 |
| 12 | Maria Martins | Portugal | 0 | 18 |
| 13 | Andrea Waldis | Switzerland | 0 | 16 |
| 14 | Hanna Tserakh | Belarus | 0 | 14 |
| 15 | Verena Eberhardt | Austria | 0 | 12 |
| 16 | Anna Knauer | Germany | 0 | 10 |
| 17 | Tetyana Klimchenko | Ukraine | 0 | 8 |
| 18 | Anita Stenberg | Norway | 0 | 6 |
| 19 | Alžbeta Bačíková | Slovakia | 0 | 4 |
| 20 | Pia Pensaari | Finland | 0 | 2 |
| 21 | Jarmila Machačová | Czech Republic | –20 | 1 |

=== Elimination race ===
The tempo race was started at 19:01.

| Rank | Name | Nation | Event points |
|---|---|---|---|
| 1 | Katie Archibald | Great Britain | 40 |
| 2 | Kirsten Wild | Netherlands | 38 |
| 3 | Letizia Paternoster | Italy | 36 |
| 4 | Anna Knauer | Germany | 34 |
| 5 | Olivija Baleišytė | Lithuania | 32 |
| 6 | Amalie Dideriksen | Denmark | 30 |
| 7 | Hanna Tserakh | Belarus | 28 |
| 8 | Evgenia Augustinas | Russia | 26 |
| 9 | Maria Martins | Portugal | 24 |
| 10 | Andrea Waldis | Switzerland | 22 |
| 11 | Laurie Berthon | France | 20 |
| 12 | Daria Pikulik | Poland | 18 |
| 13 | Lotte Kopecky | Belgium | 16 |
| 14 | Lydia Boylan | Ireland | 14 |
| 15 | Verena Eberhardt | Austria | 12 |
| 16 | Alžbeta Bačíková | Slovakia | 10 |
| 17 | Ana Usabiaga | Spain | 8 |
| 18 | Tetyana Klimchenko | Ukraine | 6 |
| 19 | Jarmila Machačová | Czech Republic | 4 |
| 20 | Anita Stenberg | Norway | 2 |
| 21 | Pia Pensaari | Finland | 1 |

=== Points race ===
The points race was started at 20:06.

| Rank | Name | Nation | Lap points | Sprint points | Total points | Finish order |
|---|---|---|---|---|---|---|
| 1 | Kirsten Wild | Netherlands | 20 | 24 | 44 | 17 |
| 2 | Katie Archibald | Great Britain | 20 | 14 | 34 | 18 |
| 3 | Evgenia Augustinas | Russia | 20 | 12 | 32 | 1 |
| 4 | Maria Martins | Portugal | 20 | 9 | 29 | 2 |
| 5 | Andrea Waldis | Switzerland | 20 | 4 | 24 | 16 |
| 6 | Lydia Boylan | Ireland | 20 | | 20 | 7 |
| 7 | Verena Eberhardt | Austria | 20 | | 20 | 14 |
| 8 | Letizia Paternoster | Italy | | 11 | 11 | 19 |
| 9 | Laurie Berthon | France | | 7 | 7 | 3 |
| 10 | Daria Pikulik | Poland | | 7 | 7 | 6 |
| 11 | Anita Stenberg | Norway | | 5 | 5 | 13 |
| 12 | Amalie Dideriksen | Denmark | | 3 | 3 | 12 |
| 13 | Jarmila Machačová | Czech Republic | | 2 | 2 | 4 |
| 14 | Lotte Kopecky | Belgium | | 1 | 1 | 15 |
| 15 | Hanna Tserakh | Belarus | | | 0 | 5 |
| 16 | Tetyana Klimchenko | Ukraine | | | 0 | 9 |
| 17 | Anna Knauer | Germany | | | 0 | 10 |
| 18 | Ana Usabiaga | Spain | | | 0 | 11 |
| 19 | Olivija Baleišytė | Lithuania | | | 0 | 20 |
| 20 | Alžbeta Bačíková | Slovakia | | | 0 | 21 |
| 21 | Pia Pensaari | Finland | –80 | | –80 | 8 |

=== Final ranking ===
The final ranking is given by the sum of the points obtained in the 4 specialties.

| Overall Rank | Name | Nation | Scratch Race | Tempo Race | Elim. Race | Points Race | Total Points |
|---|---|---|---|---|---|---|---|
| 1st place, gold medalist(s) | Kirsten Wild | Netherlands | 40 | 34 | 38 | 44 | 156 |
| 2nd place, silver medalist(s) | Katie Archibald | Great Britain | 38 | 32 | 40 | 34 | 144 |
| 3rd place, bronze medalist(s) | Letizia Paternoster | Italy | 34 | 30 | 36 | 11 | 111 |
| 4 | Evgenia Augustinas | Russia | 14 | 40 | 18 | 32 | 104 |
| 5 | Lydia Boylan | Ireland | 24 | 38 | 14 | 20 | 96 |
| 6 | Daria Pikulik | Poland | 36 | 26 | 22 | 7 | 91 |
| 7 | Laurie Berthon | France | 28 | 28 | 20 | 7 | 83 |
| 8 | Lotte Kopecky | Belgium | 30 | 36 | 16 | 1 | 83 |
| 9 | Maria Martins | Portugal | 8 | 18 | 26 | 29 | 81 |
| 10 | Amalie Dideriksen | Denmark | 26 | 22 | 30 | 3 | 81 |
| 11 | Anna Knauer | Germany | 32 | 10 | 34 | 0 | 76 |
| 12 | Andrea Waldis | Switzerland | 12 | 16 | 24 | 24 | 76 |
| 13 | Olivija Baleišytė | Lithuania | 18 | 24 | 32 | 0 | 74 |
| 14 | Verena Eberhardt | Austria | 10 | 12 | 12 | 20 | 54 |
| 15 | Hanna Tserakh | Belarus | 4 | 14 | 28 | 0 | 46 |
| 16 | Alžbeta Bačíková | Slovakia | 22 | 4 | 10 | 0 | 36 |
| 17 | Ana Usabiaga | Spain | 6 | 20 | 8 | 0 | 34 |
| 18 | Anita Stenberg | Norway | 20 | 6 | 2 | 5 | 33 |
| 19 | Tetyana Klimchenko | Ukraine | 16 | 8 | 6 | 0 | 30 |
| 20 | Jarmila Machačová | Czech Republic | 1 | 1 | 4 | 2 | 8 |
| 21 | Pia Pensaari | Finland | 2 | 2 | 1 | –80 | –75 |
