= 2014 UEC European Track Championships – Women's individual pursuit =

Women's individual pursuit at the 2014 UEC European Track Championships
- UEC European Champion jersey
- Venue: Vélodrome Amédée Détraux, Baie-Mahault
- Date: 19 October
- Competitors: 22 from 13 nations

Medalists
gold medal	Katie Archibald	Great Britain
silver medal	Mieke Kröger	Germany
bronze medal	Vilija Sereikaitė	Lithuania

The Women's individual pursuit was held on 19 October 2014.

== Results ==
=== Qualifying ===
The fastest 4 competitors qualify for the medal finals.

Rank	Name	Nation	Time	Notes
1	Katie Archibald	Great Britain	3:47.129	QG
2	Mieke Kröger	Germany	3:51.147	QG
3	Vilija Sereikaitė	Lithuania	3:52.671	QB
4	Eugenia Bujak	Poland	3:52.775	QB
6	Joanna Rowsell	Great Britain	3:54.182	
6	Aleksandra Goncharova	Russia	3:55.800	
7	Lotte Kopecky	Belgium	3:57.351	
8	Silvia Valsecchi	Italy	3:58.902	
9	Pascale Jeuland	France	3:59.559	
10	Irina Molicheva	Russia	3:59.814	
11	Beatrice Bartelloni	Italy	4:00.176	
12	Olena Pavlukhina	Azerbaijan	4:01.677	
13	Gloria Rodríguez	Spain	4:01.948	
14	Inna Metalnikova	Ukraine	4:02.353	
15	Gudrun Stock	Germany	4:03.687	
16	Melanie Späth	Ireland	4:03.920	
17	Katsiaryna Piatrouskaya	Belarus	4:03.946	
18	Edyta Jasińska	Poland	4:04.413	
19	Edita Mazurevičiūtė	Lithuania	4:04.666	
20	Saartje Vandenbroucke	Belgium	4:10.370	
21	Margot Dutour	France	4:11.440	
22	Irene Usabiaga	Spain	4:12.966	

- QG = qualified for gold medal final
- QB = qualified for bronze medal final

=== Finals ===
The final classification is determined in the medal finals.

Rank	Name	Nation	Time	Notes
Bronze medal final
3rd place, bronze medalist(s)	Vilija Sereikaitė	Lithuania	3:45.811	
4	Eugenia Bujak	Poland	3:48.329	
Gold medal final
1st place, gold medalist(s)	Katie Archibald	Great Britain	3:40.136	
2nd place, silver medalist(s)	Mieke Kröger	Germany	3:42.153	
