= 2021 UEC European Track Championships – Women's scratch =

European Track Championships

Women's scratch at the 2021 UEC European Track Championships
- Venue: Tissot Velodrome, Grenchen
- Date: 5 October
- Competitors: 19 from 19 nations

Medalists
gold medal	Katie Archibald	Great Britain
silver medal	Valentine Fortin	France
bronze medal	Daria Pikulik	Poland

The women's scratch competition at the 2021 UEC European Track Championships was held on 5 October 2021.

== Results ==
First rider across the line without a net lap loss wins.

Rank	Name	Nation	Laps down
1st place, gold medalist(s)	Katie Archibald	Great Britain	
2nd place, silver medalist(s)	Valentine Fortin	France	
3rd place, bronze medalist(s)	Daria Pikulik	Poland	
4	Maike van der Duin	Netherlands	
5	Martina Fidanza	Italy	
6	Olivija Baleišytė	Lithuania	
7	Emily Kay	Ireland	
8	Alžbeta Bačíková	Slovakia	
9	Hanna Tserakh	Belarus	
10	Aline Seitz	Switzerland	
11	Katrijn De Clercq	Belgium	
12	Tania Calvo	Spain	
13	Mariia Miliaeva	Russia	
14	Tetyana Klimchenko	Ukraine	
15	Anita Stenberg	Norway	
16	Lea Lin Teutenberg	Germany	
17	Johanna Kitti Borissza	Hungary	
18	Daniela Campos	Portugal	
19	Jarmila Machačová	Czech Republic	
