= 2020 UEC European Track Championships – Women's points race =

2020 women's points race competition

Women's points race at the 2020 UEC European Track Championships
- Venue: Kolodruma, Plovdiv
- Date: 14 November
- Competitors: 13 from 13 nations
- Winning points: 57

Medalists
gold medal	Katie Archibald	Great Britain
silver medal	Silvia Zanardi	Italy
bronze medal	Karolina Karasiewicz	Poland

The women's points race competition at the 2020 UEC European Track Championships was held on 14 November 2020.

== Results ==
100 laps (25 km) were raced with 10 sprints.

Rank	Name	Nation	Lap points	Sprint points	Finish order	Total points
1st place, gold medalist(s)	Katie Archibald	Great Britain	20	37	1	57
2nd place, silver medalist(s)	Silvia Zanardi	Italy	20	19	4	39
3rd place, bronze medalist(s)	Karolina Karasiewicz	Poland	20	15	2	35
4	Maria Martins	Portugal	20	5	6	25
5	Tamara Dronova	Russia	0	19	3	19
6	Ina Savenka	Belarus	0	7	10	7
7	Léna Mettraux	Switzerland	0	5	5	5
8	Jarmila Machačová	Czech Republic	0	5	7	5
9	Yuliia Biriukova	Ukraine	0	1	8	1
10	Ziortza Isasi	Spain	–20	5	12	–15
11	Tereza Medveďová	Slovakia	–20	0	9	–20
12	Argiro Milaki	Greece	–40	3	11	–37
	Johanna Kitti Borissza	Hungary	0	0	–	DNF
