= 2017 UEC European Track Championships – Women's omnium =

Women's omnium at the 2017 UEC European Track Championships
- UEC European Champion jersey
- Venue: Velodrom, Berlin
- Date: 21 October
- Competitors: 20 from 20 nations

Medalists
| gold medal | Katie Archibald | Great Britain |
| silver medal | Kirsten Wild | Netherlands |
| bronze medal | Elisa Balsamo | Italy |

The Women's omnium was held on 21 October 2017; 20 riders competed across four events.

== Results ==
=== Scratch race ===
Standings after 1 event.

| Rank | Name | Nation | Laps down | Event points |
|---|---|---|---|---|
| 1 | Anita Stenberg | Norway | | 40 |
| 2 | Gudrun Stock | Germany | | 38 |
| 3 | Aleksandra Goncharova | Russia | | 36 |
| 4 | Andrea Waldis | Switzerland | | 34 |
| 5 | Katie Archibald | Great Britain | | 32 |
| 6 | Kirsten Wild | Netherlands | | 30 |
| 7 | Elisa Balsamo | Italy | | 28 |
| 8 | Olivija Baleišytė | Lithuania | | 26 |
| 9 | Katarzyna Pawłowska | Poland | | 24 |
| 10 | Lydia Boylan | Ireland | | 22 |
| 11 | Amalie Dideriksen | Denmark | | 20 |
| 12 | Laurie Berthon | France | | 18 |
| 13 | Jarmila Machačová | Czech Republic | | 16 |
| 14 | Verena Eberhardt | Austria | | 14 |
| 15 | Alžbeta Bačíková | Slovakia | | 12 |
| 16 | Saartje Vandenbroucke | Belgium | | 10 |
| 17 | Ana Usabiaga | Spain | | 8 |
| 18 | Ina Savenka | Belarus | | 6 |
| 19 | Viktoriya Bondar | Ukraine | | 4 |
| 20 | Sara Ferrara | Finland | | 2 |

=== Tempo race ===
Standings after 2 events.

| Rank | Name | Nation | Points in race | Finish order | Event points | Overall rank | Subtotal |
|---|---|---|---|---|---|---|---|
| 1 | Katie Archibald | Great Britain | 28 | 15 | 40 | 3 | 72 |
| 2 | Aleksandra Goncharova | Russia | 23 | 12 | 38 | 2 | 74 |
| 3 | Kirsten Wild | Netherlands | 23 | 19 | 36 | 6 | 66 |
| 4 | Anita Stenberg | Norway | 22 | 4 | 34 | 1 | 74 |
| 5 | Andrea Waldis | Switzerland | 22 | 5 | 32 | 5 | 66 |
| 6 | Elisa Balsamo | Italy | 21 | 3 | 30 | 7 | 58 |
| 7 | Gudrun Stock | Germany | 20 | 10 | 28 | 4 | 66 |
| 8 | Lydia Boylan | Ireland | 20 | 14 | 26 | 8 | 48 |
| 9 | Jarmila Machačová | Czech Republic | 20 | 16 | 24 | 12 | 40 |
| 10 | Laurie Berthon | France | 3 | 3 | 22 | 11 | 40 |
| 11 | Katarzyna Pawłowska | Poland | 1 | 7 | 20 | 9 | 44 |
| 12 | Ina Savenka | Belarus | 1 | 11 | 18 | 15 | 24 |
| 13 | Olivija Baleišytė | Lithuania | 1 | 18 | 16 | 10 | 42 |
| 14 | Amalie Dideriksen | Denmark | 1 | 20 | 14 | 13 | 34 |
| 15 | Alžbeta Bačíková | Slovakia | 0 | 2 | 12 | 14 | 24 |
| 16 | Ana Usabiaga | Spain | 0 | 6 | 10 | 17 | 18 |
| 17 | Verena Eberhardt | Austria | 0 | 8 | 8 | 16 | 22 |
| 18 | Saartje Vandenbroucke | Belgium | 0 | 9 | 6 | 18 | 16 |
| 19 | Viktoriya Bondar | Ukraine | 0 | 13 | 4 | 19 | 8 |
| 20 | Sara Ferrara | Finland | 0 | 17 | 2 | 20 | 4 |

=== Elimination race ===
Standings after 3 events.

| Rank | Name | Nation | Event points | Overall rank | Subtotal |
|---|---|---|---|---|---|
| 1 | Katie Archibald | Great Britain | 40 | 1 | 112 |
| 2 | Kirsten Wild | Netherlands | 38 | 2 | 104 |
| 3 | Elisa Balsamo | Italy | 36 | 4 | 94 |
| 4 | Amalie Dideriksen | Denmark | 34 | 11 | 68 |
| 5 | Katarzyna Pawłowska | Poland | 32 | 8 | 76 |
| 6 | Andrea Waldis | Switzerland | 30 | 3 | 96 |
| 7 | Lydia Boylan | Ireland | 28 | 9 | 76 |
| 8 | Olivija Baleišytė | Lithuania | 26 | 10 | 68 |
| 9 | Saartje Vandenbroucke | Belgium | 24 | 15 | 40 |
| 10 | Laurie Berthon | France | 22 | 12 | 62 |
| 11 | Gudrun Stock | Germany | 20 | 6 | 86 |
| 12 | Aleksandra Goncharova | Russia | 18 | 5 | 92 |
| 13 | Alžbeta Bačíková | Slovakia | 16 | 14 | 40 |
| 14 | Verena Eberhardt | Austria | 14 | 16 | 36 |
| 15 | Ina Savenka | Belarus | 12 | 17 | 36 |
| 16 | Anita Stenberg | Norway | 10 | 7 | 84 |
| 17 | Jarmila Machačová | Czech Republic | 8 | 13 | 48 |
| 18 | Ana Usabiaga | Spain | 6 | 18 | 24 |
| 19 | Sara Ferrara | Finland | 4 | 20 | 8 |
| 20 | Viktoriya Bondar | Ukraine | 2 | 19 | 10 |

=== Points race and final standings ===
Riders' points from the previous 3 events were carried into the points race, in which the final standings were decided.

| Overall rank | Name | Nation | Subtotal | Sprint points | Lap points | Finish order | Final standings |
|---|---|---|---|---|---|---|---|
| 1st place, gold medalist(s) | Katie Archibald | Great Britain | 112 | 15 | 0 | 9 | 127 |
| 2nd place, silver medalist(s) | Kirsten Wild | Netherlands | 104 | 16 | 0 | 2 | 120 |
| 3rd place, bronze medalist(s) | Elisa Balsamo | Italy | 94 | 8 | 0 | 3 | 102 |
| 4 | Andrea Waldis | Switzerland | 96 | 5 | 0 | 4 | 101 |
| 5 | Aleksandra Goncharova | Russia | 92 | 6 | 0 | 15 | 98 |
| 6 | Gudrun Stock | Germany | 86 | 5 | 0 | 18 | 91 |
| 7 | Anita Stenberg | Norway | 84 | 2 | 0 | 12 | 86 |
| 8 | Lydia Boylan | Ireland | 76 | 9 | 0 | 7 | 85 |
| 9 | Katarzyna Pawłowska | Poland | 76 | 5 | 0 | 13 | 81 |
| 10 | Laurie Berthon | France | 62 | 15 | 0 | 1 | 77 |
| 11 | Amalie Dideriksen | Denmark | 68 | 8 | 0 | 6 | 76 |
| 12 | Olivija Baleišytė | Lithuania | 68 | 0 | 0 | 16 | 68 |
| 13 | Jarmila Machačová | Czech Republic | 48 | 0 | 0 | 5 | 48 |
| 14 | Alžbeta Bačíková | Slovakia | 40 | 0 | 0 | 10 | 40 |
| 15 | Saartje Vandenbroucke | Belgium | 40 | 0 | 0 | 17 | 40 |
| 16 | Verena Eberhardt | Austria | 36 | 2 | 0 | 8 | 38 |
| 17 | Ina Savenka | Belarus | 36 | 1 | 0 | 11 | 37 |
| 18 | Ana Usabiaga | Spain | 24 | 2 | –20 | 20 | 6 |
| 19 | Sara Ferrara | Finland | 8 | 0 | –40 | 19 | –32 |
| 20 | Viktoriya Bondar | Ukraine | 10 | 0 | –60 | 14 | –50 |
