= 2023 UEC European Track Championships – Women's omnium =

Women's omnium at the 2023 UEC European Track Championships
- Venue: Tissot Velodrome, Grenchen
- Date: 10 February
- Competitors: 19 from 19 nations
- Winning points: 155

Medalists
gold medal	Katie Archibald	Great Britain
silver medal	Daria Pikulik	Poland
bronze medal	Lotte Kopecky	Belgium

The women's omnium competition at the 2023 UEC European Track Championships was held on 10 February 2023.

== Results ==
=== Scratch race ===
Rank	Name	Nation	Laps down	Event points
1	Katie Archibald	Great Britain		40
2	Maike van der Duin	Netherlands		38
3	Daria Pikulik	Poland		36
4	Clara Copponi	France		34
5	Maria Martins	Portugal		32
6	Anita Stenberg	Norway		30
7	Eukene Larrarte	Spain		28
8	Olivija Baleišytė	Lithuania		26
9	Rachele Barbieri	Italy		24
10	Lea Lin Teutenberg	Germany		22
11	Lotte Kopecky	Belgium		20
12	Amalie Dideriksen	Denmark		18
13	Lara Gillespie	Ireland		16
14	Petra Ševčíková	Czech Republic		14
15	Alžbeta Bačíková	Slovakia		12
16	Kathrin Schweinberger	Austria		10
17	Michelle Andres	Switzerland		8
18	Kseniia Fedotova	Ukraine		6
19	Argiro Milaki	Greece		4

=== Tempo race ===
Rank	Name	Nation	Points in race	Event points
1	Katie Archibald	Great Britain	26	40
2	Clara Copponi	France	23	38
3	Amalie Dideriksen	Denmark	4	36
4	Lotte Kopecky	Belgium	4	34
5	Maike van der Duin	Netherlands	4	32
6	Daria Pikulik	Poland	2	30
7	Anita Stenberg	Norway	2	28
8	Rachele Barbieri	Italy	1	26
9	Lara Gillespie	Ireland	0	24
10	Lea Lin Teutenberg	Germany	0	22
11	Maria Martins	Portugal	0	20
12	Eukene Larrarte	Spain	0	18
13	Michelle Andres	Switzerland	0	16
14	Kathrin Schweinberger	Austria	0	14
15	Petra Ševčíková	Czech Republic	0	12
16	Kseniia Fedotova	Ukraine	0	10
17	Alžbeta Bačíková	Slovakia	0	8
18	Argiro Milaki	Greece	0	6
19	Olivija Baleišytė	Lithuania	0	4

=== Elimination race ===
Rank	Name	Nation	Event points
1	Katie Archibald	Great Britain	40
2	Daria Pikulik	Poland	38
3	Lotte Kopecky	Belgium	36
4	Amalie Dideriksen	Denmark	34
5	Maike van der Duin	Netherlands	32
6	Rachele Barbieri	Italy	30
7	Lea Lin Teutenberg	Germany	28
8	Olivija Baleišytė	Lithuania	26
9	Maria Martins	Portugal	24
10	Clara Copponi	France	22
11	Eukene Larrarte	Spain	20
12	Anita Stenberg	Norway	18
13	Alžbeta Bačíková	Slovakia	16
14	Michelle Andres	Switzerland	14
15	Lara Gillespie	Ireland	12
16	Argiro Milaki	Greece	10
17	Petra Ševčíková	Czech Republic	8
18	Kathrin Schweinberger	Austria	6
19	Kseniia Fedotova	Ukraine	4

=== Points race ===
Overall rank	Name	Nation	Scratch race	Tempo race	Elim. race	Subtotal	Lap points	Sprint points	Finish order	Total points
1st place, gold medalist(s)	Katie Archibald	Great Britain	40	40	40	120	20	15	11	155
2nd place, silver medalist(s)	Daria Pikulik	Poland	36	30	38	104	0	20	1	124
3rd place, bronze medalist(s)	Lotte Kopecky	Belgium	20	34	36	90	20	14	2	124
4	Amalie Dideriksen	Denmark	18	36	34	88	20	5	10	113
5	Maike van der Duin	Netherlands	38	32	32	102	0	1	16	103
6	Clara Copponi	France	34	38	22	94	0	8	3	102
7	Rachele Barbieri	Italy	24	26	30	80	0	14	4	94
8	Anita Stenberg	Norway	30	28	18	76	0	6	8	82
9	Maria Martins	Portugal	32	20	24	76	0	2	12	78
10	Lea Lin Teutenberg	Germany	22	22	28	72	0	6	18	78
11	Eukene Larrarte	Spain	28	18	20	66	0	0	13	66
12	Olivija Baleišytė	Lithuania	26	4	26	56	0	0	19	56
13	Lara Gillespie	Ireland	16	24	12	52	0	1	5	53
14	Michelle Andres	Switzerland	8	16	14	38	0	0	14	38
15	Petra Ševčíková	Czech Republic	14	12	8	34	0	2	6	36
16	Alžbeta Bačíková	Slovakia	12	8	16	36	0	0	15	36
17	Argiro Milaki	Greece	4	6	10	20	0	5	7	25
18	Kseniia Fedotova	Ukraine	6	10	4	20	0	0	17	20
19	Kathrin Schweinberger	Austria	10	14	6	30	–20	0	0	10
