= Metalnikov =

Metalnikov (Russian: Метальников) is a Russian masculine surname, its feminine counterpart is Metalnikova. It may refer to

- Budimir Metalnikov (1925–2001), Soviet screenwriter
- Inna Metalnikova (born 1991), Ukrainian track cyclist
- Leonid Metalnikov (born 1990), Kazakhstani ice hockey defenceman
