= 2018 UCI Track Cycling World Championships – Women's madison =

Women's madison at the 2018 UCI Track Cycling World Championships
- Venue: Omnisport Apeldoorn
- Location: Apeldoorn, Netherlands
- Dates: 3 March
- Competitors: 34 from 17 nations
- Teams: 17
- Winning points: 50

Medalists
gold medal	Katie Archibald; Emily Nelson	Great Britain
silver medal	Kirsten Wild; Amy Pieters	Netherlands
bronze medal	Letizia Paternoster; Maria Giulia Confalonieri	Italy

The women's madison competition at the 2018 UCI Track Cycling World Championships was held on 3 March 2018 at the Omnisport Apeldoorn in Apeldoorn, Netherlands.

== Results ==
120 laps (30km) with 12 sprints were raced.

Rank	Name	Nation	Laps points	Sprint points	Total points
1st place, gold medalist(s)	Katie Archibald; Emily Nelson	Great Britain	0	50	50
2nd place, silver medalist(s)	Kirsten Wild; Amy Pieters	Netherlands	0	35	35
3rd place, bronze medalist(s)	Letizia Paternoster; Maria Giulia Confalonieri	Italy	0	20	20
4	Amalie Dideriksen; Trine Schmidt	Denmark	0	18	18
5	Maria Novolodskaya; Olga Zabelinskaya	Russia	0	14	14
6	Sofía Arreola; Lizbeth Salazar	Mexico	−20	5	−15
7	Laurie Berthon; Coralie Demay	France	−20	1	−19
8	Ganna Solovei; Anna Nahirna	Ukraine	−20	0	−20
9	Lydia Boylan; Lydia Gurley	Ireland	−20	0	−20
10	Romy Kasper; Lisa Kullmer	Germany	−40	0	−40
11	Léna Mettraux; Aline Seitz	Switzerland	−40	0	−40
12	Jolien D'Hoore; Shari Bossuyt	Belgium	−40	0	−40
13	Michaela Drummond; Racquel Sheath	New Zealand	−60	0	−60
14	Wiktoria Pikulik; Nikol Płosaj	Poland	−60	0	−60
15	Kimberly Geist; Kimberly Ann Zubris	United States	−60	0	−60
–	Stephanie Roorda; Jasmin Duehring	Canada	−80	0	DNF
–	Yumi Kajihara; Yuya Hashimoto	Japan	−80	0	DNF
