= 2017 UEC European Track Championships – Women's madison =

Women's madison at the 2017 UEC European Track Championships
- UEC European Champion jersey
- Venue: Velodrom, Berlin
- Date: 22 October
- Competitors: 28 from 14 nations

Medalists
gold medal	Elinor Barker; Ellie Dickinson	Great Britain
silver medal	Lydia Boylan; Lydia Gurley	Ireland
bronze medal	Amy Pieters; Kirsten Wild	Netherlands

The Women's madison was held on 22 October 2017. 14 teams participated over a distance of 30 km (120 laps), with sprints every 10 laps awarding 5, 3, 2 or 1 point to the first four (double in the final sprint); 20 points are also awarded/withdrawn for each lap gained/lost respectively.

== Results ==
Rank	Name	Nation	Sprint points	Lap points	Finish order	Total points
1st place, gold medalist(s)	Elinor Barker; Ellie Dickinson	Great Britain	38	20	1	58
2nd place, silver medalist(s)	Lydia Boylan; Lydia Gurley	Ireland	10	40	5	50
3rd place, bronze medalist(s)	Amy Pieters; Kirsten Wild	Netherlands	26	20	2	46
4	Amalie Dideriksen; Trine Schmidt	Denmark	23	20	3	43
5	Maria Giulia Confalonieri; Letizia Paternoster	Italy	22	20	4	42
6	Anna Nahirna; Hanna Solovey	Ukraine	12	0	10	12
7	Laurie Berthon; Coralie Demay	France	7	0	9	7
8	Daria Pikulik; Nikol Płosaj	Poland	0	0	7	0
9	Romy Kasper; Lisa Küllmer	Germany	0	−20	6	−20
10	Aline Seitz; Andrea Waldis	Switzerland	0	−20	8	−20
11	Lucie Hochmann; Ema Kankovská	Czech Republic	0	−40	11	−40
12	Palina Pivavarava; Ina Savenka	Belarus	0	−40	12	−40
	Gilke Croket; Saartje Vandenbroucke	Belgium	0	−60	–	DNF
	Maria Averina; Galina Streltsova	Russia	0	−60	–	DNF
