= 2019 UEC European Track Championships – Women's individual pursuit =

Women's individual pursuit at the 2019 UEC European Track Championships
- Venue: Omnisport Apeldoorn, Apeldoorn
- Date: 18 October
- Competitors: 16 from 10 nations
- Winning time: 3:25.002

Medalists
| gold medal | Franziska Brauße | Germany |
| silver medal | Lisa Brennauer | Germany |
| bronze medal | Katie Archibald | Great Britain |

The women's individual pursuit competition at the 2019 UEC European Track Championships was held on 18 October 2019.

== Results ==
=== Qualifying ===
The first two racers raced for gold, the third and fourth fastest rider raced for the bronze medal.

| Rank | Name | Nation | Time | Behind | Notes |
|---|---|---|---|---|---|
| 1 | Lisa Brennauer | Germany | 3:23.401 | | QG |
| 2 | Franziska Brauße | Germany | 3:26.159 | +2.758 | QG |
| 3 | Katie Archibald | Great Britain | 3:27.807 | +4.406 | QB |
| 4 | Kelly Murphy | Ireland | 3:30.687 | +7.286 | QB |
| 5 | Silvia Valsecchi | Italy | 3:31.990 | +8.589 | |
| 6 | Tamara Dronova | Russia | 3:32.934 | +9.533 | |
| 7 | Elinor Barker | Great Britain | 3:33.443 | +10.042 | |
| 8 | Coralie Demay | France | 3:33.463 | +10.062 | |
| 9 | Martina Alzini | Italy | 3:34.562 | +11.161 | |
| 10 | Lara Gillespie | Ireland | 3:38.277 | +14.876 | |
| 11 | Ina Savenka | Belarus | 3:39.382 | +15.981 | |
| 12 | Hanna Solovey | Ukraine | 3:40.395 | +16.994 | |
| 13 | Anna Nahirna | Ukraine | 3:40.628 | +17.227 | |
| 14 | Andrea Waldis | Switzerland | 3:41.473 | +18.072 | |
| 15 | Léna Mettraux | Switzerland | 3:45.330 | +21.929 | |
| 16 | Tereza Medveďová | Slovakia | 3:45.964 | +22.563 | |

=== Finals ===
| Rank | Name | Nation | Time | Behind | Notes |
|---|---|---|---|---|---|
Gold medal final
| 1st place, gold medalist(s) | Franziska Brauße | Germany | 3:25.002 | | |
| 2nd place, silver medalist(s) | Lisa Brennauer | Germany | 3:26.190 | +1.188 | |
Bronze medal final
| 3rd place, bronze medalist(s) | Katie Archibald | Great Britain | 3:31.602 | | |
| 4 | Kelly Murphy | Ireland | 3:32.925 | +1.323 | |
