= 2016 UEC European Track Championships – Women's elimination race =

Women's elimination race at the 2016 UEC European Track Championships
- UEC European Champion jersey
- Venue: Vélodrome de Saint-Quentin-en-Yvelines, Yvelines
- Date: 19 October
- Competitors: 17 from 17 nations

Medalists
gold medal	Kirsten Wild	Netherlands
silver medal	Katie Archibald	Great Britain
bronze medal	Laurie Berthon	France

The Women's elimination race was held on 19 October 2016.

== Results ==
Rank	Name	Nation
1st place, gold medalist(s)	Kirsten Wild	Netherlands
2nd place, silver medalist(s)	Katie Archibald	Great Britain
3rd place, bronze medalist(s)	Laurie Berthon	France
4	Lucie Hochmann	Czech Republic
5	Olivija Baleisyte	Lithuania
6	Katarzyna Pawłowska	Poland
7	Evgenia Romanyuta	Russia
8	Maryna Shmayankova	Belarus
9	Johanna Kitti Borissza	Hungary
10	Michaela Ebert	Germany
11	Alžbeta Pavlendová	Slovakia
12	Simona Frapporti	Italy
13	Ana Usabiaga	Spain
14	Tetyana Klimchenko	Ukraine
15	Lydia Gurley	Ireland
16	Kaat Van der Meulen	Belgium
17	Sara Ferrara	Finland
