= 2019 UCI Track Cycling World Championships – Women's omnium =

Women's omnium at the 2019 UCI Track Cycling World Championships
- Venue: BGŻ Arena
- Location: Pruszków, Poland
- Dates: 1 March
- Competitors: 24 from 24 nations
- Winning points: 117

Medalists
gold medal	Kirsten Wild	Netherlands
silver medal	Letizia Paternoster	Italy
bronze medal	Jennifer Valente	United States

The Women's omnium competition at the 2019 UCI Track Cycling World Championships was held on 1 March 2019.

== Results ==
=== Scratch race ===
The race was started at 15:00.

Rank	Name	Nation	Laps down	Event points
1	Letizia Paternoster	Italy		40
2	Annette Edmondson	Australia		38
3	Jennifer Valente	United States		36
4	Kirsten Wild	Netherlands		34
5	Shannon McCurley	Ireland		32
6	Yumi Kajihara	Japan		30
7	Allison Beveridge	Canada		28
8	Daria Pikulik	Poland		26
9	Amalie Dideriksen	Denmark		24
10	Maria Martins	Portugal		22
11	Katie Archibald	Great Britain		20
12	Laurie Berthon	France		18
13	Rushlee Buchanan	New Zealand		16
14	Andrea Waldis	Switzerland		14
15	Lizbeth Salazar	Mexico		12
16	Ina Savenka	Belarus		10
17	Huang Ting-ying	Chinese Taipei		8
18	Wang Xiaofei	China		6
19	Aleksandra Goncharova	Russia		4
20	Ana Usabiaga	Spain		2
21	Alžbeta Bačíková	Slovakia		1
22	Anita Stenberg	Norway		1
23	Lotte Kopecky	Belgium		1
24	Olivija Baleišytė	Lithuania		1

=== Tempo race ===
The race was started at 17:04.

Rank	Name	Nation	Lap points	Total points	Event points
1	Yumi Kajihara	Japan	20	24	40
2	Rushlee Buchanan	New Zealand	20	21	38
3	Ina Savenka	Belarus	20	21	36
4	Amalie Dideriksen	Denmark	20	20	34
5	Allison Beveridge	Canada		9	32
6	Kirsten Wild	Netherlands		3	30
7	Letizia Paternoster	Italy		2	28
8	Katie Archibald	Great Britain		2	26
9	Daria Pikulik	Poland		1	24
10	Annette Edmondson	Australia		1	22
11	Anita Stenberg	Norway		1	20
12	Shannon McCurley	Ireland		0	18
13	Jennifer Valente	United States		0	16
14	Lizbeth Salazar	Mexico		0	14
15	Wang Xiaofei	China		0	12
16	Lotte Kopecky	Belgium		0	10
17	Maria Martins	Portugal		0	8
18	Andrea Waldis	Switzerland		0	6
19	Ana Usabiaga	Spain		0	4
20	Laurie Berthon	France		0	2
21	Olivija Baleišytė	Lithuania		0	1
22	Alžbeta Bačíková	Slovakia		0	1
23	Huang Ting-ying	Chinese Taipei		0	1
24	Aleksandra Goncharova	Russia		0	1

=== Elimination race ===
The elimination race was started at 19:30.

Rank	Name	Nation	Event points
1	Jennifer Valente	United States	40
2	Kirsten Wild	Netherlands	38
3	Letizia Paternoster	Italy	36
4	Lizbeth Salazar	Mexico	34
5	Amalie Dideriksen	Denmark	32
6	Laurie Berthon	France	30
7	Yumi Kajihara	Japan	28
8	Andrea Waldis	Switzerland	26
9	Katie Archibald	Great Britain	24
10	Anita Stenberg	Norway	22
11	Alžbeta Bačíková	Slovakia	20
12	Wang Xiaofei	China	18
13	Maria Martins	Portugal	16
14	Annette Edmondson	Australia	14
15	Allison Beveridge	Canada	12
16	Daria Pikulik	Poland	10
17	Shannon McCurley	Ireland	8
18	Rushlee Buchanan	New Zealand	6
19	Olivija Baleišytė	Lithuania	4
20	Ana Usabiaga	Spain	2
21	Huang Ting-ying	Chinese Taipei	1
22	Lotte Kopecky	Belgium	1
23	Aleksandra Goncharova	Russia	1
24	Ina Savenka	Belarus	1

=== Points race and overall standings ===
The points race was started at 20:55.

Rank	Name	Nation	Lap points	Sprint points	Total points
1st place, gold medalist(s)	Kirsten Wild	Netherlands	0	15	117
2nd place, silver medalist(s)	Letizia Paternoster	Italy	0	11	115
3rd place, bronze medalist(s)	Jennifer Valente	United States	0	14	106
4	Yumi Kajihara	Japan	0	8	106
5	Annette Edmondson	Australia	20	7	101
6	Amalie Dideriksen	Denmark	0	10	100
7	Katie Archibald	Great Britain	0	14	84
8	Allison Beveridge	Canada	0	1	73
9	Rushlee Buchanan	New Zealand	0	6	66
10	Daria Pikulik	Poland	0	3	63
11	Lizbeth Salazar	Mexico	0	0	60
12	Shannon McCurley	Ireland	0	0	58
13	Laurie Berthon	France	0	0	50
14	Maria Martins	Portugal	0	3	49
15	Anita Stenberg	Norway	0	5	48
16	Andrea Waldis	Switzerland	0	2	48
17	Ina Savenka	Belarus	0	0	47
18	Wang Xiaofei	China	0	0	36
19	Lotte Kopecky	Belgium	0	0	12
20	Huang Ting-ying	Chinese Taipei	0	0	10
21	Ana Usabiaga	Spain	0	0	8
22	Olivija Baleišytė	Lithuania	0	0	6
23	Aleksandra Goncharova	Russia	0	0	6
24	Alžbeta Bačíková	Slovakia	−40	0	−18
