= Hanna Laptsionak =

Belarusian cyclist

Personal information
- Born: 16 December 1990 (age 35)

Cycling career
- Sport: Cycling
- Discipline: Track cycling

Hanna Laptsionak (born 16 December 1990) is a Belarusian female track cyclist, representing Belarus at international competitions. She competed at the 2016 UEC European Track Championships in the individual pursuit event and team pursuit event.
