= Cycling at the 2014 Commonwealth Games – Women's points race =

Cycling Track – Women's points race at the 2014 Commonwealth Games
- Venue: Sir Chris Hoy Velodrome
- Dates: 27 July 2014
- Competitors: 22 from 10 nations

Medalists
gold medal	Laura Trott	England
silver medal	Elinor Barker	Wales
bronze medal	Katie Archibald	Scotland

The Women's points race at the 2014 Commonwealth Games, as part of the cycling programme, took place on 27 July 2014.

== Results ==
=== Finals ===
Rank	Name	Sprint Number								Lap Points			Total Score
Rank	Name	1	2	3	4	5	6	7	8	+	-	Balance	Total Score
1st place, gold medalist(s)	Laura Trott (ENG)	1		5		2	1		5	20		20	37
2nd place, silver medalist(s)	Elinor Barker (WAL)		5				5			20		20	37
3rd place, bronze medalist(s)	Katie Archibald (SCO)			3		3				20		20	33
4	Amy Cure (AUS)					5		3	1	20		20	32
5	Rushlee Buchanan (NZL)	2	2		2	1				20		20	28
6	Jasmin Glaesser (CAN)						3	5		20		20	28
7	Dani King (ENG)			2				2		20		20	25
8	Lauren Ellis (NZL)		3				2			20		20	25
9	Annette Edmondson (AUS)	5			5								10
10	Laura Brown (CAN)				3				3				6
11	Melissa Hoskins (AUS)	3	1										4
12	Jupha Somnet (MAS)								2				2
13	Stephanie Roorda (CAN)			1									1
14	Georgia Williams (NZL)				1								1
15	Amy Roberts (WAL)							1					1
16	Lydia Helene Boylan (NIR)												0
17	Joanna Rowsell (ENG)												0
18	Eileen Roe (SCO)												0
19	Charline Joiner (SCO)												0
20	Hayley Jones (WAL)												0
−	Tamiko Butler (ANT)										40	-40	DNF
−	Sunita Yanglem (IND)										20	-20	DNF
