= 2021 UCI Track Cycling World Championships – Women's omnium =

Track Cycling World Championship

Women's omnium at the 2021 UCI Track Cycling World Championships
- Venue: Vélodrome Couvert Régional Jean Stablinski
- Location: Roubaix, France
- Dates: 22 October
- Competitors: 29 from 29 nations
- Winning points: 137

Medalists
| gold medal | Katie Archibald | Great Britain |
| silver medal | Lotte Kopecky | Belgium |
| bronze medal | Elisa Balsamo | Italy |

The Women's omnium competition at the 2021 UCI Track Cycling World Championships was held on 22 October 2021.

== Qualifying ==
The first 12 riders in each heat advance.

=== Heat 1 ===
The race was started at 13:00.

| Rank | Name | Nation | Lap points | Sprint points | Total points | Notes |
|---|---|---|---|---|---|---|
| 1 | Clara Copponi | France | 20 | 5 | 25 | Q |
| 2 | Hanna Tserakh | Belarus | 0 | 11 | 11 | Q |
| 3 | Olivija Baleišytė | Lithuania | 0 | 9 | 9 | Q |
| 4 | Hanna Solovey | Ukraine | 0 | 8 | 8 | Q |
| 5 | Lotte Kopecky | Belgium | 0 | 7 | 7 | Q |
| 6 | Ally Wollaston | New Zealand | 0 | 6 | 6 | Q |
| 7 | Amalie Dideriksen | Denmark | 0 | 6 | 6 | Q |
| 8 | Anita Stenberg | Norway | 0 | 5 | 5 | Q |
| 9 | Katie Archibald | Great Britain | 0 | 5 | 5 | Q |
| 10 | Yumi Kajihara | Japan | 0 | 5 | 5 | Q |
| 11 | Eukene Larrarte | Spain | 0 | 4 | 4 | Q |
| 12 | Gulnaz Khatuntseva | Russian Cycling Federation | 0 | 3 | 3 | Q |
| 13 | Lea Lin Teutenberg | Germany | 0 | 3 | 3 | |
| 14 | Amber Joseph | Barbados | 0 | 3 | 3 | |
| 15 | Fanny Cauchois | Laos | −40 | 0 | −40 | |

=== Heat 2 ===
The race was started at 13:23.

| Rank | Name | Nation | Lap points | Sprint points | Total points | Notes |
|---|---|---|---|---|---|---|
| 1 | Rinata Sultanova | Kazakhstan | 20 | 3 | 23 | Q |
| 2 | Maike van der Duin | Netherlands | 20 | 3 | 23 | Q |
| 3 | Ngaire Barraclough | Canada | 20 | 2 | 22 | Q |
| 4 | Verena Eberhardt | Austria | 20 | 0 | 20 | Q |
| 5 | Nikol Płosaj | Poland | 0 | 14 | 14 | Q |
| 6 | Jennifer Valente | United States | 0 | 10 | 10 | Q |
| 7 | Alžbeta Bačíková | Slovakia | 0 | 9 | 9 | Q |
| 8 | Elisa Balsamo | Italy | 0 | 8 | 8 | Q |
| 9 | Maria Martins | Portugal | 0 | 7 | 7 | Q |
| 10 | Petra Ševčíková | Czech Republic | 0 | 6 | 6 | Q |
| 11 | Aline Seitz | Switzerland | 0 | 6 | 6 | Q |
| 12 | Victoria Velasco | Mexico | 0 | 5 | 5 | Q |
| 13 | Annette Edmondson | Australia | 0 | 3 | 3 | |
| 14 | Lina Hernández | Colombia | 0 | 1 | 1 | |

== Results ==
=== Scratch race ===
The race was started at 14:19.

| Rank | Name | Nation | Laps down | Event points |
|---|---|---|---|---|
| 1 | Katie Archibald | Great Britain | | 40 |
| 2 | Jennifer Valente | United States | | 38 |
| 3 | Clara Copponi | France | | 36 |
| 4 | Olivija Baleišytė | Lithuania | | 34 |
| 5 | Maria Martins | Portugal | | 32 |
| 6 | Elisa Balsamo | Italy | | 30 |
| 7 | Petra Ševčíková | Czech Republic | | 28 |
| 8 | Maike van der Duin | Netherlands | | 26 |
| 9 | Amalie Dideriksen | Denmark | | 24 |
| 10 | Rinata Sultanova | Kazakhstan | | 22 |
| 11 | Ally Wollaston | New Zealand | | 20 |
| 12 | Yumi Kajihara | Japan | | 18 |
| 13 | Nikol Płosaj | Poland | | 16 |
| 14 | Eukene Larrarte | Spain | | 14 |
| 15 | Hanna Tserakh | Belarus | | 12 |
| 16 | Aline Seitz | Switzerland | | 10 |
| 17 | Gulnaz Khatuntseva | Russian Cycling Federation | | 8 |
| 18 | Alžbeta Bačíková | Slovakia | | 6 |
| 19 | Verena Eberhardt | Austria | | 4 |
| 20 | Ngaire Barraclough | Canada | | 2 |
| 21 | Anita Stenberg | Norway | | 1 |
| 22 | Lotte Kopecky | Belgium | | 1 |
| 23 | Hanna Solovey | Ukraine | | 1 |
| 24 | Victoria Velasco | Mexico | | 1 |

=== Tempo race ===
The race was started at 14:19.

| Rank | Name | Nation | Lap points | Sprint points | Total points | Event points |
|---|---|---|---|---|---|---|
| 1 | Katie Archibald | Great Britain | 20 | 14 | 34 | 40 |
| 2 | Hanna Solovey | Ukraine | 20 | 4 | 24 | 38 |
| 3 | Lotte Kopecky | Belgium | 20 | 1 | 21 | 36 |
| 4 | Hanna Tserakh | Belarus | 20 | 0 | 20 | 34 |
| 5 | Elisa Balsamo | Italy | 0 | 2 | 2 | 32 |
| 6 | Nikol Płosaj | Poland | 0 | 2 | 2 | 30 |
| 7 | Amalie Dideriksen | Denmark | 0 | 1 | 1 | 28 |
| 8 | Jennifer Valente | United States | 0 | 1 | 1 | 26 |
| 9 | Olivija Baleišytė | Lithuania | 0 | 1 | 1 | 24 |
| 10 | Clara Copponi | France | 0 | 0 | 0 | 22 |
| 11 | Maria Martins | Portugal | 0 | 0 | 0 | 20 |
| 12 | Eukene Larrarte | Spain | 0 | 0 | 0 | 18 |
| 13 | Maike van der Duin | Netherlands | 0 | 0 | 0 | 16 |
| 14 | Petra Ševčíková | Czech Republic | 0 | 0 | 0 | 14 |
| 15 | Gulnaz Khatuntseva | Russian Cycling Federation | 0 | 0 | 0 | 12 |
| 16 | Ngaire Barraclough | Canada | 0 | 0 | 0 | 10 |
| 17 | Ally Wollaston | New Zealand | 0 | 0 | 0 | 8 |
| 18 | Verena Eberhardt | Austria | 0 | 0 | 0 | 6 |
| 19 | Aline Seitz | Switzerland | 0 | 0 | 0 | 4 |
| 20 | Anita Stenberg | Norway | 0 | 0 | 0 | 2 |
| 21 | Rinata Sultanova | Kazakhstan | 0 | 0 | 0 | 1 |
| 22 | Yumi Kajihara | Japan | 0 | 0 | 0 | 1 |
| 23 | Victoria Velasco | Mexico | 0 | 0 | 0 | 1 |
| 24 | Alžbeta Bačíková | Slovakia | −20 | 0 | −20 | 1 |

=== Elimination race ===
The race was started at 19:34.

| Rank | Name | Nation | Event points |
|---|---|---|---|
| 1 | Katie Archibald | Great Britain | 40 |
| 2 | Elisa Balsamo | Italy | 38 |
| 3 | Clara Copponi | France | 36 |
| 4 | Lotte Kopecky | Belgium | 34 |
| 5 | Jennifer Valente | United States | 32 |
| 6 | Maria Martins | Portugal | 30 |
| 7 | Olivija Baleišytė | Lithuania | 28 |
| 8 | Maike van der Duin | Netherlands | 26 |
| 9 | Eukene Larrarte | Spain | 24 |
| 10 | Verena Eberhardt | Austria | 22 |
| 11 | Amalie Dideriksen | Denmark | 20 |
| 12 | Alžbeta Bačíková | Slovakia | 18 |
| 13 | Ally Wollaston | New Zealand | 16 |
| 14 | Aline Seitz | Switzerland | 14 |
| 15 | Petra Ševčíková | Czech Republic | 12 |
| 16 | Nikol Płosaj | Poland | 10 |
| 17 | Hanna Solovey | Ukraine | 8 |
| 18 | Gulnaz Khatuntseva | Russian Cycling Federation | 6 |
| 19 | Rinata Sultanova | Kazakhstan | 4 |
| 20 | Yumi Kajihara | Japan | 2 |
| 21 | Ngaire Barraclough | Canada | 1 |
| 22 | Victoria Velasco | Mexico | 1 |
| 23 | Hanna Tserakh | Belarus | 1 |
| 24 | Anita Stenberg | Norway | 1 |

=== Points race and overall standings ===
The points race was started at 21:01.

| Rank | Name | Nation | Lap points | Sprint points | Total points |
|---|---|---|---|---|---|
| 1st place, gold medalist(s) | Katie Archibald | Great Britain | 0 | 17 | 137 |
| 2nd place, silver medalist(s) | Lotte Kopecky | Belgium | 40 | 8 | 119 |
| 3rd place, bronze medalist(s) | Elisa Balsamo | Italy | 0 | 16 | 116 |
| 4 | Clara Copponi | France | 0 | 19 | 113 |
| 5 | Maria Martins | Portugal | 20 | 4 | 106 |
| 6 | Jennifer Valente | United States | 0 | 3 | 99 |
| 7 | Amalie Dideriksen | Denmark | 20 | 7 | 99 |
| 8 | Olivija Baleišytė | Lithuania | 0 | 0 | 86 |
| 9 | Maike van der Duin | Netherlands | 0 | 5 | 73 |
| 10 | Ally Wollaston | New Zealand | 20 | 4 | 68 |
| 11 | Nikol Płosaj | Poland | 0 | 7 | 63 |
| 12 | Eukene Larrarte | Spain | 0 | 0 | 56 |
| 13 | Hanna Solovey | Ukraine | 0 | 1 | 48 |
| 14 | Hanna Tserakh | Belarus | 0 | 0 | 47 |
| 15 | Yumi Kajihara | Japan | 20 | 4 | 45 |
| 16 | Verena Eberhardt | Austria | 0 | 1 | 33 |
| 17 | Aline Seitz | Switzerland | 0 | 0 | 28 |
| 18 | Rinata Sultanova | Kazakhstan | 0 | 0 | 27 |
| 19 | Petra Ševčíková | Czech Republic | −40 | 0 | 14 |
| 20 | Victoria Velasco | Mexico | 0 | 3 | 6 |
| 21 | Anita Stenberg | Norway | 0 | 0 | 4 |
| 22 | Alžbeta Bačíková | Slovakia | −60 | 0 | −35 |
| – | Ngaire Barraclough | Canada | Did not finish | | |
| – | Gulnaz Khatuntseva | Russian Cycling Federation | Did not finish | | |
