= 2016 UEC European Track Championships – Women's individual pursuit =

Women's individual pursuit at the 2016 UEC European Track Championships
- UEC European Champion jersey
- Venue: Vélodrome de Saint-Quentin-en-Yvelines, Yvelines
- Date: 21 October
- Competitors: 21 from 14 nations

Medalists
gold medal	Katie Archibald	Great Britain
silver medal	Justyna Kaczkowska	Poland
bronze medal	Anna Turvey	Ireland

The Women's individual pursuit was held on 21 October 2016.

== Results ==
=== Qualifying ===
The fastest 4 competitors qualify for the medal finals.

Rank	Name	Nation	Time	Notes
1	Katie Archibald	Great Britain	3:28.345	QG
2	Justyna Kaczkowska	Poland	3:31.736	QG
3	Anna Turvey	Ireland	3:36.017	QB
4	Ina Savenka	Belarus	3:37.658	QB
5	Élise Delzenne	France	3:38.048	
6	Lotte Kopecky	Belgium	3:38.575	
7	Gudrun Stock	Germany	3:39.300	
8	Francesca Pattaro	Italy	3:39.428	
9	Sheyla Gutiérrez	Spain	3:39.589	
10	Gloria Rodríguez	Spain	3:40.574	
11	Lucie Hochmann	Czech Republic	3:41.013	
12	Anna Nahirna	Ukraine	3:41.485	
13	Coralie Demay	France	3:41.672	
14	Hanna Laptsionak	Belarus	3:41.874	
15	Edita Mazurevičiūtė	Lithuania	3:43.473	
16	Manon Lloyd	Great Britain	3:44.112	
17	Olivija Baleisyte	Lithuania	3:44.921	
18	Pia Pensaari	Finland	3:44.946	
19	Anastasiia Iakovenko	Russia	3:45.548	
20	Annelies Dom	Belgium	3:47.912	
21	Eileen Burns	Ireland	3:50.618	

- QG = qualified for gold medal final
- QB = qualified for bronze medal final

=== Finals ===
The final classification is determined in the medal finals.

Rank	Name	Nation	Time	Notes
Bronze medal final
3rd place, bronze medalist(s)	Anna Turvey	Ireland	3:36.591	
4	Ina Savenka	Belarus	3:37.978	
Gold medal final
1st place, gold medalist(s)	Katie Archibald	Great Britain	3:29.878	
2nd place, silver medalist(s)	Justyna Kaczkowska	Poland	3:33.188	
