= Katie Archibald =

Scottish racing cyclist (born 1994)

Katie Archibald MBE
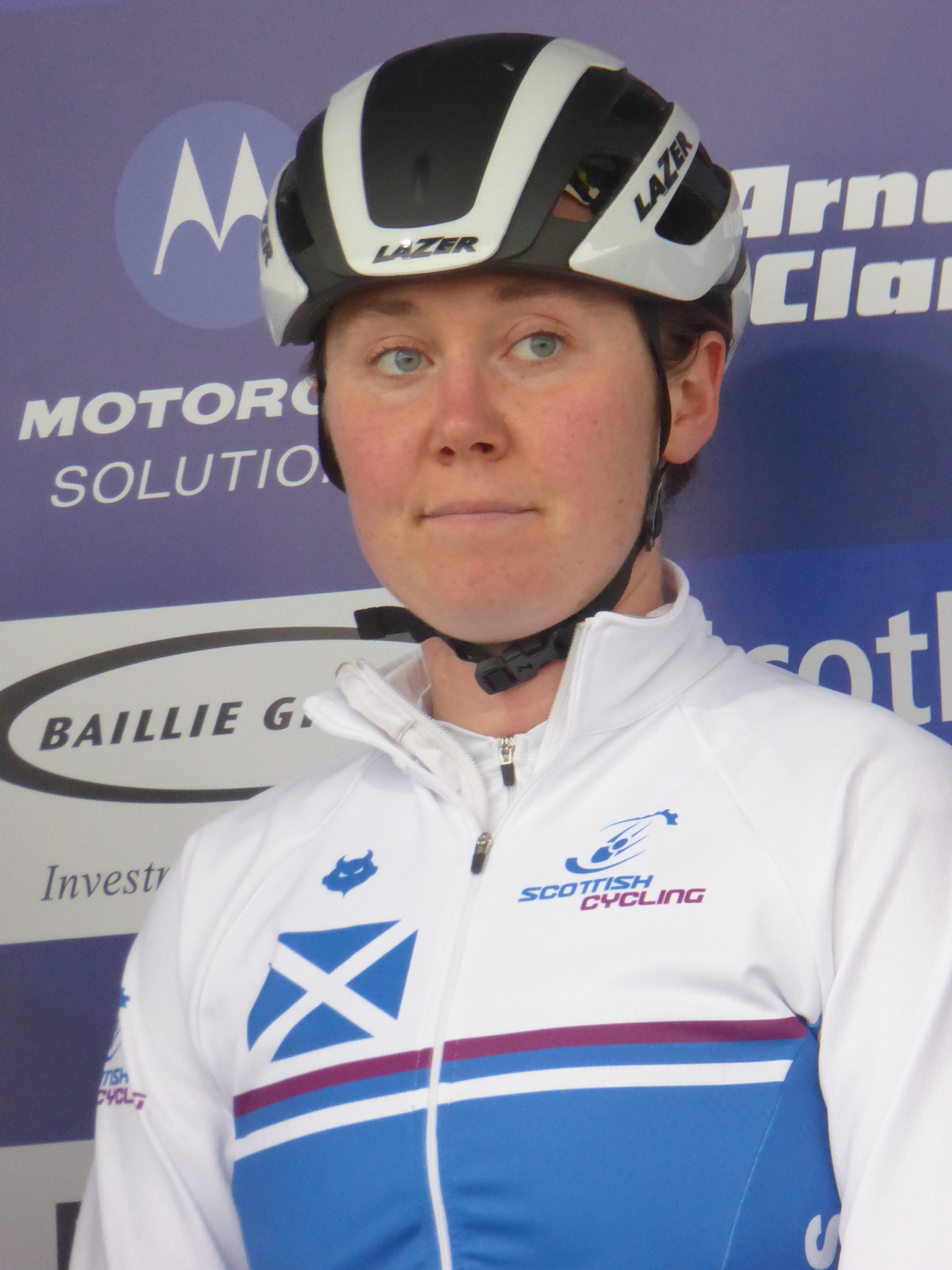
- Archibald at the 2019 Women's Tour of Scotland

Personal information
- Born: 12 March 1994 (age 32) Chertsey, Surrey, England
- Height: 1.78 m (5 ft 10 in)
- Weight: 67 kg (148 lb)

Cycling career
- Sport: Cycling
- Disciplines: Track; Road
- Role: Rider
- Rider type: Pursuitist (track); Time trialist (road)

Amateur teams
- Team Thomsons Cycles
- City of Edinburgh Racing Club

Professional teams
- 2014–2016: Madison–Boot Out Breast Cancer Care
- 2017: Team WNT
- 2018: Wiggle High5
- 2022–2024: Ceratizit–WNT Pro Cycling

Major wins
- Track Olympic Games Madison (2020) Team pursuit (2016) World Championships Omnium (2017, 2021) Madison (2018, 2025) Team pursuit (2014, 2023, 2024)
Medal record
Event	1st	2nd	3rd
Olympic Games	2	1	0
World Championships	7	7	3
European Championships	21	6	1
Commonwealth Games	1	1	1
Total	31	15	5
Women's track cycling
Representing Great Britain
Olympic Games
Gold medal – first place	2016 Rio de Janeiro	Team pursuit
Gold medal – first place	2020 Tokyo	Madison
Silver medal – second place	2020 Tokyo	Team pursuit
World Championships
Gold medal – first place	2014 Cali	Team pursuit
Gold medal – first place	2017 Hong Kong	Omnium
Gold medal – first place	2018 Apeldoorn	Madison
Gold medal – first place	2021 Roubaix	Omnium
Gold medal – first place	2023 Glasgow	Team pursuit
Gold medal – first place	2024 Ballerup	Team pursuit
Gold medal – first place	2025 Santiago	Madison
Silver medal – second place	2015 Yvelines	Team pursuit
Silver medal – second place	2018 Apeldoorn	Team pursuit
Silver medal – second place	2019 Pruszków	Team pursuit
Silver medal – second place	2020 Berlin	Team pursuit
Silver medal – second place	2021 Roubaix	Points race
Silver medal – second place	2022 Saint-Quentin-en-Yvelines	Team pursuit
Silver medal – second place	2025 Santiago	Elimination race
Bronze medal – third place	2021 Roubaix	Madison
Bronze medal – third place	2021 Roubaix	Team pursuit
Bronze medal – third place	2024 Ballerup	Madison
European Championships
Gold medal – first place	2013 Apeldoorn	Team pursuit
Gold medal – first place	2014 Guadeloupe	Individual pursuit
Gold medal – first place	2014 Guadeloupe	Team pursuit
Gold medal – first place	2015 Grenchen	Individual pursuit
Gold medal – first place	2015 Grenchen	Elimination
Gold medal – first place	2015 Grenchen	Team pursuit
Gold medal – first place	2016 Yvelines	Individual pursuit
Gold medal – first place	2016 Yvelines	Omnium
Gold medal – first place	2017 Berlin	Individual pursuit
Gold medal – first place	2017 Berlin	Omnium
Gold medal – first place	2018 Glasgow	Team pursuit
Gold medal – first place	2019 Apeldoorn	Team pursuit
Gold medal – first place	2020 Plovdiv	Points race
Gold medal – first place	2020 Plovdiv	Team pursuit
Gold medal – first place	2021 Grenchen	Scratch
Gold medal – first place	2021 Grenchen	Omnium
Gold medal – first place	2021 Grenchen	Madison
Gold medal – first place	2023 Grenchen	Omnium
Gold medal – first place	2023 Grenchen	Madison
Gold medal – first place	2023 Grenchen	Team pursuit
Gold medal – first place	2026 Konya	Team pursuit
Silver medal – second place	2016 Yvelines	Elimination
Silver medal – second place	2017 Berlin	Team pursuit
Silver medal – second place	2018 Glasgow	Individual pursuit
Silver medal – second place	2018 Glasgow	Omnium
Silver medal – second place	2019 Apeldoorn	Madison
Silver medal – second place	2026 Konya	Madison
Bronze medal – third place	2019 Apeldoorn	Individual pursuit
European U23 Championships
Silver medal – second place	2015 Athens	Individual pursuit
Representing Scotland
Commonwealth Games
Gold medal – first place	2018 Gold Coast	Individual pursuit
Silver medal – second place	2018 Gold Coast	Points race
Bronze medal – third place	2014 Glasgow	Points race

Katie Archibald (born 12 March 1994) is a former elite racing cyclist, specialising in endurance track cycling events in which she represented Great Britain and Scotland.

A member of the Great Britain 2016 Olympic champion and 2020 Olympic silver medallists team in women's team pursuit, she was a champion in the same event at both the World (2014, 2023, 2024) and European (2013, 2014, 2015, 2018, 2019, 2020, 2023 and 2026) championships and current world record holder. She won her second Olympic gold medal in the inaugural women's Madison race at the 2020 Olympic Games in Tokyo with her partner, Laura Kenny.

Individually, Archibald has been European champion in the elimination race in 2015, four times in the omnium in 2016, 2017, 2021 and 2023, in the scratch race in 2021, the women's Madison twice in 2021 and 2023 and a four time European champion in the individual pursuit between 2014 and 2017. In 2017 she secured her first individual global title, winning the Omnium at the 2017 UCI Track Cycling World Championships and won a third world championship the following year when partnering Emily Nelson to win the Madison at the 2018 UCI Track Cycling World Championships. In 2021 she won her second individual world title, with a second world Omnium title.

Archibald's 21 gold medals in European elite track championships is an all-time record for that championships.

On 12 May 2026, Archibald announced her retirement from the sport, despite having been previously selected to represent Scotland at the 2026 Commonwealth Games. She confirmed that following the end of her cycling career, she was in training to qualify as a nurse.

== Early life and career ==
Archibald was privately educated at The Glasgow Academy. She has a sporting background in swimming and took up cycling relatively late, taking it up competitively in 2011 on the grass track and in 2012 on hard track.

After spending 2012–2013 working in the family business (Archers Sleepcentre) as a telesales operator, she was recruited into British Cycling's Olympic Development Academy in November 2013.

=== Track ===
Archibald made her Great Britain debut at the 2013 European Track Championships. Alongside Laura Trott, Dani King and Elinor Barker, she won the gold medal and broke the world record twice in the team pursuit.

At the 2013–14 Track World Cup first round in Manchester, while riding for the Scottish Braveheart team, Archibald claimed silver in the scratch race and bronze in the points race. Recalled to the Great Britain team for the 2013–14 Track World Cup second round in Aguascalientes, Archibald was part of the quartet that won gold and broke the world record again in the team pursuit competition.

She then became Scotland's first female track cycling world champion, when she was part of the team that won the team pursuit title at the 2014 World Track Championships. Archibald won the gold medal in the same event, and another in the individual pursuit, at the 2014 European Track Championships. Archibald represented Scotland at the Commonwealth Games in Glasgow, 2014, as she claimed a bronze medal in the points race.

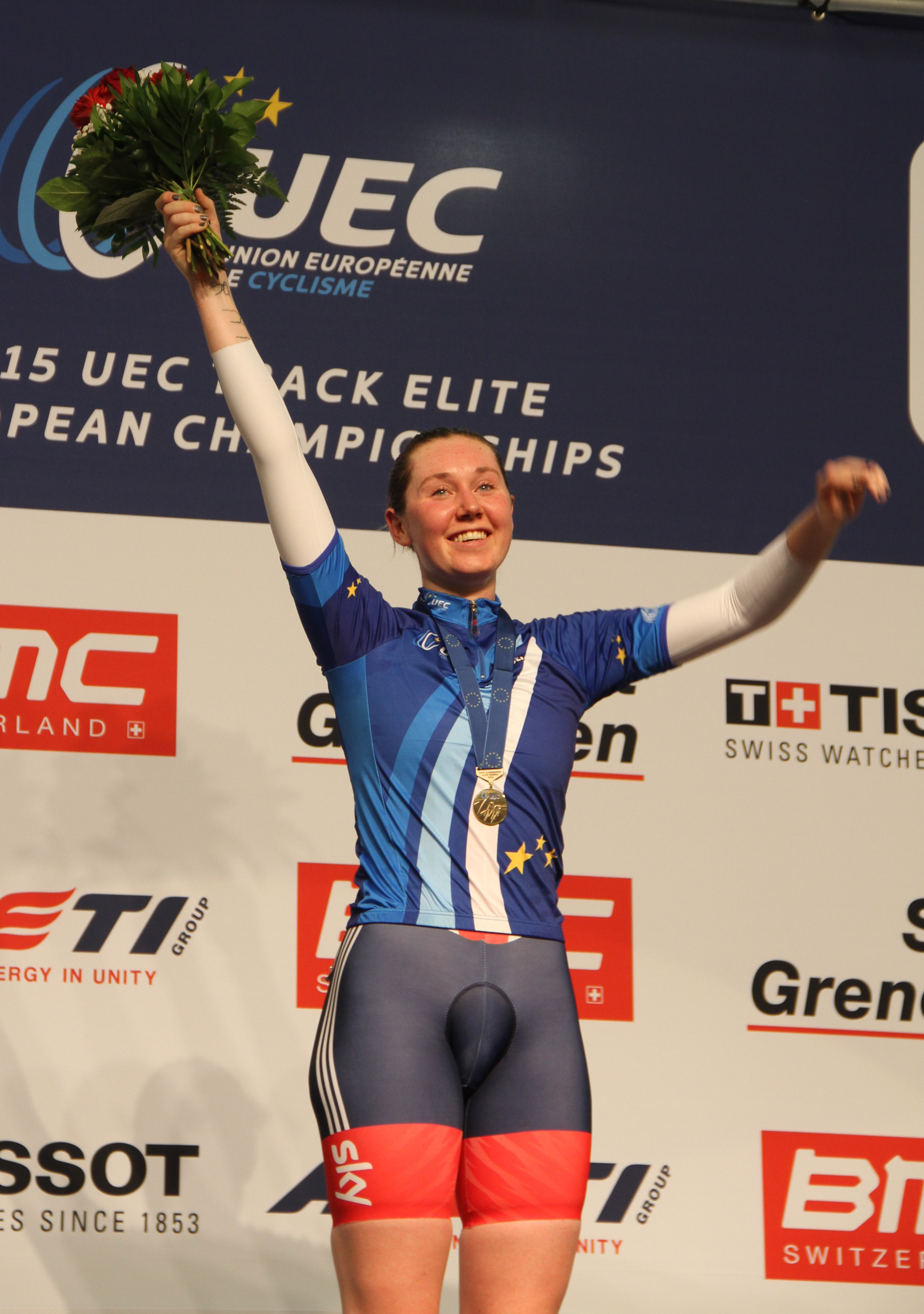
Archibald at the 2015 UEC European Track Championships, where she won three gold medals.

At the 2015 European Track Championships, Archibald became a triple European champion, retaining the team pursuit and individual pursuit titles she won in 2014, while adding the elimination race title.

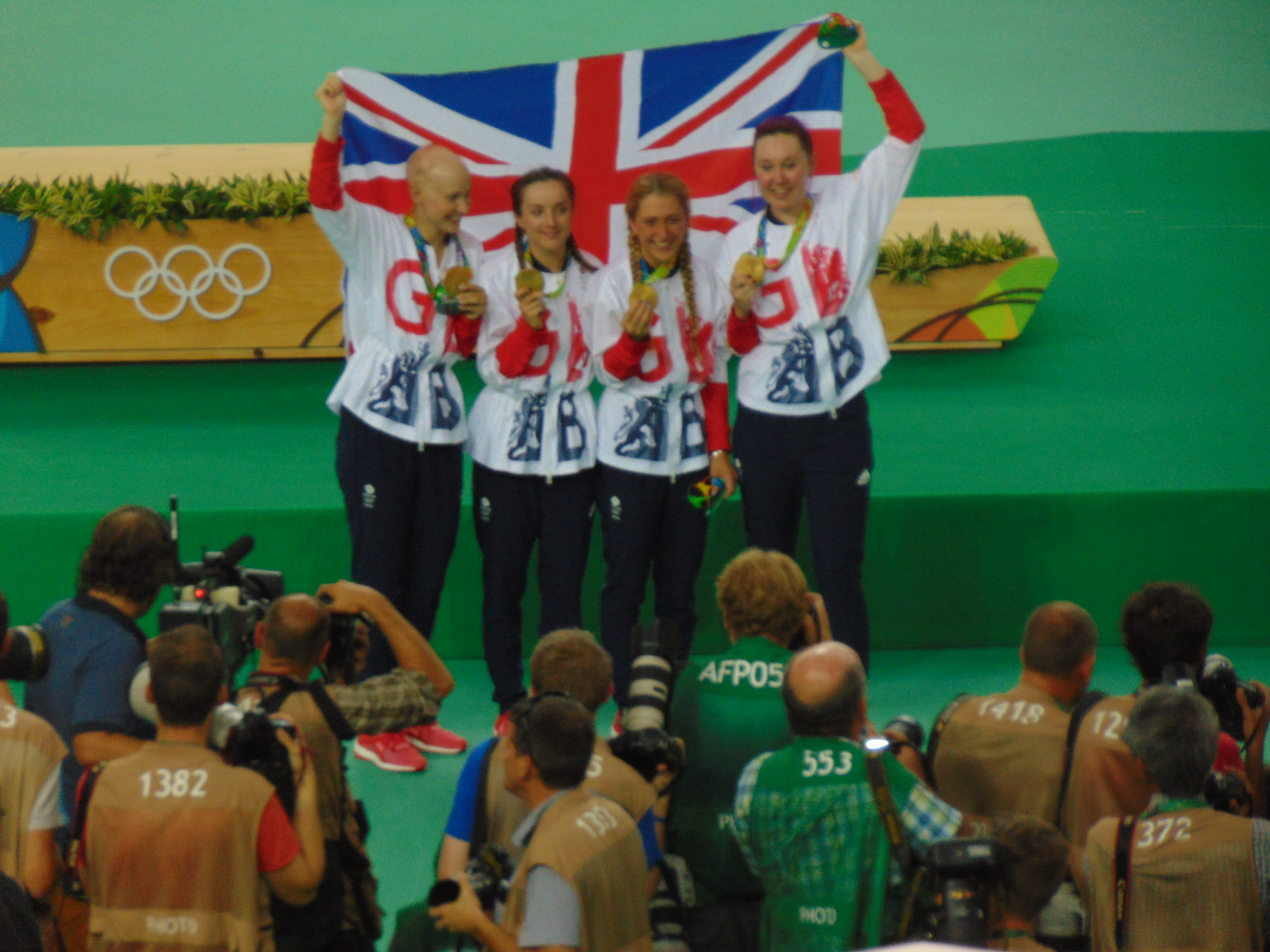
Archibald winning gold at the 2016 Summer Olympics

Archibald returned to competition at the European Championships winning the omnium and for the third year in a row the pursuit and claimed the silver medal in the elimination race. At the Six days of London event, Archibald won eight of the ten races to secure the women's omnium title with 15 points. Archibald then returned to Glasgow for the World Cup event, where she partnered Manon Lloyd to win the Madison event, but broke her wrist in an early fall whilst changing with Lloyd. Archibald returned from injury to finish second at the Six Days of Berlin, and followed it up by winning four titles at the national championships. At the final of the Six Day series in Mallorca, Archibald finished runner up to her team pursuit teammate Elinor Barker. Archibald then capped her track season by winning her first individual world title in the Omnium.

Archibald retained her Individual Pursuit and Omnium titles at the European Championships and was also part of the team that took the silver medal in the team pursuit.

Archibald was appointed Member of the Order of the British Empire (MBE) in the 2017 New Year Honours for services to cycling.

Archibald was chosen to be part of the UK's cycling squad at the postponed 2020 Tokyo Olympics where she was joined by Elinor Barker, Neah Evans, Laura Kenny and Josie Knight for the endurance races. She returned with a silver medal in the Women's team pursuit, but shared the inaugural gold medal in Women's Madison with Laura Kenny. In October 2021 Archibald was selected for the European Track cycling championships, winning her 15th and 16th gold medals in the Scratch race and Omnium to become the elite events most successful ever competitor. In June 2024, Archibald was ruled out of the upcoming Olympics in Paris. Archibald broke two bones in her leg and tore ligaments off the bone after falling over a step in her garden in a “freak accident.” She made her return to the track in October at the 2024 UCI Track Cycling World Championships in Denmark.

At the 2025 UCI Track Cycling World Championships, Archibald finished second in the elimination race. She then won the world madison title alongside Maddie Leech.

At the 2026 European Championships in Konya, Archibald was a member of the British line-up who won the gold medal in the team pursuit. The team consisting of Archibald, Morris, Knight and Millie Couzens also set a new world record of 4:02.808 in the final against Germany. Later in the championships. she won a silver medal in the madison with Morris.

=== Road ===
Her road cycling team Podium Ambition, formerly Pearl Izumi Sports Tours International, turned professional for the start of the 2016 UCI Women's World Tour. She, along with team-mates Sarah Storey and Joanna Rowsell, were the first riders to be named in the new line-up. Archibald joined Sheffield based Team WNT Pro Cycling for the 2017 season. During the 2017 season, Archibald finished third on stage three and four of the Semana Ciclista Valenciana. In the domestic Matrix Fitness Grand Prix Series, Archibald won round 2 in Stoke-on-Trent and finished second in the opening event in Redditch. Archibald finished second in the national road race championship and third in the British time trial championships on the Isle of Man, before taking the circuit racing championship in Sheffield.

For the 2018 season Archibald decided to join Wiggle High5 Pro Cycling.

== Personal life ==
Archibald's partner, Scottish racing cyclist Rab Wardell, died on 23 August 2022; she revealed she had unsuccessfully tried to save his life as he entered cardiac arrest in bed beside her.

Her brother, John, is also an elite cyclist who has represented Great Britain and Scotland. Both won medals at the 2018 Commonwealth Games representing Scotland; Katie won gold in the women's individual pursuit and John silver in the men's.

She is a cousin of Leyton Orient player Theo Archibald.

== Major results ==
=== Road ===
2014
1st Milk Race
Matrix Fitness Grand Prix Series

1st Stages 1 & 3

2nd Time trial, National Road Championships
3rd Overall British Cycling Women's Road Series

1st Cheshire Classic
1st Curlew Cup

Commonwealth Games

5th Time trial
7th Road race

2015
1st London Nocturne
1st Stage 2 Matrix Fitness Grand Prix Series
2017
National Road Championships

1st Criterium
2nd Road race
3rd Time trial

2018
3rd Overall BeNe Ladies Tour

1st Prologue

4th Time trial, Commonwealth Games
2022
4th Overall Bloeizone Fryslân Tour

=== Track ===
2012
National Junior Championships

1st Individual pursuit
2nd Points race

2013
1st Team pursuit, UEC European Championships
International Belgian Open

1st Points race
2nd Individual pursuit

National Championships

2nd Madison (with Charline Joiner)
3rd Individual pursuit

UCI World Cup

1st Team pursuit, Aguascalientes
2nd Scratch, Manchester
3rd Individual pursuit, Manchester

2014
1st Team pursuit, UCI World Championships
UEC European Championships

1st Team pursuit
1st Individual pursuit

National Championships

1st Individual pursuit
2nd Team pursuit

1st Team pursuit, UCI World Cup, London
Revolution

1st Points race, Manchester
2nd Omnium, London
2nd Points race, Manchester
3rd Omnium, London

2nd Omnium, Fenioux Piste International
3rd Points race, Commonwealth Games
2015
UEC European Championships

1st Team pursuit
1st Individual pursuit
1st Elimination

National Championships

1st Team pursuit
2nd Individual pursuit
2nd Scratch
2nd Points race

1st Omnium, Internationale Radsport Meeting
Revolution

1st Scratch, Derby
2nd Points race, Manchester
2nd Points race, London
2nd Scratch, Glasgow
3rd Points race, Manchester
3rd Points race, Glasgow
3rd Scratch, London

2nd Team pursuit, UCI World Championships
2nd Individual pursuit, UEC European Under-23 Championships
3rd Team pursuit, UCI World Cup, Cali
2016
1st Team pursuit, Olympic Games
UEC European Championships

1st Individual pursuit
1st Omnium
2nd Elimination

1st Madison, UCI World Cup, Glasgow (with Manon Lloyd)
1st Omnium, Six Days of London
2nd Omnium, Fenioux Piste International
2nd Points race, Revolution, Glasgow
2017
1st Omnium, UCI World Championships
UEC European Championships

1st Individual pursuit
1st Omnium
2nd Team pursuit

National Championships

1st Individual pursuit
1st Points race
1st Scratch
1st Omnium
2nd Keirin

UCI World Cup

1st Madison, Manchester (with Elinor Barker)
1st Madison, Milton (with Ellie Dickinson)
1st Points race, Milton
1st Team pursuit, Manchester
2nd Omnium, Manchester

International Cycling Meeting

1st Madison (with Ellie Dickinson)
1st Omnium

Six Days of Fiorenzuola

1st Madison (with Emily Nelson)
1st Omnium
1st Points race
1st Scratch

1st Overall Six Days of London

1st Omnium
2nd Madison (with Lydia Boylan)
3rd Scratch

Round 1, Revolution Series Champions League

1st Points race
1st Scratch

2nd Omnium, Six Days of Berlin
2nd Omnium, Six Day Final, Mallorca
2018
UCI World Championships

1st Madison (with Emily Nelson)
2nd Team pursuit

Commonwealth Games

1st Individual pursuit
2nd Points race

UEC European Championships

1st Team pursuit
2nd Individual pursuit
2nd Omnium

UCI World Cup

1st Madison, Milton (with Elinor Barker)
1st Team pursuit, Milton
1st Omnium, Berlin
1st Team pursuit, Berlin
1st Madison, London (with Laura Kenny)
1st Team pursuit, London

National Championships

1st Individual pursuit
1st Scratch
1st Points race
1st Madison (with Elinor Barker)
3rd Sprint

Round 3, Revolution Series Champions League

1st Scratch
2nd Points race

2019
UEC European Championships

1st Team pursuit
2nd Madison (with Laura Kenny)
3rd Individual pursuit

National Championships

1st Individual pursuit
3rd Points race
3rd Scratch
3rd Sprint

UCI World Cup, Glasgow

1st Team pursuit
2nd Madison (with Elinor Barker)

Six Day Manchester

1st Madison (with Neah Evans)
1st Omnium

1st Omnium, Six Day Finals – Brisbane
6 Giorni delle Rose – Fiorenzuola

1st Madison
2nd Omnium

Orlen Grand Prix

1st Madison (with Neah Evans)
1st Points race

Six Day London

1st Madison (with Neah Evans)
1st Omnium
2nd Scratch

2nd Team pursuit, UCI World Championships
2020
UEC European Championships

1st Points race
1st Team pursuit

2nd Team pursuit, UCI World Championships
2021
Olympic Games

1st Madison (with Laura Kenny)
2nd Team pursuit

UCI World Championships

1st Omnium
2nd Points race
3rd Team pursuit
3rd Madison (with Neah Evans)

UEC European Championships

1st Omnium
1st Madison (with Neah Evans)
1st Scratch race

1st Overall Endurance, UCI Champions League

1st Elimination, Palma
1st Scratch, Panevėžys
1st Elimination, Panevėžys
1st Elimination, London I
1st Elimination, London II
2nd Scratch, London II
3rd Scratch, London I

2022
2nd Team pursuit, UCI World Championships
2nd Team pursuit, UCI Nations Cup, Glasgow
2nd Overall Endurance, UCI Champions League

1st Scratch, Palma
1st Scratch, Berlin
1st Elimination, Berlin
1st Elimination, Paris
1st Elimination, London II
2nd Scratch, Paris
2nd Scratch, London I
3rd Scratch, London II

2023
1st Team pursuit, UCI World Championships
UEC European Championships

1st Omnium
1st Team pursuit
1st Madison (with Elinor Barker)

UCI Nations Cup, Milton

1st Omnium
1st Team pursuit
2nd Madison (with Neah Evans)

1st Overall Endurance, UCI Champions League

1st Elimination, Palma
1st Elimination, Berlin
1st Elimination, Paris
1st Elimination, London I
2nd Scratch, Palma
3rd Scratch, Paris
3rd Elimination, London II

2024
UCI World Championships

1st Team pursuit
3rd Madison (with Neah Evans)

UCI Nations Cup

1st Madison, Adelaide (with Elinor Barker)
1st Madison, Milton (with Neah Evans)
1st Omnium, Milton
1st Team pursuit, Milton
2nd Omnium, Adelaide
2nd Team pursuit, Adelaide

1st Overall Endurance, UCI Champions League

1st Scratch, Paris
1st Elimination, Paris
1st Elimination, Apeldoorn II
1st Scratch, London II
2nd Scratch, Apeldoorn I
2nd Elimination, Apeldoorn I
2nd Scratch, London I
2nd Elimination, London II

2025
UCI World Championships

1st Madison (with Maddie Leech)
2nd Elimination

National Championships

1st Points race
2nd Scratch

2026
UEC European Championships

1st Team pursuit
2nd Madison (with Anna Morris)

==== Championships timeline ====
Event		2013	2014	2015	2016	2017	2018	2019	2020	2021	2022	2023	2024	2025	2026
Olympic Games	Madison	Not held			—	Not held				1	Not held		—	NH	
Olympic Games	Team pursuit	Not held			1	Not held				2	Not held		—	NH	
World Championships	Individual pursuit	—	—	5	—	5	—	—	—	—	—	—	—		
World Championships	Madison	—	—	—	—	—	1	4	—	3	—	—	3		
World Championships	Omnium	—	—	—	—	1	—	7	—	1	—	4	—		
World Championships	Points race	—	4	—	—	—	—	—	—	2	—	—	—		
World Championships	Scratch	—	—	—	—	—	6	—	—	—	—	—	—		
World Championships	Team pursuit	—	1	2	—	—	2	2	2	3	2	1	1		
European Championships	Elimination race	Not held		1	2	—	—	—	—	—	—	—	—	—	
European Championships	Individual pursuit	NH	1	1	1	1	2	3	—	—	—	—	—	—	
European Championships	Madison	Not held			—	—	4	2	—	1	—	1	—	—	
European Championships	Omnium	—	—	—	1	1	2	—	—	1	—	1	—	—	
European Championships	Points race	15	16	—	—	—	—	—	1	—	—	—	—	—	
European Championships	Scratch	NH	—	—	—	—	—	—	—	1	—	—	—	—	
European Championships	Team pursuit	1	1	1	—	2	1	1	1	—	—	1	—	—	1
Commonwealth Games	Individual pursuit	NH	4	Not held			1	Not held			—	Not held			
Commonwealth Games	Points race	NH	3	Not held			2	Not held			—	Not held			
Commonwealth Games	Scratch	NH	5	Not held			4	Not held			—	Not held			
National Championships	Individual pursuit	3	1	2	NH	1	1	1	—	NH	—	—	—	—	
National Championships	Keirin	—	—	—	NH	2	—	—	—	NH	—	—	—	—	
National Championships	Madison	2	Not held		—	—	1	—	Not held		—	—	—		
National Championships	Omnium	Race did not exist				1	—	—	Not held		—	—	—		
National Championships	Points race	—	—	2	NH	1	1	3	—	NH	—	—	—	1	
National Championships	Scratch	—	—	2	NH	1	1	3	—	NH	—	—	—	2	
National Championships	Sprint	—	—	—	NH	—	3	3	—	NH	—	—	—	—	
National Championships	Team pursuit	—	2	1	NH	—	—	—	—	NH	—	—	—		

Legend
—	Did not compete
DNF	Did not finish
NH	Not held
IP	In progress
