= Eukene Larrarte =

Spanish cyclist

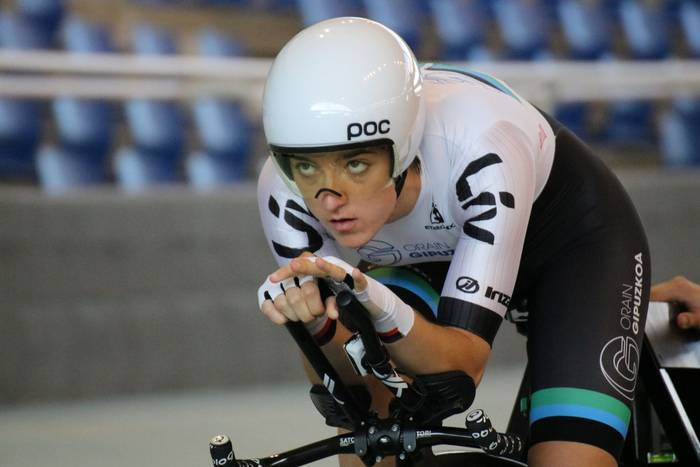

Personal information
- Full name: Eukene Larrarte Arteaga
- Born: 13 September 1998 (age 28) Tolosa, Spain

Cycling career
- Sport: Cycling
- Current team: Laboral Kutxa–Fundación Euskadi
- Disciplines: Track; Road
- Role: Rider

Professional teams
- 2020: Eneicat–RBH Global
- 2021: Laboral Kutxa–Fundación Euskadi
Medal record
Women's track cycling
Representing Spain
European Championships
Silver medal – second place	2023 Grenchen	Scratch

Eukene Larrarte (born 13 September 1998) is a Spanish cyclist, who currently rides for UCI Women's Continental Team Laboral Kutxa–Fundación Euskadi.

She initially played football, before switching to compete in cycling and joined the local team Gipuzkoa Ogi Berri.

In 2016, Larrarte won her first Spanish championship title, when she won the team pursuit together with Ane Iriarte, Ziortza Isasi and Irene Usabiaga. In 2017 she won the national Madison championship with Leire Olaberria, followed by successive titles in 2018 and 2019 with Tania Calvo. She also won the 2019 Spanish omnium championships. At the 2020 UEC European Track Championships, she finished fourth in the team pursuit with Iriarte, Isasi and Usabiaga.

At the 2021 UCI Track Cycling Nations' Cup, she achieved her first international success when she finished third in the elimination race. She also competed in the Madison, omnium and elimination race at the 2021 UCI Track Cycling World Championships.

== Major results ==
2016
1st Team pursuit, National Track Championships
2017
1st Madison, National Track Championships (with Leire Olaberria)
2018
1st Madison, National Track Championships (with Tania Calvo)
2019
National Track Championships

1st Madison (with Tania Calvo)
1st Omnium

2020
1st Madison, National Track Championships (with Tania Calvo)
2021
National Track Championships

1st Madison (with Tania Calvo)
1st Omnium
1st Elimination race
