= Kaat Van der Meulen =

Belgian cyclist

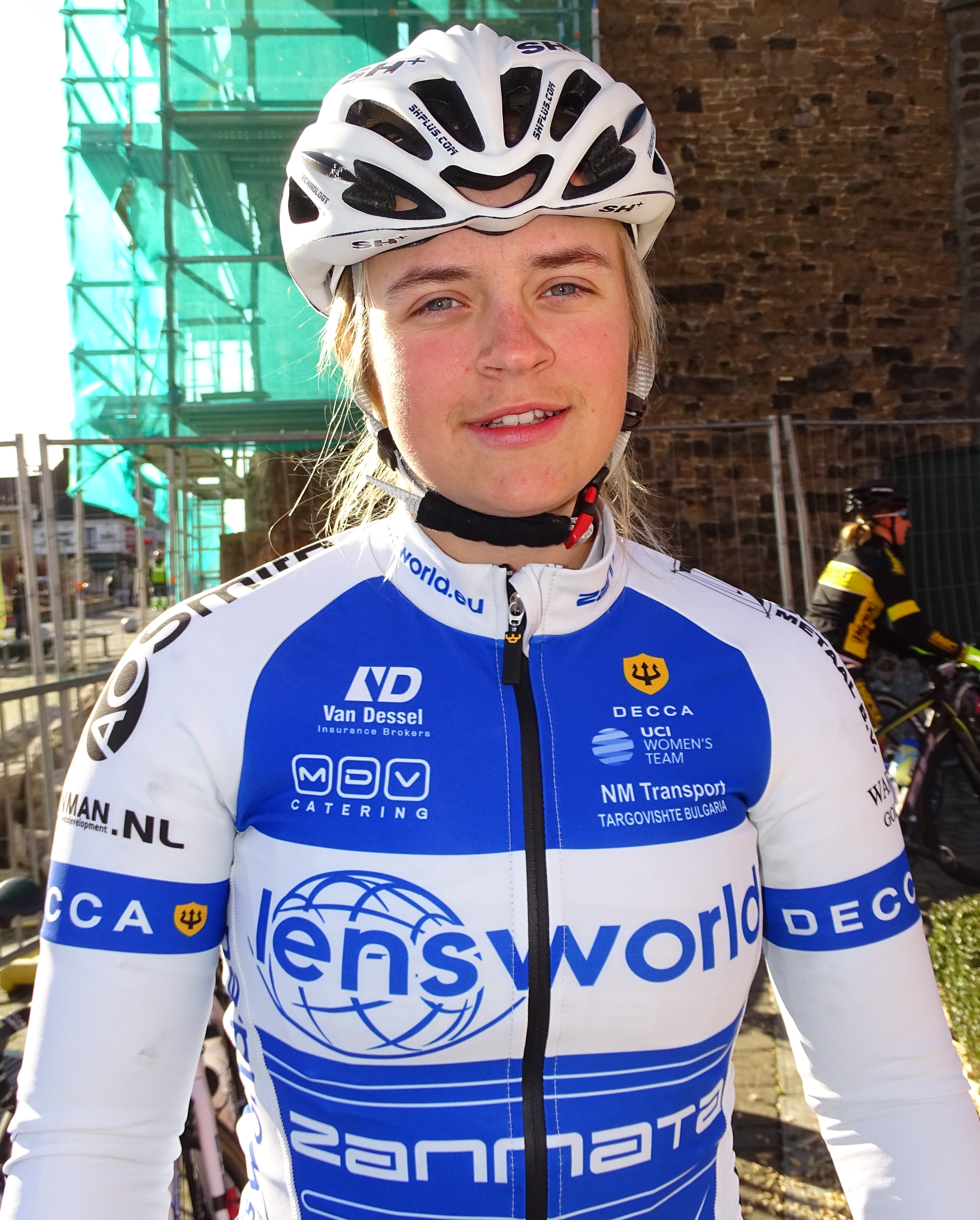
- Kaat Van der Meulen in 2016

Personal information
- Born: 22 June 1995 (age 31)

Cycling career
- Sport: Cycling
- Role: Rider

Professional teams
- 2015-2016: Lensworld–Zannata
- 2017: Lotto–Soudal Ladies

Kaat Van der Meulen (born 22 June 1995) is a retired Belgian professional racing cyclist. She rode for the Belgian teams Lensworld–Zannata and Lotto–Soudal Ladies.

== Career results ==
2016
3rd Team Pursuit, Grand Prix of Poland (with Nathalie Bex, Lenny Druyts and Lotte Kopecky)

== See also ==
- List of 2015 UCI Women's Teams and riders
