= Lydia Gurley =

Irish track cyclist

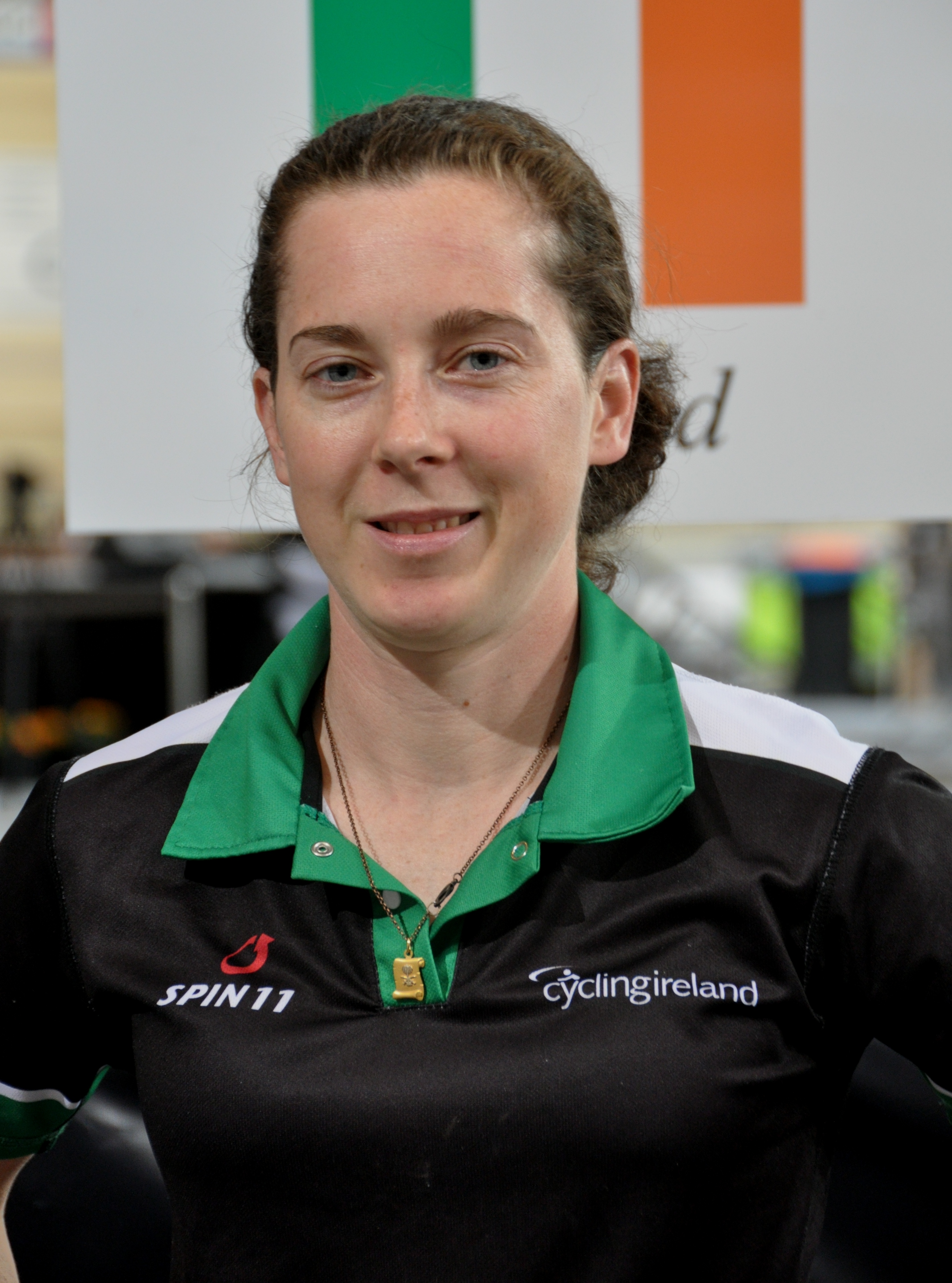
- Gurley in 2016

Personal information
- Born: 9 September 1984 (age 42) Athenry, Ireland

Cycling career
- Sport: Cycling
- Disciplines: Track; Road
- Role: Rider
Medal record
Representing Ireland
Women's track cycling
European Championships
Silver medal – second place	2017 Berlin	Madison

Lydia Gurley (born 9 September 1984) is an Irish track and road cyclist. She competed at the 2016 UEC European Track Championships in the points race, team pursuit and elimination race events.

== Major results ==
2015
2nd Road race, National Road Championships
3rd Scratch, Belgian Xmas Meetings
2016
2nd Points race, Dublin Track Cycling International
3rd Time trial, National Road Championships
2017
1st Points race, Trofeu Ciutat de Barcelona-Memorial Miquel Poblet
2nd Madison, UEC European Track Championships (with Lydia Boylan)
3rd Scratch, 2016–17 UCI Track Cycling World Cup, Cali
2018
2nd Road race, National Road Championships
2019
3rd Scratch, 2019–20 UCI Track Cycling World Cup, Cambridge
