= Inna Metalnikova =

Ukrainian cyclist

Personal information
- Born: 13 September 1991 (age 35) Ukraine

Cycling career
- Sport: Cycling
- Discipline: Track cycling

Inna Metalnikova (born 13 September 1991) is a Ukrainian female track cyclist, representing Ukraine at international competitions.

== Career ==
She competed at the 2013 UEC European Track Championships, 2015 UEC European Track Championships and 2016 UEC European Track Championships in the individual and team pursuit events.

She represented her nation at the 2015 UCI Track Cycling World Championships.

== Career results ==
2013
2nd Team Pursuit, UEC European U23 Track Championships (with Olena Demydova, Angela Pryimak and Hanna Solovey)
