= Irene Usabiaga =

Spanish cyclist (born 1993)

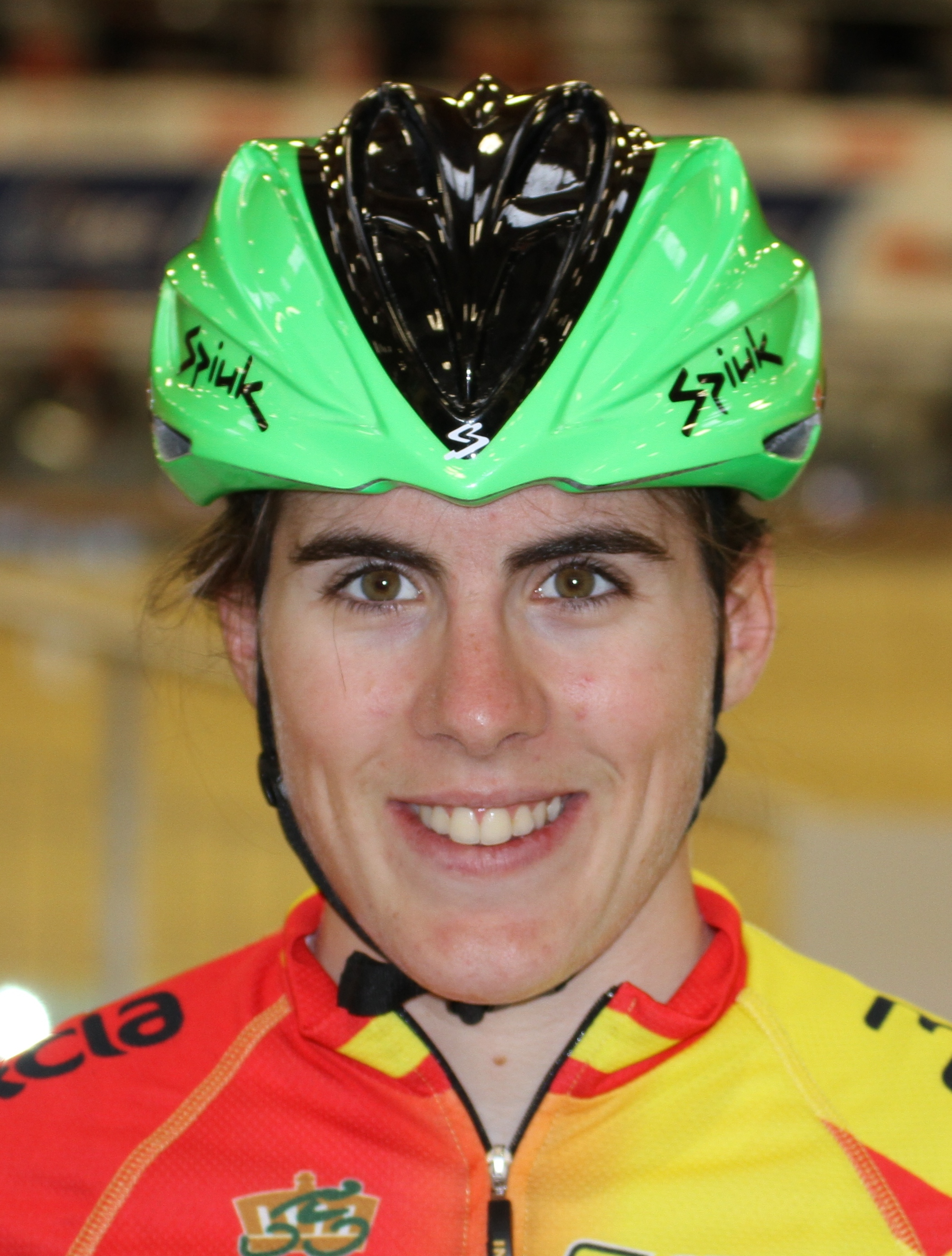
- Usabiaga at the 2015 UEC European Track Championships

Personal information
- Full name: Irene Usabiaga Balerdi
- Born: 22 September 1993 (age 33) Spain

Cycling career
- Sport: Cycling
- Current team: Eustrak–Euskadi
- Disciplines: Road; Track
- Role: Rider

Amateur team
- 2015–: Eustrak–Euskadi

Professional team
- 2012–2014: Lointek
Medal record
Representing Spain
European Track Championships
Bronze medal – third place	2015 Grenchen	Elimination race

Irene Usabiaga Balerdi (born 22 September 1993) is a Spanish road and track cyclist. In 2015, she won the bronze medal in the elimination race at the 2015 UEC European Track Championships in Grenchen, Switzerland. She was part of the UCI women's road team Lointek between 2012 and 2014. She won gold medals in the team pursuit and the scratch race at the 2012 Spanish National Track Championships.

== Major results ==
2010
1st Road race, National Junior Road Championships
2011
National Junior Road Championships

2nd Time trial
3rd Road race

7th Time trial, UEC European Junior Road Championships
2012
National Track Championships

1st Scratch
1st Team pursuit

2015
Trofeu CAR Anadia Portugal

1st Omnium
2nd Scratch

3 Jours d'Aigle

1st Scratch
2nd Individual pursuit

3rd Elimination race, UEC European Track Championships
10th Overall Vuelta a Burgos Feminas
2017
2nd Points race, Trofeu Ciutat de Barcelona–Memorial Miquel Poblet
