= Pia Pensaari =

Finnish cyclist

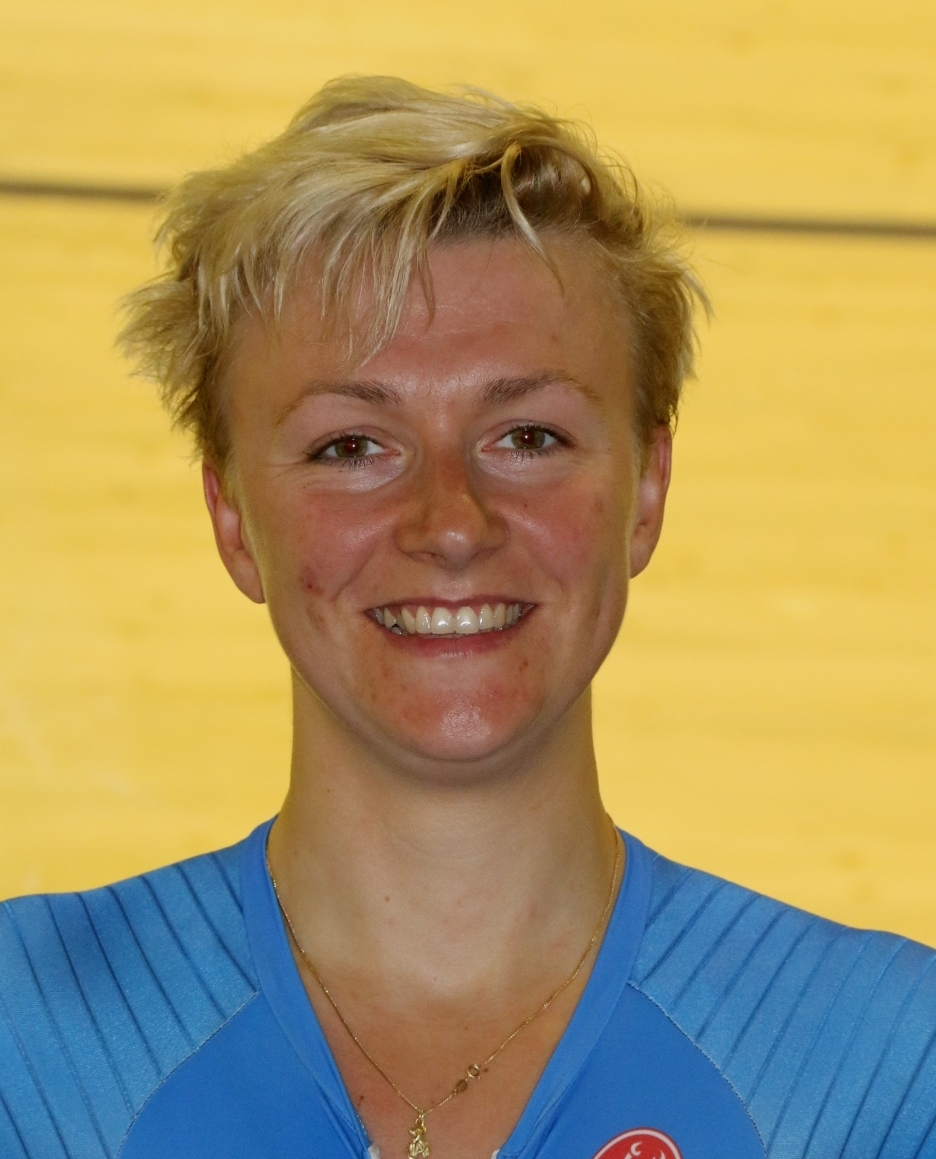
- Pensaari at the 2017 UEC European Track Championships

Personal information
- Full name: Pia Pensaari
- Born: 8 October 1983 (age 43)

Cycling career
- Sport: Cycling
- Disciplines: Track; Road
- Role: Rider
Medal record
Women's track cycling
Representing Finland

Pia Pensaari (born 8 October 1983) is a Finnish track and road cyclist. She competed at the 2016 UEC European Track Championships in the 500 m time trial and individual pursuit events.

== Major results ==
2013
3rd Team sprint, Grand Prix Vienna (with Elisa Arvo)
2014
3rd Individual pursuit, Belgian Xmas Meetings
2015
Helsinki GP

1st Individual pursuit
1st Keirin
1st Scratch

3rd Road race, National Road Championships
2017
1st Individual pursuit, Grand Prix Minsk
Helsinki GP

1st Individual pursuit
1st Scratch
1st 500 m time trial

2018
3rd Road race, National Road Championships
2019
1st Road race, National Road Championships
2020
National Track Championships

1st Elimination race
2nd 500 m time trial
2nd Points race
2nd Scratch
3rd Omnium
