= Johanna Kitti Borissza =

Hungarian track cyclist

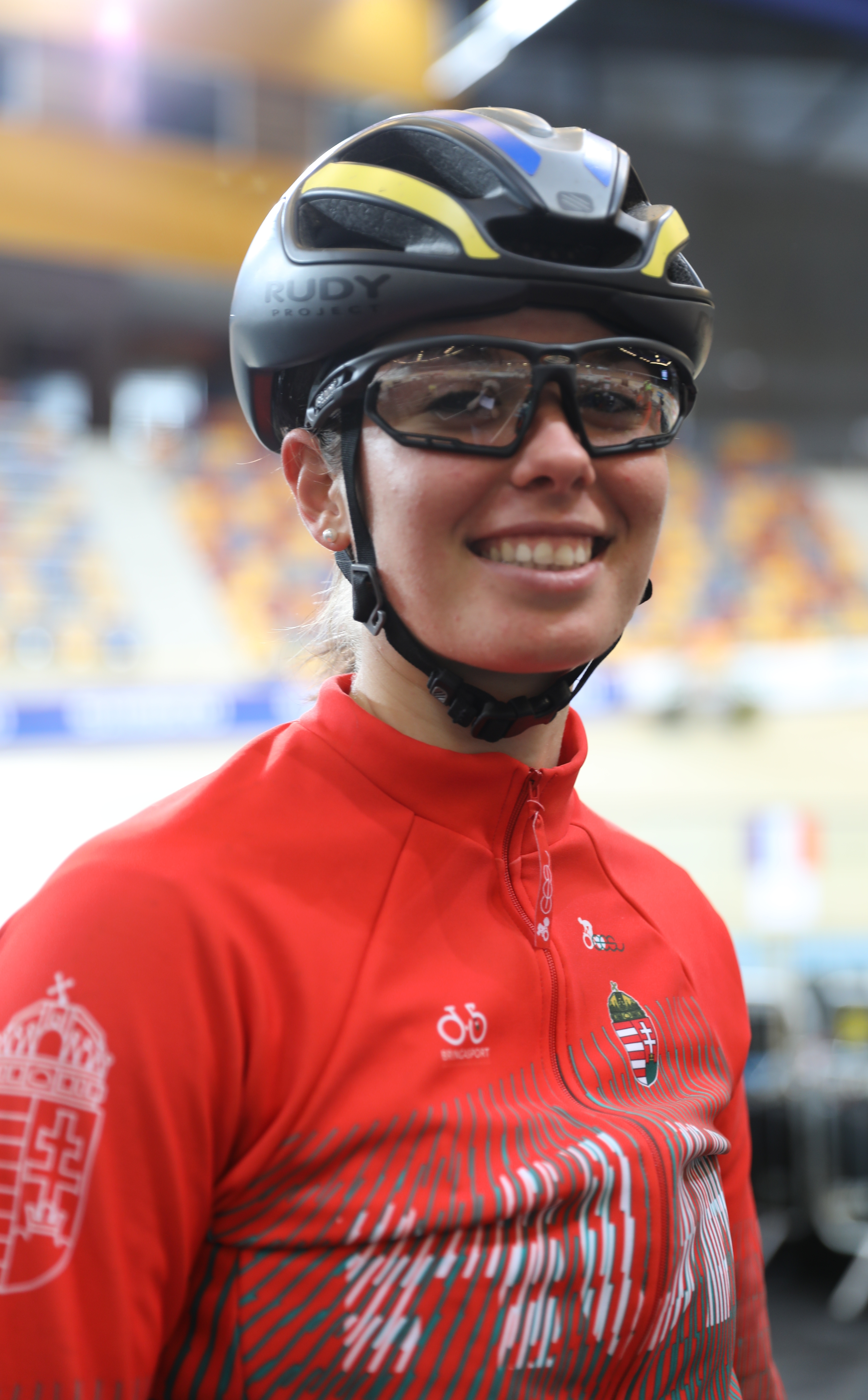
- Johanna Kitti Borissza (2019)

Cycling career
- Sport: Cycling
- Discipline: Track cycling

Johanna Kitti Borissza is a Hungarian female track cyclist, representing Hungary at international competitions. She competed at the 2016 UEC European Track Championships in the scratch event and elimination race event.
