= Andrea Waldis =

Swiss cyclist (born 1994)

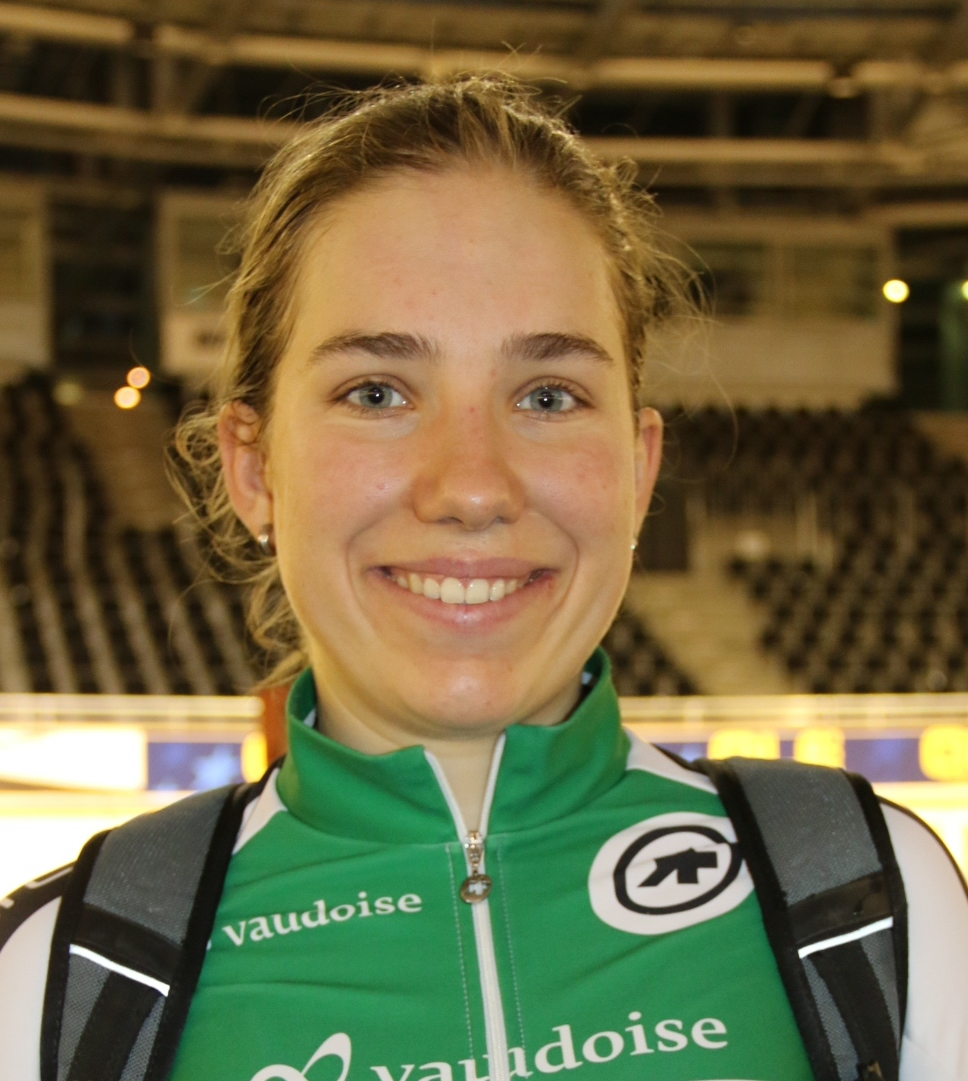
- Andrea Waldis in 2017

Personal information
- Born: 13 June 1994 (age 32)

Cycling career
- Sport: Cycling
- Role: Rider

Andrea Waldis (born 13 June 1994) is a Swiss racing cyclist. She rode in the women's omnium event at the 2018 UCI Track Cycling World Championships.
