= 2018–19 UCI Track Cycling World Cup =

International track cycling competition

2018–2019 UCI Track Cycling World Cup
- Twenty-seventh edition of the UCI Track Cycling World Cup

Details
- Dates: 19 November 2018 – 27 January 2019
- Location: France; Canada; Germany; United Kingdom; New Zealand; Hong Kong
- Races: 6

The 2018–19 UCI Track Cycling World Cup (also known as the Tissot UCI Track Cycling World Cup for sponsorship reasons) was a multi-race tournament over a track cycling season. It was the 27th series of the UCI Track Cycling World Cup organised by the UCI.

It will be the first edition of the World Cup to feature para-cycling.

== Series ==
On 12 February 2018 the UCI revealed the location and dates of the World Cup meetings for the season. Six rounds were scheduled in Saint-Quentin-en-Yvelines, France; Milton, Canada; Berlin, Germany; London, Great Britain; Cambridge, New Zealand and Hong Kong. It was the first time Saint-Quentin-en-Yvelines hosting a round of World Cup.

=== Montigny-le-Bretonneux, France ===
France's National Vélodrome de Saint-Quentin-en-Yvelines is near the city of Versailles, west of Paris. It hosted the opening round, on 19–21 October. The velodrome was completed in 2014 and hosted the 2015 UCI Track Cycling World Championships, where a number of world records were set. The velodrome also played host to the 2016 European Track Championships and will be the site of the track cycling events for the 2024 Olympic Games. It can hold 6,000 spectators.

=== Milton, Canada ===
The second round was hosted in Milton. The racing was held on three full days between 26 and 28 October 2018 at the Mattamy National Cycling Centre. The venue was built for the 2015 Pan and Parapan American Games held in Toronto. It is the only UCI Class 1 homologated indoor velodrome in Canada.

=== Berlin, Germany ===
Round 3, to be held in Berlin from 30 November to 2 December. The velodrome was designed by internationally renowned French architect Dominique Perrault for Berlin's 2000 Olympic Games bid. It was built in 1997 on the site of the former Werner-Seelenbinder-Halle. Since opening, it has played host to the 2017 European Track Championships, the 1998 UCI Track Cycling World Cup Classics and the 1999 UCI Track Cycling World Championships. Since 1997, the traditional Six Days of Berlin has also taken place here. In preparation for the 2017 European Track Championships, the track was rebuilt.

=== London, United Kingdom ===
Round 4 was held at the Lee Valley VeloPark, on 14–16 December. Completed in 2011, the velodrome was the site of the 2012 Olympic Games and 2012 Paralympic Games track events. It has hosted the 2011-12 UCI Track Cycling World Cup and 2014-15 UCI Track Cycling World Cup, and the 2016 UCI Track Cycling World Championships. The 6750-capacity velodrome has also been used for the British Revolution track series and was the site of Sir Bradley Wiggins' successful Hour Record ride in 2015. For the first time in the history of the UCI World Cup, and in line with the UCI's integration objectives, para-cycling events will also be raced during the London stopover.

=== Cambridge, New Zealand ===
The fifth round was hosted in Cambridge, which is a small town in the North Island of New Zealand. It is 24 kilometers away from the closest city Hamilton. This round was held between 18 and 20 January 2019. The Avantidrome was completed in 2014 and is the home of Cycling New Zealand's high-performance programme. The Avantidrome already hosted the 2015-16 UCI Track Cycling World Cup, as well as the Oceania Continental Track Championships and World Masters Games.

=== Hong Kong ===
The last round of this World Cup series will be hosted in Hong Kong between 25 and 27 January 2019 at the Hong Kong Velodrome. Opened in 2013, the velodrome hosted the final round of the 2015-16 UCI Track Cycling World Cup, as well as the 2017 UCI Track Cycling World Championships, which is the first one in Asia in the 21st Century. It has permanent seating for 2,000 spectators, expandable to 3,000 for events such as the World Cup.

=== Format ===
The following events will be raced at all rounds:

- Individual sprint, men and women
- Team sprint, men and women
- Keirin, men and women
- Team pursuit, men and women
- Madison, men and women
- Omnium, men and women

== Standings ==
=== Men ===
Sprint

Rank	after 6 events	Points
1	(Australia) Matthew Glaetzer	1950
2	(Poland) Mateusz Rudyk	1725
3	(Netherlands) Jeffrey Hoogland	1450
4	(Netherlands) Harrie Lavreysen	1400
5	(Japan) Tomohiro Fukaya	945

Team Sprint

Rank	after 6 events	Points
1	Netherlands	3000.0
2	Poland	2962.5
3	France	2812.5
4	Czech Republic	2550.0
5	Great Britain	2512.5

Team Pursuit

Rank	after 6 events	Points
1	Italy	4200
2	Denmark	3600
3	(United Kingdom) HUUB Wattbike Test Team	3400
4	Great Britain	3200
5	Germany	3100

Keirin

Rank	after 6 events	Points
1	(Netherlands) Matthijs Büchli (BEAT Cycling Club)	1400
2	(Canada) Hugo Barrette	1400
3	(Netherlands) Theo Bos (BEAT Cycling Club)	1250
4	(New Zealand) Edward Dawkins	1225
5	(Malaysia) Azizulhasni Awang	1145

Omnium

Rank	after 6 events	Points
1	(Greece) Christos Volikakis	1800
2	(France) Benjamin Thomas	1350
3	(Belarus) Raman Tsishkou	1300
4	(Spain) Albert Torres	1250
5	(Netherlands) Jan-Willem van Schip	1100

Madison

Rank	after 6 events	Points
1	Denmark	2000
2	Italy	1775
3	Great Britain	1725
4	Netherlands	1580
5	New Zealand	1570

1 km Time Trial

Rank	after 1 event	Points
1	(Germany) Joachim Eilers	500
2	(France) Quentin Lafargue	450
3	(Netherlands) Theo Bos (BEAT Cycling Club)	400
4	(Netherlands) Sam Ligtlee	375
5	(Germany) Eric Engler (Track Team Brandenburg)	350

Scratch Race

Rank	after 4 events	Points
1	(Ukraine) Vitaliy Hryniv	1280
2	(Austria) Stefan Matzner	1255
3	(Greece) Christos Volikakis	900
4	(Belarus) Yauheni Karaliok	865
5	(China) Guo Liang	775

Points Race

Rank	after 1 event	Points
1	(Germany) Moritz Malcharek	500
2	(United Kingdom) Mark Stewart	450
3	(Greece) Christos Volikakis	400
4	(Spain) Sebastián Mora	375
5	(Ukraine) Vitaliy Hryniv	350

=== Women ===
Sprint

Rank	after 6 events	Points
1	(Ukraine) Olena Starikova	2100
2	(Hong Kong) Lee Wai Sze	2000
3	(Australia) Stephanie Morton	1850
4	(United Kingdom) Katy Marchant	1580
5	(Russia) Daria Shmeleva (Gazprom–RusVelo)	1400

Team Sprint

Rank	after 6 events	Points
1	Germany	2075
2	Ukraine	1980
3	Poland	1775
4	(Russia) Gazprom–RusVelo	1750
5	China	1720

Team Pursuit

Rank	after 6 events	Points
1	Italy	5050
2	Great Britain	3700
3	New Zealand	3500
4	Germany	3330
5	Canada	2950

Keirin

Rank	after 6 events	Points
1	(Hong Kong) Lee Wai Sze	1775
2	(Australia) Stephanie Morton	1525
3	(Netherlands) Laurine van Riessen	1505
4	(Lithuania) Simona Krupeckaitė	1365
5	(Poland) Urszula Łoś	1295

Omnium

Rank	after 6 events	Points
1	(Netherlands) Kirsten Wild	1500
2	(Canada) Allison Beveridge	1380
3	(Belgium) Lotte Kopecky	1325
4	(Lithuania) Olivija Baleišytė	1315
5	(Italy) Letizia Paternoster	1275

Madison

Rank	after 6 events	Points
1	Great Britain	1950
2	Italy	1920
3	Russia	1775
4	Belgium	1750
5	Denmark	1400

500m Time Trial

Rank	after 1 event	Points
1	(Ukraine) Olena Starikova	500
2	(Germany) Miriam Welte	450
3	(Russia) Daria Shmeleva (Gazprom–RusVelo)	400
4	(Netherlands) Elis Ligtlee	375
5	(Poland) Urszula Łoś	350

Scratch Race

Rank	after 4 events	Points
1	(Italy) Martina Fidanza	1000
2	(Germany) Lisa Küllmer	975
3	(Russia) Aleksandra Goncharova	950
4	(New Zealand) Holly Edmondston	900
5	(Poland) Daria Pikulik	850

Points Race

Rank	after 1 event	Points
1	(Italy) Maria Giulia Confalonieri	500
2	(Ukraine) Hanna Solovey	450
3	(Germany) Charlotte Becker	400
4	(Austria) Verena Eberhardt	375
5	(Republic of Ireland) Lydia Gurley	350

=== Overall Team Standings ===
Overall team standings are calculated based on total number of points gained by the team's riders in each event.

Rank	Team	(France)	(Canada)	(Germany)	(United Kingdom)	(New Zealand)	(Hong Kong)	Total Points
1	Australia	6315.0	3375.0	5225.0	2475.0	4265.0	6386.0	28041.0
2	Great Britain	6837.5	6251.0	5876.0	6526.0	950.0	350.0	26790.5
3	Germany	5415.0	4991.0	5885.0	4190.0	530.0	4218.5	25229.5
4	France	5435.0	5687.5	1975.0	3840.0	2825.0	4540.0	24302.5
5	Italy	4551.0	2978.0	3435.0	3190.0	3900.0	4625.0	22679.0
6	Poland	4839.5	3132.0	3484.5	3844.5	3160.0	3632.0	22092.5
7	New Zealand	5060.0	4588.5		225.0	7000.0	3321.0	20194.5
8	Netherlands	4636.0	3225.0	5360.0	4500.0	860.0	1500.0	20081.0
9	Ukraine	3876.0	1805.0	2725.0	2016.0	3575.0	2855.0	16852.0
10	Russia	3740.0	3235.0	3423.5	1305.5	2628.5	2186.0	16518.5

== Results ==
=== Men ===
Event	Winner	Second	Third
France, Saint-Quentin-en-Yvelines | 19–21 October 2018
Sprint; Details	Matthew Glaetzer (AUS) +0.067/10.200/10.398	Harrie Lavreysen (NED); 9.947/+0.018/+0.297	Jeffrey Hoogland (NED); 10.498/10.508
Team Sprint; Details	Netherlands; Roy van den Berg; Jeffrey Hoogland; Sam Ligtlee; 42.939	France; Grégory Baugé; Sébastien Vigier; Michaël D'Almeida; 43.566	Russia; Pavel Yakushevskiy; Denis Dmitriev; Shane Perkins; 43.771
Team Pursuit; Details	Denmark; Julius Johansen; Lasse Norman Hansen; Rasmus Pedersen; Casper von Folsach	Great Britain; Oliver Wood; Mark Stewart; Ed Clancy; Kian Emadi; Steven Burke (Overlapped)	Italy; Michele Scartezzini; Liam Bertazzo; Filippo Ganna; Francesco Lamon; Simone Consonni; 3:53.153
Keirin; Details	Yuta Wakimoto (JPN) (Japan Professional Cycling Associacion); 10.249	Eddie Dawkins (NZL) +0.079	Krzysztof Maksel (POL) +0.128
Omnium; Details	Albert Torres (ESP); 174 pts	Oliver Wood (GBR); 142 pts	Benjamin Thomas (FRA); 139 pts
Points Race; Details	Moritz Malcharek (GER); 53 pts	Mark Stewart (GBR); 45 pts	Christos Volikakis (GRE); 43 pts
Scratch Race; Details	Stefan Matzner (AUT)	Leigh Howard (AUS)	Adrien Garel (FRA)
Madison; Details	Denmark; Lasse Norman Hansen; Michael Mørkøv; 39 pts	Poland; Wojciech Pszczolarski; Daniel Staniszewski; 19 pts	Australia; Kelland O'Brien; Leigh Howard; 17 pts
Canada, Milton | 26–28 October 2018
Sprint; Details	Matthew Glaetzer (AUS) +0.101/10.085/10.271	Harrie Lavreysen (NED); 9.912/+0.040/+0.093	Jeffrey Hoogland (NED); 10.000/9.956
Team Sprint; Details	Netherlands; Nils van 't Hoenderdaal; Harrie Lavreysen; Jeffrey Hoogland; Sam Ligtlee; 42.828	BEAT Cycling Club; Roy van den Berg; Theo Bos; Matthijs Büchli 43.306	Great Britain; Ryan Owens; Philip Hindes; Jason Kenny 43.126
Team Pursuit; Details	Denmark; Casper von Folsach; Lasse Norman Hansen; Julius Johansen; Rasmus Pedersen 3:53.499	HUUB Wattbike Test Team; John Archibald; Daniel Bigham; Harry Tanfield; Jonathan Wale 3:56.699	Great Britain; Oliver Wood; Steven Burke; Ed Clancy; Kian Emadi; Mark Stewart; 3:54.134
Keirin; Details	Jason Kenny (GBR); 10.335	Hugo Barrette (CAN) +0.042	Matthijs Büchli (NED) (BEAT Cycling Club) +0.089
Omnium; Details	Benjamin Thomas (FRA); 144 pts	Mark Stewart (GBR); 134 pts	Campbell Stewart (NZL); 132 pts
Scratch Race; Details	Vitaliy Hryniv (UKR)	Oliver Wood (GBR)	Christos Volikakis (GRE)
Madison; Details	Denmark; Casper von Folsach; Julius Johansen; 38 pts	Great Britain; Mark Stewart; Oliver Wood; 28 pts	United States; Daniel Holloway; Adrian Hegyvary; 25 pts
Germany, Berlin | 30 November – 2 December 2018
Sprint; Details	Matthew Glaetzer (AUS); 10.223/10.443	Matthijs Büchli (NED) (BEAT Cycling Club) +0.032/+0.032	Rayan Helal (FRA); 10.419/10.381
Team Sprint; Details	Netherlands; Harrie Lavreysen; Jeffrey Hoogland; Nils van 't Hoenderdaal; Sam Ligtlee; 42.467	Great Britain; Jason Kenny; Philip Hindes; Ryan Owens; Jack Carlin; 42.981	Germany; Joachim Eilers; Timo Bichler; Stefan Bötticher; Maximilian Levy; 43.778
Team Pursuit; Details	Australia; Sam Welsford; Alexander Porter; Kelland O'Brien; Leigh Howard; Cameron Scott; 3:51.210	Denmark; Lasse Norman Hansen; Casper von Folsach; Julius Johansen; Rasmus Pedersen 3:54.703	Canada; Derek Gee; Michael Foley; Aidan Caves; Jay Lamoureux; Adam Jamieson; 3:56.339
1 km Time Trial; Details	Joachim Eilers (GER); 1:00.645	Quentin Lafargue (FRA); 1:00.660	Theo Bos (NED) (BEAT Cycling Club); 1:00.868
Keirin; Details	Matthijs Büchli (NED) (BEAT Cycling Club); 10.483	Matthew Glaetzer (AUS) +0.213	Azizulhasni Awang (MAS) +0.240
Omnium; Details	Sam Welsford (AUS); 128 pts	Albert Torres (ESP); 118 pts	Jan-Willem van Schip (NED); 113 pts
Madison; Details	Denmark; Lasse Norman Hansen; Casper von Folsach; 44 pts	Great Britain; Oliver Wood; Mark Stewart; 30 pts	Germany; Roger Kluge; Theo Reinhardt; 24 pts
United Kingdom, London | 14–16 December 2018
Sprint; Details	Harrie Lavreysen (NED); 10.108/10.282	Matthew Glaetzer (AUS) +0.092/+0.411	Jeffrey Hoogland (NED) +0.021/10.595/10.294
Team Sprint; Details	Netherlands; Harrie Lavreysen; Matthijs Büchli; Roy van den Berg; Jeffrey Hoogland; 42.789	Great Britain; Ryan Owens; Philip Hindes; Joseph Truman; Jason Kenny; 44.186	Germany; Joachim Eilers; Timo Bichler; Maximilian Levy 44.001
Team Pursuit; Details	HUUB Wattbike Test Team; John Archibald; Ashton Lambie; Daniel Bigham; Jonathan Wale 3:57.726	Belgium; Fabio Van den Bossche; Robbe Ghys; Kenny De Ketele; Lindsay De Vylder 3:59.014	Great Britain; Matthew Walls; Fred Wright; Ethan Vernon; William Tidball; Ethan Hayter; 3:59.609
Keirin; Details	Matthijs Büchli (NED); 10.315	Azizulhasni Awang (MAS) +0.033	Theo Bos (NED) (BEAT Cycling Club) +0.180
Omnium; Details	Matthew Walls (GBR); 131 pts	Ignacio Prado (MEX); 123 pts	Elia Viviani (ITA); 114 pts
Madison; Details	Denmark; Julius Johansen; Casper von Folsach; 46 pts	Great Britain; Matthew Walls; Fred Wright; 30 pts	Spain; Sebastián Mora; Albert Torres; 21 pts
New Zealand, Cambridge | 18–20 January 2019
Sprint; Details	Nathan Hart (AUS); 10.391/10.115	Mateusz Rudyk (POL) +0.345/+0.107	Sébastien Vigier (FRA); 10.298/+0.023/10.342
Team Sprint; Details	New Zealand; Ethan Mitchell; Sam Webster; Eddie Dawkins 43.121	Australia; Nathan Hart; Jacob Schmid; Thomas Clarke 43.734	France; Grégory Baugé; Sébastien Vigier; Michaël D'Almeida; Quentin Lafargue; 43.328
Team Pursuit; Details	New Zealand; Regan Gough; Campbell Stewart; Jordan Kerby; Nicholas Kergozou; Tom Sexton; 3:50.159	Canada; Aidan Caves; Derek Gee; Adam Jamieson; Jay Lamoureux; Vincent De Haître; 3:53.156	Switzerland; Claudio Imhof; Stefan Bissegger; Frank Pasche; Cyrille Thièry; Lukas Rüegg; 3:55.204
Keirin; Details	Eddie Dawkins (NZL); 10.266	Quentin Lafargue (FRA) +0.051	Yudai Nitta (JPN) +0.070
Omnium; Details	Claudio Imhof (SUI); 113 pts	Raman Tsishkou (BLR); 112 pts	Liam Bertazzo (ITA); 108 pts
Scratch Race; Details	Christos Volikakis (GRE)	Théry Schir (SUI)	Stefan Matzner (AUT)
Madison; Details	New Zealand; Campbell Stewart; Aaron Gate; 76 pts	Netherlands; Yoeri Havik; Roy Pieters; 30 pts	United States; Daniel Holloway; Adrian Hegyvary; 26 pts
Hong Kong | 25–27 January 2019
Sprint; Details	Thomas Clarke (AUS); 10.823/10.418	James Brister (AUS) +0.015/+0.077	Xu Chao (CHN); 10.258/10.319
Team Sprint; Details	Australia; Matthew Richardson; Thomas Clarke; James Brister; 43.815	Japan; Kazuki Amagai; Yudai Nitta; Tomohiro Fukaya; 44.148	Poland; Mateusz Miłek; Maciej Bielecki; Patryk Rajkowski; 44.202
Team Pursuit; Details	Italy; Liam Bertazzo; Francesco Lamon; Filippo Ganna; Davide Plebani; Michele Scartezzini; 3:53.478	United States; Daniel Summerhill; Ashton Lambie; Colby Lange; Eric Young; Gavin Hoover; 3:59.215	Australia; Godfrey Slattery; Jarrad Drizners; Conor Leahy; Lucas Plapp; Sam Welsford; 3:57.423
Keirin; Details	Theo Bos (NED) (BEAT Cycling Club); 10.535	Tomoyuki Kawabata (JPN) (Japan Professional Cyclist Association) +0.024	Oh Je-seok (KOR) +0.083
Omnium; Details	Cameron Meyer (AUS); 134 pts	Campbell Stewart (NZL); 116 pts	Niklas Larsen (DEN); 114 pts
Scratch Race; Details	Guo Liang (CHN)	Adrian Hegyvary (USA)	Clément Davy (FRA)
Madison; Details	New Zealand; Thomas Sexton; Campbell Stewart; 33 pts	Australia; Sam Welsford; Kelland O'Brien; 29 pts	France; Benjamin Thomas; Florian Maitre; 21 pts

=== Women ===
Event	Winner	Second	Third
France, Saint-Quentin-en-Yvelines | 19–21 October 2018
Sprint; Details	Lee Wai Sze (HKG); 11.380/10.979	Stephanie Morton (AUS) +0.002/+0.190	Daria Shmeleva (RUS) (Gazprom–RusVelo) +0.026/11.568/11.648
Team Sprint; Details	Gazprom–RusVelo; Daria Shmeleva; Anastasia Voynova; 32.820	Australia; Kaarle McCulloch; Stephanie Morton; 32.821	Ukraine; Olena Starikova; Lyubov Basova; 33.095
Team Pursuit; Details	Australia; Kristina Clonan; Ashlee Ankudinoff; Georgia Baker; Macey Stewart; 4:16.957	New Zealand; Bryony Botha; Rushlee Buchanan; Holly Edmondston; Kirstie James; 4:17.560	Italy; Letizia Paternoster; Elisa Balsamo; Marta Cavalli; Silvia Valsecchi; 4:19.428
Keirin; Details	Laurine van Riessen (NED); 11.408	Daria Shmeleva (RUS) (Gazprom–RusVelo) +0.025	Lee Wai Sze (HKG) +0.073
Omnium; Details	Kirsten Wild (NED); 125 pts	Letizia Paternoster (ITA); 116 pts	Neah Evans (GBR); 109 pts
Points Race; Details	Maria Giulia Confalonieri (AUS); 34 pts	Ganna Solovei (UKR); 33 pts	Charlotte Becker (GER); 30 pts
Scratch Race; Details	Ashlee Ankudinoff (AUS)	Megan Barker (GBR)	Daria Pikulik (POL)
Madison; Details	Denmark; Amalie Dideriksen; Julie Leth; 23 pts	Great Britain; Neah Evans; Emily Kay; 23 pts	Australia; Georgia Baker; Macey Stewart; 19 pts
Canada, Milton | 26–28 October 2018
Sprint; Details	Lee Wai Sze (HKG); 11.361/11.353	Emma Hinze (GER) +0.091/+0.138	Stephanie Morton (AUS) +0.056/11.322
Team Sprint; Details	Australia; Stephanie Morton; Kaarle McCulloch; 32.456	Germany; Emma Hinze; Miriam Welte; 32.693	Gazprom–RusVelo; Daria Shmeleva; Anastasia Voynova; 32.692
Team Pursuit; Details	Great Britain; Laura Kenny; Katie Archibald; Elinor Barker; Eleanor Dickinson 4:18.138	Italy; Elisa Balsamo; Marta Cavalli; Simona Frapporti; Silvia Valsecchi 4:21.936	New Zealand; Rushlee Buchanan; Kirstie James; Bryony Botha; Holly Edmondston; Ellesse Andrews; 4:19.247
Keirin; Details	Madalyn Godby (USA); 11.376	Stephanie Morton (AUS) +0.050	Martha Bayona (COL) +0.090
Omnium; Details	Laura Kenny (GBR); 133 pts	Lizbeth Salazar Vazquez (MEX); 115 pts	Jennifer Valente (USA); 113 pts
Scratch Race; Details	Aleksandra Goncharova (RUS)	Olivija Baleišytė (LTU)	Jennifer Valente (USA)
Madison; Details	Great Britain; Katie Archibald; Elinor Barker; 36 pts	Denmark; Amalie Dideriksen; Julie Leth; 19 pts	Canada; Allison Beveridge; Stephanie Roorda; 13 pts
Germany, Berlin | 30 November - 2 December 2018
Sprint; Details	Stephanie Morton (AUS); 11.412/11.380	Anastasia Voynova (RUS) (Gazprom–RusVelo) +0.071/+0.182	Olena Starikova (UKR); 11.534/+0.015/11.416
Team Sprint; Details	Gazprom–RusVelo; Daria Shmeleva; Anastasia Voynova 32.633	Germany; Miriam Welte; Emma Hinze; Pauline Grabosch; 32.922	China; Zhong Tianshi; Lin Junhong 33.336
Team Pursuit; Details	Great Britain; Katie Archibald; Emily Kay; Laura Kenny; Emily Nelson; Jessica Roberts; 4:16.153	Australia; Annette Edmondson; Ashlee Ankudinoff; Georgia Baker; Amy Cure 4:16.413	Canada; Allison Beveridge; Ariane Bonhomme; Annie Foreman-Mackey; Stephanie Roorda; Kinley Gibson (Overlapped)
500m Time Trial; Details	Olena Starikova (UKR); 33.210	Miriam Welte (GER); 33.400	Daria Shmeleva (RUS) (Gazprom–RusVelo); 32.435
Keirin; Details	Laurine van Riessen (NED) (BEAT Cycling Club); 11.151	Emma Hinze (GER) +0.071	Yuka Kobayashi (JPN) (Dreamseeker Racing Team) +0.128
Omnium; Details	Katie Archibald (GBR); 132 pts	Letizia Paternoster (ITA); 118 pts	Jennifer Valente (USA); 116 pts
Madison; Details	Great Britain; Laura Kenny; Emily Nelson; 37 pts	Denmark; Amalie Dideriksen; Julie Leth; 28 pts	Belgium; Lotte Kopecky; Jolien D'Hoore; 14 pts
United Kingdom, London | 14–16 December 2018
Sprint; Details	Stephanie Morton (AUS); 11.212/11.196	Emma Hinze (GER) +0.031/+0.076	Laurine van Riessen (NED); 11.448/11.336
Team Sprint; Details	China; Zhong Tianshi; Lin Junhong 32.771	Germany; Emma Hinze; Miriam Welte; Pauline Grabosch; 32.808	Netherlands; Kyra Lamberink; Shanne Braspennincx; Hetty van de Wouw; 33.145
Team Pursuit; Details	Great Britain; Laura Kenny; Katie Archibald; Neah Evans; Eleanor Dickinson; Elinor Barker	United States; Christina Birch; Kelly Catlin; Kimberly Geist; Emma White; Jennifer Valente (Overlapped)	Italy; Elisa Balsamo; Vittoria Guazzini; Simona Frapporti; Silvia Valsecchi 4:23.765
Keirin; Details	Stephanie Morton (AUS); 11.297	Daria Shmeleva (RUS) (Gazprom–RusVelo) +0.012	Urszula Łoś (POL) +0.012
Omnium; Details	Kirsten Wild (NED); 124 pts	Jennifer Valente (USA); 118 pts	Allison Beveridge (CAN); 106 pts
Madison; Details	Great Britain; Katie Archibald; Laura Kenny; 34 pts	Australia; Amy Cure; Annette Edmondson; 19 pts	Belgium; Jolien D'Hoore; Lotte Kopecky; 17 pts
New Zealand, Cambridge | 18–20 January 2019
Sprint; Details	Lee Wai Sze (HKG); 11.208/11.142	Olena Starikova (UKR) +0.226/+0.151	Kaarle McCulloch (AUS) +0.022/11.576/11.498
Team Sprint; Details	Holy Brother Cycling Team; Song Chaorui; Bao Shanju; 33.460	France; Sandie Clair; Mathilde Gros; 33.624	Poland; Marlena Karwacka; Urszula Łoś; 33.710
Team Pursuit; Details	New Zealand; Racquel Sheath; Bryony Botha; Rushlee Buchanan; Kirstie James; Michaela Drummond; 4:16.028	Canada; Allison Beveridge; Ariane Bonhomme; Annie Foreman-Mackey; Georgia Simmerling 4:17.270	Italy; Elisa Balsamo; Letizia Paternoster; Martina Alzini; Marta Cavalli 4:18.069
Keirin; Details	Lee Wai Sze (HKG); 11.408	Katy Marchant (GBR) +0.004	Lyubov Basova (UKR) +0.080
Omnium; Details	Annette Edmondson (AUS); 131 pts	Allison Beveridge (CAN); 123 pts	Yumi Kajihara (JPN); 113 pts
Scratch Race; Details	Martina Fidanza (ITA)	Daria Pikulik (POL)	Jessy Hodges (NZL) (Subway New Zealand Track Trade Team)
Madison; Details	Belgium; Jolien D'Hoore; Lotte Kopecky; 39 pts	Italy; Letizia Paternoster; Maria Giulia Confalonieri; 27 pts	New Zealand; Racquel Sheath; Rushlee Buchanan; 9 pts
Hong Kong | 25–27 January 2019
Sprint; Details	Lee Wai Sze (HKG); 11.545/11.793	Lee Hye-jin (KOR) +0.477/+1.233	Simona Krupeckaitė (LTU); 11.440/11.453
Team Sprint; Details	China; Lin Junhong; Zhong Tianshi; Guo Yufang; 32.934	Ukraine; Olena Starikova; Lyubov Basova 33.430	Lithuania; Miglė Marozaitė; Simona Krupeckaitė 33.480
Team Pursuit; Details	Italy; Elisa Balsamo; Letizia Paternoster; Martina Alzini; Marta Cavalli 4:17.833	Germany; Franziska Brauße; Gudrun Stock; Charlotte Becker; Lisa Klein 4:23.289	New Zealand; Lauren Ellis; Ellesse Andrews; Michaela Drummond; Emily Shearman; Jessy Hodges; 4:21.331
Keirin; Details	Lee Wai Sze (HKG); 11.253	Riyu Oita (JPN) +0.088	Jessica Lee (HKG) (Giant-Max Success Sports Pro Cycling) +0.142
Omnium; Details	Kirsten Wild (NED); 137 pts	Laurie Berthon (FRA); 114 pts	Alexandra Manly (AUS); 109 pts
Scratch Race; Details	Martina Fidanza (ITA)	Alex Martin-Wallace (AUS)	Jolien D'Hoore (BEL)
Madison; Details	Netherlands; Kirsten Wild; Amy Pieters; 29 pts	Belgium; Lotte Kopecky; Jolien D'Hoore; 24 pts	Italy; Elisa Balsamo; Maria Giulia Confalonieri; 12 pts

== Medal table ==
Rank	Team	Gold	Silver	Bronze	Total
1	Australia	16	12	6	34
2	Netherlands	11	3	6	20
3	Great Britain	10	13	4	27
4	Denmark	7	3	0	10
5	New Zealand	6	2	5	13
6	Hong Kong	6	0	1	7
7	Italy	5	4	7	16
8	BEAT Cycling Club	3	2	3	8
9	China	3	0	2	5
10	Germany	2	8	4	14
11	Gazprom–RusVelo	2	3	3	8
11	Ukraine	2	3	3	8
13	France	1	6	7	14
14	United States	1	4	5	10
15	Belgium	1	2	3	6
16	Spain	1	1	1	3
16	Switzerland	1	1	1	3
18	HUUB Wattbike Test Team	1	1	0	2
18	Japan Professional Cyclist Association	1	1	0	2
20	Greece	1	0	2	3
21	Austria	1	0	1	2
21	Russia	1	0	1	2
23	Holy Brother Cycling Team	1	0	0	1
24	Canada	0	4	4	8
25	Poland	0	3	5	8
26	Japan	0	2	2	4
27	Mexico	0	2	0	2
28	Lithuania	0	1	2	3
29	Malaysia	0	1	1	2
29	South Korea	0	1	1	2
31	Belarus	0	1	0	1
32	Colombia	0	0	1	1
32	Dream Seeker	0	0	1	1
32	Giant-Max Success Sports Pro Cycling	0	0	1	1
32	Subway New Zealand Track Trade Team	0	0	1	1
Totals (35 entries)		84	84	84	252
