= 2019–20 UCI Track Cycling World Cup =

International track cycling competition

2019–2020 UCI Track Cycling World Cup
- Twenty-eighth edition of the UCI Track Cycling World Cup

Details
- Dates: 1 November 2019 – 26 January 2020
- Location: Belarus; United Kingdom; Hong Kong; New Zealand; Australia; Canada
- Races: 6

The 2019–20 UCI Track Cycling World Cup (also known as the Tissot UCI Track Cycling World Cup for sponsorship reasons) is a multi-race tournament over a track cycling season. It is the 28th series of the UCI Track Cycling World Cup organised by the UCI. This was the last season of the competition as World Cup because from 2021, the competition will be renamed to UCI Track Cycling Nations Cup.

== Series ==
Six rounds are scheduled:

Date	Location
1–3 November, 2019	Minsk, Belarus
7–10 November, 2019	Glasgow, United Kingdom
29 November – 1 December, 2019	Hong Kong
6–8 December, 2019	Cambridge, New Zealand
13–15 December, 2019	Brisbane, Australia
23–26 January, 2020	Milton, Canada

=== Format ===
The following events will be raced at all rounds:

- Individual sprint, men and women
- Team sprint, men and women
- Keirin, men and women
- Team pursuit, men and women
- Madison, men and women
- Omnium, men and women

== Standings ==
=== Men ===
Sprint

Rank	after 6 events	Points
1	(Poland) Mateusz Rudyk	2600
2	(Netherlands) Harrie Lavreysen	1500
3	(Netherlands) Jeffrey Hoogland	1350
4	(Suriname) Jaïr Tjon En Fa	1345
5	(Japan) Tomohiro Fukaya	1250

Team Sprint

Rank	after 6 events	Points
1	Poland	3562.5
2	Russia	2850.0
3	France	2512.5
4	Japan	2400.0
5	China	2362.5

Team Pursuit

Rank	after 6 events	Points
1	Italy	4600
2	Switzerland	3900
3	Russia	3200
4	Germany	3050
5	Canada	2800

Keirin

Rank	after 6 events	Points
1	(Thailand) Jai Angsuthasawit	1595
2	(Russia) Denis Dmitriev	1525
3	(Colombia) Kevin Quintero	1520
4	(Russia) Shane Perkins (Gazprom–RusVelo)	1380
5	(Trinidad and Tobago) Kwesi Browne	1000

Omnium

Rank	after 6 events	Points
1	(Greece) Christos Volikakis	1425
2	(Germany) Roger Kluge	1360
3	(Mexico) Ignacio Prado	1350
4	(Hong Kong) Leung Ka Yu	1105
5	(Netherlands) Jan-Willem van Schip	1050

Madison

Rank	after 6 events	Points
1	Italy	1825
2	France	1750
3	Switzerland	1735
4	Great Britain	1650
5	Hong Kong	1420

=== Women ===
Sprint

Rank	after 6 events	Points
1	(Hong Kong) Lee Wai Sze	2000
2	(Canada) Kelsey Mitchell (P2m)	1550
3	(Ukraine) Olena Starikova	1525
4	(Russia) Anastasia Voynova	1350
5	(Germany) Emma Hinze	1300

Team Sprint

Rank	after 6 events	Points
1	Poland	2350
2	China	1900
3	Russia	1650
4	Spain	1450
5	Lithuania	1425

Team Pursuit

Rank	after 6 events	Points
1	Germany	3800
2	United States	3350
3	France	3100
4	Belgium	3000
5	Italy	2950

Keirin

Rank	after 6 events	Points
1	(Ukraine) Lyubov Basova	1705
2	(South Korea) Lee Hye-jin	1625
3	(Colombia) Martha Bayona	1520
4	(Germany) Emma Hinze	1325
5	(Canada) Lauriane Genest	1190

Omnium

Rank	after 6 events	Points
1	(United States) Jennifer Valente	1950
2	(Portugal) Maria Martins	1560
3	(Norway) Anita Stenberg	1505
4	(Japan) Yumi Kajihara	1375
5	(Uzbekistan) Olga Zabelinskaya	1290

Madison

Rank	after 6 events	Points
1	Italy	1915
2	Ireland	1635
3	China	1605
4	Australia	1500
5	United States	1425

=== Overall Team Standings ===
Overall team standings are calculated based on total number of points gained by the team's riders in each event.

Rank	Team	(Belarus)	(United Kingdom)	(Hong Kong)	(New Zealand)	(Australia)	(Canada)	Total Points
1	Poland	4521.0	3833.5	2786.0	4781.0	3822.0	2475.0	22218.5
2	France	6297.5	5535.0	901.0	200.0	2030.0	5755.0	20718.5
3	Italy	5077.0	3785.0	3193.0	2705.0	2616.0	2946.0	20322.0
4	Russia	5215.0	3886.0	2712.0	3457.5	3127.0	1627.5	20025.0
5	Germany	4937.5	3985.0	5400.0	350.0	1960.0	2129.5	18762.0
6	Australia		4897.5	6367.5	6562.5		540.0	18367.5
7	New Zealand		375.0	5879.5	6215.0	5790.0		18259.5
8	Netherlands	5765.0	4776.0	4391.0	540.0		2000.0	17472.0
9	Great Britain	6415.0	6555.0	1375.0		1708.5	1395.0	17448.5
10	United States	4890.0	1470.0	667.0	2305.0	2320.0	3881.0	15533.0

== Results ==
=== Men ===
Event	Winner	Second	Third
Belarus, Minsk | 1–3 November 2019
Sprint; Details	Harrie Lavreysen (NED) +0.008/9.970/9.857	Jeffrey Hoogland (NED) 9.874/+0.142/+0.085	Matthijs Büchli (NED) (BEAT Cycling Club); 10.239/REL/10.210
Pursuit; Details	Filippo Ganna (ITA) 4:02.647	John Archibald (GBR) (HUUB Wattbike Test Team) (Overlapped)	Ashton Lambie (USA) 4:11.215
Team Sprint; Details	Netherlands; Jeffrey Hoogland; Harrie Lavreysen; Nils van 't Hoenderdaal; Sam Ligtlee; 42.204	Great Britain; Jack Carlin; Jason Kenny; Ryan Owens 42.590	BEAT Cycling Club; Theo Bos; Matthijs Büchli; Roy van den Berg 43.018
Team Pursuit; Details	Denmark; Lasse Norman Hansen; Julius Johansen; Frederik Rodenberg; Rasmus Pedersen 3:50.207	France; Thomas Denis; Corentin Ermenault; Valentin Tabellion; Benjamin Thomas 3:51.777	Italy; Elia Viviani; Simone Consonni; Filippo Ganna; Francesco Lamon; Davide Plebani; 3:51.689
Keirin; Details	Harrie Lavreysen (NED) 9.715	Denis Dmitriev (RUS) +0.076	Koyu Matsui (JPN) (Japan Professional Cycling Association) +0.342
Omnium; Details	Matthew Walls (GBR); 163 pts	Elia Viviani (ITA); 154 pts	Rui Oliveira (POR); 149 pts
Points Race; Details	Mark Stewart (GBR); 95 pts	Sebastián Mora (ESP); 87 pts	Andreas Graf (AUT); 55 pts
Scratch Race; Details	Yauheni Karaliok (BLR)	Sebastián Mora (ESP)	Eric Young (USA)
Madison; Details	Denmark; Lasse Norman Hansen; Michael Mørkøv; 52 pts	France; Bryan Coquard; Benjamin Thomas; 44 pts	Spain; Albert Torres; Sebastián Mora; 41 pts
Great Britain, Glasgow | 7–10 November 2019
Sprint; Details	Harrie Lavreysen (NED); 9.917/9.906	Jeffrey Hoogland (NED) +0.158/+0.046	Tomohiro Fukaya (JPN); 10.145/10.141
Team Sprint; Details	Netherlands; Jeffrey Hoogland; Harrie Lavreysen; Nils van 't Hoenderdaal; Sam Ligtlee; 42.163	Great Britain; Jack Carlin; Ryan Owens; Joseph Truman; Jason Kenny; 43.515	France; Quentin Caleyron; Melvin Landerneau; Sébastien Vigier; Michaël D'Almeida; 42.813
Team Pursuit; Details	Denmark; Lasse Norman Hansen; Julius Johansen; Frederik Rodenberg; Rasmus Pedersen 3:49.246	Italy; Francesco Lamon; Simone Consonni; Filippo Ganna; Michele Scartezzini; Liam Bertazzo; 3:49.920	France; Benjamin Thomas; Thomas Denis; Corentin Ermenault; Valentin Tabellion 3:52.143
Keirin; Details	Sébastien Vigier (FRA) 10.405	Maximilian Levy (GER) (Team Erdgas.2012) +0.011	Denis Dmitriev (RUS) +0.012
Omnium; Details	Benjamin Thomas (FRA); 130 pts	Mark Stewart (GBR); 109 pts	Francesco Lamon (ITA); 106 pts
Scratch Race; Details	Felix English (IRL)	Sebastián Mora (ESP)	Maximilian Beyer (GER)
Madison; Details	France; Benjamin Thomas; Donavan Grondin; 96 pts	Great Britain; Ethan Hayter; Oliver Wood; 86 pts	Australia; Sam Welsford; Leigh Howard; 84 pts
Hong Kong | 29 Nov–1 December 2019
Sprint; Details	Harrie Lavreysen (NED); 9.926/10.156	Jeffrey Hoogland (NED) +0.013/+0.117	Tomohiro Fukaya (JPN); 10.144/9.948
Team Sprint; Details	Netherlands; Jeffrey Hoogland; Harrie Lavreysen; Roy van den Berg; 42.271	Germany; Timo Bichler; Stefan Bötticher; Eric Engler; 43.436	France; Grégory Baugé; Michaël D'Almeida; Rayan Helal; 43.395
Team Pursuit; Details	Germany; Felix Groß; Theo Reinhardt; Leon Rohde; Domenic Weinstein 3:51.984	New Zealand; Tom Sexton; Dylan Kennett; Nicholas Kergozou; Corbin Strong; Campbell Stewart; 3:52.655	Switzerland; Théry Schir; Valère Thiébaud; Cyrille Thièry; Alex Vogel 3:55.851
Keirin; Details	Callum Saunders (NZL) 10.199	Jason Kenny (GBR) +0.043	Matthijs Büchli (NED) (BEAT Cycling Club) +0.058
Omnium; Details	Campbell Stewart (NZL); 142 pts	Roger Kluge (GER); 133 pts	Théry Schir (SUI); 125 pts
Scratch Race; Details	Roy Eefting (NED)	Christos Volikakis (GRE)	Corbin Strong (NZL)
Madison; Details	Germany; Roger Kluge; Theo Reinhardt; 52 pts	New Zealand; Tom Sexton; Campbell Stewart; 38 pts	Great Britain; Mark Stewart; Fred Wright; 33 pts
New Zealand, Cambridge | 6–8 December 2019
Sprint; Details	Mateusz Rudyk (POL); 10.039/10.120	Tomohiro Fukaya (JPN) +0.095/+0.068	Yudai Nitta (JPN); 10.068/10.370
Team Sprint; Details	Japan; Kazuki Amagai; Tomohiro Fukaya; Yudai Nitta 42.790	Poland; Maciej Bielecki; Patryk Rajkowski; Mateusz Rudyk; Krzysztof Maksel; 43.286	New Zealand; Eddie Dawkins; Ethan Mitchell; Sam Webster 43.367
Team Pursuit; Details	Switzerland; Robin Froidevaux; Claudio Imhof; Stefan Bissegger; Lukas Rüegg; Mauro Schmid; 3:50.359	Australia; Sam Welsford; Leigh Howard; Alexander Porter; Cameron Scott; Kelland O'Brien; 3:52.412	New Zealand; Aaron Gate; Regan Gough; Dylan Kennett; Jordan Kerby; Nicholas Kergozou; 3:50.712
Keirin; Details	Azizulhasni Awang (MAS) 9.853	Shane Perkins (RUS) (Gazprom–RusVelo) +0.171	Matthew Glaetzer (AUS) +0.250
Omnium; Details	Campbell Stewart (NZL); 142 pts	Cameron Meyer (AUS); 133 pts	Artyom Zakharov (KAZ); 129 pts
Scratch Race; Details	Roman Gladysh (UKR)	Roy Eefting (NED)	Christos Volikakis (GRE)
Madison; Details	New Zealand; Aaron Gate; Campbell Stewart; 129 pts	Australia; Kelland O'Brien; Cameron Meyer; 87 pts	Italy; Michele Scartezzini; Francesco Lamon; 57 pts
Australia, Brisbane | 13–15 December 2019
Sprint; Details	Mateusz Rudyk (POL); 10.163/10.170	Sam Webster (NZL) +0.032/+0.579	Matthew Glaetzer (AUS); 10.407/10.160
Team Sprint; Details	Japan; Tomohiro Fukaya; Yoshitaku Nagasako; Yudai Nitta 42.912	Poland; Maciej Bielecki; Krzysztof Maksel; Mateusz Rudyk; Patryk Rajkowski; 45.408	New Zealand; Samuel Dakin; Ethan Mitchell; Sam Webster 43.406
Team Pursuit; Details	Australia; Sam Welsford; Leigh Howard; Kelland O'Brien; Alexander Porter; Luke Plapp; 3:49.776	New Zealand; Campbell Stewart; Jordan Kerby; Tom Sexton; Corbin Strong; Regan Gough; 3:53.601	Switzerland; Robin Froidevaux; Claudio Imhof; Stefan Bissegger; Mauro Schmid 3:50.495
Keirin; Details	Kevin Quintero (COL); 10.159	Matthew Glaetzer (AUS) +0.033	Tomáš Bábek (CZE) +0.459
Omnium; Details	Aaron Gate (NZL) 134 pts	Roger Kluge (GER) 116 pts	Eiya Hashimoto (JPN) (Team Bridgestone Cycling); 113 pts
Madison; Details	Australia; Sam Welsford; Cameron Meyer; 76 pts	New Zealand; Tom Sexton; Aaron Gate; 60 pts	France; Morgan Kneisky; Kevin Vauquelin; 41 pts
Canada, Milton | 23–26 January 2020
Sprint; Details	Mateusz Rudyk (POL); 10.388/10.290	Quentin Caleyron (FRA) +0.081/+0.123	Rayan Helal (FRA); 10.581/10.343
Team Sprint; Details	France; Quentin Caleyron; Florian Grengbo; Quentin Lafargue 43.921	Poland; Maciej Bielecki; Krzysztof Maksel; Mateusz Rudyk; Rafał Sarnecki; 45.458	China; Guo Shuai; Luo Yongjia; Zhang Miao 44.209
Team Pursuit; Details	France; Benjamin Thomas; Thomas Denis; Corentin Ermenault; Kevin Vauquelin; Valentin Tabellion	Italy; Davide Boscaro; Carloalberto Giordani; Giulio Masotto; Gidas Umbri; Stefano Moro (Overlapped)	Canada; Jackson Kinniburgh; Evan Burtnik; Chris Ernst; Amiel Flett-Brown; Sean Richardson; 4:00.945
Keirin; Details	Joachim Eilers (GER); 10.091	Kevin Quintero (COL) +0.095	Rafał Sarnecki (POL) +0.121
Omnium; Details	Jan-Willem van Schip (NED); 150 pts	Daniel Staniszewski (POL); 137 pts	Gavin Hoover (USA); 134 pts
Madison; Details	Netherlands; Yoeri Havik; Jan-Willem van Schip; 76 pts	Great Britain; Ethan Hayter; Oliver Wood; 50 pts	France; Donavan Grondin; Benjamin Thomas; 38 pts

=== Women ===
Event	Winner	Second	Third
Belarus, Minsk | 1–3 November 2019
Sprint; Details	Lee Wai Sze (HKG); 10.948/11.341	Anastasia Voynova (RUS) +0.012/+0.175	Emma Hinze (GER); 11.011/11.218
Team Sprint; Details	Gazprom–RusVelo; Ekaterina Rogovaya; Daria Shmeleva; 32.945	Russia; Natalia Antonova; Ekaterina Gnidenko; 33.262	Team Erdgas.2012; Lea Friedrich; Pauline Grabosch; 33.016
Team Pursuit; Details	United States; Jennifer Valente; Christina Birch; Chloé Dygert; Emma White 4:13.762	Germany; Franziska Brauße; Lisa Brennauer; Lisa Klein; Gudrun Stock; Mieke Kröger; 4:14.836	Italy; Letizia Paternoster; Martina Alzini; Elisa Balsamo; Marta Cavalli; Vittoria Guazzini; 4:16.430
Keirin; Details	Emma Hinze (GER); 11.174	Mathilde Gros (FRA) +0.098	Not awarded
Keirin; Details	Emma Hinze (GER); 11.174	Lee Hye-jin (KOR) +0.098	Not awarded
Omnium; Details	Jennifer Valente (USA); 130 pts	Letizia Paternoster (ITA); 116 pts	Laura Kenny (GBR); 108 pts
Points Race; Details	Jennifer Valente (USA); 66 pts	Maria Giulia Confalonieri (ITA); 38 pts	Tatsiana Sharakova (BLR); 35 pts
Scratch Race; Details	Kirsten Wild (NED)	Martina Fidanza (ITA)	Jennifer Valente (USA)
Madison; Details	Netherlands; Kirsten Wild; Amy Pieters; 50 pts	Great Britain; Laura Kenny; Emily Nelson; 44 pts	France; Clara Copponi; Marie Le Net; 35 pts
Great Britain, Glasgow | 7–10 November 2019
Sprint; Details	Lee Wai Sze (HKG); 11.217/11.170	Emma Hinze (GER) +0.054/+0.019	Olena Starikova (UKR); 11.441/11.276
Team Sprint; Details	Russia; Ekaterina Rogovaya; Daria Shmeleva 32.789	China; Zhong Tianshi; Zhuang Wei; Zhang Linyin; 32.792	Team Erdgas.2012; Lea Friedrich; Pauline Grabosch 32.953
Team Pursuit; Details	Great Britain; Neah Evans; Katie Archibald; Elinor Barker; Ellie Dickinson 4:12.244	Germany; Franziska Brauße; Lisa Brennauer; Lisa Klein; Gudrun Stock; Mieke Kröger; 4:14.522	Italy; Vittoria Guazzini; Chiara Consonni; Simona Frapporti; Silvia Valsecchi 4:19.469
Keirin; Details	Katy Marchant (GBR) 11.409	Emma Hinze (GER) (Team Erdgas.2012) +0.002	Mathilde Gros (FRA) +0.111
Omnium; Details	Kirsten Wild (NED); 121 pts	Olga Zabelinskaya (UZB); 115 pts	Annette Edmondson (AUS); 111 pts
Scratch Race; Details	Karolina Karasiewicz (POL)	Anastasia Chulkova (RUS) (Israel Cycling Academy Track)	Diana Klimova (RUS)
Madison; Details	Australia; Annette Edmondson; Georgia Baker; 40 pts	Great Britain; Katie Archibald; Elinor Barker; 31 pts	Netherlands; Kirsten Wild; Amy Pieters; 19 pts
Hong Kong | 29 Nov–1 December 2019
Sprint; Details	Lee Wai Sze (HKG) 11.131/11.107	Emma Hinze (GER) +0.031/+0.115	Kelsey Mitchell (CAN) (P2m); 11.390/+0.013/+11.363
Team Sprint; Details	Germany; Pauline Grabosch; Emma Hinze 32.564	China; Lin Junhong; Zhong Tianchi; Chen Feifei; 32.784	China National Track Stars; Zhang Linyin; Zhuang Wei 33.065
Team Pursuit; Details	New Zealand; Michaela Drummond; Emily Shearman; Nicole Shields; Ally Wollaston; Jessie Hodges; 4:19.653	Belgium; Jolien D'Hoore; Lotte Kopecky; Shari Bossuyt; Annelies Dom; Gilke Croket; 4:20.497	South Korea; Jang Su-ji; Kang Hyun-kyung; Lee Ju-mi; Na Ah-reum 4:27.617
Keirin; Details	Lee Hye-jin (KOR) 11.765	Lyubov Basova (UKR) +0.073	Yuka Kobayashi (JPN) (Dream Seeker Racing Team) +0.089
Omnium; Details	Yumi Kajihara (JPN); 113 pts (Fin. 6)	Maria Martins (POR); 113 pts (Fin.8)	Jolien D'Hoore (BEL); 106 pts (Fin. 3)
Scratch Race; Details	Anita Stenberg (NOR)	Verena Eberhardt (AUT)	Maria Martins (POR)
Madison; Details	Denmark; Julie Leth; Trine Schmidt; 31 pts	New Zealand; Nicole Shields; Jessie Hodges; 24 pts	Italy; Vittoria Guazzini; Chiara Consonni; 18 pts
New Zealand, Cambridge | 6–8 December 2019
Sprint; Details	Anastasia Voynova (RUS) +0.007/11.197/11.329	Kelsey Mitchell (CAN) (P2m); 11.297/+0.765/+0.019	Stephanie Morton (AUS) 11.393/11.374
Team Sprint; Details	New Zealand; Natasha Hansen; Olivia Podmore; 32.877	Poland; Marlena Karwacka; Urszula Łoś; 32.899	Gazprom–RusVelo; Ekaterina Rogovaya; Daria Shmeleva; 33.032
Team Pursuit; Details	New Zealand; Rushlee Buchanan; Holly Edmondston; Bryony Botha; Kirstie James; Jaime Nielsen; 4:10.705	Australia; Georgia Baker; Annette Edmondson; Ashlee Ankudinoff; Maeve Plouffe; Alexandra Manly; 4:12.460	Canada; Allison Beveridge; Jasmin Duehring; Annie Foreman-Mackey; Georgia Simmerling 4:18.169
Keirin; Details	Lee Hye-jin (KOR); 11.055	Lauriane Genest (CAN) +0.112	Stephanie Morton (AUS) +0.222
Omnium; Details	Yumi Kajihara (JPN); 129 pts	Jennifer Valente (USA); 118 pts	Allison Beveridge (CAN); 111 pts
Scratch Race; Details	Holly Edmondston (NZL)	Olga Zabelinskaya (UZB)	Lydia Gurley (IRL)
Madison; Details	Australia; Georgia Baker; Alexandra Manly; 42 pts	Poland; Daria Pikulik; Nikol Płosaj; 32 pts	Subway New Zealand Track Team; Michaela Drummond; Jessie Hodges; 19 pts
Australia, Brisbane | 13–15 December 2019
Sprint; Details	Lee Wai Sze (HKG); 11.303/11.239	Stephanie Morton (AUS) +0.164/+0.117	Anastasia Voynova (RUS); 11.331/11.392
Team Sprint; Details	Poland; Marlena Karwacka; Urszula Łoś; 33.029	Russia; Ekaterina Rogovaya; Anastasia Voynova; 33.029	Australia; Stephanie Morton; Caitlin Ward; 33.164
Team Pursuit; Details	Australia; Georgia Baker; Annette Edmondson; Ashlee Ankudinoff; Maeve Plouffe; Alexandra Manly; 4:13.237	New Zealand; Rushlee Buchanan; Holly Edmondston; Bryony Botha; Racquel Sheath; Michaela Drummond; 4:13.553	Canada; Allison Beveridge; Jasmin Duehring; Annie Foreman-Mackey; Georgia Simmerling; Ariane Bonhomme; 4:17.509
Keirin; Details	Martha Bayona (COL); 11.364	Stephanie Morton (AUS) +0.057	Nicky Degrendele (BEL) +0.081
Omnium; Details	Jennifer Valente (USA); 139 pts	Allison Beveridge (CAN); 127 pts	Holly Edmondston (NZL); 100 pts
Madison; Details	Australia; Georgia Baker; Annette Edmondson; 56 pts	France; Clara Copponi; Marie Le Net; 51 pts	United States; Kendall Ryan; Christina Birch; 32 pts
Canada, Milton | 23–26 January 2020
Sprint; Details	Laurine van Riessen (NED); 11.326/11.467	Kelsey Mitchell (CAN) +0.089/+0.147	Madalyn Godby (USA); 11.848/+0.146/11.529
Team Sprint; Details	Canada; Lauriane Genest; Kelsey Mitchell; 33.012	Poland; Marlena Karwacka; Urszula Łoś; 33.285	Lithuania; Simona Krupeckaitė; Miglė Marozaitė; 33.562
Team Pursuit; Details	United States; Jennifer Valente; Chloé Dygert; Emma White; Lily Williams	France; Clara Copponi; Coralie Demay; Valentine Fortin; Marie Le Net (Overlapped)	Canada; Devaney Collier; Erin J Attwell; Miriam Brouwer; Kinley Gibson; 4:24.234
Keirin; Details	Laurine van Riessen (NED); 11.231	Helena Casas (ESP) +0.094	Madalyn Godby (USA) +0.134
Omnium; Details	Jennifer Valente (USA); 134 pts	Letizia Paternoster (ITA); 114 pts	Emily Kay (IRL); 102 pts
Madison; Details	Great Britain; Neah Evans; Laura Kenny; 30 pts	Belgium; Jolien D'Hoore; Lotte Kopecky; 28 pts	United States; Megan Jastrab; Jennifer Valente; 24 pts

== Medal table ==
Rank	Team	Gold	Silver	Bronze	Total
1	Netherlands	15	4	1	20
2	New Zealand	9	7	5	21
3	Australia	6	7	7	20
4	United States	6	1	8	15
5	Germany	5	8	2	15
5	Great Britain	5	8	2	15
7	Poland	5	7	1	13
8	France	5	6	8	19
9	Japan	4	1	3	8
10	Denmark	4	0	0	4
10	Hong Kong	4	0	0	4
12	Russia	2	4	3	9
13	South Korea	2	1	1	4
14	Colombia	2	1	0	3
15	Italy	1	7	6	14
16	Canada	1	3	5	9
17	Gazprom–RusVelo	1	1	1	3
17	Ukraine	1	1	1	3
19	Switzerland	1	0	3	4
20	Ireland	1	0	2	3
21	Belarus	1	0	1	2
22	Malaysia	1	0	0	1
22	Norway	1	0	0	1
24	Spain	0	4	1	5
25	Belgium	0	2	2	4
26	China	0	2	1	3
27	Uzbekistan	0	2	0	2
28	Portugal	0	1	2	3
28	Team Erdgas.2012	0	1	2	3
30	Austria	0	1	1	2
30	Greece	0	1	1	2
30	P2m	0	1	1	2
33	HUUB Wattbike Test Team	0	1	0	1
33	Israel Cycling Academy Track	0	1	0	1
35	BEAT Cycling Club	0	0	3	3
36	China National Track Stars	0	0	1	1
36	Czech Republic	0	0	1	1
36	Dream Seeker Racing Team	0	0	1	1
36	Japan Professional Cyclist Association	0	0	1	1
36	Kazakhstan	0	0	1	1
36	Lithuania	0	0	1	1
36	Subway New Zealand Track Team	0	0	1	1
36	Team Bridgestone Cycling	0	0	1	1
Totals (43 entries)		83	84	82	249
