= 2019 UCI Track Cycling World Championships – Women's individual pursuit =

Women's individual pursuit at the 2019 UCI Track Cycling World Championships
- Venue: BGŻ Arena
- Location: Pruszków, Poland
- Dates: 2 March
- Competitors: 20 from 12 nations
- Winning time: 3:25.971

Medalists
gold medal	Ashlee Ankudinoff	Australia
silver medal	Lisa Brennauer	Germany
bronze medal	Lisa Klein	Germany

The Women's individual pursuit competition at the 2019 UCI Track Cycling World Championships was held on 2 March 2019.

== Results ==
=== Qualifying ===
The qualifying was started at 14:17. The first two racers raced for gold, the third and fourth fastest rider raced for the bronze medal.

Rank	Name	Nation	Time	Behind	Notes
1	Lisa Brennauer	Germany	3:25.697		Q
2	Ashlee Ankudinoff	Australia	3:25.921	+0.224	Q
3	Lisa Klein	Germany	3:27.670	+1.973	q
4	Kirstie James	New Zealand	3:28.407	+2.710	q
5	Bryony Botha	New Zealand	3:29.281	+3.584	
6	Annie Foreman-Mackey	Canada	3:30.864	+5.167	
7	Franziska Brauße	Germany	3:31.252	+5.555	
8	Ellie Dickinson	Great Britain	3:34.149	+8.452	
9	Justyna Kaczkowska	Poland	3:35.635	+9.938	
10	Emily Nelson	Great Britain	3:36.563	+10.866	
11	Tatsiana Sharakova	Belarus	3:37.170	+11.473	
12	Silvia Valsecchi	Italy	3:37.338	+11.641	
13	Kim You-ri	South Korea	3:38.013	+12.316	
14	Marie Le Net	France	3:38.503	+12.806	
15	Simona Frapporti	Italy	3:39.018	+13.321	
16	Aksana Salauyeva	Belarus	3:40.743	+15.046	
17	Lee Ju-mi	South Korea	3:41.027	+15.330	
18	Ma Menglu	China	3:41.116	+15.419	
19	Marion Borras	France	3:42.681	+16.984	
20	Yang Qianyu	Hong Kong	3:48.631	+22.934	

=== Finals ===
The finals were started at 19:07.

Rank	Name	Nation	Time	Behind
Gold medal race
1st place, gold medalist(s)	Ashlee Ankudinoff	Australia	3:25.971	
2nd place, silver medalist(s)	Lisa Brennauer	Germany	3:29.243	+3.263
Bronze medal race
3rd place, bronze medalist(s)	Lisa Klein	Germany	3:29.473	
4	Kirstie James	New Zealand	3:34.188	+4.715
