= Cycling at the 2020 Summer Olympics – Women's team pursuit =

Olympic cycling event

Women's team pursuit at the Games of the XXXII Olympiad
- Olympic track cycling
- Venues: Izu Velodrome
- Dates: 2–3 August 2021
- Competitors: 38 from 8 nations
- Teams: 8
- Winning time: 4:04.249 WR

Medalists
1st place, gold medalist(s)		Franziska Brauße; Lisa Brennauer; Lisa Klein; Mieke Kröger	Germany
2nd place, silver medalist(s)		Katie Archibald; Laura Kenny; Neah Evans; Josie Knight; Elinor Barker	Great Britain
3rd place, bronze medalist(s)		Megan Jastrab; Jennifer Valente; Chloé Dygert; Emma White; Lily Williams	United States

The women's team pursuit event at the 2020 Summer Olympics took place on 2 and 3 August 2021 at the Izu Velodrome. 32 cyclists (8 teams of 4) from 8 nations competed.

== Background ==
This will be the 3rd appearance of the event, which has been held at every Summer Olympics since its introduction in 2012.

The reigning Olympic champions are Katie Archibald, Laura Kenny, Elinor Barker, and Joanna Rowsell Shand of Great Britain; Great Britain has won both prior Olympic events (with Kenny and Rowsell Shand on both teams). The reigning (2020) World Champions are Jennifer Valente, Chloé Dygert, Emma White, and Lily Williams of the United States. Barker and Archibald were on the British 2020 World Championships silver medal team; Dygert and Valente were on the American 2016 Olympic silver medal team.

Russia, Germany, China, Great Britain, Australia, and the Netherlands are traditionally strong track cycling nations.

== Qualification ==
A National Olympic Committee (NOC) could enter up to 1 team of 4 cyclists in the team pursuit. Quota places are allocated to the NOC, which selects the cyclists. Qualification is entirely through the 2018–20 UCI nation rankings. The eight top nations in the rankings qualify for the team pursuit event. These nations also automatically qualified a team in the Madison. Because qualification was complete by the end of the 2020 UCI Track Cycling World Championships on 1 March 2020 (the last event that contributed to the 2018–20 rankings), qualification was unaffected by the COVID-19 pandemic.

== Competition format ==
A team pursuit race involves two teams of four cyclists. Each team starts at opposite sides of the track. There are two ways to win: finish 16 laps (4 km) before the other team does or catch the other team. The time for each team is determined by the third cyclist to cross the finish line; the fourth cyclist does not need to finish.

The tournament consists of three rounds:

- Qualifying round: Each team does a time trial for seeding. Only the top 4 teams are able to compete for the gold medal; the 5th place and lower teams can do no better than bronze.
- First round: Four heats of 2 teams each. The top 4 teams are seeded against each other (1 vs. 4, 2 vs. 3) while the bottom 4 teams are seeded against each other (5 vs. 8, 6 vs. 7). The winners of the top bracket advance to the gold medal final. The other 6 teams are ranked by time and advance to finals based on those rankings.
- Finals: Four finals, each with 2 teams. There is a gold medal final (gold and silver medals), a bronze medal final (bronze medal and 4th place), and 5th/6th and 7th/8th classification finals.

== Schedule ==
All times are Japan Standard Time (UTC+9)

Date	Time	Round
2 August	15:54	Qualifying
3 August	15:30	First round
3 August	17:05	Finals

== Results ==
=== Qualifying ===
Rank	Country	Cyclists	Result	Notes
1	Germany	Franziska Brauße; Lisa Brennauer; Lisa Klein; Mieke Kröger	4:07.307	WR
2	Great Britain	Katie Archibald; Laura Kenny; Elinor Barker; Josie Knight	4:09.022	
3	United States	Jennifer Valente; Chloé Dygert; Emma White; Lily Williams	4:10.118	
4	Italy	Elisa Balsamo; Letizia Paternoster; Rachele Barbieri; Vittoria Guazzini	4:11.666	
5	France	Victoire Berteau; Marion Borras; Valentine Fortin; Marie Le Net	4:12.502	
6	New Zealand	Holly Edmondston; Bryony Botha; Kirstie James; Jaime Nielsen	4:12.536	
7	Australia	Georgia Baker; Annette Edmondson; Ashlee Ankudinoff; Alexandra Manly	4:13.571	
8	Canada	Allison Beveridge; Jasmin Duehring; Annie Foreman-Mackey; Georgia Simmerling	4:15.832	

=== First round ===
Rank	Heat	Country	Cyclists	Result	Notes
1	4	Germany	Franziska Brauße; Lisa Brennauer; Lisa Klein; Mieke Kröger	4:06.159	QG, WR
2	3	Great Britain	Katie Archibald; Laura Kenny; Neah Evans; Josie Knight	4:06.748	QG
3	3	United States	Megan Jastrab; Jennifer Valente; Chloé Dygert; Emma White	4:07.562	QB
4	2	Canada	Allison Beveridge; Ariane Bonhomme; Annie Foreman-Mackey; Georgia Simmerling	4:09.249	QB
5	1	Australia	Georgia Baker; Annette Edmondson; Ashlee Ankudinoff; Maeve Plouffe	4:09.992	
6	4	Italy	Elisa Balsamo; Letizia Paternoster; Rachele Barbieri; Vittoria Guazzini	4:10.063	
7	1	New Zealand	Holly Edmondston; Bryony Botha; Rushlee Buchanan; Jaime Nielsen	4:10.223	
8	2	France	Marion Borras; Coralie Demay; Valentine Fortin; Marie Le Net	4:11.888	

=== Finals ===
Rank	Country	Cyclists	Result	Notes
Gold medal final
1st place, gold medalist(s)	Germany	Franziska Brauße; Lisa Brennauer; Lisa Klein; Mieke Kröger	4:04.242	WR
2nd place, silver medalist(s)	Great Britain	Katie Archibald; Laura Kenny; Neah Evans; Josie Knight	4:10.607	
Bronze medal final
3rd place, bronze medalist(s)	United States	Megan Jastrab; Jennifer Valente; Chloé Dygert; Emma White	4:08.040	
4	Canada	Allison Beveridge; Ariane Bonhomme; Annie Foreman-Mackey; Georgia Simmerling	4:10.552	
Fifth place final
5	Australia	Georgia Baker; Annette Edmondson; Ashlee Ankudinoff; Maeve Plouffe	4:11.041	
6	Italy	Elisa Balsamo; Letizia Paternoster; Martina Alzini; Vittoria Guazzini	4:11.108	
Seventh place final
7	France	Victoire Berteau; Marion Borras; Valentine Fortin; Marie Le Net	4:10.388	
8	New Zealand	Holly Edmondston; Bryony Botha; Kirstie James; Jaime Nielsen	4:10.600	
