= 2019 UCI Track Cycling World Championships – Women's team pursuit =

Women's team pursuit at the 2019 UCI Track Cycling World Championships
- Venue: BGŻ Arena
- Location: Pruszków, Poland
- Dates: 27–28 February
- Competitors: 71 from 17 nations
- Teams: 17
- Winning time: 4:14.333

Medalists
gold medal	Annette Edmondson; Ashlee Ankudinoff; Georgia Baker; Amy Cure; Alexandra Manly	Australia
silver medal	Laura Kenny; Katie Archibald; Elinor Barker; Ellie Dickinson	Great Britain
bronze medal	Kirstie James; Holly Edmondston; Bryony Botha; Michaela Drummond; Rushlee Buchanan	New Zealand

The Women's team pursuit competition at the 2019 UCI Track Cycling World Championships was held on 27 and 28 February 2019.

== Results ==
=== Qualifying ===
The qualifying was started on 27 February at 13:00. The eight fastest teams advanced to the first round.

Rank	Nation	Time	Behind	Notes
1	Australia; Annette Edmondson; Ashlee Ankudinoff; Georgia Baker; Amy Cure	4:14.915		Q
2	Great Britain; Laura Kenny; Katie Archibald; Elinor Barker; Ellie Dickinson	4:15.618	+0.703	Q
3	New Zealand; Rushlee Buchanan; Bryony Botha; Holly Edmondston; Kirstie James	4:19.065	+4.150	Q
4	Italy; Letizia Paternoster; Martina Alzini; Elisa Balsamo; Vittoria Guazzini	4:20.065	+5.150	Q
5	Canada; Allison Beveridge; Ariane Bonhomme; Annie Foreman-Mackey; Georgia Simmerling	4:20.650	+5.735	q
6	Germany; Charlotte Becker; Franziska Brauße; Lisa Brennauer; Lisa Klein	4:24.568	+9.653	q
7	United States; Jennifer Valente; Christina Birch; Kimberly Geist; Emma White	4:25.384	+10.469	q
8	Belgium; Lotte Kopecky; Shari Bossuyt; Jolien D'Hoore; Annelies Dom	4:25.825	+10.910	q
9	France; Coralie Demay; Marion Borras; Clara Copponi; Pascale Jeuland	4:27.560	+12.645	
10	Ireland; Mia Griffin; Kelly Murphy; Alice Sharpe; Orla Walsh	4:29.148	+14.233	
11	Japan; Yumi Kajihara; Kie Furuyama; Kisato Nakamura; Miho Yoshikawa	4:30.76	+15.845	
12	Belarus; Ina Savenka; Polina Pivovarova; Aksana Salauyeva; Hanna Tserakh	4:31.329	+16.414	
13	Poland; Daria Pikulik; Nikol Płosaj; Justyna Kaczkowska; Łucja Pietrzak	4:32.420	+17.505	
14	South Korea; Kim Hyun-ji; Kim You-ri; Lee Ju-mi; Na Ah-reum	4:33.074	+18.159	
15	China; Wang Xiaofei; Huang Zhilin; Liu Jiali; Ma Menglu	4:33.634	+18.719	
16	Russia; Aleksandra Goncharova; Anastasia Chursina; Tamara Dronova; Daria Malkova	4:33.919	+19.004	
17	Ukraine; Hanna Solovey; Oksana Kliachina; Tetyana Klimchenko; Anna Nahirna	4:36.683	+21.768	

=== First round ===
The first round was started on 28 February at 18:30.

First round heats were held as follows:
Heat 1: 6th v 7th fastest
Heat 2: 5th v 8th fastest
Heat 3: 2nd v 3rd fastest
Heat 4: 1st v 4th fastest

The winners of heats three and four proceeded to the gold medal race. The remaining six teams were ranked on time, from which the top two proceeded to the bronze medal race.

Rank	Heat	Nation	Time	Behind	Notes
1	1	Germany; Gudrun Stock; Franziska Brauße; Lisa Brennauer; Lisa Klein	4:21.252		
2	1	United States; Jennifer Valente; Christina Birch; Kimberly Geist; Emma White	4:23.721	+2.469	
1	2	Canada; Allison Beveridge; Ariane Bonhomme; Annie Foreman-Mackey; Georgia Simmerling	4:17.577		QB
2	2	Belgium; Lotte Kopecky; Shari Bossuyt; Jolien D'Hoore; Annelies Dom	4:23.953	+6.376	
1	3	Great Britain; Laura Kenny; Katie Archibald; Elinor Barker; Ellie Dickinson	4:14.067		QG
2	3	New Zealand; Rushlee Buchanan; Bryony Botha; Holly Edmondston; Kirstie James	4:17.980	+3.913	QB
1	4	Australia; Alexandra Manly; Ashlee Ankudinoff; Georgia Baker; Amy Cure	4:13.913		QG
2	4	Italy; Letizia Paternoster; Martina Alzini; Elisa Balsamo; Vittoria Guazzini	4:18.528	+4.615	

- QG = qualified for gold medal final
- QB = qualified for bronze medal final

=== Finals ===
The finals were started on 28 February at 20:48.

Rank	Nation	Time	Behind	Notes
Gold medal race
1st place, gold medalist(s)	Australia; Annette Edmondson; Ashlee Ankudinoff; Georgia Baker; Amy Cure	4:14.333		
2nd place, silver medalist(s)	Great Britain; Laura Kenny; Katie Archibald; Elinor Barker; Ellie Dickinson	4:14.537	+0.204	
Bronze medal race
3rd place, bronze medalist(s)	New Zealand; Michaela Drummond; Bryony Botha; Holly Edmondston; Kirstie James	4:16.479		
4	Canada; Allison Beveridge; Ariane Bonhomme; Annie Foreman-Mackey; Georgia Simmerling	4:20.321	+3.842	
