= Kirstie James =

New Zealand cyclist (born 1989)

Kirstie Klingenberg
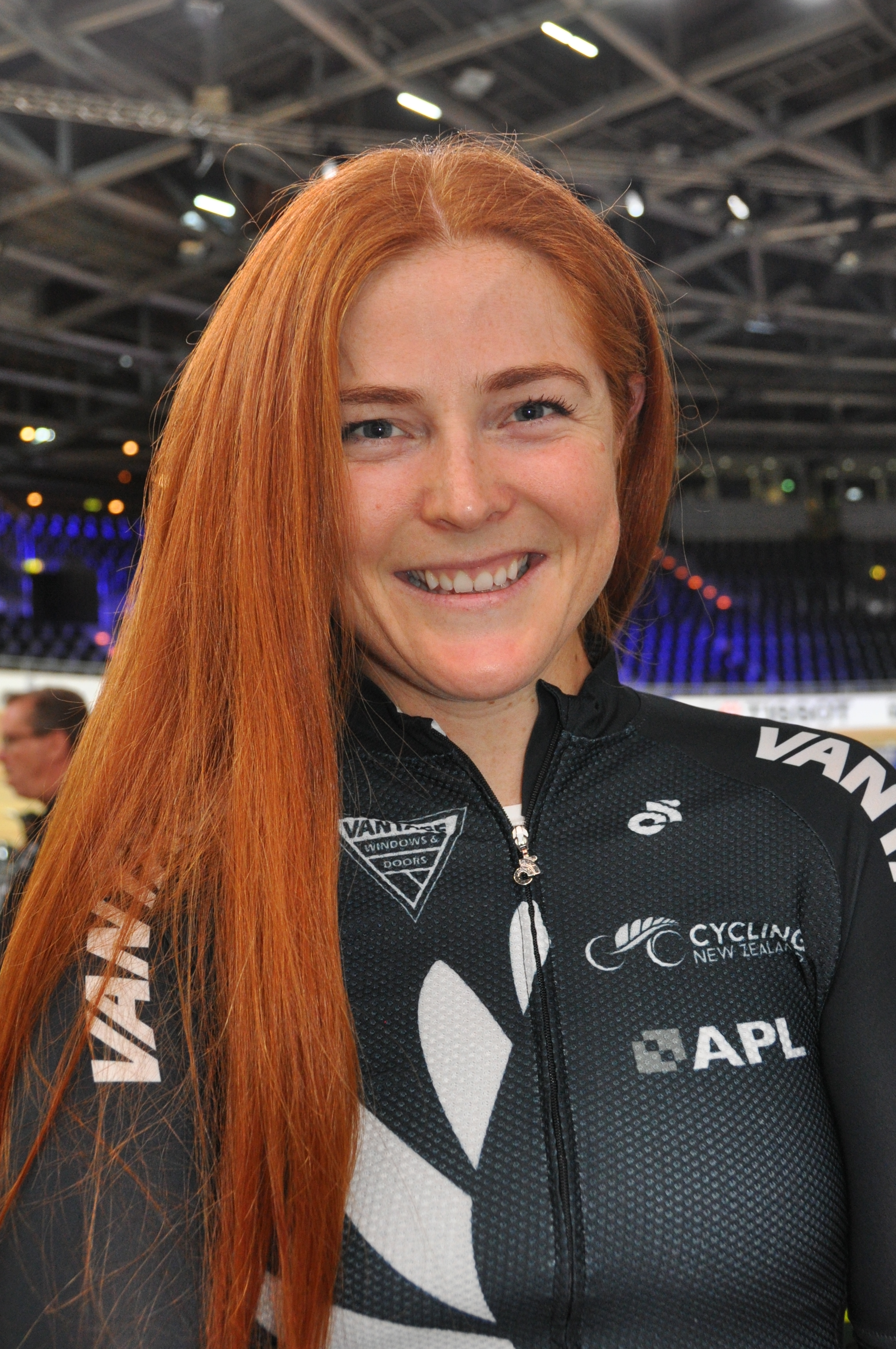
- Kirstie James (2020)

Personal information
- Born: 25 May 1989 (age 37) Auckland, New Zealand

Cycling career
- Sport: Cycling
- Current team: The Meteor / Intelligentsia
- Discipline: Track cycling
- Rider type: Endurance

Amateur teams
- Endura Lady Force
- Autoglas Wetteren Cycling Team

Professional teams
- Velo Classic / Stan's No Tubes
- The Meteor / Intelligentsia
Medal record
Women's track cycling
Representing New Zealand
World Championships
Bronze medal – third place	2017 Hong Kong	Team pursuit
Bronze medal – third place	2019 Pruszków	Team pursuit
Commonwealth Games
Silver medal – second place	2018 Gold Coast	Team pursuit

Kirstie Klingenberg (née James, born 25 May 1989) is a New Zealand track cyclist and former rower. She competed at the 2020 Summer Olympics, in Women's sprint, and Women's team pursuit.

She was a competitor in the women's team pursuit event at the 2017 UCI Track Cycling World Championships, where she won a bronze medal. Kirstie competed at the 2018 Commonwealth Games where she won silver in the team pursuit.

Klingenberg started in rowing but switched to cycling in 2012. She was diagnosed with endometriosis in 2016, and is an ambassador for Endometriosis New Zealand.

== Major results ==
2015
Oceania Track Championships, Invercargill, New Zealand

1st Team Pursuit (with Holly Edmondston, Alysha Keith, Elizabeth Steel and Philippa Sutton)
2nd Omnium

2016
Oceania Track Championships, Cambridge, New Zealand

2nd Team Pursuit (with Bryony Botha, Alysha Keith and Nina Wollaston)
3rd Individual Pursuit

2017
2017 UCI Track Cycling World Championships

3rd Team Pursuit (with Racquel Sheath, Rushlee Buchanan, Jaime Nielsen and Michaela Drummond)

Elmhurst Cycling Classic Criterium, Chicago, IL, USA

1st Place

Track Cycling National Championships, Invercargill, New Zealand

1st Scratch Race

UCI Track Cycling World Cup Milton, Canada

2nd Team Pursuit

Uci Track Cycling World Cup Santiago, Chile

1st Team Pursuit

2018
Oceania Cycling Championships, Cambridge, New Zealand

1st Team Pursuit (with Racquel Sheath, Bryony Botha, Rushlee Buchanan and Michaela Drummond)
1st Individual Pursuit
1st Points Race

2018 UCI Track Cycling World Championships, Apdeldoorn, Netherlands

6th Team Pursuit (with Racquel Sheath, Rushlee Buchanan, Bryony Botha and Michaela Drummond)
6th Individual Pursuit

2018 Commonwealth Games, Gold Coast, Australia

2nd Team Pursuit (with Bryony Botha, Racquel Sheath and Rushlee Buchanan)
5th Individual Pursuit
5th Scratch Race 2019

UCI Track Cycling World Cup Paris, France

2nd Team Pursuit UCI Track Cycling World Cup Milton, Canada
3rd Team Pursuit

UCI Track Cycling World Cup Cambridge, New Zealand

1st Team Pursuit

Track Cycling National Championships, Cambridge, New Zealand

1st Individual Pursuit
1st Scratch Race
1st Points Race
2nd Team Pursuit

2019
Oceania Cycling Championships, Cambridge, New Zealand

1st Team Pursuit (with Jessie Hodges, Nicole Sheilds and Emily Shearman)
1st Individual Pursuit

UCI Track Cycling World Cup Cambridge, New Zealand

1st Team Pursuit

Track Cycling National Championships, Cambridge, New Zealand

1st Individual Pursuit

2019 UCI Track Cycling World Championships, Pruskow, Poland

3rd Team Pursuit (with Holly Edmondston, Rushlee Buchanan, Bryony Botha and Michaela Drummond)
4th Individual Pursuit

2020
2020 UCI Track Cycling World Championships, Berlin, Germany

6th Team Pursuit (with Holly Edmondston, Rushlee Buchanan, Bryony Botha and Jaime Nielsen)
