= 2017 UCI Track Cycling World Championships – Women's team pursuit =

Women's team pursuit at the 2017 UCI Track Cycling World Championships
- Venue: Hong Kong Velodrome
- Location: Hong Kong
- Dates: 12–13 April
- Competitors: 61 from 14 nations
- Teams: 14
- Winning time: 4:19.413

Medalists
gold medal	Kelly Catlin; Chloé Dygert; Kimberly Geist; Jennifer Valente	United States
silver medal	Amy Cure; Ashlee Ankudinoff; Alexandra Manly; Rebecca Wiasak	Australia
bronze medal	Racquel Sheath; Rushlee Buchanan; Kirstie James; Jaime Nielsen; Michaela Drummond	New Zealand

The Women's team pursuit competition at the 2017 World Championships was held on 12 and 13 April 2017.

== Results ==
=== Qualifying ===
The fastest eight teams qualified for the first round, from which the top four remained in contention for the gold medal final and the other four for the bronze medal final.

Rank	Name	Nation	Time	Behind	Notes
1	Kelly Catlin; Chloé Dygert; Kimberly Geist; Jennifer Valente	United States	4:17.722		Q
2	Amy Cure; Ashlee Ankudinoff; Alexandra Manly; Rebecca Wiasak	Australia	4:18.659	+0.937	Q
3	Stephanie Roorda; Jasmin Duehring; Laura Brown; Annie Foreman-Mackey	Canada	4:19.515	+1.793	Q
4	Elisa Balsamo; Simona Frapporti; Francesca Pattaro; Silvia Valsecchi	Italy	4:19.838	+2.116	Q
5	Eleanor Dickinson; Emily Kay; Manon Lloyd; Emily Nelson	Great Britain	4:21.548	+3.826	q
6	Michaela Drummond; Racquel Sheath; Rushlee Buchanan; Jaime Nielsen	New Zealand	4:22.776	+5.054	q
7	Élise Delzenne; Laurie Berthon; Marion Borras; Coralie Demay	France	4:25.788	+8.066	q
8	Daria Pikulik; Natalia Rutkowska; Justyna Kaczkowska; Nikol Płosaj	Poland	4:28.523	+10.801	q
9	Luo Xiaoling; Chen Qiaolin; Chen Siyu; Huang Li	China	4:32.559	+14.837	
10	Lotte Kopecky; Gilke Croket; Annelies Dom; Kaat Van der Meulen	Belgium	4:33.722	+16.000	
11	Minami Uwano; Yuya Hashimoto; Kisato Nakamura; Nao Suzuki	Japan	4:34.362	+16.640	
12	Gulnaz Badykova; Tamara Balabolina; Maria Kantsyber; Lidiya Malakhova	Russia	4:35.657	+17.935	
13	Pang Yao; Yang Qianyu; Diao Xiao Juan; Leung Bo Yee	Hong Kong	4:35.949	+18.227	
14	Tatjana Paller; Charlotte Becker; Franziska Brauße; Gudrun Stock	Germany	4:36.287	+18.565	

- Q = qualified; in contention for gold medal final
- q = qualified; in contention for bronze medal final

=== First round ===
First round heats were held as follows:
Heat 1: 6th v 7th fastest
Heat 2: 5th v 8th fastest
Heat 3: 2nd v 3rd fastest
Heat 4: 1st v 4th fastest

The winners of heats 3 and 4 proceeded to the gold medal final. The remaining 6 teams were ranked on time, from which the top 2 proceeded to the bronze medal final.

Rank	Heat	Name	Nation	Time	Notes
1	4	Kelly Catlin; Chloé Dygert; Kimberly Geist; Jennifer Valente	United States	4:18.716	QG
2	3	Amy Cure; Ashlee Ankudinoff; Alexandra Manly; Rebecca Wiasak	Australia	4:20.041	QG
3	4	Elisa Balsamo; Simona Frapporti; Tatiana Guderzo; Silvia Valsecchi	Italy	4:19.958	QB
4	1	Michaela Drummond; Racquel Sheath; Rushlee Buchanan; Jaime Nielsen	New Zealand	4:20.171	QB
5	2	Elinor Barker; Eleanor Dickinson; Manon Lloyd; Emily Nelson	Great Britain	4:21.681	
6	3	Jasmin Duehring; Laura Brown; Annie Foreman-Mackey; Kirsti Lay	Canada	4:22.446	
7	1	Élise Delzenne; Laurie Berthon; Marion Borras; Coralie Demay	France	4:26.434	
8	2	Daria Pikulik; Natalia Rutkowska; Justyna Kaczkowska; Nikola Rozynska	Poland	4:33.237	

- QG = qualified for gold medal final
- QB = qualified for bronze medal final

=== Finals ===
The final classification was determined in the medal finals.

Rank	Name	Nation	Time	Gap	Notes
Gold medal final
1st place, gold medalist(s)	Kelly Catlin; Chloé Dygert; Kimberly Geist; Jennifer Valente	United States	4:19.413		
2nd place, silver medalist(s)	Amy Cure; Ashlee Ankudinoff; Alexandra Manly; Rebecca Wiasak	Australia	4:19.830	+0.417	
Bronze medal final
3rd place, bronze medalist(s)	Racquel Sheath; Rushlee Buchanan; Kirstie James; Jaime Nielsen	New Zealand	4:21.778		
4	Elisa Balsamo; Simona Frapporti; Francesca Pattaro; Silvia Valsecchi	Italy	4:26.562	+4.784	
