= Cycling at the 2018 Commonwealth Games – Women's team pursuit =

Cycling Track – Women's team pursuit at the 2018 Commonwealth Games
- Venue: Anna Meares Velodrome
- Dates: 5 April
- Competitors: 28 from 7 nations
- Winning time: 4:15.214 GR

Medalists
gold medal	Alexandra Manly; Annette Edmondson; Ashlee Ankudinoff; Amy Cure	Australia
silver medal	Kirstie James; Rushlee Buchanan; Racquel Sheath; Bryony Botha	New Zealand
bronze medal	Allison Beveridge; Annie Foreman-Mackey; Ariane Bonhomme; Stephanie Roorda	Canada

The women's team pursuit at the 2018 Commonwealth Games was part of the cycling programme, which took place on 5 April 2018.

== Records ==
Prior to this competition, the existing world and Games records were as follows:

World record	Great Britain (Joanna Rowsell Shand, Laura Trott, Katie Archibald, Elinor Barker)	4:10.236	Rio de Janeiro, Brazil	13 August 2016
Games record	New event			

== Schedule ==
The schedule is as follows:

All times are Australian Eastern Standard Time (UTC+10)

Date	Time	Round
Thursday 5 April 2018	14:42	Qualifying
Thursday 5 April 2018	19:30 / 19:37	Finals

== Results ==
=== Qualifying ===
The two fastest teams advance to the gold medal final. The next two fastest teams advance to the bronze medal final.

Rank	Nation	Time	Behind	Notes
1	Australia; Ashlee Ankudinoff; Amy Cure; Annette Edmondson; Alexandra Manly	4:17.218	–	QG, GR
2	New Zealand; Bryony Botha; Rushlee Buchanan; Kirstie James; Racquel Sheath	4:22.331	+5.113	QG
3	Canada; Allison Beveridge; Ariane Bonhomme; Annie Foreman-Mackey; Stephanie Roorda	4:22.484	+5.266	QB
4	England; Ellie Dickinson; Emily Kay; Emily Nelson; Rebecca Raybould	4:24.519	+7.301	QB
5	Wales; Megan Barker; Ciara Horne; Manon Lloyd; Jessica Roberts	4:24.825	+7.607	
6	South Africa; Ilze Bole; Charlene du Preez; Adelia Neethling; Elfriede Wolfaardt	4:51.224	+34.006	
7	India; Deborah Herold; Amritha Reghunath; Sonali Mayanglambam; Monorama Devi Tongbram	5:05.668	+48.450	

=== Finals ===
The final classification was determined in the medal finals.

Rank	Nation	Time	Behind	Notes
Bronze medal final
3rd place, bronze medalist(s)	Canada; Allison Beveridge; Ariane Bonhomme; Annie Foreman-Mackey; Stephanie Roorda	4:21.493	–	
4	England; Ellie Dickinson; Emily Kay; Emily Nelson; Rebecca Raybould	4:24.499	+3.006	
Gold medal final
1st place, gold medalist(s)	Australia; Ashlee Ankudinoff; Amy Cure; Annette Edmondson; Alexandra Manly	4:15.214	–	GR
2nd place, silver medalist(s)	New Zealand; Bryony Botha; Rushlee Buchanan; Kirstie James; Racquel Sheath	OVL		
