= Maria Kantsyber =

Russian cyclist

Personal information
- Full name: Maria Kantsyber; Russian: Мария Канцибер
- Born: 21 March 1996 (age 30)

Cycling career
- Sport: Cycling
- Discipline: Road
- Role: Rider

Professional teams
- 2015: Bizkaia–Durango
- 2020: Sestroretsk

Maria Kantsyber (Russian: Мария Канцибер; born 21 March 1996) is a Russian professional racing cyclist, who most recently rode for UCI Women's Continental Team Sestroretsk. She rode in the women's team pursuit event at the 2017 UCI Track Cycling World Championships.
