= Nikola Rozynska =

Polish cyclist

Personal information
- Born: 31 August 1998 (age 28)

Cycling career
- Sport: Cycling
- Role: Rider

Nikola Rozynska (born 31 August 1998) is a Polish professional racing cyclist. She rode in the women's team pursuit event at the 2017 UCI Track Cycling World Championships.
