= 2018 UCI Track Cycling World Championships – Women's omnium =

Women's omnium at the 2018 UCI Track Cycling World Championships
- Venue: Omnisport Apeldoorn
- Location: Apeldoorn, Netherlands
- Dates: 2 March
- Competitors: 24 from 24 nations
- Winning points: 121

Medalists
gold medal	Kirsten Wild	Netherlands
silver medal	Amalie Dideriksen	Denmark
bronze medal	Rushlee Buchanan	New Zealand

The women's omnium competition at the 2018 UCI Track Cycling World Championships was held on 2 March 2018 at the Omnisport Apeldoorn in Apeldoorn, Netherlands.

== Results ==
=== Scratch race ===
The scratch race was started at 14:16.

Rank	Name	Nation	Laps down	Event points
1	Kirsten Wild	Netherlands		40
2	Elisa Balsamo	Italy		38
3	Laurie Berthon	France		36
4	Daria Pikulik	Poland		34
5	Yumi Kajihara	Japan		32
6	Lotte Kopecky	Belgium		30
7	Elinor Barker	Great Britain		28
8	Anita Stenberg	Norway		26
9	Jennifer Valente	United States		24
10	Allison Beveridge	Canada		22
11	Alžbeta Bačíková	Slovakia		20
12	Amalie Dideriksen	Denmark		18
13	Ana Usabiaga	Spain		16
14	Aleksandra Goncharova	Russia		14
15	Rushlee Buchanan	New Zealand		12
16	Andrea Waldis	Switzerland		10
17	Palina Pivavarava	Belarus		8
18	Wang Xiaofei	China		6
19	Lydia Boylan	Ireland		4
20	Olivija Baleišytė	Lithuania		2
21	Gudrun Stock	Germany		1
22	Tetyana Klimchenko	Ukraine		1
23	Jarmila Machačová	Czech Republic		1
–	Diao Xiaojuan	Hong Kong	DNF	0

=== Tempo race ===
The tempo race was started at 16:45.

Rank	Name	Nation	Lap points	Total points
1	Elinor Barker	Great Britain		7
2	Gudrun Stock	Germany		4
3	Wang Xiaofei	China		3
4	Jennifer Valente	United States		2
5	Kirsten Wild	Netherlands		2
6	Amalie Dideriksen	Denmark		2
7	Yumi Kajihara	Japan		2
8	Elisa Balsamo	Italy		2
9	Allison Beveridge	Canada		1
10	Jarmila Machačová	Czech Republic		1
11	Lotte Kopecky	Belgium		0
12	Aleksandra Goncharova	Russia		0
13	Rushlee Buchanan	New Zealand		0
14	Anita Stenberg	Norway		0
15	Lydia Boylan	Ireland		0
16	Ana Usabiaga	Spain		0
17	Palina Pivavarava	Belarus		0
18	Andrea Waldis	Switzerland		0
19	Daria Pikulik	Poland		0
20	Tetyana Klimchenko	Ukraine	−20	−20
21	Laurie Berthon	France	−20	−20
22	Olivija Baleišytė	Lithuania	−20	−20
23	Alžbeta Bačíková	Slovakia	−20	−20
–	Diao Xiaojuan	Hong Kong	DNS	

=== Elimination race ===
The elimination race was started at 19:33.

Rank	Name	Nation
1	Kirsten Wild	Netherlands
2	Jennifer Valente	United States
3	Elisa Balsamo	Italy
4	Amalie Dideriksen	Denmark
5	Lotte Kopecky	Belgium
6	Yumi Kajihara	Japan
7	Elinor Barker	Great Britain
8	Rushlee Buchanan	New Zealand
9	Laurie Berthon	France
10	Ana Usabiaga	Spain
11	Palina Pivavarava	Belarus
12	Anita Stenberg	Norway
13	Gudrun Stock	Germany
14	Andrea Waldis	Switzerland
15	Aleksandra Goncharova	Russia
16	Daria Pikulik	Poland
17	Lydia Boylan	Ireland
18	Olivija Baleišytė	Lithuania
19	Alžbeta Bačíková	Slovakia
20	Jarmila Machačová	Czech Republic
21	Wang Xiaofei	China
22	Allison Beveridge	Canada
23	Tetyana Klimchenko	Ukraine
–	Diao Xiaojuan	Hong Kong

=== Points race and overall standings ===
After all events.

Rank	Name	Nation	Lap points	Sprint points	Total points
1st place, gold medalist(s)	Kirsten Wild	Netherlands	0	9	121
2nd place, silver medalist(s)	Amalie Dideriksen	Denmark	20	10	112
3rd place, bronze medalist(s)	Rushlee Buchanan	New Zealand	40	12	106
4	Elisa Balsamo	Italy	0	5	105
5	Jennifer Valente	United States	0	5	101
6	Elinor Barker	Great Britain	0	1	97
7	Lotte Kopecky	Belgium	0	12	94
8	Yumi Kajihara	Japan	0	3	93
9	Anita Stenberg	Norway	20	8	86
10	Aleksandra Goncharova	Russia	40	2	86
11	Gudrun Stock	Germany	20	6	81
12	Jarmila Machačová	Czech Republic	40	8	73
13	Laurie Berthon	France	0	0	61
14	Palina Pivavarava	Belarus	20	1	57
15	Andrea Waldis	Switzerland	20	5	55
16	Ana Usabiaga	Spain	0	0	48
17	Lydia Boylan	Ireland	0	7	31
18	Olivija Baleišytė	Lithuania	0	5	14
19	Alžbeta Bačíková	Slovakia	−20	0	5
20	Tetyana Klimchenko	Ukraine	0	0	4
–	Daria Pikulik	Poland	DNF		
–	Allison Beveridge	Canada	DNF		
–	Wang Xiaofei	China	DNF		
–	Diao Xiaojuan	Hong Kong	DNF		
