= 2010 UCI Track Cycling World Championships – Women's team pursuit =

Rainbow jersey

The Women's Team Pursuit is one of the 9 women's events at the 2010 UCI Track Cycling World Championships, held in Ballerup, Denmark.

Fifteen teams of 3 cyclists each participated in the contest. After the qualifying, the fastest 2 teams raced for gold, and 3rd and 4th teams raced for bronze.

The Qualifying and the Finals were held on March 25.

== World record ==
World Record
WR	3:21.875	United Kingdom	Manchester (United Kingdom)	1 November 2009

== Qualifying ==
Rank	Name	Nation	Time	Notes
1	Ashlee Ankudinoff; Sarah Kent; Josephine Tomic	Australia	3:23.161	Q
2	Lizzie Armitstead; Wendy Houvenaghel; Joanna Rowsell	Great Britain	3:23.369	Q
3	Rushlee Buchanan; Lauren Ellis; Alison Shanks	New Zealand	3:24.405	Q
4	Dotsie Bausch; Sarah Hammer; Lauren Tamayo	United States	3:24.661	Q
5	Vera Koedooder; Amy Pieters; Ellen van Dijk	Netherlands	3:25.156	NR
6	Laura Brown; Stephanie Roorda; Tara Whitten	Canada	3:26.132	
7	Charlotte Becker; Lisa Brennauer; Verena Joos	Germany	3:27.236	
8	Yelyzaveta Bochkaryova; Svitlana Halyuk; Lesya Kalytovska	Ukraine	3:27.662	
9	Jessie Daams; Jolien D'Hoore; Kelly Druyts	Belgium	3:27.690	
10	Jiang Fan; Jiang Wenwen; Liang Jing	China	3:28.194	
11	Tatiana Antoshina; Anastasia Chulkova; Victoria Kondel	Russia	3:28.644	
12	Edyta Jasińska; Katarzyna Pawłowska; Małgorzata Wojtyra	Poland	3:32.035	
13	Sophie Creux; Fiona Dutriaux; Pascale Jeuland	France	3:32.199	
14	Monia Baccaille; Tatiana Guderzo; Marta Tagliaferro	Italy	3:34.329	
	Svetlana Pauliukaitė; Vilija Sereikaitė; Aušrinė Trebaitė	Lithuania	DSQ	

== Finals ==
Rank	Name	Nation	Time
Gold Medal Race
1st place, gold medalist(s)	Ashlee Ankudinoff; Sarah Kent; Josephine Tomic	Australia	3:21.748
2nd place, silver medalist(s)	Lizzie Armitstead; Wendy Houvenaghel; Joanna Rowsell	Great Britain	3:22.287
Bronze Medal Race
3rd place, bronze medalist(s)	Rushlee Buchanan; Lauren Ellis; Alison Shanks	New Zealand	3:21.552 WR
4	Dotsie Bausch; Sarah Hammer; Lauren Tamayo	United States	3:24.571
