= 2022 UCI Track Cycling World Championships – Women's individual pursuit =

Women's individual pursuit at the 2022 UCI Track Cycling World Championships
- Venue: Vélodrome National
- Location: Saint-Quentin-en-Yvelines, France
- Dates: 15 October
- Competitors: 21 from 15 nations
- Winning time: 3:19.427

Medalists
gold medal	Franziska Brauße	Germany
silver medal	Bryony Botha	New Zealand
bronze medal	Josie Knight	Great Britain

The Women's individual pursuit competition at the 2022 UCI Track Cycling World Championships was held on 15 October 2022.

== Results ==
=== Qualifying ===
The qualifying was started at 14:18. The two fasters riders raced for gold, the third and fourth fastest riders raced for bronze.

Rank	Name	Nation	Time	Behind	Notes
1	Franziska Brauße	Germany	3:18.794		Q
2	Bryony Botha	New Zealand	3:19.378	+0.584	Q
3	Mieke Kröger	Germany	3:19.947	+1.153	q
4	Josie Knight	Great Britain	3:20.792	+1.998	q
5	Anna Morris	Great Britain	3:22.094	+3.300	
6	Maeve Plouffe	Australia	3:25.304	+6.510	
7	Kelly Murphy	Ireland	3:25.424	+6.630	
8	Letizia Paternoster	Italy	3:25.660	+6.866	
9	Daniek Hengeveld	Netherlands	3:27.802	+9.008	
10	Vittoria Guazzini	Italy	3:27.852	+9.058	
11	Marion Borras	France	3:28.212	+9.418	
12	Sarah Van Dam	Canada	3:30.373	+11.579	
13	Fabienne Buri	Switzerland	3:33.242	+14.448	
14	Wang Susu	China	3:33.563	+14.769	
15	Lana Eberle	Germany	3:33.649	+14.855	
16	Marith Vanhove	Belgium	3:35.431	+16.637	
17	Huang Zhilin	China	3:35.981	+17.187	
18	Shayna Powless	United States	3:38.708	+19.914	
19	Ruby West	Canada	3:40.286	+21.492	
20	Ziortza Isasi	Spain	3:42.632	+23.838	
21	Yanina Kuskova	Uzbekistan	3:42.692	+23.898	

=== Finals ===
The finals were started at 19:41.

Rank	Name	Nation	Time	Behind
Gold medal race
1st place, gold medalist(s)	Franziska Brauße	Germany	3:19.427	
2nd place, silver medalist(s)	Bryony Botha	New Zealand	3:19.869	+0.442
Bronze medal race
3rd place, bronze medalist(s)	Josie Knight	Great Britain	3:21.459	
4	Mieke Kröger	Germany	3:22.002	+0.543
