= 2019 UCI Track Cycling World Championships =

Cycling world championships

- Venue: Pruszków, Poland
- Date: 27 February – 3 March
- Velodrome: BGŻ Arena
- Nations participating: 47
- Events: 20

The 2019 UCI Track Cycling World Championships were held in Pruszków, Poland from 27 February to 3 March 2019.

== Schedule ==
20 events were held:

Date	Time	Round
27 February	13:00	Women's team pursuit qualifying
27 February	13:00	Men's team pursuit qualifying
27 February	18:00	Women's team sprint qualifying
27 February	18:00	Men's team sprint qualifying
27 February	18:00	Women's scratch final
27 February	18:00	Women's team sprint first round
27 February	18:00	Men's team sprint first round
27 February	18:00	Men's team pursuit first round
27 February	18:00	Women's team sprint final
27 February	18:00	Men's team sprint final
28 February	14:30	Women's sprint qualifying, 1/16, 1/8 final
28 February	14:30	Men's keirin 1st round, repechage
28 February	18:30	Women's team pursuit first round
28 February	18:30	Women's sprint 1/4 final
28 February	18:30	Men's keirin 2nd round
28 February	18:30	Men's team pursuit final
28 February	18:30	Men's scratch final
28 February	18:30	Men's keirin final
28 February	18:30	Women's team pursuit final
1 March	15:00	Women's omnium scratch, tempo race
1 March	15:00	Men's time trial qualifying
1 March	15:00	Men's individual pursuit qualifying
1 March	18:30	Men's points race
1 March	18:30	Women's sprint semifinals
1 March	18:30	Women's omnium, Elimination
1 March	18:30	Men's time trial final
1 March	18:30	Men's individual pursuit final
1 March	18:30	Women's sprint final
1 March	18:30	Women's omnium, Points race

Date	Time	Round
2 March	12:00	Women's time trial qualifying
2 March	12:00	Men's sprint qualifying, 1/16, 1/8 final
2 March	12:00	Men's omnium scratch, tempo race
2 March	12:00	Women's individual pursuit qualifying
2 March	17:00	Women's time trial final
2 March	17:00	Men's sprint quarterfinals
2 March	17:00	Women's madison
2 March	17:00	Men's omnium, Elimination
2 March	17:00	Women's individual pursuit final
2 March	17:00	Men's omnium, Points race
3 March	12:00	Men's sprint semifinals
3 March	12:00	Women's keirin, 1st round, repechage
3 March	14:00	Women's points race
3 March	14:00	Men's sprint finals
3 March	14:00	Men's madison
3 March	14:00	Women's keirin, 2nd round
3 March	14:00	Women's keirin finals

== Medal summary ==
=== Medals table ===
* Host nation (Poland)

Rank	Nation	Gold	Silver	Bronze	Total
1	Netherlands	6	4	1	11
2	Australia	6	3	1	10
3	Hong Kong	2	0	0	2
4	Germany	1	2	3	6
5	France	1	2	2	5
6	Great Britain	1	2	1	4
7	Russia	1	1	2	4
8	Italy	1	1	1	3
9	New Zealand	1	0	2	3
10	Denmark	0	1	2	3
11	Ireland	0	1	1	2
12	Japan	0	1	0	1
12	Spain	0	1	0	1
12	Ukraine	0	1	0	1
15	Belgium	0	0	2	2
16	Poland*	0	0	1	1
16	United States	0	0	1	1
Totals (17 entries)		20	20	20	60

=== Men ===
Event	Gold	Silver	Bronze
Keirin	Matthijs Büchli; Netherlands	Yudai Nitta; Japan	Stefan Bötticher; Germany
Madison	Germany; Roger Kluge; Theo Reinhardt	Denmark; Lasse Norman Hansen; Casper von Folsach	Belgium; Kenny De Ketele; Robbe Ghys
Omnium	Campbell Stewart; New Zealand	Benjamin Thomas; France	Ethan Hayter; Great Britain
Individual pursuit	Filippo Ganna; Italy	Domenic Weinstein; Germany	Davide Plebani; Italy
Team pursuit	Australia; Sam Welsford; Kelland O'Brien; Leigh Howard; Alexander Porter; Cameron Scott	Great Britain; Ethan Hayter; Ed Clancy; Kian Emadi; Charlie Tanfield; Oliver Wood	Denmark; Niklas Larsen; Lasse Norman Hansen; Rasmus Pedersen; Casper von Folsach; Julius Johansen
Sprint	Harrie Lavreysen; Netherlands	Jeffrey Hoogland; Netherlands	Mateusz Rudyk; Poland
Team sprint	Netherlands; Roy van den Berg; Harrie Lavreysen; Matthijs Büchli; Jeffrey Hoogland	France; Grégory Baugé; Sébastien Vigier; Michaël D'Almeida; Quentin Lafargue	Russia; Denis Dmitriev; Alexander Sharapov; Pavel Yakushevskiy
Scratch	Sam Welsford; Australia	Roy Eefting; Netherlands	Thomas Sexton; New Zealand
Points race	Jan-Willem van Schip; Netherlands	Sebastián Mora; Spain	Mark Downey; Ireland
1 km time trial	Quentin Lafargue; France	Theo Bos; Netherlands	Michaël d'Almeida; France

=== Women ===
Event	Gold	Silver	Bronze
Keirin	Lee Wai Sze; Hong Kong	Kaarle McCulloch; Australia	Daria Shmeleva; Russia
Madison	Netherlands; Kirsten Wild; Amy Pieters	Australia; Georgia Baker; Amy Cure	Denmark; Amalie Dideriksen; Julie Leth
Omnium	Kirsten Wild; Netherlands	Letizia Paternoster; Italy	Jennifer Valente; United States
Individual pursuit	Ashlee Ankudinoff; Australia	Lisa Brennauer; Germany	Lisa Klein; Germany
Team pursuit	Australia; Annette Edmondson; Ashlee Ankudinoff; Georgia Baker; Amy Cure; Alexandra Manly	Great Britain; Laura Kenny; Katie Archibald; Elinor Barker; Ellie Dickinson	New Zealand; Kirstie James; Holly Edmondston; Bryony Botha; Michaela Drummond; Rushlee Buchanan
Sprint	Lee Wai Sze; Hong Kong	Stephanie Morton; Australia	Mathilde Gros; France
Team sprint	Australia; Kaarle McCulloch; Stephanie Morton	Russia; Daria Shmeleva; Anastasia Voynova	Germany; Miriam Welte; Emma Hinze
Scratch	Elinor Barker; Great Britain	Kirsten Wild; Netherlands	Jolien D'Hoore; Belgium
Points race	Alexandra Manly; Australia	Lydia Boylan; Ireland	Kirsten Wild; Netherlands
500 m time trial	Daria Shmeleva; Russia	Olena Starikova; Ukraine	Kaarle McCulloch; Australia

- Shaded events are non-Olympic
