= Racquel Sheath =

New Zealand cyclist

Personal information
- Born: 27 November 1994 (age 31) Morrinsville, New Zealand

Cycling career
- Sport: Cycling
- Disciplines: Track; Road
- Role: Rider
Medal record
Women's track cycling
Representing New Zealand
World Championships
Bronze medal – third place	2017 Hong Kong	Team pursuit
Commonwealth Games
Silver medal – second place	2018 Gold Coast	Team pursuit

Racquel Sheath (born 27 November 1994) is a retired New Zealand track and road cyclist. She represented her nation at the 2015 UCI Track Cycling World Championships.

Sheath competed for the New Zealand team in the women's team pursuit at the 2016 Summer Olympics in Rio de Janeiro. There, she delivered the quartet of Lauren Ellis, Jaime Nielsen, and Rushlee Buchanan a New Zealand record of 4:17.592 to ensure the team's spot in the medal race, before narrowly losing the face-off to their Canadian rivals (4:18.459) for the bronze by a 3.8-second margin.

Sheath retired from cycling in August 2020. Following her retirement, she became a financial adviser with her family's insurance company, and opened a nail salon in Cambridge.

== Major results ==
2014
Oceania Track Championships

1st Team pursuit (with Lauren Ellis, Jaime Nielsen and Georgia Williams)
2nd Omnium

BikeNZ Classic

3rd Points race
3rd Scratch

2015
6th Overall Tour of America's Dairyland
2016
1st Criterium, National Road Championships
Oceania Track Championships

2nd Madison (with Michaela Drummond)
2nd Omnium
2nd Team sprint (with Emma Cumming)
3rd Points race

2017
Oceania Track Championships

1st Omnium
1st Team pursuit

2nd Omnium, National Track Championships
2nd Criterium, National Road Championships
3rd Team pursuit, UCI Track Cycling World Championships
6th White Spot / Delta Road Race
2018
1st Criterium, National Road Championships
2nd Team pursuit, Commonwealth Games
