= Michaela Drummond =

New Zealand cyclist (born 1998)

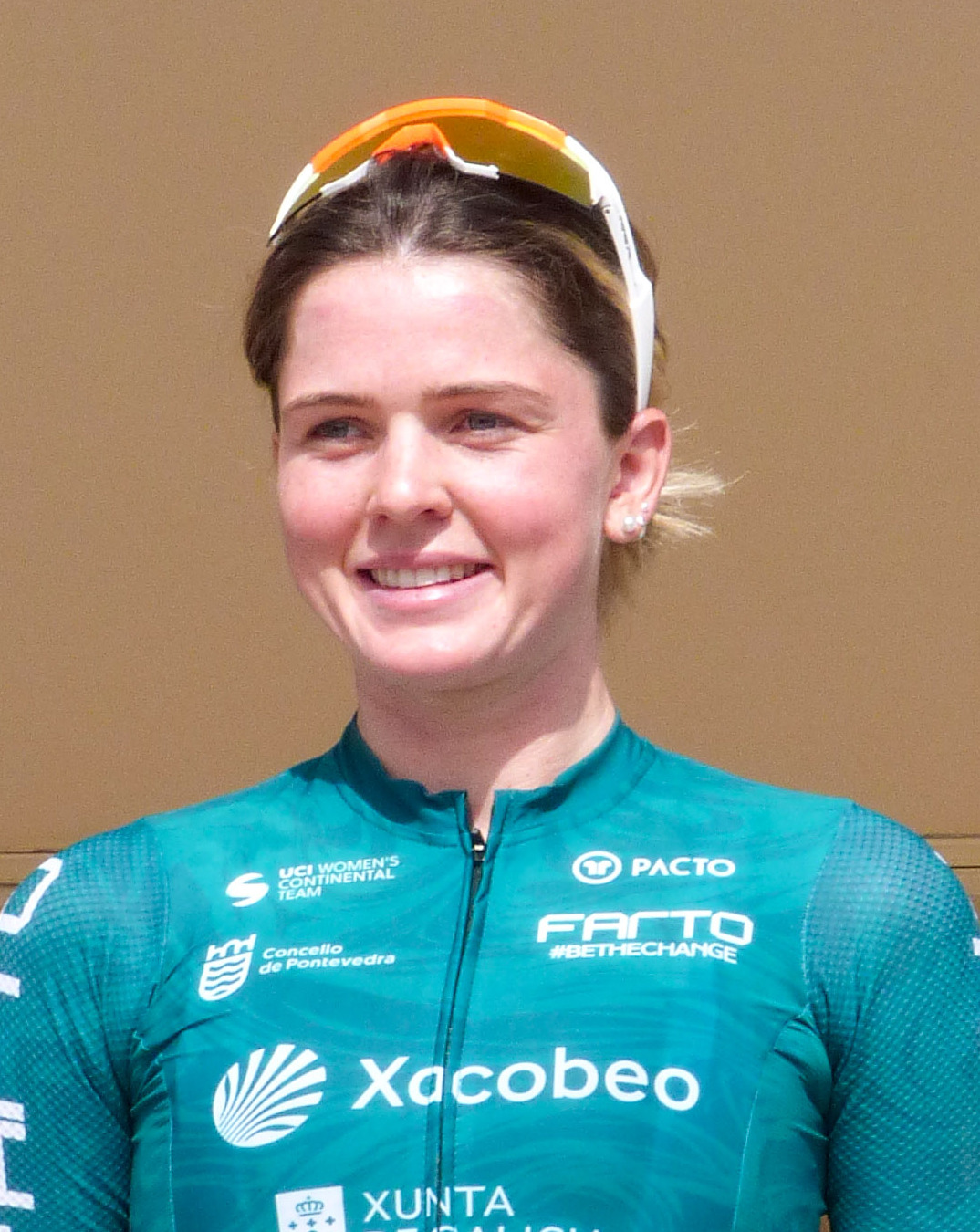
- Drummond in 2023

Personal information
- Born: 5 April 1998 (age 28) Te Awamutu, New Zealand
- Height: 1.62 m (5 ft 4 in)
- Weight: 61 kg (134 lb)

Cycling career
- Sport: Cycling
- Disciplines: Track; Road
- Role: Rider
- Rider type: Endurance (track); Sprinter (road)

Amateur teams
- 2015–2016: Black Magic Women Cycling Team
- 2018–2019: DNA Pro Cycling

Professional teams
- 2017: Visit Dallas DNA Pro Cycling
- 2020: DNA Pro Cycling
- 2021–2022: Bepink
- 2023: Zaaf Cycling Team
- 2023: Team Farto–BTC
- 2024–2025: Arkéa–B&B Hotels Women
Medal record
Women's track cycling
Representing New Zealand
World Championships
Silver medal – second place	2023 Glasgow	Team pursuit
Bronze medal – third place	2017 Hong Kong	Team pursuit
Bronze medal – third place	2019 Pruszków	Team pursuit
Bronze medal – third place	2023 Glasgow	Scratch
Commonwealth Games
Silver medal – second place	2022 Birmingham	Team pursuit
Silver medal – second place	2022 Birmingham	Scratch race
Junior World Championships
Gold medal – first place	2015 Astana	Team pursuit
Silver medal – second place	2016 Aigle	Team pursuit
Silver medal – second place	2016 Aigle	Omnium
Oceania Championships
Gold medal – first place	2017 Melbourne	Scratch Race
Gold medal – first place	2018 Cambridge	Team pursuit
Silver medal – second place	2017 Melbourne	Madison
Silver medal – second place	2017 Melbourne	Team pursuit
Silver medal – second place	2020 Invercargill	Omnium
Silver medal – second place	2020 Invercargill	Madison
Bronze medal – third place	2018 Cambridge	Omnium
Bronze medal – third place	2019 Adelaide	Madison
Under 19 Oceania Championships
Gold medal – first place	2015 Adelaide	Omnium
Gold medal – first place	2015 Adelaide	Scratch race

Michaela Drummond (born 5 April 1998) is a New Zealand professional track and road racing cyclist, who last rode for UCI Women's ProTeam Arkéa–B&B Hotels Women. She won bronze medals in the team pursuit at the 2017 UCI Track Cycling World Championships and 2019 UCI Track Cycling World Championships. At the 2023 UCI Track Cycling World Championships she won a silver medal in the team pursuit and a bronze medal in the scratch race.

== Major results ==
=== Track ===
2015
UCI Junior Track World Championships

1st Team Pursuit

Oceania Track Championships

1st Omnium
1st Scratch Race

New Zealand Track Championships

1st Omnium
1st Points Race

2016
Oceania Track Championships

1st Scratch Race
2nd Madison (with Racquel Sheath)

UCI Junior Track World Championships

2nd Omnium
2nd Team Pursuit

New Zealand Track Championships

1st Omnium

2017
Oceania Track Championships

1st Team Pursuit
3rd Omnium

New Zealand Track Championships

1st Omnium
1st Madison (with Racquel Sheath)

3rd Team pursuit, UCI Track World Championships

=== Road ===
2015
2nd Road race, National Junior Road Championships
2019
3rd Road race, National Road Championships
2023
1st Stage 2 Tour Cycliste Féminin International de l'Ardèche
2nd Schwalbe Classic
2024
1st Criterium, National Road Championships
1st Région Pays de la Loire Tour
Volta a Portugal

1st Points classification
1st Stages 1 & 3

5th Gravel and Tar Classic
7th Kreiz Breizh Elites Dames
2025
4th Vuelta CV Feminas
5th Trofeo Marratxi-Felanitx
