= Ashlee Ankudinoff =

Australian cyclist (born 1990)

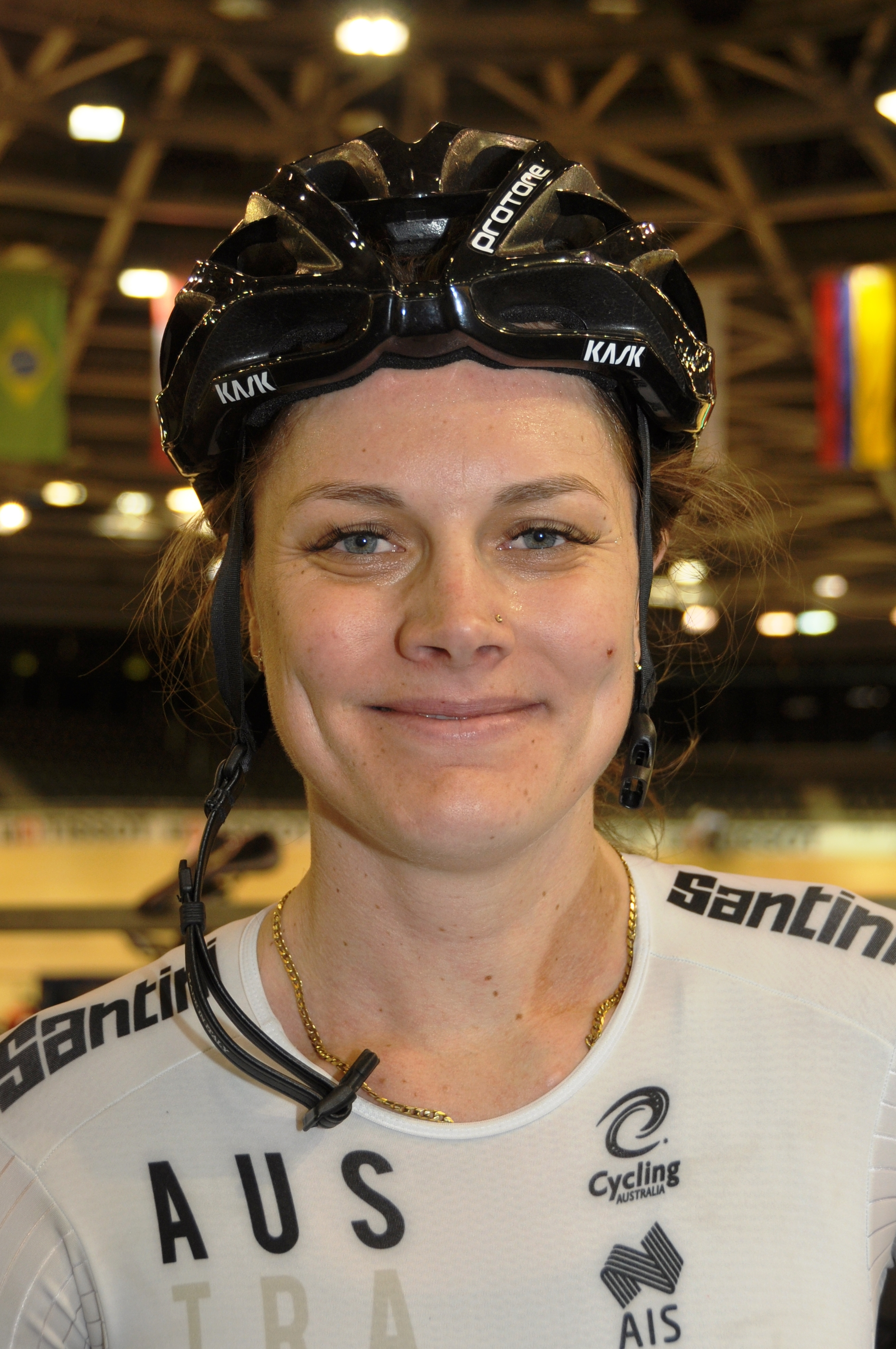

Personal information
- Born: 20 August 1990 (age 36) Sydney, Australia
- Height: 173 cm (5 ft 8 in)
- Weight: 67 kg (148 lb)

Cycling career
- Sport: Cycling
- Current team: Specialized Women's Racing
- Disciplines: Road & Track
- Role: Rider

Amateur team
- 2018 –: Specialized Women's Racing
Medal record
Women's track cycling
Representing Australia
World Championships
Gold medal – first place	2010 Ballerup	Team pursuit
Gold medal – first place	2015 Yvelines	Team pursuit
Gold medal – first place	2019 Pruszków	Individual pursuit
Gold medal – first place	2019 Pruszków	Team pursuit
Silver medal – second place	2017 Hong Kong	Individual pursuit
Silver medal – second place	2017 Hong Kong	Team pursuit
Bronze medal – third place	2009 Pruszków	Team pursuit
Bronze medal – third place	2012 Melbourne	Individual pursuit
Commonwealth Games
Gold medal – first place	2018 Gold Coast	Team pursuit

Ashlee Ankudinoff (born 20 August 1990) is an Australian professional racing cyclist.

== Biography ==
Ankudinoff was born in Sydney, New South Wales, and attended Kirrawee High School. She began competitive cycling at the age of fifteen on the road.

Ankudinoff was a member of the gold medal-winning team pursuit squad, and also took the victory in the individual pursuit at the UCI Junior Track World Championships in 2008.

Ankudinoff qualified for the Tokyo 2020 Olympics. She was a member of the Women's pursuit team. The team consisting of Ashlee Ankudinoff, Georgia Baker, Annette Edmondson, Alexandra Manly, Maeve Plouffe finished fifth.

== Major results ==
2008
UCI Track World Championships (Junior)

1st Pursuit
1st Team Pursuit, with Megan Dunn & Sarah Kent

2nd Team Pursuit, UCI Track Cycling World Cup Classics
2nd Pursuit, Australian National Track Championships (Junior)
2nd Team Pursuit, Australian National Track Championships (Elite)

2009
Oceania Track Championships

1st Points Race
1st Team Pursuit

2nd Individual pursuit, Australian National Track Championships
3rd Team pursuit, Round 2, Track World Cup, Melbourne
3rd Team Pursuit, UCI Track World Championships

2010
1st Team Pursuit, UCI Track World Championships
1st Omnium Australian National Track Championships

2011
Oceania Track Championships

1st Omnium
1st Scratch Race

2012
Oceania Track Championships

1st Scratch Race
1st Points Race
1st Individual Pursuit
1st Team Pursuit

2nd Team Pursuit, Track Cycling World Cup Glasgow

2014
Oceania Track Championships

1st Scratch Race
2nd Team Pursuit (with Georgia Baker, Lauren Perry and Rebecca Wiasak and Elissa Wundersitz)

1st Omnium Australian National Track Championships
BikeNZ Classic

1st Omnium
1st Scratch Race

BikeNZ Cup

1st Points Race
1st Scratch Race

2016
Oceania Track Championships

1st Individual Pursuit
1st Team pursuit (with Amy Cure, Annette Edmondson and Alexandra Manly)
3rd Madison (with Josie Talbot)

2017
1st Six Day Melbourne (with Amy Cure)
2nd Individual Pursuit, UCI World Track Championships

2018
1st Team Pursuit, Commonwealth Games (with Amy Cure, Annette Edmondson and Alexandra Manly)
National Track Championships

1st Omnium
1st Individual Pursuit
3rd Points Race
3rd Madison
3rd Team Pursuit
