= Holly Edmondston =

New Zealand cyclist

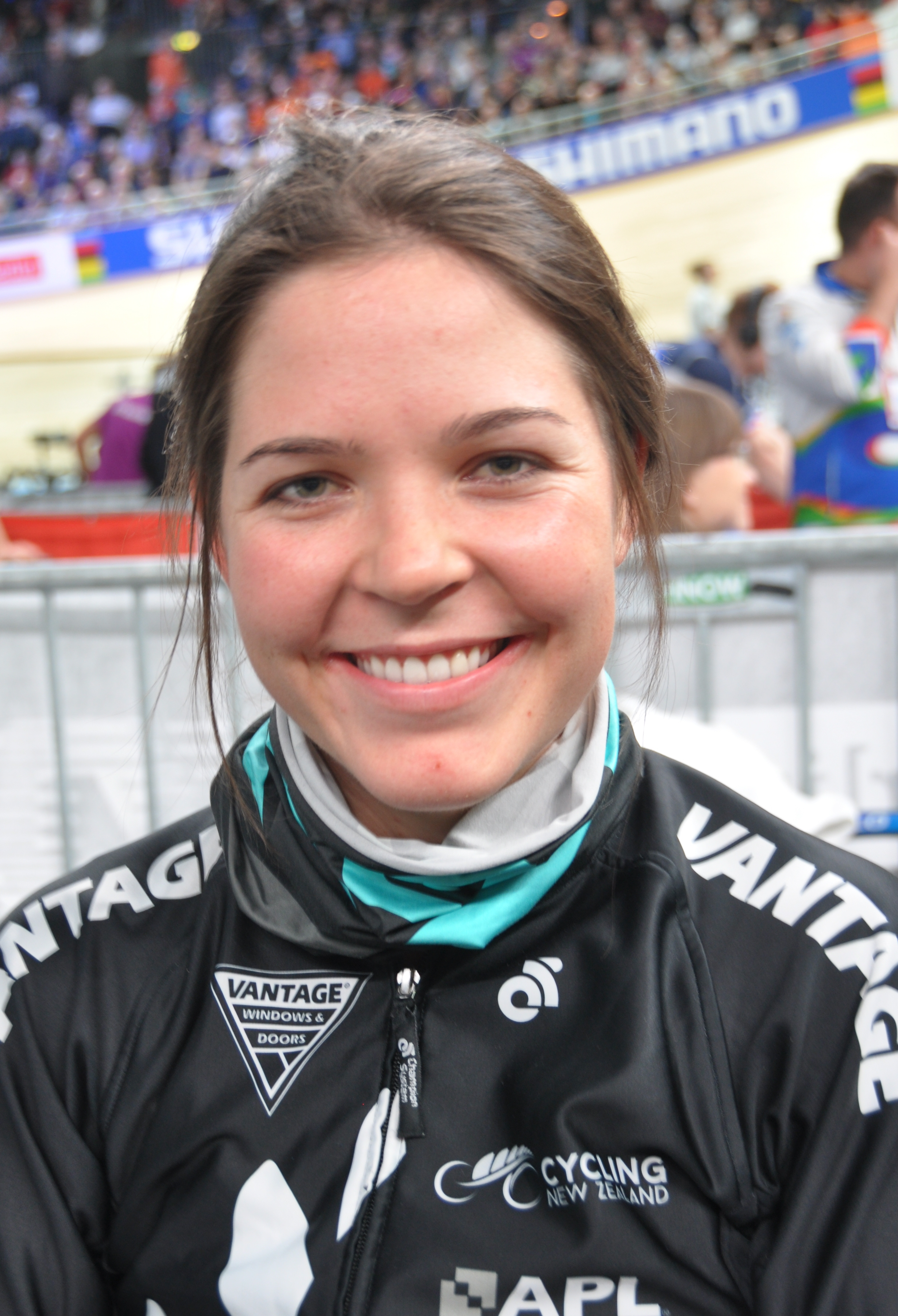

Personal information
- Born: 5 December 1996 (age 29)

Cycling career
- Sport: Cycling
- Discipline: Track cycling
- Role: Rider
Medal record
World Championships
Bronze medal – third place	2019 Pruszków	Team pursuit
UCI Junior Track World Championships
Bronze medal – third place	2014 Gwangmyeong	Team pursuit

Holly Edmondston (born 5 December 1996) is a New Zealand racing cyclist. She competed at the 2020 Summer Olympics, in women's team pursuit, and women's omnium.

In February 2019, she won the bronze medal in the women's team pursuit event at the 2019 UCI Track Cycling World Championships.

== Major results ==
2017
3rd White Spot / Delta Road Race
2019
National Road Championships

3rd time trial
5th road race

2022
National Road Championships

3rd time trial
