= Rushlee Buchanan =

New Zealand cyclist (born 1988)

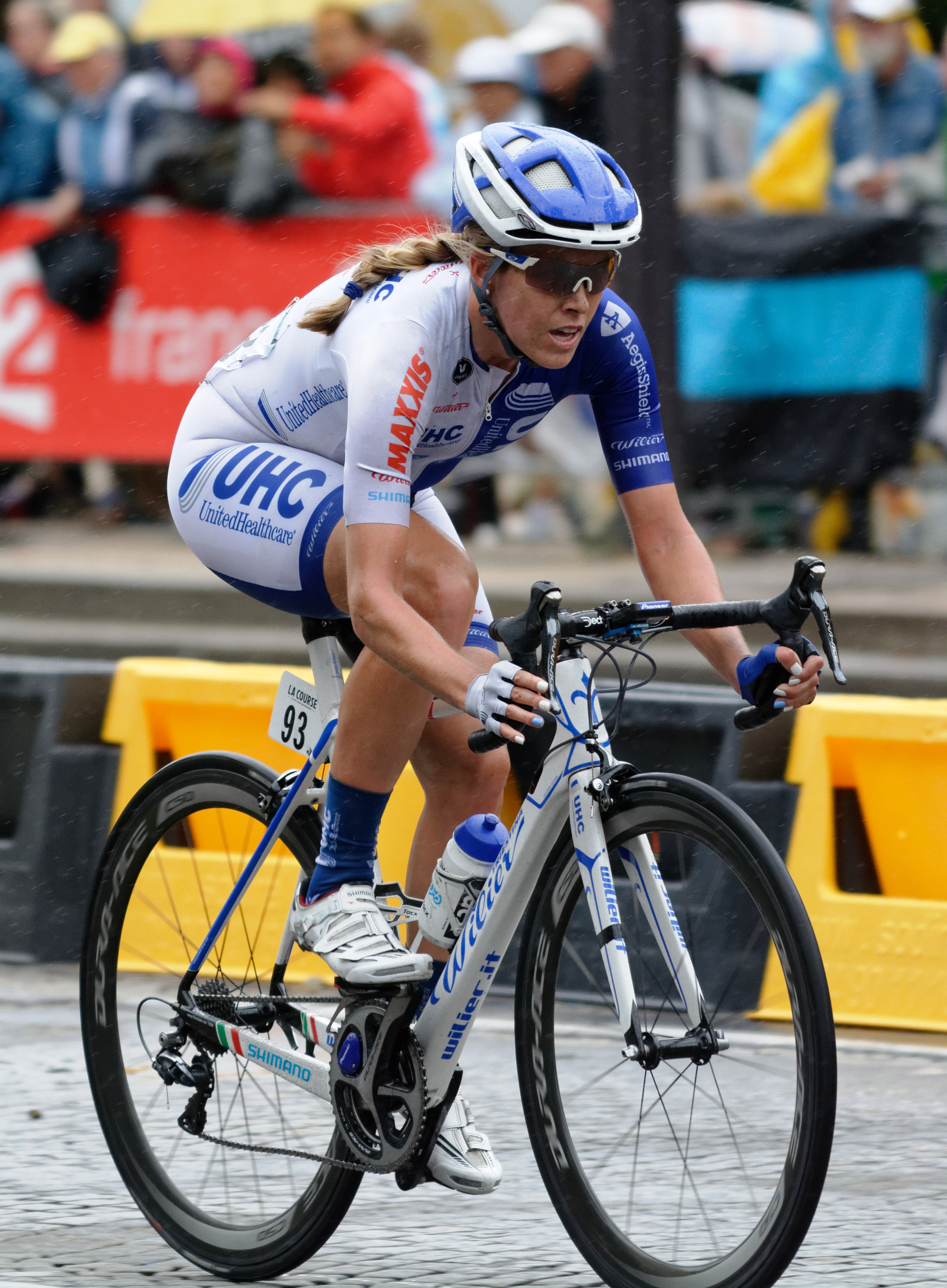
- Buchanan at the 2015 La Course by Le Tour de France

Personal information
- Born: 20 January 1988 (age 38) Hamilton, New Zealand
- Height: 1.70 m (5 ft 7 in)
- Weight: 63 kg (139 lb)

Cycling career
- Sport: Cycling
- Disciplines: Track; Road
- Role: Rider

Amateur team
- 2010: Colavita/Baci

Professional teams
- 2008–2009: Team Tibco
- 2011: Colavita–Forno d'Asolo
- 2013: Team TIBCO–To The Top
- 2014–2018: UnitedHealthcare
Medal record
Women's track cycling
Representing New Zealand
World Championships
Bronze medal – third place	2010 Ballerup	Team pursuit
Bronze medal – third place	2017 Hong Kong	Team pursuit
Bronze medal – third place	2018 Apeldoorn	Omnium
Bronze medal – third place	2019 Pruszków	Team pursuit
Commonwealth Games
Silver medal – second place	2018 Gold Coast	Team pursuit

Rushlee Buchanan (born 20 January 1988) is a New Zealand track and road cyclist. She competed at the 2020 Summer Olympics, in Women's madison, and Women's team pursuit.

== Career ==
She won bronze at the 2010 UCI Track Cycling World Championships in the Team Pursuit.

She competed in the scratch, points and road races at both the 2010 and 2014 Commonwealth Games. At the 2018 Commonwealth Games she won a silver medal in the team pursuit.

She has won the women's New Zealand road race championships a record four times, in 2010, 2014, 2016 and 2017. She won the New Zealand time trial championships in 2016.

== Personal life ==
Buchanan is married to American cyclist Adrian Hegyvary.

== Major results ==
=== Track ===
2005
2nd Points race, UCI Juniors World Championships
2006
2nd Individual pursuit, National Junior Track Championships
2010
1st Team pursuit, 2010–11 UCI Track Cycling World Cup Classics, Cali
National Track Championships

1st Scratch
1st Team pursuit
3rd Omnium

3rd Team pursuit, UCI Track Cycling World Championships
2011
1st Team pursuit, 2010–11 UCI Track Cycling World Cup Classics, Beijing
2013
Oceania Track Championships

1st Scratch
1st Team pursuit

Madison Cup

1st Points race
3rd Keirin

Challenge International sur piste

1st Scratch
3rd Individual pursuit

Invercargill

1st Points race
3rd Scratch

National Track Championships

3rd Individual pursuit
3rd Points race

2016
2nd Points race, Festival of Speed
2017
Oceania Track Championships

1st Team pursuit
2nd Omnium

National Track Championships

1st Points race
1st Team pursuit
2nd Individual pursuit
2nd Scratch
3rd Omnium

3rd Team pursuit, UCI Track Cycling World Championships
2018
1st Team pursuit, Oceania Track Championships
2nd Team pursuit, Commonwealth Games
3rd Omnium, UCI Track Cycling World Championships
2019
3rd Team pursuit, UCI Track Cycling World Championships

=== Road ===
2006
1st Road race, National Junior Road Championships
2007
1st Mount Maunganui
3rd Overall Tour de Delta

1st Stage 2

2009
1st Criterium, National Road Championships
2010
1st Road race, National Road Championships
2011
National Road Championships

2nd Criterium
3rd Road race

2014
1st Road race, National Road Championships
2015
9th Overall Joe Martin Stage Race
2016
National Road Championships

1st Road race
1st Time trial

2017
National Road Championships

1st Road race
1st Criterium
3rd Time trial

2018
2nd Time trial, National Road Championships
5th Time trial, Commonwealth Games
5th Chrono Gatineau
8th Overall BeNe Ladies Tour
10th Overall Tour de Feminin-O cenu Českého Švýcarska
10th Grand Prix Cycliste de Gatineau
2019
2nd Time trial, National Road Championships
