= Bryony Botha =

New Zealand cyclist (born 1997)

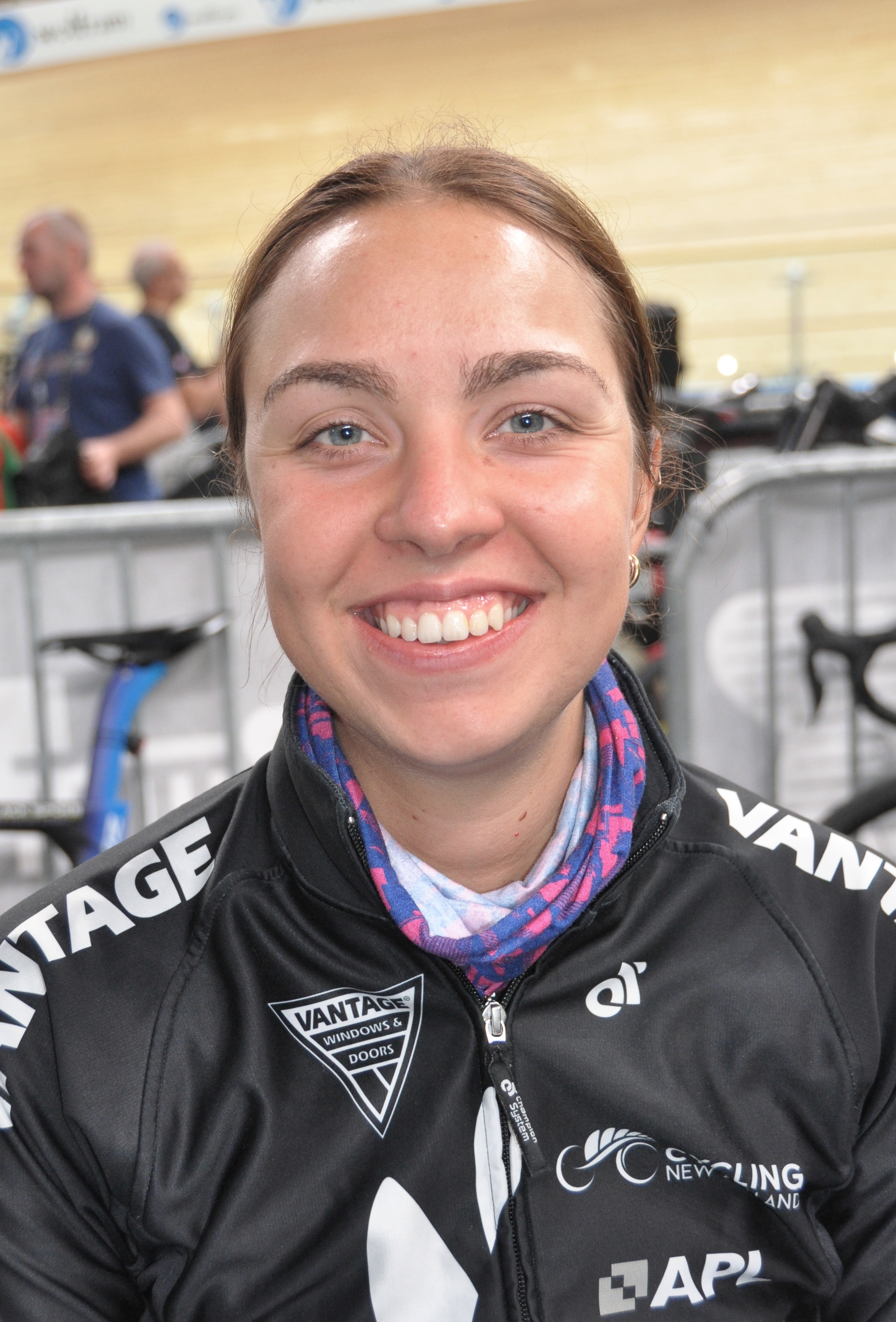
- Botha in 2020

Personal information
- Born: 4 November 1997 (age 29) Takapuna, New Zealand
- Height: 1.74 m (5 ft 9 in)
- Weight: 69 kg (152 lb)

Cycling career
- Sport: Cycling
- Disciplines: Track; Road
- Role: Rider
- Rider type: Endurance
Medal record
Women's track cycling
Representing New Zealand
Olympic Games
Silver medal – second place	2024 Paris	Team pursuit
World Championships
Silver medal – second place	2022 Saint-Quentin-en-Yvelines	Individual pursuit
Silver medal – second place	2023 Glasgow	Team pursuit
Bronze medal – third place	2019 Pruszków	Team pursuit
Bronze medal – third place	2023 Glasgow	Individual pursuit
Bronze medal – third place	2024 Ballerup	Individual pursuit
Bronze medal – third place	2025 Santiago	Points race
Commonwealth Games
Gold medal – first place	2022 Birmingham	Individual pursuit
Silver medal – second place	2018 Gold Coast	Team pursuit
Silver medal – second place	2022 Birmingham	Team pursuit
Silver medal – second place	2026 Glasgow	Team pursuit
UCI Junior Track World Championships
Gold medal – first place	2015 Astana	Team pursuit
Bronze medal – third place	2014 Gwangmyeong	Team pursuit

Bryony Botha (born 4 November 1997) is a New Zealand road and track cyclist. On the 7th of August 2024 she won a silver medal in the team pursuit during the 2024 summer Olympic Games with Ally Wollaston, Emily Shearman and Nicole Shields.

== Career ==
Botha was raised in Auckland, New Zealand and attended Rangitoto College.

At the 2015 Juniors Track World Championships Botha was part of the team pursuit that won the event, and broke the world team pursuit record. In 2017 Botha represented New Zealand at the Oceania Track Cycling Championships where she won the team pursuit and scratch race. Later in the year Botha also competed at the Chile Track Cycling World Cup, winning gold in the women's team pursuit.

She represented New Zealand at the 2018 Commonwealth Games claiming silver in the team pursuit. Botha also won bronze in the team pursuit at the 2019 Track Cycling World Championships in Poland.

In February 2025 at the UCI Oceania Track Cycling Championships, Botha set a new world record twice in the women’s 4000 metre individual pursuit, with a time of 4:31:446 while qualifying and a time of 4:30.72 in the final. However, her record was surpassed twice later that week, as on February 15, 2025, Anna Morris won the women’s 4000 metre individual pursuit at the European Track Championships, and set a new world record in that event twice that day, by setting a world record time of 4:28.306 while qualifying and then a new world record time of 4:25.874 in the final.

== Career achievements ==
=== Major results ===
2014
National Junior Track Championships

1st Individual pursuit
1st Omnium
3rd 500m time trial

3rd Team pursuit, UCI Juniors Track World Championships
2015
1st Team pursuit, UCI Juniors Track World Championships
2nd Omnium, National Junior Track Championships
3rd Time trial, National Junior Road Championships
2016
1st Team pursuit, National Track Championships
2017
National Track Championships

1st Team pursuit
3rd Madison

2018
2nd Team pursuit, Commonwealth Games
2019
1st Team pursuit, National Track Championships
3rd Team pursuit, UCI Track World Championships
2022
Commonwealth Games

1st Individual pursuit
2nd Team pursuit

2nd Individual pursuit, UCI Track World Championships
2025
3rd Points race, UCI Track World Championships

=== Awards ===
In 2015 Botha won Auckland's Youth Sportswoman of the Year award and North Harbour Junior Sports Woman of the Year award.
