= Annie Foreman-Mackey =

Canadian cyclist (born 1991)

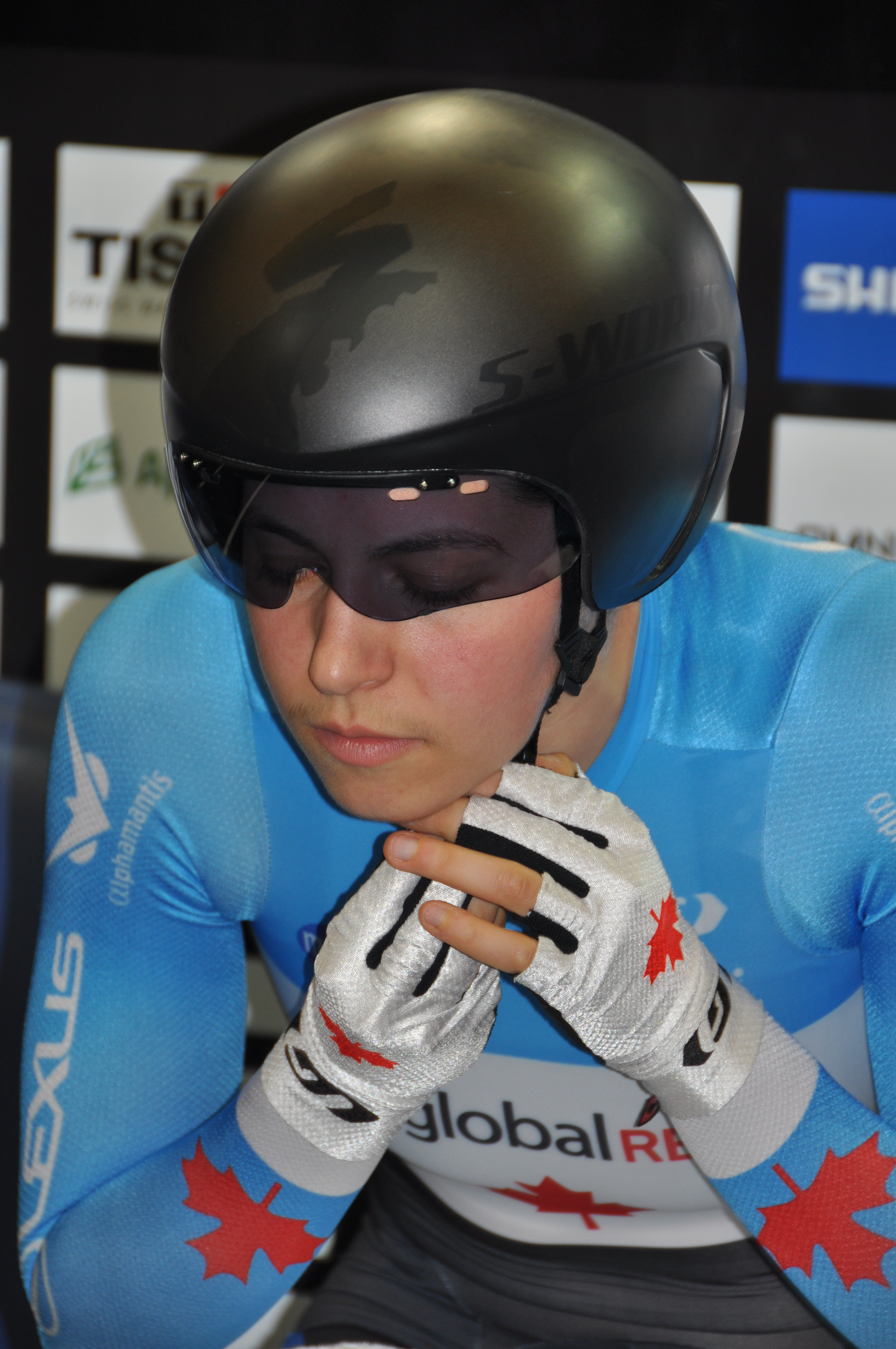
- Foreman-Mackey in 2018

Personal information
- Born: 25 June 1991 (age 35) Kingston, Ontario, Canada
- Height: 171 cm (5 ft 7 in)
- Weight: 65 kg (143 lb)

Cycling career
- Sport: Cycling
- Role: Rider
Medal record
Representing Canada
Women's track cycling
World Championships
Bronze medal – third place	2016 London	Individual pursuit
Pan American Championships
Gold medal – first place	2019 Cochabamba	Team pursuit
Silver medal – second place	2015 Santiago	Team pursuit
Silver medal – second place	2019 Cochabamba	Individual pursuit
Bronze medal – third place	2015 Santiago	Individual pursuit
Commonwealth Games
Bronze medal – third place	2018 Gold Coast	Team pursuit

Annie Foreman-Mackey (born 25 June 1991) is a Canadian professional racing cyclist. She won the bronze medal in the women's individual pursuit event at the 2016 UCI Track Cycling World Championships. She qualified to represent Canada at the 2020 Summer Olympics. In 2022, she officially retired from cycling.

== Personal life ==
Annie currently holds a Honours Bachelor of Health Sciences from McMaster University (2009–14) and a Masters of Public Health from the University of Toronto (2014–18) with a focus on harm reduction research and advocacy. She is currently attending medical school at the University of British Columbia.

== Major results ==
2015
Pan-American Track Championships

2nd Team Pursuit (with Allison Beveridge, Kirsti Lay and Stephanie Roorda)
3rd Individual Pursuit

2017
2nd Team Pursuit, Round 1, (Pruszków) Track Cycling World Cup (with Ariane Bonhomme, Allison Beveridge and Kinley Gibson)
