= Cycling at the 2018 Commonwealth Games – Women's scratch race =

Cycling Track – Women's scratch race at the 2018 Commonwealth Games
- Venue: Anna Meares Velodrome
- Dates: 8 April
- Competitors: 24 from 11 nations

Medalists
gold medal	Amy Cure	Australia
silver medal	Neah Evans	Scotland
bronze medal	Emily Kay	England

The Women's scratch race at the 2018 Commonwealth Games, as part of the cycling programme, took place on 8 April 2018.

== Results ==
Rank	Rider	Laps down
1st place, gold medalist(s)	Amy Cure (AUS)	
2nd place, silver medalist(s)	Neah Evans (SCO)	
3rd place, bronze medalist(s)	Emily Kay (ENG)	
4	Katie Archibald (SCO)	
5	Kirstie James (NZL)	
6	Ellie Dickinson (ENG)	
7	Allison Beveridge (CAN)	
8	Lydia Boylan (NIR)	
9	Manon Lloyd (WAL)	
10	Michaela Drummond (NZL)	
11	Megan Barker (WAL)	
12	Elinor Barker (WAL)	
13	Ju Pha Som Net (MAS)	
14	Annette Edmondson (AUS)	
15	Racquel Sheath (NZL)	
16	Amber Joseph (BAR)	
17	Ashlee Ankudinoff (AUS)	
18	Ariane Bonhomme (CAN)	
19	Luo Yiwei (SGP)	
20	Stephanie Roorda (CAN)	
21	Emily Nelson (ENG)	
22	Eileen Roe (SCO)	
	Sonali Mayanglambam (IND)	DNF
	Monorama Tongbram (IND)	DNF
