= 2013 UCI Juniors Track World Championships =

- Venue: (Scotland) Sir Chris Hoy Velodrome In Glasgow
- Date: 7–11 August 2013

The 2013 UCI Juniors Track World Championships were the 39th annual Junior World Championships for track cycling, held at the Sir Chris Hoy Velodrome in Glasgow, Scotland from 7 to 11 August.

The Championships had ten events for men (sprint, points race, individual pursuit, team pursuit, 1 kilometre time trial, team sprint, keirin, madison, scratch race, omnium) and nine for women (sprint, individual pursuit, 500 metre time trial, points race, keirin, scratch race, team sprint, team pursuit, omnium).

== Medal summary ==
Event	Gold	Silver	Bronze
Men's Events
Sprint	Svajūnas Jonauskas; Lithuania	Jeremy Presbury; New Zealand	Vladislav Fedin; Russia
Points race	Benjamin Thomas; France	Liam Aitcheson; New Zealand	Ivo Oliveira; Portugal
Individual pursuit	Zachary Shaw; Australia	Callum Scotson; Australia	Pavel Chursin; Russia
Team pursuit	Jack Edwards; Joshua Harrison; Callum Scotson; Sam Welsford; Australia	Liam Aitcheson; Regan Gough; Joshua Haggerty; Connor Stead; New Zealand	Timur Gizzatullin; Sergey Mosin; Andrey Prostokshin; Dmitry Strakhov; Russia
Time trial	Maximilian Dörnbach; Germany	Alexander Dubchenko; Russia	Zachary Shaw; Australia
Team sprint	Jai Angsuthasawit; Patrick Constable; Alexander Radzikiewicz; Australia	Alexander Dubchenko; Vladislav Fedin; Sergey Gorlov; Russia	Maximilian Dörnbach; Jan May; Patryk Rahn; Germany
Keirin	Sergey Gorlov; Russia	Jaroslav Snasel; Czech Republic	Alexander Dubchenko; Russia
Madison	Mathias Krigbaum; Jonas Poulsen; Denmark	Regan Gough; Liam Aitcheson; New Zealand	Joshua Harrison; Sam Welsford; Australia
Scratch race	Manuel Porzner; Germany	Joshua Haggerty; New Zealand	Cristian Cornejo; Chile
Omnium	Jack Edwards; Australia	Marc Jurczyk; Germany}	Casper Pedersen; Denmark

Event	Gold	Silver	Bronze
Women's Events
Sprint	Dannielle Khan; Great Britain	Nicky Degrendele; Belgium	Melissandre Pain; France
Individual pursuit	Lauren Perry; Australia	Natalia Mozharova; Russia	Josie Talbot; Australia
Time trial	Dannielle Khan; Great Britain	Melissandre Pain; France	Tian Beckett; Australia
Points race	Arianna Fidanza; Italy	Elissa Wundersitz; Australia	Hayley Jones; Great Britain
Keirin	Melissandre Pain; France	Dannielle Khan; Great Britain	Soojin Kim; South Korea
Scratch race	Jessica Parra; Colombia	Kinley Gibson; Canada	Amalie Dideriksen; Denmark
Team sprint	Tian Beckett; Tennille Falappi; Australia	Tatiana Kiseleva; Ekaterina Rogovaya; Russia	Yeonhee Yang; Soojin Kim; South Korea
Team pursuit	Amy Hill; Hayley Jones; Emily Kay; Emily Nelson; Great Britain	Anastasia Buchneva; Maria Kantsyber; Natalia Mozharova; Svetlana Vasilieva; Russia	Lauren Perry; Kelsey Robson; Macey Stewart; Elissa Wundersitz; Australia
Omnium	Anna Knauer; Germany	Soline Lamboley; France	Emily Kay; Great Britain

== Medal table ==
* Host nation (Great Britain)

Rank	Nation	Gold	Silver	Bronze	Total
1	Australia (AUS)	6	2	5	13
2	Great Britain (GBR)*	3	1	2	6
3	Germany (GER)	3	1	1	5
4	France (FRA)	2	2	1	5
5	Russia (RUS)	1	5	4	10
6	Denmark (DEN)	1	0	2	3
7	Colombia (COL)	1	0	0	1
7	Italy (ITA)	1	0	0	1
7	Lithuania (LTU)	1	0	0	1
10	New Zealand (NZL)	0	5	0	5
11	Belgium (BEL)	0	1	0	1
11	Canada (CAN)	0	1	0	1
11	Czech Republic (CZE)	0	1	0	1
14	South Korea (KOR)	0	0	2	2
15	Chile (CHI)	0	0	1	1
15	Portugal (POR)	0	0	1	1
Totals (16 entries)		19	19	19	57
