= 2019 UEC European Track Championships – Women's elimination race =

Women's elimination race at the 2019 UEC European Track Championships
- Venue: Omnisport Apeldoorn, Apeldoorn
- Date: 17 October
- Competitors: 18 from 18 nations

Medalists
gold medal	Kirsten Wild	Netherlands
silver medal	Emily Nelson	Great Britain
bronze medal	Nikol Płosaj	Poland

The women's elimination race competition at the 2019 UEC European Track Championships was held on 17 October 2019.

== Results ==
Rank	Name	Nation
1st place, gold medalist(s)	Kirsten Wild	Netherlands
2nd place, silver medalist(s)	Emily Nelson	Great Britain
3rd place, bronze medalist(s)	Nikol Płosaj	Poland
4	Maria Giulia Confalonieri	Italy
5	Victoire Berteau	France
6	Kseniia Fedotova	Ukraine
7	Maria Martins	Portugal
8	Irene Usabiaga	Spain
9	Polina Pivovarova	Belarus
10	Shannon McCurley	Ireland
11	Evgenia Mudraya	Russia
12	Johanna Kitti Borissza	Hungary
13	Trine Schmidt	Denmark
14	Tereza Medveďová	Slovakia
15	Viktorija Šumskytė	Lithuania
16	Lucie Hochmann	Czech Republic
17	Andrea Waldis	Switzerland
18	Gilke Croket	Belgium
