= 2019 UEC European Track Championships – Women's scratch =

Cycling race

Women's scratch at the 2019 UEC European Track Championships
- Venue: Omnisport Apeldoorn, Apeldoorn
- Date: 16 October
- Competitors: 21 from 21 nations

Medalists
gold medal	Emily Nelson	Great Britain
silver medal	Shannon McCurley	Ireland
bronze medal	Maria Martins	Portugal

The women's scratch competition at the 2019 UEC European Track Championships was held on 16 October 2019. Emily Nelson of Great Britain won the gold medal.

== Results ==
First rider across the line without a net lap loss wins.

Rank	Name	Nation	Laps down
1st place, gold medalist(s)	Emily Nelson	Great Britain	
2nd place, silver medalist(s)	Shannon McCurley	Ireland	
3rd place, bronze medalist(s)	Maria Martins	Portugal	
4	Ana Usabiaga	Spain	
5	Łucja Pietrzak	Poland	
6	Olivija Baleišytė	Lithuania	
7	Kirsten Wild	Netherlands	
8	Alžbeta Bačíková	Slovakia	
9	Aline Seitz	Switzerland	
10	Martina Fidanza	Italy	
11	Verena Eberhardt	Austria	
12	Trine Schmidt	Denmark	
13	Viktoriya Bondar	Ukraine	
14	Victoire Berteau	France	
15	Evgenia Mudraya	Russia	
16	Gilke Croket	Belgium	
17	Anita Stenberg	Norway	
18	Jarmila Machačová	Czech Republic	
19	Johanna Kitti Borissza	Hungary	
20	Hanna Tserakh	Belarus	
21	Charlotte Becker	Germany	
