= 2017 UEC European Track Championships – Women's team pursuit =

Women's team pursuit at the 2017 UEC European Track Championships
- UEC European Champion jersey
- Venue: Velodrom, Berlin
- Date: 18-19 October
- Competitors: 33 from 8 nations
- Winning time: 4:17.853

Medalists
gold medal	Elisa Balsamo; Tatiana Guderzo; Letizia Paternoster; Silvia Valsecchi	Italy
silver medal	Katie Archibald; Elinor Barker; Manon Lloyd; Emily Kay; Ellie Dickinson	Great Britain
bronze medal	Justyna Kaczkowska; Katarzyna Pawłowska; Daria Pikulik; Nikol Płosaj	Poland

The Women's team pursuit was held on 18 and 19 October 2017.

== Results ==
=== Qualifying ===
All 8 teams qualify for the first round, from which the top 4 remain in contention for the gold medal final and the other 4 for the bronze medal final.

Rank	Name	Nation	Time	Notes
1	Elisa Balsamo; Tatiana Guderzo; Letizia Paternoster; Silvia Valsecchi	Italy	4:20.636	Q
2	Katie Archibald; Elinor Barker; Ellie Dickinson; Emily Kay	Great Britain	4:21.219	Q
3	Charlotte Becker; Lisa Brennauer; Lisa Klein; Gudrun Stock	Germany	4:25.355	Q
4	Justyna Kaczkowska; Katarzyna Pawłowska; Daria Pikulik; Nikol Płosaj	Poland	4:26.462	Q
5	Laurie Berthon; Marion Borras; Élise Delzenne; Coralie Demay	France	4:27.473	q
6	Gulnaz Badykova; Alexandra Chekina; Aleksandra Goncharova; Anastasiia Iakovenko	Russia	4:34.561	q
7	Gilke Croket; Annelies Dom; Lotte Kopecky; Saartje Vandenbroucke	Belgium	4:36.183	q
8	Katsiaryna Piatrouskaya; Palina Pivavarava; Tatsiana Sharakova; Hanna Tserakh	Belarus	4:37.789	q

- Q = qualified; in contention for gold medal final
- q = qualified; in contention for bronze medal final

=== First round ===
First round heats are held as follows:
Heat 1: 6th v 7th qualifier
Heat 2: 5th v 8th qualifier
Heat 3: 2nd v 3rd qualifier
Heat 4: 1st v 4th qualifier

The winners of heats 3 and 4 proceed to the gold medal final. The remaining 6 teams are ranked on time, from which the top 2 proceed to the bronze medal final.

Rank	Heat	Name	Nation	Time	Notes
1	3	Katie Archibald; Elinor Barker; Manon Lloyd; Emily Kay	Great Britain		QG
2	4	Elisa Balsamo; Tatiana Guderzo; Letizia Paternoster; Silvia Valsecchi	Italy	4:22.847	QG
3	4	Justyna Kaczkowska; Katarzyna Pawłowska; Daria Pikulik; Nikol Płosaj	Poland	4:24.872	QB
4	2	Laurie Berthon; Marion Borras; Élise Delzenne; Coralie Demay	France	4:25.680	QB
5	1	Gulnaz Badykova; Alexandra Chekina; Aleksandra Goncharova; Anastasiia Iakovenko	Russia	4:34.062	
6	1	Gilke Croket; Annelies Dom; Lotte Kopecky; Saartje Vandenbroucke	Belgium	4:35.264	
7	2	Katsiaryna Piatrouskaya; Palina Pivavarava; Tatsiana Sharakova; Hanna Tserakh	Belarus	4:35.273	
	3	Charlotte Becker; Lisa Brennauer; Lisa Klein; Gudrun Stock	Germany	DNF	

- QG = qualified for gold medal final
- QB = qualified for bronze medal final

=== Finals ===
The final classification is determined in the medal finals.

Rank	Name	Nation	Time	Notes
Bronze medal final
3rd place, bronze medalist(s)	Justyna Kaczkowska; Katarzyna Pawłowska; Daria Pikulik; Nikol Płosaj	Poland	4:24.705	
4	Laurie Berthon; Marion Borras; Élise Delzenne; Coralie Demay	France	4:26.116	
Gold medal final
1st place, gold medalist(s)	Elisa Balsamo; Tatiana Guderzo; Letizia Paternoster; Silvia Valsecchi	Italy	4:17.853	
2nd place, silver medalist(s)	Katie Archibald; Elinor Barker; Manon Lloyd; Emily Kay	Great Britain	4:21.164	
