= Amy Hill (disambiguation) =

Amy Hill (born 1953) is an actress.

Amy Hill may also refer to:

- Amy Hill (cyclist) (born 1995), Welsh racing cyclist
- Amy Hill, cover artist on It (novel)

== See also ==
- Amy Hill Hearth, author
