= 2013 UCI Track Cycling World Championships – Women's individual pursuit =

Rainbow jersey

The Women's individual pursuit at the 2013 UCI Track Cycling World Championships was held on February 20. 15 athletes participated in the contest. After the qualification, the fastest 2 riders advanced to the Final and the 3rd and 4th fastest riders raced for the bronze medal.

== Medalists ==
Gold	Sarah Hammer (USA)
Silver	Amy Cure (AUS)
Bronze	Annette Edmondson (AUS)

== Results ==
=== Qualifying ===
The qualifying was held at 14:40.

Rank	Name	Nation	Time	Notes
1	Sarah Hammer	United States	3:30.206	Q
2	Amy Cure	Australia	3:33.366	Q
3	Annette Edmondson	Australia	3:34.273	Q
4	Laura Brown	Canada	3:37.736	Q
5	Caroline Ryan	Ireland	3:38.269	
6	Lisa Brennauer	Germany	3:38.697	
7	Anna Nahirna	Ukraine	3:38.791	
8	Yudelmis Dominguez Masague	Cuba	3:42.528	
9	Eugenia Bujak	Poland	3:42.953	
10	Lucie Záleská	Czech Republic	3:43.054	
11	Anastasia Chulkova	Russia	3:44.218	
12	Mieke Kröger	Germany	3:45.968	
13	Els Belmans	Belgium	3:47.003	
14	Amy Pieters	Netherlands	3:49.182	
15	Maria Giulia Confalonieri	Italy	3:49.217	

=== Finals ===
The finals were held at 20:30.

==== Small Final ====
Rank	Name	Nation	Time	Notes
3rd place, bronze medalist(s)	Annette Edmondson	Australia	3:36.830	
4	Laura Brown	Canada	3:44.533	

==== Final ====
Rank	Name	Nation	Time	Notes
1st place, gold medalist(s)	Sarah Hammer	United States	3:32.050	
2nd place, silver medalist(s)	Amy Cure	Australia	3:40.685	
