= Emily Kay =

British cyclist (born 1995)

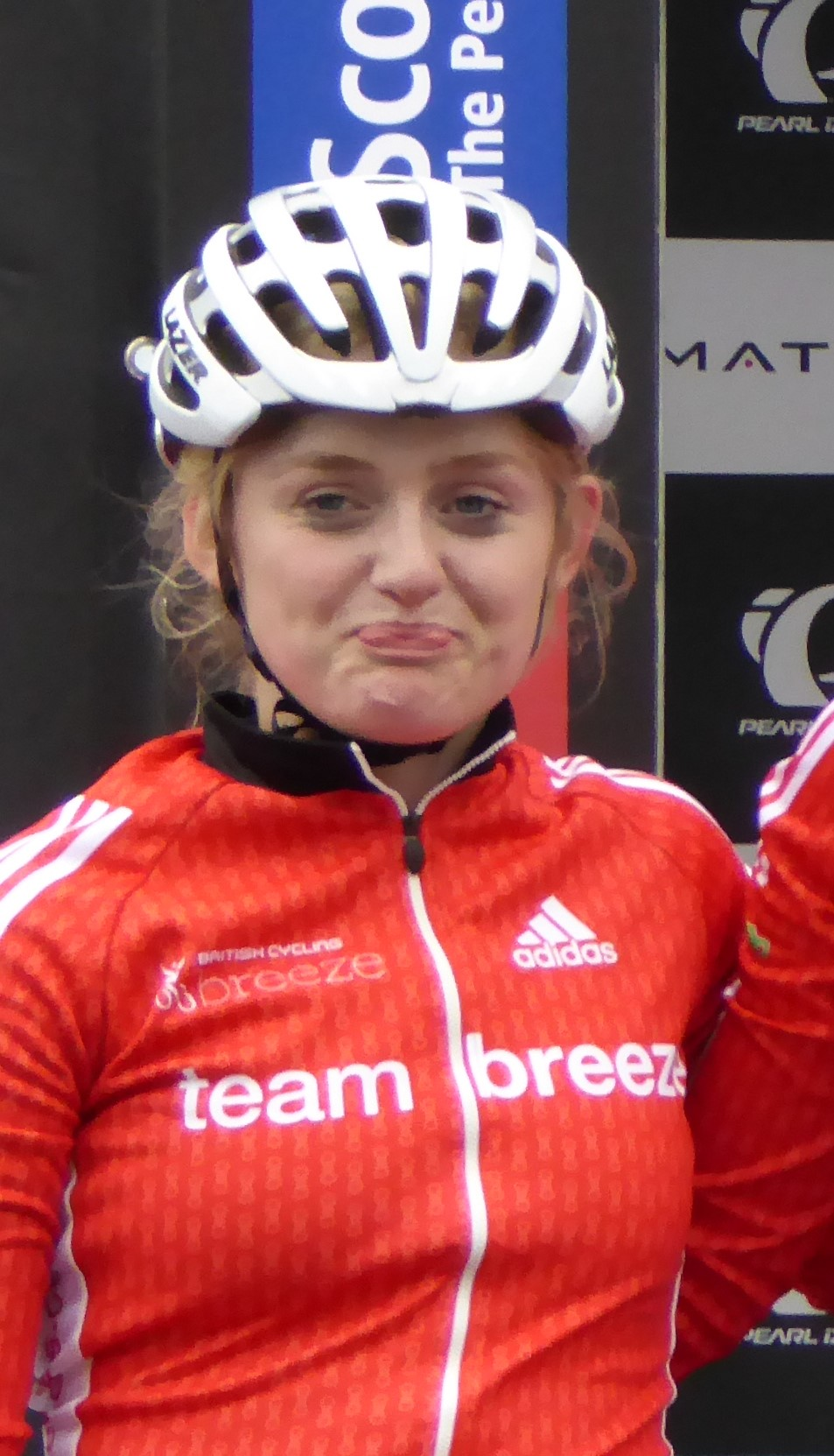
- Kay in 2016

Personal information
- Born: 7 September 1995 (age 31) Coventry, England

Cycling career
- Sport: Cycling
- Current team: Torelli
- Disciplines: Track; Road
- Role: Rider

Amateur teams
- 2003–2011: Halesowen A & CC
- 2012: Ikon–Mazda
- 2016: Team Breeze
- 2018–2021: Torelli–Beastwear–Brother

Professional teams
- 2013–2014: Team USN
- 2015–2016: Team USN
- 2017: Team WNT
- 2022–: Torelli–Cayman Islands–Scimitar
Medal record
Women's track cycling
Representing Great Britain
European Championships
Silver medal – second place	2018 Glasgow	Scratch race
Silver medal – second place	2016 Yvelines	Madison
Silver medal – second place	2017 Berlin	Team pursuit
Bronze medal – third place	2016 Yvelines	Team pursuit
Representing England
Commonwealth Games
Bronze medal – third place	2018 Gold Coast	Scratch race
Representing Ireland
European Championships
Bronze medal – third place	2021 Grenchen	Team pursuit

Emily Kay (born 7 September 1995) is a track and former road cyclist. After several years representing Great Britain and England at international competitions, Kay transferred allegiance in late 2019, and began representing Ireland on the UCI World Cup Track cycling circuit. She currently rides for UCI Women's Continental Team Torelli.

== Junior career ==
Kay partook in the 2009 School games and won the individual pursuit and finished second in the Keirin. At the 2010 national youth and junior track championships, Kay placed second in the junior points race, just three points behind Laura Trott. In addition, Kay placed second in the under 16's points race and won the under 16's individual pursuit and scratch race titles. Kay won three consecutive future stars series titles at revolution cycling series.

On 8 August 2013, at the Sir Chris Hoy Velodrome in Glasgow, Kay competed at the UCI Juniors Track World Championships. She was part of Britain's Team Pursuit squad which also included Hayley Jones, Amy Hill and Emily Nelson. In the qualifying heat, they broke the senior world record which had only been set a few weeks previously at the European Track Championships, setting a new time of 4:38.708. In the final, they broke the record once more, with a time of 4:35.085, beating Russia to become world champions.

== Senior career ==
At the 2009 Dudley Track Open Grand Prix Kay was the winner of the omnium event. Kay won the final stage at the 2012 Surf & Turf weekend to triumph overall. During the 2013 season Kay won the 2013 Hillingdon Grand Prix. At the Coupe de France Fenioux Piste which occurred just before the 2016 Olympic Games, Kay finished fourth in the Omnium. Kay then won the bronze medal at the 2016 UEC European Track Championships in the team pursuit. In November 2016 Kay joined Team WNT ahead of the 2017 season.

== Major results ==
2010
British National Youth Track Championships

1st Individual pursuit
1st Scratch
2nd Points race

2nd Points race, British National Junior Track Championships
2011
British National Youth Track Championships

1st Individual pursuit
1st Points race
1st Scratch
3rd Sprint

3rd Madison, British National Youth Track Championships (with Rebecca Hunt)
2012
British National Track Championships

1st Team pursuit
2nd Madison (with Amy Roberts)

British National Junior Track Championships

1st Scratch
3rd Individual pursuit

2013
UCI Juniors Track World Championships

1st Team pursuit (with Amy Hill, Hayley Jones and Emily Nelson)
3rd Omnium

British National Junior Track Championships

1st Individual pursuit
2nd Points race

Revolution

1st Scratch – Round 1, Manchester
2nd Scratch – Round 2, Glasgow

3rd Madison, British National Track Championships (with Hayley Jones)
2014
1st Scratch, Open des Nations sur Piste de Roubaix
2nd Scratch, British National Track Championships
2015
Revolution

1st Points race – Round 3, London
1st Scratch – Round 3, London
2nd Points race – Round 4, Glasgow
2nd Scratch – Round 5, London
2nd Scratch – Round 2, Manchester
3rd Points race – Round 2, Manchester
3rd Scratch – Round 3, Manchester

3rd Points race, British National Track Championships
6th London Nocturne
7th Women's Tour de Yorkshire
2016
2016–17 UCI Track Cycling World Cup

1st Team pursuit, Glasgow (with Ellie Dickinson, Manon Lloyd and Emily Nelson)
1st Omnium, Glasgow
2nd Omnium, Apeldoorn

UEC European Under-23 Track Championships

1st Team pursuit (with Dannielle Khan, Manon Lloyd and Emily Nelson)
3rd Omnium

Grand Prix of Poland

1st Scratch
2nd Points race

UEC European Track Championships

2nd Madison (with Emily Nelson)
3rd Team pursuit (with Dannielle Khan, Manon Lloyd and Emily Nelson)

2nd Points race, Revolution Champions League, Round 1 – Manchester
Revolution

3rd Points race, Round 1 – Manchester
3rd Points race, Round 5 – Manchester
3rd Scratch, Round 5 – Manchester

2017
Track Cycling Challenge

1st Madison (with Manon Lloyd)
1st Points race
3rd Omnium
3rd Scratch

2nd Team pursuit, UEC European Track Championships
3rd Team pursuit, 2017–18 UCI Track Cycling World Cup, Pruszków (with Neah Evans, Emily Nelson and Manon Lloyd)
3rd Individual pursuit, Dublin International
2018
2018–19 UCI Track Cycling World Cup

1st Team pursuit, Berlin
2nd Madison, Saint-Quentin-en-Yvelines (with Neah Evans)

2nd Scratch, UEC European Track Championships
British National Track Championships

2nd Points race
3rd Individual pursuit
3rd Madison (with Neah Evans)

3rd Scratch, Commonwealth Games
2020
3rd Omnium, 2019–20 UCI Track Cycling World Cup, Milton
2021
3rd Team pursuit, UEC European Track Championships
