= Amy Cure =

Australian cyclist (born 1992)

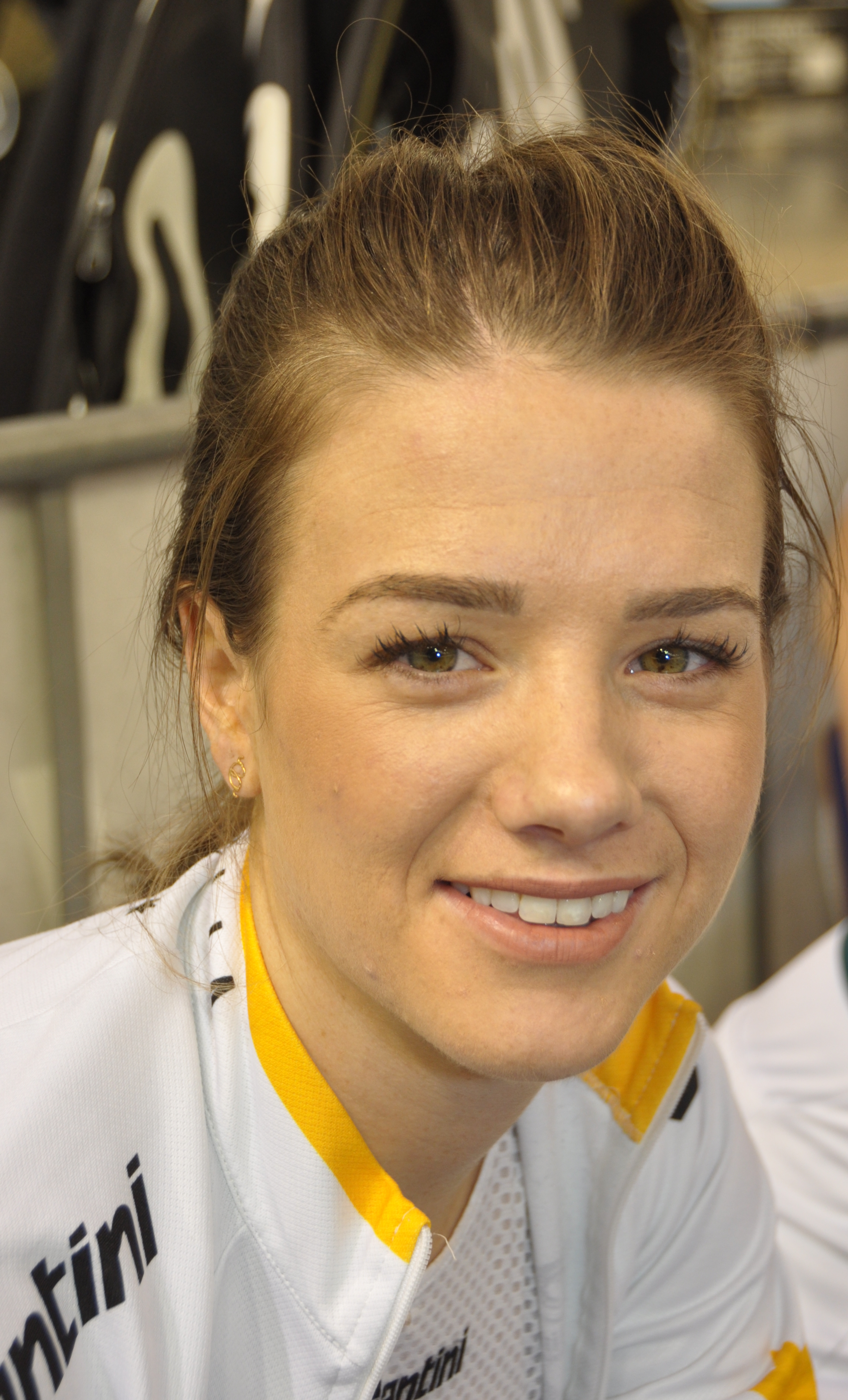
- Cure in 2018

Personal information
- Full name: Amy Louise Cure
- Nickname: Queen of the Apple Isle
- Born: 31 December 1992 (age 33) Burnie, Australia
- Height: 1.72 m (5 ft 8 in)
- Weight: 58 kg (128 lb)

Cycling career
- Sport: Cycling
- Current team: Wiggle High5
- Disciplines: Track; Road
- Role: Rider
- Rider type: Track endurance; Road sprinter

Amateur team
- Devonport Mersey Valley CC

Professional teams
- 2013: Orica–AIS (stagiaire)
- 2014–2015: Lotto–Intermarché Ladies
- 2017–: Wiggle High5
Medal record
Women's track cycling
Representing Australia
World Championships
Gold medal – first place	2014 Cali	Points race
Gold medal – first place	2015 Yvelines	Team pursuit
Gold medal – first place	2019 Pruszków	Team pursuit
Silver medal – second place	2013 Minsk	Individual pursuit
Silver medal – second place	2013 Minsk	Team pursuit
Silver medal – second place	2015 Yvelines	Scratch
Silver medal – second place	2017 Hong Kong	Team pursuit
Silver medal – second place	2019 Pruszków	Madison
Bronze medal – third place	2014 Cali	Individual pursuit
Bronze medal – third place	2014 Cali	Team pursuit
Bronze medal – third place	2015 Yvelines	Individual pursuit
Bronze medal – third place	2017 Hong Kong	Omnium
Bronze medal – third place	2017 Hong Kong	Madison
Commonwealth Games
Gold medal – first place	2018 Gold Coast	Team pursuit
Gold medal – first place	2018 Gold Coast	Scratch race
Silver medal – second place	2014 Glasgow	Scratch race
Bronze medal – third place	2014 Glasgow	Individual pursuit

Amy Louise Cure (born 31 December 1992) is an Australian former professional track cyclist. She cycles for Team Jayco–AIS. She has set several world records. She won a junior world championship race in 2009, and represented Australia at the 2012 Summer Olympics. She is the first person in history to medal at every endurance track event at world championship level; with three newly gained medals in the team pursuit, omnium, and madison at 2017 UCI Track Cycling World Championships in Hong Kong.

While Cure was considered a typical Tasmanian type of racer, with a never-give-up attitude during races, she was considered the latest cycling talent in Tasmania, following legendary 5-time world champion Danny Clark, Olympic gold medallist Michael Grenda and road cyclist Richie Porte.

== Personal ==
Amy Louise Cure was born on 31 December 1992. She is from coastal Tasmania, near West Pine, and resides in Tasmania, Australia. She attended Leighland Christian School, and supports the Carlton Blues.

== Cycling ==
Cure is a track cyclist, specialising in endurance track events. She also does endurance track races and road races. She started cycling in 2005 after she attended the Tasmanian SCAT Christmas Carnivals. She is affiliated with the Tasmanian Institute of Sports, and the Devonport Mersey Valley CC. In 2010, she was coached by the most successful Belgian retired track cyclist Matthew Gilmore and is now coached by Darryl Pugh. She cycles for Team Jayco–AIS. She has broken some track cycling world records including the 2 km individual pursuit record. She spends time in South Australia, where she trains away from her support structure. Cure took advantage of an athlete "adoption" programme that helps elite athlete orphans living far away from home that placed her with a local, Adelaide area family.

=== By year ===
==== 2006 ====
Cure competed in several races in 2006. She finished first in the U15 Individual Pursuit Australia Junior Track Titles in Western Australia. She finished first in the U15 Road Race Australia Junior Road Titles in Queensland. She finished second in the U15 Time Trial Australia Junior Track Titles in Western Australia. She finished second in the U15 Time Trial Australia Junior Road Titles in Queensland. She finished third in the U15 Sprint Australia Junior Track Titles in Western Australia. She finished fifth in the U15 Scratch Race Australia Junior Track Titles in Western Australia. She finished fifth in the U15 Criterium Australia Junior Road Titles in Queensland.

==== 2007 ====
Cure competed in several races in 2007. She finished second in the U17 Pairs Time Trial Australia Junior Road Titles in the Australian Capital Territory. She finished third in the U17 Individual Pursuit Australian Junior Track Titles in New South Wales. She finished third in the U17 Team Sprint Australia Junior Track Titles in New South Wales. She finished third in the U17 Criterium Australia Junior Road Titles in the Australian Capital Territory. She finished fourth in the U17 Sprint Australia Junior Track Titles in New South Wales. She finished seventh in the U17 Road Race Australia Junior Road Titles in the Australian Capital Territory.

==== 2008 ====
Cure competed in several races in 2008. She finished first in the U17 Scratch Race Australia Junior Track Titles in New South Wales. She finished first in the U17 Road Race Australia Junior Road Titles in the Australian Capital Territory. She finished second in the U17 Individual Pursuit Australia Junior Track Titles in New South Wales. She finished third in the U17 Sprint Australia Junior Track Titles in New South Wales. She finished third in the U17 Team Sprint Australia Junior Track Titles in New South Wales. She finished third in the U17 Time Trial Australia Junior Road Titles in the Australian Capital Territory. She finished fifth in the U17 Criterium Australia Junior Road Titles in the Australian Capital Territory. She finished seventh in the U17 Time Trial Australia Junior Track Titles in New South Wales.

==== 2009 ====
Cure competed in several races in 2009. She finished first in the Scratch Race UCI Junior World Championships in Russia. In the Scratch Race UCI Junior World Championships, she beat Czech cyclist Lucie Záleská and Lithuanian Aleksandra Sošenko. She finished first in the U19 Individual Pursuit Australian Championships in South Australia. She finished first in the Scratch Race Australia Youth Olympic Festival in Australia. She finished first in the Points Race Australia Youth Olympic Festival in Australia. She finished first in the overall U19 Mersey Valley Tour in Victoria. She finished second in the U19 Individual Pursuit Junior World Championships in Russia. She finished second in the Stage 1 TT Mersey Valley Tour in Victoria. She finished second in the U19 Scratch Race Australian Championships in South Australia. She finished second in the U19 time trial Australian Championships in Queensland. She finished third in the Open Women's Team Pursuit Australian Championships in South Australia. She finished third in the Individual Pursuit Australia Youth Olympic Festival in Australia. She finished fifth in the U19 Omnium Australian Championships in South Australia. She finished sixth in the U19 Keirin Australian Championships in South Australia. She finished sixth in the U19 road race Australian Championships in Queensland. She finished twelfth in the U19 Time Trial Australian Championships in South Australia.

==== 2010 ====
In 2010, as a seventeen-year-old, Cure was described as "the next big thing in women's cycling." She competed in several races in 2010. She finished first in the Individual Pursuit UCI Junior Track World Championships in Italy. She finished first in the Teams Pursuit UCI Junior Track World Championships in Italy. She finished first in the Scratch Race UCI Junior Track World Championships in Italy. She finished first in the U19 Road Time Trial Australian Road Championships in New South Wales. She finished first in the U19 Points Race Australian Championships in South Australia. She finished first in the U19 Individual Pursuit Australian Championships in South Australia. She finished second in the Omnium Australian Championships in South Australia. She finished second in the Teams Pursuit Australian Championships in South Australia. She finished second in the Scratch Race Australian Championships in South Australia. She finished second in the U19 Selection Road Race Australian Road Championships in New South Wales. She finished second in the U19 Criterium Australian Road Championships in New South Wales. She finished third in the Time Trial UCI Junior Road World Championships in Italy. She finished third in the U19 Road Race Australian Road Championships in New South Wales.

==== 2011 ====
Cure competed in several races in 2011. She finished second in the Individual Pursuit Cycling Australia Track National Championships in New South Wales. She finished second in the U23 Time Trial Cycling Australia Road National Championships in Victoria. She finished third in the Scratch Race World Cup in Manchester and in the Overall Standings 10/11 UCI Track Cycling World Cup Classics. She finished third in the Scratch Race 10/11 UCI Track World Cup – Manchester Round in Great Britain. She finished third in the Scratch Race Cycling Australia Track National Championships in New South Wales. She finished third in the Points Race Cycling Australia Track National Championships in New South Wales. She finished fourth in the Team Pursuit Track World Championships in the Netherlands. She finished fourth in the Team Pursuit UCI Track World Championships in the Netherlands. She finished fifth in the Omnium Cycling Australia Track National Championships in New South Wales. She finished fifth in the U23 Criterium Cycling Australia Road National Championships in Victoria. She finished eighth in the Omnium UCI Track World Championships in the Netherlands.

==== 2012 ====
In February at the World Cup in London, Cure finished third in the team pursuit and individual pursuit events. She competed in the World Track Cycling Championships in Melbourne in the team pursuit event. She also competed in the 3000m event. In 2012, she won the second stage of the RaboSter Tour in the Netherlands. She finished fourth in the third stage. She finished second overall.

=== National team ===
Cure has been a member of the Australian national cycling team in several events including the 2009 Australian Youth Olympic Festival, the 2009 World Junior Track Championships in Russia, the 2010 Track World Cup Manchester in the Great Britain, the 2010 UCI Junior Road World Championships in Italy, the 2011 Track World Championships in the Netherlands, 2011/12 UCI Track Cycling World Cup London in Great Britain, and the 2012 Track World Championships. She qualified for the 2012 Summer Olympics in May 2012 as a nineteen-year-old, where she competed in the women's team pursuit event alongside Melissa Hoskins, Josie Tomic and Annette Edmondson.

== Recognition ==
Cure was named the TIS Young Athlete of the Year in 2009. In 2010, she was named the Australian Junior Female Road Cyclist of the Year and Australian Junior Female Track Cyclist of the Year. She was awarded the AIS Sport Performance Awards Junior Athlete for the Year for 2014.

== Palmarès ==
2007
3rd in Burnie Road Race
2008
3rd Points Race, Latrobe Carnival
3rd Points Race, Devonport Carnival
2009
UCI Juniors Track World Championships

1st Scratch race
2nd Individual pursuit

National Junior Track Cycling Championships

1st Individual pursuit
2nd Scratch race
3rd Individual pursuit

1st Overall Canberra Women's Tour

1st stage 3

3rd Overall Mersey Valley Tour

2010
National Junior Track Cycling Championships

1st Individual pursuit
1st Points race
2nd Team pursuit
2nd Scratch race
2nd Omnium

1st National Juniors Time Trial Championships
1st Stages 1 & 4 Canberra Women's Tour
3rd World Junior Time Trial Championships
3rd National Juniors Road Race Championships

2011
1st Ronde van de Bakkerstraat
1st Profronde van Stiphout
2nd National U23 Time Trial Championships
National Track Championships

2nd Individual pursuit
2nd Team pursuit
3rd Scratch race
3rd Points race

3rd Track Cycling World Cup – Manchester (Scratch race)
4th World Track Championships (Team pursuit)

2012
1st Ronde van Haren
2nd Overall RaboSter Zeeuwsche Eilanden

1st stage 2

2nd Ronde van Uitgeest
3rd Track Cycling World Cup – London (Individual pursuit)
3rd Track Cycling World Cup – London (Team pursuit)
4th World Track Championships (Individual pursuit)

2013
1st Overall Jarvis Subaru Adelaide Tour

1st Stage 1 (TTT) & 2

1st Overall Czech Tour

1st Stages 2 & 4

2nd World Track Championships (Individual pursuit)
2nd National Track Championships (Individual pursuit)
2nd Ronde van Luykgestel
2nd Overall Molenomloop van de Schermer

2014
1st World Track Championships (Points race)
National Track Championships

1st Individual pursuit
1st Team pursuit

Commonwealth Games

2nd Scratch race
3rd Individual pursuit

3rd World Track Championships (Individual pursuit)

2015
1st World Track Championships (Team pursuit)
National Track Championships

1st Individual pursuit
1st Team pursuit

1st Track Cycling World Cup – Cambridge (NZL) (Team pursuit)
2nd World Track Championships (Scratch race)
3rd World Track Championships (Individual pursuit)

2016
National Track Championships

1st Points race
1st Scratch race
1st Omnium
2nd Individual pursuit

Oceania Track Championships

1st Madison (with Annette Edmondson)
1st Omnium
1st Team pursuit (with Ashlee Ankudinoff, Annette Edmondson and Alexandra Manly)
2nd Points race
2nd Scratch race

2nd National Track Championships (Individual pursuit)
3rd Six Days of Ghent

2017
1st Six Day Melbourne (with Ashlee Ankudinoff)
National Track Championships

1st Points race
1st Scratch race

UCI World Track Championships

2nd Team Pursuit
3rd Madison (with Alexandra Manly)
3rd Omnium

2018
Commonwealth Games

1st Team Pursuit
1st Scratch Race

National Track Championships

1st Points race
1st Scratch race
2nd Individual Pursuit
