= Cycling at the 2014 Commonwealth Games – Women's individual pursuit =

Cycling Track – Women's individual pursuit at the 2014 Commonwealth Games
- Venue: Sir Chris Hoy Velodrome
- Dates: 25 July 2014
- Competitors: 20 from 10 nations

Medalists
gold medal	Joanna Rowsell	England
silver medal	Annette Edmondson	Australia
bronze medal	Amy Cure	Australia

The Women's individual pursuit at the 2014 Commonwealth Games, was part of the cycling programme, which took place on 25 July 2014.

== Results ==
=== Qualifying ===
Rank	Rider	Time	Average Speed (km/h)	Notes
1	Joanna Rowsell (ENG)	3:29.038	51.665	Q, GR
2	Annette Edmondson (AUS)	3:30.728	51.250	Q
3	Amy Cure (AUS)	3:31.543	51.053	Q
4	Katie Archibald (SCO)	3:33.526	50.579	Q
5	Jaime Nielsen (NZL)	3:34.342	50.386	
6	Laura Trott (ENG)	3:35.213	50.182	
7	Elinor Barker (WAL)	3:36.803	49.814	
8	Dani King (ENG)	3:38.084	49.522	
9	Lauren Ellis (NZL)	3:39.716	49.154	
10	Laura Brown (CAN)	3:40.035	49.083	
11	Jasmin Glaesser (CAN)	3:40.050	49.079	
12	Anna Turvey (SCO)	3:40.525	48.974	
13	Amy Roberts (WAL)	3:42.623	48.512	
14	Stephanie Roorda (CAN)	3:42.924	48.447	
15	Ciara Horne (WAL)	3:45.119	47.974	
16	Georgia Williams (NZL)	3:45.334	47.928	
17	Sunita Yanglem (IND)	4:07.614	43.616	
18	Tamiko Butler (ANT)	4:08.979	43.377	
19	Bianca Hernould (JAM)	4:19.202	41.666	
20	Rahila Bano (PAK)	DNS		

=== Finals ===
Rank	Rider	Time	Average Speed (km/h)	Notes
Gold Medal Races
1st place, gold medalist(s)	Joanna Rowsell (ENG)	3:31.615	51.036	
2nd place, silver medalist(s)	Annette Edmondson (AUS)	3:35.450	50.127	
Bronze Medal Races
3rd place, bronze medalist(s)	Amy Cure (AUS)	3:35.384	50.143	
4	Katie Archibald (SCO)	3:37.078	49.751	
