= 2016 UEC European Track Championships – Women's team pursuit =

Women's team pursuit at the 2016 UEC European Track Championships
- UEC European Champion jersey
- Venue: Vélodrome de Saint-Quentin-en-Yvelines, Yvelines
- Date: 19–20 October
- Competitors: 46 from 10 nations

Medalists
gold medal	Elisa Balsamo; Tatiana Guderzo; Simona Frapporti; Silvia Valsecchi; Francesca Pattaro	Italy
silver medal	Justyna Kaczkowska; Katarzyna Pawłowska; Daria Pikulik; Nikol Płosaj; Łucja Pietrzak	Poland
bronze medal	Emily Kay; Dannielle Khan; Manon Lloyd; Emily Nelson	Great Britain

The Women's team pursuit was held on 19–20 October 2016.

== Results ==
=== Qualifying ===
The fastest 8 teams qualify for the first round, from which the top 4 remain in contention for the gold medal final and the other 4 for the bronze medal final.

Rank	Name	Nation	Time	Notes
1	Elisa Balsamo; Tatiana Guderzo; Simona Frapporti; Silvia Valsecchi	Italy	4:26.413	Q
2	Justyna Kaczkowska; Łucja Pietrzak; Daria Pikulik; Nikol Płosaj	Poland	4:28.432	Q
3	Emily Kay; Dannielle Khan; Manon Lloyd; Emily Nelson	Great Britain	4:29.732	Q
4	Hanna Laptsionak; Palina Pivavarava; Ina Savenka; Tatsiana Sharakova	Belarus	4:32.998	Q
5	Gilke Croket; Annelies Dom; Lotte Kopecky; Kaat Van der Meulen	Belgium	4:35.230	q
6	Gulnaz Badykova; Anastasiia Iakovenko; Elizaveta Oshurkova; Kseniia Tsymbalyuk	Russia	4:36.185	q
7	Élise Delzenne; Coralie Demay; Roxane Fournier; Pascale Jeuland	France	4:36.254	q
8	Lydia Boylan; Eileen Burns; Lydia Gurley; Anna Turvey	Ireland	4:40.347	q
9	Oksana Kliachina; Tetyana Klimchenko; Inna Metalnikova; Anna Nahirna	Ukraine	4:41.448	
10	Charlotte Becker; Michaela Ebert; Tatjana Paller; Gudrun Stock	Germany	4:43.792	

- Q = qualified; in contention for gold medal final
- q = qualified; in contention for bronze medal final

=== First round ===
First round heats are held as follows:
Heat 1: 6th v 7th qualifier
Heat 2: 5th v 8th qualifier
Heat 3: 2nd v 3rd qualifier
Heat 4: 1st v 4th qualifier

The winners of heats 3 and 4 proceed to the gold medal final. The remaining 6 teams are ranked on time, from which the top 2 proceed to the bronze medal final.

Rank	Heat	Name	Nation	Time	Notes
1	4	Francesca Pattaro; Tatiana Guderzo; Simona Frapporti; Silvia Valsecchi	Italy	4:25.479	QG
2	3	Justyna Kaczkowska; Łucja Pietrzak; Daria Pikulik; Nikol Płosaj	Poland	4:26.119	QG
3	3	Emily Kay; Dannielle Khan; Manon Lloyd; Emily Nelson	Great Britain	4:27.298	QB
4	1	Élise Delzenne; Coralie Demay; Roxane Fournier; Laurie Berthon	France	4:30.306	QB
5	4	Maryna Shmayankova; Palina Pivavarava; Ina Savenka; Tatsiana Sharakova	Belarus	4:31.809	
6	2	Gilke Croket; Annelies Dom; Lotte Kopecky; Lenny Druyts	Belgium	4:33.589	
7	1	Gulnaz Badykova; Anastasiia Iakovenko; Elizaveta Oshurkova; Alexandra Chekina	Russia	4:34.368	
8	2	Lydia Boylan; Eileen Burns; Lydia Gurley; Anna Turvey	Ireland	4:43.802	

- QG = qualified for gold medal final
- QB = qualified for bronze medal final

=== Finals ===
The final classification is determined in the medal finals.

Rank	Name	Nation	Time	Notes
Bronze medal final
3rd place, bronze medalist(s)	Emily Kay; Dannielle Khan; Manon Lloyd; Emily Nelson	Great Britain	4:26.744	
4	Élise Delzenne; Coralie Demay; Roxane Fournier; Laurie Berthon	France	4:33.427	
Gold medal final
1st place, gold medalist(s)	Elisa Balsamo; Tatiana Guderzo; Simona Frapporti; Silvia Valsecchi	Italy	4:22.314	
2nd place, silver medalist(s)	Justyna Kaczkowska; Katarzyna Pawłowska; Daria Pikulik; Nikol Płosaj	Poland	4:27.845	
