= Amy King (cyclist) =

Welsh cyclist

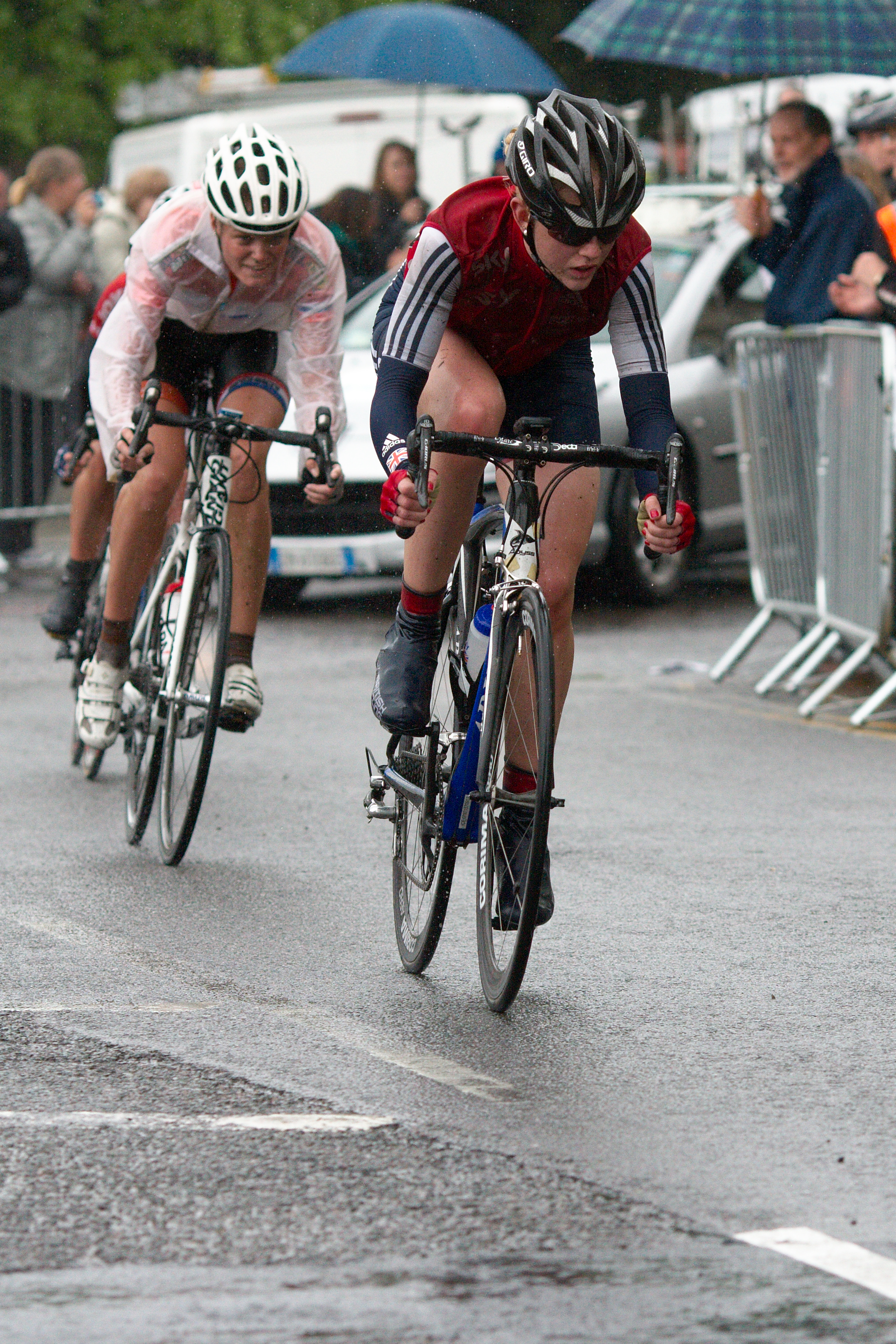
- King at the 2014 The Women's Tour

Personal information
- Full name: Amy King
- Born: Amy Hill; 4 July 1995 (age 31) Newport, Wales

Cycling career
- Sport: Cycling
- Current team: Retired
- Disciplines: Track; Road
- Role: Rider
- Rider type: Pursuitist (track)

Amateur teams
- 2006–2011: Newport Youth Velo Cycling Club
- 2012–2013: Abergavenny RC Women's Team
- 2014: Fusion RT Fierlan
- 2016: Team Rytger
- 2017: Team OnForm
- 2018: Maaslandster International Women's Cycling Team
- 2019: Jadan–Weldtite p/b Vive Le Velo

Professional team
- 2015: Team Rytger

Amy King (née Hill; born 4 July 1995) is a British former racing cyclist from Newport, Wales. She was a member of the record breaking, gold medal winning, British team pursuit squad at the Juniors world championships in 2013.

== Career ==
On 8 August 2013, at the Sir Chris Hoy Velodrome in Glasgow, King competed at the UCI Juniors Track World Championships. She was part of Britain's Team Pursuit squad which also included Hayley Jones, Emily Kay and Emily Nelson. In the qualifying heat, they broke the senior world record which had only been set a few weeks previously at the European Track Championships, setting a new time of 4:38.708. In the final, they broke the record once more, with a time of 4:35.085, beating Russia to become world champions.

King represented Wales at the 2014 Commonwealth Games in Glasgow.

== Major results ==
2011
2nd Individual pursuit, National Youth Track Championships
2012
3rd Points race, National Junior Track Championships
2013
1st Team pursuit, UCI Juniors Track World Championships (with Hayley Jones, Emily Kay & Emily Nelson)
1st Points race, National Junior Track Championships
Ghent International Junior Track Meeting

3rd Team pursuit (with Rebecca Hunt and Manon Lloyd)
3rd Omnium

2015
8th Women's Tour de Yorkshire
2018
9th Omloop der Kempen
