= Hayley Jones (cyclist) =

Welsh racing cyclist

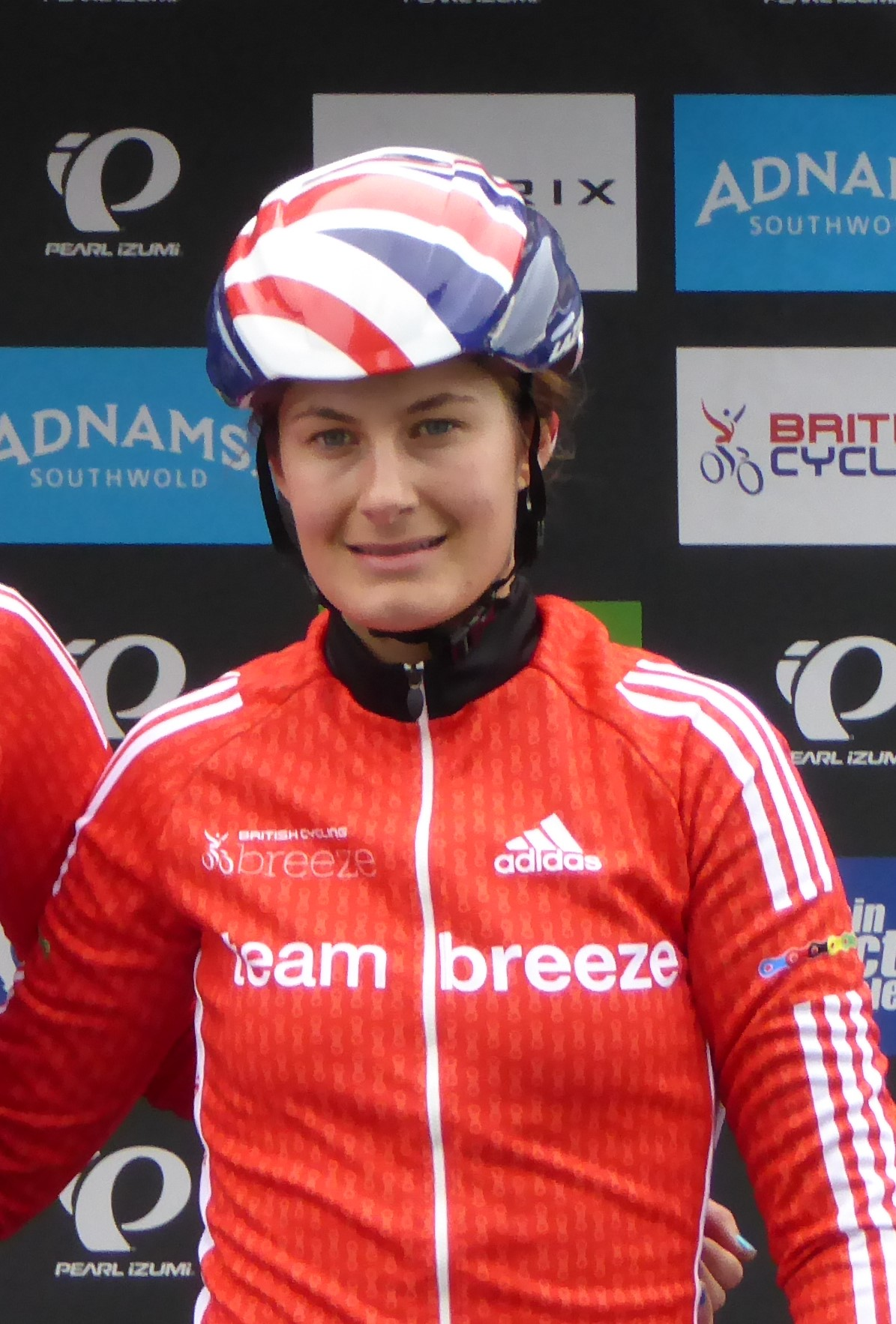
- Jones in 2016.

Personal information
- Full name: Hayley Louise Jones
- Born: 26 September 1995 (age 31) Neath, Neath Port Talbot, Wales
- Height: 1.7 m (5 ft 7 in)
- Weight: 64 kg (141 lb)

Cycling career
- Sport: Cycling
- Disciplines: Track; Road
- Role: Rider
- Rider type: Pursuitist

Amateur teams
- 2004–2012: Port Talbot Wheelers
- 2013: Node 4–Giordana Racing
- 2014: Madison–Boot Out Breast Cancer Care
- 2016: Team Breeze

Professional teams
- 2016: Podium Ambition Pro Cycling
- 2017–2018: Team WNT

Hayley Louise Jones (born 26 September 1995) is a Welsh racing cyclist, who last rode for UCI Women's Team WNT–Rotor Pro Cycling. From Port Talbot, Jones was a member of the record breaking, gold medal winning, British team pursuit squad at the Juniors world championships in 2013.

== Early career ==
Hayley Jones is the daughter of Phil and Louise Jones, the sprint gold medalist for Wales at the 1990 Commonwealth Games.

Jones was part of British Cycling's Olympic Development Programme for 2012/2013.

She was a member of the bronze medal-winning British team pursuit squad at the Junior world championships in 2012. That year, she was living with her family in Brisbane, Australia, Jones teamed up with Taylah Jennings and Alexandra O'Dea, to win gold in the junior team pursuit at the Australian National Track Championships.

On 8 August 2013, at the Sir Chris Hoy Velodrome in Glasgow, Jones competed at the UCI Juniors Track World Championships. She was part of Britain's Team Pursuit squad which also included Amy Hill, Emily Kay and Emily Nelson. In the qualifying heat, they broke the world record which had only been set a few weeks previously at the European Track Championships, setting a new time of 4:38.708. In the final, they broke the record once more, with a time of 4:35.085, beating Russia to become world champions. She then went on to win Bronze in the 20-kilometre (12-mile) Points Race.

Jones represented Wales at the Commonwealth Games in Glasgow, 2014, finishing 20th in the points race.

== Major results ==
2012
1st Team pursuit, Australian National Junior Track Championships (with Taylah Jennings & Alexandra O'Dea)
3rd Team pursuit, UCI Juniors Track World Championships (with Elinor Barker & Amy Roberts)

2013
UCI Juniors Track World Championships

1st Team pursuit (with Amy Hill, Emily Kay & Emily Nelson)
3rd Points race

3rd Points race, British National Junior Track Championships
2017
1st Scratch, International track race – Panevežys
