= Eileen Burns =

Irish track cyclist

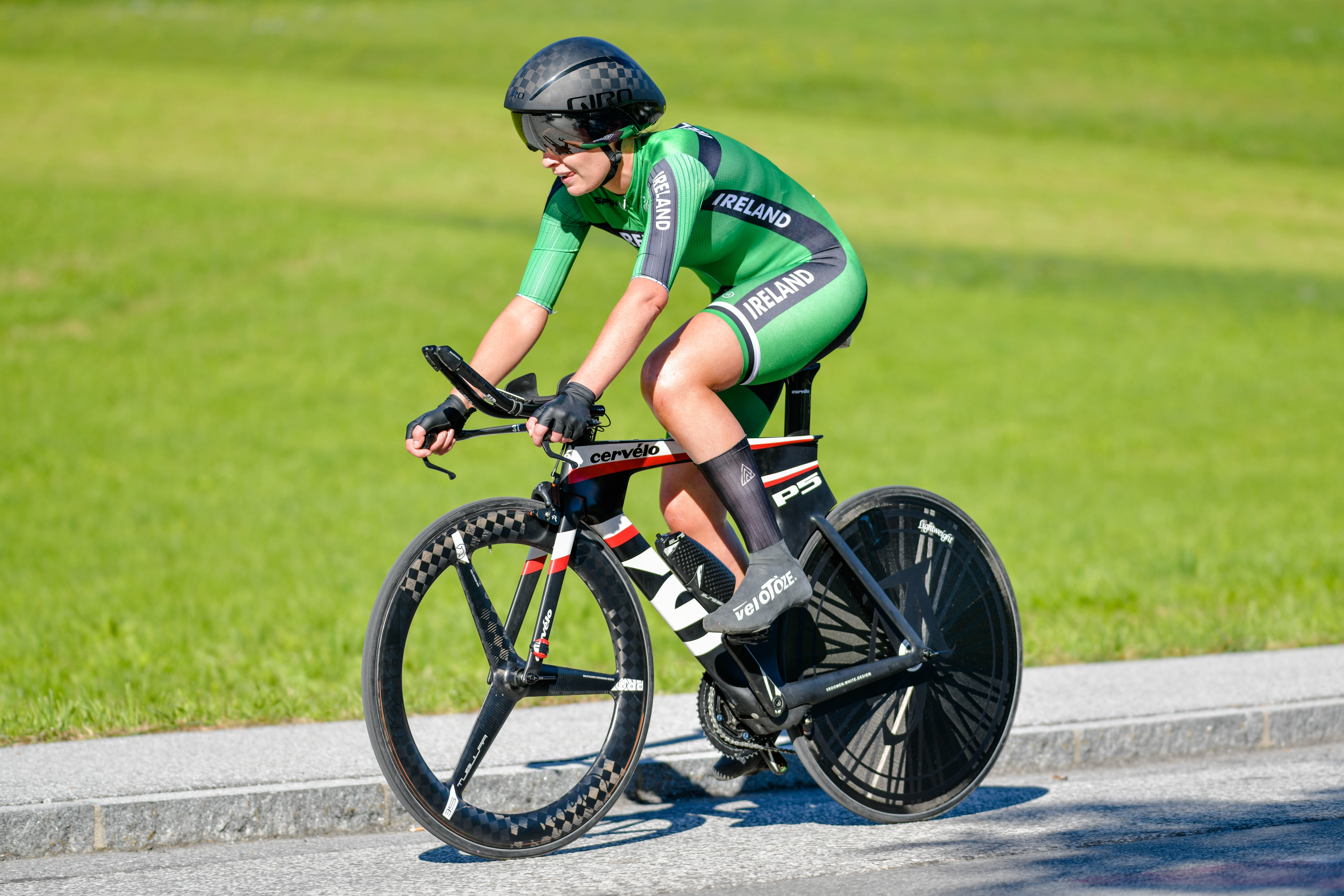
- Eileen Burns in 2018

Personal information
- Born: 17 February 1989 (age 37)

Cycling career
- Sport: Cycling
- Discipline: Track cycling

Eileen Burns (born 17 February 1989) is an Irish track cyclist, representing Ireland at international competitions. She competed at the 2016 UEC European Track Championships in the individual pursuit event and team pursuit event.

== Career results ==
2016
Dublin Track Cycling International

1st Individual Pursuit
