= Tamiko Butler =

Antiguan cyclist

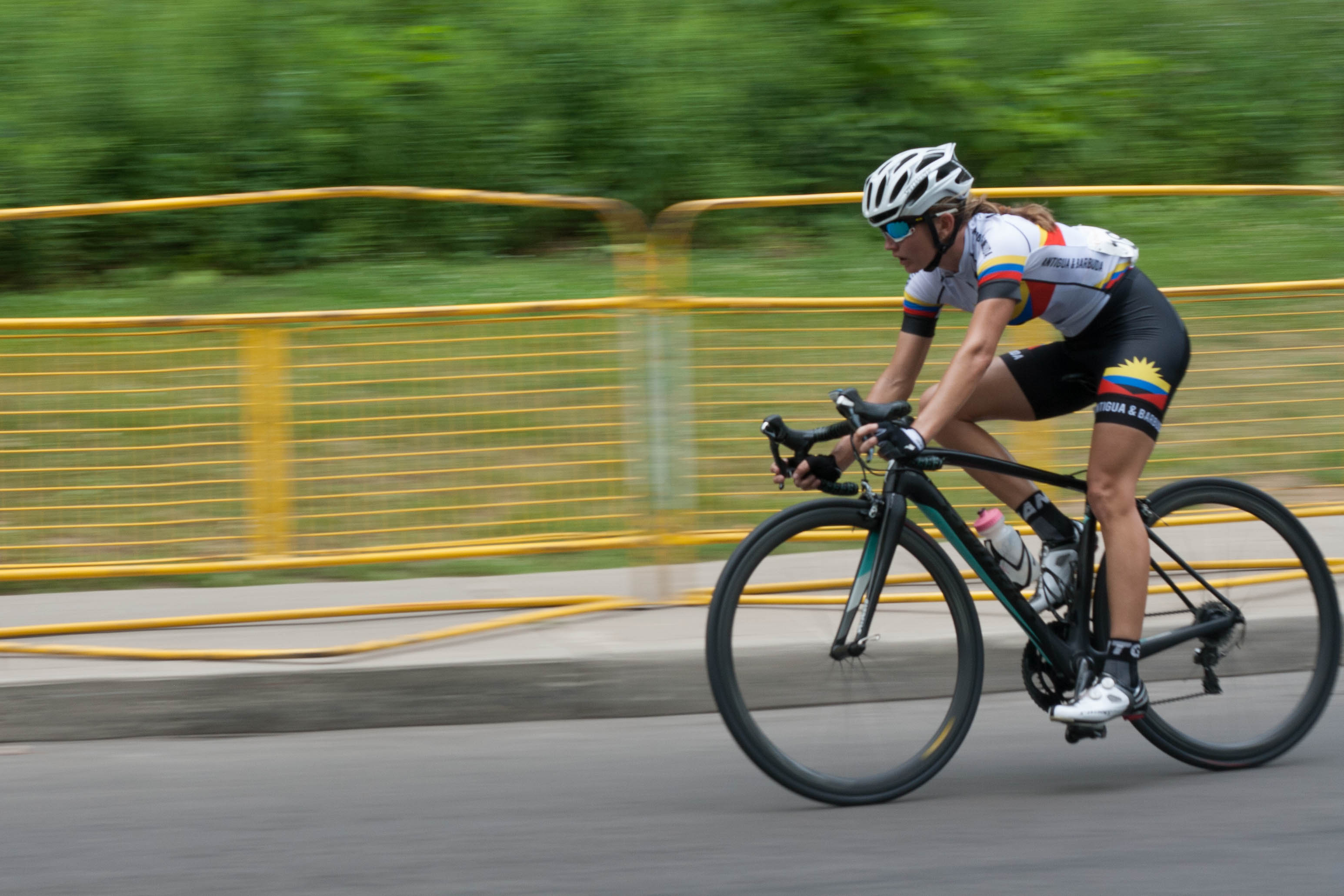
- Butler at the 2015 Pan American Games

Personal information
- Born: 4 January 1991 (age 35) St. John's, Antigua and Barbuda
- Height: 167 cm (5 ft 6 in)

Cycling career
- Sport: Cycling
- Current team: Retired
- Disciplines: Road; Track
- Role: Rider

Amateur teams
- 2014: WyndyMilla–Reynolds
- 2015: Corley Cycles–Drops RT (guest)

Professional team
- 2016: Drops

Major wins
- One day races & Classics National Time Trial Championships (2009–2012, 2014, 2016) National Road Race Championships (2009, 2011–2013, 2015, 2016)

Tamiko Butler (born 4 January 1991) is a triathlete and former road cyclist from Antigua and Barbuda. She became Antigua and Barbuda national road champion in 2009, 2010, 2012 and 2014. She represented her nation at the 2011 Pan American Games in the road race and time trial and at the 2014 Commonwealth Games in the road race, individual pursuit, points race and scratch race. She also competed at the 2015 Pan American Games. She was named as Antigua and Barbuda's sportswoman of the year in 2011.

== Major results ==
2009
National Road Championships

1st Time trial
1st Road race

2010
1st Time trial, National Road Championships
2011
1st Time trial, Caribbean Road Championships
National Road Championships

1st Time trial
1st Road race

2012
Caribbean Road Championships

1st Road race
3rd Time trial

National Road Championships

1st Time trial
1st Road race

2013
Caribbean Road Championships

1st Road race
2nd Time trial

1st Road race, National Road Championships
2014
1st Time trial, National Road Championships
2015
1st Road race, National Road Championships
2016
National Road Championships

1st Time trial
1st Road race
