= Cycling at the 2014 Commonwealth Games – Women's scratch race =

Cycling Track – Women's scratch race at the 2014 Commonwealth Games
- Venue: Sir Chris Hoy Velodrome
- Dates: 26 July 2014
- Competitors: 24 from 11 nations

Medalists
| gold medal | Annette Edmondson | Australia |
| silver medal | Amy Cure | Australia |
| bronze medal | Elinor Barker | Wales |

The Women's scratch race at the 2014 Commonwealth Games, as part of the cycling programme, took place on 26 July 2014. Australian Annette Edmondson and Amy Cure came first respectively second – with Elinor Barker from Wales finishing third. The event was held at Sir Chris Hoy Velodrome in Glasgow, Scotland. A total of 24 competitors, including one not starting and three not finishing, from 11 nations took part of the race.

== Results ==
| Rank | Rider | Notes |
|---|---|---|
| 1st place, gold medalist(s) | Annette Edmondson (AUS) | 12:53 |
| 2nd place, silver medalist(s) | Amy Cure (AUS) | |
| 3rd place, bronze medalist(s) | Elinor Barker (WAL) | |
| 4 | Dani King (ENG) | |
| 5 | Katie Archibald (SCO) | |
| 6 | Jupha Somnet (MAS) | |
| 7 | Katie Curtis (WAL) | |
| 8 | Eileen Roe (SCO) | |
| 9 | Lauren Ellis (NZL) | |
| 10 | Jasmin Glaesser (CAN) | |
| 11 | Laura Trott (ENG) | |
| 12 | Rushlee Buchanan (NZL) | |
| 13 | Amy Roberts (WAL) | |
| 14 | Lydia Helene Boylan (NIR) | |
| 15 | Melissa Hoskins (AUS) | |
| 16 | Stephanie Roorda (CAN) | |
| 17 | Charline Joiner (SCO) | |
| 18 | Laura Brown (CAN) | |
| 19 | Joanna Rowsell (ENG) | |
| 20 | Georgia Williams (NZL) | |
| 21 | Tamiko Butler (ANT) | DNF |
| 22 | Sunita Yanglem (IND) | DNF |
| 23 | Bianca Hernould (JAM) | DNF |
| 24 | Fatehah Mustapa (MAS) | DNS |
