= Daria Pikulik =

Polish cyclist (born 1997)

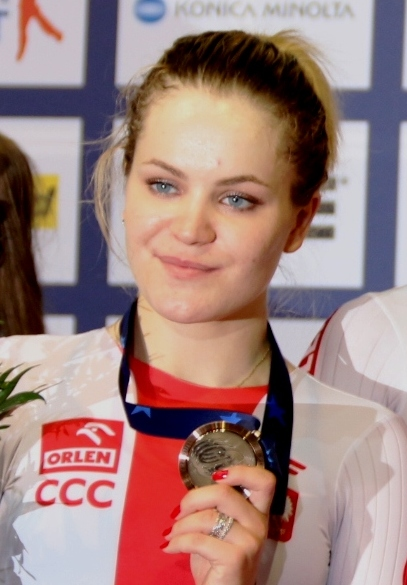
- Pikulik in 2017

Personal information
- Born: 6 January 1997 (age 29) Skarżysko-Kamienna, Poland
- Height: 1.65 m (5 ft 5 in)
- Weight: 54 kg (119 lb)

Cycling career
- Sport: Cycling
- Current team: Human Powered Health
- Disciplines: Road; Track
- Role: Rider

Professional teams
- 2017: Cervélo–Bigla Pro Cycling
- 2022: ATOM Deweloper Posciellux.pl Wrocław
- 2023–: Human Powered Health
Medal record
Women's track cycling
Representing Poland
Olympic Games
Silver medal – second place	Paris 2024	Omnium
World Championships
Bronze medal – third place	2020 Berlin	Omnium
European Championships
Silver medal – second place	2016 Yvelines	Team pursuit
Silver medal – second place	2023 Grenchen	Omnium
Bronze medal – third place	2017 Berlin	Team pursuit
Bronze medal – third place	2021 Grenchen	Scratch
Bronze medal – third place	2022 Munich	Omnium
Bronze medal – third place	2023 Grenchen	Scratch
Women's road bicycle racing
European Championships
Bronze medal – third place	2024 Limburg	Road race

Daria Pikulik (born 6 January 1997) is a Polish professional road and track cyclist, who currently rides for UCI Women's WorldTeam Human Powered Health. She won a silver medal at the 2024 Olympic Games and a bronze medal at the 2020 Cycling World Championships. She also rode in the women's team pursuit at the 2016 UCI Track Cycling World Championships. Her sister, Wiktoria, is also a professional cyclist.

In October 2026, the International Testing Agency (ITA) reported that Pikulik has been issued with an eighteen-month ban that operated from December 2024 to June 2026 for an anti-doping rule violation relating to whereabouts failures (three missed tests).

== Major results ==
2014
2nd Time trial, National Junior Road Championships
9th Time trial, UCI Junior Road World Championships
2015
1st Points race, Grand Prix of Poland
National Junior Road Championships

1st Time trial
2nd Road race

7th Time trial, UCI Junior Road World Championships
2016
1st Omnium, Prova Internacional de Anadia
Grand Prix Galichyna

1st Omnium
2nd Individual Pursuit

UEC U23 European Championships

2nd Individual pursuit
3rd Team pursuit (with Monika Graczewska, Justyna Kaczkowska and Łucja Pietrzak)

Grand Prix of Poland

2nd Team Pursuit (with Monika Graczewska, Justyna Kaczkowska and Łucja Pietrzak)
2nd Omnium

2017
3rd Omnium, Grand Prix Favorit Brno
4th Road race, National Road Championships
2018
3rd Road race, National Road Championships
2019
National Road Championships

3rd Under-23 Time trial
5th Time trial

2020
3rd Omnium, UCI Track World Championships
2021
2nd Road race, National Road Championships
2022
1st Districtenpijl-Ekeren-Deurne
3rd Road race, National Road Championships
5th Road race, UEC European Road Championships
6th Overall Baloise Ladies Tour
2023
1st Tour of Guangxi
1st Konvert Koerse
1st Stage 1 Tour Down Under
1st Stage 4 Bretagne Ladies Tour
1st Stages 1 & 3 Tour Cycliste Féminin International de l'Ardèche
2nd Leiedal Koerse
2nd Omloop der Kempen
3rd Overall Tour of Chongming Island
3rd Veenendaal-Veenendaal Classic
5th Women's Cycling Grand Prix Stuttgart & Region
10th Schwalbe Classic
2024
1st Ronde de Mouscron
1st Argenta Classic-2 Districtenpijl
2nd 2024 Summer Olympics - Women's Omnium
3rd Road race, UEC European Championships
3rd Classic Brugge–De Panne
2025
3rd Vuelta CV Feminas
