= Justyna Kaczkowska =

Polish cyclist (born 1997)

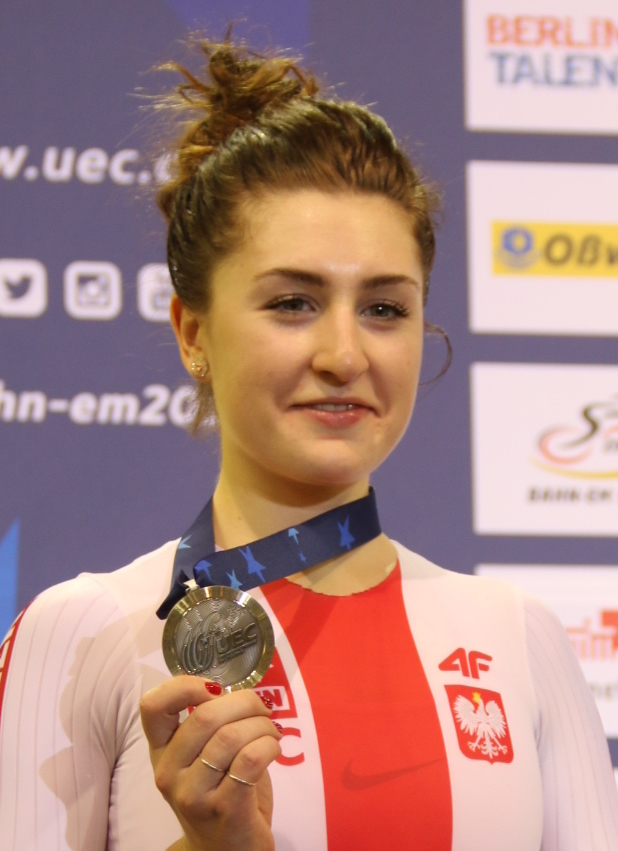
- Justyna Kaczkowska (2017)

Personal information
- Born: 7 October 1997 (age 29) Jaworznik, Poland

Cycling career
- Sport: Cycling
- Discipline: Track
- Role: Rider
Medal record
Representing Poland
Women's track cycling
European Games
Bronze medal – third place	2019 Minsk	Team pursuit
European Championships
Silver medal – second place	2016 Yvelines	Team pursuit
Silver medal – second place	2016 Yvelines	Individual pursuit
Silver medal – second place	2017 Berlin	Individual pursuit
Bronze medal – third place	2017 Berlin	Team pursuit
Bronze medal – third place	2018 Glasgow	Individual pursuit

Justyna Kaczkowska (born 7 October 1997) is a Polish professional racing cyclist. She rode in the women's team pursuit at the 2016 UCI Track Cycling World Championships. and at the 2016 Olympic Games in Rio de Janeiro.

== Career results ==
2016
UEC U23 European Championships

1st Individual Pursuit
3rd Team Pursuit (with Monika Graczewska, Łucja Pietrzak and Daria Pikulik)

GP Czech Cycling Federation

1st Points Race
1st Scratch Race

Prova Internacional de Anadia

1st Scratch Race
3rd Points Race

2nd Team Pursuit, Grand Prix of Poland (with Monika Graczewska, Łucja Pietrzak and Daria Pikulik)
Panevežys

2nd Omnium
3rd Scratch Race

Grand Prix Galichyna

2nd 500m Time Trial
3rd Individual Pursuit

2017
1st Individual Pursuit, UCI Track Cycling World Cup – Round 1, Pruszków
2nd Scratch Race, UCI Track Cycling World Cup – Round 1, Pruszków
2nd Omnium, Grand Prix Favorit Brno
UEC European Track Championships

2nd Individual Pursuit
3rd Team Pursuit
