= Joshua Harrison =

Australian cyclist (born 1995)

Personal information
- Full name: Joshua Harrison
- Born: 15 June 1995 (age 31)

Cycling career
- Sport: Cycling
- Disciplines: Road; Track
- Role: Rider

Amateur teams
- 2015–2016: ILLI Bikes Cycling Team
- 2018: SASI/Callidus Cycling Team

Professional team
- 2018: WSA–Pushbikers

Joshua Harrison (born 15 June 1995) is an Australian racing cyclist, who last rode for UCI Continental team WSA–Pushbikers. He rode for WSA–Pushbikers in the men's team time trial event at the 2018 UCI Road World Championships. In 2015, he finished fourth in the under-23 time trial at the Oceania Cycling Championships.
