= Annette Edmondson =

Australian cyclist (born 1991)

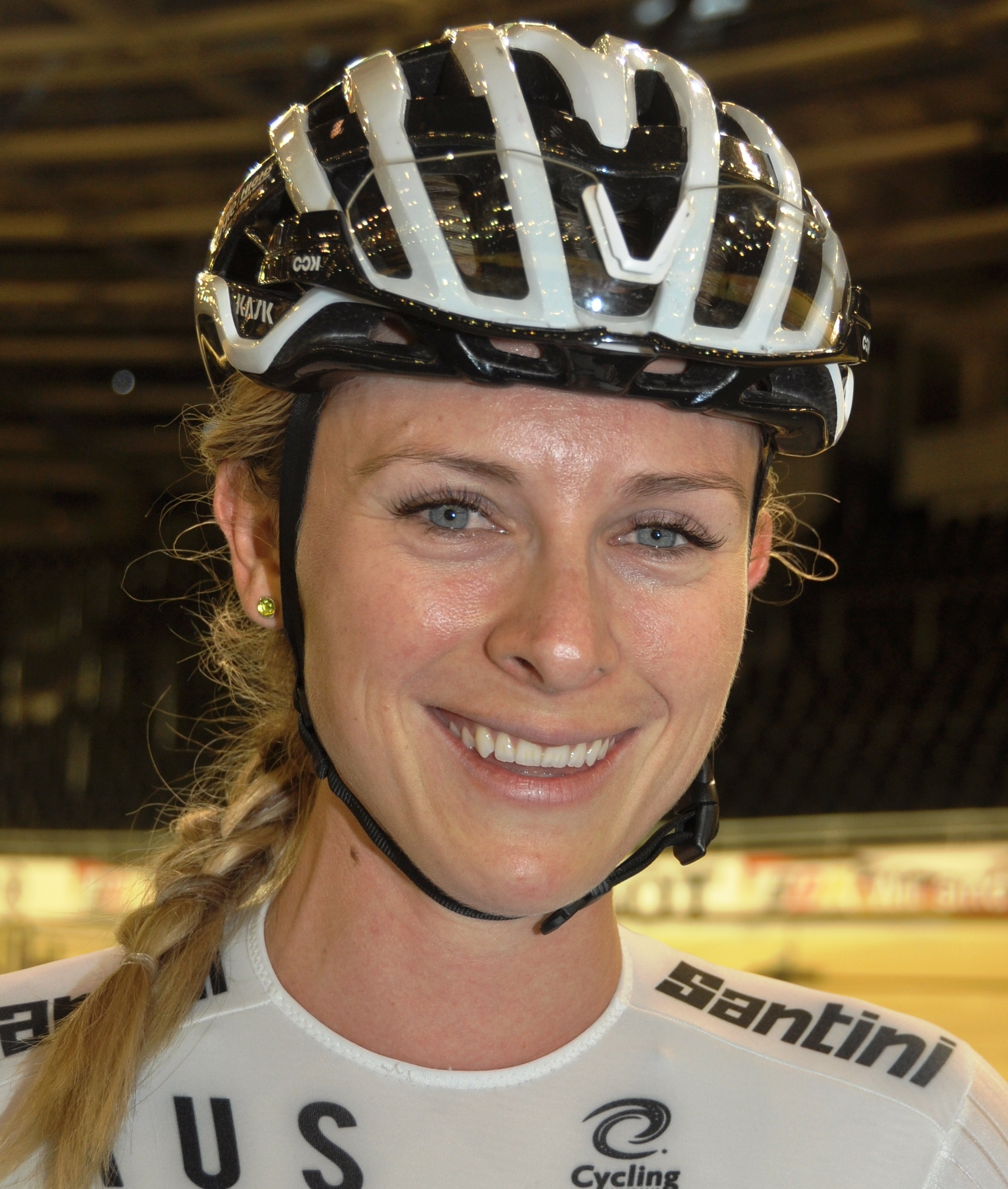
- Edmondson in 2018

Personal information
- Nickname: Nettie
- Born: 12 December 1991 (age 34) Adelaide, Australia
- Height: 1.70 m (5 ft 7 in)
- Weight: 65 kg (143 lb)

Cycling career
- Sport: Cycling
- Current team: Norwood CC
- Disciplines: Track; Road
- Role: Rider
- Rider type: Endurance (Track); Sprinter (Road)

Amateur teams
- 2007–: Norwood CC
- 2011: AIS Women's Track Endurance

Professional teams
- 2012–2013: Team Jayco–AIS
- 2013–2014: Orica–AIS
- 2015–2018: Wiggle–Honda

Major wins
- Tour of Chongming Island (2013); Pajot Hills Classic (2017)
Medal record
Women's track cycling
Representing Australia
Olympic Games
Bronze medal – third place	2012 London	Omnium
World Championships
Gold medal – first place	2015 Yvelines	Team pursuit
Gold medal – first place	2015 Yvelines	Omnium
Gold medal – first place	2019 Pruszków	Team pursuit
Silver medal – second place	2012 Melbourne	Omnium
Silver medal – second place	2012 Melbourne	Team pursuit
Silver medal – second place	2013 Minsk	Team pursuit
Bronze medal – third place	2013 Minsk	Individual pursuit
Bronze medal – third place	2013 Minsk	Omnium
Bronze medal – third place	2014 Cali	Team pursuit
Bronze medal – third place	2014 Cali	Omnium
Commonwealth Games
Gold medal – first place	2014 Glasgow	Scratch
Gold medal – first place	2018 Gold Coast	Team pursuit
Silver medal – second place	2014 Glasgow	Individual pursuit
Bronze medal – third place	2018 Gold Coast	Individual pursuit
Women's road cycling
Representing Orica–AIS
World Championships
Silver medal – second place	2014 Ponferrada	Team time trial
Bronze medal – third place	2013 Tuscany	Team time trial

Annette Edmondson (born 12 December 1991) is an Australian former cyclist who competed on the track with Cycling Australia's High Performance Unit (HPU). She also competed on the road for the Wiggle High5 team between 2015 and 2018.

Her greatest successes were the three gold medals she won at the UCI Track Cycling World Championships in the omnium and team pursuit, a competition in which she also secured further silver medals in the omnium (2012) and team pursuit (2012 and 2013). Edmondson also competed in the London 2012 Olympics, securing a bronze medal for Australia in the women's Omnium and finishing in fourth place in the Team pursuit. At the 2014 Commonwealth Games she claimed a silver in the individual pursuit and a gold in the scratch race, her first gold medal at an international level and her first Commonwealth title. In addition, she has competed at the National Track Championships with gold medal results at an elite level since 2012 in multiple disciplines.

== Early life ==
Edmondson was born in Adelaide, but due to her parents' careers at Royal Dutch Shell, she spent the early part of her childhood living in Malaysia, Oman and the Netherlands. However, when she was six, the family returned to her father's native land of Australia.

She attended the Victor Harbor Primary School, south of Adelaide, South Australia, later moving to St John's Grammar School in the Adelaide Hills where she took up numerous pursuits, including soccer and athletics.

== Career ==
When she was 13, the South Australian Sports Institute visited her school and she was identified as having the physical attributes to have a potential career in cycling. After a year in the Talent Search Program, her first major win came at the 2006 National Junior Track Championships where she won two bronze medals in the Under 17 500m Time Trial and Sprint. From that point, she began to specialise in sprint cycling and as a junior won sprint events at a National and Oceania level.

In 2010, she took part in her first elite level National Championships finishing with silvers in the Team sprint, Keirin and 500m TT as well as a bronze in the Individual sprint.

However, Edmondson began to lose interest in the sport and took a break from cycling. In spite of her doubt, she returned to training just four months later, but she wanted a change and therefore made the switch from sprint to endurance cycling. Eight months later, she had successfully made the switch by becoming the Australian Omnium and Scratch Race champion.

Her first World Championships came in 2012 at the UCI World Championships in Melbourne in which she achieved silver in both the Omnium and Team Pursuit. These results helped her secure a place in the 2012 Australian Olympic Team.

In London, she took part in two events of the Olympic Track Cycling Schedule. In the Team Pursuit, the Australian squad secured 4th place, missing out on the bronze medal. It was her performance in the 6 events of the Omnium resulted in her claiming the bronze medal.

After the Olympics, in 2013, she signed a professional road contract with Orica–AIS, in her first season with the team, she secured a major victory taking 1st overall in the Tour of Chongming Island. Her and teammates took 3rd in the 2013 World Road Race Championships TTT in Florence, Italy.

At the 2014 Commonwealth Games in Glasgow, Edmondson claimed a silver in the Individual Pursuit along with fellow athlete Amy Cure who took a bronze in the event. On the 3rd day of competition (26 July 2014), Edmondson took part in the 10 km Scratch Race, where she raced to victory taking her 1st Commonwealth Games Gold Medal and again fellow athlete Amy Cure also succeeded coming out with a silver medal from the event.

On 22 October 2014, Wiggle–Honda announced that Edmondson had signed with the team for the 2015 season, where she remained until the team disbanded at the end of the 2018 season.

Alongside her road racing, she continued to compete in track cycling. At the 2015 World Championships, she won gold in the omnium and the team pursuit.

At the 2016 Olympics, she competed in the team pursuit (the Australian team finished 5th) and the omnium (finishing in 8th).

She competed at the 2019 World Championships, winning gold in the team pursuit.

Edmondson qualified for the Tokyo 2020 Olympics. She was a member of the Women's pursuit team. The team consisting of Ashlee Ankudinoff, Georgia Baker, Annette Edmondson, Alexandra Manly, Maeve Plouffe finished fifth. She also competed in the omnium and the madison events.

Edmondson retired from competition after the conclusion of the 2021 UCI Track Champions League in December of that year, having finished third in the women's endurance standings.

== Personal life ==
Edmondson has had a number of high-profile relationships with fellow Australian cyclists including Michael Hepburn, Jack Bobridge and Kelland O'Brien

Edmondson has also had an interest in charity work from a young age. Her first recognition of her work came in 2007 in which she became "Make Indigenous Poverty History Youth Ambassador for SA". Since then, she has made personal visits to deprived areas, such as parts of Indonesia to give up her time as volunteer. She is fluent in Indonesian.

Edmondson has two brothers; her younger brother Alex Edmondson is also a professional cyclist.

== Major results ==
=== Track ===
2007
Oceania Junior Track Championships

1st Sprint
1st Team sprint (with Chloe Hosking)
1st Scratch

3rd Keirin, Oceania Track Championships
2008
National Junior Track Championships

1st 500m time trial
1st Sprint
1st Keirin

2nd Sprint, UCI Junior Track World Championships
3rd Team sprint, National Track Championships
2009
National Junior Track Championships

1st Sprint
1st Scratch
1st 500m time trial
2nd Keirin

3rd Keirin, UCI Junior Track World Championships
2010
National Track Championships

2nd Team sprint
2nd Keirin
2nd 500m time trial
3rd Sprint

2011
National Track Championships

1st Omnium
1st Scratch
3rd Team pursuit

2012
National Track Championships

1st Individual pursuit
1st Points race
2nd Scratch

UCI Track Cycling World Championships

2nd Omnium
2nd Team pursuit

3rd Omnium, Olympic Games
2013
Oceania Track Championships

1st Points race
1st Omnium
2nd Team pursuit

National Track Championships

1st Omnium
1st Individual pursuit
1st Points race
1st Scratch

1st 6 Giorni delle Rose Omnium
1st Invercargill Scratch race
UCI Track Cycling World Championships

2nd Team pursuit
3rd Individual pursuit
3rd Omnium

2014
Oceania Track Championships

1st Individual pursuit
1st Omnium

Commonwealth Games

1st Scratch
2nd Individual pursuit

National Track Championships

1st Scratch
1st Points race
1st Omnium
1st Madison (with Jessica Mundy)
2nd Individual pursuit
3rd Team pursuit

UCI Track Cycling World Championships

3rd Omnium
3rd Team pursuit

2015
UCI Track Cycling World Championships

1st Omnium
1st Team pursuit

1st Omnium, Oceania Track Championships
1st Omnium, South Australian Grand Prix
1st Omnium, Super Drome Cup
1st Madison, Austral (with Julie Leth)
National Track Championships

1st Madison (with Jessica Mundy)
2nd Individual pursuit
2nd Team pursuit

2016
Oceania Track Championships

1st Team pursuit (with Ashlee Ankudinoff, Amy Cure and Alexandra Manly)
1st Madison (with Amy Cure)

National Track Championships

1st Scratch
1st Points race

2018
Commonwealth Games

1st Team pursuit (with Ashlee Ankudinoff, Amy Cure and Alexandra Manly)
3rd Individual pursuit

National Track Championships

1st Team pursuit (with Breanna Hargrave, Alexandra Manly, and Maeve Plouffe)
2nd Madison (with Alexandra Manly)

2019
1st Team pursuit, UCI Track Cycling World Championships
2021
3rd Endurance classification UCI Track Cycling Champions League

=== Road ===
2011
8th Road race, Oceania Road Championships
2012
National Road Championships

2nd Under-23 criterium
3rd Criterium

8th Road race, Oceania Road Championships
2013
1st Overall Tour of Chongming Island

1st Stage 3

1st Stage 4 Belgium Tour
3rd Team time trial, UCI Road World Championships
9th Dwars door de Westhoek
2014
1st Points classification Adelaide Tour
2nd Team time trial, UCI Road World Championships
2015
1st Sprints classification Women's Tour Down Under
4th RideLondon Grand Prix
7th Overall BeNe Ladies Tour
2016
1st Stage 2 Women's Tour Down Under
2017
1st Pajot Hills Classic
3rd Overall BeNe Ladies Tour

1st Prologue

10th Overall Tour of Chongming Island
2018
1st Towards Zero Race Melbourne
1st Stage 1 Women's Tour Down Under
2019
4th Dwars door de Westhoek
2021
National Road Championships

1st Criterium
