= Saartje Vandenbroucke =

Belgian cyclist

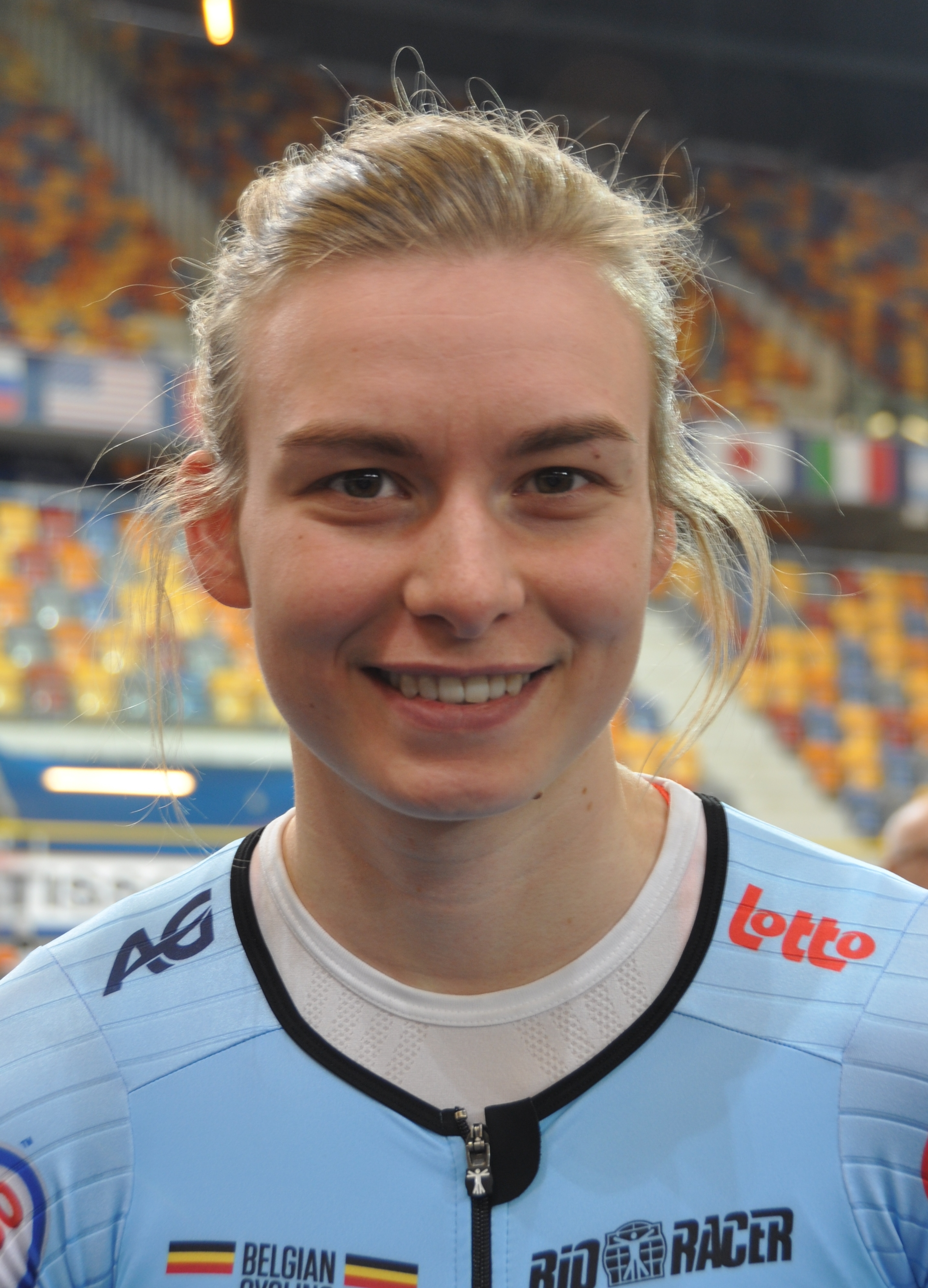
- Vandenbroucke in 2018.

Personal information
- Full name: Saartje Vandenbroucke
- Born: 13 February 1996 (age 30) Hollebeke, Ypres, Belgium

Cycling career
- Sport: Cycling
- Current team: S-Bikes–AGU
- Disciplines: Road; Track
- Role: Rider

Amateur teams
- 2014: Topsport Vlaanderen–Pro-Duo (stagiaire)
- 2020–: S-Bikes–AGU

Professional teams
- 2015–2016: Topsport Vlaanderen–Pro-Duo
- 2017–2019: Lares–Waowdeals

Saartje Vandenbroucke (born 13 February 1996) is a Belgian racing cyclist, who currently rides for Belgian amateur team S-Bikes–AGU.

== See also ==
- List of 2015 UCI Women's Teams and riders
