= Shannon McCurley =

Irish cyclist

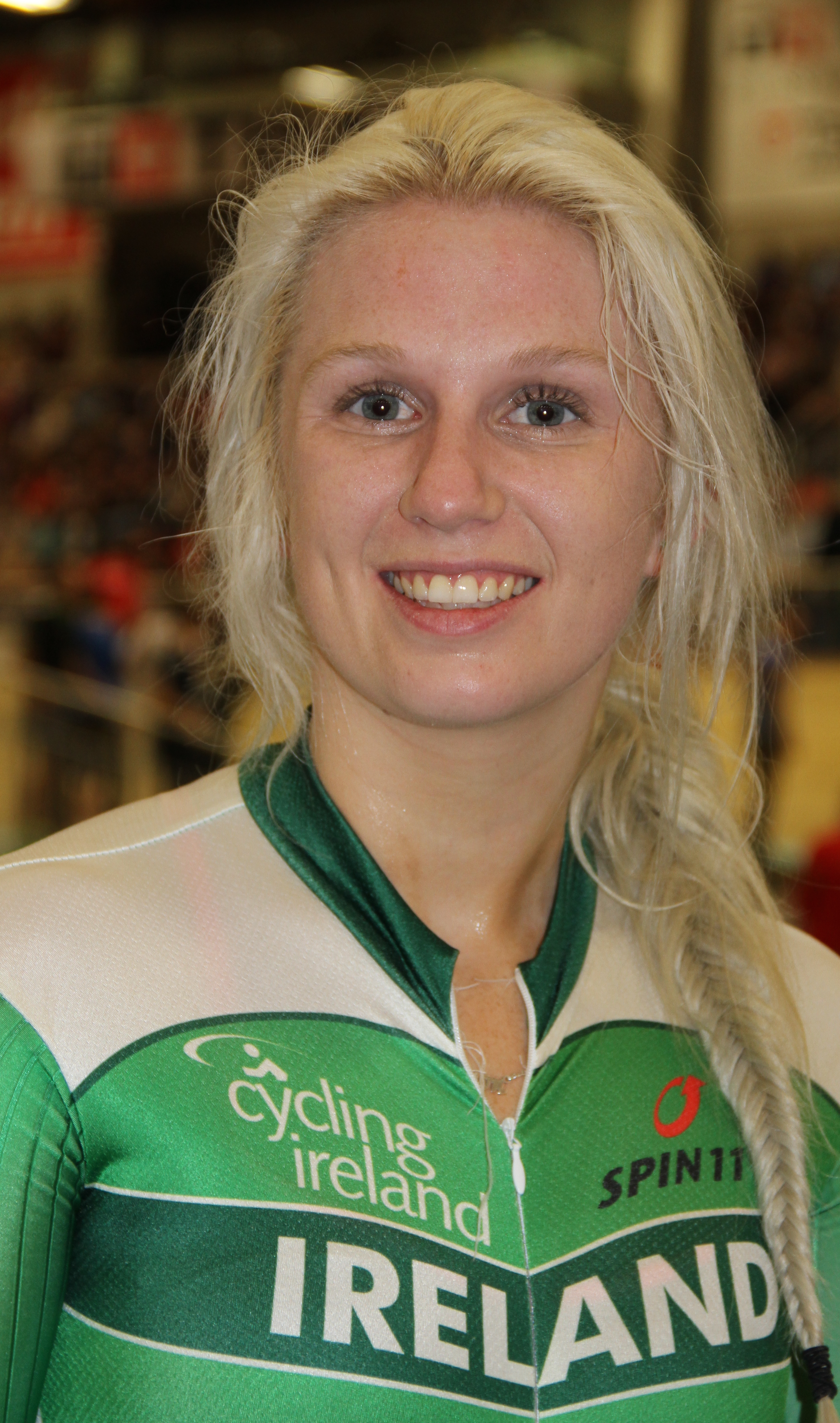
- McCurley at the UEC European Track Championships on 16 October 2015

Personal information
- Born: 26 April 1992 (age 34) Melbourne, Victoria, Australia

Cycling career
- Sport: Cycling
- Discipline: Track cycling
- Role: Rider
- Rider type: scratch and keirin
Medal record
European Championships
Silver medal – second place	2019 Apeldoorn	Scratch

Shannon McCurley (born 26 April 1992) is an Australian-born Irish female track cyclist, who became the first Irish female to qualify for an Olympic track cycling event.

== Background ==
McCurley was born in Melbourne. Her father was from Belfast, and her mother from Dublin, so she had the potential to participate in sport for three countries, United Kingdom, Republic of Ireland and Australia. She first visited Ireland in 2012.

== Career ==
McCurley began her sports career with running but switched to cycling after some injuries and a brief try at triathlon.

McCurley trains primarily in Melbourne, where she's based. She also trains with the Irish track cycling team in Majorca. Her coach is John Beasley.

She won the bronze medal in the under-23 scratch event at the 2011 European Track Championships (under-23 & junior). She competed in the scratch event at the 2012 UCI Track Cycling World Championships.

After some injuries, McCurley switched her focus to keirin racing in 2014 to avoid quick-start sprints and to attempt to qualify for the 2016 Summer Olympics in Rio de Janeiro. She was successful and, thus, became the first Irish female to qualify for an Olympic track cycling event.

== Career results ==
2011
3rd Scratch Race, UEC European U23 Track Championships
2014
Irish International Track GP

1st Scratch Race
2nd Keirin

3rd Scratch Race, BikeNZ Cup
2015
South East Asian GP Track

2nd Keirin
2nd Keirin
3rd Sprint
