= Łucja Pietrzak =

Polish cyclist (born 1995)

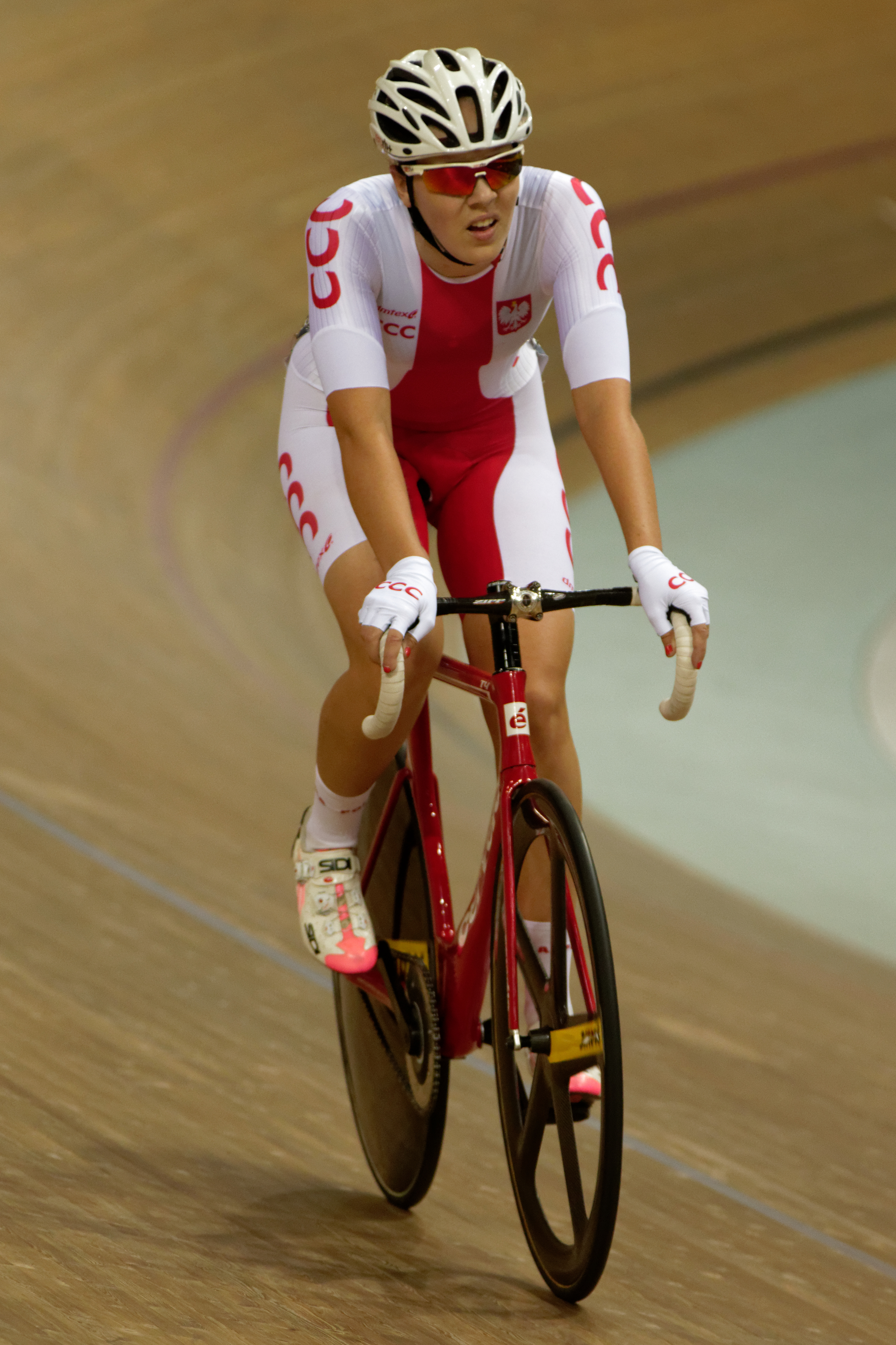
- Łucja Pietrzak (2016)

Personal information
- Born: 27 December 1995 (age 30)

Cycling career
- Sport: Cycling
- Discipline: Track cycling
Medal record
Women's track cycling
Representing Poland
European Championships
Silver medal – second place	2016 Yvelines	Team pursuit

Łucja Pietrzak (born 27 December 1995) is a Polish track cyclist, representing Poland at international competitions. She won the silver medal at the 2016 UEC European Track Championships in the team pursuit, but only participated in the qualifying round and semi-final.

== Career results ==
2014
1st Scratch Race, International Track Women & Men (U23)
2015
1st Scratch Race, Grand Prix Minsk
6 giorni delle rose - Fiorenzuola (U23)

1st Scratch Race
3rd Points Race

2016
2nd Team Pursuit, Grand Prix of Poland (with Monika Graczewska, Justyna Kaczkowska and Daria Pikulik)
3rd Omnium, Panevežys
3rd Team Pursuit, UEC U23 European Championships (with Monika Graczewska, Justyna Kaczkowska and Daria Pikulik)
