= Emily Nelson =

British cyclist (born 1996)

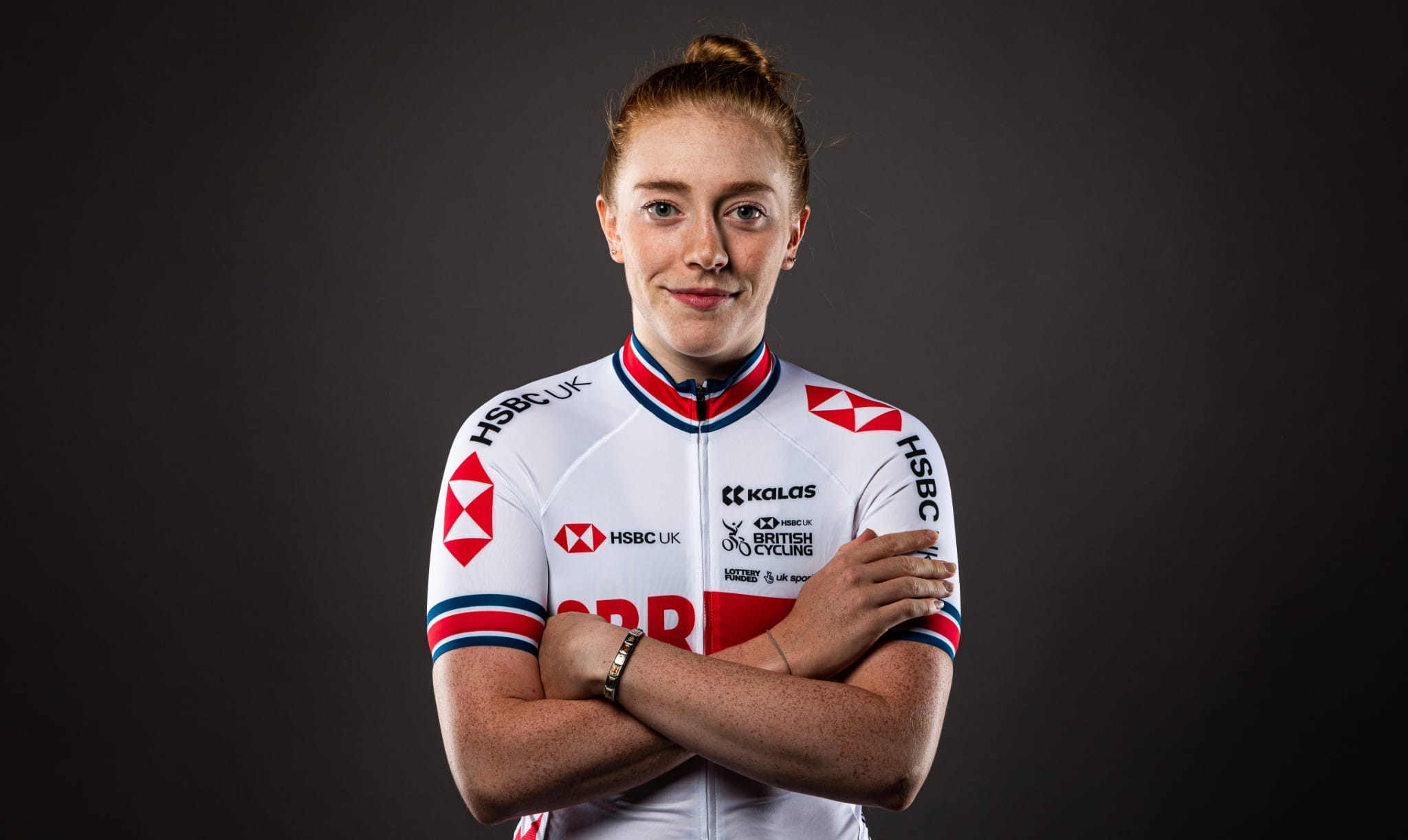
- Nelson in 2019

Personal information
- Born: 10 November 1996 (age 29) Burton upon Trent, Staffordshire, England

Cycling career
- Sport: Cycling
- Discipline: Track
- Role: Rider

Amateur team
- Lichfield City Cycling Team
Medal record
World Championships
Gold medal – first place	2018 Apeldoorn	Madison
Silver medal – second place	2017 Hong Kong	Madison
Silver medal – second place	2018 Apeldoorn	Team pursuit
European Championships
Gold medal – first place	2019 Apeldoorn	Scratch
Silver medal – second place	2016 Yvelines	Madison
Silver medal – second place	2019 Apeldoorn	Elimination race
Bronze medal – third place	2016 Yvelines	Team pursuit

Emily Nelson (born 10 November 1996) is a former English professional racing cyclist. Her sister, Josie, is also a cyclist and joined Trinity Racing for the 2021 season.

== Career ==
On 8 August 2013, at the Sir Chris Hoy Velodrome in Glasgow, Nelson competed at the UCI Juniors Track World Championships. She was part of Britain's Team Pursuit squad which also included Hayley Jones, Amy Hill and Emily Kay. In the qualifying heat, they broke the senior world record which had only been set a few weeks previously at the European Track Championships, setting a new time of 4:38.708. In the final, they broke the record once more, with a time of 4:35.085, beating Russia to become world champions.

On the road in 2017, Nelson won the third round of the Matrix Fitness Grand Prix Series in Northwich. Nelson followed this up by finishing second at the Lincoln Grand Prix which was part of the National Women's Road Series.

== Major results ==
2013
1st Team pursuit, UCI Junior Track World Championships
2014
1st Team pursuit, UEC European Junior Track Championships
2015
Revolution

1st Scratch Race - Round 2 - Manchester
1st Scratch Race - Round 4 – Glasgow
2nd Scratch Race - Round 3, London

2016
UCI Track World Cup

1st Team pursuit (Glasgow)
2nd Team pursuit (Hong Kong)
3rd Points race

UEC European Track Championships

2nd Madison race (with Emily Kay)
3rd Team pursuit

UEC European Under–23 Track Championships

1st Team pursuit
2nd Points race

Revolution

1st Points race - Round 2, Glasgow
2nd Points race - Round 6, Manchester
2nd Scratch race - Round 2, Glasgow
3rd Scratch race - Round 6, Manchester

Revolution Champions League

1st Points race - Round 1, Manchester
2nd Omnium - Round 1, Manchester

2017
6 Giorni delle Rose - Fiorenzuola

1st Madison (with Katie Archibald)
2nd Points Race
2nd Scratch Race

National Track Championships

1st Team pursuit
2nd Individual pursuit
2nd Points race
3rd Omnium

2nd Madison race, UCI Track World Championships (with Elinor Barker)
UCI Track World Cup

2nd Madison, Round 1, Pruszków (with Elinor Barker)
3rd Team Pursuit, Round 1, Pruszków (with Neah Evans, Emily Kay and Manon Lloyd)

3rd Overall Six Days of London

1st Madison (with Neah Evans)
3rd Scratch Race

3rd Points Race, Revolution Series – Champions League – Round 2, Glasgow
2019
UEC European Track Championships

1st Scratch race
2nd Elimination race
