= Manon Lloyd =

British cyclist (born 1996)

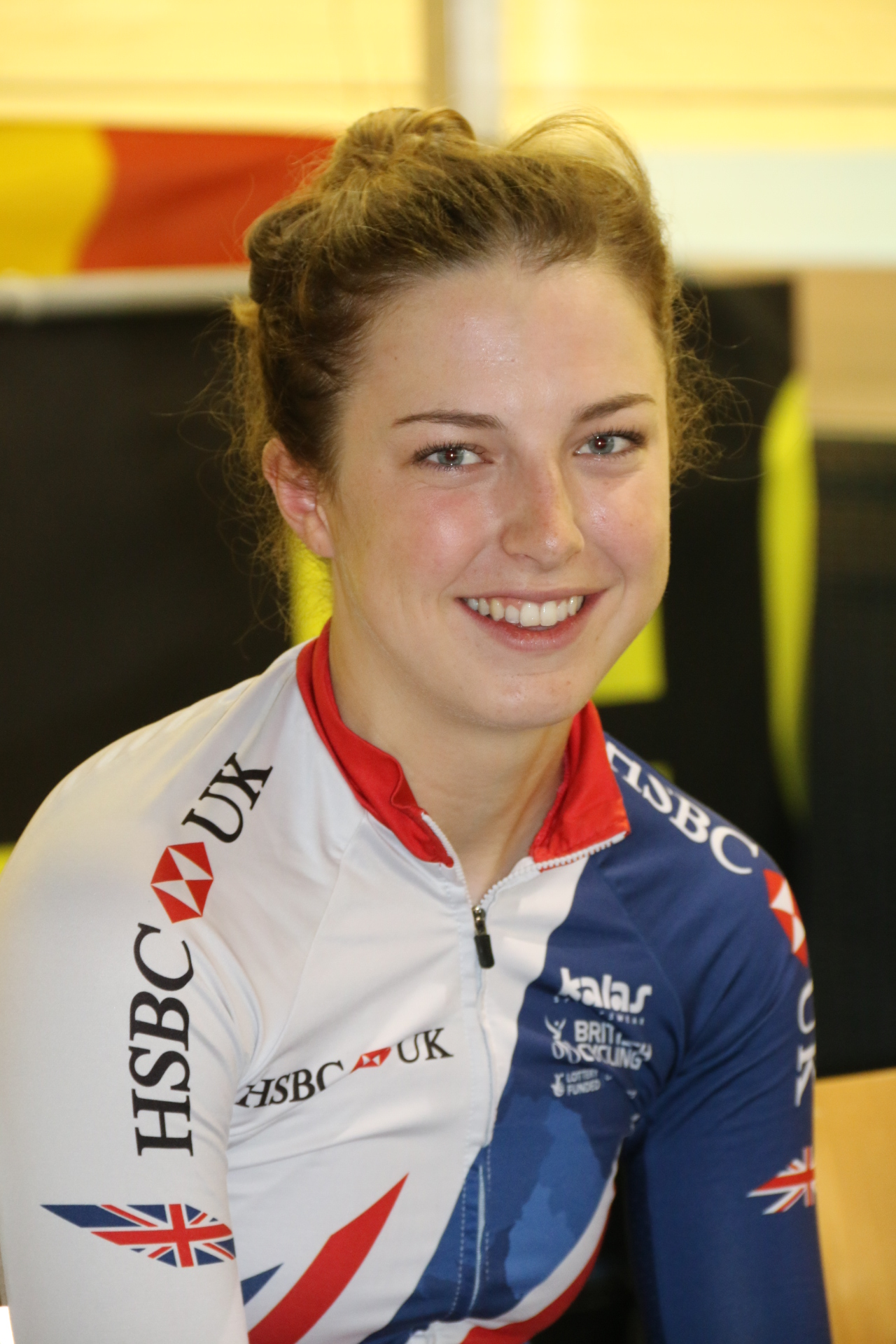
- Lloyd in 2017

Personal information
- Full name: Manon Haf Lloyd
- Born: 5 November 1996 (age 29) Carmarthen, Wales

Cycling career
- Sport: Cycling
- Disciplines: Road; Track
- Role: Rider

Amateur team
- 2016–2017: Team Breeze

Professional team
- 2018–2019: Trek–Drops
Medal record
Women's track cycling
Representing Great Britain
European Championships
Bronze medal – third place	2016 Yvelines	Team pursuit

Manon Haf Lloyd (born 5 November 1996) is a Welsh presenter and former road and track cyclist. She rode professionally for UCI Women's Team Drops in 2018 and 2019. Representing Great Britain at international competitions, she won the bronze medal at the 2016 UEC European Track Championships in the team pursuit. She finished third in the individual competition at the 2017 Matrix Fitness Grand Prix.

In 2019, Lloyd joined the Global Cycling Network YouTube channel as a presenter, and departed GCN on July 30, 2024. Since July 2025 she has presented the Watts Occurring Femmes podcast alongside Emma Finucane.

== Biography ==
Lloyd is the elder of two children, raised on her family's sheep farm near Kidwelly. She attended Ysgol y Fro in the nearby village of Llangyndeyrn. Having enjoyed swimming and running as a child, she wanted to try triathlon. She joined her local club, Towy Riders, taking up cycling around the age of 14, at Carmarthen Park velodrome.

== Major results ==
2014
UEC European Junior Track Championships

1st Team pursuit
1st Points race

2016
UCI Track World Cup

1st Madison (Glasgow)
1st Team pursuit (Glasgow)

1st Team pursuit, UEC European Under-23 Track Championships
3rd Team pursuit, UEC European Track Championships
2017
UEC European Under-23 Track Championships

1st Madison (with Ellie Dickinson)
3rd Points race

1st Team pursuit, National Track Championships
Track Cycling Challenge

1st Madison (with Emily Kay)
2nd Scratch race

2nd Team pursuit, UEC European Track Championships
3rd Team pursuit, Round 1 (Pruszków), Track Cycling World Cup (with Neah Evans, Emily Kay and Emily Nelson)
