= 2010 Thüringen Rundfahrt der Frauen =

Race details
- Dates: 20–25 July 2010
- Stages: 6
- Distance: 615 km (382 mi)
- Winning time: 16h 54m 22s

Results
	Winner	Olga Zabelinskaya (RUS)	(Safi-Pasta Zara)
	Second	Edita Pučinskaitė (LTU)	(Gauss RDZ ORMU)
	Third	Noemi Cantele (ITA)	(Team HTC–Columbia Women)

The 2010 Thüringen Rundfahrt der Frauen was the 23rd edition of the Thüringen Rundfahrt der Frauen, a women's cycling stage race in Germany. It was part of the 2010 women's road cycling season. It was rated by the Union Cycliste Internationale as a category 2.1 race and was held between 20 and 25 July 2010.

== Stages ==
=== Stage 1 ===
20 July – Altenburg to Altenburg, 87.6 km (54.4 mi)

Stage 1 Result
Rank	Rider	Team	Time
1	Emma Johansson (SWE)	Red Sun Cycling Team	2h 14m 59s
2	Elena Kuchinskaya-Andreeva (RUS)	Gauss RDZ ORMU	+2s
3	Noemi Cantele (ITA)	Team HTC–Columbia Women	s.t.
4	Olga Zabelinskaya (RUS)	Safi-Pasta Zara	+3s
5	Hanka Kupfernagel (GER)	Germany national team	s.t.
6	Lisa Brennauer (GER)	Germany national team	+7s
7	Sarah Düster (GER)	Cervélo Test Team	+12s
8	Janneke Busser Kanis (NED)	Netherlands national team	+35s
9	Adrie Visser (NED)	Team HTC–Columbia Women	+1m 31s
10	Charlotte Becker (GER)	Cervélo Test Team	s.t.

General Classification after Stage 1
Rank	Rider	Team	Time
1	Emma Johansson (SWE)	Red Sun Cycling Team	2h 14m 49s
2	Elena Kuchinskaya (RUS)	Gauss RDZ ORMU	+6s
3	Noemi Cantele (ITA)	Team HTC–Columbia Women	+8s
4	Hanka Kupfernagel (GER)	Germany national team	+8s
5	Olga Zabelinskaya (RUS)	Safi-Pasta Zara	+11s
6	Lisa Brennauer (GER)	Germany national team	+17s
7	Sarah Düster (GER)	Cervélo Test Team	+17s
8	Janneke Kanis (NED)	Netherlands national team	+45s
9	Adrie Visser (NED)	Team HTC–Columbia Women	+1m 41s
10	Charlotte Becker (GER)	Cervélo Test Team	+1m 41s

=== Stage 2 ===
21 July – Gera to Gera, 132 km (82.0 mi)

Stage 2 Result

Result
Rank	Rider	Team	Time
1	Edita Pučinskaitė (LTU)	Gauss RDZ ORMU	3h 31m 48s
2	Olga Zabelinskaya (RUS)	Safi-Pasta Zara	+2s
3	Charlotte Becker (GER)	Cervélo Test Team	+1m 03s
4	Marta Bastianelli (ITA)	Fenixs-Petrogradets	+1m 21s
5	Elena Kuchinskaya (RUS)	Gauss RDZ ORMU	+1m 22s
6	Irene van den Broek (NED)	Netherlands national team	s.t.
7	Noemi Cantele (ITA)	Team HTC–Columbia Women	s.t.
8	Adrie Visser (NED)	Team HTC–Columbia Women	+7m 36s
9	Yuliya Martisova (RUS)	Gauss RDZ ORMU	s.t.
10	Hanka Kupfernagel (GER)	Germany national team	s.t.

General Classification after Stage 2

Result
Rank	Rider	Team	Time
1	Olga Zabelinskaya (RUS)	Safi-Pasta Zara	5h 46m 42s
2	Elena Kuchinskaya (RUS)	Gauss RDZ ORMU	+1m 18s
3	Noemi Cantele (ITA)	Team HTC–Columbia Women	+1m 25s
4	Edita Pučinskaitė (LTU)	Gauss RDZ ORMU	+1m 32s
5	Charlotte Becker (GER)	Cervélo Test Team	+2m 32s
6	Irene van den Broek (NED)	Netherlands national team	+2m 58s
7	Marta Bastianelli (ITA)	Fenixs-Petrogradets	+s.t.
8	Hanka Kupfernagel (GER)	Germany national team	+7m 36s
9	Sarah Düster (GER)	Cervélo Test Team	+7m 46s
10	Lisa Brennauer (GER)	Germany national team	+8m 00s

=== Stage 3 ===
22 July – Greiz to Greiz, 128.7 km (80.0 mi)

Stage 3 Result

Result
Rank	Rider	Team	Time
1	Adrie Visser (NED)	Team HTC–Columbia Women	3h 37m 46s
2	Iris Slappendel (NED)	Cervélo Test Team	s.t.
3	Marta Bastianelli (ITA)	Fenixs-Petrogradets	s.t.
4	Olga Zabelinskaya (RUS)	Safi-Pasta Zara	+1m 30s
5	Yuliya Martisova (RUS)	Gauss RDZ ORMU	s.t.
6	Edita Pučinskaitė (LTU)	Gauss RDZ ORMU	s.t.
7	Andrea Bosman (NED)	Netherlands national team	s.t.
8	Petra Dijkman (NED)	Red Sun Cycling Team	+3s
9	Elena Kuchinskaya-Andreeva (RUS)	Gauss RDZ ORMU	s.t.
10	Irene van den Broek (NED)	Netherlands national team	s.t.

General Classification after Stage 3

Result
Rank	Rider	Team	Time
1	Olga Zabelinskaya (RUS)	Safi-Pasta Zara	9h 24m 27s
2	Elena Kuchinskaya (RUS)	Gauss RDZ ORMU	+1m 22s
3	Noemi Cantele (ITA)	Team HTC–Columbia Women	+1m 30s
4	Edita Pučinskaitė (LTU)	Gauss RDZ ORMU	+1m 33s
5	Marta Bastianelli (ITA)	Fenixs-Petrogradets	+2m 54s
6	Irene van den Broek (NED)	Netherlands national team	+3m 02s
7	Charlotte Becker (GER)	Cervélo Test Team	+6m 19s
8	Adrie Visser (NED)	Team HTC–Columbia Women	+9m 00s
9	Yuliya Martisova (RUS)	Gauss RDZ ORMU	+9m 09s
10	Iris Slappendel (NED)	Cervélo Test Team	+9m 20s

=== Stage 4 ===
23 July – Schleiz to Schleiz, 23.3 km (14.5 mi) (Individual time trial)

Stage 4 Result

Result
Rank	Rider	Team	Time
1	Hanka Kupfernagel (GER)	Germany national team	32m 27s
2	Regina Bruins (NED)	Cervélo Test Team	+10s
3	Olga Zabelinskaya (RUS)	Safi-Pasta Zara	+26s
4	Hanna Solovey (UKR)	Ukraine national team	+27s
5	Trixi Worrack (GER)	Nurnberger Versichering	+34s
6	Irene van den Broek (NED)	Netherlands national team	+1m 01s
7	Sarah Düster (GER)	Cervélo Test Team	+1m 03s
8	Ellen van Dijk (NED)	Team HTC–Columbia Women	+1m 04s
9	Lisa Brennauer (GER)	Germany national team	+1m 09s
10	Latoya Brulee (BEL)	Red Sun Cycling Team	+1m 12s

General Classification after Stage 4

Result
Rank	Rider	Team	Time

=== Stage 5 ===
24 July – Schmölln to Schmölln, 115.8 km (72.0 mi)

Stage 5 Result

Result
Rank	Rider	Team	Time
1	Sarah Düster (GER)	Cervélo Test Team	3h 02m 14s
2	Hanka Kupfernagel (GER)	Germany national team	s.t.
3	Adrie Visser (NED)	Team HTC–Columbia Women	s.t.
4	Trixi Worrack (GER)	Nurnberger Versichering	s.t.
5	Andrea Bosman (NED)	Netherlands national team	+1s
6	Vera Koedooder (NED)	Netherlands national team	+2s
7	Petra Dijkman (NED)	Red Sun Cycling Team	s.t.
8	Yuliya Martisova (RUS)	Gauss RDZ ORMU	+12s
9	Luise Keller (GER)	Team HTC–Columbia Women	+25s
10	Elke Gebhardt (GER)	Nurnberger Versichering	+52s

General Classification after Stage 5

Result
Rank	Rider	Team	Time
1	Olga Zabelinskaya (RUS)	Safi-Pasta Zara	13h 01m 30s
2	Edita Pučinskaitė (LTU)	Gauss RDZ ORMU	+2m 56s
3	Noemi Cantele (ITA)	Team HTC–Columbia Women	+3m 02s
4	Irene van den Broek (NED)	Netherlands national team	+3m 38s
5	Elena Kuchinskaya (RUS)	Gauss RDZ ORMU	+3m 53s
6	Marta Bastianelli (ITA)	Fenixs-Petrogradets	+7m 19s
7	Trixi Worrack (GER)	Nurnberger Versichering	+7m 46s
8	Adrie Visser (NED)	Team HTC–Columbia Women	+9m 08s
9	Petra Dijkman (NED)	Red Sun Cycling Team	+9m 39s
10	Yuliya Martisova (RUS)	Gauss RDZ ORMU	+10m 01s

=== Stage 6 ===
25 July – Schmölln to Schmölln, 134.5 km (83.6 mi)

Stage 6 Result

Result
Rank	Rider	Team	Time
1	Iris Slappendel (NED)	Cervélo Test Team	3h 50m 26s
2	Trixi Worrack (GER)	Nurnberger Versichering	+1m 34s
3	Andrea Bosman (NED)	Netherlands national team	s.t.
4	Hanka Kupfernagel (GER)	Germany national team	+1m 36s
5	Petra Dijkman (NED)	Red Sun Cycling Team	s.t.
6	Lisa Brennauer (GER)	Germany national team	s.t.
7	Luise Keller (GER)	Team HTC–Columbia Women	+1m 43s
8	Valentina Bastianelli (ITA)	Fenixs-Petrogradets	+2m 26s
9	Adrie Visser (NED)	Team HTC–Columbia Women	s.t.
10	Vera Koedooder (NED)	Netherlands national team	s.t.

General Classification after Stage 6

Result
Rank	Rider	Team	Time
1	Olga Zabelinskaya (RUS)	Safi-Pasta Zara	16h 54m 22s
2	Edita Pučinskaitė (LTU)	Gauss RDZ ORMU	+2m 56s
3	Noemi Cantele (ITA)	Team HTC–Columbia Women	+3m 02s
4	Irene van den Broek (NED)	Netherlands national team	+3m 38s
5	Elena Kuchinskaya-Andreeva (RUS)	Gauss RDZ ORMU	+3m 53s
6	Trixi Worrack (GER)	Nurnberger Versichering	+6m 48s
7	André Bastianelli (FRA)	Fenixs-Petrogradets	+7m 19s
8	Iris Slappendel (NED)	Cervélo Test Team	+7m 48s
9	Petra Dijkman (NED)	Red Sun Cycling Team	+8m 49s
10	Adrie Visser (NED)	Team HTC–Columbia Women	+9m 08s

== Final classification ==
Result
Rank	Rider	Team	Time
1	Olga Zabelinskaya (RUS)	Safi-Pasta Zara	16h 54m 22s
2	Edita Pučinskaitė (LTU)	Gauss RDZ ORMU	+2m 56s
3	Noemi Cantele (ITA)	Team HTC–Columbia Women	+3m 02s
4	Irene van den Broek (NED)	Netherlands national team	+3m 38s
5	Elena Kuchinskaya-Andreeva (RUS)	Gauss RDZ ORMU	+3m 53s
6	Trixi Worrack (GER)	Nurnberger Versichering	+6m 48s
7	André Bastianelli (FRA)	Fenixs-Petrogradets	+7m 19s
8	Iris Slappendel (NED)	Cervélo Test Team	+7m 48s
9	Petra Dijkman (NED)	Red Sun Cycling Team	+8m 49s
10	Adrie Visser (NED)	Team HTC–Columbia Women	+9m 08s

== See also ==
- 2010 in women's road cycling
