= 2010 Tour of Chongming Island Stage race =

Race details
- Dates: 5–7 May 2010
- Stages: 3
- Winning time: 5h 40' 43"

Results
Jersey awarded to the overall winner	Winner	Ina-Yoko Teutenberg (GER)	(Team HTC–Columbia Women)
	Second	Kirsten Wild (NED)	(Cervelo TestTeam)
	Third	Rochelle Gilmore (AUS)	(Australia national team)

The 2010 Tour of Chongming Island Stage race was the fourth women's edition of the Tour of Chongming Island cycling stage race. It was rated by the UCI as category 2.1, and was held between 5 and 7 May 2010, in China.

== Stages ==
=== Stage 1 ===
5 May – Chongbai to Chongbai, 72.5 km (45.0 mi)

Stage 1 Result

Result
Rank	Rider	Team	Time
1	Ina-Yoko Teutenberg (GER)	Team HTC–Columbia Women	1h 43m 47s
2	Kirsten Wild (NED)	Cervelo TestTeam	s.t.
3	Hye Keong Choi (KOR)	South Korea national team	s.t.
4	Rochelle Gilmore (AUS)	Australia national team	s.t.
5	Angela Hennig (GER)	Noris Cycling	s.t.
6	Marta Tagliaferro (ITA)	Top Girls Fassa Bortolo-Ghezzi	s.t.
7	Aurore Verhoeven (FRA)	Esgl 93-Gsd Gestion	s.t.
8	Vicki Whitelaw (AUS)	Australia national team	s.t.
9	Vilija Sereikaitė (LTU)	Lithuania national team	s.t.
10	Cath Cheatley (NZL)	New Zealand national team	s.t.

General Classification after Stage 1

Result
Rank	Rider	Team	Time
1	Ina-Yoko Teutenberg (GER)	Team HTC–Columbia Women	1h 43m 31s
2	Kirsten Wild (NED)	Cervelo TestTeam	+ 6s
3	Hye Keong Choi (KOR)	South Korea national team	+ 12s
4	Rochelle Gilmore (AUS)	Australia national team	+ 14s
5	Angela Hennig (GER)	Noris Cycling	+ 16s
6	Marta Tagliaferro (ITA)	Top Girls Fassa Bortolo-Ghezzi	s.t.
7	Aurore Verhoeven (FRA)	Esgl 93-Gsd Gestion	s.t.
8	Vicki Whitelaw (AUS)	Australia national team	s.t.
9	Vilija Sereikaitė (LTU)	Lithuania national team	s.t.
10	Cath Cheatley (NZL)	New Zealand national team	s.t.

=== Stage 2 ===
6 May – 79.8 km (49.6 mi)

Stage 2 Result

Result
Rank	Rider	Team	Time
1	Kirsten Wild (NED)	Cervelo TestTeam	2h 03m 39s
2	Ina-Yoko Teutenberg (GER)	Team HTC–Columbia Women	s.t.
3	Rochelle Gilmore (AUS)	Australia national team	s.t.
4	Marta Tagliaferro (ITA)	Top Girls Fassa Bortolo-Ghezzi	s.t.
5	Angela Hennig (GER)	Noris Cycling	s.t.
6	Alessandra D'Ettore (ITA)	Top Girls Fassa Bortolo-Ghezzi	s.t.
7	Ellen van Dijk (NED)	Team HTC–Columbia Women	s.t.
8	Vilija Sereikaitė (LTU)	Lithuania national team	s.t.
9	Trixi Worrack (GER)	Noris Cycling	s.t.
10	Aurore Verhoeven (FRA)	Esgl 93-Gsd Gestion	s.t.

General Classification after Stage 2

Result
Rank	Rider	Team	Time
1	Kirsten Wild (NED)	Cervelo TestTeam	3h 47m 01s
2	Ina-Yoko Teutenberg (GER)	Team HTC–Columbia Women	+ 0s
3	Rochelle Gilmore (AUS)	Australia national team	+ 18s
4	Hye Keong Choi (KOR)	South Korea national team	+ 21s
5	Marta Tagliaferro (ITA)	Top Girls Fassa Bortolo-Ghezzi	+ 25s
6	Angela Hennig (GER)	Noris Cycling	s.t.
7	Vilija Sereikaitė (LTU)	Lithuania national team	s.t.
8	Aurore Verhoeven (FRA)	Esgl 93-Gsd Gestion	s.t.
9	Edita Janeliūnaitė (LTU)	Lithuania national team	s.t.
10	Lieselot Decroix (BEL)	Cervelo TestTeam	s.t.

=== Stage 3 ===
7 May – Chongming to Chongming, 79.2 km (49.2 mi)

Stage 3 Result

Result
Rank	Rider	Team	Time
1	Ina-Yoko Teutenberg (GER)	Team HTC–Columbia Women	1h 53m 57s
2	Kirsten Wild (NED)	Cervelo TestTeam	s.t.
3	Rochelle Gilmore (AUS)	Australia national team	s.t.
4	Marta Tagliaferro (ITA)	Top Girls Fassa Bortolo-Ghezzi	s.t.
5	Alessandra D'Ettore (ITA)	Top Girls Fassa Bortolo-Ghezzi	s.t.
6	Angela Hennig (GER)	Noris Cycling	s.t.
7	Charlotte Becker (GER)	Cervelo TestTeam	s.t.
8	Vilija Sereikaitė (LTU)	Lithuania national team	+ 02s
9	Edita Janeliūnaitė (LTU)	Lithuania national team	s.t.
10	Cath Cheatley (NZL)	New Zealand national team	s.t.

General Classification after Stage 3

Result
Rank	Rider	Team	Time
1	Ina-Yoko Teutenberg (GER)	Team HTC–Columbia Women	5h 40m 43s
2	Kirsten Wild (NED)	Cervelo TestTeam	+ 04s
3	Rochelle Gilmore (AUS)	Australia national team	+ 27s
4	Charlotte Becker (GER)	Cervelo TestTeam	+ 35s
5	Hye Keong Choi (KOR)	South Korea national team	+ 38s
6	Marta Tagliaferro (ITA)	Top Girls Fassa Bortolo-Ghezzi	+ 39s
7	Angela Hennig (GER)	Noris Cycling	+ 40s
8	Alessandra D'Ettore (ITA)	Top Girls Fassa Bortolo-Ghezzi	s.t.
9	Vilija Sereikaitė (LTU)	Lithuania national team	+ 42s
10	Aurore Verhoeven (FRA)	Esgl 93-Gsd Gestion	s.t.

== Final classifications ==
=== General classification ===
Result
Rank	Rider	Team	Time
1	Ina-Yoko Teutenberg (GER)	Team HTC–Columbia Women	5h 40m 43s
2	Kirsten Wild (NED)	Cervelo TestTeam	+ 04s
3	Rochelle Gilmore (AUS)	Australia national team	+ 27s
4	Charlotte Becker (GER)	Cervelo TestTeam	+ 35s
5	Hye Keong Choi (KOR)	South Korea national team	+ 38s
6	Marta Tagliaferro (ITA)	Top Girls Fassa Bortolo-Ghezzi	+ 39s
7	Angela Hennig (GER)	Noris Cycling	+ 40s
8	Alessandra D'Ettore (ITA)	Top Girls Fassa Bortolo-Ghezzi	s.t.
9	Vilija Sereikaitė (LTU)	Lithuania national team	+ 42s
10	Aurore Verhoeven (FRA)	Esgl 93-Gsd Gestion	s.t.

== See also ==
- 2010 in women's road cycling
