= 2010 GP Stad Roeselare =

Race details
- Dates: 25 April 2010
- Stages: 1
- Distance: 135.5 km (84.2 mi)
- Winning time: 3h 37' 08"

Results
	Winner	Kirsten Wild (NED)	(Cervelo Test Team)
	Second	Chloe Hosking (AUS)	(Team HTC–Columbia Women)
	Third	Annemiek van Vleuten (NED)	(Nederland bloeit)

The 2010 GP Stad Roeselare was the 7th running of the women's GP Stad Roeselare, a women's bicycle race in Belgium. It was held over a distance of 135.5 kilometres (84.2 miles) on 25 April 2010, starting and finishing in Roeselare. It was rated by the UCI as a 1.1 category race.

== Results ==
	Cyclist	Team	Time
1	Kirsten Wild (NED)	Cervelo Test Team	3h 37' 08"
2	Chloe Hosking (AUS)	Team HTC–Columbia Women	s.t.
3	Annemiek van Vleuten (NED)	Nederland bloeit	s.t.
4	Emma Johansson (SWE)	Red Sun Cycling Team	s.t.
5	Christine Majerus (LUX)	ESGL 93-GSD Gestion	s.t.
6	Sarah Düster (GER)	Cervelo Test Team	s.t.
7	Joanne Kiesanowski (AUS)	Team TIBCO	s.t.
8	Sara Mustonen (NOR)	Hitec Products UCK	s.t.
9	Ellen van Dijk (NED)	Team HTC–Columbia Women	s.t.
10	Nicole Cooke (GBR)	Great Britain national team	s.t.

s.t. = same time

== See also ==
- 2010 in women's road cycling
