= 2010 Sparkassen Giro =

2010 Sparkassen Giro Bochum
Race details
- Dates: 8 August
- Stages: 1
- Distance: 74 km (45.98 mi)
- Winning time: 1h 58' 19"

Results
	Winner	Ellen van Dijk (NED)	(Team HTC–Columbia Women)
	Second	Tiffany Cromwell (AUS)	(Lotto Ladies Team)
	Third	Maaike Polspoel (BEL)	(Topsport Vlaanderen-Thompson)

The women's race of the 2010 Sparkassen Giro Bochum took place on 8 August 2010. It was the 10th women's edition of the Sparkassen Giro Bochum. The race started and ended in Bochum, Germany and spanned 74 km (46.0 mi). 57 of the 97 participants finished. The race is a UCI 1.1 category race.

== Race ==
The 2010 Sparkassen Giro Bochum was won by the Dutch rider Ellen van Dijk (Team HTC–Columbia Women), who won the sprint from a breakaway group of nine riders in wet and miserable conditions. Tiffany Cromwell and Maaike Polspoel finished second and third with over three times the length of a bicycle behind Van Dijk.

== Results ==
	Cyclist	Team	Time
1	Ellen van Dijk (NED)	Team HTC–Columbia Women	1h 58' 19"
2	Tiffany Cromwell (AUS)	Lotto Ladies Team	s.t.
3	Maaike Polspoel (BEL)	Topsport Vlaanderen-Thompson	s.t.
4	Vicki Whitelaw (AUS)	Lotto Ladies Team	s.t.
5	Valentina Carretta (ITA)	Top Girls Fassa Bortolo-Ghezzi	s.t.
6	Evelyn Stevens (USA)	Team HTC–Columbia Women	+ 12"
7	Katazyna Sosna (LTU)	Vaiano Solaristech	+ 28"
8	Chloe Hosking (AUS)	Team HTC–Columbia Women	+ 58"
9	Jolien D'Hoore (BEL)	Topsport Vlaanderen-Thompson	+ 58"
10	Kelly Druyts (BEL)	Topsport Vlaanderen-Thompson	+ 58"
