= 2011 UCI Women's Road World Cup =

Series of bicycle races

- Fourteenth edition of the UCI Women's Road World Cup

Details
- Dates: 27 March – 27 August
- Location: Europe and China
- Races: 9

Champions
- Individual champion: Annemiek van Vleuten (NED) (Nederland bloeit)
- Teams' champion: Nederland bloeit

The 2011 UCI Women's Road World Cup was the 14th edition of the UCI Women's Road World Cup. The calendar remained the same as the 2010 edition. Marianne Vos was the defending champion. Dutch rider Annemiek van Vleuten won the overall classification with wins in three events. Her Nederland bloeit teammate Marianne Vos came second in the individual standings and Nederland bloeit came first in the teams' classification.

== Races ==
| | Date | Race | Country | Winner | Team |
|---|---|---|---|---|---|
| #1 | 27 March | Trofeo Alfredo Binda-Comune di Cittiglio | Italy | Emma Pooley (GBR) | Garmin–Cervélo |
| #2 | 3 April | Tour of Flanders | Belgium | Annemiek Van Vleuten (NED) | Nederland bloeit |
| #3 | 16 April | Ronde van Drenthe | Netherlands | Marianne Vos (NED) | Nederland bloeit |
| #4 | 20 April | La Flèche Wallonne Féminine | Belgium | Marianne Vos (NED) | Nederland bloeit |
| #5 | 15 May | Tour of Chongming Island World Cup | China | Ina-Yoko Teutenberg (GER) | HTC–Highroad Women |
| #6 | 5 June | GP Ciudad de Valladolid | Spain | Marianne Vos (NED) | Nederland bloeit |
| #7 | 29 July | Open de Suède Vårgårda TTT | Sweden | Ellen van Dijk (NED); Charlotte Becker (GER); Amber Neben (USA); Judith Arndt (GER) | HTC–Highroad Women |
| #8 | 31 July | Open de Suède Vårgårda | Sweden | Annemiek Van Vleuten (NED) | Nederland bloeit |
| #9 | 27 August | GP de Plouay – Bretagne | France | Annemiek Van Vleuten (NED) | Nederland bloeit |

== Final ranking ==
Final ranking (1-10)
| Rank | Cyclist | Team | Points |
|---|---|---|---|
| 1 | Annemiek van Vleuten (NED) | Nederland bloeit | 362 |
| 2 | Marianne Vos (NED) | Nederland bloeit | 315 |
| 3 | Emma Johansson (SWE) | HiTec Products-UCK | 223 |
| 4 | Judith Arndt (GER) | HTC–Highroad Women | 184 |
| 5 | Ina Teutenberg (GER) | HTC–Highroad Women | 143 |
| 6 | Emma Pooley (GBR) | Garmin–Cervélo | 135 |
| 7 | Elizabeth Armitstead (GBR) | Garmin–Cervélo | 117 |
| 8 | Kirsten Wild (NED) | AA Drink–leontien.nl | 108 |
| 9 | Martine Bras (NED) | Dolmans Landscaping Team | 103 |
| 10 | Tatiana Antoshina (RUS) | Gauss | 87 |
