= 2010 UCI Women's Road World Cup =

Series of bicycle races

- Thirteenth edition of the UCI Women's Road World Cup

Details
- Dates: 28 March – 21 August
- Location: Europe and China
- Races: 9

Champions
- Individual champion: Marianne Vos (NED) (Nederland bloeit)
- Teams' champion: Cervélo TestTeam

The 2010 UCI Women's Road World Cup is the 13th edition of the UCI Women's Road World Cup. Although using most of the same races as the 2009 edition, there are some changes. The Tour de Berne has been dropped and replaced with the introduction of the new Tour of Chongming Island World Cup (which stands alongside the Tour of Chongming Island stage race and Tour of Chongming Island Time Trial) to World Cup status. Also new to the calendar is the GP Ciudad de Valladolid. The Montréal World Cup was originally planned for a late May slot, but later cancelled due to a loss of sponsorship. The Rund um die Nürnberger Altstadt was planned as the season finale, but was later downgraded to non-UCI status. Marianne Vos won the series, leading from the first round through to the finish. By winning two races, Emma Pooley won the most races.

== Races ==
	Date	Race	Country	Winner	Team
#1	28 March	Trofeo Alfredo Binda-Comune di Cittiglio	Italy	Marianne Vos (NED)	Nederland bloeit
#2	4 April	Tour of Flanders for Women	Belgium	Grace Verbeke (BEL)	Lotto Ladies Team
#3	10 April	Ronde van Drenthe	Netherlands	Loes Gunnewijk (NED)	Nederland bloeit
#4	21 April	La Flèche Wallonne Féminine	Belgium	Emma Pooley (GBR)	Cervélo TestTeam
#5	9 May	Tour of Chongming Island World Cup	China	Ina-Yoko Teutenberg (GER)	Team HTC–Columbia Women
#6	6 June	GP Ciudad de Valladolid	Spain	Charlotte Becker (GER)	Cervélo TestTeam
#7	30 July	Open de Suède Vårgårda TTT	Sweden	Charlotte Becker (GER) Regina Bruins (NED); Iris Slappendel (NED); Kirsten Wild (NED)	Cervélo TestTeam
#8	1 August	Open de Suède Vårgårda	Sweden	Kirsten Wild (NED)	Cervélo TestTeam
#9	21 August	GP de Plouay – Bretagne	France	Emma Pooley (GBR)	Cervélo TestTeam

== Final ranking ==
Final ranking (1–10)
Rank	Cyclist	Team	Points
1	Marianne Vos (NED)	Nederland bloeit	270
2	Emma Johansson (SWE)	RedSun Cycling Team	209
3	Kirsten Wild (NED)	Cervélo TestTeam	202
4	Charlotte Becker (GER)	Cervélo TestTeam	182
5	Judith Arndt (GER)	Team HTC–Columbia Women	161
6	Annemiek van Vleuten (NED)	Nederland bloeit	160
7	Grace Verbeke (BEL)	Lotto Ladies Team	158
8	Emma Pooley (GBR)	Cervélo TestTeam	157
9	Adrie Visser (NED)	Team HTC–Columbia Women	137
10	Nicole Cooke (GBR)		112
