= 2010 Tour of Chongming Island World Cup =

2010 UCI Women's Road World Cup, race 5 of 9

Race details
- Dates: 9 May 2010
- Stages: 1
- Distance: 138.6 km (86.12 mi)
- Winning time: 3h 30' 17"

Results
	Winner	Ina Teutenberg (GER)	(Team HTC–Columbia Women)
	Second	Kirsten Wild (NED)	(Cervélo TestTeam)
	Third	Rochelle Gilmore (AUS)	(Australia)

The 2010 Tour of Chongming Island World Cup was the first road race world cup running on the Tour of Chongming Island. It was held on 9 May 2010 over a distance of 138.6 kilometres (86.1 miles) and was the fifth race of the 2010 UCI Women's Road World Cup season. The race started and finished in Chengqiao, China. 98 elite female cyclists took part in the race and 80 of them finished.

HTC-Columbia's Ina-Yoko Teutenberg lived-up to pre-race expectation as she capped a successful week in China. The German national champion finished fastest in a sprint finish, which saw Kirsten Wild (Cervelo TestTeam) finish second and Rochelle Gilmore (Australia) third.

In addition to strong crosswinds, the peloton faced torrential rain throughout the 138 kilometre race. Despite the conditions, a 20-rider group was able to break free of the peloton halfway through the event. HTC-Columbia's strong representation with 6 riders in the group meant the onus was placed on other teams to chase. Cervelo were able to shut down the impromptu escape 150 metres from the finish. Despite the German team's effort, Teutenberg was able to come around at the last minute to take the sprint from Wild and Gilmore. The lead-out for Teutenberg, Ellen van Dijk also had with her sixth place a top-10 finish.

== General standings (top 10) ==
	Cyclists	Team	Time	World Cup points
1	Ina Teutenberg (GER)	Team HTC–Columbia Women	3h 30' 17"	100
2	Kirsten Wild (NED)	Cervélo TestTeam	s.t.	70
3	Rochelle Gilmore (AUS)	Australia	s.t.	40
4	Angela Hennig (GER)	Noris Cycling	s.t.	30
5	Marta Tagliaferro (ITA)	Top Girls Fassa Bortolo-Ghezzi	s.t.	25
6	Ellen van Dijk (NED)	Team HTC–Columbia Women	s.t.	20
7	Aurore Verhoeven (FRA)	ESGL 93-GSD Gestion	s.t.	15
8	Emma Petersen (NZL)	New Zealand	s.t.	10
9	Melissa Holt (NZL)	New Zealand	s.t.	9
10	Liu Xin (CHN)	Giant Ladies	s.t.	8

Results from uci.ch.
