= 2017 UEC European Track Championships – Women's elimination race =

Women's elimination race at the 2017 UEC European Track Championships
- UEC European Champion jersey
- Venue: Velodrom, Berlin
- Date: 19 October
- Competitors: 18 from 18 nations

Medalists
gold medal	Kirsten Wild	Netherlands
silver medal	Evgenia Augustinas	Russia
bronze medal	Maria Giulia Confalonieri	Italy

The Women's elimination race was held on 19 October 2017.

== Results ==
Rank	Name	Nation
1st place, gold medalist(s)	Kirsten Wild	Netherlands
2nd place, silver medalist(s)	Evgenia Augustinas	Russia
3rd place, bronze medalist(s)	Maria Giulia Confalonieri	Italy
4	Lotte Kopecky	Belgium
5	Ellie Dickinson	Great Britain
6	Trine Schmidt	Denmark
7	Romy Kasper	Germany
8	Olivija Baleišytė	Lithuania
9	Valentine Fortin	France
10	Ana Usabiaga	Spain
11	Lucie Hochmann	Czech Republic
12	Lydia Boylan	Ireland
13	Tereza Medveďová	Slovakia
14	Aline Seitz	Switzerland
15	Polina Pivovarova	Belarus
16	Monika Graczewska	Poland
17	Verena Eberhardt	Austria
18	Tetyana Klimchenko	Ukraine
