= 2003 UCI Track Cycling World Championships – Women's scratch =

The Women's Scratch was one of the six women's events at the 2003 UCI Track Cycling World Championships, held in Stuttgart, Germany.

Twenty cyclists from twenty countries were due to participate in the race, Victoria Pendleton of Great Britain did not start. Because of the number of entries, there were no qualification rounds for this discipline, only the final race.

== Final ==
The final and only race was run at 14:00 on August 2. The competition consisted on 40 laps, making a total of 10 km.

Rank	Name	Country
	Olga Slyusareva	Russia
	Rochelle Gilmore	Australia
	Adrie Visser	Netherlands
4	Giorgia Bronzini	Italy
5	Ine Wannijn	Belgium
6	Gema Pascual Torrecilla	Spain
7	Sarah Ulmer	New Zealand
8	Yoanka González Pérez	Cuba
9	Jiang Yanxia	China
10	Anke Wichmann	Germany
11	Juliette Vandekerckhove	France
12	Belem Guerrero Méndez	Mexico
13	Evelyn García	El Salvador
14	Sarah Uhl	United States
15	Mandy Poitras	Canada
16	Lada Kozlíková	Czech Republic
17	Lyudmyla Vypyraylo	Ukraine
18	Svetlana Ivakhonenkova	Belarus
19	Pernille Jakobsen	Denmark
DNS	Victoria Pendleton	United Kingdom
