= 2007 Sparkassen Giro =

2007 Sparkassen Giro Bochum
Race details
- Dates: 5 August
- Stages: 1
- Winning time: 2h 18' 04"

Results
	Winner	Hanka Kupfernagel (Germany)	(RC Charlottenburg Berlin)
	Second	Martina Corazza (Italy)	(A.S. Team FRW)
	Third	Christiane Soeder (Austria)	(Raleigh Lifeforce Pro Cycling Team)

The women's race of the 2007 Sparkassen Giro Bochum took place on 5 August 2007. It was the 7th women's edition of the Sparkassen Giro Bochum. The race started and ended in Bochum, Germany with 80 participants. The race is a UCI 1.1 category race.

== Results ==
	Cyclist	Team	Time
1	Hanka Kupfernagel (GER)	RC Charlottenburg Berlin	2h 18' 04"
2	Martina Corazza (ITA)	A.S. Team FRW	s.t.
3	Christiane Soeder (AUT)	Raleigh Lifeforce Pro Cycling Team	s.t.
4	Emma Pooley (GBR)	Team Specialized Designs for Women	s.t.
5	Rochelle Gilmore (AUS)	Menikini-Selle Italia-Gysko	+ 1' 35"
6	Charlotte Becker (GER)	Equipe Nürnberger Versicherung	+ 1' 35"
7	Ellen van Dijk (NED)	Vrienden van het Platteland	+ 1' 35"
8	Marina Jaunâtre (FRA)	Vienne Futuroscope	+ 1' 35"
9	Elena Kuchinskaya (RUS)	A.S. Team FRW	+ 1' 35"
10	Lorian Graham (AUS)	Topsport Vlaanderen–Thompson	+ 1' 35"
