= Rochelle Gilmore =

Australian cyclist (born 1981)

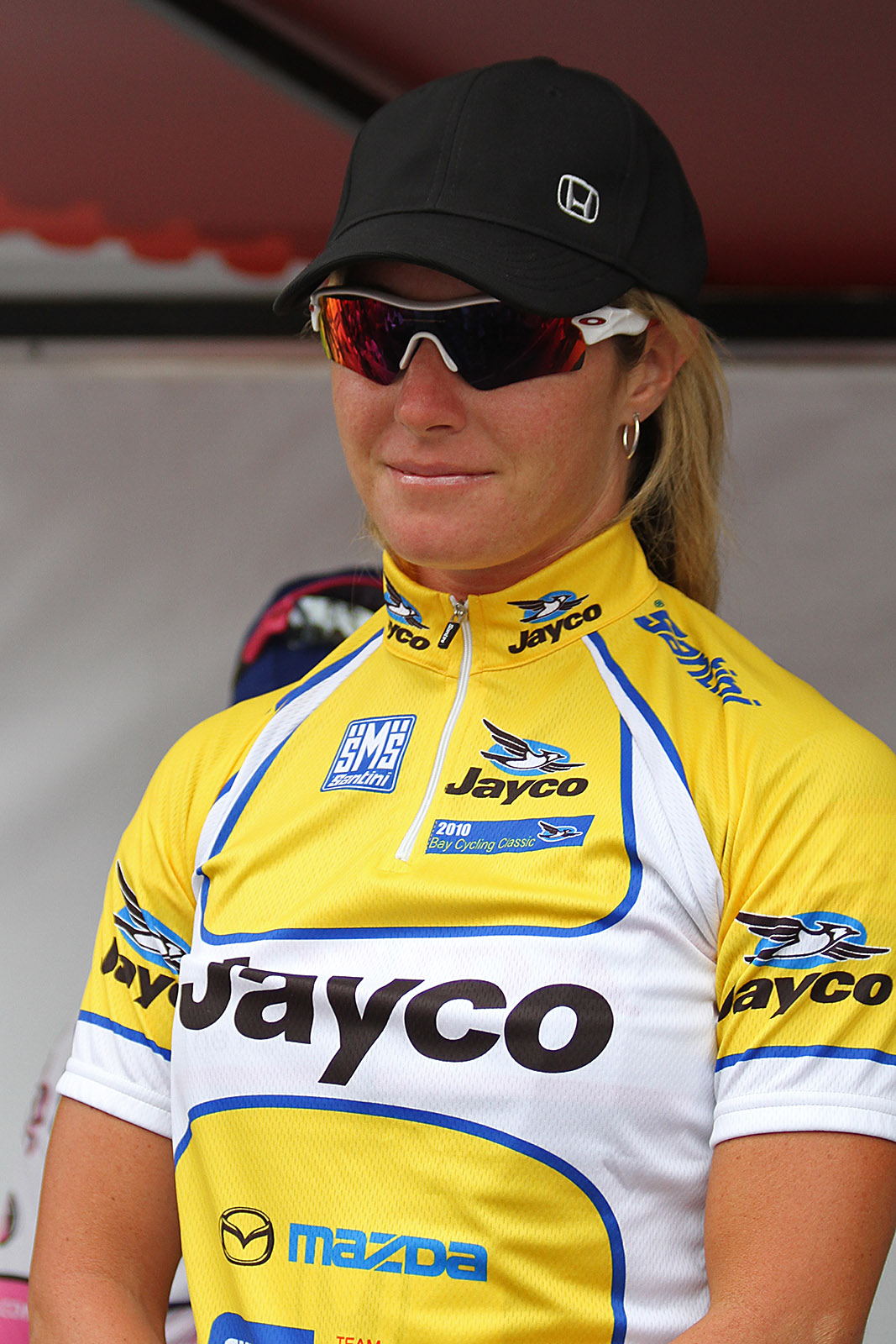
- Rochelle Gilmore in 2010

Personal information
- Full name: Rochelle Gilmore
- Born: 14 December 1981 (age 44) Sutherland, New South Wales, Australia

Cycling career
- Sport: Cycling
- Current team: Retired
- Disciplines: Road; Track
- Role: Rider; Team owner
- Rider type: Endurance

Professional teams
- 2001: Autotrader.com
- 2003: Ausra Gruodis Safi
- 2004: Team S.A.T.S.
- 2005–2006: Safi–Pasta Zara–Manhattan
- 2007–2008: Menikini – Selle Italia – Gysko
- 2009: HP-Teschner
- 2009–2011: Lotto–Belisol Ladiesteam
- 2012: Faren–Honda Team
- 2013–2015: Wiggle–Honda

Managerial team
- 2013–2018: Wiggle–Honda
Medal record
Commonwealth Games
Silver medal – second place	2002 Manchester	Points race
Silver medal – second place	2006 Melbourne	Points race
Gold medal – first place	2010 Delhi	Road race

Rochelle Gilmore (born 14 December 1981) is an Australian former racing cyclist, and former owner and manager of the defunct professional cycling team Wiggle High5. Since retiring from professional cycling she has been involved in sports commentating.

== Career ==
Born in Sutherland, New South Wales, Gilmore competed in track cycling in her teens, before specialising in road racing for more than 10 years. In 2006, she won a stage at the Geelong Women's Tour, took second behind teammate Katherine Bates in the points race at the Commonwealth Games in 2002 and 2006, and earned top five finishes in a Giro d'Italia Femminile stage, the Geelong World Cup, and the Liberty Classic. Gilmore was often referred to in the media as the 'bridesmaid', as she constantly finished runner-up in many events. In the road race at the 2010 Commonwealth Games, she broke the jinx and won the gold medal in the 112-kilometre (70-mile) race. After her retirement she said she felt she achieved her maximum potential during her career through hard work and extensive preparation.

In addition to founding Wiggle-Honda, in January 2015 Gilmore announced the launch of the High5 Dream Team, an Australian women's team competing in Australia's National Road Series aiming to help riders progress to road racing in Europe and to fill a gap created by Cycling Australia suspending its women's development programme due to financial problems.

In a blogpost for cyclingnews.com in November 2015 Gilmore announced that she had retired from competition.

== Major results ==
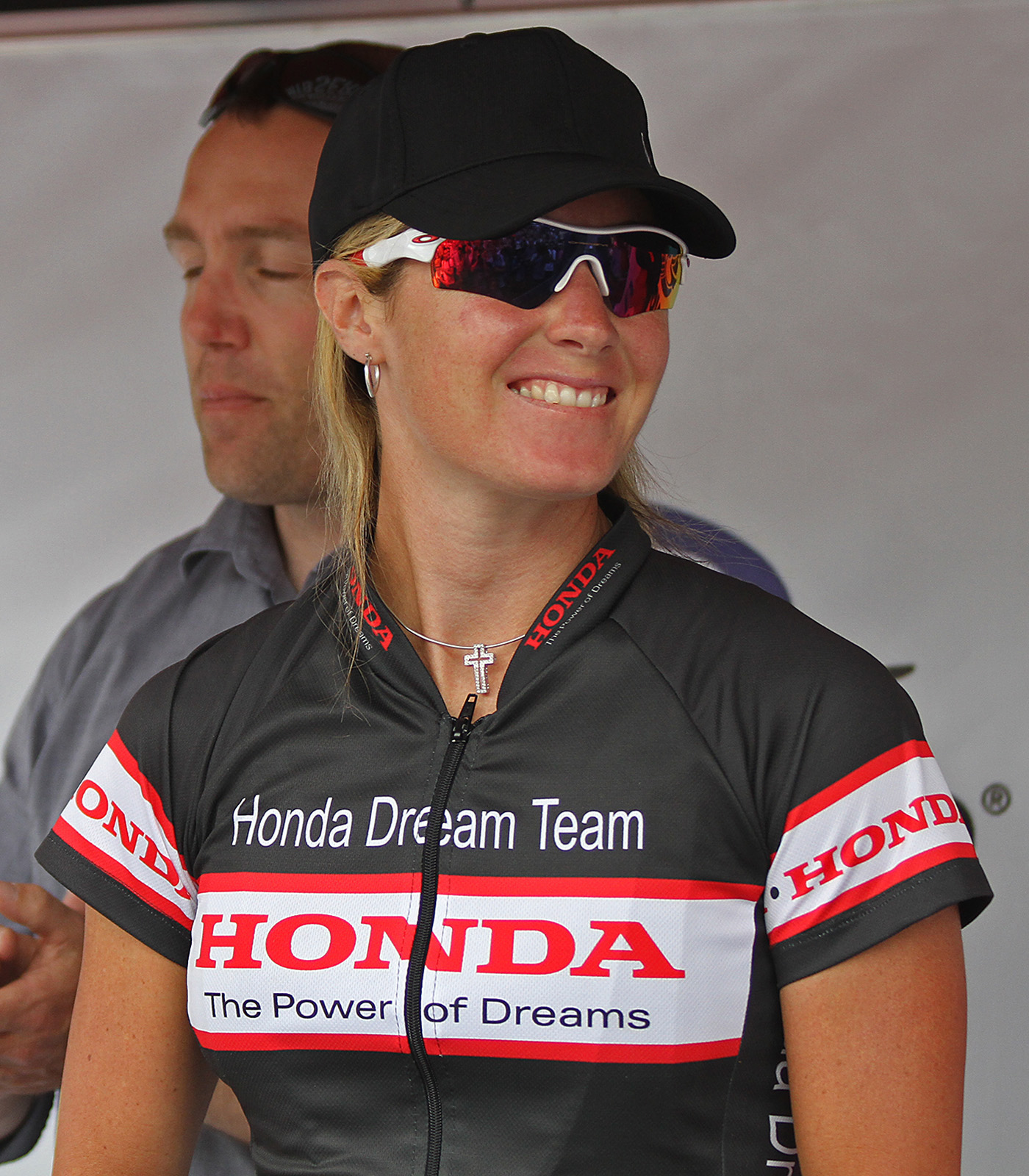
Gilmore wearing her Team Honda kit at the Jayco Bay Cycling Classic in 2010

=== Track ===
1999
National Junior Track Championships

1st Scratch
1st Points race
3rd Sprint
3rd 500m time trial

2nd Points race, UCI Junior Track Cycling World Championships
3rd Points race, Oceania Games
2000
2nd Points race, UCI Track Cycling World Cup Classics, Ipoh
2001
2nd Points race, UCI Track Cycling World Cup Classics, Pordenone
2002
2nd Scratch, UCI Track Cycling World Championships
2nd Points race, Commonwealth Games
2nd Scratch, UCI Track Cycling World Cup Classics, Moscow
2003
UCI Track Cycling World Cup Classics

1st Team sprint, Sydney
2nd Scratch, Sydney
3rd Team sprint, Cape Town

2nd Scratch, UCI Track Cycling World Championships
2004
2nd Scratch, UCI Track Cycling World Cup Classics, Manchester
2005
1st Points race, 2004–05 UCI Track Cycling World Cup Classics, Sydney
Oceania Track Championships

1st Points race
3rd Scratch

2006
2nd Points race, Commonwealth Games

=== Road ===
1999
3rd Time trial, National Junior Road Championships
2001
1st GP Carnevale d'Europa
1st Stage 2b Giro d'Italia Femminile
3rd Canberra Women's Classic
9th Rotterdam Tour
2002
1st Overall Bay Classic Series

1st Stages 2 & 4

1st Stage 5 Tour de Snowy
2nd Australia World Cup
10th Rotterdam Tour
2003
1st Stage 8 Giro d'Italia Femminile
1st Stage 1 Geelong Tour
3rd Primavera Rosa
3rd Sparkassen Giro Bochum
3rd Tjejtrampet
6th Rotterdam Tour
7th GP Liberazione
7th Rund um die Nürnberger Altstadt
8th Overall UCI Women's Road World Cup
9th Australia World Cup
2004
1st Stage 4 Bay Classic Series
5th Australia World Cup
2005
1st Geelong Women's World Cup
2nd GP Liberazione
2nd Rund um die Nürnberger Altstadt
6th Road race, Oceania Road Cycling Championships
2006
1st Stage 2 Geelong Tour
5th Australia World Cup
5th Liberty Classic
8th GP Liberazione
10th Road race, Commonwealth Games
2007
1st Road race, Oceania Road Cycling Championships
1st Stage 1 La Route de France
2nd Grand Prix de Dottignies
2nd Drentse 8 van Dwingeloo
4th Novilon Internationale Damesronde van Drenthe
4th Rund um die Nürnberger Altstadt
5th GP Liberazione
5th Sparkassen Giro
6th Ronde van Drenthe World Cup
10th Tour de Berne
2008
Tour de Prince Edward Island

1st Stages 1, 3 & 5

1st Maastricht Omnium
2nd GP Liberazione
2nd Gran Premio Comune di Fabricco
2nd Sparkassen Giro Bochum
3rd Drentse 8 van Dwingeloo
4th Australia World Cup
5th Ronde van Drenthe
2009
1st Sparkassen Giro Bochum
Women's Tour of New Zealand

1st Stages 1 & 2

2nd Ronde van Gelderland
2nd GP Stad Roeselare
2nd Rund um die Nürnberger Altstadt
3rd Road race, Oceania Road Cycling Championships (February)
3rd Road race, Oceania Road Cycling Championships (November)
4th Drentse 8 van Dwingeloo
5th Grand Prix de Dottignies
2010
1st Road race, Commonwealth Games
2nd Ronde van Gelderland
2nd Omloop van Borsele
Tour of Chongming Island

3rd Overall Stage race
3rd World Cup

4th Overall Ladies Tour of Qatar
7th Grand Prix de Dottignies
10th Omloop Door Middag-Humsterland
2011
1st Overall Bay Classic Series

1st Stages 1 & 3

3rd Ronde van Gelderland
4th Road race, Oceania Road Cycling Championships
4th Grand Prix de Dottignies
4th GP Stad Roeselare
5th Ronde van Drenthe
8th Overall Ladies Tour of Qatar

1st Stage 1

8th Tour of Chongming Island World Cup
9th Drentse 8 van Dwingeloo
2012
2nd Grand Prix Cycliste de Gatineau
2nd Liberty Classic
4th Overall Bay Classic Series
Tour of Chongming Island

5th Overall Stage race
5th World Cup

9th Erondegemse Pijl
2015
5th London Nocturne
