= Laure Werner =

Belgian cyclist (born 1981)

Personal information
- Born: 22 February 1981 (age 45) Belgium

Cycling career
- Sport: Cycling
- Discipline: Road cycling

Professional teams
- 2000–2007: Vlaanderen-Capri Sonne-T-Interim
- 2008: AA Cycling Team
- 2011: Lotto Honda Team

Laure Werner (born 22 February 1981) is a road cyclist from Belgium. She represented her nation at the 2005, 2006 and 2008 UCI Road World Championships.

== Major results ==
2008
10th Omloop Het Volk
