= 2008 Omloop Het Volk (women's race) =

Race details
- Dates: 16 March 2008
- Stages: 1
- Distance: 126.0 km (78.3 mi)
- Winning time: 3h 18' 00"

Results
	Winner	Kirsten Wild (NED)	(AA-Drink Cycling Team)
	Second	Angela Brodtka (GER)	(DSB Bank Ladies Cycling-Team)
	Third	Emma Johansson (SWE)	(AA-Drink Cycling Team)

The 2008 Omloop Het Volk was the 3rd edition of the women's Omloop Het Volk road cycling one-day race, which was held on 16 March.

The race was won by Dutch rider Kirsten Wild.

== Results ==
Final general classification
Rank	Rider	Team	Time
1	Kirsten Wild (NED)	AA-Drink Cycling Team	3h 18' 00"
2	Angela Brodtka (GER)	DSB Bank Ladies Cycling-Team	+ 0"
3	Emma Johansson (SWE)	AA-Drink Cycling Team	+ 0"
4	Martine Bras (NED)	Vrienden van het Platteland	+ 0"
5	Tanja Hennes (GER)	Team Specialized Designs	+ 0"
6	Loes Markerink (NED)	Team Flexpoint	+ 0"
7	Miho Oki (JAP)	Menikini - Selle Italia	+ 0"
8	An Van Rie (BEL)	Vrienden van het Platteland	+ 0"
9	Francesca Tognali (ITA)	Top Girls Fassa Bortolo Raxy Line	+ 0"
10	Laure Werner (BEL)	AA-Drink Cycling Team	+ 0"
