= 2006 Sparkassen Giro =

2006 Sparkassen Giro Bochum
Race details
- Dates: 13 August
- Stages: 1
- Distance: 73 km (45 mi)
- Winning time: 1h 52' 17"

Results
	Winner	Oenone Wood (Australia)	(Equipe Nürnberger Versicherung)
	Second	Tanja Schmidt-Hennes (Germany)	(Buitenpoort - Flexpoint Team)
	Third	Chantal Beltman (the Netherlands)	(Vrienden van het Platteland)

The women's race of the 2006 Sparkassen Giro Bochum took place on 13 August 2006. It was the 6th women's edition of the Sparkassen Giro Bochum. The race started and ended in Bochum, Germany with 137 participants and spanned 73 km (45.4 mi). The race is a UCI 1.1 category race.

== Results ==
	Cyclist	Team	Time
1	Oenone Wood (AUS)	Equipe Nürnberger Versicherung	1h 52' 17"
2	Tanja Schmidt-Hennes (GER)	Buitenpoort - Flexpoint Team	s.t.
3	Chantal Beltman (NED)	Vrienden van het Platteland	s.t.
4	Paulina Brezena (POL)	Polish National Team	s.t.
5	Daiva Tušlaitė (LTU)	Lithuanian National Team	s.t.
6	Theresa Senff (GER)	AA-Drink Cycling Team	s.t.
7	Trixi Worrack (GER)	Equipe Nürnberger Versicherung	+ 8"
8	Adrie Visser (NED)	AA-Drink Cycling Team	+ 14"
9	Claudia Häusler (GER)	Equipe Nürnberger Versicherung	+ 39"
10	Suzanne de Goede (NED)	AA-Drink Cycling Team	+ 1' 33"
11	Ellen van Dijk (NED)	Vrienden van het Platteland	+ 1' 33"
12	Angela Brodtka (GER)	AA-Drink Cycling Team	+ 1' 33"
