= 2011 Open de Suède Vårgårda =

2011 UCI Women's Road World Cup, race 8 of 9

Race details
- Dates: 31 July 2011
- Stages: 1
- Distance: 132 km (82.02 mi)
- Winning time: 3h 19' 49"

Results
	Winner	Annemiek van Vleuten (NED)	(Nederland Bloeit)
	Second	Ellen van Dijk (NED)	(HTC–Highroad Women)
	Third	Nicole Cooke (GBR)	(MCipollini–Giambenini)

The 2011 Open de Suède Vårgårda was the 6th road race running on the Open de Suède Vårgårda. It was held on 31 July 2011 over a distance of 132 kilometres (82.0 miles) and was the eight race of the 2011 UCI Women's Road World Cup season. The race was won by Annemiek van Vleuten ahead of Ellen van Dijk and Nicole Cooke.

== General standings (top 10) ==
	Cyclists	Team	Time	World Cup points
1	Annemiek van Vleuten (NED)	Nederland Bloeit	3h 19' 49"	100
2	Ellen van Dijk (NED)	HTC–Highroad Women	s.t.	70
3	Nicole Cooke (GBR)	MCipollini–Giambenini	s.t.	40
4	Ina Teutenberg (GER)	HTC–Highroad Women	s.t.	30
5	Irene van den Broek (NED)	AA Drink–leontien.nl	s.t.	25
6	Kirsten Wild (NED)	AA Drink–leontien.nl	s.t.	20
7	Iris Slappendel (NED)	Garmin–Cervélo	s.t.	15
8	Martine Bras (NED)	Dolmans Landscaping Team	s.t.	10
9	Judith Arndt (GER)	HTC–Highroad Women	s.t.	9
10	Emma Johansson (SWE)	Hitec Products–UCK	s.t.	8

Results from uci.ch.
