= Aurore Verhoeven =

French cyclist

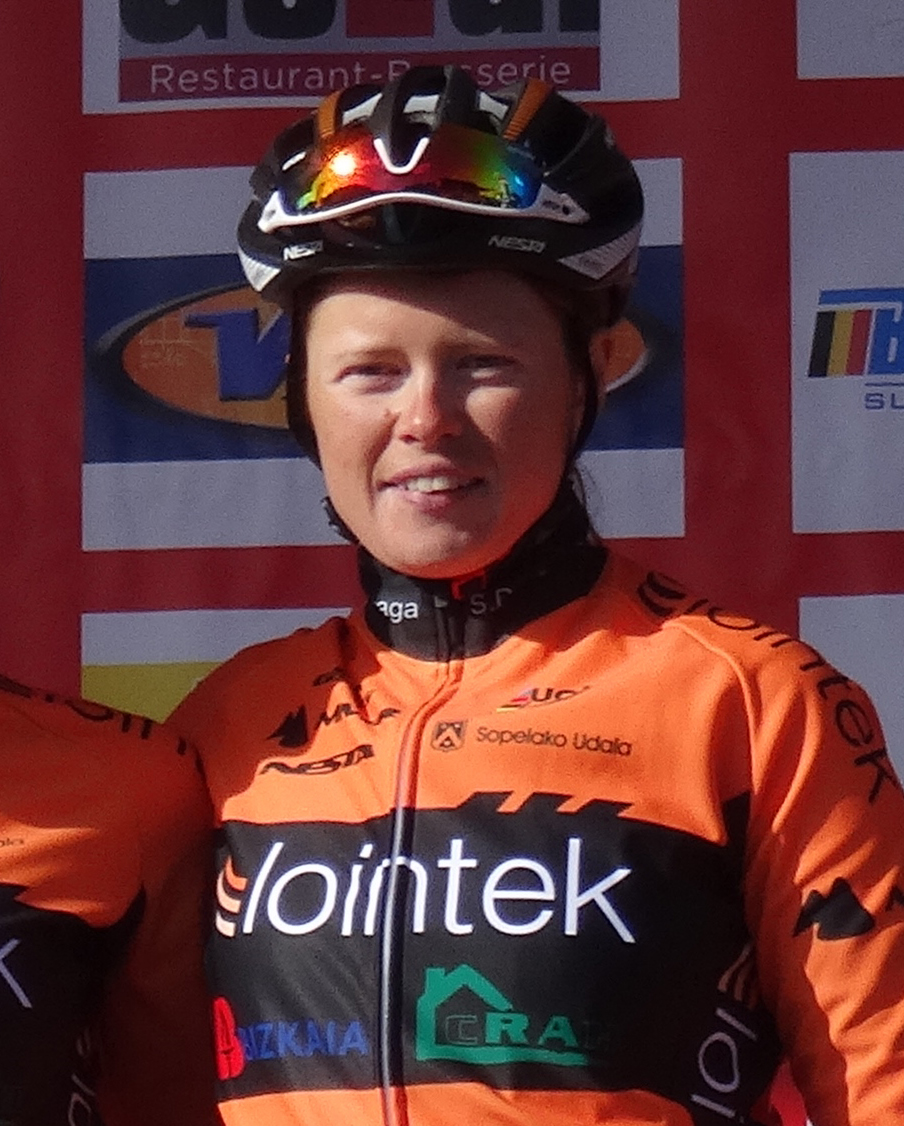
- Verhoeven in 2015

Personal information
- Full name: Aurore Verhoeven
- Born: 15 January 1990 (age 36)

Cycling career
- Sport: Cycling
- Discipline: Road
- Role: Rider

Amateur teams
- 2017: De Sprinters Malderen
- 2018: Macogep–Argon18–Girondins
- 2019: De Sprinters Malderen

Professional teams
- 2009: Vision1 Racing
- 2010: Specialized Mazda Samson
- 2011: Gauss
- 2013: Team Futurumshop.nl–Polaris
- 2014–2016: Lointek
- 2020: Multum Accountants–LSK Ladies

Aurore Verhoeven (born 15 January 1990) is a French professional racing cyclist, who most recently rode for UCI Women's Continental Team Multum Accountants–LSK Ladies.

== Major results ==
2008
4th Road race, UEC European Junior Road Championships
6th Road race, UCI Juniors World Championships
2010
7th Tour of Chongming Island World Cup
8th Chrono des Nations
10th Overall Tour of Chongming Island Stage race
2013
8th Classica Citta di Padova
2015
7th Grand Prix de Dottignies
2017
6th Grand Prix de Dottignies
9th Diamond Tour
2019
10th Erondegemse Pijl

== See also ==
- List of 2015 UCI Women's Teams and riders
