= Cycling at the 2002 Commonwealth Games – Women's points race =

Cycling Track – Women's points race at the 2002 Commonwealth Games
- Venue: National Cycling Centre
- Dates: 30 July
- Competitors: 13 from 7 nations
- Winning points: 37

Medalists
gold medal	Katherine Bates	Australia
silver medal	Rochelle Gilmore	Australia
bronze medal	Clara Hughes	Canada

The women's points race at the 2002 Commonwealth Games was part of the cycling programme, which took place on 30 July 2002.

This track cycling event consists of a single race. During the race, cyclists can score points in two ways; the cyclist with the most points at the end of the race wins. The first way to score points is to lap the group. Each time a cyclist gained a full lap on the peloton, she scored 10 points. The other method of scoring points was to place in the intermediate sprints. The first four cyclists in each of ten sprints would score, with the first finisher getting 5 points, the second 3, the third 2, and the fourth 1 point.

== Results ==
The race started at 20:30.

Rank	Name	Sprint Points	Extra Laps	Total Points
1st place, gold medalist(s)	Katherine Bates (AUS)	27	1	37
2nd place, silver medalist(s)	Rochelle Gilmore (AUS)	23	0	23
3rd place, bronze medalist(s)	Clara Hughes (CAN)	10	1	20
4	Alison Wright (AUS)	17	0	17
5	Sarah Ulmer (NZL)	16	0	16
6	Nicole Cooke (WAL)	4	1	14
7	Frances Newstead (ENG)	4	1	14
8	Melanie Szubrycht (ENG)	4	0	4
9	Erin Carter (CAN)	3	0	3
10	Hsu Min Chung (MAS)	0	0	0
11	Rachel Heal (ENG)	0	0	0
12	Joanne Cavill (SCO)	0	0	0
	Fiona Carswell (NZL)	2	0	DNF
