= 2018 UCI Track Cycling World Championships – Women's points race =

Women's points race at the 2018 UCI Track Cycling World Championships
- Venue: Omnisport Apeldoorn
- Location: Apeldoorn, Netherlands
- Dates: 4 March 2018
- Competitors: 22 from 22 nations
- Winning points: 49

Medalists
gold medal	Kirsten Wild	Netherlands
silver medal	Jennifer Valente	United States
bronze medal	Jasmin Duehring	Canada

The women's points race competition at the 2018 UCI Track Cycling World Championships was held on 4 March 2018 at the Omnisport Apeldoorn in Apeldoorn, Netherlands.

== Results ==
100 laps (25 km) were raced with 10 sprints.

Rank	Name	Nation	Lap points	Sprint points	Total points
1st place, gold medalist(s)	Kirsten Wild	Netherlands	20	29	49
2nd place, silver medalist(s)	Jennifer Valente	United States	20	23	43
3rd place, bronze medalist(s)	Jasmin Duehring	Canada	20	10	30
4	Gulnaz Badykova	Russia	20	9	29
5	Charlotte Becker	Germany	20	5	25
6	Trine Schmidt	Denmark	20	4	24
7	Andrea Waldis	Switzerland	20	3	23
8	Coralie Demay	France	20	1	21
9	Sofía Arreola	Mexico	20	0	20
10	Jolien D'Hoore	Belgium	0	15	15
11	Letizia Paternoster	Italy	0	10	10
12	Elinor Barker	Great Britain	0	7	7
13	Ina Savenka	Belarus	0	3	3
14	Verena Eberhardt	Austria	0	2	2
15	Jarmila Machačová	Czech Republic	0	0	0
16	Lydia Gurley	Ireland	0	0	0
17	Hanna Solovey	Ukraine	0	0	0
18	Katarzyna Pawłowska	Poland	0	0	0
19	Anita Stenberg	Norway	0	0	0
20	Yang Qianyu	Hong Kong	−20	0	−20
–	Alžbeta Bačíková	Slovakia	−40	DNF	
–	Ane Iriarte	Spain	−40	DNF	
