= 2019 UCI Track Cycling World Championships – Women's points race =

Women's points race at the 2019 UCI Track Cycling World Championships
- Venue: BGŻ Arena
- Location: Pruszków, Poland
- Dates: 3 March
- Competitors: 22 from 22 nations
- Winning points: 29

Medalists
gold medal	Alexandra Manly	Australia
silver medal	Lydia Boylan	Ireland
bronze medal	Kirsten Wild	Netherlands

The Women's points race competition at the 2019 UCI Track Cycling World Championships was held on 3 March 2019.

== Results ==
The race was started at 14:00. 100 (25 km) laps were raced with 10 sprints.

Rank	Name	Nation	Lap points	Sprint points	Total points
1st place, gold medalist(s)	Alexandra Manly	Australia	20	9	29
2nd place, silver medalist(s)	Lydia Boylan	Ireland	20	8	28
3rd place, bronze medalist(s)	Kirsten Wild	Netherlands	0	26	26
4	Gulnaz Badykova	Russia	20	6	26
5	Yang Qianyu	Hong Kong	20	0	20
6	Maria Giulia Confalonieri	Italy	0	14	14
7	Neah Evans	Great Britain	0	10	10
8	Jennifer Valente	United States	0	9	9
9	Ina Savenka	Belarus	0	9	9
10	Lotte Kopecky	Belgium	0	9	9
11	Amber Joseph	Barbados	0	7	7
12	Sofía Arreola	Mexico	0	4	4
13	Coralie Demay	France	0	3	3
14	Verena Eberhardt	Austria	0	3	3
15	Andrea Waldis	Switzerland	0	1	1
16	Hanna Solovey	Ukraine	0	0	0
17	Trine Schmidt	Denmark	0	0	0
18	Irene Usabiaga	Spain	0	0	0
19	Jarmila Machačová	Czech Republic	0	0	0
—	Nikol Płosaj	Poland	−20	Did not finish	
—	Charlotte Becker	Germany	0	Did not finish	
—	Olivija Baleišytė	Lithuania	0	Did not finish	
