= Cycling at the 2006 Commonwealth Games – Women's points race =

The women's points race at the 2006 Commonwealth Games took place on March 17, 2006 at the Vodafone Arena.

== Results ==
Rank	Name	Total Points
1st place, gold medalist(s)	Katherine Bates (AUS)	30
2nd place, silver medalist(s)	Rochelle Gilmore (AUS)	21
3rd place, bronze medalist(s)	Kate Cullen (SCO)	13
4	Gina Grain (CAN)	12
5	Mandy Poitras (CAN)	10
6	Joanne Kiesanowski (NZL)	9
7	Emma Jones (ENG)	4
8	Nikki Harris (ENG)	3
9	Iona Wynter (JAM)	2
10	Alexis Rhodes (AUS)	2
11	Catherine Sell (NZL)	2
12	Tammy Boyd (NZL)	1
13	Uracca Leow Hoay Sim (MAS)	1
14	Noor Azian Binti Alias (MAS)	0
