= 2020 UCI Track Cycling World Championships – Women's scratch =

Women's scratch at the 2020 UCI Track Cycling World Championships
- Venue: Velodrom
- Location: Berlin, Germany
- Dates: 26 February
- Competitors: 23 from 23 nations

Medalists
gold medal	Kirsten Wild	Netherlands
silver medal	Jennifer Valente	United States
bronze medal	Maria Martins	Portugal

The Women's scratch competition at the 2020 UCI Track Cycling World Championships was held on 26 February 2020.

== Results ==
The race was started at 19:58. First rider across the line without a net lap loss won.

Rank	Name	Nation	Laps down
1st place, gold medalist(s)	Kirsten Wild	Netherlands	
2nd place, silver medalist(s)	Jennifer Valente	United States	
3rd place, bronze medalist(s)	Maria Martins	Portugal	
4	Laura Kenny	Great Britain	
5	Martina Fidanza	Italy	
6	Olivija Baleišytė	Lithuania	
7	Anita Stenberg	Norway	
8	Irene Usabiaga	Spain	
9	Victoire Berteau	France	
10	Alžbeta Bačíková	Slovakia	
11	Alexandra Manly	Australia	
12	Palina Pivavarava	Belarus	
13	Łucja Pietrzak	Poland	
14	Aline Seitz	Switzerland	
15	Amber Joseph	Barbados	
16	Lena Reißner	Germany	
17	Kateřina Kohoutková	Czech Republic	
18	Rinata Sultanova	Kazakhstan	
19	Anastasia Chulkova	Russia	
20	Huang Zhilin	China	
21	Lydia Gurley	Ireland	
22	Kie Furuyama	Japan	
23	Verena Eberhardt	Austria	
