= Tammy Boyd =

New Zealand cyclist (born 1980)

Personal information
- Full name: Tamara Boyd
- Born: 13 February 1980 (age 46) Invercargill, New Zealand

Cycling career
- Sport: Cycling
- Disciplines: Road cycling, Track cycling

Professional teams
- 2006: Les Pruneaux d'Agen
- 2007: Lotto–Belisol Ladiesteam

Tamara Boyd (born 13 February 1980) is a track and road cyclist from New Zealand. She has been a consistent performer on road and track but she won her first senior title at the 2006 national track championships at Wanganui, winning the scratch race. She represented her nation at the 2005 UCI Road World Championships in the road race and 2006 Commonwealth Games in the points race. On the track she became national scratch champion in 2006.
