= Lydia Boylan =

Irish racing cyclist (born 1987)

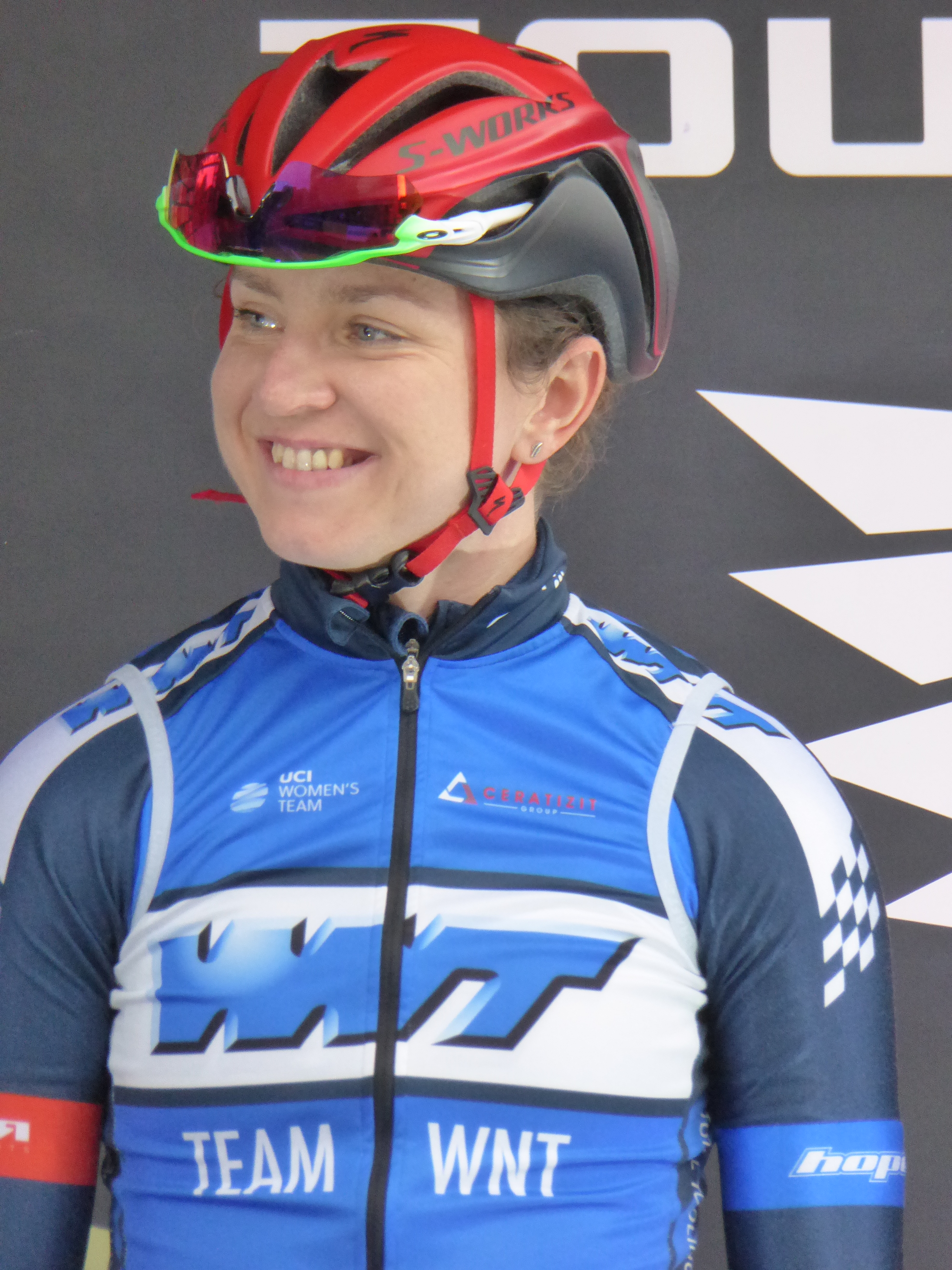
- Boylan in 2017

Personal information
- Born: 19 July 1987 (age 39) Dublin, Ireland

Cycling career
- Sport: Cycling
- Current team: Qromia Women's Cycling Team
- Disciplines: Road; Track
- Role: Rider

Amateur teams
- 2013: Les Filles Racing Team (guest)
- 2019–2020: Torelli–Assure
- 2022–: Qromia Women's Cycling Team

Professional teams
- 2013: CTC
- 2014: Velosport Pasta Montegrappa
- 2015–2018: Team WNT
Medal record
Women's track cycling
Representing Ireland
World Championships
Silver medal – second place	2019 Pruszków	Points race
European Championships
Silver medal – second place	2017 Berlin	Madison

Lydia Boylan (born 19 July 1987) is an Irish racing cyclist, who competes in the track and road disciplines of the sport. Boylan won the Irish National Road Race Championships in 2015, 2016 and 2017.

She competed for Northern Ireland at the 2014 Commonwealth Games in Glasgow, where she finished 21st in the women's road race, 14th in the scratch race and 16th in the points race. She is eligible to represent Northern Ireland through her mother. She rode at the 2015 UCI Track Cycling World Championships. She has competed for the WNT–Rotor Pro Cycling and Weston Homes–Torelli–Assure–Fred Whitton teams during her career.

== Personal life ==
Outside of cycling, Boylan is a qualified engineer, graduating with a bachelor's degree in civil engineering from University College Dublin in 2008 and a master's degree in Earthquake Engineering from Imperial College London in 2010. Since November 2013 she has combined her cycling career with teaching at the University of Nottingham's School of Architecture.

== Major results ==
2015
1st Road race, National Road Championships
2016
1st Road race, National Road Championships
2017
1st Road race, National Road Championships
1st Scratch, National Track Championships
1st Stage 4 Setmana Ciclista Valenciana
2nd Madison, UEC European Track Championships (with Lydia Gurley)
6th Overall Six Days of London

2nd Scratch
2nd Madison (with Katie Archibald)

2018
1st Omnium, National Track Championships
2019
2nd Points race, UCI Track Cycling World Championships
2022
1st Mallorca 167
