= 2010 in women's road cycling =

== UCI Road World Rankings ==
Top-ranked individual	Second-ranked individual	Third-ranked individual	Top-ranked team	Top-ranked nation
Marianne Vos (NED); Nederland Bloeit	Judith Arndt (GER); HTC Columbia Women	Kirsten Wild (NED); Cervelo Test Team	Nederland Bloeit	Netherlands

== World Championships ==
Race	Date	Winner	Second	Third
World Championship Time Trial	September 29	Emma Pooley (GBR)	Judith Arndt (GER)	Linda Villumsen (NZL)
World Championship Road Race	October 2	Giorgia Bronzini (ITA)	Marianne Vos (NED)	Emma Johansson (SWE)

== UCI World Cup ==
	Date	Race	Country	Winner	Team
#1	27 March	Trofeo Alfredo Binda-Comune di Cittiglio	Italy	Emma Pooley (GBR)	Cervélo TestTeam
#2	3 April	Tour of Flanders	Belgium	Annemiek Van Vleuten (NED)	Nederland bloeit
#3	16 April	Ronde van Drenthe	Netherlands	Marianne Vos (NED)	Nederland bloeit
#4	20 April	La Flèche Wallonne Féminine	Belgium	Marianne Vos (NED)	Nederland bloeit
#5	15 May	Tour of Chongming Island World Cup	China	Ina-Yoko Teutenberg (GER)	Team HTC–Columbia Women
#6	5 June	GP Ciudad de Valladolid	Spain	Marianne Vos (NED)	Nederland bloeit
#7	29 July	Open de Suède Vårgårda TTT	Sweden	Ellen van Dijk (NED); Charlotte Becker (GER); Amber Neben (USA); Judith Arndt (GER)	Team HTC–Columbia Women
#8	31 July	Open de Suède Vårgårda	Sweden	Annemiek Van Vleuten (NED)	Nederland bloeit
#9	27 August	GP de Plouay – Bretagne	France	Annemiek Van Vleuten (NED)	Nederland bloeit

== Single day races (1.1 and 1.2) ==
Race	Date	Cat.	Winner
(Belgium) Omloop Het Nieuwsblad	February 27	1.2	Emma Johansson (SWE)
(Italy) GP Comune di Cornaredo	March 7	1.2	Rasa Leleivytė (LTU)
(Belgium) Grand Prix de Dottignies	April 5	1.2	Kirsten Wild (NED)
(Netherlands) Drentse 8	April 8	1.1	Ina-Yoko Teutenberg (GER)
(Netherlands) Novilon Eurocup Ronde van Drenthe	April 11	1.1	Annemiek van Vleuten (NED)
(Netherlands) Ronde van Gelderland	April 17	1.2	Kirsten Wild (NED)
(Netherlands) Omloop van Borsele	April 24	1.2	Kirsten Wild (NED)
(Belgium) GP Stad Roeselare	April 25	1.1	Kirsten Wild (NED)
(Italy) GP Liberazione	April 25	1.2	Monia Baccaille (ITA)
(Switzerland) Grand Prix de Suisse	April 30	1.1	Emma Pooley (GBR)
(Luxembourg) Grand Prix Elsy Jacobs	May 1	1.1	Emma Pooley (GBR)
(Luxembourg) GP Mameranus	May 2	1.2	Emma Johansson (SWE)
(Netherlands) Therme kasseienomloop	June 6	1.2	Regina Bruins (NED)
(United States) Liberty Classic	June 6	1.1	Ina-Yoko Teutenberg (GER)
(Spain) Emakumeen Saria	June 8	1.2	Marianne Vos (NED)
(Canada) Chrono Gatineau	June 12	1.2	Evelyn Stevens (USA)
(Canada) Grand Prix Cycliste de Gatineau	June 13	1.1	Joëlle Numainville (CAN)
(Italy) GP Cento Carnevale d'Europa	July 17	1.2	Giorgia Bronzini (ITA)
(Belgium) Dwars door de Westhoek	July 18	1.2	Liesbet De Vocht (BEL)
(Germany) Sparkassen Giro	August 8	1.1	Ellen van Dijk (NED)
(Netherlands) Valkenburg Hills Classic	August 8	1.2	Grace Verbeke (BEL)
(Netherlands) Omloop Door Middag-Humsterland	August 28	1.2	Vera Koedooder (NED)
(Italy) Memorial Davide Fardelli – Cronometro Individuale	September 5	1.2	Amber Neben (USA)
(France) Chrono Champenois	September 12	1.1	Anne Samplonius (CAN)
(France) Chrono des Nations	October 17	1.1	Jeannie Longo-Ciprelli (FRA)

== Stage races (2.1 and 2.2) ==
Race	Date	Cat.	Winner
Ladies Tour of Qatar	February 3–5	2.1	Kirsten Wild (NED)
Women's Tour of New Zealand	February 24–28	2.2	Shelley Olds (USA)
(Czech Republic) Gracia–Orlová	April 29 – May 2	2.2	Marianne Vos (NED)
(China) Tour of Chongming Island	May 5–7	2.1	Ina-Yoko Teutenberg (GER)
(France) Tour de l'Aude Cycliste Féminin	May 14–23	2.1	Emma Pooley (GBR)
(Spain) Iurreta-Emakumeen Bira	June 10–13	2.1	Claudia Häusler (GER)
(Netherlands) Rabo Ster Zeeuwsche Eilanden	June 17–19	2.2	Kirsten Wild (NED)
(Italy) Giro del Trentino Alto Adige-Südtirol	June 18–20	2.1	Emma Pooley (GBR)
(Czech Republic) Tour de Feminin-O cenu Českého Švýcarska	July 8–11	2.2	Trixi Worrack (GER)
(Italy) Giro d'Italia Femminile	July 2–11	2.1	Mara Abbott (USA)
(France) Tour Féminin en Limousin	July 22–25	2.2	Grete Treier (EST)
(Germany) International Thüringen Rundfahrt der Frauen	July 20–25	2.1	Olga Zabelinskaya (RUS)
La Route de France	August 8–14	2.1	Annemiek van Vleuten (NED)
(France) Trophée d'Or Féminin	August 24–28	2.2	Emma Johansson (SWE)
(Netherlands) Holland Ladies Tour	August 31 – September 5	2.2	Marianne Vos (NED)
(France) Tour Cycliste Féminin International de l'Ardèche	September 7–11	2.2	Vicki Whitelaw (AUS)
(Italy) Giro della Toscana Int. Femminile – Memorial Michela Fanini	September 14–19	2.1	Judith Arndt (GER)

== See also ==
- 2010 in men's road cycling
