= 2010 Open de Suède Vårgårda TTT =

2010 Open de Suède Vårgårda Team time trial
2010 UCI Women's Road World Cup, race 7 of 9

Race details
- Dates: 30 July 2010
- Stages: 1
- Distance: 41 km (25.48 mi)
- Winning time: 55' 34"

Results
	Winner	Cervélo Test Team
	Second	Team HTC–Columbia Women
	Third	Nederland Bloeit

The 2010 Open de Suède Vårgårda – team time trial was the 3rd team time trial running on the Open de Suède Vårgårda. It was held on 30 July 2010 over a distance of 41 kilometres (25.5 miles) and was the seventh race of the 2010 UCI Women's Road World Cup season.

== General standings (top 10) ==
	Team	Cyclists	Time	World Cup points
1	Cervélo Test Team	Charlotte Becker (GER)	55' 34"	35
1	Cervélo Test Team	Regina Bruins (NED)	55' 34"	35
1	Cervélo Test Team	Iris Slappendel (NED)	55' 34"	35
1	Cervélo Test Team	Kirsten Wild (NED)	55' 34"	35
2	Team HTC–Columbia Women	Ellen van Dijk (NED)	+ 1' 08"	30
2	Team HTC–Columbia Women	Judith Arndt (GER)	+ 1' 08"	30
2	Team HTC–Columbia Women	Adrie Visser (NED)	+ 1' 08"	30
2	Team HTC–Columbia Women	Linda Villumsen (NZL)	+ 1' 08"	30
3	Nederland Bloeit	Liesbet De Vocht (BEL)	+ 2' 25"	25
3	Nederland Bloeit	Loes Gunnewijk (NED)	+ 2' 25"	25
3	Nederland Bloeit	Annemiek van Vleuten (NED)	+ 2' 25"	25
3	Nederland Bloeit	Marianne Vos (NED)	+ 2' 25"	25
4	Leontien.nl		+ 2' 28"	20
5	Great Britain		+ 2' 52"	16
6	Australia		+ 3' 23"	15
7	Red Sun Cycling Team		+ 3' 35"	14
8	HiTec Products-UCK		+ 4' 35"	13
9	Ukraine		+ 4' 41"	12
10	Lotto Ladies Team		+ 4' 55"	11

Results from uci.ch.
