= Kirsten Wild =

Dutch racing cyclist (born 1982)

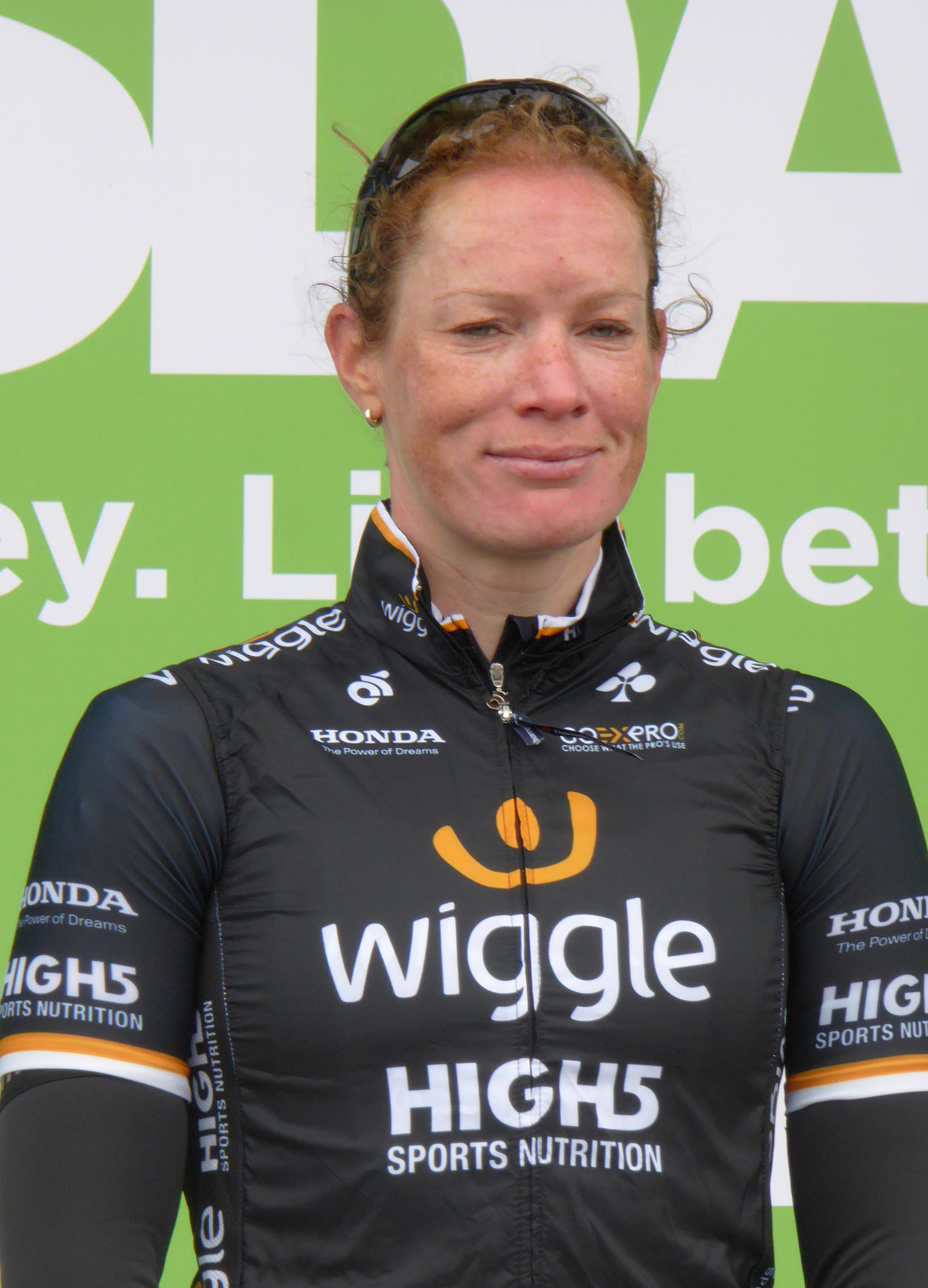
- Wild at the 2018 Women's Tour de Yorkshire

Personal information
- Full name: Kirsten Carlijn Wild
- Born: 15 October 1982 (age 44) Almelo, Netherlands
- Height: 1.76 m (5 ft 9 in)
- Weight: 78 kg (172 lb)

Cycling career
- Sport: Cycling
- Current team: Retired
- Disciplines: Road; Track
- Role: Rider
- Rider type: Sprinter, Classics specialist (Road); Endurance (Track)

Professional teams
- 2004–2005: @Home Cycling Team
- 2006–2008: AA-Drink Cycling Team
- 2009–2010: Cervélo TestTeam
- 2011–2012: AA Drink–leontien.nl
- 2013–2014: Argos–Shimano
- 2015–2016: Team Hitec Products
- 2017: Cylance Pro Cycling
- 2018: Wiggle High5
- 2019–2021: WNT–Rotor Pro Cycling

Major wins
- Road Major Tours Giro d'Italia 4 individual stages (2009, 2013, 2018) Stage races Ladies Tour of Qatar (2009, 2010, 2013, 2014) Tour du Grand Montréal (2009) Tour of Chongming Island (2014, 2015) One-day races and Classics Omloop Het Nieuwsblad (2008) Classic Brugge–De Panne (2019) Gent–Wevelgem (2013, 2019) Dwars door Vlaanderen (2013) Open de Suède Vårgårda (2010) GP Stad Roeselare (2009, 2010) Track World Championships Points race (2018) Scratch race (2015, 2018, 2020) Omnium (2018, 2019) Madison (2019, 2020, 2021)
Medal record
Women's track cycling
Representing Netherlands
Olympic Games
Bronze medal – third place	2020 Tokyo	Omnium
World Championships
Gold medal – first place	2015 Yvelines	Scratch
Gold medal – first place	2018 Apeldoorn	Points race
Gold medal – first place	2018 Apeldoorn	Scratch
Gold medal – first place	2018 Apeldoorn	Omnium
Gold medal – first place	2019 Pruszków	Omnium
Gold medal – first place	2019 Pruszków	Madison
Gold medal – first place	2020 Berlin	Scratch
Gold medal – first place	2020 Berlin	Madison
Gold medal – first place	2021 Roubaix	Madison
Silver medal – second place	2016 London	Scratch
Silver medal – second place	2017 Hong Kong	Omnium
Silver medal – second place	2018 Apeldoorn	Madison
Silver medal – second place	2019 Pruszków	Scratch
Bronze medal – third place	2011 Apeldoorn	Omnium
Bronze medal – third place	2015 Yvelines	Omnium
Bronze medal – third place	2017 Hong Kong	Points race
Bronze medal – third place	2019 Pruszków	Points race
Bronze medal – third place	2021 Roubaix	Points race
European Games
Gold medal – first place	2019 Minsk	Omnium
Gold medal – first place	2019 Minsk	Scratch
Silver medal – second place	2019 Minsk	Madison
European Championships
Gold medal – first place	2013 Apeldoorn	Points race
Gold medal – first place	2016 Yvelines	Elimination race
Gold medal – first place	2016 Yvelines	Points race
Gold medal – first place	2017 Berlin	Elimination race
Gold medal – first place	2018 Glasgow	Omnium
Gold medal – first place	2018 Glasgow	Scratch
Gold medal – first place	2019 Apeldoorn	Elimination race
Gold medal – first place	2019 Apeldoorn	Omnium
Silver medal – second place	2013 Apeldoorn	Omnium
Silver medal – second place	2015 Grenchen	Scratch
Silver medal – second place	2016 Yvelines	Omnium
Silver medal – second place	2017 Berlin	Omnium
Bronze medal – third place	2011 Apeldoorn	Omnium
Bronze medal – third place	2016 Yvelines	Scratch
Bronze medal – third place	2016 Yvelines	Madison
Bronze medal – third place	2017 Berlin	Madison
Bronze medal – third place	2018 Glasgow	Madison
Bronze medal – third place	2019 Apeldoorn	Madison
Women's road cycling
World Championships
Representing Netherlands
Silver medal – second place	2016 Doha	Road race
Representing AA Drink–leontien.nl
Bronze medal – third place	2012 Valkenburg	Team time trial
Event	1st	2nd	3rd
Olympic Games	0	0	1
UCI Track Cycling World Championships	9	4	5
UEC European Track Championships	8	4	6
European Games	2	1	0
UCI Road World Championships	0	1	1
Total	19	10	13

Kirsten Carlijn Wild (born 15 October 1982) is a Dutch former professional racing cyclist, who rode professionally between 2004 and 2021, for eight professional teams. During her track cycling career, Wild rode at the Summer Olympic Games in 2012, 2016 and 2020, winning a bronze medal at the latter Games, in the omnium. She won eighteen medals including nine golds at the UCI Track Cycling World Championships, and eighteen medals including eight golds at the UEC European Track Championships. Wild also took over 100 victories in road racing, and won two medals at the UCI Road World Championships.

== Career ==
At the 2012 London Olympics Wild finished sixth in the omnium, and was a member of the Dutch team that finished sixth in the team pursuit (together with Ellen van Dijk, Amy Pieters and Vera Koedooder).

After two seasons with Team Hitec Products, in September 2016 Cylance Pro Cycling announced that Wild would join them for the 2017 season.

In October 2017, one day after the 2017 UEC European Track Championships in Berlin where Wild won gold at the elimination race, Wiggle High5 announced that Wild would join them for the 2018 season. She then joined WNT–Rotor Pro Cycling in 2019.

On 3 August 2019, after coming first in the RideLondon Classique, she was disqualified after her sudden change of direction before the finish line resulted in a crash involving several riders.

Wild competed at the delayed 2020 Summer Olympics in Tokyo in the madison, where she and Pieters finished fourth after crashing during the race, and the omnium, where she took the bronze medal. After taking over 100 wins on the road, Wild retired from road racing following the Holland Ladies Tour in August 2021. Following this she returned to the track before ending her career at the end of the year, racing in the European Championships, the World Championships (where she and Pieters won gold in the madison for the third consecutive year), and the Champions League.

== Major results ==
=== Road ===
2004
1st Young rider classification Holland Ladies Tour
2nd Overall Novilon Damesronde van Drenthe
2005
3rd Ronde van Gelderland
7th Overall Novilon Damesronde van Drenthe
7th Sparkassen Giro Bochum
2006
1st Overall Ster Zeeuwsche Eilanden

1st Stages 2 & 3

1st Omloop Door Middag-Humsterland
2nd Time trial, National Road Championships
3rd Overall Novilon Damesronde van Drenthe
3rd Lowland International Rotterdam Tour
4th Ronde van Gelderland
4th Omloop van Borsele
9th Open de Suède Vårgårda
10th Rund um die Nürnberger Altstadt
2007
1st Overall Tour de Pologne Feminin

1st Stages 2, 3 & 4

1st Stage 3 Holland Ladies Tour
2nd Overall Ster Zeeuwsche Eilanden
5th Novilon Internationale Damesronde van Drenthe
5th Ronde van Gelderland
5th Rund um die Nürnberger Altstadt
6th Trofeo Alfredo Binda-Comune di Cittiglio
6th Grand Prix de Dottignies
8th Omloop van Borsele
10th Omloop Het Volk
2008
1st Omloop Het Volk
1st Omloop van Borsele
2nd Time trial, National Road Championships
2nd Overall Ster Zeeuwsche Eilanden

1st Prologue

2nd Grand Prix de Dottignies
3rd Tour of Flanders for Women
3rd Novilon Eurocup Ronde van Drenthe
3rd Rund um die Nürnberger Altstadt
8th Ronde van Drenthe
8th Ronde van Gelderland
8th Sparkassen Giro Bochum
10th GP Stad Roeselare
2009
1st Overall Ladies Tour of Qatar
1st Overall Tour du Grand Montréal

1st Stages 1, 2 & 4

1st Omloop van Borsele
1st GP Stad Roeselare
Open de Suède Vårgårda

1st Team time trial
2nd Road race

1st Multidigitaal.nl – Blauwe StadTTT
1st Rund um die Nürnberger Altstadt
Giro d'Italia Femminile

1st Prologue & Stage 9

2nd Time trial, National Road Championships
2nd Overall Holland Ladies Tour

1st Points classification
1st Stages 1, 3 & 4

2nd Tour of Flanders
3rd Drentse 8 van Dwingeloo
4th Grand Prix de Dottignies
5th Trofeo Alfredo Binda-Comune di Cittiglio
5th Ronde van Gelderland
10th Ronde van Drenthe
2010
1st Overall Ladies Tour of Qatar

1st Stage 3

1st Overall Ster Zeeuwsche Eilanden

1st Stages 1 (ITT) & 2

Open de Suède Vårgårda

1st Team time trial
1st Road race

1st Grand Prix de Dottignies
1st Ronde van Gelderland
1st Omloop van Borsele
1st GP Stad Roeselare
1st Stage 4 (ITT) Giro della Toscana Int. Femminile – Memorial Michela Fanini
2nd Overall Tour of Chongming Island Stage race

1st Stage 2

2nd Overall Holland Ladies Tour

1st Stages 4 & 5

2nd Tour of Chongming Island World Cup
3rd Time trial, National Road Championships
3rd Tour of Flanders for Women
3rd Novilon Eurocup Ronde van Drenthe
2011
1st Omloop van Borsele
2nd Overall Ster Zeeuwsche Eilanden
2nd Ronde van Drenthe
2nd Ronde van Gelderland
Open de Suède Vårgårda

2nd Team time trial
6th Road race

3rd Overall Holland Ladies Tour
3rd 7-Dorpenomloop Aalburg
4th Gooik–Geraardsbergen–Gooik
5th Overall Energiewacht Tour
6th GP Stad Roeselare
2012
1st Overall Ster Zeeuwsche Eilanden

1st Stage 3

1st Stage 2 Tour de Feminin-O cenu Českého Švýcarska
1st Stage 3 Holland Ladies Tour
2nd Ronde van Drenthe
3rd Team time trial, UCI Road World Championships
3rd Overall Ladies Tour of Qatar

1st Points classification
1st Stages 1 & 3

4th Overall Belgium Tour

1st Stages 1 & 2

4th Omloop van het Hageland
4th Tour of Flanders for Women
5th Novilon Euregio Cup
7th Overall Energiewacht Tour

1st Stage 4a

7th Ronde van Gelderland
8th EPZ Omloop van Borsele
2013
1st Overall Ladies Tour of Qatar

1st Points classification
1st Stages 2, 3 & 4

1st Ronde van Gelderland
1st Gent–Wevelgem
Belgium Tour

1st Stages 2 & 3

Holland Ladies Tour

1st Points classification
1st Stages 1 & 3

1st Stage 1 Giro d'Italia Femminile
3rd Overall Energiewacht Tour

1st Points classification
1st Stages 1, 2, 3b & 4

3rd Sparkassen Giro Bochum
3rd Profronde van Surhuisterveen
5th Ronde van Drenthe World Cup
10th Tour of Flanders for Women
2014
1st Overall Ladies Tour of Qatar

1st Points classification
1st Stages 1, 3 & 4

1st Overall Tour of Chongming Island

1st Points classification
1st Stages 1 & 2

1st Ronde van Gelderland
1st Novilon EDR Cup
1st Tour of Chongming Island World Cup
La Route de France

1st Stages 4 & 6

2nd EPZ Omloop van Borsele
2nd Ronde van Overijssel
2nd La Course by Le Tour de France
5th Omloop Het Nieuwsblad
5th Open de Suède Vårgårda
6th Ronde van Drenthe World Cup
7th Overall Energiewacht Tour

1st Points classification
1st Stages 1 & 2

9th Gent–Wevelgem
9th Sparkassen Giro
2015
1st Overall Tour of Chongming Island

1st Points classification
1st Stages 1 & 2

1st Novilon EDR Cup
1st Ronde van Gelderland
1st EPZ Omloop van Borsele
1st Grand Prix cycliste de Gatineau
1st Omloop van de IJsseldelta
1st Stage 4 Tour de Bretagne Féminin
2nd Tour of Chongming Island World Cup
3rd La Madrid Challenge by La Vuelta
4th Dwars door de Westhoek
5th Overall Energiewacht Tour

1st Points classification
1st Stage 3

7th Ronde van Overijssel
9th La Course by Le Tour de France
2016
1st Women's Tour de Yorkshire
1st RideLondon Classique
Ladies Tour of Qatar

1st Points classification
1st Stage 1

Energiewacht Tour

1st Stages 4a & 5

1st Stage 4 Tour of California
2nd Road race, UCI Road World Championships
5th Omloop van de IJsseldelta
2017
1st Stage 2 Holland Ladies Tour
2nd Overall Tour of Chongming Island

1st Stage 1

3rd Overall Santos Women's Tour

1st Stages 2 & 4

5th Prudential RideLondon Classique
7th Road race, UEC European Road Championships
7th Cadel Evans Great Ocean Road Race
7th Omloop van het Hageland
10th Crescent Vårgårda Road Race
2018
1st RideLondon Classique
Women's Tour de Yorkshire

1st Points classification
1st Stage 1

1st Stage 2 Giro Rosa
2nd Crescent Vårgårda
5th Overall Healthy Ageing Tour

1st Points classification
1st Stage 3a

7th Overall Tour of Chongming Island

1st Stage 3

2019
1st Three Days of Bruges–De Panne
1st Gent–Wevelgem
2nd Overall Tour de Bretagne Féminin

1st Points classification
1st Stages 1 & 2

3rd Overall Healthy Ageing Tour

1st Points classification
1st Stages 3 & 5

6th Road race, UEC European Road Championships
8th Ronde van Drenthe
2021
6th Classic Brugge–De Panne

==== Classics results timeline ====
Classics results timeline
Classic	2006	2007	2008	2009	2010	2011	2012	2013	2014	2015	2016	2017	2018	2019	2020	2021
Omloop Het Nieuwsblad	13	10	1	—	61	17	—	—	5	—	—	60	—	—	—	—
Ronde van Drenthe	—	12	8	10	14	2	2	5	6	11	—	20	44	8	NH	—
Gent–Wevelgem	Race did not exist						—	1	9	11	—	—	34	1	—	43
Trofeo Alfredo Binda-Comune di Cittiglio	—	6	26	5	28	—	—	—	—	—	—	—	—	—	NH	—
Tour of Flanders	54	51	3	2	3	17	4	10	13	28	—	—	11	45	—	—
Liège–Bastogne–Liège	Race did not exist											—	—	—	—	—
GP de Plouay – Bretagne	—	—	—	—	—	24	—	—	—	—	—	—	—	—	—	—
Open de Suède Vårgårda	9	23	15	2	1	6	13	11	5	26	—	10	2	—	Not held	

Legend
—	Did not compete
DNF	Did not finish
NH	Not held

=== Track ===
2007
3rd Individual pursuit, National Championships
2008
National Championships

2nd Individual pursuit
2nd Points race

2009
3rd Points race, National Championships
2010
2nd Individual pursuit, National Championships
2011
National Championships

1st Madison
2nd Individual pursuit

1st Team pursuit, 2011–12 UCI Track Cycling World Cup, Astana
3rd Omnium, UCI World Championships
3rd Omnium, UEC European Track Championships
2013
UEC European Championships

1st Points race
2nd Omnium

2014
2nd Omnium, Grand Prix of Poland
International Track Women & Men

3rd Omnium
3rd Points race

2015
UCI World Championships

1st Scratch
3rd Omnium

1st Omnium, 2014–15 UCI Track Cycling World Cup, Cali
1st Madison, National Championships
Trofeu CAR Anadia Portugal

1st Omnium
1st Scratch

6 giorni delle rose – Fiorenzuola

1st Scratch
2nd Omnium
2nd Points race

Irish International Track GP

1st Scratch
1st Omnium

2nd Scratch, UEC European Track Championships
2016
UEC European Championships

1st Elimination race
1st Points race
2nd Omnium
3rd Scratch
3rd Madison

National Championships

1st Madison
1st Individual pursuit
1st Scratch
1st Points race

1st Omnium, Apeldoorn Championships
2nd Scratch, UCI World Championships
2017
UEC European Championships

1st Elimination race
2nd Omnium
3rd Madison

National Championships

1st Madison
1st Omnium
1st Scratch

1st Omnium, 2017–18 UCI Track Cycling World Cup, Pruszków
Belgian International Meeting

1st Omnium
2nd Points race
2nd Madison (with Nina Kessler)

1st Madison, Zesdaagse Vlaanderen-Gent (with Amy Pieters)
UCI World Championships

2nd Omnium
3rd Points race

2nd Points race, Revolution Series – Champions League – Round 2, Glasgow
8th Overall Six Day London
2018
UCI World Championships

1st Scratch
1st Omnium
1st Points race
2nd Madison

UEC European Championships

1st Scratch
1st Omnium
3rd Madison

1st Points race, National Championships
Revolution Series Champions League, Round 3 – Manchester

1st Points race
2nd Scratch

Six Days of Bremen

1st Madison
1st Omnium

2019
UCI World Championships

1st Omnium
1st Madison
2nd Scratch
3rd Points race

European Games

1st Omnium
1st Scratch
2nd Madison

UEC European Championships

1st Elimination race
1st Omnium
3rd Madison

2020
UCI World Championships

1st Madison
1st Scratch

2021
UCI World Championships

1st Madison
3rd Points race

2nd Endurance, UCI Track Champions League

1st Scratch, London I

3rd Omnium, Summer Olympics

=== National records ===
Wild was the last three times part of the 3000 m team pursuit squad when they established a new Dutch national record. She is together with Ellen van Dijk and Vera Koedooder the current national record holder, with a time of 3:20.013 (53.996 km/h) established at the 2012 Summer Olympics on 4 August 2012. After the 2011–12 track cycling season the UCI changed the discipline into a 4000 m team pursuit with four riders.

Time	Speed (km/h)	Cyclists	Event	Location of race	Date	Ref
3:23.179	53.155	Ellen van Dijk; Kirsten Wild; Vera Koedooder	2010–11 UCI Track Cycling World Cup Classics – Round 4 (Qualifying)	(United Kingdom) Manchester	18 February 2011	
3:21.550	53.584	Ellen van Dijk; Kirsten Wild; Vera Koedooder	2011–12 UCI Track Cycling World Cup – Round 1	(Kazakhstan) Astana	4 November 2011	
3:20.013	53.996	Ellen van Dijk; Kirsten Wild; Vera Koedooder	2012 Summer Olympics (first round)	(United Kingdom) London	4 August 2012	

== See also ==
- List of Dutch Olympic cyclists
