= Sparkassen Giro Bochum =

Annual road bicycle race in Germany

Race details
- Date: Early August
- Region: Bochum, Germany
- English name: Tour of Bochum
- Local name: Sparkassen Giro Bochum (in German)
- Discipline: Road
- Competition: ♂ UCI Europe Tour ♀ UCI Women's Road World Cup (2014-2015)
- Type: Single-day
- Web site: www.sparkassen-giro.de

History (men)
- First edition: 1998
- Editions: 21
- Final edition: 2019
- First winner: Jan Ullrich (GER)
- Most wins: Marcel Sieberg (GER) (4 wins)
- Final winner: Emanuel Buchmann (GER)

History (women)
- First edition: Sharon van Essen (NED)
- Editions: 19
- Final edition: 2019
- Most wins: No repeat winners
- Final winner: Natalie van Gogh (NED)

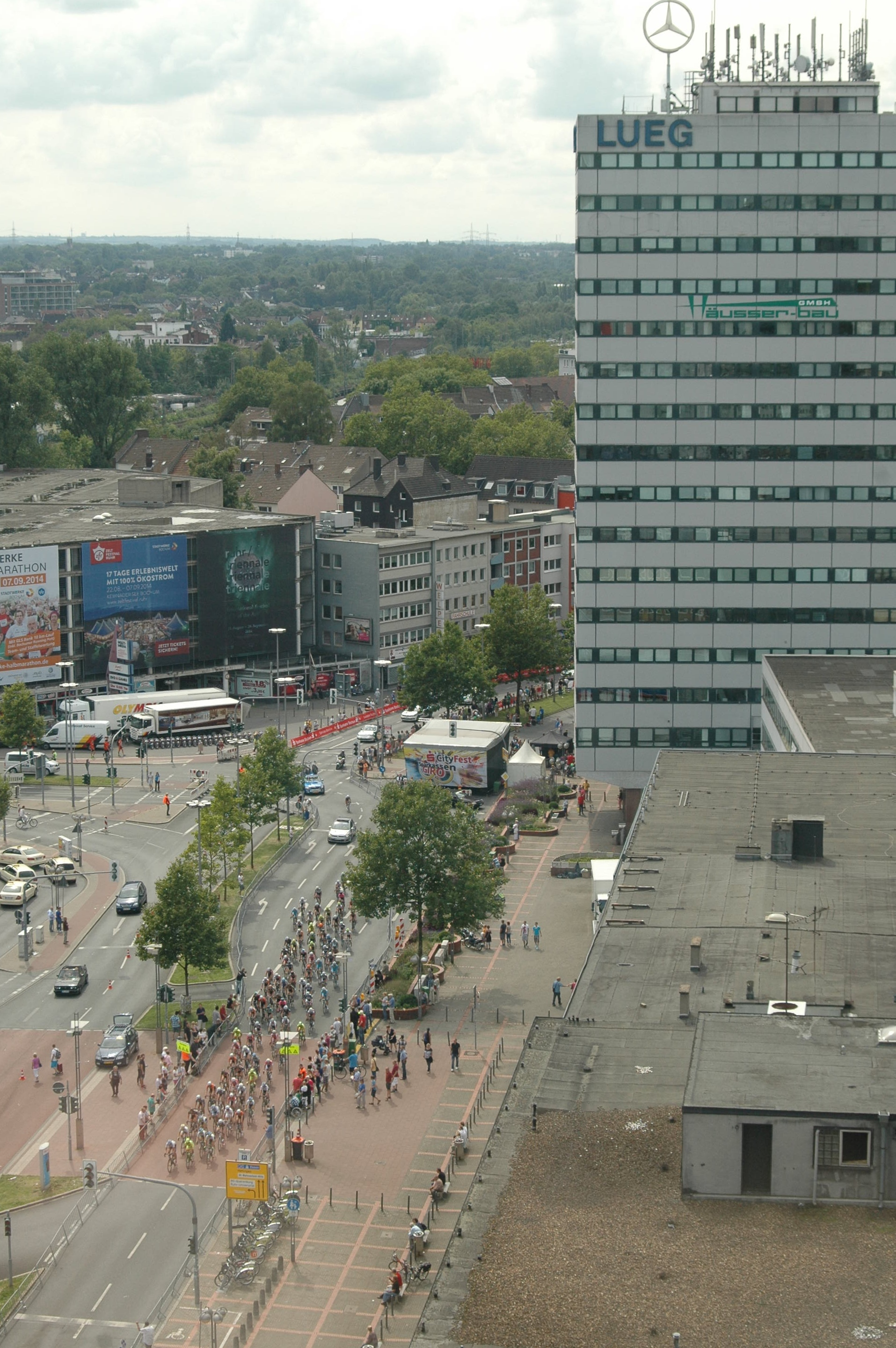
UCI Women's Road World Cup at Bochum Train Station

The Sparkassen Giro Bochum was a road bicycle race held for both men's and women's around an urban circuit in the German city of Bochum, Germany. The race was first held in 1998, and was last held in 2019. The men's race was part of the UCI Europe Tour from 2005, being organised as 1.1 race. The women's race was part of the UCI Women's Road World Cup in 2014 and 2015, but did not join the UCI Women's World Tour for 2016.

In 2022, it was announced that the race would not return, after the 2020 and 2021 editions had been cancelled due to the COVID-19 pandemic.

== Men's winners ==
Year	Country	Rider	Team
1998	Germany	Jan Ullrich	Team Telekom
1999	Germany	Erik Zabel	Team Telekom
2000	Netherlands	Jans Koerts	Farm Frites
2001	Italy	Gianluca Bortolami	Tacconi Sport-Vini Caldirola
2002	Belgium	Frédéric Amorison	Lotto–Adecco
2003	Germany	Rolf Aldag	Team Telekom
2004	Germany	David Kopp	Team Lamonta
2005	Czech Republic	Lubor Tesař	Akud-Arnolds Sicherheit
2006	Germany	Jens Voigt	Team CSC
2007	Belgium	Andy Cappelle	Landbouwkrediet–Tönissteiner
2008	Germany	Eric Baumann	Team Sparkasse
2009	Great Britain	Mark Cavendish	Team Columbia–HTC
2010	Netherlands	Niki Terpstra	Team Milram
2011	Belgium	Pieter Vanspeybrouck	Topsport Vlaanderen–Mercator
2012	Germany	Marcel Sieberg	Lotto–Belisol
2013	No race		
2014	Germany	Marcel Sieberg	Lotto–Belisol
2015	Germany	Marcel Sieberg	Lotto–Soudal
2016	Germany	Marcel Sieberg	Lotto–Soudal
2017	Germany	Marcus Burghardt	Bora–Hansgrohe
2018	Great Britain	Geraint Thomas	Team Sky
2019	Germany	Emanuel Buchmann	Bora–Hansgrohe
2020-2021	No race due to COVID-19 pandemic		

== Women's winners ==
From 2004 through to 2011 the event ran as a UCI 1.1 (old UCI rating of 1.9.2 in 2004), becoming a national event in 2012. In 2013 the event returned as a 1.1 rated event, being upgraded to UCI Women's Road World Cup (CDM) rating for the 2014 and 2015 seasons. Between 2016 and 2019, the event again ran as a national event.

Year	Country	Rider	Team
2001	Netherlands	Sharon van Essen	
2002	Netherlands	Bertine Spijkerman	
2003	Russia	Svetlana Bubnenkova	
2004	United States	Deirdre Demet-Barry	
2005	Germany	Angela Hennig	
2006	Australia	Oenone Wood	Equipe Nürnberger Versicherung
2007	Germany	Hanka Kupfernagel	RC Charlottenburg Berlin
2008	Netherlands	Suzanne de Goede	
2009	Australia	Rochelle Gilmore	
2010	Netherlands	Ellen van Dijk	Team HTC–Columbia Women
2011	Netherlands	Adrie Visser	
2012	Germany	Mieke Kröger	
2013	Luxembourg	Christine Majerus	
2014	Netherlands	Marianne Vos	Rabobank-Liv Woman Cycling Team
2015	Italy	Barbara Guarischi	Velocio–SRAM
2016	Netherlands	Kirsten Peetoom	
2017	Netherlands	Belle de Gast	
2018	Germany	Lydia Wegemund	
2019	Netherlands	Natalie van Gogh	
2020-2021	No race due to COVID-19 pandemic		
