= 2010 Team HTC–Columbia Women season =

2010 Team HTC–Columbia Women
- UCI Team ranking: 2nd
- Manager: Bob Stapleton

Season victories
- One-day races
- Stage race overall
- Best ranked rider: Judith Arndt (2nd)

The 2010 season was the ninth for the Team HTC–Columbia Women cycling team, which began as the T-Mobile team in 2003.

== Roster ==
Ages as of 1 January 2010.

Rider	Date of birth
Kim Anderson (USA)	January 28, 1968 (aged 41)
Judith Arndt (GER)	July 23, 1976 (aged 33)
Noemi Cantele (SWE)	July 17, 1981 (aged 28)
Ellen van Dijk (NED)	February 11, 1987 (aged 22)
Emilia Fahlin (SWE)	October 24, 1988 (aged 21)
Chloe Hosking (AUS)	October 1, 1990 (aged 19)

Rider	Date of birth
Luise Keller (GER)	March 8, 1984 (aged 25)
Evelyn Stevens (USA)	May 9, 1983 (aged 26)
Ina-Yoko Teutenberg (GER)	October 28, 1974 (aged 35)
Linda Villumsen (NZL)	April 9, 1985 (aged 24)
Adrie Visser (NED)	October 19, 1983 (aged 26)

Riders who joined the team for the 2010 season

Rider	2009 team
Noemi Cantele (ITA)	Bigla Cycling Team
Chloe Hosking (AUS)	Moving Ladies
Evelyn Stevens (USA)	Néo-Pro
Adrie Visser (NED)	DSB Bank

Riders who left the team during or after the 2009 season

Rider	2010 team
Mara Abbott (USA)	Peanut Butter & Co TWENTY12
Katherine Bates (AUS)	Colavita/Baci
Chantal Beltman (NED)	Retired
Maria Mendel (GER)	
Alexandra Wrubleski (GER)	

== Results ==
=== Season victories ===
Single day and stage races 2010
Date	Nation	Race	Cat.	Winner
8 April	Netherlands	Drentse 8 van Dwingeloo	1.1	(Germany) Ina-Yoko Teutenberg
5 May	China	Stage 1 Tour of Chongming Island	2.1	(Germany) Ina-Yoko Teutenberg
7 May	China	Stage 3 Tour of Chongming Island	2.1	(Germany) Ina-Yoko Teutenberg
7 May	China	General classification Tour of Chongming Island	2.1	(Germany) Ina-Yoko Teutenberg
9 May	China	Tour of Chongming Island World Cup	CDM	(Germany) Ina-Yoko Teutenberg
17 May	France	Stage 3 Tour de l'Aude	2.1	(Germany) Ina-Yoko Teutenberg
20 May	France	Stage 6 Tour de l'Aude	2.1	(Germany) Ina-Yoko Teutenberg
23 May	France	Stage 9 Tour de l'Aude	2.1	(Germany) Ina-Yoko Teutenberg
5 June	United States	Liberty Classic	1.1	(Germany) Ina-Yoko Teutenberg
11 June	Spain	Stage 2 Emakumeen Euskal Bira	2.1	(Germany) Judith Arndt
12 June	Canada	Chrono Gatineau	1.2	(United States) Evelyn Stevens
20 June	Italy	Stage 2 Giro del Trentino Alto Adige-Südtirol	2.1	(Germany) Ina-Yoko Teutenberg
2 July	Italy	Stage 1 Giro d'Italia Femminile	2.1	(Germany) Ina-Yoko Teutenberg
3 July	Italy	Stage 2 Giro d'Italia Femminile	2.1	(Germany) Ina-Yoko Teutenberg
4 July	Italy	Stage 3 Giro d'Italia Femminile	2.1	(Germany) Ina-Yoko Teutenberg
5 July	Italy	Stage 4 Giro d'Italia Femminile	2.1	(Germany) Ina-Yoko Teutenberg
8 July	Italy	Stage 7 Giro d'Italia Femminile	2.1	(United States) Evelyn Stevens
22 July	Germany	Stage 3 Thüringen Rundfahrt der Frauen	2.1	(Netherlands) Adrie Visser
8 August	Germany	Giro Bochum	1.1	(Netherlands) Ellen van Dijk
9 August	France	Stage 2 Route de France Féminine	2.1	(Germany) Ina-Yoko Teutenberg
12 August	France	Stage 5 Route de France Féminine	2.1	(Germany) Judith Arndt
31 August	Netherlands	Stage 1 Holland Ladies Tour	2.2	(Germany) Ina-Yoko Teutenberg
4 September	Netherlands	Stage 6 Holland Ladies Tour	2.2	(Netherlands) Ellen van Dijk
14 September	Italy	Stage 1 Giro della Toscana Int. Femminile – Memorial Michela Fanini	2.1	HTC–Columbia
16 September	Italy	Stage 3 Giro della Toscana Int. Femminile – Memorial Michela Fanini	2.1	(Italy) Noemi Cantele
19 September	Italy	General classification Giro della Toscana Int. Femminile – Memorial Michela Fanini	2.1	(Germany) Judith Arndt

National, Continental and World champions 2010
Date	Discipline	Jersey	Winner
7 January	Australian National Road Race Championships		Chloe Hosking
23 June	Swedish National Time Trial Championships		Emilia Fahlin
24 June	United States National Time Trial Championships		Evelyn Stevens
25 June	German National Time Trial Championships		Judith Arndt
29 December	Dutch Track Champion (individual pursuit)		Ellen van Dijk

== Results in major races ==
=== Women's World Cup 2010 ===
Judith Arndt finished 5th in the final classification and Adrie Visser 9th. The team finished 2nd in the teams standing.

Results at the World Cup races
Date	#	Race	Best rider	Place
28 March	1	Trofeo Alfredo Binda	(Italy) Noemi Cantele	5
4 April	2	Tour of Flanders	(Netherlands) Adrie Visser	5
10 April	3	Ronde van Drenthe	(Netherlands) Adrie Visser	7
21 April	4	La Flèche Wallonne Féminine	(United States) Evelyn Stevens	5
9 May	5	Tour of Chongming Island World Cup	(Germany) Ina-Yoko Teutenberg	1
6 June	6	GP Ciudad de Valladolid	(Germany) Judith Arndt	2
30 July	7	Open de Suède Vårgårda TTT	HTC–Columbia Women	2
1 August	8	Open de Suède Vårgårda	(Netherlands) Adrie Visser	2
21 August	9	GP de Plouay	(Germany) Judith Arndt	4

=== Grand Tours ===
Results of the team in the grand tours
Grand tour	Giro d'Italia Femminile
Rider (classification)	Judith Arndt (2nd)
Victories	5 stage wins

== UCI World Ranking ==
The team finished third in the UCI ranking for teams, four points behind Nederland Bloeit.

Individual UCI World Ranking
Rank	Rider	Points
2	(Germany) Judith Arndt	944.50
7	(Germany) Ina-Yoko Teutenberg	704.00
20	(Netherlands) Adrie Visser	227.16
21	(United States) Evelyn Stevens	220.66
23	(Netherlands) Ellen van Dijk	209.50
29	(Italy) Noemi Cantele	186.00
34	(Denmark) Linda Villumsen	152.16
52	(Australia) Chloe Hosking	82.00
61	(Sweden) Emilia Fahlin	66.00
284	(Germany) Luise Keller	5.0
